= 2023–24 Gaziantep F.K. season =

Gaziantep F.K.
2023–24 season
- Manager: Erdal Günes (until 4 September); Marius Șumudică (from 6 September)
- Stadium: Gaziantep Stadium
- Süper Lig: 11th
- Turkish Cup: Round of 16
- Top goalscorer: League: Denis Drăguș (14); All: Denis Drăguș (15)
- Average home league attendance: 8,207
- Biggest defeat: Gaziantep 0–3 Galatasaray
- All statistics correct as of 26 May 2024.

The 2023–24 season was Gaziantep F.K.'s 36th season in existence and fifth consecutive in the Süper Lig. They also competed in the Turkish Cup.

== Players ==
=== First-team squad ===
As of 5 September 2023

Note: Flags indicate national team as defined under FIFA eligibility rules; some limited exceptions apply. Players may hold more than one non-FIFA nationality.

No.	Pos.	Nation	Player
1	GK	TUR	Mustafa Burak Bozan
2	DF	GER	Berkan Küpelikılınç
3	DF	SEN	Papy Djilobodji
4	DF	TUR	Arda Kızıldağ
5	MF	TUR	Furkan Soyalp
7	FW	KOS	Valmir Veliu
8	MF	SRB	Marko Jevtović
10	MF	CIV	Max Gradel
11	FW	TUR	Mustafa Eskihellaç
12	MF	GBS	Janio Bikel
15	DF	TUR	Ertuğrul Ersoy
17	GK	TUR	Ekrem Kılıçarslan
19	GK	TUR	Batuhan Şen (on loan from Galatasaray)
22	DF	FRA	Salem M'Bakata
23	FW	GER	Abdulkerim Çakar

No.	Pos.	Nation	Player
24	MF	ALG	Naoufel Khacef
26	FW	TUR	Mirza Cihan
27	DF	TUR	Ömürcan Artan
30	MF	AUT	Onurhan Babuscu
35	DF	TUR	Ulaş Zengin
44	MF	ROU	Alexandru Maxim
50	MF	SRB	Lazar Marković
54	GK	TUR	Erten Ersu
80	MF	MKD	Luka Stankovski
90	MF	TUR	Berke Gürbüz
91	MF	TUR	Bahadır Gölgeli
94	FW	COL	Brayan Riascos (on loan from Metalist Kharkiv)
—	FW	TUR	İlker Karakaş
—	MF	SUI	Albian Ajeti

== Transfers ==
=== In ===
Pos.	Player	Transferred from	Fee	Date	Source
DF	(Algeria) Naoufel Khacef	(Portugal) Tondela	Free	20 July 2023	
MF	(Ivory Coast) Max Gradel	(Turkey) Sivasspor	Free	25 July 2023	
GK	(Turkey) Batuhan Şen	(Turkey) Galatasaray	Loan	1 August 2023	
DF	(Democratic Republic of the Congo) Salem M'Bakata	(Greece) Aris Thessaloniki	€250,000	8 August 2023	
MF	(Guinea-Bissau) Janio Bikel	(Russia) Khimki	Free	15 August 2023	
FW	(Switzerland) Albian Ajeti	(Scotland) Celtic	€585,000	4 September 2023	
DF	(Brazil) Júnior Morais	(Romania) Rapid București	Free	9 September 2023	
GK	(Romania) Florin Niță	(Czech Republic) Sparta Prague	Free	9 September 2023	
FW	(Romania) Denis Drăguș	(Belgium) Standard Liège	Loan	13 September 2023	
FW	(Turkey) Oğulcan Çağlayan	(Turkey) Galatasaray		14 September 2023	

=== Out ===
Pos.	Player	Transferred to	Fee	Date	Source
GK	(Turkey) Günay Güvenç	(Turkey) Galatasaray	€250,000	1 August 2023	
MF	(Chile) Ángelo Sagal	(Cyprus) Apollon Limassol	Free	4 August 2023	
MF	(Turkey) Hasan Yurtseven	(Turkey) Kırklarelispor	Free	16 August 2023	
FW	(Turkey) Yusuf Türk	(Turkey) Kastamonuspor	Undisclosed	19 August 2023	

== Pre-season and friendlies ==
Win Draw Loss Fixtures

August 2023 Friendly	(Turkey)	v	(Turkey)
--:-- UTC+3

== Competitions ==
=== Overall record ===
Competition	First match	Last match	Starting round	Final position	Record							
Competition	First match	Last match	Starting round	Final position	Pld	W	D	L	GF	GA	GD	Win %
Süper Lig	13 August 2023	19 May 2024	Matchday 1		27	7	7	13	31	40	−9	25.93
Turkish Cup	2 November 2023	7 February 2024	Third round	Round of 16	4	3	0	1	7	3	+4	75.00
Total					31	10	7	14	38	43	−5	32.26

Last updated: 24 February 2024
Source: Soccerway

=== Süper Lig ===
==== League table ====
Pos	Team	Pld	W	D	L	GF	GA	GD	Pts
9	Rizespor	38	14	8	16	48	58	−10	50
10	Antalyaspor	38	12	13	13	44	49	−5	49
11	Gaziantep	38	12	8	18	50	57	−7	44 (Note: Gaziantep are ahead of Adana Demirspor on head-to-head points: Gaziantep 2–2 Adana Demirspor, Adana Demirspor 1–6 Gaziantep.)
12	Adana Demirspor	38	10	14	14	54	61	−7	44
13	Samsunspor	38	11	10	17	42	52	−10	43

Source: Süper Lig
Rules for classification: 1) Points; 2) Head-to-head points; 3) Head-to-head goal difference; 4) Head-to-head goals scored; 5) Goal difference; 6) Goals scored; 7) Play-off.

==== Results summary ====
Overall								Home						Away					
Pld	W	D	L	GF	GA	GD	Pts	W	D	L	GF	GA	GD	W	D	L	GF	GA	GD
27	7	7	13	31	40	−9	28	3	5	6	14	20	−6	4	2	7	17	20	−3

Last updated: 24 February 2024.
Source: Trendyol Süper Lig

==== Results by round ====
Round	1	2	3	4	5	6	7	8	9	10	11	12	13	14	15	16	17	18	19	20	21	22	23	24	25	26	27
Ground	A	H	A	H	A	H	A	A	H	A	H	A	H	A	H	A	H	A	H	H	A	H	A	H	A	H	H
Result	L	L	L	L	L	W	W	L	W	L	W	W	L	L	L	D	D	W	D	L	D	D	L	D	W	D	L
Position	16	19	20	20	20	18	16	17	16	16	13	11	13	14	15	15	16	16	14	16	14	15	17	18	17	17	

Updated to match(es) played on 24 February 2024. Source: Trendyol Süper Lig
A = Away; H = Home; W = Win; D = Draw; L = Loss

==== Matches ====
The league fixtures were unveiled on 19 July 2023.

13 August 2023 1	Fenerbahçe	2–1	Gaziantep	Istanbul
21:45 TRT (UTC+3)	Džeko 3', 18'; Tadić (penalty missed) 54'	Report	Maxim (yellow card) 19' (yellow-red card); Marković (yellow card) 20'; Gradel (yellow card) 42'; Kızıldağ 45+5'; Soyalp (yellow card) 59'; Eskihellaç (yellow card) 77'	Stadium: Şükrü Saracoğlu Stadium; Attendance: 38,753; Referee: Abdulkadir Bitigen

20 August 2023 2	Gaziantep	1–3	Sivasspor	Gaziantep
21:45 TRT (UTC+3)		Report		Stadium: Gaziantep Stadium; Referee: Arda Kardeşler

25 August 2023 3	Konyaspor	2–0	Gaziantep	Konya
21:00 TRT (UTC+3)	Calvo (yellow card) 45'; Guilherme 68'; Murić 90+5'	Report	Ersoy (yellow card) 4'; Riascos (yellow card) 31'	Stadium: Konya Metropolitan Municipality Stadium; Referee: Mete Kalkavan

2 September 2023 4	Gaziantep	0–3	Galatasaray	Gaziantep
21:45 TRT (UTC+3)		Report		Stadium: Gaziantep Stadium; Referee: Ali Şansalan

16 September 2023 5	Kayserispor	2–0	Gaziantep	Kayseri
17:00 TRT (UTC+3)	Thiam 6' (pen.), 89'	Report		Stadium: Kadir Has Stadium; Referee: Ümit Öztürk

5 January 2024 19	Gaziantep	2–2	Pendikspor	Gaziantep
17:00 TRT (UTC+3)				Stadium: Gaziantep Stadium

14 January 2024 20	Gaziantep	0–1	Fenerbahçe	Gaziantep
19:00 TRT (UTC+3)				Stadium: Gaziantep Stadium

24 January 2024 22	Gaziantep	1–1	Konyaspor	Gaziantep
17:00 TRT (UTC+3)				Stadium: Gaziantep Stadium

3 February 2024 24	Gaziantep	1–1	Kayserispor	Gaziantep
19:00 TRT (UTC+3)	Sazdağı 68' (o.g.); Maxim (yellow card) 68'; M'Bakata (yellow card) 83'		Özbek 11'; Cardoso (yellow card) 25'; Kocaman (yellow card) 67'; Bayazit (yellow card) 68'; Yılmaz (yellow card) 85'	Stadium: Gaziantep Stadium; Referee: Murat Erdoğan

11 February 2024 25	İstanbulspor	1–3	Gaziantep	Istanbul
16:00 TRT (UTC+3)	Loshaj 6', (yellow card) 30' (yellow-red card) 70'; Yeşil (yellow card) 45+1'; Erdoğan (yellow card) 59'		Drăguș 15', 60' (pen.), (yellow card) 75'; M'Bakata (yellow card) 82'; Sorescu 90+5'	Stadium: Esenyurt Necmi Kadıoğlu Stadium; Referee: Abdulkadir Bitigen

18 February 2024 26	Gaziantep	1–1	Samsunspor	Gaziantep
16:00 TRT (UTC+3)	Özçiçek 83'; Djilobodji (red card) 90+8'		Šatka 90+2'	Stadium: Gaziantep Stadium; Referee: Zorbay Küçük

24 February 2024 27	Gaziantep	0–2	İstanbul Başakşehir	Gaziantep
16:00 TRT (UTC+3)	Monteiro (yellow card) 45'		Figueiredo (yellow card) 40'; Piątek 60'; Abeid (yellow card) 57', (goal) 90+8'; Türüç (yellow card) 84'	Stadium: Gaziantep Stadium; Referee: Ali Şansalan
