= 2022–23 Gaziantep F.K. season =

Gaziantep F.K.
2022–23 season
- President: Cevdet Akınal
- Head coach: Erol Bulut
- Stadium: Gaziantep Stadium
- Süper Lig: 18th (withdrew)
- Turkish Cup: Quarter-finals (withdrew)
- Top goalscorer: League: João Figueiredo (7); All: João Figueiredo (9)
- Highest home attendance: 13,426 (vs. Fenerbahçe, 15 January 2023, Süper Lig)
- Lowest home attendance: 575 (vs. Ümraniyespor, 11 September 2022, Süper Lig)
Home colours	Away colours	Third colours

The 2022–23 season was the 35th season in the existence of Gaziantep F.K. and the club's fourth consecutive season in the top flight of Turkish football. In addition to the domestic league, Gaziantep F.K. participated in this season's edition of the Turkish Cup. The season covers the period from 1 July 2022 to 30 June 2023.

On 12 February 2023, Gaziantep F.K. announced withdrawal from the league and the cup due to the 2023 Turkey–Syria earthquake, which widely hit its home city.

== Players ==
=== First-team squad ===
As of 30 August 2022

Note: Flags indicate national team as defined under FIFA eligibility rules; some limited exceptions apply. Players may hold more than one non-FIFA nationality.

No.	Pos.	Nation	Player
1	GK	TUR	Günay Güvenç
3	DF	SEN	Papy Djilobodji
4	MF	TUR	Arda Kızıldağ
5	MF	TUR	Furkan Soyalp
6	DF	ROU	Alin Toșca
7	FW	KOS	Valmir Veliu
8	MF	SRB	Marko Jevtović
9	FW	CZE	Tomáš Pekhart
11	DF	TUR	Halil İbrahim Pehlivan
15	DF	TUR	Ertuğrul Ersoy
16	DF	CZE	Matěj Hanousek (on loan from Sparta Prague)
17	FW	TUR	Mustafa Eskihellaç
19	MF	TUR	Abdulkadir Parmak
20	MF	TUR	Recep Niyaz
22	FW	NOR	Torgeir Børven

No.	Pos.	Nation	Player
25	FW	BRA	João Figueiredo
26	FW	TUR	Mirza Cihan
27	DF	TUR	Ömürcan Artan
28	FW	CHI	Ángelo Sagal
44	MF	ROU	Alexandru Maxim
50	FW	SRB	Lazar Marković
52	MF	KAZ	Alexander Merkel
70	DF	GRE	Stelios Kitsiou
71	GK	TUR	Mustafa Burak Bozan
72	GK	TUR	Berkay Erkul
77	MF	TUR	Cenk Şahin
80	MF	MKD	Luka Stankovski
90	MF	TUR	Berke Gürbüz
91	MF	TUR	Bahadir Gölgeli
—	GK	TUR	Erten Ersu

=== Out on loan ===
Note: Flags indicate national team as defined under FIFA eligibility rules; some limited exceptions apply. Players may hold more than one non-FIFA nationality.

No. / Pos. / Nation / Player; — / MF / TUR / Yusuf Türk (at Somaspor)	No. / Pos. / Nation / Player; — / GK / TUR / Ekrem Kılıçarslan (at Göztepe)

== Pre-season and friendlies ==
Win Draw Loss Fixtures

30 June 2022 Friendly	Gaziantep (Turkey)	1–0	(Romania) Hermannstadt	Bolu
16:30 TRT (UTC+3)	Figueiredo 88'			Stadium: Koru Hotel Futbol Sahası

2 July 2022 Friendly	Gaziantep (Turkey)	1–2	(Russia) Orenburg	Kaynaşlı
16:00 TRT (UTC+3)				Stadium: Fenerbahce SK Topuk Yaylasi Tesisleri

5 July 2022 Friendly	Gaziantep (Turkey)	2–1	(Azerbaijan) Gabala	Karacasu
16:30 TRT (UTC+3)				Stadium: Bolu Termal Otel Tesisleri

8 July 2022 Friendly	Adana Demirspor (Turkey)	0–2	(Turkey) Gaziantep	Karacasu
15:30 TRT (UTC+3)				Stadium: Bolu Termal Otel Tesisleri

14 July 2022 Friendly	Gaziantep (Turkey)	0–0	(Azerbaijan) Neftçi	Turkey
16:00 TRT (UTC+3)

16 July 2022 Friendly	Gaziantep (Turkey)	2–1	(Turkey) Keçiörengücü	Turkey
16:00 TRT (UTC+3)

17 July 2022 Friendly	Gaziantep (Turkey)	1–0	(Turkey) Samsunspor	Turkey
16:00 TRT (UTC+3)

20 July 2022 Friendly	Gaziantep (Turkey)	1–4	(Turkey) Fatih Karagümrük	Turkey
16:00 TRT (UTC+3)

22 July 2022 Friendly	Gaziantep (Turkey)	2–0	(Turkey) Pendikspor	Turkey
16:00 TRT (UTC+3)

23 July 2022 Friendly	Gaziantep (Turkey)	0–1	(Turkey) Eyüpspor	Turkey
15:30 TRT (UTC+3)

24 September 2022 Friendly	Gaziantep (Turkey)	1–1	(Turkey) Yeni Malatyaspor	Gaziantep
15:30 TRT (UTC+3)	Veliu 13'		Akgün 77'	Stadium: Gaziantep Futbol Kulübü Tesisleri

5 December 2022 Friendly	Gaziantep (Turkey)	3–1	(Saudi Arabia) Al Batin	Turkey
16:30 TRT (UTC+3)

== Competitions ==
=== Overall record ===
Competition	First match	Last match	Starting round	Final position	Record							
Competition	First match	Last match	Starting round	Final position	Pld	W	D	L	GF	GA	GD	Win %
Süper Lig	6 August 2022	4 February 2023	Matchday 1	18th (withdrew)	36	6	7	23	31	72	−41	16.67
Turkish Cup	20 October 2022	19 January 2023	Third round	Quarter final (withdrew)	3	2	1	0	6	1	+5	66.67
Total					39	8	8	23	37	73	−36	20.51

Source: Soccerway

=== Süper Lig ===
==== League table ====
Pos	Team	Pld	W	D	L	GF	GA	GD	Pts	Qualification or relegation
15	Alanyaspor	36	11	8	17	54	70	−16	41 (Note: Head-to-head points: İstanbulspor 11, Antalyaspor 10, Sivasspor 8, Alanyaspor 4.)	
16	Giresunspor (R)	36	10	10	16	42	60	−18	40	Relegation to TFF First League
17	Ümraniyespor (R)	36	7	9	20	47	64	−17	30	Relegation to TFF First League
18	Gaziantep (Note: On 12 February 2023, Gaziantep and Hatayspor withdrew from the league following the 2023 Turkey–Syria earthquake and were not relegated at the end of the season.)	36	6	7	23	31	72	−41	25	Withdrawn
19	Hatayspor	36	6	5	25	19	83	−64	23	Withdrawn

Source: Süper Lig
Rules for classification: 1) Points; 2) Head-to-head points; 3) Head-to-head goal difference; 4) Head-to-head goals scored; 5) Goal difference; 6) Goals scored; 7) Play-off.
(R) Relegated

==== Results summary ====
Overall								Home						Away					
Pld	W	D	L	GF	GA	GD	Pts	W	D	L	GF	GA	GD	W	D	L	GF	GA	GD
36	6	7	23	31	72	−41	25	3	4	11	17	37	−20	3	3	12	14	35	−21

Source: Spor Toto Süper Lig

==== Results by round ====
Round	1	2	3	4	5	6	7	8	9	10	11	12	13	14	15	16	17	18	19	20	21	22	23	24	25	26	27	28	29	30	31	32	33	34	35	36	37	38
Ground	A	H	A	H	A	H	A	A	H	A	B	A	H	A	H	A	H	A	H	H	A	H	A	H	A	H	H	A	H	B	H	A	H	A	H	A	H	A
Result	D	W	W	W	L	D	L	L	D	W	B	L	L	D	D	L	D	D	L	L	W	W	L	L	L	L	L	L	L	B	L	L	L	L	L	L	L	L
Position	9	7	4	2	5	6	9	10	10	9	9	10	11	11	10	11	12	11	12	13	11	9	10	11	12	14	14	15	17	17	17	17	18	18	18	18	18	18

Source: Spor Toto Süper Lig
A = Away; H = Home; B = Bye; W = Win; D = Draw; L = Loss

==== Matches ====
6 August 2022 1	Sivasspor	1–1	Gaziantep	Sivas
19:15 TRT (UTC+3)	Osmanpaşa (yellow card) 31'; Gradel 64' (pen.); Yatabaré (yellow card) 84'	Report	Maxim 22'; Djilobodji (yellow card) 39'; Hanousek (yellow card) 61'; Soyalp (yellow card) 67'	Stadium: New Sivas 4 Eylül Stadium; Attendance: 3,984; Referee: Ali Şansalan

14 August 2022 2	Gaziantep	1–0	Ankaragücü	Gaziantep
19:15 TRT (UTC+3)	Kitsiou (yellow card) 30'; Ersoy (yellow card) 45' (goal) 47'	Report	Çankaya (yellow card) 28'; Chatzigiovanis (yellow card) 35'; Diack (yellow card) 79'	Stadium: Gaziantep Stadium; Attendance: 1,484; Referee: Mustafa Kürşad Filiz

20 August 2022 3	Hatayspor	1–2	Gaziantep	Antakya
19:15 TRT (UTC+3)	El Kaabi 31'; Vranješ (yellow card) 58'; Çörekçi (yellow card) 59'	Report	Figueiredo 7'; Maxim (yellow card) 34'; Jevtović 49' (yellow card) 82'; Marković (yellow card) 51'	Stadium: New Hatay Stadium; Attendance: 3,970; Referee: Atilla Karaoğlan

26 August 2022 4	Gaziantep	5–2	Antalyaspor	Antakya
21:00 TRT (UTC+3)	Figueiredo 28', 54', 73' (yellow card) 71'; Pekhart 58'; Maxim (yellow card) 66'; Djilobodji (yellow card) 67'; Sagal 67'	Report	Wright 30', 40'; Fernando (yellow card) 58'; Aydoğdu (yellow card) 90+3'	Stadium: New Hatay Stadium; Attendance: 688; Referee: Suat Arslanboğa

5 September 2022 5	Galatasaray	2–1	Gaziantep	Istanbul
21:00 TRT (UTC+3)	Bardakcı (yellow card) 31' (yellow-red card) 45'; Gomis 36' (penalty missed) 73'; Oliveira (yellow card) 40'; Torreira (yellow card) 45'; Kitsiou 90+1' (o.g.)	Report	Sagal 27'; Güvenç (yellow card) 40'; Maxim (yellow card) 45+5'; Eskihellaç (yellow card) 54'; Soyalp (yellow card) 89'; Kitsiou (yellow card) 90'	Stadium: Nef Stadium; Attendance: 43,783; Referee: Yaşar Kemal Uğurlu

11 September 2022 6	Gaziantep	1–1	Ümraniyespor	Hatay
20:00 TRT (UTC+3)	Kitsiou (yellow card) 25'; Maxim 59' (pen.); Djilobodji (yellow card) 75'; Marković (yellow card) 86'	Report	Sackey (yellow card) 50'; Avounou (yellow card) 72'; Mršić 90' (pen.); Del Valle (yellow card) 90+3'	Stadium: New Hatay Stadium; Attendance: 575; Referee: Ümit Öztürk

18 September 2022 7	Trabzonspor	3–2	Gaziantep	Trabzon
17:00 TRT (UTC+3)	Trézéguet 14'; Bakasetas 42' (pen.); Bartra (yellow card) 87' (goal) 90+8'; Çakır (yellow card) 90+9'	Report	Maxim 2'; Marković 9'; Pehlivan (yellow card) 77'; Güvenç (yellow card) 90+10'; Ersoy (yellow card) 90+11'	Stadium: Şenol Güneş Sports Complex; Attendance: 22,062; Referee: Mete Kalkavan

1 October 2022 8	Kasımpaşa	1–0	Gaziantep	Istanbul
14:30 TRT (UTC+3)	Çiftpınar (yellow card) 43'; Eysseric (yellow card) 45+1'; Celina 57'	Report	Sagal (yellow card) 45+5'; Marković (yellow card) 55'	Stadium: Recep Tayyip Erdoğan Stadium; Attendance: 1,529; Referee: Zorbay Küçük

7 October 2022 9	Gaziantep	1–1	Adana Demirspor	Gaziantep
20:00 TRT (UTC+3)	Marković 69'; Ersoy (red card) 78'; Sagal (yellow card) 80'; Djilobodji (yellow card) 90+5'	Report	Güler (yellow card) 8'; Assombalonga 60'	Stadium: Gaziantep Stadium; Attendance: 6,697; Referee: Sarper Barış Saka

15 October 2022 10	Konyaspor	0–1	Gaziantep	Konya
20:00 TRT (UTC+3)	Demirbağ (yellow card) 16'; Guilherme (penalty missed) 38'; Çekiçi (yellow card) 67'	Report	Kitsiou (yellow card) 36'; Jevtović (yellow card) 43'; Soyalp (yellow card) 66'; Kızıldağ (yellow card) 68' (goal) 85'; Figueiredo (yellow card) 90+3'	Stadium: Konya Metropolitan Municipality Stadium; Attendance: 12,524; Referee: Çağdaş Altay

11	Bye

29 October 2022 12	Alanyaspor	2–0	Gaziantep	Antalya
20:00 TRT (UTC+3)	Fer 21' (yellow card) 44'; Doumbia (yellow card) 22'; Balkovec 53'	Report	Toșca (yellow card) 73'	Stadium: Kırbıyık Holding Stadium; Attendance: 2,749; Referee: Arda Kardeşler

6 November 2022 13	Gaziantep	1–2	Kayserispor	Gaziantep
14:30 TRT (UTC+3)	Figueiredo (yellow card) 31'; Soyalp 52' (yellow card) 59'; Kitsiou (yellow card) 90+2'	Report	Kemen 41'; Sazdağı (yellow card) 51'; Cardoso (yellow card) 53'; Hosseini (yellow card) 83'; Civelek 88'; Carole (yellow card) 90+2'; Parlak (yellow card) 90+3'	Stadium: Gaziantep Stadium; Attendance: 4,791; Referee: Erkan Özdamar

13 November 2022 14	Fatih Karagümrük	3–3	Gaziantep	Istanbul
14:30 TRT (UTC+3)	Baniya 32', 52'; Dursun (yellow card) 63'; Kouassi 69'	Report	Ersoy 13' (yellow card) 46'; Figueiredo 20'; Jevtović (yellow card) 25'; Merkel (yellow card) 62' (goal) 65'	Stadium: Atatürk Olympic Stadium; Attendance: 144; Referee: Mustafa Kürşad Filiz

25 December 2022 15	Gaziantep	1–1	Beşiktaş	Gaziantep
16:00 TRT (UTC+3)	Güvenç (yellow card) MÖ'; Jevtović (yellow card) 28'; Figueiredo 71'; Ersoy (yellow card) 81'; Merkel (yellow card) 90+1'	Report	N'Koudou (yellow card) 25'; Weghorst 86'; Uçan (yellow card) 90+8'	Stadium: Gaziantep Stadium; Attendance: 7,944; Referee: Atilla Karaoğlan

29 December 2022 16	Giresunspor	2–1	Gaziantep	Giresun
17:00 TRT (UTC+3)	Arias (yellow card) 23'; Serginho 24'; Sağlam (yellow card) 49'; Sainz (yellow card) 56'; Savićević (yellow card) 80'; Kuwas (yellow card) 90+5'; Bajić 90+5'	Report	Kitsiou (yellow card) 6'; Soyalp (yellow card) 33'; Veliu 52'; Djilobodji (yellow card) 79'	Stadium: Çotanak Sports Complex; Attendance: 2,828; Referee: Zorbay Küçük

5 January 2023 17	Gaziantep	1–1	İstanbul Başakşehir	Gaziantep
17:00 TRT (UTC+3)	Maxim (yellow card) 45+4' (goal) 90+7'; Marković (yellow card) 73'	Report	Özcan 44'	Stadium: Gaziantep Stadium; Attendance: 2,471; Referee: Abdulkadir Bitigen

9 January 2023 18	İstanbulspor	1–1	Gaziantep	Istanbul
20:00 TRT (UTC+3)	Yılmaz (yellow card) 87'; Ethemi 90+10'	Report	Jevtović 38'; Eskihellaç (yellow card) 90+10'	Stadium: Necmi Kadıoğlu Stadium; Attendance: 396; Referee: Burak Şeker

15 January 2023 19	Gaziantep	1–2	Fenerbahçe	Gaziantep
19:00 TRT (UTC+3)	Maxim (yellow card) 19'; Djilobodji (yellow card) 47'; Kitsiou 55'; Sagal (yellow card) 59' (yellow-red card) 70'; Jevtović (yellow card) 90+4'	Report	Mor (yellow card) 7'; Valencia 8', 90+1'; Szalai (yellow card) 73'; Dursun (yellow card) 90'	Stadium: Gaziantep Stadium; Attendance: 13,426; Referee: Mustafa Kürşad Filiz

22 January 2023 20	Gaziantep	1–2	Sivasspor	Gaziantep
13:30 TRT (UTC+3)	Kitsiou (yellow card) 4'; Djilobodji (yellow card) 53'; Eskihellaç 60'; Artan (yellow card) 67'	Report	Yatabaré 17'; Osmanpaşa 48'	Stadium: Gaziantep Stadium; Attendance: 4,710; Referee: Cihan Aydın

28 January 2023 21	Ankaragücü	0–2	Gaziantep	Ankara
16:00 TRT (UTC+3)	Üzüm (yellow card) 89'	Report	Pehlivan (yellow card) 33'; Kitsiou (yellow card) 36'; Djilobodji 47'; Ersoy (yellow card) 89'; Veliu (yellow card) 90+2'; Figueiredo 90+7'	Stadium: Eryaman Stadium; Attendance: 11,854; Referee: Mert Güzenge

1 February 2023 22	Gaziantep	4–1	Hatayspor	Gaziantep
17:00 TRT (UTC+3)	Djilobodji (yellow card) 35'; Jevtović 38'; Marković 56', 77'; Soyalp (yellow card) 71'; Artan (yellow card) 87'; Merkel 88'; Stankovski (yellow card) 90+6'	Report	El Kaabi 27'; Kanak (yellow card) 79'; Kardeşler (yellow card) 90+7'	Stadium: Gaziantep Stadium

4 February 2023 23	Antalyaspor	1–0	Gaziantep	Antalya
19:00 TRT (UTC+3)	Fredy 29' (yellow card) 56'; Larsson (yellow card) 34'; Fernando (yellow card) 45+4'	Report	Soyalp (yellow card) 2'; Güvenç (yellow card) 78'; Marković (yellow card) 85' (yellow card) 90' (red card); Ersoy (yellow card) 90+2'	Stadium: Antalya Stadium; Referee: Burak Pakkan

24	Gaziantep	0–3 (w/o)	Galatasaray	Gaziantep
		Report		Stadium: Gaziantep Stadium

25	Ümraniyespor	3–0 (w/o)	Gaziantep	Istanbul
		Report		Stadium: Ümraniye Municipality City Stadium

26	Gaziantep	0–3 (w/o)	Trabzonspor	Gaziantep
		Report		Stadium: Gaziantep Stadium

27	Gaziantep	0–3 (w/o)	Kasımpaşa	Gaziantep
		Report		Stadium: Gaziantep Stadium

28	Adana Demirspor	3–0 (w/o)	Gaziantep	Adana
		Report		Stadium: New Adana Stadium

29	Gaziantep	0–3 (w/o)	Konyaspor	Gaziantep
		Report		Stadium: Gaziantep Stadium

30	Bye

31	Gaziantep	0–3 (w/o)	Alanyaspor	Gaziantep
		Report		Stadium: Gaziantep Stadium

32	Kayserispor	3–0 (w/o)	Gaziantep	Kayseri
		Report		Stadium: Kadir Has Stadium

33	Gaziantep	0–3 (w/o)	Fatih Karagümrük	Gaziantep
		Report		Stadium: Gaziantep Stadium

34	Beşiktaş	3–0 (w/o)	Gaziantep	Istanbul
		Report		Stadium: Vodafone Park

35	Gaziantep	0–3 (w/o)	Giresunspor	Gaziantep
		Report		Stadium: Gaziantep Stadium

36	İstanbul Başakşehir	3–0 (w/o)	Gaziantep	Istanbul
		Report		Stadium: Fatih Terim Stadium

37	Gaziantep	0–3 (w/o)	İstanbulspor	Gaziantep
		Report		Stadium: Gaziantep Stadium

38	Fenerbahçe	3–0 (w/o)	Gaziantep	Istanbul
		Report		Stadium: Şükrü Saracoğlu Stadium

=== Turkish Cup ===
20 October 2022 Third round	Gaziantep	4–0	Sarıyer	Gaziantep
20:30 TRT (UTC+3)	Veliu (yellow card) 30'; Parmak 32'; Babuşçu (yellow card) 44'; Figueiredo 78', 85'; Merkel 83'	Report		Stadium: Gaziantep Stadium; Referee: Cihan Aydın

9 November 2022 Fourth round	Gaziantep	2–0	Belediye Kütahyaspor	Gaziantep
19:00 TRT (UTC+3)	Pekhart 38'; Çakır 74' (o.g.)	Report		Stadium: Gaziantep Stadium; Referee: Abdullah Buğra Taşkınsoy

22 December 2022 Fifth round	Gaziantep	3–1	Boluspor	Gaziantep
17:00 TRT (UTC+3)	Maxim 42' (pen.); Ersoy 66'; Bozan (yellow card) 90+1'; Marković 90+3'	Report	İşçiler (yellow card) 40'; Çınar (yellow card) 59'; Bregu 87'	Stadium: Gaziantep Stadium; Referee: Ümit Öztürk

19 January 2023 Round of 16	Gaziantep	1–1 (a.e.t.) (7–6 p)	Konyaspor	Gaziantep
17:30 TRT (UTC+3)	Maxim (yellow card) 25'; Toșca (yellow card) 45'; Eskihellaç 108'; Güvenç (yellow card) 116'	Report	Guilherme (penalty missed) 120+2'; Diouf 120+4'	Stadium: Gaziantep Stadium; Referee: Yiğit Arslan
	Penalties
	Maxim (penalty scored); Figueiredo (penalty scored); Jevtović (penalty scored); Merkel (penalty scored); Cihan (penalty scored); Djilobodji (penalty scored); Eskihellaç (penalty scored)		(penalty scored) Dikmen; (penalty scored) Calvo; (penalty scored) Ülgün; (penalty scored) Guilherme; (penalty scored) Büyüksayar; (penalty scored) Pavičić; (penalty missed) Yazğılı

Quarter-finals	Sivasspor	3–0 (w/o)	Gaziantep	Sivas
		Report		Stadium: New 4 Eylül Stadium
