= 2020–21 Gaziantep F.K. season =

Gaziantep F.K.
2020–21 season
- Owner: Sanko Holding
- Chairman: Mehmet Büyükekşi
- Manager: Marius Șumudică (until 10 January 2021); Ricardo Sá Pinto (from 20 January 2021)
- Stadium: Gaziantep Arena
- Süper Lig: 5th
- Turkish Cup: Round of 16
- Top goalscorer: League: Alexandru Maxim (11); All: Alexandru Maxim (12)
Home colours	Away colours	Third colours

The 2020–21 season is Gaziantep F.K.'s 32nd season in existence and the club's 2nd consecutive season in the top flight of Turkish football. In addition to the domestic league, Gaziantep will participate in this season's editions of the Turkish Cup. The season covers the period from July 2020 to 30 June 2021.

== Players ==
=== First-team squad ===
As of 30 January 2021

Note: Flags indicate national team as defined under FIFA eligibility rules; some limited exceptions apply. Players may hold more than one non-FIFA nationality.

No.	Pos.	Nation	Player
1	GK	TUR	Günay Güvenç (Captain)
3	DF	SEN	Papy Djilobodji
4	DF	TUR	Ulaş Zengin
6	DF	ROU	Alin Toșca
7	MF	TUR	Kenan Özer
8	MF	BRA	Jefferson
9	FW	BRA	André Felipe
10	FW	TUR	Muhammet Demir (on loan from İstanbul Başakşehir)
11	MF	TUR	Güray Vural
13	DF	BRA	Júnior Morais
14	MF	TUR	Bilal Başaçıkoğlu
15	DF	TUR	Ertuğrul Ersoy (on loan from Le Havre)
16	DF	POL	Paweł Olkowski
17	DF	TUR	Oğuz Ceylan
20	MF	SRB	Marko Đorđević

No.	Pos.	Nation	Player
24	DF	POR	Roderick Miranda
25	GK	TUR	Çağlar Akbaba
26	MF	TUR	Mirza Cihan
27	MF	BEL	Kevin Mirallas
28	MF	POR	André Sousa
32	MF	IRQ	Osama Rashid
44	MF	ROU	Alexandru Maxim
55	MF	GHA	Abdul Aziz Tetteh
71	GK	TUR	Mustafa Burak Bozan
74	MF	SLO	Amedej Vetrih
76	DF	CMR	Jean-Armel Kana-Biyik (Vice-captain)
77	MF	TUR	Cenk Şahin
88	MF	TUR	Furkan Soyalp
94	FW	MLI	Nouha Dicko

=== Out on loan ===
Note: Flags indicate national team as defined under FIFA eligibility rules; some limited exceptions apply. Players may hold more than one non-FIFA nationality.

No.	Pos.	Nation	Player
—	MF	TUR	Hasan Yurtseven (at Kozanspor)
—	FW	TUR	Yusuf Türk (at Karacabey Belediyespor)

== Transfers ==
=== In ===
No.	Pos	Player	Transferred from	Fee	Date	Source
15			TBD		1 July 2020	

=== Out ===
No.	Pos	Player	Transferred to	Fee	Date	Source
15			TBD		1 July 2020	

== Competitions ==
=== Overview ===
Competition	First match	Last match	Starting round	Final position	Record							
Competition	First match	Last match	Starting round	Final position	Pld	W	D	L	GF	GA	GD	Win %
Süper Lig	12 September 2020	May 2021	Matchday 1		28	11	10	7	40	32	+8	39.29
Turkish Cup	25 November 2020	13 January 2021	Fourth round	Round of 16	3	2	0	1	7	4	+3	66.67
Total					31	13	10	8	47	36	+11	41.94

Last updated: 6 March 2021
Source: Soccerway

=== Süper Lig ===
==== League table ====
Pos	Team	Pld	W	D	L	GF	GA	GD	Pts
7	Alanyaspor	40	17	9	14	58	45	+13	60
8	Fatih Karagümrük	40	16	12	12	64	52	+12	60
9	Gaziantep	40	15	13	12	59	51	+8	58
10	Göztepe	40	13	12	15	59	59	0	51
11	Konyaspor	40	12	14	14	49	48	+1	50

Source: Süper Lig, Soccerway
Rules for classification: 1) Points; 2) Head-to-head points; 3) Head-to-head goal difference; 4) Head-to-head goals scored; 5) Goal difference; 6) Goals scored; 7) Play-off.

==== Results summary ====
Overall								Home						Away					
Pld	W	D	L	GF	GA	GD	Pts	W	D	L	GF	GA	GD	W	D	L	GF	GA	GD
12	5	6	1	20	15	+5	21	3	3	0	12	7	+5	2	3	1	8	8	0

Last updated: 19 December 2020.

==== Results by round ====
Round	1	2	3	4	5	6	7	8	9	10	11	12	13	14	15	16	17	18	19	20	21	22	23	24	25	26	27	28	29	30	31	32	33	34	35	36	37	38	39	40	41	42
Ground	A	H	A	H	A	H	A	H	A	H	B	A	H	A	H	A	H	A	H	A	H	H	A	H	A	H	A	H	A	H	A	B	H	A	H	A	H	A	H	A	H	A
Result	L	D	D	D	D	W	D	W	W	D	B	W	W	W	W	D	W	L	W	L	D	L	L	W	L	D	D	W	L			B										
Position	15	14	15	17	17	13	11	10	6	7	8	6	5	5	4	5	3	4	3	4	4	6	6	7	7	7	7	7														

Updated to match(es) played on 6 March 2021. Source: TFF.org
A = Away; H = Home; B = Bye; W = Win; D = Draw; L = Loss

Note: Since the league has been expanded to 21 teams each team will earn a bye twice this season.

==== Matches ====
12 September 2020 1	Galatasaray	3–1	Gaziantep	Istanbul
21:00	Falcao 8' (pen.) 40'; Luyindama (yellow card) 23'; Kılınç 28'; Belhanda (yellow card) 78'	Report	Aktaş (yellow card) 7'; André 53'; Júnior Morais (yellow card) 63'; Jefferson (yellow card) 82'	Stadium: Türk Telekom Stadium; Attendance: 0 Referee: Bahattin Şimşek

20 September 2020 2	Gaziantep	2–2	Fatih Karagümrük	Gaziantep
20:00	Kana-Biyik 53'; André 59'; Jefferson (yellow card) 75'; Demir (yellow card) 83'	Report	Sobiech (yellow card) 17'; Zukanović 26'; Sabo (yellow card) 41'; Erdinç 90+5'	Stadium: Gaziantep Arena; Attendance: 0 Referee: Alper Ulusoy

26 September 2020 3	Göztepe	2–2	Gaziantep	İzmir
17:00	Öztürk (yellow card) 37'; Akbunar (yellow card) 43'; Aydoğdu 50'; Ideye 61'; Kayan (yellow card) 88'	Report	Demir 7'; Olkowski (yellow card) 82'; Maxim 90+1' (pen.)	Stadium: Gürsel Aksel Stadium; Attendance: 0 Referee: Yasin Kol

2 October 2020 4	Gaziantep	1–1	Trabzonspor	Gaziantep
21:00	Ceylan (yellow card) 45+4'; Maxim (yellow card) 50' (goal) 90+3' (pen.); Júnior Morais (yellow card) 62'; Kožulj (yellow card) 68'	Report	Campi 64'; Flávio (yellow card) 72' (yellow-red card) 90'	Stadium: Gaziantep Arena; Attendance: 0 Referee: Fırat Aydınus

18 October 2020 5	Antalyaspor	1–1	Gaziantep	Antalya
17:00	Sam 3' (red card) 76'; Sari (yellow card) 31'; Kudryashov (yellow card) 49'; Sinik (yellow card) 86'; Akyol (yellow card) 90+4' (yellow-red card) 90+6'	Report	Júnior Morais (yellow card) 15' (yellow-red card) 65'; Mirallas (yellow card) 26' (yellow-red card) 28'; Djilobodji (yellow card) 38'; Soyalp 70'	Stadium: Antalya Stadyumu; Attendance: 0 Referee: Koray Gençerler

24 October 2020 6	Gaziantep	1–0	Konyaspor	Gaziantep
17:00	Dicko (yellow card) 24'; Vural (yellow card) 34'; Vetrih (yellow card) 53'; Demir 75'	Report	Guilherme (yellow card) 22'; Milošević (yellow card) 36'; Miya (yellow card) 42'; Çalık (yellow card) 90+3'; Šehić (yellow card) 90+4'	Stadium: Gaziantep Arena; Attendance: 0 Referee: Özgür Yankaya

31 October 2020 7	Gençlerbirliği	1–1	Gaziantep	Ankara
13:30	Yıldırım (yellow card) 45'; Candeias 56' (yellow card) 71'; Dikmen (yellow card) 84'	Report	Maxim 17' (pen.); André Sousa (yellow card) 50'; Mirallas (yellow card) 73'; Júnior Morais (yellow card) 85'	Stadium: Eryaman Stadyumu; Attendance: 0 Referee: Turgut Doman

6 November 2020 8	Gaziantep	3–1	Beşiktaş	Gaziantep
20:00	Dicko (yellow card) 24'; Mirallas 44' (yellow card) 90+1'; Demir 63'; Özer 90+8'	Report	Destanoğlu (red card) 55'; Larin 61'; Rosier (yellow card) 90+4'	Stadium: Gaziantep Arena; Attendance: 0 Referee: Yaşar Uğurlu

21 November 2020 9	Denizlispor	0–1	Gaziantep	Denizli
16:00	Bergdich (yellow card) 50'; Murawski (yellow card) 72'	Report	Özer 25'; Kana-Biyik (yellow card) 44'; Toșca (yellow card) 74'; Soyalp (yellow card) 90+5'	Stadium: Denizli Atatürk Stadium; Attendance: 0 Referee: Atilla Karaoğlan

28 November 2020 10	Gaziantep	2–2	Yeni Malatyaspor	Gaziantep
13:30	Mirallas 19'; Demir (yellow card) 44'; Maxim (yellow card) 45+4'; Özer (yellow card) 45+4'; Ceylan (yellow card) 45+6' (yellow-red card) 48'; Toșca (yellow card) 52'; Kana-Biyik 74'	Report	Büyük 49'; Acquah (yellow card) 51'; Kanatsızkuş (yellow card) 65'; Karim Hafez (yellow card) 84'; Topalli 90+5'	Stadium: Gaziantep Arena; Attendance: 0 Referee: Ali Palabıyık

11	Bye

13 December 2020 12	İstanbul Başakşehir	1–2	Gaziantep	Istanbul
19:00	Crivelli 56'; Türüç (yellow card) 65'; Uçar (yellow card) 90+3'	Report	Maxim (yellow card) 11'; Mirallas 44'; Demir 74'	Stadium: Başakşehir Fatih Terim Stadium; Attendance: 0 Referee: Abdulkadir Bitigen

19 December 2020 13	Gaziantep	3–1	Fenerbahçe	Gaziantep
19:00	Vetrih 10' (yellow card) 67'; Maxim 40' (pen.); Djilobodji (yellow card) 53'; André Sousa (yellow card) 81'; Özer 90+5'	Report	Pelkas 24' (yellow card) 59'; Sangaré (yellow card) 38'; Ademi (yellow card) 90+5'	Stadium: Gaziantep Arena; Attendance: 0 Referee: Cüneyt Çakır

23 December 2020 14	Kasımpaşa	0–4	Gaziantep	Istanbul
19:00		Report	Maxim 9' (pen.), 25'; Jefferson 57'; Demir 79'	Stadium: Recep Tayyip Erdoğan Stadium; Attendance: 0 Referee: Koray Gençerler

27 December 2020 15	Gaziantep	3–1	Alanyaspor	Gaziantep
13:30	Dicko 9'; Demir 29'; Maxim 60'	Report	Vetrih 26' (o.g.)	Stadium: Gaziantep Arena; Attendance: 0 Referee: Yaşar Kemal Uğurlu; Fourth official: Kadir Sağlam

2 January 2021 16	BB Erzurumspor	1–1	Gaziantep	Erzurum
13:30	Başsan 90+6' (pen.)	Report	Mirallas 69'	Stadium: Kazım Karabekir Stadium; Attendance: 0 Referee: Tugay Kaan Numanoğlu; Fourth official: Cihan Aydın

5 January 2021 17	Gaziantep	2–0	Ankaragücü	Gaziantep
16:00	Maxim 69'; Şahin 90+6'	Report		Stadium: New Gaziantep Stadium; Attendance: 0 Referee: Alper Ulusoy; Fourth official: Murat Erdoğa

9 January 2021 18	Sivasspor	2–1	Gaziantep	Sivas
13:30	Arslan 41', 47' (yellow card) 43'; Yalçın (yellow card) 74'; Çiftçi (yellow card) 85'	Report	Maxim 4'; Vural (yellow card) 31'; Güvenç (yellow card) 37'; Aktaş (yellow card) 63'; Jefferson (red card) 79'	Stadium: 4 Eylül Stadium; Attendance: 0 Referee: Mustafa Öğretmenoğlu; Fourth official: Caner Ak

16 January 2021 19	Gaziantep	2–1	Kayserispor	Gaziantep
16:00	Kvržić 31' (o.g.); Maxim 77' (pen.)	Report	Kolovetsios 61'	Stadium: Gaziantep Arena; Attendance: 0 Referee: Halil Umut Meler; Fourth official: Emre Kargın

20 January 2021 20	Çaykur Rizespor	3–0	Gaziantep	Rize
16:00 TRT (UTC+3)	Škoda 42', 55' (pen.); Braian Samudio 88' (pen.)	Report		Stadium: Yeni Rize Şehir Stadium; Referee: Halis Özkahya
Note: Match was played behind closed doors due to the COVID-19 pandemic in Turkey.

24 January 2021 21	Gaziantep	1–1	Hatayspor	Gaziantep
19:00 TRT (UTC+3)	Maxim (yellow card) 23'; Demir (yellow card) 33'; Jefferson 30' (yellow card) 90+9'	Report	Canlı (yellow card) 18'; Abdioğlu (yellow card) 90+5'; Júnior Morais 90+8' (o.g.)	Stadium: New Gaziantep Stadium; Attendance: 0 Referee: Fırat Aydınus; Fourth official: Çağdaş Altay

29 January 2021 22	Gaziantep	1–2	Galatasaray	Gaziantep
19:00 TRT	Djilobodji (yellow card) 86'; Maxim 90+7' (pen.)	Report	Onyekuru 51', 79'; Muslera (yellow card) 90+6'; Saracchi (yellow card) 100'	Stadium: New Gaziantep Stadium; Attendance: 0 Referee: Mete Kalkavan; Assistant referees: Ceyhun Sesigüzel, Serkan Ok; Fourth official: Murat Erdoğan

3 February 2021 23	Fatih Karagümrük	2–0	Gaziantep	Istanbul
16:00	Ndao 58'; Borini 64'	Report		Stadium: Atatürk Olympic Stadium; Attendance: 0 Referee: Ali Palabıyık; Fourth official: Abdullah Taşkınsoy

13 February 2021 25	Trabzonspor	1–0	Gaziantep	Trabzon
16:00	Anthony Nwakaeme (yellow card) 56' (yellow-red card) 90+6'; Anastasios Bakasetas (yellow card) 60' (goal) 67'	Report	Kevin Mirallas (yellow card) 56'; Amedej Vetrih (yellow card) 60'; Ertuğrul Ersoy (yellow card) 76'; Alexandru Maxim (yellow card) 89'	Stadium: Şenol Güneş Stadium; Referee: Zorbay Küçük; Assistant referees: Kemal Yılmaz, Hakan Yemişken; Fourth official: Yiğit Arslan

6 March 2021 29	Beşiktaş	2–1	Gaziantep	Istanbul
19:00 TRT (UTC+3)	Aboubakar 15', 72'; Welinton (yellow card) 67'	Report	Vetrih (yellow card) 45+2'; Dicko 90' (pen.)	Stadium: Vodafone Park; Attendance: 0 Referee: Mete Kalkavan

=== Turkish Cup ===
25 November 2020 Fourth round	Gaziantep	3–0	Serik Belediyespor	Gaziantep
17:00 TRT (UTC+3)	André 20'; Jefferson (yellow card) 37'; Mirallas 72'; Demir 76'	Report	Murat Gürbüzerol (yellow card) 63'; Sefa Narin (yellow card) 77'	Stadium: Gaziantep Arena; Attendance: 0 Referee: Mustafa Filiz

16 December 2020 Fifth round	Gaziantep	3–2	Kocaelispor	Gaziantep
14:00 TRT (UTC+3)	Jefferson (yellow card) 3'; Kožulj 39'; Uğurlu (yellow card) 44'; Mirallas 65'; Maxim 81'; André (yellow card) 90+6'	Report	Köse 15'; Başaran (yellow card) 18'; Cerem Talha Dinçer 88'; Taha Batuhan Yayıkcı (yellow card) 90+1'	Stadium: Gaziantep Arena; Attendance: 0 Referee: Kadir Sağlam

13 January 2021 Round of 16	Konyaspor	2–1	Gaziantep	Konya
15:45 TRT (UTC+3)	Anicic 11'; Şahiner 40'		Demir 90+4'	Stadium: Medaş Konya Büyükşehir
