= 2019–20 Gaziantep F.K. season =

Gaziantep F.K.
2019–20 season
- Chairman: Mehmet Büyükekşi
- Manager: Marius Șumudică
- Stadium: Gaziantep Arena
- Süper Lig: 8th
- Turkish Cup: Fifth round
- Top goalscorer: Olarenwaju Kayode (10)
Home colours	Away colours	Third colours

The 2019–20 season was Gaziantep F.K.'s 32nd year in existence. In addition to the domestic league, Gaziantep F.K. participated in the Turkish Cup.

== Squad ==
As of 28 January 2020.

Note: Flags indicate national team as defined under FIFA eligibility rules; some limited exceptions apply. Players may hold more than one non-FIFA nationality.

No.	Pos.	Nation	Player
1	GK	TUR	Günay Güvenç (captain)
3	DF	SEN	Papy Djilobodji
4	DF	TUR	Ulaş Zengin
5	MF	TUR	Kubilay Aktaş
6	DF	ROU	Alin Toșca
7	MF	TUR	Kenan Özer
8	MF	BRA	Jefferson
9	FW	POL	Bartłomiej Pawłowski
10	FW	NGA	Olarenwaju Kayode (on loan from Shakhtar Donetsk)
11	MF	TUR	Güray Vural
13	DF	BRA	Júnior Morais
14	FW	TUR	Muhammet Demir (on loan from İstanbul Başakşehir)
15	MF	GHA	Raman Chibsah
16	DF	POL	Paweł Olkowski

No.	Pos.	Nation	Player
17	DF	TUR	Oğuz Ceylan
18	MF	MLI	Souleymane Diarra
19	MF	TUR	Furkan Soyalp (on loan from İstanbul Başakşehir)
23	MF	TUR	Mehmet Erdem Uğurlu
25	GK	TUR	Haydar Yılmaz
27	FW	GHA	Patrick Twumasi (on loan from Deportivo Alavés)
28	MF	POR	André Sousa
44	MF	ROU	Alexandru Maxim (on loan from Mainz)
55	MF	GHA	Abdul Aziz Tetteh
71	GK	TUR	Mustafa Burak Bozan
76	DF	CMR	Jean-Armel Kana-Biyik
88	FW	TUR	Muğdat Çelik
97	FW	TUR	Hasan Yurtseven

== Süper Lig ==
=== League table ===
Pos	Team	Pld	W	D	L	GF	GA	GD	Pts	Qualification or relegation
6	Galatasaray	34	15	11	8	55	37	+18	56	Qualification for the Europa League second qualifying round
7	Fenerbahçe	34	15	8	11	58	46	+12	53	
8	Gaziantep	34	11	13	10	49	50	−1	46	
9	Antalyaspor	34	11	12	11	41	52	−11	45	
10	Kasımpaşa	34	12	7	15	53	58	−5	43	

Source: Süper Lig, Soccerway
Rules for classification: 1) Points; 2) Head-to-head points; 3) Head-to-head goal difference; 4) Head-to-head goals scored; 5) Goal difference; 6) Goals scored; 7) Play-off.

Galibiyet Beraberlik Mağlubiyet

=== Results summary ===
Overall								Home						Away					
Pld	W	D	L	GF	GA	GD	Pts	W	D	L	GF	GA	GD	W	D	L	GF	GA	GD
32	10	12	10	46	48	−2	42	6	6	4	28	19	+9	4	6	6	18	29	−11

Source: TFF

=== Results by round ===
Round	1	2	3	4	5	6	7	8	9	10	11	12	13	14	15	16	17	18	19	20	21	22	23	24	25	26	27	28	29	30	31	32	33	34
Ground	A	H	A	H	A	H	H	A	H	A	H	A	H	A	H	A	H	H	A	H	A	H	A	A	H	A	H	A	H	A	H	A	H	A
Result	L	W	D	W	W	D	L	L	D	W	L	D	L	D	W	W	D	L	L	W	L	W	D	L	D	L	D	D	D	W	W	D		
Position	18	10	11	6	3	3	8	9	10	9	9	10	12	11	11	10	9	10	10	9	9	9	9	9	9	9	9	10	10	9	8	8		

Updated to match(es) played on 16 July 2020. Source: TFF.org
A = Away; H = Home; W = Win; D = Draw; L = Loss

== Matches ==
August 19, 2019 1	Fenerbahçe	5–0	Gaziantep	Istanbul
20.00	Victor Moses 6' (pen.) (penalty missed) 13'; Vedat Muriqi 17'; Emre Belözoğlu 24' (pen.); Nabil Dirar 74'; Ferdi Kadioglu 88'; Vedat Muriqi (yellow card) 90'	Report	(yellow card) 12' Yussif Chibsah; (yellow card) 50' Abdul Aziz Tetteh; (yellow card) 80' Jefferson; (yellow card) 90' Souleymane Diarra	Stadium: Şükrü Saracoğlu Stadyumu; Referee: Arda Kardeşler; Assistant referees: Kemal Yılmaz, Hakan Yemişken; Fourth official: Serkan Tokat; Fifth official: Yaşar Kemal Uğurlu, Kerem Ersoy

August 26, 2019 2	Gazişehir Gaziantep	4–1	Gençlerbirliği	Gaziantep
20.00	Olarenwaju Kayode 32', 40' (pen.); Papy Djilobodji (yellow card) 45'; Güray Vural 56'; Oğuz Ceylan 72'	Report	(red card) 27' Ahmet Oğuz; (red card) 38' Pierre-Yves Polomat; (yellow card) 40' Zargo Touré; 69' Berat Özdemir	Stadium: New Gaziantep Stadium; Referee: Atilla Karaoğlan; Assistant referees: İsmail Şencan, Samet Çiçek; Fourth official: Cihan Aydın; Fifth official: Ümit Öztürk, Emre Malok

September 1, 2019 3	Sivasspor	1–1	Gazişehir Gaziantep	Sivas
19.15	Isaac Cofie (yellow card) 8'; Aaron Appindangoyé (yellow card) 57'; Emre Kılınç (yellow card) 61'; Arouna Koné 72'	Report	(yellow card) 30' Oğuz Ceylan; 35' (yellow card) 76' Patrick Twumasi; (yellow card) 70' Günay Güvenç; (yellow card) 90' Kenan Özer	Stadium: New Sivas 4 Eylül Stadium; Referee: Hüseyin Göçek; Assistant referees: Alpaslan Dedeş, Abdullah Bora Özkara; Fourth official: Oğuzhan Uğurlu; Fifth official: Bülent Birincioğlu, Serkan Olguncan

September 14, 2019 4	Gazişehir Gaziantep	3–2	Beşiktaş	Gaziantep
20.00	Patrick Twumasi 8' (pen.); Souleymane Diarra (yellow card) 19'; Günay Güvenç (yellow card) 54'; Güray Vural 58'; Olarenwaju Kayode (red card) 75'; Yussif Chibsah 79'; Muhammet Demir (yellow card) 90'; Oğuz Ceylan (yellow card) 90'	Report	(red card) 6' Domagoj Vida; (yellow card) 47' Víctor Ruiz; (yellow card) 54' Adem Ljajić; (red card) 76' Mohamed Elneny; 83' Umut Nayir; 84' Atiba Hutchinson; (yellow card) 88' Caner Erkin; (yellow card) 90' Tyler Boyd	Stadium: New Gaziantep Stadium; Referee: Halil Umut Meler; Assistant referees: Mustafa Emre Eyisoy, Cevdet Kömürcüoğlu; Fourth official: Yasin Kol; Fifth official: Alper Ulusoy, Tarık Ongun

September 22, 2019 5	Çaykur Rizespor	1–2	Gazişehir Gaziantep	Rize
14.00	Yan Sasse (yellow card) 59'; Braian Samudio 65'; Joseph Larweh Attamah (yellow card) 73'	Report	12' Muhammet Demir; 16' Patrick Twumasi; (yellow card) 70' Souleymane Diarra; (yellow card) 75' Oğuz Ceylan	Stadium: Yeni Rize Şehir Stadium; Attendance: 6.214; Referee: Serkan Tokat; Assistant referees: Candaş Elbil, Bilal Gölen; Fourth official: Mustafa Aydın; Fifth official: Bahattin Şimşek, Çağdaş Altay

September 30, 2019 6	Gaziantep	1–1	Göztepe	Gaziantep
20.00	Souleymane Diarra (yellow card) 31'; Güray Vural 58'; Júnior Morais (yellow card) 66'	Report	(red card) 50' Beto; (yellow card) 63' Serdar Gürler; 82' Berkan Emir; (yellow card) 89' Márcio Mossoró; (yellow card) 90' Göktuğ Bakırbaş; (yellow card) 90' Lamine Gassama	Stadium: New Gaziantep Stadium; Attendance: 7.676; Referee: Ali Şansalan; Assistant referees: Erdinç Sezertam, İsmail Şencan; Fourth official: Selim Özen; Fifth official: Mustafa Öğretmenoğlu, Ramazan Keleş

October 6, 2019 7	Gaziantep	1–2	İstanbul Başakşehir	Gaziantep
19.00	Güray Vural (red card) 18'; Patrick Twumasi 24'; Jean-Armel Kana-Biyik (yellow card) 86'	Report	13', 71' Enzo Crivelli; (yellow card) 22' Fredrik Gulbrandsen; (yellow card) 30' Okechukwu Godson Azubuike; (yellow card) 44' Alexandru Epureanu; (yellow card) 58' Eljero Elia; (yellow card) 66' İrfan Kahveci; (yellow card) 90+2' Demba Ba	Stadium: New Gaziantep Stadium; Attendance: 8.875; Referee: Koray Gençerler; Assistant referees: Yusuf Bozdoğan, Murat Ergin Gözütok; Fourth official: Erkan Engin; Fifth official: Ümit Öztürk, Ceyhun Sesigüzel

October 19, 2019 8	Trabzonspor	4–1	Gaziantep	Trabzon
17.30	Daniel Sturridge 9'; Alexander Sørloth 14'; José Sosa (yellow card) 26' (goal) 75'; Yusuf Sari 80'	Report	54' Jefferson Nogueira Júnior; (yellow card) 84' Olarenwaju Kayode	Stadium: Şenol Güneş Stadium; Attendance: 26.923; Referee: Özgür Yankaya; Assistant referees: Süleyman Özay, Mehmet Cem Hanoğlu; Fourth official: Direnç Tonusluoğlu; Fifth official: Tugay Kaan Numanoğlu, Esat Sancaktar

October 26, 2019 9	Gaziantep	1–1	Alanyaspor	Gaziantep
17.30	Raman Chibsah (yellow card) 45'; Jefferson Nogueira Júnior (yellow card) 84'; Jean-Armel Kana-Biyik 90'; Oğuz Ceylan (yellow card) 90+3'	Report	33' Papiss Cissé; (yellow card) 66' Kaan Kanak; (yellow card) 90' Ceyhun Gülselam; (yellow card) 90+3' Yacine Bammou	Stadium: New Gaziantep Stadium; Attendance: 5.663; Referee: Serkan Tokat; Assistant referees: Mustafa Sönmez, Samet Çavuş; Fourth official: Gürel Uzuner; Fifth official: Fırat Aydınus, Murat Erdoğan

November 4, 2019 10	MKE Ankaragücü	1–2	Gaziantep	Ankara
20.00	Tiago Pinto (yellow card) 43'; İlhan Parlak 68' (yellow card) 90+2'	Report	29' (pen.) Patrick Twumasi; (yellow card) 43' (goal) 90+3' Papy Djilobodji; (yellow card) 74' Souleymane Diarra	Stadium: Eryaman Stadium; Attendance: 3.427; Referee: Halil Umut Meler; Assistant referees: Cevdet Kömürcüoğlu, Kamil Çetin; Fourth official: Erkan Engin; Fifth official: Alper Ulusoy, Yiğit Arslan

November 9, 2019 11	Gaziantep	0–2	Galatasaray	Gaziantep
20.00	Paweł Olkowski (yellow card) 6'; Oğuz Ceylan (yellow card) 45'; Papy Djilobodji (yellow card) 79'	Report	21' Ömer Bayram; 43' Sofiane Feghouli; (yellow card) 62' Mario Lemina	Stadium: New Gaziantep Stadium; Attendance: 15.648; Referee: Cüneyt Çakır; Assistant referees: Bahattin Duran, Tarık Ongun; Fourth official: Onur Özütoprak; Fifth official: Volkan Bayarslan, Kerem Ersoy

November 25, 2019 12	Antalyaspor	1–1	Gaziantep	Antalya
20.00	Charles Fernando Basílio da Silva (yellow card) 45+1'; Nazım Sangaré 84'; Paul Mukairu (yellow card) 90+5'	Report	(yellow card) 13' Furkan Soyalp; (yellow card) 20' Jefferson Nogueira Júnior; (yellow card) 33' Oğuz Ceylan; 37' Papy Djilobodji	Stadium: New Antalya Stadium; Attendance: 7.517; Referee: Hüseyin Göçek; Assistant referees: Abdullah Bora Özkara, Deniz Caner Özaral; Fourth official: Mustafa İlker Coşkun; Fifth official: Bahattin Şimşek, Kemal Yılmaz

December 1, 2019 13	Gaziantep	1–2	Denizlispor	Gaziantep
14.00	Furkan Soyalp (yellow card) 19'; Olarenwaju Kayode 54'; Oğuz Ceylan (yellow card) 83'; Raman Chibsah (yellow card) 90'	Report	(yellow card) 15' (goal) 58', 85' Hadi Sacko; (yellow card) 65' Ismaïl Aissati; (yellow card) 75' Mustafa Yumlu; (yellow card) 78' Zakarya Bergdich; (yellow card) 83' Modou Barrow	Stadium: New Gaziantep Stadium; Attendance: 5.127; Referee: Atilla Karaoğlan; Assistant referees: İsmail Şencan, Samet Çiçek; Fourth official: Tarık Güldal; Fifth official: Sarper Barış Saka, Erkan Özdamar

December 8, 2019 14	Konyaspor	0–0	Gaziantep	Konya
14.00	Deni Milošević (yellow card) 29'; Selim Ay (yellow card) 88'	Report	(yellow card) 53' Jefferson Nogueira Júnior	Stadium: Büyükşehir Belediye Stadyumu; Attendance: 11.041; Referee: Ali Palabıyık; Assistant referees: Mehmet Cem Satman, Mustafa Sönmez; Fourth official: Şeref Taştan; Fifth official: Özgüç Türkalp, Emre Malok

December 15, 2019 15	Gaziantep	3–0	Kayserispor	Gaziantep
14.00	Raman Chibsah (yellow card) 5'; Güray Vural 67' (yellow card) 69'; Olarenwaju Kayode 72', 90'	Report	(yellow card) 75' Mert Kula; (yellow card) 90' Miguel Lopes	Stadium: New Gaziantep Stadium; Attendance: 4.695; Referee: Özgür Yankaya; Assistant referees: Mehmet Metin, Yusuf Bozdoğan; Fourth official: Burak Pakkan; Fifth official: Halil Umut Meler, Kemal Yılmaz

December 21, 2019 16	Kasımpaşa	3–4	Gaziantep	Istanbul
17.30	Veysel Sarı 10'; Fatih Öztürk (yellow card) 10'; Aytaç Kara (yellow card) 51'; Ricardo Quaresma 57' (penalty missed) 75'; Abdul Khalili (yellow card) 65'; Mame Baba Thiam 80'; İlhan Depe (yellow card) 88'	Report	5', 44' Olarenwaju Kayode; (yellow card) 8' Souleymane Diarra; 21' Kenan Özer; 33' Papy Djilobodji; (yellow card) 73' Günay Güvenç	Stadium: Recep Tayyip Erdoğan Stadium; Attendance: 1.993; Referee: Abdulkadir Bitigen; Assistant referees: Volkan Ahmet Narinç, Hakan Yemişken; Fourth official: Mustafa Aydın; Fifth official: Yaşar Kemal Uğurlu, Hakan Ceylan

December 29, 2019 17	Gaziantep	1–1	Yeni Malatyaspor	Gaziantep
16.30	Olarenwaju Kayode 21'; Güray Vural (yellow card) 33' (yellow card) 49' (red card); Kenan Özer (yellow card) 36'; Jean-Armel Kana-Biyik (yellow card) 51'; Jefferson Nogueira Júnior (yellow card) 53'	Report	(yellow card) 31' Guilherme Costa Marques; (yellow card) 42' Teenage Hadebe; (yellow card) 45+2' (goal) 78' Thievy Bifouma; (yellow card) 54' Robin Yalçın; (red card) 54' Adis Jahović	Stadium: New Gaziantep Stadium; Attendance: 5.248; Referee: Bahattin Şimşek; Assistant referees: Alpaslan Dedeş, Mustafa Savranlar; Fourth official: Çağdaş Altay; Fifth official: Mustafa Öğretmenoğlu, Murat Erdoğan

January 18, 2020 18	Gaziantep	0–2	Fenerbahçe	Gaziantep
20.00	Jefferson (yellow card) 8'; Oğuz Ceylan (yellow card) 12'; Souleymane Diarra (yellow card) 39'; Raman Chibsah (yellow card) 63'; Júnior Morais (yellow card) 70'	Report	(yellow card) 18' Tolga Ciğerci; (yellow card) 27' Altay Bayındır; 51' Max Kruse; (yellow card) 57' Serdar Aziz; (yellow card) 80' (yellow card) 90' (red card) (goal) 90' Vedat Muriqi	Stadium: New Gaziantep Stadium; Attendance: 15.024; Referee: Hüseyin Göçek; Assistant referees: Esat Sancaktar, Serkan Ok; Fourth official: Kutluhan Bilgiç; Fifth official: Koray Gençerler, Mert Güzenge

January 24, 2020 19	Gençlerbirliği	1–0	Gaziantep	Ankara
20.00	Giovanni Sio (yellow card) 43'; Pierre-Yves Polomat (yellow card) 56'; Stéphane Sessègnon 64' (pen.); Kristoffer Nordfeldt (yellow card) 79'	Report	(penalty missed) 58' Olarenwaju Kayode; (yellow card) 62' Jean-Armel Kana-Biyik; (yellow card) 76' Kenan Özer	Stadium: Eryaman Stadium; Attendance: 2.428; Referee: Mete Kalkavan; Assistant referees: Özgür Ertem, Osman Gökhan Bilir; Fourth official: Şeref Taştan; Fifth official: Halis Özkahya, Abdullah Buğra Taşkınsoy

February 2, 2020 20	Gaziantep	5–1	Sivasspor	Gaziantep
16.00	Alexandru Maxim 4', 44'; Muhammet Demir 39'; Papy Djilobodji (yellow card) 40'; Olarenwaju Kayode (yellow card) 45+4'; Güray Vural (yellow card) 53'; Souleymane Diarra 78'; Kenan Özer 86'	Report	31' (yellow card) 88' Hakan Arslan; (yellow card) 44' Erdoğan Yeşilyurt; (yellow card) 46' Mert Hakan Yandaş; (yellow card) 60' Mustapha Yatabaré	Stadium: New Gaziantep Stadium; Attendance: 9.357; Referee: Arda Kardeşler; Assistant referees: Aleks Taşcıoğlu, Mehmet Metin; Fourth official: Adnan Deniz Kayatepe; Fifth official: Mert Güzenge, Mustafa Kürşad Filiz

February 8, 2020 21	Beşiktaş	3–0	Gaziantep	Istanbul
17.00	Georges-Kévin Nkoudou (yellow card) 39'; Burak Yılmaz 52' (pen.); Gökhan Gönül (yellow card) 54'; Kevin-Prince Boateng 70'; Caner Erkin (yellow card) 79'; Jeremain Lens 90+5'	Report	(yellow card) 47' Jean-Armel Kana-Biyik; (yellow card) 88' Kenan Özer	Stadium: Vodafone Park; Attendance: 26.436; Referee: Alper Ulusoy; Assistant referees: Ali Saygın Ögel, Mehmet Cem Hanoğlu; Fourth official: Turgut Doman; Fifth official: Atilla Karaoğlan, Ekrem Kan

February 17, 2020 22	Gaziantep	2–0	Çaykur Rizespor	Gaziantep
20.00	Alexandru Maxim (yellow card) 18'; Kubilay Aktaş (yellow card) 39'; André Sousa 52'; Muhammet Demir (penalty missed) 56' (penalty missed) 61'; Papy Djilobodji 90+1'	Report	(yellow card) 33' Oğuz Kağan Güçtekin; (yellow card) 50' (yellow card) 56' (red card) Ivanildo Fernandes; (yellow card) 60' Montassar Talbi	Stadium: New Gaziantep Stadium; Attendance: 6.199; Referee: Ali Palabıyık; Assistant referees: Erdinç Sezertam, Serkan Olguncan; Fourth official: Mert Güzenge; Fifth official: Halil Umut Meler, Oğuzhan Uğurlu

February 22, 2020 23	Göztepe	1–1	Gaziantep	İzmir
17.00	Serdar Gürler (yellow card) 36'; Cameron Jerome 71'; Alpaslan Öztürk (yellow card) 90+2'	Report	(yellow card) 46' Andre Sousa; (yellow card) 58' Alexandru Maxim; (yellow card) 63' Olarenwaju Kayode; 90+2' Souleymane Diarra	Stadium: Gürsel Aksel Stadium; Attendance: 16.143; Referee: Suat Arslanboğa; Assistant referees: Özgür Ertem, Samet Çiçek; Fourth official: Sinan Dereci; Fifth official: Erkan Özdamar, Mustafa Kürşad Filiz

March 2, 2020 24	İstanbul Başakşehir	3–1	Gaziantep	Istanbul
20.00	Martin Škrtel (yellow card) 38'; Gaël Clichy 51'; İrfan Kahveci 63'; Demba Ba 76'	Report	72' Kenan Özer	Stadium: Başakşehir Fatih Terim Stadium; Attendance: 1.988; Referee: Zorbay Küçük; Assistant referees: Alpaslan Dedeş, İlker Takpak; Fourth official: Ferhan Kastanlıoğlu; Fifth official: Mustafa Öğretmenoğlu, Abdullah Buğra Taşkınsoy

March 7, 2020 25	Gaziantep	1–1	Trabzonspor	Gaziantep
17.00	Olarenwaju Kayode 53'; Güray Vural (yellow card) 87'; Souleymane Diarra (yellow card) 90+6'	Report	22' Caleb Ekuban; (yellow card) 26' José Sosa; (yellow card) 42' John Obi Mikel; (yellow card) 57' Manuel da Costa; (yellow card) 87' Guilherme; (yellow card) 90+8' Abdülkadir Ömür	Stadium: New Gaziantep Stadium; Attendance: 11.917; Referee: Halis Özkahya; Assistant referees: İbrahim Çağlar Uyarcan, Volkan Ahmet Narinç; Fourth official: Hakan Ceylan; Fifth official: Özgüç Türkalp, Serkan Ok

March 14, 2020 26	Alanyaspor	1–0	Gaziantep	Alanya, Antalya
17.00	Steven Caulker 42'	Report	(yellow card) 15' Oğuz Ceylan; (yellow card) 76' Júnior Morais; (yellow card) 80' Papy Djilobodji	Stadium: Bahçeşehir Okulları Stadium; Attendance: 0 Referee: Atilla Karaoğlan; Assistant referees: Mehmet Kısal, Bahtiyar Birinci; Fourth official: Mustafa Aydın; Fifth official: Bahattin Şimşek, Burak Pakkan

June 14, 2020 27	Gaziantep	1–1	MKE Ankaragücü	Gaziantep
21.00	Alexandru Maxim 25' (pen.); Souleymane Diarra (yellow card) 68'; Patrick Twumasi (yellow card) 85'; Júnior Morais (yellow card) 90'	Report	(yellow card) 32' Daniel Łukasik; 51' Óscar Scarione; (yellow card) 73' Michał Pazdan; (yellow card) 90+4' Sedat Ağçay	Stadium: New Gaziantep Stadium; Attendance: 0 Referee: Mete Kalkavan; Assistant referees: Ceyhun Sesigüzel, Esat Sancaktar; Fourth official: Mustafa Kürşad Filiz; Fifth official: Hüseyin Göçek, Kutluhan Bilgiç

June 21, 2020 28	Galatasaray	3–3	Gaziantep	Istanbul
21.00	Radamel Falcao 36'; Younès Belhanda 40' (yellow card) 52'; Mariano (yellow card) 45+3'; Ahmet Çalık (red card) 56'; Marcelo Saracchi (yellow card) 63'; Sofiane Feghouli 66'; Okan Kocuk (yellow card) 90+10'; Henry Onyekuru (yellow card) MS'	Report	17' Papy Djilobodji; (yellow card) 52' Kenan Özer; 78' Patrick Twumasi; 90+12' (pen.) Alexandru Maxim	Stadium: Türk Telekom Stadium; Attendance: 0 Referee: Alper Ulusoy; Assistant referees: İsmail Şencan, Mustafa Sönmez; Fourth official: Erkan Özdamar; Fifth official: Cüneyt Çakır, Oğuzhan Uğurlu

June 28, 2020 29	Gaziantep	1–1	Antalyaspor	Gaziantep
21.00	Olarenwaju Kayode 58'; Oğuz Ceylan (yellow card) 73'; André Sousa (yellow card) 77'	Report	(yellow card) 53' (yellow card) 66' (red card) Hakan Özmert; (yellow card) 88' Ruud Boffin; 88' (pen.) Adis Jahović	Stadium: New Gaziantep Stadium; Attendance: 0 Referee: Serkan Tokat; Assistant referees: Özgür Ertem, Abdullah Bora Özkara; Fourth official: Caner Ak; Fifth official: Halil Umut Meler, Abdullah Buğra Taşkınsoy

July 3, 2020 30	Denizlispor	0–1	Gaziantep	Denizli
21.00	Mustafa Yumlu (yellow card) 17'; Oğuz Yılmaz (yellow card) 53'	Report	24' Güray Vural; (yellow card) 78' Kenan Özer	Stadium: Atatürk Stadyumu; Attendance: 0 Referee: Özgür Yankaya; Assistant referees: Mehmet Salih Mazlum, Bilal Gölen; Fourth official: Murat Erdoğan; Fifth official: Halis Özkahya, Yiğit Arslan

July 9, 2020 31	Gaziantep	3–1	Konyaspor	Gaziantep
21.00	Oğuz Ceylan (yellow card) 50'; Furkan Soyalp (yellow card) 71' (goal) 89'; Alexandru Maxim 87' (pen.); Bartłomiej Pawłowski 90+9'; Júnior Morais (yellow card) MS'	Report	13' (yellow card) 90+6' Deni Milošević; (yellow card) 45' Farouk Miya; (yellow card) 82' Ertuğrul Taşkıran; (yellow card) 90+1' Uğur Demirok; (yellow card) MS' Alper Uludağ	Stadium: New Gaziantep Stadium; Attendance: 0 Referee: Hüseyin Göçek; Assistant referees: Serkan Ok, Candaş Elbil; Fourth official: Turgut Doman; Fifth official: Koray Gençerler, Emre Kargın

July 13, 2020 32	Kayserispor	1–1	Gaziantep	Kayseri
18.30	Zoran Kvržić (yellow card) 54'; Bernard Mensah (red card) 74'; Diego Ângelo (red card) 87'; Artem Kravets 90+3'	Report	62' Alexandru Maxim; (yellow card) 74' Jefferson Nogueira Júnior; (yellow card) 85' Muhammet Demir; (yellow card) 88' Bartłomiej Pawłowski; (yellow card) 90+2' Júnior Morais	Stadium: Kadir Has Şehir Stadyumu; Attendance: 0 Referee: Halil Umut Meler; Assistant referees: Mustafa Emre Eyisoy, Cevdet Kömürcüoğlu; Fourth official: Ramazan Keleş; Fifth official: Koray Gençerler, Emre Malok

July 18, 2020 33	Gaziantep	2–2	Kasımpaşa	Gaziantep
21.00		Report		Stadium: New Gaziantep Stadium; Attendance: 0 Referee: Volkan Bayarslan; Assistant referees: Mehmet Metin, Asım Yusuf Öz; Fourth official: İlker Yasin Avcı

July 2020 34	Yeni Malatyaspor	0–1	Gaziantep	Malatya
		Report		Stadium: Malatya Arena

=== Türkiye Kupası ===
==== Fifth round ====
December 18, 2019	Gaziantep FK	3–2	Kırklarelispor	Gaziantep
14:30	Özer 12'; Demir 84'; Demir 90'		Pekesen 37'; Karaahmet 72'	Stadium: Kalyon

5 December 2019	Kırklarelispor	2–1	Gaziantep FK	Kirklareli
13:00	Sürmeli 45'; Koca 79'		Özer 87' (pen.)	Stadium: Kırklareli Atatürk
