= Alin Toșca =

Romanian footballer (born 1992)

Personal information
- Full name: Alin Dorinel Toșca
- Date of birth: 14 March 1992 (age 34)
- Place of birth: Alexandria, Romania
- Height: 1.81 m (5 ft 11 in)
- Position: Left-back

Youth career
- 2000–2007: Școala de Fotbal Florea Voicilă
- 2007–2009: Steaua București

Senior career*
Years	Team	Apps	(Gls)
2009–2011	Steaua II București	14	(0)
2010–2011	→ Unirea Urziceni (loan)	18	(0)
2011–2012	Săgeata Năvodari	23	(0)
2012–2014	Viitorul Constanța	54	(0)
2014–2017	Steaua București	65	(0)
2017–2019	Betis	23	(0)
2018	→ Benevento (loan)	13	(0)
2018–2019	→ PAOK (loan)	7	(0)
2019–2023	Gaziantep	105	(0)
2023–2025	Benevento	42	(1)
2023–2024	→ Al-Riyadh (loan)	11	(0)
2025–2026	Universitatea Cluj	1	(0)
Total		377	(1)

International career
2012–2014	Romania U21	10	(0)
2016–2022	Romania	30	(1)
- * Club domestic league appearances and goals as of 18 October 2025

Alin Dorinel Toșca (Romanian pronunciation: [aˈlin doriˈnel ˈtoʃka]; born 14 March 1992) is a Romanian former professional footballer who played as a left-back, currently a football agent.

== Club career ==
=== Early career ===
Born in Alexandria, Teleorman County, Toșca came through FC Steaua București's youth system and made his professional debut with its reserve team. He was loaned out to Unirea Urziceni where he played his first Liga I match on 11 September 2010, against Steaua.

Toșca also had a brief spell with Săgeata Năvodari before joining Viitorul Constanța in 2012, with which he made over 50 appearances.

=== Steaua București ===
In March 2014, it was announced that FC Steaua București signed Toșca for an undisclosed fee, with the player due to join the squad in the summer. He scored his first competitive goal for the club on 14 December 2014, contributing to a 3–0 away win over Politehnica Iași for the season's Cupa Ligii.

=== Betis ===
On 24 January 2017, Toșca moved to Spanish side Real Betis on a five-year deal for an undisclosed fee. He made his La Liga debut five days later, featuring the full 90 minutes against Barcelona in a 1–1 home draw.

After falling down the pecking order, Toșca agreed to a five-month loan deal with Italian club Benevento on 31 January 2018. On 24 August 2018, he was loaned to Greek first division club PAOK for the 2018–19 campaign with a purchase option.

=== Gaziantep ===
On 21 July 2019, after being released by Betis, he signed a two-year contract with Turkish side Gazişehir Gaziantep.

=== Return to Benevento ===
On 30 January 2023, Toșca signed with Benevento in Italy once again.

=== Al-Riyadh ===
On 20 July 2023, Toșca joined newly promoted Pro League side Al-Riyadh on loan.

== International career ==
Toșca earned his first cap for Romania on 23 March 2016, coming on as a late substitute in a 1–0 friendly win against Lithuania, in Giurgiu.

== Career statistics ==
=== Club ===
As of match played 4 December 2025

Appearances and goals by club, season and competition
Club	Season	League			National cup (Note: Includes Cupa României, Copa del Rey, Greek Cup, Turkish Cup, Coppa Italia Serie C, King's Cup)		League cup (Note: Includes Cupa Ligii)		Europe		Other		Total	
Club	Season	Division	Apps	Goals	Apps	Goals	Apps	Goals	Apps	Goals	Apps	Goals	Apps	Goals
Steaua II București	2009–10	Liga II	13	0	0	0	—		—		—		13	0
Steaua II București	2010–11	Liga II	1	0	0	0	—		—		—		1	0
Steaua II București	Total		14	0	0	0	—		—		—		14	0
Unirea Urziceni (loan)	2010–11	Liga I	18	0	1	0	—		—		—		19	0
Săgeata Năvodari	2011–12	Liga II	23	0	0	0	—		—		—		23	0
Viitorul Constanța	2012–13	Liga I	25	0	0	0	—		—		—		25	0
Viitorul Constanța	2013–14	Liga I	29	0	2	0	—		—		—		31	0
Viitorul Constanța	Total		54	0	2	0	—		—		—		56	0
Steaua București	2014–15	Liga I	15	0	5	0	4	1	0	0	0	0	24	1
Steaua București	2015–16	Liga I	34	0	1	0	2	0	5 (Note: Three appearances in UEFA Champions League, two appearances in UEFA Europa League)	0	1 (Note: Appearance in Supercupa României)	0	43	0
Steaua București	2016–17	Liga I	16	0	2	0	2	0	9 (Note: Three appearances in UEFA Champions League, six appearances in UEFA Europa League)	0	—		29	0
Steaua București	Total		65	0	8	0	8	1	14	0	1	0	96	1
Betis	2016–17	La Liga	17	0	—		—		—		—		17	0
Betis	2017–18	La Liga	6	0	2	0	—		—		—		8	0
Betis	Total		23	0	2	0	—		—		—		25	0
Benevento (loan)	2017–18	Serie A	13	0	—		—		—		—		13	0
PAOK (loan)	2018–19	Super League Greece	7	0	4	0	—		5 (Note: Appearances in UEFA Europa League)	0	—		16	0
Gaziantep	2019–20	Süper Lig	34	0	2	0	—		—		—		36	0
Gaziantep	2020–21	Süper Lig	32	0	1	0	—		—		—		15	0
Gaziantep	2021–22	Süper Lig	31	0	4	0	—		—		—		15	0
Gaziantep	2022–23	Süper Lig	8	0	3	0	—		—		—		11	0
Gaziantep	Total		105	0	10	0	—		—		—		115	0
Benevento	2022–23	Serie B	16	0	—		—		—		—		16	0
Benevento	2024–25	Serie C	26	1	1	0	—		—		—		27	1
Benevento	Total		42	1	1	0	—		—		—		43	1
Al-Riyadh (loan)	2023–24	Saudi Pro League	11	0	1	0	—		—		—		12	0
Universitatea Cluj	2025–26	Liga I	1	0	2	0	—		—		—		3	0
Career total			377	1	31	0	8	1	19	0	1	0	435	2

=== International ===
As of match played 29 March 2022

Appearances and goals by national team and year
National team	Year	Apps	Goals
Romania
Romania	2016	4	0
Romania	2017	6	0
Romania	2018	5	0
Romania	2019	3	0
Romania	2020	5	0
Romania	2021	5	1
Romania	2022	2	0
Total		30	1

Scores and results list Romania's goal tally first, score column indicates score after each Toșca goal.

List of international goals scored by Alin Toșca
No.	Date	Venue	Cap	Opponent	Score	Result	Competition
1	5 September 2021	Arena Națională, Bucharest, Romania	26	Liechtenstein	1–0	2–0	2022 FIFA World Cup qualification

== Honours ==
Steaua București

- Liga I: 2014–15
- Cupa României: 2014–15
- Cupa Ligii: 2014–15, 2015–16
- Supercupa României runner-up: 2014, 2015

PAOK

- Super League Greece: 2018–19
- Greek Cup: 2018–19

Universitatea Cluj

- Cupa României runner-up: 2025–26
