= João Figueiredo (footballer) =

Brazilian footballer (born 1996)

Personal information
- Full name: João Vitor Brandão Figueiredo
- Date of birth: 27 May 1996 (age 30)
- Place of birth: São Paulo, Brazil
- Height: 1.80 m (5 ft 11 in)
- Position: Forward

Team information
- Current team: Johor Darul Ta'zim
- Number: 25

Youth career
- Atlético Mineiro

Senior career*
Years	Team	Apps	(Gls)
2016–2017	Atlético Mineiro	3	(0)
2017	→ Democrata (loan)	6	(0)
2018–2019	Kauno Žalgiris	39	(14)
2019–2020	OFI	34	(11)
2020–2022	Al-Wasl	23	(10)
2021–2022	→ Gaziantep (loan)	34	(8)
2022–2023	Gaziantep	22	(7)
2023–2025	İstanbul Başakşehir	80	(18)
2025–	Johor Darul Ta'zim	10	(7)

International career^{‡}
2025	Malaysia	3	(3)
- * Club domestic league appearances and goals as of 27 February 2026 ‡ National team caps and goals as of 8 September 2025

João Vitor Brandão Figueiredo (born 27 May 1996) is a Brazilian professional footballer who currently plays as a forward for Malaysia Super League club Johor Darul Ta'zim. He represented Malaysia at international level three times; however, he was given a year-long suspension from all football related activities after being sanctioned by FIFA in September 2025 for forging documents related to eligibility for Malaysia.

== Club career ==
=== OFI ===
On 2 August 2019, Super League club OFI officially announced the acquisition of Figueiredo on a three-year deal for a fee of €100,000.

On 4 July 2020, he scored in a 2–2 home draw against PAOK. He scored in the last game of the season, a 3–2 away defeat, against Panathinaikos, on 19 July 2020.

=== Al Wasl ===
Figueiredo, on 21 September 2020, completed his transfer in Al Wasl, signing a three-year contract with the Dubai-based team, in a €1 million deal.

=== Gaziantep ===
On 6 June 2022, Figueiredo moved to Gaziantep on a permanent basis after playing there on loan previously and signed a three-year contract.

=== İstanbul Başakşehir ===
On 17 February 2023, following Gaziantep's withdrawal from the 2022–23 season on account of the 2023 Turkey-Syria earthquake, Figueiredo signed for İstanbul Başakşehir on a three-and-a-half-year deal. He made his debut for the club against Alanyaspor on 3 March 2023.

=== Johor Darul T’azim ===
On 6 July 2025, Malaysian club Johor Darul Ta’zim announced the signing of Figueiredo.

== International career ==
Figueiredo received his first call-up to the Malaysia national team for the 2027 AFC Asian Cup qualification match against Vietnam. He made his international debut on 10 June 2025 at the Bukit Jalil National Stadium, scoring the opening goal in Malaysia's 4–0 win, with his goal coming in the 48th minute following a run into the penalty area, with the shot deflecting off a defender before looping over the goalkeeper and into the net. Prior to his international debut for Malaysia, Figueiredo had previously been invited to join a senior Brazil national team training camp in 2018. Although he did not feature in any official matches, the experience allowed him to train alongside several established players, including Gabriel Jesus.

In September 2025, Football Association of Malaysia (FAM), Figueiredo, and six players were sanctioned by FIFA due to falsification and forgery of documents regarding the seven players' eligibility to play for Malaysia in the third round of the 2027 AFC Asian Cup qualifiers against Vietnam. Each players were fined CHF 2,000 (around MYR 10,560) and were suspended from all football related activities for 12 months. FAM has confirmed it will file an appeal against FIFA's ruling.

== Personal life ==
FIFA recently launched an investigation through its Disciplinary Committee where it was found that Figueiredo's grandmother was born in Abre Campo, Brazil, not Johor, Malaysia, which meant Figueiredo had illegally played for Malaysia as he had no Malaysian ancestry.

== Career statistics ==
=== Club ===
As of match played 31 May 2025

Appearances and goals by club, season and competition
Club	Season	League			Cup (Note: Includes Lithuanian Cup, Greek Cup, UAE League Cup, Turkish Cup)		Continental		Total	
Club	Season	Division	Apps	Goals	Apps	Goals	Apps	Goals	Apps	Goals
Kauno Žalgiris	2018	A Lyga	22	4	1	0	0	0	23	4
Kauno Žalgiris	2019	A Lyga	17	10	1	0	2 (Note: Appearance(s) in UEFA Europa League)	0	20	10
Kauno Žalgiris	Total		39	14	2	0	2	0	43	14
OFI Crete	2019–20	Super League Greece	33	11	3	1	0	0	34	12
OFI Crete	2019–20	Super League Greece	1	0	0	0	1	0	2	0
OFI Crete	Total		34	11	3	1	1	0	38	2
Al Wasl	2020–21	UAE Pro League	23	10	6	2	0	0	29	12
Gaziantep	2021–22	Süper Lig	34	8	4	2	0	0	38	10
Gaziantep	2022–23	Süper Lig	22	7	4	2	0	0	26	9
Gaziantep	Total		56	15	8	4	0	0	64	19
Başakşehir	2022–23	Süper Lig	12	3	4	1	0	0	16	4
Başakşehir	2023–24	Süper Lig	34	8	4	0	0	0	38	8
Başakşehir	2024–25	Süper Lig	34	7	3	3	11 (Note: Appearances in UEFA Conference League)	2	48	12
Başakşehir	Total		80	18	11	4	11	2	102	24
Career total			232	68	30	11	14	2	276	81

=== International ===
As of match played 8 September 2025

Appearances and goals by national team and year
National team	Year	Apps	Goals
Malaysia	2025	3	3
Total		3	3

Scores and results list Malaysia's goal tally first, score column indicates score after each Figueiredo goal.

List of international goals scored by João Figueiredo
No.	Date	Venue	Opponent	Score	Result	Competition
1	10 June 2025	Bukit Jalil National Stadium, Bukit Jalil, Malaysia	Vietnam	1–0	4–0	2027 AFC Asian Cup qualification
2	4 September 2025	Bukit Jalil National Stadium, Bukit Jalil, Malaysia	Singapore	2–0	2–1	Friendly
3	8 September 2025	Sultan Ibrahim Stadium, Johor, Malaysia	Palestine	1–0	1–0	Friendly

== Honours ==
Johor Darul Ta'zim

- Malaysia Charity Shield: 2025
