= Günay Güvenç =

Turkish footballer

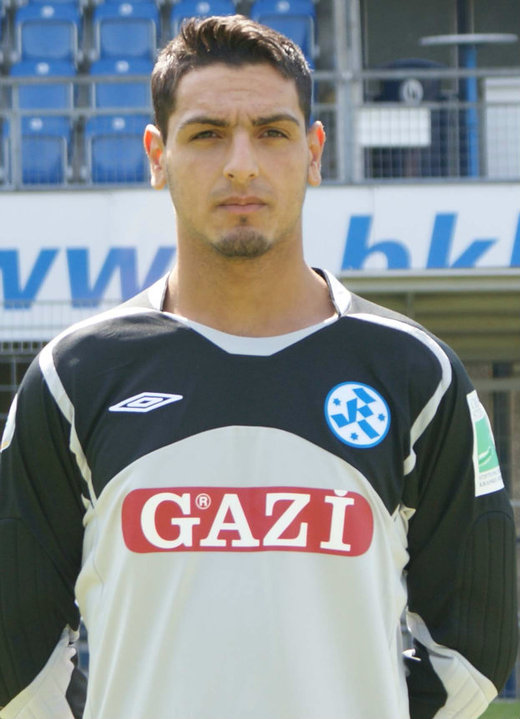
- Güvenç with Stuttgarter Kickers in 2013

Personal information
- Full name: Günay Güvenç
- Date of birth: 25 June 1991 (age 35)
- Place of birth: Neu-Ulm, Germany
- Height: 1.87 m (6 ft 2 in)
- Position: Goalkeeper

Team information
- Current team: Galatasaray
- Number: 19

Youth career
- 1997–2009: SSV Ulm 1846
- 2009–2010: Stuttgarter Kickers

Senior career*
Years	Team	Apps	(Gls)
2010–2013	Stuttgarter Kickers II	40	(0)
2010–2013	Stuttgarter Kickers	27	(0)
2013–2016	Beşiktaş	12	(0)
2014	→ Adanaspor (loan)	15	(0)
2014	→ Mersin İdmanyurdu (loan)	0	(0)
2016–2018	Göztepe	42	(0)
2018–2023	Gaziantep	160	(0)
2023	→ Kasımpaşa (loan)	8	(0)
2023–	Galatasaray	14	(0)

International career^{‡}
2013–2014	Turkey A2	4	(0)
- * Club domestic league appearances and goals as of 10 June 2026 ‡ National team caps and goals as of 24 August 2015

Günay Güvenç (born 25 June 1991) is a German-Turkish professional footballer who plays as a goalkeeper for Galatasaray.

== Career ==
=== Galatasaray ===
On 1 August 2023, he signed a 3-year contract with Galatasaray.

== Career statistics ==
As of match played 30 May 2025

Appearances and goals by club, season and competition
Club	Season	League			Turkish Cup		Europe		Other		Total	
Club	Season	Division	Apps	Goals	Apps	Goals	Apps	Goals	Apps	Goals	Apps	Goals
Stuttgarter Kickers	2010–11	Regionalliga Süd	4	0	—		—		—		4	0
Stuttgarter Kickers	2011–12	Regionalliga Süd	12	0	—		—		—		12	0
Stuttgarter Kickers	2012–13	3. Liga	11	0	—		—		—		11	0
Stuttgarter Kickers	Total		27	0	—		—		—		27	0
Beşiktaş	2013–14	Süper Lig	0	0	0	0	0	0	—		0	0
Beşiktaş	2014–15	Süper Lig	10	0	1	0	—		—		11	0
Beşiktaş	2015–16	Süper Lig	2	0	5	0	0	0	—		7	0
Beşiktaş	Total		12	0	6	0	0	0	—		18	0
Adanaspor (loan)	2013–14	TFF 1. Lig	15	0	—		—		—		15	0
Mersin İdmanyurdu (loan)	2014–15	Süper Lig	0	0	—		—		—		0	0
Göztepe	2016–17	TFF 1. Lig	34	0	0	0	—		3 (Note: Appearances in TFF 1. Lig promotion play-offs)	0	37	0
Göztepe	2017–18	Süper Lig	5	0	1	0	—		—		6	0
Göztepe	Total		39	0	1	0	—		3	0	43	0
Gaziantep	2018–19	TFF 1. Lig	31	0	0	0	—		3	0	34	0
Gaziantep	2019–20	Süper Lig	31	0	0	0	—		—		31	0
Gaziantep	2020–21	Süper Lig	38	0	0	0	—		—		38	0
Gaziantep	2021–22	Süper Lig	35	0	2	0	—		—		37	0
Gaziantep	2022–23	Süper Lig	22	0	1	0	—		—		23	0
Gaziantep	Total		157	0	3	0	—		3	0	163	0
Kasımpaşa (loan)	2022–23	Süper Lig	8	0	—		—		—		8	0
Galatasaray	2023–24	Süper Lig	2	0	3	0	0	0	0	0	5	0
Galatasaray	2024–25	Süper Lig	3	0	6	0	6 (Note: Two appearances in UEFA Champions League, four appearances in UEFA Europa League)	0	0	0	15	0
Galatasaray	2025–26	Süper Lig	0	0	0	0	0	0	0	0	0	0
Galatasaray	Total		5	0	9	0	6	0	0	0	20	0
Career total			263	0	19	0	6	0	6	0	294	0

== Honours ==
Beşiktaş

- Süper Lig: 2015–16

Galatasaray

- Süper Lig: 2023–24, 2024–25, 2025–26
- Turkish Cup: 2024–25
- Turkish Super Cup: 2023
