= Mustafa Eskihellaç =

Turkish footballer (born 1997)

Personal information
- Full name: Mustafa Eskihellaç
- Date of birth: 5 May 1997 (age 29)
- Place of birth: Trabzon, Turkey
- Height: 1.75 m (5 ft 9 in)
- Positions: Left-back; left winger

Team information
- Current team: Trabzonspor
- Number: 19

Youth career
- 2007–2009: Çağlayanspor
- 2009–2015: Düzyurtspor

Senior career*
Years	Team	Apps	(Gls)
2015–2018	Düzyurtspor	58	(11)
2018–2022	Yeni Malatyaspor	63	(4)
2019	→ Elazığspor (loan)	13	(4)
2019–2020	→ Boluspor (loan)	28	(2)
2022–2025	Gaziantep	65	(3)
2023	→ Kasımpaşa (loan)	5	(0)
2025–	Trabzonspor	43	(0)

International career^{‡}
2018	Turkey U20	4	(0)
2025–	Turkey	3	(0)
- * Club domestic league appearances and goals as of 10 June 2026 ‡ National team caps and goals as of 18 November 2025

Mustafa Eskihellaç (born 5 May 1997) is a Turkish professional footballer who plays as a left-back or left winger for Süper Lig club Trabzonspor and the Turkey national team.

== Professional career ==
On 18 January 2018, Mustafa signed for Yeni Malatyaspor from Düzyurtspor after successful seasons in the TFF Third League. He made his professional debut with Malatyaspor in a 1-1 Süper Lig tie with Kasımpaşa S.K. on 9 February 2018.

On the last day of the January transfer market 2019, Eskihellaç was one of 22 players in two hours who signed for Turkish club Elazığspor. It had been placed under a transfer embargo but managed to negotiate it with the Turkish FA, leading to them going on a mad spree of signing and registering a load of players despite not even having a permanent manager in place. In just two hours, they managed to snap up a record 22 players - 12 coming in on permanent contracts and a further 10 joining on loan deals until the end of the season. He arrived on a loan for the rest of the season.

On 23 July 2022, Eskihellaç signed a three-year contract with Gaziantep.

On February 8, 2025, he signed a three-and-a-half-year contract with Trabzonspor.

== International career ==
Mustafa represented the Turkey U20 at the 2018 Toulon Tournament.

He made his senior Turkey national team debut on 7 June 2025 in a friendly game against United States national team

== Honours ==
Trabzonspor

- Turkish Cup: 2025–26
