= Alexandru Maxim =

Romanian footballer (born 1990)

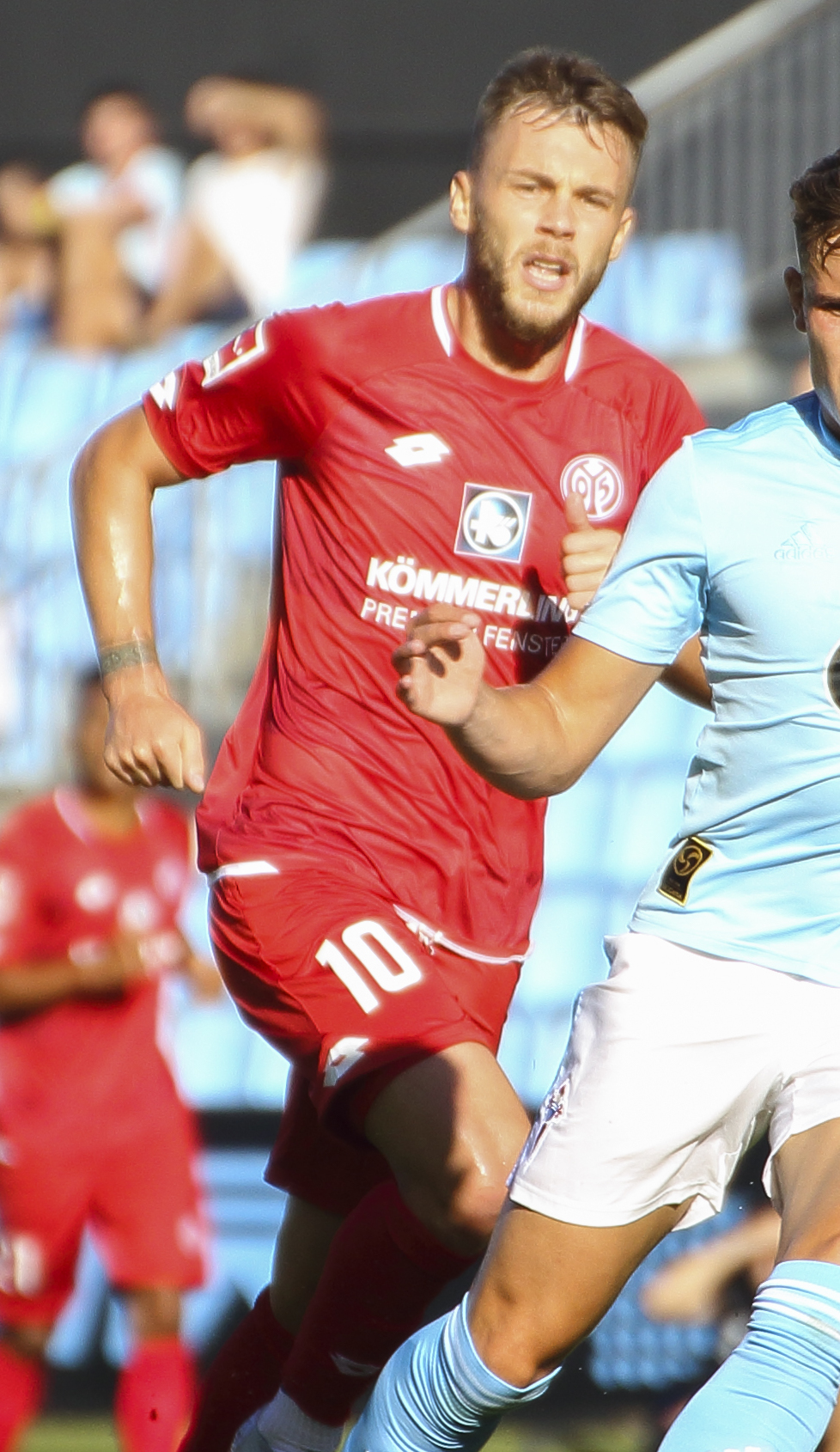
- Maxim with Mainz 05 in 2018

Personal information
- Full name: Alexandru Iulian Maxim
- Date of birth: 8 July 1990 (age 36)
- Place of birth: Piatra Neamț, Romania
- Height: 1.79 m (5 ft 10 in)
- Position: Attacking midfielder

Team information
- Current team: Gaziantep
- Number: 44

Youth career
- 1997–2004: Olimpia Piatra Neamț
- 2004–2007: Ardealul Cluj
- 2007–2009: Espanyol

Senior career*
| Years | Team | Apps | (Gls) |
| 2009–2010 | Espanyol B | 26 | (0) |
| 2010–2011 | Espanyol | 0 | (0) |
| 2010–2011 | → Badalona (loan) | 5 | (0) |
| 2011–2013 | Pandurii Târgu Jiu | 44 | (9) |
| 2013–2017 | VfB Stuttgart | 116 | (16) |
| 2017–2020 | Mainz 05 | 49 | (3) |
| 2020 | → Gaziantep (loan) | 15 | (7) |
| 2020– | Gaziantep | 198 | (48) |
| 2023 | → Beşiktaş (loan) | 11 | (0) |

International career^{‡}
| 2011–2012 | Romania U21 | 3 | (0) |
| 2012–2022 | Romania | 55 (Note: Maxim previously earned a cap and a goal for Romania in a match against Belgium, which was later deemed unofficial. He also played a game for Romania B in 2013, hence the statistical inacurracies.) | (6) |
- * Club domestic league appearances and goals as of 12 October 2026 ‡ National team caps and goals as of 14 June 2022

Alexandru Iulian Maxim (Romanian pronunciation: [alekˈsandru makˈsim]; born 8 July 1990) is a Romanian professional footballer who plays as an attacking midfielder for Süper Lig club Gaziantep, which he captains.

Maxim recorded his professional debut for the reserve team of Espanyol in 2009, and also had a loan spell at Badalona before returning to Romania with Pandurii Târgu Jiu in 2011. His display prompted a move to Germany at the start of 2013, where he amassed Bundesliga totals of 140 games and 14 goals representing VfB Stuttgart and Mainz 05. After seven years in the latter country, Maxim joined Turkish side Gaziantep in 2020, initially on loan.

At international level, Maxim made his debut for the Romania senior team in a 1–0 friendly win over Switzerland in May 2012, and has since been capped over 50 times.

== Club career ==
=== Early career and Espanyol ===
Maxim started his football career with local side Olimpia Piatra Neamț when he was seven years old before joining Ardealul Cluj in 2004, sharing teams at some point with Mihai Răduț and Vlad Chiricheș.

Aged 17, Maxim moved to Spain with Espanyol. About his accommodation in the country, he said that "it was not very easy". After progressing through the club's academy, he then played for the reserves in the Segunda División B. During the 2010–11 campaign, Maxim was loaned to Badalona.

=== Pandurii Târgu Jiu ===
On 9 August 2011, Maxim returned to Romania to sign a one-year contract with the option of another two years for Pandurii Târgu Jiu.

Maxim made his debut in the Liga I on 12 September 2011, coming on as a late substitute in a 5–1 win over Mioveni, and scored his first goal for the club on 18 December in a 1–1 draw with Ceahlăul Piatra Neamț. He netted his second on 31 March 2012, in a 1–1 draw against Steaua București. Maxim later scored two more goals against Oțelul Galați and Concordia Chiajna respectively. Despite being absent on some occasions, Maxim finished his first season at the club with four goals in 28 appearances all competitions comprised.

The following campaign, Maxim aided Pandurii to a perfect start after scoring one each against Ceahlăul Piatra Neamț and Oțelul Galați, with the team having managed six wins in the first seven matches. By the time the first half of the season came to an end, he had played 20 games and scored three more goals.

Maxim's good display attracted interest from several foreign clubs, including Standard Liège, and Steaua București was close to reaching an agreement for his transfer. In response to the initial rumours, head coach Petre Grigoraș stated that he expects the player to stay at Pandurii until the summer of the next year.

=== VfB Stuttgart ===
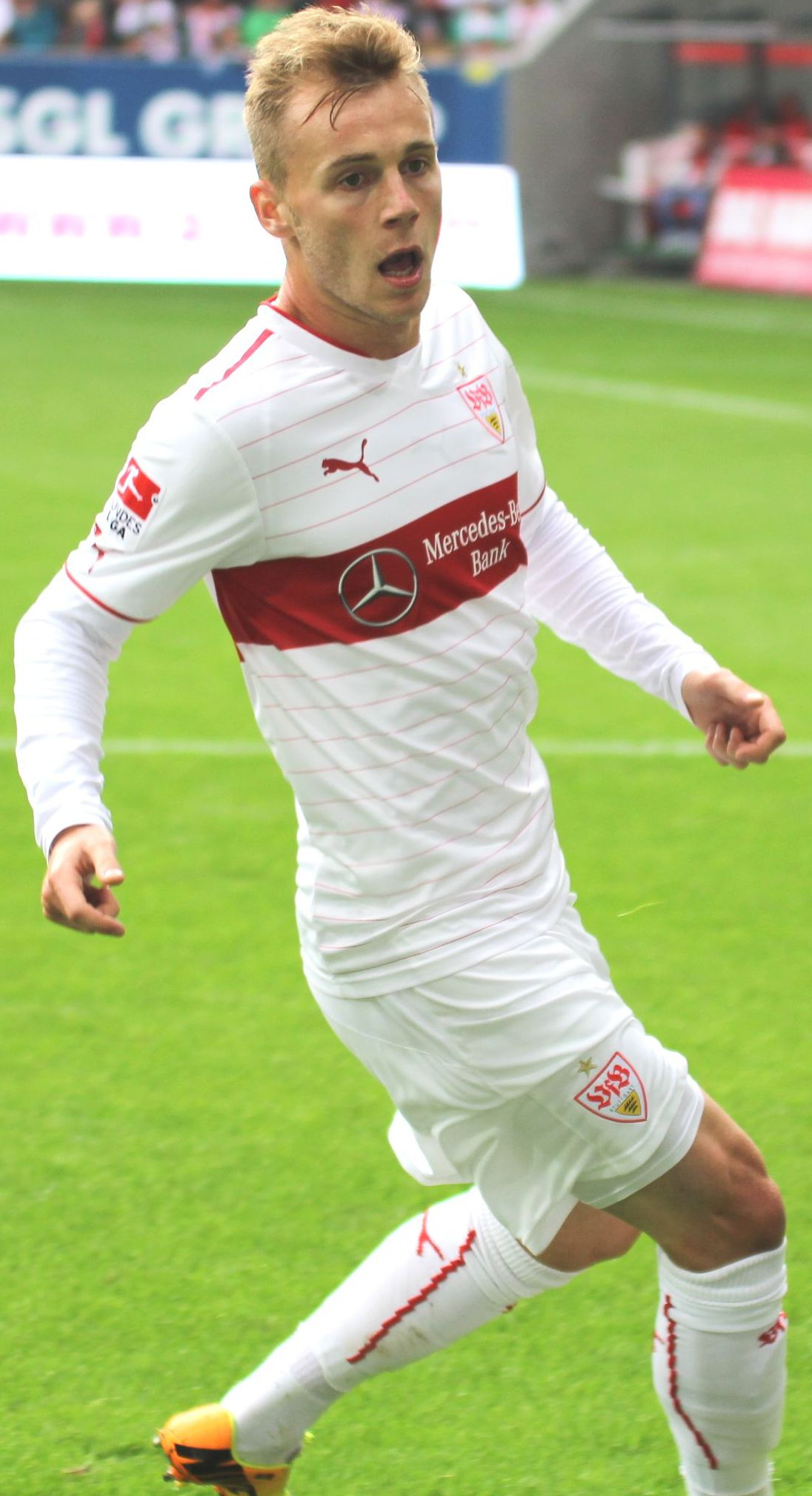
Maxim playing for VfB Stuttgart in a match against FC Augsburg, on 28 August 2013

On 31 January 2013, Maxim joined German side VfB Stuttgart for a transfer fee of €1.5 million, signing a four-and-a-half-year contract.

Maxim made his debut for Stuttgart on 14 February 2013, in a UEFA Europa League round of 32 game against Genk. On 23 February, he played his first Bundesliga match against Nürnberg. On 30 March, Maxim scored his first goal against defending champions Borussia Dortmund, to equalise in an eventual 2–1 loss due to Robert Lewandowski's late goal. Despite suffering an injury, Maxim made fourteen appearances in all competitions and played 62 minutes before being substituted in the final of the 2012–13 DFB-Pokal, which saw Stuttgart lose 3–2 to Bayern Munich.

On 1 September 2013, Maxim scored his first double for the club while also offering two assists in the 6–2 thrashing of Hoffenheim, to give Stuttgart the first Bundesliga win of the season after four match-days. He continued with his good form by scoring an assist in the next Bundesliga match against Hertha BSC in their 1–0 away victory. Maxim then scored again on 29 September 2013, in a 4–0 win over Eintracht Braunschweig and scored two weeks later on 20 October 2013, in a 3–3 draw against Hamburger SV. Coincidentally, Maxim scored twice against them for the second time this season on 8 March 2014 and two weeks later on 22 March 2014. He scored 9 goals in 26 matches in the 2013–14 Bundesliga, also contributing 11 assists.

In the 2014–15 season, Maxim started the season well when he scored the club's first goal of the season, in a 1–1 draw against Borussia Mönchengladbach. However, Maxim suffered an injury that kept him out for a week and after making his return, where he came on as a substitute in the second half, in a 3–3 draw against Bayer Leverkusen, Maxim played the role in the next game, where he set up two goals, in a 5–4 win over Eintracht Frankfurt on 25 October 2014 and then in the second time meeting on 21 March 2015, he scored and set up one of the goals, in a 3–1 win. Despite suffering from another injury, Maxim made twenty–six appearances and scored two times, as well as, assisting six times in the 2014–15 season.

Ahead of the 2015–16 season, it was announced on 11 August 2015 that Maxim extended his contract with VfB Stuttgart until June 2019. The following month on 23 September 2015, Maxim scored his first goal of the season, in a 3–1 win over Hannover 96 and then scored his second goal of the season on 28 October 2015, in the second round of DFB-Pokal, in a 2–0 win over Carl Zeiss Jena. After suffering from an illness that kept him out for a week, Maxim set up two goals on 2 May 2016, in a 6–2 loss against Werder Bremen. While the club was relegated to the 2. Bundesliga, Maxim scored once in 25 league appearances and assisting six times in the 2015–16 season.

Following the club's relegation to 2. Bundesliga, Maxim was given a number 10 shirt from the previous 44 shirt and started the 2016–17 season well when he scored in the opening game of the season, with a 2–1 win over St. Pauli. On 30 October 2016, he scored again, in a 3–1 win over Karlsruher SC. After suffering from an injury for one game, Maxim then made his return from injury on 12 December 2016, where he came on as a substitute in the second half, in a 2–2 draw against Hannover 96. He finished strongly appearing as a regular starter and contributing three goals and one assist in the last matches of the season which helped secure Stuttgart's promotion to the Bundesliga.

In his four and a half years at the club, Maxim amassed 131 appearances with 17 goals and 35 assists across all competitions.

=== Mainz 05 ===
In June 2017, Maxim joined Mainz 05 on a four-year deal. The transfer fee paid to Stuttgart was in the region of €3 million plus bonuses. He made his competitive debut in a cup match against Lüneburger SK Hansa on 12 August, offering an assist in the 3–1 away win.

On 14 October 2017, Maxim scored his first goal for Mainz in a 3–2 league victory over Hamburger SV.

== International career ==
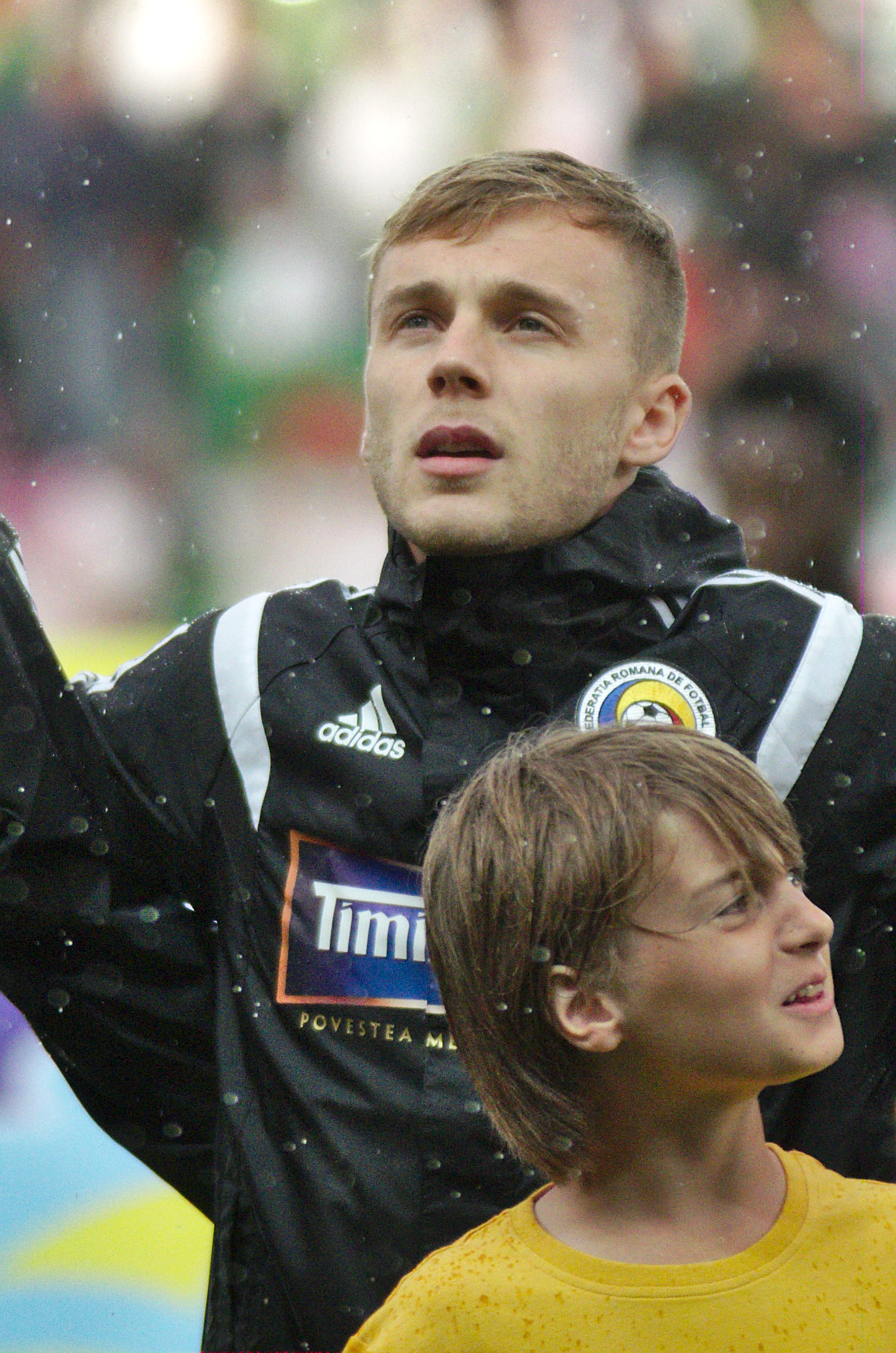
Maxim lining up for Romania in June 2014

Maxim has stated that he wishes to represent his native country internationally, despite the possibility of taking up Spanish citizenship.

Maxim was called up by Romania U21 for the first time on 2 October 2011 and made his debut on 11 October 2011, in a 2–0 loss against France. His second appearance for the under-21 side came on 10 November 2011 also against France, which saw them lost 3–0.

Maxim made his full international debut for the Romania on 30 May 2012, in a friendly game against Switzerland. On 11 September 2012, he became the very first Romanian player born after the Romanian Revolution to score for the national team, after a 4–0 win over Andorra. Two months later on 14 November 2012, Maxim scored again in a 2–1 victory against Belgium, but the match was later deemed unofficial according to the Laws of the Game (excessive number of substitutions).

It was not until 11 October 2015 when he scored his first goal in three years, in a 3–0 win over Faroe Islands. The following year, Maxim was included for the Romania squad for the UEFA Euro 2016. However, he was omitted from the squad after the final cut. In response to this, Maxim expressed his bitterness but nevertheless wished the team success in the tournament.

On 1 September 2017, Maxim netted the winner against Armenia at his first game under manager Christoph Daum.

== Personal life ==
In addition to his native Romanian, Maxim can speak English, Spanish and German. He regarded Zinedine Zidane and compatriot Gheorghe Hagi as his role models growing up.

== Career statistics ==
=== Club ===
As of match played on 12 October 2026

Appearances and goals by club, season and competition
| Club | Season | League | | | National cup (Note: Includes Cupa României, DFB-Pokal, Turkish Cup) | | Continental | | Other | | Total | |
| Club | Season | Division | Apps | Goals | Apps | Goals | Apps | Goals | Apps | Goals | Apps | Goals |
|---|---|---|---|---|---|---|---|---|---|---|---|---|
| Espanyol B | 2009–10 | Segunda División B | 26 | 0 | — | | — | | 2 (Note: Appearances in Segunda División B relegation play-outs) | 0 | 28 | 0 |
| Badalona (loan) | 2010–11 | Segunda División B | 5 | 0 | 0 | 0 | — | | — | | 5 | 0 |
| Pandurii Târgu Jiu | 2011–12 | Liga I | 25 | 4 | 3 | 0 | — | | — | | 28 | 4 |
| Pandurii Târgu Jiu | 2012–13 | Liga I | 19 | 5 | 1 | 0 | — | | — | | 20 | 5 |
| Pandurii Târgu Jiu | Total | | 44 | 9 | 4 | 0 | — | | — | | 48 | 9 |
| VfB Stuttgart | 2012–13 | Bundesliga | 11 | 1 | 2 | 0 | 3 (Note: Appearances in UEFA Europa League) | 0 | — | | 16 | 1 |
| VfB Stuttgart | 2013–14 | Bundesliga | 29 | 7 | 2 | 0 | 3 | 0 | — | | 34 | 7 |
| VfB Stuttgart | 2014–15 | Bundesliga | 26 | 2 | 1 | 0 | — | | — | | 27 | 2 |
| VfB Stuttgart | 2015–16 | Bundesliga | 25 | 1 | 2 | 1 | — | | — | | 27 | 2 |
| VfB Stuttgart | 2016–17 | 2. Bundesliga | 25 | 5 | 2 | 0 | — | | — | | 27 | 5 |
| VfB Stuttgart | Total | | 116 | 16 | 9 | 1 | 6 | 0 | — | | 131 | 17 |
| Mainz 05 | 2017–18 | Bundesliga | 22 | 2 | 4 | 0 | — | | — | | 26 | 2 |
| Mainz 05 | 2018–19 | Bundesliga | 22 | 1 | 2 | 2 | — | | — | | 24 | 3 |
| Mainz 05 | 2019–20 | Bundesliga | 5 | 0 | 1 | 0 | — | | — | | 6 | 0 |
| Mainz 05 | Total | | 49 | 3 | 7 | 2 | — | | — | | 56 | 5 |
| Gaziantep (loan) | 2019–20 | Süper Lig | 15 | 7 | 0 | 0 | — | | — | | 15 | 7 |
| Gaziantep | 2020–21 | Süper Lig | 38 | 15 | 3 | 1 | — | | — | | 41 | 16 |
| Gaziantep | 2021–22 | Süper Lig | 31 | 14 | 3 | 1 | — | | — | | 34 | 15 |
| Gaziantep | 2022–23 | Süper Lig | 21 | 4 | 4 | 1 | — | | — | | 25 | 5 |
| Gaziantep | 2023–24 | Süper Lig | 34 | 3 | 4 | 0 | — | | — | | 38 | 3 |
| Gaziantep | 2024–25 | Süper Lig | 34 | 7 | 3 | 0 | — | | — | | 37 | 7 |
| Gaziantep | 2025–26 | Süper Lig | 33 | 5 | 4 | 0 | — | | — | | 37 | 5 |
| Gaziantep | 2026–27 | Süper Lig | 7 | 0 | 0 | 0 | — | | — | | 7 | 0 |
| Gaziantep | Total | | 213 | 55 | 21 | 3 | — | | — | | 234 | 58 |
| Beşiktaş (loan) | 2022–23 | Süper Lig | 11 | 0 | — | | — | | — | | 11 | 0 |
| Career total | | | 464 | 83 | 41 | 6 | 6 | 0 | 2 | 0 | 513 | 89 |

=== International ===
As of match played 14 June 2022

Appearances and goals by national team and year
| National team | Year | Apps | Goals |
|---|---|---|---|
| Romania | 2012 | 3 | 1 |
| Romania | 2013 | 9 | 0 |
| Romania | 2014 | 7 | 0 |
| Romania | 2015 | 6 | 1 |
| Romania | 2016 | 2 | 0 |
| Romania | 2017 | 2 | 1 |
| Romania | 2018 | 5 | 1 |
| Romania | 2019 | 3 | 0 |
| Romania | 2020 | 7 | 2 |
| Romania | 2021 | 7 | 0 |
| Romania | 2022 | 4 | 0 |
| Total | | 55 | 6 |

Scores and results list Romania's goal tally first, score column indicates score after each Maxim goal.

List of international goals scored by Alexandru Maxim
| No. | Date | Venue | Cap | Opponent | Score | Result | Competition |
|---|---|---|---|---|---|---|---|
| 1 | 11 September 2012 | Arena Națională, Bucharest, Romania | 3 | Andorra | 4–0 | 4–0 | 2014 FIFA World Cup qualification |
| 2 | 11 October 2015 | Tórsvøllur, Tórshavn, Faroe Islands | 24 | Faroe Islands | 3–0 | 3–0 | UEFA Euro 2016 qualifying |
| 3 | 1 September 2017 | Arena Națională, Bucharest, Romania | 28 | Armenia | 1–0 | 1–0 | 2018 FIFA World Cup qualification |
| 4 | 11 October 2018 | LFF Stadium, Vilnius, Lithuania | 31 | Lithuania | 2–1 | 2–1 | 2018–19 UEFA Nations League C |
| 5 | 7 September 2020 | Wörthersee Stadion, Klagenfurt, Austria | 40 | Austria | 3–1 | 3–2 | 2020–21 UEFA Nations League B |
| 6 | 8 October 2020 | Laugardalsvöllur, Reykjavík, Iceland | 41 | Iceland | 1–2 | 1–2 | UEFA Euro 2020 qualifying play-offs |

== Honours ==
VfB Stuttgart

- 2. Bundesliga: 2016–17
- DFB-Pokal runner-up: 2012–13

Individual

- Gazeta Sporturilor Romanian Footballer of the Year runner-up: 2013; fifth place: 2020;
- Süper Lig Team of the Season: 2021–22
