= Mustafa Burak Bozan =

Turkish footballer

Personal information
- Date of birth: 23 August 2000 (age 26)
- Place of birth: Mardin, Turkey
- Height: 1.90 m (6 ft 3 in)
- Position: Goalkeeper

Team information
- Current team: Amedspor
- Number: 27

Youth career
- 2012–2018: Gaziantep

Senior career*
Years	Team	Apps	(Gls)
2018–2026	Gaziantep	37	(0)
2023	→ Tuzlaspor (loan)	3	(0)
2026–	Amedspor	0	(0)

International career^{‡}
2018	Turkey U18	1	(0)
- * Club domestic league appearances and goals as of 10 October 2026 ‡ National team caps and goals as of 05:58, 11 December 2024 (UTC)

Mustafa Burak Bozan (born 23 August 2000) is a Turkish professional footballer who plays as a goalkeeper for Süper Lig club Amedspor.

== Career ==
Bozan is a youth product of Gaziantep, and signed his first professional contract with the club in February 2018. He made his first senior debut with Gaziantep in a 3–0 Turkish Cup win over Turgutluspor on 31 October 2019. He made his professional debut with Gaziantep in a 1–0 Süper Lig win over Hatayspor on 15 May 2021.

== International career ==
Bozan represented the Turkey U18s once in a friendly 2–1 loss to the Russia U18 on 23 February 2018.

== Career statistics ==
As of match played 31 May 2026

Appearances and goals by club, season and competition
Club	Season	League			National cup		Other		Total	
Club	Season	Division	Apps	Goals	Apps	Goals	Apps	Goals	Apps	Goals
Gaziantep	2017–18	TFF 1. Lig	0	0	—		0	0	0	0
Gaziantep	2018–19	TFF 1. Lig	0	0	0	0	0	0	0	0
Gaziantep	2019–20	Süper Lig	0	0	1	0	—		1	0
Gaziantep	2020–21	Süper Lig	1	0	0	0	—		1	0
Gaziantep	2021–22	Süper Lig	4	0	2	0	—		6	0
Gaziantep	2022–23	Süper Lig	0	0	3	0	—		3	0
Gaziantep	2023–24	Süper Lig	0	0	0	0	—		0	0
Gaziantep	2024–25	Süper Lig	18	0	4	0	—		22	0
Gaziantep	2025–26	Süper Lig	14	0	4	0	—		18	0
Gaziantep	Total		37	0	14	0	0	0	51	0
Tuzlaspor (loan)	2022–23	TFF 1. Lig	3	0	—		—		3	0
Amedspor	2026–27	Süper Lig	0	0	0	0	—		0	0
Career total			40	0	14	0	0	0	54	0
