= Berke Gürbüz =

Turkish footballer

Personal information
- Full name: Berke Gürbüz
- Date of birth: 27 January 2003 (age 23)
- Place of birth: Gölbaşı, Turkey
- Height: 1.72 m (5 ft 8 in)
- Position: Forward

Team information
- Current team: 23 Elazığ

Youth career
- 2013–2019: Ankaragücü

Senior career*
Years	Team	Apps	(Gls)
2019–2021	Ankaragücü	2	(0)
2021–	Gaziantep	1	(0)
2022	→ Sloboda Tuzla (loan)	0	(0)
2022–2023	→ Etimesgut Belediyespor (loan)	2	(0)
2023–2024	→ Hacettepe 1945 SK (loan)	6	(0)
2024–	→ 23 Elazığ (loan)	8	(0)

International career^{‡}
2018	Turkey U15	1	(0)
2022	Turkey U19	1	(0)
- * Club domestic league appearances and goals as of 3 November 2024 ‡ National team caps and goals as of 24 February 2022

Berke Gürbüz (born 27 January 2003) is a Turkish footballer who plays as a forward for TFF Third League club 23 Elazığ on loan from Gaziantep.

== Professional career ==
Gürbüz made his debut with Ankaragücü in a 5–0 Süper Lig loss to Alanyaspor on 30 November 2019. On 23 August 2021, he transferred to Gaziantep, signing a 5-year contract.
