= Mehmet Erdem Uğurlu =

Turkish footballer

Personal information
- Date of birth: 9 July 1988 (age 38)
- Place of birth: Kırıkkale, Turkey
- Height: 1.77 m (5 ft 10 in)
- Position: Midfielder

Team information
- Current team: Gaziantep
- Number: 23

Youth career
- 2002–2004: Gazi Üniversitesispor
- 2004–2007: Keçiörengücü

Senior career*
Years	Team	Apps	(Gls)
2007–2010	Keçiörengücü	61	(13)
2007	→ Osmanlıspor (loan)	0	(0)
2010–2014	BAKspor	104	(18)
2014–2015	Ankaragücü	33	(9)
2015–2017	Göztepe	51	(4)
2017	→ Gaziantep (loan)	14	(1)
2017–2021	Gaziantep	56	(2)
2021	Altay	14	(1)
2021–2022	Bursaspor	15	(2)
2022–	Iğdır	5	(0)
- * Club domestic league appearances and goals as of 15 October 2022

Mehmet Erdem Uğurlu (born 9 July 1988) is a Turkish professional footballer who plays as a midfielder for Iğdır.

== Professional career ==
On 19 June 2019, signed his first professional contract with Gaziantep as they were promoted into the Süper Lig. Uğurlu made his professional debut in a 4-1 Süper Lig loss to Trabzonspor on 19 October 2019.
