= Ulaş Zengin =

Turkish footballer

Personal information
- Date of birth: 25 June 1997 (age 29)
- Place of birth: Bornova, Turkey
- Height: 1.80 m (5 ft 11 in)
- Position: Centre-back

Team information
- Current team: İskenderunspor
- Number: 5

Youth career
- 2007–2014: Altay

Senior career*
Years	Team	Apps	(Gls)
2014–2019	Altay	61	(1)
2019–2024	Gaziantep	3	(0)
2022	→ Adanaspor (loan)	8	(0)
2022–2023	→ Karacabey Belediyespor (loan)	23	(0)
2024–	İskenderunspor	7	(0)
- * Club domestic league appearances and goals as of 3 November 2024

Ulaş Zengin (born 25 June 1997) is a Turkish professional footballer who plays as a centre-back for Turkish club İskenderunspor.

== Career ==
Zengin is a product of Altay's youth academy since 2007. He joined their senior team and signed his first professional contract in 2014. On 22 May 2019, he transferred to Gaziantep. He made his professional debut with Gaziantep in a 5–4 Süper Lig loss to Çaykur Rizespor on 11 May 2021.
