= Ertuğrul Ersoy =

Turkish footballer (born 1997)

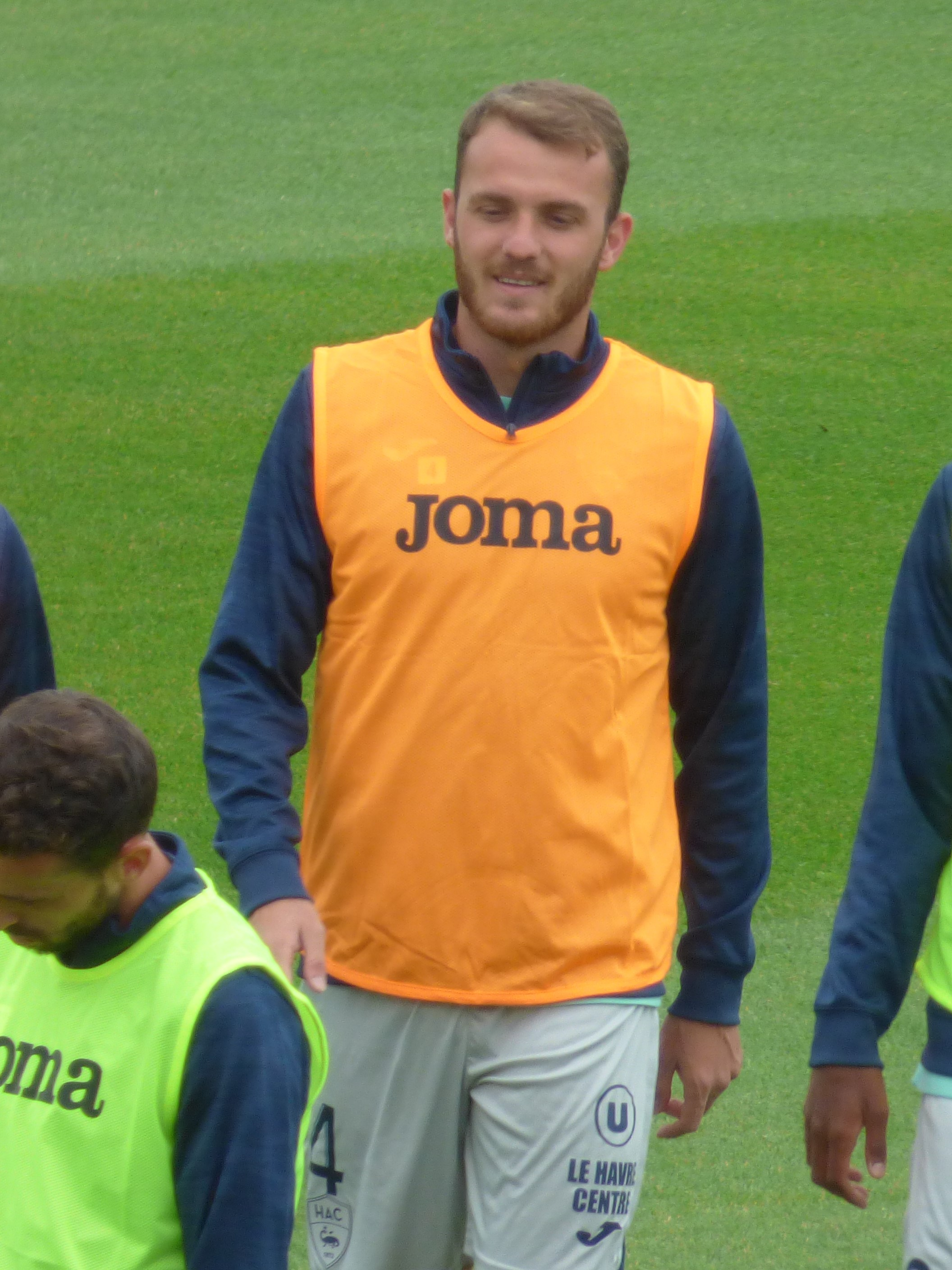

Personal information
- Date of birth: 13 February 1997 (age 29)
- Place of birth: Gölcük, Turkey
- Height: 1.87 m (6 ft 2 in)
- Position: Defender

Team information
- Current team: Bursaspor
- Number: 4

Youth career
- 2008–2010: Gölcükspor
- 2010–2013: Bursaspor

Senior career*
Years	Team	Apps	(Gls)
2013–2019	Bursaspor	77	(4)
2014	→ Yeşil Bursa SK (loan)	8	(0)
2015–2016	→ Çaykur Rizespor (loan)	11	(0)
2019–2022	Le Havre	34	(0)
2021–2022	→ Gaziantep (loan)	29	(0)
2022–2025	Gaziantep	52	(4)
2023	→ Ístanbulspor (loan)	5	(0)
2025–	Bursaspor	14	(4)

International career^{‡}
2012–2013	Turkey U16	23	(5)
2012–2014	Turkey U17	18	(3)
2014	Turkey U18	3	(0)
2013–2016	Turkey U19	13	(0)
2016–2017	Turkey U21	8	(0)
2018–	Turkey	2	(0)
- * Club domestic league appearances and goals as of 6 December 2025 ‡ National team caps and goals as of 20 November 2018

Ertuğrul Ersoy (born 13 February 1997) is a Turkish professional footballer who plays as a defender for TFF 1. Lig club Bursaspor and the Turkey national team.

== Club career ==
Ersoy made his Süper Lig debut for Bursaspor on 1 November 2014. On 26 August 2019, he joined Le Havre. In January 2021, he joined Gaziantep on loan until 2022. On 8 February 2022, Le Havre and Gaziantep agreed on a permanent transfer.

== International career ==
Ersoy made his debut for Turkey on 11 October 2018 in a friendly against Bosnia and Herzegovina.
