= Furkan Soyalp =

Turkish footballer

Personal information
- Date of birth: 12 June 1995 (age 31)
- Place of birth: Yenimahalle, Turkey
- Height: 1.84 m (6 ft 0 in)
- Position: Central midfielder

Team information
- Current team: Amedspor
- Number: 8

Youth career
- 2007–2010: Ankaraspor
- 2010–2011: Bursa Merinosspor
- 2011–2013: Bursaspor

Senior career*
Years	Team	Apps	(Gls)
2012–2019	Bursaspor	7	(0)
2015	→ Bandırmaspor (loan)	14	(2)
2016	→ Bandırmaspor (loan)	10	(0)
2019–2020	İstanbul Başakşehir	1	(0)
2019–2020	→ Gaziantep (loan)	15	(1)
2020–2025	Gaziantep	116	(8)
2023	→ Adana Demirspor (loan)	5	(0)
2025–2026	Kayserispor	28	(1)
2026–	Amedspor	6	(1)

International career
2011	Turkey U16	3	(0)
2011–2012	Turkey U17	6	(0)
2012	Turkey U18	2	(0)
- * Club domestic league appearances and goals as of 10 October 2026

Furkan Soyalp (born 12 June 1995) is a Turkish professional footballer who plays as a central midfielder for Süper Lig club Amedspor. He made his Süper Lig debut on 19 May 2013 against Gençlerbirliği.
