= Papy Djilobodji =

Senegalese footballer

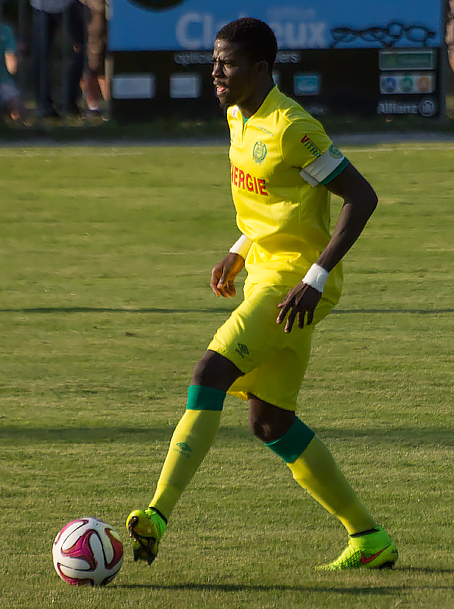
- Djilobodji playing for Nantes in 2014

Personal information
- Full name: El Hadji Papy Mison Djilobodji
- Date of birth: 1 December 1988 (age 37)
- Place of birth: Kaolack, Senegal
- Height: 1.93 m (6 ft 4 in)
- Position: Centre-back

Team information
- Current team: Sarıyer
- Number: 3

Senior career*
Years	Team	Apps	(Gls)
2007–2009	ASC Saloum		
2009–2010	Sénart-Moissy	10	(1)
2010–2015	Nantes	171	(9)
2015–2016	Chelsea	0	(0)
2016	→ Werder Bremen (loan)	14	(2)
2016–2018	Sunderland	18	(0)
2017–2018	→ Dijon (loan)	30	(0)
2019	Guingamp	4	(0)
2019–2024	Gaziantep	153	(17)
2023	→ Kasımpaşa (loan)	10	(1)
2024–2025	Fatih Karagümrük	36	(2)
2025–	Sarıyer	19	(1)

International career^{‡}
2013–2018	Senegal	17	(0)
- * Club domestic league appearances and goals as of 8 February 2026 ‡ National team caps and goals as of 27 March 2018

El Hadji Papy Mison Djilobodji (born 1 December 1988) is a Senegalese professional footballer who plays for Turkish TFF 1. Lig club Sarıyer and the Senegal national team. He is capable of playing at centre back and defensive midfield.

After beginning his career in his homeland with ASC Saloum, he moved to France in 2009 to play for amateur team Sénart-Moissy, where his performances quickly earned him a transfer to Nantes. He played regularly over five and a half seasons for them, the final two in Ligue 1.

In 2015, he signed for Chelsea, making a sole substitute appearance in the League Cup and being loaned to Bundesliga team Werder Bremen before signing for Sunderland for £8 million at the end of the season. After Sunderland were relegated in his first season there, he was loaned to Dijon in 2017, and sacked in September 2018 for breach of contract for returning to the club over a month late and in an unfit condition. He then signed for Guingamp in 2019.

Djilobodji made his international debut for Senegal in 2013. He was part of their squad at the 2015 Africa Cup of Nations.

== Club career ==
=== Early years ===
Born in Kaolack, Djilobodji began his career with hometown team ASC Saloum, making his senior debut in the 2007–08 season. After two successful seasons in the Senegal Premier League, he transferred to French club Sénart-Moissy in October 2009. He played a good first half of the 2009–10 season in the Championnat de France amateur 2, which led to him being bought by Nantes on 27 December 2009.

=== Nantes ===
On 14 May 2010, Djilobodji made his debut for Nantes in a 3–1 Ligue 2 defeat against eventual champions Caen. He was regular in his second year, playing 27 games and scoring twice, ending with a record of 186 appearances and 9 goals. In the Summer transfer window of 2015, it was reported that he had caught the attention of many English Premier League clubs such as Sunderland and Aston Villa, neither of whom made bids for him.

=== Chelsea ===
On 1 September 2015, Djilobodji signed for Premier League champions Chelsea on a four-year contract, for a fee reported to be in the region of £2.7 million to £4 million. The following day, he was not included in their 25-man squad for the UEFA Champions League. He made his only Blues appearance in the third round of the League Cup away to Walsall, replacing Radamel Falcao in added time at the end of a 4–1 victory.

On 21 January 2016, Djilobodji signed for Werder Bremen until the end of the 2015–16 season. Three days later, he made his debut in the Bundesliga in a 3–1 win away to Schalke and was praised for his performance. On 13 February, Djilobodji scored his first Werder Bremen goal in a 1–1 draw against TSG Hoffenheim, netting a 13th-minute equalizer.

In March, he received a retrospective two-match ban for making a throat-slitting gesture at Mainz 05's Pablo de Blasis. In the final game of the season, Djilobodji scored a late winner against Eintracht Frankfurt, saving his team from relegation and confining the opponents to the relegation play-off.

=== Sunderland ===
On 5 August 2016, Djilobodji signed for Sunderland on a four-year deal for a fee reported to be in the region of £8 million. He made his Premier League debut 16 days later in a 2–1 home loss to Middlesbrough, and the Sunderland Echo mentioned his performance as a "rare positive" in the defeat. On 19 November, he was sent off in the last minute of a 3–0 win over Hull City at the Stadium of Light. He was charged with violent conduct by The FA in January 2017 after catching West Bromwich Albion's Darren Fletcher in the face in a 2–0 loss, and subsequently received a four-match ban. He totalled 23 games over the season as Sunderland were relegated.

Djilobodji returned to France's top flight on 31 August 2017, signing on loan for Dijon for the whole season. He made his debut for them nine days later, playing the full 90 minutes of a 2–1 loss at Caen in which he received a yellow card.

After Sunderland's relegation to EFL League One in 2018, Djilobodji was one of several players who expressed their desire to leave the club rather than play in England's third tier. He reached a deal with the new administration of owner Stewart Donald that he could remain on unpaid leave during July in order to secure a move away from the club. The deal included a proviso that he maintain his fitness should he need to return to Sunderland. He failed to return to training in August, and Donald suggested that Djilobodji and fellow absentee Didier Ndong were "willfully devaluing themselves" in order to secure cheap moves away from the club. On 2 September 2018, Djilobodji informed Sunderland of his intention to return to training, insisting he had done nothing wrong. He failed a fitness test and more training sessions, and Donald suggested Djilobodji was guilty of "gross misconduct". On 12 September 2018, he was sacked for breaching his contract and failing a fitness test.

=== Guingamp ===
On 31 December 2018, Guingamp announced that they signed Djilobodji in a six-month deal. He made his debut on 19 January in a 9–0 loss at holders Paris Saint-Germain as a 73rd-minute substitute for Yeni Ngbakoto. Three days later he started in a Coupe de France last 32 match at Nancy, and scored the winner in extra time. On 26 January, he was sent off in a 1–0 home loss to Reims for breaking Pablo Chavarría's nose with a kick, and was handed a six-match ban.

=== Gaziantep ===
On 22 July 2019, Djilobodji joined Turkish club Gaziantep.

== International career ==
Djilobodji was part of the Senegal squad at the 2015 Africa Cup of Nations in Equatorial Guinea. He played two games in their elimination from Group C, being substituted at half time for Lamine Gassama in the first, a 2–1 win over eventual finalists Ghana at the Estadio de Mongomo.

== Career statistics ==
As of match played 3 June 2023

Appearances and goals by club, season and competition
Club	Season	League			National cup		League cup		Other		Total	
Club	Season	Division	Apps	Goals	Apps	Goals	Apps	Goals	Apps	Goals	Apps	Goals
Sénart-Moissy	2009–10	CFA Group D	7	1	0	0	0	0	—		7	1
Nantes	2009–10	Ligue 2	13	0	0	0	0	0	—		13	0
Nantes	2010–11	Ligue 2	27	2	3	0	1	0	—		31	2
Nantes	2011–12	Ligue 2	36	4	1	0	3	0	—		40	4
Nantes	2012–13	Ligue 2	36	0	2	0	1	0	—		39	0
Nantes	2013–14	Ligue 1	28	3	1	0	1	0	—		30	3
Nantes	2014–15	Ligue 1	31	0	1	0	1	0	—		33	0
Nantes	Total		171	9	8	0	7	0	0	0	186	9
Chelsea	2015–16	Premier League	0	0	0	0	1	0	—		1	0
Werder Bremen (loan)	2015–16	Bundesliga	14	2	2	0	—		—		16	2
Sunderland	2016–17	Premier League	18	0	2	0	3	0	—		21	0
Sunderland	2017–18	Championship	0	0	0	0	1	0	—		1	0
Sunderland	Total		18	0	2	0	4	0	0	0	22	0
Dijon (loan)	2017–18	Ligue 1	30	0	1	1	0	0	—		31	1
Guingamp	2018–19	Ligue 1	4	0	1	0	0	0	—		5	0
Gaziantep	2019–20	Süper Lig	33	6	3	0	—		—		36	6
Gaziantep	2020–21	Süper Lig	36	2	2	0	—		—		38	2
Gaziantep	2021–22	Süper Lig	31	5	2	1	—		—		33	6
Gaziantep	2022–23	Süper Lig	19	1	2	0	—		—		21	1
Gaziantep	Total		119	14	9	1	0	0	0	0	128	15
Kasımpaşa(loan)	2022–23	Süper Lig	10	1	0	0	—		—		10	1
Career total			373	27	23	2	12	0	0	0	406	29
