= Gaziantep Stadium =

Stadium in Gaziantep, Turkey

Gaziantep Stadyumu
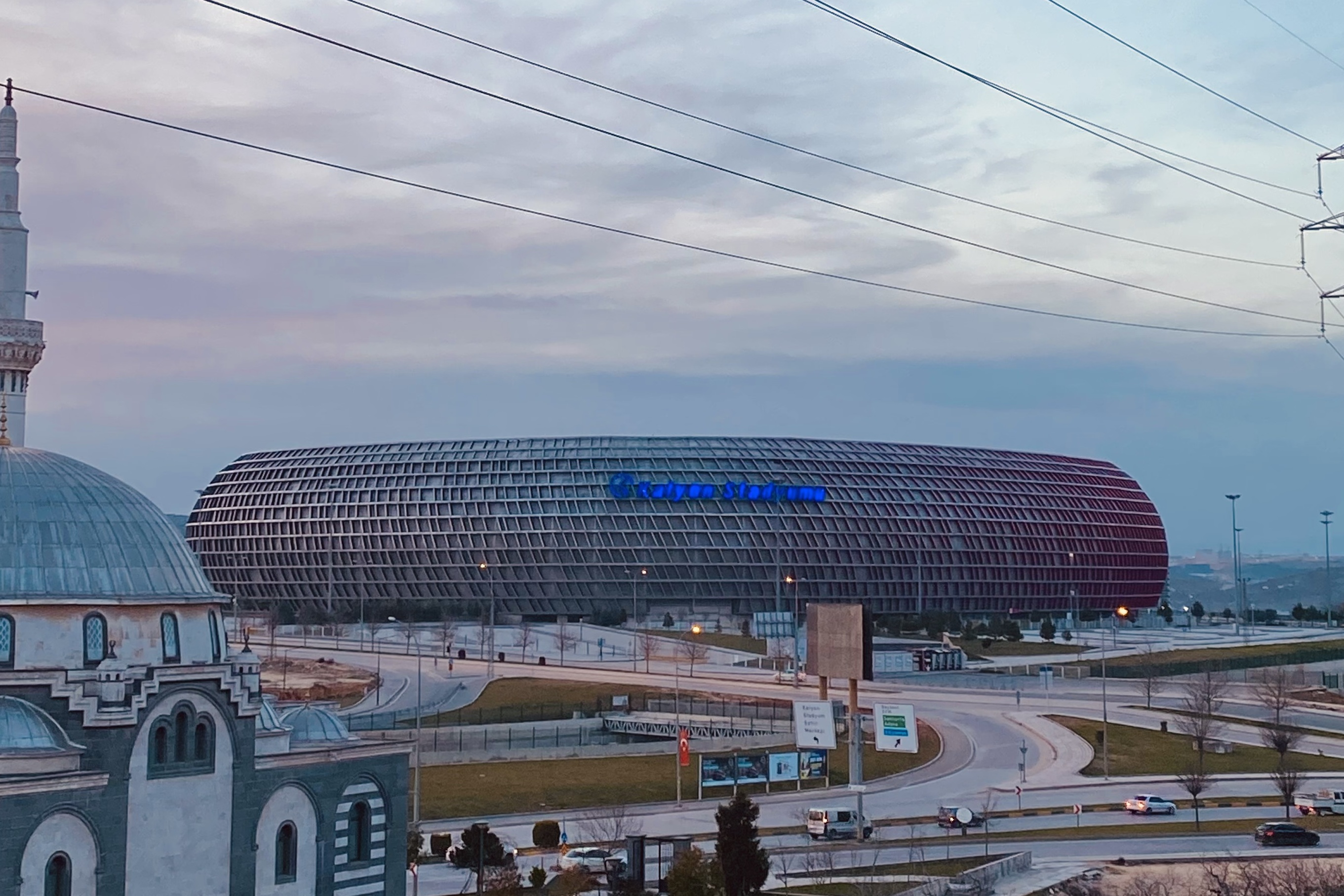

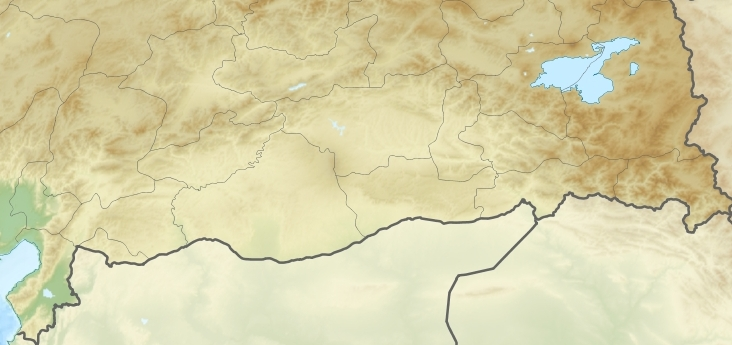
- Location in Southeastern Turkey Location in Turkey
- Full name: Gaziantep Stadyumu
- Former names: Gaziantep Arena (2017); Kalyon Stadium (2017–2024)
- Location: Şehitkamil, Gaziantep, Turkey
- Coordinates: 37°7′26″N 37°22′57″E
- Capacity: 30,320
- Executive suites: 54
- Surface: Hybrid grass
- Record attendance: 29,017 (Türkiye–Czech Republic, 19 November 2022)

Construction
- Groundbreaking: 24 August 2013
- Built: 2013–2017
- Opened: 15 January 2017

Tenants
- Gaziantep F.K. Turkey national football team (selected matches)

The Gaziantep Stadium is a stadium in Gaziantep, Turkey. It has a capacity of 30,320 spectators. and was opened on 15 January 2017. It is the home ground of Gaziantep F.K., replacing Gaziantep Kamil Ocak Stadium. Its distance to the city centre is 10 kilometers. For it to reflect the tradition of the ancient city of Zeugma, the outside walls of the stadium are covered with mosaic.

== Matches ==
=== Turkish National Team ===
Gaziantep Stadium is one of the home stadiums of the Turkish national Football team.

Date	Time (TRT)	Team #1	Res.	Team #2	Round	Attendance
19 November 2022	20:00	Turkey	2–1	Czech Republic	Friendly	29,017
