= 2022–23 Alanyaspor season =

Alanyaspor
2022–23 season
- President: Hasan Çavuşoğlu
- Head coach: Francesco Farioli (until 27 February 2023); Ersun Yanal (from 27 February 2023 to 19 April 2023); Ömer Erdoğan (from 22 April 2023)
- Stadium: Kırbıyık Holding Stadium
- Süper Lig: 15th
- Turkish Cup: Round of 16
- Top goalscorer: League: Ahmed Hassan (10 goals); All: Ahmed Hassan (11 goals)
Home colours	Away colours	Third colours

The 2022–23 season was the 75th season in the existence of Alanyaspor and the club's seventh consecutive season in the top flight of Turkish football. In addition to the domestic league, Alanyaspor participated in this season's edition of the Turkish Cup. The season covers the period from 1 July 2022 to 30 June 2023.

== Players ==
=== First-team squad ===
As of 8 September 2022

Note: Flags indicate national team as defined under FIFA eligibility rules; some limited exceptions apply. Players may hold more than one non-FIFA nationality.

No.	Pos.	Nation	Player
3	DF	(Turkey) TUR	Ahmet Gülay (on loan from Beşiktaş)
4	MF	(Turkey) TUR	Furkan Bayır
6	MF	(Turkey) TUR	Umut Güneş
7	MF	(Turkey) TUR	Efecan Karaca
8	MF	(Netherlands) NED	Leroy Fer
9	FW	(Turkey) TUR	Erencan Yardımcı
10	MF	(Algeria) ALG	Zinedine Ferhat
11	MF	(Germany) GER	Efkan Bekiroğlu
13	GK	(Iceland) ISL	Rúnar Alex Rúnarsson (on loan from Arsenal)
14	FW	(Senegal) SEN	Famara Diédhiou
16	DF	(Turkey) TUR	Kerem Hayta
17	FW	(Angola) ANG	Wilson Eduardo
18	MF	(Morocco) MAR	Oussama Targhalline (on loan from Marseille)
20	DF	(Turkey) TUR	Fatih Aksoy
21	MF	(Portugal) POR	Daniel Candeias

No.	Pos.	Nation	Player
22	MF	(Turkey) TUR	Cem Çelik
27	DF	(Portugal) POR	Pedro Pereira (on loan from Monza)
28	GK	(Portugal) POR	José Marafona
29	DF	(Slovenia) SVN	Jure Balkovec
34	MF	(Turkey) TUR	İsmail Zehir
37	MF	(Germany) GER	Mert-Yusuf Torlak
42	DF	(Turkey) TUR	Yunus Bahadir
63	MF	(Turkey) TUR	Bedirhan Kahraman
70	MF	(Turkey) TUR	Oğuz Aydın
88	MF	(Turkey) TUR	Yusuf Özdemir
97	MF	(Democratic Republic of the Congo) COD	Arnaud Lusamba
98	MF	(Ivory Coast) CIV	Idrissa Doumbia (on loan from Sporting)
99	GK	(Turkey) TUR	Yusuf Karagöz
—	DF	(Senegal) SEN	Joher Rassoul
—	FW	(Portugal) POR	Ivan Cavaleiro (on loan from Fulham)

=== Out on loan ===
Note: Flags indicate national team as defined under FIFA eligibility rules; some limited exceptions apply. Players may hold more than one non-FIFA nationality.

No.	Pos.	Nation	Player
—	GK	(Turkey) TUR	İsmail Ünal (at Kestelspor)
—	DF	(Turkey) TUR	Emre Bekir (at Serik Belediyespor)
—	DF	(Turkey) TUR	Sıddık Çelik (at Malatya Yesilyurt Belediyespor)

No.	Pos.	Nation	Player
—	FW	(Turkey) TUR	Emircan Altıntaş (at Çaykur Rizespor)
—	FW	(Turkey) TUR	Veysel Ünal (at Afjet Afyonspor)
—	MF	(Turkey) TUR	Tayfur Bingöl (at Beşiktaş)

== Pre-season and friendlies ==
Win Draw Loss Fixtures

20 July 2022 Friendly	Kayserispor (Turkey)	2–1	(Turkey) Alanyaspor	Kayseri
18:00 TRT (UTC+3)	Gavranović 30'; Bertolacci 42'	Report	Hosseini 55' (o.g.)	Stadium: Kadir Has Tesisleri

23 July 2022 Friendly	Alanyaspor (Turkey)	3–3	(Turkey) MKE Ankaragücü	Kayseri
12:00 TRT (UTC+3)				Stadium: Erciyes Yüksek İrtifa Kamp Merkezi

7 December 2022 Friendly	Alanyaspor (Turkey)	2–4	(Turkey) Fenerbahçe	Alanya
19:00 TRT (UTC+3)	Bekiroğlu 78'; Candeias 90+1'		Kahveci 28'; Dursun (penalty missed) 36', 41', 51'; Lincoln 47'	Stadium: Kırbıyık Holding Stadium

15 December 2022 Friendly	Alanyaspor (Turkey)	3–1	(Italy) Salernitana	Alanya
16:00 TRT (UTC+3)	Mahgoub 29'; Karaca 48'; Doumbia 90+1'		Bonazzoli 9'	Stadium: Kırbıyık Holding Stadium

== Competitions ==
=== Overall record ===
Competition	First match	Last match	Starting round	Final position	Record							
Competition	First match	Last match	Starting round	Final position	Pld	W	D	L	GF	GA	GD	Win %
Süper Lig	7 August 2022	3 June 2023	Matchday 1	15th	36	11	8	17	54	70	−16	30.56
Turkish Cup	8 November 2022	17 January 2023	Fourth round	Round of 16	3	2	0	1	7	4	+3	66.67
Total					39	13	8	18	61	74	−13	33.33

Source: Competitions

=== Süper Lig ===
==== League table ====
Pos	Team	Pld	W	D	L	GF	GA	GD	Pts	Qualification or relegation
13	Antalyaspor	36	11	8	17	46	55	−9	41 (Note: Head-to-head points: İstanbulspor 11, Antalyaspor 10, Sivasspor 8, Alanyaspor 4.)	
14	Sivasspor	36	11	8	17	46	54	−8	41	
15	Alanyaspor	36	11	8	17	54	70	−16	41	
16	Giresunspor (R)	36	10	10	16	42	60	−18	40	Relegation to TFF First League
17	Ümraniyespor (R)	36	7	9	20	47	64	−17	30	Relegation to TFF First League

Source: Süper Lig
Rules for classification: 1) Points; 2) Head-to-head points; 3) Head-to-head goal difference; 4) Head-to-head goals scored; 5) Goal difference; 6) Goals scored; 7) Play-off.
(R) Relegated

==== Results summary ====
Overall								Home						Away					
Pld	W	D	L	GF	GA	GD	Pts	W	D	L	GF	GA	GD	W	D	L	GF	GA	GD
36	11	8	17	54	70	−16	41	8	4	6	29	27	+2	3	4	11	25	43	−18

Source: Spor Toto Süper Lig

==== Results by round ====
Round	1	2	3	4	5	6	7	8	9	10	11	12	13	14	15	16	17	18	19	20	21	22	23	24	25	26	27	28	29	30	31	32	33	34	35	36	37	38
Ground	A	H	A	H	A	H	A	H	A	H	A	H	A	H	A	H	A	H		H	A	H	A	H	A	H	A	H	A	H	A	H	A	H	A	H	A	
Result	W	D	D	L	L	W	L	D	L	W	D	W	L	D	D	W	L	W	B	D	L	L	L	W	L	L	D	W	L	L	W	W	L	L	W	L	L	B
Position	2	5	11	12	13	10	11	11	11	11	10	9	10	10	9	9	9	8	9	9	9	10	11	10	11	11	12	10	11	13	11	10	10	10	10	11	13	15

Source: Spor Toto Süper Lig
A = Away; H = Home; B = Bye; W = Win; D = Draw; L = Loss

==== Matches ====
The league schedule was released on 4 July.

7 August 2022 1	Fatih Karagümrük	2–4	Alanyaspor	Istanbul
19:15 TRT (UTC+3)	Shukurov (yellow card) 36'; Borini (yellow card) 54' (goal) 56'; Biraschi 72'	Report	Bayır (yellow card) 15'; Eduardo 19', 70'; Bekiroğlu 28'; Candeias (yellow card) 45+3'; Bingöl (yellow card) 76'; Yardımcı 90+3'	Stadium: Atatürk Olympic Stadium; Attendance: 421; Referee: Zorbay Küçük

14 August 2022 2	Alanyaspor	3–3	Beşiktaş	Antalya
21:45 TRT (UTC+3)	Fer (yellow card) 26'; Aksoy (yellow card) 41'; Bekiroğlu 45+3'; Candeias (yellow card) 64' (goal) 90+2' (pen.); Romain Saïss 81' (o.g.)	Report	N'Koudou (yellow card) 1' (goal) 3'; Uzunhan (yellow card) 15' (yellow card) 37' (red card); Weghorst (yellow card) 19'; Uçan 20'; Ghezzal 31' (pen.)	Stadium: Kırbıyık Holding Stadium; Attendance: 6,049; Referee: Yasin Kol

22 August 2022 3	Sivasspor	1–1	Alanyaspor	Sivas
19:15 TRT (UTC+3)	Gradel 45' (pen.); Charisis (yellow card) 72'; Çiftçi (yellow card) 84'	Report	Bayır (yellow card) 81'; Doumbia 90+1'; Eduardo (yellow card) 90+4'	Stadium: New Sivas 4 Eylül Stadium; Attendance: 3,716; Referee: Ümit Öztürk

27 August 2022 4	Alanyaspor	0–1	İstanbulspor	Antalya
21:45 TRT (UTC+3)	Fer (yellow card) 47'; Candeias (yellow card) 67' (penalty missed) 87'; Bayır (yellow card) 79'	Report	Ethemi 48' (yellow card) 76'; Yılmaz (yellow card) 71'; Abazaj (yellow card) 86' (yellow card) 87' (red card)	Stadium: Kırbıyık Holding Stadium; Attendance: 2,505; Referee: Mustafa Kürşad Filiz

3 September 2022 5	İstanbul Başakşehir	2–0	Alanyaspor	Istanbul
19:15 TRT (UTC+3)	Gürler 23'; Okaka (yellow card) 72'; Kény 85'	Report	Güneş (yellow card) 45+1'; Fer (yellow card) 65'; Pereira (yellow card) 90+3'	Stadium: Fatih Terim Stadium; Attendance: 2,073; Referee: Ali Şansalan

9 September 2022 6	Alanyaspor	2–1	Ankaragücü	Antalya
20:00 TRT (UTC+3)	Doumbia (yellow card) 49'; Karaca (yellow card) 53'; Hassan 65'; Bekiroğlu 87'	Report	Güreler 69'	Stadium: Kırbıyık Holding Stadium; Attendance: 3,598; Referee: Mert Güzenge

18 September 2022 7	Fenerbahçe	5–0	Alanyaspor	Istanbul
20:00 TRT (UTC+3)	Rossi 5'; Gustavo Henrique 17'; João Pedro (penalty missed) 45+3'; Crespo 45+4'; Valencia 70'; Kahveci 76'	Report	Bekiroğlu (yellow card) 31'; Balkovec (yellow card) 71'	Stadium: Şükrü Saracoğlu Stadium; Attendance: 39,595; Referee: Hüseyin Göçek

2 October 2022 8	Alanyaspor	1–1	Giresunspor	Antalya
14:30 TRT (UTC+3)	Targhalline (yellow card) 21'; Güneş (yellow card) 29'; Fer (yellow card) 72'; Aksoy (yellow card) 79'; Balkovec 81'	Report	Serginho (red card) 4'; Arias (yellow card) 27'; Sağlam 65' (pen.); Pérez (yellow card) 79'	Stadium: Kırbıyık Holding Stadium; Attendance: 2,775; Referee: Tugay Kaan Numanoğlu

9 October 2022 9	Hatayspor	1–0	Alanyaspor	Hatay
17:00 TRT (UTC+3)	Mehdi Boudjemaa (yellow card) 41'; Burak Öksüz 72'; Kamil Ahmet Çörekçi (yellow card) 88'	Report	Karaca (yellow card) 81'; Balkovec (yellow card) 82'	Stadium: New Hatay Stadium; Attendance: 7,373; Referee: Abdulkadir Bitigen

14 October 2022 10	Alanyaspor	3–2	Antalyaspor	Antalya
20:00 TRT (UTC+3)	Karaca (yellow card) 25'; Hassan 44'; Lusamba 51'; Doumbia 70' (yellow card) 79'	Report	Ghacha (yellow card) 29'; Wright 57', 87'; Özmert (yellow card) 79'	Stadium: Kırbıyık Holding Stadium; Attendance: 4,336; Referee: Yaşar Kemal Uğurlu

23 October 2022 11	Galatasaray	2–2	Alanyaspor	Istanbul
20:00 TRT (UTC+3)	Mertens 11'; Icardi 21'; Boey (red card) 32'; Muslera (yellow card) 32'; Rashica (yellow card) 45+3'; Kutlu (yellow card) 90+2'; Bardakcı (red card) 90+4'	Report	Candeias (yellow card) 18'; Özdemir (yellow card) 30'; Balkovec 68'; Aydın (yellow card) 72'; Hassan 90+1'	Stadium: Nef Stadium; Attendance: 44,236; Referee: Ali Palabıyık

29 October 2022 12	Alanyaspor	2–0	Gaziantep	Antalya
20:00 TRT (UTC+3)	Fer 21' (yellow card) 44'; Doumbia (yellow card) 22'; Balkovec 53'	Report	Toșca (yellow card) 73'	Stadium: Kırbıyık Holding Stadium; Attendance: 2,749; Referee: Arda Kardeşler

4 November 2022 13	Ümraniyespor	3–1	Alanyaspor	Istanbul
20:00 TRT (UTC+3)	Nayir 21', 69'; Geraldo 38'; Atasayar (yellow card) 50'	Report	Fer (yellow card) 7'; Bayır (yellow card) 42'; Eduardo 56'	Stadium: Ümraniye Municipality City Stadium; Attendance: 1,527; Referee: Ali Şansalan

11 November 2022 14	Alanyaspor	0–0	Adana Demirspor	Antalya
20:00 TRT (UTC+3)	Fer (yellow card) 53'; Güneş (yellow card) 75'; Karaca (yellow card) 89'; Aksoy (yellow card) 90+1'	Report	Belhanda (red card) 44'; Rodrigues (yellow card) 44'	Stadium: Kırbıyık Holding Stadium; Attendance: 4,331; Referee: Çağdaş Altay

25 December 2022 15	Konyaspor	2–2	Alanyaspor	Konya
16:00 TRT (UTC+3)	Hadžiahmetović 22' (pen.), 90+11' (pen.); Calvo (yellow card) 75'; Ikpeazu (yellow card) 90+2'; Demirbağ (yellow card) 90+11'	Report	Hassan (yellow card) 43' (goal) 78' (pen.); Bayır 65'; Balkovec (yellow card) 90+11'; Cavaleiro (yellow card) 90+13'	Stadium: Konya Metropolitan Municipality Stadium; Attendance: 8,293; Referee: Bahattin Şimşek

28 December 2022 16	Alanyaspor	3–1	Kayserispor	Antalya
17:00 TRT (UTC+3)	Hassan 21'; Özdemir (yellow card) 32' (goal) 36'; Cavaleiro (yellow card) 45+3'; Karaca 72' (pen.); Rúnarsson (yellow card) 80'	Report	Mensah (yellow card) 29'; Karimi 59' (yellow card) 90+8'; Carole (yellow card) 61'; Cardoso (yellow card) 78'	Stadium: Kırbıyık Holding Stadium; Attendance: 1,581; Referee: Tugay Kaan Numanoğlu

4 January 2023 17	Kasımpaşa	4–1	Alanyaspor	Istanbul
17:00 TRT (UTC+3)	Ouanes 11' (yellow card) 25'; Fall 32', 83'; Eysseric 67'; Bahoken (yellow card) 80'	Report	Hassan 90+1'	Stadium: Recep Tayyip Erdoğan Stadium; Attendance: 727; Referee: Yasin Kol

9 January 2023 18	Alanyaspor	5–0	Trabzonspor	Antalya
20:00 TRT (UTC+3)	Karaca 14'; Hassan 36', 45+7'; Eduardo 75' (yellow card) 86'; Özdemir 78'	Report	Hugo (yellow card) 36'; Bakasetas (yellow card) 69'; Elmalı (yellow card) 86'	Stadium: Kırbıyık Holding Stadium; Attendance: 4,281; Referee: Mustafa Kürşad Filiz

19	Bye

22 January 2023 20	Alanyaspor	2–2	Fatih Karagümrük	Antalya
16:00 TRT (UTC+3)	Güneş 6'; Cavaleiro 83'; Balkovec (yellow card) 90+5'	Report	Borini 59', 79'; Kapacak (yellow card) 90+3'	Stadium: Kırbıyık Holding Stadium; Attendance: 2,827; Referee: Burak Pakkan

27 January 2023 21	Beşiktaş	3–0	Alanyaspor	Istanbul
20:00 TRT (UTC+3)	Tosun 20' (pen.), 50'; Fer 58' (o.g.); Masuaku (yellow card) 69'	Report	Bekiroğlu (yellow card) 65'; Doumbia (yellow card) 90+2'	Stadium: Vodafone Park; Attendance: 32,923; Referee: Yaşar Kemal Uğurlu

31 January 2023 22	Alanyaspor	0–3	Sivasspor	Antalya
17:00 TRT (UTC+3)	Rassoul (yellow card) 52'; Doumbia (yellow card) 55'	Report	Yatabaré 32', 45+2'; Gradel 50'; Yalçın (yellow card) 76'; Cofie (yellow card) 90+5'	Stadium: Kırbıyık Holding Stadium; Referee: Yiğit Arslan

5 February 2023 23	İstanbulspor	2–1	Alanyaspor	Istanbul
13:30 TRT (UTC+3)	Rroca (yellow card) 28'; Ethemi 67'; Gültekin 77'	Report	Cavaleiro 71'	Stadium: Necmi Kadıoğlu Stadium; Referee: Abdulkadir Bitigen

3 March 2023 24	Alanyaspor	1–0	İstanbul Başakşehir	Antalya
20:00 TRT (UTC+3)	Bekiroğlu 54'; Fer (red card) 69'; Rúnarsson (yellow card) 90+3'	Report	Lima (yellow card) 59'; Türüç (yellow card) 74'	Stadium: Kırbıyık Holding Stadium; Referee: Zorbay Küçük

12 March 2023 25	Ankaragücü	2–0	Alanyaspor	Ankara
13:30 TRT (UTC+3)	Milson (yellow card) 8', (goal) 76'; Sowe 18'; Kılınç (yellow card) 40'	Report	Özdemir (yellow card) 1'; Hassan (yellow card) 42'	Stadium: Eryaman Stadium; Referee: Ali Şansalan

19 March 2023 26	Alanyaspor	1–3	Fenerbahçe	Antalya
19:00 TRT (UTC+3)	Koulouris 6'; Bayır (yellow card) 45+8'; Özdemir (yellow card) 90+6'	Report	Osayi-Samuel (yellow card) 19'; Valencia 65' (pen.), 85' (pen.), (yellow card) 82'; Mor 90+2'	Stadium: Kırbıyık Holding Stadium; Referee: Mete Kalkavan

2 April 2023 27	Giresunspor	2–2	Alanyaspor	Giresun
16:00 TRT (UTC+3)	Serginho (yellow card) 35'; Campuzano (yellow card) 48'; Davas 82'; Kuwas 88' (pen.)	Report	Karaca 17'; Rúnarsson (yellow card) 56'; Ferhat 73', (yellow card) 90+4'; Pereira (yellow card) 76'; Fer (yellow card) 90+2'	Stadium: Çotanak Sports Complex; Referee: Turgut Doman

28	Alanyaspor	3–0 (w/o)	Hatayspor	Hatay
		Report		Stadium: New Hatay Stadium
Note: Hatayspor withdrew from the league due to the 2023 Turkey–Syria earthquake and Alanyaspor, therefore, were awarded a 3–0 win.

14 April 2023 29	Antalyaspor	3–1	Alanyaspor	Antalya
20:30 TRT (UTC+3)	Sinik (yellow card) 15', (goal) 27'; Fernando (yellow card) 23'; Ndao 39'; Yıldırım 85'	Report	Hassan 21'; Doumbia (yellow card) 73'; Güneş (red card) 82'	Stadium: Antalya Stadium; Referee: Tugay Kaan Numanoğlu

18 April 2023 30	Alanyaspor	1–4	Galatasaray	Antalya
20:30 TRT (UTC+3)	Karaca 17' (pen.); Özdemir (yellow card) 31'; Doumbia (yellow card) 55'; Pereira (yellow card) 84'	Report	Bardakcı 14'; Icardi 42'; Mertens 48'; Rashica 63'; Yılmaz (yellow card) 90'	Stadium: Kırbıyık Holding Stadium; Referee: Abdulkadir Bitigen

31	Gaziantep	0–3 (w/o)	Alanyaspor	Gaziantep
		Report		Stadium: Gaziantep Stadium
Note: Gaziantep withdrew from the league due to the 2023 Turkey–Syria earthquake and Alanyaspor, therefore, were awarded a 3–0 win.

28 April 2023 32	Alanyaspor	1–0	Ümraniyespor	Antalya
20:00 TRT (UTC+3)	Hassan 4'	Report	Mršić (yellow card) 14'; Göksu (yellow card) 36'	Stadium: Kırbıyık Holding Stadium; Referee: Yaşar Kemal Uğurlu

6 May 2023 33	Adana Demirspor	4–2	Alanyaspor	Adana
16:00 TRT (UTC+3)	Ndiaye 18'; Belhanda 45+5', 66'; Sarı 56'; Svensson (yellow card) 63'	Report	Koulouris 11', (yellow card) 45+15'; Bayır (yellow card) 44'; Karaca 45+11' (pen.)	Stadium: New Adana Stadium; Referee: Hüseyin Göçek

16 May 2023 34	Alanyaspor	0–3	Konyaspor	Antalya
20:00 TRT (UTC+3)	Güneş (yellow card) 34'; Karagöz (yellow card) 43'; Aydın (yellow card) 83'; Lusamba (yellow card) 83'; Fer (yellow card) 90+3'	Report	Pozuelo 15', 74'; Calvo (yellow card) 24'; Dikmen 54'; Bouchalakis (yellow card) 78'	Stadium: Kırbıyık Holding Stadium; Referee: Çağdaş Altay

20 May 2023 35	Kayserispor	0–4	Alanyaspor	Kayseri
19:00 TRT (UTC+3)		Report	Yardımcı 8', 16'; Candeias (yellow card) 43'; Koulouris 65'; Rúnarsson (yellow card) 84'; Balkovec 90+2'	Stadium: Kadir Has Stadium; Referee: Yasin Kol

30 May 2023 36	Alanyaspor	1–3	Kasımpaşa	Antalya
20:00 TRT (UTC+3)	Doumbia (yellow card) 47'; Aydın 49'	Report	Eysseric (yellow card) 41'; Djilobodji 59'; Koita 65'; Fall 78'	Stadium: Kırbıyık Holding Stadium; Referee: Cihan Aydın

3 June 2023 37	Trabzonspor	5–1	Alanyaspor	Trabzon
19:00 TRT (UTC+3)	Trézéguet 18'; Hamšík 23' (pen.); Bakasetas 32'; Larsen 35'; Bozok 58'	Report	Güneş 14'; Aksoy (red card) 23'	Stadium: Şenol Güneş Sports Complex; Referee: Yaşar Kemal Uğurlu

38	Bye

=== Turkish Cup ===
8 November 2022 Fourth round	Alanyaspor	3–0	Sakaryaspor	Antalya
15:00 TRT (UTC+3)	Cavaleiro 5'; Aydın 77', 88'; Doumbia (yellow card) 86'; Diédhiou (penalty missed) 90'	Report		Stadium: Bahçeşehir Okulları Stadyumu; Referee: Direnç Tonusluoğlu

21 December 2022 Fifth round	Alanyaspor	3–2 (a.e.t.)	Eyüpspor	Antalya
17:00 TRT (UTC+3)	Ferhat 62'; Hassan (penalty missed) 54', 78' 81'; Pereira (yellow card) 88'; Doumbia 113'	Report	Demir 9'; İlter 86'; Akdağ (yellow card) 120'	Stadium: Bahçeşehir Okulları Stadyumu; Referee: Yaşar Kemal Uğurlu

17 January 2023 Round of 16	Alanyaspor	1–2	Galatasaray	Antalya
20:30 TRT (UTC+3)	Eduardo (yellow card) 43'; Cavaleiro 67'; Aksoy (yellow card) 85'	Report	Nelsson 16'; Mertens 38'; Dubois (yellow card) 85'; Kocuk (yellow card) 90+6'	Stadium: Kırbıyık Holding Stadium; Referee: Volkan Bayarslan
