= 2021–22 Alanyaspor season =

Alanyaspor
2021–22 season
- President: Hasan Çavuşoğlu
- Head coach: Çağdaş Atan (until 2 September 2021); Bülent Korkmaz (from 6 September 2021 to 29 December 2021); Francesco Farioli (from 31 December 2021)
- Stadium: Bahçeşehir Okulları Stadium
- Süper Lig: 5th
- Turkish Cup: Semi-finals
- Top goalscorer: League: Famara Diédhiou (11); All: Famara Diédhiou, Emre Akbaba (13)

The 2021–22 season was the 74th season in the history of Alanyaspor and the sixth consecutive season in the top tier of Turkish football, the Süper Lig. In addition to the domestic league, Alanyaspor participated in this season's edition of the Turkish Cup.

== Players ==
=== First-team suad ===
As of 4 February 2022

Note: Flags indicate national team as defined under FIFA eligibility rules; some limited exceptions apply. Players may hold more than one non-FIFA nationality.

| No. | Pos. | Nation | Player |
|---|---|---|---|
| 1 | GK | TUR | Serkan Kırıntılı |
| 3 | DF | TUR | Ahmet Gülay (on loan from Beşiktaş) |
| 4 | MF | NED | Leroy Fer |
| 6 | MF | TUR | Umut Güneş |
| 7 | MF | TUR | Efecan Karaca |
| 11 | MF | GER | Efkan Bekiroğlu |
| 14 | FW | SEN | Famara Diédhiou |
| 15 | DF | NGR | Chidozie Awaziem (on loan from Boavista) |
| 16 | MF | TUR | Emirhan Aydogan |
| 17 | MF | ANG | Wilson Eduardo |
| 18 | MF | POR | João Novais (on loan from Braga) |
| 19 | DF | SRB | Nemanja Milunović |
| 20 | DF | TUR | Fatih Aksoy |

| No. | Pos. | Nation | Player |
|---|---|---|---|
| 21 | MF | POR | Daniel Candeias |
| 23 | MF | TUR | Emre Akbaba (on loan from Galatasaray) |
| 24 | DF | ESP | Juanfran |
| 25 | DF | SLO | Miha Mevlja |
| 28 | GK | POR | Marafona |
| 30 | GK | TUR | Yusuf Karagöz |
| 31 | DF | COL | Cristian Borja (on loan from Braga) |
| 34 | MF | TUR | İsmail Zehir |
| 35 | DF | TUR | Furkan Bayır |
| 70 | MF | TUR | Oğuz Aydın |
| 75 | MF | TUR | Tayfur Bingöl |
| 93 | MF | MTN | El Mami Tetah |

=== Out on loan ===
Note: Flags indicate national team as defined under FIFA eligibility rules; some limited exceptions apply. Players may hold more than one non-FIFA nationality.

| No. | Pos. | Nation | Player |
|---|---|---|---|
| — | GK | TUR | İsmail Ünal (at Kestelspor) |
| — | DF | TUR | Emre Bekir (at Serik Belediyespor) |
| — | DF | TUR | Sıddık Çelik (at Malatya Yesilyurt Belediyespor) |

| No. | Pos. | Nation | Player |
|---|---|---|---|
| — | MF | TUR | Emircan Altıntaş (at BB Erzurumspor) |
| — | FW | TUR | Veysel Ünal (at Afjet Afyonspor) |

== Competitions ==
=== Overall record ===
| Competition | First match | Last match | Starting round | Final position | Record | | | | | | | |
| Competition | First match | Last match | Starting round | Final position | Pld | W | D | L | GF | GA | GD | Win % |
|---|---|---|---|---|---|---|---|---|---|---|---|---|
| Süper Lig | 15 August 2021 | 22 May 2022 | Matchday 1 | 5th | 38 | 19 | 7 | 12 | 67 | 58 | +9 | 50.00 |
| Turkish Cup | 1 December 2021 | 11 May 2022 | Fourth round | Semi-finals | 6 | 3 | 2 | 1 | 16 | 5 | +11 | 50.00 |
| Total | | | | | 44 | 22 | 9 | 13 | 83 | 63 | +20 | 50.00 |

Source: Soccerway

=== Süper Lig ===
==== League table ====
| Pos | Team | Pld | W | D | L | GF | GA | GD | Pts | Qualification or relegation |
|---|---|---|---|---|---|---|---|---|---|---|
| 3 | Konyaspor | 38 | 20 | 8 | 10 | 66 | 45 | +21 | 68 | Qualification for the Europa Conference League second qualifying round |
| 4 | Başakşehir | 38 | 19 | 8 | 11 | 56 | 36 | +20 | 65 | Qualification for the Europa Conference League second qualifying round |
| 5 | Alanyaspor | 38 | 19 | 7 | 12 | 67 | 58 | +9 | 64 | |
| 6 | Beşiktaş | 38 | 15 | 14 | 9 | 56 | 48 | +8 | 59 (Note: Beşiktaş finished ahead of Antalyaspor on head-to-head points: Antalyaspor 2–3 Beşiktaş, Beşiktaş 0–0 Antalyaspor.) | |
| 7 | Antalyaspor | 38 | 16 | 11 | 11 | 54 | 47 | +7 | 59 | |

Source: Süper Lig
Rules for classification: 1) Points; 2) Head-to-head points; 3) Head-to-head goal difference; 4) Head-to-head goals scored; 5) Goal difference; 6) Goals scored; 7) Play-off.

==== Results summary ====
| Overall | | | | | | | | Home | | | | | | Away | | | | | |
| Pld | W | D | L | GF | GA | GD | Pts | W | D | L | GF | GA | GD | W | D | L | GF | GA | GD |
|---|---|---|---|---|---|---|---|---|---|---|---|---|---|---|---|---|---|---|---|
| 38 | 19 | 7 | 12 | 67 | 58 | +9 | 64 | 9 | 4 | 6 | 39 | 31 | +8 | 10 | 3 | 6 | 28 | 27 | +1 |

Source: Süper Lig

==== Results by round ====
| Round | 1 | 2 | 3 | 4 | 5 | 6 | 7 | 8 | 9 | 10 | 11 | 12 | 13 | 14 | 15 | 16 | 17 | 18 | 19 | 20 | 21 | 22 | 23 | 24 | 25 | 26 | 27 | 28 | 29 | 30 | 31 | 32 | 33 | 34 | 35 | 36 | 37 | 38 |
|---|---|---|---|---|---|---|---|---|---|---|---|---|---|---|---|---|---|---|---|---|---|---|---|---|---|---|---|---|---|---|---|---|---|---|---|---|---|---|
| Ground | A | H | A | H | A | H | A | A | H | A | H | A | H | A | H | A | H | A | H | H | A | H | A | H | A | H | H | A | H | A | H | A | H | A | H | A | H | A |
| Result | W | L | L | W | W | W | D | D | W | W | D | L | W | L | L | W | L | L | D | D | W | W | W | D | D | L | W | W | L | W | W | L | L | L | W | W | W | W |
| Position | 6 | 9 | 13 | 11 | 8 | 7 | 7 | 9 | 7 | 4 | 3 | 5 | 4 | 5 | 6 | 6 | 6 | 8 | 8 | 10 | 8 | 5 | 3 | 5 | 5 | 7 | 7 | 5 | 5 | 4 | 4 | 6 | 6 | 6 | 5 | 5 | 5 | 5 |

Updated to match(es) played on 22 May 2022. Source: Süper Lig
A = Away; H = Home; W = Win; D = Draw; L = Loss

==== Matches ====
| 15 August 2021 1 | İstanbul Başakşehir | 0–1 | Alanyaspor | Istanbul |
| 19:15 TRT (UTC+3) | | Report | Borja 12'; Davidson (yellow card) 30'; Siopis (yellow card) 64' | Stadium: Başakşehir Fatih Terim Stadium; Attendance: 290; Referee: Yaşar Kemal Uğurlu |

| 21 August 2021 2 | Alanyaspor | 1–4 | Altay | Alanya |
| 21:45 TRT (UTC+3) | | Report | | Stadium: Bahçeşehir Okulları Stadium |

| 13 September 2021 4 | Alanyaspor | 1–0 | Giresunspor | Alanya |
| 20:00 TRT (UTC+3) | | Report | | Stadium: Bahçeşehir Okulları Stadium |

| 19 September 2021 5 | Galatasaray | 0–1 | Alanyaspor | Sarıyer, Istanbul |
| 16:00 TRT | | Report | Akbaba (yellow card) 40'; Diédhiou (yellow card) 48'; Aksoy (yellow card) 55'; Kırıntılı (yellow card) 83'; Candeias 87'; Karaca (yellow card) 89' | Stadium: Türk Telekom Stadium; Attendance: 12,963; Referee: Abdulkadir Bitigen |

| 23 September 2021 6 | Alanyaspor | 2–0 | Kasımpaşa | Alanya |
| 20:00 TRT (UTC+3) | | Report | | Stadium: Bahçeşehir Okulları Stadium |

| 27 September 2021 7 | Trabzonspor | 1–1 | Alanyaspor | Trabzon |
| 20:00 | Türkmen (yellow card) 27' (yellow-red card) 75'; Cornelius 42' | Report | Diédhiou 36'; Davidson (yellow card) 79'; Awaziem (yellow card) 80' | Stadium: Şenol Güneş Stadium; Referee: Halis Özkahya |

| 2 October 2021 8 | Konyaspor | 1–1 | Alanyaspor | Konya |
| 13:30 TRT (UTC+3) | Hadžiahmetović (yellow card) 27'; Awaziem 87' (o.g.); Gürler (yellow card) 90+4' | Report | Milunović (yellow card) 14'; Aksoy 49'; Borja (yellow card) 74'; Diédhiou (yellow card) 84' | Stadium: Konya Metropolitan Municipality Stadium; Referee: (Turkey) Mert Güzenge |

| 18 October 2021 9 | Alanyaspor | 6–3 | Kayserispor | Alanya |
| 20:00 TRT (UTC+3) | Karaca 14'; Hosseini 22' (o.g.); Awaziem (yellow card) 32'; Güneş (yellow card) 36' (goal) 55'; Diédhiou (yellow card) 36' (goal) 77'; Davidson 45' 79' | Report | Bulut 9'; Gavranović 15'; Subaşı (yellow card) 50'; Akdağ (yellow card) 52'; Pektemek 88'; Gustavo Campanharo (yellow card) 89' | Stadium: Bahçeşehir Okulları Stadium; Referee: (Turkey) Ümit Öztürk |

| 24 October 2021 10 | Fenerbahçe | 1–2 | Alanyaspor | Istanbul |
| 19:00 TRT (UTC+3) | Zajc (yellow card) 32'; Dursun 80'; Novák (yellow card) 85' | Report | Novais (yellow card) 70'; Akbaba 75'; Bekiroğlu 90+3' | Stadium: Şükrü Saracoğlu Stadium; Attendance: 24,369; Referee: (Turkey) Halil Umut Meler |

| 31 October 2021 11 | Alanyaspor | 2–2 | Göztepe | Alanya |
| 15:00 TRT (UTC+3) | Davidson 3' (yellow card) 90+11'; Aksoy (yellow card) 46'; Diédhiou (yellow card) 67'; Milunović 89' | Report | Nwobodo (yellow card) 16'; Çankaya (yellow card) 28'; Paluli (yellow card) 32'; Bureković (yellow card) 44'; Eğribayat (yellow card) 56'; Aydoğdu (yellow card) 57'; Tijanić 62'; Lourency 78' | Stadium: Bahçeşehir Okulları Stadium; Attendance: 2,980; Referee: (Turkey) Mete Kalkavan |

| 5 November 2021 12 | Rizespor | 2–0 | Alanyaspor | Rize |
| 19:00 TRT (UTC+3) | Ay 11'; Holmén (yellow card) 25'; Đoković 70' (pen.); Dabo (yellow card) 90+5' | Report | | Stadium: Yeni Rize Şehir Stadium; Referee: (Turkey) Fırat Aydınus |

| 20 November 2021 13 | Alanyaspor | 2–0 | Beşiktaş | Antalya |
| 19:00 TRT (UTC+3) | Babacar 14'; Karaca (yellow card) 23'; Juanfran (yellow card) 49'; Diédhiou 90+4' | Report | Ghezzal (yellow card) 38' | Stadium: Bahçeşehir Okulları Stadium; Referee: (Turkey) Alper Ulusoy |

| 27 November 2021 14 | Antalyaspor | 3–0 | Alanyaspor | Antalya |
| 12:30 TRT (UTC+3) | Balcı 40'; Amilton (yellow card) 54'; Mukairu 68'; Floranus 90' | Report | Awaziem (yellow card) 35'; Bingöl (yellow card) 59' (yellow-red card) 65' | Stadium: Antalya Stadium; Referee: (Turkey) Ali Şansalan |

| 4 December 2021 15 | Alanyaspor | 0–1 | Sivasspor | Antalya |
| 13:30 TRT (UTC+3) | Awaziem (yellow card) 67'; Aksoy (yellow card) 80' | Report | Yatabaré (yellow card) 17'; Kesgin 53'; Çiftçi (yellow card) 85' (yellow-red card) 86' | Stadium: Bahçeşehir Okulları Stadium; Referee: (Turkey) Yasar Kemal Ugurlu |

| 12 December 2021 16 | Yeni Malatyaspor | 2–6 | Alanyaspor | Malatya |
| 15:00 TRT (UTC+3) | Aabid 4'; Haddadi (yellow card) 11' (yellow-red card) 65'; Tetteh 17' (yellow card) 37'; Büyük (yellow card) 27' | Report | Diédhiou 14' (pen.) 56'; Milunović (yellow card) 16'; Davidson 23'; Akbaba 33'; João Novais 52' (yellow card) 63'; Bingöl (yellow card) 68'; Babacar 90' | Stadium: New Malatya Stadium; Referee: (Turkey) Yasin Kol |

| 18 December 2021 17 | Alanyaspor | 1–3 | Adana Demirspor | Alanya |
| 18:00 TRT (UTC+3) | Bingöl (yellow card) 23'; Diédhiou 30'; Awaziem (yellow card) 90' | Report | Vargas 26'; Balotelli 43' (yellow card) 67'; Bjarnason 51' | Stadium: Bahçeşehir Okulları Stadium; Referee: (Turkey) Hüseyin Göçek |

| 22 December 2021 18 | Gaziantep | 2–1 | Alanyaspor | Gaziantep |
| 19:00 TRT (UTC+3) | Erdoğan (yellow card) 15'; Soyalp 56'; Diédhiou 78' (o.g.) | Report | João Novais 62'; Babacar (yellow card) 90' | Stadium: Gaziantep Stadium; Referee: (Turkey) Tugay Numanoğlu |

| 26 December 2021 19 | Alanyaspor | 1–1 | Fatih Karagümrük | Alanya |
| 15:00 TRT (UTC+3) | Bingöl (yellow card) 21'; Bekiroğlu 57' | Report | Durmaz (yellow card) 6'; Pešić 70'; Dursun (yellow card) 83' | Stadium: Bahçeşehir Okulları Stadium; Referee: (Turkey) Alper Ulusoy |

| 8 January 2022 20 | Alanyaspor | 1–1 | İstanbul Başakşehir | Antalya |
| 16:00 TRT (UTC+3) | Babacar 13'; Güneş (red card) 55'; Akbaba (yellow card) 66'; Bekiroğlu (yellow card) 72' | Report | Kaldırım (yellow card) 37'; Şahiner (yellow card) 38' (yellow-red card) 41'; Caiçara 45'; Gulbrandsen (yellow card) 89' | Stadium: Bahçeşehir Okulları Stadium; Attendance: 1,252; Referee: (Turkey) Mustafa Kürşad Filiz |

| 16 January 2022 21 | Altay | 0–2 | Alanyaspor | İzmir |
| 12:30 TRT (UTC+3) | Naderi (yellow card) 19'; Lis (yellow card) 61'; Thaciano (yellow card) 64'; Marco Paixão (yellow card) 77' | Report | Akbaba 26'; Aydın 81'; Milunović (yellow card) 89' | Stadium: Alsancak Mustafa Denizli Stadium; Attendance: 2,665; Referee: (Turkey) Volkan Bayarslan |

| 20 January 2022 22 | Alanyaspor | 6–0 | Hatayspor | Alanya |
| 16:00 TRT (UTC+3) | Akbaba 17' 59' 74'; Wilson Eduardo 31'; Bekiroğlu (yellow card) 40'; Aydın 77' 80' | Report | Kuruçuk (yellow card) 70' | Stadium: Bahçeşehir Okulları Stadium; Referee: (Turkey) Bahattin Şimşek |

| 23 January 2022 23 | Giresunspor | 1–3 | Alanyaspor | Giresun |
| 15:00 TRT (UTC+3) | Nayir 41'; Yavru (yellow card) 55' | Report | Davidson 5'; Akbaba 6' 90+7'; João Novais (yellow card) 34'; Aksoy (yellow card) 44'; Bayır (yellow card) 66'; Bingöl (yellow card) 78' | Stadium: Çotanak Sports Complex; Attendance: 4,291; Referee: (Turkey) Mert Güzenge |

| 6 February 2022 24 | Alanyaspor | 1–1 | Galatasaray | Alanya |
| 16:00 | Eduardo 39'; Juanfran (red card) 72' | Report | Aktürkoğlu 41'; Pulgar (yellow card) 86' | Stadium: Bahçeşehir Okulları Stadium; Attendance: 4,013; Referee: (Turkey) Mete Kalkavan |

| 13 February 2022 25 | Kasımpaşa | 2–2 | Alanyaspor | Istanbul |
| 18:00 | Serbest (yellow card) 21'; Haspolat (yellow card) 45'; Fall 65'; Muleka 68'; Hadergjonaj (yellow card) 90+4' | Report | Wilson Eduardo 42'; Bekiroğlu (yellow card) 45' (goal) 74' | Stadium: Recep Tayyip Erdoğan Stadium; Referee: (Turkey) Yaşar Uğurlu |

| 20 February 2022 26 | Alanyaspor | 0–4 | Trabzonspor | Antalya |
| 16:00 | Eduardo (penalty missed) 67' | Report | Nwakaeme 5', 26'; Cornelius 36'; Toköz 39' | Stadium: Bahçeşehir Okulları Stadium; Referee: (Turkey) Halil Umut Meler |

| 27 February 2022 27 | Alanyaspor | 5–1 | Konyaspor | Alanya |
| 15:00 | Demirbağ 26' (o.g.); João Novais (yellow card) 29' (goal) 42'; Güneş 33'; Diédhiou 38' (pen.); Aydın 87' | Report | Bardakcı 11' (yellow card) 38'; Skubic (yellow card) 37'; Demirbağ (yellow card) 59'; Birniçan (red card) 66' | Stadium: Bahçeşehir Okulları Stadium; Referee: (Turkey) Volkan Bayarslan |

| 7 March 2022 28 | Kayserispor | 1–2 | Alanyaspor | Kayseri |
| 19:00 TRT (UTC+3) | Çetin (yellow card) 5'; Akdağ (yellow card) 25'; Bertolacci 34'; Gustavo Campanharo (yellow card) 80' | Report | Aydın 41'; Akbaba (yellow card) 60'; Yardımcı 83' | Stadium: Kadir Has Stadium; Referee: (Turkey) Suat Arslanboğa |

| 13 March 2022 29 | Alanyaspor | 2–5 | Fenerbahçe | Alanya |
| 19:00 TRT (UTC+3) | Awaziem (yellow card) 49'; Bingöl 53' 67' | Report | Rossi 26'; Özil 50' (pen.); Dursun (yellow card) 61'; Güler 78'; Pelkas (yellow card) 87' (goal) 90'; Berisha 90+4' | Stadium: Bahçeşehir Okulları Stadium; Referee: (Turkey) Volkan Bayarslan |

| 19 March 2022 30 | Göztepe | 0–2 | Alanyaspor | İzmir |
| 16:00 TRT (UTC+3) | Nwobodo (yellow card) 52'; Demirtaş (yellow card) 90+6' | Report | Aydın (yellow card) 36'; Diédhiou 71'; Bingöl 90+7' | Stadium: Gürsel Aksel Stadium; Referee: (Turkey) Zorbay Küçük |

| 3 April 2022 31 | Alanyaspor | 2–1 | Rizespor | Alanya |
| 17:00 TRT (UTC+3) | Akbaba 9'; Karaca 60' (pen.) | Report | Cissé 66'; Phiri (yellow card) 75' | Stadium: Bahçeşehir Okulları Stadium; Referee: (Turkey) Halil Meler |

| 9 April 2022 32 | Beşiktaş | 4–1 | Alanyaspor | Istanbul |
| 21:30 TRT (UTC+3) | Batshuayi 2' 43' (yellow card) 60'; Josef de Souza 25'; Welinton (yellow card) 46'; Yalçın 78' | Report | Karaca 23' | Stadium: Vodafone Park; Referee: (Turkey) Volkan Bayarslan |

| 16 April 2022 33 | Alanyaspor | 1–3 | Antalyaspor | Alanya |
| 17:00 TRT (UTC+3) | Karaca (yellow card) 38'; Diédhiou 78' | Report | Wright 17'; Balcı (yellow card) 19'; Özmert (yellow card) 36'; Bayrakdar 40' 58'; Vural (yellow card) 86' | Stadium: Bahçeşehir Okulları Stadium; Referee: (Turkey) Yaşar Uğurlu |

| 25 April 2022 34 | Sivasspor | 1–0 | Alanyaspor | Sivas |
| 21:30 TRT (UTC+3) | Goutas (yellow card) 36'; Fajr 52' (pen.); Yeşilyurt (yellow card) 90+1' | Report | João Novais (yellow card) 34'; Milunović (yellow card) 51'; Karaca (yellow card) 76'; Candeias (yellow card) 89'; Awaziem (yellow card) 90+1' | Stadium: New Sivas 4 Eylül Stadium; Referee: (Turkey) Ümit Öztürk |

| 1 May 2022 35 | Alanyaspor | 2–1 | Yeni Malatyaspor | Alanya |
| 17:00 TRT (UTC+3) | Candeias 65'; Aydın 66' (yellow card) 72'; João Novais (yellow card) 77' | Report | Özer (red card) 23'; Dicko 31'; Çağıran (yellow card) 45' | Stadium: Bahçeşehir Okulları Stadium; Referee: (Turkey) Turgut Doman |

| 7 May 2022 36 | Adana Demirspor | 1–2 | Alanyaspor | Adana |
| 20:00 TRT (UTC+3) | Uludağ (yellow card) 30'; Belhanda 32'; Çokçalış (yellow card) 60'; Balotelli (yellow card) 61'; Güler (yellow card) 89' | Report | Sanuç 19' (o.g.); Diédhiou (yellow card) 22'; Awaziem (yellow card) 50'; Güneş (yellow card) 65'; Akbaba 76'; Bingöl (yellow card) 82' | Stadium: New Adana Stadium; Referee: (Turkey) Ümit Öztürk |

| 15 May 2022 37 | Alanyaspor | 3–0 | Gaziantep | Alanya |
| 20:00 TRT (UTC+3) | Bayır (yellow card) 2'; Diédhiou 59'; Bekiroğlu (yellow card) 62'; Akbaba (yellow card) 83'; Wilson Eduardo 89'; Candeias 90' | Report | Pehlivan (yellow card) 33'; Sagal (yellow card) 43'; Toșca (yellow card) 85' | Stadium: Bahçeşehir Okulları Stadium; Referee: (Turkey) Bahattin Şimşek |

| 22 May 2022 38 | Fatih Karagümrük | 0–1 | Alanyaspor | Istanbul |
| 17:00 TRT (UTC+3) | Luckassen (yellow card) 90+3' | Report | Awaziem (yellow card) 33'; Karaca 37'; Fer (yellow card) 55' | Stadium: Atatürk Olympic Stadium; Referee: (Turkey) Fırat Aydınus |

=== Turkish Cup ===
| 1 December 2021 Fourth round | Alanyaspor | 6–0 | Osmaniyespor FK | Antalya |
| 17:00 | Diedhiou 20'; Akbaba 54'; Eduardo 58'; Aydın 68'; Karaca 81'; Tetah 87' | | | Stadium: Bahçeşehir Okulları |

| 29 December 2021 Fifth round | Alanyaspor | 5–0 | Mardin 1969 Spor | Antalya |
| 13:00 | Babacar 17', 30', 48'; Akbaba 33' (pen.); Aydın 53' | | | Stadium: Bahçeşehir Okulları |

| 10 February 2022 Round of 16 | Alanyaspor | 1–1 (a.e.t.) (4–2 p) | Adana Demirspor | Antalya |
| 17:30 | | Report | | Stadium: Bahçeşehir Okulları |

| 3 March 2022 Quarter-finals | Alanyaspor | 2–1 (a.e.t.) | Gaziantep FK | Alanya |
| 19:30 | Bingöl 74' (yellow card) 98'; Karaca (yellow card) 90+3'; Aydın 102'; Awaziem (yellow card) 107'; Marafona (yellow card) 108' | Report | Ceylan (yellow card) 86'; Djilobodji 90+1'; Maxim (yellow card) 105'; Caulker (yellow card) 107' | Stadium: Bahçeşehir Okulları Stadium; Referee: (Turkey) Zorbay Küçük |

| 20 April 2022 Semi-finals First Leg | Alanyaspor | 1–2 | Sivasspor | Alanya |
| 21:30 | Akbaba 6'; Bayır (yellow card) 24' | Report | Yatabaré 32' (yellow card) 59' (yellow-red card) 59'; Ulvestad (yellow card) 54'; Gradel (yellow card) 58'; Kesgin (yellow card) 88' (goal) 90+2' | Stadium: Bahçeşehir Okulları Stadium; Referee: (Turkey) Ali Şansalan |

| 11 May 2022 Semi-finals Second Leg | Sivasspor | 1–1 (3-2 agg.) | Alanyaspor | Sivas |
| 20:30 | Ulvestad (yellow card) 35'; Oğuz (yellow card) 45'; Arslan 88' (yellow card) 88' | Report | Bayır (yellow card) 54'; Diédhiou 78'; Candeias (yellow card) 86'; Karaca (yellow card) 88'; João Novais (yellow card) 90+4'; Chidozie Awaziem (yellow card) 90+11' | Stadium: New Sivas 4 Eylül Stadium; Referee: (Turkey) Atilla Karaoğlan |
