= List of Turkish football transfers winter 2024–25 =

This is a list of Turkish football transfers for the 2024–25 winter transfer window. Only transfers featuring Süper Lig are listed.

== Süper Lig ==
Note: Flags indicate national team as has been defined under FIFA eligibility rules. Players may hold more than one non-FIFA nationality.

=== Galatasaray ===
In:

No.	Pos.	Nation	Player
17	DF	TUR	Eren Elmalı (from Trabzonspor)
21	FW	TUR	Ahmed Kutucu (from Eyüpspor)
26	DF	COL	Carlos Cuesta (from (Belgium) Genk)
29	DF	POL	Przemysław Frankowski (on loan from (France) Lens)
77	FW	ESP	Álvaro Morata (on loan from (Italy) Milan)
99	MF	GAB	Mario Lemina (from (England) Wolverhampton Wanderers)

Out:

No.	Pos.	Nation	Player
12	GK	TUR	Batuhan Şen (on loan to Kocaelispor)
22	MF	MAR	Hakim Ziyech (to (Qatar) Al-Duhail)
25	DF	DEN	Victor Nelsson (on loan to (Italy) Roma)
44	FW	BEL	Michy Batshuayi (to (Germany) Eintracht Frankfurt)
58	DF	TUR	Ali Yeşilyurt (on loan to (Moldova) Zimbru Chișinău)
—	MF	ITA	Nicolò Zaniolo (on loan to (Italy) Fiorentina, previously on loan at (Italy) Atalanta)
—	MF	TUR	Baran Aksaka (on loan to 68 Aksarayspor, previously on loan at (Bulgaria) Arda Kardzhali)
—	FW	TUR	Eren Aydın (on loan to Sarıyer, previously on loan at Boluspor)
—	FW	CIV	Wilfried Zaha (on loan to (United States) Charlotte, previously on loan at (France) Lyon)

=== Fenerbahçe ===
In:

No.	Pos.	Nation	Player
33	DF	BRA	Diego Carlos (from (England) Aston Villa)
37	DF	SVK	Milan Škriniar (on loan from (France) Paris Saint-Germain)
94	MF	BRA	Talisca (from (Saudi Arabia) Al-Nassr)
—	DF	SRB	Ognjen Mimović (from (Serbia) Red Star Belgrade)

Out:

No.	Pos.	Nation	Player
3	DF	TUR	Samet Akaydin (to Çaykur Rizespor)
11	MF	ENG	Ryan Kent (free agent)
20	FW	TUR	Cengiz Ünder (on loan to (United States) Los Angeles)
28	MF	TUR	Bartuğ Elmaz (on loan to (Slovenia) Maribor)
—	DF	SRB	Ognjen Mimović (on loan to (Russia) Zenit)
—	DF	TUR	Yiğit Fidan (on loan to İstanbulspor, previously on loan at Fatih Karagümrük)
—	MF	BRA	Lincoln (on loan to (England) Hull City, previously on loan at (Brazil) Red Bull Bragantino)
—	DF	TUR	Emir Ortakaya (to (Belgium) Beerschot, previously on loan at (Belgium) Westerlo)
—	MF	CIV	Marius Trésor Doh (to Fatih Karagümrük, previously on loan)

=== Trabzonspor ===
In:

No.	Pos.	Nation	Player
14	FW	UKR	Danylo Sikan (from (Ukraine) Shakhtar Donetsk)
19	MF	TUR	Mustafa Eskihellaç (from Gaziantep)
22	MF	UKR	Oleksandr Zubkov (from (Ukraine) Shakhtar Donetsk)
26	MF	FRA	Tim Jabol-Folcarelli (from (France) Ajaccio)

Out:

No.	Pos.	Nation	Player
3	DF	CRO	Borna Barišić (on loan to (Spain) Leganés)
8	MF	MKD	Enis Bardhi (to Bodrum)
18	DF	TUR	Eren Elmalı (to Galatasaray)
19	FW	TUR	Umut Bozok (to Eyüpspor)
20	DF	TUR	Serkan Asan (on loan to Iğdır)
23	MF	TUR	Umut Güneş (to İstanbul Başakşehir)
24	DF	SUR	Stefano Denswil (free agent)
90	FW	TUR	Poyraz Efe Yıldırım (on loan to Ümraniyespor)
99	FW	CRO	Mislav Oršić (to (Cyprus) Pafos)
—	FW	MAR	Montasser Lahtimi (to (Kuwait) Kazma)

=== İstanbul Başakşehir ===
In:

No.	Pos.	Nation	Player
20	MF	TUR	Umut Güneş (from Trabzonspor)
26	FW	TUR	Yusuf Sarı (from Adana Demirspor)
21	DF	CIV	Christopher Opéri (from (France) Le Havre)
36	DF	IRL	Festy Ebosele (from (Italy) Udinese, previously on loan at (England) Watford)
77	FW	CRO	Ivan Brnić (from (Greece) Olympiacos, previously on loan at (Slovenia) Celje)

Out:

No.	Pos.	Nation	Player
10	MF	TUR	Berkay Özcan (on loan to Çaykur Rizespor)
14	MF	GRE	Dimitrios Pelkas (to (Greece) PAOK)
24	DF	TUR	Eren Karaağaç (on loan to Bornova 1877)
28	MF	TUR	Metin Emre Karaal (on loan to Muşspor)
70	DF	TUR	Burak Sefa Kavraz (on loan to Batman Petrolspor)
75	DF	TUR	Emre Kaplan (on loan to Ümraniyespor)
91	FW	BRA	Davidson (to (China) Qingdao West Coast)
—	DF	TUR	Efe Arda Koyuncu (on loan to Kepezspor, previously on loan at Şanlıurfaspor)
—	MF	CIV	Mohamed Fofana (on loan to (Georgia (country)) Dinamo Batumi, previously on loan at Gençlik Gücü)
—	FW	TUR	Muhammet Arslantaş (on loan to Muğlaspor, previously on loan at Elazığspor)
—	FW	TUR	Efecan Barlık (on loan to Anadolu Üniversitesi, previously on loan at Kırklarelispor)
—	FW	TUR	Eray Sürül (on loan to Kırklarelispor, previously on loan at Karaköprü Belediyespor)
—	DF	CHN	Wu Shaocong (to (China) Beijing Guoan, previously on loan at (Poland) Radomiak Radom)

=== Kasımpaşa ===
In:

No.	Pos.	Nation	Player
11	FW	AUT	Can Keleş (on loan from Beşiktaş)
38	GK	TUR	Sinan Bolat (on loan from (Belgium) Westerlo)
54	MF	TUR	Atakan Müjde (from Yeni Malatyaspor)
91	DF	POL	Kamil Piątkowski (on loan from (Austria) Red Bull Salzburg)

Out:

No.	Pos.	Nation	Player
4	DF	NGR	Kenneth Omeruo (free agent)
11	FW	TUR	Erdem Çetinkaya (on loan to Sarıyer)
17	MF	MAR	Driess Saddiki (free agent)
26	MF	KOS	Loret Sadiku (on loan to Adanaspor)
41	MF	MKD	Berat Kalkan (to Etimesgut Belediyespor)
99	FW	TUR	Ali Demirel (to (Romania) Petrolul Ploiești)
—	FW	TUR	Alp Efe Kılınç (on loan to Etimesgut Belediyespor, previously on loan at Adanaspor)

=== Beşiktaş ===
In:

No.	Pos.	Nation	Player
10	MF	ECU	Keny Arroyo (from (Ecuador) Independiente del Valle)
77	MF	COL	Élan Ricardo (from (Colombia) La Equidad)

Out:

No.	Pos.	Nation	Player
6	MF	LBA	Al-Musrati (on loan to (France) Monaco)
71	MF	CMR	Jean Onana (on loan to (Italy) Genoa)
73	MF	FRA	Cher Ndour (loan return to (France) Paris Saint-Germain)
77	FW	AUT	Can Keleş (on loan to Kasımpaşa)
—	FW	TUR	Azad Demir (on loan to Zonguldak Kömürspor, previously on loan at Batman Petrolspor)
—	MF	TUR	Abdullah Aydın (to Karaköprü Belediyespor, previously on loan at Erbaaspor)
—	MF	TUR	Abdülmecid Dönmez (to Kastamonuspor, previously on loan at Arnavutköy Belediyespor)

=== Sivasspor ===
In:

No.	Pos.	Nation	Player
22	FW	SRB	Veljko Simić (from (Cyprus) Omonia)
30	MF	TUR	Tolga Ciğerci (from Ankaragücü)
80	MF	TUR	Efkan Bekiroğlu (on loan from Ankaragücü)

Out:

No.	Pos.	Nation	Player
1	GK	TUR	Hüseyin Arslan (to Karacabey Belediyespor)
6	DF	TUR	Özkan Yiğiter (on loan to Vanspor)
77	FW	SEN	Keita Baldé (free agent)
—	FW	TUR	Mert Dursun (on loan to 23 Elazığ, previously on loan at Belediye Kütahyaspor)

=== Alanyaspor ===
In:

No.	Pos.	Nation	Player
2	DF	TUR	Batuhan Yavuz (from (Germany) MSV Duisburg)
4	DF	TUR	Umut Mert Toy (from Pendikspor, previously on loan at Fethiyespor)
8	MF	TUR	Enes Keskin (from Pendikspor)
10	FW	SLO	Andraž Šporar (from (Greece) Panathinaikos)
52	MF	NED	Tonny Vilhena (on loan from (Greece) Panathinaikos)

Out:

No.	Pos.	Nation	Player
4	DF	TUR	Furkan Bayır (to Göztepe)
10	FW	TUR	Serdar Dursun (to (Iran) Persepolis)
11	FW	POR	Rony Lopes (on loan to (Portugal) Farense)
22	FW	TUR	Bera Çeken (on loan to Alanya 1221)
27	MF	ANG	Loide Augusto (to (Brazil) Vasco da Gama)
70	FW	BRA	Juan Christian (to (Brazil) Cuiabá)
—	MF	TUR	Emin Sarıgül (to (Netherlands) ADO Den Haag U21)

=== Çaykur Rizespor ===
In:

No.	Pos.	Nation	Player
3	DF	TUR	Samet Akaydin (from Fenerbahçe)
7	MF	TUR	Abdülkadir Ömür (on loan from (England) Hull City)
20	MF	TUR	Berkay Özcan (on loan from İstanbul Başakşehir)
35	GK	TUR	Efe Doğan (from Bucaspor 1928)

Out:

No.	Pos.	Nation	Player
3	DF	TUR	Halil İbrahim Pehlivan (to Ankaragücü)
7	FW	TUR	Benhur Keser (on loan to Esenler Erokspor)
16	DF	TUR	Seyfettin Anıl Yaşar (on loan to Esenler Erokspor)
20	MF	BIH	Amir Hadžiahmetović (loan return to Beşiktaş)
40	GK	TUR	Canberk Yurdakul (on loan to Esenler Erokspor)
50	MF	TUR	Efe Geçim (on loan to Bornova 1877)
90	FW	BUL	Martin Minchev (to (Poland) Cracovia)
—	DF	TUR	Hüseyincan Kırıkcı (on loan to Artvin Hopaspor, previously on loan at Edirnespor)
—	MF	TUR	Eren Emre Aydın (on loan to 1461 Trabzon, previously on loan at 24 Erzincanspor)
—	FW	TUR	Remzi Kolcuoğlu (on loan to Çayelispor, previously on loan at Kepez Belediyespor)
—	FW	TUR	Efe Tecimer (on loan to Artvin Hopaspor, previously on loan at Zonguldak Kömürspor)

=== Antalyaspor ===
In:

No.	Pos.	Nation	Player

Out:

No.	Pos.	Nation	Player
44	DF	TUR	Efecan Gülerce (on loan to Kepezspor)
72	DF	TUR	Harun Toprak (on loan to Kepezspor)
99	GK	TUR	Kağan Arıcan (on loan to Kepezspor)
—	MF	BDI	Yannick Nkurunziza (on loan to Gençlik Gücü)

=== Gaziantep ===
In:

No.	Pos.	Nation	Player
17	DF	TUR	Semih Güler (from Adana Demirspor)
21	FW	GHA	Emmanuel Boateng (from (Saudi Arabia) Al-Orobah)
23	MF	TUR	Muhammed Gümüşkaya (on loan from (Belgium) Westerlo)
40	DF	TUR	İzzet Erdal (from (Germany) Hoffenheim II)
51	DF	SUI	Anel Husić (on loan from (Switzerland) Young Boys)

Out:

No.	Pos.	Nation	Player
7	MF	TUR	Mustafa Eskihellaç (to Trabzonspor)
13	DF	ESP	Enric Saborit (to (Chile) Deportes Iquique)
14	MF	MTQ	Cyril Mandouki (free agent)
16	FW	TUR	Ali Mevran Ablak (on loan to Kırşehir Belediyespor)
17	FW	TUR	Mirza Cihan (on loan to Adanaspor)
23	FW	TUR	İlker Karakaş (on loan to Batman Petrolspor)
30	FW	TUR	Eren Erdoğan (on loan to Boluspor)
87	MF	TUR	Eren Çakır (on loan to Menemen)
98	MF	TUR	Mehmet Kuzucu (on loan to Zonguldak Kömürspor)
—	MF	AUT	Onurhan Babuşcu (on loan to Anadolu Üniversitesi, previously on loan at (Austria) Hartberg)
—	MF	TUR	Berke Gürbüz (on loan to Hacettepe, previously on loan at 23 Elazığ)

=== Adana Demirspor ===
In:

No.	Pos.	Nation	Player

Out:

No.	Pos.	Nation	Player
4	DF	TUR	Semih Güler (to Gaziantep)
7	FW	TUR	Yusuf Sarı (to İstanbul Başakşehir)
15	DF	MKD	Jovan Manev (to (Croatia) Rijeka)
29	MF	ALB	Florent Shehu (to (Croatia) Opatija)
77	FW	TUN	Motez Nourani (free agent)

=== Samsunspor ===
In:

No.	Pos.	Nation	Player

Out:

No.	Pos.	Nation	Player
25	GK	TUR	Muammer Yıldırım (to Elazığspor)
27	FW	COD	Gaëtan Laura (to Ankaragücü)
29	FW	AUT	Ercan Kara (on loan to (Austria) Rapid Wien)
65	MF	CIV	Moussa Guel (to (France) Paris 13 Atletico)
72	DF	TUR	Mustafa Tan (on loan to Serik Belediyespor)
77	DF	TUR	Enes Albak (on loan to Ankara Demirspor)
—	FW	TUR	Ali Kılıç (on loan to Çankaya, previously on loan at Mardin 1969)
—	MF	GUI	Elhadj Bah (to Yenicami Ağdelen, previously on loan at (France) Châteaubriant)

=== Kayserispor ===
In:

No.	Pos.	Nation	Player

Out:

No.	Pos.	Nation	Player
70	FW	POR	Aylton Boa Morte (to (United Arab Emirates) Khor Fakkan)
—	FW	TUR	Hayrullah Erkip (to Etimesgut Belediyespor, previously on loan at Kırklarelispor)

=== Hatayspor ===
In:

No.	Pos.	Nation	Player

Out:

No.	Pos.	Nation	Player
1	GK	TUR	Erce Kardeşler (on loan to Amed)
31	DF	GER	Oğuzhan Matur (on loan to Adanaspor)
99	FW	HON	Rigoberto Rivas (to Kocaelispor)
—	FW	TUR	Onur Arı (on loan to Zonguldak Kömürspor, previously on loan at Kahramanmaraş İstiklalspor)

=== Konyaspor ===
In:

No.	Pos.	Nation	Player
17	DF	TUR	Abdurrahman Üresin (from Serik Belediyespor)
19	MF	TUR	Kaan Akyazı (from Fenerbahçe U19)
42	MF	NOR	Morten Bjørlo (from (Norway) Fredrikstad)
43	GK	TUR	Ahmet Daş (from Karacabey Belediyespor)
—	GK	TUR	Bahadır Han Güngördü (from Ankaragücü)
—	DF	TUR	Mehmet Kaya (from (Germany) Türkspor Dortmund)
—	MF	TUR	Mehmet Güneş (from Yeni Malatyaspor)

Out:

No.	Pos.	Nation	Player
19	MF	TUR	Ufuk Akyol (on loan to Esenler Erokspor)
21	MF	CRO	Niko Rak (to (Slovenia) Primorje)
23	MF	TUR	Semih Kocatürk (on loan to 1922 Konyaspor)
66	MF	TUR	Adem Eren Kabak (on loan to Gençlerbirliği)
96	GK	TUR	Yavuz Aygün (free agent)
—	GK	TUR	Bahadır Han Güngördü (on loan to Iğdır)
—	MF	TUR	Mehmet Güneş (on loan to Ümraniyespor)
—	MF	TUR	Berke Çelik (on loan to Büyükçekmece Tepecikspor, previously on loan at 1922 Konyaspor)
—	FW	TUR	Ahmet Karademir (on loan to 1922 Konyaspor, previously on loan at Isparta 32)
—	FW	TUR	Mehmet Ali Büyüksayar (on loan to Serik Belediyespor, previously on loan at Ümraniyespor)
—	FW	SEN	Bouly Sambou (to Şanlıurfaspor, previously on loan at (Iran) Gol Gohar)

=== Eyüpspor ===
In:

No.	Pos.	Nation	Player
19	FW	TUR	Umut Bozok (from Trabzonspor)
22	MF	TUR	Erdem Çalık (from Pendikspor)
30	MF	TUR	Yalçın Kayan (from Göztepe)
33	MF	UKR	Taras Stepanenko (from (Ukraine) Shakhtar Donetsk)
81	MF	TUR	Hamza Akman (from (Denmark) Sønderjyske)

Out:

No.	Pos.	Nation	Player
10	MF	ESP	Samuel Sáiz (on loan to Pendikspor)
16	MF	ENG	Jonjo Shelvey (to (England) Burnley)
23	FW	TUR	Ahmed Kutucu (to Galatasaray)
39	FW	GRE	Anastasios Chatzigiovanis (on loan to (Greece) Asteras Tripolis)
99	FW	BEL	Gianni Bruno (to Iğdır)
—	DF	TUR	Mustafa Eren Damar (on loan to Mardin 1969)
—	MF	TUR	Can Bayırkan (on loan to Bayburt Özel İdarespor, previously on loan at Belediye Kütahyaspor)
—	FW	TUR	Ahmet Yazar (on loan to Şanlıurfaspor, previously on loan at Kepezspor)
—	FW	TUR	Mete Kaan Demir (on loan to Pendikspor, previously on loan at Gençlerbirliği)
—	DF	TUR	Abdülkadir Aydın (to Tokat Belediye Plevnespor)
—	DF	UZB	Jakhongir Urozov (to (Uzbekistan) Dinamo Samarqand, previously on loan)

=== Göztepe ===
In:

No.	Pos.	Nation	Player
19	FW	BRA	Emersonn (from (Brazil) Athletico Paranaense)
23	DF	TUR	Furkan Bayır (from Alanyaspor)

Out:

No.	Pos.	Nation	Player
10	MF	TUR	Yalçın Kayan (to Eyüpspor)
18	MF	TUR	Ízzet Furkan Malak (on loan to (England) Southampton U21)
81	GK	TUR	Yiğit Yıldız (to Efeler 09)
99	FW	CIV	David Datro Fofana (loan return to (England) Chelsea)
—	MF	TUR	Tuğbey Akgün (to Fatih Karagümrük)
—	MF	ENG	Romal Palmer (to (Republic of Ireland) St Patrick's Athletic, previously on loan)

=== Bodrum ===
In:

No.	Pos.	Nation	Player
10	MF	MKD	Enis Bardhi (from Trabzonspor)
11	FW	COD	Jonathan Okita (from (Switzerland) Zürich)

Out:

No.	Pos.	Nation	Player
8	MF	TUR	Samet Yalçın (to Kocaelispor)
10	FW	TUR	Kenan Özer (to Mağusa Türk Gücü)
18	MF	NGR	Gabriel Obekpa (on loan to (Moldova) Zimbru Chișinău)
28	DF	TUR	Murat Sipahioğlu (on loan to Batman Petrolspor)
84	MF	TUR	Yusuf Sertkaya (on loan to Ümraniyespor)
—	MF	TUR	Eray Akar (on loan to Aliağa, previously on loan at Belediye Kütahyaspor)
—	FW	TUR	Seçkin Batuhan Fırıncı (on loan to Karaman, previously on loan at Beykoz Anadolu)

== See also ==
- 2024–25 Süper Lig
