= José Marafona =

Portuguese footballer

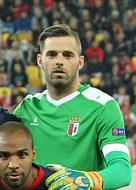
- Marafona with Braga in 2016

Personal information
- Full name: José Carlos Coentrão Marafona
- Date of birth: 8 May 1987 (age 39)
- Place of birth: Vila do Conde, Portugal
- Height: 1.90 m (6 ft 3 in)
- Position: Goalkeeper

Youth career
- 1998–2001: Rio Ave
- 2001–2006: Varzim

Senior career*
Years	Team	Apps	(Gls)
2006–2010	Varzim	58	(0)
2010–2012	Marítimo	0	(0)
2011–2012	→ Aves (loan)	26	(0)
2012–2013	Aves	37	(0)
2013–2015	Moreirense	59	(0)
2015–2016	Paços Ferreira	19	(0)
2016–2019	Braga	42	(0)
2019–2023	Alanyaspor	86	(0)
2023–2026	Paços Ferreira	81	(0)

International career
2017	Portugal	1	(0)
- * Club domestic league appearances and goals as of 19:45, 21 May 2026 (UTC)

José Carlos Coentrão Marafona (born 8 May 1987) is a Portuguese professional footballer who plays as a goalkeeper.

He made 111 Primeira Liga appearances for Moreirense, Paços de Ferreira and Braga, as well as more than 200 in the second tier for Varzim, Aves, Moreirense and Paços. He also spent several years with Alanyaspor in the Turkish Süper Lig.

Marafona earned one cap for Portugal in 2017.

== Club career ==
Born in Vila do Conde, Marafona joined neighbouring Varzim SC's youth system in 2001, aged 14. After making only five Segunda Liga appearances in his first two seasons as a senior, he eventually became first choice.

Marafona signed for C.S. Marítimo in the summer of 2010, being then loaned to C.D. Aves and representing the club over two second-tier campaigns. He appeared in only one competitive match with the former side, precisely against Aves in the Taça da Liga (2–1 home win).

In late August 2013, Marafona joined Moreirense FC, contributing 25 games in his first season as his team returned to the Primeira Liga after one year out. He made his debut in the Portuguese top flight on 17 August 2014, keeping a clean sheet in a 1–0 away victory over C.D. Nacional.

Marafona signed for two years with F.C. Paços de Ferreira also in the top flight, in July 2015. In late January of the following year, however, he moved to S.C. Braga of the same league as his previous contract contained a clause that he was to be released if a bigger team showed interest in acquiring his services. He took part in 14 official matches with the latter until the end of the season, including the final of the Taça de Portugal where he saved two penalty shootout attempts against FC Porto (Héctor Herrera and Maxi Pereira) in an eventual 4–2 win (2–2 after 120 minutes).

Marafona missed the entire 2017–18 campaign, due to a knee injury. On 28 May 2019, he joined Turkish Süper Lig club Alanyaspor on a two-year contract. In the summer of 2022 he, fellow veteran goalkeeper Serkan Kırıntılı and compatriot Daniel Candeias were told they could leave; academy graduate Yusuf Karagöz became first choice.

On 4 January 2023, Marafona returned to Paços Ferreira on a five-month deal. Despite their relegation, his contract was renewed.

== International career ==
On 31 March 2015, at nearly 28 years of age, Marafona was called up to the Portugal national team for the first time, remaining an unused substitute as Anthony Lopes featured in goal in the 0–2 friendly defeat against Cape Verde in Estoril. His debut arrived nearly two years later, in a 2–3 loss to Sweden in Funchal also in an exhibition game.

== Career statistics ==
As of match played 12 May 2024

Appearances and goals by club, season and competition
Club	Season	League			National cup		League cup		Continental		Other		Total	
Club	Season	Division	Apps	Goals	Apps	Goals	Apps	Goals	Apps	Goals	Apps	Goals	Apps	Goals
Varzim	2006–07	Liga de Honra	3	0	0	0	—		—		—		3	0
Varzim	2007–08	Liga de Honra	2	0	0	0	0	0	—		—		2	0
Varzim	2008–09	Liga de Honra	23	0	3	0	0	0	—		—		26	0
Varzim	2009–10	Liga de Honra	30	0	2	0	2	0	—		—		34	0
Varzim	Total		58	0	5	0	2	0	—		—		65	0
Marítimo	2010–11	Primeira Liga	0	0	0	0	1	0	0	0	—		1	0
Aves (loan)	2011–12	Liga de Honra	26	0	1	0	3	0	—		—		30	0
Aves	2012–13	Segunda Liga	37	0	0	0	0	0	—		—		37	0
Aves	Total		63	0	1	0	3	0	—		—		67	0
Moreirense	2013–14	Segunda Liga	25	0	1	0	0	0	—		—		26	0
Moreirense	2014–15	Primeira Liga	34	0	1	0	3	0	—		—		38	0
Moreirense	Total		59	0	2	0	3	0	—		—		64	0
Paços Ferreira	2015–16	Primeira Liga	19	0	0	0	0	0	—		—		19	0
Braga	2015–16	Primeira Liga	13	0	1	0	0	0	0	0	—		14	0
Braga	2016–17	Primeira Liga	29	0	3	0	0	0	2 (Note: Appearances in UEFA Europa League)	0	1 (Note: Appearance in Supertaça Cândido de Oliveira)	0	35	0
Braga	2017–18	Primeira Liga	0	0	0	0	0	0	0	0	—		0	0
Braga	2018–19	Primeira Liga	0	0	6	0	4	0	0	0	—		10	0
Braga	Total		42	0	10	0	4	0	2	0	1	0	59	0
Alanyaspor	2019–20	Süper Lig	33	0	7	0	—		—		—		40	0
Alanyaspor	2020–21	Süper Lig	37	0	4	0	—		1	0	—		42	0
Alanyaspor	2021–22	Süper Lig	16	0	5	0	—		—		—		21	0
Alanyaspor	2022–23	Süper Lig	0	0	0	0	—		—		—		0	0
Alanyaspor	Total		86	0	16	0	—		1	0	—		103	0
Paços Ferreira	2022–23	Primeira Liga	16	0	0	0	0	0	—		—		16	0
Paços Ferreira	2023–24	Liga Portugal 2	29	0	0	0	1	0	—		—		30	0
Paços Ferreira	Total		45	0	0	0	1	0	—		—		46	0
Career total			372	0	34	0	14	0	3	0	1	0	424	0

== Honours ==
Moreirense

- Segunda Liga: 2013–14

Braga

- Taça de Portugal: 2015–16
