= Idrissa Doumbia =

Ivorian footballer

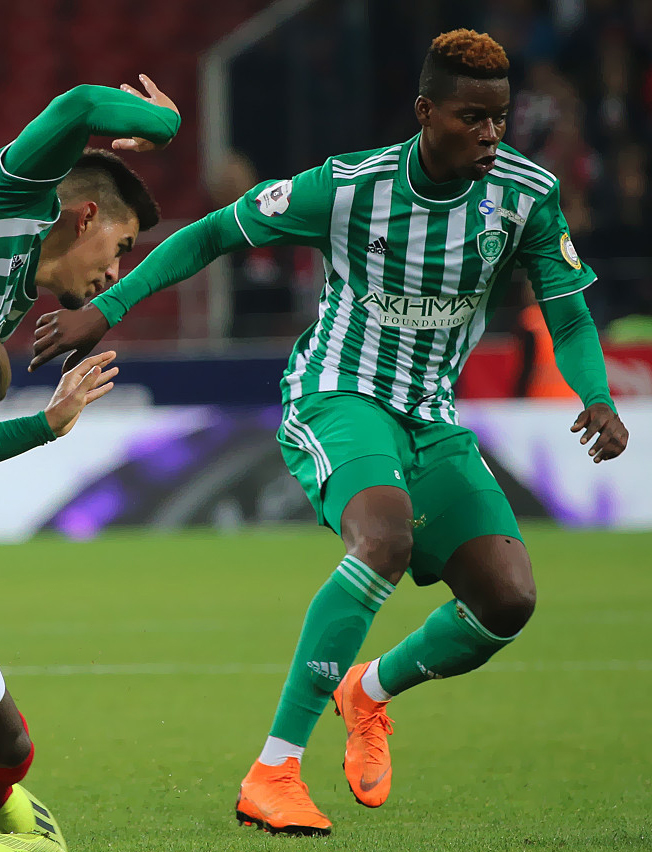
- Doumbia playing for Akhmat Grozny in 2018

Personal information
- Full name: Idrissa Doumbia
- Date of birth: 14 April 1998 (age 28)
- Place of birth: Yamoussoukro, Ivory Coast
- Height: 1.87 m (6 ft 2 in)
- Position: Defensive midfielder

Youth career
- –2016: ES Bingerville

Senior career*
Years	Team	Apps	(Gls)
2016–2018	Anderlecht	2	(0)
2017–2018	→ Zulte Waregem (loan)	25	(1)
2018–2019	Akhmat Grozny	16	(1)
2019–2023	Sporting CP	34	(1)
2020–2021	→ Huesca (loan)	23	(0)
2021–2022	→ Zulte Waregem (loan)	19	(0)
2022–2023	→ Alanyaspor (loan)	25	(2)
2023–2025	Al Ahli	40	(5)
2025-	Kuwait		

International career^{‡}
2016	Ivory Coast U20	1	(0)
2019	Ivory Coast U23	2	(0)
2021	Ivory Coast Olympic	1	(0)
2023–	Ivory Coast	4	(0)
Medal record
Representing Ivory Coast
Men's football
Africa Cup of Nations
Winner	2023 Ivory Coast
- * Club domestic league appearances and goals as of 5 July 2023 ‡ National team caps and goals as of 17 June 2023

Idrissa Doumbia (born 14 April 1998) is an Ivorian professional footballer who plays as a defensive midfielder for the Ivory Coast national team.

== Club career ==
Doumbia made his Anderlecht debut on 30 July 2016 in the first game of the Jupiler Pro League 2016–17 season against Royal Excel Mouscron. In the 2017 Belgian Super Cup he made his first start for Zulte Waregem, against his parent club, Anderlecht.

On 29 June 2018, he signed with the Russian Premier League club FC Akhmat Grozny.

On 15 January 2019, he moved to Portugal, signing a contract with Sporting until 2024 with a €60 million release clause. On 5 October of the following year, he was loaned to La Liga side SD Huesca, for one year.

On 31 August 2021, he returned to Zulte Waregem on loan for the 2021–22 season.

On 5 August 2022, Sporting loaned Doumbia to Turkish side Alanyaspor for the 2022–23 season.

On 26 June 2023, Doumbia joined Qatar Stars League side Al-Ahli SC on a free transfer, signing a two-year contract; with Sporting CP keeping 50% of his economic rights.

== International career ==
Doumbia made his debut for the Ivory Coast U20 in a 3–2 friendly win over the Qatar U20s on 21 March 2016.

Doumbia debuted for the Ivory Coast U23s in a pair of 2019 Africa U-23 Cup of Nations qualification matches in March 2019.

On 28 December 2023, Doumbia was named in Jean-Louis Gasset's 27-man Ivory Coast squad for the 2023 Africa Cup of Nations.

== Career statistics ==
As of match played 3 June 2023

Appearances and goals by club, season and competition
Club	Season	League			National Cup (Note: Includes Belgian Cup, Russian Cup, Taça de Portugal, Copa del Rey and Turkish Cup)		League Cup (Note: Includes Taça da Liga)		Continental		Other		Total	
Club	Season	Division	Apps	Goals	Apps	Goals	Apps	Goals	Apps	Goals	Apps	Goals	Apps	Goals
Anderlecht	2016–17	Belgian First Division A	2	0	1	0	—		2 (Note: Appearance(s) in Europa League)	0	—		5	0
Zulte Waregem (loan)	2017–18	Belgian First Division A	25	1	1	0	—		5	0	3 (Note: 2 appearances in Belgian First Division A UEFA Europa League play-offs, 1 appearance in Belgian Super Cup)	0	34	1
Akhmat Grozny	2018–19	Russian Premier League	16	1	1	0	—		—		—		17	1
Sporting CP	2018–19	Primeira Liga	12	1	2	0	0	0	0	0	—		14	1
Sporting CP	2019–20	Primeira Liga	22	0	1	0	3	0	8	0	1 (Note: Appearance in Supertaça Cândido de Oliveira)	0	35	0
Sporting CP	Total		34	1	3	0	3	0	8	0	1	0	49	1
Huesca (loan)	2020–21	La Liga	23	0	2	0	—		—		—		25	0
Zulte Waregem (loan)	2021–22	Belgian First Division A	19	0	2	0	—		—		—		21	0
Alanyaspor (loan)	2022–23	Süper Lig	25	2	2	1	—		—		—		27	3
Career total			144	5	12	1	3	0	15	0	4	0	178	6

== Honours ==
Sporting

- Taça de Portugal: 2018–19

Ivory Coast U23

- Africa U-23 Cup of Nations runner-up: 2019

Ivory Coast

- Africa Cup of Nations: 2023

Kuwait SC

- Kuwait Emir Cup: 2024-25
- AFC Challenge League: 2025-2026
