= Leroy Fer =

Dutch association football player

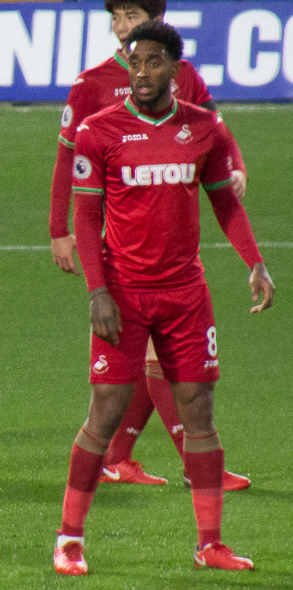
- Fer playing for Swansea City in 2017

Personal information
- Full name: Leroy Johan Fer
- Date of birth: 5 January 1990 (age 36)
- Place of birth: Zoetermeer, Netherlands
- Height: 1.88 m (6 ft 2 in)
- Position: Central midfielder

Team information
- Current team: Gulf United
- Number: 8

Youth career
- –1999: DWO
- 1999–2007: Feyenoord

Senior career*
Years	Team	Apps	(Gls)
2007–2011	Feyenoord	103	(14)
2011–2013	Twente	58	(13)
2013–2014	Norwich City	30	(3)
2014–2016	Queens Park Rangers	48	(8)
2016	→ Swansea City (loan)	11	(0)
2016–2019	Swansea City	79	(8)
2019–2021	Feyenoord	49	(2)
2021–2024	Alanyaspor	81	(2)
2024–2025	Al-Nasr	23	(1)
2025–	Gulf United	23	(2)

International career
2005–2006	Netherlands U16	7	(1)
2006–2007	Netherlands U17	17	(4)
2007–2009	Netherlands U19	15	(2)
2009–2013	Netherlands U21	31	(6)
2010–2014	Netherlands	11	(1)
Medal record
Men's football
Representing Netherlands
FIFA World Cup
Third place	2014
- * Club domestic league appearances and goals as of 7 July 2026

Leroy Johan Fer (born 5 January 1990) is a Dutch professional footballer who plays as a central midfielder for Gulf United.

Fer formerly represented the Netherlands national team, making eleven appearances between 2010 and 2014. He was a part of the Dutch squad that reached third place at the 2014 FIFA World Cup

== Early life ==
Fer was born and raised in Zoetermeer, South Holland. He is the first child of parents from Curaçao. His paternal grandfather was of Surinamese descent. Fer's maternal grandfather was a football player in Curaçao, while his father, Lesley Fer, was a baseball player. Fer has one younger brother, Leegreg, who played for the Feyenoord under-17 team, a sister and his cousin Patrick van Aanholt is a fellow footballer.

== Club career ==
=== Youth career ===
Fer started his youth career at the local Zoetermeer club DWO. In his first full season, his team won friendly matches against youth teams from professional sides, like Sparta Rotterdam and Feyenoord. However, he stayed at DWO until age nine. Together with youth friend Kaj Ramsteijn, Fer accepted the invitation to join the Feyenoord's youth academy. He later progressed through the academy and later Jong Feyenoord.

=== Feyenoord ===
==== Breakthrough (2007–2009) ====
Fer had his breakthrough in Feyenoord's first team in the season 2007–08 and was first called up to the first team ahead of the match against FC Groningen on 25 November 2007 but did not play. He made his official debut for the club under the management of Bert van Marwijk and Fer replaced Nuri Şahin in the 84th minute in the Eredivisie home at age 17, in a 6–0 win match against Heracles Almelo on 2 December 2007. Four days later, on 6 December 2007, Fer signed his first professional contract with Feyenoord, keeping him at De Kuip until summer 2012. This led manager van Marwijk comment on his potential, saying: "Leroy is a footballer with a lot of potential, but you have to be careful with a boy like that. He is still a freshman A-junior and I don't want to destroy him immediately. I think he could handle it but that has yet to become apparent in practice. Leroy makes a stable, calm impression and adapts easily. He does not say much, but he is not introverted either. Leroy is well integrated into the group, but that is always the case with good football players." He was active in 13 Eredivsie matches in his first season, mainly coming in as a substitute. Due to injuries in the club's first team squad, Fer made his first appearance in the starting line-up in the Eredivisie away match against rivals, Ajax, losing 3–0 on 3 February 2008. Fer started on the right back position, which he continued to do so for four matches in a row. On 30 March 2008, he scored his first Eredivisie goal in the away match against NAC Breda, as Feyenoord won 3–1. Fer was involved in the squad for the final of KNVB Cup, coming on in the 71st minute as the club were champions by beating Roda JC 2–0, therefore qualified for the UEFA Cup next season. However, Feyenoord was subjected of investigations over claims of his eligibility while playing for Jong Feyenoord, leading an investigation from the KNVB and the club themselves. An investigation was conducted and Jong Feyenoord was deducted points, resulting in Jong Sparta Rotterdam winning the competition.

In the 2008–09 season, Fer slowly became a first team regular. New Feyenoord coach Gertjan Verbeek often positioned the player on the central attacking midfielder position behind striker Roy Makaay. On 18 September 2008, Fer made his official European debut, as he was named in the starting line-up in the UEFA Cup home match against Kalmar FF. Feyenoord lost the match 0–1, but in the return match in Sweden, Fer scored the winning goal in the 1–2 victory, securing a place in the group stage, which was later credited as own goal by Emin Nouri. Three weeks later on 29 October 2008, he scored his first official goal for the club, in a 2–1 loss against Sparta Rotterdam. This was followed up by scoring his second goal of the season, in a 4–0 win against Roda JC. After missing one match due to illness, Fer scored on his return, in a 3–1 win against ADO Den Haag on 23 November 2008. A month later on 26 December 2008, he scored a brace, in a 3–1 win against NAC Breda. It wasn't until on 15 March 2009 when Fer scored his sixth goal of the season, in a 1–0 win against PSV Eindhoven. However, Fer played in both legs of the play-offs round against NAC Breda, as Feyenoord lost 7–2 on aggaragate. Despite being minor injuries throughout the 2008–09 season, he made forty–one appearances and scoring six times in all competitions. During the season, various European top clubs showed interest in the Feyenoord talent, including Juventus, but Feyenoord refused any cooperation.

==== Recognition (2009–2011) ====
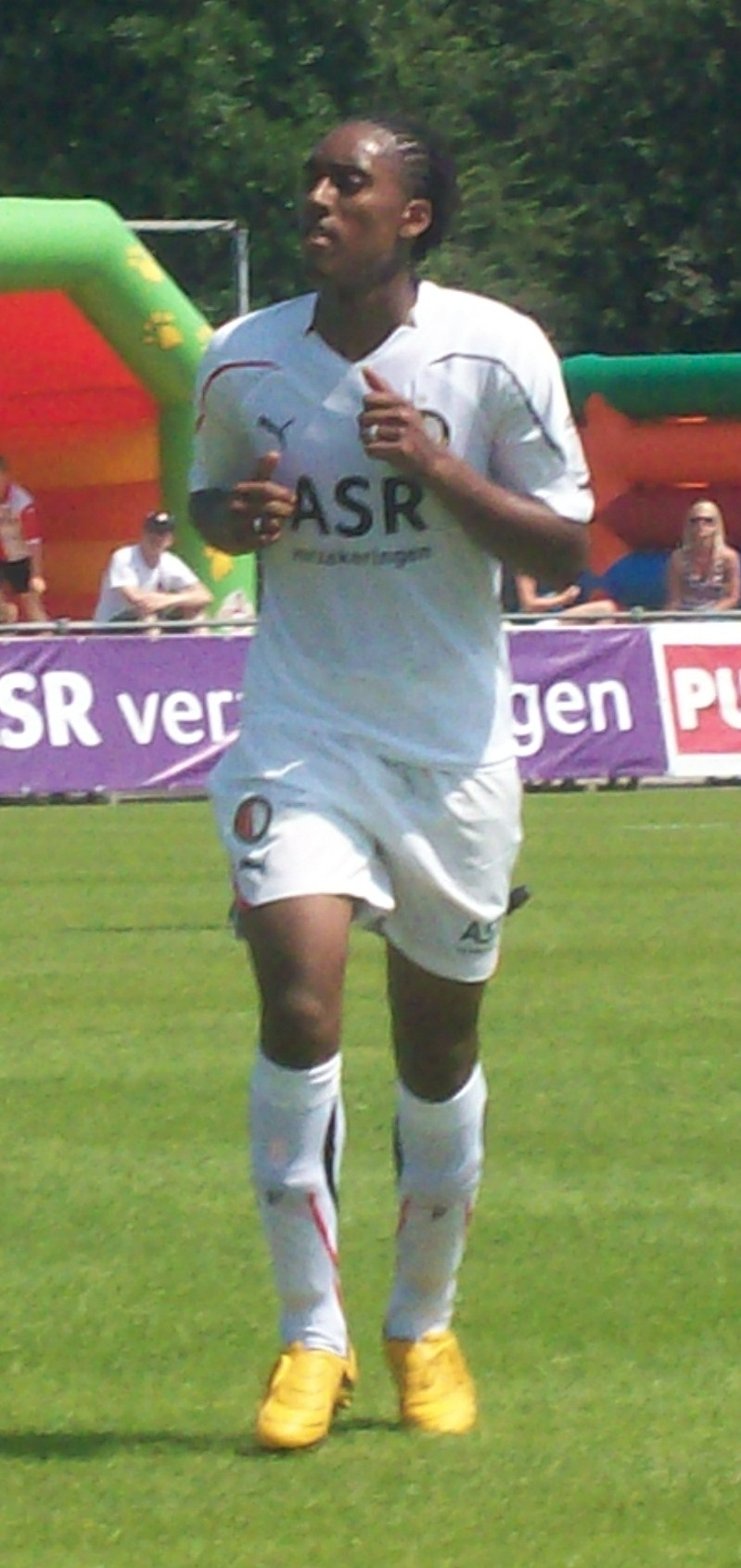
Fer training with Feyenoord in 2010.

Ahead of the 2009–10 season, Fer switched number shirt from twenty–eight to fourteen. In the opening game of the season, he scored his first goal of the season, in a 2–0 win against NEC Nijmegen. For the 2009–10 season, however, Fer lost his status as talent and grew out to be an important player. While he wandered through various playing positions in the previous seasons, from right back to striker, Fer was now constantly placed on the defensive midfielder position by new Feyenoord coach Mario Been. His next goal came on 24 September 2009, in the KNVB Cup away, in a 5–0 win against Harkemase Boys in the second round of the KNVB Beker on 24 September 2009. This was followed up by scoring in the next match, in a 2–0 win against NAC Breda. On 20 October 2009, Feyenoord's new technical director, Leo Beenhakker, criticized the club's first team squad, but at the same time praised Fer for his importance within the team. Three days later, Feyenoord captain Giovanni van Bronckhorst even claimed Fer to be "unmissable" for the squad in Feyenoord TV, while Netherlands national team head coach Bert van Marwijk admitted he was following Fer's development closely and was getting very optimistic about him for a possible call-up. He then played in both legs of KNVB Cup Final against rivals' Ajax, as the club lost 6–1 on aggregate. Despite missing three matches through suspension in the 2009–10 season, Fer went on to make thirty–eight appearances and scoring three times in all competitions.

Ahead of the 2010–11 season, Fer was linked with a move away from Feyenoord, as Premier League club Everton and FC Twente were interested in signing him, but he ended up staying at the club. For the 2010–11 season, Fer's importance for Feyenoord was illustrated after being named the vice-captain of the squad. Upon given the captaincy, he said: "I have already played a number of matches. Then you have to look further and you are no longer a talent. That is why the trainer has made me second captain. I don't feel it as pressure, it is positive and gives a good feeling." Fer was also given a number eight shirt, succeeding Giovanni van Bronckhorst. In the opening game of the season, he scored his first goal of the season, in a 3–1 win against FC Utrecht. Fer scored his second goal of the season, in a 1–0 win against Gent in the first leg of the UEFA Europa League's play–off round. After the club's elimination in the return leg losing 2–0, he was able to help Feyenoord bounce back from defeat by scoring his third goal of the season, and setting up one of the goals, in a 4–0 win against Vitesse on 29 August 2010. Since the start of the 2010–11 season, Fer continued to establish himself in the first team, playing in the central midfield position, though at times, he acknowledged not performing well. Vlaar captained his first match of the season after Ron Vlaar suffered an injury and was substituted at half time, as the club lost 2–1 against rivals, Ajax on 19 September 2010. In a follow–up match against Roda JC in the third round of the KNVB Cup, he had his penalty saved at extra time, as Feyenoord went on to lose 4–3 on penalties following a 1–1 draw throughout the 120 minutes. However, in a match against PSV Eindhoven on 24 October 2010, Vlaar suffered a knee injury and was substituted, as the club went on to lose 10–0. Initially out for weeks, he was eventually sidelined for the next four months. After returning to training in January, Fer made his return to the first team from injury, coming on as a 64th-minute substitute, in a 1–1 draw against Vitesse on 6 February 2011. Having his playing time coming from the substitute bench, he slowly began to retain his place in the first team for the rest of the 2010–11 season. It wasn't until on 10 April 2011 when Fer scored his fourth goal of the season, as well as, setting up the fourth goal of the game, in a 4–0 win against FC Utrecht. At the end of the 2010–11 season, he went on to make twenty–six appearances and scoring four times in all competitions.

Earlier in the 2010–11 season, Feyenoord was determined to keep Fer by opening talks over a new contract. On 18 September 2010, the contract talks officially commence. However, the contract talks was put on hold in December, due to needing more time and it has resumed beyond that point. In April 2011, he wanted to still maintain his commitment with Feyenoord. In the summer transfer window, Fer continued to be in the transfer speculation, leading clubs, such as, Napoli, Fiorentina, Sporting CP and FC Twente were interested in him. But the club were determined to keep the hold of Fer and Georginio Wijnaldum. It was reported on 11 July 2011 that he refused to sign a contract with Feyenoord, causing a rift between the two parties. The incident led to his relationship with the club's supporters to be deteriorated, who even sent him an obituary in his letterbox. Fer later said about Feyenoord's supporters: "This club has a large following and they are great supporters. There are only people who do this and that is a shame. They can be supporters with too much emotion, but the real Feyenoord fans are fantastic and always will be. It is purely a sporting choice, because I want to continue to develop. My feeling for the club Feyenoord does not change anything. I continue to love the club, I have been playing there for twelve years." He later said about looking forward to play under the new management of Ronald Koeman. But manager Koeman later issued an ultimatum to Fer that he must either stay at Feyenoord or leave.

Amid the transfer speculation in the summer transfer window of 2011, Fer made his 100th appearance for Feyenoord in the opening game of the season, in a 2–0 win against SBV Excelsior. After the match, RTV Rijnmond named him the Player of the Week. This was followed up by scoring his first goal of the season, in a 3–0 win against Roda JC. Two weeks later on 28 August 2011, he scored his second goal of the season, in a 2–2 draw against SC Heerenveen in what turned out to be last appearance for the club and didn't play for Feyenoord eight years later.

=== FC Twente ===
After months of ongoing transfer saga, Fer joined fellow Eredivisie club Twente at the end of August 2011 in a deal reported to be worth €5 million. Reflecting on his departure from Feyenoord, he said: "Purely to develop myself as a footballer. After all this time it's good that I come to play in a different environment. New incentives are always good. All in all, I've been playing for Feyenoord for eleven years already. And I will never forget that. My heart is bleeding. I can honestly say that I had to shed some tears, but that's how things go in football. I will never forget Feyenoord and I am sure that the club will have a good season with the current selection and the new acquisitions."

Fer made his debut for the club, starting the whole game, in a 2–1 loss against Roda JC on 10 September 2011. In a follow–up match against ADO Den Haag, he set up FC Twente's third goal of the game, in a 5–2 win. When Fer started out at the club, he found himself placed on the substitute bench, due to the competition in the midfield position. It wasn't until on 26 October 2011 when Fer scored his first goal for FC Twente, and set up the club's second goal of the game, in a 4–2 win against SC Genemuiden in the third round of the KNVB Cup. He followed in the next three matches by scoring against PSV Eindhoven, Odense Boldklub and De Graafschap. However, Fer suffered a groin injury during a match against Fulham in the UEFA Europa League match on 1 December 2011 and was substituted at half time, as FC Twente won 1–0 to advance to the next round; and he missed three matches as a result. Fer made his return to the first team from injury, coming on as a 73rd-minute substitute against his former club, Feyenoord on 18 December 2011, as the club lost 3–2. During the match, he received jeers from supporters of the opposition team. As Fer began making improvements on his performances, he regained his first team place, playing in the centre–midfield position. On 29 January 2012, Fer scored his fifth goal of the season, in a 4–1 win against FC Groningen. His sixth goal of the season came on 19 February 2012 against Vitesse, as FC Twente won 4–1. In a match against PSV Eindhoven on 4 March 2012, he played an important role by setting up the club's third goal of the game and scored a goal for himself, in a 6–2 win. Fer later scored three more goals later in the 2011–12 season, coming against De Graafschap, Ajax and VVV-Venlo. At the end of the 2011–12 season, he went on to make thirty–nine appearances and scoring ten times in all competitions.

Ahead of the 2012–13 season, Fer was linked with a move to Portuguese club Benfica but he ended up staying at FC Twente. However, during a friendly match in a 5–0 win against FC Emmen on 14 July 2012, Fer received a straight red card and was suspended for one match as a result. Despite this, he scored twice in the second leg of the UEFA Europa League's second round, in a 5–0 win against Inter Turku to the club's advance to the next round. This was followed up by scoring in both legs against Mladá Boleslav, as FC Twente won 4–0 on aggregate. Fer then scored five goals between 18 August 2012 and 2 September 2012 against NAC Breda, NEC Nijmegen, Bursaspor (twice) and VVV-Venlo. However, he ruptured his knee while on international duty and was sidelined for four weeks, which was delayed further to November. His injury led the club asking for compensation to FIFA. It wasn't until on 18 November 2012 when Fer made his return from injury, coming on as a 77th-minute substitute, in a 1–1 draw against FC Utrecht. Following his return from injury, he continued to regain his first team place, playing in the centre midfield position. On 28 January 2013, it was announced that English side Everton of the Premier League had agreed a deal, reportedly worth £8.6 million, to sign Fer. However, the deal fell through when a medical revealed the player had a long-term knee injury and Everton wanted to negotiate a payment by appearances fee. Following this, Fer then set up two goals in two matches between 10 February 2013 and 16 February 2013 against PEC Zwolle and Willem II. This was followed up by captaining the club for the first time against SC Heerenveen and helped the side draw 1–1. He scored his tenth goal of the season, in a 3–0 win against FC Groningen on 17 March 2013. His eleventh goal of the season came on 5 May 2013, in a 1–1 draw against Heracles Almelo. Fer was featured in four matches in the play-offs spot for the UEFA Europa League next season, as FC Twente lost 3–2 against FC Utrecht in the final. Despite suffering another injury later in the 2012–13 season, he went on to make thirty–eight appearances and scoring eleven times in all competitions. On 25 April 2013, Fer announced his intention of leaving the club. By the time he departed FC Twente, Fer played 71 times for the club, scoring 21 goals over the next two seasons.

=== Norwich City ===
On 13 July 2013, Norwich City confirmed the signing of Fer on a four-year deal for an undisclosed fee believed to be in the region on £4.4 million. Upon joining the club, he was given a number ten shirt.

Fer made his debut for Norwich City, starting the whole game, in a 1–0 loss against Hull City on 24 August 2013. In a follow–up match, he scored his first goal for the club against Bury in the League Cup on 27 August 2013. Fer was awarded Man of the Match for an exceptional performance when he set up the only goal of the game, in a 1–0 home victory over Southampton on 31 August 2013. Fer continued his fine early form when he was awarded Norwich City's Player of the Month award and his fourth consecutive Man of the Match award after a 3–1 home defeat to Chelsea on 6 October 2013. Fer was involved in controversy in a 0–0 draw against Cardiff City on 26 October 2013 when teammate Alexander Tettey went down injured late in the match and Cardiff goalkeeper David Marshall sportingly put the ball out of play so Tettey could get treatment. However, during the distraction, Ricky van Wolfswinkel took a quick throw-in to Fer, who rolled the ball into the net. Despite the goal not technically being in violation of any rules, the referee disallowed the goal as he "had not blown his whistle"; players technically do not have to wait for the whistle to be blown to take a throw-in. Cardiff manager Malky Mackay criticised Fer's lack of sportsmanship. He confirmed on Match of the Day that the shot was completely intentional and had not expected such a reaction from the Cardiff players, who surrounded him and started shoving him around. Marshall also started to threaten Van Wolfswinkel. Fer scored the third goal in the club's 3–1 home win over West Ham United on 9 November 2013, and drew plaudits from the likes of Jamie Redknapp for his performance, stating stated his belief that he could become one of the stars of the league if he consistently plays as he did. Fer scored again in a 2–1 defeat against Newcastle United on 23 November 2013, a late header that only proved to be a consolation for the Canaries. During a 2–0 victory against West Bromwich Albion on 7 December 2013, he assisted Gary Hooper with a through ball that cut straight through the West Brom defence and then scored his third league goal for the club in, and celebrated by imitating a flying canary, resulting in him being named Man of the Match by Sky Sports for his performance. However, Fer was sent off against Crystal Palace on 1 January 2014 in the 82nd minute in a match which ended 1–1. After serving a one match suspension, Fer returned to the starting line–up against Everton, as the club lost 1–0 on 11 January 2014. However, he suffered a hamstring injury while training and was sidelined for a month. On 12 April 2014, Fer made his return to the starting line–up from injury and played 68 minutes before being substituted, in a 1–0 loss against Fulham. Despite Norwich City's relegation, he went on to make thirty–two appearances and scoring four times in all competitions.

Ahead of the 2014–15 season, Fer was linked a move away from Norwich City, as he was in "big demands" following his participation in the World Cup. But manager Neil Adams said Fer would not leave the club cheaply. Amid the transfer speculation, he made one appearances for Norwich City, coming on against Watford on 16 August 2014.

=== Queens Park Rangers ===
Following Norwich's relegation to the Championship, Fer moved to newly promoted Premier League team Queens Park Rangers, signing a three-year deal with the club for a reported fee of £8 million.

He made his debut for the Hoops away, starting a match and played 68 minutes before being substituted, in a 4–0 loss against Tottenham Hotspur on 24 August 2014. The next league match was his home debut when Sunderland were welcomed to Loftus Road, where Fer was named Man of the Match for his performance in the club's first league win and clean sheet of the season. Since joining the Hoops, he quickly became a first team regular, playing in the midfield position. Fer scored his first goal for the club against Leicester City, smashing in a close-range effort in a 3–2 home win on 29 November 2014. Seven days later on 6 December 2014, je was again on the score sheet, scoring his second goal with the opener for Queens Park Rangers in a 2–0 win over Burnley at home. On 1 January 2015, Fer scored the opening goal of the game, in a 1–1 draw against Swansea City. A month later on 10 February 2015, he scored his fourth goal for the club, in a 2–0 win against Sunderland, giving them their first win of 2015. However, Fer suffered a knee injury during the match that saw him substituted in the 75th minute and was sidelined for two months. It wasn't until on 25 April 2015 when he made his return to the first team, coming on as a 67th-minute substitute, in a 0–0 draw against West Ham United. In a follow–up match on 2 May 2015, Fer scored an equaliser against Liverpool at Anfield, only for the home side to score a late winner. On 16 May 2015, he scored his sixth goal of the season, in a 2–1 win against Newcastle United. Despite the 2014–15 season resulted in Queens Park Rangers' relegation, Fer went on to make thirty–one appearances and scoring six times in all competitions.

Ahead of the 2015–16 season, it was expected that Fer would be leaving the club following their relegation. Sunderland was interested in signing the player that Queens Park Rangers even announced the confirmation of the move on the club's website. However, he failed a medical due to his knee injury and stayed at Queens Park Rangers throughout the summer transfer window. Following this, Fer spent the first two months on the 2015–16 season on the sidelines, due to a knee injury. It wasn't until on 25 September 2015 when he made his first appearance of the season, coming on as a second-half substitute, in a 4–0 loss against rivals, Fulham. In a follow–up match against Bolton Wanderers, Fer scored his first goal of the season, in a 4–3 win. Following this, Fer became involved in a number of matches, which saw him in and out of the starting line–up. However, in a match against Middlesbrough on 20 November 2015, he received a straight red card in stoppage for handball, leading to a penalty and successfully converted by Grant Leadbitter, as the opposition team won 1–0. After serving a one match suspension, Fer returned to the starting line–up against Reading on 3 December 2015 and helped the club win 1–0. It wasn't until on 12 January 2016 when he scored his second goal of the season, in a 1–1 draw against Blackburn Rovers. In the January transfer window, Fer continued to be linked a move away from Queens Park Rangers. By the time he was loaned out to Swansea City, Fer made nineteen appearances and scoring two times in all competitions.

==== Swansea City (loan) ====
On 1 February 2016, Fer joined Premier League side Swansea City on loan for the remainder of the season after failing to make an impact under Jimmy Floyd Hasselbaink. However, his move came under criticism from Iwan Roberts, leading carertaker Alan Curtis defend the signing.

He made his debut for the club against Tottenham Hotspur on 28 February, coming on as a 75th-minute substitute, in a 2–1 loss. Fer then set up two goals in two matches between 5 and 12 March against Norwich City and AFC Bournemouth. Since joining Swansea City, he was involved in the first team for the rest of the 2015–16 season, playing in the midfield position. Despite missing one match, Fer went on to make eleven appearances in all competitions. Following this, the club began talks with the player over a permanent basis move.

=== Swansea City ===
Fer made his move to South Wales permanent on 5 July 2016 and signed a three–year contract with an undisclosed fee. Upon joining the club, he said: "I want to improve and get better. Last season I came into a team that had already played six months together and I had to fit in. But they made it very easy for me and I know the lads so for me [the aim] is to get better and show the Swansea fans what I've got in the locker."

Fer began his Premier League season with a winning goal in a 0–1 away victory at Burnley. He then scored two goals in two matches between 27 August 2016 and 11 September 2016 against Leicester City and Chelsea respectively. Three weeks later on 1 October 2016, Fer scored his fourth goal of the season, in a 2–1 loss against Liverpool, in what turned out to be Francesco Guidolin's last match as the club's manager. Since joining Swansea City, Fer continued to be involved in the first team, playing in the midfield position. On 26 November 2016, he scored twice for the club, in a 5–4 win against Crystal Palace. However, poor performance led Fer being dropped to the substitute bench in a number of matches towards the end of the year. By January, he regained his first team place under the new management of Paul Clement and produced good performances. At one point, Fer played in an unfamiliar right–back against AFC Bournemouth on 18 March 2017, as Swansea City lost 2–0. Once, however, the combination of poor performances and his own injury concern saw him placed on the substitute bench, but did help the club avoid relegation. At the end of the 2016–17 season, he went on to make thirty–seven appearances and scoring six times in all competitions.

At the start of the 2017–18 season, Fer continued to establish himself in the first team, playing in the midfield position. He then scored twice for Swansea City against Milton Keynes Dons in the first round of the League Cup, as the club won 4–1 to advance to the next round. This was followed up by setting up a goal for Tammy Abraham, in a 2–0 win against Crystal Palace. However, Fer found himself being disciplined on two occasions, including a red card against Wolverhampton Wanderers in the third round of the FA Cup on 6 January 2018. This was later rescinded after Swansea City's successful appeal. His third goal of the season came on 18 December 2017, in a 3–1 loss against Everton. By mid–November, he, once again, performed poorly in a number of matches that saw him placed on the substitute bench, but improved at times. This lasted until Fer suffered an achilles tendon injury during a 1–1 draw against Leicester City on 3 February 2018 and was substituted in the 36th minute. After the match, it was announced that the player would be out for the rest of the 2017–18 season. Despite his absence that saw the club ended up relegated at the end of the 2017–18 season, he went on to make twenty–six appearances and scoring three times in all competitions.

Ahead of the 2018–19 season, it was expected that Fer would be miss the start of the season. He was then given a captaincy role, succeeding Àngel Rangel, who left Swansea City in the summer. Fer made his first appearance of the season, coming on as a 75th-minute substitute, in a 1–0 win against Preston North End on 11 August 2018. A week later against Leeds United on 21 August 2018, he captained his first match, starting a match and played 74 minutes before being substituted, in a 2–2 draw. However, during a 2–1 win against Millwall on 1 September 2018, Fer suffered a groin injury and was substituted in the 35th minute. Four weeks later on 29 September 2018, he made his return from injury, coming on as a 71st-minute substitute, in a 3–0 win against Queens Park Rangers. Since returning from injury, Fer regained his first team place, playing in the midfield position, as well as, captain. He then scored his first goal of the season, in a 3–2 win against Brentford on 8 December 2018. A month later against Aston Villa in the third round of the FA Cup, Fer played a role when he set up two goals, in a 3–0 win. After the match, manager Graham Potter praised his performance, calling his own 'best game of season', while Wales Online agreed. In the January transfer window, Fer was linked with a move to Ligue 1 side Lille, Turkish side Fenerbahçe and Aston Villa. Ultimately, Swansea City put out a statement on their website that both Daniel James and Fer would be staying at the club after Swansea City put out a statement, regarding their future. However, during a 3–3 draw against Birmingham City on 29 January 2019, Fer suffered a hamstring injury and was substituted in the 35th minute. As a result, he was sidelined for two months. It wasn't until on 22 April 2019 when Fer made his return to the first team from injury, coming on as an 84th-minute substitute, in a 1–0 win against Ipswich Town. However, his return was short–lived when he suffered a knee injury that saw him out for the rest of the 2018–19 season. At the end of the 2018–19 season, Fer went on to make twenty–seven appearances and scoring once in all competitions.

Despite it was reported in November 2018 that Swansea City was in talks with Fer over a new contract, the club confirmed on 18 May 2019 that he will be released upon expiry of his contract.

=== Return to Feyenoord ===
Having left Feyenoord since 2011, Fer stated that he would love to return to the club one day, stating it's his dream to do that. Fer began training with Feyenoord on 8 July 2019, marking his return to the club for the first time in eight years. On 25 July 2019, Fer returned to Feyenoord, signing a one–year contract with the club. Upon joining Feyenoord, his return was welcomed by the club's supporters and said: "I think that for some fans, who found it very difficult that I had made that choice at the time, it is good to ask for forgiveness. They love the club and see a boy from the club, go to another club. But they welcomed me with a warm welcome, also during the practice matches I played. That gives me a boost, extra love for the club."

He made his second Feyenoord debut and started the whole game, in a 2–2 draw against Sparta Rotterdam in the opening game of the season. After resting for two matches, Fer returned to the first team, coming on as a second-half substitute, in a 1–1 draw against FC Utrecht on 18 August 2019. In a follow–up match against Hapoel Be'er Sheva, he scored his first goals since his return to the club, in a 3–0 win in the first leg of the UEFA Europa League's play–off round. In the return leg, Fer helped Feyenoord win 3–0 to help the club reach the group stage. Two weeks later on 15 September 2019, he scored his third goal of the season, in a 3–2 win against ADO Den Haag. Since rejoining the club, Fer re–established himself in the first team, playing in the midfield position. With Feyenoord's good performance in January, he expected things would get better, now that the club "is on the right track." Fer then scored two goals in two matches between 13 February 2020 and 16 February 2020 against SC Heerenveen and PEC Zwolle. He continued as a first-team regular, making thirty–five appearances and scoring five times in all competitions before the 2019–20 Eredivisie and the KNVB Cup, which Feyenoord reached the KNVB Cup Final, were halted in the Netherlands on 12 March due to the pandemic, which the season was eventually cancelled. Following this, Fer signed a two–year contract extension with the club, keeping him until 2022.

At the start of the 2020–21 season, Fer started in the first five league matches of the season, playing in the defensive midfield position. However, during a 1–1 draw match agaimst Sparta Rotterdam on 18 October 2020, he suffered a hamstring injury and was substituted in the 68th minute. After the match, Fer was sidelined between four and six weeks with the injury. Although he was expected to return in 2021, Fer eventually made his return to the first team from injury, coming on as a 76th-minute substitute, in a 3–0 win against VVV-Venlo on 13 December 2020. Since returning from injury, he continued to regain his first team place, playing in the defensive midfield position. This lasted until Fer suffered a calf injury that saw him miss one match. He made his return to the first team, starting a match and played 78 minutes before being substituted, in a 2–0 win against Fortuna Sittard on 4 April 2021. Following the absence of Steven Berghuis, Fer captained two times between 2 May 2021 and 9 May 2021 against ADO Den Haag and Ajax (during which, he missed a penalty). Fer helped Feyenoord qualify for the UEFA Europa Conference League next season after beating Sparta Rotterdam and FC Utrecht. At the end of the 2020–21 season, he went on to make twenty–nine appearances in all competitions.

== International career ==
=== Eligibility ===
Despite playing for the Netherlands on various youth levels, Fer was in doubt which country to represent, as he was eligible to play for both the Netherlands and Netherlands Antilles. In October 2008, Fer claimed he had not made a decision yet: "Personally I want to mean something for my island. That's why I'm still in doubt. My brain says it's better to choose for the Netherlands. Then you're assured of a big tournament every two years. But my heart is thinking of Curaçao. It would be fantastic to play a World Cup with Netherlands Antilles, it would give the islands an enormous boost. My roots are stronger than my urge to a career, I'm striving for a higher cause. I don't know yet, but my feelings to play for Netherlands Antilles are very strong." However, on 26 August 2009, Fer announced he made the final decision and chose to represent the Netherlands at international level.

==== Early youth teams ====
Fer represented all of the Netherlands' youth teams, first starting out with Netherlands U16 when he made his debut for the U16 national team, starting the whole game, in a 2–2 draw against Ukraine U16 on 19 October 2005. Fer scored his first goal for Netherlands U16, in a 1–0 win against Norway U16 on 28 January 2006. He later went on to make seven appearances and scoring once for the U16 national team.

After being called up to the Netherlands under-17 team, Fer made his U17 national team debut, starting the whole game, in a 2–0 win against Germany U17 on 21 September 2006. He then scored his first goals for Netherlands U17, in a 4–0 win against Qatar U17 four days later on 25 September 2006. In a follow–up match against Estonia on 25 October 2006, Fer scored his third goal for the U17 national team, in a 5–1 win. Two days later against Norway U17, he captained Netherlands U17 and helped the U17 national side win 1–0. On 22 March 2007, Fer scored his fourth goal for Netherlands U17, in a 5–0 win against Belarus U17. Three days later on 25 March, he had considerable success with the Netherlands under-17 team, when the U17 national team qualified for the UEFA European Under-17 Championship after beating Turkey U17 1–0. Fer was named captain of the Netherlands under-17 team for the 2007 UEFA European Under-17 Championship, held in Belgium. After a solid run through the qualifying rounds, without losing a single match, Netherlands U17 ended up in the group stage with host Belgium U17, Iceland U17 and England U17; where they started out poorly, in a 2–2 draw against Belgium U17, then came out victorious, in a 3–0 against Iceland U17, but finished on a third place in the group after losing 4–2 the final match against England U17 and then against Germany U17 in the play–offs. The Netherlands failed to qualify for the knock-out stage and missed out on a spot for the 2007 FIFA U-17 World Cup.

Shortly after the 2007 UEFA European Under-17 Championship, Fer was selected for the Netherlands under-19 team in September 2007 and made his debut for the national U19 team, in a 3–1 win against Germany U19 at the same month. On 24 May 2008, he scored his first goal for the U19 national team, in a 2–2 draw against Russia U19. Five months later on 14 October 2008, Fer scored his second goal for Netherlands U19, in a 2–1 loss against Germany U19. The team underachieved and failed to qualify for the 2008 UEFA European Under-19 Championship in Czech Republic and the 2009 UEFA European Under-19 Championship in Ukraine.

==== Netherlands U21 ====
In November 2008, Fer was called up to the Netherlands B squad for the first time. Despite protest from Feyenoord over the selection, he eventually withdrew due to illness. Fer made his unofficial debut for the Netherlands under-21 team on 31 March 2009. A temporary replacement team for the Netherlands, called the Netherlands B, played a friendly match against Italy, which ended in a 1–1 draw.

On 29 July 2009, the Netherlands U21 team began their 2011 UEFA European Under-21 Championship qualifying campaign with a friendly match against England and he was called up to the squad for the first time. Fer's official debut for the U19 national team came against England on 11 August 2009 when he was part of the starting line-up in a match which ended 0–0. Fer became a regular for the Netherlands U21's fixtures throughout the UEFA European Under-21 Championship qualification. However, he played in both legs of the UEFA European Under-21 Championship qualification play–offs against Ukraine U21, as the U21 national team were eliminated through away goals.

Following the UEFA European Under-21 Championship qualification play–offs, Fer was called up to the Netherlands U21 squad on 25 March 2011 and started the whole game, in a 3–1 against Germany U21. On 30 May 2011, he scored his first goal for Netherlands U21, in a 5–0 win against Albania U21. Four months later on 5 September 2011 against Luxembourg U21, Fer scored the third goal of the game and set up the first goal of the game, in a 4–0 win. On 15 February 2012, he was called up to the U21 national team despite being aged twenty–two at the time and started the whole game, in a 0–0 draw against Scotland U21 two weeks later on 29 February 2012. Fer then scored two goals in two matches for Netherlands U21, coming against Luxembourg U21 and Bulgaria U21 on 1 June 2012 and 5 June 2012 respectively. After a seven months absence, he was called up to the U21 national team squad and started the match, in a 2–1 win against Israel U21 on 21 March 2013.

In May 2013, Fer was called up to the Netherlands U21 squad for the UEFA European Under-21 Championship in Israel. In doing so, he became the record holder of playing the most matches for Netherlands U21, with twenty–seven appearances at the time. Fer started well in the tournament when he scored two goals in the first two matches in the group stage against Germany U21 and Russia U21. However, the U21 national team were eliminated in the semi–finals after losing 1–0 against Italy U21 on 15 June 2013. Following this, Fer made thirty–one appearances and scoring six times for Netherlands U21.

=== Senior team ===
On 8 August 2010, Fer was called up to the Netherlands squad for the first time. Three days later on 11 August 2010 against Ukraine, he made his debut for the national team, coming on as a 63rd-minute substitute, in a 1–1 draw. After a two years absence, Fer was called up to the Netherlands squad on 22 August 2012 and eventually making the final cut on 31 August 2012. He made his first appearances for the national team in two years, coming on as a 49th-minute substitute, in a 2–0 win against Turkey on 7 September 2012.

On 7 October 2013, Fer was called up to the Netherlands for the first time in over a year. He made his first appearance for the national team in over a year, coming on as an 80th-minute substitute, in an 8–1 win against Hungary on 11 October 2013. Four days later on 15 October 2013, Fer made his first start for Netherlands, starting the whole game, in a 2–0 win against Turkey. He later made two appearances between November 2013 and June 2014, coming against Colombia and Wales. In May 2014, Fer was included in the squad for the 2014 FIFA World Cup in Brazil. On 31 May, he made the cut to be included in the 23-man squad. Fer scored his first World Cup goal in the group match against Chile on 23 June, after coming on as a substitute. Despite making only one appearance in the tournament, Netherlands finished third place in the World Cup and for that, Fer received a bronze medal.

Following the end of the tournament, Fer later appeared four more matches by the end of the year, all of which were substitute. Since 2015, he was called up to the Netherlands squad but did not play.

== Personal life ==
Fer was raised Catholic: "In Zoetermeer we went to church every day. God gave me my football talent. I thank Him for that every day." On his right lower arm, he has a tattoo of the Christian cross with the text "In God I trust". Outside of football, Fer is a fan of rap music. He got separated in 2018 after four years of marriage. He began a new relationship with Angela, where she gave birth to a baby daughter, Castle Fleurella.

Throughout his football career, Fer campaigned against racism. In March 2015, three people were fined for racially abusing Fer on social media.

Fer has various nicknames. In his youth, he was nicknamed "De Uitsmijter" ("The Bouncer") by Feyenoord youth coach Jean-Paul van Gastel for his strong physical appearance. Other nicknames are "Lerra" and "Ferovic". Cor Pot, coach of the Netherlands under-21 national team, compared Fer with Patrick Vieira. According to Pot, both players show many similarities, on and off the field. He has also been compared to Frank Rijkaard.

== Career statistics ==
=== Club ===
As of match played 3 June 2023

Appearances and goals by club, season and competition
Club	Season	League			National cup		League cup		Continental		Other		Total	
Club	Season	Division	Apps	Goals	Apps	Goals	Apps	Goals	Apps	Goals	Apps	Goals	Apps	Goals
Feyenoord	2007–08	Eredivisie	13	1	3	0	—		0	0	—		16	1
Feyenoord	2008–09	Eredivisie	32	6	2	0	—		6 (Note: Appearances in UEFA Cup/UEFA Europa League)	0	2 (Note: Appearances in Eredivisie European play-offs)	0	42	6
Feyenoord	2009–10	Eredivisie	31	2	7	1	—		0	0	—		38	3
Feyenoord	2010–11	Eredivisie	23	3	1	0	—		2	1	—		26	4
Feyenoord	2011–12	Eredivisie	4	2	0	0	—		0	0	—		4	2
Feyenoord	Total		103	14	13	1	—		8	1	2	0	126	16
Twente	2011–12	Eredivisie	28	8	2	1	—		9	1	—		39	10
Twente	2012–13	Eredivisie	30	5	0	0	—		8	6	—		38	11
Twente	Total		58	13	2	1	—		17	7	—		77	21
Norwich City	2013–14	Premier League	29	3	0	0	3	1	—		—		32	4
Norwich City	2014–15	Championship	1	0	0	0	0	0	—		—		1	0
Norwich City	Total		30	3	0	0	3	1	—		—		33	4
Queens Park Rangers	2014–15	Premier League	29	6	1	0	1	0	—		—		31	6
Queens Park Rangers	2015–16	Championship	19	2	0	0	0	0	—		—		19	2
Queens Park Rangers	Total		48	8	1	0	1	0	—		—		50	8
Swansea City (loan)	2015–16	Premier League	11	0	—		—		—		—		11	0
Swansea City	2016–17	Premier League	34	6	1	0	2	0	—		—		37	6
Swansea City	2017–18	Premier League	20	1	3	0	3	2	—		—		26	3
Swansea City	2018–19	Championship	25	1	2	0	0	0	—		—		27	1
Swansea City	Total		90	8	6	0	5	2	—		—		101	10
Feyenoord	2019–20 (Note: Season aborted due to COVID-19 pandemic in the Netherlands)	Eredivisie	23	2	3	1	—		8	2	—		34	5
Feyenoord	2020–21	Eredivisie	25	0	2	0	—		0	0	2	0	29	0
Feyenoord	2021–22	Eredivisie	1	0	0	0	—		4 (Note: Appearances in UEFA Europa Conference League)	0	—		5	0
Feyenoord	Total		49	2	5	1	—		12	2	2	0	68	5
Alanyaspor	2021–22	Süper Lig	20	0	3	0	—		—		—		23	0
Alanyaspor	2022–23	Süper Lig	30	1	3	0	—		—		—		33	1
Alanyaspor	Total		50	1	6	0	—		—		—		56	1
Career total			428	49	33	3	9	3	37	10	4	0	511	65

=== International ===
National team	Year	Major competition			Friendlies		Total	
National team	Year	Tournament	Apps	Goals	Apps	Goals	Apps	Goals
Netherlands U21
Netherlands U21	2009	2011 U-21 Euro qualifiers	5	0	1	0	6	0
Netherlands U21	2010	2011 U-21 Euro qualifiers	3	0	0	0	3	0
Netherlands U21	2011	2013 U-21 Euro qualifiers	4	1	4	1	8	2
Netherlands U21	2012	2013 U-21 Euro qualifiers	3	2	2	0	5	2
Netherlands U21	2013	2013 U-21 Euro	4	2	2	0	6	2
Netherlands U21	Total		19	5	9	1	28	6
Netherlands	2010	—	0	0	1	0	1	0
Netherlands	2012	2014 WC qualifiers	1	0	0	0	1	0
Netherlands	2013	2014 WC qualifiers	2	0	0	0	2	0
Netherlands	2014	2014 World Cup	1	1	3	0	4	1
Netherlands	2014	Euro 2016 qualifiers	2	0	0	0	2	0
Netherlands	Total		6	1	5	0	11	1

Score and result list Netherlands' goal tally first.

List of international goals scored by Leroy Fer
No.	Date	Venue	Opponent	Score	Result	Competition
1	23 June 2014	Arena Corinthians, São Paulo, Brazil	Chile	1–0	2–0	2014 FIFA World Cup

== Honours ==
Feyenoord

- KNVB Cup: 2007–08

Al Nasr

- Qatar-UAE Super Cup: 2025-01

Individual

- Rotterdam Talent of the Year: 2008
