= Erencan Yardımcı =

Turkish footballer

Personal information
- Date of birth: 4 February 2002 (age 24)
- Place of birth: İzmit, Turkey
- Height: 1.88 m (6 ft 2 in)
- Position: Forward

Team information
- Current team: 1. FC Kaiserslautern; (on loan from TSG Hoffenheim)
- Number: 17

Youth career
- 2013–2014: Kocaelispor
- 2014: Yuvam İzmitspor
- 2014–2017: 41 Futbol Kulübü
- 2017–2019: Galatasaray

Senior career*
Years	Team	Apps	(Gls)
2019–2021	Galatasaray	0	(0)
2021–2024	Eyüpspor	13	(2)
2022–2023	→ Alanyaspor (loan)	17	(4)
2023–2024	→ Pendikspor (loan)	28	(6)
2024–	TSG Hoffenheim	8	(0)
2024–	TSG Hoffenheim II	2	(0)
2024–2025	→ Sturm Graz (loan)	8	(2)
2025–2026	→ Eintracht Braunschweig (loan)	31	(5)
2026–	→ 1. FC Kaiserslautern (loan)	0	(0)

International career^{‡}
2019	Turkey U17	5	(2)
2019–2020	Turkey U18	4	(0)
2022–2024	Turkey U21	13	(6)
- * Club domestic league appearances and goals as of 18 May 2026 ‡ National team caps and goals as of 15 October 2024

Erencan Yardımcı (born 4 February 2002) is a Turkish professional footballer who plays as a forward for 2. Bundesliga club 1. FC Kaiserslautern, on loan from TSG Hoffenheim.

== Club career ==
In July 2019, Yardımcı signed his first professional contract with Galatasaray. He made his professional debut for Galatasaray in a 1–1 UEFA Champions League tie with Club Brugge on 26 November 2019.

He transferred to Eyüpspor in 2021, and helped them get promoted into the TFF First League for the 2020–21 season. He joined Alanyaspor on loan in the Süper Lig for the second half of the 2021–22 season starting 6 January 2022.

On 31 August 2024, Yardımcı signed with TSG Hoffenheim in Germany and was immediately loaned to Austrian club Sturm Graz. On 3 January 2025, Hoffenheim terminated the loan early. On 19 July 2025, he moved on a new loan to Eintracht Braunschweig in 2. Bundesliga. On 18 July 2026, Yardımcı was loaned by 1. FC Kaiserslautern.

== International career ==
Yardımcı is a youth international for Turkey, having played for the Turkey U17s and U18s.

== Career statistics ==
=== Club ===
As of match played 12 April 2025

Appearances and goals by club, season and competition
Club	Season	League			National cup (Note: Includes Turkish Cup, Austrian Cup)		Europe		Total	
Club	Season	Division	Apps	Goals	Apps	Goals	Apps	Goals	Apps	Goals
Galatasaray	2019–20	Süper Lig	0	0	0	0	1 (Note: Appearance(s) in UEFA Champions League)	0	1	0
Eyüpspor	2020–21	TFF 2. Lig	6	2	0	0	—		6	2
Eyüpspor	2021–22	TFF 2. Lig	7	0	2	2	—		9	2
Eyüpspor	Total		13	2	2	2	—		15	4
Alanyaspor (loan)	2021–22	Süper Lig	3	1	1	0	—		4	1
Alanyaspor (loan)	2022–23	Süper Lig	14	3	0	0	—		14	3
Alanyaspor (loan)	Total		17	4	1	0	—		18	4
Pendikspor (loan)	2023–24	Süper Lig	28	6	0	0	—		28	6
1899 Hoffenheim	2024–25	Bundesliga	7	0	0	0	0	0	7	0
Sturm Graz (loan)	2024–25	Austrian Bundesliga	8	2	1	1	5	0	14	3
Career total			73	14	4	3	6	0	83	17

== Honours ==
Sturm Graz

- Austrian Bundesliga: 2024–25
