= Yusuf Özdemir =

Turkish footballer (born 2001)

Personal information
- Date of birth: 10 January 2001 (age 25)
- Place of birth: Bahçelievler, Turkey
- Height: 1.77 m (5 ft 10 in)
- Position: Midfielder

Team information
- Current team: Alanyaspor
- Number: 88

Youth career
- 2013–2017: Güngörenspor
- 2017–2020: Alanyaspor

Senior career*
Years	Team	Apps	(Gls)
2020–	Alanyaspor	104	(10)
2022	→ İnegölspor (loan)	14	(2)
- * Club domestic league appearances and goals as of 10 June 2026

Yusuf Özdemir (born 10 January 2001) is a Turkish professional footballer who plays as a midfielder for Alanyaspor.

== Professional career ==
Özdemir is a product of the youth academies of Güngörenspor and Alanyaspor. He signed his first professional contract with Alanyaspor in 2020. He made his professional debut with Alanyaspor in a 1–0 Süper Lig win over MKE Ankaragücü on 15 May 2021. On 27 January 2022, he joined İnegölspor on loan for the second half of the 2021-22 season.

On 13 November 2025, Özdemir was banned from playing for 9 months for his involvement in the 2025 Turkish football betting scandal.

== Playing style ==
Usually plays as a left midfielder, but can also play as left-back or winger.
