= Efkan Bekiroğlu =

German footballer

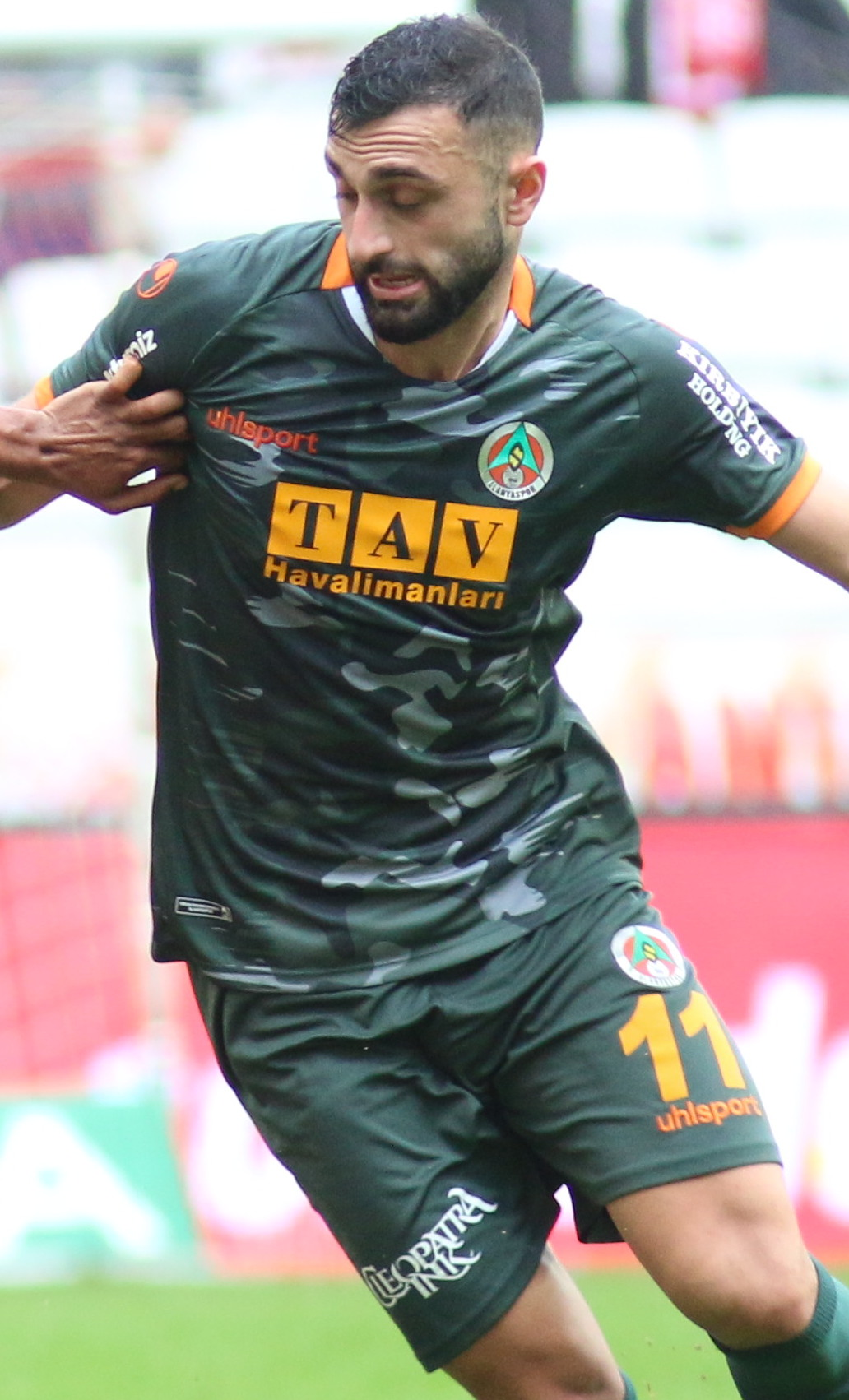

Personal information
- Full name: Efkan Bekiroğlu
- Date of birth: 14 September 1995 (age 31)
- Place of birth: Dachau, Germany
- Height: 1.85 m (6 ft 1 in)
- Position: Midfielder

Team information
- Current team: Göztepe
- Number: 10

Youth career
- ASV Dachau
- 1860 Munich
- –2013: SC Fürstenfeldbruck

Senior career*
Years	Team	Apps	(Gls)
2013–2014	FC Phönix München	27	(16)
2014–2015	FC Unterföhring	33	(21)
2015–2018	FC Augsburg II	85	(30)
2018–2020	1860 Munich	57	(13)
2020–2023	Alanyaspor	79	(9)
2023–2025	Ankaragücü	30	(9)
2025	→ Sivasspor (loan)	14	(2)
2025–	Göztepe	26	(4)
- * Club domestic league appearances and goals as of 17 August 2026

Efkan Bekiroğlu (born 14 September 1995) is a German professional footballer who plays as a midfielder for Süper Lig club Göztepe.

== Career ==
Bekiroğlu began his footballing career with the semi-pro sides FC Phönix München and FC Unterföhring in his native Germany. From there, he moved to the reserve side FC Augsburg II in the Regionalliga, and earned a move to 1860 Munich in 2018 in the 3. Liga. In the summer of 2020, he transferred to Alanyaspor in the Turkish Süper Lig.

On 11 July 2023 he signed with Süper Lig club Ankaragücü.

== Career statistics ==
As of match played on 26 May 2024

Club statistics
Club	Season	League			National Cup		Continental		Other		Total	
Club	Season	Division	Apps	Goals	Apps	Goals	Apps	Goals	Apps	Goals	Apps	Goals
FC Unterföhring	2014–15	Bayernliga	33	21	0	0	—		—		33	21
FC Augsburg II	2015–16	Regionalliga	24	9	—		—		2 (Note: Appearances in 2015–16 Regionalliga relegation play-offs)	0	26	9
FC Augsburg II	2016–17	Regionalliga	28	10	—		—		—		28	10
FC Augsburg II	2017–18	Regionalliga	33	11	0	0	—		—		33	11
FC Augsburg II	Total		85	30	0	0	0	0	2	0	87	30
1860 Munich	2018–19	3. Liga	29	3	0	0	—		5 (Note: Appearances in the Verbandspokal)	4	34	7
1860 Munich	2019–20	3. Liga	28	10	0	0	—		1	0	29	10
1860 Munich	Total		57	13	0	0	0	0	6	4	63	17
Alanyaspor	2020–21	Süper Lig	23	2	3	0	—		—		26	2
Alanyaspor	2021–22	Süper Lig	31	3	5	0	—		—		36	3
Alanyaspor	2022–23	Süper Lig	0	0	2	0	—		—		2	0
Alanyaspor	Total		79	9	10	0	0	0	0	0	89	9
Ankaragücü	2023–24	Süper Lig	30	9	5	1	—		—		35	10
Career totals			284	82	15	1	0	0	8	4	307	87

== Personal life ==
Born in Germany, is of Turkish descent.
