= Fatih Aksoy =

Turkish footballer (born 1997)

Personal information
- Full name: Fatih Aksoy
- Date of birth: 6 November 1997 (age 29)
- Place of birth: Üsküdar, Istanbul, Turkey
- Height: 1.89 m (6 ft 2 in)
- Position: Centre-back

Team information
- Current team: Alanyaspor
- Number: 20

Youth career
- 2008–2011: Marmara Üniversitesi Spor
- 2011–2012: Anadoluhisarı İdman Yurdu
- 2012–2013: Karabekirspor
- 2013–2017: Beşiktaş

Senior career*
Years	Team	Apps	(Gls)
2017–2020	Beşiktaş	5	(0)
2019–2020	→ Sivasspor (loan)	31	(1)
2020–	Alanyaspor	148	(3)

International career^{‡}
2018–	Turkey U20	3	(0)
- * Club domestic league appearances and goals as of 10 June 2026 ‡ National team caps and goals as of 25 August 2020

Fatih Aksoy (born 6 November 1997) is a Turkish professional footballer who plays as a centre-back for Süper Lig club Alanyaspor.

== Club career ==
Fatih made his professional debut for Beşiktaş in a 2–1 Turkish Cup win over Kayserispor on 14 December 2016. He made his Süper Lig debut with Beşiktaş in a 0–0 draw against Yeni Malatyaspor on 25 November 2017.

== International career ==
Fatih is a youth international for Turkey, and represented them at the 2018 Toulon Tournament.
