= İsmail Zehir =

Turkish footballer

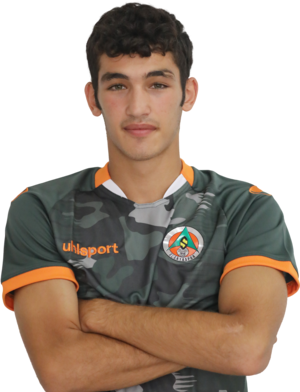

Personal information
- Date of birth: 29 June 2003 (age 23)
- Place of birth: Pendik, Turkey
- Position: Midfielder

Team information
- Current team: 68 Aksaray Belediyespor
- Number: 6

Youth career
- 2013–2018: Kartalspor
- 2018–2021: Galatasaray
- 2021–2022: Alanyaspor

Senior career*
Years	Team	Apps	(Gls)
2022–2025	Alanyaspor	1	(0)
2023	→ Batman Petrolspor (loan)	6	(0)
2023–2024	→ Düzcespor (loan)	26	(1)
2024–2025	→ İnegölspor (loan)	26	(0)
2025–	68 Aksaray Belediyespor	10	(0)

International career^{‡}
2017	Turkey U15	2	(0)
2019	Turkey U16	8	(0)
2019–2020	Turkey U17	12	(3)
2021–2022	Turkey U19	11	(0)
- * Club domestic league appearances and goals as of 26 October 2025 ‡ National team caps and goals as of 04:20, 10 September 2022 (UTC)

İsmail Zehir (born 29 June 2003) is a Turkish professional footballer who plays as a midfielder for TFF 2. Lig club 68 Aksaray Belediyespor.

== Club career ==
Zehir is a youth product of the academies of Kartalspor and Galatasaray. He transferred to Alanyaspor on a 5-year contract on 15 August 2021 as part of a deal that sent Berkan Kutlu the other way. He made his professional and Süper Lig debut with Alanyaspor as a late substitute in a 1–0 win over Fatih Karagümrük on 22 May 2022.

On 14 January 2023, Zehir joined Batman Petrolspor on loan.

== International career ==
Zehir is a youth international for Turkey, having most recently played for the Turkey U19s.
