= Efecan Karaca =

Turkish footballer

Personal information
- Full name: Efecan Karaca
- Date of birth: 16 November 1989 (age 36)
- Place of birth: Fatih, Turkey
- Height: 1.66 m (5 ft 5 in)
- Position: Midfielder

Team information
- Current team: Sarıyer
- Number: 10

Youth career
- 2001–2010: Galatasaray

Senior career*
Years	Team	Apps	(Gls)
2007–2009	Galatasaray	15	(1)
2008–2009	→ Gaziantepspor (loan)	38	(2)
2009–2010	Kartalspor	29	(2)
2010–2011	Adanaspor	14	(2)
2011	Adana Demirspor	12	(1)
2011–2012	Sarıyer	25	(6)
2012–2013	Kartalspor	26	(2)
2013–2026	Alanyaspor	394	(37)
2026–	Sarıyer	14	(1)

International career^{‡}
2006	Turkey U18	2	(0)
2007	Turkey U19	3	(0)
2019–2021	Turkey	8	(1)
- * Club domestic league appearances and goals as of 6 November 2026 ‡ National team caps and goals as of 26 March 2019

Efecan Karaca (born 16 November 1989) is a Turkish footballer who plays for TFF 1. Lig club Sarıyer. He is a product of the Galatasaray youth academy.

Efecan has represented the Turkish Football Federation at the U18 and U19 levels. On 25 March 2019, he made a debut in the national senior team in a 4–0 home win against Moldova.

== Career statistics ==
As of match played 24 May 2024

Appearances and goals by club, season and competition
Club	Season	League			Cup		Europe		Other		Total	
Club	Season	Division	Apps	Goals	Apps	Goals	Apps	Goals	Apps	Goals	Apps	Goals
Gaziantepspor (loan) (loan)	2008–09	1. Lig	31	2	6	0	—		—		37	2
Kartalspor	2009–10	1. Lig	29	2	0	0	—		—		29	2
Adanaspor	2010–11	1. Lig	14	0	0	0	—		—		14	0
Adana Demirspor	2012–13	2. Lig	12	1	—		—		0	0	12	1
Sarıyer	2011–12	2. Lig	24	6	0	0	—		—		24	6
Kartalspor	2012–13	1. Lig	26	2	1	0	—		—		27	2
Alanyaspor	2013–14	2. Lig	33	5	1	0	—		5	0	39	5
Alanyaspor	2014–15	1. Lig	29	6	0	0	—		2	0	31	6
Alanyaspor	2015–16	1. Lig	29	2	0	0	—		0	0	29	2
Alanyaspor	2016–17	Süper Lig	24	1	1	0	—		—		25	1
Alanyaspor	2017–18	Süper Lig	34	5	1	0	—		—		35	5
Alanyaspor	2018–19	Süper Lig	34	2	3	0	—		—		37	2
Alanyaspor	2019–20	Süper Lig	33	2	8	0	—		—		41	2
Alanyaspor	2020–21	Süper Lig	29	2	2	0	1	0	—		32	2
Alanyaspor	2021–22	Süper Lig	34	5	5	1	—		—		39	6
Alanyaspor	2022–23	Süper Lig	28	5	3	0	—		—		31	5
Alanyaspor	2023–24	Süper Lig	37	2	1	0	—		—		38	2
Alanyaspor	Total		344	37	25	1	1	0	7	0	377	38
Career total			487	50	32	1	1	0	7	0	527	51

== International goals ==
Scores and results list Turkey's goal tally first.

No.	Date	Venue	Opponent	Score	Result	Competition
1.	7 October 2020	RheinEnergieStadion, Cologne, Germany	Germany	2–2	3–3	Friendly
