= Emre Bekir =

Turkish professional footballer

Personal information
- Full name: Emre Bekir
- Date of birth: 17 August 1998 (age 28)
- Place of birth: Ondokuzmayıs, Turkey
- Height: 1.82 m (6 ft 0 in)
- Position: Left-back

Team information
- Current team: Fethiyespor
- Number: 61

Youth career
- 2008–2011: Karaağaçspor
- 2011–2019: Alanyaspor

Senior career*
Years	Team	Apps	(Gls)
2019–2025	Alanyaspor	1	(0)
2019	→ Zemplín Michalovce (loan)	0	(0)
2020	→ Fethiyespor (loan)	7	(0)
2020–2021	→ Serik Belediyespor (loan)	33	(4)
2021–2022	→ Düzcespor (loan)	33	(2)
2022–2023	→ İskenderunspor (loan)	11	(0)
2023	→ Fethiyespor (loan)	5	(0)
2024–2025	→ Fethiyespor (loan)	23	(1)
2025–	Fethiyespor	3	(0)
- * Club domestic league appearances and goals as of 7 September 2025

Emre Bekir (born 17 August 1998) is a Turkish professional footballer who plays as a left-back for TFF 2. Lig club Fethiyespor.

== Professional career ==
Bekir made his professional debut with Alanyaspor in a 1–1 tie İstanbul Başakşehir on 27 May 2019.

In August 2019, Bekir left for a loan spell with Zemplín Michalovce, of Slovak Fortuna liga. Bekir, however, only made a single appearance in Slovnaft Cup against lower (5th division) club FK Krásnohorské Podhradie. However, he only played the first half of the game, playing as a left back. He was replaced by Dimitris Popovits. In January 2020, he had returned to Turkish Alanyaspor. On 15 January 2020, he then moved to TFF Third League club Fethiyespor for the rest of the season.

On 4 January 2023, Bekir returned to Fethiyespor, now in TFF Second League.
