= Umut Güneş =

Turkish footballer (born 2000)

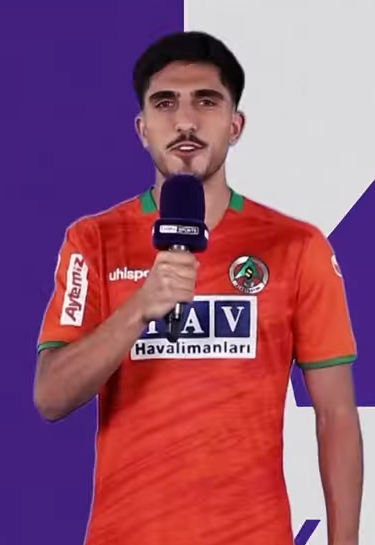
- Güneş in 2021

Personal information
- Full name: Umut Güneş
- Date of birth: 16 March 2000 (age 26)
- Place of birth: Albstadt, Germany
- Height: 1.77 m (5 ft 10 in)
- Position: Midfielder

Team information
- Current team: İstanbul Başakşehir
- Number: 20

Youth career
- 2014–2018: VfB Stuttgart

Senior career*
Years	Team	Apps	(Gls)
2018–2019	VfB Stuttgart II	4	(0)
2019–2023	Alanyaspor	82	(4)
2023–2025	Trabzonspor	29	(0)
2025–	İstanbul Başakşehir	40	(1)

International career
2016–2017	Turkey U17	13	(3)
2018–2019	Turkey U19	13	(0)
2019	Turkey U20	1	(0)
2019–2022	Turkey U21	11	(0)
- * Club domestic league appearances and goals as of 1 June 2026

Umut Güneş (born 16 March 2000) is a professional footballer who plays as a midfielder for Süper Lig club İstanbul Başakşehir. Born in Germany, he has represented Turkey at youth level.

== Professional career ==
On 15 August 2019, Güneş signed a professional contract with Alanyaspor. Güneş made his professional debut for Alanyaspor in a 5-0 Süper Lig win over MKE Ankaragücü on 30 November 2019.
