= Yusuf Karagöz =

Turkish footballer (born 1999)

Personal information
- Date of birth: 5 October 1999 (age 27)
- Place of birth: İskenderun, Turkey
- Height: 1.95 m (6 ft 5 in)
- Position: Goalkeeper

Team information
- Current team: Menemen (on loan from Alanyaspor)
- Number: 99

Youth career
- 2010–2011: İkizler
- 2011–2015: Antalya Özerspor
- 2015–2018: Alanyaspor

Senior career*
Years	Team	Apps	(Gls)
2018–	Alanyaspor	14	(0)
2019	→ Erzinspor (loan)	0	(0)
2020	→ Batman Petrolspor (loan)	0	(0)
2020–2021	→ Edirnespor (loan)	11	(0)
2025–	→ Menemen (loan)	9	(0)
- * Club domestic league appearances and goals as of 9 November 2025

Yusuf Karagöz (born 5 October 1999) is a Turkish professional footballer who plays as a goalkeeper for the TFF 2. Lig club Menemen on loan from Alanyaspor.

== Club career ==
Karagöz was born in İskenderun, and moved to Alanya in 2008. He joined the youth academy of İkizler in 2010, and from there joined the academies of Antalya Özerspor and Alanyaspor. He signed his first professional contract with Alanyaspor in 2018. He started his senior career with successive loans to Erzinspor, Batman Petrolspor and Edirnespor in the TFF Third League, before returning to Alanyaspor as the reserve goalkeeper. He made his professional debut with Alanyaspor in a 1–0 Süper Lig loss to Sivasspor on 25 April 2022.
