= Furkan Bayır =

Turkish footballer (born 2000)

Personal information
- Date of birth: 9 February 2000 (age 26)
- Place of birth: İzmir, Turkey
- Height: 1.87 m (6 ft 2 in)
- Position: Centre-back

Team information
- Current team: Göztepe
- Number: 23

Senior career*
Years	Team	Apps	(Gls)
2017–2021	Menemenspor	26	(1)
2021–2025	Alanyaspor	82	(1)
2021	→ Menemenspor (loan)	13	(1)
2025–	Göztepe	19	(1)

International career^{‡}
2021–2022	Turkey U21	4	(1)
- * Club domestic league appearances and goals as of 10 June 2026 ‡ National team caps and goals as of 10 June 2022

Furkan Bayır (born 9 February 2000) is a Turkish professional footballer who plays as a centre-back for Süper Lig club Göztepe.

== Club career ==
Bayır began his senior career with Menemenspor, and moved to Alanyaspor on 2 January 2021 - he was loaned back to Menemenspor for the remainder of the 2020–21 season. He made his professional debut with Alanyaspor in a 1–1 Süper Lig tie with İstanbul Başakşehir on 8 January 2022.

On 28 January 2025, Bayır signed with Göztepe for three-and-a-half years, with an option for one more season.

== International career ==
Bayır is a youth international for Turkey, having been called up to represent the Turkey U21s in June 2021.
