= 2022–23 Konyaspor season =

Konyaspor
2022–23 season
- President: Fatih Özgökçen
- Head coach: İlhan Palut (until 17 January); Aleksandar Stanojević (from 17 January)
- Stadium: Konya Metropolitan Municipality Stadium
- Süper Lig: 8th
- Turkish Cup: Round of 16
- UEFA Europa Conference League: Third qualifying round
- Top goalscorer: League: Mame Biram Diouf (9); All: Mame Biram Diouf (10)
colours	Away colours	Third colours

The 2022–23 season was the 101st season in the existence of Konyaspor and the club's 10th consecutive season in the top flight of Turkish football. In addition to the domestic league, Konyaspor participated in this season's edition of the Turkish Cup and the UEFA Europa Conference League. The season covers the period from 1 July 2022 to 30 June 2023.

== Players ==
=== First-team squad ===
As of 14 February 2023

Note: Flags indicate national team as defined under FIFA eligibility rules; some limited exceptions apply. Players may hold more than one non-FIFA nationality.

No.	Pos.	Nation	Player
1	GK	TUR	Erhan Erentürk
3	DF	TUR	Yasir Subaşı
4	DF	TUR	Adil Demirbağ
5	DF	TUR	Uğurcan Yazğılı
9	FW	TUR	Muhammet Demir
10	MF	CRO	Domagoj Pavičić
11	FW	CRO	Robert Murić
12	DF	BRA	Guilherme
13	GK	BIH	Ibrahim Šehić
14	MF	TUR	Soner Dikmen
15	DF	CRC	Francisco Calvo
19	FW	AZE	Mahir Emreli (on loan from Dinamo Zagreb)
20	DF	TUR	Kahraman Demirtaş

No.	Pos.	Nation	Player
22	DF	TUR	Ahmet Oğuz
23	MF	ALB	Endri Çekiçi
29	FW	ENG	Uche Ikpeazu
32	MF	GRE	Andreas Bouchalakis
35	MF	TUR	Oğulcan Ülgün
42	FW	TUR	Mehmet Ali Büyüksayar
64	GK	TUR	Mehmet Erdoğan
77	MF	POL	Konrad Michalak
80	MF	ANG	Bruno Paz
88	FW	TUR	Ahmet Karademir
90	DF	TUR	Cebrail Karayel
99	FW	SEN	Mame Biram Diouf
—	FW	COL	Marlos Moreno (on loan from Troyes)

=== Out on loan ===
Note: Flags indicate national team as defined under FIFA eligibility rules; some limited exceptions apply. Players may hold more than one non-FIFA nationality.

No.	Pos.	Nation	Player
—	GK	TUR	Ozan Can Oruç (at 1922 Konyaspor until 30 June 2023)
—	DF	TUR	Yaşar Kavas (at 1922 Konyaspor until 30 June 2023)
—	DF	TUR	Nafican Yardımcı (at 1461 Trabzon until 30 June 2023)
—	MF	TUR	Adem Eren Kabak (at Şanlıurfaspor until 30 June 2023)
—	MF	TUR	İzzet Karaboğa (at 1922 Konyaspor until 30 June 2023)

No.	Pos.	Nation	Player
—	MF	TUR	Ali Karakaya (at 1922 Konyaspor until 30 June 2023)
—	MF	TUR	Emre Pehlivan (at 1922 Konyaspor until 30 June 2023)
—	FW	TUR	Hüseyin Biber (at 1922 Konyaspor until 30 June 2023)
—	FW	ALB	Sokol Cikalleshi (at Khaleej until 30 June 2023)
—	FW	TUR	Hüseyin Mert Uyanıker (at 1922 Konyaspor until 30 June 2023)

== Pre-season and friendlies ==
Win Draw Loss Fixtures

15 July 2022 Friendly	İstanbul Başakşehir (Turkey)	1–0	(Turkey) Konyaspor	Istanbul
18:00 TRT (UTC+3)	Crivelli 62'			Stadium: Fatih Terim Stadium

25 September 2022 Friendly	Konyaspor (Turkey)	4–1	(Turkey) Adanaspor	Selçuklu
14:00 TRT (UTC+3)	Paz 17'; Murić 23'; Diouf 39'; Demirtaş 47'		Mollaoğlu 82'	Stadium: Kayacık Tesisleri

29 November 2022 Friendly	Željezničar (Bosnia and Herzegovina)	1–2	(Turkey) Konyaspor	Sarajevo, Bosnia and Herzegovina
18:00 CET (UTC+1)	Hajdarević 21'	Report	Ikpeazu 9'; Pavičić 11'	Stadium: Stadion Grbavica

13 December 2022 Friendly	Ankaragücü (Turkey)	0–1	(Turkey) Konyaspor	Belek
14:00 TRT (UTC+3)			Hadžiahmetović 84' (pen.)	Stadium: Cornelia Sportcomplex Pitch 1

21 February 2023 Friendly	Konyaspor (Turkey)	5–0	(Turkey) Afyonspor	Konya
15:00 TRT (UTC+3)	Demirbağ 14'; Michalak 40'; Diouf 56', 58'; Murić 85'	Report		Stadium: Konya Metropolitan Municipality Stadium

== Competitions ==
=== Overall record ===
Competition	First match	Last match	Starting round	Final position	Record							
Competition	First match	Last match	Starting round	Final position	Pld	W	D	L	GF	GA	GD	Win %
Süper Lig	8 August 2022		Matchday 1	8th	36	12	15	9	49	41	+8	33.33
Turkish Cup	22 December 2022	19 January 2023	Fifth round	Round of 16	2	1	1	0	4	3	+1	50.00
UEFA Europa Conference League	21 July 2022	11 August 2022	Second qualifying round	Third qualifying round	4	2	1	1	8	5	+3	50.00
Total					42	15	17	10	61	49	+12	35.71

Source: Soccerway

=== Süper Lig ===
==== League table ====
Pos	Team	Pld	W	D	L	GF	GA	GD	Pts
6	Trabzonspor	36	17	6	13	64	54	+10	57
7	Fatih Karagümrük	36	13	12	11	75	63	+12	51
8	Konyaspor	36	12	15	9	49	41	+8	51
9	Kayserispor	36	15	5	16	55	61	−6	47 (Note: Reduction of 3 points by decision of the Turkish Federation.)
10	Kasımpaşa	36	12	7	17	45	61	−16	43

Source: Süper Lig
Rules for classification: 1) Points; 2) Head-to-head points; 3) Head-to-head goal difference; 4) Head-to-head goals scored; 5) Goal difference; 6) Goals scored; 7) Play-off.

==== Results summary ====
Overall								Home						Away					
Pld	W	D	L	GF	GA	GD	Pts	W	D	L	GF	GA	GD	W	D	L	GF	GA	GD
36	12	15	9	49	41	+8	51	5	8	5	18	18	0	7	7	4	31	23	+8

Source: Spor Toto Süper Lig

==== Results by round ====
Round	1	2	3	4	5	6	7	8	9	10	11	12	13	14	15	16	17	18	19	20	21	22	23	24	25	26	27	28	29	30	31	32	33	34	35	36	37	38
Ground	A	H	A	H	A	H	A	H	A	H	A	H	A	A	H		H	A	H	H	A	H	A	H	A	H	A	H	A	H	A	H	H	A		A	H	A
Result	D	D	W	W	W	W	L	W	D	L	D	D	D	W	D	B	D	D	L	L	L	L	L	D	W	W	D	D	W	L	W	W	D	W	B	L	D	D
Position	11	12	10	4	2	1	5	3	3	5	6	7	8	4	6	7	7	7	7	7	8	8	8	9	8	8	8	8	8	9	8	7	8	6	7	7	7	8

Source: Spor Toto Süper Lig
A = Away; H = Home; B = Bye; W = Win; D = Draw; L = Loss

==== Matches ====
The league schedule was released on 4 July.

8 August 2022 1	Ankaragücü	0–0	Konyaspor	Ankara
21:45 TRT (UTC+3)	Ceylan (yellow card) 90+4'	Report		Stadium: Eryaman Stadium; Attendance: 12,977; Referee: Bahattin Şimşek

15 August 2022 2	Konyaspor	0–0	İstanbul Başakşehir	Eskişehir
19:15 TRT (UTC+3)	Calvo (yellow card) 58'	Report	Tekdemir (yellow card) 62'; Şahiner (yellow card) 73'; Biglia (yellow card) 73'	Stadium: New Eskişehir Stadium; Attendance: 2,666; Referee: Sarper Barış Saka

22 August 2022 3	İstanbulspor	0–4	Konyaspor	Istanbul
19:15 TRT (UTC+3)	Ologo (yellow card) 68'	Report	Çekiçi 29'; Demirbağ (yellow card) 40'; Demir 44' (pen.); Oğuz (yellow card) 45+1'; Hadžiahmetović (yellow card) 55'; Yeşil 56' (o.g.); Guilherme 69' (pen.)	Stadium: Necmi Kadıoğlu Stadium; Attendance: 373; Referee: Burak Şeker

29 August 2022 4	Konyaspor	1–0	Fenerbahçe	Eskişehir
19:15 TRT (UTC+3)	Demirbağ (yellow card) 24' (yellow-red card) 54'; Demir 66'; Calvo (yellow card) 89'; Dikmen (yellow card) 90+4'	Report	Valencia (red card) 22'	Stadium: New Eskişehir Stadium; Attendance: 14,172; Referee: Arda Kardeşler

3 September 2022 5	Giresunspor	0–1	Konyaspor	Giresun
21:45 TRT (UTC+3)	Serginho (yellow card) 27'; Savićević (yellow card) 90+3'; Arias (yellow card) 90+7'	Report	Demir 51'	Stadium: Çotanak Sports Complex; Referee: Volkan Bayarslan

10 September 2022 6	Konyaspor	1–0	Hatayspor	Eskişehir
17:00 TRT (UTC+3)	Bytyqi (yellow card) 33'; Paz 66'	Report	Çörekçi (yellow card) 33'	Stadium: New Eskişehir Stadium; Attendance: 1,625; Referee: Tugay Kaan Numanoğlu

16 September 2022 7	Galatasaray	2–1	Konyaspor	Istanbul
20:00 TRT (UTC+3)	Oliveira 1'; Aktürkoğlu (yellow card) 21'; Calvo 82' (o.g.); Muslera (yellow card) 89'; Icardi (yellow card) 89'; Midtsjø (yellow card) 90+9'	Report	Çekiçi 15'; Calvo (yellow card) 68'; Ülgün (yellow card) 84'; Šehić (yellow card) 86' (yellow-red card) 89'	Stadium: Nef Stadium; Attendance: 46,647; Referee: Abdulkadir Bitigen

2 October 2022 8	Konyaspor	1–0	Ümraniyespor	Konya
17:00 TRT (UTC+3)	Demir 45+3' (yellow card) 45+4'; Bytyqi (yellow card) 83'; Guilherme (yellow card) 83'	Report	Ayık (yellow card) 90+4'	Stadium: Konya Metropolitan Municipality Stadium; Attendance: 12,456; Referee: Mustafa Kürşad Filiz

8 October 2022 9	Antalyaspor	1–1	Konyaspor	Antalya
17:00 TRT (UTC+3)	Fernando 51', (yellow card) 82'; Luiz Adriano (yellow card) 63'; Gümüş (yellow card) 65'; Vural (yellow card) 90+6'	Report	Calvo (yellow card) 30', (goal) 90+6'; Murić (yellow card) 55'; Demirbağ (yellow card) 82'; Ülgün (yellow card) 87'	Stadium: Antalya Stadium; Attendance: 8,826; Referee: Mert Güzenge

15 October 2022 10	Konyaspor	0–1	Gaziantep	Konya
20:00 TRT (UTC+3)	Demirbağ (yellow card) 16'; Guilherme (penalty missed) 38'; Çekiçi (yellow card) 67'	Report	Kitsiou (yellow card) 36'; Jevtović (yellow card) 43'; Soyalp (yellow card) 66'; Kızıldağ (yellow card) 68' (goal) 85'; Figueiredo (yellow card) 90+3'	Stadium: Konya Metropolitan Municipality Stadium; Attendance: 12,524; Referee: Çağdaş Altay

23 October 2022 11	Adana Demirspor	1–1	Konyaspor	Adana
17:00 TRT (UTC+3)	Akintola 32'; Rakitskyi (yellow card) 63'	Report	Diouf 22'; Dikmen (yellow card) 25'; Hadžiahmetović (yellow card) 37'; Šehić (yellow card) 37'; Oğuz (yellow card) 60'; Paz (yellow card) 77'; Murić (yellow card) 90+8'	Stadium: New Adana Stadium; Attendance: 20,103; Referee: Hüseyin Göçek

29 October 2022 12	Konyaspor	1–1	Kasımpaşa	Konya
14:30 TRT (UTC+3)	Oğuz (yellow card) 60'; Guilherme 82'; Demirtaş (yellow card) 87'; Ikpeazu (yellow card) 90+7'	Report	Ouanes (yellow card) 30'; Hajradinović 50' (yellow card) 81'; Taşkıran (yellow card) 90+4'; Koita (yellow card) 90+10'	Stadium: Konya Metropolitan Municipality Stadium; Attendance: 10,193; Referee: Atilla Karaoğlan

6 November 2022 13	Trabzonspor	2–2	Konyaspor	Trabzon
20:00 TRT (UTC+3)	Bakasetas 14' (pen.), (yellow card) 90+12'; Trézéguet 27' (pen.), (yellow card) 90+11'; Bozok (yellow card) 90+3'	Report	Demirbağ (yellow card) 13'; Michalak (yellow card) 26'; Diouf 45+8', 54'; Karayel (yellow card) 70'; Ikpeazu (yellow card) 79' (yellow-red card) 82'; Yazğılı (yellow card) 87'	Stadium: Şenol Güneş Sports Complex; Attendance: 26,065; Referee: Zorbay Küçük

13 November 2022 14	Kayserispor	1–2	Konyaspor	Kayseri
17:00 TRT (UTC+3)	Hosseini 8' (yellow card) 90'; Başsan (yellow card) 20'; Gavranović (yellow card) 37'; Sazdağı (yellow card) 89'	Report	Calvo 9'; Diouf 22' (pen.); Paz (yellow card) 58'; Ülgün (yellow card) 66'; Guilherme (yellow card) 68'; Amilton (yellow card) 90'	Stadium: Kadir Has Stadium; Attendance: 12,102; Referee: Kadir Sağlam

25 December 2022 15	Konyaspor	2–2	Alanyaspor	Konya
16:00 TRT (UTC+3)	Hadžiahmetović 22' (pen.), 90+11' (pen.); Calvo (yellow card) 75'; Ikpeazu (yellow card) 90+2'; Demirbağ (yellow card) 90+11'	Report	Hassan (yellow card) 43' (goal) 78' (pen.); Bayır 65'; Balkovec (yellow card) 90+11'; Cavaleiro (yellow card) 90+13'	Stadium: Konya Metropolitan Municipality Stadium; Attendance: 8,293; Referee: Bahattin Şimşek

16	Bye

4 January 2023 17	Konyaspor	2–2	Sivasspor	Konya
20:00 TRT (UTC+3)	Paz (yellow card) 04'; Demir 22' (yellow card) 42'; Hadžiahmetović 56' (pen.); Ikpeazu (yellow card) 90+4'; Çekiçi (yellow card) 90+5'	Report	Gradel 34' (pen.); Charisis 79'; Yalçın (yellow card) 90+3'	Stadium: Konya Metropolitan Municipality Stadium; Attendance: 6,612; Referee: Ümit Öztürk

8 January 2023 18	Fatih Karagümrük	3–3	Konyaspor	Istanbul
13:30 TRT (UTC+3)	Ozdoyev 7'; Shukurov (yellow card) 8'; Borini (yellow card) 27'; Diagne 33' (yellow card) 49'; Baniya (yellow card) 46'; Frei 88'; Biraschi (yellow card) 90+4'	Report	Ülgün (yellow card) 45+3'; Diouf 65', 72', 90+5'	Stadium: Atatürk Olympic Stadium; Attendance: 772; Referee: Kadir Sağlam

14 January 2023 19	Konyaspor	1–2	Beşiktaş	Konya
16:00 TRT (UTC+3)	Günok 1' (o.g.); Demirbağ (yellow card) 30'	Report	Tosun 67'; Masuaku (yellow card) 69'; Souza 90+5'	Stadium: Konya Metropolitan Municipality Stadium; Attendance: 21,757; Referee: Abdulkadir Bitigen

23 January 2023 20	Konyaspor	0–1	Ankaragücü	Konya
20:00 TRT (UTC+3)	Demirbağ (yellow card) 45+2'; Oğuz (yellow card) 73'; Ülgün (yellow card) 89'	Report	Çankaya (yellow card) 45+2'; Zahid 51'; Akkan (yellow card) 89'	Stadium: Konya Metropolitan Municipality Stadium; Attendance: 10,819; Referee: Murat Erdoğan

29 January 2023 21	İstanbul Başakşehir	2–0	Konyaspor	Istanbul
19:00 TRT (UTC+3)	Özcan 43'; Türüç 64' (pen.)	Report		Stadium: Fatih Terim Stadium; Attendance: 1,833; Referee: Suat Arslanboğa

2 February 2023 22	Konyaspor	0–1	İstanbulspor	Konya
17:00 TRT (UTC+3)	Paz (yellow card) 2'; Michalak (yellow card) 90+8'	Report	Eze (yellow card) 4'; Karayel 67' (o.g.); Erdoğan (yellow card) 85'; Duhaney (yellow card) 90+6'	Stadium: Konya Metropolitan Municipality Stadium; Referee: Ümit Öztürk

25 February 2023 23	Fenerbahçe	4–0	Konyaspor	Istanbul
19:00 TRT (UTC+3)	Arão (yellow card) 8'; Valencia 13' (pen.), 45+6'; King 61'; Szalai 78'	Report	Calvo (yellow card) 3'; Diouf (yellow card) 14' (yellow-red card) 22'; Oğuz (yellow card) 16'	Stadium: Şükrü Saracoğlu Stadium; Attendance: 36,259; Referee: Halil Umut Meler

5 March 2023 24	Konyaspor	0–0	Giresunspor	Konya
16:00 TRT (UTC+3)	Bouchalakis (yellow card) 18'; Paz (yellow card) 85'; Oğuz (yellow card) 89'	Report	Kaplan (yellow card) 42'; Sainz (yellow card) 85'; Genç (yellow card) 89'; Uludağ (yellow card) 90+5'	Stadium: Konya Metropolitan Municipality Stadium; Referee: Erkan Özdamar

25	Hatayspor	0–3 (w/o)	Konyaspor	Hatay
		Report		Stadium: New Hatay Stadium

17 March 2023 26	Konyaspor	2–1	Galatasaray	Konya
20:00 TRT (UTC+3)	Emreli (yellow card) 15'; Oğuz (yellow card) 15'; Dikmen 62'; Calvo (yellow card) 69'; Çekiçi (yellow card) 89'; Ülgün 90+3' (yellow card) 90+4'; Šehić (yellow card) 90+4'	Report	Rashica 31'; Kutlu (yellow card) 36'; Icardi (yellow card) 36'; Boey (yellow card) 61'; Muslera (yellow card) 90+4'	Stadium: Konya Metropolitan Municipality Stadium; Referee: Zorbay Küçük

2 April 2023 27	Ümraniyespor	2–2	Konyaspor	Istanbul
13:30 TRT (UTC+3)	Glumac (yellow card) 45+2'; Demirtaş (o.g.); Göksu (yellow card) 63'; Ayık 89'	Report	Demirbap (yellow card) 16'; Diouf 82'; Dikmen 90+7'	Stadium: Ümraniye Municipality City Stadium; Referee: Arda Kardeşler

7 April 2023 28	Konyaspor	1–1	Antalyaspor	Konya
20:30 TRT (UTC+3)	Demir 24'; Guilherme (yellow card) 87'; Calvo (yellow card) 90+3'	Report	Wright 45'; Fredy (yellow card) 57'; Uzunhan (yellow card) 90+3'; Ghacha (yellow card) 90+10'	Stadium: Konya Metropolitan Municipality Stadium; Referee: Direnç Tonusluoğlu

29	Gaziantep	0–3 (w/o)	Konyaspor	Gaziantep
		Report		Stadium: Gaziantep Stadium

19 April 2023 30	Konyaspor	1–2	Adana Demirspor	Konya
20:30 TRT (UTC+3)	Moreno (yellow card) 35'; Emreli 40', (yellow card) 90+11'; Šehić (yellow card) 57'	Report	Ndiaye (yellow card) 13', (goal) 28'; Akintola (red card) 48'; Svensson (yellow card) 70'	Stadium: Konya Metropolitan Municipality Stadium; Referee: Sarper Barış Saka

23 April 2023 31	Kasımpaşa	1–2	Konyaspor	Istanbul
13:30 TRT (UTC+3)	Fall 13', (yellow card) 22'; Fabiano (yellow card) 59'	Report	Calvo 30'; Diouf 45+6'; Moreno (yellow card) 60'	Stadium: Recep Tayyip Erdoğan Stadium; Referee: Yasin Kol

29 April 2023 32	Konyaspor	2–1	Trabzonspor	Konya
16:00 TRT (UTC+3)	Pozuelo 37'; Emreli (yellow card) 71'; Dikmen 85', (yellow card) 87'	Report	Hamšík 12'; Siopis (yellow card) 37'; Bakasetas (red card) 45+5'; Bozok (yellow card) 45+8'	Stadium: Konya Metropolitan Municipality Stadium; Referee: Cihan Aydın

7 May 2023 33	Konyaspor	2–2	Kayserispor	Konya
16:00 TRT (UTC+3)	Oğuz (yellow card) 38'; Yazğılı 48'; Dikmen 55'	Report	Sazdağı (yellow card) 41'; Cardoso 46', 52'	Stadium: Konya Metropolitan Municipality Stadium; Referee: Tugay Kaan Numanoğlu

16 May 2023 34	Alanyaspor	0–3	Konyaspor	Antalya
20:00 TRT (UTC+3)	Güneş (yellow card) 34'; Karagöz (yellow card) 43'; Aydın (yellow card) 83'; Lusamba (yellow card) 83'; Fer (yellow card) 90+3'	Report	Pozuelo 15', 74'; Calvo (yellow card) 24'; Dikmen 54'; Bouchalakis (yellow card) 78'	Stadium: Kırbıyık Holding Stadium; Referee: Çağdaş Altay

35	Bye

30 May 2023 36	Sivasspor	1–0	Konyaspor	Sivas
20:00 TRT (UTC+3)	James 17'; Sáiz (yellow card) 70'	Report	Calvo (yellow card) 50'; Demirbağ (yellow card) 78'	Stadium: New Sivas 4 Eylül Stadium; Referee: Bahattin Şimşek

3 June 2023 37	Konyaspor	1–1	Fatih Karagümrük	Konya
16:00 TRT (UTC+3)	Moreno 40'; Pozuelo (yellow card) 42'; Calvo (yellow card) 43'; Ülgün (yellow card) 78'	Report	Diagne 45+4'; Rodrigues (yellow card) 45'	Stadium: Konya Metropolitan Municipality Stadium; Referee: Yasin Kol

7 June 2023 38	Beşiktaş	3–3	Konyaspor	Istanbul
20:00 TRT (UTC+3)	Fernandes 6'; Muleka 41'; Bingöl 62'; Kılıçsoy (yellow card) 90+5'	Report	Ülgün 45+2', (yellow card) 61' (yellow-red card) 65'; Emreli 47'; Pozuelo 50'; Moreno (yellow card) 68'	Stadium: Vodafone Park; Referee: Ümit Öztürk

=== Turkish Cup ===
22 December 2022 Fifth round	Konyaspor	3–2 (a.e.t.)	Bodrumspor	Konya
15:00 TRT (UTC+3)	Ülgün (yellow card) 41'; Hadžiahmetović 64' 105' (pen.); Yazğılı (yellow card) 90+3'; Subaşı 115'; Demir (yellow card) 120+1'	Report	Aytemur (yellow card) 51'; Güneş (yellow card) 60'; Kurtuluş 83', 109'; Çetin (yellow card) 104'; Tarım (yellow card) 116'; Dumanlı (yellow card) 118'; Çetinkaya (yellow card) 120+1'	Stadium: Konya Metropolitan Municipality Stadium; Referee: Murat Erdoğan

19 January 2023 Round of 16	Gaziantep	1–1 (a.e.t.) (7–6 p)	Konyaspor	Gaziantep
17:30 TRT (UTC+3)	Maxim (yellow card) 25'; Toșca (yellow card) 45'; Eskihellaç 108'; Güvenç (yellow card) 116'	Report	Guilherme (penalty missed) 120+2'; Diouf 120+4'	Stadium: Gaziantep Stadium; Referee: Yiğit Arslan
	Penalties
	Maxim (penalty scored); Figueiredo (penalty scored); Jevtović (penalty scored); Merkel (penalty scored); Cihan (penalty scored); Djilobodji (penalty scored); Eskihellaç (penalty scored)		(penalty scored) Dikmen; (penalty scored) Calvo; (penalty scored) Ülgün; (penalty scored) Guilherme; (penalty scored) Büyüksayar; (penalty scored) Pavičić; (penalty missed) Yazğılı

=== UEFA Europa Conference League ===
==== Second qualifying round ====
21 July 2022 First leg	BATE Borisov (Belarus)	0–3	(Turkey) Konyaspor	Konya, Turkey (Note: Due to the country's involvement in the Russian invasion of Ukraine, Belarusian teams were required to play their home matches at neutral venues and behind closed doors until further notice.)
22:00 TRT (UTC+3)	Bocherov (yellow card) 86'	Report	Yazğılı (yellow card) 24' (yellow-red card) 40'; Bytyqi 39'; Michalak 58'; Šehić (yellow card) 79'; Murić 90+5'	Stadium: Konya Metropolitan Municipality Stadium; Attendance: 0 Referee: Gustavo Correia (Portugal)

28 July 2022 Second leg	Konyaspor (Turkey)	2–0 (5–0 agg.)	(Belarus) BATE Borisov	Konya, Turkey
21:00 TRT (UTC+3)	Rahmanović 37'; Calvo 43'; Cikalleshi (yellow card) 61' (yellow-red card) 74'	Report		Stadium: Konya Metropolitan Municipality Stadium; Attendance: 22,795; Referee: Novak Simović (Serbia)

==== Third qualifying round ====
4 August 2022 First leg	Vaduz (Liechtenstein)	1–1	(Turkey) Konyaspor	Vaduz, Liechtenstein
20:00 CEST (UTC+2)	Sasere 72'	Report	Demir (yellow card) 26' (goal) 88'; Oğuz (yellow card) 43'; Amilton (yellow card) 60'	Stadium: Rheinpark Stadion; Attendance: 2,032; Referee: Manfredas Lukjančukas (Lithuania)

11 August 2022 Second leg	Konyaspor (Turkey)	2–4 (3–5 agg.)	(Liechtenstein) Vaduz	Konya, Turkey
20:00 TRT (UTC+3)	Guilherme 18' (pen.); Karayel (yellow card) 43'; Hadžiahmetović 90+5'	Report	Gasser 28', 89'; Sutter 31'; Fosso (yellow card) 40'; Çiçek 67'; Isik (yellow card) 90+1'	Stadium: Konya Metropolitan Municipality Stadium; Attendance: 22,723; Referee: Guillermo Cuadra Fernández (Spain)
