= 2023–24 Konyaspor season =

Konyaspor
2023–24 season
- President: Fatih Özgökçen (until 27 November ) Ömer Korkmaz (from 27 November)
- Head coach: Aleksandar Stanojević (until 22 October ) Hakan Keleş (from 27 October)
- Stadium: Konya Metropolitan Municipality Stadium
- Süper Lig: 19th
- Turkish Cup: Round of 16
- Average home league attendance: 12,220
Home colours	Away colours	Third colours
- All statistics correct as of 16 December 2023.

The 2023–24 season is Konyaspor's 57th season in existence and 11th consecutive in the Süper Lig, the top division of association football in Turkey. They are also competing in the Turkish Cup.

== Players ==
=== First-team squad ===
As of 9 February 2024

Note: Flags indicate national team as defined under FIFA eligibility rules; some limited exceptions apply. Players may hold more than one non-FIFA nationality.

No.	Pos.	Nation	Player
1	GK	TUR	Deniz Ertaş
3	DF	TUR	Yasir Subaşı
4	DF	TUR	Adil Demirbağ
5	DF	TUR	Uğurcan Yazğılı
6	MF	TUR	Soner Dikmen
7	MF	CIV	Anderson Niangbo
8	MF	ROU	Alexandru Cicâldău (on loan from Galatasaray)
9	FW	TUR	Muhammet Demir
10	MF	TUR	Yunus Mallı
11	MF	DEN	Louka Prip
12	DF	BRA	Guilherme
13	GK	TUR	Mehmet Erdoğan
14	DF	TUR	Metehan Mert
15	DF	ZIM	Teenage Hadebe
17	FW	ALB	Sokol Cikalleshi
18	FW	SEN	Alassane Ndao

No.	Pos.	Nation	Player
19	DF	TUR	Cebrail Karayel
20	DF	TUR	Kahraman Demirtaş
21	MF	CRO	Niko Rak
22	DF	TUR	Ahmet Oğuz
23	MF	ANG	Bruno Paz
25	FW	SEN	Bouly Sambou
26	MF	GHA	Emmanuel Boateng
27	GK	POL	Jakub Słowik
30	MF	TUR	Gökhan Töre
33	DF	SRB	Filip Damjanović
35	MF	TUR	Oğulcan Ülgün
37	MF	FRA	Steven Nzonzi
42	FW	TUR	Mehmet Ali Büyüksayar
70	FW	COL	Marlos Moreno
72	FW	MKD	Valon Ethemi (on loan from İstanbulspor)

=== Out on loan ===
Note: Flags indicate national team as defined under FIFA eligibility rules; some limited exceptions apply. Players may hold more than one non-FIFA nationality.

No.	Pos.	Nation	Player
—	DF	TUR	Veysi Karaduman (at 1922 Konyaspor until 30 June 2024)
—	DF	TUR	Yaşar Kavas (at 1922 Konyaspor until 30 June 2024)
—	DF	TUR	Nafican Yardımcı (at Esenler Erokspor until 30 June 2024)
—	MF	TUR	Adem Eren Kabak (at Şanlıurfaspor until 30 June 2024)
—	MF	TUR	Çağdaş Şendur (at 1922 Konyaspor until 30 June 2024)

No.	Pos.	Nation	Player
—	MF	TUR	Hüseyin Mert Uyanıker (at Siirt İl Özel İdaresi SK until 30 June 2024)
—	FW	TUR	Emrehan Gedikli (at İstanbulspor until 30 June 2024)
—	FW	TUR	Ata Berk Karababa (at Karaman FK until 30 June 2024)
—	FW	TUR	Ahmet Karademir (at Karaman FK until 30 June 2024)

== Transfers ==
=== In ===
Pos.	Player	Transferred from	Fee	Date	Source
MF	(Turkey) Yunus Mallı	(Turkey) Kasımpaşa	Free	12 July 2023	
GK	(France) Paul Bernardoni	(France) Angers	Undisclosed	1 August 2023	
MF	(France) Morgan Schneiderlin	(France) Nice	Free	1 August 2023	
MF	(France) Steven Nzonzi	(Qatar) Al-Rayyan	Undisclosed	25 August 2023	
FW	(Portugal) Nélson Oliveira	Unattached	Free	4 September 2023	
FW	(Germany) Emrehan Gedikli	Unattached	Free	14 September 2023	

=== Out ===
Pos.	Player	Transferred to	Fee	Date	Source
MF	(France) Morgan Schneiderlin	Released		10 August 2023	
MF	(Albania) Endri Çekiçi	(Turkey) Pendikspor	Free	17 August 2023	
MF	(Poland) Konrad Michalak	(Saudi Arabia) Ohod	€1,100,000	12 September 2023	

== Pre-season and friendlies ==
Win Draw Loss Fixtures

== Competitions ==
=== Overall record ===
Competition	First match	Last match	Starting round	Record							
Competition	First match	Last match	Starting round	Pld	W	D	L	GF	GA	GD	Win %
Süper Lig	12 August 2023	19 May 2024	Matchday 1	26	5	10	11	24	39	−15	19.23
Turkish Cup	6 December 2023		Fourth round	3	3	0	0	6	1	+5	100.00
Total				29	8	10	11	30	40	−10	27.59

Last updated: 19 February 2024
Source: Soccerway

=== Süper Lig ===
==== League table ====
Pos	Team	Pld	W	D	L	GF	GA	GD	Pts	Qualification or relegation
14	Kayserispor (Note: 3 points deducted)	38	11	12	15	44	57	−13	42	
15	Hatayspor	38	9	14	15	45	52	−7	41 (Note: Hatayspor are ahead of Konyaspor on overall goal difference.)	
16	Konyaspor	38	9	14	15	40	53	−13	41	
17	Ankaragücü (R)	38	8	16	14	46	52	−6	40 (Note: Ankaragücü are ahead of Fatih Karagümrük on head-to-head points: Fatih Karagümrük 1–1 Ankaragücü, Ankaragücü 2–0 Fatih Karagümrük.)	Relegation to TFF First League
18	Fatih Karagümrük (R)	38	10	10	18	49	52	−3	40	Relegation to TFF First League

Source: Süper Lig
Rules for classification: 1) Points; 2) Head-to-head points; 3) Head-to-head goal difference; 4) Head-to-head goals scored; 5) Goal difference; 6) Goals scored; 7) Play-off.
(R) Relegated

==== Results summary ====
Overall								Home						Away					
Pld	W	D	L	GF	GA	GD	Pts	W	D	L	GF	GA	GD	W	D	L	GF	GA	GD
26	5	10	11	24	39	−15	25	4	3	5	14	13	+1	1	7	6	10	26	−16

Last updated: 19 February 2024.
Source: Trendyol Süper Lig

==== Results by round ====
Round	1	2	3	4	5	6	7	8	9	10	11	12	13	14	15	16	17	18	19	20	21	22	23	24	25	26	27
Ground	H	A	H	A	H	A	H	A	H	A	H	A	H	A	H	A	A	H	A	A	H	A	H	A	H	A	H
Result	D	D	W	W	L	D	L	L	L	L	D	L	W	D	L	L	D	W	L	D	D	D	L	D	W	L	
Position	10	12	6	4	7	9	11	14	15	15	16	16	15	15	16	18	18	17	18	18	18	19	19	19	19	19	

Updated to match(es) played on 19 February 2024. Source: Trendyol Süper Lig
A = Away; H = Home; W = Win; D = Draw; L = Loss

==== Matches ====
The league fixtures were unveiled on 19 July 2023.

12 August 2023 1	Konyaspor	1–1	İstanbulspor	Konya
19:15 UTC+3	Oğuz (yellow card) 42'; Cikalleshi (yellow card) 58', (goal) 86'; Demirtaş (yellow card) 80'; Demirbağ (red card) 80'	Report	Yılmaz 6', (yellow card) 75'; Yaşar (yellow card) 60' (yellow-red card); Yeşil (yellow card) 63'; Loshaj (yellow card) 80'; Erdoğan (red card) 80'; Gültekin (penalty missed) 90+3'	Stadium: Konya Metropolitan Municipality Stadium; Attendance: 5,552; Referee: Burak Pakkan

18 August 2023 2	Antalyaspor	1–1	Konyaspor	Antalya
21:00 UTC+3	Kałuziński (yellow card) 55'; Holtmann (yellow card) 74'; Vural 87'	Report	Cikalleshi 60' (pen.); Oğuz (yellow card) 86'; Paz (yellow card) 90+7'	Stadium: Antalya Stadium; Referee: Ali Şansalan

25 August 2023 3	Konyaspor	2–0	Gaziantep	Konya
21:00 UTC+3	Calvo (yellow card) 45'; Guilherme 68'; Robert Murić 90+5'	Report	Ersoy (yellow card) 4'; Riascos (yellow card) 31'	Stadium: Konya Metropolitan Municipality Stadium; Referee: Mete Kalkavan

2 September 2023 4	İstanbul Başakşehir	0–1	Konyaspor	Istanbul
19:15 UTC+3		Report	Cikalleshi 53'	Stadium: Başakşehir Fatih Terim Stadium; Referee: Atilla Karaoğlan

24 September 2023 6	Ankaragücü	1–1	Konyaspor	Ankara
17:00 TRT (UTC+3)				Stadium: Eryaman Stadium

3 February 2024 24	Çaykur Rizespor	0–0	Konyaspor	Rize
13:30 TRT (UTC+3)	Şahin (yellow card) 45+1'		Moreno (yellow card) 90+2'	Stadium: City of Rize Stadium; Referee: Cihan Aydın

11 February 2024 25	Konyaspor	1–0	Ankaragücü	Konya
16:00 TRT (UTC+3)	Prip 38'			Stadium: Konya Metropolitan Municipality Stadium; Referee: Direnç Tonusluoğlu

19 February 2024 26	Beşiktaş	2–0	Konyaspor	Istanbul
20:00 TRT (UTC+3)	Kılıçsoy 49'; Tosun 71'			Stadium: Beşiktaş Stadium; Referee: Tugay Kaan Numanoğlu

24 February 2024 27	Konyaspor	v	Hatayspor	Konya
19:00 TRT (UTC+3)				Stadium: Konya Metropolitan Municipality Stadium

=== Turkish Cup ===
2 November 2023 Third round	Konyaspor	3–0	Erbaaspor	Konya
17:30	Muric 55'; Gedikli 85'; Prip 90+2'			Stadium: Konya Metropolitan Municipality Stadium

6 December 2023 Fourth round	Konyaspor	3–0	Beyoğlu Yeniçarşıspor	Konya
15:00	Gedikli 14'; Mallı 34'; Paz 74'			Stadium: Konya Metropolitan Municipality Stadium

18 January 2024 Fifth round	Konyaspor	2–1 (a.e.t.)	Göztepe	Konya
17:00	Ülgün 75'; Prip 105+1'		Héliton 60'	Stadium: Konya Metropolitan Municipality Stadium

7 February 2024 Round of 16	Sivasspor	v	Konyaspor	Sivas
14:30				Stadium: New Sivas 4 Eylül Stadium
