= 2020–21 Konyaspor season =

Konyaspor
2020–21 season
- Chairman: Hilmi Kulluk
- Manager: Bülent Korkmaz (until 12 September 2020); İsmail Kartal (until 8 February 2021); İlhan Palut (from 9 February 2021)
- Stadium: Konya Büyükşehir Stadium
- Süper Lig: 11th
- Turkish Cup: Quarter-finals
- Top goalscorer: Artem Kravets (7)
Home colours	Away colours	Third colours

The 2020–21 season was Konyaspor's 99th season in existence and the club's eighth consecutive season in the top flight of Turkish football. In addition to the domestic league, Konyaspor participated in this season's edition of the Turkish Cup. The season covers the period from July 2020 to 30 June 2021.

== Players ==
=== First-team squad ===
As of 3 February 2021

Note: Flags indicate national team as defined under FIFA eligibility rules; some limited exceptions apply. Players may hold more than one non-FIFA nationality.

No.	Pos.	Nation	Player
2	MF	TUR	Volkan Fındıklı
4	DF	TUR	Adil Demirbağ
5	DF	BIH	Marin Aničić
6	DF	TUR	Ahmet Yılmaz Çalık
8	MF	SRB	Marko Jevtović
11	MF	BIH	Deni Milošević
12	DF	BRA	Guilherme
13	GK	BIH	Ibrahim Šehić
14	MF	KOS	Zymer Bytyqi
16	MF	TUR	Oğuz Kağan Güçtekin (on loan from Fenerbahçe)
17	FW	ALB	Sokol Cikalleshi
18	MF	BIH	Amir Hadžiahmetović
19	MF	GEO	Levan Shengelia
20	MF	TUR	İsmail Güven
21	MF	UGA	Farouk Miya

No.	Pos.	Nation	Player
23	FW	UKR	Artem Kravets
25	DF	TUR	Alper Uludağ
27	MF	CIV	Ismaël Diomandé
28	MF	TUR	Musa Çağıran
29	MF	BIH	Amar Rahmanović
34	GK	TUR	Eray Birniçan
35	GK	TUR	Ozan Can Oruç
42	DF	TUR	Abdülkerim Bardakcı (Captain)
49	FW	TUR	Ahmet Karademir
54	GK	TUR	Erten Ersu
70	FW	NGR	Emem Eduok (on loan from Hajduk Split)
71	FW	NGR	Jesse Sekidika (on loan from Galatasaray)
86	MF	TUR	İzzet Karaboğa
88	FW	MKD	Erdon Daci
89	DF	SLO	Nejc Skubic

=== Out on loan ===
Note: Flags indicate national team as defined under FIFA eligibility rules; some limited exceptions apply. Players may hold more than one non-FIFA nationality.

No.	Pos.	Nation	Player
—	GK	TUR	Mücahit Atalay (at 1922 Konyaspor)
—	DF	TUR	Kaan Özdemir (at Kahramanmaraşspor)

No.	Pos.	Nation	Player
—	MF	TUR	Maksut Taşkıran (at 1922 Konyaspor)
—	FW	TUR	Seddar Karaman (at 1922 Konyaspor)

== Transfers ==
=== In ===
No.	Pos	Player	Transferred from	Fee	Date	Source
15			TBD		1 July 2020	

=== Out ===
No.	Pos	Player	Transferred to	Fee	Date	Source
15			TBD		1 July 2020	

== Pre-season and friendlies ==
Win Draw Loss Fixtures

== Competitions ==
=== Overview ===
Competition	First match	Last match	Starting round	Final position	Record							
Competition	First match	Last match	Starting round	Final position	Pld	W	D	L	GF	GA	GD	Win %
Süper Lig	19 September 2020	16 May 2021	Matchday 2		28	8	9	11	34	35	−1	28.57
Turkish Cup	26 November 2020	11 February 2021	Fourth round	Quarter-finals	4	3	1	0	13	3	+10	75.00
Total					32	11	10	11	47	38	+9	34.38

Last updated: 15 March 2021
Source: TFF.org

=== Süper Lig ===
==== League table ====
Pos	Team	Pld	W	D	L	GF	GA	GD	Pts
9	Gaziantep	40	15	13	12	59	51	+8	58
10	Göztepe	40	13	12	15	59	59	0	51
11	Konyaspor	40	12	14	14	49	48	+1	50
12	Başakşehir	40	12	12	16	43	55	−12	48
13	Çaykur Rizespor	40	12	12	16	53	69	−16	48

Source: Süper Lig, Soccerway
Rules for classification: 1) Points; 2) Head-to-head points; 3) Head-to-head goal difference; 4) Head-to-head goals scored; 5) Goal difference; 6) Goals scored; 7) Play-off.

==== Results summary ====
Overall								Home						Away					
Pld	W	D	L	GF	GA	GD	Pts	W	D	L	GF	GA	GD	W	D	L	GF	GA	GD
28	8	9	11	34	35	−1	33	5	5	4	19	16	+3	3	4	7	15	19	−4

Last updated: 8 March 2021.
Source: Soccerway

==== Results by round ====
Round	1	2	3	4	5	6	7	8	9	10	11	12	13	14	15	16	17	18	19	20	21	22	23	24	25	26	27	28	29	30	31	32	33	34	35	36	37	38	39	40	41	42
Ground	B	A	H	A	H	A	H	A	H	A	H	A	H	A	H	A	H	A	H	A	H	B	H	A	H	A	H	A	H	A	H	A	H	A	H	A	H	A	H	A	H	A
Result	B	D	W	D	D	L	L	W	W	L	W	L	L	W	D	L	W	L	L	L	D	B	D	L	W	W	D	D														
Position	11	13	9	11	11	16	16	13	10	11	7	11	13	10	10	12	8	10	13	15	16	16	15	15	13	12	12	12														

Updated to match(es) played on 3 March 2021. Source: TFF.org
A = Away; H = Home; B = Bye; W = Win; D = Draw; L = Loss

Note: Since the league has been expanded to 21 teams each team will earn a bye twice this season.

==== Matches ====
1	BYE

19 September 2020 2	Gençlerbirliği	0–0	Konyaspor	Ankara
14:30 TRT		Report	Şahiner (yellow card) 76'; Eduok (yellow card) 86'; Skubic (yellow card) 90+4'	Stadium: Eryaman Stadium; Attendance: 0 Referee: Mustafa Öğretmenoğlu

27 September 2020 3	Konyaspor	4–1	Beşiktaş	Konya
17:00 TRT	Shengelia 28' (yellow card) 55' (goal) 78'; Jevtović (yellow card) 30'; Cikalleshi (yellow card) 38'; Kravets 63' 83' (pen.); Miya (yellow card) 90+3'	Report	Uysal (yellow card) 40'; Toköz (yellow card) 60'; Nsakala (yellow card) 77'; Vida (yellow card) 81'; Töre 90+1'	Stadium: Konya Büyükşehir Stadium; Attendance: 0 Referee: Abdullkadir Bitigen

4 October 2020 4	Denizlispor	0–0	Konyaspor	Denizli
14:30 TRT	Tiago Lopes (yellow card) 90+2'	Report		Stadium: Denizli Atatürk Stadium; Attendance: 0 Referee: Hüseyin Göçek

17 October 2020 5	Konyaspor	1–1	Yeni Malatyaspor	Konya
17:00 TRT	Bardakcı (yellow card) 18'; Çalık (yellow card) 63'; Uludağ (yellow card) 66'; Kravets 83'; Eduok (yellow card) 86'	Report	Tetteh (yellow card) 25'; Yavru 58'; Chebake (yellow card) 73'	Stadium: Konya Büyükşehir Stadium; Attendance: 0 Referee: Turgut Doman

24 October 2020 6	Gaziantep FK	1–0	Konyaspor	Gaziantep
17:00 TRT	Dicko (yellow card) 24'; Vural (yellow card) 34'; Vetrih (yellow card) 53'; Demir 75'	Report	Guilherme (yellow card) 22'; Milošević (yellow card) 36'; Miya (yellow card) 42'; Çalık (yellow card) 90+3'; Šehić (yellow card) 90+4'	Stadium: Gaziantep Arena; Attendance: 0 Referee: Özgür Yankaya

1 November 2020 7	Konyaspor	1–2	İstanbul Başakşehir	Konya
16:00 TRT	Guilherme (yellow card) 7'; Uludağ (yellow card) 21'; Kravets 69'; Jevtović (yellow card) 79'	Report	Jevtović 45' (o.g.); Türüç (yellow card) 55'; Aleksić 58'	Stadium: Konya Büyükşehir Stadium; Attendance: 0 Referee: Halil Umut Meler

7 November 2020 8	Fenerbahçe	0–2	Konyaspor	Istanbul
19:00 TRT	Tufan (yellow card) 68'; Aziz (yellow card) 81'	Report	Jevtović 67'; Šehić (yellow card) 73'; Kravets 77'; Uludağ (yellow card) 84'; Demirbağ (yellow card) 88'	Stadium: Şükrü Saracoğlu Stadium; Attendance: 0 Referee: Ali Şansalan

22 November 2020 9	Konyaspor	2–1	Kasımpaşa	Konya
16:00 TRT	Jevtović (yellow card) 21'; Skubic 48'; Demirbağ (yellow card) 84'; Çağıran 89'; Kravets (yellow card) 90+2'	Report	Kara 17' (yellow card) 89'; Haddadi (yellow card) 60'; Břečka (yellow card) 88'	Stadium: Konya Büyükşehir Stadium; Attendance: 0 Referee: Yasin Kol

29 November 2020 10	Alanyaspor	1–0	Konyaspor	Alanya
16:00 TRT	Moubandje (yellow card) 11'; Babacar 37'; Bakasetas (yellow card) 74'; Aksoy (yellow card) 90+3'	Report	Kravets (yellow card) 14'; Cikalleshi (yellow card) 25'; Uludağ (yellow card) 45+2'; Milošević (yellow card) 75'; Bardakcı (yellow card) 80'	Stadium: Bahçeşehir Okulları Stadium; Attendance: 0 Referee: Bahattin Şimşek

5 December 2020 11	Konyaspor	2–0	BB Erzurumspor	Konya
16:00 TRT	Demirok 14' (pen.); Hadžiahmetović 63'	Report	Uçar (red card) 12'; Kardeş (yellow card) 54'	Stadium: Konya Büyükşehir Stadium; Attendance: 0 Referee: Halis Özkahya

12 December 2020 12	Ankaragücü	4–3	Konyaspor	Ankara
19:00 TRT	Lobzhanidze 15'; Dioussé (yellow card) 20'; Bolingi (yellow card) 29' (yellow-red card) 90+6'; Børven 48'; Paintsil 78'; Güral 89' (pen.) (yellow card) 90'; Aygören (yellow card) 90+1'	Report	Demirok (yellow card) 21' (goal) 29' (pen.); Milošević 38'; Jevtović (yellow card) 39'; Skubic 69'; Demirbağ (yellow card) 88'	Stadium: Eryaman Stadium; Attendance: 0 Referee: Mete Kalkavan

21 December 2020 13	Konyaspor	0–1	Sivasspor	Konya
19:00 TRT (UTC+3)		Report	Fajr 60'	Stadium: Konya Büyükşehir Stadium; Attendance: 0 Referee: Fırat Aydınus

24 December 2020 14	Kayserispor	1–2	Konyaspor	Kayseri
16:00	Henrique 45+5' (pen.) (yellow card) 51'; Lennon (yellow card) 54' (yellow-red card) 64'	Report	Demirok 89' (pen.); Jevtović (yellow card) 45+1' (goal) 90+8'	Stadium: Kayseri; Attendance: 0 Referee: Ali Palabıyık; Fourth official: Burak Pakkan

28 December 2020 15	Konyaspor	1–1	Çaykur Rizespor	Konya
16:00 TRT (UTC+3)	Hadžiahmetović 7'	Report	Torun 65'; Pehlivan (red card) 90+5'	Stadium: Konya Büyükşehir Stadium; Referee: Burak Şeker

2 January 2021 16	Hatayspor	2–1	Konyaspor	Hatay
19:00 TRT (UTC+3)	Boupendza 43', 68'	Report	Kravets 33'	Stadium: Antakya Atatürk Stadium; Attendance: 0 Referee: Alper Ulusoy

5 January 2021 17	Konyaspor	4–3	Galatasaray	Konya
19:00 TRT	Jevtović (yellow card) 34'; Daci 41', 46'; Abdülkerim (yellow card) 77'; Uğur 82' (pen.); Kravets 90+2'	Report	Ömer (yellow card) 39'; Donk (yellow card) 44'; Diagne 45+2', 77' (pen.); Oğulcan 90+5'	Stadium: Konya Büyükşehir Stadium; Attendance: 0 Referee: Arda Kardeşler; Assistant referees: Ali Saygın Ögel, Özgür Ertem; Fourth official: Ramazan Keleş

10 January 2021 18	Fatih Karagümrük	2–1	Konyaspor	Istanbul
13:30	Bertolacci 66'; Ndiaye 81'	Report	Jevtović 84'	Stadium: Atatürk Olympic Stadium; Attendance: 0 Referee: Serkan Tokat

19 January 2021 20	Trabzonspor	3–1	Konyaspor	Trabzon
19:00	Anthony Nwakaeme 22' (yellow card) 69'; Flávio 57'; Djaniny 60'; Lewis Baker (yellow card) 81'; Kamil Çörekçi (yellow card) 89'	Report	Ömer Ali Şahiner (yellow card) 24'; Sokol Cikalleshi (yellow card) 35'; Ismaël Diomandé (yellow card) 45'; Levan Shengelia 88'; Musa Çağıran (yellow card) 90'	Stadium: Şenol Güneş Stadium; Attendance: 0 Referee: Abdulkadir Bitigen; Assistant referees: Serkan Ok, Mustafa Savranlar; Fourth official: Emre Kargın

24 January 2021 21	Konyaspor	0–0	Antalyaspor	Konya
13:30 TRT (UTC+3)	Hadžiahmetović (yellow card) 31'	Report	(yellow card) 70' Amilton	Stadium: Konya Büyükşehir Stadium; Attendance: 0 Referee: Tugay Kaan Numanoğlu

22	BYE

7 February 2021 24	Beşiktaş	1–0	Konyaspor	Istanbul
19:00 TRT (UTC+3)	Nsakala (yellow card) 15' (yellow-red card) 21'; Uysal (yellow card) 55'; Rosier 81'; Vida (yellow card) 90'	Report	Jevtović (yellow card) 2'; Çağıran (yellow card) 77'; Skubic (yellow card) 90'	Stadium: Vodafone Park; Attendance: 0 Referee: Halis Özkahya

14 February 2021 25	Konyaspor	2–0	Denizlispor	Konya
13:30	Bardakcı 52'; Sekidika 80'	Report		Stadium: Konya Büyükşehir Stadium

20 February 2021 26	Yeni Malatyaspor	2–3	Konyaspor	Malatya
16:00	Büyük 24', 45+4' (pen.)	Report	Diomandé 72'; Cikalleshi 80', 84'	Stadium: Malatya Arena; Attendance: 0 Referee: Sarper Baris Saka; Fourth official: Bayram Başkan

8 March 2021 29	Konyaspor	0–3	Fenerbahçe	Konya
19:00	Diomandé (yellow card) 22'; Demirbağ (yellow card) 25'	Report	Szalai 29'; Osayi-Samuel 32'; Valencia (yellow card) 58'; Samatta (yellow card) 85'; Aziz 90'	Stadium: Konya Büyükşehir Stadium; Attendance: 0 Referee: Fırat Aydınus

21 March 2021 31	Konyaspor	1–0	Alanyaspor	Konya
13:30 TRT (UTC+3)		Report		Stadium: Konya Büyükşehir Stadium; Attendance: 0 Referee: Koray Gençerler

18 April 2021 35	Konyaspor	v	Kayserispor	Konya
				Stadium: Konya Büyükşehir Stadium; Attendance: 0

38	Galatasaray	v	Konyaspor	Istanbul
		Report		Stadium: Türk Telekom Stadium

=== Turkish Cup ===
26 November 2020 Fourth round	Konyaspor	7–0	Manisa FK	Konya
18:00 TRT (UTC+3)	Hurtado 9', 42', 81'; Eduok 15'; Demirok 31' (pen.); Daci 50', 79'	Report	Uysal (red card) 59'; Gündoğdu (yellow card) 70'	Stadium: Konya Büyükşehir Stadium; Attendance: 0 Referee: Ramazan Keleş

17 December 2020 Fifth round	Konyaspor	3–1	Altınordu	Konya
12:00 TRT (UTC+3)	Karademir 21'; Şahiner 74'; Milošević 80'	Report	Destan 12'	Stadium: Konya Büyükşehir Stadium; Attendance: 0 Referee: Mustafa Kürşad Filiz

13 January 2021 Round of 16	Konyaspor	2–1	Gaziantep	Konya
15:45 TRT (UTC+3)	Anicic 11'; Şahiner 40'	Report	Demir 90+4'	Stadium: Konya Büyükşehir Stadium; Attendance: 0 Referee: Suat Arslanboğa

11 February 2021 Quarter-finals	Konyaspor	1–1 (a.e.t.) (2–3 p)	Beşiktaş	Konya
20:45 TRT (UTC+3)	Bardakçı 18'	Report	Özyakup 13'	Stadium: Konya Büyükşehir Stadium; Attendance: 0 Referee: Ali Palabıyık
	Penalties
	Kravets (penalty missed); Guilherme (penalty scored); Skubic (penalty missed); Miya (penalty scored); Bardakçı (penalty missed)		(penalty scored) Ghezzal; (penalty missed) Mensah; (penalty scored) Uysal; (penalty scored) Rosier
