= List of Turkish football transfers winter 2020–21 =

This is a list of Turkish football transfers for the 2020–21 winter transfer window by club. Only transfers of clubs in the Süper Lig are included.

The winter transfer window opened on 1 January 2021, although a few transfers took place prior to that date. The window closed at midnight on 2 February 2021. Players without a club may join one at any time, either during or in between transfer windows.

== Süper Lig ==
=== Alanyaspor ===
In:

No.	Pos.	Nation	Player
14	MF	TUR	Hasan Hüseyin Acar (from Kayserispor)
30	GK	TUR	Serkan Kırıntılı (from Konyaspor)
35	DF	TUR	Furkan Bayir (from Menemenspor)
92	MF	POL	Damian Kądzior (on loan from (Spain) Eibar)
-	MF	MTN	El Mami Tetah (from (Mauritania) ACS Ksar)
-	FW	TUR	Muhammed Arda Uzun (from Sarıyer)

Out:

No.	Pos.	Nation	Player

=== Ankaragücü ===
In:

No.	Pos.	Nation	Player
24	MF	TUR	İbrahim Akdağ (from BB Erzurumspor)
27	FW	SEN	Aliou Badji (on loan from (Egypt) Al Ahly)
29	FW	ANG	Geraldo (from (Egypt) Al Ahly)
34	DF	TUR	Alperen Babacan (from Akhisarspor)
97	FW	TUR	Embiya Ayyildiz (from Ergene Velimeşe)
-	MF	TUR	Ali Kaan Güneren (from Akhisarspor)

Out:

No.	Pos.	Nation	Player
7	MF	SRB	Luka Adžić (loan return to (Belgium) Anderlecht, later loaned to (Netherlands) Emmen)
9	FW	COD	Jonathan Bolingi (loan return to (Belgium) Antwerp, later loaned to (Switzerland) Lausanne-Sport)
26	FW	TUR	Mücahit Can Akçay (on loan to Hekimoğlu Trabzon)

=== Antalyaspor ===
In:

No.	Pos.	Nation	Player

Out:

No.	Pos.	Nation	Player
18	FW	MKD	Adis Jahović (to Göztepe)

=== Beşiktaş ===
In:

No.	Pos.	Nation	Player
28	MF	TUR	Bilal Ceylan (from Eskişehirspor)
29	FW	TUR	Cenk Tosun (on loan from (England) Everton)

Out:

No.	Pos.	Nation	Player
2	DF	FRA	Nicolas Isimat-Mirin (to (United States) Sporting Kansas City)
9	FW	TUR	Güven Yalçın (on loan to (Italy) Lecce)
11	FW	USA	Tyler Boyd (on loan to Sivasspor)
12	DF	TUR	Erdoğan Kaya (on loan to Turgutluspor)
77	MF	NED	Jeremain Lens (on loan to Fatih Karagümrük)

=== BB Erzurumspor ===
In:

No.	Pos.	Nation	Player
8	MF	KEN	Johanna Omolo (from (Belgium) Cercle Brugge)
15	MF	KOS	Elbasan Rashani (from (Norway) Odd)
89	MF	GHA	Yaw Ackah (on loan from Kayserispor)
-	DF	BFA	Yacouba Coulibaly (from (France) Le Havre)

Out:

No.	Pos.	Nation	Player
9	MF	FRA	Rashad Muhammed (to (Norway) Sarpsborg 08)
24	MF	TUR	İbrahim Akdağ (to Ankaragücü)
-	DF	TUR	Yusuf Acer (loan return to Çaykur Rizespor, later released from the club)

=== Çaykur Rizespor ===
In:

No.	Pos.	Nation	Player
14	FW	NOR	Alexander Søderlund (from (Sweden) BK Häcken)
52	MF	SVK	Erik Sabo (from Fatih Karagümrük)
71	FW	TUR	Celal Emir Dede (from Balıkesirspor)
88	MF	CRO	Damjan Đoković (from (Romania) CFR Cluj)

Out:

No.	Pos.	Nation	Player
9	FW	TUR	Kemal Rüzgar (released)
14	DF	TUR	Yusuf Acer (released, previously on loan at BB Erzurumspor)
19	MF	SRB	Dušan Jovančić (on loan to (Kazakhstan) Tobol)
28	MF	CIV	Ismaël Diomandé (to Konyaspor)
95	GK	TUR	Boğaçhan Kazmaz (released)

=== Denizlispor ===
In:

No.	Pos.	Nation	Player
5	DF	TUR	Kubilay Aktaş (from Gaziantep)
17	MF	IRQ	Ahmed Ghani (from (Sweden) BK Häcken)
25	FW	KOS	Veton Tusha (Promoted)
42	MF	USA	Mix Diskerud (from (England) Manchester City)
-	DF	TUN	Ayman Ben Mohamed (on loan from (France) Le Havre)
-	DF	TUR	Görkem Can (from (Netherlands) Groningen)

Out:

No.	Pos.	Nation	Player
4	DF	SRB	Neven Subotić (released)
10	MF	MAR	Ismaïl Aissati (released)
-	MF	ARG	Federico Varela (to (Bulgaria) CSKA Sofia)

=== Fatih Karagümrük ===
In:

No.	Pos.	Nation	Player
16	FW	ITA	Fabio Borini (from (Italy) Hellas Verona)
26	DF	NOR	Vegar Eggen Hedenstad (from (Norway) Rosenborg)
37	DF	ARG	Gastón Campi (on loan from Trabzonspor)
77	MF	NED	Jeremain Lens (on loan from Beşiktaş)
89	MF	ARG	Lucas Castro (from (Italy) SPAL)
90	FW	SUI	Kemal Ademi (on loan from Fenerbahçe)
91	MF	ITA	Andrea Bertolacci (from (Italy) Sampdoria)
-	MF	TUR	Serhat Ahmetoğlu (on loan from Fenerbahçe)

Out:

No.	Pos.	Nation	Player
28	MF	TUR	Ramazan Civelek (to Kayserispor)
-	MF	SVK	Erik Sabo (to Çaykur Rizespor)

=== Fenerbahçe ===
In:

No.	Pos.	Nation	Player
17	MF	TUR	İrfan Kahveci (from İstanbul Başakşehir)
21	MF	NGA	Bright Osayi-Samuel (from (England) QPR)
41	DF	HUN	Attila Szalai (from (Cyprus) Apollon Limassol)
67	MF	GER	Mesut Özil (from (England) Arsenal)
71	MF	TUR	İsmail Yüksek (loan return from Balıkesirspor)

Out:

No.	Pos.	Nation	Player
6	MF	TUR	Tolga Ciğerci (to İstanbul Başakşehir)
17	MF	MAR	Nabil Dirar (on loan to (Belgium) Club Brugge)
57	MF	TUR	Eyüp Akcan (on loan to Tarsus İdman Yurdu)
70	MF	TUR	Serhat Ahmetoğlu (on loan to Fatih Karagümrük)
71	MF	TUR	İsmail Yüksek (on loan to Adana Demirspor, previously on loan at Balıkesirspor)
99	FW	SUI	Kemal Ademi (on loan to Fatih Karagümrük)
-	FW	TUR	Melih Bostan (on loan to Serik Belediyespor)
-	FW	TUR	Gülhan Üreyen (on loan to İnegölspor)

=== Galatasaray ===
In:

No.	Pos.	Nation	Player
7	FW	NGA	Henry Onyekuru (on loan from (France) Monaco)
11	FW	TUR	Halil Dervişoğlu (on loan from (England) Brentford)
22	DF	USA	DeAndre Yedlin (from (England) Newcastle United)
31	FW	EGY	Mostafa Mohamed (on loan from (Egypt) Zamalek)
83	MF	POR	Gedson Fernandes (on loan from (Portugal) Benfica, previously on loan at (England) Tottenham Hotspur)

Out:

No.	Pos.	Nation	Player
10	MF	MAR	Younès Belhanda (released)
77	MF	NGA	Jesse Sekidika (on loan to Konyaspor)
80	FW	TUR	Ali Yavuz Kol (on loan to Denizlispor)
90	FW	SEN	Mbaye Diagne (on loan to (England) West Bromwich Albion)

=== Gaziantep ===
In:

No.	Pos.	Nation	Player
14	MF	TUR	Bilal Başaçıkoğlu (from Trabzonspor)
15	DF	TUR	Ertuğrul Ersoy (on loan from (France) Le Havre)
24	DF	POR	Roderick Miranda (from (England) Wolverhampton Wanderers)
32	MF	IRQ	Osama Rashid (from (Portugal) Santa Clara)

Out:

No.	Pos.	Nation	Player
5	DF	TUR	Kubilay Aktaş (to Denizlispor)
23	MF	TUR	Mehmet Erdem Uğurlu (released)

=== Gençlerbirliği ===
In:

No.	Pos.	Nation	Player
70	MF	AUT	Srđan Spiridonović (on loan from (Serbia) Red Star Belgrade)
-	DF	TUR	Mustafa Akbaş (from Yeni Malatyaspor)
-	MF	ARG	Lucas Mugni (from (Brazil) Sport Recife)
-	FW	BRA	Sandro Lima (from (China) Tianjin Jinmen Tiger)

Out:

No.	Pos.	Nation	Player
5	DF	TUR	Berat Özdemir (to Trabzonspor)
77	MF	TUR	Mustafa Çeçenoğlu (on loan to Boluspor)

=== Göztepe ===
In:

No.	Pos.	Nation	Player
18	FW	MKD	Adis Jahović (from Antalyaspor)
29	MF	MLI	Fousseni Diabaté (on loan from Trabzonspor)
32	MF	AUT	Peter Žulj (on loan from (Belgium) Anderlecht)
-	MF	NGA	Anderson Esiti (on loan from (Greece) PAOK)

Out:

No.	Pos.	Nation	Player

=== Hatayspor ===
In:

No.	Pos.	Nation	Player
—	DF	MLI	Youssouf Koné (on loan from (France) Lyon)

Out:

No.	Pos.	Nation	Player

=== İstanbul Başakşehir ===
In:

No.	Pos.	Nation	Player
2	DF	BRA	Léo Duarte (on loan from (Italy) Milan)
9	FW	CHI	Junior Fernandes (from (United Arab Emirates) Al-Ittihad)
28	MF	TUR	Tolga Ciğerci (from Fenerbahçe)
42	MF	TUR	Ömer Ali Şahiner (from Konyaspor)
55	MF	BDI	Youssouf Ndayishimiye (from Yeni Malatyaspor)

Out:

No.	Pos.	Nation	Player
17	MF	TUR	İrfan Kahveci (to Fenerbahçe])
29	MF	TUR	Kerim Frei (to (Netherlands) Emmen)

=== Kasımpaşa ===
In:

No.	Pos.	Nation	Player
4	MF	ENG	Danny Drinkwater (on loan from (England) Chelsea)
13	DF	SRB	Duško Tošić (from (China) Guangzhou City)
26	MF	CRO	Kristijan Bistrović (on loan from (Russia) CSKA Moscow)
21	DF	NED	Derrick Luckassen (on loan from (Netherlands) PSV, previously on loan at (Belgium) Anderlecht)
92	FW	SWE	Isaac Kiese Thelin (on loan from (Belgium) Anderlecht)

Out:

No.	Pos.	Nation	Player
17	DF	TUR	Ahmet Oğuz (to Sivasspor)
24	DF	BEL	Mickaël Tirpan (on loan to (Netherlands) Fortuna Sittard)
-	MF	NOR	Tobias Heintz (to (Sweden) BK Häcken, previously on loan at (Norway) Sarpsborg 08)

=== Kayserispor ===
In:

No.	Pos.	Nation	Player
2	DF	ARG	Nehuén Paz (on loan from (Italy) Bologna)
15	DF	TUR	Uğur Demirok (from Konyaspor)
20	MF	TUR	Ramazan Civelek (from Fatih Karagümrük)
42	FW	NED	Kevin Luckassen (from (Romania) Viitorul Constanța)
44	MF	SWE	Besard Šabović (from (Sweden) Mjällby)
73	MF	CRO	Karlo Muhar (from (Poland) Lech Poznań)
99	FW	CRO	Anton Maglica (from (China) Guizhou)

Out:

No.	Pos.	Nation	Player
89	MF	GHA	Yaw Ackah (on loan to BB Erzurumspor)
-	MF	TUR	Hasan Hüseyin Acar (to Alanyaspor)

=== Konyaspor ===
In:

No.	Pos.	Nation	Player
3	DF	TUR	Emre Kartal (from 1922 Konyaspor)
14	MF	KOS	Zymer Bytyqi (from (Norway) Viking)
20	MF	TUR	İsmail Güven (from 1922 Konyaspor)
24	FW	TUR	Doğan Gölpek (from 1922 Konyaspor)
26	DF	TUR	Barış Yardımcı (from Sivasspor)
27	MF	CIV	Ismaël Diomandé (from Çaykur Rizespor)
29	MF	BIH	Amar Rahmanović (from (Bosnia and Herzegovina) Sarajevo)
71	MF	NGA	Jesse Sekidika (on loan from Galatasaray)
-	FW	TUR	Ertuğrul Tekşen (from (Denmark) Lyngby)

Out:

No.	Pos.	Nation	Player
1	GK	TUR	Serkan Kırıntılı (to Alanyaspor)
7	MF	TUR	Ömer Ali Şahiner (to İstanbul Başakşehir)
10	MF	PER	Paolo Hurtado (to (Bulgaria) Lokomotiv Plovdiv)
15	DF	TUR	Uğur Demirok (to Kayserispor)
-	DF	TUR	Yağız Efe (to 1922 Konyaspor)
-	MF	TUR	Mehmet Ali Büyüksayar (on loan to 1922 Konyaspor)
-	MF	TUR	Selim Dilli (on loan to 1922 Konyaspor)
-	MF	TUR	Oğuzhan Eskiköy (to 1922 Konyaspor)
-	MF	TUR	Mücahit Kaya (to 1922 Konyaspor)
-	MF	TUR	Abdül Samet Kaya (to 1922 Konyaspor)
-	MF	TUR	Şener Kaya (on loan to 1922 Konyaspor)
-	FW	TUR	Ertuğrul Tekşen (on loan to 1922 Konyaspor)

=== Sivasspor ===
In:

No.	Pos.	Nation	Player
15	DF	TUR	Alaaddin Okumuş (from Ümraniyespor)
77	DF	TUR	Ahmet Oğuz (from Kasımpaşa)
99	FW	USA	Tyler Boyd (on loan from Beşiktaş)

Out:

No.	Pos.	Nation	Player
10	MF	TUR	Yasin Öztekin (released)
26	DF	TUR	Barış Yardımcı (to Konyaspor)
87	DF	BRA	Marcelo Goiano (released)

=== Trabzonspor ===
In:

No.	Pos.	Nation	Player
2	DF	TUR	Berat Özdemir (from Gençlerbirliği)
29	MF	TUR	Yunus Mallı (from (Germany) VfL Wolfsburg)

Out:

No.	Pos.	Nation	Player
17	MF	MLI	Fousseni Diabaté (on loan to Göztepe)
22	DF	ARG	Gastón Campi (on loan to Fatih Karagümrük)
45	MF	TUR	Bilal Başaçıkoğlu (to Gaziantep)
47	DF	POR	João Pereira (released)

=== Yeni Malatyaspor ===
In:

No.	Pos.	Nation	Player

Out:

No.	Pos.	Nation	Player
15	DF	TUR	Mustafa Akbaş (to Gençlerbirliği)
55	MF	BDI	Youssouf Ndayishimiye (to İstanbul Başakşehir)
