= Doğan Gölpek =

Dutch footballer

Personal information
- Full name: Doğan Can Gölpek
- Date of birth: 27 November 1994 (age 31)
- Place of birth: Bergen op Zoom, Netherlands
- Height: 1.90 m (6 ft 3 in)
- Position: Forward

Team information
- Current team: Groene Ster
- Number: 10

Youth career
- –2011: MVV
- 2011–2013: Fortuna Sittard

Senior career*
| Years | Team | Apps | (Gls) |
| 2013–2017 | Meerssen | | |
| 2017–2019 | MVV | 45 | (3) |
| 2019–2021 | 1922 Konyaspor | 24 | (5) |
| 2021 | Konyaspor | 2 | (0) |
| 2021–2022 | Adiyaman FK | 12 | (0) |
| 2022 | Hacettepe | 15 | (2) |
| 2022 | Belisia Bilzen | 2 | (0) |
| 2023–2024 | Diest | 17 | (3) |
| 2024– | Groene Ster | | |
- * Club domestic league appearances and goals as of 17:19, 4 August 2025 (UTC)

Doğan Can Gölpek (born 27 November 1994) is a Dutch professional footballer who plays as a forward for Derde Divisie club Groene Ster.

== Club career ==
Gölpek began his career with the amateur side SV Meerssen, and after 4 successful seasons with them moved to MVV Maastricht in the Tweede Divisie. He made his Eerste Divisie debut for MVV Maastricht on 18 August 2017 in a game against Go Ahead Eagles. He was recruited to the Turkish club 1922 Konyaspor. After a debut season marred by injuries, he recovered and had a successful sophomore year, earning him a transfer to the Süper Lig with Konyaspor.

He left Turkey for the Belgian lower leagues when he joined Belisia Bilzen and moved on to Diest in 2023. He returned to the Netherlands in 2024 when he was snapped up by Groene Ster.

== Personal life ==
Born in the Netherlands, Gölpek is of Turkish descent.
