= Marlos Moreno =

Colombian footballer (born 1996)

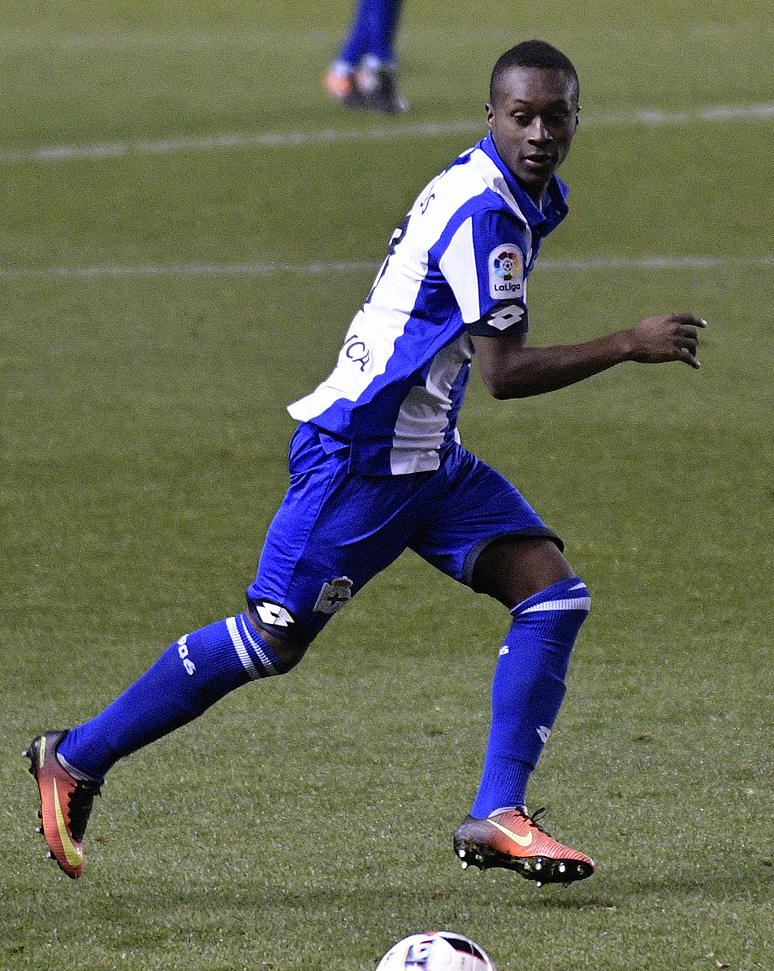
- Marlos with Deportivo La Coruña in 2017

Personal information
- Full name: Marlos Moreno Durán
- Date of birth: 20 September 1996 (age 30)
- Place of birth: Medellín, Colombia
- Height: 1.71 m (5 ft 7 in)
- Position: Forward

Team information
- Current team: Atlético Nacional
- Number: 7

Youth career
- 2010–2014: Atlético Nacional

Senior career*
Years	Team	Apps	(Gls)
2014–2016	Atlético Nacional	27	(5)
2016–2022	Manchester City	0	(0)
2016–2017	→ Deportivo La Coruña (loan)	19	(0)
2017–2018	→ Girona (loan)	2	(0)
2018	→ Flamengo (loan)	21	(1)
2019	→ Santos Laguna (loan)	11	(1)
2019–2020	→ Portimonense (loan)	16	(0)
2020–2021	→ Lommel (loan)	23	(5)
2021–2022	→ Kortrijk (loan)	32	(2)
2022–2023	Troyes	2	(0)
2022	Troyes II	1	(0)
2023	→ Konyaspor (loan)	12	(1)
2023–2024	Konyaspor	29	(2)
2024–2025	Tenerife	23	(0)
2025–	Atlético Nacional	20	(1)

International career^{‡}
2013	Colombia U17	3	(1)
2016	Colombia	8	(1)
Medal record
Colombia
Copa América Centenario
Bronze medal – third place	2016 United States
- * Club domestic league appearances and goals as of 11 December 2025 ‡ National team caps and goals as of 7 September 2016

Marlos Moreno Durán (Spanish pronunciation: [ˈmaɾlos moˈɾeno]; born 20 September 1996) is a Colombian professional footballer who plays as a forward for Categoría Primera A club Atlético Nacional

Moreno began his career with Atlético Nacional before joining Premier League side Manchester City for £4.75 million in 2016. During a six-year spell with City he failed to make a first team appearance and was never selected for a matchday squad, instead spending his tenure in with the Blues on loan at Deportivo La Coruña, Girona, Flamengo, Santos Laguna, Portimonense, Lommel and Kortrijk.

He has been capped eight times by Colombia but has not been selected for a national squad since 2016.

== Club career ==
=== Atlético Nacional ===
Born in Medellín, Moreno joined Atlético Nacional's youth setup in 2010, aged 14. On 23 July 2014, he made his first team debut, coming on as a second-half substitute for Rodin Quiñónes in a 3–1 Copa Colombia away win against Rionegro Águilas.

Moreno made his Categoría Primera A debut on 15 October 2014, starting in a 2–1 loss at Deportivo Pasto. He scored his first professional goal on 10 September of the following year, netting the second in a 3–0 home win against Deportivo Cali.

On 17 October 2015, Moreno scored a brace in a 4–0 away routing of Atlético Junior. He also started in the season's final against the same team, scoring from 30 seconds and helping his team to win its first title of the year; it was also the fastest goal of the club's history.

=== Manchester City ===
On 6 August 2016, Moreno signed for Manchester City for £4.75 million and was immediately loaned out to Deportivo de La Coruña, in a season-long deal.

Moreno made his debut for Deportivo on 11 September, in a 1–0 loss to Athletic Bilbao.

Moreno was loaned to La Liga side Girona FC for the first half of the 2017–18 season. On 12 January 2018, Moreno was loaned out to Brazilian Série A club Flamengo until 31 December 2018.

On 25 January 2019, Moreno was loaned to Mexican side Santos Laguna. On 31 July 2019, Moreno was loaned to Portuguese Primeira Liga club Portimonense on a one-year deal.

Moreno was loaned to Lommel, another club owned by the City Football Group, for the 2020–21 season. Moreno was loaned to Belgian side Kortrijk for the 2021–22 season.

=== Troyes ===
After spending six years at Manchester City without making an appearance, Moreno signed a two-year contract with fellow City Football Group club Troyes on 1 September 2022.

=== Konyaspor ===
On 3 March 2023, Moreno joined Konyaspor on loan until the end of the 2022–23 season. He signed a permanent 2+1 year contract on 1 August.

=== Tenerife ===
On 4 September 2024, free agent Moreno returned to Spain after joining CD Tenerife in Segunda División on a two-year deal.

=== Atlético Nacional ===
On 28 July 2025, Marlos Moreno returned to his first club as a professional, Atlético Nacional. He scored his first goal after returning on 16 August in a 2–2 draw against Fortaleza.

== International career ==
After representing Colombia at under-17 level, Moreno was called up to the main squad on 11 February 2016. He made his full international debut on 24 March, coming on as 85th-minute substitute for Juan Cuadrado and setting up Edwin Cardona's last-minute winner. On 11 June 2016, Moreno scored his first international goal against Costa Rica in the Copa America Centenario.

== Career statistics ==
=== Club ===
As of 1 May 2024

Appearances and goals by club, season and competition
Club	Season	League			Cup		Continental		Other		Total	
Club	Season	Division	Apps	Goals	Apps	Goals	Apps	Goals	Apps	Goals	Apps	Goals
Atlético Nacional	2014	Categoría Primera A	1	0	2	0	—		—		3	0
Atlético Nacional	2015	Categoría Primera A	17	5	—		—		—		17	5
Atlético Nacional	2016	Categoría Primera A	9	0	—		13 (Note: Appearances in Copa Libertadores)	3	1 (Note: Appearance in Superliga Colombiana)	0	23	3
Atlético Nacional	Total		27	5	2	0	13	3	1	0	43	8
Deportivo (loan)	2016–17	La Liga	19	0	4	0	—		—		23	0
Girona (loan)	2017–18	La Liga	2	0	2	0	—		—		4	0
Flamengo (loan)	2018	Série A	21	1	5	0	5	0	4 (Note: Appearances in Campeonato Carioca)	0	36	1
Santos Laguna (loan)	2018-19	Liga MX	11	1	0	0	6 (Note: Appearances in CONCACAF Champions League)	2	—		17	3
Portimonense (loan)	2019–20	Primeira Liga	16	0	3	0	—		—		19	0
Lommel (loan)	2020–21	Challenger Pro League	23	5	2	1	—		—		25	6
Kortrijk (loan)	2021–22	Belgian Pro League	32	2	2	0	—		—		34	2
Troyes	2022–23	Ligue 1	2	0	1	0	—		—		3	0
Troyes II	2022–23	Championnat National 3	1	0	—		—		—		1	0
Konyaspor (loan)	2022–23	Süper Lig	12	1	0	0	—		—		12	1
Konyaspor	2023–24	Süper Lig	28	2	3	0	—		—		31	2
Konyaspor	Total		40	3	3	0	0	0	0	0	43	3
Career Total			194	17	12	1	24	5	5	0	295	23

=== International ===
As of 5 October 2016

Appearances and goals by national team and year
Colombia
Year	Apps	Goals
2016	8	1
Total	8	1

=== International goals ===
As of match played 11 June 2016. Colombia score listed first, score column indicates score after each Moreno goal.

International goals by date, venue, cap, opponent, score, result and competition
No.	Date	Venue	Cap	Opponent	Score	Result	Competition
1	11 June 2016	NRG Stadium, Houston, United States	5	Costa Rica	2–3	2–3	Copa América Centenario

== Honours ==
=== Club ===
Atlético Nacional

- Categoría Primera A: 2015–II
- Superliga Colombiana: 2016
- Copa Libertadores: 2016

=== International ===
Colombia

- Copa América: third place 2016
