= Guilherme (footballer, born April 1990) =

Brazilian professional footballer

Personal information
- Full name: Guilherme Haubert Sityá
- Date of birth: 1 April 1990 (age 36)
- Place of birth: Porto Alegre, Brazil
- Height: 1.79 m (5 ft 10 in)
- Position: Left-back

Youth career
- –2010: Porto Alegre

Senior career*
Years	Team	Apps	(Gls)
2011	Porto Alegre	13	(0)
2011	Caxias	1	(0)
2012	Concordia Chiajna	16	(0)
2012–2015	Petrolul Ploiești	66	(0)
2014–2015	→ Greuther Fürth (loan)	4	(0)
2015–2016	Steaua București	35	(0)
2016–2017	Termalica Nieciecza	25	(0)
2017–2020	Jagiellonia Białystok	77	(2)
2020–2026	Konyaspor	210	(12)
- * Club domestic league appearances and goals as of 17 May 2026

Guilherme Haubert Sityá (born 1 April 1990), known as Guilherme (Brazilian Portuguese: [ɡiˈʎɛʁmi]), or Guilherme Sityá, is a Brazilian professional footballer who plays as a left-back.

== Career ==
After starting his senior career in native Brazil, Guilherme moved to Europe at age 21 and represented various sides in Romania, Germany, Poland and Turkey. In the former country, he appeared in over 100 Liga I matches and won four domestic trophies with Petrolul Ploiești and Steaua București combined.

On 5 June 2017, he signed a contract with Jagiellonia Białystok.

Guilherme also made over 100 Ekstraklasa appearances for Termalica Nieciecza and Jagiellonia Białystok in Poland, before moving to Süper Lig team Konyaspor.

== Career statistics ==
As of match played 14 February 2026

Appearances and goals by club, season and competition
Club	Season	League			National cup (Note: Includes Cupa României, DFB-Pokal, Polish Cup, Turkish Cup)		League cup (Note: Includes Cupa Ligii)		Continental		Other		Total	
Club	Season	Division	Apps	Goals	Apps	Goals	Apps	Goals	Apps	Goals	Apps	Goals	Apps	Goals
Porto Alegre	2011		13	0	—		—		—		—		13	0
Caxias	2011	Série C	1	0	—		—		—		—		1	0
Concordia Chiajna	2011–12	Liga I	16	0	—		—		—		—		16	0
Petrolul Ploiești	2012–13	Liga I	32	0	5	0	—		—		—		37	0
Petrolul Ploiești	2013–14	Liga I	34	0	4	0	—		6 (Note: Appearances in UEFA Europa League)	0	1 (Note: Appearance in Supercupa României)	0	45	0
Petrolul Ploiești	Total		66	0	9	0	—		6	0	1	0	82	0
Greuther Fürth	2014–15	2. Bundesliga	4	0	1	0	—		—		—		5	0
Steaua București	2014–15	Liga I	15	0	2	0	1	0	—		—		18	0
Steaua București	2015–16	Liga I	20	0	2	0	1	0	5 (Note: Three appearances in UEFA Champions League, two appearances in UEFA Europa League)	0	0	0	28	0
Steaua București	Total		35	0	4	0	2	0	5	0	0	0	46	0
Bruk-Bet Termalica Nieciecza	2016–17	Ekstraklasa	25	0	0	0	—		—		—		25	0
Jagiellonia Białystok	2017–18	Ekstraklasa	30	0	1	0	—		4	0	—		35	0
Jagiellonia Białystok	2018–19	Ekstraklasa	34	2	5	1	—		4	0	—		43	3
Jagiellonia Białystok	2019–20	Ekstraklasa	13	0	1	0	—		—		—		14	0
Jagiellonia Białystok	Total		77	2	6	0	—		8	0	—		91	3
Konyaspor	2019–20	Süper Lig	9	0	0	0	—		—		—		9	0
Konyaspor	2020–21	Süper Lig	36	1	2	0	—		—		—		38	1
Konyaspor	2021–22	Süper Lig	38	4	1	0	—		—		—		39	4
Konyaspor	2022–23	Süper Lig	34	2	1	0	—		4 (Note: Appearances in UEFA Europa Conference League)	1	—		39	3
Konyaspor	2023–24	Süper Lig	37	5	2	0	—		—		—		39	5
Konyaspor	2024–25	Süper Lig	34	0	3	0	—		—		—		37	0
Konyaspor	2025–26	Süper Lig	22	0	3	0	—		—		—		25	0
Konyaspor	Total		210	12	12	0	—		4	1	—		226	13
Career total			447	14	32	1	2	0	23	1	1	0	505	16

== Honours ==
Petrolul Ploiești

- Cupa României: 2012–13
- Supercupa României runner-up: 2013

Steaua București

- Liga I: 2014–15
- Cupa României: 2014–15
- Supercupa României runner-up: 2015
- Cupa Ligii: 2014–15

Jagiellonia Białystok

- Polish Cup runner-up: 2018–19
