= Francisco Calvo =

Costa Rican football player (born 1992)

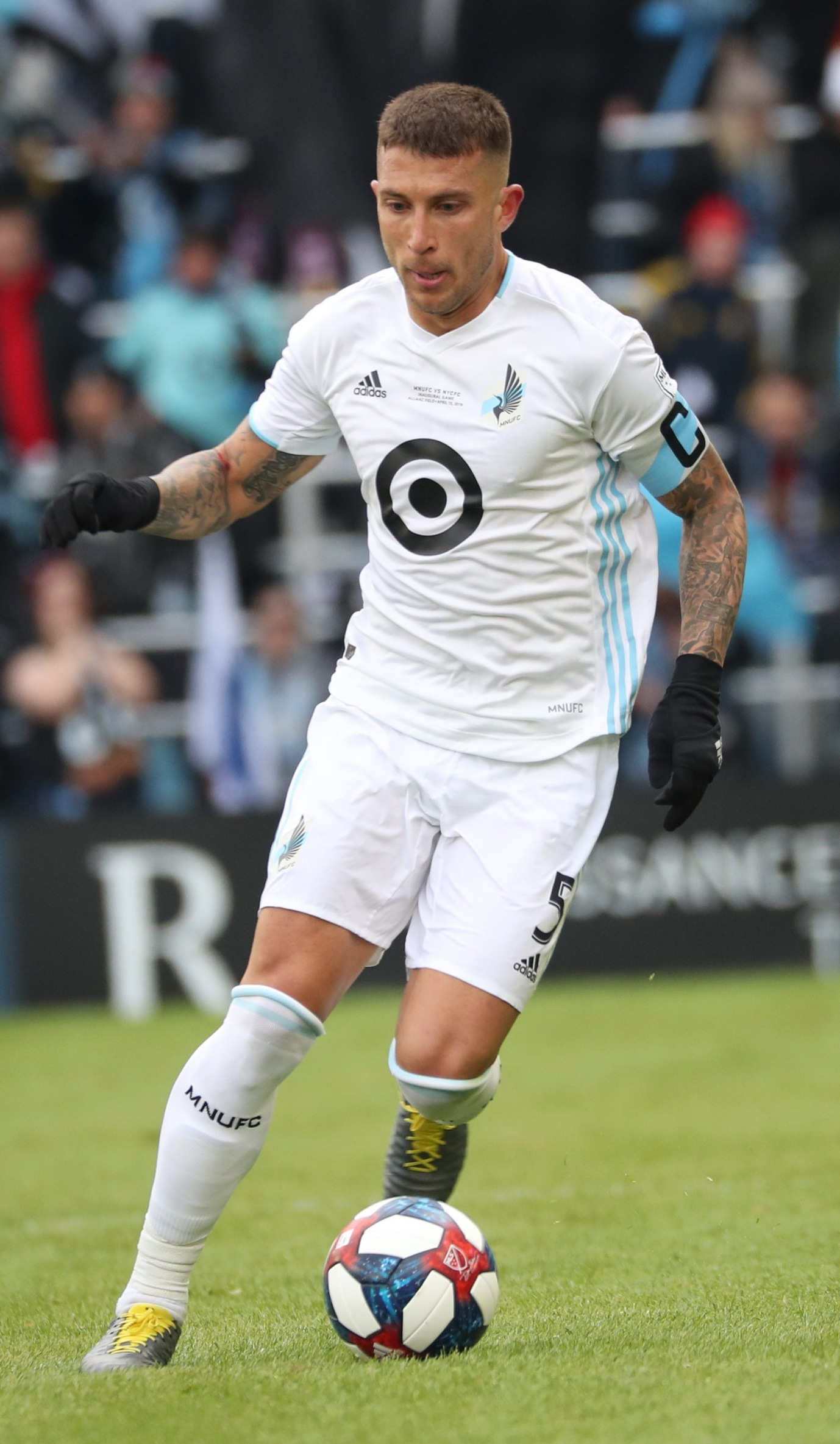
- Calvo with Minnesota United in 2019

Personal information
- Full name: Francisco Javier Calvo Quesada
- Date of birth: 8 July 1992 (age 34)
- Place of birth: San José, Costa Rica
- Height: 1.80 m (5 ft 11 in)
- Position: Centre-back

Team information
- Current team: Nacional
- Number: 5

Youth career
- 2005–2010: Saprissa

College career
Years	Team	Apps	(Gls)
2010	San Jacinto Coyotes	14	(5)

Senior career*
Years	Team	Apps	(Gls)
2011–2012	Herediano	23	(1)
2012	Pérez Zeledón	21	(5)
2013	Nordsjælland	3	(0)
2013–2015	Herediano	49	(6)
2015	→ Santos de Guápiles (loan)	21	(5)
2015–2016	Saprissa	63	(14)
2017–2019	Minnesota United	60	(5)
2019–2021	Chicago Fire	62	(5)
2022	San Jose Earthquakes	13	(2)
2022–2023	Konyaspor	48	(3)
2024	Juárez	17	(1)
2024–2025	Hatayspor	25	(1)
2025–2026	Al-Ettifaq	30	(4)
2026–	Nacional	10	(3)

International career^{‡}
2011	Costa Rica U20	4	(1)
2011–	Costa Rica	119	(16)
- * Club domestic league appearances and goals as of 20 September 2026 ‡ National team caps and goals as of 03:52, 5 October 2026 (UTC)

Francisco Javier Calvo Quesada (Spanish pronunciation: [fɾanˈθisko xaˈβjeɾ ˈkalβo keˈsaða]; born 8 July 1992) is a Costa Rican professional footballer who plays as a centre-back for Nacional the Costa Rica national team.

== Early life ==
After starting with Deportivo Saprissa as a youth player from 2005 to 2010, Calvo moved to the United States to study at San Jacinto College after getting a scholarship and played football at university level during that period.

== Club career ==
On his return to Costa Rica in 2011, Calvo played for Herediano before a stint at Pérez Zeledón where he scored 5 goals in 21 matches. In January 2013 he moved abroad to play for then Danish champions Nordsjælland but he returned to Herediano in summer 2013. In January 2015, Calvo joined Santos de Guápiles as a loan.

In late May 2015, Calvo joined Saprissa. In his first season with Saprissa, he appeared in 39 matches and scored five goals. The following season, he continued to be a set-piece threat as he scored 9 goals in 24 matches playing as a defender.

On 27 December 2016, Calvo joined Major League Soccer side Minnesota United FC. In 2018, Calvo was selected as an MLS All-Star, becoming the first Minnesota United player in club history to receive the honor.

On 3 May 2019, Calvo was traded to Chicago Fire. Following the 2021 season, Calvo's contract option was declined by Chicago.

On 26 January 2022, Calvo signed as a free agent with San Jose Earthquakes. On 5 March 2022, Calvo scored two late set piece goals for a ten-man San Jose team to salvage a 3–3 draw at home against the Columbus Crew. This performance led to him being named in the MLS Team of the Week. He then moved to Konyaspor in the Turkish Süper Lig.

On 15 January 2024, Calvo signed with Juárez in Mexico. On 31 March 2024, he notches his first goal for the club by scoring a header contributing a 2–1 win against Santos Laguna.

On 5 August 2025, Calvo joined Saudi Pro League club Al-Ettifaq.

In July 2026, Calvo joined Uruguayan club Nacional. His debut game came on 11 July 2026 versus Danubio.

== International career ==
On 29 May 2011, Calvo made his debut with the Costa Rica senior team in San José in a friendly game against Nigeria. He was also part of the Costa Rica squad at the 2011 FIFA U-20 World Cup.

Calvo was also a reserve call-up for Costa Rica at the 2011 CONCACAF Gold Cup, and later impressed senior head coach Ricardo La Volpe to win him a call-up for the Costa Rica squad at the 2011 Copa América. He made his debut in the competition in a game against Colombia, which ended in a 1–0 loss, and played in a 2–0 win against Bolivia. also he played Argentina in a 3–0 loss.

In May 2018, Calvo was named in Costa Rica's 23-man squad for the 2018 FIFA World Cup in Russia. He later reprised the same role at the 2022 FIFA World Cup in Qatar.

On 15 October 2024, he featured in his 100th international match for Costa Rica in a 3–0 victory over Guatemala during the CONCACAF Nations League A.

== Career statistics ==
=== Club ===
As of match played 20 September 2026

Appearances and goals by club, season and competition
Club	Season	League			Cup		Continental		Other		Total	
Club	Season	Division	Apps	Goals	Apps	Goals	Apps	Goals	Apps	Goals	Apps	Goals
Herediano	2011–12	Liga FPD	23	1	—		3 (Note: Appearance(s) in CONCACAF Champions League)	0	—		26	1
Pérez Zeledón	2012–13	Liga FPD	21	5	—		—		—		21	5
Nordsjælland	2012–13	Danish Superliga	3	0	0	0	—		—		3	0
Herediano	2013–14	Liga FPD	29	3	—		1	0	—		30	3
Herediano	2014–15	Liga FPD	20	3	—		4	1	—		24	4
Herediano	Total		72	7	0	0	8	1	—		80	8
Santos (loan)	2014–15	Liga FPD	21	5	—		—		—		21	5
Saprissa	2015–16	Liga FPD	39	5	—		4	0	—		43	5
Saprissa	2016–17	Liga FPD	24	9	0	0	4	1	—		28	10
Saprissa	Total		63	14	0	0	8	1	—		71	15
Minnesota United	2017	Major League Soccer	27	2	0	0	—		—		27	2
Minnesota United	2018	Major League Soccer	26	2	0	0	—		—		26	2
Minnesota United	2019	Major League Soccer	7	1	—		—		—		7	1
Minnesota United	Total		60	5	0	0	—		—		60	5
Chicago Fire	2019	Major League Soccer	23	3	0	0	—		1 (Note: Appearance(s) in Leagues Cup)	0	24	3
Chicago Fire	2020	Major League Soccer	22	1	—		—		—		22	1
Chicago Fire	2021	Major League Soccer	17	1	—		—		—		17	1
Chicago Fire	Total		45	4	0	0	—		1	0	46	4
San Jose Earthquakes	2022	Major League Soccer	13	2	2	0	—		—		15	2
Konyaspor	2022–23	Süper Lig	31	3	2	0	4 (Note: Appearance(s) in UEFA Europa Conference League)	0	—		37	3
Konyaspor	2023–24	Süper Lig	17	0	1	0	—		—		18	0
Konyaspor	Total		48	3	3	0	4	0	—		55	3
Juárez	2023–24	Liga MX	14	1	0	0	—		—		14	1
Juárez	2024–25	Liga MX	3	0	0	0	—		—		3	0
Juárez	Total		17	1	0	0	—		—		17	1
Hatayspor	2024–25	Süper Lig	25	1	1	0	—		—		26	1
Al-Ettifaq	2025–26	Saudi Pro League	30	4	1	0	—		—		31	4
Nacional	2026	Liga AUF Uruguaya	10	3	1	0	2 (Note: Appearance(s) in Copa Sudamericana)	0	—		13	3
Career total			428	54	8	0	22	2	1	0	459	56

=== International ===
As of match played 4 October 2026

Appearances and goals by national team and year
National team	Year	Apps	Goals
Costa Rica	2011	3	0
Costa Rica	2012	0	0
Costa Rica	2013	0	0
Costa Rica	2014	0	0
Costa Rica	2015	8	0
Costa Rica	2016	6	0
Costa Rica	2017	16	3
Costa Rica	2018	11	1
Costa Rica	2019	6	2
Costa Rica	2020	1	0
Costa Rica	2021	16	1
Costa Rica	2022	10	1
Costa Rica	2023	11	3
Costa Rica	2024	14	3
Costa Rica	2025	13 (Note: Includes a non-FIFA friendly played against Catalonia, which is counted as an official match by the Costa Rican Football Federation.)	2
Costa Rica	2026	4	0
Total		119	16

Scores and results list Costa Rica's goal tally first.

List of international goals scored by Francisco Calvo
No.	Date	Venue	Opponent	Score	Result	Competition
1	20 January 2017	Estadio Rommel Fernández, Panama City, Panama	Honduras	1–1	1–1	2017 Copa Centroamericana
2	13 June 2017	Estadio Nacional, San José, Costa Rica	Trinidad and Tobago	1–0	2–1	2018 FIFA World Cup qualification
3	11 July 2017	BBVA Compass Stadium, Houston, United States	Canada	1–1	1–1	2017 CONCACAF Gold Cup
4	3 June 2018	Estadio Nacional, San José, Costa Rica	Northern Ireland	3–0	3–0	Friendly
5	14 November 2019	Ergilio Hato Stadium, Willemstad, Curaçao	Curaçao	2–1	2–1	2019–20 CONCACAF Nations League A
6	17 November 2019	Estadio Ricardo Saprissa Aymá, San José, Costa Rica	Haiti	1–0	1–1	2019–20 CONCACAF Nations League A
7	6 June 2021	Empower Field at Mile High, Denver, United States	Honduras	2–2	2–2	2021 CONCACAF Nations League Finals
8	5 June 2022	Estadio Nacional, San José, Costa Rica	Martinique	2–0	2–0	2022–23 CONCACAF Nations League A
9	4 July 2023	Red Bull Arena, Harrison, United States	Martinique	2–1	6–4	2023 CONCACAF Gold Cup
10	8 September 2023	St James' Park, Newcastle upon Tyne, England	Saudi Arabia	1–0	3–1	Friendly
11	20 November 2023	Estadio Rommel Fernández, Panama City, Panama	Panama	1–3	1–3	2023–24 CONCACAF Nations League A
12	2 July 2024	Q2 Stadium, Austin, United States	Paraguay	1–0	2–1	2024 Copa América
13	5 September 2024	Estadio Nacional, San José, Costa Rica	Guadeloupe	1–0	3–0	2024–25 CONCACAF Nations League A
14	15 October 2024	Estadio Nacional, San José, Costa Rica	Guatemala	3–0	3–0	2024–25 CONCACAF Nations League A
15	29 June 2025	U.S. Bank Stadium, Minneapolis, United States	United States	1–0	2–2 (3–4 p)	2025 CONCACAF Gold Cup
16	14 October 2025	Estadio Nacional, San José, Costa Rica	Nicaragua	4–1	4–1	2026 FIFA World Cup qualification
Last updated 29 June 2025

== Honours ==
Individual

- MLS All-Star: 2018
- CONCACAF Nations League Finals Best XI: 2021

== See also ==
- List of men's footballers with 100 or more international caps
