= Kaan Özdemir =

Turkish footballer

Personal information
- Full name: Kadir Kaan Özdemir
- Date of birth: 1 March 1998 (age 28)
- Place of birth: Üsküdar, Turkey
- Height: 1.81 m (5 ft 11 in)
- Position: Left-back

Team information
- Current team: Büyükçekmece Tepecikspor
- Number: 4

Youth career
- 2010–2016: Fenerbahçe

Senior career*
Years	Team	Apps	(Gls)
2016–2017	Fenerbahçe	0	(0)
2017	→ Tuzlaspor (loan)	10	(0)
2017–2021	Konyaspor	1	(0)
2018–2020	→ 1922 Konyaspor (loan)	45	(7)
2020	→ Bayrampaşaspor (loan)	4	(0)
2020–2021	→ Kahramanmaraşspor (loan)	27	(0)
2021–2022	Şanlıurfaspor	3	(0)
2022	Dıyarbakır Spor	1	(0)
2022–2023	Nevşehir Belediyespor	12	(0)
2023–	Büyükçekmece Tepecikspor	2	(0)

International career
2012–2013	Turkey U15	8	(0)
2013–2014	Turkey U16	12	(1)
2014	Turkey U17	8	(0)
2015	Turkey U18	2	(0)
2016–2017	Turkey U19	8	(0)
2018–2019	Turkey U21	3	(0)
- * Club domestic league appearances and goals as of 1 October 2023

Kadir Kaan Özdemir (born 1 March 1998) is a Turkish professional footballer who plays as a left-back for TFF Third League club Büyükçekmece Tepecikspor.

== Professional career ==
Kadir Kaan made his professional debut for Fenerbahçe S.K. in a 2-2 Turkish Cup tie with Gençlerbirliği S.K. on 18 January 2017. He briefly joined Tuzlaspor on loan in the TFF Second League in 2017, and thereafter signed with Konyaspor on 22 July 2017. He made his Süper Lig debut for Konyaspor in a 2-0 win over Kardemir Karabükspor on 11 December 2017.
