= Konrad Michalak =

Polish footballer (born 1997)

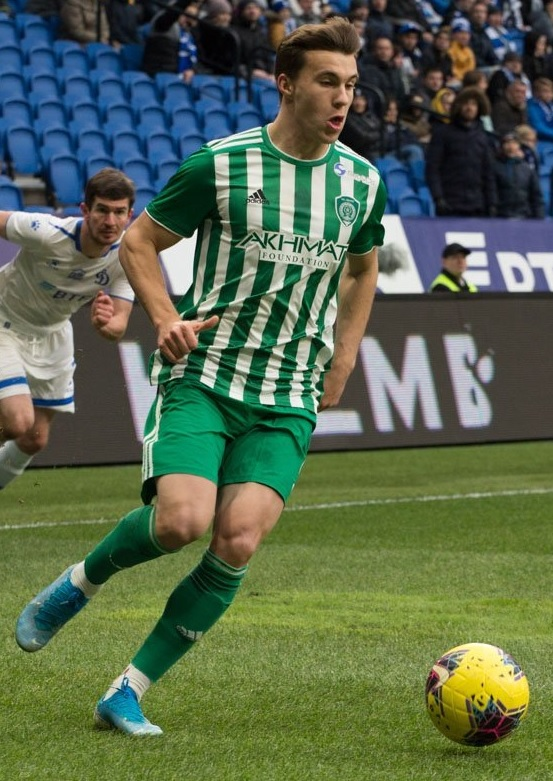
- Michalak playing for Akhmat Grozny in 2019

Personal information
- Full name: Konrad Hubert Michalak
- Date of birth: 19 September 1997 (age 29)
- Place of birth: Szprotawa, Poland
- Height: 1.74 m (5 ft 9 in)
- Position: Winger

Team information
- Current team: Eyüpspor
- Number: 77

Youth career
- 2006–2009: Czarni Żagań
- 2009–2013: UKP Zielona Góra
- 2013–2014: Legia Warsaw

Senior career*
Years	Team	Apps	(Gls)
2014–2016	Legia Warsaw II	57	(12)
2016–2018	Legia Warsaw	2	(0)
2017	→ Zagłębie Sosnowiec (loan)	15	(2)
2017–2018	→ Wisła Płock (loan)	29	(1)
2018–2019	Lechia Gdańsk	22	(1)
2019–2022	Akhmat Grozny	6	(0)
2020	→ Ankaragücü (loan)	14	(0)
2020–2021	→ Çaykur Rizespor (loan)	31	(2)
2021–2022	→ Konyaspor (loan)	35	(3)
2022–2023	Konyaspor	30	(0)
2023–2025	Ohod	31	(8)
2024–2025	→ Zamalek (loan)	6	(0)
2025–2026	Panetolikos	23	(3)
2026–	Eyüpspor	0	(0)

International career
2016–2017	Poland U20	8	(2)
2017–2019	Poland U21	15	(3)
- * Club domestic league appearances and goals as of 11:03, 1 June 2026 (UTC)

Konrad Hubert Michalak (born 19 September 1997) is a Polish professional footballer who plays as a winger for Süper Lig club Eyüpspor.

== Club career ==
Michalak started his career with Czarni Żagań, but joined UKP Zielona Góra in 2009 with a teammate from Czarni. He spent high school at a boarding school, where he and his roommate were two of the only Legia supporters, and would commute to training with UKP.

In 2013, Michalak joined boyhood club Legia Warsaw, and spent three years with the reserves, before making his debut in December 2016, coming on as an 82nd-minute substitute for Nemanja Nikolić.

On 10 February 2017, Michalak officially joined Zagłębie Sosnowiec on a six-month loan deal.

On 5 August 2017, he was loaned to Wisła Płock.

On 3 June 2019, he signed a four-year contract with the Russian Premier League club Akhmat Grozny. On 31 January 2020, Akhmat announced he joined Turkish team Ankaragücü on loan until the end of the season. On 24 August 2020, he moved on loan to another Turkish club Çaykur Rizespor. On 17 August 2021, he was loaned to Konyaspor for the 2021–22 season.

On 12 September 2023, Michalak moved to Saudi First Division League side Ohod for a reported fee of €1 million.

Exactly a year after joining Ohod, he joined Egyptian Premier League club Zamalek on a season-long loan.

On 4 August 2025, Michalak signed for Super League Greece club Panetolikos.

On 3 July 2026, Michalski agreed to join Turkish top-flight side Eyüpspor on a free transfer.

== International career ==
Michalak was first called up to the Poland under 20 side in September 2016, and scored on his debut against Switzerland. He was called up again in March 2017 for a friendly game against Italy. Because of his call up, which coincided with call-ups for teammates Sebastian Milewski and Robert Bartczak, his club side, Sosnowiec's game against Górnik Zabrze had to be postponed as Sosnowiec would not have had enough fit senior players.

He was called up to the senior Poland squad for a friendly match with Scotland on 24 March 2022 and the 2022 FIFA World Cup qualification playoff against Sweden on 29 March 2022.

== Career statistics ==
As of matches played 2 May 2026

Appearances and goals by club, season and competition
Club	Season	League			National cup (Note: Includes Polish Cup, Russian Cup, Turkish Cup, King's Cup, Greek Cup)		Continental		Other		Total	
Club	Season	Division	Apps	Goals	Apps	Goals	Apps	Goals	Apps	Goals	Apps	Goals
Legia Warsaw II	2013–14	III liga, gr. A	2	0	—		—		—		2	0
Legia Warsaw II	2014–15	III liga, gr. A	15	1	—		—		—		15	1
Legia Warsaw II	2015–16	III liga, gr. A	27	9	—		—		—		27	9
Legia Warsaw II	2016–17	III liga, gr. I	13	2	—		—		—		13	2
Legia Warsaw II	Total		57	12	—		—		—		57	12
Legia Warsaw	2016–17	Ekstraklasa	1	0	0	0	0	0	0	0	1	0
Legia Warsaw	2017–18	Ekstraklasa	0	0	0	0	2 (Note: Appearances in UEFA Champions League)	1	0	0	2	1
Legia Warsaw	2018–19	Ekstraklasa	1	0	0	0	0	0	0	0	1	0
Legia Warsaw	Total		2	0	0	0	2	1	0	0	4	1
Zagłębie Sosnowiec (loan)	2016–17	I liga	15	2	0	0	—		—		15	2
Wisła Płock (loan)	2017–18	Ekstraklasa	29	1	1	0	—		—		30	1
Lechia Gdańsk	2018–19	Ekstraklasa	22	1	4	0	—		—		26	1
Akhmat Grozny	2019–20	RPL	6	0	2	1	—		—		8	1
Ankaragücü (loan)	2019–20	Süper Lig	14	0	—		—		—		14	0
Çaykur Rizespor (loan)	2020–21	Süper Lig	31	2	3	1	—		—		34	3
Konyaspor (loan)	2021–22	Süper Lig	35	3	3	1	—		—		38	4
Konyaspor	2022–23	Süper Lig	26	0	2	0	3 (Note: Appearances in UEFA Europa League)	1	—		31	1
Konyaspor	2023–24	Süper Lig	4	0	0	0	—		—		4	0
Konyaspor	Total		65	3	5	2	3	1	—		73	5
Ohod	2023–24	SFDL	28	7	1	1	—		—		29	8
Ohod	2024–25	SFDL	3	1	0	0	—		—		3	1
Ohod	Total		31	8	1	1	—		—		32	9
Zamalek (loan)	2024–25	EPL	6	0	0	0	5 (Note: Appearances in CAF Confederation Cup)	0	3 (Note: Two appearances in Egyptian Super Cup, one appearance in CAF Super Cup)	0	14	0
Panetolikos	2025–26	Super League Greece	23	2	4	0	—		—		27	2
Eyüpspor	2026–27	Süper Lig	0	0	0	0	—		—		0	0
Career total			301	31	20	5	10	2	3	0	334	38

== Honours ==
Lechia Gdańsk

- Polish Cup: 2018–19

Zamalek

- CAF Super Cup: 2024
