= İsmail Güven =

Turkish footballer

Personal information
- Date of birth: 16 April 1994 (age 32)
- Place of birth: Meram, Turkey
- Height: 1.72 m (5 ft 8 in)
- Position: Midfielder

Team information
- Current team: Kastamonuspor 1966
- Number: 8

Youth career
- 2004–2008: Konya GB
- 2008–2011: Konyaspor

Senior career*
Years	Team	Apps	(Gls)
2011–2018	Konyaspor	0	(0)
2014–2016	→ 1922 Konyaspor (loan)	67	(1)
2016–2017	→ Denizlispor (loan)	15	(0)
2018	→ Şanlıurfaspor (loan)	9	(1)
2018–2019	Altınordu	0	(0)
2018–2019	→ Niğde Anadolu (loan)	28	(1)
2019–2020	Zonguldak Kömürspor	26	(1)
2020–2021	1922 Konyaspor	17	(1)
2021	Konyaspor	1	(0)
2021–2023	İskenderunspor	65	(3)
2023–	Kastamonuspor 1966	5	(0)

International career^{‡}
2018–2019	Turkey U19	15	(0)
2019	Turkey U20	3	(0)
- * Club domestic league appearances and goals as of 1 October 2023 ‡ National team caps and goals as of 13 January 2021

İsmail Güven (born 16 April 1994) is a Turkish football player who plays as a midfielder for Kastamonuspor 1966 in the TFF Second League.

== Professional career ==
Güven signed his first contract with Konyaspor in 2011, and spent his early career on loan with various teams in the TFF First League and TFF Second League. He returned to Konyaspor, signing a contract on 8 January 2021. Güven made his professional debut with Konyaspor in a 2–1 Turkish Cup win over Gaziantep on 13 January 2021.
