= Barış Yardımcı =

Turkish footballer

Personal information
- Date of birth: 14 August 1992 (age 34)
- Place of birth: Malazgirt, Turkey
- Height: 1.77 m (5 ft 10 in)
- Position: Right-back

Youth career
- 2003–2004: Dudulluspor
- 2004–2006: Kartalspor
- 2006–2010: Fenerbahçe
- 2010–2011: Kasımpaşa

Senior career*
Years	Team	Apps	(Gls)
2011–2014	Hatayspor	71	(0)
2012–2013	→ Menemen Belediyespor (loan)	29	(0)
2014–2017	Gaziantepspor	88	(0)
2017–2019	Bursaspor	57	(1)
2019–2021	Sivasspor	10	(0)
2021-2023	Konyaspor	15	(0)
2023	Ankara Keçiörengücü	6	(0)

International career
2007	Turkey U15	2	(0)
2007–2008	Turkey U16	18	(1)
2008–2009	Turkey U17	11	(1)
2015	Turkey A2	1	(0)
2017	Turkey	2	(0)
- * Club domestic league appearances and goals as of 12 August 2023

Barış Yardımcı (born 14 August 1992) is a Turkish footballer who plays as a right-back.

== International career ==
Yardımcı has played at various youth levels for the Turkish Football Association. He made his senior debut for the Turkey senior national team in a friendly 2-0 loss to Romania on 9 November 2017.
