= Uğurcan Yazğılı =

Turkish footballer

Personal information
- Full name: Uğurcan Yazğılı
- Date of birth: 9 April 1999 (age 27)
- Place of birth: Hilvan, Turkey
- Position: Defender

Team information
- Current team: Konyaspor
- Number: 5

Youth career
- 2008–2013: Amed
- 2013–2017: Bucaspor

Senior career*
Years	Team	Apps	(Gls)
2017–2018	Bucaspor	36	(2)
2018–2020	Kasımpaşa	2	(0)
2020–2022	Adanaspor	52	(2)
2022–	Konyaspor	107	(4)

International career^{‡}
2017	Turkey U19	1	(0)
- * Club domestic league appearances and goals as of 1 June 2026 ‡ National team caps and goals as of 12 May 2019

Uğurcan Yazğılı (born 9 April 1999) is a Turkish football player who currently plays as a defender for Konyaspor.

== Professional career ==
Yazğılı began his senior career with Bucaspor in the TFF Second League. On 12 July 2019, Yazğılı signed a professional contract with Kasımpaşa. Yazğılı made his professional debut with Kasımpaşa in a 2-1 Süper Lig loss to Kayserispor on 12 May 2019. On 28 January 2022, he transferred to Konyaspor signing a 3.5 year contract.
