= Bruno Paz =

Angolan footballer

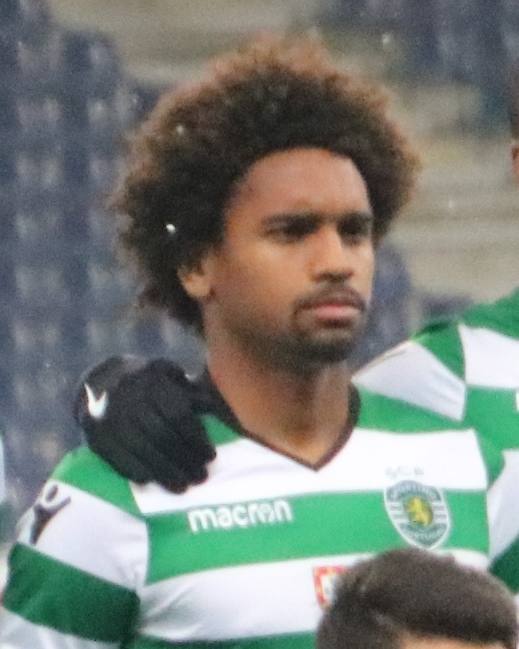
- Paz in 2018

Personal information
- Full name: Bruno Lourenço Pinto de Almeida Paz
- Date of birth: 23 April 1998 (age 28)
- Place of birth: Barreiro, Portugal
- Height: 1.80 m (5 ft 11 in)
- Position: Defensive midfielder

Team information
- Current team: Olympiakos Nicosia
- Number: 8

Youth career
- 2006–2008: Vinhense
- 2008–2010: Barreirense
- 2010–2011: Belenenses
- 2011–2016: Sporting CP

Senior career*
Years	Team	Apps	(Gls)
2016–2018	Sporting CP B	31	(0)
2018–2020	Sporting CP U23	10	(0)
2018–2022	Sporting CP	0	(0)
2021–2022	→ Farense (loan)	24	(2)
2022–2024	Konyaspor	34	(1)
2025	Zimbru Chișinău	29	(3)
2026	Oțelul Galați	16	(0)
2026–	Olympiakos Nicosia	0	(0)

International career^{‡}
2013	Portugal U15	1	(0)
2013–2014	Portugal U16	14	(0)
2014–2015	Portugal U17	17	(1)
2015–2016	Portugal U18	8	(0)
2015–2017	Portugal U19	9	(0)
2017–2018	Portugal U20	6	(0)
2023–	Angola	10	(0)
Medal record
Men's football
Representing Portugal
UEFA European Under-19 Championship
Runner-up	2017 Georgia
- * Club domestic league appearances and goals as of 16 July 2026 ‡ National team caps and goals as of 2 February 2024

Bruno Lourenço Pinto de Almeida Paz (born 23 April 1998) is a professional footballer who plays as a defensive midfielder for Cypriot First Division club Olympiakos Nicosia. Born in Portugal, he plays for the Angola national team.

== Football career ==
On 6 August 2016, Paz made his professional debut with Sporting B in a 2016–17 LigaPro match against Portimonense.

Paz made his senior debut for Sporting CP in December 2018, when he was a 73rd-minute substitute in a 3-0 Europa League win over Vorskla Poltava.

On 23 May 2022, Paz signed a two-year contract (with one-year extension option) with Konyaspor in Turkey. In January 2025 he joined Zimbru Chișinău, after being a free agent since May.

On 10 January 2026, the player moved to Oțelul Galați from Liga I, signing a two-and-a-half-year contract.

== International career ==
Paz was born in Portugal to Angolan parents. He's a youth international for Portugal, having played up to the Portugal U20s. He was called up to the Angola national team for 2023 Africa Cup of Nations qualification matches in March 2023.

== Career statistics ==
=== International ===
As of matches played 2 February 2024.

National team	Year	Apps	Goals
Angola	2023	5	0
Angola	2024	5	0
Total		10	0

== Honours ==
Portugal U19

- UEFA European Under-19 Championship runner-up: 2017
