= Oğulcan Ülgün =

Turkish footballer

Personal information
- Date of birth: 11 May 1998 (age 28)
- Place of birth: Istanbul, Turkey
- Height: 1.78 m (5 ft 10 in)
- Position: Defensive midfielder

Team information
- Current team: Gençlerbirliği
- Number: 35

Youth career
- 2007–2009: Ceylanspor
- 2009–16: Altınordu

Senior career*
Years	Team	Apps	(Gls)
2016–2021	Altınordu	102	(2)
2021–2025	Konyaspor	102	(6)
2025–	Gençlerbirliği	26	(5)

International career^{‡}
2018–2020	Turkey U21	4	(0)
- * Club domestic league appearances and goals as of 15 August 2026 ‡ National team caps and goals as of 13 October 2020

Oğulcan Ülgün (born 11 May 1998) is a Turkish professional footballer who plays as a defensive midfielder for the Turkish Süper Lig club Gençlerbirliği.

== Professional career ==
A youth product of Altınordu since 2009, Ülgün began his senior career with the club and made over 100 appearances for them in his first 5 seasons with them. He transferred to Konyaspor on 25 June 2021, signing a 3 year contract. He made his professional debut with Konyaspor in a 2–1 Süper Lig win over İstanbul Başakşehir on 22 August 2021.
