= Endri Çekiçi =

Albanian footballer (born 1996)

Personal information
- Full name: Endri Çekiçi
- Date of birth: 23 November 1996 (age 29)
- Place of birth: Pogradec, Albania
- Height: 1.78 m (5 ft 10 in)
- Positions: Central midfielder; attacking midfielder

Team information
- Current team: Qabala
- Number: 8

Youth career
- 2008–2013: Pogradeci
- 2014: Dinamo Zagreb

Senior career*
Years	Team	Apps	(Gls)
2013	Pogradeci	6	(1)
2013–2014	Teuta	0	(0)
2014–2019	Dinamo Zagreb	6	(0)
2015–2019	Dinamo Zagreb II	43	(8)
2016–2017	→ Lokomotiva Zagreb (loan)	35	(6)
2019–2020	Olimpija Ljubljana	43	(17)
2020–2021	Ankaragücü	31	(2)
2021–2023	Konyaspor	55	(8)
2023–2024	Pendikspor	24	(1)
2025	Adanaspor	10	(2)
2025	CR Belouizdad	8	(1)
2026	Zakho	13	(1)
2026–	Qabala	4	(0)

International career^{‡}
2011–2012	Albania U17 (Note: Official competitive UEFA matches only.)	9	(0)
2013–2014	Albania U19	6	(0)
2015–2018	Albania U21	14	(1)
2020–	Albania	11	(1)
- * Club domestic league appearances and goals as of 13 November 2026 ‡ National team caps and goals as of 13 June 2022

Endri Çekiçi (born 23 November 1996) is an Albanian professional footballer who plays as a midfielder for Qabala and Albania national team.

== Club career ==
=== Early career ===
Çekiçi started his career with his local club Pogradeci in 2008, where he made his professional debut on 16 February 2013 at the age of 16. He came on as a 56th-minute substitute for the goalscorer Vangjel Zguro in a home Kategoria e Parë fixture against Besëlidhja which ended in a 1–0 win for Pogradeci. He was in the starting formation for his next game a month later on 16 March in a 3–0 home win against Naftëtari, where he was subbed off for Kristi Laçka in the 58th minute. He scored his first professional goal on 4 May 2013 against Burreli, scoring in the 11th minute to put his side 2–0 up, but it wasn't enough as Burreli came from behind to win the match 3–2. In total he made six league appearances for the club during the 2012–13 season, scoring one goal in the process to help his side finish fifth in the league.

He joined Kategoria Superiore side Teuta in the summer of 2013 ahead of the club's Europa League qualifier against Moldovan side Dacia Chișinău. Çekiçi came on as an 81st-minute substitute in the home leg of the fixture which ended in a 3–1 win for Teuta.

=== Dinamo Zagreb ===
In February 2014, Dinamo Zagreb and Teuta reached an agreement for the transfer of Çekiçi for €60,000. He was assigned in the youth team after successfully passing a trial early on. He signed his first professional contract on 23 November 2014, his birthday; the contract would keep him at Maksimir Stadium until June 2019. Çekiçi stated that this was the best birthday present for him.

Çekiçi made his competitive Dinamo Zagreb debut on 11 February by entering in the last minutes of a 1–0 away win over Istra, in the first leg of 2014–15 Croatian Cup quarter-finals. He made his first league appearance later that month during the 1–1 draw at Osijek in the matchday 22. Çekiçi played his first match as a starter on 28 February in the home match against RNK Split, notably winning a penalty kick in the 16th minute which resulted in him getting injured and substituted. Following the examinations, it was reported that Çekiçi had injured achilles tendon that kept him sidelined for the next three months.

He returned on action on 2 May 2015 by playing the second half of the 5–1 away win over the same opponent which was enough for Dinamo Zagreb to clinch the 2014–15 Croatian First Football League title for the 10th consecutive time. He finished his first season in Croatia by making 4 league appearances, collecting 109 minutes, and one cup appearance.

During the 2015–16 season, on 22 September 2015, Çekiçi scored his maiden Dinamo Zagreb goals in the 7–1 victory over Oštrc Zlatar valid for the 2015–16 Croatian Football Cup. In the first part of the season, his time was even more limited, playing only 15 minutes.

==== Loan to Lokomotiva Zagreb ====
In January 2016, Çekiçi joined Lokomotiva Zagreb on a one-and-a-half year loan. He made his first appearance for his new club on 12 February by appearing as a substitute in the 2–0 away loss to Rijeka. He scored his first league goal on 13 March in the 3–2 away defeat against his parent club Dinamo Zagreb; he also gave an assist for the temporary 2–2 equaliser which earned him Fans' Player of the Week Award. He finished the second part of the 2015–16 season with three goals in eleven appearances.

=== Olimpija Ljubljana ===
In February 2019, Çekiçi signed a contract with Slovenian club Olimpija Ljubljana.

=== MKE Ankaragücü ===
On 5 October 2020, Çekiçi joined Turkish Süper Lig club Ankaragücü.

=== Pendikspor ===
In August 2023, he signed with Süper Lig club Pendikspor.

=== Adanaspor ===
On 14 January 2025, Çekiçi joined Turkish Süper Lig club Adanaspor.

=== CR Belouizdad ===
On 9 August 2025, he joined Algerian club CR Belouizdad.

=== Zakho SC ===
On 10 January 2026, Çekiçi signed for Iraqi club Zakho.

=== Qabala ===
On 3 October 2026, Azerbaijan Premier League club Qabala announced the signing of Çekiçi on a contract until the end of the season.

== International career ==
=== Albania under-17 ===
Çekiçi received his first Albania under-17 call-up by manager Džemal Mustedanagić for a friendly tournament developed in August 2012 in Romania.

He was called up in October 2011 to be part of the team in the qualifying rounds of the 2012 UEFA European Under-17 Championship. He debuted on 13 October by starting in the first match against Slovakia which finished 2–1 for Çekiçi's side. Çekiçi then played in the next two matches against Germany and Estonia as Albania clinched a spot for the elite round.

In the elite round, Çekiçi retained his spot in the starting lineup as Albania suffered defeats to Serbia and the Netherlands, and won in the third match against the Republic of Ireland, eventually getting eliminated with a third-place finish.

Çekiçi continued to be part of under-17 even in the qualifying rounds of the 2013 UEFA European Under-17 Championship. He appeared in all three matches as Albania finished in third position which confirmed elimination.

=== Albania under-19 ===
Çekiçi was first approached to under-19 side by manager Foto Strakosha for the 2014 UEFA European Under-19 Championship qualifying round. He played his first match as a starter on 12 November 2013 versus Greece as Albania slumped into a 1–0 defeat. He also played in the remaining two matches as Albania finished Group 6 in the last position with two points.

Çekiçi then was part of the squad for the following European qualifying campaign, as he was called up by Altin Lala for the 2015 edition. He captained Albania in all three Group 7 matches as Albania once again finished last, losing to Denmark, Portugal and Wales.

=== Albania under-21 ===
He was called up for the first time to the Albania under-21 squad by coach Skënder Gega for the friendly match against Romania U21 on 8 October 2014. In that match, he came on as a substitute in the second half as Albania lost 3–1.

Çekiçi received another call up by the newly appointed coach Redi Jupi for the 2017 UEFA European Under-21 Championship qualifying matches against Israel and Portugal in September 2015. He debuted against the former by coming on as a second-half substitute, netting a penalty kick in the 84th minute to rescue his side a 1–1 home draw. He then played as a starter in the remaining matches, collecting 608 minutes as Albania finished Group 4 in fourth place.

Çekiçi went on to be a member of the under-21 squad in the following qualification tournament under new coach Alban Bushi; he was called up for the friendly match against France U21 on 5 June 2017 and the 2019 UEFA European Under-21 Championship qualification opening match against Estonia U21 on 12 June 2017. In the opening match of the qualifiers against Estonia U21, Çekiçi started from the bench due to a small injury and was put in play in the 86th minute in place of Kristal Abazaj where the match finished in a goalless draw. He missed out the second match against Northern Ireland U21 on 31 August 2017 as he didn't travelled with the team to Northern Ireland due to visa issues.

=== Senior team ===
In September 2020, Çekiçi was included in the Albania senior team squad for the 2020–21 UEFA Nations League C matches against Belarus and Lithuania, but did not make any appearances. He eventually debuted on 14 October 2020 in the second match against Lithuania, replacing Qazim Laçi during the second half in a goalless draw.

== Career statistics ==
=== Club ===
As of 2 December 2017

Appearances and goals by club, season and competition
Club	Season	League			Cup		Europe (Note: Including continental competitions, such as UEFA Champions League and UEFA Europa League)		Other		Total	
Club	Season	Division	Apps	Goals	Apps	Goals	Apps	Goals	Apps	Goals	Apps	Goals
Pogradeci	2012–13	Kategoria e Parë	6	1	—		—		—		6	1
Teuta	2013–14	Kategoria Superiore	—		—		1	0	—		1	0
Dinamo Zagreb	2014–15	Croatian First League	4	0	1	0	—		—		5	0
Dinamo Zagreb	2015–16	Croatian First League	1	0	2	2	1	0	—		4	2
Dinamo Zagreb	2017–18	Croatian First League	—		1	0	—		—		1	0
Dinamo Zagreb	Total		5	0	4	2	1	0	—		10	2
Dinamo Zagreb II	2015–16	Croatian Second League	11	3	—		—		—		11	3
Dinamo Zagreb II	2017–18	Croatian Second League	14	3	—		—		—		14	3
Dinamo Zagreb II	Total		25	6	—		—		—		25	6
Lokomotiva Zagreb	2015–16	Croatian First League	12	3	—		—		—		12	3
Lokomotiva Zagreb	2016–17	Croatian First League	23	3	2	0	8	0	—		33	3
Lokomotiva Zagreb	Total		35	6	2	0	8	0	—		45	6
Career total			71	12	6	2	10	0	—		87	14

== Honours ==
=== Club ===
Dinamo Zagreb

- Croatian First League: 2014–15
- Croatian Cup: 2014–15

Olimpija Ljubljana

- Slovenian Cup: 2018–19
