= Mehmet Ali Büyüksayar =

Turkish footballer

Personal information
- Date of birth: 8 May 2004 (age 22)
- Place of birth: Meram, Turkey
- Height: 1.66 m (5 ft 5 in)
- Position: Winger

Team information
- Current team: Kırklarelispor (on loan from Konyaspor)
- Number: 42

Youth career
- 2016–2021: Konyaspor

Senior career*
Years	Team	Apps	(Gls)
2021–	Konyaspor	9	(0)
2021–2022	→ 1922 Konyaspor (loan)	31	(2)
2024–2025	→ Ümraniyespor (loan)	12	(1)
2025	→ Serik Belediyespor (loan)	6	(0)
2025	→ Sarıyer (loan)	2	(0)
2025–	→ Kırklarelispor (loan)	8	(1)

International career^{‡}
2022	Turkey U18	7	(0)
2022–2023	Turkey U19	8	(0)
- * Club domestic league appearances and goals as of 9 November 2025 ‡ National team caps and goals as of 28 March 2023

Mehmet Ali Büyüksayar (born 8 May 2004) is a Turkish football player who plays as a winger for TFF 2. Lig club Kırklarelispor on loan from Süper Lig club Konyaspor.

== Professional career ==
A youth product of Konyaspor, Büyüksayar signed his first professional contract with the club on 26 February 2021 until 2023, and was shortly after loaned to 1922 Konyaspor for a season and half in the TFF Second League. He returned to Konyaspor for the 2022–23 season, and made his professional debut with them in a 3-2 Turkish Cup win over Bodrumspor on 22 December 2022. On 24 February 2023 he extended his contract with Konyaspor until 2026 and was promoted to their senior team.

== International career ==
Büyüksayar is a youth international for Turkey. He represented the Turkey U18s at the 2022 Mediterranean Games.
