= Kahraman Demirtaş =

Turkish footballer

Personal information
- Date of birth: 1 May 1994 (age 32)
- Place of birth: Mardin, Turkey
- Height: 1.84 m (6 ft 1/2 in)
- Position: Defender

Team information
- Current team: Amedspor
- Number: 47

Senior career*
Years	Team	Apps	(Gls)
2012–2015	Verviers	32	(3)
2015–2018	Roda JC Kerkrade	0	(0)
2018	FC Den Bosch	9	(0)
2018–2021	Altınordu	36	(1)
2018–2019	→ Niğde Anadolu (loan)	14	(0)
2021–2022	Göztepe	23	(0)
2022–2024	Konyaspor	15	(0)
2024–2025	Sakaryaspor	29	(1)
2025–	Amedspor	13	(0)
- * Club domestic league appearances and goals as of 5 May 2026

Kahraman Demirtaş (born 1 May 1994) is a Turkish professional footballer who plays as a defender for TFF 1. Lig club Amedspor.

== Career ==
Born in Turkey, Demirtaş played for Verviers, Roda JC Kerkrade, FC Den Bosch, Altınordu, Niğde Anadolu, Göztepe and Konyaspor.
