= Ahmet Karademir =

Turkish footballer

Personal information
- Date of birth: 2 April 2004 (age 22)
- Place of birth: Selçuklu, Turkey
- Height: 1.73 m (5 ft 8 in)
- Position: Winger

Team information
- Current team: Şanlıurfaspor (on loan from Pendikspor
- Number: 17

Youth career
- 2014: Karakartallarspor
- 2014–2015: 1922 Konyaspor
- 2015–2020: Konyaspor

Senior career*
Years	Team	Apps	(Gls)
2020–2025	Konyaspor	3	(0)
2023–2024	→ Karaman FK (loan)	42	(2)
2024	→ Isparta 32 (loan)	6	(0)
2025	→ 1922 Konyaspor (loan)	14	(1)
2025–	Pendikspor	24	(1)
2026–	→ Şanlıurfaspor (loan)	2	(0)

International career^{‡}
2018	Turkey U14	2	(0)
2018–2019	Turkey U15	3	(0)
2019–2020	Turkey U16	17	(3)
2021–2022	Turkey U18	12	(0)
- * Club domestic league appearances and goals as of 3 November 2024 ‡ National team caps and goals as of 4 July 2022

Ahmet Karademir (born 2 April 2004) is a Turkish football player who plays as a winger for TFF Second League club Şanlıurfaspor, on loan from Pendikspor.

== Professional career ==
A youth product of Karakartallarspor, 1922 Konyaspor and Konyaspor, Karademir signed his first professional contract with Konyaspor on 11 September 2020. At the age of 16, Karademir made his professional debut with Konyaspor in a 2–0 Süper Lig win over BB Erzurumspor on 5 December 2020.

== International career ==
Karademir is a youth international for Turkey, having represented the Turkey U14s, U15s, and U16s.
