= Konya Metropolitan Municipality Stadium =

Multi-purpose stadium in Konya, Turkey

Coordinates: 37.946°N 32.488°E

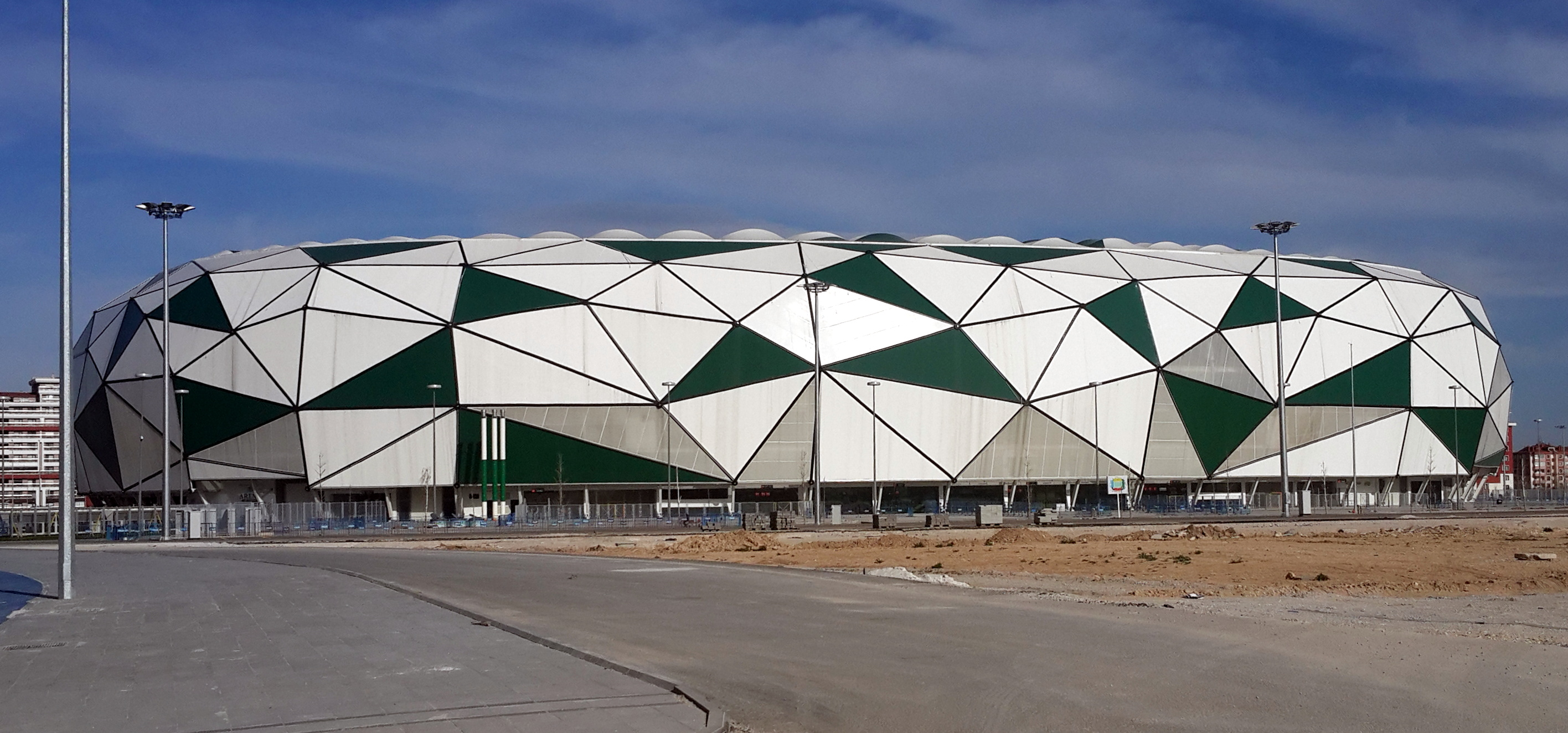

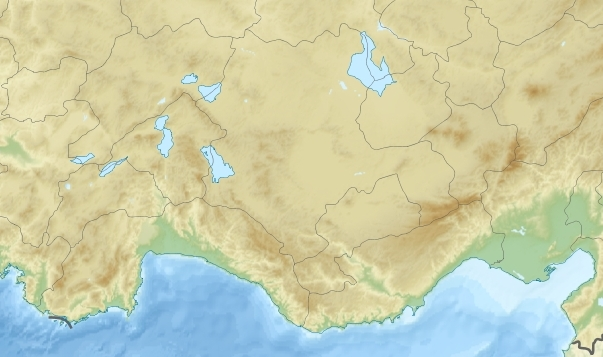
- Location in Southwestern Turkey Location in Turkey
- Full name: Konya Büyükşehir Belediye Stadyumu
- Location: Selçuklu, Konya, Turkey
- Owner: Konya City Council
- Capacity: 41,600
- Executive suites: 55
- Surface: Grass
- Record attendance: 41,007 (Turkey–Netherlands, 6 September 2015)

Construction
- Groundbreaking: 17 October 2012
- Built: 2012–2014
- Opened: 13 September 2014
- Architect: Bahadır Kul
- General contractor: Sarıdağlar İnșaat

Tenants
- Konyaspor (2014–present); Turkey national football team (selected matches)

The Konya Metropolitan Municipality Stadium (Turkish: Konya Büyükşehir Belediye Stadyumu) is a multi-purpose stadium in Konya, Turkey. It is primarily used for football matches with Konyaspor being the main tenants. It is part of a complex of sports venues that are planned on the outskirts of the city, as part of the Konya Olympic Village. It replaced the aging Konya Atatürk Stadium, which has been in use since the early 1950s. The stadium has a capacity of 41,600 (all-seated) and is totally covered.

The stadium is located in Selçuklu, the main district of Konya.

== Details ==
The stadium meets all requirements of UEFA and will be a part of an ensemble with a brand new multi-sport hall, an athletic stadium, a velodrome and different multi sports areas. The stadium and the Sports Park are located on a 40 hectare spot 8 km in the north of the city center, projected by the authorities as a sports and recreation area and surrounded by a new residential area that is still under construction.

The design of the Konya Büyükşehir Belediye Stadyumu is a tribute to the Konya region, its history, its traditions and its locals. It portrays an allegory of the dance of the whirling dervishes and also Konya’s reputation as a “Cycling City”. While the undulation of the round shaped tribunes are transforming the dance of the dervishes into a new dimension, the roof is designed as a “Spoke Wheel”. Especially during evening events the combination of these elements create an inimitable sign symbolizing the city of Konya.

The semi transparent screen façade renders the characteristic conic shape and allows laser shows and the projection of images from outside and the inside as well.

The stadium is designed as a one-tier-stadium with a formidable east and west stand – both have more than 60 rows. Furthermore, the multifunctional prepared stadium will have fitness and physiotherapy centre available and shops as well. The VIP club will be used also as a public restaurant and a rentable event location. Also the design of the north and south stands allow the extension with exclusive lounge satellites and sky gardens.

As part of the accommodation concept in Konya, the Sports Park will contain several apartment buildings that will be used as dormitories and residential houses as well. Beyond that, the ecological sustainability of the stadium building will be achieved by innovative integrated measures that will effect in symbiosis long lasting benefits for the stadium operator. This measures include an integrated sun protection by a screen façade helping to minimise the need of air conditioning, a grey water use for toilets and natural green (dual water supply + rainwater) to reduce potable water use by 50%+ and the use of recyclable and low energy building materials. Furthermore, a permanent use of local high efficient cogeneration energy supply for the stadium and the residential area around is scheduled to increase the efficiency of energy production from 60% to 95% - only emergency power supply will be guaranteed by general power grid. Last but not least roof mounted solar panels will save ecological resources and reduce energy costs.

== Naming rights ==
On 17 September 2020, the stadium signed the three-year deal with the local energy dustributer Meram Elektrik Dağıtım A.Ş. (MEDAŞ) as the title sponsor. In result it was commercially known as Medaş Konya Büyükşehir Stadyumu.

== Turkey national football team matches ==
The following national team matches were held in the stadium.

#	Date	Score	Opponent	Competition
1	3 September 2015	1–1	Latvia	UEFA Euro 2016 qualifying
2	6 September 2015	3–0	Netherlands	UEFA Euro 2016 qualifying
3	13 October 2015	1–0	Iceland	UEFA Euro 2016 qualifying
4	6 October 2016	2–2	Ukraine	2018 FIFA World Cup qualification
5	17 November 2018	0–1	Sweden	2018–19 UEFA Nations League
6	8 June 2019	2–0	France	UEFA Euro 2020 qualifying
7	29 March 2022	2–3	Italy	Friendly
8	15 October 2023	4–0	Latvia	UEFA Euro 2024 qualifying
9	7 September 2025	0–6	Spain	2026 FIFA World Cup qualification

== See also ==
- List of football stadiums in Turkey
- Lists of stadiums
