= Muhammet Demir =

Turkish footballer (born 1992)

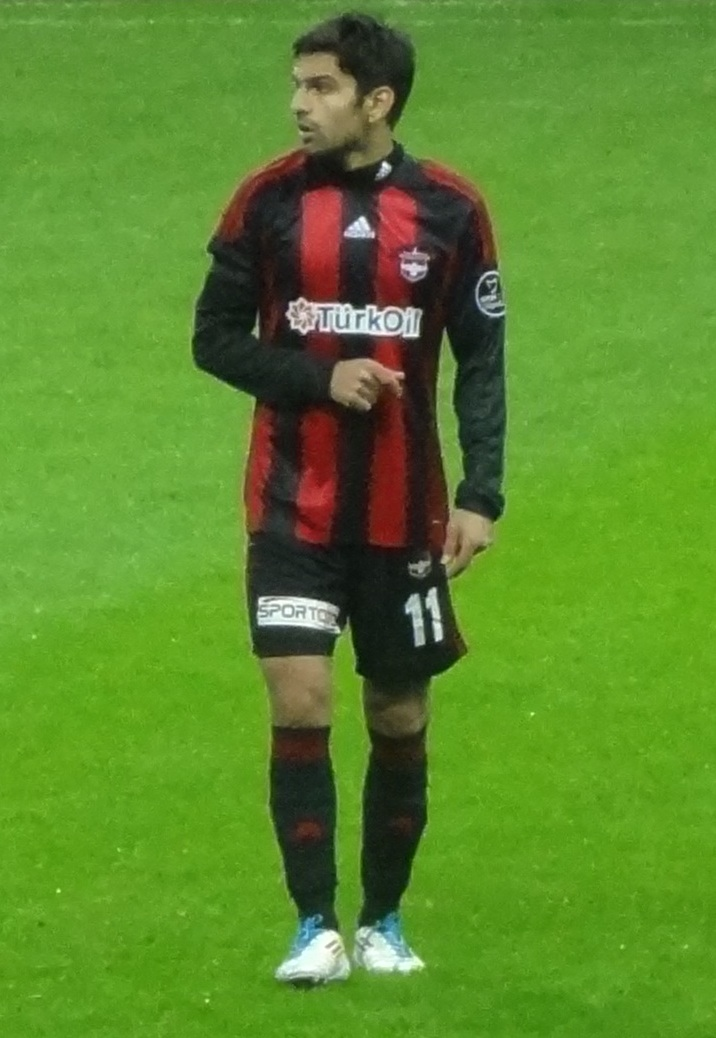
- Demir with Gaziantepspor in 2011

Personal information
- Date of birth: 10 January 1992 (age 34)
- Place of birth: Araklı, Turkey
- Height: 1.80 m (5 ft 11 in)
- Position: Forward

Youth career
- 2002–2004: Ereğli Belediyespor
- 2004–2009: Bursaspor

Senior career*
Years	Team	Apps	(Gls)
2009–2011	Bursaspor	2	(0)
2011–2016	Gaziantepspor	101	(31)
2016–2017	Trabzonspor	12	(4)
2017	→ Gaziantepspor (loan)	7	(1)
2017–2019	Sivasspor	38	(5)
2019–2021	İstanbul Başakşehir	3	(0)
2019–2021	→ Gaziantep (loan)	53	(18)
2021–2022	Gaziantep	29	(6)
2022–2024	Konyaspor	26	(6)
2024–2026	Bursaspor	32	(19)

International career^{‡}
2007	Turkey U15	3	(3)
2007–2008	Turkey U16	6	(5)
2008	Turkey U17	21	(19)
2009	Turkey U18	4	(4)
2010–2011	Turkey U19	12	(15)
2011–2014	Turkey U21	5	(2)
2014–	Turkey	2	(0)
- * Club domestic league appearances and goals as of 25 April 2026 ‡ National team caps and goals as of 2 December 2015

Muhammet Demir (born 10 January 1992) is a Turkish professional footballer who plays as a striker.

== Early life ==
Demir was born in Araklı, Trabzon. His family moved to Karadeniz Ereğli, Zonguldak when Demir was five years old. He has four brothers: two older and two younger twins (cancel crew). His younger brothers play for the Bursaspor youth team.

Demir played for his school team before Karadeniz Ereğli Belediyespor signed him to a youth contract in 2002. When asked what his goals were as a footballer, Demir replied "I didn't have any goals when I started playing football. It was just a game for me, but then I was signed to Karadeniz Ereğli Belediyespor. It was then I started thinking of what I wanted to accomplish... I wanted a better life for my family." Demir's favorite footballer is Fatih Tekke, a fellow striker from Trabzon.

Sedat Özden, a former professional football player who played for Bursaspor, spotted Demir at a youth tournament in Ankara. He became interested in bringing Demir to Bursa after he helped lead Karadeniz Ereğli Belediyespor to the championship. Bayram Altıntaş, Demir's coach at Karadeniz Ereğli Belediyespor, offered Demir to Bursaspor. The club signed Demir to a youth contract at age twelve.

Due to his small stature and differences between his small hometown and the more modern, bustling city of Bursa, Demir quickly became homesick. After spending one month with Bursaspor, he packed his bags and returned home. Although he was highly coveted by the coaches in Bursa, Demir was reluctant to return. It was then that his father told him "go there (Bursa) and finish school. If you don't want to become a footballer, then at least finish school and come home."

Demir described his first season as a bad one. He said his teammates couldn't believe he was given a chance to play due to his bad form. However, his coach Yılmaz Burul believed in Demir's abilities and pushed him forward. Demir was named captain the following season. He has scored seventeen goals in 27 A2 matches.

== Club career ==
Demir joined Bursaspor in 2005 and signed a professional contract in 2007. He made his first appearance in the Süper Lig in the final game of the 2008–09 season, coming off the bench in the 86th minute against Gaziantepspor. Demir regularly trains with the senior squad, but has not been able to play many games due to injuries.

Chelsea and West Ham United courted Demir and made offers after he scored two goals against Russia in a youth national team match. Bursaspor turned both offers down, stating that it was too soon for Demir to leave the club. He has stated that he does not want to play for an Istanbul club such as Fenerbahçe or Galatasaray, but move abroad instead.

After refusing to sign a new deal with his current club Bursaspor, he was sent to Gaziantepspor in January 2011. In the last day of the transfer period he accepted to sign a contract with Gaziantepspor for four and a half years.

On 2 July 2019, Demir joined İstanbul Başakşehir on a four-year deal.

On 3 September 2019, he has signed a season long loan deal with Gazişehir Gaziantep.

On 4 July 2022, Demir signed a two-year contract with Konyaspor.

== International career ==
Demir led the Turkey U-17 squad to the quarter finals of the 2009 U-17 World Cup in Nigeria, where the team lost 5–3 on penalties to Colombia. He scored three goals and notched one assist during his five games at the tournament, good enough for joint third place for top scorer.

On 10 October 2014, Demir played his first national match for Turkey against the Czech Republic in Istanbul, replacing Olcay Şahan after 66 minutes of a 2–1 defeat.

== Honours ==
Bursaspor

- Süper Lig: 2009–10

Gaziantepspor

- Spor Toto Cup: 2011–12
