= Adil Demirbağ =

Turkish footballer

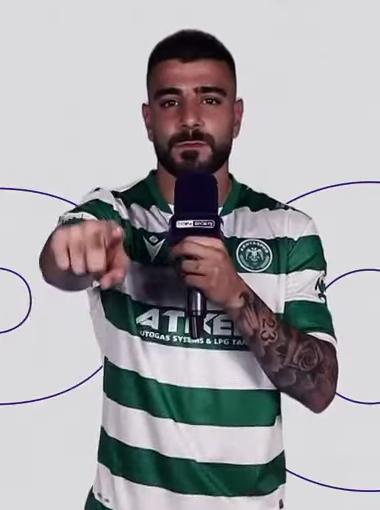
- Demirbağ in 2021

Personal information
- Full name: Adil Demirbağ
- Date of birth: 10 December 1997 (age 28)
- Place of birth: Elazığ, Turkey
- Height: 1.82 m (6 ft 0 in)
- Position: Centre back

Team information
- Current team: Konyaspor
- Number: 4

Youth career
- 2008–2011: Elazığ DSİ
- 2011–2012: Beşiktaş
- 2012–2014: Sarıyer
- 2017–2018: Bucaspor

Senior career*
Years	Team	Apps	(Gls)
2015–2017	Bucaspor	40	(1)
2017–2020	Adana Demirspor	62	(3)
2018	→ Fatih Karagümrük (loan)	11	(1)
2020–	Konyaspor	160	(4)

International career^{‡}
2016	Turkey U19	1	(0)
2018	Turkey U20	4	(0)
2018	Turkey U21	4	(1)
- * Club domestic league appearances and goals as of 10 June 2026 ‡ National team caps and goals as of 06:39, 6 June 2022 (UTC)

Adil Demirbağ (born 10 December 1997) is a Turkish professional footballer who plays as a centre back for Turkish Süper Lig club Konyaspor.

== Professional career ==
Demirbağ began his career in the lower leagues of Turkey, before joining Konyaspor on 11 September 2020. Demirbağ made his professional debut with Konyaspor in a 0-0 Süper Lig tie with Gençlerbirliği S.K. on 19 September 2020.

On 13 November 2025, was banned from playing for 45 days for his involvement in the 2025 Turkish football betting scandal.
