= 1922 Konyaspor =

Association football club

- Full name: 1922 Konyaspor Kulübü
- Founded: 1955
- Ground: Selçuk Üniversitesi 15 Temmuz Stadium, Konya
- Capacity: 1,500
- Chairman: Muhammet Mustafa Kariman
- Manager: Çağdaş Çankaya
- League: TFF Third League
- 2023–24: 11th, Group III
- Website: http://www.1922konyaspor.org
Home colours	Away colours

1922 Konyaspor is a Turkish professional football club based in Konya. It was founded in 1955 and its colors are green and white. The club competes in the TFF Third League.

Founded in 1955 as Konya Şekerspor, the club was known as Anadolu Selçukluspor (2012–2014) and Anadolu Selçukspor (2014–2019), before being renamed to 1922 Konyaspor in 2019.

== See also ==
- Torku Şekerspor, the cycling team of the club
