= 2022–23 Giresunspor season =

Giresunspor
2022–23 season
- Chairman: Hakan Karaahmet (until 25 February 2023); Nahid Ramazan Yamak (from 25 February 2023)
- Manager: Hakan Keleş (until 2 May 2023); İrfan Buz (from 4 May 2023)
- Stadium: Çotanak Sports Complex
- Süper Lig: 16th (relegated)
- Turkish Cup: Fifth round
- Top goalscorer: League: Riad Bajić (14 goals); All: Riad Bajić (14 goals)
- Biggest defeat: Giresunspor 0–5 Karacabey Belediye Spor
Home colours	Away colours	Third colours

The 2022–23 season was the 55th season in the existence of Giresunspor and the club's second consecutive season in the top flight of Turkish football. In addition to the domestic league, Giresunspor participated in this season's edition of the Turkish Cup. The season covers the period from 1 July 2022 to 30 June 2023.

== Players ==
=== First-team squad ===
As of 8 August 2022

Note: Flags indicate national team as defined under FIFA eligibility rules; some limited exceptions apply. Players may hold more than one non-FIFA nationality.

No.	Pos.	Nation	Player
1	GK	(Turkey) TUR	Onurcan Piri
2	DF	(Turkey) TUR	Talha Ülvan
4	DF	(Turkey) TUR	Sergen Piçinciol
5	MF	(Senegal) SEN	Faustin Senghor
6	DF	(Turkey) TUR	Alper Uludağ
7	FW	(Spain) ESP	Borja Sainz
8	MF	(Mali) MLI	Hamidou Traoré
9	FW	(Bosnia and Herzegovina) BIH	Riad Bajić
10	FW	(Brazil) BRA	Sergio
14	MF	(Colombia) COL	Robert Mejía
15	MF	(Turkey) TUR	Anıl Yiğit Çınar
17	MF	(Turkey) TUR	Doğan Can Davas
19	MF	(Turkey) TUR	Rahmetullah Berişbek

No.	Pos.	Nation	Player
21	DF	(Uruguay) URU	Ramón Arias
22	MF	(Turkey) TUR	Murat Akpınar
25	DF	(Colombia) COL	Alexis Pérez
26	MF	(Montenegro) MNE	Vukan Savićević
28	MF	(Turkey) TUR	Erol Can Akdağ
33	DF	(Turkey) TUR	Fatih Yılmaz
35	GK	(Turkey) TUR	Ferhat Kaplan
50	DF	(Turkey) TUR	Kadir Seven
67	MF	(Turkey) TUR	Furkan Kütük
74	GK	(Turkey) TUR	Erkan Anapa
75	FW	(Turkey) TUR	Mert Kurt
77	DF	(Turkey) TUR	Hayrullah Bilazer

=== Out on loan ===
Note: Flags indicate national team as defined under FIFA eligibility rules; some limited exceptions apply. Players may hold more than one non-FIFA nationality.

No.	Pos.	Nation	Player
—	GK	(Turkey) TUR	Erkan Anapa (at Payasspor)
—	MF	(Turkey) TUR	Atakan Doganay Aygün (at Erbaaspor)

No.	Pos.	Nation	Player
—	MF	(Albania) ALB	Esat Mala (at Partizani Tirana)

== Pre-season and friendlies ==
Win Draw Loss Fixtures

24 September 2022 Friendly	Kayserispor (Turkey)	0–0	(Turkey) Giresunspor	Kayseri
17:00 TRT (UTC+3)				Stadium: Erciyes Yüksek İrtifa Kamp Merkezi

6 December 2022 Friendly	Giresunspor (Turkey)	1–1	(South Africa) TS Galaxy	Antalya
15:00 TRT (UTC+3)	Ülvan 42'			Stadium: Titanic Hotel Spor Kompleks Field 1

9 December 2022 Friendly	Kayserispor (Turkey)	5–3	(Turkey) Giresunspor	Kadriye
15:00 TRT (UTC+3)	Gavranović 10'; Thiam 29'; Mané 68'; Sarıarslan 73' (pen.); Pektemek 88'		Bajić 31'; Serginho 40'; Savićević 82'	Stadium: Hüseyin Aygün Football Center

15 December 2022 Friendly	Beşiktaş (Turkey)	5–3	(Turkey) Giresunspor	Belek
14:00 TRT (UTC+3)	Fernandes 30', 46'; Nkoudou 45'; Tosun 69', 86'		Pérez (yellow card) 22'; Serginho 51'; Can Davas 81'; Savićević 90'	Stadium: Gloria Sports Arena

== Competitions ==
=== Overall record ===
Competition	First match	Last match	Starting round	Final position	Record							
Competition	First match	Last match	Starting round	Final position	Pld	W	D	L	GF	GA	GD	Win %
Süper Lig	7 August 2022	7 June 2023	Matchday 1	16th	36	10	10	16	42	60	−18	27.78
Turkish Cup	20 October 2022	21 December 2022	Third round	Fifth round	3	2	0	1	6	8	−2	66.67
Total					39	12	10	17	48	68	−20	30.77

Source: Soccerway

=== Süper Lig ===
==== League table ====
Pos	Team	Pld	W	D	L	GF	GA	GD	Pts	Qualification or relegation
14	Sivasspor	36	11	8	17	46	54	−8	41 (Note: Head-to-head points: İstanbulspor 11, Antalyaspor 10, Sivasspor 8, Alanyaspor 4.)	
15	Alanyaspor	36	11	8	17	54	70	−16	41	
16	Giresunspor (R)	36	10	10	16	42	60	−18	40	Relegation to TFF First League
17	Ümraniyespor (R)	36	7	9	20	47	64	−17	30	Relegation to TFF First League
18	Gaziantep (Note: On 12 February 2023, Gaziantep and Hatayspor withdrew from the league following the 2023 Turkey–Syria earthquake and were not relegated at the end of the season.)	36	6	7	23	31	72	−41	25	Withdrawn

Source: Süper Lig
Rules for classification: 1) Points; 2) Head-to-head points; 3) Head-to-head goal difference; 4) Head-to-head goals scored; 5) Goal difference; 6) Goals scored; 7) Play-off.
(R) Relegated

==== Results summary ====
Overall								Home						Away					
Pld	W	D	L	GF	GA	GD	Pts	W	D	L	GF	GA	GD	W	D	L	GF	GA	GD
36	10	10	16	42	60	−18	40	6	4	8	25	29	−4	4	6	8	17	31	−14

Source: Spor Toto Süper Lig

==== Results by round ====
Round	1	2	3	4	5	6	7	8	9	10	11	12	13	14	15	16	17	18	19	20	21	22	23	24	25	26	27	28	29	30	31	32	33	34	35	36	37	38
Ground	H	A	H	A	H	A		A	H	A	H	A	H	A	A	H	A	H	A	A	H	A	H	A	H		H	A	H	A	H	A	H	H	A	H	A	H
Result	L	W	W	L	L	D	B	D	L	L	D	L	W	W	D	W	L	L	D	D	L	L	L	D	D	B	D	L	W	L	L	L	D	W	W	L	W	W
Position	14	8	7	11	11	11	12	12	12	14	16	17	15	12	13	10	11	13	11	12	14	16	17	17	17	17	16⁣	16⁣	15	16	16	16	16	16	16	16	16	16

Source: Spor Toto Süper Lig
A = Away; H = Home; B = Bye; W = Win; D = Draw; L = Loss

==== Matches ====
The league schedule was released on 4 July.

7 August 2022 1	Giresunspor	2–3	Adana Demirspor	Giresun
19:15 TRT (UTC+3)	Sainz 56'; Berişbek 90+1'	Report	Inler 23'; Belhanda 28'; Onyekuru 82'	Stadium: Çotanak Sports Complex; Referee: Volkan Bayarslan

13 August 2022 2	Galatasaray	0–1	Giresunspor	Istanbul
21:45 TRT (UTC+3)	Oliveira (yellow card) 16'; van Aanholt (yellow card) 40'; Aktürkoğlu (yellow card) 74'	Report	Sainz (yellow card) 26' (goal) 76'; Uludağ (yellow card) 74'	Stadium: Nef Stadium; Referee: Kadir Saglam

20 August 2022 3	Giresunspor	1–0	Kasımpaşa	Giresun
19:15 TRT (UTC+3)	Mejía (yellow card) 6'; Bilazer (yellow card) 38'; Pérez (yellow card) 86'; Bajić 90'	Report	Yıldırım (yellow card) 13'; Gemicibaşı (yellow card) 41'	Stadium: Çotanak Sports Complex; Referee: Bahattin Simsek

28 August 2022 4	Kayserispor	3–0	Giresunspor	Kayseri
19:15 TRT (UTC+3)	Bulut 22'; Thiam (penalty missed) 45+5'; Gavranović 72'; Kolovetsios (yellow card) 84'; Civelek 87'	Report	Pérez (yellow card) 45+4'; Uludağ (yellow card) 74'	Stadium: Kadir Has Stadium; Attendance: 7,580; Referee: Sarperbaris Saka

3 September 2022 5	Giresunspor	0–1	Konyaspor	Giresun
21:45 TRT (UTC+3)	Serginho (yellow card) 27'; Savićević (yellow card) 90+3'; Arias (yellow card) 90+7'	Report	Demir 51'	Stadium: Çotanak Sports Complex; Referee: Volkan Bayarslan

10 September 2022 6	Fatih Karagümrük	1–1	Giresunspor	Istanbul
20:00 TRT (UTC+3)	Colley (yellow card) 25'; Dursun (yellow card) 62'; Ozdoyev (yellow card) 74'; Diagne 90+2'	Report	Campuzano (yellow card) 29'; Mejía (yellow card) 33'; Bajić (penalty missed) 75' 75'; Uludağ (yellow card) 90+6'	Stadium: Vefa Stadium; Referee: Erkan Ozdamar

7	Bye

2 October 2022 8	Alanyaspor	1–1	Giresunspor	Antalya
14:30 TRT (UTC+3)	Targhalline (yellow card) 21'; Güneş (yellow card) 29'; Fer (yellow card) 72'; Aksoy (yellow card) 79'; Balkovec 81'	Report	Serginho (red card) 4'; Arias (yellow card) 27'; Sağlam 65' (pen.); Pérez (yellow card) 79'	Stadium: Kırbıyık Holding Stadium; Attendance: 2,775; Referee: Tugay Kaan Numanoğlu

8 October 2022 9	Giresunspor	0–1	Beşiktaş	Giresun
20:00 TRT (UTC+3)	Akpınar (yellow card) 13'; Arias (yellow card) 31'; Campuzano (yellow card) 45+3'; Sainz (yellow card) 55'	Report	Weghorst (penalty missed) 20'; Rosier (yellow card) 28'; Sanuç 34'; Fernandes (yellow card) 72'; Tosun (yellow card) 79'	Stadium: Çotanak Sports Complex; Attendance: 10,402; Referee: Yaşar Kemal Uğurlu

17 October 2022 10	Sivasspor	3–0	Giresunspor	Sivas
20:00 TRT (UTC+3)	Yatabaré 35'; Saba 45'; Arslan 89'	Report	Senghor (yellow card) 71'	Stadium: New Sivas 4 Eylül Stadium; Attendance: 3,572; Referee: Bahattin Şimşek

24 October 2022 11	Giresunspor	1–1	Ankaragücü	Giresun
20:00 TRT (UTC+3)	Akpınar (yellow card) 66'; Uludağ (yellow card) 75'; Bajić 85'; Campuzano (yellow card) 90'	Report	Ceylan (yellow card) 38'; Ciğerci (yellow card) 57'; Jesé 69' (pen.) (yellow card) 71'; Antalyalı (yellow card) 75'; Kılınç (yellow card) 90'; Akkan (yellow card) 90+2'	Stadium: Çotanak Sports Complex; Attendance: 4,382; Referee: Suat Arslanboğa

31 October 2022 12	İstanbul Başakşehir	3–1	Giresunspor	Istanbul
20:00 TRT (UTC+3)	Ndayishimiye 38' (yellow card) 44'; Kény 65'; Şahiner 76'	Report	Piçinciol (yellow card) 50'; Sainz (yellow card) 57'; Serginho 80'	Stadium: Fatih Terim Stadium; Attendance: 2,353; Referee: Mert Güzenge

5 November 2022 13	Giresunspor	3–2	İstanbulspor	Giresun
14:30 TRT (UTC+3)	Uludağ 45+2'; Campuzano 48'; Mejía 56'; Piri (yellow card) 87'	Report	Adi Mehremić (yellow card) 11'; Yılmaz (yellow card) 14'; Ethemi 18'; Yeşil (yellow card) 77'; Topalli 87'; Berber (yellow card) 90+2'	Stadium: Çotanak Sports Complex; Attendance: 3,035; Referee: Sarper Barış Saka

12 November 2022 14	Fenerbahçe	1–2	Giresunspor	Istanbul
17:00 TRT (UTC+3)	João Pedro (yellow card) 13' (yellow-red card) 40'; Valencia 19' (pen.)	Report	Pérez (yellow card) 26'; Arias (yellow card) 46'; Uludağ (yellow card) 63'; Sainz 71', 83'	Stadium: Şükrü Saracoğlu Stadium; Attendance: 41,203; Referee: Arda Kardeşler

24 December 2022 15	Hatayspor	1–1	Giresunspor	Hatay
13:30 TRT (UTC+3)	Öksüz (yellow card) 23'; Yıldırım 75'; Adekugbe (yellow card) 86'	Report	Uludağ (yellow card) 40'; Campuzano (yellow card) 83'; Bajić 87'; Sağlam (yellow card) 89'	Stadium: New Hatay Stadium; Attendance: 3,233; Referee: Mete Kalkavan

29 December 2022 16	Giresunspor	2–1	Gaziantep	Giresun
17:00 TRT (UTC+3)	Arias (yellow card) 23'; Serginho 24'; Sağlam (yellow card) 49'; Sainz (yellow card) 56'; Savićević (yellow card) 80'; Kuwas (yellow card) 90+5'; Bajić 90+5'	Report	Kitsiou (yellow card) 6'; Soyalp (yellow card) 33'; Veliu 52'; Djilobodji (yellow card) 79'	Stadium: Çotanak Sports Complex; Attendance: 2,828; Referee: Zorbay Küçük

5 January 2023 17	Trabzonspor	3–0	Giresunspor	Trabzon
20:00 TRT (UTC+3)	Bajić 30' (o.g.); Siopis (yellow card) 61'; Gómez (yellow card) 62' (goal) 69'; Haspolat 75'	Report	Arias (yellow card) 16'; Akpınar (yellow card) 79'	Stadium: Şenol Güneş Sports Complex; Attendance: 14,947; Referee: Ali Palabıyık

8 January 2023 18	Giresunspor	0–1	Ümraniyespor	Giresun
16:00 TRT (UTC+3)	Pérez (yellow card) 88'; Sağlam (yellow card) 90+6'	Report	Gheorghe (yellow card) 45+1'; Gürbulak (yellow card) 54'; Mršić 83'; Demir (red card) 90+7'	Stadium: Çotanak Sports Complex; Attendance: 3,724; Referee: Sarper Barış Saka

14 January 2023 19	Antalyaspor	2–2	Giresunspor	Antalya
13:30 TRT (UTC+3)	Sinik 4'; Luiz Adriano 59'; Fernando (red card) 61'; Sertel (yellow card) 82'; Akyol (yellow card) 90+11'; Kudryashov (yellow card) 90+13'	Report	Sainz 40'; Bajić 79'; Savićević (yellow card) 90+8'; Uludağ (yellow card) 90+11'; Serginho (yellow card) 90+13'; Pérez (yellow card) 90+13'	Stadium: Antalya Stadium; Attendance: 4,889; Referee: Yaşar Kemal Uğurlu

20 January 2023 20	Adana Demirspor	1–1	Giresunspor	Adana
20:00 TRT (UTC+3)	Svensson (yellow card) 75'; Özbir (yellow card) 76'; Belhanda (yellow card) 77'; Ndiaye 84'; Sarı (yellow card) 90+7' (yellow card) 90+10' (red card); Inler (yellow card) 90+8'	Report	Bajić 13' (pen.); Pérez (red card) 18'; Sainz (yellow card) 45+2'; Sağlam (yellow card) 76'; Bilazer (yellow card) 90+8'; Mejía (yellow card) 90+11'	Stadium: New Adana Stadium; Attendance: 14,271; Referee: Yasin Kol

28 January 2023 21	Giresunspor	0–4	Galatasaray	Giresun
19:00 TRT (UTC+3)	Arias (yellow card) 42'; Bajić (yellow card) 62'; Savićević (yellow card) 63'	Report	Icardi (penalty missed) 45'; Mertens 45+3'; Dubois 60'; Rashica 88'; Akgün 90+5'	Stadium: Çotanak Sports Complex; Attendance: 14,924; Referee: Bahattin Şimşek

1 February 2023 22	Kasımpaşa	5–1	Giresunspor	Istanbul
17:00 TRT (UTC+3)	Fall 14'; Kara (yellow card) 15' (goal) 45+4' (pen.), 66'; Eysseric (yellow card) 17' (goal) 29' (pen.); Ouanes 50'	Report	Savićević 10'; Bilazer (yellow card) 45+3'; Mejía (yellow card) 58'	Stadium: Recep Tayyip Erdoğan Stadium; Referee: Hüseyin Göçek

25 February 2023 23	Giresunspor	1–2	Kayserispor	Giresun
19:00 TRT (UTC+3)	Bilazer (yellow card) 33'; Arias (yellow card) 54'; Serginho (yellow card) 55'; Bajić 58'	Report	Mané 6'; Karimi (yellow card) 28'; Thiam (yellow card) 33' (goal) 40'; Hosseini (yellow card) 58'; Bayazit (yellow card) 59'; Attamah (yellow card) 65'; Uzodimma (yellow card) 84'; Civelek (yellow card) 90+7'	Stadium: Çotanak Sports Complex; Referee: Ali Şansalan

5 March 2023 24	Konyaspor	0–0	Giresunspor	Konya
16:00 TRT (UTC+3)	Bouchalakis (yellow card) 18'; Paz (yellow card) 85'; Oğuz (yellow card) 89'	Report	Kaplan (yellow card) 42'; Sainz (yellow card) 85'; Genç (yellow card) 89'; Uludağ (yellow card) 90+5'	Stadium: Konya Metropolitan Municipality Stadium; Referee: Erkan Özdamar

10 March 2023 25	Giresunspor	2–2	Fatih Karagümrük	Giresun
20:00 TRT (UTC+3)	Bajić 20' (pen.); Sainz 39'; Bilazer (yellow card) 45+2'; Genç (yellow card) 65'	Report	Mercan 45'; Baniya (yellow card) 53'; Borini 57'; Ricci (yellow card) 79'	Stadium: Çotanak Sports Complex; Referee: Kadir Sağlam

26	Bye

2 April 2023 27	Giresunspor	2–2	Alanyaspor	Giresun
16:00 TRT (UTC+3)	Serginho (yellow card) 35'; Campuzano (yellow card) 48'; Davas 82'; Kuwas 88' (pen.)	Report	Karaca 17'; Rúnarsson (yellow card) 56'; Ferhat 73', (yellow card) 90+4'; Pereira (yellow card) 76'; Fer (yellow card) 90+2'	Stadium: Çotanak Sports Complex; Referee: Turgut Doman

9 April 2023 28	Beşiktaş	3–1	Giresunspor	Istanbul
20:30 TRT (UTC+3)	Aboubakar 39' (pen.), 45+5'; Hadžiahmetović (yellow card) 49'; Redmond 54'; Masuaku (yellow card) 57'	Report	Bajić 21'; Pérez (yellow card) 37'; Kuwas (yellow card) 45+2'; Sainz (yellow card) 67'; Berişbek (yellow card) 90'	Stadium: Vodafone Park; Referee: Atilla Karaoğlan

16 April 2023 29	Giresunspor	1–0	Sivasspor	Giresun
16:00 TRT (UTC+3)	Campuzano 18'; Bilazer (yellow card) 75'; Sainz (yellow card) 85'; Serginho (yellow card) 90+6'	Report	Gradel (yellow card) 85'; Arslan (yellow card) 87'	Stadium: Çotanak Sports Complex; Referee: Yaşar Kemal Uğurlu

20 April 2023 30	Ankaragücü	3–1	Giresunspor	Ankara
17:00 TRT (UTC+3)	Sowe 54', 90+7'; Antalyalı 74'; Hanousek (yellow card) 82'	Report	Diack 44' (o.g.); Kaplan (yellow card) 45+5'; Arias (yellow card) 56'	Stadium: Eryaman Stadium; Referee: Halil Umut Meler

24 April 2023 31	Giresunspor	2–4	İstanbul Başakşehir	Giresun
17:00 TRT (UTC+3)	Mejía (yellow card) 62'; Sainz 63', 90'; Davas (yellow card) 73'	Report	Januzaj 16', 35'; Figueiredo 25', 45+2'; Ié (yellow card) 37'; Türüç (yellow card) 62'; Şengezer (yellow card) 79'	Stadium: Çotanak Sports Complex; Referee: Zorbay Küçük

1 May 2023 32	İstanbulspor	1–0	Giresunspor	Istanbul
20:00 TRT (UTC+3)	Eze 10'; Deli (red card) 49'; Ergün (yellow card) 51'; Topalli (yellow card) 88'; Erdoğan (yellow card) 90+1'	Report	Bajić (penalty missed) 17'; Bilazer (yellow card) 52'; Sainz (yellow card) 90+1'	Stadium: Necmi Kadıoğlu Stadium; Referee: Mete Kalkavan

7 May 2023 33	Giresunspor	1–1	Fenerbahçe	Giresun
19:00 TRT (UTC+3)	Seven (yellow card) 26'; Bajić 68'; Arias (yellow card) 70'; Uludağ (yellow card) 87'; Genç (yellow card) 90+5'; Piri (yellow card) 90+9'	Report	Batshuayi 20' (pen.); Yüksek (yellow card) 45+1'; Osayi-Samuel (yellow card) 90+8'	Stadium: Çotanak Sports Complex; Referee: Bahattin Şimşek

34	Giresunspor	3–0 (w/o)	Hatayspor	Giresun
		Report		Stadium: Çotanak Sports Complex

35	Gaziantep	0–3 (w/o)	Giresunspor	Gaziantep
		Report		Stadium: Gaziantep Stadium

30 May 2023 36	Giresunspor	2–4	Trabzonspor	Giresun
20:00 TRT (UTC+3)	Genç 74'; Bajić 80'; Savićević (yellow card) 90'	Report	Bozok 29', 58'; Bardhi 34'; Bakasetas (yellow card) 39', (goal) 72' (pen.); Türkmen (yellow card) 48'; Marković (yellow card) 90+6'	Stadium: Çotanak Sports Complex; Referee: Arda Kardeşler

3 June 2023 37	Ümraniyespor	0–1	Giresunspor	Istanbul
19:00 TRT (UTC+3)	Gürbulak (yellow card) 6'; Sackey (yellow card) 10'; Glumac (yellow card) 58'; Göksu (yellow card) 77'; Eser (yellow card) 87'	Report	Seven (yellow card) 42'; Bajić 45'	Stadium: Ümraniye Municipality City Stadium; Referee: Zorbay Küçük

7 June 2023 38	Giresunspor	2–0	Antalyaspor	Giresun
20:00 TRT (UTC+3)	Campuzano (yellow card) 12'; Bajić 17' (pen.); Sainz 59', (yellow card) 51' (yellow-red card) 60'	Report	Ghacha (yellow card) 35'	Stadium: Çotanak Sports Complex; Referee: Kadir Sağlam

=== Turkish Cup ===
20 October 2022 Third round	Giresunspor	3–1	Amasyaspor	Giresun
17:30 TRT (UTC+3)	Senghor (yellow card) 35'; Akpınar 42'; Sağlam 66'; Serginho 70'; Akpınar (yellow card) 88'; Kurt (yellow card) 90+1'	Report	Seven 38' (o.g.)	Stadium: Çotanak Sports Complex; Referee: Direnç Tonusluoğlu

9 November 2022 Fourth round	Giresunspor	3–2	Ankaraspor	Giresun
13:00 TRT (UTC+3)	Seven (yellow card) 8'; Genç (yellow card) 42'; Savićević 60', 90+3'; Sainz 70'; Ülvan (yellow card) 74'	Report	Bekdemir 18'; Köse 53'; Nas (yellow card) 70'; Efe (red card) 89'	Stadium: Çotanak Sports Complex; Referee: Yiğit Arslan

21 December 2022 Fifth round	Giresunspor	0–5	Karacabey Belediyespor	Giresun
13:00 TRT (UTC+3)	Talha Ülvan (yellow card) 7'; Serginho (yellow card) 63'; Sainz (yellow card) 74'	Report	Kuşan 10', 32'; Balıkçı 50', 68'; Turhan (yellow card) 55'; Karakabak (yellow card) 63'; Aktay 84' (pen.)	Stadium: Çotanak Sports Complex; Referee: Direnç Tonusluoğlu
