= 2023–24 Giresunspor season =

Giresunspor
2023–24 season
- Manager: Mustafa Kaplan (until 25 October); Mehmet Birinci (from 25 October to 25 December); Serhat Güller (from 2 January)
- Stadium: Çotanak Sports Complex
- TFF First League: 18th (relegated)
- Turkish Cup: Third round

The 2023–24 season was Giresunspor's 99th season in existence and first one back in the TFF First League, the second division of Turkish football. They also competed in the Turkish Cup.

== Players ==
=== First-team squad ===
As of 23 September 2023

Note: Flags indicate national team as defined under FIFA eligibility rules; some limited exceptions apply. Players may hold more than one non-FIFA nationality.

No.	Pos.	Nation	Player
1	GK	TUR	Erkan Anapa
4	DF	TUR	Fatih Yılmaz
5	MF	SEN	Faustin Senghor
7	DF	TUR	Talha Ülvan
9	FW	TUR	Mert Kurt
10	MF	TUR	Çekdar Orhan
11	FW	CUW	Brandley Kuwas
17	DF	TUR	Şahin Dik
21	FW	TUR	Miraç Çakıroğlu
22	DF	TUR	Ali Akçay
23	DF	TUR	Ertuğrul Şenlikoğlu
24	GK	TUR	Göktan Cörüt
26	MF	MNE	Vukan Savićević
28	MF	TUR	Erol Can Akdağ (captain)
30	FW	TUR	Yunus Emre Kobya

No.	Pos.	Nation	Player
37	DF	TUR	Kadir Seven
50	DF	TUR	Barış Gün
63	FW	TUR	Mustafa Eren Keskin
66	MF	TUR	Alperen Köşker
70	FW	TUR	Emre Nizam
77	DF	TUR	Mehmet Keskin
81	MF	TUR	Enishan Ceylan
82	MF	TUR	Arda Cebeci
84	DF	TUR	Metin Caner Akbayrak
88	DF	TUR	Ahmet Kara
94	DF	TUR	Anıl Yiğit Çınar
97	MF	TUR	Furkan Kütük
99	DF	TUR	Faruk Can Genç
—	MF	TUR	Eren Kaçar

== Transfers ==
=== In ===
Pos.	Player	Transferred from	Fee	Date	Source

=== Out ===
Pos.	Player	Transferred to	Fee	Date	Source

== Pre-season and friendlies ==
Win Draw Loss

10 September 2023 Friendly	Samsunspor (Turkey)	6–1	(Turkey) Giresunspor

== Competitions ==
=== Overall record ===
Competition	First match	Last match	Starting round	Final position	Record							
Competition	First match	Last match	Starting round	Final position	Pld	W	D	L	GF	GA	GD	Win %
TFF First League	12 August 2023	10 May 2024	Matchday 1	18th	34	2	4	28	16	71	−55	5.88
Turkish Cup	1 November 2023		Third round	Third round	1	0	1	0	1	1	+0	0.00
Total					35	2	5	28	17	72	−55	5.71

Source: Soccerway

=== TFF First League ===
==== League table ====
Pos	Team	Pld	W	D	L	GF	GA	GD	Pts	Qualification or relegation
15	Şanlıurfaspor	34	9	11	14	32	37	−5	38 (Note: Ranked on goal difference: Şanlıurfaspor (–5), Tuzlaspor (–12).)	
16	Tuzlaspor (R)	34	9	11	14	35	47	−12	38	Relegation to the TFF Second League
17	Altay (Note: Altay have been deducted 3 points by the Club Licensing Board for failing to meet the licensing requirements. Later, another 6 points have been deducted.) (R)	34	5	4	25	16	76	−60	10	Relegation to the TFF Second League
18	Giresunspor (Note: Giresunspor have been deducted 3 points.) (R)	34	2	4	28	16	71	−55	7	Relegation to the TFF Second League
19	Yeni Malatyaspor (Note: Yeni Malatyaspor withdrew from the league following the 2023 Turkey–Syria earthquake and will not be relegated at the end of the season.)	0	0	0	0	0	0	0	0	Withdrew

Updated to match(es) played on 11 May 2024. Source: TFF
Rules for classification: 1) Points; 2) Head-to-head points; 3) Head-to-head goal difference; 4) Head-to-head goals scored; 5) Goal difference; 6) Goals scored
(R) Relegated

==== Results summary ====
Overall								Home						Away					
Pld	W	D	L	GF	GA	GD	Pts	W	D	L	GF	GA	GD	W	D	L	GF	GA	GD
34	2	4	28	16	71	−55	10	1	3	13	5	30	−25	1	1	15	11	41	−30

==== Results by round ====
Round	1	2	3	4	5	6	7	8	9	10	11	12	13	14	15	16	17	18	19	20	21	22	23	24	25
Ground	H	A	H	A	H	A	H	A	H	A	H	A	H	A	A	H	A	A	H	A	H	A	H	A	H
Result	L	W	L	L	D	L	D	L	L	D	W	L	L	L	L	L	L	L	L	L	D	L	L	L	
Position	14	9	11	14	13	15	15	16	17	17	17	17	17	17	17	17	18	18	18	18	18	18	18	18	18

Updated to match(es) played on 23 February 2024. Source:
A = Away; H = Home; W = Win; D = Draw; L = Loss

==== Matches ====
The league fixtures were unveiled on 19 July 2023.

12 August 2023 1	Giresunspor	0–1	Bodrum	Giresun
19:15				Stadium: Çotanak Sports Complex

18 August 2023 2	Çorum	0–2	Giresunspor	Çorum
21:00				Stadium: Çorum City Stadium

28 August 2023 3	Giresunspor	0–1	Bandırmaspor	Giresun
21:00				Stadium: Çotanak Sports Complex

23 February 2024 24	Altay	1–0	Giresunspor	İzmir
20:00				Stadium: Alsancak Mustafa Denizli Stadium

3 March 2024 25	Giresunspor	0–1	Adanaspor	Giresun
13:30				Stadium: Çotanak Sports Complex

17 March 2024 27	Giresunspor	0–6	Şanlıurfaspor	Giresun
				Stadium: Çotanak Sports Complex

8 April 2024 29	Giresunspor	0–3	Tuzlaspor	Giresun
				Stadium: Çotanak Sports Complex

28 April 2024 32	Giresunspor	2–3	Sakaryaspor	Giresun
				Stadium: Çotanak Sports Complex

10 May 2024 34	Giresunspor	1–2	Ümraniyespor	Giresun
				Stadium: Çotanak Sports Complex
