= 2022–23 Süper Lig =

Süper Lig
- Season: 2022–23
- Dates: 5 August 2022 – 7 June 2023
- Champions: Galatasaray; 23rd title
- Relegated: Giresunspor; Ümraniyespor
- Champions League: Galatasaray
- Europa Conference League: Fenerbahçe; Beşiktaş; Adana Demirspor
- Matches: 342
- Goals: 1,041 (3.04 per match)
- Top goalscorer: Enner Valencia (29 goals)
- Biggest home win: Adana Demirspor 6–0 İstanbulspor (5 January 2023); Galatasaray 6–0 Kayserispor (14 April 2023)
- Biggest away win: Başakşehir 0–7 Galatasaray (12 November 2022)
- Highest scoring: Fenerbahçe 5–4 Fatih Karagümrük (9 October 2022)
- Longest winning run: Galatasaray (14 matches)
- Longest unbeaten run: Galatasaray (15 matches)
- Longest winless run: Gaziantep; Hatayspor (15 matches)
- Longest losing run: Gaziantep; Hatayspor (15 matches)
- Highest attendance: 51,005; Galatasaray 3–0 Fenerbahçe (4 June 2023)
- Lowest attendance: 144; Fatih Karagümrük 2–1 Gaziantep (13 November 2022)

The 2022–23 Süper Lig, officially called the Spor Toto Süper Lig 2022–23 season, was the 65th season of the Süper Lig, the highest tier football league of Turkey. The season has started on 5 August 2022 and ended on 7 June 2023.

Galatasaray clinched their 23rd league title, and first since the 2018–19 season, on 30 May 2023, with two games to spare.

Due to Turkey's poor UEFA ranking (20th at the end of the 2021–22 season), in this season only four teams qualified for the European cups instead of the usual five. The team in first place entered the 2023–24 UEFA Champions League's second qualifying round, while teams in second and third place, as well the winners of the 2022–23 Turkish Cup, entered the 2023–24 UEFA Europa Conference League's second qualifying round.

== Teams ==
A total of 19 teams contested the league, including 16 sides from the 2021–22 season and 2021–22 TFF First League champions Ankaragücü, runners-up Ümraniyespor and play-off winners İstanbulspor. Ankaragücü immediately returned to top level, while Ümraniyespor competed in the Süper Lig for the first time in their history. İstanbulspor returned to top level after 17 years. Two teams were relegated to the 2023–24 TFF First League.

=== Stadiums and locations ===
Location of teams in 2022–23 Süper Lig
Istanbul Province clubs

Team	Home city	Stadium	Capacity
Adana Demirspor	Adana	New Adana Stadium	33,543
Alanyaspor	Antalya (Alanya)	Kırbıyık Holding Stadium	10,130
Ankaragücü	Ankara	Eryaman Stadium	20,560
Antalyaspor	Antalya (Muratpaşa)	Corendon Airlines Park	32,537
Beşiktaş	Istanbul (Beşiktaş)	Vodafone Park	42,590
Fatih Karagümrük	Istanbul (Fatih)	Atatürk Olympic Stadium	76,761
Fenerbahçe	Istanbul (Kadıköy)	Şükrü Saracoğlu Stadium	47,834
Galatasaray	Istanbul (Sarıyer)	Nef Stadium	52,280
Gaziantep	Gaziantep	Kalyon Stadium	33,502
Giresunspor	Giresun	Çotanak Sports Complex	22,028
Hatayspor	Antakya	New Hatay Stadium	25,000
İstanbul Başakşehir	Istanbul (Başakşehir)	Başakşehir Fatih Terim Stadium	17,156
İstanbulspor	Istanbul (Büyükçekmece)	Esenyurt Necmi Kadıoğlu Stadium	7,500
Kasımpaşa	Istanbul (Beyoğlu)	Recep Tayyip Erdoğan Stadium	14,234
Kayserispor	Kayseri	RHG Enertürk Enerji Stadium	32,864
Konyaspor	Konya	Medaş Konya Metropolitan Stadium	42,000
Sivasspor	Sivas	New Sivas 4 Eylül Stadium	27,532
Trabzonspor	Trabzon	Şenol Güneş Sports Complex	40,782
Ümraniyespor	Istanbul (Ümraniye)	Ümraniye Municipality City Stadium	3,513

=== Personnel and sponsorship ===
Team	Head coach	Captain	Kit manufacturer	Sponsor
Adana Demirspor	(Italy) Vincenzo Montella	(Switzerland) Gökhan Inler	Tempo	Bitexen
Alanyaspor	(Turkey) Ömer Erdoğan	(Turkey) Efecan Karaca	Uhlsport	TAV Airports
Ankaragücü	(Turkey) Tolunay Kafkas	(Norway) Ghayas Zahid	Joma	Portaş
Antalyaspor	(Turkey) Nuri Şahin	(Turkey) Hakan Özmert	Nike	VavaCars
Beşiktaş	(Turkey) Şenol Güneş	(Canada) Atiba Hutchinson	Adidas	Rain
Fatih Karagümrük	(Turkey) Alparslan Erdem (Interim)	(Italy) Emiliano Viviano	Wulfz	VavaCars
Fenerbahçe	(Portugal) Jorge Jesus	(Turkey) Altay Bayındır	Puma	Avis
Galatasaray	(Turkey) Okan Buruk	(Uruguay) Fernando Muslera	Nike	Sixt
Gaziantep	(Turkey) Erdal Güneş	(Turkey) Günay Güvenç	Nike	Sanko/Süper Film
Giresunspor	(Turkey) İrfan Buz	(Turkey) Onurcan Piri	Diadora	Bitexen
Hatayspor	(Turkey) Volkan Demirel	(Turkey) Kamil Çörekçi	Nike	Bitexen
İstanbul Başakşehir	(Turkey) Emre Belözoğlu	(Turkey) Mahmut Tekdemir	Joma	Balkar Group/Sunny Elektronik/Trendyol/Turkish Airlines (in UEFA matches)
İstanbulspor	(Turkey) Fatih Tekke	(Albania) Eduard Rroca	Jako	Uğur Okulları/Yukatel
Kasımpaşa	(Turkey) Kemal Özdeş	(Bosnia and Herzegovina) Haris Hajradinović	Puma	Ciner
Kayserispor	(Turkey) Çağdaş Atan	(Turkey) İlhan Parlak	Nike	İstikbal
Konyaspor	(Serbia) Aleksandar Stanojević	(Bosnia and Herzegovina) Ibrahim Šehić	New Balance	Arabam.com
Sivasspor	(Turkey) Rıza Çalımbay	(Turkey) Ziya Erdal	Tony Montana	Bitexen
Trabzonspor	(Croatia) Nenad Bjelica	(Turkey) Uğurcan Çakır	Macron	Vestel
Ümraniyespor	(Turkey) Mustafa Er	(Croatia) Tomislav Glumac	Nike	HangiKredi

=== Managerial changes ===
Team	Outgoing manager	Manner of departure	Date of vacancy	Position in table	Replaced by	Date of appointment
Hatayspor	(Turkey) Ömer Erdoğan	Resignation	23 May 2022	Pre-season	(Turkey) Serkan Özbalta	1 June 2022
Fatih Karagümrük	(Turkey) Volkan Demirel	Sacked	27 May 2022	Pre-season	(Italy) Andrea Pirlo	10 June 2022
Kayserispor	(Turkey) Hikmet Karaman	End of contract	31 May 2022	Pre-season	(Turkey) Çağdaş Atan	15 June 2022
Fenerbahçe	(Turkey) İsmail Kartal	End of contract	31 May 2022	Pre-season	(Portugal) Jorge Jesus	2 June 2022
Galatasaray	(Spain) Domènec Torrent	Sacked	21 June 2022	Pre-season	(Turkey) Okan Buruk	23 June 2022
Kasımpaşa	(Turkey) Sami Uğurlu	Resignation	16 August 2022	19th	(Bulgaria) Şenol Can	17 August 2022
Ankaragücü	(Turkey) Mustafa Dalcı	Resignation	28 August 2022	17th	(Turkey) Ömer Erdoğan	29 August 2022
Hatayspor	(Turkey) Serkan Özbalta	Resignation	17 September 2022	19th	(Turkey) Volkan Demirel	21 September 2022
İstanbulspor	(Turkey) Osman Zeki Korkmaz	Resignation	24 October 2022	16th	(Turkey) Fatih Tekke	25 October 2022
Beşiktaş	(France) Valérien Ismaël	Sacked	26 October 2022	5th	(Turkey) Şenol Güneş	28 October 2022
Kasımpaşa	(Bulgaria) Şenol Can	Mutual agreement	11 November 2022	12th	(Turkey) Selçuk İnan	22 November 2022
Konyaspor	(Turkey) İlhan Palut	Mutual agreement	16 January 2023	7th	(Serbia) Aleksandar Stanojević	17 January 2023
Gaziantep FK	(Turkey) Erol Bulut	Mutual agreement	27 January 2023	13th	(Turkey) Erdal Güneş	27 January 2023
Ankaragücü	(Turkey) Ömer Erdoğan	Resignation	4 February 2023	14th	(Turkey) Sedat Ağçay	20 February 2023
Alanyaspor	(Italy) Francesco Farioli	Mutual agreement	27 February 2023	12th	(Turkey) Ersun Yanal	27 February 2023
Trabzonspor	(Turkey) Abdullah Avcı	Resignation	8 March 2023	6th	(Turkey) Orhan Ak	8 March 2023
Kasımpaşa	(Turkey) Selçuk İnan	Mutual agreement	18 March 2023	12th	(Turkey) Kemal Özdeş	4 April 2023
Ankaragücü	(Turkey) Sedat Ağçay	Sacked	23 March 2023	15th	(Turkey) Tolunay Kafkas	23 March 2023
Trabzonspor	(Turkey) Orhan Ak	Resignation	4 April 2023	5th	(Croatia) Nenad Bjelica	18 April 2023
Ümraniyespor	(Turkey) Recep Uçar	Mutual agreement	19 April 2023	18th	(Turkey) Mustafa Er	20 April 2023
Alanyaspor	(Turkey) Ersun Yanal	Mutual agreement	19 April 2023	12th	(Turkey) Ömer Erdoğan	22 April 2023
Giresunspor	(Turkey) Hakan Keleş	Resignation	2 May 2023	16th	(Turkey) İrfan Buz	4 May 2023
Fatih Karagümrük	(Italy) Andrea Pirlo	Sacked	24 May 2023	9th	(Turkey) Alparslan Erdem (interim)	24 May 2023

=== Foreign players ===
Club	Player 1	Player 2	Player 3	Player 4	Player 5	Player 6	Player 7	Player 8	Player 9	Player 10	Player 11	Player 12	Player 13	Player 14	Player 15	Player 16	Former Players
Adana Demirspor	(Bosnia and Herzegovina) Goran Karačić	(Bosnia and Herzegovina) Hamza Jaganjac	(Cameroon) Kévin Soni	(Cameroon) Samuel Nongoh	(France) Benjamin Stambouli	(Morocco) Younès Belhanda	(Nigeria) David Akintola	(Nigeria) Henry Onyekuru	(North Macedonia) Jovan Manev	(Norway) Fredrik Gulbrandsen	(Norway) Jonas Svensson	(Paraguay) Jorge Morel	(Portugal) Kévin Rodrigues	(Senegal) Badou Ndiaye	(Senegal) Cherif Ndiaye		(Democratic Republic of the Congo) Britt Assombalonga (Iceland) Birkir Bjarnason (Italy) Mario Balotelli (Ivory Coast) Simon Deli (Russia) Artem Dzyuba (Ukraine) Yaroslav Rakitskyi
Alanyaspor	(Algeria) Zinedine Ferhat	(Angola) Wilson Eduardo	(Democratic Republic of the Congo) Arnaud Lusamba	(Egypt) Ahmed Hassan	(Greece) Efthymis Koulouris	(Iceland) Rúnar Rúnarsson	(Ivory Coast) Idrissa Doumbia	(Morocco) Zouhair Feddal	(Netherlands) Leroy Fer	(Portugal) Daniel Candeias	(Portugal) Ivan Cavaleiro	(Portugal) Pedro Pereira	(Senegal) Joher Rassoul	(Slovenia) Jure Balkovec			(Morocco) Oussama Targhalline (Portugal) Marafona (Senegal) Famara Diédhiou (Slovenia) Miha Mevlja
Ankaragücü	(Angola) Milson	(Bosnia and Herzegovina) Andrej Đokanović	(Bosnia and Herzegovina) Nihad Mujakić	(Czech Republic) Matěj Hanousek	(France) Enock Kwateng	(France) Kévin Malcuit	(The Gambia) Ali Sowe	(Georgia (country)) Giorgi Beridze	(Greece) Anastasios Chatzigiovanis	(Greece) Stelios Kitsiou	(Norway) Ghayas Zahid	(Portugal) Pedrinho	(Republic of the Congo) Bevic Moussiti-Oko	(Senegal) Lamine Diack	(Serbia) Uroš Radaković		(Brazil) Marlon Xavier (Italy) Federico Macheda (Portugal) Pêpê (Spain) Jesé (United States) Gboly Ariyibi
Antalyaspor	(Algeria) Houssam Ghacha	(Angola) Fredy	(Brazil) Fernando	(Brazil) Helton Leite	(Curaçao) Sherel Floranus	(Democratic Republic of the Congo) Christian Luyindama	(Hungary) Bálint Szabó	(Japan) Shoya Nakajima	(Kosovo) Amar Gërxhaliu	(Russia) Fyodor Kudryashov	(Senegal) Alassane Ndao	(Sweden) Sam Larsson	(Switzerland) Admir Mehmedi	(Ukraine) Mark Mampassi	(United States) Haji Wright		(Belgium) Ruud Boffin (Brazil) Luiz Adriano
Beşiktaş	(Algeria) Rachid Ghezzal	(Bosnia and Herzegovina) Amir Hadžiahmetović	(Brazil) Welinton	(Cameroon) Georges-Kévin Nkoudou	(Cameroon) Vincent Aboubakar	(Canada) Atiba Hutchinson	(Democratic Republic of the Congo) Arthur Masuaku	(Democratic Republic of the Congo) Jackson Muleka	(England) Dele Alli	(England) Nathan Redmond	(France) Valentin Rosier	(The Gambia) Omar Colley	(Morocco) Romain Saïss	(Romania) Alexandru Maxim	(Portugal) Gedson Fernandes		(Brazil) Souza (Netherlands) Wout Weghorst (Spain) Javi Montero (United States) Tyler Boyd
Fatih Karagümrük	(Algeria) Sofiane Feghouli	(The Gambia) Ebrima Colley	(Georgia (country)) Saba Lobzhanidze	(Italy) Andrea Bertolacci	(Italy) Davide Biraschi	(Italy) Emiliano Viviano	(Italy) Fabio Borini	(Italy) Matteo Ricci	(Kosovo) Ibrahim Drešević	(Netherlands) Brahim Darri	(Nigeria) Lawrence Nicholas	(Portugal) Bruno Rodrigues	(Russia) Magomed Ozdoyev	(Senegal) Mbaye Diagne	(Serbia) Adem Ljajić	(Uzbekistan) Otabek Shukurov	(Ivory Coast) Jean Evrard Kouassi (Nigeria) Ahmed Musa (Sierra Leone) Steven Caulker
Fenerbahçe	(Belgium) Michy Batshuayi	(Brazil) Gustavo Henrique	(Brazil) Lincoln	(Brazil) Luan Peres	(Brazil) Willian Arão	(Ecuador) Enner Valencia	(Hungary) Attila Szalai	(Italy) João Pedro	(Netherlands) Jayden Oosterwolde	(Nigeria) Bright Osayi-Samuel	(North Macedonia) Ezgjan Alioski	(Norway) Joshua King	(Portugal) Miguel Crespo	(Slovenia) Miha Zajc	(Uruguay) Diego Rossi		(Germany) Mërgim Berisha (Portugal) Bruma (Uruguay) Mauricio Lemos
Galatasaray	(Argentina) Mauro Icardi	(Belgium) Dries Mertens	(Canada) Sam Adekugbe	(Denmark) Mathias Ross	(Denmark) Victor Nelsson	(France) Bafétimbi Gomis	(France) Léo Dubois	(France) Sacha Boey	(Italy) Nicolò Zaniolo	(Kosovo) Milot Rashica	(Norway) Fredrik Midtsjø	(Portugal) Sérgio Oliveira	(Spain) Juan Mata	(Uruguay) Fernando Muslera	(Uruguay) Lucas Torreira		(Netherlands) Patrick van Aanholt (Romania) Alexandru Cicâldău (Switzerland) Haris Seferovic
Gaziantep	(Kazakhstan) Alexander Merkel	(Serbia) Marko Jevtović															(Brazil) João Figueiredo (Chile) Ángelo Sagal (Czech Republic) Matěj Hanousek (Czech Republic) Tomáš Pekhart (Greece) Stelios Kitsiou (Kosovo) Valmir Veliu (North Macedonia) Luka Stankovski (Norway) Torgeir Børven (Romania) Alin Toșca (Romania) Alexandru Maxim (Senegal) Papy Djilobodji (Serbia) Lazar Marković
Giresunspor	(Belgium) Mert Kurt	(Bosnia and Herzegovina) Riad Bajić	(Brazil) Serginho	(Colombia) Alexis Pérez	(Colombia) Jorman Campuzano	(Colombia) Robert Mejía	(Curaçao) Brandley Kuwas	(Montenegro) Vukan Savićević	(Senegal) Faustin Senghor	(Spain) Borja Sainz	(Uruguay) Ramón Arias						(Mali) Hamidou Traoré
Hatayspor	(Bosnia and Herzegovina) Ognjen Vranješ	(Cape Verde) Zé Luís	(France) Rayane Aabid	(Germany) Jeremy Dudziak	(Guinea) Simon Falette	(Portugal) Rúben Ribeiro	(Republic of the Congo) Dylan Saint-Louis										(Cameroon) Kévin Soni (Canada) Sam Adekugbe (France) Mehdi Boudjemaa (Georgia (country)) Saba Lobzhanidze (Ghana) Christian Atsu (Hungary) Kevin Varga (Liberia) Mohammed Kamara (Morocco) Ayoub El Kaabi
İstanbul Başakşehir	(Algeria) Ahmed Touba	(Argentina) Lucas Biglia	(Brazil) João Figueiredo	(Brazil) Léo Duarte	(Brazil) Lucas Lima	(China) Wu Shaocong	(Guinea-Bissau) Edgar Ié	(Israel) Eden Kartsev	(Italy) Stefano Okaka	(Poland) Patryk Szysz	(Senegal) Philippe Kény	(Serbia) Danijel Aleksić					(Belgium) Nacer Chadli (Brazil) Júnior Caiçara (Burkina Faso) Bertrand Traoré (Burundi) Youssouf Ndayishimiye (France) Enzo Crivelli (France) Mounir Chouiar (Moldova) Alexandru Epureanu (Nigeria) Azubuike Okechukwu (Republic of the Congo) Francis Nzaba
İstanbulspor	(Albania) Eduard Rroca	(Albania) Sindrit Guri	(Bosnia and Herzegovina) Adi Mehremić	(Bosnia and Herzegovina) Denis Kovacevic	(Democratic Republic of the Congo) Jason Lokilo	(Denmark) David Jensen	(England) Demeaco Duhaney	(Ghana) Raymond Owusu	(Ivory Coast) Simon Deli	(Kosovo) Florian Loshaj	(Kosovo) Jetmir Topalli	(Kosovo) Valmir Veliu	(Mali) Mahamadou Ba	(Nigeria) Emeka Eze	(Nigeria) Michael Ologo	(North Macedonia) Valon Ethemi	(Albania) Kristal Abazaj (Bosnia and Herzegovina) Aldin Čajić (Croatia) Marin Ljubić (Germany) Patrick Ebert
Kasımpaşa	(Bosnia and Herzegovina) Daniel Graovac	(Bosnia and Herzegovina) Haris Hajradinović	(Brazil) Fabiano	(Cameroon) Stéphane Bahoken	(France) Mounir Chouiar	(France) Valentin Eysseric	(Guinea) Bengali-Fodé Koita	(Iran) Ali Gholizadeh	(Kosovo) Florent Hadergjonaj	(Martinique) Mickaël Malsa	(Senegal) Mamadou Fall	(Senegal) Papy Djilobodji	(Suriname) Ryan Donk	(Tunisia) Mortadha Ben Ouanes			(Italy) Raoul Petretta (Kosovo) Bersant Celina (Netherlands) Jeffrey Bruma
Kayserispor	(Brazil) Gustavo Campanharo	(Cameroon) Olivier Kemen	(France) Lionel Carole	(Ghana) Bernard Mensah	(Ghana) Joseph Attamah	(Ghana) Yaw Ackah	(Greece) Dimitrios Kolovetsios	(Guinea-Bissau) Carlos Mané	(Iran) Ali Karimi	(Iran) Majid Hosseini	(Nigeria) Anthony Uzodimma	(Portugal) Miguel Cardoso	(Senegal) Mame Thiam	(Switzerland) Mario Gavranović			(Italy) Andrea Bertolacci
Konyaspor	(Albania) Endri Çekiçi	(Angola) Bruno Paz	(Azerbaijan) Mahir Emreli	(Brazil) Guilherme	(Bosnia and Herzegovina) Ibrahim Šehić	(Colombia) Marlos Moreno	(Costa Rica) Francisco Calvo	(Croatia) Domagoj Pavičić	(Croatia) Niko Rak	(Croatia) Robert Murić	(Greece) Andreas Bouchalakis	(Poland) Konrad Michalak	(Senegal) Mame Biram Diouf	(Spain) Alejandro Pozuelo	(Uganda) Uche Ikpeazu		(Albania) Sokol Cikalleshi (Bosnia and Herzegovina) Amir Hadžiahmetović (Bosnia and Herzegovina) Amar Rahmanović (Brazil) Amilton (Democratic Republic of the Congo) Paul-José M'Poku (Kosovo) Zymer Bytyqi
Sivasspor	(Cameroon) Clinton N'Jie	(Ecuador) Jordy Caicedo	(Gabon) Aaron Appindangoyé	(Ghana) Isaac Cofie	(Greece) Charis Charisis	(Greece) Dimitrios Goutas	(Ivory Coast) Kader Keïta	(Ivory Coast) Max Gradel	(Mali) Mustapha Yatabaré	(Mali) Samba Camara	(Nigeria) Ahmed Musa	(Nigeria) Leke James	(Norway) Fredrik Ulvestad	(Poland) Karol Angielski	(Spain) Samuel Sáiz		(Israel) Dia Saba (Nigeria) Olarenwaju Kayode
Trabzonspor	(Bosnia and Herzegovina) Edin Višća	(Brazil) Bruno Peres	(Brazil) Vitor Hugo	(Denmark) Jens Stryger	(Egypt) Trézéguet	(Greece) Anastasios Bakasetas	(Greece) Manolis Siopis	(Ivory Coast) Jean-Philippe Gbamin	(Morocco) Montasser Lahtimi	(North Macedonia) Enis Bardhi	(Serbia) Lazar Marković	(Slovakia) Marek Hamšík	(Spain) Marc Bartra	(Suriname) Stefano Denswil	(Uruguay) Maxi Gómez		(Cape Verde) Djaniny (Denmark) Andreas Cornelius (Ivory Coast) Jean Evrard Kouassi
Ümraniyespor	(Albania) Ermir Lenjani	(Angola) Geraldo	(Brazil) Allyson	(Bulgaria) Strahil Popov	(Croatia) Antonio Mršić	(Croatia) Tomislav Glumac	(Ghana) Isaac Sackey	(Moldova) Alexandru Epureanu	(Nigeria) Jesse Sekidika	(Nigeria) Olarenwaju Kayode	(Republic of the Congo) Durel Avounou	(Romania) Valentin Gheorghe	(Tunisia) Adel Bettaieb				(Georgia (country)) Nika Gagnidze (Venezuela) Yonathan Del Valle

== League table ==
Pos	Team	Pld	W	D	L	GF	GA	GD	Pts	Qualification or relegation
1	Galatasaray (C)	36	28	4	4	83	27	+56	88	Qualification for the Champions League second qualifying round
2	Fenerbahçe	36	25	5	6	87	42	+45	80	Qualification for the Europa Conference League second qualifying round
3	Beşiktaş	36	23	9	4	78	36	+42	78	Qualification for the Europa Conference League second qualifying round
4	Adana Demirspor	36	20	9	7	76	45	+31	69	Qualification for the Europa Conference League second qualifying round
5	Başakşehir	36	18	8	10	54	37	+17	62	
6	Trabzonspor	36	17	6	13	64	54	+10	57	
7	Fatih Karagümrük	36	13	12	11	75	63	+12	51	
8	Konyaspor	36	12	15	9	49	41	+8	51	
9	Kayserispor	36	15	5	16	55	61	−6	47 (Note: Reduction of 3 points by decision of the Turkish Federation.)	
10	Kasımpaşa	36	12	7	17	45	61	−16	43	
11	Ankaragücü	36	12	6	18	43	53	−10	42	
12	İstanbulspor	36	12	5	19	47	63	−16	41 (Note: Head-to-head points: İstanbulspor 11, Antalyaspor 10, Sivasspor 8, Alanyaspor 4.)	
13	Antalyaspor	36	11	8	17	46	55	−9	41	
14	Sivasspor	36	11	8	17	46	54	−8	41	
15	Alanyaspor	36	11	8	17	54	70	−16	41	
16	Giresunspor (R)	36	10	10	16	42	60	−18	40	Relegation to TFF First League
17	Ümraniyespor (R)	36	7	9	20	47	64	−17	30	Relegation to TFF First League
18	Gaziantep (Note: On 12 February 2023, Gaziantep and Hatayspor withdrew from the league following the 2023 Turkey–Syria earthquake and were not relegated at the end of the season.)	36	6	7	23	31	72	−41	25	Withdrawn
19	Hatayspor	36	6	5	25	19	83	−64	23	Withdrawn

Source: Süper Lig
Rules for classification: 1) Points; 2) Head-to-head points; 3) Head-to-head goal difference; 4) Head-to-head goals scored; 5) Goal difference; 6) Goals scored; 7) Play-off.
(C) Champions; (R) Relegated

== Results ==
Home \ Away	ADE	ALA	ANK	ANT	BEŞ	FKA	FEN	GAL	GFK	GİR	HAT	İBA	İST	KAS	KAY	KON	SİV	TRA	ÜMR
Adana Demirspor	—	4–2	3–1	2–0	1–4	2–1	1–1	0–0	3–0 (Note: Awarded)	1–1	3–0	2–3	6–0	5–0	5–3	1–1	3–0	3–2	1–0
Alanyaspor	0–0	—	2–1	3–2	3–3	2–2	1–3	1–4	2–0	1–1	3–0	1–0	0–1	1–3	3–1	0–3	0–3	5–0	1–0
Ankaragücü	1–2	2–0	—	1–1	2–3	0–2	0–3	1–4	0–2	3–1	4–1	1–2	3–2	0–0	2–1	0–0	2–1	1–1	1–2
Antalyaspor	0–3	3–1	0–2	—	1–3	4–2	1–2	0–1	1–0	2–2	3–0	0–0	2–1	0–2	4–0	1–1	1–2	5–2	3–2
Beşiktaş	1–0	3–0	2–1	0–0	—	4–1	0–0	3–1	3–0	3–1	3–0	0–1	3–1	2–1	1–0	3–3	3–1	2–2	5–2
Fatih Karagümrük	2–3	2–4	4–1	0–1	1–1	—	1–2	0–2	3–3	1–1	3–0	2–2	1–2	3–0	2–0	3–3	4–3	4–1	4–2
Fenerbahçe	4–2	5–0	2–1	2–0	2–4	5–4	—	0–3	3–0	1–2	4–0	1–0	3–3	5–1	2–0	4–0	1–0	3–1	3–3
Galatasaray	2–0	2–2	2–1	2–1	2–1	3–3	3–0	—	2–1	0–1	4–0	1–0	2–1	1–0	6–0	2–1	2–0	2–1	3–2
Gaziantep	1–1	0–3	1–0	5–2	1–1	0–3	1–2	0–3	—	0–3	4–1	1–1	0–3	0–3	1–2	0–3	1–2	0–3	1–1
Giresunspor	2–3	2–2	1–1	2–0	0–1	2–2	1–1	0–4	2–1	—	3–0	2–4	3–2	1–0	1–2	0–1	1–0	2–4	0–1
Hatayspor	1–1	1–0	0–3	0–0	2–1	0–3	0–3	0–3	1–2	1–1	—	3–3	0–3	1–0	0–4	0–3	0–3	2–1	0–3
İstanbul Başakşehir	2–1	2–0	1–0	2–0	0–2	0–0	1–2	0–7	3–0	3–1	3–0	—	2–0	4–0	2–0	2–0	0–2	3–1	1–1
İstanbulspor	0–2	2–1	1–2	3–3	2–2	0–1	2–5	0–2	1–1	1–0	0–1	1–0	—	2–1	2–4	0–4	3–0	0–2	4–0
Kasımpaşa	1–4	4–1	1–1	3–1	2–5	2–2	0–6	2–3	1–0	5–1	1–0	1–3	1–0	—	0–1	1–2	1–2	2–0	1–1
Kayserispor	2–2	0–4	0–1	1–0	0–2	2–4	1–2	2–1	3–0	3–0	3–0	1–0	1–0	0–0	—	1–2	4–1	1–2	3–1
Konyaspor	1–2	2–2	0–1	1–1	1–2	1–1	1–0	2–1	0–1	0–0	1–0	0–0	0–1	1–1	2–2	—	2–2	2–1	1–0
Sivasspor	1–2	1–1	2–0	0–2	1–0	0–0	1–3	1–2	1–1	3–0	1–2	1–1	1–1	1–2	1–1	1–0	—	4–1	2–2
Trabzonspor	4–1	5–1	2–0	2–0	0–0	4–1	2–0	0–0	3–2	3–0	1–0	1–0	4–0	0–0	3–4	2–2	1–0	—	1–2
Ümraniyespor	1–1	3–1	1–2	0–1	0–2	1–3	1–2	0–1	3–0	0–1	2–2	1–3	0–2	1–2	2–2	2–2	4–1	0–1	—

Source: Turkish Football Federation (in Turkish)
Legend: Blue = home team win; Yellow = draw; Red = away team win.
For upcoming matches, an "a" indicates there is an article about the rivalry between the two participants.

== Number of teams by region ==
Number	Region	Team(s)
8	Marmara	Beşiktaş, Fatih Karagümrük, Fenerbahçe, Galatasaray, İstanbul Başakşehir, İstanbulspor, Kasımpaşa and Ümraniyespor
4	Central Anatolia	Ankaragücü, Kayserispor, Konyaspor and Sivasspor
4	Mediterranean	Adana Demirspor, Alanyaspor, Antalyaspor and Hatayspor
2	Black Sea	Giresunspor and Trabzonspor
1	Southeastern Anatolia	Gaziantep

== Statistics ==
=== Top scorers ===
Rank	Player	Club(s)	Goals
1	(Ecuador) Enner Valencia	Fenerbahçe	29
2	(Senegal) Mbaye Diagne	Fatih Karagümrük	23
3	(Argentina) Mauro Icardi	Galatasaray	22
4	(Italy) Fabio Borini	Fatih Karagümrük	20
5	(Turkey) Umut Nayir	Ümraniyespor	17
6	(Turkey) Cenk Tosun	Beşiktaş	15
6	(United States) Haji Wright	Antalyaspor	15
8	(Cameroon) Vincent Aboubakar	Beşiktaş	13
8	(Bosnia and Herzegovina) Riad Bajić	Giresunspor	13
10	(Belgium) Michy Batshuayi	Fenerbahçe	12
10	(North Macedonia) Valon Ethemi	İstanbulspor	12
10	(The Gambia) Ali Sowe	Ankaragücü	12

=== Clean sheets ===
Rank	Player	Club(s)	Clean sheets
1	(Uruguay) Fernando Muslera	Galatasaray	16
2	(Turkey) Uğurcan Çakır	Trabzonspor	11
3	(Turkey) Altay Bayındır	Fenerbahçe	9
4	(Turkey) Volkan Babacan	İstanbul Başakşehir	8
4	(Turkey) Ertaç Özbir	Adana Demirspor	8
4	(Bosnia and Herzegovina) Ibrahim Šehić	Konyaspor	8
7	(Netherlands) Bilal Bayazit	Kayserispor	7
7	(Turkey) Mert Günok	Beşiktaş	7
7	(Turkey) Ali Şaşal Vural	Sivasspor	7
10	(Turkey) Günay Güvenç	Gaziantep	6
10	(Denmark) David Jensen	İstanbulspor	6
10	(Iceland) Rúnar Alex Rúnarsson	Alanyaspor	6

=== Hat-tricks ===
Date	Player	For	Against	Result
26 August 2022	(Brazil) João Figueiredo	Gaziantep	Antalyaspor	5–2 (H)
9 October 2022	(Ecuador) Enner Valencia	Fenerbahçe	Fatih Karagümrük	5–4 (H)
30 October 2022	(Belgium) Michy Batshuayi	Fenerbahçe	İstanbulspor	5–2 (A)
12 November 2022	(Turkey) Kerem Aktürkoğlu	Galatasaray	İstanbul Başakşehir	7–0 (A)
8 January 2023	(Senegal) Mame Biram Diouf	Konyaspor	Fatih Karagümrük	3–3 (A)
29 January 2023	(Ecuador) Enner Valencia^{4}	Fenerbahçe	Kasımpaşa	5–1 (H)
4 March 2023	(Senegal) Mbaye Diagne	Fatih Karagümrük	Sivasspor	4–3 (H)
14 April 2023	(Argentina) Mauro Icardi	Galatasaray	Kayserispor	6–0 (H)
23 April 2023	(Senegal) Mame Thiam	Kayserispor	Adana Demirspor	3–5 (A)
7 May 2023	(Turkey) Umut Nayir	Ümraniyespor	Sivasspor	4–1 (H)

^{4} Player scored four goals

== Awards ==
=== Annual awards ===
Award	Winner	Club
Manager of the Season	(Turkey) Okan Buruk	Galatasaray

Team of the Season
Goalkeeper	(Uruguay) Fernando Muslera (Galatasaray)			
Defence	(France) Sacha Boey (Galatasaray)	(Turkey) Abdülkerim Bardakcı (Galatasaray)	(Denmark) Victor Nelsson (Galatasaray)	(Democratic Republic of the Congo) Arthur Masuaku (Beşiktaş)
Midfield	(Italy) Fabio Borini (Fatih Karagümrük)	(Uruguay) Lucas Torreira (Galatasaray)	(Senegal) Badou Ndiaye (Adana Demirspor)	(Turkey) Kerem Aktürkoğlu (Galatasaray)
Attack	(Argentina) Mauro Icardi (Galatasaray)		(Ecuador) Enner Valencia (Fenerbahçe)	

== Attendances ==
No.	Club	Average attendance	Highest
1	Galatasaray	45,186	50,453
2	Fenerbahçe	38,322	45,798
3	Beşiktaş	32,775	39,317
4	Trabzonspor	21,694	35,705
5	Adana Demirspor	16,929	29,327
6	Ankaragücü	11,164	17,450
7	Antalyaspor	10,414	24,002
8	Konyaspor	10,307	28,008
9	Kayserispor	7,838	16,441
10	Hatayspor	7,147	18,628
11	Giresunspor	6,331	14,924
12	Gaziantep FK	4,679	13,426
13	Sivasspor	4,215	12,622
14	Alanyaspor	3,668	7,840
15	İstanbul Başakşehir	2,584	7,771
16	İstanbulspor	2,475	15,871
17	Kasımpaşa	2,269	6,261
18	Ümraniye	2,028	12,095
19	Fatih Karagümrük	1,353	8,579
