= Fatih Yılmaz =

Fatih Yılmaz may refer to:

- Fatih Yılmaz (footballer, born 1989), Turkish football defensive midfielder
- Fatih Yılmaz (footballer, born 2002), Turkish football centre-back
