= Riad Bajić =

Bosnian footballer (born 1994)

Personal information
- Date of birth: 6 May 1994 (age 32)
- Place of birth: Sarajevo, Bosnia and Herzegovina
- Height: 1.89 m (6 ft 2 in)
- Position: Forward

Team information
- Current team: AEK Larnaca
- Number: 11

Youth career
- 2003–2013: Željezničar

Senior career*
| Years | Team | Apps | (Gls) |
| 2013–2015 | Željezničar | 48 | (18) |
| 2015–2017 | Konyaspor | 64 | (22) |
| 2017–2022 | Udinese | 5 | (0) |
| 2018–2019 | → İstanbul Başakşehir (loan) | 31 | (9) |
| 2019–2020 | → Konyaspor (loan) | 27 | (4) |
| 2020–2021 | → Ascoli (loan) | 34 | (12) |
| 2021–2022 | → Brescia (loan) | 29 | (3) |
| 2022–2023 | Giresunspor | 34 | (14) |
| 2023–2025 | Ankaragücü | 56 | (11) |
| 2025– | AEK Larnaca | 42 | (17) |

International career
| 2013 | Bosnia and Herzegovina U19 | 4 | (5) |
| 2014–2016 | Bosnia and Herzegovina U21 | 7 | (0) |
| 2017–2019 | Bosnia and Herzegovina | 12 | (0) |
- * Club domestic league appearances and goals as of 22 November 2026

Riad Bajić (pronounced [rǐad bâːjitɕ]; born 6 May 1994) is a Bosnian professional footballer who plays as a forward for Cypriot First Division club AEK Larnaca.

Bajić started his professional career at Željezničar, before joining Konyaspor in 2015. Two years later, he signed with Udinese, who loaned him to İstanbul Başakşehir in 2018, back to Konyaspor in 2019, to Ascoli in 2020 and to Brescia in 2021. The following year, he moved to Giresunspor. In 2023, Bajić switched to Ankaragücü. Two years later, he joined AEK Larnaca.

A former youth international for Bosnia and Herzegovina, Bajić made his senior international debut in 2017, earning 12 caps until 2019.

== Club career ==
=== Željezničar ===
Bajić came through the youth academy of his hometown club Željezničar, which he joined in 2003. In May 2013, he signed his first professional contract with the team. He made his professional debut in a UEFA Champions League qualifier against Viktoria Plzeň on 16 July at the age of 19. Two weeks later, he made his league debut against Zvijezda Gradačac. On 19 October, he scored his first professional goal in a triumph over Mladost Velika Obarska.

Bajić scored his first career hat-trick in a defeat of Zvijezda Gradačac on 27 September 2014.

With 15 goals, he finished the 2014–15 season as Bosnian Premier League top scorer.

=== Konyaspor ===
In August 2015, Bajić moved to Turkish outfit Konyaspor on a three-year deal. He made his official debut for the side on 15 August against Akhisarspor. On 17 October, he scored his first goal for the club in a victory over Gaziantepspor.

In January 2017, he prolonged his contract with the squad until June 2020. That season Bajić finished as team top scorer. His 17 goals were the most league goals scored by a Konyaspor player in a single campaign, beating the previous mark of 13 set by Theofanis Gekas.

He won his first title with Konyaspor, club's first trophy ever, on 31 May, by defeating İstanbul Başakşehir in the Turkish Cup final.

=== Udinese ===
In August, Bajić was transferred to Italian side Udinese for an undisclosed fee. He made his competitive debut for the squad in a Coppa Italia game against Frosinone on 12 August. Five weeks later, he made his league debut against Milan.

In January 2018, he was sent on a six-month loan to İstanbul Başakşehir. In June, his loan was extended for an additional season.

In June 2019, Bajić was loaned to his former team Konyaspor until the end of the season.

In September 2020, he was sent on a season-long loan to Ascoli.

In July 2021, he was loaned to Brescia for the remainder of the campaign.

=== Later stage of career ===
In July 2022, Bajić joined Giresunspor.

In June 2023, he switched to Ankaragücü.

In July 2025, he moved to Cypriot outfit AEK Larnaca.

== International career ==
Bajić represented Bosnia and Herzegovina at various youth levels.

In March 2015, he received his first senior call up, for a UEFA Euro 2016 qualifier against Andorra and a friendly game against Austria, but had to wait until 25 March 2017 to make his debut in a 2018 FIFA World Cup qualifier against Gibraltar.

== Personal life ==
Bajić married his long-time girlfriend Sanita in September 2019. Together they have a son named Dal.

== Career statistics ==
=== Club ===
As of match played 22 November 2026

Appearances and goals by club, season and competition
| Club | Season | League | | | National cup (Note: Includes Bosnian Cup, Turkish Cup, Coppa Italia, Cypriot Cup) | | Continental | | Other | | Total | |
| Club | Season | Division | Apps | Goals | Apps | Goals | Apps | Goals | Apps | Goals | Apps | Goals |
|---|---|---|---|---|---|---|---|---|---|---|---|---|
| Željezničar | 2013–14 | Bosnian Premier League | 18 | 3 | 5 | 2 | 2 (Note: Appearances in UEFA Champions League) | 0 | – | | 25 | 5 |
| Željezničar | 2014–15 | Bosnian Premier League | 28 | 15 | 2 | 1 | 4 (Note: Appearances in UEFA Europa League) | 1 | – | | 34 | 17 |
| Željezničar | 2015–16 | Bosnian Premier League | 2 | 0 | 0 | 0 | 6 | 2 | – | | 8 | 2 |
| Željezničar | Total | | 48 | 18 | 7 | 3 | 12 | 3 | – | | 67 | 24 |
| Konyaspor | 2015–16 | Süper Lig | 32 | 5 | 11 | 4 | – | | – | | 43 | 9 |
| Konyaspor | 2016–17 | Süper Lig | 32 | 17 | 10 | 3 | 6 | 0 | – | | 48 | 20 |
| Konyaspor | Total | | 64 | 22 | 21 | 7 | 6 | 0 | – | | 91 | 29 |
| Udinese | 2017–18 | Serie A | 5 | 0 | 2 | 0 | – | | – | | 7 | 0 |
| İstanbul Başakşehir (loan) | 2017–18 | Süper Lig | 9 | 3 | – | | – | | – | | 9 | 3 |
| İstanbul Başakşehir (loan) | 2018–19 | Süper Lig | 22 | 6 | 2 | 0 | 2 | 0 | – | | 26 | 6 |
| İstanbul Başakşehir (loan) | Total | | 31 | 9 | 2 | 0 | 2 | 0 | – | | 35 | 9 |
| Konyaspor (loan) | 2019–20 | Süper Lig | 27 | 4 | 1 | 0 | – | | – | | 28 | 4 |
| Ascoli (loan) | 2020–21 | Serie B | 34 | 12 | 0 | 0 | – | | – | | 34 | 12 |
| Brescia (loan) | 2021–22 | Serie B | 29 | 3 | 1 | 1 | – | | – | | 30 | 4 |
| Giresunspor | 2022–23 | Süper Lig | 34 | 14 | 1 | 0 | – | | – | | 35 | 14 |
| Ankaragücü | 2023–24 | Süper Lig | 24 | 4 | 3 | 1 | – | | – | | 27 | 5 |
| Ankaragücü | 2024–25 | 1. Lig | 32 | 7 | 3 | 0 | – | | – | | 35 | 7 |
| Ankaragücü | Total | | 56 | 11 | 6 | 1 | – | | – | | 62 | 12 |
| AEK Larnaca | 2025–26 | Cypriot First Division | 33 | 13 | 1 | 0 | 10 (Note: Two appearances in UEFA Europa League; eight appearances, two goals in UEFA Conference League) | 2 | 1 (Note: Appearance in Cypriot Super Cup) | 0 | 45 | 15 |
| AEK Larnaca | 2026–27 | Cypriot First Division | 9 | 4 | 1 | 0 | 2 (Note: Appearances in UEFA Conference League) | 1 | – | | 12 | 5 |
| AEK Larnaca | Total | | 42 | 17 | 2 | 0 | 12 | 3 | 1 | 0 | 57 | 20 |
| Career total | | | 370 | 110 | 43 | 12 | 32 | 6 | 1 | 0 | 446 | 128 |

=== International ===
Appearances and goals by national team and year
| National team | Year | Apps | Goals |
|---|---|---|---|
Bosnia and Herzegovina
| Bosnia and Herzegovina | 2017 | 3 | 0 |
| Bosnia and Herzegovina | 2018 | 6 | 0 |
| Bosnia and Herzegovina | 2019 | 3 | 0 |
| Total | | 12 | 0 |

== Honours ==
Konyaspor

- Turkish Cup: 2016–17

AEK Larnaca

- Cypriot Super Cup: 2025

Individual

- Bosnian Premier League top goalscorer: 2014–15
