= Alper Uludağ =

Turkish footballer

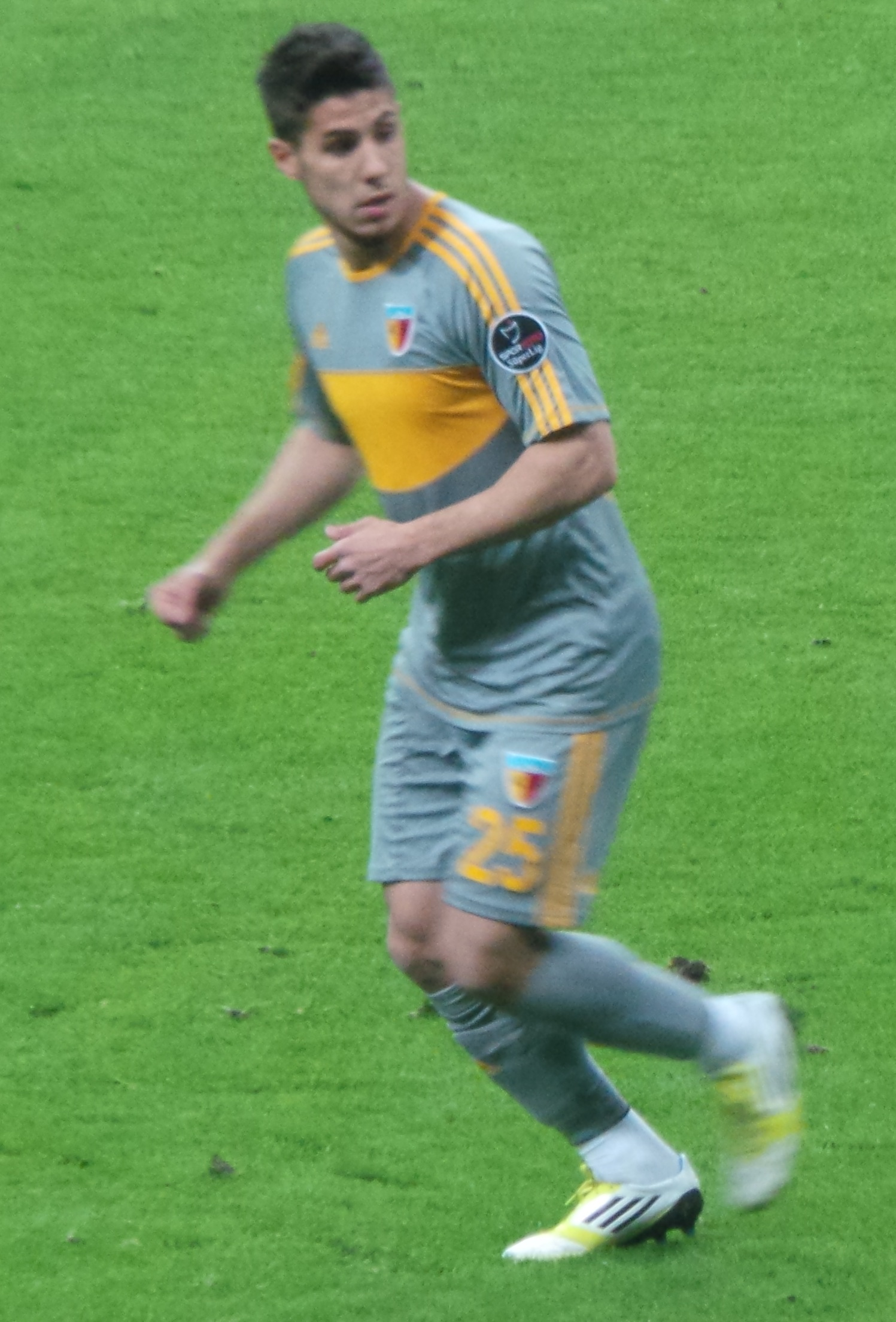
- Uludağ playing for Kayserispor in 2014

Personal information
- Date of birth: 11 December 1990 (age 35)
- Place of birth: Heusden-Zolder, Belgium
- Height: 1.80 m (5 ft 11 in)
- Positions: Left back; centre back; midfielder

Team information
- Current team: Yeni Mersin İdmanyurdu
- Number: 25

Youth career
- –2001: Verbroedering Geel
- 2001–2007: PSV
- 2007–2008: Alemannia Aachen

Senior career*
Years	Team	Apps	(Gls)
2008–2012	Alemannia Aachen II	40	(6)
2009–2012	Alemannia Aachen	61	(3)
2012–2013	FC Ingolstadt 04	1	(0)
2013–2015	Kayserispor	47	(0)
2015–2016	Trabzonspor	6	(0)
2016–2017	Akhisar Belediyespor	4	(0)
2017–2019	Gençlerbirliği	45	(6)
2019–2022	Konyaspor	29	(1)
2022	Adana Demirspor	13	(0)
2022–2023	Giresunspor	31	(1)
2023–2024	Ankaragücü	9	(1)
2024	Sakaryaspor	2	(0)
2024–2025	Ankaragücü	11	(0)
2025–	Yeni Mersin İdmanyurdu	10	(0)

International career
2005	Turkey U15	2	(0)
2010–2011	Turkey U21	8	(2)
2014	Turkey A2	1	(0)
- * Club domestic league appearances and goals as of 3 May 2025

Alper Uludağ (born 11 December 1990) is a Turkish professional footballer who plays as a left back for Yeni Mersin İdmanyurdu. He has been capped by the Turkey U-15 and U-21 squads.
