= Alexis Pérez =

Colombian footballer (born 1994)

Personal information
- Full name: Alexis Rafael Pérez Fontanilla
- Date of birth: 25 March 1994 (age 32)
- Place of birth: Barranquilla, Colombia
- Height: 1.82 m (6 ft 0 in)
- Position: Defender

Team information
- Current team: Al-Arabi
- Number: 25

Youth career
- –2013: Uniautónoma

Senior career*
| Years | Team | Apps | (Gls) |
| 2013–2015 | Uniautónoma | 57 | (1) |
| 2014 | → Villarreal B (loan) | 0 | (0) |
| 2015 | → Valladolid B (loan) | 12 | (0) |
| 2016–2017 | Atlético Junior | 47 | (1) |
| 2017–2020 | Querétaro | 52 | (4) |
| 2020–2021 | Lanús | 17 | (0) |
| 2021–2023 | Giresunspor | 59 | (2) |
| 2023–2025 | Al Wasl | 44 | (2) |
| 2025- | Al-Arabi | 8 | (1) |

International career
| 2015 | Colombia Olympic | 1 | (0) |
| 2023– | Colombia | 1 | (0) |
- * Club domestic league appearances and goals as of 17 January 2026

Alexis Rafael Pérez Fontanilla (born 25 March 1994) is a Colombian professional footballer who plays as a defender for Qatar Stars League club Al-Arabi.

== Personal life ==
Since 2014, Pérez has been in a relationship with English lawyer and model Leanne Shillingford, whom he met while playing in Spain.

== Career ==
=== Uniautónoma ===
Pérez made his professional debut in 2013 while playing for Uniautónoma.

==== Villarreal B/Real Valladolid (loan) ====
Late, he was loaned at Spanish teams Villarreal and Real Valladolid.

=== Atlético Junior ===
In 2015, Pérez returns to Uniautónoma, and then, in 2016 he signs out for Atlético Junior.

=== Querétaro F.C. ===
On 20 June 2017, Mexican club Querétaro announced the $2.7 Million dollar signing of Pérez on a four-year contract.

On 5 August 2017 Pérez made his first Liga MX appearance against Tigres UANL ending in a 1–1 draw.

== Career statistics ==
=== Club ===
As of match played 2 June 2024

Appearances and goals by club, season and competition
| Club | Season | League | | | National cup (Note: Includes Coppa Italia, Copa del Rey, DFB-Pokal, Taça de Portugal, Turkish Cup, UAE President's Cup) | | League cup (Note: Includes Taça da Liga, UAE League Cup) | | Continental | | Other | | Total | |
| Club | Season | Division | Apps | Goals | Apps | Goals | Apps | Goals | Apps | Goals | Apps | Goals | Apps | Goals |
|---|---|---|---|---|---|---|---|---|---|---|---|---|---|---|
| Uniautónoma | 2013 | Categoría Primera B | 24 | 1 | 0 | 0 | — | | — | | — | | 24 | 1 |
| Uniautónoma | 2014 | Categoría Primera A | 21 | 0 | 1 | 0 | — | | — | | — | | 22 | 0 |
| Uniautónoma | Total | | 45 | 1 | 1 | 0 | — | | — | | — | | 46 | 1 |
| Villarreal B (loan) | 2014–15 | Segunda División B | 0 | 0 | — | | — | | — | | — | | 0 | 0 |
| Valladolid B (loan) | 2014–15 | Segunda División B | 12 | 0 | — | | — | | — | | — | | 12 | 0 |
| Atlético Junior | 2016 | Categoría Primera A | 29 | 0 | 6 | 0 | — | | 7 | 0 | — | | 42 | 0 |
| Atlético Junior | 2017 | Categoría Primera A | 18 | 1 | — | | — | | 4 | 0 | — | | 22 | 1 |
| Atlético Junior | Total | | 47 | 1 | 6 | 0 | — | | 11 | 0 | — | | 64 | 1 |
| Querétaro | 2017–18 | Liga MX | 16 | 1 | 12 | 0 | — | | — | | — | | 28 | 1 |
| Querétaro | 2018–19 | Liga MX | 24 | 2 | 9 | 2 | — | | — | | — | | 33 | 4 |
| Querétaro | 2019–20 | Liga MX | 12 | 1 | 2 | 0 | — | | — | | — | | 14 | 1 |
| Querétaro | Total | | 52 | 4 | 23 | 2 | — | | — | | — | | 75 | 6 |
| Lanús | 2020–21 | Argentine Primera División | 6 | 0 | — | | — | | 8 | 0 | — | | 14 | 0 |
| Lanús | 2021 | Argentine Primera División | 11 | 0 | 1 | 0 | — | | 6 | 0 | — | | 18 | 0 |
| Lanús | Total | | 17 | 0 | 1 | 0 | — | | 14 | 0 | — | | 32 | 0 |
| Giresunspor | 2021–22 | Süper Lig | 34 | 2 | 1 | 0 | — | | — | | — | | 35 | 2 |
| Giresunspor | 2022–23 | Süper Lig | 25 | 0 | 1 | 0 | — | | — | | — | | 26 | 0 |
| Giresunspor | Total | | 59 | 2 | 2 | 0 | — | | — | | — | | 61 | 2 |
| Al Wasl | 2023–24 | UAE Pro League | 20 | 1 | 1 | 2 | 5 | 1 | — | | — | | 26 | 3 |
| Career total | | | 252 | 9 | 34 | 4 | 5 | 1 | 25 | 0 | 0 | 0 | 316 | 14 |

=== International ===
As of match played 24 March 2023

| National team | Year | Apps | Goals |
|---|---|---|---|
Colombia
| Colombia | 2023 | 1 | 0 |
| Colombia | Total | 1 | 0 |

== Honours ==
Uniautónoma

- Categoría Primera B: 2013

Individual

- Süper Lig Team of the Season: 2021–22
