= Hayrullah Bilazer =

Turkish footballer

Personal information
- Date of birth: 20 May 1995 (age 31)
- Place of birth: Trabzon, Turkey
- Height: 1.70 m (5 ft 7 in)
- Position: Right-back

Team information
- Current team: Esenler Erokspor
- Number: 77

Youth career
- 2007–2008: Trabzon Söğütlüspor
- 2008–2014: Akçaabat Sebatspor

Senior career*
Years	Team	Apps	(Gls)
2014–2015	Trabzon Kanuni	1	(0)
2015–2018	Darıca Gençlerbirliği	74	(3)
2018–2020	Boluspor	46	(0)
2020–2023	Giresunspor	86	(3)
2023–2025	Ankaragücü	38	(0)
2025–	Esenler Erokspor	29	(2)
- * Club domestic league appearances and goals as of 5 May 2026

Hayrullah Bilazer (born 20 May 1995) is a Turkish professional footballer who plays as a right-back for TFF 1. Lig club Esenler Erokspor.

== Professional career ==
A youth product of Trabzon Söğütlüspor and Akçaabat Sebatspor, Bilazer began his senior career with Trabzon Kanuni. He had stints with Darıca Gençlerbirliği and Boluspor thereafter. On 19 August 2020, he transferred to Giresunspor and helped them achieve promotion into the Süper Lig. He made his professional debut with Giresunspor in a 2–0 Süper Lig loss to Galatasaray on 16 August 2021.

On June 28, 2023, he signed a 2-year contract with Süper Lig club Ankaragücü.
