= Álvaro de Oliveira =

Emirati footballer

Personal information
- Full name: Álvaro de Oliveira Felicíssimo
- Date of birth: 27 May 2001 (age 25)
- Place of birth: Nova Venécia, Brazil
- Height: 1.71 m (5 ft 7 in)
- Position: Forward

Team information
- Current team: Vanspor
- Number: 9

Youth career
- –2019: América Mineiro
- 2019–2020: Shabab Al Ahli

Senior career*
Years	Team	Apps	(Gls)
2020–2021	Shabab Al Ahli	0	(0)
2020–2021	→ Al-Fujairah (loan)	11	(1)
2021–2023	Dibba Al-Fujairah	24	(5)
2023–2026	Al Bataeh	64	(16)
2026–	Vanspor	8	(2)

International career^{‡}
2025–	United Arab Emirates	3	(0)
- * Club domestic league appearances and goals as of 7 November 2026 ‡ National team caps and goals as of 10 June 2025

Álvaro de Oliveira Felicíssimo (born 27 May 2001), sometimes known as just Álvaro, is a professional footballer who plays for Turkish TFF 1. Lig club Vanspor. Born in Brazil, he plays for the United Arab Emirates national team.

== International Career ==
Born a Brazilian citizen, Alvaro later acquired his Emirati passport in 2025. He made his international debut for the United Arab Emirates in June 2025, coming on as a substitute in the 71st minute against Kyrgyzstan. His appearance subsequently made him permanently tied to the UAE at senior international level.

== Career statistics ==
=== Club ===
As of 28 December 2020.

Club	Season	League			Cup		Continental		Other		Total	
Club	Season	Division	Apps	Goals	Apps	Goals	Apps	Goals	Apps	Goals	Apps	Goals
Shabab Al Ahli	2020–21	UAE Pro League	0	0	0	0	0	0	0	0	0	0
Al-Fujairah (loan)	2020–21	UAE Pro League	11	1	1	0	0	0	0	0	12	1
Career total			11	1	1	0	0	0	0	0	12	1
