= Vanspor F.K. =

Turkish football club

Vanspor FK
- Full name: Vanspor Futbol Kulübü
- Founded: 1982; 44 years ago
- Ground: Van Atatürk Stadı, Van
- Capacity: 5,885
- Coordinates: 38°29′46″N 43°22′23″E
- Chairman: Erol Temel
- Head coach: Mustafa Gürsel
- League: TFF 1. Lig
- 2025–26: TFF 1. Lig, 14th of 20
Home colours	Away colours

Vanspor FK, formerly Van Büyükşehir Belediyespor, is a Turkish professional football club based in Van, a city in eastern Turkey.

== History ==
Van is now represented by Van Büyükşehir Belediyespor (founded in 1982), which gained promotion to the 3rd League (Fourth Level) for the 2006–07 season. Van Belediyespor changed their name to Belediye Vanspor and their colours from blue-white to black-red. This color combination was that of Vanspor's old colours. They promoted to 2nd League by finishing 1st in 1st Group of Third League in 2007–08 season.Following this achievement, the club changed its name to Belediye Vanspor and adopted black and red as their new colors, reflecting the traditional colors of the former top-flight club Vanspor, which had dissolved in 2014.

== Previous names ==
- Belediye Vanspor (1982–2014)
- Van Büyükşehir Belediyespor (2014–2019)
- Vanspor Futbol Kulübü (2019–present)

== League history ==
- TFF First League: 2025–
- TFF Second League: 2008–2011, 2019–2025,
- TFF Third League: 2006–2008, 2011–2019,
- Amatör Futbol Ligleri: 1982–2006

== Current squad ==
As of 15 November 2026

Note: Flags indicate national team as defined under FIFA eligibility rules; some limited exceptions apply. Players may hold more than one non-FIFA nationality.

No.	Pos.	Nation	Player
1	GK	TUR	Alperen Uysal
2	DF	TUR	Kadir Seven (on loan from Zulte Waregem)
3	DF	TUR	Şahan Aslan
5	DF	TUR	Sinan Osmanoğlu
6	MF	TUR	Anıl Yıldırım
7	FW	NED	Ilias Alhaft
8	MF	TTO	Molik Khan
9	FW	UAE	Álvaro de Oliveira
10	MF	AZE	Ozan Kökçü
11	FW	TUR	Mehmet Manış
13	DF	GUI	Naby Oularé
15	FW	NGR	Tenton Yenne (on loan from Baltika Kaliningrad)
17	FW	TUR	İlkan Sever (on loan from Erzurumspor)
19	MF	TUR	Hikmet Çiftçi
22	GK	TUR	Abdulsamed Damlu
25	FW	TUR	Furkan Özhan (on loan from Erzurumspor)
26	DF	TUR	Emre Aytun

No.	Pos.	Nation	Player
27	MF	ALB	Jurgen Bardhi
30	FW	CUW	Richairo Živković
33	GK	TUR	Çınar Tuna Benzer
35	DF	TUR	Batuhan İşçiler
39	GK	TUR	Muhammet Elyesa Çakmak
41	MF	TUR	Mehmet Özcan
46	FW	TUR	Mehmet Can Davarcıoğlu
53	DF	TUR	Güvenç Usta
57	MF	TUR	Abdulsamet Kayman
58	MF	TUR	Özkan Yiğiter
61	DF	TUR	Faruk Can Genç
65	DF	TUR	Medeni Bingöl
77	DF	TUR	Celal Hanalp
80	MF	TUR	Soran Tümen
91	FW	TUR	Boran Yağızer
97	DF	TUR	Engin Taş

=== Out on loan ===
Note: Flags indicate national team as defined under FIFA eligibility rules; some limited exceptions apply. Players may hold more than one non-FIFA nationality.

No.	Pos.	Nation	Player
—	MF	TUR	Yusuf Şengüler (at Karaköprü Belediyespor until 30 June 2027)
