= Onurcan Piri =

Turkish footballer (born 1994)

Personal information
- Date of birth: 28 September 1994 (age 32)
- Place of birth: Giresun, Turkey
- Height: 1.90 m (6 ft 3 in)
- Position: Goalkeeper

Team information
- Current team: Kocaelispor
- Number: 23

Youth career
- 2005: 1957 Espiyespor
- 2005–2013: Giresunspor

Senior career*
Years	Team	Apps	(Gls)
2013–2014	Giresunspor	11	(0)
2014–2015	Bursaspor	0	(0)
2015–2018	Çankaya	41	(0)
2018–2019	Çorum	31	(0)
2019–2020	Bursaspor	0	(0)
2020–2023	Giresunspor	50	(0)
2023–2026	Kayserispor	18	(0)
2026–	Kocaelispor	0	(0)

International career
2012–2013	Turkey U19	15	(0)
2013	Turkey U21	1	(0)
- * Club domestic league appearances and goals as of 18 October 2026

Onurcan Piri (born 28 September 1994), is a Turkish professional footballer who plays as a goalkeeper for Süper Lig club Kocaelispor.

== Professional career ==
A youth product of 1957 Espiyespor and Giresunspor, Piri began his career with Giresunspor's senior team in 2013. On 16 October 2014, he transferred to Bursaspor. He followed that up with stints at Çankaya and Çorum before returning to Bursaspor in 2019. On 19 October 2019, he returned to his first club Giresunspor in the TFF First League. He made his Süper Lig debut with Giresunspor in a 1–0 Süper Lig loss to Alanyaspor on 13 September 2021.

== International career ==
Piri is a youth international for Turkey, having represented the Turkey U19s and U21s.

== Career statistics ==
As of match played 22 November 2025

Appearances and goals by club, season and competition
Club	Season	League			Cup		Total	
Club	Season	Division	Apps	Goals	Apps	Goals	Apps	Goals
Giresunspor	2011–12	TFF 1. Lig	0	0	0	0	0	0
Giresunspor	2012–13	TFF 1. Lig	1	0	1	0	2	0
Giresunspor	2013–14	TFF 1. Lig	10	0	0	0	10	0
Giresunspor	Total		11	0	1	0	12	0
Bursaspor	2013–14	Süper Lig	0	0	0	0	0	0
Bursaspor	2014–15	Süper Lig	0	0	0	0	0	0
Bursaspor	Total		0	0	0	0	0	0
Çankaya	2016–17	TFF 3. Lig	18	0	1	0	19	0
Çankaya	2017–18	TFF 3. Lig	23	0	0	0	23	0
Çankaya	Total		41	0	1	0	42	0
Çorum	2018–19	TFF 3. Lig	31	0	0	0	31	0
Bursaspor	2019–20	TFF 1. Lig	0	0	1	0	1	0
Giresunspor	2019–20	TFF 1. Lig	2	0	—		2	0
Giresunspor	2020–21	TFF 1. Lig	19	0	2	0	21	0
Giresunspor	2021–22	Süper Lig	6	0	2	0	8	0
Giresunspor	2022–23	Süper Lig	23	0	0	0	23	0
Giresunspor	Total		50	0	4	0	54	0
Kayserispor	2023–24	Süper Lig	3	0	3	0	6	0
Kayserispor	2024–25	Süper Lig	11	0	1	0	12	0
Kayserispor	2025–26	Süper Lig	4	0	1	0	5	0
Kayserispor	Total		18	0	5	0	23	0
Career total			151	0	12	0	163	0
