= İrfan Buz =

Turkish football manager (born 1967)

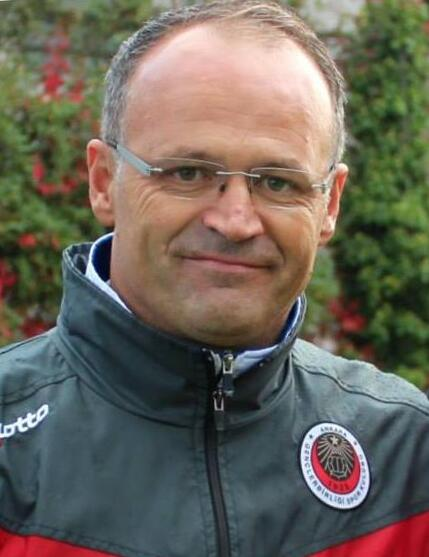
- Buz with Gençlerbirliği in 2014

Personal information
- Date of birth: 15 April 1967 (age 59)
- Place of birth: Istanbul, Turkey
- Position: Midfielder

Youth career
- –1989: Rot-Weiß Lüdenscheid

Senior career*
Years	Team	Apps	(Gls)
1989	Rot-Weiß Lüdenscheid		
1989–1992	Sarıyer	1	(0)
1991–1992	→ Vanspor (loan)	18	(2)
1992–1995	Sakaryaspor	22	(1)
1993–1994	→ Istanbul Maltepespor (loan)	15	(1)
1995–1998	Barışspor Hackenberg		

Managerial career
- 1995–1998: Barışspor Hackenberg
- 1998–2008: Germany U11-U19
- 2009–2013: SpVg Olpe
- 2013: Iserlohn 46/49
- 2014: Bursaspor
- 2014–2015: Gençlerbirliği
- 2015–2017: Yeni Malatyaspor
- 2017–2018: Osmanlıspor
- 2019: Samsunspor
- 2020: Bursaspor
- 2020: Kasımpaşa
- 2021: Yeni Malatyaspor
- 2023: Giresunspor
- 2023–2024: Şanlıurfaspor
- 2024–2025: Velež Mostar
- 2025: Sakaryaspor
- * Club domestic league appearances and goals

İrfan Buz (born 15 April 1967) is a Turkish professional football manager and former player.

== Early life ==
Buz moved to Germany in 1971 with his family, and graduated as a construction technician from the Technical University of Dortmund.

== Playing career ==
Buz began playing amateur football with Rot-Weiß Lüdenscheid, before playing professional in Turkey. Buz joined Sarıyer S.K. in the Süper Lig in 1989, but only made one appearance over two years.

== Managerial career ==
After his footballing career, Buz began working as a football manager. He transitioned as player-manager for the amateur German club Barışspor Hackenberg. From 1999 to 2008, he served a youth coach for the German Football Association. He managed the German club SpVg Olpe from 2009 to 2013 and got attention from the Turkish Süper Lig. In 2013, he briefly joined FC Iserlohn 46/49 before moving to Bursaspor.

Buz was appointed manager of Bursaspor on 26 March 2014. He then went to manage Gençlerbirliği. He then spent a couple years at Yeni Malatyaspor, who he helped promoted to the Süper Lig in the 2016–17 season. In September 2017, he became the manager of Osmanlıspor, who were relegated at the end of the season.
