= Vukan Savićević =

Montenegrin footballer (born 1994)

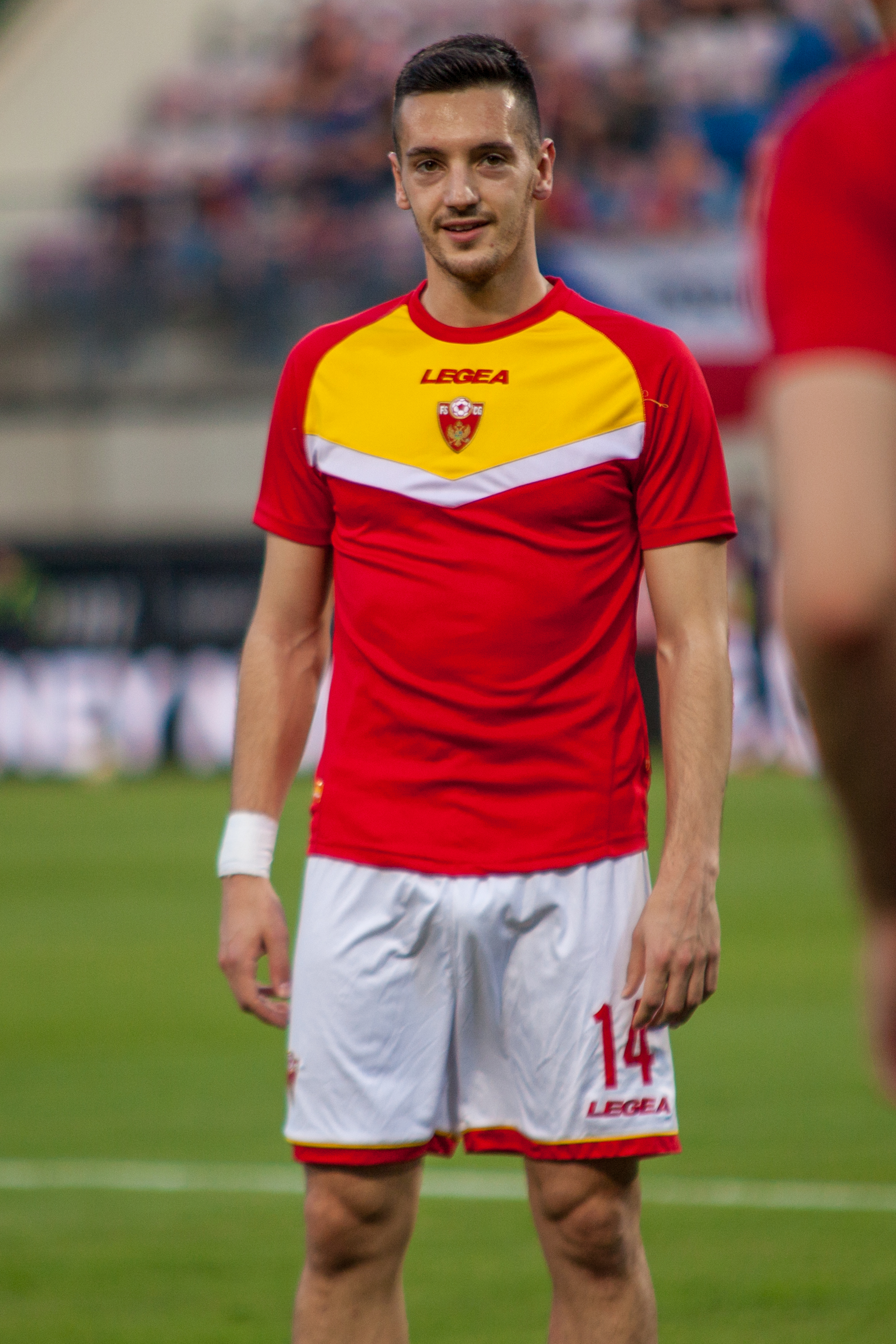
- Savićević in 2019

Personal information
- Full name: Vukan Savićević
- Date of birth: 29 January 1994 (age 32)
- Place of birth: Belgrade, FR Yugoslavia
- Height: 1.79 m (5 ft 10 1/2 in)
- Position: Midfielder

Team information
- Current team: Buriram United
- Number: 18

Youth career
- Red Star Belgrade

Senior career*
Years	Team	Apps	(Gls)
2012–2015	Red Star Belgrade	40	(4)
2015–2018	Slovan Bratislava	82	(7)
2019–2020	Wisła Kraków	34	(6)
2020–2022	Samsunspor	46	(5)
2022–2024	Giresunspor	39	(2)
2024–2026	Vojvodina	76	(5)
2026–	Buriram United	0	(0)

International career
2009–2010	Montenegro U17	1	(0)
2012–2013	Serbia U19	3	(0)
2015–2017	Montenegro U21	5	(3)
2017–2024	Montenegro	20	(0)
- * Club domestic league appearances and goals as of 12 June 2026

Vukan Savićević (Serbian Cyrillic: Вукан Савићевић, pronounced [ʋǔkan saʋǐːtʃeʋitɕ]; born 29 January 1994) is a Montenegrin professional footballer who plays as a midfielder for Thai League 1 club Buriram United.

== Club career ==
=== Red Star Belgrade ===
Savićević became a senior-team player aged 17. Coach Aleksandar Janković decided to promote Savićević to the senior team at the beginning of the 2012–13 season, and Savićević made his professional debut on 22 September 2012 versus Hajduk Kula. He scored his first professional goal for Red Star in a 2–1 win against FK Javor Ivanjica on 22 February 2013. On 21 June 2013, Savićević signed a new four-year contract with Red Star which lasts until 2017.

=== Slovan Bratislava ===
On 7 August 2015 Savićević pardoned Red Star Belgrade for €120,000 in unpaid salaries and signed with Slovan Bratislava.

== International career ==
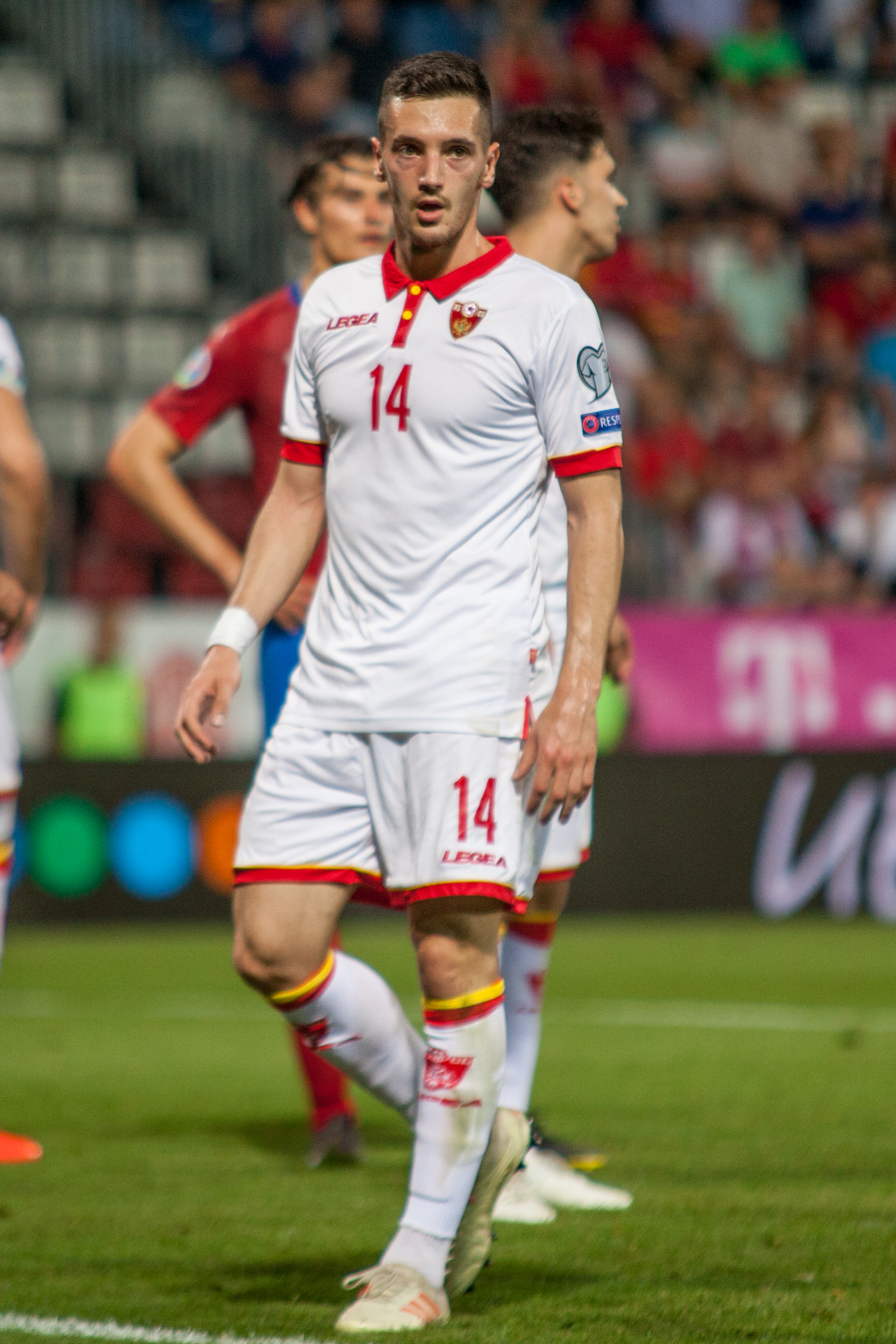
Savićević in action for Montenegro in 2019

Initially, Savićević represented Montenegro on international level, having been part of the U-17 squad during 2009 and 2010. However, in 2012 he became member of the Serbian U-19 team.

He debuted for Montenegrin U21 team on 15 June 2015 in a qualifying match against Moldova, in which he scored the winning goal (Montenegro won 1–0).

Savićević was called up to the senior Montenegro squad for a friendly against Turkey in June 2016.

He did his debut for the senior national team on 4 June 2017 in a 2–1 friendly loss against Iran.

== Career statistics ==
As of 17 May 2026

Appearances and goals by club, season and competition
Club	Season	League			National cup (Note: Includes Serbian Cup, Slovak Cup, Polish Cup, Turkish Cup)		Continental		Other		Total	
Club	Season	Division	Apps	Goals	Apps	Goals	Apps	Goals	Apps	Goals	Apps	Goals
Red Star Belgrade	2012–13	Serbian SuperLiga	10	1	2	0	0	0	—		12	1
Red Star Belgrade	2013–14	Serbian SuperLiga	17	0	2	0	4 (Note: Appearances in UEFA Europa League)	1	—		23	1
Red Star Belgrade	2014–15	Serbian SuperLiga	10	1	1	0	0	0	—		11	1
Red Star Belgrade	2015–16	Serbian SuperLiga	3	2	0	0	2	1	—		5	3
Red Star Belgrade	Total		40	4	5	0	6	2	—		51	6
Slovan Bratislava	2015–16	Slovak First League	20	2	6	0	—		—		26	2
Slovan Bratislava	2016–17	Slovak First League	23	1	4	1	3	0	1 (Note: Appearance in Czech-Slovak Supercup)	0	31	2
Slovan Bratislava	2017–18	Slovak First League	23	3	6	2	4	1	—		33	6
Slovan Bratislava	2018–19	Slovak First League	16	1	0	0	6	1	—		22	2
Slovan Bratislava	Total		82	7	16	3	13	2	1	0	112	12
Wisła Kraków	2018–19	Ekstraklasa	12	2	0	0	—		—		12	2
Wisła Kraków	2019–20	Ekstraklasa	22	4	1	0	—		—		23	4
Wisła Kraków	Total		34	6	1	0	—		—		35	6
Samsunspor	2020–21	TFF 1. Lig	29	3	1	0	—		—		30	3
Samsunspor	2021–22	TFF 1. Lig	17	2	1	0	—		—		18	2
Samsunspor	Total		46	5	2	0	—		—		48	5
Giresunspor	2022–23	Süper Lig	26	1	3	2	—		—		29	3
Giresunspor	2023–24	TFF 1. Lig	13	1	1	1	—		—		14	2
Giresunspor	Total		39	2	4	3	—		—		43	5
Vojvodina	2023–24	Serbian SuperLiga	16	1	3	1	—		—		19	2
Vojvodina	2024–25	Serbian SuperLiga	27	1	5	0	4 (Note: Two appearances in UEFA Europa League, two appearances in UEFA Conference League)	0	—		36	1
Vojvodina	2025–26	Serbian SuperLiga	33	3	2	0	—		—		36	3
Vojvodina	Total		76	5	11	1	4	0	—		91	6
Buriram United	2026–27	Thai League 1	0	0	0	0	0	0	0	0	0	0
Career total			310	28	39	7	23	4	1	0	373	39

=== International ===
Appearances and goals by national team and year
National team	Year	Apps	Goals
Montenegro
Montenegro	2017	1	0
Montenegro	2018	0	0
Montenegro	2019	3	0
Montenegro	2020	2	0
Montenegro	2021	2	0
Montenegro	2022	6	0
Montenegro	2023	5	0
Montenegro	2024	1	0
Total		20	0

== Honours ==
Red Star

- Serbian SuperLiga: 2013–14
