= Robert Mejía =

Colombian footballer (born 2000)

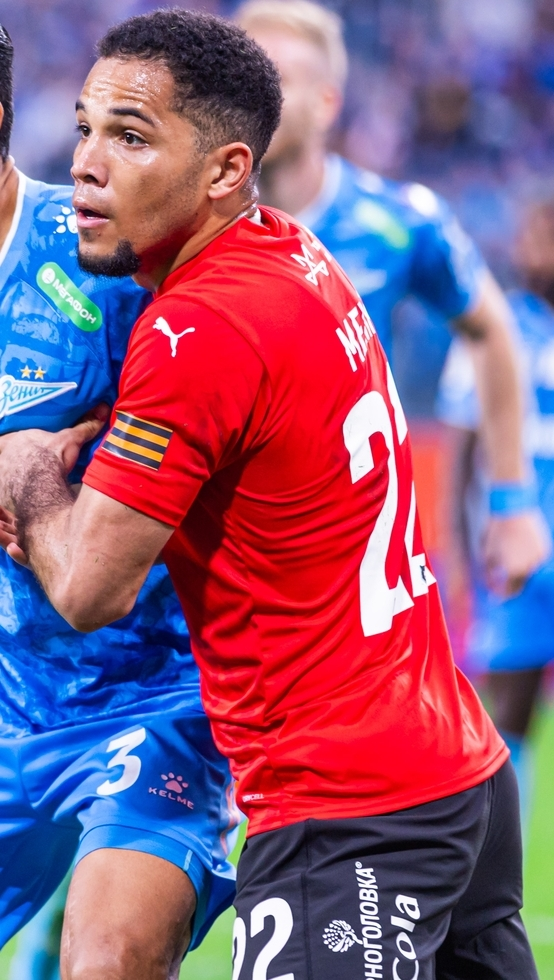

Personal information
- Full name: Robert Andrés Mejía Navarrete
- Date of birth: 6 October 2000 (age 26)
- Place of birth: Puerto Tejada, Colombia
- Height: 1.73 m (5 ft 8 in)
- Position: Midfielder

Team information
- Current team: Orenburg
- Number: 14

Youth career
- –2015: Deportes Quindío

Senior career*
Years	Team	Apps	(Gls)
2016–2018	Boca Juniors de Cali	46	(0)
2019	Universitario Popayán	2	(0)
2019–2026	Once Caldas	101	(4)
2022–2023	→ Giresunspor (loan)	29	(1)
2023–2024	→ Atlético Nacional (loan)	38	(2)
2024–2025	→ Khimki (loan)	20	(0)
2026–	Orenburg	1	(0)

International career^{‡}
2017	Colombia U17	13	(0)
- * Club domestic league appearances and goals as of 17 September 2026 ‡ National team caps and goals as of 2 June 2020

Robert Andrés Mejía Navarrete (born 6 October 2000) is a Colombian footballer who plays as a midfielder for Russian club Orenburg.

== Club career ==
On 14 July 2026, Mejía returned to the Russian Premier League and signed with Orenburg.

== Career statistics ==
=== Club ===
As of 24 May 2025

Club	Division	Season	League		Cup		Continental		Total	
Club	Division	Season	Apps	Goals	Apps	Goals	Apps	Goals	Apps	Goals
Boca Juniors de Cali	Categoría Primera B	2016	20	0	4	0	-	-	24	0
Boca Juniors de Cali	Categoría Primera B	2017	9	0	2	0	-	-	11	0
Boca Juniors de Cali	Categoría Primera B	2018	17	0	0	0	-	-	17	0
Boca Juniors de Cali	Total		46	0	6	0	0	0	52	0
Once Caldas	Categoría Primera A	2020	17	1	2	0	-	-	19	1
Once Caldas	Categoría Primera A	2021	33	1	0	0	-	-	33	1
Once Caldas	Categoría Primera A	2022	17	1	4	0	-	-	21	1
Once Caldas	Categoría Primera A	2024	6	0	-	-	-	-	6	0
Once Caldas	Total		73	3	6	0	0	0	79	3
Giresunspor	Süper Lig	2022-23	29	1	4	0	-	-	33	1
Atlético Nacional	Categoría Primera A	2023	21	0	7	1	-	-	28	1
Atlético Nacional	Categoría Primera A	2024	17	2	0	0	2	0	19	2
Atlético Nacional	Total		38	2	7	1	2	0	47	3
Khimki	Russian Premier League	2024–25	20	0	1	0	-	-	21	0
Career total			206	6	24	1	2	0	232	7

== Honours ==
Atlético Nacional

- Copa Colombia: 2023
