= Erdal Güneş =

Turkish football coach and former player

Personal information
- Date of birth: 29 May 1982 (age 44)
- Place of birth: Eruh, Türkiye
- Height: 1.84 m (6 ft 0 in)
- Position: Winger

Youth career
- 1997–2000: Gaziantep FK

Senior career*
Years	Team	Apps	(Gls)
2000	Gaziantepspor	0	(0)
2000	Gaziantep FK	2	(0)
2000–2001	Gaskispor	10	(2)
2001–2002	Gaziantep FK	26	(7)
2002–2006	Gaziantepspor	116	(11)
2007–2008	Kayserispor	13	(0)
2008	Gaziantepspor	10	(0)
2008–2009	Altay	30	(2)
2009–2010	Diyarbakırspor	18	(0)
2010–2011	Mersin İdman Yurdu	26	(2)
2011–2014	Altay	4	(0)
2014–2017	Gaziantep FK	84	(5)

International career^{‡}
1999–2000	Turkey U17	3	(0)
2003	Turkey U21	4	(0)
2005	Turkey B	1	(0)

Managerial career
- 2022–2023: Gaziantep FK
- 2024: Turkey U15
- 2025: Turkey U20
- 2026: Boluspor
- * Club domestic league appearances and goals as of 09:15, 2 February 2026 (UTC) ‡ National team caps and goals as of 09:15, 2 February 2026 (UTC)

Erdal Güneş (born 29 May 1982) is a Turkish football coach and former player.

== Professional career ==
Güneş is a youth product of Gaziantepspor, and signed his first professional contract with them in 2000. He spent his early career with Gaziantep-based clubs Gaziantepspor, and their affiliates at the time Gaziantep FK and Gaskispor. In 2007 he briefly moved to Kayserispor, followed with a first stint at Altay, Diyarbakırspor, Mersin İdman Yurdu, and a second stint at Altay. He returned to Gaziantep FK in 2014, and ended his career with them in 2017.

== International career ==
Güneş is a youth international for Turkey, having played for the Turkey U17s, Turkey U21 and Turkey B national team.

== Managerial career ==
Güneş was named the assistant manager at Gaziantep FK in 2017, immediately after his playing career. He was named the interim manager for the club on 27 January 2023 with 2 wins in 3 matches, before the 2023 Turkey–Syria earthquake caused the club to withdraw from the league for the rest of the season. He was officially named manager of Gaziantep FK on 24 May 2023, signing a 2-year contract.

== Honours ==
Mersin İdman Yurdu

- TFF First League: 2010–11
