= Gaziantepspor =

Turkish football club in Gaziantep

- Full name: Gaziantepspor
- Nickname: Şahinler (The Falcons)
- Founded: 25 February 1969; 57 years ago
- Dissolved: 31 July 2020; 6 years ago
- Stadium: Gaziantep Stadium

Gaziantepspor was a Turkish football club located in the city of Gaziantep. Formed in 1969 and dissolved in 2020, Gaziantepspor were nicknamed the Şahinler (The Falcons). The club colours were black and red, and they played their home matches at New Gaziantep Stadium.

== History ==
The first sports club in Gaziantep was founded by students at the American College in 1923. Several other clubs were founded soon after; Altınışık, Kilis İdman Yurdu Spor Kulübü, and Türkocağı Spor Kulübü. However, these clubs did not last long, with Altınışık and Türkocağı folding in 1929 and 1931 respectively. Türkocağı went on to merge with Sanatkarlar Spor Kulübü to form Gaziantep İdman Yurdu. The club did not register in time for the Gaziantep amateur league and were only permitted to compete in friendly matches. Gaziantep Idman Yurdu disbanded in 1932. There were no clubs in Gaziantep until 1938, with the sports branch of the community centre taking over and running all sporting activities.

Gaziantepspor, which bears the name of Gaziantep city, was founded in the first days of 1969. Gaziantep city's leading people held a meeting under the chairmanship of Mayor Abdulkadir Batur and they made a first attempt for the foundation of the club.

Later on, as a result of continuing meetings, Gaziantepspor Club was founded in 1969. Important figures in Gaziantep held a meeting with then-mayor Abdülkadir Batur in order to form the club. A total of 58 people helped with the foundation of Gaziantepspor in 1969. Besir Bayram who was a founder member, was a first president. The club contested friendly matches in their first season. They were allowed to join the TFF Third League in 1970. Gaziantepspor, activities.

Gaziantepspor finished its first season by playing friendly matches. The red–blacks started to play in the Turkish League in 1970–71 season through a decree executed in 1970 which allowed city teams play directly in the third division. In their first season of professional football, Gaziantepspor finished third in the 3.Lig, Yeşil Grup (Green Group).

The club finished second in the 2.Lig in 1974–75, barely missing promotion by three points. Gaziantepspor were promoted to the top-flight after the 1978–79 season. The club managed to stay afloat in their first season in the 1.Lig, finishing one point above the relegation zone. The club was relegated in 1983, but earned promotion back to the top-flight in 1990, where they competed until 2017. The club had a best position in the top-flight of 3rd in the 1999–2000 and 2000–01 seasons. In the 2016–17 season, Gaziantepspor was relegated from the Super Lig. In the 2017–18 season, they were relegated from the 1.Lig.

Gaziantepspor, who competed in Group White of 2018–19 TFF Second League, announced that they withdrew from the league in January 2019 after receiving a 36 points deduction. They announced that they would resume the fight in the Turkish Regional Amateur League in the 2019–20 season. In 2019, FIFA issued a 21-point deduction penalty to red-blacks for debt to their former players. However, since the creditors of the former players were not paid in the 2019–20 season, the club withdrew in the Amateur League with -15 points and finished the league in the last place and went bankrupt and closed its activities. August 2024 new association founded 1969Gaziantep SK

== Crest and colours ==
The club colours are red and black. The colours were chosen as a dedication to the martyrs who gave up their lives to defend Gaziantep; black for the martyrs, and red for the martyrs blood.

Gaziantepspor's crest represents the city's landmarks and was designed under the guidance of ex-chairman Celal Doğan. Gaziantep castle is symbolized by the outline of the logo. Above the Gaziantep banner lies the martyr's memorial, the checkered background represents the cities treat to the world, the famous dessert ‘Baklava’. In the foreground is a şahin (hawk/falcon in Turkish) which is the club's nickname as well as the name of one of the city's heroes Şahin Bey.

== Stadium ==
Gaziantepspor played their home matches at Gaziantep Kamil Ocak Stadium. The stadium is named after former politician Kamil Ocak (1914–69), who was a member of parliament and a minister of state responsible for sports between 1965 and 1969; he helped build sporting facilities in Gaziantep. The stadium was opened in 1974 and it currently seats 16,981 spectators. The field is covered with grass, and the stadium also has floodlights.

== Support ==
The club enjoyed most of their support from the city and surrounding provinces. Their main ultra group was called Gençlik 27, meaning the Youth 27, as number 27 corresponds to the province's code. Gençlik 27 was founded in 1996 by Hasan Günoğlu also known as Hasan Reis (Reis meaning Boss). The supporter group were renowned for creating a great atmosphere at home games with their red flares flags and were found in the 5th and 6th stands behind the goal. Gaziantepspor fans were also known for being proud of their Anatolian heritage, playing national Turku Anadolu music, causing trouble, causing fights, violence and much crowd trouble was reported at games, which is caused by every fan and club in Turkish football as it is more than religion for the Turkish population.

== Honours ==
=== Domestic ===
- Turkish Süper Lig
  - Third place: 1999–00, 2000–01
  - Fourth place: 1980–81, 2002–03, 2003–04, 2010–11
- TFF 1. Lig
  - Winners: 1978–79, 1989–90
- TFF Third League
  - Winners: 1971–72

=== Cup ===
- Spor Toto Cup
  - Winners: 2011–12
- TSYD Cup (Ankara)
  - Winners: 1990
- TSYD Cup (Adana)
  - Winners: 1979, 1990, 1991, 1996
- Gençlik ve Spor Bakanlığı Cup
  - Winners: 1978–79

== Domestic leagues record ==
=== Leagues participation ===
- Turkish Super League: 1979–83, 1990–2017
- TFF First League: 1972–79, 1983–90, 2017–18
- TFF Second League: 1970–72, 2018–19
- Turkish Regional Amateur League: 2019–20

=== Recent seasons ===
Season	Div.	Pos.	Pl.	W	D	L	GS	GA	P	Cup	Manager
2005–06	SL	11	34	10	10	14	34	50	40	SF	(Italy) Walter Zenga
2006–07	SL	11	34	11	10	13	31	39	43	QF	(Turkey) Samet Aybaba
2007–08	SL	9	34	11	10	13	36	45	43		(Turkey) Erdoğan Arıca / (Turkey) Mesut Bakkal
2008–09	SL	8	34	12	11	11	46	48	47		(Turkey) Nurullah Sağlam
2009–10	SL	13	34	9	13	12	38	39	40		(Portugal) José Couceiro
2010–11	SL	4	34	17	8	9	44	33	59	SF	(Turkey) Tolunay Kafkas
2011–12	SL	10	34	13	9	12	39	33	48		(Turkey) Abdullah Ercan / (Turkey) Hikmet Karaman
2012–13	SL	10	34	12	10	12	42	49	46		(Turkey) Hikmet Karaman / (Turkey) Bülent Uygun
2013–14	SL	15	34	10	7	17	38	58	37		(Turkey) Bülent Uygun / (Turkey) Sergen Yalçın / (Turkey) Tahsin Tam
2014–15	SL	10	34	11	7	16	31	48	40		(Turkey) Okan Buruk
2015–16	SL	14	34	9	9	16	31	50	36		
2016–17	SL	17	34	7	5	22	30	65	26		Relegated
2017–18	1L	18	34	2	4	28	18	100	1		Relegated
2018–19	2L	18	34	3	2	29	11	92	-34		Relegated
2019–20	Reg.	14	21	3	0	18	16	64	-15		Dissolved

== Continental competitions record ==
As of 4 August 2011

Competition	Pld	W	D	L	GF	GA	GD
UEFA Cup / UEFA Europa League	16	6	6	4	22	13	+9
UEFA Intertoto Cup	4	1	2	1	4	4	0
Total	20	7	8	5	25	17	+9

UEFA Cup / UEFA Europa League:

Season	Round	Club	Home	Away	Aggregate
2000–01	1R	(Spain) Deportivo Alavés	3–4	0–0	3–4
2001–02	QR	(Moldova) Zimbru Chișinău	4–1	0–0	4–1
2001–02	1R	(Israel) Hapoel Tel Aviv	1–1	0–1	1–2
2003–04	1R	(Israel) Hapoel Tel Aviv	1–0	0–0	1–0
2003–04	2R	(France) Lens	3–0	3–1	6–1
2003–04	3R	(Italy) Roma	1–0	0–2	1–2
2011–12	Q2	(Belarus) Minsk	4–1	1–1	6–2
2011–12	Q3	(Poland) Legia Warsaw	0–1	0–0	0–1

UEFA Intertoto Cup:

Season	Round	Club	Home	Away	Aggregate
1996	Group 10	(Belgium) Lierse	—N/a	0–1	4th
1996	Group 10	(Hungary) Vasas	3–2	—N/a	4th
1996	Group 10	(Netherlands) Groningen	—N/a	1–1	4th
1996	Group 10	(Estonia) Trans Narva	0–0	—N/a	4th

UEFA Ranking history:

As of 2016

Season	Rank	Points	Ref.
2001	139 ▲	15.987	
2002	143 ▼	16.362	
2003	152 ▼	16.495	
2004	95 ▲	21.656	
2005	109 ▼	20.872	
2006	129 ▼	18.634	
2007	122 ▲	17.791	
2008	113 ▲	19.469	
2012	175 ▲	7.810	
2013	178 ▼	7.900	
2014	199 ▼	7.840	
2015	208 ▼	7.520	
2016	194 ▲	7.920	

== Team records ==
=== All-time top scorers ===
Rank	Player	Apps	Years	Goal
1	(Turkey) Hasan Çelik	160	1988–96	56
2	(Turkey) Hasan Özer	160	1992–05	53
3	(Turkey) Cenk Tosun	130	2010–14	51
4	(Bosnia and Herzegovina) Elvir Bolić	75	1992–95	45
5	(Bulgaria) Zdravko Lazarov	103	2003–06	41
6	(Turkey) Fatih Tekke	67	2000–03	31
7	(Turkey) Ayhan Akman	112	1994–98	26
8	(Turkey) Hüseyin Çakıroğlu	128	1979–84	26
8	(Brazil) Beto	82	2007–11	25
8	(Turkey) Oktay Derelioğlu	31	1999–00	25
9	(Belarus) Maksim Romaschenko	68	2000–03	24
10	(Turkey) Erdal Güneş	137	1999–08	24
