= Erol Can Akdağ =

Turkish footballer

Personal information
- Date of birth: 18 August 1996 (age 30)
- Place of birth: Giresun, Turkey
- Height: 1.74 m (5 ft 9 in)
- Position: Defensive midfielder

Senior career*
Years	Team	Apps	(Gls)
2017–2024	Giresunspor	50	(1)
2018–2019	→ Çankaya (loan)	49	(5)
2019–2020	→ Ağrı 1970 (loan)	22	(5)
2022–2023	→ Tuzlaspor (loan)	27	(1)
2024–2025	24 Erzincanspor	26	(2)
2025–2026	Mardin 1969	17	(0)
- * Club domestic league appearances and goals as of 19 October 2026

Erol Can Akdağ (born 18 August 1996) is a Turkish professional footballer who plays as a defensive midfielder.

== Career ==
A youth product of Giresunspor, Akdağ signed his first professional contract with the club in 2015 and began his senior career with successive loans to Çankaya and Ağrı 1970. He returned to Giresunspor for the 2020-21 season in the TFF First League. He made his professional debut for Giresunspor in a 2–1 Süper Lig loss to Fenerbahçe on 23 September 2021.
