= Faruk Can Genç =

Turkish footballer (born 2000)

Personal information
- Date of birth: 16 February 2000 (age 26)
- Place of birth: Trabzon, Turkey
- Height: 1.80 m (5 ft 11 in)
- Position: Left-back

Team information
- Current team: Vanspor
- Number: 61

Youth career
- 2013–2019: Trabzonspor

Senior career*
Years	Team	Apps	(Gls)
2019–2022	Trabzonspor	1	(0)
2021–2022	→ Ümraniyespor (loan)	14	(0)
2022	→ Ankara Keçiörengücü (loan)	0	(0)
2022–2024	Giresunspor	44	(2)
2024–2025	Bandırmaspor	34	(1)
2025–	Vanspor	9	(0)

International career^{‡}
2018	Turkey U18	4	(0)
- * Club domestic league appearances and goals as of 6 May 2026 ‡ National team caps and goals as of 19 February 2021

Faruk Can Genç (born 16 February 2000) is a Turkish professional footballer who plays as a defender for TFF 1. Lig club Vanspor.

== Career ==
A youth product of Trabzonspor since the age of 13, Genç signed a professional contract with them in 2019. He made his professional debut for Trabzonspor in a 1–0 Süper Lig win over Başakşehir on 19 February 2021. On 7 September 2021 he joined Ümraniyespor on a season long loan. On 16 August 2022, he moved to Ankara Keçiörengücü on a season long loan.

His loan was cut short and on 9 September 2022, Genç signed with Giresunspor.

On 13 November 2025, Genç was banned from playing for 3 months for his involvement in the 2025 Turkish football betting scandal.

== International career ==
Genç is a youth international for Turkiye, having played for the Turkey U18s in 2018.
