= Talha Ülvan =

Turkish footballer (born 2001)

Personal information
- Date of birth: 20 April 2001 (age 25)
- Place of birth: Hasselt, Belgium
- Height: 1.81 m (5 ft 11 in)
- Position: Right-back

Team information
- Current team: Eyüpspor
- Number: 17

Youth career
- Oud-Heverlee Leuven

Senior career*
Years	Team	Apps	(Gls)
2022	Samsunspor	1	(0)
2022–2024	Giresunspor	35	(1)
2024–2025	Fatih Karagümrük	16	(1)
2025–	Eyüpspor	20	(2)

International career^{‡}
2020	Turkey U19	1	(0)
- * Club domestic league appearances and goals as of 10 June 2026 ‡ National team caps and goals as of 19:49, 12 August 2022 (UTC)

Talha Ülvan (born 20 April 2001) is a footballer who plays as a right-back for Süper Lig club Eyüpspor. Born in Belgium, he is a former youth international for Turkey.

== Professional career ==
A youth product of the Belgian club Oud-Heverlee Leuven, Ülvan transferred to the TFF First League club Samsunspor on 8 January 2022. On 5 August 2022 after making a single senior appearance with Samsunspor, he transferred to the Turkish Süper Lig club Giresunspor. He made his professional debut win a 3–2 Süper Lig loss to Adana Demirspor on 7 August 2022.

== Personal life ==
Born in Belgium, Ülvan is of Turkish descent. He is a youth international for Turkey, having played for the Turkey U19s.
