= Kadir Seven =

Turkish footballer

Personal information
- Date of birth: 5 May 2003 (age 23)
- Place of birth: Karabük, Turkey
- Height: 1.84 m (6 ft 0 in)
- Position: Centre-back

Team information
- Current team: Vanspor (on loan from Zulte Waregem)
- Number: 2

Youth career
- 2015–2020: Kardemir Karabükspor
- 2020–2021: 5000 Evlerspor

Senior career*
Years	Team	Apps	(Gls)
2021–2022	Orduspor 1967	31	(3)
2022–2024	Giresunspor	41	(0)
2024–2026	Çorum	23	(2)
2026–	Zulte Waregem	0	(0)
2026–	Jong Essevee	3	(0)
2026–	→ Vanspor (loan)	3	(0)
- * Club domestic league appearances and goals as of 20 September 2026

Kadir Seven (born 5 May 2003) is a Turkish professional footballer who plays as a centre-back for TFF 1. Lig club Vanspor on loan from Belgian club Zulte Waregem.

== Professional career ==
A youth product of Kardemir Karabükspor and 5000 Evlerspor, Seven began his senior career in amateur football with Orduspor 1967 in 2021 helping them get promoted into the TFF Third League, and quickly gained attention for his play. On 1 July 2022, he transferred to Giresunspor. He made his senior and professional debut with Giresunspor as a late substitute in a 1–0 Süper Lig win over Kasımpaşa on 20 August 2022.

On 13 November 2025, Seven was banned from playing for 45 days for his involvement in the 2025 Turkish football betting scandal.

On 22 January 2026, he signed with Zulte Waregem in Belgium. After only appearing for their reserves in the Belgian fourth tier, in September 2026 Seven returned to Turkey, joining Vanspor on loan.
