= Mert Kurt =

Belgian footballer

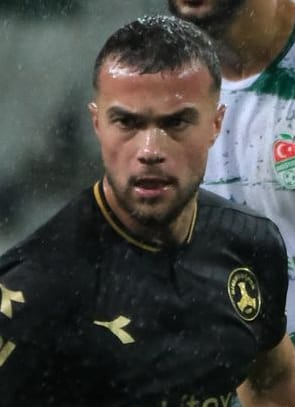
- Kurt in 2022

Personal information
- Full name: Mert Han Kurt
- Date of birth: 25 October 2002 (age 24)
- Place of birth: Ghent, Belgium
- Height: 1.80 m (5 ft 11 in)
- Position: Forward

Team information
- Current team: Giresunspor
- Number: 75

Youth career
- Cercle Brugge

Senior career*
Years	Team	Apps	(Gls)
2022–	Giresunspor	5	(0)
- * Club domestic league appearances and goals as of 22 May 2023

Mert Han Kurt (born 25 October 2002) is a Belgian footballer who plays as a forward for Turkish club Giresunspor.

== Professional career ==
=== Early years ===
Born in Ghent, Belgium, Kurt started his career in the youth academy of Cercle Brugge.

=== Giresunspor ===
On 29 June 2022, he transferred to the Turkish Süper Lig club Giresunspor as a professional football player. He made his professional debut with a 3–2 league loss to Adana Demirspor on 7 August, coming in as a substitute in the 86th minute. He assisted the second goal in the 90+1 minute.

== Personal life ==
Kurt was born and raised in Ghent, Belgium. He has Turkish descent.

== Career statistics ==
: As of match played 22 May 2023[1]

Appearances and goals by club, season and competition
Club	Season	League			National Cup (Note: Includes Turkish Cup)		Continental		Total	
Club	Season	Division	Apps	Goals	Apps	Goals	Apps	Goals	Apps	Goals
Giresunspor	2022–23	Süper Lig	5	0	2	0	–		7	0
Career total			5	0	2	0	0	0	7	0
