= Faustin Senghor =

Senegalese footballer

Personal information
- Date of birth: 2 January 1994 (age 32)
- Place of birth: Bignona, Senegal
- Height: 1.83 m (6 ft 0 in)
- Position: Centre-back

Team information
- Current team: Vardar
- Number: 75

Youth career
- Casa Sports

Senior career*
Years	Team	Apps	(Gls)
2014–2018	Casa Sports		
2018–2019	Čelik Zenica	6	(0)
2019–2021	Casa Sports		
2021–2022	Shkupi	46	(4)
2022–2024	Giresunspor	5	(0)
2025–	Vardar	25	(1)
- * Club domestic league appearances and goals as of 30 November 2025

Faustin Senghor (born 2 January 1994) is a Senegalese professional footballer who plays as a centre-back for Macedonian First Football League club Vardar.

== Professional career ==
Senghor began his professional career in his native Senegal with Casa Sports. He moved to the Bosnian club Čelik Zenica in 2018 where he made a handful of appearances. He returned to Casa Sports in 2019, and after a couple of seasons helped them win the Senegal FA Cup and Senegalese League Cup. On 29 January 2021, he moved to the Macedonian club Shkupi signing a 2-year contract. After helping Shkupi win the Macedonian First Football League, he transferred to the Turkish club Giresunspor on 6 September 2022.

== Honours ==
Casa Sports

- Senegal FA Cup: 2021
- Senegalese League Cup: 2021

Shkupi

- Macedonian First Football League: 2021–22
