= Çotanak Sports Complex =

Football stadium in Giresun, Turkey

- Çotanak Stadyumu
- Interactive map of Çotanak Sports Complex
- Full name: Çotanak Spor Kompleksi
- Location: Giresun, Turkey
- Coordinates: 40°53′21″N 38°26′21″E
- Owner: Ministry of Youth and Sports (Turkey)
- Operator: Giresunspor
- Capacity: 21,500
- Executive suites: 49
- Surface: Grass
- Record attendance: 15,530 (Giresunspor vs Beşiktaş, 17 April 2022)

Construction
- Groundbreaking: 11 November 2016
- Built: 2016–2021
- Opened: 24 January 2021
- Cost: ₺2 billion
- Architect: Bora Soykut
- General contractor: Siyahkalem Mühendislik İnşaat Sanayi ve Ticaret A.Ş.

Tenant
- Giresunspor (2021–present)

The Çotanak Sports Complex (Turkish: Çotanak Spor Kompleksi) is a stadium in Giresun, Turkey. It has a capacity of approximately 21,500 spectators, after initially being planned for 22,028. It is the new home of Giresunspor, currently playing in the Turkish Süper Lig. It has replaced the club's former home, Giresun Atatürk Stadium. Next to the stadium, there is an olympic swimming pool with a capacity of 1,000 spectators and a training ground.
