= Fatih Yılmaz (footballer, born 2002) =

Turkish footballer

Personal information
- Date of birth: 19 May 2002 (age 24)
- Place of birth: Giresun, Turkey
- Height: 1.88 m (6 ft 2 in)
- Position: Centre-back

Team information
- Current team: Giresunspor
- Number: 4

Youth career
- 2013–2020: Giresunspor

Senior career*
Years	Team	Apps	(Gls)
2020–	Giresunspor	2	(0)
2023	→ Osmaniyespor (loan)	3	(0)
- * Club domestic league appearances and goals as of 17 September 2023

Fatih Yılmaz (born 19 May 2002) is a Turkish footballer who plays as a centre-back for Giresunspor.

== Career ==
Yılmaz is a youth product of Giresunspor, and joined their senior team in 2020. On 13 September 2020, he signed his first professional contract with the club. He made his professional debut with Giresunspor in a 2–1 Turkish Cup loss to Antalyaspor on 28 December 2021.

== International career ==
Yılmaz was called up to a training camp for the Turkey U21s in January 2022.
