= Giresunspor =

Association football club in Turkey

- Full name: Giresun Spor Kulübü
- Nickname: Çotanaklar
- Founded: 1967; 59 years ago
- Ground: Çotanak Sports Complex, Giresun
- Capacity: 21,166
- Chairman: Emin Eltuğral
- Manager: Adil Tozlu
- Website: www.giresunspor.com.tr
Home colours	Away colours	Third colours

Giresunspor Kulübü is a Turkish professional football club based in Giresun.

== History ==
Giresunspor was founded in 1925 and re-formed in 1967 after the merger of Yeşiltepespor, Akıngençlikspor, and Beşiktaşspor. The football club is playing in the 2. Lig. The Çotanaklar played in the Turkish Super League (then Turkish first league) between 1971 and 1977. It returned to the top level after 44 years by defeating Tuzlaspor 2–1 on an away match on 9 May 2021. The stay in the Super League lasted for two seasons before they were relegated back to the TFF First League where they lasted only one season before being relegated to the TFF Second League, thus suffering a double relegation.

== League history ==
- Turkish Super League: 1971–1977, 2021–2023
- TFF First League: 1967–1971, 1977–78, 1979–1986, 1988–1991, 1993–1995, 1997–2000, 2007–2012, 2014–2021, 2023–2024
- TFF Second League: 1978–1979, 1986–1988, 1991–1993, 1995–1997, 2000–2001, 2005–2007, 2012–2014, 2024-2025
- TFF Third League: 2001–2005, 2025-

== Players ==
=== Current squad ===
As of 30 January 2024

Note: Flags indicate national team as defined under FIFA eligibility rules; some limited exceptions apply. Players may hold more than one non-FIFA nationality.

No.	Pos.	Nation	Player
1	GK	TUR	Erkan Anapa (captain)
4	DF	TUR	Fatih Yılmaz
5	MF	SEN	Faustin Senghor
7	DF	TUR	Talha Ülvan
9	FW	TUR	Mert Kurt
17	DF	TUR	Şahin Dik
21	FW	TUR	Miraç Çakıroğlu
22	DF	TUR	Ali Akçay
23	DF	TUR	Ertuğrul Şenlikoğlu
24	GK	TUR	Göktan Cörüt
28	MF	TUR	Erol Can Akdağ (captain)
30	FW	TUR	Yunus Emre Kobya
37	DF	TUR	Kadir Seven

No.	Pos.	Nation	Player
50	DF	TUR	Barış Gün
63	FW	TUR	Mustafa Eren Keskin
66	MF	TUR	Alperen Köşker
70	FW	TUR	Emre Nizam
77	DF	TUR	Mehmet Keskin
81	MF	TUR	Enishan Ceylan
82	MF	TUR	Arda Cebeci
84	DF	TUR	Metin Caner Akbayrak
88	DF	TUR	Ahmet Kara
94	DF	TUR	Anıl Yiğit Çınar
97	MF	TUR	Furkan Kütük
99	DF	TUR	Faruk Can Genç
—	GK	TUR	Efe Salih Oksal

== Club officials ==
As of 10 August 2020

Position	Staff
Manager	(Turkey) Serhat Güller
Assistant manager	(Turkey) Umut Erdoğan
First-team coach	(Spain) Paco Vaz
Goalkeeping coach	(Turkey) Mehmet Bağ
Athletic coach	(Turkey) Arda Akdemir
Physiotherapist	(Turkey) Sinan Özcan
Team Manager	(Turkey) Ramazan Büyük
