= 2021–22 Trabzonspor season =

Trabzonspor
2021–22 season
- President: Ahmet Ağaoğlu
- Head coach: Abdullah Avcı
- Stadium: Şenol Güneş Sports Complex
- Süper Lig: 1st
- Turkish Cup: Semi-finals
- UEFA Europa Conference League: Play-off round
- Top goalscorer: League: Andreas Cornelius (15); All: Andreas Cornelius (17)
Home colours	Away colours	Third colours

The 2021–22 season was the 54th season in the existence of Trabzonspor, all coming in the top flight of Turkish football. In addition to the domestic league, Trabzonspor participated in this season's edition of the Turkish Cup and competed in the inaugural UEFA Europa Conference League.

On 30 April 2022, Trabzonspor were crowned Turkish league champions for the first time in 38 years, clinching the title with a 2–2 draw against Antalyaspor.

== Players ==
=== Current squad ===
As of 7 February 2022

Note: Flags indicate national team as defined under FIFA eligibility rules; some limited exceptions apply. Players may hold more than one non-FIFA nationality.

No.	Pos.	Nation	Player
1	GK	TUR	Uğurcan Çakır (captain)
4	DF	TUR	Hüseyin Türkmen
5	MF	TUR	Berat Özdemir
6	MF	GRE	Manolis Siopis
8	MF	TUR	Dorukhan Toköz
9	FW	NGR	Anthony Nwakaeme
10	MF	TUR	Abdülkadir Ömür
11	FW	GRE	Tasos Bakasetas
13	DF	BRA	Vitor Hugo
14	FW	DEN	Andreas Cornelius
15	MF	NOR	Anders Trondsen
16	GK	TUR	Erce Kardeşler
17	MF	SVK	Marek Hamšík
18	MF	BIH	Edin Višća
19	FW	GUI	Bengali-Fodé Koita
20	MF	TUR	Yusuf Erdoğan
21	FW	CPV	Djaniny

No.	Pos.	Nation	Player
22	DF	TUR	Taha Altıkardeş
23	DF	TUR	İsmail Köybaşı
24	DF	SUR	Stefano Denswil (on loan from Bologna)
28	FW	TUR	Salih Kavrazlı
29	MF	TUR	Yunus Mallı
33	DF	BRA	Bruno Peres
37	FW	GER	Emrehan Gedikli
41	MF	AZE	Murat Akpınar
54	GK	TUR	Muhammet Taha Tepe
59	GK	TUR	Arda Akbulut
67	MF	TUR	Kerem Şen
70	DF	TUR	Ahmetcan Kaplan
72	DF	POL	Tymoteusz Puchacz (on loan from Union Berlin)
77	FW	CIV	Jean Evrard Kouassi
90	FW	TUR	Batuhan Kör
94	FW	TUR	Enis Destan
99	DF	TUR	Serkan Asan

=== Out on loan ===
Note: Flags indicate national team as defined under FIFA eligibility rules; some limited exceptions apply. Players may hold more than one non-FIFA nationality.

No.	Pos.	Nation	Player
14	MF	TUR	Hakan Yeşil (at Hekimoğlu Trabzon until 30 June 2022)
17	MF	MLI	Fousseni Diabaté (at Giresunspor until 30 June 2022)
19	MF	TUR	Safa Kınalı (at Tuzlaspor until 30 June 2022)
20	FW	TUR	Anıl Başaran (at Hekimoğlu Trabzon until 30 June 2022)
20	FW	TUR	Koray Kılınç (at Sarıyer until 30 June 2022)
24	MF	BRA	Flávio (at Giresunspor until 30 June 2022)
33	DF	TUR	Abdurrahim Dursun (at Boluspor until 30 June 2022)

No.	Pos.	Nation	Player
39	DF	TUR	Atakan Gündüz (at Hekimoğlu Trabzon until 30 June 2023)
51	MF	TUR	Behlül Aydın (at Şanlıurfaspor until 30 June 2022)
61	MF	TUR	Abdulkadir Parmak (at Kayserispor until 30 June 2022)
66	MF	TUR	Taha Tunç (at Yomraspor until 30 June 2022)
77	MF	TUR	Kerem Baykuş (at Hekimoğlu Trabzon until 30 June 2022)
75	DF	TUR	Faruk Can Genç (at Ümraniyespor until 30 June 2022)
90	MF	TUR	Ebrar Cumur (at İstanbulspor until 30 June 2022)

== Transfers ==
=== In ===
Date	Position	Nationality	Name	From	Fee	Ref.
26 May 2021	DF	(Brazil)	Bruno Peres	(Italy) Roma	Free	
26 May 2021	FW	(Ivory Coast)	Gervinho	(Italy) Parma	Free	
8 June 2021	MF	(Slovakia)	Marek Hamšík	(Sweden) Göteborg	Free	
17 June 2021	FW	(Guinea)	Bengali-Fodé Koita	(Turkey) Kasımpaşa	Free	
21 July 2021	DF	(Turkey)	İsmail Köybaşı	(Turkey) Çaykur Rizespor	Free	
29 July 2021	MF	(Turkey)	Dorukhan Toköz	(Turkey) Beşiktaş	Free	
10 August 2021	FW	(Denmark)	Andreas Cornelius	(Italy) Parma	€5.1m	
18 August 2021	MF	(Greece)	Manolis Siopis	(Turkey) Alanyaspor	€1m	
24 August 2021	DF	(Suriname)	Stefano Denswil	(Italy) Bologna (loan)	Free	
10 December 2021	FW	(Ivory Coast)	Jean Evrard Kouassi	(China) Wuhan	Free	
5 January 2022	MF	(Bosnia and Herzegovina)	Edin Višća	(Turkey) Başakşehir	€4.3m	
10 January 2022	DF	(Poland)	Tymoteusz Puchacz	(Germany) Union Berlin (loan)	€200k	
14 January 2022	MF	(Turkey)	Yusuf Erdoğan	(Turkey) Kasımpaşa	€500k	
24 January 2022	FW	(Turkey)	Enis Destan	(Turkey) Altınordu	€600k	
27 January 2022	MF	(Turkey)	Kerem Şen	(Turkey) Bursaspor	€1.9m+	
27 January 2022	DF	(Turkey)	Taha Altıkardeş	(Turkey) Bursaspor	€1.9m+	
27 January 2022	FW	(Turkey)	Batuhan Kör	(Turkey) Bursaspor	€1.9m+	
7 February 2022	FW	(Germany)	Emrehan Gedikli	(Germany) Leverkusen	€800k	

=== Out ===
Date	Position	Nationality	Name	To	Fee	Ref.
24 June 2021	DF	(Turkey)	Kamil Çörekçi	(Turkey) Hatayspor	Free	
10 July 2021	MF	(Turkey)	Ahmet Canbaz	(Turkey) Erzurumspor	Free	
28 July 2021	DF	(Iran)	Majid Hosseini	(Turkey) Kayserispor	Free	
7 August 2021	FW	(Ghana)	Caleb Ekuban	(Italy) Genoa	€1.8m+	
6 September 2021	DF	(Argentina)	Gastón Campi	(Portugal) Arouca	Free	
9 January 2022	MF	(Turkey)	Yusuf Sarı	(Turkey) Çaykur Rizespor	Free	
14 January 2022	DF	(Guinea-Bissau)	Edgar Ié	Released	—	
14 January 2022	MF	(Turkey)	Abdulkadir Parmak	(Turkey) Kayserispor (loan)	Free	
28 January 2022	FW	(Ivory Coast)	Gervinho	Released^{†}	—	

^† Ongoing contract terminated, new contract made with same terms and conditions effective next season.

== Pre-season and friendlies ==
Win Draw Loss Fixtures

14 July 2021 Friendly	Trabzonspor (Turkey)	5–3	(Turkey) Ümraniyespor	Riva, Turkey
17:00 TRT (UTC+3)

22 July 2021 Friendly	Trabzonspor (Turkey)	1–0	(Turkey) Bandırmaspor	Turkey
18:00 TRT (UTC+3)

24 July 2021 Friendly	Trabzonspor (Turkey)	0–0	(Turkey) İstanbul Başakşehir	Riva, Turkey
18:00 CEST (UTC+2)

25 July 2021 Friendly	Trabzonspor (Turkey)	2–1	(Turkey) Kasımpaşa	Turkey
19:00 TRT (UTC+3)

== Competitions ==
=== Overall record ===
Competition	First match	Last match	Starting round	Final position	Record							
Competition	First match	Last match	Starting round	Final position	Pld	W	D	L	GF	GA	GD	Win %
Süper Lig	12 August 2021	22 May 2022	Matchday 1	Winners	38	23	12	3	69	36	+33	60.53
Turkish Cup	28 December 2021	10 May 2022	Fifth round	Semi-finals	5	4	0	1	8	5	+3	80.00
UEFA Europa Conference League	5 August 2021	26 August 2021	Third qualifying round	Play-off round	4	0	2	2	5	9	−4	0.00
Total					47	27	14	6	82	50	+32	57.45

Last updated: 15 May 2022
Source: Soccerway

=== Süper Lig ===
==== League table ====
Pos	Team	Pld	W	D	L	GF	GA	GD	Pts	Qualification or relegation
1	Trabzonspor (C)	38	23	12	3	69	36	+33	81	Qualification for the Champions League play-off round
2	Fenerbahçe	38	21	10	7	73	38	+35	73	Qualification for the Champions League second qualifying round
3	Konyaspor	38	20	8	10	66	45	+21	68	Qualification for the Europa Conference League second qualifying round
4	Başakşehir	38	19	8	11	56	36	+20	65	Qualification for the Europa Conference League second qualifying round
5	Alanyaspor	38	19	7	12	67	58	+9	64	

Source: Süper Lig
Rules for classification: 1) Points; 2) Head-to-head points; 3) Head-to-head goal difference; 4) Head-to-head goals scored; 5) Goal difference; 6) Goals scored; 7) Play-off.
(C) Champions

==== Results summary ====
Overall								Home						Away					
Pld	W	D	L	GF	GA	GD	Pts	W	D	L	GF	GA	GD	W	D	L	GF	GA	GD
38	23	12	3	69	36	+33	81	12	7	0	35	17	+18	11	5	3	34	19	+15

Last updated: 22 May 2022.
Source: Soccerway

==== Results by matchday ====
Round	1	2	3	4	5	6	7	8	9	10	11	12	13	14	15	16	17	18	19	20	21	22	23	24	25	26	27	28	29	30	31	32	33	34	35	36	37	38
Ground	A	H	A	H	A	A	H	A	H	A	H	A	H	A	H	A	H	A	H	H	A	H	A	H	H	A	H	A	H	A	H	A	H	A	H	A	H	A
Result	W	W	W	D	W	D	D	W	W	W	W	W	W	W	W	L	W	W	D	W	D	D	W	W	W	W	W	D	W	L	D	D	D	W	D	D	W	L
Position	1	2	1	2	2	2	2	2	1	1	1	1	1	1	1	1	1	1	1	1	1	1	1	1	1	1	1	1	1	1	1	1	1	1	1	1	1	1

Updated to match(es) played on 22 May 2022. Source: Soccerway
A = Away; H = Home; B = Bye; W = Win; D = Draw; L = Loss

==== Matches ====
16 August 2021 1	Yeni Malatyaspor	1–5	Trabzonspor	Malatya
19:15	Büyük 32', (yellow card) 89'; Nshimirimana (yellow card) 57'	Report	Bakasetas 3'; Nwakaeme 11', (yellow card) 23'; Gervinho 29'; Hamšík 42'; Djaniny 66' (pen.)	Stadium: New Malatya Stadium; Referee: Atilla Karaoğlan; Assistant referees: Ceyhun Sesigüzel, Volkan Ahmet Narinç; Fourth official: Çağdaş Altay

23 August 2021 2	Trabzonspor	2–1	Sivasspor	Trabzon
19:15	Bakasetas 15' (pen.), (yellow card) 90+5'; Hugo (yellow card) 32'; Nwakaeme 47', (yellow card) 72'; Çakır (yellow card) 90+2'	Report	Okechukwu (yellow card) 13'; Gradel (penalty missed) 70'; Cofie 70'; Vural (yellow card) 90+5'	Stadium: Şenol Güneş Sports Complex; Referee: Abdulkadir Bitigen; Assistant referees: Ali Saygın Ögel, Mustafa Savranlar; Fourth official: Oğuzhan Çakır

29 August 2021 3	Giresunspor	0–1	Trabzonspor	Giresun
21:45	Pelupessy (yellow card) 44'	Report	Bakasetas (yellow card) 4'; Nwakaeme 7'; Köybaşı (yellow card) 25'; Djaniny (yellow card) 72'	Stadium: Çotanak Sports Complex; Referee: Ali Şansalan; Assistant referees: Kerem Ersoy, İbrahim Çağlar Uyarcan; Fourth official: Yiğit Arslan

12 September 2021 4	Trabzonspor	2–2	Galatasaray	Trabzon
20:00	Özdemir (yellow card) 36'; Cornelius 41'; Nwakaeme 62'; Ié (yellow card) 63'	Report	Kutlu (yellow card) 5'; Kılınç 20', 33'	Stadium: Şenol Güneş Sports Complex; Referee: Ali Palabıyık; Assistant referees: Mustafa Emre Eyisoy, Ceyhun Sesigüzel; Fourth official: Ali Şansalan

18 September 2021 5	Kasımpaşa	0–1	Trabzonspor	Istanbul
16:00	Bozok (yellow card) 13'; Yıldırım (yellow card) 78'; Serbest (yellow card) 88'	Report	Bakasetas 53'; Denswil (yellow card) 58'; Peres (yellow card) 87'	Stadium: Recep Tayyip Erdoğan Stadium; Referee: Mete Kalkavan; Assistant referees: Samet Çiçek, Yusuf Bozdoğan; Fourth official: Mustafa Kürşad Filiz

23 September 2021 6	Konyaspor	2–2	Trabzonspor	Konya
17:00	Çekiçi 20', 46', (yellow card) 84'; Bardakcı (yellow card) 49'; Çalık (yellow card) 90+1'	Report	Cornelius 1'; Vitor Hugo (red card) 8'; Hadžiahmetović 76' (o.g.); Ié (yellow card) 84'	Stadium: Konya Metropolitan Municipality Stadium; Referee: Halil Umut Meler; Assistant referees: Cevdet Kömürcüoğlu, Ekrem Kan; Fourth official: Çağdaş Altay

27 September 2021 7	Trabzonspor	1–1	Alanyaspor	Trabzon
20:00	Türkmen (yellow card) 27' (yellow-red card) 75'; Cornelius 42'	Report	Diédhiou 36'; Davidson (yellow card) 79'; Awaziem (yellow card) 80'	Stadium: Şenol Güneş Sports Complex; Referee: Halis Özkahya; Assistant referees: Alpaslan Dedeş, İbrahim Bozbey; Fourth official: Alper Çetin

2 October 2021 8	Kayserispor	1–2	Trabzonspor	Kayseri
16:00	Başsan 41', (yellow card) 86'; Demirok (yellow card) 59'; Demir (yellow card) 90+2'	Report	Bakasetas 12', 60' (pen.); Siopis (yellow card) 35'	Stadium: Kadir Has Stadium; Referee: Tugay Kaan Numanoğlu; Assistant referees: Serkan Ok, Süleyman Özay; Fourth official: Onur Özütoprak

17 October 2021 9	Trabzonspor	3–1	Fenerbahçe	Trabzon
19:00	Bakasetas 25', 87' (pen.); Ié (yellow card) 61'; Kardeşler (yellow card) 88'; Sarı 90'; Çakır (yellow card) 90+2'	Report	Rossi 3'; Kim (yellow card) 14' (yellow-red card) 23'; Gustavo (yellow card) 37'; Valencia (yellow card) 61'; Szalai (yellow card) 85'	Stadium: Şenol Güneş Sports Complex; Referee: Ali Şansalan; Assistant referees: Kerem Ersoy, İbrahim Çağlar Uyarcan; Fourth official: Bahattin Şimşek

23 October 2021 10	Göztepe	0–1	Trabzonspor	İzmir
19:00	Jahović (yellow card) 9'; Eğribayat (yellow card) 45+7'; Aydoğdu (yellow card) 66'; Nukan (yellow card) 90+5'	Report	Hamšík (yellow card) 45+7'; Gervinho 56'; Hugo (yellow card) 59'; Cornelius (yellow card) 90'; Türkmen (yellow card) 90+8'	Stadium: Gürsel Aksel Stadium; Referee: Atilla Karaoğlan; Assistant referees: Kemal Yılmaz, Esat Sancaktar; Fourth official: Kadir Sağlam

29 October 2021 11	Trabzonspor	2–1	Çaykur Rizespor	Trabzon
20:00	Ié (yellow card) 21'; Özdemir (yellow card) 27'; Djaniny 43' (pen.); Trondsen (yellow card) 70'; Nwakaeme 73'	Report	Đoković 22' (pen.); Boldrin (yellow card) 27'; Bolasie (yellow card) 41'; Baiano (yellow card) 62'; Holmén (yellow card) 66'; Boyd (yellow card) 90+6'	Stadium: Şenol Güneş Sports Complex; Referee: Halil Umut Meler; Assistant referees: Mustafa Emre Eyisoy, Volkan Ahmet Narinç; Fourth official: Mert Güzenge

6 November 2021 12	Beşiktaş	1–2	Trabzonspor	Istanbul
19:00	Larin (yellow card) 48', (goal) 62'; Vida (yellow card) 81'; Uçan (yellow card) 90+7'; Welinton (yellow card) 90+10'; Souza (yellow card) 90+11'	Report	Toköz (yellow card) 39'; Siopis (yellow card) 41'; Ömür 45+4'; Cornelius 90+6'; Çakır (yellow card) 90+11' (yellow-red card) FT	Stadium: Vodafone Park; Referee: Erkan Özdamar; Assistant referees: İbrahim Çağlar Uyarcan, Erdinç Sezertam; Fourth official: Alper Ulusoy

22 November 2021 13	Trabzonspor	3–0	Gaziantep	Trabzon
20:00	Ömür 19'; Djaniny 42'; Cornelius 45'	Report	Dicko (yellow card) 6'; Ersoy (yellow card) 23'; Maxim (yellow card) 45+1'; Djilobodji (yellow card) 78'	Stadium: Şenol Güneş Sports Complex; Referee: Suat Arslanboğa; Assistant referees: İsmail Şencan, Süleyman Özay; Fourth official: Bahattin Şimşek

28 November 2021 14	Fatih Karagümrük	0–2	Trabzonspor	Istanbul
16:00	Karamoh (yellow card) 45'	Report	Djaniny 17' (pen.); Ömür (yellow card) 26', (goal) 62'; Ié (yellow card) 45'	Stadium: Atatürk Olympic Stadium; Referee: Cüneyt Çakır; Assistant referees: Esat Sancaktar, Alpaslan Dedeş; Fourth official: Turgut Doman

4 December 2021 15	Trabzonspor	2–0	Adana Demirspor	Trabzon
16:00	Nwakaeme 26'; Hamšík 54'	Report	Balotelli (yellow card) 82'	Stadium: Şenol Güneş Sports Complex; Referee: Fırat Aydınus; Assistant referees: Aleks Taşcıoğlu, Erdem Bayık; Fourth official: Tugay Kaan Numanoğlu

11 December 2021 16	Antalyaspor	2–1	Trabzonspor	Antalya
19:00	Fredy 34' (pen.), (yellow card) 83'; Toköz 73' (o.g.)	Report	Cornelius 24'; Ié (yellow card) 32'; Peres (yellow card) 69'; Koita (yellow card) 80'; Djaniny (yellow card) 88'	Stadium: Antalya Stadium; Referee: Zorbay Küçük; Assistant referees: Cevdet Kömürcüoğlu, Mehmet Emin Tuğral; Fourth official: Kutluhan Bilgiç

18 December 2021 17	Trabzonspor	2–0	Hatayspor	Trabzon
16:00	Djaniny 24'; Cornelius 38'	Report	Ergün (yellow card) FT	Stadium: Şenol Güneş Sports Complex; Referee: Yaşar Kemal Uğurlu; Assistant referees: Tarık Ongun, Serkan Çimen; Fourth official: Turgut Doman

21 December 2021 18	Altay	1–2	Trabzonspor	İzmir
20:00	Karayel 33'; Poko (yellow card) 35'; Pinares (yellow card) 64'; Naderi (yellow card) 83'	Report	Djaniny (yellow card) 25'; Cornelius 51', 88'; Hamšík (yellow card) 58'; Bakasetas (yellow card) 64'	Stadium: Alsancak Mustafa Denizli Stadium; Referee: Ali Şansalan; Assistant referees: Serkan Ok, Kemal Yılmaz; Fourth official: Çağdaş Altay

25 December 2021 19	Trabzonspor	0–0	Başakşehir	Trabzon
19:00	Türkmen (yellow card) 32'	Report	Ndayishimiye (yellow card) 45'; Okaka (yellow card) 89'	Stadium: Şenol Güneş Sports Complex; Referee: Halil Umut Meler; Assistant referees: Mustafa Emre Eyisoy, İbrahim Bozbey; Fourth official: Kutluhan Bilgiç

7 January 2022 20	Trabzonspor	1–0	Yeni Malatyaspor	Trabzon
20:00	Cornelius 23'	Report	Hafez (yellow card) 38'; Nshimirimana (yellow card) 86'	Stadium: Şenol Güneş Sports Complex; Referee: Fırat Aydınus; Assistant referees: Kerem Ersoy, Samet Çiçek; Fourth official: Cihan Aydın

15 January 2022 21	Sivasspor	1–1	Trabzonspor	Sivas
16:00	James 20'; Henrique (yellow card) 67'; Yiğiter (yellow card) 90+5'	Report	Ömür 24'; Türkmen (yellow card) 46'	Stadium: New Sivas 4 Eylül Stadium; Referee: Mete Kalkavan; Assistant referees: Erdinç Sezertam, Süleyman Özay; Fourth official: Yiğit Arslan

19 January 2022 22	Trabzonspor	1–1	Giresunspor	Trabzon
20:00	Türkmen (yellow card) 4'; Erdoğan (yellow card) 77'; Cornelius 78'; Bakasetas (penalty missed) 90+8'	Report	Nayir 68'; Serginho (yellow card) 69'; Yavru (yellow card) 90+5'	Stadium: Şenol Güneş Sports Complex; Referee: Alper Ulusoy; Assistant referees: Mustafa Emre Eyisoy, İbrahim Çağlar Uyarcan; Fourth official: Alper Akarsu

23 January 2022 23	Galatasaray	1–2	Trabzonspor	Istanbul
19:00	Cicâldău 31' (pen.); Marcão (yellow card) 58'; Öztürk (yellow card) 80'	Report	Çakır (yellow card) 30'; Denswil (yellow card) 30'; Peres (yellow card) 41'; Bakasetas 84'; Višća 90'; Mallı (yellow card) 90+3'	Stadium: Nef Stadium; Referee: Atilla Karaoğlan; Assistant referees: Bahattin Duran, Tarık Ongun; Fourth official: Onur Özütoprak

5 February 2022 24	Trabzonspor	1–0	Kasımpaşa	Trabzon
16:00	Višća 6'; Toköz (yellow card) 22'; Peres (yellow card) 74' (yellow-red card) 74'	Report	Elmalı (yellow card) 42'; Eysseric (yellow card) 53' (yellow-red card) 74'; Fall (yellow card) 65'; Břečka (yellow card) 90+5'	Stadium: Şenol Güneş Sports Complex; Referee: Zorbay Küçük; Assistant referees: Ali Saygın Ögel, Esat Sancaktar; Fourth official: Bahattin Şimşek

13 February 2022 25	Trabzonspor	2–1	Konyaspor	Trabzon
19:00	Višća 13', 67'	Report	Dikmen (yellow card) 21'; Bardakcı (yellow card) 54'; Sityá (yellow card) 70'; Cikalleshi 83'	Stadium: Şenol Güneş Sports Complex; Referee: Mete Kalkavan; Assistant referees: Ceyhun Sesigüzel, Alpaslan Dedeş; Fourth official: Hüseyin Göçek

20 February 2022 26	Alanyaspor	0–4	Trabzonspor	Antalya
16:00	Eduardo (penalty missed) 67'	Report	Nwakaeme 5', 26'; Cornelius 36'; Toköz 39'	Stadium: Bahçeşehir Okulları Stadium; Referee: Halil Umut Meler; Assistant referees: Mustafa Emre Eyisoy, İbrahim Çağlar Uyarcan; Fourth official: Direnç Tonusluoğlu

25 February 2022 27	Trabzonspor	3–2	Kayserispor	Trabzon
20:00	Višća 49'; Djaniny 59'; Nwakaeme 90+8' (pen.)	Report	Gavranović 24'; Thiam 45+1'	Stadium: Şenol Güneş Sports Complex; Referee: Erkan Özdamar; Assistant referees: Tarık Ongun, Mustafa Sönmez; Fourth official: Burak Pakkan

6 March 2022 28	Fenerbahçe	1–1	Trabzonspor	Istanbul
19:00	Kahveci (red card) 17'; Crespo (yellow card) 65'; Zajc 71'; Berisha (yellow card) 80'	Report	Nwakaeme 22'; Višća (yellow card) 28'	Stadium: Şükrü Saracoğlu Stadium; Referee: Zorbay Küçük; Assistant referees: Bahattin Duran, Deniz Caner Özaral; Fourth official: Kadir Sağlam

12 March 2022 29	Trabzonspor	4–2	Göztepe	Trabzon
19:00	Çakır (yellow card) 32'; Nwakaeme 34', (yellow card) 45'; Ömür 37', 53'; Djaniny 49'	Report	Akbunar 31', (yellow card) 87'; Kara (yellow card) 32'; Aydoğdu 43'; Emir (yellow card) 83'	Stadium: Şenol Güneş Sports Complex; Referee: Ali Şansalan; Assistant referees: Kemal Yılmaz, Yusuf Bozdoğan; Fourth official: Mehmet Türkmen

18 March 2022 30	Çaykur Rizespor	3–2	Trabzonspor	Rize
20:15	Ponck (yellow card) 39'; Pohjanpalo 59' (pen.), 64' (pen.), 90+5' (pen.); Sertel (yellow card) 88'	Report	Ömür 48'; Denswil (yellow card) 63'; Djaniny 70'; Peres (yellow card) 70'; Kardeşler (yellow card) 90+3'	Stadium: Yeni Rize Şehir Stadium; Referee: Volkan Bayarslan; Assistant referees: Ceyhun Sesigüzel, Kerem Ersoy; Fourth official: Onur Özütoprak

3 April 2022 31	Trabzonspor	1–1	Beşiktaş	Trabzon
20:30	Cornelius 56'; Djaniny (yellow card) 78'; Bakasetas (yellow card) 81'; Siopis (yellow card) 82'	Report	Bozdoğan (yellow card) 36'; Montero (yellow card) 53'; Batshuayi (penalty missed) 69'; Rosier 71'; Karaman (yellow card) 75'; Larin (red card) 80'; Hutchinson (yellow card) 90+1'	Stadium: Şenol Güneş Sports Complex; Referee: Zorbay Küçük; Assistant referees: Serakn Olguncan, Ekrem Kan; Fourth official: Çağdaş Altay

9 April 2022 32	Gaziantep	0–0	Trabzonspor	Gaziantep
20:30	Ersoy (yellow card) 45+2'; Figueiredo (yellow card) 67'; Sagal (yellow card) 72'	Report	Peres (yellow card) 69'	Stadium: Gaziantep Stadium; Referee: Erkan Özdamar; Assistant referees: Hakan Yemişken, Deniz Caner Özaral; Fourth official: Ömer Faruk Turtay

15 April 2022 33	Trabzonspor	1–1	Fatih Karagümrük	Trabzon
20:30	Erdoğan (yellow card) 45+2'; Hugo 58'	Report	Pešić (yellow card) 16'; Biraschi (yellow card) 36'; Biglia 45+4'; Luckassen (yellow card) 45+4'	Stadium: Şenol Güneş Sports Complex; Referee: Halil Umut Meler; Assistant referees: Cevdet Kömürcüoğlu, Murat Tuğberk Curbay; Fourth official: Yiğit Arslan

23 April 2022 34	Adana Demirspor	1–3	Trabzonspor	Adana
20:30	Deli (yellow card) 2'; Vargas 75'; Rémy (penalty missed) 90+3'	Report	Peres 7' (pen.); Cornelius 12'; Djaniny 61'; Çakır (yellow card) 86'	Stadium: New Adana Stadium; Referee: Yaşar Kemal Uğurlu; Assistant referees: Mustafa Sönmez, Serkan Çimen; Fourth official: Ömer Faruk Turtay

29 April 2022 35	Trabzonspor	2–2	Antalyaspor	Trabzon
20:30	Cornelius 3'; Višća (yellow card) 27'; Toköz 62'; Hamšík (yellow card) 65'; Bakasetas (yellow card) 90+4'	Report	Sarı (yellow card) 43'; Ndao 51' (yellow card) 63'; Fredy (penalty missed) 56'; Naldo (yellow card) 57'; Wright 80'; Vural (yellow card) 90+4'	Stadium: Şenol Güneş Sports Complex; Referee: Atilla Karaoğlan; Assistant referees: Serkan Ok, Kemal Yılmaz; Fourth official: Yiğit Arslan

6 May 2022 36	Hatayspor	1–1	Trabzonspor	Antakya
20:00	Ergün (yellow card) 32'; Diouf 90+4'	Report	Bakasetas (penalty missed) 12'; Djaniny 48'	Stadium: New Hatay Stadium; Referee: Volkan Bayarslan; Assistant referees: Bilal Gölen, Furkan Ürün; Fourth official: Oğuzhan Çakır

15 May 2022 37	Trabzonspor	2–1	Altay	Istanbul
16:00	Öztürk 19' (o.g.); Hamšík (yellow card) 41'; Nwakaeme 84' (pen.)	Report	Rodríguez 70'	Stadium: Atatürk Olympic Stadium; Referee: Kadir Sağlam; Assistant referees: Mustafa Sönmez, Candaş Elbil; Fourth official: Çağdaş Altay

22 May 2022 38	Başakşehir	3–1	Trabzonspor	Istanbul
16:00	Okaka 11' (yellow card) 60'; Epureanu 31'; Gürler 42' (yellow card) 78'	Report	Nwakaeme 59'	Stadium: Başakşehir Fatih Terim Stadium; Referee: Atilla Karaoğlan; Assistant referees: Kerem Ersoy, Erdinç Sezertam; Fourth official: Melis Özçiğdem

=== Turkish Cup ===
28 December 2021 Fifth round	Trabzonspor	1–0	Boluspor	Trabzon
18:30	Koita 48'	Report		Stadium: Şenol Güneş Sports Complex; Referee: Tugay Kaan Numanoğlu; Assistant referees: Esat Sancaktar, Murat Ergin Gözütok; Fourth official: Abdullah Buğra Taşkınsoy

9 February 2022 Round of 16	Denizlispor	1–2	Trabzonspor	Denizli
20:30	Lopes (yellow card) 13'; Akdarı 58', (yellow card) 65'	Report	Türkmen 8'; Kaplan (yellow card) 63'; Kouassi 77'; Özdemir (yellow card) 88'	Stadium: Denizli Atatürk Stadium; Referee: Alper Ulusoy; Assistant referees: Cevdet Kömürcüoğlu, İlker Takpak; Fourth official: Oğuzhan Çakır

1 March 2022 Quarter-final	Trabzonspor	2–0	Antalyaspor	Trabzon
20:30	Višća 12'; Özdemir (yellow card) 31', (goal) 89'	Report		Stadium: Şenol Güneş Sports Complex; Referee: Atilla Karaoğlan; Assistant referees: Volkan Ahmet Narinç, Candaş Elbil; Fourth official: Turgut Doman

19 April 2022 Semi-final first leg	Trabzonspor	1–0	Kayserispor	Trabzon
20:30	Bakasetas (yellow card) 69'; Siopis (yellow card) 74'; Puchacz (yellow card) 74'; Cornelius 87'; Hamšík (yellow card) 90+4'	Report	Kemen (yellow card) 62'; Akdağ (yellow card) 69'; Thiam (yellow card) 83'; Pektemek (yellow card) 90+5'	Stadium: Şenol Güneş Sports Complex; Referee: Atilla Karaoğlan; Assistant referees: Kerem Ersoy, İlker Takpak; Fourth official: Mehmet Türkmen

10 May 2022 Semi-final second leg	Kayserispor	4–2 (4–3 agg.)	Trabzonspor	Kayseri
20:30	Kemen (yellow card) 41'; Başsan 48' 90+6' (yellow card) 90+7'; Hosseini 59'; Thiam 90+1' (pen.)	Report	Nwakaeme 3' (pen.); Bakasetas 82'	Stadium: Kadir Has Stadium; Referee: Halil Umut Meler; Assistant referees: Cevdet Kömürcüoğlu, Murat Tuğberk Curbay; Fourth official: Tugay Kaan Numanoğlu

=== UEFA Europa Conference League ===
==== Third qualifying round ====
The draw for the third qualifying round was held on 19 July 2021.

5 August 2021 First leg	Trabzonspor (Turkey)	3–3	(Norway) Molde	Trabzon, Turkey
20:30	Nwakaeme 15'; Hugo 58'; Djaniny 74'; Bakasetas (yellow card) 87', (penalty missed) 90+5'	Report	Brynhildsen 31', 64', (yellow card) 87'; Risa (yellow card) 57'; Sinyan (yellow card) 79'; Hussain 85'	Stadium: Şenol Güneş Sports Complex; Referee: Harm Osmers (Germany); Assistant referees: Dominik Schaal (Germany), Robert Kempter (Germany); Fourth official: Florian Badstübner (Germany)

12 August 2021 Second leg	Molde (Norway)	1–1 (a.e.t.) (4–4 agg.) (3–4 p)	(Turkey) Trabzonspor	Molde, Norway
18:00	Bjørnbak (yellow card) 38'; Eikrem (yellow card) 62'; Sigurðarson 90+7'; Gregersen (yellow card) 119'	Report	Bakasetas (yellow card) 56'; Ié 57'; Hugo (yellow card) 107'; Parmak (yellow card) 120'	Stadium: Aker Stadion; Referee: Fabio Verissimo (Portugal); Assistant referees: Rui Teixeira (Portugal), Pedro Nuno De Sá Martins (Portugal); Fourth official: Antonio Emanuel Carvalho Nobre (Portugal)
	Penalties
	Andersen (penalty missed); Grødem (penalty scored); Sigurðarson (penalty scored); Fofana (penalty missed); Risa (penalty scored)		(penalty scored) Bakasetas; (penalty scored) Peres; (penalty scored) Özdemir; (penalty missed) Ié; (penalty scored) Trondsen

==== Play-off round ====
The draw for the play-off round was held on 2 August 2021.

19 August 2021 First leg	Trabzonspor (Turkey)	1–2	(Italy) Roma	Trabzon, Turkey
20:30	Peres (yellow card) 14'; Ié (yellow card) 57'; Cornelius 64'	Report	Viña (yellow card) 15'; Pellegrini 55'; Shomurodov 81'	Stadium: Şenol Güneş Sports Complex; Referee: Matej Jug (Slovenia); Assistant referees: Manuel Vidali (Slovenia), Robert Vukan (Slovenia); Fourth official: Nejc Kajtazovic (Slovenia)

26 August 2021 Second leg	Roma (Italy)	3–0 (5–1 agg.)	(Turkey) Trabzonspor	Rome, Italy
19:00	Cristante 20'; Veretout (yellow card) 38'; Zaniolo 65'; El Shaarawy 84'; Mancini (yellow card) 90+1'	Report	Siopis (yellow card) 39'; Ié (yellow card) 85'; Djaniny (yellow card) 90+1'	Stadium: Stadio Olimpico; Referee: Srđan Jovanović (Serbia); Assistant referees: Uroš Stojković (Serbia), Milan Mihajlović (Serbia); Fourth official: Novak Simović (Serbia)

== Statistics ==
=== Squad statistics ===
No.	Pos.	Player	Süper Lig						Turkish Cup						UEFA Europa Conference League						Total					
No.	Pos.	Player	Apps	Goal	Asst	Yellow card	Red card	CS	Apps	Goal	Asst	Yellow card	Red card	CS	Apps	Goal	Asst	Yellow card	Red card	CS	Apps	Goal	Asst	Yellow card	Red card	CS
1	GK	(Turkey) Uğurcan Çakır	36	0	0	7	1	11	3	0	0	0	0	2	4	0	0	0	0	0	43	0	0	7	1	13
4	DF	(Turkey) Hüseyin Türkmen	13	0	1	6	1	4	2	1	0	0	0	1	0	0	0	0	0	0	15	1	1	6	1	5
5	MF	(Turkey) Berat Özdemir	36	0	1	2	0	11	4	1	0	2	0	3	3	0	0	0	0	0	43	1	1	4	0	14
6	MF	(Greece) Manolis Siopis	32	0	1	3	0	11	4	0	0	1	0	3	1	0	0	1	0	0	37	0	1	5	0	14
7	MF	(Turkey) Yusuf Sarı	15	1	0	0	0	8	1	0	0	0	0	1	3	0	0	0	0	0	19	1	0	0	0	9
8	MF	(Turkey) Dorukhan Toköz	29	2	2	2	0	11	3	0	0	0	0	2	0	0	0	0	0	0	32	2	2	2	0	13
9	FW	(Nigeria) Anthony Nwakaeme	30	13	10	3	0	9	2	1	1	0	0	1	4	1	0	0	0	0	36	15	11	3	0	10
10	MF	(Turkey) Abdülkadir Ömür	33	7	3	1	0	11	3	0	0	0	0	2	2	0	0	0	0	0	38	7	3	1	0	13
11	MF	(Greece) Anastasios Bakasetas	34	8	4	5	0	8	5	1	1	1	0	3	4	0	3	2	0	0	43	9	8	8	0	11
13	DF	(Brazil) Vitor Hugo	29	1	1	2	1	10	3	0	0	1	0	2	4	1	0	1	0	0	36	2	1	4	1	12
14	FW	(Denmark) Andreas Cornelius	36	15	3	1	0	11	3	1	0	0	0	2	2	1	0	0	0	0	41	17	3	1	0	13
15	MF	(Norway) Anders Trondsen	11	0	0	1	0	4	0	0	0	0	0	0	3	0	0	0	0	0	14	0	0	1	0	4
16	GK	(Turkey) Erce Kardeşler	2	0	0	2	0	1	2	0	0	0	0	1	0	0	0	0	0	0	4	0	0	2	0	2
17	MF	(Slovakia) Marek Hamšík	26	2	3	4	0	9	2	0	0	1	0	1	4	0	0	0	0	0	32	2	3	5	0	10
18	MF	(Bosnia and Herzegovina) Edin Višća	18	5	4	2	0	3	3	1	0	0	0	2	0	0	0	0	0	0	21	6	4	2	0	5
19	FW	(Guinea) Bengali-Fodé Koita	18	0	1	1	0	6	2	1	0	0	0	2	1	0	0	0	0	0	21	1	1	1	0	8
20	MF	(Turkey) Yusuf Erdoğan	12	0	0	2	0	1	3	0	0	0	0	1	0	0	0	0	0	0	15	0	0	2	0	2
21	FW	(Cape Verde) Djaniny	30	10	3	4	0	8	2	0	1	0	0	1	4	1	1	1	0	0	36	11	5	5	0	9
22	DF	(Turkey) Taha Altıkardeş	0	0	0	0	0	0	0	0	0	0	0	0	0	0	0	0	0	0	0	0	0	0	0	0
23	DF	(Turkey) İsmail Köybaşı	13	0	0	1	0	3	2	0	0	0	0	1	3	0	0	0	0	0	18	0	0	1	0	4
24	DF	(Suriname) Stefano Denswil	28	0	2	3	0	10	1	0	0	0	0	1	0	0	0	0	0	0	29	0	2	3	0	11
27	FW	(Ivory Coast) Gervinho	9	2	1	0	0	2	0	0	0	0	0	0	4	0	0	0	0	0	13	2	1	0	0	2
28	FW	(Turkey) Salih Kavrazlı	0	0	0	0	0	0	1	0	0	0	0	1	0	0	0	0	0	0	1	0	0	0	0	1
29	MF	(Turkey) Yunus Mallı	7	0	0	1	0	3	2	0	0	0	0	1	1	0	0	0	0	0	10	0	0	1	0	4
32	DF	(Portugal) Edgar Ié	17	0	0	6	0	7	0	0	0	0	0	0	4	1	0	2	0	0	21	1	0	8	0	7
33	DF	(Brazil) Bruno Peres	27	1	1	7	1	9	4	0	0	0	0	3	4	0	1	1	0	0	35	1	2	8	1	12
37	FW	(Germany) Emrehan Gedikli	0	0	0	0	0	0	0	0	0	0	0	0	0	0	0	0	0	0	0	0	0	0	0	0
39	DF	(Turkey) Atakan Gündüz	0	0	0	0	0	0	0	0	0	0	0	0	0	0	0	0	0	0	0	0	0	0	0	0
41	MF	(Azerbaijan) Murat Akpınar	2	0	0	0	0	0	2	0	1	0	0	1	0	0	0	0	0	0	4	0	1	0	0	1
54	GK	(Turkey) Muhammet Taha Tepe	0	0	0	0	0	0	0	0	0	0	0	0	0	0	0	0	0	0	0	0	0	0	0	0
59	GK	(Turkey) Arda Akbulut	1	0	0	0	0	1	0	0	0	0	0	0	0	0	0	0	0	0	1	0	0	0	0	1
61	MF	(Turkey) Abdulkadir Parmak	4	0	0	0	0	4	0	0	0	0	0	0	2	0	0	1	0	0	6	0	0	1	0	4
67	MF	(Turkey) Kerem Şen	0	0	0	0	0	0	0	0	0	0	0	0	0	0	0	0	0	0	0	0	0	0	0	0
70	DF	(Turkey) Ahmetcan Kaplan	13	0	1	0	0	1	5	0	0	1	0	3	0	0	0	0	0	0	18	0	1	1	0	4
72	DF	(Poland) Tymoteusz Puchacz	9	0	0	0	0	2	4	0	0	1	0	2	0	0	0	0	0	0	13	0	0	1	0	4
75	DF	(Turkey) Faruk Can Genç	0	0	0	0	0	0	0	0	0	0	0	0	0	0	0	0	0	0	0	0	0	0	0	0
77	FW	(Ivory Coast) Jean Evrard Kouassi	11	0	0	0	0	2	3	1	0	0	0	2	0	0	0	0	0	0	14	1	0	0	0	4
90	FW	(Turkey) Batuhan Kör	0	0	0	0	0	0	0	0	0	0	0	0	0	0	0	0	0	0	0	0	0	0	0	0
94	FW	(Turkey) Enis Destan	0	0	0	0	0	0	1	0	0	0	0	0	0	0	0	0	0	0	1	0	0	0	0	0
99	DF	(Turkey) Serkan Asan	10	0	0	0	0	4	4	0	0	0	0	2	3	0	0	0	0	0	17	0	0	0	0	6
