= 2024–25 Göztepe S.K. season =

Göztepe S.K.
2024–25 season
- Chairman: Rasmus Ankersen
- Manager: Stanimir Stoilov
- Stadium: Gürsel Aksel Stadium
- Süper Lig: 7th
- Turkish Cup: Semi-finalist
- Average home league attendance: 15,212

The 2024–25 season is the 100th season in the history of Göztepe S.K., and the club's first season in Süper Lig. In addition to the domestic league, the team is scheduled to participate in the Turkish Cup.

== Squad ==
Position	Number	Player	Date joined	Further data
GK		(Turkey) Arda Özçimen	2018	
GK		(Turkey) Ekrem Kılıçarslan	2024	
GK		(Turkey) Arda Ercan		
DF		(Turkey) İsmail Köybaşı	2022	Captain
DF		(Brazil) Djalma Silva	2024	
DF		(Turkey) Taha Altıkardeş	2023	
DF		(Brazil) Héliton	2024	
DF		(Germany) Koray Günter	2024	
DF		(Turkey) Nazım Sangaré	2024	
DF		(Turkey) Ogün Bayrak	2023	
DF		(Turkey) Ege Yıldırım	2023	
DF		(Denmark) Lasse Nielsen	2023	
DF		(Tanzania) Novatus Miroshi	2024	
MF		(Turkey) Doğan Erdoğan	2023	
MF		(Central African Republic) Isaac Solet	2024	
MF		(Turkey) Yalçın Kayan	2018	
MF		(Turkey) Emir Enes Araz	2023	
MF		(Turkey) Furkan Malak	2022	
MF		(Nigeria) Anthony Dennis	2023	
MF		(Turkey) Ahmed Ildız	2023	
MF		(Slovenia) David Tijanić	2021	
MF		(Japan) Kuryu Matsuki	2024	
FW		(Brazil) Rômulo Cardoso	2024	
FW		(Turkey) Kubilay Kanatsızkuş		

== Transfers ==
=== In ===
Pos.	Player	Transferred from	Fee	Date	Source
DF	(Germany) Koray Günter	(Italy) Hellas Verona	Loan	1 July 2024	
DF	(Tanzania) Novatus Miroshi	(Belgium) Zulte Waregem	Undisclosed	23 July 2024	
MF	(Japan) Kuryu Matsuki	(England) Southampton	Loan	30 July 2024	
FW	(Brazil) Juan	(England) Southampton	Loan	16 August 2024	

=== Out ===
Pos.	Player	Transferred to	Fee	Date	Source
DF	(Turkey) Uğur Kaan Yıldız	(Turkey) Ankara Keçiörengücü	Loan	23 August 2024	
FW	(Senegal) Mame Biram Diouf	(Turkey) Ankara Keçiörengücü	Free	10 September 2024	

== Friendlies ==
=== Pre-season ===
The players gathered at the Urla Adnan Süvari Facilities on 24 June. They continued training in İzmir until 10 July, when they traveled to Bled, Slovenia, where they would camp until 25 July.

13 July 2024 Friendly	Charlton Athletic (England)	3–1	(Turkey) Göztepe	Kranjska Gora, Slovenia
	Campbell 11'; Kanu 16'; A. Mitchell 65'	Report	Sangaré 61'	Stadium: Kranjska Gora; Attendance: 0 Referee: Žnidaršič Andrej

17 July 2024 Friendly	Fehérvár FC (Hungary)	2–2	(Turkey) Göztepe	Bled, Slovenia
10:30 UTC+2	Christensen 16' (pen.), 21'		(penalty missed) 33'; Ildız 33'; Kanatsızkuş 44'	Stadium: Športni Park Bled

20 July 2024 Friendly	Göztepe (Turkey)	3–2	(England) Luton Town	Radomlje, Slovenia
17:00 UTC+2	Kanatsızkuş 25'; Rômulo 28'; Kayan 54'		Nelson 72', 89'	Stadium: Radomlje Sports Park

24 July 2024 Friendly	Göztepe (Turkey)	1–2	(Croatia) NK Istra 1961	Slovenia
17:00

3 August 2024 Friendly	Göztepe (Turkey)	2–0	(Turkey) Kayserispor	İzmir
20:00	Rômulo 8', 63'			Stadium: Gürsel Aksel Stadium

== Competitions ==
=== Overall record ===
Competition	First match	Last match	Starting round	Record							
Competition	First match	Last match	Starting round	Pld	W	D	L	GF	GA	GD	Win %
Süper Lig	10 August 2024	1 June 2025	Matchday 1	8	3	3	2	14	10	+4	37.50
Turkish Cup				0	0	0	0	0	0	+0	—
Total				8	3	3	2	14	10	+4	37.50

Last updated: 19 October 2024
Source: Soccerway

=== Süper Lig ===
==== League table ====
Pos	Team	Pld	W	D	L	GF	GA	GD	Pts
6	Eyüpspor	36	15	8	13	52	47	+5	53
7	Trabzonspor	36	13	12	11	58	45	+13	51
8	Göztepe	36	13	11	12	59	50	+9	50
9	Rizespor	36	15	4	17	52	58	−6	49
10	Kasımpaşa	36	11	14	11	62	63	−1	47

Source: Süper Lig
Rules for classification: 1) Points; 2) Head-to-head points; 3) Head-to-head goal difference; 4) Head-to-head goals scored; 5) Goal difference; 6) Goals scored; 7) Play-off.
(Note: Head-to-head record is used only after all the matches between the teams in question have been played)

==== Results summary ====
Overall								Home						Away					
Pld	W	D	L	GF	GA	GD	Pts	W	D	L	GF	GA	GD	W	D	L	GF	GA	GD
5	2	3	0	8	3	+5	9	2	1	0	7	2	+5	0	2	0	1	1	0

Last updated: 19 October 2024.
Source: Süper Lig

==== Results by round ====
Round	1	2	3	4	5	6	7
Ground	A	H	A	H	P	H	A
Result	D	D	D	W		W	
Position	11	11	10	7	10	6	

Updated to match(es) played on 23 September 2024. Source: Süper Lig
A = Away; H = Home; W = Win; D = Draw; L = Loss

==== Matches ====
The match schedule was released on 11 July 2024.

10 August 2024 1	Antalyaspor	0–0	Göztepe	Antalya
21:45				Stadium: Samsun 19 Mayıs Stadium

17 August 2024 2	Göztepe	2–2	Fenerbahçe	İzmir
21:45	Günter 68'; Rômulo 90+5'		Džeko 45+3' (pen.); En-Nesyri 45+7'	Stadium: Gürsel Aksel Stadium; Referee: Kadir Sağlam

23 August 2024 3	Alanyaspor	1–1	Göztepe	Alanya
21:00				Stadium: Alanya Oba Stadium; Referee: Muhammet Ali Metoğlu

31 August 2024 4	Göztepe	2–0	Bodrum	İzmir
21:45	Rômulo 16'; Djalma Silva 41'			Stadium: Gürsel Aksel Stadium; Referee: Abdullah Buğra Taşkınsoy

5	Bye

23 September 2024 6	Göztepe	3–0	Kayserispor	İzmir
20:00	Altıkardeş 13'; Juan 45+3'; Erdoğan 90+4'			Stadium: Gürsel Aksel Stadium; Referee: Ozan Ergün

28 September 2024 7	Samsunspor	4–3	Göztepe	Samsun
16:00				Stadium: 19 Mayıs Stadium; Referee: Mehmet Türkmen

5 October 2024 8	Göztepe	3–2	Sivasspor	İzmir
16:00 EET	Rômulo Cardoso 6' (yellow card) 90+3'; Solet 10'; Dennis (yellow card) 79'; Fofana 90+4'; Héliton (yellow card) 90+6'	Report	Sonko Sundberg (yellow card) 50'; Çiftçi 55'; Menig 57' (yellow card) 87'	Stadium: Gürsel Aksel Stadium; Attendance: 16,794; Referee: (Turkey) Ali Şansalan

19 October 2024 9	Eyüpspor	1–0	Göztepe	Istanbul
19:00 EET	Kutucu 19'; Turan (yellow card) 90+4'	Report	Matsuki (yellow card) 27'; Solet (yellow card) 83'	Stadium: Recep Tayyip Erdoğan Stadium; Attendance: 2,252; Referee: (Turkey) Turgut Doman

26 October 2024 10	Göztepe	2–1	Trabzonspor	İzmir
19:00 EET	Stoilov (yellow card) 9'; Dennis (red card) 28'; Solet 60' (yellow card) 85'; Tijanić 90+2'	Report	Yokuşlu (yellow card) 41'; Pedro Malheiro (yellow card) 45+5'; Mendy (yellow card) 57'; Banza 64' (pen.)	Stadium: Gürsel Aksel Stadium; Attendance: 17,065; Referee: (Turkey) Cihan Aydın

1 November 2024 11	Gaziantep	2–1	Göztepe	Gaziantep
19:00 EET	Dioudis (yellow card) 32'; Ndiaye (yellow card) 45'; Lungoyi 77'; Sorescu 82' (pen.)	Report	Fofana (yellow card) 21'; Ildiz 64'; Matsuki (yellow card) 69'	Stadium: Gaziantep Stadium; Attendance: 6,613; Referee: (Turkey) Kadir Sağlam

10 November 2024 12	Göztepe	2–0	Konyaspor	İzmir
12:30 EET	Rômulo Cardoso (yellow card) 11' (goal) 90+8' (pen.); Bokele (yellow card) 13'; Köybaşı (yellow card) 90+7'; Matsuki 90+10'	Report	Kramer (yellow card) 6'; Bazoer (yellow card) 86'; Uçar (yellow card) 90+2'; Keyta (yellow card) 90+7'	Stadium: Gürsel Aksel Stadium; Attendance: 16,923; Referee: (Turkey) Muhammet Metoğlu

24 November 2024 13	Beşiktaş	2–4	Göztepe	Istanbul
18:00 EET	Kılıçsoy 3'; Bokele 9' (o.g.); Svensson (yellow card) 64'	Report	Bokele 12'; Altıkardeş 32'; Fofana 82'; Tijanić 90+1'	Stadium: Beşiktaş Stadium; Attendance: 26,740; Referee: (Turkey) Alper Akarsu

30 November 2024 14	İstanbul Başakşehir	4–1	Göztepe	Istanbul
18:00 EET	Davidson 8'; Piątek 10' 43'; Türüç 37' (yellow card) 72'; Ergün (yellow card) 77'	Report	Dennis (yellow card) 45+2'; Héliton (yellow card) 56'; Lucas Lima 61' (o.g.); Djalma Silva (yellow card) 72'	Stadium: Başakşehir Fatih Terim Stadium; Attendance: 1,751; Referee: (Turkey) Çağdaş Altay

7 December 2024 15	Göztepe	3–1	Adana Demirspor	İzmir
15:00 EET	Bayrak (yellow card) 5' (yellow-red card) 76'; Juan 39'; Rômulo Cardoso 42'; Tijanić 59'	Report	Aydoğan (yellow card) 45+2'; Aymbetov 87'	Stadium: Gürsel Aksel Stadium; Attendance: 13,471; Referee: (Turkey) Ali Şansalan

15 December 2024 16	Hatayspor	1–1	Göztepe	Mersin
12:30 EET	Aboubakar 52'; Calvo (yellow card) 60'	Report	Rômulo Cardoso 12' (pen.) (yellow card) 62'; Altıkardeş (yellow card) 28'; Dennis (yellow card) 45+7'	Stadium: Mersin Stadium; Attendance: 2,801; Referee: (Turkey) Atilla Karaoğlan
