= 2023–24 Göztepe S.K. season =

Göztepe S.K.
2023–24 season
- Manager: Stanimir Stoilov
- Stadium: Gürsel Aksel Stadium
- TFF First League: 2nd (promoted)
- Turkish Cup: Fifth round
- Top goalscorer: League: Yalçın Kayan (9); All: Yalçın Kayan (9)

The 2023–24 season was Göztepe S.K.'s 99th season in existence and second consecutive in the TFF First League, the second division of Turkish football. They also competed in the Turkish Cup.

== Players ==
=== First-team squad ===
As of 10 February 2024

Note: Flags indicate national team as defined under FIFA eligibility rules; some limited exceptions apply. Players may hold more than one non-FIFA nationality.

No.	Pos.	Nation	Player
1	GK	POL	Mateusz Lis (on loan from Southampton)
4	DF	TUR	Taha Altıkardeş
5	DF	BRA	Héliton
6	MF	TUR	Celil Yüksel (on loan from Samsunspor)
9	FW	TUR	Kubilay Kanatsızkuş
11	MF	TUR	Ahmed Ildiz
12	DF	TUR	İsmail Köybaşı
13	GK	TUR	Arda Özçimen
14	MF	SWE	Ramon Pascal Lundqvist
15	DF	TUR	Tarkan Serbest
17	FW	TUR	Ensar Aksakal (on loan from Hertha BSC)
18	FW	SEN	Mame Biram Diouf
21	MF	TUR	Doğan Erdoğan (captain)
23	FW	NGR	Kenneth Mamah

No.	Pos.	Nation	Player
24	DF	DEN	Lasse Nielsen
30	MF	TUR	Yalçın Kayan
31	MF	NGR	Anthony Dennis
32	MF	TUR	İzzet Furkan Malak
33	DF	TUR	Atınç Nukan
40	DF	TUR	Ege Yıldırım
45	FW	ALG	Billel Messaoudi (on loan from Kortrijk)
50	DF	ROU	Ümit Akdağ (on loan from Alanyaspor)
77	DF	TUR	Ogün Bayrak
78	GK	TUR	Yiğit Yıldız
79	FW	BRA	Rômulo (on loan from Athletico Paranaense)
81	MF	TUR	Turgay Gemicibaşi
88	DF	TUR	Fıratcan Üzüm

=== Other players under contract ===
Note: Flags indicate national team as defined under FIFA eligibility rules; some limited exceptions apply. Players may hold more than one non-FIFA nationality.

No.	Pos.	Nation	Player
—	MF	TUR	Ömer Samet Akin
—	MF	TUR	Emir Enes Araz

No.	Pos.	Nation	Player
—	MF	TUR	Berkay Atay
—	FW	TUR	Kaan Atalay

=== Out on loan ===
Note: Flags indicate national team as defined under FIFA eligibility rules; some limited exceptions apply. Players may hold more than one non-FIFA nationality.

No.	Pos.	Nation	Player
—	DF	TUR	Emre Gedik (at Kasımpaşa until 30 June 2024)
—	DF	TUR	Erkam Kömür (at 1461 Trabzon FK until 30 June 2024)
—	DF	TUR	Uğur Kaan Yıldız (at Ümraniyespor until 30 June 2024)

No.	Pos.	Nation	Player
—	MF	TUR	Tuğbey Akgün (at İnegölspor until 30 June 2024)
—	MF	SLO	David Tijanić (at Al-Adalah until 30 June 2024)
—	MF	ENG	Romal Palmer (at St Patrick's Athletic until 31 December 2024)

== Transfers ==
=== In ===
Pos.	Player	Transferred from	Fee	Date	Source

=== Out ===
Pos.	Player	Transferred to	Fee	Date	Source

== Pre-season and friendlies ==
Win Draw Loss

15 July 2023 Friendly	Göztepe (Turkey)	1–1	(England) Southampton	İzmir
20:00				Stadium: Bornova Aziz Kocaoğlu Stadium

26 July 2023 Friendly	Legnago Salus (Italy)	0–1	(Turkey) Göztepe	Italy
		Report	Mamah 65' (pen.)

29 July 2023 Friendly	Cremonese (Italy)	1–1	(Turkey) Göztepe	Celledizzo, Italy
	Vázquez 15'	Report	Altıkardeş 27'	Stadium: Campo Calcio Celledizzo

== Competitions ==
=== Overall record ===
Competition	First match	Last match	Starting round	Final position	Record							
Competition	First match	Last match	Starting round	Final position	Pld	W	D	L	GF	GA	GD	Win %
TFF First League	13 August 2023	10 May 2024	Matchday 1	2nd	34	21	7	6	60	20	+40	61.76
Turkish Cup	6 December 2023		Fourth round	Fifth round	2	1	0	1	4	2	+2	50.00
Total					36	22	7	7	64	22	+42	61.11

Source: Soccerway

=== TFF First League ===
==== League table ====
Pos	Team	Pld	W	D	L	GF	GA	GD	Pts	Qualification or relegation
1	Eyüpspor (P)	34	24	3	7	77	31	+46	75	Promotion to the Süper Lig
2	Göztepe (P)	34	21	7	6	60	20	+40	70	Promotion to the Süper Lig
3	Sakaryaspor	34	17	9	8	50	35	+15	60	Qualification for the Süper Lig Playoff Final
4	Bodrum (O, P)	34	15	12	7	43	22	+21	57	Qualification for the Süper Lig Playoff Quarter Finals
5	Çorum	34	16	8	10	55	36	+19	56	Qualification for the Süper Lig Playoff Quarter Finals

Updated to match(es) played on 11 May 2024. Source: TFF
Rules for classification: 1) Points; 2) Head-to-head points; 3) Head-to-head goal difference; 4) Head-to-head goals scored; 5) Goal difference; 6) Goals scored
(O) Play-off winners; (P) Promoted

==== Results summary ====
Overall								Home						Away					
Pld	W	D	L	GF	GA	GD	Pts	W	D	L	GF	GA	GD	W	D	L	GF	GA	GD
34	21	7	6	60	20	+40	70	10	4	3	32	8	+24	11	3	3	28	12	+16

==== Results by round ====
Round	1	2	3	4	5	6	7	8	9	10	11	12	13	14	15	16	17	18	19	20	21	22	23	24	25	26	27	28	29	30	31	32	33	34
Ground	H	A	H	A	H	A	H	A	H	A	H	A	H	H	A	H	A	A	H	A	H	A	H	A	H	A	H	A	H	A	A	H	A	H
Result	L	D	L	W	D	W	W	W	W	W	L	L	W	W	W	W	L	W	W	D	W	W	D	W	W	W	D	L	W	D	W	W	W	D
Position																																		

A = Away; H = Home; W = Win; D = Draw; L = Loss

==== Matches ====
The league fixtures were unveiled on 19 July 2023.

13 August 2023 1	Göztepe	0–1	Sakaryaspor	İzmir
				Stadium: Gürsel Aksel Stadium

19 August 2023 2	Ümraniyespor	0–0	Göztepe

26 August 2023 3	Göztepe	1–2	Çorum	İzmir
				Stadium: Gürsel Aksel Stadium

3 September 2023 4	Altay	0–1	Göztepe

17 September 2023 5	Göztepe	1–1	Bandırmaspor	İzmir
				Stadium: Gürsel Aksel Stadium

23 September 2023 6	Manisa	0–1	Göztepe

2 October 2023 7	Göztepe	1–0	Adanaspor	İzmir
				Stadium: Gürsel Aksel Stadium

8 October 2023 8	Boluspor	0–2	Göztepe

21 October 2023 9	Göztepe	3–0	Şanlıurfaspor	İzmir
				Stadium: Gürsel Aksel Stadium

28 October 2023 10	Ankara Keçiörengücü	0–1	Göztepe

4 November 2023 11	Göztepe	0–1	Kocaelispor	İzmir
				Stadium: Gürsel Aksel Stadium

12 November 2023 12	Erzurumspor	3–2	Göztepe

26 November 2023 13	Göztepe	2–0	Tuzlaspor	İzmir
				Stadium: Gürsel Aksel Stadium

3 December 2023 14	Göztepe	3–0	Giresunspor	İzmir
				Stadium: Gürsel Aksel Stadium

10 December 2023 15	Gençlerbirliği	0–3	Göztepe

20 December 2023 16	Göztepe	5–1	Eyüpspor	İzmir
				Stadium: Gürsel Aksel Stadium

24 December 2023 17	Bodrum	3–0	Göztepe

12 January 2024 18	Sakaryaspor	1–2	Göztepe

22 January 2024 19	Göztepe	4–1	Ümraniyespor	İzmir
				Stadium: Gürsel Aksel Stadium

27 January 2024 20	Çorum	1–1	Göztepe	Çorum

3 February 2024 21	Göztepe	4–0	Altay	İzmir
				Stadium: Gürsel Aksel Stadium

11 February 2024 22	Bandırmaspor	0–2	Göztepe

16 February 2024 23	Göztepe	0–0	Manisa	İzmir
				Stadium: Gürsel Aksel Stadium

24 February 2024 24	Adanaspor	0–3	Göztepe

3 March 2024 25	Göztepe	2–0	Boluspor	İzmir
				Stadium: Gürsel Aksel Stadium

10 March 2024 26	Şanlıurfaspor	0–1	Göztepe

16 March 2024 27	Göztepe	0–0	Ankara Keçiörengücü	İzmir
				Stadium: Gürsel Aksel Stadium

3 April 2024 28	Kocaelispor	3–2	Göztepe	İzmit
20:30	Candeias 83' (pen.), 90' (pen.), 90+9' (pen.)		Ortakaya 44' (o.g.); Kanatsızkuş 71'	Stadium: Kocaeli Stadium

8 April 2024 29	Göztepe	3–0	Erzurumspor	İzmir
				Stadium: Gürsel Aksel Stadium

14 April 2024 30	Tuzlaspor	1–1	Göztepe	Istanbul
13:30	Togui 58'		Pascal Lundqvist 63'	Stadium: Esenyurt Necmi Kadıoğlu Stadium

20 April 2024 31	Giresunspor	0–3	Göztepe	Giresun
16:00			Kayan 41', 49'; Akdağ 68'	Stadium: Çotanak Sports Complex

28 April 2024 32	Göztepe	2–0	Gençlerbirliği	İzmir
	Üzüm 77'; Pascal Lundqvist 90+3'			Stadium: Gürsel Aksel Stadium

4 May 2024 33	Eyüpspor	0–3	Göztepe	Istanbul
19:00	Uçar (red card) 23'		Kanatsızkuş 18'; Akdağ 67'; Messaoudi 73'	Stadium: Eyüp Stadyumu

11 May 2024 34	Göztepe	1–1	Bodrum	İzmir
	Nukan 90+1'		Özer 22' (pen.)	Stadium: Gürsel Aksel Stadium
