= Ahmetcan Kaplan =

Turkish footballer (born 2003)

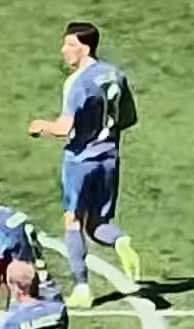
- Kaplan playing for Ajax in 2025

Personal information
- Full name: Ahmetcan Kaplan
- Date of birth: 16 January 2003 (age 23)
- Place of birth: Trabzon, Turkey
- Height: 1.90 m (6 ft 3 in)
- Position: Centre-back

Team information
- Current team: NEC
- Number: 22

Youth career
- 2013–2020: Trabzonspor

Senior career*
| Years | Team | Apps | (Gls) |
| 2020–2022 | Trabzonspor | 13 | (0) |
| 2022–2026 | Ajax | 19 | (0) |
| 2023–2026 | Jong Ajax | 17 | (3) |
| 2025–2026 | → NEC (loan) | 25 | (1) |
| 2026– | NEC | 5 | (0) |

International career^{‡}
| 2018–2019 | Turkey U16 | 8 | (0) |
| 2019–2020 | Turkey U17 | 14 | (1) |
| 2021–2022 | Turkey U19 | 5 | (1) |
| 2022–2024 | Turkey U21 | 7 | (0) |
- * Club domestic league appearances and goals as of 8 November 2026 ‡ National team caps and goals as of 22:24, 15 October 2024 (UTC)

Ahmetcan Kaplan (Turkish: [ah.metˈdʒan kapˈlan]; born 16 January 2003) is a Turkish professional footballer who plays as a centre-back for Eredivisie club NEC.

== Club career ==
=== Trabzonspor ===
A youth product of Trabzonspor, Kaplan signed his first professional contract with the club on 10 August 2020. He made his professional debut for Trabzonspor in a 1–1 Süper Lig tie with Alanyaspor on 27 September 2021.

=== Ajax ===
Kaplan joined Dutch club Ajax of the Eredivisie on a five-year contract in August 2022.

On 25 January 2024, he made his debut as a subtitute in 2-0 Eredivisie away lost against AZ, in 23th week of 2023–24season, then he started 10 match in a row until the end of season.

On 7 March 2024, he made his continental debut against Aston Villa in UEFA Conference League match, which tied as 0-0.

==== Loan to NEC ====
On 29 August 2025, Kaplan was loaned by NEC for the 2025–26 season.

On 13 September 2025, he made his debut with the team against PSV in a 5-3 Eredivisie home lost.

=== NEC ===
On 20 August 2026, he returned to NEC on a permanent basis and signed a four-year contract with the club.

On 15 October 2026, he made his UEFA Europa League match against Levski Sofia in a 1-1 home draw.

== International career ==
Kaplan is an international for Turkey, having earlier been a youth international, represented the Turkey U16s and U17s.

On 7 June 2024, he was selected in Turkey's 26-man squad for the UEFA Euro 2024.

== Career statistics ==
As of match played 8 November 2026

Appearances and goals by club, season and competition
| Club | Season | League | | | Cup | | Europe | | Other | | Total | |
| Club | Season | Division | Apps | Goals | Apps | Goals | Apps | Goals | Apps | Goals | Apps | Goals |
|---|---|---|---|---|---|---|---|---|---|---|---|---|
| Trabzonspor | 2020–21 | Süper Lig | 0 | 0 | 0 | 0 | 0 | 0 | — | | 0 | 0 |
| Trabzonspor | 2021–22 | Süper Lig | 13 | 0 | 5 | 0 | 0 | 0 | — | | 18 | 0 |
| Trabzonspor | Total | | 13 | 0 | 5 | 0 | 0 | 0 | 0 | 0 | 18 | 0 |
| Ajax | 2022–23 | Eredivisie | 0 | 0 | 0 | 0 | 0 | 0 | 0 | 0 | 0 | 0 |
| Ajax | 2023–24 | Eredivisie | 11 | 0 | 0 | 0 | 2 (Note: Appearances in UEFA Europa Conference League) | 0 | 0 | 0 | 13 | 0 |
| Ajax | 2024–25 | Eredivisie | 8 | 0 | 1 | 0 | 3 (Note: Appearances in UEFA Europa League) | 0 | 0 | 0 | 12 | 0 |
| Ajax | Total | | 19 | 0 | 1 | 0 | 5 | 0 | 0 | 0 | 25 | 0 |
| Jong Ajax | 2023–24 | Eerste Divisie | 11 | 0 | — | | — | | — | | 11 | 0 |
| Jong Ajax | 2024–25 | Eerste Divisie | 3 | 2 | — | | — | | — | | 3 | 2 |
| Jong Ajax | 2025–26 | Eerste Divisie | 3 | 1 | — | | — | | — | | 3 | 1 |
| Jong Ajax | Total | | 17 | 3 | — | | — | | — | | 17 | 3 |
| NEC (loan) | 2025–26 | Eredivisie | 25 | 1 | 5 | 1 | — | | — | | 30 | 2 |
| NEC | 2026–27 | Eredivisie | 5 | 0 | 0 | 0 | 3 | 0 | — | | 8 | 0 |
| NEC | Total | | 28 | 1 | 5 | 1 | 3 | 0 | 0 | 0 | 38 | 2 |
| Career total | | | 76 | 4 | 11 | 1 | 8 | 0 | 0 | 0 | 95 | 5 |

== Honours ==
Trabzonspor

- Süper Lig: 2021–22
- Turkish Super Cup: 2022
