= List of İstanbul Başakşehir F.K. managers =

This is a list of all managers of İstanbul Başakşehir, including honours.

== Managers ==
Managers	Nationality	From	Until	Notes
No Information From 1990 to 1994 (Note: No Domestic Results)
Recai Çaloğlu	Turkey	1994	1995	
Cihat Erbil	Turkey	1995	1995	
Turhan Özyazanlar	Turkey	1995	1996	
Fahrettin Genç	Turkey	1996	2000	1 TFF Second League champions
Ali Osman Renklibay	Turkey	2000	2002	
Kadir Özcan	Turkey	2002	2002	
Ekrem Al	Turkey	2002	2003	
Ali Osman Renklibay	Turkey	2003	2004	
Uğur Tütüneker	Turkey	2004	2005	
Hüsnü Özkara	Turkey	2005	2006	
Abdullah Avcı	Turkey	2006	2011	1 Turkish Cup Final
Arif Erdem	Turkey	2011	2012	
Carlos Carvalhal	Portugal	2012	2012	First non-Turkish manager
Bülent Korkmaz	Turkey	2012	2013	
Cihat Arslan	Turkey	2013	2014	1 TFF First League champions
From 1990–91 to 2013–14 season as İstanbul Büyükşehir Belediyespor
Abdullah Avcı	Turkey	2014	2019	2 Süper Lig Runners-up 1 Turkish Cup Final
Okan Buruk	Turkey	2019	2021	1 Süper Lig champions 1 Turkish Super Cup Final
Aykut Kocaman	Turkey	2021	2021	
Emre Belözoğlu	Turkey	2021	2023	
Çağdaş Atan	Turkey	2023		

== Records ==
=== Nationalities ===
Country	Managers	Trophies
(Turkey)	14	2
(Portugal)	1	0

=== Most games managed ===
Name	Nat.	Games
Abdullah Avcı	(Turkey)	337
Cihat Arslan	(Turkey)	39
Uğur Tütüneker	(Turkey)	33
Arif Erdem	(Turkey)	32
Bülent Korkmaz	(Turkey)	23
