= 2021–22 Süper Lig =

64th season of top-tier Turkish football

Süper Lig
- Season: 2021–22
- Dates: 13 August 2021 – 22 May 2022
- Champions: Trabzonspor; 7th title
- Relegated: Çaykur Rizespor; Altay; Göztepe; Yeni Malatyaspor
- Champions League: Trabzonspor; Fenerbahçe
- Europa League: Sivasspor
- Europa Conference League: Konyaspor; İstanbul Başakşehir
- Matches: 380
- Goals: 1,067 (2.81 per match)
- Top goalscorer: Umut Bozok (20 goals)
- Biggest home win: Adana Demirspor 7–0 Göztepe (22 May 2022)
- Biggest away win: Çaykur Rizespor 0–6 Fenerbahçe (22 April 2022); Göztepe 1–7 Çaykur Rizespor (1 May 2022)
- Highest scoring: Alanyaspor 6–3 Kayserispor (18 October 2021)
- Longest winning run: Trabzonspor (8 matches)
- Longest unbeaten run: Antalyaspor (16 matches)
- Longest winless run: Yeni Malatyaspor (17 matches)
- Longest losing run: Göztepe (10 matches)

The 2021–22 Süper Lig, officially called the Spor Toto Süper Lig Ahmet Çalık season, was the 64th season of the Süper Lig, the highest tier football league of Turkey.

Trabzonspor clinched their seventh league title, and a first since the 1983–84 season, on 30 April 2022, following 2–2 draw against Antalyaspor. With three weeks in the season still to spare, this equalled the earliest championship record set by Fenerbahçe.

== Teams ==
A total of 20 teams contested the league, including 17 sides from the 2020–21 season and 2020–21 TFF First League champions Adana Demirspor, runner-ups Giresunspor and play-off winners Altay. Adana Demirspor returned top level after 26 years, Giresunspor returned after 44 years and Altay after 18 years. For the first time in 40 years, there was no team from the capital city, Ankara. The bottom four teams were relegated to the 2022–23 TFF First League.

=== Stadiums and locations ===
Location of teams in 2021–22 Süper Lig
Istanbul Province clubs

Team	Home city	Stadium	Capacity
Adana Demirspor	Adana	New Adana Stadium	33,543
Alanyaspor	Alanya	Bahçeşehir Okulları Stadium	10,130
Altay	İzmir (Alsancak)	Alsancak Mustafa Denizli Stadium	14,000
Antalyaspor	Antalya (Muratpaşa)	Antalya Stadium	32,537
Beşiktaş	Istanbul (Beşiktaş)	Vodafone Park	42,590
Çaykur Rizespor	Rize	Yeni Rize Şehir Stadı	15,332
Fatih Karagümrük	Istanbul (Fatih)	Atatürk Olympic Stadium	76,761
Fenerbahçe	Istanbul (Kadıköy)	Şükrü Saracoğlu Stadium	47,834
Galatasaray	Istanbul (Sarıyer)	Nef Stadium	52,280
Gaziantep	Gaziantep	Kalyon Stadium	33,502
Giresunspor	Giresun	Çotanak Sports Complex	22,028
Göztepe	İzmir (Göztepe)	Gürsel Aksel Stadium	25,035
Hatayspor	Antakya	New Hatay Stadium	25,000
İstanbul Başakşehir	Istanbul (Başakşehir)	Başakşehir Fatih Terim Stadium	17,156
Kasımpaşa	Istanbul (Beyoğlu)	Recep Tayyip Erdoğan Stadium	14,234
Kayserispor	Kayseri	Kadir Has Stadium	32,864
Konyaspor	Konya	Medaş Konya Metropolitan Stadium	42,000
Sivasspor	Sivas	New Sivas 4 Eylül Stadium	27,532
Trabzonspor	Trabzon	Şenol Güneş Sports Complex	40,782
Yeni Malatyaspor	Malatya	New Malatya Stadium	27,044

=== Personnel and sponsorship ===
Team	Head coach	Captain	Kit manufacturer	Sponsor
Adana Demirspor	(Italy) Vincenzo Montella	(Switzerland) Gökhan Inler	New Balance	Bitexen
Alanyaspor	(Italy) Francesco Farioli	(Turkey) Efecan Karaca	Uhlsport	TAV Airports
Altay	(Turkey) Sinan Kaloğlu	(Turkey) İbrahim Öztürk	Nike	Folkart
Antalyaspor	(Turkey) Nuri Şahin	(Turkey) Hakan Özmert	New Balance	Bitexen
Beşiktaş	(France) Valérien Ismaël	(Canada) Atiba Hutchinson	Adidas	Beko
Çaykur Rizespor	(Turkey) Bülent Korkmaz	(Turkey) Gökhan Gönül	Nike	Çaykur
Fatih Karagümrük	(Turkey) Volkan Demirel	(Argentina) Lucas Biglia	Wulfz	VavaCars
Fenerbahçe	(Turkey) İsmail Kartal	(Germany) Mesut Özil	Puma	Avis
Galatasaray	(Turkey) Okan Buruk	(Uruguay) Fernando Muslera	Nike	Sixt
Gaziantep	(Turkey) Erol Bulut	(Turkey) Günay Güvenç	Nike	Sanko
Giresunspor	(Turkey) Hakan Keleş	(Senegal) Ibrahima Baldé	Nike	Bahçeşehir Koleji
Göztepe	(Turkey) Serdar Sabuncu	(Turkey) Halil Akbunar	Umbro	Folkart
Hatayspor	(Turkey) Ömer Erdoğan	(Senegal) Mame Diouf	Nike	Bitexen
İstanbul Başakşehir	(Turkey) Emre Belözoğlu	(Turkey) Mahmut Tekdemir	Bilcee	Decovita
Kasımpaşa	(Turkey) Sami Uğurlu	(Suriname) Ryan Donk	Puma	Ciner
Kayserispor	(Turkey) Hikmet Karaman	(Turkey) İlhan Parlak	Nike	İstikbal
Konyaspor	(Turkey) İlhan Palut	(Bosnia and Herzegovina) Ibrahim Šehić	Macron	Atiker
Sivasspor	(Turkey) Rıza Çalımbay	(Turkey) Ziya Erdal	Puma	Demir İnşaat
Trabzonspor	(Turkey) Abdullah Avcı	(Turkey) Uğurcan Çakır	Macron	Vestel
Yeni Malatyaspor	(Turkey) Cihat Arslan	(Turkey) Ertaç Özbir	Macron	Onvo

=== Managerial changes ===
Team	Outgoing manager	Manner of departure	Date of vacancy	Position in table	Replaced by	Date of appointment
Gaziantep FK	(Portugal) Ricardo Sá Pinto	Sacked	20 May 2021	Pre-season	(Turkey) Erol Bulut	20 May 2021
Fenerbahçe	(Turkey) Emre Belözoğlu	End of interim period	1 June 2021	Pre-season	(Portugal) Vítor Pereira	2 July 2021
Kasımpaşa	(Turkey) Şenol Can	Mutual agreement	15 August 2021	5th	(Turkey) Cihat Arslan	17 August 2021
Kayserispor	(Turkey) Yalçın Koşukavak	Mutual agreement	18 August 2021	19th	(Turkey) Hikmet Karaman	18 August 2021
Adana Demirspor	(Turkey) Samet Aybaba	Resignation	29 August 2021	14th	(Italy) Vincenzo Montella	1 September 2021
Göztepe	(Turkey) Ünal Karaman	Mutual agreement	31 August 2021	14th	(Serbia) Nestor El Maestro	8 September 2021
Alanyaspor	(Turkey) Çağdaş Atan	Sacked	2 September 2021	13th	(Turkey) Bülent Korkmaz	6 September 2021
Çaykur Rizespor	(Turkey) Bülent Uygun	Mutual agreement	22 September 2021	20th	(Turkey) Hamza Hamzaoğlu	24 September 2021
İstanbul Başakşehir	(Turkey) Aykut Kocaman	Resignation	2 October 2021	15th	(Turkey) Emre Belözoğlu	4 October 2021
Yeni Malatyaspor	(Turkey) İrfan Buz	Mutual agreement	3 October 2021	17th	(Romania) Marius Șumudică	8 October 2021
Antalyaspor	(Turkey) Ersun Yanal	Sacked	4 October 2021	14th	(Turkey) Nuri Şahin	5 October 2021
Kasımpaşa	(Turkey) Cihat Arslan	Mutual agreement	23 October 2021	19th	(Turkey) Hakan Kutlu	28 October 2021
Beşiktaş	(Turkey) Sergen Yalçın	Resignation	9 December 2021	9th	(Turkey) Önder Karaveli	13 January 2022
Fatih Karagümrük	(Italy) Francesco Farioli	Mutual agreement	16 December 2021	11th	(Turkey) Volkan Demirel	17 December 2021
Kasımpaşa	(Turkey) Hakan Kutlu	Mutual agreement	18 December 2021	20th	(Turkey) Sami Uğurlu	20 December 2021
Fenerbahçe	(Portugal) Vítor Pereira	Sacked	20 December 2021	5th	(Turkey) İsmail Kartal	12 January 2022
Alanyaspor	(Turkey) Bülent Korkmaz	Mutual agreement	30 December 2021	8th	(Italy) Francesco Farioli	31 December 2021
Galatasaray	(Turkey) Fatih Terim	Mutual agreement	10 January 2022	12th	(Spain) Domènec Torrent	11 January 2022
Altay	(Turkey) Mustafa Denizli	Mutual agreement	13 January 2022	18th	(Brazil) Mert Nobre	15 January 2022
Altay	(Brazil) Mert Nobre	Sacked	26 January 2022	19th	(Turkey) Serkan Özbalta	27 January 2022
Yeni Malatyaspor	(Romania) Marius Șumudică	Sacked	7 February 2022	20th	(Turkey) Adem Büyük	7 February 2022
Çaykur Rizespor	(Turkey) Hamza Hamzaoğlu	Resignation	19 February 2022	18th	(Turkey) Bülent Korkmaz	20 February 2022
Yeni Malatyaspor	(Turkey) Adem Büyük	Mutual agreement	24 February 2022	20th	(Turkey) Cihat Arslan	1 March 2022
Göztepe	(Serbia) Nestor El Maestro	Sacked	7 March 2022	17th	(Croatia) Stjepan Tomas	9 March 2022
Altay	(Turkey) Serkan Özbalta	Resignation	22 March 2022	17th	(Turkey) Sinan Kaloğlu	24 March 2022
Beşiktaş	(Turkey) Önder Karaveli	Resignation	25 March 2022	8th	(France) Valérien Ismaël	25 March 2022
Göztepe	(Croatia) Stjepan Tomas	Mutual agreement	27 April 2022	18th	(Turkey) Serdar Sabuncu	29 April 2022

=== Foreign players ===
Club	Player 1	Player 2	Player 3	Player 4	Player 5	Player 6	Player 7	Player 8	Player 9	Player 10	Player 11	Player 12	Player 13	Player 14	Former Players
Adana Demirspor	(Argentina) Matías Vargas	(Croatia) Damjan Đoković	(Democratic Republic of the Congo) Britt Assombalonga	(France) Benjamin Stambouli	(France) Loïc Rémy	(Iceland) Birkir Bjarnason	(Italy) Mario Balotelli	(Ivory Coast) Simon Deli	(Kosovo) Arijanet Muric	(Morocco) Younès Belhanda	(Nigeria) Babajide David	(Norway) Jonas Svensson	(Senegal) Joher Rassoul		(Argentina) Lucas Castro (The Gambia) Pa Dibba (Nigeria) Francis Ezeh
Alanyaspor	(Angola) Wilson Eduardo	(Colombia) Cristian Borja	(Netherlands) Leroy Fer	(Nigeria) Chidozie Awaziem	(Portugal) Daniel Candeias	(Portugal) João Novais	(Portugal) Marafona	(Senegal) Famara Diédhiou	(Serbia) Nemanja Milunović	(Slovenia) Miha Mevlja	(Spain) Juanfran				(Brazil) Davidson (Greece) Manolis Siopis (Senegal) Khouma Babacar
Altayspor	(Brazil) Thaciano	(Chile) César Pinares	(Chile) Martín Rodríguez	(Gabon) André Poko	(Egypt) Ahmed Rayyan	(Iran) Mohammad Naderi	(Ivory Coast) Daouda Bamba	(Ivory Coast) Serge Aka	(Poland) Mateusz Lis	(Portugal) Marco Paixão	(Senegal) Khaly Thiam	(Suriname) Leandro Kappel	(Sweden) Eric Björkander		
Antalyaspor	(Algeria) Houssam Ghacha	(Angola) Fredy	(Belgium) Ruud Boffin	(Bosnia and Herzegovina) Deni Milošević	(Brazil) Fernando	(Brazil) Luiz Adriano	(Brazil) Naldo	(Italy) Andrea Poli	(Netherlands) Sherel Floranus	(Portugal) Diogo Sousa	(Russia) Fyodor Kudryashov	(Senegal) Alassane Ndao	(Switzerland) Admir Mehmedi	(United States) Haji Wright	(Brazil) Amilton (France) Enzo Crivelli (Nigeria) Paul Mukairu
Beşiktaş	(Algeria) Rachid Ghezzal	(Belgium) Michy Batshuayi	(Bosnia and Herzegovina) Miralem Pjanić	(Brazil) Alex Teixeira	(Brazil) Souza	(Brazil) Welinton	(Canada) Atiba Hutchinson	(Canada) Cyle Larin	(Croatia) Domagoj Vida	(Democratic Republic of the Congo) Fabrice Nsakala	(France) Georges-Kévin Nkoudou	(France) Valentin Rosier	(Serbia) Adem Ljajić	(Spain) Javi Montero	
Çaykur Rizespor	(Brazil) Baiano	(Brazil) Fernando Boldrin	(Brazil) Ronaldo Mendes	(Burkina Faso) Bryan Dabo	(Cape Verde) Carlos Ponck	(Democratic Republic of the Congo) Yannick Bolasie	(Finland) Joel Pohjanpalo	(Nigeria) Aminu Umar	(Portugal) Gedson Fernandes	(Senegal) Papiss Cissé	(Slovakia) Erik Sabo	(South Africa) Lebogang Phiri	(Sweden) Sebastian Holmén	(United States) Tyler Boyd	(Croatia) Damjan Đoković (Democratic Republic of the Congo) Nathan Monzango (France) Loïc Rémy
Fatih Karagümrük	(Argentina) Lucas Biglia	(Bosnia and Herzegovina) Ervin Zukanović	(Croatia) Kristijan Bistrović	(France) Yann Karamoh	(France) Yannis Salibur	(Georgia (country)) Vato Arveladze	(Guinea) Abdoulaye Touré	(Italy) Davide Biraschi	(Italy) Emiliano Viviano	(Italy) Fabio Borini	(Netherlands) Derrick Luckassen	(Nigeria) Ahmed Musa	(Serbia) Aleksandar Pešić	(Slovenia) Jure Balkovec	(Italy) Andrea Bertolacci (Morocco) Medhi Benatia (Norway) Vegar Hedenstad
Fenerbahçe	(Argentina) José Sosa	(Brazil) Luiz Gustavo	(Czech Republic) Filip Novák	(Democratic Republic of the Congo) Marcel Tisserand	(Ecuador) Enner Valencia	(Germany) Mërgim Berisha	(Greece) Dimitrios Pelkas	(Hungary) Attila Szalai	(Nigeria) Bright Osayi-Samuel	(Portugal) Miguel Crespo	(Slovenia) Miha Zajc	(South Korea) Kim Min-jae	(Uruguay) Diego Rossi		(Germany) Max Meyer (Tanzania) Mbwana Samatta
Galatasaray	(Algeria) Sofiane Feghouli	(Brazil) Marcão	(Chile) Erick Pulgar	(Denmark) Victor Nelsson	(Egypt) Mostafa Mohamed	(France) Bafétimbi Gomis	(France) Sacha Boey	(Netherlands) Patrick van Aanholt	(Netherlands) Ryan Babel	(Norway) Omar Elabdellaoui	(Romania) Alexandru Cicâldău	(Romania) Olimpiu Moruțan	(Spain) Iñaki Peña	(Uruguay) Fernando Muslera	(Brazil) Gustavo Assunção (Colombia) Radamel Falcao (Democratic Republic of the Congo) Christian Luyindama (Senegal) Mbaye Diagne (United States) DeAndre Yedlin
Gaziantep	(Brazil) João Figueiredo	(Chile) Ángelo Sagal	(Greece) Stelios Kitsiou	(Kazakhstan) Alexander Merkel	(Morocco) Ahmed El Messaoudi	(Morocco) Hamza Mendyl	(North Macedonia) Luka Stankovski	(Norway) Torgeir Børven	(Poland) Paweł Olkowski	(Romania) Alexandru Maxim	(Romania) Alin Toșca	(Senegal) Papy Djilobodji	(Sierra Leone) Steven Caulker	(Slovenia) Amedej Vetrih	(Brazil) Jefferson Júnior (Mali) Nouha Dicko
Giresunspor	(Brazil) Douglas	(Brazil) Flávio	(Brazil) Serginho	(Colombia) Alexis Pérez	(Mali) Fousseni Diabaté	(Mali) Hamidou Traoré	(Netherlands) Joey Pelupessy	(New Zealand) Joe Champness	(Portugal) Chiquinho	(Russia) Magomed-Shapi Suleymanov	(Senegal) Ibrahima Baldé	(Senegal) Mamadou Diarra			(Mauritania) Souleymane Doukara (Senegal) Younousse Sankharé
Göztepe	(Argentina) Franco Di Santo	(Belgium) Dino Arslanagić	(Bosnia and Herzegovina) Kenan Pirić	(Bosnia and Herzegovina) Marko Mihojević	(Brazil) Lourency	(Germany) Makana Baku	(Morocco) Oussama Tannane	(Nigeria) Obinna Nwobodo	(North Macedonia) Adis Jahović	(Senegal) Cherif Ndiaye	(Slovenia) David Tijanić	(Switzerland) François Moubandje	(Venezuela) Wilker Ángel		(Bosnia and Herzegovina) Dženan Bureković (Hungary) Balázs Megyeri (Nigeria) Brown Ideye
Hatayspor	(Algeria) Yassine Benzia	(Canada) Sam Adekugbe	(Egypt) Kahraba	(France) Mehdi Boudjemaa	(Georgia (country)) Saba Lobzhanidze	(Ghana) Isaac Sackey	(Guinea) Simon Falette	(Mali) Adama Traoré	(Morocco) Ayoub El Kaabi	(Morocco) Munir Mohamedi	(Portugal) Rúben Ribeiro	(Republic of the Congo) Dylan Saint-Louis	(Senegal) Mame Biram Diouf		(Bulgaria) Strahil Popov (Liberia) Mohammed Kamara
İstanbul Başakşehir	(Belgium) Nacer Chadli	(Brazil) Júnior Caiçara	(Brazil) Léo Duarte	(Brazil) Lucas Lima	(Burundi) Youssouf Ndayishimiye	(Egypt) Trézéguet	(Italy) Stefano Okaka	(Moldova) Alexandru Epureanu	(Norway) Fredrik Gulbrandsen	(Portugal) Pizzi	(Serbia) Danijel Aleksić				(Austria) Peter Žulj (Bosnia and Herzegovina) Edin Višća (Cape Verde) Carlos Ponck
Kasımpaşa	(Australia) Awer Mabil	(Bosnia and Herzegovina) Haris Hajradinović	(Czech Republic) Michal Trávník	(Czech Republic) Tomáš Břečka	(Democratic Republic of the Congo) Jackson Muleka	(France) Valentin Eysseric	(Kosovo) Florent Hadergjonaj	(Morocco) Rayane Aabid	(Netherlands) Jeffrey Bruma	(North Macedonia) Berat Kalkan	(Senegal) Mamadou Fall	(Serbia) Uroš Spajić	(Suriname) Ryan Donk	(Tunisia) Mortadha Ben Ouanes	(Denmark) Nicolai Jørgensen (Hungary) Kevin Varga (Kosovo) Loret Sadiku (Morocco) Nabil Dirar
Kayserispor	(Brazil) Gustavo Campanharo	(Cameroon) Olivier Kemen	(France) Lionel Carole	(Ghana) Bernard Mensah	(Ghana) Joseph Attamah	(Greece) Dimitrios Kolovetsios	(Guinea-Bissau) Carlos Mané	(Iran) Majid Hosseini	(Italy) Andrea Bertolacci	(Portugal) Miguel Cardoso	(Romania) Silviu Lung Jr.	(Senegal) Mame Thiam	(Sierra Leone) Jocelyn Janneh	(Switzerland) Mario Gavranović	(Bosnia and Herzegovina) Zoran Kvržić (Nigeria) Anthony Uzodimma (North Macedonia) Daniel Avramovski (Portugal) Manuel Fernandes
Konyaspor	(Albania) Endri Çekiçi	(Albania) Sokol Cikalleshi	(Bosnia and Herzegovina) Amar Rahmanović	(Bosnia and Herzegovina) Amir Hadžiahmetović	(Bosnia and Herzegovina) Ibrahim Šehić	(Bosnia and Herzegovina) Marin Aničić	(Brazil) Amilton	(Brazil) Guilherme	(Democratic Republic of the Congo) Paul-José M'Poku	(Egypt) Ahmed Hassan	(Kosovo) Zymer Bytyqi	(Poland) Konrad Michalak	(Slovenia) Nejc Skubic		(North Macedonia) Erdon Daci (Ukraine) Artem Kravets
Sivasspor	(Brazil) Pedro Henrique	(Gabon) Aaron Appindangoyé	(Ghana) Isaac Cofie	(Greece) Dimitrios Goutas	(Ivory Coast) Max Gradel	(Mali) Mustapha Yatabaré	(Mali) Samba Camara	(Morocco) Fayçal Fajr	(Nigeria) Leke James	(Nigeria) Olarenwaju Kayode	(Norway) Fredrik Ulvestad	(Senegal) Moussa Konaté	(Spain) Jorge Félix		(Nigeria) Azubuike Okechukwu
Trabzonspor	(Bosnia and Herzegovina) Edin Višća	(Brazil) Bruno Peres	(Brazil) Vitor Hugo	(Cape Verde) Djaniny	(Denmark) Andreas Cornelius	(Greece) Anastasios Bakasetas	(Greece) Manolis Siopis	(Guinea) Bengali-Fodé Koita	(Ivory Coast) Jean Evrard Kouassi	(Nigeria) Anthony Nwakaeme	(Norway) Anders Trondsen	(Poland) Tymoteusz Puchacz	(Slovakia) Marek Hamšík	(Suriname) Stefano Denswil	(Guinea-Bissau) Edgar Ié (Ivory Coast) Gervinho
Yeni Malatyaspor	(Algeria) Mehdi Zeffane	(Argentina) Gastón Campi	(Burundi) Eric Ndizeye	(Burundi) Jospin Nshimirimana	(Egypt) Karim Hafez	(France) Mounir Chouiar	(Ghana) Benjamin Tetteh	(Ghana) Godfred Donsah	(Ghana) Haqi Osman	(Ghana) Philip Awuku	(Mali) Nouha Dicko	(Nigeria) Azubuike Okechukwu	(Scotland) Stevie Mallan	(Tunisia) Oussama Haddadi	(Brazil) Wallace (Democratic Republic of the Congo) Walter Bwalya (Gabon) Didier Ndong (Morocco) Rayane Aabid

== League table ==
Pos	Team	Pld	W	D	L	GF	GA	GD	Pts	Qualification or relegation
1	Trabzonspor (C)	38	23	12	3	69	36	+33	81	Qualification for the Champions League play-off round
2	Fenerbahçe	38	21	10	7	73	38	+35	73	Qualification for the Champions League second qualifying round
3	Konyaspor	38	20	8	10	66	45	+21	68	Qualification for the Europa Conference League second qualifying round
4	Başakşehir	38	19	8	11	56	36	+20	65	Qualification for the Europa Conference League second qualifying round
5	Alanyaspor	38	19	7	12	67	58	+9	64	
6	Beşiktaş	38	15	14	9	56	48	+8	59 (Note: Beşiktaş finished ahead of Antalyaspor on head-to-head points: Antalyaspor 2–3 Beşiktaş, Beşiktaş 0–0 Antalyaspor.)	
7	Antalyaspor	38	16	11	11	54	47	+7	59	
8	Fatih Karagümrük	38	16	9	13	47	52	−5	57	
9	Adana Demirspor	38	15	10	13	60	47	+13	55	
10	Sivasspor	38	14	12	12	52	50	+2	54	Qualification for the Europa League play-off round (Note: Sivasspor qualified for the Europa League play-off round as the 2021–22 Turkish Cup winners.)
11	Kasımpaşa	38	15	8	15	67	57	+10	53 (Note: Kasımpaşa finished ahead of Hatayspor on head-to-head points: Hatayspor 1–1 Kasımpaşa, Kasımpaşa 3–1 Hatayspor.)	
12	Hatayspor	38	15	8	15	56	60	−4	53	
13	Galatasaray	38	14	10	14	51	53	−2	52	
14	Kayserispor	38	12	11	15	54	61	−7	47	
15	Gaziantep	38	12	10	16	48	56	−8	46	
16	Giresunspor	38	12	9	17	41	47	−6	45	
17	Çaykur Rizespor (R)	38	10	6	22	44	71	−27	36	Relegation to TFF First League
18	Altay (R)	38	9	7	22	39	57	−18	34	Relegation to TFF First League
19	Göztepe (R)	38	7	7	24	40	77	−37	28	Relegation to TFF First League
20	Yeni Malatyaspor (R)	38	5	5	28	27	71	−44	20	Relegation to TFF First League

Source: Süper Lig
Rules for classification: 1) Points; 2) Head-to-head points; 3) Head-to-head goal difference; 4) Head-to-head goals scored; 5) Goal difference; 6) Goals scored; 7) Play-off.
(C) Champions; (R) Relegated

== Results ==
Home \ Away	ADE	ALA	ALT	ANT	BEŞ	RİZ	FKA	FEN	GAL	GFK	GİR	GÖZ	HAT	İBA	KAS	KAY	KON	SİV	TRA	YMA
Adana Demirspor	—	1–2	3–1	0–0	1–1	3–1	5–0	0–1	2–0	4–0	1–0	7–0	1–0	2–1	0–0	1–1	1–1	2–3	1–3	0–2
Alanyaspor	1–3	—	1–4	1–3	2–0	2–1	1–1	2–5	1–1	3–0	1–0	2–2	6–0	1–1	2–0	6–3	5–1	0–1	0–4	2–1
Altay	1–3	0–2	—	1–2	2–1	0–0	0–1	0–2	0–1	3–2	1–1	2–1	1–2	1–1	2–4	3–0	0–1	1–1	1–2	1–0
Antalyaspor	1–2	3–0	1–0	—	2–3	3–2	3–0	1–1	1–1	0–0	4–1	1–1	4–1	1–2	1–1	1–1	3–2	1–0	2–1	1–0
Beşiktaş	3–3	4–1	1–0	0–0	—	3–0	1–0	1–1	2–1	1–0	0–4	2–1	1–1	2–2	0–3	4–2	1–1	2–1	1–2	3–0
Rizespor	1–3	2–0	1–2	2–1	2–2	—	0–0	0–6	2–3	0–1	1–2	3–1	0–2	0–2	2–1	1–0	2–1	1–2	3–2	1–0
Fatih Karagümrük	4–0	0–1	0–0	0–0	0–1	2–0	—	1–1	1–1	3–2	2–1	3–1	1–1	3–1	3–2	3–0	1–4	1–0	0–2	1–0
Fenerbahçe	1–2	1–2	2–1	2–0	2–2	4–0	0–0	—	2–0	3–2	2–1	2–0	2–0	0–1	2–1	2–2	2–1	1–1	1–1	2–0
Galatasaray	3–2	0–1	2–2	2–0	2–1	4–2	2–0	1–2	—	2–0	0–1	2–1	2–1	1–1	1–3	1–1	1–0	2–3	1–2	2–0
Gaziantep	0–3	2–1	4–1	2–0	0–0	2–0	3–1	3–2	3–1	—	1–1	1–1	2–2	1–0	2–0	1–1	3–2	5–1	0–0	0–0
Giresunspor	2–0	1–3	3–1	1–2	0–0	2–0	3–1	1–2	0–2	2–1	—	3–1	0–1	1–1	0–2	1–1	0–0	2–2	0–1	1–0
Göztepe	1–1	0–2	0–2	4–0	0–2	1–7	0–1	1–1	2–3	2–1	0–1	—	0–2	2–1	2–3	1–2	0–2	2–1	0–1	0–1
Hatayspor	0–0	5–0	0–1	3–1	1–0	0–0	3–0	1–2	4–2	2–1	4–1	2–1	—	0–3	1–1	2–1	1–3	1–1	1–1	5–2
İstanbul Başakşehir	2–1	0–1	0–0	0–1	3–2	3–0	1–2	2–0	0–0	2–0	3–1	1–2	3–0	—	2–1	0–1	2–1	2–1	3–1	1–0
Kasımpaşa	4–0	2–2	2–0	2–4	1–1	3–1	1–3	1–2	2–2	2–1	2–0	1–2	3–1	2–3	—	3–1	2–2	1–3	0–1	2–0
Kayserispor	1–1	1–2	1–0	2–0	2–3	1–1	2–1	0–4	3–0	0–0	2–1	1–1	4–3	1–0	2–0	—	2–3	3–0	1–2	3–0
Konyaspor	1–0	1–1	3–1	1–0	1–0	3–0	1–2	2–1	2–0	4–1	1–0	3–0	3–1	2–1	4–4	2–0	—	0–1	2–2	0–0
Sivasspor	1–1	1–0	2–1	2–2	2–3	1–1	4–0	1–1	1–0	1–1	0–0	2–2	4–0	0–2	1–3	2–1	0–1	—	1–1	1–2
Trabzonspor	2–0	1–1	2–1	2–2	1–1	2–1	1–1	3–1	2–2	3–0	1–1	4–2	2–0	0–0	1–0	3–2	2–1	2–1	—	1–0
Yeni Malatyaspor	1–0	2–6	2–1	1–2	1–1	1–3	3–4	0–5	0–0	2–0	0–1	1–2	0–2	1–3	0–2	2–2	2–3	0–1	1–5	—

Source: Turkish Football Federation (in Turkish)
Legend: Blue = home team win; Yellow = draw; Red = away team win.
For upcoming matches, an "a" indicates there is an article about the rivalry between the two participants.

== Number of teams by region ==
Number	Region	Team(s)
6	Marmara	Beşiktaş, Fatih Karagümrük, Fenerbahçe, Galatasaray, İstanbul Başakşehir and Kasımpaşa
4	Mediterranean	Adana Demirspor, Alanyaspor, Antalyaspor and Hatayspor
3	Black Sea	Çaykur Rizespor, Giresunspor and Trabzonspor
3	Central Anatolia	Kayserispor, Konyaspor and Sivasspor
2	Aegean	Altay and Göztepe
1	Eastern Anatolia	Yeni Malatyaspor
1	Southeastern Anatolia	Gaziantep

== Statistics ==
=== Top scorers ===
Rank	Player	Club(s)	Goals
1	(Turkey) Umut Bozok	Kasımpaşa	20
2	(Italy) Mario Balotelli	Adana Demirspor	18
2	(Morocco) Ayoub El Kaabi	Hatayspor	18
4	(Finland) Joel Pohjanpalo	Çaykur Rizespor	16
5	(Denmark) Andreas Cornelius	Trabzonspor	15
5	(Turkey) Serdar Dursun	Fenerbahçe	15
7	(Belgium) Michy Batshuayi	Beşiktaş	14
7	(Romania) Alexandru Maxim	Gaziantep	14
7	(Serbia) Aleksandar Pešić	Fatih Karagümrük	14
7	(United States) Haji Wright	Antalyaspor	14

=== Clean sheets ===
Rank	Player	Club(s)	Clean sheets
1	(Bosnia and Herzegovina) Ibrahim Šehić	Konyaspor	12
2	(Turkey) Uğurcan Çakır	Trabzonspor	11
2	(Italy) Emiliano Viviano	Fatih Karagümrük	11
4	(Turkey) Altay Bayındır	Fenerbahçe	10
5	(Turkey) Volkan Babacan	İstanbul Başakşehir	9
5	(Belgium) Ruud Boffin	Antalyaspor	9
5	(Turkey) Ersin Destanoğlu	Beşiktaş	9
5	(Turkey) Günay Güvenç	Gaziantep	9
5	(Turkey) Okan Kocuk	Giresunspor	9
10	(Romania) Silviu Lung Jr.	Kayserispor	8
10	(Morocco) Munir	Hatayspor	8
10	(Kosovo) Arijanet Muric	Adana Demirspor	8
10	(Uruguay) Fernando Muslera	Galatasaray	8

=== Hat-tricks ===
Date	Player	For	Against	Result
27 August 2021	(United States) Haji Wright	Antalyaspor	Çaykur Rizespor	3–2 (H)
26 September 2021	(Italy) Stefano Okaka	İstanbul Başakşehir	Çaykur Rizespor	3–0 (H)
28 November 2021	(Mali) Mustapha Yatabaré	Sivasspor	Hatayspor	4–0 (H)
5 December 2021	(Turkey) Serdar Dursun	Fenerbahçe	Çaykur Rizespor	4–0 (H)
9 January 2022	(Senegal) Cherif Ndiaye	Göztepe	Antalyaspor	4–0 (H)
20 January 2022	(Turkey) Emre Akbaba	Alanyaspor	Hatayspor	6–0 (H)
27 February 2022	(Morocco) Ayoub El Kaabi	Hatayspor	Yeni Malatyaspor	5–2 (H)
13 March 2022	(Brazil) Pedro Henrique	Sivasspor	Adana Demirspor	3–2 (A)
18 March 2022	(Turkey) Emre Mor	Fatih Karagümrük	Kayserispor	3–0 (H)
18 March 2022	(Finland) Joel Pohjanpalo	Çaykur Rizespor	Trabzonspor	3–2 (H)
22 April 2022	(Turkey) Serdar Dursun	Fenerbahçe	Çaykur Rizespor	6–0 (A)
22 May 2022	(Italy) Mario Balotelli ^{5}	Adana Demirspor	Göztepe	7–0 (H)

^{5} Player scored five goals

== Awards ==
=== Annual awards ===
Team of the Season
Goalkeeper	(Uruguay) Fernando Muslera (Galatasaray)			
Defence	(Denmark) Jens Stryger Larsen (Trabzonspor)	(Turkey) Tayyip Talha Sanuç (Beşiktaş)		(Colombia) Alexis Pérez (Giresunspor)
Midfield	(Turkey) İrfan Kahveci (Fenerbahce)	(Bosnia and Herzegovina) Amir Hadžiahmetović (Konyaspor)	(Slovakia) Marek Hamšík (Trabzonspor)	(Morocco) Younès Belhanda (Adana Demirspor)
Attack	(Romania) Alexandru Maxim (Gazisehir)	(Senegal) Mbaye Diagne (Fatih Karagümrük)		(Morocco) Ayoub El Kaabi (Hatayspor)
