= Rômulo Cardoso =

Brazilian footballer

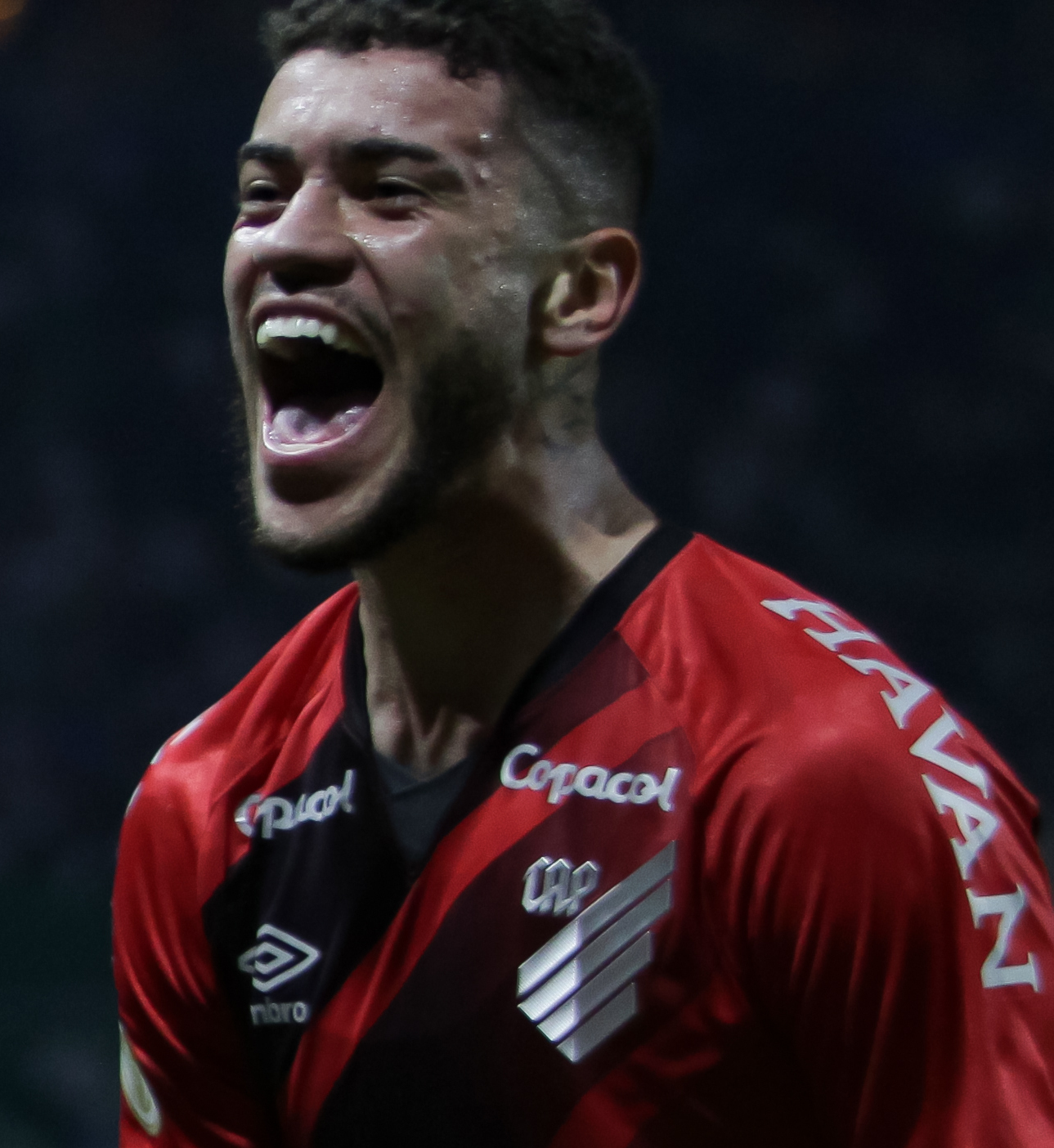
- Rômulo with Athletico Paranaense in 2022

Personal information
- Full name: Rômulo José Cardoso da Cruz
- Date of birth: 8 February 2002 (age 24)
- Place of birth: Marialva, Brazil
- Height: 1.93 m (6 ft 4 in)
- Position: Forward

Team information
- Current team: RB Leipzig
- Number: 40

Youth career
- Maringá
- 2018–2019: → Athletico Paranaense (loan)
- 2019–2021: Athletico Paranaense

Senior career*
Years	Team	Apps	(Gls)
2021–2025	Athletico Paranaense	63	(7)
2024–2025	→ Göztepe (loan)	29	(14)
2025	Göztepe	13	(4)
2025–	RB Leipzig	36	(13)
- * Club domestic league appearances and goals as of 31 October 2026

Rômulo José Cardoso da Cruz (born 8 February 2002), known as Rômulo Cardoso or just Rômulo, is a Brazilian footballer who plays as a forward for Bundesliga club RB Leipzig.

== Club career ==
=== Athletico Paranaense ===
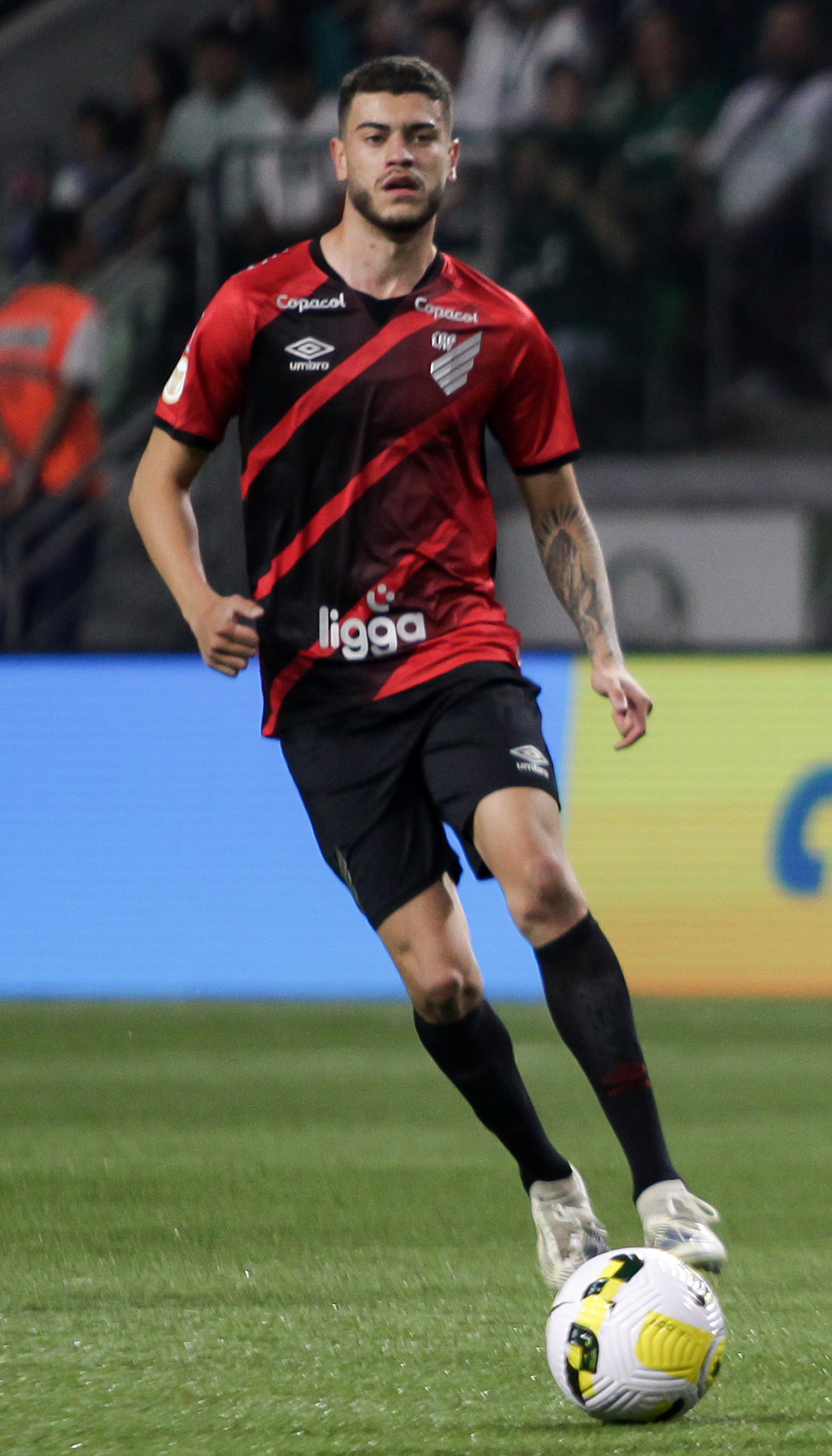
Rômulo with Athletico Paranaense in 2022

Born in Marialva, Paraná, Rômulo joined Athletico Paranaense's youth setup in 2018, on loan from Maringá. In July 2019, he was bought outright by the club.

Rômulo made his first team – and Série A – debut on 16 November 2021, coming on as a second-half substitute for Pedro Rocha in a 0–1 home loss against Atlético Mineiro. He scored his first senior goal on 23 January 2022, netting a last-minute winner in a 1–0 Campeonato Paranaense home win over Paraná.

On 19 February 2022, Rômulo scored a hat-trick in a 5–1 home win over Cianorte.

=== Göztepe ===
On 7 February 2024, Rômulo joined Göztepe in Turkey on loan with an option to buy.

On 11 February 2024, he made his professional debut with Göztepe in a TFF 1. Lig match against Bandırmaspor, he played 27 minutes in a 0–2 Göztepe victory where he scored one goal and made one assist. On 17 August 2024, he made his first Süper Lig goal with the team in a match against Fenerbahçe as a late equalizer 90+5 goal, in a 2–2 draw.

On 24 January 2025, Göztepe announced that they exercised their option to buy and signed a permanent contract with Rômulo until 2028.

=== RB Leipzig ===
On 15 August 2025, Rômulo signed a five-year contract with German club RB Leipzig. Later that month, on 30 August, he netted his first goal in a 2–0 win over Heidenheim.

== Career statistics ==
As of match played 31 October 2026

Appearances and goals by club, season and competition
Club	Season	League			State league (Note: Includes Campeonato Paranaense)		National cup (Note: Includes Copa do Brasil, Turkish Cup, DFB-Pokal)		Continental		Other		Total	
Club	Season	Division	Apps	Goals	Apps	Goals	Apps	Goals	Apps	Goals	Apps	Goals	Apps	Goals
Athletico Paranaense	2021	Série A	1	0	0	0	0	0	0	0	—		1	0
Athletico Paranaense	2022	Série A	26	1	12	6	2	1	9 (Note: Appearances in Copa Libertadores)	1	2 (Note: Appearances in Recopa Sudamericana)	0	51	9
Athletico Paranaense	2023	Série A	18	0	5	0	1	0	4	1	—		28	1
Athletico Paranaense	2024	Série A	—		1	0	—		—		—		1	0
Athletico Paranaense	Total		45	1	18	6	3	1	13	2	2	0	81	10
Göztepe (loan)	2023–24	TFF 1. Lig	13	5	—		—		—		—		13	5
Göztepe	2024–25	Süper Lig	29	13	—		4	4	—		—		33	17
Göztepe	Total		42	18	—		4	4	—		—		46	22
RB Leipzig	2025–26	Bundesliga	30	9	—		2	0	—		—		32	9
RB Leipzig	2026–27	Bundesliga	6	4	—		1	0	2 (Note: Appearances in UEFA Champions League)	0	—		9	4
RB Leipzig	Total		36	13	—		1	0	2	0	—		41	13
Career total			123	32	18	6	10	5	15	2	2	0	168	45

== Honours ==
Athletico Paranaense

- Copa Sudamericana: 2021
- Campeonato Paranaense: 2023
