= Muhammet Taha Tepe =

Turkish footballer (born 2001)

Personal information
- Date of birth: 1 January 2001 (age 25)
- Place of birth: Sakarya, Turkey
- Height: 1.85 m (6 ft 1 in)
- Position: Goalkeeper

Team information
- Current team: Iğdır
- Number: 1

Youth career
- 2012–2013: Sapanca Akademi Spor
- 2013–2014: Sakaryaspor
- 2014–2019: Altınordu

Senior career*
Years	Team	Apps	(Gls)
2019–2020	Altınordu	0	(0)
2019–2020	→ Niğde Anadolu (loan)	25	(0)
2020–2025	Trabzonspor	12	(0)
2021	→ Turgutluspor (loan)	10	(0)
2025–	Iğdır	21	(0)

International career^{‡}
2016	Turkey U15	2	(0)
2016–2017	Turkey U16	5	(0)
2017–2018	Turkey U17	7	(0)
2018–2019	Turkey U18	4	(0)
2019	Turkey U19	4	(0)
2022	Turkey U21	1	(0)
- * Club domestic league appearances and goals as of 24 October 2026 ‡ National team caps and goals as of 15:44, 20 June 2022 (UTC)

Muhammet Taha Tepe (born 1 January 2001) is a Turkish professional footballer who plays as a goalkeeper for TFF 1. Lig club Iğdır.

== Club career ==
Born in Sakarya, Tepe was trained in the youth academies of Sapanca Akademi Spor and Sakaryaspor before joining Altınordu in 2014. He was included in The Guardian's "Next Generation 2018", highlighting the best young players worldwide. After progressing through the youth ranks at Altınordu, he was loaned to 2. Lig side Niğde Anadolu for the 2019–20 season.

In June 2020, Tepe joined Süper Lig side Trabzonspor on a five-year contract. He was loaned to the 2. Lig again in January 2021, this time with Turgutluspor.

== Career statistics ==
=== Club ===
As of 20 June 2022.

Club	Season	League			Cup		Other		Total	
Club	Season	Division	Apps	Goals	Apps	Goals	Apps	Goals	Apps	Goals
Altınordu	2019–20	1. Lig	0	0	0	0	0	0	0	0
Niğde Anadolu (loan)	2019–20	2. Lig	25	0	1 (Note: Appearances in the Turkish Cup)	0	0	0	26	0
Trabzonspor	2020–21	Süper Lig	0	0	0	0	0	0	0	0
Trabzonspor	2021–22	Süper Lig	0	0	0	0	0	0	0	0
Trabzonspor	Total		0	0	0	0	0	0	0	0
Turgutluspor (loan)	2020–21	2. Lig	10	0	0	0	0	0	10	0
Career total			35	0	1	0	0	0	36	0

== Honours ==
Trabzonspor

- Süper Lig: 2021–22
- Turkish Super Cup: 2022
