= Kuryu Matsuki =

Japanese footballer

Kuryu Matsuki 松木 玖生
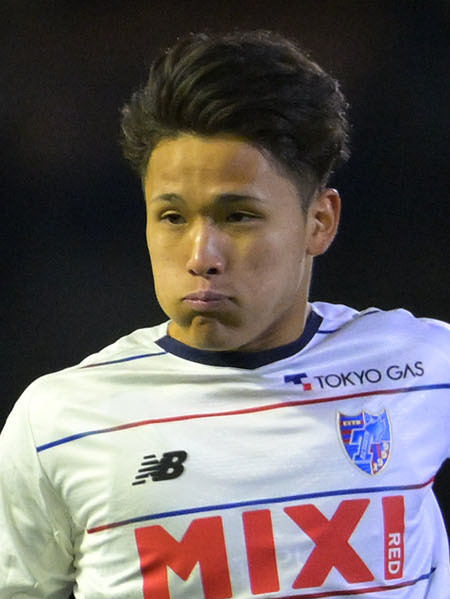
- Matsuki with FC Tokyo in 2022

Personal information
- Full name: Kuryu Matsuki
- Date of birth: 30 April 2003 (age 23)
- Place of birth: Muroran, Hokkaido, Japan
- Height: 1.80 m (5 ft 11 in)
- Positions: Midfielder; forward

Team information
- Current team: Southampton
- Number: 27

Youth career
- 2010–2015: Muroran Osawa FC
- 2016–2018: Aomori Yamada Junior High School
- 2019–2021: Aomori Yamada High School

Senior career*
Years	Team	Apps	(Gls)
2022–2024	FC Tokyo	71	(5)
2024–	Southampton	36	(8)
2024–2025	→ Göztepe (loan)	28	(2)

International career^{‡}
2018	Japan U15		
2019	Japan U16		
2020	Japan U17		
2022–2023	Japan U20	11	(4)
2021–2024	Japan U23	18	(4)
2026–	Japan	2	(1)
Medal record
Men's football
Representing Japan
AFC U-23 Asian Cup
Bronze medal – third place	2022 Uzbekistan	Team
Gold medal – first place	2024 Qatar	Team
- * Club domestic league appearances and goals as of 15:39, 21 November 2026 (UTC) ‡ National team caps and goals as of 08:28, 6 October 2026 (UTC)

Kuryu Matsuki (松木 玖生, Matsuki Kuryū; born 30 April 2003) is a Japanese professional footballer who plays as a midfielder and forward for EFL Championship club Southampton and the Japan national team.

Matsuki began his senior career at FC Tokyo. In 2024, he joined English club Southampton. Matsuki spent the 2024–25 season on loan at Göztepe.

== Club career ==
=== Early career ===
Born in Muroran, Hokkaido, Matsuki followed in his older brother's footsteps by joining local side Muroran Osawa FC.

Matsuki trained with French Ligue 1 side Olympique Lyonnais in 2021. Following this trial, he returned to Japan to lift the 2021 All Japan High School Soccer Tournament for Aomori Yamada High School, scoring in both the semi-final and final.

=== FC Tokyo ===
Initially set to move to Europe to pursue a professional career, it was announced that Matsuki would sign for J1 League side FC Tokyo ahead of the 2022 season. Matsuki stated that a major influence on his decision to stay in Japan was current FC Tokyo player Yuto Nagatomo, who also started his career with Tokyo before moving to Europe.

In November 2023, Matsuki was named AFC Youth Player of the Year following an impressive season for FC Tokyo as well as captaining the national U-20 team.

=== Southampton ===
On 30 July 2024, Matsuki joined Premier League club Southampton on a four-year contract; he was subsequently sent on loan to Turkish side Göztepe for the 2024–25 season. Matsuki made his first appearance for Göztepe on 23 September 2024 in a 1–1 draw with Alanyaspor after he replaced Isaac Solet in the 79th minute. On 10 November 2024, he scored his first goal for the club in a 2–0 victory against Konyaspor.

On 12 August 2025, Matsuki made his debut for Southampton in a 1–0 away victory against Northampton Town in the EFL Cup after he replaced Damion Downs in the 63rd minute. He scored his first goal for the club on 26 August in a 3–0 away victory against Norwich City in the EFL Cup. On 24 February 2026, Matsuki scored his first league goals for the club in a 5–0 victory against Queens Park Rangers.

== International career ==
Matsuki was called up to the Japan U20 squad for the 2023 FIFA U-20 World Cup. On 4 April 2024, he was called up to the Japan U23 squad for the 2024 AFC U-23 Asian Cup.

On 17 September 2026, Matsuki was named in the Japan senior squad to face friendlies against Uruguay and Venezuela before their Kirin Cup semi-final match against Ecuador. He scored on his debut in a 3–1 victory against Uruguay on 24 September 2026.

== Career statistics ==
=== Club ===
As of 21 November 2026

Appearances and goals by club, season and competition
Club	Season	League			National cup (Note: Includes Emperor's Cup, FA Cup, Turkish Cup)		League cup (Note: Includes J. League Cup, EFL Cup)		Other		Total	
Club	Season	Division	Apps	Goals	Apps	Goals	Apps	Goals	Apps	Goals	Apps	Goals
FC Tokyo	2022	J1 League	31	2	0	0	0	0	—		31	2
FC Tokyo	2023	J1 League	22	1	3	1	3	0	—		28	2
FC Tokyo	2024	J1 League	18	2	1	1	1	0	—		20	3
FC Tokyo	Total		71	5	4	2	4	0	—		79	7
Southampton	2024–25	Premier League	0	0	0	0	0	0	—		0	0
Southampton	2025–26	Championship	20	4	4	1	2	1	2 (Note: Appearances in Championship play-offs)	0	28	6
Southampton	2026–27	Championship	16	4	0	0	2	0	—		18	4
Southampton	Total		36	8	4	1	4	1	2	0	46	10
Göztepe (loan)	2024–25	Süper Lig	28	2	6	4	—		—		34	6
Career total			135	15	14	7	8	1	2	0	159	23

=== International ===
As of match played 5 October 2026

Appearances and goals by national team and year
National team	Year	Apps	Goals
Japan	2026	2	1
Total		2	1

As of match played 24 September 2026
Japan score listed first, score column indicates score after each Matsuki goal

List of international goals scored by Kuryu Matsuki
No.	Date	Venue	Opponent	Score	Result	Competition
1	24 September 2026	Miyagi Stadium, Rifu, Japan	Uruguay	1–0	3–1	2026 Kirin Challenge Cup

== Honours ==
Japan U23

- AFC U-23 Asian Cup: 2024

Individual

- AFC Youth Player of the Year: 2023
