= Ümit Akdağ =

Romanian footballer (born 2003)

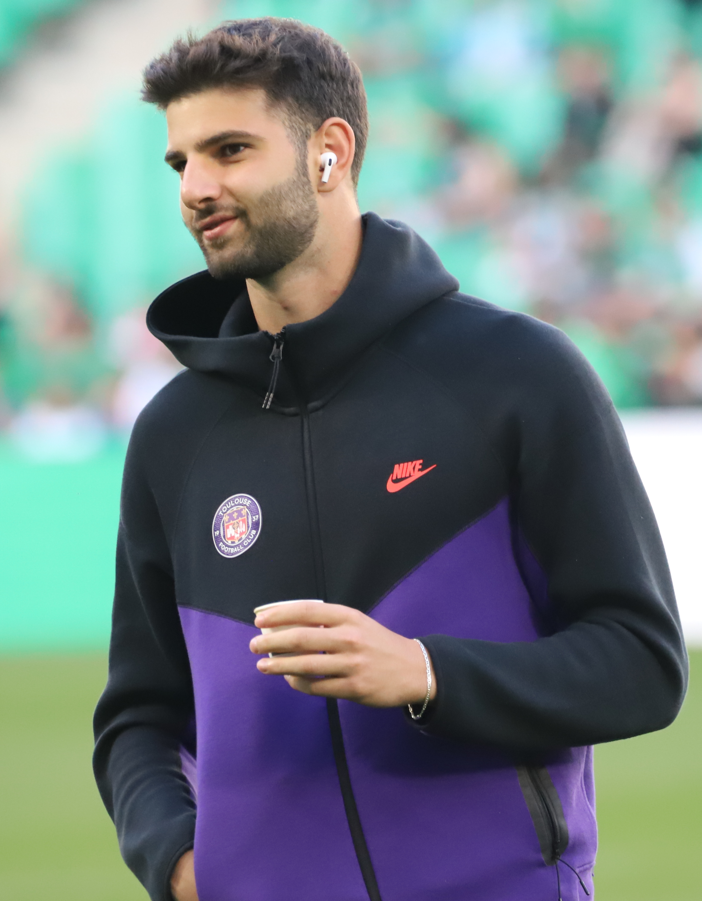
- Akdağ with Toulouse in 2025

Personal information
- Full name: Ümit Akdağ
- Date of birth: 6 October 2003 (age 23)
- Place of birth: Bucharest, Romania
- Height: 1.92 m (6 ft 4 in)
- Position: Centre-back

Team information
- Current team: Beşiktaş
- Number: 50

Youth career
- 2011–2015: Steaua București
- 2015–2017: Chelsea
- 2017–2023: Alanyaspor

Senior career*
Years	Team	Apps	(Gls)
2022–2026	Alanyaspor	34	(1)
2023–2024	→ Göztepe (loan)	25	(3)
2024–2025	→ Toulouse (loan)	9	(0)
2026–	Beşiktaş	1	(0)

International career^{‡}
2023–2025	Romania U21	10	(2)
- * Club domestic league appearances and goals as of 22 November 2026 ‡ National team caps and goals as of 17 June 2025

Ümit Akdağ (born 6 October 2003) is a professional footballer who plays as a centre-back for Süper Lig club Beşiktaş.

== Club career ==
=== Alanyaspor ===
After representing Steaua București and Chelsea at youth level, Akdağ moved to Turkish club Alanyaspor in 2017. He made his professional debut for the latter on 3 June 2023, coming on as a 46th-minute substitute for Umut Güneş in a 5–1 away Süper Lig loss to Trabzonspor.

==== Loan to Göztepe ====
During the 2023–24 season, Akdağ was loaned out to TFF First League team Göztepe. He recorded his debut in a goalless draw at Ümraniyespor on 19 August 2023, and on 21 October scored his first senior goal in a 3–0 home win over Şanlıurfaspor.

Akdağ contributed with three goals from 25 appearances in the second tier championship, as Göztepe finished as runners-up and promoted to the Süper Lig.

==== Loan to Toulouse ====
On 23 August 2024, Akdağ joined French club Toulouse on loan. He made his Ligue 1 debut on 22 September 2024, starting in a 2–0 away loss to Brest.

=== Beşiktaş ===
On 2 September 2026, Akdağ joined Beşiktaş on a four-year deal.

== International career ==
In November 2023, Akdağ was called up by head coach Daniel Pancu to the Romania under-21 national team for the matches against Albania and Switzerland in the 2025 UEFA European Championship qualifiers. He made his debut on the 17th, coming on as 71st-minute substitute for Cătălin Vulturar in a 5–0 victory against the former opponent.

On 15 October 2024, Akdağ scored in a 3–1 home win over Switzerland, which secured Romania first place in its group and qualified it for its fourth consecutive European Under-21 Championship.

== Personal life ==
Ümit was born in Bucharest, Romania, to parents of Turkish ethnicity.

== Career statistics ==
As of match played 30 August 2026

Appearances and goals by club, season and competition
Club	Season	League			National cup (Note: Includes Turkish Cup, Coupe de France)		Europe		Other		Total	
Club	Season	Division	Apps	Goals	Apps	Goals	Apps	Goals	Apps	Goals	Apps	Goals
Alanyaspor	2022–23	Süper Lig	1	0	0	0	—		—		1	0
Alanyaspor	2025–26	Süper Lig	30	1	5	0	—		—		35	1
Alanyaspor	2026–27	Süper Lig	3	0	0	0	—		—		3	0
Alanyaspor	Total		34	1	5	0	—		—		39	1
Göztepe (loan)	2023–24	TFF 1. Lig	25	3	2	0	—		—		27	3
Toulouse (loan)	2024–25	Ligue 1	9	0	3	0	—		—		12	0
Career total			68	4	10	0	0	0	0	0	78	4
