= Eric Ndizeye =

Burundian footballer

Personal information
- Date of birth: 23 August 1999 (age 27)
- Place of birth: Nyamugari, Gitega Province, Burundi
- Height: 1.87 m (6 ft 2 in)
- Position: Defender

Senior career*
Years	Team	Apps	(Gls)
2018–2021	Musongati FC		
2021–2022	Yeni Malatyaspor	2	(0)

International career
2019–	Burundi	10	(0)
- * Club domestic league appearances and goals as of 21 May 2022

Eric Ndizeye (born 23 August 1999) is a Burundian footballer who plays as a defender.

== Career ==
Ndizeye started his career with Burundian side Musongati FC.

Before the second half of the 2020–21 season, he signed for Yeni Malatyaspor in the Turkish top flight. On 8 April 2021, Ndizeye debuted for Yeni Malatyaspor during a 1–1 draw with Fenerbahçe.
