= Altay–Göztepe derby =

Football match

Altay-Göztepe derby
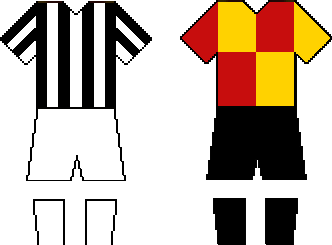
- Location: İzmir, Turkey
- Teams: Altay; Göztepe
- Latest meeting: Göztepe 4–0 Altay (3 February 2024)
- Next meeting: Unknown
- Stadiums: Gürsel Aksel Stadium; Alsancak Stadium

Statistics
- Most wins: Altay (27)
- Largest victory: Altay 6–2 Göztepe; Göztepe 4–0 Altay

The Altay–Göztepe derby refers to the football matches played between the two clubs in İzmir. Altay plays its home matches at the Alsancak Mustafa Denizli Stadium in Alsancak, whilst Göztepe’s home matches are hosted at the Gürsel Aksel Stadium in Güzelyalı.

== History ==
The first officially recognized professional match between the two clubs took place on 29 November 1959, resulting in a 3–1 victory for Göztepe. In the 79 official meetings since then, Altay has historically held the upper hand with 34 wins, compared to 16 for Göztepe and 29 draws.

Altay also maintains a significant scoring lead with a 31-goal advantage and famously held an unbeaten run against Göztepe for 34 years, spanning from 24 February 1980 to 1 October 2014. While Altay secured a 2–1 win as recently as 17 September 2021, Göztepe claimed their most recent victory with 4–0 win at home on 3 February 2024.

=== 2022 match abandonment ===
The 27 November 2022 TFF First League match between the two teams, played at Göztepe's Gürsel Aksel Stadium was initially halted in the 19th minute when pyrotechnics and fireworks were launched from the Altay away supporters' section into the Göztepe home stands. The debris struck several home spectators, severely injuring one fan who required emergency medical attention on the pitch and was subsequently evacuated by ambulance.

During the stoppage in play, as players and medical staff gathered near the touchline, a Göztepe supporter breached stadium security and ran onto the pitch. The invader removed a corner flag and attacked Altay goalkeeper Ozan Evrim Özenç from behind, striking him twice over the head and shoulders. The wooden shaft of the corner flag shattered upon impact. The goalkeeper was injured and required hospitalization, while security personnel and players subdued the attacker. Following a consultation with security officials and representatives from both clubs, the referee abandoned the match. Both teams were handed a 3-0 defeat and ordered to play several matches behind closed doors. Effectively, neither team earned points from the fixture.

Özenç suffered a 4cm opening in his head and was hospitalized, though he was released the following day. The fan struck by the flare underwent multiple surgeries for facial reconstruction. Following the incident, 21 individuals were detained. Nihat Aydın, the pitch invader, was charged with "attempted murder," and several Altay fans faced charges for smuggling pyrotechnics into the stadium via private ambulance drivers. Furkan Ersanlı, the supporter who launched the fireworks, was sentenced to 15 years in prison in May 2024. The İzmir 3rd High Criminal Court convicted him of "intentional injury with a weapon," "smuggling prohibited substances," and "disrupting a sporting event." The remaining 20 individuals involved in the incident were released on probation.

== Honours ==
Competition	Altay	Göztepe
Turkish Cup	2	2
Turkish Super Cup	0	1
Turkish Football Championship	0	1
İzmir Football League	14	5
TSYD İzmir Cup	18	9
Total	34	18

== Matches (post 1959) ==
Altay-Göztepe
Date	Tournament	Home	Score	Away
29-11-1959	Süper Lig	Göztepe	3–1	Altay
02-04-1960	Süper Lig	Altay	4–2	Göztepe
18-09-1960	Süper Lig	Altay	2–2	Göztepe
21-05-1961	Süper Lig	Göztepe	1–0	Altay
04-11-1961	Süper Lig	Göztepe	0–2	Altay
27-05-1962	Süper Lig	Altay	2–1	Göztepe
09-09-1962	Süper Lig	Göztepe	2–1	Altay
05-01-1963	Süper Lig	Göztepe	0–0	Altay
16-11-1963	Süper Lig	Göztepe	1–0	Altay
16-02-1964	Süper Lig	Altay	2–0	Göztepe
06-09-1964	Süper Lig	Göztepe	1–0	Altay
30-01-1965	Süper Lig	Altay	0–1	Göztepe
18-09-1965	Süper Lig	Göztepe	3–2	Altay
28-01-1966	Süper Lig	Altay	2–0	Göztepe
04-12-1966	Süper Lig	Altay	2–1	Göztepe
23-04-1967	Süper Lig	Göztepe	0–0	Altay
25-06-1967	Türkiye Kupası	Altay	2–2	Göztepe
17-09-1967	Süper Lig	Göztepe	0–0	Altay
11-02-1968	Süper Lig	Altay	2–0	Göztepe
21-09-1968	Süper Lig	Altay	1–0	Göztepe
22-02-1969	Süper Lig	Göztepe	0–0	Altay
21-09-1969	Süper Lig	Altay	1–0	Göztepe
21-02-1970	Süper Lig	Göztepe	1–0	Altay
11-10-1970	Süper Lig	Göztepe	0–0	Altay
06-03-1971	Süper Lig	Altay	2–0	Göztepe
04-09-1971	Süper Lig	Altay	0–0	Göztepe
05-03-1972	Süper Lig	Göztepe	0–1	Altay
05-11-1972	Süper Lig	Göztepe	1–0	Altay
01-04-1973	Süper Lig	Altay	2–0	Göztepe
23-09-1973	Süper Lig	Altay	1–2	Göztepe
24-02-1974	Süper Lig	Göztepe	1–1	Altay
27-10-1974	Süper Lig	Altay	1–1	Göztepe
23-03-1975	Süper Lig	Göztepe	1–1	Altay
21-09-1975	Süper Lig	Altay	1–1	Göztepe
29-02-1976	Süper Lig	Göztepe	0–0	Altay
12-09-1976	Süper Lig	Altay	1–0	Göztepe
20-02-1977	Süper Lig	Göztepe	1–1	Altay
27-08-1978	Süper Lig	Altay	1–1	Göztepe
11-02-1979	Süper Lig	Göztepe	1–0	Altay
09-09-1979	Süper Lig	Altay	1–3	Göztepe
24-02-1980	Süper Lig	Göztepe	0–0	Altay
18-10-1981	Süper Lig	Göztepe	1–1	Altay
04-04-1982	Süper Lig	Altay	2–0	Göztepe
11-11-1990	2. Futbol Ligi B	Altay	2–1	Göztepe
14-04-1991	2. Futbol Ligi B	Göztepe	2–2	Altay
13-08-1999	Süper Lig	Altay	0–0	Göztepe
06-02-2000	Süper Lig	Göztepe	0–1	Altay
17-09-2000	2. Klasman	Altay	3–1	Göztepe
12-11-2000	2. Klasman	Göztepe	0–0	Altay
04-02-2001	2. Klasman	Altay	1–0	Göztepe
07-04-2001	2. Klasman	Göztepe	1–2	Altay
18-08-2002	Süper Lig	Altay	4–2	Göztepe
08-02-2003	Süper Lig	Göztepe	0–2	Altay
08-11-2003	1.Lig	Göztepe	1–1	Altay
12-11-2003	Türkiye Kupası	Altay	1–0	Göztepe
11-04-2004	1.Lig	Altay	6–2	Göztepe
01-10-2014	2.Lig	Göztepe	3–0	Altay
18-02-2015	2.Lig	Altay	2–2	Göztepe
17-09-2021	Süper Lig	Altay	2–1	Göztepe
06-02-2022	Süper Lig	Göztepe	0–2	Altay
27-11-2022	1.Lig	Göztepe	abnd.	Altay
23-04-2023	1.Lig	Altay	2–2	Göztepe
03-09-2023	1.Lig	Altay	0–1	Göztepe
04-02-2024	1.Lig	Göztepe	4–0	Altay
