= Anthony Dennis =

Nigerian footballer

Personal information
- Full name: Anthony Junior Dennis
- Date of birth: 21 June 2004 (age 22)
- Place of birth: Kaduna, Nigeria
- Height: 1.79 m (5 ft 10 in)
- Position: Midfielder

Team information
- Current team: Al Jazira
- Number: 30

Youth career
- HB Academy Abuja
- 2023–2024: Göztepe

Senior career*
Years	Team	Apps	(Gls)
2024–2026	Göztepe	78	(4)
2026–	Al Jazira	3	(0)
- * Club domestic league appearances and goals as of 18 October 2026

Anthony Junior Dennis (born 21 June 2004) is a Nigerian professional footballer who plays as a midfielder for the UAE Pro League club Al Jazira.

== Club career ==
Dennis is a youth product of the HB Academy in Abuja, Nigeria. In January 2023, he joined the youth academy of the Turkish club Göztepe and was part of their U19 team. He made his senior and professional debut with Göztepe in a 1–1 TFF First League tie with Çorum on 27 January 2024, and was thereafter promoted to Göztepe's senior side. On 22 May 2024, he extended his contract with Göztepe until 2027 after helping the club earn promotion to the Süper Lig for the 2024–25 season.

== Career statistics ==
=== Club ===
As of match played 21 December 2025

Appearances and goals by club, season and competition
Club	Season	League			Turkish Cup		Total	
Club	Season	Division	Apps	Goals	Apps	Goals	Apps	Goals
Göztepe	2022-23	TFF First League	0	0	0	0	0	0
Göztepe	2023-24	TFF First League	15	1	0	0	15	1
Göztepe	2024-25	Süper Lig	32	0	5	0	37	0
Göztepe	2025-26	Süper Lig	16	3	0	0	16	3
Career total			63	4	5	0	68	4
