= Cihat Arslan =

Turkish footballer and manager (born 1970)

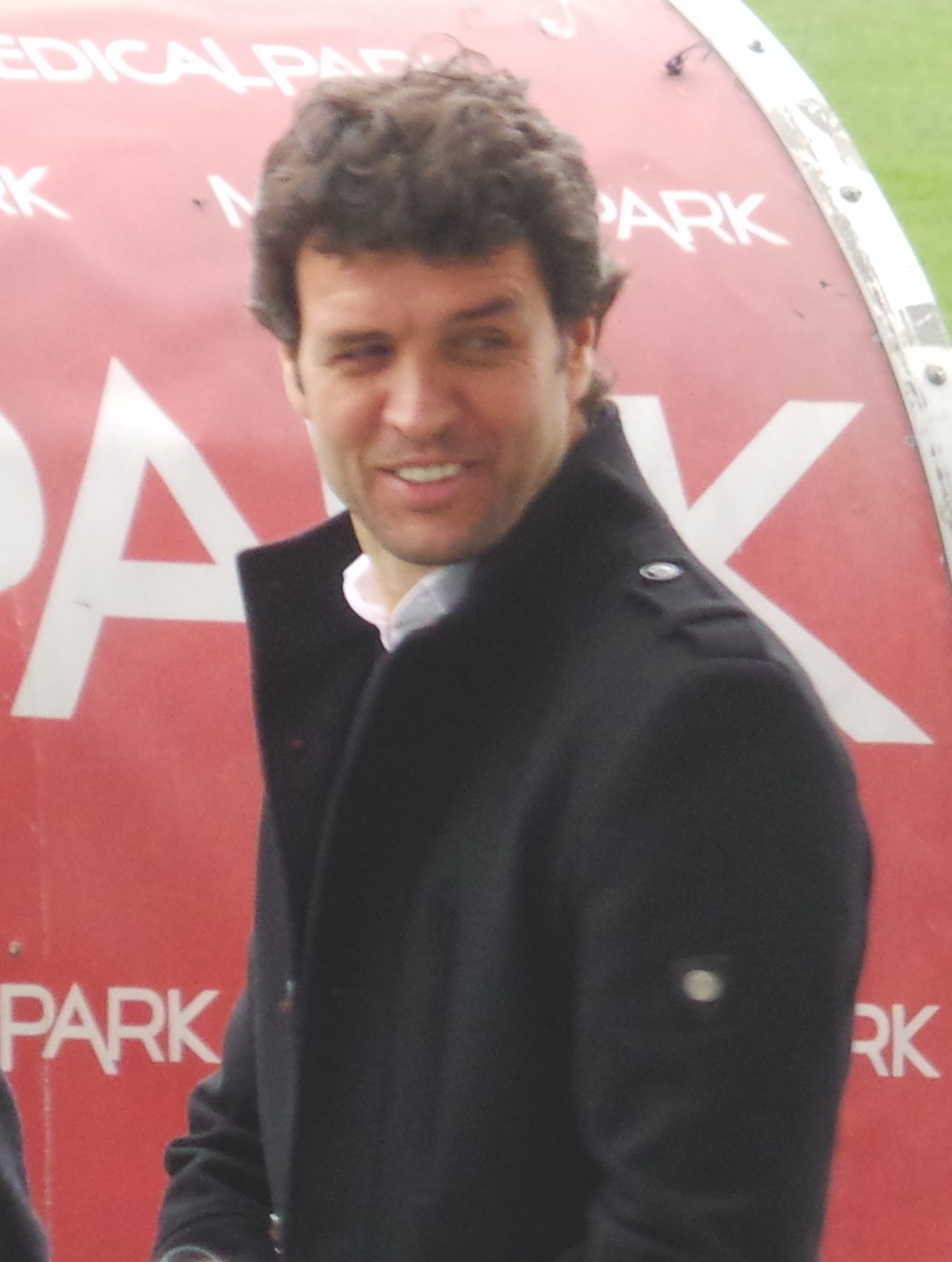
- Arslan as İstanbul B.B. manager in 2013

Personal information
- Date of birth: 9 February 1970 (age 56)
- Place of birth: Balıkesir, Turkey
- Height: 1.92 m (6 ft 4 in)
- Position: Defender

Team information
- Current team: Şanlıurfaspor (head coach)

Senior career*
| Years | Team | Apps | (Gls) |
- Gömeçspor
- Ayvalıkgücü Belediyespor
| 1990–1993 | Karşıyaka | 61 | (3) |
| 1993–1997 | Galatasaray | 8 | (0) |
| 1994–1995 | → Denizlispor (loan) | 24 | (0) |
| 1995–1996 | → Eskişehirspor (loan) | 27 | (1) |
| 1996–1997 | → Zeytinburnuspor (loan) | 20 | (1) |
| 1997–1998 | Gaziantepspor | 20 | (0) |
| 1998–2002 | Yozgatspor | 110 | (11) |
| 2002–2003 | Kayserispor | 29 | (4) |
| 2003–2004 | Kocaelispor | 29 | (4) |
| 2004–2005 | İstanbul B.B. | 29 | (1) |
| 2005–2008 | Kasımpaşa | 77 | (4) |

International career
| 1991 | Turkey U21 | 3 | (0) |

Managerial career
- 2008–2009: Kasımpaşa (assistant)
- 2010: Kocaelispor
- 2010: Eyüpspor
- 2011: Boluspor
- 2011–2012: Göztepe
- 2012–2013: Karşıyaka
- 2013–2014: İstanbul B.B.
- 2014–2015: Şanlıurfaspor
- 2015: Balıkesirspor
- 2015–2016: Akhisarspor
- 2018: Karşıyaka
- 2018: Adanaspor
- 2018–2019: Akhisarspor
- 2019: Čelik Zenica
- 2020: Manisa FK
- 2020–2021: Balıkesirspor
- 2021: Kasımpaşa
- 2022: Yeni Malatyaspor
- 2023: Shkupi
- 2024: Ankaragücü
- 2025: Şanlıurfaspor
- 2025–: Şanlıurfaspor
- * Club domestic league appearances and goals

Cihat Arslan (Džihad Redžović, born 9 February 1970) is a Turkish football manager and former player who is the head coach of TFF 2. Lig club Şanlıurfaspor. He is of Bosniak descent and his family roots came from Sandžak.

== Managerial career ==
In December 2015, Arslan was named manager of Süper Lig side Akhisarspor in the 2015–16 season. He was sacked on 1 September 2016, but was once again Akhisarspor manager from 2018 to 2019.

In February 2019, he became the new manager of Bosnian Premier League club Čelik Zenica. After the end of the 2018–19 Bosnian Premier League, Arslan decided to leave Čelik.

In February 2020, he became the new manager of TFF Second League club Manisa.

== Honours ==
=== Player ===
Galatasaray

- Süper Lig: 1993–94
- Süper Kupa: 1993

Yozgatspor

- TFF First League: 1999–00

Kasımpaşa

- 2. Liga: 2005–06

=== Manager ===
İstanbul B.B.

- TFF First League: 2013–14
