= Taha Altıkardeş =

Turkish association football player

Personal information
- Date of birth: 22 August 2003 (age 23)
- Place of birth: Osmangazi, Turkey
- Height: 1.90 m (6 ft 3 in)
- Position: Centre-back

Team information
- Current team: Göztepe
- Number: 4

Youth career
- 2013–2015: Bursa Ufukspor
- 2015–2021: Bursaspor

Senior career*
| Years | Team | Apps | (Gls) |
| 2021–2022 | Bursaspor | 26 | (0) |
| 2022–2023 | Trabzonspor | 3 | (0) |
| 2023– | Göztepe | 82 | (6) |

International career^{‡}
| 2021–2022 | Turkey U19 | 7 | (0) |
| 2022– | Turkey U21 | 8 | (0) |
- * Club domestic league appearances and goals as of 10 June 2026 ‡ National team caps and goals as of 13:49, 11 October 2024 (UTC)

Taha Altıkardeş (born 22 August 2003) is a Turkish footballer who plays as a centre-back for Süper Lig club Göztepe.

== Club career ==
Altıkardeş is a youth product of Bursa Ufukspor and Bursaspor. On 28 January 2021, he signed his first professional contract with Bursaspor until 2023, and was promoted to their first team in the TFF First League. On 31 July 2021, he extended his contract with the club until 2025. On 22 January 2022, he transferred to Trabzonspor. He made his professional debut with Trabzonspor in a 4–2 Süper Lig win over Giresunspor on 30 May 2023. On 30 June 2023, he transferred to Göztepe on a free transfer for 3+1 Seasons. He was part of an exchange alongside Southampton for Mislav Oršić - Göztepe, and Southampton are part of the same ownership group.

== International career ==
Altıkardeş is a youth international for Turkey, having played up to the Turkey U21s since 2022.
