= 2020–21 Trabzonspor season =

Trabzonspor
2020–21 season
- President: Ahmet Ağaoğlu
- Head coach: Eddie Newton (until 31 October 2020); Abdullah Avcı (from 10 November 2020)
- Stadium: Medical Park Stadyumu
- Süper Lig: 4th
- Turkish Cup: Fifth round
- Turkish Super Cup: Winners
- Top goalscorer: League: Caleb Ekuban (10); All: Caleb Ekuban (11)
Home colours	Away colours	Third colours

The 2020–21 Trabzonspor season was the club's 53rd season in existence, all of which have been in the top flight of Turkish football. In addition to the domestic league, Trabzonspor participated in this season's edition of the Turkish Cup. Trabzonspor did not complete in any UEFA club competitions, having been banned by the UEFA Club Financial Control Body on 3 June 2020 due to breaches of the UEFA Financial Fair Play Regulations.

== Players ==
=== Current squad ===
As of 31 January 2021

Note: Flags indicate national team as defined under FIFA eligibility rules; some limited exceptions apply. Players may hold more than one non-FIFA nationality.

No.	Pos.	Nation	Player
1	GK	TUR	Uğurcan Çakır
2	MF	TUR	Berat Özdemir
3	DF	BRA	Marlon (on loan from Fluminense)
4	DF	TUR	Hüseyin Türkmen
5	DF	IRN	Majid Hosseini
7	MF	TUR	Yusuf Sarı
8	MF	ENG	Lewis Baker (on loan from Chelsea)
9	FW	NGA	Anthony Nwakaeme
10	MF	TUR	Abdülkadir Ömür
11	MF	GRE	Anastasios Bakasetas
13	DF	BRA	Vitor Hugo
15	MF	NOR	Anders Trondsen
16	GK	TUR	Erce Kardeşler

No.	Pos.	Nation	Player
18	FW	GHA	Caleb Ekuban
19	MF	TUR	Safa Kınalı
21	FW	CPV	Djaniny
23	DF	TUR	Kamil Çörekçi
24	MF	BRA	Flávio
29	MF	TUR	Yunus Mallı
32	DF	POR	Edgar Ié
39	DF	TUR	Atakan Gündüz
59	GK	TUR	Arda Akbulut
61	MF	TUR	Abdülkadir Parmak
79	FW	COD	Benik Afobe (on loan from Stoke City)
99	DF	TUR	Serkan Asan

=== Intaken youth players ===
Note: Flags indicate national team as defined under FIFA eligibility rules; some limited exceptions apply. Players may hold more than one non-FIFA nationality.

No.	Pos.	Nation	Player
14	MF	TUR	Hakan Yeşil
70	DF	TUR	Ahmetcan Kaplan
71	MF	TUR	Süleyman Cebeci
75	DF	TUR	Faruk Can Genç

No.	Pos.	Nation	Player
83	GK	TUR	Hakan Aydın
84	GK	TUR	Adem Ağaoğlu
98	GK	TUR	Kağan Moradaoğlu
99	FW	TUR	Muhammet Akpınar

=== Out on loan ===
Note: Flags indicate national team as defined under FIFA eligibility rules; some limited exceptions apply. Players may hold more than one non-FIFA nationality.

No.	Pos.	Nation	Player
14	MF	AZE	Murat Cem Akpınar (at Kocaelispor until 30 June 2021)
17	FW	MLI	Fousseni Diabaté (at Göztepe until 30 June 2021)
20	FW	TUR	Anıl Başaran (at Bandırmaspor until 30 June 2021)
22	DF	ARG	Gastón Campi (at Fatih Karagümrük until 30 June 2021)
28	FW	TUR	Salih Kavrazlı (at Hekimoğlu Trabzon until 30 June 2021)
33	DF	TUR	Abdurrahim Dursun (at Bandırmaspor until 30 June 2021)
38	MF	TUR	Ahmet Canbaz (at Ümraniyespor until 30 June 2021)
45	FW	TUR	Ahmet Hakan Sevinç (at Yomraspor until 30 June 2021)
46	DF	TUR	Ali Osman Karnapoğlu (at Pazarspor until 30 June 2021)
51	MF	TUR	Behlül Aydın (at Pendikspor until 30 June 2021)
54	GK	TUR	Muhammet Taha Tepe (at Turgutluspor until 30 June 2021)
66	MF	TUR	Tunahan Ergül (at İçel İdmanyurdu until 30 June 2021)
66	MF	TUR	Taha Tunç (at Hekimoğlu Trabzon until 30 June 2021)

No.	Pos.	Nation	Player
67	FW	TUR	Koray Kılınç (at İstanbulspor until 30 June 2021)
77	MF	TUR	Kerem Baykuş (at İstanbulspor until 30 June 2021)
90	MF	AZE	Ebrar Cumur (at İstanbulspor until 30 June 2022)
99	DF	TUR	Sami Can Özkan (at Adıyaman 1954 Spor until 30 June 2021)
—	DF	TUR	Ahmet Baha Bilgin (at Yomraspor until 30 June 2021)
—	MF	TUR	Ahmet Eren (at Nevşehir Belediyespor until 30 June 2021)
—	FW	TUR	Doğukan Delimehmet (at Çankaya FK until 30 June 2021)
—	FW	TUR	Furkan Tütüncü (at Çankaya FK until 30 June 2021)
—	MF	TUR	Hüseyin Mert Kurt (at 1954 Kelkit Belediyespor until 30 June 2021)
—	FW	TUR	İsmail Cem Kara (at Şanlıurfaspor until 30 June 2021)
—	MF	TUR	Mert Kurt (at Çankaya FK until 30 June 2021)
—	FW	TUR	Talha Reşat Bulut (at Erbaaspor until 30 June 2021)
—	DF	TUR	İsmail Karakaş (at Çankaya FK until 30 June 2021)

=== Signed during the season ===
Note: Flags indicate national team as defined under FIFA eligibility rules; some limited exceptions apply. Players may hold more than one non-FIFA nationality.

No.	Pos.	Nation	Player
2	MF	TUR	Berat Özdemir (signed from Gençlerbirliği)
11	MF	GRE	Anastasios Bakasetas (signed from Alanyaspor)
29	MF	TUR	Yunus Mallı (signed from Wolfsburg)

=== Left during the season ===
Note: Flags indicate national team as defined under FIFA eligibility rules; some limited exceptions apply. Players may hold more than one non-FIFA nationality.

No.	Pos.	Nation	Player
6	MF	BRA	Guilherme (loan terminated)
17	FW	MLI	Fousseni Diabaté (loaned to Göztepe)
22	DF	ARG	Gastón Campi (loaned to Fatih Karagümrük)
28	FW	TUR	Salih Kavrazlı (loaned to Hekimoğlu Trabzon)

No.	Pos.	Nation	Player
38	MF	TUR	Ahmet Canbaz (loaned to Ümraniyespor)
45	FW	TUR	Bilal Başaçıkoğlu (released)
47	DF	POR	João Pereira (released)
52	FW	ECU	Stiven Plaza (loan terminated)

== Competitions ==
=== Süper Lig ===
==== League table ====
Pos	Team	Pld	W	D	L	GF	GA	GD	Pts	Qualification or relegation
2	Galatasaray	40	26	6	8	80	36	+44	84	Qualification for the Champions League second qualifying round
3	Fenerbahçe	40	25	7	8	72	41	+31	82	Qualification for the Europa League play-off round
4	Trabzonspor	40	19	14	7	50	37	+13	71	Qualification for the Europa Conference League third qualifying round
5	Sivasspor	40	16	17	7	54	43	+11	65	Qualification for the Europa Conference League second qualifying round
6	Hatayspor	40	17	10	13	62	53	+9	61	

Source: Süper Lig, Soccerway
Rules for classification: 1) Points; 2) Head-to-head points; 3) Head-to-head goal difference; 4) Head-to-head goals scored; 5) Goal difference; 6) Goals scored; 7) Play-off.

==== Results summary ====
Overall								Home						Away					
Pld	W	D	L	GF	GA	GD	Pts	W	D	L	GF	GA	GD	W	D	L	GF	GA	GD
40	19	14	7	50	37	+13	71	11	3	6	30	24	+6	8	11	1	20	13	+7

Last updated: 15 May 2021.
Source: Soccerway

==== Results by matchday ====
Round	1	2	3	4	5	6	7	8	9	10	11	12	13	14	15	16	17	18	19	20	21	22	23	24	25	26	27	28	29	30	31	32	33	34	35	36	37	38	39	40	41	42
Ground	H	A	H	A	H	A	H	A	H	A	H	A	H	A	H	A	H	B	A	H	A	A	H	A	H	A	H	A	H	A	H	A	H	A	H	A	H	A	B	H	A	H
Result	L	D	W	D	L	L	L	D	W	W	D	D	W	W	L	W	W	X	D	W	W	W	W	W	W	W	L	W	L	D	W	D	D	D	D	D	W	D	X	W	D	W
Position	16	15	10	12	14	18	19	17	15	14	13	14	11	9	9	7	7	7	8	7	6	5	4	4	4	4	4	4	4	4	4	4	4	4	4	4	4	4	4	4	4	4

Updated to match(es) played on 15 May 2021. Source: Soccerway
A = Away; H = Home; B = Bye; W = Win; D = Draw; L = Loss; X = Bye

==== Matches ====
Note for matches with missing attendance numbers: It was concluded that matches would be played behind closed doors in the stadiums in Süper Lig for the first half of the season due to the coronavirus pandemic. This decision was altered before matchday 5 to allow spectators only into skyboxes with half capacity.

13 September 2020 1	Trabzonspor	1–3	Beşiktaş	Trabzon
20:00	Kamil Çörekçi (yellow card) 36'; Flávio (yellow card) 43' (yellow-red card) 62'; Abdülkadir Ömür 86'	Report	Tyler Boyd 29'; Fabrice N'Sakala (yellow card) 34'; Welinton (yellow card) 39'; Bernard Mensah 63' (pen.); Jeremain Lens 74'	Stadium: Şenol Güneş Stadium; Attendance: 0 Referee: Ali Şansalan; Assistant referees: Mustafa Emre Eyisoy, Serkan Olguncan; Fourth official: Mustafa Öğretmenoğlu

19 September 2020 2	Denizlispor	0–0	Trabzonspor	Denizli
16:00	Marvin Bakalorz (yellow card) 19'; Hadi Sacko (yellow card) 67' (yellow-red card) 68'	Report		Stadium: Denizli Atatürk Stadium; Attendance: 0 Referee: Volkan Bayarslan; Assistant referees: Süleyman Özay, Deniz Caner Özaral; Fourth official: Burak Şeker

26 September 2020 3	Trabzonspor	3–1	Yeni Malatyaspor	Trabzon
19:00	Benik Afobe 24', 33'; Anthony Nwakaeme 45+3'; Lewis Baker (yellow card) 90+4'	Report	Adem Büyük 78' (pen.) (yellow card) 90+4'; Fernando Zuqui (yellow card) 80'; Benjamin Tetteh (yellow card) 90+4'	Stadium: Şenol Güneş Stadium; Attendance: 0 Referee: Özgür Yankaya; Assistant referees: Esat Sancaktar, İlker Takpak; Fourth official: Alper Çetin

2 October 2020 4	Gaziantep	1–1	Trabzonspor	Gaziantep
20:00	Oğuz Ceylan (yellow card) 45+4'; Alexandru Maxim (yellow card) 50' (goal) 90+3' (pen.); Júnior Morais (yellow card) 62'; Zvonimir Kožulj (yellow card) 68'	Report	Gastón Campi 64'; Flávio (yellow card) 72' (yellow-red card) 90'	Stadium: Kalyon Stadium; Attendance: 0 Referee: Fırat Aydınus; Assistant referees: Erdem Bayık, Hakan Yemişken; Fourth official: Kutluhan Bilgiç

17 October 2020 5	Trabzonspor	0–2	Başakşehir	Trabzon
19:00	Safa Kınalı (yellow card) 52'	Report	İrfan Kahveci 32'; Edin Višća 54'; Boli Bolingoli (yellow card) 55'	Stadium: Şenol Güneş Stadium; Attendance: 0 Referee: Bahattin Şimşek; Assistant referees: Mustafa Sönmez, Osman Gökhan Bilir; Fourth official: Hakan Ceylan

25 October 2020 6	Fenerbahçe	3–1	Trabzonspor	Istanbul
18:00	Luiz Gustavo (yellow card) 44'; Dimitrios Pelkas (yellow card) 47'; Serkan Asan 51' (o.g.); Enner Valencia 55'; Papiss Cissé 72'	Report	Benik Afobe 23'; Serkan Asan (yellow card) 77'	Stadium: Şükrü Saracoğlu Stadium; Attendance: 0 Referee: Cüneyt Çakır; Assistant referees: Bahattin Duran, Tarık Ongun; Fourth official: Tugay Kaan Numanoğlu

30 October 2020 7	Trabzonspor	3–4	Kasımpaşa	Trabzon
20:00	Serkan Asan 23'; Anthony Nwakaeme 31', 38' (yellow card) 90+2'; Djaniny (yellow card) 86'	Report	Mickaël Tirpan 8'; Yusuf Erdoğan 41'; Aytaç Kara (penalty missed) 58'; Bengali-Fodé Koita (yellow card) 86' (goal) 90+3'; Edgar Ié 87' (o.g.); Vitor Hugo (yellow card) 90+3'	Stadium: Şenol Güneş Stadium; Attendance: 0 Referee: Tugay Kaan Numanoğlu; Assistant referees: İsmail Şencan, Mustafa Savranlar; Fourth official: Direnç Tonusluoğlu

7 November 2020 8	Alanyaspor	1–1	Trabzonspor	Antalya
16:00	Steven Caulker 49'; Davidson (yellow card) 52'; Berkan Kutlu (yellow card) 90+3'	Report	Serkan Asan (yellow card) 28'; Vitor Hugo (yellow card) 49'; Steven Caulker 59' (o.g.)	Stadium: Bahçeşehir Okulları Stadium; Attendance: 0 Referee: Ali Palabıyık; Assistant referees: Serkan Çimen, İlker Takpak; Fourth official: Kadir Sağlam

22 November 2020 9	Trabzonspor	1–0	Erzurumspor	Trabzon
19:00	Caleb Ekuban 23'; Benik Afobe (yellow card) 50'; Lewis Baker (yellow card) 77'	Report	Murat Uçar (yellow card) 11'; Arturo Mina (yellow card) 20'; Kayacan Erdoğan (yellow card) 64'	Stadium: Şenol Güneş Stadium; Attendance: 0 Referee: Erkan Özdamar; Assistant referees: Serkan Olguncan, Kamil Çetin; Fourth official: Alper Çetin

27 November 2020 10	Ankaragücü	0–1	Trabzonspor	Ankara
19:30	Zvonimir Šarlija (yellow card) 5'; Stelios Kitsiou (yellow card) 21'	Report	Lewis Baker 45+1'; João Pereira (yellow card) 71' (yellow-red card) 90'; Uğurcan Çakır (yellow card) 81'; Djaniny (yellow card) 90+3'	Stadium: Eryaman Stadium; Attendance: 0 Referee: Mustafa Öğretmenoğlyu; Assistant referees: Mustafa Emre Eyisoy, Murat Ergin Gözütok; Fourth official: Caner Ak

7 December 2020 11	Trabzonspor	1–1	Sivasspor	Trabzon
19:30	Caleb Ekuban 45'	Report	Hakan Arslan 76'; Faycal Fajr (yellow card) 83'	Stadium: Şenol Güneş Stadium; Attendance: 0 Referee: Suat Arslanboğa; Assistant referees: Alpaslan Dedeş, Yusuf Bozdoğan; Fourth official: Burak Pakkan

12 December 2020 12	Kayserispor	0–0	Trabzonspor	Kayseri
16:00		Report	João Pereira (yellow card) 10'; Bilal Başaçıkoğlu (yellow card) 57'; Abdülkadir Parmak (yellow card) 57'	Stadium: Kadir Has Stadium; Attendance: 0 Referee: Burak Şeker; Assistant referees: Volkan Ahmet Narinç, Bilal Gölen; Fourth official: Kadir Sağlam

19 December 2020 13	Trabzonspor	2–1	Çaykur Rizespor	Trabzon
16:00	Caleb Ekuban 53' (pen.); Djaniny 65'; Kamil Çörekçi (yellow card) 90+3'	Report	Godfred Donsah (yellow card) 14'; Milan Škoda 36' (pen.); Tunay Torun (yellow card) 46'; Fernando Andrade (yellow card) 55'; Emir Dilaver (yellow card) 76'	Stadium: Şenol Güneş Stadium; Attendance: 0 Referee: Ali Şansalan; Assistant referees: Kemal Yılmaz, Ali Saygın Ögel; Fourth official: Onur Özütoprak

22 December 2020 14	Hatayspor	0–1	Trabzonspor	Antakya
16:00	Munir (yellow card) 65'	Report	Vitor Hugo 74'; Edgar Ié (yellow card) 90+4'	Stadium: Antakya Atatürk Stadium; Attendance: 0 Referee: Abdulkadir Bitigen; Assistant referees: Serkan Olguncan, Mustafa Savranlar; Fourth official: Cihan Aydın

26 December 2020 15	Trabzonspor	0–2	Galatasaray	Trabzon
19:00	Flávio (yellow card) 35'; Abdülkadir Parmak (yellow card) 41'	Report	Taylan Antalyalı (yellow card) 14'; Omar Elabdellaoui (yellow card) 24'; Arda Turan 44'; Oğulcan Çağlayan 55'; Ömer Bayram (yellow card) 75'	Stadium: Şenol Güneş Stadium; Attendance: 0 Referee: Halil Umut Meler; Assistant referees: Mustafa Emre Eyisoy, İlker Takpak; Fourth official: Koray Gençerler

3 January 2021 16	Fatih Karagümrük	1–2	Trabzonspor	Istanbul
16:00	Jure Balkovec (yellow card) 48' (goal) 70'; Vato Arveladze (yellow card) 57'	Report	Majid Hosseini (yellow card) 13'; Abdülkadir Parmak (yellow card) 37'; Anthony Nwakaeme 46'; Marlon (yellow card) 59'; Caleb Ekuban 81'; Lewis Baker (yellow card) 90'	Stadium: Vodafone Park; Attendance: 0 Referee: Ali Palabıyık; Assistant referees: Mehmet Cem Satman, Serkan Çimen; Fourth official: Mert Güzenge

6 January 2021 17	Trabzonspor	1–0	Göztepe	Trabzon
16:00	Majid Hosseini (yellow card) 11'; Caleb Ekuban 27'	Report	Berkan Emir (yellow card) 18'; Atınç Nukan (yellow card) 59'; Obinna Nwobodo (yellow card) 85'	Stadium: Şenol Güneş Stadium; Attendance: 0 Referee: Cüneyt Çakır; Assistant referees: Bahattin Duran, Tarık Ongun; Fourth official: Mustafa Kürşad Filiz

18	Bye

16 January 2021 19	Antalyaspor	1–1	Trabzonspor	Antalya
19:00	Ersan Gülüm (yellow card) 11' (yellow-red card) 33'; Fredy (yellow card) 13'; Amilton 25'; Hakan Özmert (yellow card) 69'; Ruud Boffin (yellow card) 78'	Report	Caleb Ekuban (penalty missed) 12'; João Pereira (yellow card) 82'; Benik Afobe 90+6'	Stadium: New Antalya Stadium; Attendance: 0 Referee: Ali Palabıyık; Assistant referees: Ceyhun Sesigüzel, Erdinç Sezertam; Fourth official: Cihat Aydın

19 January 2021 20	Trabzonspor	3–1	Konyaspor	Trabzon
19:00	Anthony Nwakaeme 22' (yellow card) 69'; Flávio 57'; Djaniny 60'; Lewis Baker (yellow card) 81'; Kamil Çörekçi (yellow card) 89'	Report	Ömer Ali Şahiner (yellow card) 24'; Sokol Cikalleshi (yellow card) 35'; Ismaël Diomandé (yellow card) 45'; Levan Shengelia 88'; Musa Çağıran (yellow card) 90'	Stadium: Şenol Güneş Stadium; Attendance: 0 Referee: Abdulkadir Bitigen; Assistant referees: Serkan Ok, Mustafa Savranlar; Fourth official: Emre Kargın

23 January 2021 21	Gençlerbirliği	1–2	Trabzonspor	Ankara
16:00	Soner Dikmen (yellow card) 28'; Dominik Furman (yellow card) 43'; Robert Piris Da Motta 86' (pen.)	Report	Djaniny 36'; Caleb Ekuban 54'; Edgar Ié (yellow card) 85'; Kamil Çörekçi (yellow card) 90+4'	Stadium: Eryaman Stadium; Attendance: 0 Referee: Mustafa Öğretmenoğlu; Assistant referees: Esat Sancaktar, Samet Çiçek; Fourth official: Alper Çetin

31 January 2021 22	Beşiktaş	1–2	Trabzonspor	Istanbul
19:00	Vincent Aboubakar 29'; Valentin Rosier (yellow card) 37'; Dorukhan Toköz (red card) 77'; Adem Ljajić (yellow card) 90'	Report	Caleb Ekuban (yellow card) 40'; Javi Montero 44' (o.g.); Edgar Ié (yellow card) 45+2'; Vitor Hugo 63'; Lewis Baker (yellow card) 90'	Stadium: Vodafone Park; Attendance: 0 Referee: Halil Umut Meler; Assistant referees: Mustafa Emre Eyisoy, Cevdet Kömürcüoğlu; Fourth official: Erkan Özdamar

4 February 2021 23	Trabzonspor	1–0	Denizlispor	Trabzon
19:00	Anastasios Bakasetas 61'	Report	Ángelo Sagal (yellow card) 18'; Recep Niyaz (yellow card) 21'; Mix Diskerud (yellow card) 64'	Stadium: Şenol Güneş Stadium; Attendance: 0 Referee: Tugay Kaan Numanoğlu; Assistant referees: Ceyhun Sesigüzel, Serkan Ok; Fourth official: Caner Ak

8 February 2021 24	Yeni Malatyaspor	0–2	Trabzonspor	Malatya
19:00	Teenage Hadebe (yellow card) 62'	Report	Anastasios Bakasetas 50'; Vitor Hugo (yellow card) 65'; Berat Özdemir (yellow card) 90+2'; Anthony Nwakaeme 90+5'	Stadium: Malatya Arena; Attendance: 0 Referee: Erkan Özdamar; Assistant referees: İbrahim Çağlar Uyarcan, Mustafa Sönmez; Fourth official: Hakan Ceylan

13 February 2021 25	Trabzonspor	1–0	Gaziantep	Trabzon
16:00	Anthony Nwakaeme (yellow card) 56' (yellow-red card) 90+6'; Anastasios Bakasetas (yellow card) 60' (goal) 67'	Report	Kevin Mirallas (yellow card) 56'; Amedej Vetrih (yellow card) 60'; Ertuğrul Ersoy (yellow card) 76'; Alexandru Maxim (yellow card) 89'	Stadium: Şenol Güneş Stadium; Attendance: 0 Referee: Zorbay Küçük; Assistant referees: Kemal Yılmaz, Hakan Yemişken; Fourth official: Yiğit Arslan

19 February 2021 26	Başakşehir	0–1	Trabzonspor	Istanbul
19:00	Enzo Crivelli (yellow card) 64'; Rafael (yellow card) 90' (yellow-red card) 90+4'	Report	Faruk Can Genç (yellow card) 48'; Yusuf Sarı 80' (yellow card) 88'	Stadium: Başakşehir Fatih Terim Stadium; Attendance: 0 Referee: Halil Umut Meler; Assistant referees: Mustafa Emre Eyisoy, Cevdet Kömürcüoğlu; Fourth official: Direnç Tonusluoğlu

28 February 2021 27	Trabzonspor	0–1	Fenerbahçe	Trabzon
19:00	Caleb Ekuban (yellow card) 7'	Report	Mert Hakan Yandaş (yellow card) 56'; Serdar Aziz (yellow card) 72'; Dimitrios Pelkas 76'	Stadium: Şenol Güneş Stadium; Attendance: 0 Referee: Yaşar Kemal Uğurlu; Assistant referees: Serkan Olguncan, Erdinç Sezertam; Fourth official: Ali Şansalan

4 March 2021 28	Kasımpaşa	1–2	Trabzonspor	Istanbul
16:00	Florent Hadergjonaj (yellow card) 33'; Yusuf Erdoğan 39' (pen.)	Report	Djaniny 24' (yellow card) 78'; Anastasios Bakasetas 73'; Uğurcan Çakır (yellow card) 90+2'	Stadium: Recep Tayyip Erdoğan Stadium; Attendance: 0 Referee: Abdulkadir Bitigen; Assistant referees: Kerem Ersoy, Mustafa Savranlar; Fourth official: Abdullah Buğra Taşkınsoy

8 March 2021 29	Trabzonspor	1–3	Alanyaspor	Trabzon
16:00	Anastasios Bakasetas (yellow card) 69' (goal) 80' (pen.); Yusuf Sarı (yellow card) 85'; Vitor Hugo (yellow card) 90+5'	Report	Mustafa Pektemek 66'; Davidson 73', 90+7'; Ceyhun Gülselam (yellow card) 78'; Berkan Kutlu (yellow card) 79'; Georgios Tzavellas (yellow card) 85'	Stadium: Şenol Güneş Stadium; Attendance: 0 Referee: Suat Arslanboğa; Assistant referees: Mehmet Cem Hanoğlu, İlker Takpak; Fourth official: Erkan Özdamar

14 March 2021 30	Erzurumspor	0–0	Trabzonspor	Erzurum
16:00	Petrus Boumal (yellow card) 62'; Zakarya Bergdich (yellow card) 63'	Report		Stadium: Kazım Karabekir Stadium; Attendance: 0 Referee: Ali Palabıyık; Assistant referees: Serkan Ok, Mehmet Cem Satman; Fourth official: Kadir Sağlam

20 March 2021 31	Trabzonspor	4–1	Ankaragücü	Trabzon
19:00	Caleb Ekuban 8', 28'; Djaniny 30' (yellow card) 58'; Edgar Ié 90+4'	Report	İbrahim Akdağ 26' (pen.); Atila Turan (yellow card) 47'; Zvonimir Šarlija (yellow card) 82'	Stadium: Şenol Güneş Stadium; Attendance: 0 Referee: Zorbay Küçük; Assistant referees: İbrahim Çağlar Uyarcan, Kemal Yılmaz; Fourth official: Alper Çetin

3 April 2021 32	Sivasspor	0–0	Trabzonspor	Sivas
16:00	Mustapha Yatabaré (yellow card) 34'; Isaac Cofie (yellow card) 46'; Fayçal Fajr (yellow card) 90+5'	Report	Edgar Ié (yellow card) 75'; Abdülkadir Parmak (yellow card) 90+5'	Stadium: New Sivas 4 Eylül Stadium; Attendance: 0 Referee: Mete Kalkavan; Assistant referees: Ceyhun Sesigüzel, Candaş Elbil; Fourth official: Abdullah Buğra Taşkınsoy

6 April 2021 33	Trabzonspor	1–1	Kayserispor	Trabzon
19:00	Anastasios Bakasetas 29'; Yusuf Sarı (yellow card) 72'	Report	Muğdat Çelik 6'; Daniel Avramovski (yellow card) 9'; Dimitrios Kolovetsios (yellow card) 63'; Melih Okutan (yellow card) 81'; İlhan Parlak (yellow card) 90+5'	Stadium: Şenol Güneş Stadium; Attendance: 0 Referee: Atilla Karaoğlan; Assistant referees: Mehmet Cem Hanoğlu, Esat Sancaktar; Fourth official: Yiğit Arslan

10 April 2021 34	Çaykur Rizespor	0–0	Trabzonspor	Rize
16:00	Yasin Pehlivan (yellow card) 18'; Fabrício Baiano (yellow card) 45'; Selim Ay (yellow card) 71'; İsmail Köybaşı (yellow card) 77'	Report	Vitor Hugo (yellow card) 68' (yellow-red card) 86'; Abdülkadir Parmak (yellow card) 73'	Stadium: Yeni Rize Şehir Stadium; Attendance: 0 Referee: Cüneyt Çakır; Assistant referees: Bahattin Duran, Tarık Ongun; Fourth official: Koray Gençerler

17 April 2021 35	Trabzonspor	1–1	Hatayspor	Trabzon
16:00	Lewis Baker (yellow card) 15'; Djaniny 22'; Abdülkadir Parmak (yellow card) 60'; Yusuf Sarı (yellow card) 88'	Report	Pablo (yellow card) 58'; Rúben Ribeiro (yellow card) 60'; Yusuf Abdioğlu (yellow card) 62'; Aaron Boupendza 90+6' (pen.) (yellow card) 90+9'; Adama Traoré (yellow card) 90+8'	Stadium: Şenol Güneş Stadium; Attendance: 0 Referee: Zorbay Küçük; Assistant referees: Ali Saygın Ögel, Mustafa Sönmez; Fourth official: Murat Erdoğan

21 April 2021 36	Galatasaray	1–1	Trabzonspor	Istanbul
19:00	Marcão (yellow card) 56'; Emre Akbaba 90+6'	Report	Edgar Ié (yellow card) 27' (goal) 76'; Anastasios Bakasetas (yellow card) 60'; Vitor Hugo (yellow card) 65'	Stadium: Türk Telekom Stadium; Attendance: 0 Referee: Mete Kalkavan; Assistant referees: Ceyhun Sesigüzel, Süleyman Özay; Fourth official: Koray Gençerler

24 April 2021 37	Trabzonspor	2–0	Fatih Karagümrük	Trabzon
16:00	Djaniny 15' (pen.), 66'; Marlon (yellow card) 27'	Report	Gastón Campi (yellow card) 49'; Fatih Kuruçuk (yellow card) 69'; Fabio Borini (yellow card) 90+4'	Stadium: Şenol Güneş Stadium; Attendance: 0 Referee: Ali Şansalan; Assistant referees: Serkan Ok, Mehmet Cem Hanoğlu; Fourth official: Kadir Sağlam

28 April 2021 38	Göztepe	1–1	Trabzonspor	İzmir
16:00	Kerim Alıcı (yellow card) 40'; Fousseni Diabaté (yellow card) 41'; Adis Jahović 45+1'; Atınç Nukan (yellow card) 50'; Obinna Nwobodo (yellow card) 72' (yellow-red card) 90'	Report	Anthony Nwakaeme (yellow card) 5'; Berat Özdemir (red card) 67'; Caleb Ekuban 88'; Marlon (yellow card) 90+2'	Stadium: Gürsel Aksel Stadium; Attendance: 0 Referee: Tugay Kaan Numanoğlu; Assistant referees: İbrahim Çağlar Uyarcan, Esat Sancaktar; Fourth official: Çağdaş Altay

39	Bye

8 May 2021 40	Trabzonspor	2–1	Antalyaspor	Trabzon
20:30	Anthony Nwakaeme 13'; Abdülkadir Ömür 49'; Caleb Ekuban (yellow card) 84'	Report	Naldo (yellow card) 60'; Amilton 66'; Fredy (yellow card) 76'; Ruud Boffin (yellow card) 90+2'	Stadium: Şenol Güneş Stadium; Attendance: 0 Referee: Abdulkadir Bitigen; Assistant referees: Volkan Ahmet Narınç, Mustafa Savranlar; Fourth official: Yiğit Arslan

11 May 2021 41	Konyaspor	1–1	Trabzonspor	Konya
17:00	Barış Yardımcı (yellow card) 38'; Ahmet Çalık (yellow card) 64'; Amir Hadžiahmetović 82'	Report	Serkan Asan (red card) 19'; Edgar Ié (yellow card) 33'; Lewis Baker 64' (yellow card) 90+4'	Stadium: Konya Büyükşehir Stadium; Attendance: 0 Referee: Ali Şansalan; Assistant referees: Yusuf Bozdoğan, Osman Gökhan Bilir; Fourth official: Mustafa Kürşad Filiz

15 May 2021 42	Trabzonspor	2–1	Gençlerbirliği	Trabzon
20:30	Caleb Ekuban 45'; Vitor Hugo (yellow card) 72'; Benik Afobe 87'	Report	Floyd Ayité (yellow card) 34' (goal) 52'; Sefa Yılmaz (yellow card) 78'	Stadium: Şenol Güneş Stadium; Attendance: 0 Referee: Tugay Kaan Numanoğlu; Assistant referees: Ceyhun Sesigüzel, Candaş Elbil; Fourth official: Cihan Aydın

=== Turkish Cup ===
16 December 2020 Fifth round	Trabzonspor	2–2 (3–4 p)	Adana Demirspor	Trabzon
18.15	Vitor Hugo 55', 90+3'; João Pereira (yellow card) 56'; Lewis Baker (penalty missed) 90+9'	Report	Yunus Akgün 47'; Mehmet Akyüz 79'; İzzet Çelik (yellow card) 81'; Semih Güler (yellow card) 90+4'; Tayyib Talha Sanuç (yellow card) 90+5'; Joher Rassoul (yellow card) 90+8' (yellow-red card) 90+8'	Stadium: Şenol Güneş Stadium; Referee: Alper Çetin; Assistant referees: Mehmet Ali Akkor, Cem Özbay; Fourth official: Sabit Selvi
	Penalties
	Abdülkadir Parmak (penalty missed); Vitor Hugo (penalty missed); Marlon (penalty scored); Flávio (penalty scored); Lewis Baker (penalty scored)		(penalty scored) Hasan Kılıç; (penalty scored) Mehmet Akyüz; (penalty missed) Pa Dibba; (penalty scored) Gökhan Inler; (penalty scored) Tayyib Talha Sanuç

=== Turkish Super Cup ===
27 January 2021 Final	İstanbul Başakşehir	1–2	Trabzonspor	Istanbul
20:45	Alexandru Epureanu (yellow card) 28' (yellow-red card) 73'; Demba Ba 58' (pen.) (yellow card) 90+3'; Deniz Türüç (yellow card) 88'; Enzo Crivelli (yellow card) 89'	Report	Djaniny 47'; Edgar Ié (yellow card) 56'; Caleb Ekuban 85'; Marlon (yellow card) 90+12'; Berat Özdemir (yellow card) 90+13'	Stadium: Atatürk Olympic Stadium; Referee: Yaşar Kemal Uğurlu; Assistant referees: Erdinç Sezertam, Serkan Çimen; Fourth official: Tugay Kaan Numanoğlu

== Statistics ==
=== Squad statistics ===
No.	Pos.	Player	Süper Lig						Turkish Cup						Turkish Super Cup						Total									
No.	Pos.	Player	Apps	Goal	Asst	Booked	Sent off (straight red)	CS	Apps	Goal	Asst	Booked	Sent off (straight red)	CS	Apps	Goal	Asst	Booked	Sent off (straight red)	CS	Apps	Goal	Asst	Booked	Sent off (straight red)	CS				
1	GK	(Turkey) Uğurcan Çakır	style="border-width: 1px 1px 1px 2px;"	38	0	0	2	0	13	style="border-width: 1px 1px 1px 2px;"	0	0	0	0	0	0	style="border-width: 1px 1px 1px 2px;"	1	0	0	0	0	0	style="border-width: 1px 1px 1px 2px;"	39	0	0	2	0	13
2	MF	(Turkey) Berat Özdemir	style="border-width: 1px 1px 1px 2px;"	15	0	0	1	1	6	style="border-width: 1px 1px 1px 2px;"	0	0	0	0	0	0	style="border-width: 1px 1px 1px 2px;"	1	0	0	1	0	0	style="border-width: 1px 1px 1px 2px;"	16	0	0	2	1	6
3	DF	(Brazil) Marlon	style="border-width: 1px 1px 1px 2px;"	36	0	1	3	0	12	style="border-width: 1px 1px 1px 2px;"	1	0	0	0	0	0	style="border-width: 1px 1px 1px 2px;"	1	0	0	1	0	0	style="border-width: 1px 1px 1px 2px;"	38	0	1	4	0	12
4	DF	(Turkey) Hüseyin Türkmen	style="border-width: 1px 1px 1px 2px;"	11	0	1	0	0	5	style="border-width: 1px 1px 1px 2px;"	0	0	0	0	0	0	style="border-width: 1px 1px 1px 2px;"	0	0	0	0	0	0	style="border-width: 1px 1px 1px 2px;"	11	0	1	0	0	5
5	DF	(Iran) Majid Hosseini	style="border-width: 1px 1px 1px 2px;"	18	0	0	2	0	6	style="border-width: 1px 1px 1px 2px;"	0	0	0	0	0	0	style="border-width: 1px 1px 1px 2px;"	1	0	0	0	0	0	style="border-width: 1px 1px 1px 2px;"	19	0	0	2	0	6
6	MF	(Brazil) Guilherme	style="border-width: 1px 1px 1px 2px;"	2	0	0	0	0	1	style="border-width: 1px 1px 1px 2px;"	0	0	0	0	0	0	style="border-width: 1px 1px 1px 2px;"	0	0	0	0	0	0	style="border-width: 1px 1px 1px 2px;"	2	0	0	0	0	1
7	MF	(Turkey) Yusuf Sarı	style="border-width: 1px 1px 1px 2px;"	26	1	1	4	0	9	style="border-width: 1px 1px 1px 2px;"	1	0	0	0	0	0	style="border-width: 1px 1px 1px 2px;"	1	0	0	0	0	0	style="border-width: 1px 1px 1px 2px;"	28	1	1	4	0	9
8	MF	(England) Lewis Baker	style="border-width: 1px 1px 1px 2px;"	34	2	3	7	0	12	style="border-width: 1px 1px 1px 2px;"	1	0	2	0	0	0	style="border-width: 1px 1px 1px 2px;"	1	0	0	0	0	0	style="border-width: 1px 1px 1px 2px;"	36	2	5	7	0	12
9	FW	(Nigeria) Anthony Nwakaeme	style="border-width: 1px 1px 1px 2px;"	34	7	5	5	1	11	style="border-width: 1px 1px 1px 2px;"	0	0	0	0	0	0	style="border-width: 1px 1px 1px 2px;"	1	0	0	0	0	0	style="border-width: 1px 1px 1px 2px;"	35	7	5	5	1	11
10	MF	(Turkey) Abdülkadir Ömür	style="border-width: 1px 1px 1px 2px;"	23	2	3	0	0	6	style="border-width: 1px 1px 1px 2px;"	0	0	0	0	0	0	style="border-width: 1px 1px 1px 2px;"	0	0	0	0	0	0	style="border-width: 1px 1px 1px 2px;"	23	2	3	0	0	6
11	MF	(Greece) Anastasios Bakasetas	style="border-width: 1px 1px 1px 2px;"	19	6	2	3	0	7	style="border-width: 1px 1px 1px 2px;"	0	0	0	0	0	0	style="border-width: 1px 1px 1px 2px;"	0	0	0	0	0	0	style="border-width: 1px 1px 1px 2px;"	19	6	2	3	0	7
13	DF	(Brazil) Vitor Hugo	style="border-width: 1px 1px 1px 2px;"	30	2	0	8	1	11	style="border-width: 1px 1px 1px 2px;"	1	2	0	0	0	0	style="border-width: 1px 1px 1px 2px;"	1	0	0	0	0	0	style="border-width: 1px 1px 1px 2px;"	32	4	0	8	1	11
14	MF	(Turkey) Hakan Yeşil	style="border-width: 1px 1px 1px 2px;"	1	0	0	0	0	0	style="border-width: 1px 1px 1px 2px;"	0	0	0	0	0	0	style="border-width: 1px 1px 1px 2px;"	0	0	0	0	0	0	style="border-width: 1px 1px 1px 2px;"	1	0	0	0	0	0
15	MF	(Norway) Anders Trondsen	style="border-width: 1px 1px 1px 2px;"	0	0	0	0	0	0	style="border-width: 1px 1px 1px 2px;"	0	0	0	0	0	0	style="border-width: 1px 1px 1px 2px;"	0	0	0	0	0	0	style="border-width: 1px 1px 1px 2px;"	0	0	0	0	0	0
16	GK	(Turkey) Erce Kardeşler	style="border-width: 1px 1px 1px 2px;"	1	0	0	0	0	0	style="border-width: 1px 1px 1px 2px;"	1	0	0	0	0	0	style="border-width: 1px 1px 1px 2px;"	0	0	0	0	0	0	style="border-width: 1px 1px 1px 2px;"	2	0	0	0	0	0
17	FW	(Mali) Fousseni Diabaté	style="border-width: 1px 1px 1px 2px;"	6	0	0	0	0	1	style="border-width: 1px 1px 1px 2px;"	1	0	0	0	0	0	style="border-width: 1px 1px 1px 2px;"	0	0	0	0	0	0	style="border-width: 1px 1px 1px 2px;"	7	0	0	0	0	1
18	FW	(Ghana) Caleb Ekuban	style="border-width: 1px 1px 1px 2px;"	32	10	4	3	0	12	style="border-width: 1px 1px 1px 2px;"	0	0	0	0	0	0	style="border-width: 1px 1px 1px 2px;"	1	1	0	0	0	0	style="border-width: 1px 1px 1px 2px;"	33	11	4	3	0	12
19	MF	(Turkey) Safa Kınalı	style="border-width: 1px 1px 1px 2px;"	9	0	0	1	0	2	style="border-width: 1px 1px 1px 2px;"	1	0	0	0	0	0	style="border-width: 1px 1px 1px 2px;"	0	0	0	0	0	0	style="border-width: 1px 1px 1px 2px;"	10	0	0	1	0	2
21	FW	(Cape Verde) Djaniny	style="border-width: 1px 1px 1px 2px;"	30	8	1	2	0	11	style="border-width: 1px 1px 1px 2px;"	0	0	0	0	0	0	style="border-width: 1px 1px 1px 2px;"	1	1	1	0	0	0	style="border-width: 1px 1px 1px 2px;"	31	9	2	2	0	11
22	DF	(Argentina) Gastón Campi	style="border-width: 1px 1px 1px 2px;"	3	1	1	0	0	1	style="border-width: 1px 1px 1px 2px;"	0	0	0	0	0	0	style="border-width: 1px 1px 1px 2px;"	0	0	0	0	0	0	style="border-width: 1px 1px 1px 2px;"	3	1	1	0	0	1
23	DF	(Turkey) Kamil Çörekçi	style="border-width: 1px 1px 1px 2px;"	19	0	1	4	0	5	style="border-width: 1px 1px 1px 2px;"	1	0	0	0	0	0	style="border-width: 1px 1px 1px 2px;"	0	0	0	0	0	0	style="border-width: 1px 1px 1px 2px;"	20	0	1	4	0	5
24	MF	(Brazil) Flávio	style="border-width: 1px 1px 1px 2px;"	31	1	2	5	2	12	style="border-width: 1px 1px 1px 2px;"	1	0	0	0	0	0	style="border-width: 1px 1px 1px 2px;"	1	0	0	0	0	0	style="border-width: 1px 1px 1px 2px;"	33	1	2	5	2	12
28	FW	(Turkey) Salih Kavrazlı	style="border-width: 1px 1px 1px 2px;"	0	0	0	0	0	0	style="border-width: 1px 1px 1px 2px;"	0	0	0	0	0	0	style="border-width: 1px 1px 1px 2px;"	0	0	0	0	0	0	style="border-width: 1px 1px 1px 2px;"	0	0	0	0	0	0
29	MF	(Turkey) Yunus Mallı	style="border-width: 1px 1px 1px 2px;"	13	0	0	0	0	7	style="border-width: 1px 1px 1px 2px;"	0	0	0	0	0	0	style="border-width: 1px 1px 1px 2px;"	0	0	0	0	0	0	style="border-width: 1px 1px 1px 2px;"	13	0	0	0	0	7
32	DF	(Portugal) Edgar Ié	style="border-width: 1px 1px 1px 2px;"	38	2	0	6	0	14	style="border-width: 1px 1px 1px 2px;"	1	0	0	0	0	0	style="border-width: 1px 1px 1px 2px;"	1	0	0	1	0	0	style="border-width: 1px 1px 1px 2px;"	40	2	0	7	0	14
33	DF	(Turkey) Abdurrahim Dursun	style="border-width: 1px 1px 1px 2px;"	2	0	0	0	0	0	style="border-width: 1px 1px 1px 2px;"	0	0	0	0	0	0	style="border-width: 1px 1px 1px 2px;"	0	0	0	0	0	0	style="border-width: 1px 1px 1px 2px;"	2	0	0	0	0	0
38	MF	(Turkey) Ahmet Canbaz	style="border-width: 1px 1px 1px 2px;"	4	0	0	0	0	1	style="border-width: 1px 1px 1px 2px;"	0	0	0	0	0	0	style="border-width: 1px 1px 1px 2px;"	0	0	0	0	0	0	style="border-width: 1px 1px 1px 2px;"	4	0	0	0	0	1
39	DF	(Turkey) Atakan Gündüz	style="border-width: 1px 1px 1px 2px;"	1	0	0	0	0	1	style="border-width: 1px 1px 1px 2px;"	0	0	0	0	0	0	style="border-width: 1px 1px 1px 2px;"	0	0	0	0	0	0	style="border-width: 1px 1px 1px 2px;"	1	0	0	0	0	1
45	FW	(Turkey) Bilal Başaçıkoğlu	style="border-width: 1px 1px 1px 2px;"	6	0	0	1	0	3	style="border-width: 1px 1px 1px 2px;"	1	0	0	0	0	0	style="border-width: 1px 1px 1px 2px;"	0	0	0	0	0	0	style="border-width: 1px 1px 1px 2px;"	7	0	0	1	0	3
47	DF	(Portugal) João Pereira	style="border-width: 1px 1px 1px 2px;"	8	0	1	4	1	4	style="border-width: 1px 1px 1px 2px;"	1	0	0	1	0	0	style="border-width: 1px 1px 1px 2px;"	0	0	0	0	0	0	style="border-width: 1px 1px 1px 2px;"	9	0	1	5	1	4
52	FW	(Ecuador) Stiven Plaza	style="border-width: 1px 1px 1px 2px;"	2	0	0	0	0	0	style="border-width: 1px 1px 1px 2px;"	1	0	0	0	0	0	style="border-width: 1px 1px 1px 2px;"	0	0	0	0	0	0	style="border-width: 1px 1px 1px 2px;"	3	0	0	0	0	0
54	GK	(Turkey) Muhammet Taha Tepe	style="border-width: 1px 1px 1px 2px;"	0	0	0	0	0	0	style="border-width: 1px 1px 1px 2px;"	0	0	0	0	0	0	style="border-width: 1px 1px 1px 2px;"	0	0	0	0	0	0	style="border-width: 1px 1px 1px 2px;"	0	0	0	0	0	0
59	GK	(Turkey) Arda Akbulut	style="border-width: 1px 1px 1px 2px;"	0	0	0	0	0	0	style="border-width: 1px 1px 1px 2px;"	0	0	0	0	0	0	style="border-width: 1px 1px 1px 2px;"	0	0	0	0	0	0	style="border-width: 1px 1px 1px 2px;"	0	0	0	0	0	0
61	MF	(Turkey) Abdülkadir Parmak	style="border-width: 1px 1px 1px 2px;"	26	0	0	6	0	9	style="border-width: 1px 1px 1px 2px;"	1	0	0	0	0	0	style="border-width: 1px 1px 1px 2px;"	1	0	0	0	0	0	style="border-width: 1px 1px 1px 2px;"	28	0	0	6	0	9
70	DF	(Turkey) Ahmetcan Kaplan	style="border-width: 1px 1px 1px 2px;"	0	0	0	0	0	0	style="border-width: 1px 1px 1px 2px;"	0	0	0	0	0	0	style="border-width: 1px 1px 1px 2px;"	0	0	0	0	0	0	style="border-width: 1px 1px 1px 2px;"	0	0	0	0	0	0
71	MF	(Turkey) Süleyman Cebeci	style="border-width: 1px 1px 1px 2px;"	0	0	0	0	0	0	style="border-width: 1px 1px 1px 2px;"	0	0	0	0	0	0	style="border-width: 1px 1px 1px 2px;"	0	0	0	0	0	0	style="border-width: 1px 1px 1px 2px;"	0	0	0	0	0	0
75	DF	(Turkey) Faruk Can Genç	style="border-width: 1px 1px 1px 2px;"	1	0	0	1	0	1	style="border-width: 1px 1px 1px 2px;"	1	0	0	0	0	0	style="border-width: 1px 1px 1px 2px;"	0	0	0	0	0	0	style="border-width: 1px 1px 1px 2px;"	2	0	0	1	0	1
77	MF	(Turkey) Kerem Baykuş	style="border-width: 1px 1px 1px 2px;"	0	0	0	0	0	0	style="border-width: 1px 1px 1px 2px;"	1	0	0	0	0	0	style="border-width: 1px 1px 1px 2px;"	0	0	0	0	0	0	style="border-width: 1px 1px 1px 2px;"	1	0	0	0	0	0
79	FW	(Democratic Republic of the Congo) Benik Afobe	style="border-width: 1px 1px 1px 2px;"	28	5	0	1	0	10	style="border-width: 1px 1px 1px 2px;"	0	0	0	0	0	0	style="border-width: 1px 1px 1px 2px;"	1	0	0	0	0	0	style="border-width: 1px 1px 1px 2px;"	29	5	0	1	0	10
83	GK	(Turkey) Hakan Aydın	style="border-width: 1px 1px 1px 2px;"	0	0	0	0	0	0	style="border-width: 1px 1px 1px 2px;"	0	0	0	0	0	0	style="border-width: 1px 1px 1px 2px;"	0	0	0	0	0	0	style="border-width: 1px 1px 1px 2px;"	0	0	0	0	0	0
84	GK	(Turkey) Adem Ağaoğlu	style="border-width: 1px 1px 1px 2px;"	0	0	0	0	0	0	style="border-width: 1px 1px 1px 2px;"	0	0	0	0	0	0	style="border-width: 1px 1px 1px 2px;"	0	0	0	0	0	0	style="border-width: 1px 1px 1px 2px;"	0	0	0	0	0	0
98	GK	(Turkey) Kağan Moradaoğlu	style="border-width: 1px 1px 1px 2px;"	1	0	0	0	0	1	style="border-width: 1px 1px 1px 2px;"	0	0	0	0	0	0	style="border-width: 1px 1px 1px 2px;"	0	0	0	0	0	0	style="border-width: 1px 1px 1px 2px;"	1	0	0	0	0	1
99	DF	(Turkey) Serkan Asan	style="border-width: 1px 1px 1px 2px;"	28	1	2	2	1	6	style="border-width: 1px 1px 1px 2px;"	1	0	0	0	0	0	style="border-width: 1px 1px 1px 2px;"	1	0	0	0	0	0	style="border-width: 1px 1px 1px 2px;"	30	1	2	2	1	6
