= List of Turkish football transfers summer 2024 =

This is a list of Turkish football transfers in the 2024 summer transfer window by club. Only clubs in the 2024–25 Süper Lig are included.

== Süper Lig ==
=== Galatasaray ===
In:

No.	Pos.	Nation	Player
20	MF	(Brazil) BRA	Gabriel Sara (from (England) Norwich City)
22	MF	(Morocco) MAR	Hakim Ziyech (from (England) Chelsea, previously on loan)
24	DF	(Denmark) DEN	Elias Jelert (from (Denmark) Copenhagen)
44	FW	(Belgium) BEL	Michy Batshuayi (from Fenerbahçe)

Out:

No.	Pos.	Nation	Player
20	MF	(Brazil) BRA	Tetê (to (Greece) Panathinaikos)
39	DF	(Turkey) TUR	Işık Kaan Arslan (to Boluspor)
40	DF	(Turkey) TUR	Emin Bayram (to (Belgium) Westerlo)
47	MF	(Turkey) TUR	Siraçhan Nas (on loan to Boluspor)
50	GK	(Turkey) TUR	Jankat Yılmaz (on loan to Adanaspor)
56	FW	(Turkey) TUR	Baran Demiroğlu (on loan to Karagümrük)
64	FW	(Turkey) TUR	Eren Aydın (on loan to Boluspor)
81	MF	(Turkey) TUR	Hamza Akman (to (Denmark) Sønderjyske)
92	DF	(Ivory Coast) CIV	Serge Aurier (released)
—	MF	(Italy) ITA	Nicolò Zaniolo (on loan to (Italy) Atalanta, previously on loan at (England) Aston Villa)
—	DF	(Denmark) DEN	Mathias Ross (on loan to (Czech Republic) Sparta Prague, previously on loan at (Netherlands) NEC)
—	MF	(Turkey) TUR	Baran Aksaka (on loan to (Bulgaria) Arda Kardzhali, previously on loan at Gençlerbirliği)
—	DF	(Turkey) TUR	Kazımcan Karataş (on loan to (Russia) Orenburg, previously on loan at Ankaragücü)
—	MF	(Turkey) TUR	Emirhan Kayar (on loan to Çorluspor, previously on loan at Beyoğlu Yeni Çarşı S.F.)
—	FW	(Turkey) TUR	Caner Doğan (to Çorluspor, previously on loan at Sarıyer)

=== Fenerbahçe ===
In:

No.	Pos.	Nation	Player
2	DF	(Turkey) TUR	Çağlar Söyüncü (from (Spain) Atlético Madrid, previously on loan)
19	FW	(Morocco) MAR	Youssef En-Nesyri (from (Spain) Sevilla)
22	DF	(Turkey) TUR	Levent Mercan (from Karagümrük)
23	FW	(Turkey) TUR	Cenk Tosun (from Beşiktaş)
33	MF	(Bosnia and Herzegovina) BIH	Rade Krunić (from (Italy) AC Milan, previously on loan)
70	MF	(Turkey) TUR	Oğuz Aydın (from Alanyaspor)
97	FW	(France) FRA	Allan Saint-Maximin (on loan from (Saudi Arabia) Al-Ahli)

Out:

No.	Pos.	Nation	Player
4	DF	(Turkey) TUR	Serdar Aziz (released)
7	DF	(Turkey) TUR	Ferdi Kadıoğlu (to (England) Brighton & Hove Albion)
15	FW	(Norway) NOR	Joshua King (to (France) Toulouse)
19	DF	(Italy) ITA	Leonardo Bonucci (retired)
23	FW	(Belgium) BEL	Michy Batshuayi (to Galatasaray)
—	FW	(Italy) ITA	João Pedro (released, previously on loan at (Brazil) Grêmio)
—	MF	(South Korea) KOR	Jo Jin-ho (on loan to (Serbia) Radnički Niš, previously on loan at (Serbia) Novi Pazar)
—	MF	(Portugal) POR	Miguel Crespo (to Başakşehir, previously on loan at (Spain) Rayo Vallecano)
—	DF	(Turkey) TUR	Çağtay Kurukalıp (on loan to Karagümrük, previously on loan at İskenderunspor)
—	MF	(Turkey) TUR	Emre Demir (on loan to Sakaryaspor, previously on loan at Ümraniyespor)
—	FW	(Turkey) TUR	Tiago Çukur (to (Netherlands) Roda JC, previously on loan at Ümraniyespor)
—	FW	(Turkey) TUR	Umut Nayir (to Konyaspor, previously on loan at Pendikspor)
—	DF	(Turkey) TUR	Emir Ortakaya (on loan to (Belgium) Westerlo, previously on loan at Kocaelispor)
—	FW	(Turkey) TUR	Yusuf Kocatürk (to Ümraniyespor, previously on loan at İnegölspor)
—	DF	(Turkey) TUR	Yiğit Efe Demir (on loan to Karagümrük, previously on loan at Gençlerbirliği)
—	MF	(Ivory Coast) CIV	Marius Tresor Doh (on loan to Karagümrük)
—	MF	(Turkey) TUR	Efekan Karayazı (on loan to (Austria) Floridsdorfer AC)

=== Trabzonspor ===
In:

No.	Pos.	Nation	Player
3	DF	(Croatia) CRO	Borna Barišić (from (Scotland) Rangers)
5	MF	(England) ENG	John Lundstram (from (Scotland) Rangers)
9	FW	(Nigeria) NGA	Anthony Nwakaeme (from (Saudi Arabia) Al-Fayha)
11	FW	(Turkey) TUR	Ozan Tufan (from (England) Hull City)
15	DF	(Montenegro) MNE	Stefan Savić (from (Spain) Atlético Madrid)
17	MF	(Austria) AUT	Muhammed Cham (from (France) Clermont)
35	MF	(Turkey) TUR	Okay Yokuşlu (from (England) West Bromwich Albion)
44	DF	(Ukraine) UKR	Arseniy Batahov (from (Ukraine) Zorya Luhansk)
61	FW	(Turkey) TUR	Cihan Çanak (from (Belgium) Standard Liège)
70	FW	(Romania) ROU	Denis Drăguș (from (Belgium) Standard Liège)
79	DF	(Portugal) POR	Pedro Malheiro (from (Portugal) Boavista)

Out:

No.	Pos.	Nation	Player
2	DF	(Turkey) TUR	Rayyan Baniya (on loan to (Italy) Palermo)
3	DF	(Spain) ESP	Joaquín (to (United States) Sporting Kansas City)
12	DF	(Belgium) BEL	Thomas Meunier (to (France) Lille)
14	FW	(Greece) GRE	Taxiarchis Fountas (to (Greece) OFI)
16	FW	(Turkey) TUR	Kerem Şen (on loan to İstanbulspor)
29	FW	(Ivory Coast) CIV	Nicolas Pépé (to (Spain) Villarreal)
98	GK	(Turkey) TUR	Kağan Moradaoğlu (to Erzurumspor)
—	FW	(Turkey) TUR	Kerem Baykuş (to Kastamonuspor (GMG Kastamonuspor), previously on loan at 1461 Trabzon)
—	MF	(Morocco) MAR	Montasser Lahtimi (released, previously on loan at (Morocco) Wydad)
—	FW	(Uruguay) URU	Maxi Gómez (released, previously on loan at (Spain) Cádiz)
—	MF	(Turkey) TUR	Hakan Yeşil (to Pendikspor, previously on loan at Trabzon)
—	MF	(Brazil) BRA	Flávio (to (Saudi Arabia) Al Taawoun, previously on loan)
—	MF	(Azerbaijan) AZE	Murat Akpınar (to Sakaryaspor, previously on loan)
—	MF	(Greece) GRE	Dimitrios Kourbelis (to (Saudi Arabia) Al-Khaleej, previously on loan at Karagümrük)
—	MF	(Montenegro) MNE	Ognjen Bakić (to (Croatia) Šibenik)
—	FW	(Turkey) TUR	Abdurrahman Bayram (on loan to İnegölspor)
—	MF	(Turkey) TUR	Emirhan Zaman (to 1461 Trabzon, previously on loan)
—	GK	(Turkey) TUR	Hakan Aydın (on loan to Beykoz Ishakli Spor, previously on loan at Sebat Gençlik)
—	FW	(Turkey) TUR	Zekeriya Bulut (on loan to Sebat Gençlik, previously on loan at Çankaya)
—	MF	(Turkey) TUR	Kadir Bakırtaş (to Karşıyaka, previously on loan at Çankaya)
—	FW	(Turkey) TUR	Batuhan Kör (to Vanspor, previously on loan at 1461 Trabzon)
—	DF	(Turkey) TUR	Yunus Emre Köse (to Orduspor (52 Orduspor FK), previously on loan)
—	MF	(Turkey) TUR	Veysel Sönmezsoy (on loan to Sebat Gençlik)
—	FW	(Turkey) TUR	Emir Uzun (to Beykoz Ishakli, previously on loan at Sebat Gençlik)

=== Başakşehir ===
In:

No.	Pos.	Nation	Player
2	MF	(Turkey) TUR	Berat Özdemir (on loan from (Saudi Arabia) Al-Ettifaq, previously on loan at Trabzonspor)
3	DF	(Ghana) GHA	Jerome Opoku (from (Portugal) Arouca, previously on loan)
13	MF	(Portugal) POR	Miguel Crespo (from Fenerbahçe)
22	MF	(Portugal) POR	Matchoi Djaló (from (Portugal) Paços Ferreira)
27	DF	(Senegal) SEN	Ousseynou Ba (from (Greece) Olympiacos, previously on loan)

Out:

No.	Pos.	Nation	Player
8	MF	(Serbia) SRB	Danijel Aleksić (to Konyaspor)
19	MF	(Algeria) ALG	Mehdi Abeid (to (Saudi Arabia) Al Raed)
21	MF	(Turkey) TUR	Mahmut Tekdemir (to Ankaragücü)
89	MF	(Brazil) BRA	Souza (to (Brazil) Vasco da Gama)
—	MF	(Turkey) TUR	Ravil Tagir (to (United Arab Emirates) Al-Jazira, previously on loan at (Belgium) Westerlo)
—	DF	(Azerbaijan) AZE	Mert Çelik (to (Azerbaijan) Sabail, previously on loan at Bandırmaspor)
—	MF	(Israel) ISR	Eden Karzev (on loan to (China) Shenzhen Peng City, previously on loan at (Israel) Maccabi Tel Aviv)
—	DF	(Republic of the Congo) CGO	Francis Nzaba (on loan to Erokspor, previously on loan at Gençlerbirliği)
—	FW	(Turkey) TUR	Muhammet Arslantaş (on loan to Elazığspor, previously on loan at Şanlıurfaspor)
—	DF	(Turkey) TUR	Muhammed Sarıkaya (to 1461 Trabzon, previously on loan at GMG Kastamonuspor)
—	FW	(Turkey) TUR	Efe Arda Koyuncu (on loan to Şanlıurfaspor)
—	DF	(Turkey) TUR	Ayberk Kaygısız (to Vanspor)
—	DF	(Turkey) TUR	Yağız Dilek (on loan to Bandirmaspor)
—	FW	(Turkey) TUR	Batuhan Çelik (on loan to Ümraniyespor)
—	MF	(Turkey) TUR	Berkay Aydoğmuş (on loan to Erokspor)
—	MF	(Guinea) GUI	Sékou Tidiany Bangoura (on loan to (Israel) Kiryat Shmona, previously on loan at Tuzlaspor)

=== Kasımpaşa ===
In:

No.	Pos.	Nation	Player

Out:

No.	Pos.	Nation	Player

=== Beşiktaş ===
In:

No.	Pos.	Nation	Player
3	DF	(Brazil) BRA	Gabriel Paulista (from (Spain) Atlético Madrid)
14	DF	(Germany) GER	Felix Uduokhai (on loan from (Germany) FC Augsburg)
17	FW	(Italy) ITA	Ciro Immobile (from (Italy) Lazio)
27	MF	(Portugal) POR	Rafa Silva (from (Portugal) Benfica)
28	MF	(Libya) LBY	Al-Musrati (from (Portugal) Braga, previously on loan)
53	DF	(Turkey) TUR	Emirhan Topçu (from Çaykur Rizespor)
73	MF	(Italy) ITA	Cher Ndour (on loan from (France) Paris Saint-Germain)
77	MF	(Austria) AUT	Can Keleş (from Austria Wien)

Out:

No.	Pos.	Nation	Player
7	FW	(Croatia) CRO	Ante Rebić (to (Italy) Lecce)
9	FW	(Turkey) TUR	Cenk Tosun (to Fenerbahçe)
17	DF	(England) ENG	Joe Worrall (loan return to (England) Nottingham Forest, later to (England) Burnley)
18	FW	(Algeria) ALG	Rachid Ghezzal (released)
19	MF	(Bosnia and Herzegovina) BIH	Amir Hadžiahmetović (on loan to Çaykur Rizespor)
40	FW	(Democratic Republic of the Congo) COD	Jackson Muleka (on loan to (Saudi Arabia) Al-Kholood)
75	DF	(Turkey) TUR	Tayfur Bingöl (on loan to Eyüpspor)
77	DF	(Turkey) TUR	Umut Meraş (to Eyüpspor)
88	MF	(Switzerland) SUI	Gökhan Inler (retired)
—	DF	(France) FRA	Valentin Rosier (to (Spain) Leganés, previously on loan at (France) Nice)
—	DF	(Spain) ESP	Javi Montero (released, previously on loan at (Portugal) Arouca)
—	MF	(Bosnia and Herzegovina) BIH	Ajdin Hasić (to (Poland) Cracovia, previously on loan at (Bosnia and Herzegovina) Sarajevo)
—	DF	(Turkey) TUR	Erdoğan Kaya (to Kırklarelispor, previously on loan at Beyoğlu Yeni Çarşı)
—	MF	(Turkey) TUR	Ahmet Gülay (to Balıkesirspor, previously on loan at Alanya Kestelspor)
—	MF	(Turkey) TUR	Kerem Atakan Kesgin (on loan to Bandırmaspor, previously on loan at Sivasspor)
—	FW	(Turkey) TUR	Emrecan Uzunhan (on loan to Antalyaspor, previously on loan)
—	FW	(Turkey) TUR	Emrecan Bulut (to Çaykur Rizespor, previously on loan at Ümraniyespor)
—	DF	(Turkey) TUR	Aytuğ Kömeç (on loan to (Serbia) IMT)
—	MF	(Turkey) TUR	Azad Demir (on loan to Batman Petrolspor)
—	MF	(Turkey) TUR	Abdülmecid Dönmez (on loan to Adana (Adana 01 FK))
—	DF	(Turkey) TUR	Bilal Ceylan (to Serik Belediyespor, previously on loan at Karşıyaka)
—	MF	(Turkey) TUR	Necati Bilgiç (to GMG Kastamonu, previously on loan at Adana 1954 FK)
—	MF	(Turkey) TUR	Halil Çiçek (to Niğde Anadolu, previously on loan at Silivrispor)
—	DF	(Ivory Coast) CIV	Badra Cissé (released, previously on loan at CSU Alba Iulia)

=== Sivasspor ===
In:

No.	Pos.	Nation	Player

Out:

No.	Pos.	Nation	Player

=== Alanyaspor ===
In:

No.	Pos.	Nation	Player

Out:

No.	Pos.	Nation	Player

=== Rizespor ===
In:

No.	Pos.	Nation	Player

Out:

No.	Pos.	Nation	Player

=== Antalyaspor ===
In:

No.	Pos.	Nation	Player

Out:

No.	Pos.	Nation	Player

=== Gaziantep ===
In:

No.	Pos.	Nation	Player

Out:

No.	Pos.	Nation	Player

=== Adana Demirspor ===
In:

No.	Pos.	Nation	Player

Out:

No.	Pos.	Nation	Player

=== Samsunspor ===
In:

No.	Pos.	Nation	Player

Out:

No.	Pos.	Nation	Player

=== Kayserispor ===
In:

No.	Pos.	Nation	Player

Out:

No.	Pos.	Nation	Player

=== Hatayspor ===
In:

No.	Pos.	Nation	Player

Out:

No.	Pos.	Nation	Player

=== Konyaspor ===
In:

No.	Pos.	Nation	Player

Out:

No.	Pos.	Nation	Player

=== Eyüpspor ===
In:

No.	Pos.	Nation	Player

Out:

No.	Pos.	Nation	Player

=== Göztepe ===
In:

No.	Pos.	Nation	Player

Out:

No.	Pos.	Nation	Player

=== Bodrum ===
In:

No.	Pos.	Nation	Player

Out:

No.	Pos.	Nation	Player
