= 2020 Turkish Super Cup =

- Event: Turkish Super Cup
İstanbul Başakşehir	Trabzonspor
1	2
- Date: 27 January 2021
- Venue: Atatürk Olympic Stadium, Istanbul
- Man of the Match: Caleb Ekuban
- Referee: Yaşar Kemal Uğurlu
- Attendance: 0 (Note: The match was played behind closed doors due to the COVID-19 pandemic in Turkey.)

The 2020 Turkish Super Cup (Turkish: TFF Süper Kupa) was the 47th edition of the Turkish Super Cup since its establishment as Presidential Cup in 1966, the annual Turkish football match contested by the winners of the previous season's top league and cup competitions (or cup runner-up in case the league- and cup-winning club is the same). It was played on 27 January 2021 between the champions of the 2019–20 Süper Lig, İstanbul Başakşehir, and the winners of the 2019–20 Turkish Cup, Trabzonspor. The venue initially selected was Doha, the capital of Qatar. However, the Turkish Football Federation later announced the venue would be changed to the Atatürk Olympic Stadium in Istanbul.

== Match ==
=== Details ===
27 January 2021
20:45 TRT

İstanbul Başakşehir	1–2	Trabzonspor
Ba 58' (pen.)	Report	Djaniny 47'; Ekuban 85'

Atatürk Olympic Stadium, Istanbul
Attendance: 0
Referee: Yaşar Kemal Uğurlu

İstanbul Başakşehir	Trabzonspor

GK	34	(Turkey) Mert Günok
RB	42	(Turkey) Ömer Ali Şahiner
CB	26	(Cape Verde) Ponck
CB	6	(Moldova) Alexandru Epureanu	(yellow card) 28' (yellow-red card) 73'
LB	3	(Turkey) Hasan Ali Kaldırım
DM	5	(Turkey) Mehmet Topal
DM	14	(Nigeria) Azubuike Okechukwu	(substituted off) 55'
RM	23	(Turkey) Deniz Türüç	(yellow card) 88'	(substituted off) 90+4'
AM	8	(Serbia) Danijel Aleksić
LM	9	(Chile) Junior Fernandes	(substituted off) 75'
CF	19	(Senegal) Demba Ba (c)	(yellow card) 90+3'
Substitutes:
GK	1	(Turkey) Volkan Babacan
GK	16	(Turkey) Muhammed Şengezer
DF	2	(Brazil) Léo Duarte	(substituted on) 75'
DF	24	(Turkey) Ravil Tagir
DF	25	(Turkey) Muhammed Sarıkaya
DF	33	(Turkey) Uğur Uçar
DF	88	(Turkey) Cemali Sertel
MF	21	(Turkey) Mahmut Tekdemir
FW	22	(Norway) Fredrik Gulbrandsen	(substituted on) 90+4'
FW	27	(France) Enzo Crivelli	(substituted on) 55'	(yellow card) 89'
Manager:
(Turkey) Okan Buruk

GK	1	(Turkey) Uğurcan Çakır (c)
RB	99	(Turkey) Serkan Asan
CB	32	(Portugal) Edgar Ié	(yellow card) 56'
CB	13	(Brazil) Vitor Hugo
LB	3	(Brazil) Marlon	(yellow card) 90+12'
DM	2	(Turkey) Berat Özdemir	(yellow card) 90+13'
DM	61	(Turkey) Abdülkadir Parmak	(substituted off) 45+3'
RM	18	(Ghana) Caleb Ekuban	(substituted off) 90+4'
AM	24	(Brazil) Flávio	(substituted off) 77'
LM	9	(Nigeria) Anthony Nwakaeme
CF	21	(Cape Verde) Djaniny	(substituted off) 90+4'
Substitutes:
GK	16	(Turkey) Erce Kardeşler
DF	4	(Turkey) Hüseyin Türkmen
DF	5	(Iran) Majid Hosseini	(substituted on) 90+4'
DF	23	(Turkey) Kamil Çörekçi
DF	39	(Turkey) Atakan Gündüz
DF	75	(Turkey) Faruk Can Genç
MF	7	(Turkey) Yusuf Sarı	(substituted on) 77'
MF	8	(England) Lewis Baker	(substituted on) 45+3'
MF	19	(Turkey) Safa Kınalı
FW	79	(Democratic Republic of the Congo) Benik Afobe	(substituted on) 90+4'
Manager:
(Turkey) Abdullah Avcı
