= Marlon (footballer, born May 1997) =

Brazilian footballer (born 1997)

Personal information
- Full name: Marlon Rodrigues Xavier
- Date of birth: 20 May 1997 (age 29)
- Place of birth: Cascavel, Brazil
- Height: 1.73 m (5 ft 8 in)
- Position: Left-back

Team information
- Current team: Grêmio
- Number: 23

Senior career*
Years	Team	Apps	(Gls)
2015–2017	Criciúma	74	(0)
2017–2022	Fluminense	66	(1)
2019–2020	→ Boavista (loan)	26	(2)
2020–2021	→ Trabzonspor (loan)	36	(0)
2022–2023	Ankaragücü	13	(0)
2023–2025	Cruzeiro	81	(4)
2025	→ Grêmio (loan)	31	(1)
2026–	Grêmio	13	(1)
- * Club domestic league appearances and goals as of 7 April 2026

Marlon Rodrigues Xavier (born 20 May 1997), sometimes known as just Marlon, is a Brazilian professional footballer who plays as a left-back for Campeonato Brasileiro Série A club Grêmio.

== Career ==
Marlon made his professional debut for Criciúma in a 1–0 Campeonato Brasileiro Série B win over Botafogo on 7 November 2015. After spending his early career in Brazil with Criciúma and Fluminense, Marlon joined Boavista F.C. on loan on 5 August 2019.

== Career statistics ==
As of match played 3 September 2023

Appearances and goals by club, season and competition
Club	Season	League			State League		National cup		Continental		Other		Total	
Club	Season	Division	Apps	Goals	Apps	Goals	Apps	Goals	Apps	Goals	Apps	Goals	Apps	Goals
Criciúma	2015	Série B	5	0	0	0	0	0	—		—		5	0
Criciúma	2016	Série B	20	0	19	0	2	0	—		—		41	0
Criciúma	2017	Série B	8	0	15	0	0	0	—		—		23	0
Criciúma	Total		33	0	34	0	2	0	—		—		69	0
Fluminense	2017	Série A	15	0	2	0	0	0	4 (Note: Appearance(s) in the Copa Sudamericana)	0	0	0	21	0
Fluminense	2018	Série A	12	0	5	0	0	0	1	0	0	0	18	0
Fluminense	2019	Série A	0	0	4	0	0	0	1	0	0	0	5	0
Fluminense	2021	Série A	13	0	0	0	0	0	0	0	0	0	13	0
Fluminense	2022	Série A	3	0	0	0	1	0	3	0	0	0	7	0
Fluminense	Total		43	0	11	0	1	0	9	0	0	0	64	0
Boavista (loan)	2019–20	Primeira Liga	26	2	—		1	0	—		—		27	2
Trabzonspor (loan)	2020–21	Süper Lig	36	0	—		1	0	0	0	1 (Note: Appearance in Turkish Super Cup)	0	38	0
Ankaragücü	2022–23	Süper Lig	13	0	—		2	0	—		—		15	0
Cruzeiro	2023	Série A	21	2	1	0	4	0	—		—		26	2
Career total			172	4	46	0	11	0	9	0	1	0	239	4

== Honours ==
Trabzonspor

- Turkish Super Cup: 2020

Grêmio

- Campeonato Gaúcho: 2026
