= Edgar Ié =

Bissau-Guinean footballer (born 1994)

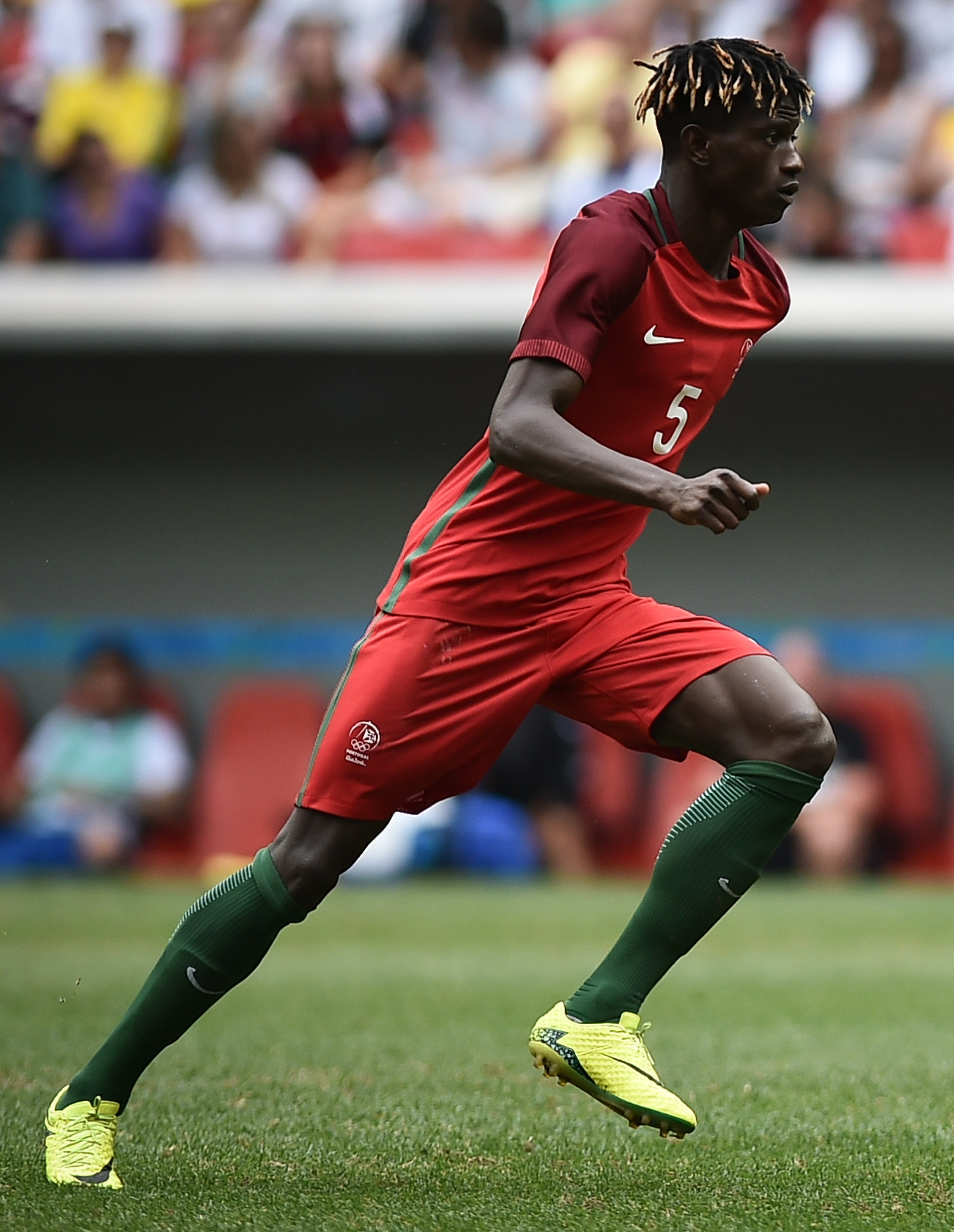
- Ié with Portugal at the 2016 Olympics

Personal information
- Full name: Edgar Miguel Ié
- Date of birth: 1 May 1994 (age 32)
- Place of birth: Bissau, Guinea-Bissau
- Height: 1.80 m (5 ft 11 in)
- Position: Defender

Team information
- Current team: Feirense
- Number: 32

Youth career
- 2004–2006: União Bissau
- 2007–2008: Oeiras
- 2008–2012: Sporting CP

Senior career*
| Years | Team | Apps | (Gls) |
| 2012–2015 | Barcelona B | 48 | (0) |
| 2014 | Barcelona | 0 | (0) |
| 2015–2016 | Villarreal B | 31 | (0) |
| 2017 | Belenenses | 12 | (0) |
| 2017–2019 | Lille | 42 | (1) |
| 2019 | → Nantes (loan) | 9 | (0) |
| 2019–2022 | Trabzonspor | 55 | (2) |
| 2019–2020 | → Feyenoord (loan) | 11 | (0) |
| 2023–2024 | İstanbul Başakşehir | 5 | (0) |
| 2024 | Dinamo București | 5 | (0) |
| 2025– | Feirense | 3 | (1) |

International career
| 2012 | Portugal U18 | 2 | (0) |
| 2012–2013 | Portugal U19 | 9 | (2) |
| 2012–2014 | Portugal U20 | 14 | (1) |
| 2014–2017 | Portugal U21 | 12 | (2) |
| 2016 | Portugal Olympic | 5 | (0) |
| 2017 | Portugal | 1 | (0) |
| 2023–2024 | Guinea-Bissau | 5 | (0) |
- * Club domestic league appearances and goals as of 4 February 2026

Edgar Miguel Ié (European Portuguese: [ɛðˈɣaɾ ˈjɛ]; born 1 May 1994) is a Bissau-Guinean professional footballer who plays primarily as a central defender but also as a right-back for Liga Portugal 2 club Feirense.

After making one substitute appearance for Barcelona, he went on to play top-flight football in Portugal, France, Turkey, the Netherlands and Romania.

Ié represented Portugal at youth international level, including the under-23 team at the 2016 Olympics, and earned one senior cap in 2017. He switched to Guinea-Bissau in 2021.

== Club career ==
=== Barcelona ===
Born in Bissau, Guinea-Bissau, Ié joined Sporting CP's youth system in 2008, aged 14. In summer 2012, after concluding his development, he moved to Barcelona in Spain alongside his teammate and compatriot Agostinho Cá.

In Catalonia, Ié started playing with the B team in the Segunda División. He made his official debut on 8 December 2012, playing ten minutes in a 1–1 home draw against Elche.

Ié made his only competitive appearance for Barcelona's main squad on 3 December 2014, coming on for Jérémy Mathieu for the last 27 minutes of a 4–0 win at Huesca in the last 32 of the Copa del Rey. On 27 August 2015, he signed a three-year deal at Villarreal, being assigned to the reserves in the Segunda División B. He appeared moderately often in a season which ended with a play-off berth, being sent off alongside Anton Shvets on 3 April in a 1–0 away victory over Valencia Mestalla.

=== Belenenses ===
On 26 December 2016, Ié returned to Lisbon, signing for Belenenses. He made his Primeira Liga debut the following 27 January, playing the full 90 minutes of a 1–0 away defeat of Boavista.

=== Lille ===
On 5 July 2017, Ié transferred to French club Lille for €3 million, the highest transfer fee Belenenses ever received for a player. He scored his only goal in Ligue 1 on 28 January 2018, helping the hosts beat Strasbourg 2–1 by heading home a corner kick from Anwar El Ghazi in injury time.

Ié was loaned to Nantes also of the French top division in late January 2019.

=== Trabzonspor ===
On 12 August 2019, Ié signed a three-year contract with Trabzonspor of the Turkish Süper Lig as part of the deal involving Yusuf Yazıcı. He was loaned to Feyenoord four days later, making his Eredivisie debut on the 18th in a 1–1 home draw against Utrecht.

On 21 December 2021, Ié suffered a right knee anterior cruciate ligament injury in a 2–1 win at Altay, ruling him out for six months and therefore ending his season. Days later, he was released.

=== Later career ===
Having been unemployed for over a year, Ié remained in Turkey's top division, signing an 18-month contract on 23 January 2023 with İstanbul Başakşehir. He was an unused substitute on 11 June as his team lost the Turkish Cup final 2–0 to Fenerbahçe.

After playing only eight total games, Ié terminated his contract in January 2024. He then moved to Dinamo București, 15th in Romania's Liga I. In May, the press announced that the latter had launched an investigation following accusations that he had sent his twin brother, Edelino, to play for the club instead; Dinamo denied this had ever taken place, and he was released at the end of the campaign.

Ié returned to Portugal for 2025–26 after eight years away, joining Liga Portugal 2 side Feirense.

== International career ==
Ié was initially selected by Portugal for the 2012 UEFA European Under-19 Championship, but missed the tournament in Estonia due to injury; eventually, he won 37 caps at youth level, including 12 for the under-21 team. Coach Rui Jorge named him in the under-23 team that reached the quarter-finals of the 2016 Olympic tournament in Brazil.

Ié first appeared with the full side on 10 November 2017, replacing Pepe for the last 34 minutes of the 3–0 friendly win over Saudi Arabia in Viseu. In September 2021, however, he switched his allegiance to Guinea-Bissau, being selected on 5 November for 2022 FIFA World Cup qualifiers against Guinea and Sudan. He missed the 2021 Africa Cup of Nations through injury.

Ié made his debut for Guinea-Bissau on 14 June 2023, in a 1–0 away defeat of São Tomé and Príncipe for the 2023 Africa Cup of Nations qualifying phase.

== Personal life ==
Ié's twin brother, Edelino, was also a footballer. A midfielder, he too came through the youth teams at Sporting.

== Career statistics ==
=== Club ===
As of 1 April 2024

Appearances and goals by club, season and competition
| Club | Season | League | | | National Cup (Note: Includes appearances in Copa del Rey, Coupe de France, KNVB Beker and Turkish Cup) | | League Cup (Note: Includes appearances in Coupe de la Ligue) | | Continental | | Other | | Total | |
| Club | Season | Division | Apps | Goals | Apps | Goals | Apps | Goals | Apps | Goals | Apps | Goals | Apps | Goals |
|---|---|---|---|---|---|---|---|---|---|---|---|---|---|---|
| Barcelona B | 2012–13 | Segunda División | 6 | 0 | — | | — | | — | | — | | 6 | 0 |
| Barcelona B | 2013–14 | Segunda División | 13 | 0 | — | | — | | — | | — | | 13 | 0 |
| Barcelona B | 2014–15 | Segunda División | 29 | 0 | — | | — | | — | | — | | 29 | 0 |
| Barcelona B | Total | | 48 | 0 | 0 | 0 | 0 | 0 | 0 | 0 | 0 | 0 | 48 | 0 |
| Barcelona | 2014–15 | La Liga | 0 | 0 | 1 | 0 | — | | 0 | 0 | — | | 1 | 0 |
| Villarreal B | 2015–16 | Segunda División B | 17 | 0 | — | | — | | — | | — | | 17 | 0 |
| Villarreal B | 2016–17 | Segunda División B | 14 | 0 | — | | — | | — | | — | | 14 | 0 |
| Villarreal B | Total | | 31 | 0 | 0 | 0 | 0 | 0 | 0 | 0 | 0 | 0 | 31 | 0 |
| Belenenses | 2016–17 | Primeira Liga | 12 | 0 | 0 | 0 | — | | 0 | 0 | — | | 12 | 0 |
| Lille | 2017–18 | Ligue 1 | 35 | 1 | 0 | 0 | 2 | 0 | 0 | 0 | — | | 37 | 1 |
| Lille | 2018–19 | Ligue 1 | 7 | 0 | 2 | 0 | 1 | 0 | 0 | 0 | — | | 10 | 0 |
| Lille | Total | | 42 | 1 | 2 | 0 | 3 | 0 | 0 | 0 | 0 | 0 | 47 | 1 |
| Lille B | 2018–19 | Championnat National 2 | 1 | 0 | — | | — | | — | | — | | 1 | 0 |
| Nantes (loan) | 2018–19 | Ligue 1 | 9 | 0 | 2 | 0 | 0 | 0 | 0 | 0 | — | | 11 | 0 |
| Feyenoord (loan) | 2019–20 | Eredivisie | 11 | 0 | 2 | 0 | — | | 6 (Note: Appearances in UEFA Europa League) | 0 | — | | 19 | 0 |
| Trabzonspor | 2020–21 | Süper Lig | 38 | 2 | 1 | 0 | — | | 0 | 0 | 1 (Note: Includes appearances in Turkish Super Cup) | 0 | 40 | 2 |
| Trabzonspor | 2021–22 | Süper Lig | 17 | 0 | 0 | 0 | — | | 4 (Note: Appearances in UEFA Europa Conference League) | 1 | — | | 21 | 1 |
| Trabzonspor | Total | | 55 | 2 | 1 | 0 | 0 | 0 | 4 | 1 | 1 | 0 | 61 | 3 |
| İstanbul Başakşehir | 2022–23 | Süper Lig | 3 | 0 | 1 | 0 | — | | 1 | 0 | — | | 5 | 0 |
| İstanbul Başakşehir | 2023–24 | Süper Lig | 2 | 0 | 1 | 0 | — | | 0 | 0 | — | | 2 | 0 |
| İstanbul Başakşehir | Total | | 5 | 0 | 2 | 0 | 0 | 0 | 1 | 0 | 0 | 0 | 8 | 0 |
| Dinamo București | 2023–24 | Liga I | 5 | 0 | — | | — | | — | | — | | 5 | 0 |
| Career total | | | 219 | 3 | 10 | 0 | 3 | 0 | 11 | 1 | 1 | 0 | 244 | 4 |

=== International ===
Appearances and goals by national team and year
| National team | Year | Apps | Goals |
|---|---|---|---|
| Portugal | 2017 | 1 | 0 |
| Total | | 1 | 0 |
| Guinea-Bissau | 2023 | 1 | 0 |
| Guinea-Bissau | 2024 | 4 | 0 |
| Total | | 5 | 0 |

== Honours ==
Barcelona

- Copa del Rey: 2014–15

Trabzonspor

- Turkish Super Cup: 2020

İstanbul Başakşehir

- Turkish Cup runner-up: 2022–23
