= Lewis Baker (footballer) =

English footballer (born 1995)

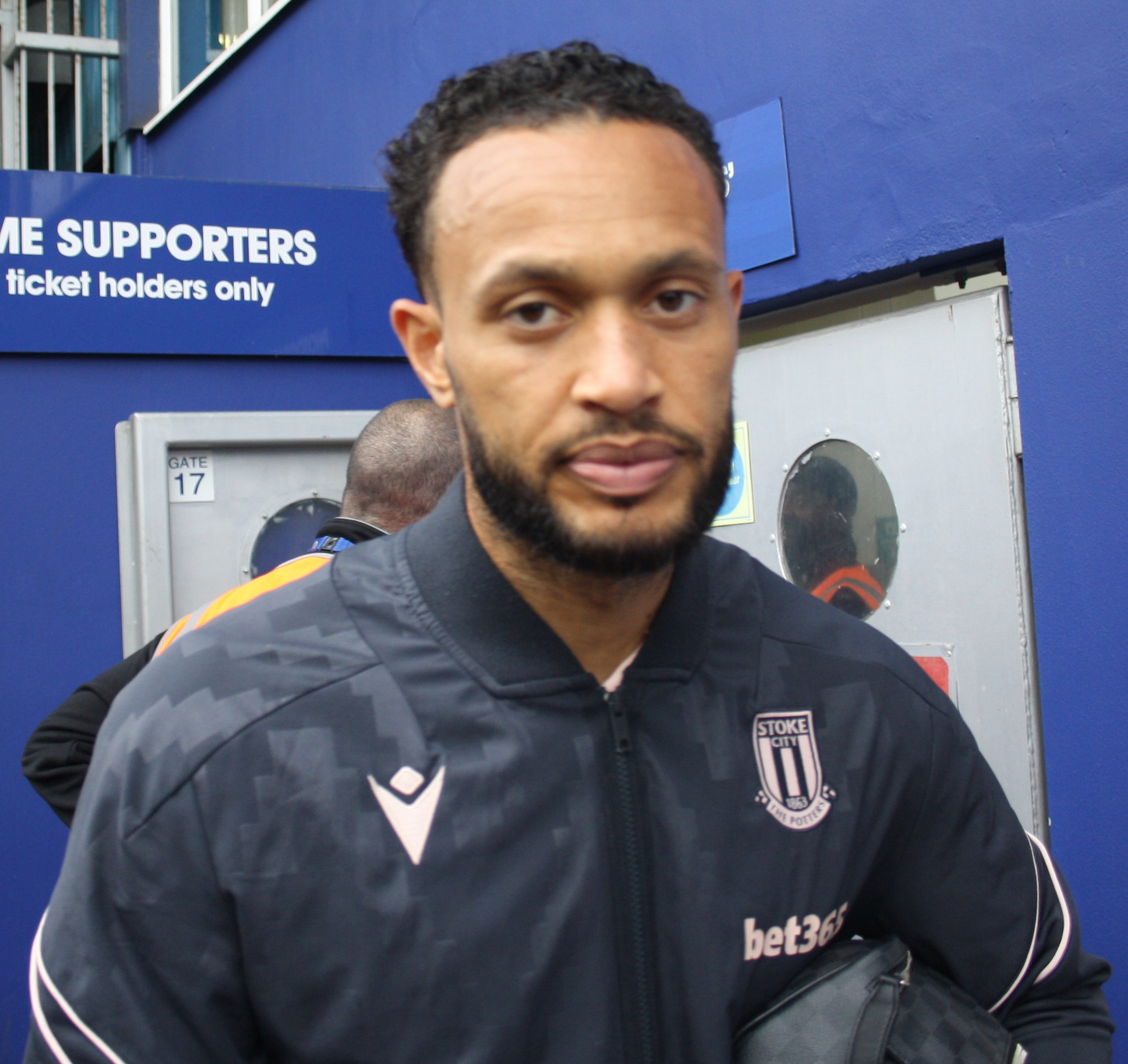
- Baker with Stoke City in 2025

Personal information
- Full name: Lewis Renard Baker
- Date of birth: 25 April 1995 (age 31)
- Place of birth: Luton, England
- Height: 6 ft 0 in (1.82 m)
- Position: Midfielder

Team information
- Current team: Bursaspor
- Number: 42

Youth career
- 2004–2005: Luton Town
- 2005–2014: Chelsea

Senior career*
Years	Team	Apps	(Gls)
2014–2022	Chelsea	0	(0)
2015	→ Sheffield Wednesday (loan)	4	(0)
2015	→ Milton Keynes Dons (loan)	12	(3)
2015–2017	→ Vitesse (loan)	64	(15)
2017–2018	→ Middlesbrough (loan)	12	(1)
2018–2019	→ Leeds United (loan)	11	(0)
2019	→ Reading (loan)	19	(1)
2019–2020	→ Fortuna Düsseldorf (loan)	8	(0)
2020–2021	→ Trabzonspor (loan)	34	(2)
2022–2026	Stoke City	121	(27)
2024–2025	→ Blackburn Rovers (loan)	13	(1)
2026–	Bursaspor	0	(0)

International career
2011	England U17	7	(1)
2013–2014	England U19	14	(9)
2014–2015	England U20	7	(1)
2015–2017	England U21	17	(8)
- * Club domestic league appearances and goals as of 20:51, 21 April 2026 (UTC)

Lewis Renard Baker (born 25 April 1995) is an English professional footballer who plays as a midfielder for TFF 1. Lig club Bursaspor.

Baker joined Chelsea from Luton Town at a young age progressing through the youth teams, making his first team debut in January 2014. He gained experience out on loan at Sheffield Wednesday and Milton Keynes Dons before spending a two year loan at Dutch club Vitesse. Baker continued to go out on loan playing for Middlesbrough, Leeds United, Reading, German side Fortuna Düsseldorf and Turkish club Trabzonspor. After briefly returning to the Chelsea first team in January 2022, Baker signed for Stoke City on a permanent basis.

== Club career ==
=== Chelsea ===
Baker joined Chelsea as a nine-year-old in 2005, having previously attended Luton Town's centre of excellence and attracted the attention of Queens Park Rangers, Charlton Athletic, Aston Villa, Derby County, Wimbledon, and Arsenal. He subsequently progressed through Chelsea's academy and reserve teams.

On 5 January 2014, Baker made his professional debut as an 87th-minute substitute for Oscar in a 2–0 FA Cup third round win over Derby County at Pride Park. On 24 April 2014, Baker scored a goal against Arsenal Under 21 in the Professional U21 Development League, which was voted to be the goal of the season.

Baker became a permanent member of Chelsea's first team squad at the beginning of the 2014–15 season. He was named on the bench for Chelsea's games against Bolton Wanderers and Shrewsbury Town in the League Cup, but he did not make an appearance in either match. Although Baker did not make a single appearance before his loan moves, Chelsea manager Jose Mourinho stated that he would receive a winner's medal for his contributions that season.

=== Loan spells ===
==== Sheffield Wednesday ====
On 8 January 2015, Baker was loaned to Sheffield Wednesday until 2 May 2015. He made his league debut as a second-half substitute, replacing Jacques Maghoma in the Owls' 2–0 away win at Nottingham Forest two days later. On 27 January 2015, he made his first start against Birmingham City which ended 0–0 draw. On 10 February 2015, he was recalled by his parent club after spending a month in Sheffield and making four appearances.

==== Milton Keynes Dons ====
On 25 February 2015, Baker joined Milton Keynes Dons on loan until the end of the season. After making his debut in a 2–1 loss to Coventry City, he scored his first senior goal on his second appearance for the club, in a 2–1 defeat at home to Chesterfield. On 21 March, he scored his second goal for the club during a 4–1 win at home to Notts County, keeping alive the club's chances of automatic promotion. MK Dons's manager, Karl Robinson, praised Baker and stated that he is "one of the hardest working players he's ever worked with". On 14 April 2015 during the game against Fleetwood Town, Baker hit the crossbar in the first half; but in the second half, he scored the opening goal as MK Dons went on to win 3–0. His form, playing alongside Dele Alli in midfield, helped MK Dons gain promoted from League One by finishing the 2014–15 season as runners-Up.

==== Vitesse ====
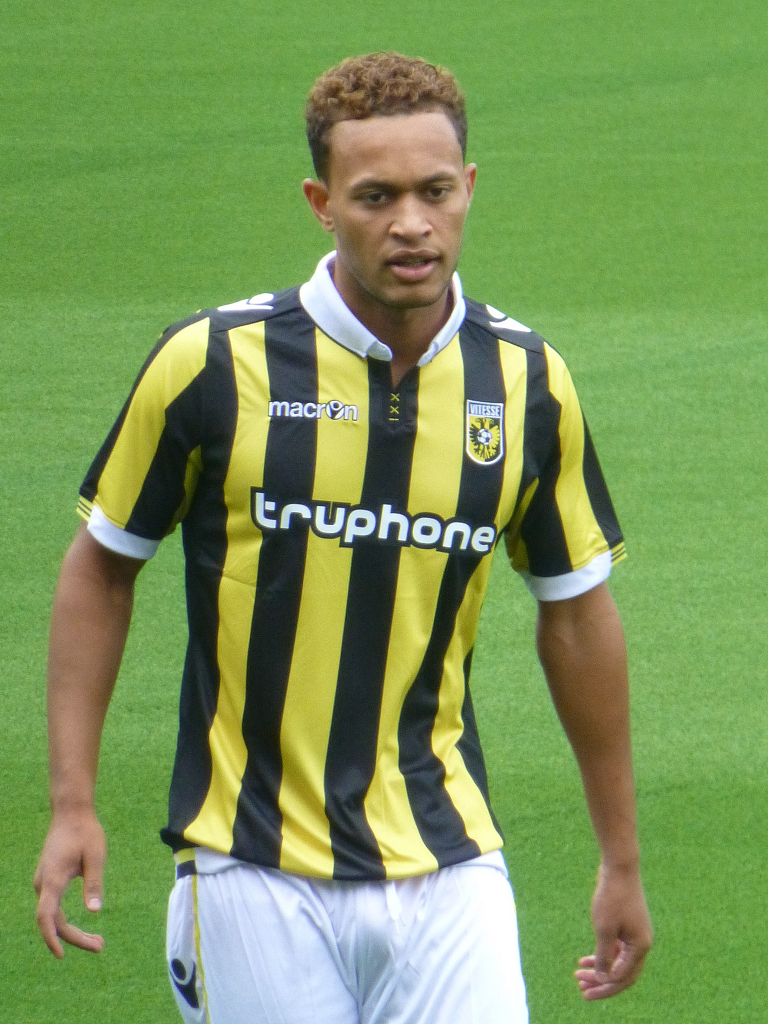
Baker with Vitesse in 2015

On 26 June 2015, Baker joined Dutch club Vitesse on a season-long loan to gain first team experience abroad. On 4 July 2015, he made his debut for Vitesse in a friendly against KV Oostende, playing the first half. He made his competitive debut 26 days later in a UEFA Europa League third qualifying round first leg against Southampton at St. Mary's, playing the full 90 minutes of a 3–0 defeat.

On 9 August, Baker made his Eredivisie debut in a 1–1 draw against Willem II where he played the full 90 minutes; five days later he scored a penalty after Ard van Peppen's handball to open a 3–0 home victory over Roda JC. On 30 August, he scored the opener of a 4–1 victory over SC Cambuur, he also had another goal ruled out. On 18 October, he again scored the opener in a 5–1 victory over PEC Zwolle. On 21 February 2016, he scored late in the game against De Graafschap, saving Vitesse from a loss to their local rivals. At the end of the season, this goal was voted Goal of the Season at the Dutch club. On 3 April, he set a record for the season creating nine chances in a single game; he also scored a magnificent free-kick from 27 yards, but his performance was not enough to save Vitesse from a 2–1 loss against NEC.

On 24 June 2016, Baker's loan at Vitesse was extended for the 2016–17 campaign. Baker continued his role in the three-man midfield in the first match of the season against Willem II in a 4–1 win. On 20 August 2016, Baker scored his first goal of the season in a 1–0 win against Roda JC. On 14 December 2016, Baker scored his 10th goal of the season in a KNVB Cup tie against fifth tier side, Jodan Boys. The game resulted in a 4–0 victory for Vitesse, with Baker slotting home a penalty in the 52nd minute. On 28 December 2016, The Guardian named Baker as one of 10 rising stars to watch in 2017. On 15 January 2017, Baker was sent off in a controversial decision in Vitesse's 3–1 victory over Twente, in which he also scored his side's first goal. On 1 March 2017, Baker scored twice in a 2–1 victory over Sparta Rotterdam to send Vitesse to the KNVB Cup final for the first time in twenty-seven years.

He played as Vitesse won the final of the KNVB Beker 2–0 against AZ on 30 April 2017 to lead the club, three-time runners up, to the title for the first time in its 125-year history.

==== Middlesbrough ====
On 11 August 2017, after signing a new five-year deal with Chelsea, Baker joined Championship side Middlesbrough on a season-long loan. He scored his first goal for Middlesbrough in an EFL Cup tie against Scunthorpe United on 22 August 2017. He scored his first in the league for Middlesbrough in a 3–2 win against Queens Park Rangers on 16 September 2017. After featuring more regularly under then manager Garry Monk, making 12 appearances in all competition by the end of October, with Monk's dismissal, Baker only featured twice under new manager Tony Pulis during the remainder of the season, making a total of 14 appearances in all competitions.

==== Leeds United ====
On 30 June 2018, Baker joined Leeds United on loan for the 2018–19 season. With Baker becoming new head coach Marcelo Bielsa's first signing for Leeds. He made his debut for Leeds in the opening game of the season on 5 August 2018, as a substitute against Stoke City at Elland Road in a 3–1 win. On 14 August, Baker made his first start for Leeds, starting for Leeds in an EFL Cup match against Bolton Wanderers. After making all his prior league appearances as a substitute, on 27 November 2018 Baker made his first start in the league for Leeds in a 1–0 win against Reading. After making 14 appearances for Leeds in the first half of the season he was recalled by Chelsea.

==== Reading ====
On 9 January 2019, Baker was recalled from Leeds United and sent on loan to Reading until the end of the 2018–19 season. Baker played more regularly with the Royals, making 19 appearances, scoring once against Hull City.

=== Fortuna Düsseldorf ===
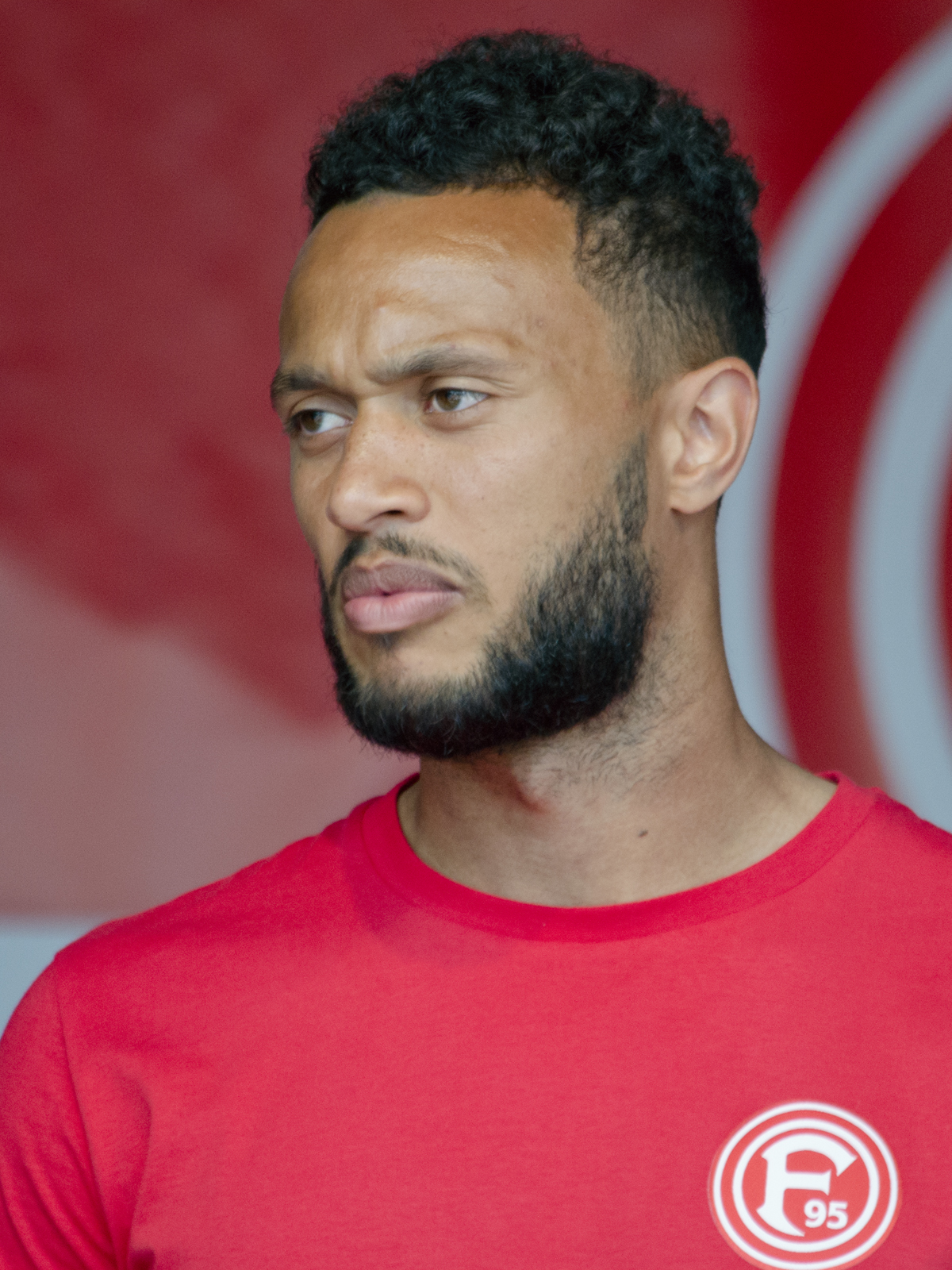
Baker with Fortuna Düsseldorf in 2019

On 24 July 2019, Baker joined Bundesliga club Fortuna Düsseldorf on loan for the 2019–20 season His loan with Fortuna Düsseldorf was cancelled in January 2020, after making nine appearances.

==== Trabzonspor ====
On 18 September 2020, Baker continued his loan journey this time with the Turkish side Trabzonspor until the end of 2020–21 season. One day later, on 19 September, he made his club debut as a starter in a 0–0 draw against Denizlispor. Baker was a regular at Trabzonspor, playing 36 times and helped them to beat İstanbul Başakşehir in the 2020 Turkish Super Cup.

=== Return to Chelsea ===
After failing to gain a move away from Chelsea in the 2021 summer transfer window Baker played for Chelsea U23s in the EFL Trophy. On 8 January 2022, Baker made his second appearance for Chelsea, his first since 2014, as a substitute in an 5–1 FA Cup win over Chesterfield.

=== Stoke City ===
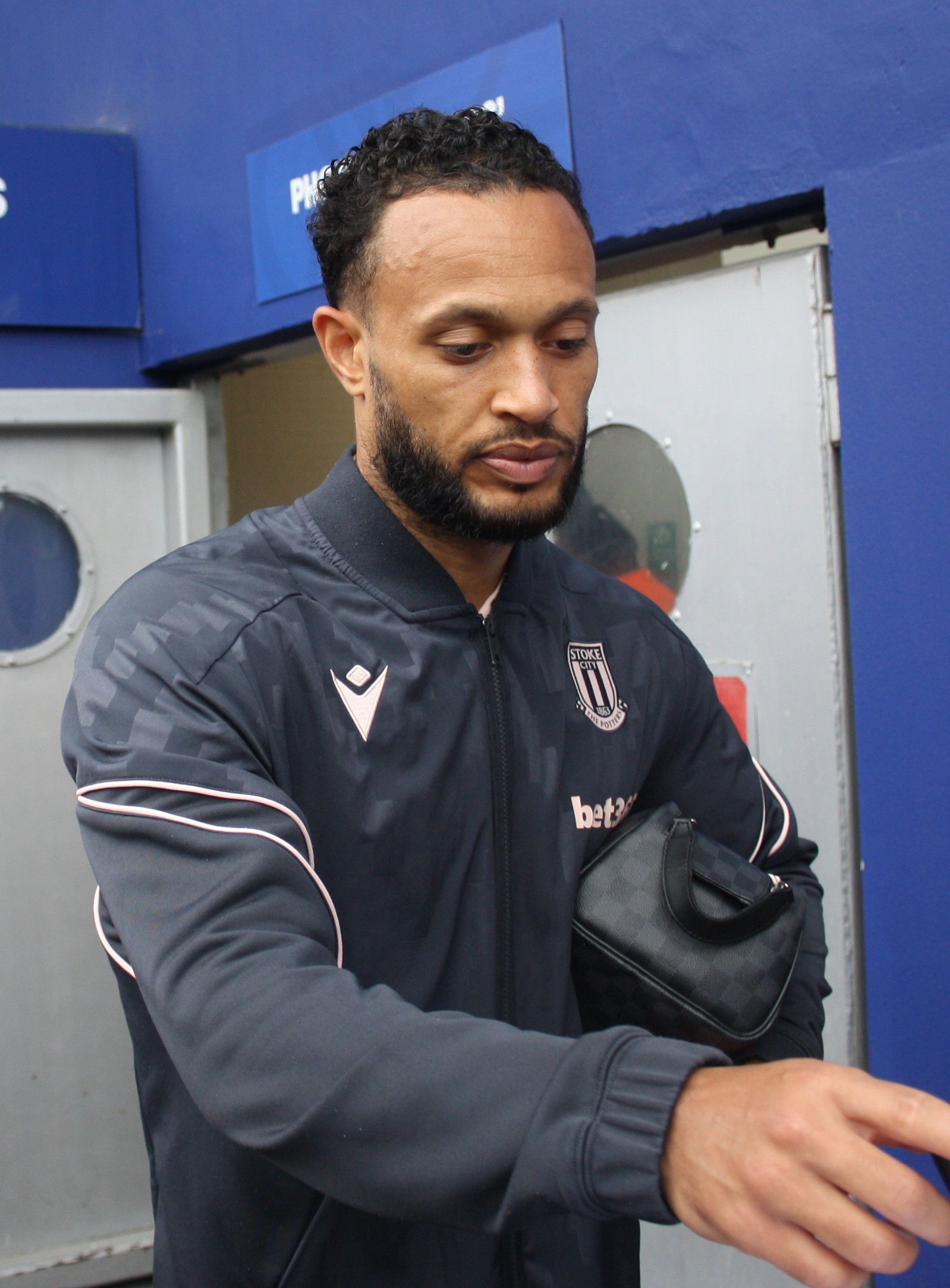
Baker in 2025

On 15 January 2022, Baker joined EFL Championship side Stoke City on a two-and-a-half-year contract. On 16 January, he made his debut for the club as a substitute in a 2–0 win over Hull City. He scored his first goal for Stoke on 22 January 2022 in a 3–2 defeat against Fulham. Baker had a productive start to his Stoke career, scoring eight goals in 21 appearances in the second half of the 2021–22 season. In June 2022, Baker signed a new three-year contract with the club. Baker was appointed club captain for the 2022–23 season. Having started the campaign as a key player in the team, Baker fell out of favour under new manager Alex Neil in the second half of the season being used mainly as a substitute. Baker ended the season with eight goals in 47 appearances of which 16 were as a substitute.

Ahead of the 2023–24 season, Baker was stripped of the captain's armband by Neil and handed to Josh Laurent. Baker missed the first four months of the season after undergoing knee surgery over the summer, returning to the squad in December 2023. He scored a long range free-kick against Rotherham United on 13 January 2024. On 29 August 2024, Baker joined Blackburn Rovers on loan for the 2024–25 season. Baker made 13 appearances for Rovers, scoring once before he was recalled by Stoke on 8 January 2025. Baker made a big impact back at Stoke, scoring seven goals in 22 games helping Stoke avoid relegation on the final day. At the end of the season, he signed a new one-year contract.

In 2025–26 Baker started well scoring four goals in the opening few months as Stoke challenged at the top of the table. However, he suffered an ankle injury in November 2025, which ruled him out until April 2026; by this time, Stoke had fallen out of play-off contention. On 14 May 2026, the club announced he would be leaving in the summer when his contract expired.

=== Bursaspor ===
On 29 June 2026, Baker agreed to return to Turkey, joining TFF 1. Lig club Bursaspor.

== International career ==
Baker was born in England and is of Jamaican descent. Baker has represented England at under-17, under-19 and England under-20 levels. In August 2014, he was called up to the England under-20 squad and named as captain of the side for the forthcoming season, making a goalscoring debut against Romania on 5 September. In October 2014, he was called up to the England under-21 squad for the first time for a two legged 2015 European U21 Championship play-off tie against Croatia. In 2016, Baker was part of the England squad for the Toulon Tournament and scored the opening goal in the 2–1 victory over France in the final. His tally of four goals throughout the competition also earned him the Golden Boot award.

On 19 May 2025, Baker made the preliminary 60-man squad for the Jamaica national team for the 2025 CONCACAF Gold Cup.

== Personal life ==
Baker's father Audley, is a six-time world powerlifting champion and was the first powerlifter to win four consecutive world titles.

== Career statistics ==
As of match played 21 April 2026

Appearances and goals by club, season and competition
Club	Season	League			National cup (Note: Includes FA Cup, KNVB Cup, DFB-Pokal, Turkish Cup)		League cup (Note: Includes EFL Cup)		Europe		Other		Total	
Club	Season	Division	Apps	Goals	Apps	Goals	Apps	Goals	Apps	Goals	Apps	Goals	Apps	Goals
Chelsea	2013–14	Premier League	0	0	1	0	0	0	0	0	0	0	1	0
Chelsea	2014–15	Premier League	0	0	0	0	0	0	0	0	0	0	0	0
Chelsea	2015–16	Premier League	0	0	0	0	0	0	0	0	0	0	0	0
Chelsea	2016–17	Premier League	0	0	0	0	0	0	—		—		0	0
Chelsea	2017–18	Premier League	0	0	0	0	0	0	0	0	0	0	0	0
Chelsea	2018–19	Premier League	0	0	0	0	0	0	0	0	0	0	0	0
Chelsea	2019–20	Premier League	0	0	0	0	0	0	0	0	0	0	0	0
Chelsea	2020–21	Premier League	0	0	0	0	0	0	0	0	0	0	0	0
Chelsea	2021–22	Premier League	0	0	1	0	0	0	0	0	0	0	1	0
Chelsea	Total		0	0	2	0	0	0	0	0	0	0	2	0
Sheffield Wednesday (loan)	2014–15	Championship	4	0	0	0	0	0	—		—		4	0
Milton Keynes Dons (loan)	2014–15	League One	12	3	0	0	0	0	—		—		12	3
Vitesse (loan)	2015–16	Eredivisie	31	5	1	0	—		2 (Note: Appearances in UEFA Europa League)	0	—		34	5
Vitesse (loan)	2016–17	Eredivisie	33	10	6	5	—		—		—		39	15
Vitesse (loan)	Total		64	15	7	5	—		2	0	—		73	20
Middlesbrough (loan)	2017–18	Championship	12	1	0	0	2	1	—		—		14	2
Leeds United (loan)	2018–19	Championship	11	0	1	0	2	0	—		—		14	0
Reading (loan)	2018–19	Championship	19	1	0	0	0	0	—		—		19	1
Fortuna Düsseldorf (loan)	2019–20	Bundesliga	8	0	1	0	—		—		—		9	0
Trabzonspor (loan)	2020–21	Süper Lig	34	2	1	0	—		—		1 (Note: Appearance in Turkish Super Cup)	0	36	2
Chelsea U23	2021–22	—			—		—		—		4 (Note: Appearance in EFL Trophy)	1	4	1
Stoke City	2021–22	Championship	21	8	0	0	0	0	—		—		21	8
Stoke City	2022–23	Championship	44	7	3	1	1	0	—		—		48	8
Stoke City	2023–24	Championship	20	2	1	1	0	0	—		—		21	3
Stoke City	2024–25	Championship	19	6	2	1	1	0	—		—		22	7
Stoke City	2025–26	Championship	17	4	0	0	1	0	—		—		18	4
Stoke City	Total		121	27	6	3	3	0	—		—		130	30
Blackburn Rovers (loan)	2024–25	Championship	13	1	0	0	0	0	—		—		13	1
Career total			299	50	18	8	7	1	2	0	5	1	331	60

== Honours ==
Chelsea Youth

- Professional U21 Development League: 2013-14

Milton Keynes Dons

- Football League One runner-up: 2014–15

Vitesse

- KNVB Cup: 2016–17

Trabzonspor

- Turkish Super Cup: 2020

England U21

- Toulon Tournament: 2016

Individual

- NextGen Series Player of the Tournament: 2012–13
- Chelsea Young Player of the Year: 2013–14
- Chelsea Goal of the Year: 2013–14
- Toulon Tournament Golden Boot: 2016
- KNVB Cup Top scorer: 2016–17
