= Safa Kınalı =

Turkish footballer (born 1999)

Personal information
- Date of birth: 23 April 1999 (age 27)
- Place of birth: Trabzon, Turkey
- Height: 1.82 m (6 ft 0 in)
- Position: Winger

Team information
- Current team: Şanlıurfaspor
- Number: 9

Youth career
- 2006–2012: Trabzonspor
- 2012–2017: 1461 Trabzon
- 2017–2018: Trabzonspor

Senior career*
Years	Team	Apps	(Gls)
2018–2023	Trabzonspor	9	(0)
2018–2019	→ 1461 Trabzon (loan)	13	(1)
2021–2022	→ Tuzlaspor (loan)	32	(1)
2022	→ Altınordu (loan)	11	(1)
2023	→ Boluspor (loan)	10	(1)
2023	→ 1461 Trabzon (loan)	2	(0)
2023–2024	Boluspor	12	(1)
2024–2025	Kepezspor	14	(2)
2025–	Şanlıurfaspor	28	(1)
- * Club domestic league appearances and goals as of 30 November 2025

Safa Kınalı (born 23 April 1999) is a Turkish professional footballer who plays as a winger for TFF 2. Lig club Şanlıurfaspor.

== Professional career ==
Kınalı is a youth product of the academies of Trabzonspor and 1461 Trabzon. On 5 July 2018 he signed his first professional contract with Trabzonspor and shortly went on loan to 1461 Trabzon in the 2018–19 season in the TFF Third League. He returned to Trabzonspor in 2019, and made his professional debut with them in a 0–0 Süper Lig tie with Denizlispor on 19 September 2020.

Kınalı joined Tuzlaspor on loan for the 2021–22 season. He then joined Altınordu on loan for the 2022–23 season in the TFF First League on 4 July 2022. On 27 December 2022 Kınalı moved on a new loan to Boluspor.

== Personal life ==
Kınalı is distantly related to the former footballer Selahattin Kınalı.

== Honours ==
Trabzonspor

- Turkish Super Cup (1): 2020
