= Yusuf Sarı =

Turkish professional footballer (born 1998)

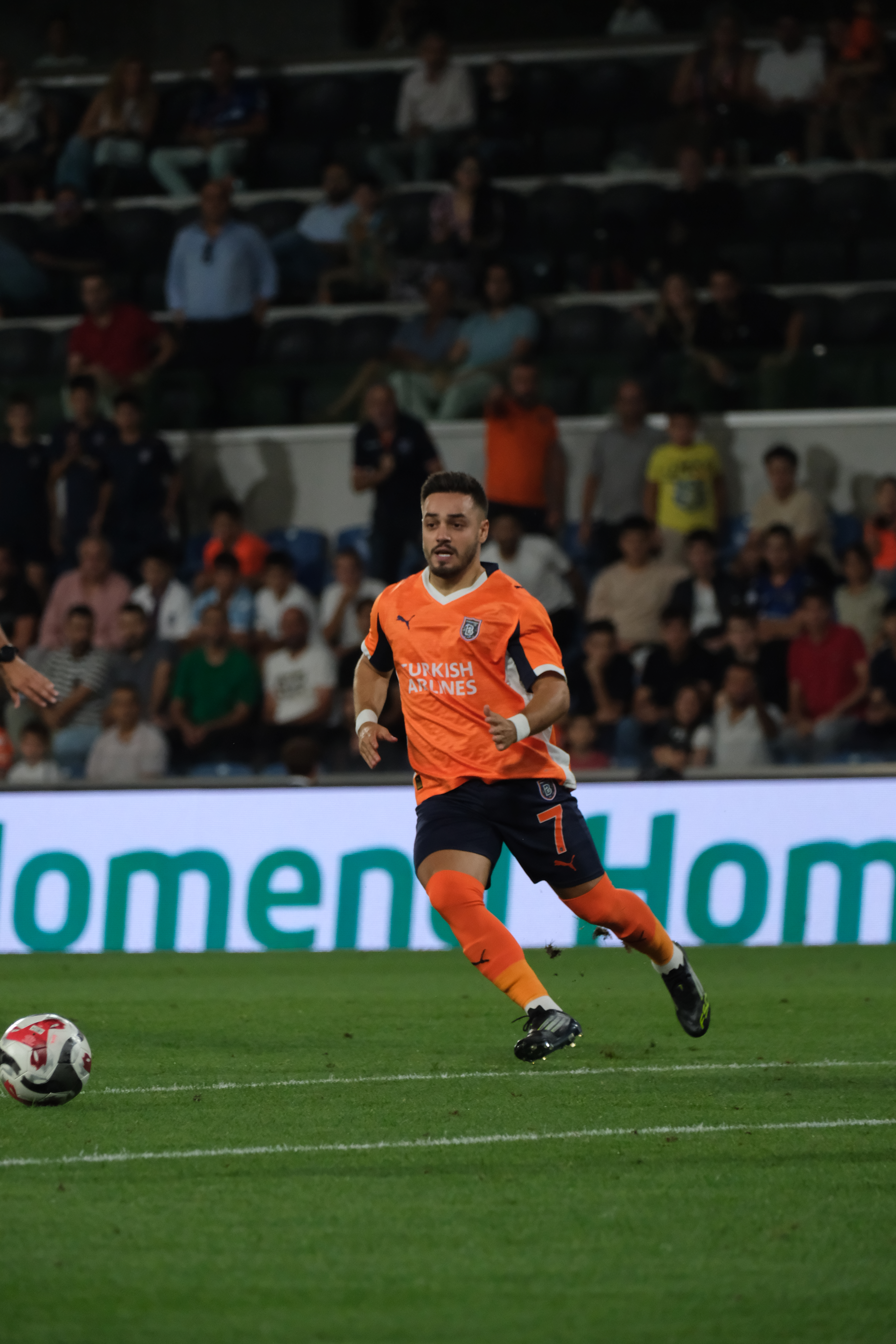

Personal information
- Full name: Yusuf Sarı
- Date of birth: 20 November 1998 (age 27)
- Place of birth: Martigues, France
- Height: 1.70 m (5 ft 7 in)
- Position: Winger

Team information
- Current team: İstanbul Başakşehir
- Number: 26

Youth career
- 2012–2015: Istres
- 2015–2017: Marseille

Senior career*
| Years | Team | Apps | (Gls) |
| 2017–2019 | Marseille B | 31 | (5) |
| 2017–2019 | Marseille | 1 | (0) |
| 2018 | → Clermont (loan) | 9 | (0) |
| 2019–2022 | Trabzonspor | 55 | (5) |
| 2022 | Çaykur Rizespor | 13 | (3) |
| 2022–2025 | Adana Demirspor | 68 | (8) |
| 2025– | İstanbul Başakşehir | 38 | (5) |

International career^{‡}
| 2018–2019 | Turkey U21 | 8 | (0) |
| 2023– | Turkey | 6 | (1) |
- * Club domestic league appearances and goals as of 10 June 2026 ‡ National team caps and goals as of 22:32, 18 November 2025 (UTC)

Yusuf Sarı (born 20 November 1998) is a Turkish professional footballer who plays as a winger for Turkish Süper Lig club İstanbul Başakşehir. Born in France, he plays for the Turkey national team.

== Club career ==
=== Marseille ===
Sarı made his professional debut for Marseille in a 2–0 Ligue 1 win over Toulouse FC on 24 September 2017.

He also made two appearances as right-winger domestic cup. One against SAS Epinal and another against Bourg-en-Bresse, where he obtained a penalty kick at the end of the game. The penalty kick was scored by his teammate Clinton N'Jie.

=== Clermont (loan) ===
On 29 August 2018, Sarı was loaned to Ligue 2 side Clermont Foot until the end of the season. But he come back to Marseille in January 2019.

=== Trabzonspor ===
Sarı did not get enough chances at Marseille and decided to move to Turkish Süper Lig club Trabzonspor. The deal was confirmed on 18 June 2019 where he signed a 3-year contract.

=== Adana Demirspor ===
On 31 May 2022, Adana Demirspor signed Sarı to a three-year contract.

=== İstanbul Başakşehir ===
On 1 January 2025, Sarı signed for İstanbul Başakşehir F.K. to a two-year contract.

== International career ==
Sarı was born in France and is of Turkish descent. He debuted for the Turkey U21s in a 3–0 2019 UEFA European Under-21 Championship qualification loss to the Sweden U21s on 23 March 2018.

Sarı was called up to the senior Turkey national team for a UEFA Euro 2024 qualifying match and friendly in September 2023. On 12 September, he made his full international debut in a 4–2 friendly loss to Japan.

On 18 November, he scored his first goal for Turkey – the winning goal from a penalty kick in a 3–2 friendly win over Germany in Berlin.

On 31 May 2026, Sarı was selected in the 26-man squad for the 2026 FIFA World Cup.

== Honours ==
Trabzonspor

- Turkish Cup (1): 2019–20
- Turkish Super Cup (1): 2020

== Career statistics ==
=== Club ===
As of 16 December 2024

Appearances and goals by club, season and competition
| Club | Season | League | | | Cup | | League Cup | | Europe | | Other | | Total | |
| Club | Season | Division | Apps | Goals | Apps | Goals | Apps | Goals | Apps | Goals | Apps | Goals | Apps | Goals |
|---|---|---|---|---|---|---|---|---|---|---|---|---|---|---|
| Marseille | 2017–18 | Ligue 1 | 1 | 0 | 3 | 0 | 0 | 0 | 0 | 0 | — | | 4 | 0 |
| Clermont (loan) | 2018–19 | Ligue 2 | 9 | 0 | 0 | 0 | 0 | 0 | — | | — | | 9 | 0 |
| Trabzonspor | 2019–20 | Süper Lig | 14 | 3 | 3 | 0 | — | | 5 | 0 | — | | 22 | 3 |
| Trabzonspor | 2020–21 | Süper Lig | 26 | 1 | 1 | 0 | — | | — | | 1 | 0 | 28 | 1 |
| Trabzonspor | 2021–22 | Süper Lig | 15 | 1 | 1 | 0 | — | | 3 | 0 | — | | 19 | 1 |
| Trabzonspor | Total | | 55 | 5 | 5 | 0 | — | | 8 | 0 | 1 | 0 | 69 | 5 |
| Çaykur Rizespor | 2021–22 | Süper Lig | 13 | 3 | — | | — | | — | | — | | 13 | 3 |
| Adana Demirspor | 2022–23 | Süper Lig | 31 | 5 | 2 | 2 | — | | — | | — | | 33 | 7 |
| Adana Demirspor | 2023–24 | Süper Lig | 24 | 3 | 0 | 0 | — | | 6 | 2 | — | | 30 | 5 |
| Adana Demirspor | 2024–25 | Süper Lig | 13 | 0 | 0 | 0 | — | | — | | — | | 13 | 0 |
| Adana Demirspor | Total | | 68 | 8 | 2 | 2 | — | | 6 | 2 | — | | 76 | 12 |
| Career total | | | 146 | 16 | 10 | 2 | 0 | 0 | 14 | 2 | 1 | 0 | 171 | 20 |

=== International ===
As of match played 18 November 2025

Appearances and goals by national team and year
| National team | Year | Apps | Goals |
|---|---|---|---|
| Turkey | 2023 | 4 | 1 |
| Turkey | 2025 | 2 | 0 |
| Total | | 6 | 1 |

Scores and results list Turkey's goal tally first, score column indicates score after each Sarı goal.

List of international goals scored by Yusuf Sarı
| No. | Date | Venue | Cap | Opponent | Score | Result | Competition |
|---|---|---|---|---|---|---|---|
| 1 | 18 November 2023 | Olympiastadion, Berlin, Germany | 3 | Germany | 3–2 | 3–2 | Friendly |
