= Ahmet Canbaz =

Turkish footballer (born 1998)

Personal information
- Date of birth: 27 April 1998 (age 28)
- Place of birth: Hanover, Germany
- Height: 1.82 m (6 ft 0 in)
- Position: Midfielder

Youth career
- Borussia Hannover
- –2013: Hannover 96
- 2013–2017: Eintracht Braunschweig

Senior career*
Years	Team	Apps	(Gls)
2016–2018	Eintracht Braunschweig II	43	(14)
2017–2018	Eintracht Braunschweig	7	(0)
2019	Werder Bremen II	10	(0)
2019–2021	Trabzonspor	8	(0)
2021	→ Ümraniyespor (loan)	7	(2)
2021–2023	Erzurumspor	9	(0)

International career
2013	Turkey U15	6	(3)
2014	Turkey U16	4	(0)
2014	Turkey U17	3	(0)
2016–2017	Turkey U19	5	(0)
2018	Turkey U20	2	(0)
2018–2020	Turkey U21	9	(0)
- * Club domestic league appearances and goals as of 21 May 2023

Ahmet Canbaz (born 27 April 1998) is a Turkish professional footballer who plays as a midfielder.

== Career ==
In December 2018, Canbaz's contract with Eintracht Braunschweig was terminated. A few days later, he joined Werder Bremen II.

== Honours ==
Trabzonspor

- Turkish Cup: 2019–20
