= Kamil Çörekçi =

Turkish footballer

Kamil Ahmet Çörekçi
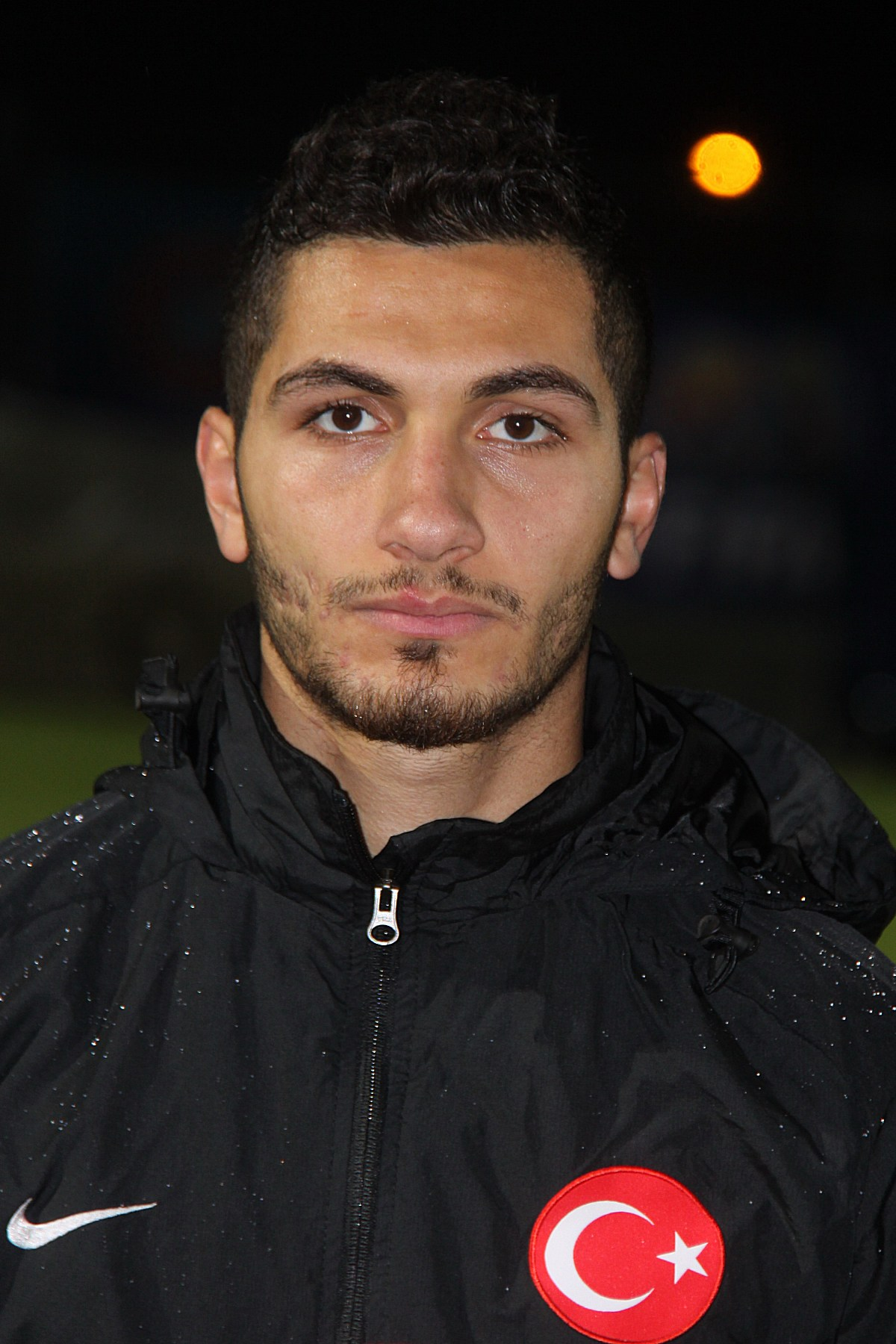

Personal information
- Full name: Kamil Ahmet Çörekçi
- Date of birth: 1 February 1992 (age 34)
- Place of birth: London, England
- Position: Right back

Team information
- Current team: Kasımpaşa
- Number: 22

Youth career
- 2001–2008: Fulham
- 2008–2010: Millwall

Senior career*
Years	Team	Apps	(Gls)
2010–2011	Bucaspor	28	(0)
2012–2014	Kayserispor	14	(0)
2013–2014	→ Adana Demirspor (loan)	15	(0)
2014–2017	Eskisehirspor	96	(1)
2017–2021	Trabzonspor	36	(0)
2021–2026	Hatayspor	105	(0)
2026–	Kasımpaşa	9	(0)

International career^{‡}
2007–2008	Turkey U16	12	(0)
2008–2009	Turkey U17	19	(1)
2009	Turkey U18	5	(1)
2011	Turkey U19	7	(1)
2011–2014	Turkey U21	20	(0)
2014–2015	Turkey B	2	(0)
- * Club domestic league appearances and goals as of 10 June 2026 ‡ National team caps and goals as of 7 January 2018

Kamil Ahmet Çörekçi (born 1 February 1992) is a footballer who plays as a right back for Süper Lig club Kasımpaşa. Born in England, he was a youth international for Turkey.

== Early life ==
Born in London, into a family of Turkish Cypriot origin. Çörekçi attended Cateram High School and was a key member of the Redbridge District team Coached by Benn Goddard. This team lifted the London Youth Games football trophy in 2006 for the first time in fifty years also winning the fair play award.

== Professional career ==
Çörekçi began his professional career playing in the youth teams of Fulham and Millwall before he joined Turkish club Bucaspor at the beginning of the 2010–2011 season. He made his professional debut on 28 November 2010.

== International career ==
Çörekçi was born in England and is of Turkish Cypriot descent. He represents Turkey internationally, and was included in the UEFA Team of the Tournament for his performance in the 2011 UEFA European Under-19 Football Championship.

== Honours ==
Trabzonspor

- Turkish Cup (1): 2019–20
- Turkish Super Cup (1): 2020
