= Serkan Asan =

Turkish footballer (born 1999)

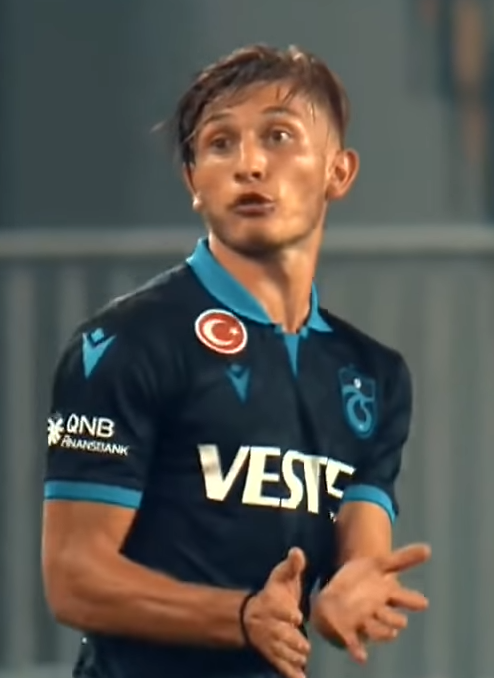
- Asan playing for Trabzonspor in 2021

Personal information
- Date of birth: 28 April 1999 (age 27)
- Place of birth: Akçaabat, Turkey
- Height: 1.70 m (5 ft 7 in)
- Position: Right-back

Team information
- Current team: Iğdır
- Number: 61

Youth career
- 2011–2018: Trabzonspor

Senior career*
Years	Team	Apps	(Gls)
2018–2025	Trabzonspor	50	(1)
2018–2019	→ 1461 Trabzon (loan)	29	(1)
2023–2024	→ Pendikspor (loan)	22	(0)
2025	→ Iğdır (loan)	8	(0)
2025–	Iğdır	16	(0)

International career^{‡}
2020	Turkey U21	3	(0)
- * Club domestic league appearances and goals as of 24 Octonber 2026 ‡ National team caps and goals as of 21:22, 18 August 2022 (UTC)

Serkan Asan (born 28 April 1999) is a Turkish professional footballer who plays as a right-back for TFF 1. Lig club Iğdır.

== Professional career ==
Asan is a youth product of the Trabzonspor academy, and signed his first professional contract with them in 2019. He began his senior career on loan with 1461 Trabzon for the 2018-19 season in the TFF Third League. He made his professional debut for Trabzonspor in a 3–1 UEFA Europa League loss to FC Krasnodar on 7 November 2019. He helped Trabzonspor win the 2021–22 Süper Lig trophy.

== International career ==
Asan is a youth international for Turkey, having played for the Turkey U21s in October 2020.

== Honours ==
Trabzonspor

- Turkish Cup: 2019–20
- Turkish Super Cup: 2020, 2022
- Süper Lig: 2021–22
