= Abdurrahim Dursun =

Turkish professional footballer

Personal information
- Date of birth: 1 December 1998 (age 27)
- Place of birth: Bayburt, Turkey
- Height: 1.76 m (5 ft 9 in)
- Position: Left back

Team information
- Current team: Gençlerbirliği
- Number: 77

Youth career
- 2010–2013: Bayburtspor
- 2013–2014: 1461 Trabzon
- 2014–2015: Trabzonspor
- 2015–2016: 1461 Trabzon
- 2016–2017: Trabzonspor

Senior career*
Years	Team	Apps	(Gls)
2017–2022	Trabzonspor	3	(0)
2018	→ Kırklarelispor (loan)	8	(0)
2019	→ 1461 Trabzon (loan)	13	(0)
2020–2021	→ Bandırmaspor (loan)	3	(0)
2021–2022	→ Boluspor (loan)	26	(0)
2022–2024	Adana Demirspor	17	(0)
2024–2024	Ankaragücü	4	(0)
2024–2025	Antalyaspor	17	(0)
2025–	Gençlerbirliği	17	(0)

International career^{‡}
2018	Turkey U20	4	(0)
2018–2019	Turkey U21	10	(0)
- * Club domestic league appearances and goals as of 10 June 2026 ‡ National team caps and goals as of 06:23, 4 October 2023 (UTC)

Abdurrahim Dursun (born 1 December 1998) is a Turkish professional footballer who plays as a left back for Süper Lig club Gençlerbirliği.

== Professional career ==
Dursun is a youth product of Bayburtspor, 1461 Trabzon and Trabzonspor. He signed his first professional contract with Trabzonspor on 31 March 2017 for 4.5 seasons. On 25 July 2018, he joined Kırklarelispor on loan. His loan was cut short, and on 18 January 2019 he moved to 1461 Trabzon on loan. On 20 September 2019, he extended his contract with Trabzonspor until 2023. He made his professional debut for Trabzonspor in a 3-1 UEFA Europa League loss to FC Krasnodar on 7 November 2019. He spent the 2020–21 season with Bandırmaspor. On 9 July 2021, he moved on loan to Boluspor for the 2021–22 season.

On 1 June 2022, Dursun moved to the Süper Lig club Adana Demirspor on a 3-year contract.

== International career ==
Dursun is a youth international for Turkey, having played up to the Turkey U21s.

== Honours ==
Trabzonspor

- Turkish Cup: 2019–20
