= Atakan Gündüz =

Turkish footballer

Personal information
- Date of birth: 1 January 2001 (age 25)
- Place of birth: Lüleburgaz, Turkey
- Height: 1.89 m (6 ft 2 in)
- Position: Defender

Team information
- Current team: Kırklarelispor
- Number: 4

Youth career
- 2013: Lüleburgazspor
- 2013–2019: Altınordu

Senior career*
Years	Team	Apps	(Gls)
2019–2022	Trabzonspor	1	(0)
2021	→ İstanbulspor (loan)	0	(0)
2022	→ 1461 Trabzon (loan)	4	(0)
2022–	Kırklarelispor	6	(0)

International career^{‡}
2015	Turkey U14	3	(0)
2015–2016	Turkey U15	7	(0)
2016–2017	Turkey U16	12	(1)
2017–2018	Turkey U17	14	(4)
2018–2019	Turkey U18	5	(2)
2019–2020	Turkey U19	6	(1)
- * Club domestic league appearances and goals as of 15 October 2022 ‡ National team caps and goals as of 19 February 2021

Atakan Gündüz (born 1 January 2001) is a Turkish professional footballer who plays as a defender for Kırklarelispor.

== Career ==
On 19 June 2019, Gündüz transferred to Trabzonspor from Altınordu. He made his professional debut for Trabzonspor in a 1-0 Süper Lig win over Başakşehir on 19 February 2021.
