= Kerem Baykuş =

Turkish footballer (born 2000)

Personal information
- Date of birth: 5 February 2000 (age 26)
- Place of birth: Düzköy, Turkey
- Height: 1.82 m (6 ft 0 in)
- Position: Midfielder

Team information
- Current team: 1461 Trabzon FK
- Number: 20

Youth career
- 2012–2019: Trabzonspor

Senior career*
Years	Team	Apps	(Gls)
2019–	Trabzonspor	0	(0)
2021	→ İstanbulspor (loan)	3	(0)
2021–	→ 1461 Trabzon FK (loan)	61	(16)

International career^{‡}
2018	Turkey U18	1	(0)
- * Club domestic league appearances and goals as of 23 September 2023 ‡ National team caps and goals as of 23 November 2019

Kerem Baykuş (born 5 February 2000) is a Turkish professional footballer who plays as a midfielder for 1461 Trabzon FK on loan from Trabzonspor.

== Professional career ==
Baykuş made his professional debut for Trabznnspor in a 3-1 UEFA Europa League loss to FC Basel on 12 December 2019.

== Honours ==
Trabzonspor

- Turkish Cup: 2019–20
