= Kağan Moradaoğlu =

Turkish footballer (born 2003)

Personal information
- Date of birth: 10 January 2003 (age 23)
- Place of birth: Trabzon, Turkey
- Height: 1.93 m (6 ft 4 in)
- Position: Goalkeeper

Youth career
- 2014–2015: 1461 Trabzon
- 2015–2019: Trabzonspor

Senior career*
| Years | Team | Apps | (Gls) |
| 2019–2024 | Trabzonspor | 1 | (0) |
| 2024–2026 | Erzurumspor | 0 | (0) |

International career^{‡}
| 2019–2020 | Turkey U17 | 2 | (0) |
| 2021–2022 | Turkey U19 | 4 | (0) |
- * Club domestic league appearances and goals as of 2 May 2026 ‡ National team caps and goals as of 29 March 2022

Kağan Moradaoğlu (born 10 January 2003) is a Turkish professional footballer who plays as a goalkeeper.

== Career ==
Moradaoğlu signed his first professional contract with Trabzonspor on 4 February 2019. All 3 of Trabzonspor's goalkeepers tested positive for COVID-19 in February 2021, causing Moradaoğlu to be summoned to the main squad from the U19s. He made his professional debut for Trabzonspor in a 1-0 Süper Lig win over Başakşehir on 19 February 2021.
