= Berat Özdemir =

Turkish footballer (born 1998)

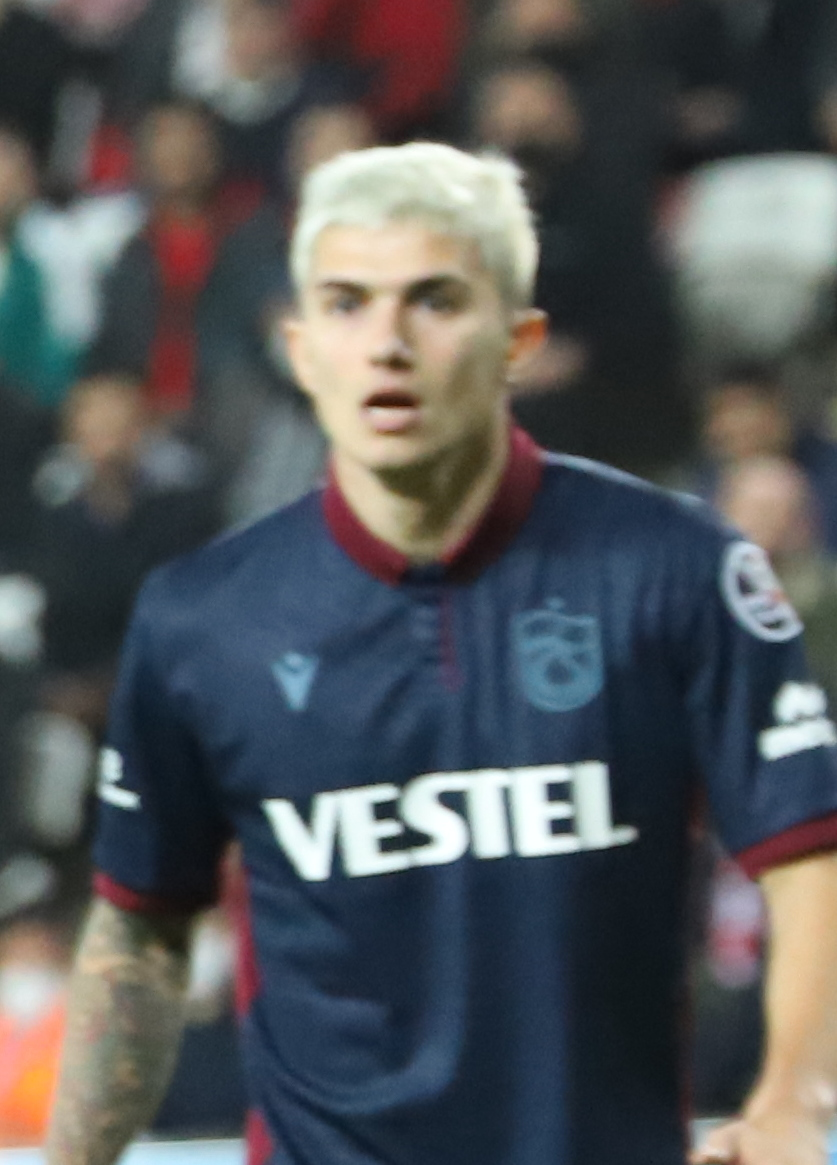
- Özdemir with Trabzonspor in 2021

Personal information
- Full name: Berat Ayberk Özdemir
- Date of birth: 23 May 1998 (age 28)
- Place of birth: Melikgazi, Turkey
- Height: 1.87 m (6 ft 2 in)
- Position: Defensive midfielder

Team information
- Current team: Çorum
- Number: 3

Youth career
- 2008–2017: Gençlerbirliği

Senior career*
Years	Team	Apps	(Gls)
2017–2021	Gençlerbirliği	54	(5)
2017–2018	→ Hacettepe (loan)	37	(2)
2021–2022	Trabzonspor	52	(0)
2022–	Al-Ettifaq	30	(1)
2023–2024	→ Trabzonspor (loan)	32	(1)
2024–2025	→ İstanbul Başakşehir (loan)	33	(0)
2025–2026	İstanbul Başakşehir	17	(0)
2026–	Çorum	6	(0)

International career^{‡}
2017	Turkey U19	2	(0)
2018–2019	Turkey U21	4	(0)
2021–	Turkey	3	(0)
- * Club domestic league appearances and goals as of 11 October 2026 ‡ National team caps and goals as of 03:54, 23 September 2021 (UTC)

Berat Ayberk Özdemir (born 23 May 1998) is a Turkish professional footballer who plays as a defensive midfielder for Süper Lig club Çorum and the Turkey national team.

== Professional career ==
Özdemir made his professional debut for Gençlerbirliği in a 1-0 Süper Lig loss to Çaykur Rizespor on 17 August 2019. On 5 January 2021, he signed a 4.5-year contract with Trabzonspor.

On 9 August 2022, Özdemir joined Saudi Arabian club Al-Ettifaq on a three-year deal. On 4 September 2023, Özdemir joined Trabzonspor on a one-year loan. On 9 August 2024, Özdemir joined İstanbul Başakşehir on a one-year loan.

== International career ==
Özdemir debuted for the Turkey national team in a 1–1 2022 FIFA World Cup qualification tie with Norway on 8 October 2021.

== Career statistics ==
=== Club ===
As of match played 25 May 2024

Appearances and goals by club, season and competition
Club	Season	League			National cup		Continental		Other		Total	
Club	Season	Division	Apps	Goals	Apps	Goals	Apps	Goals	Apps	Goals	Apps	Goals
Hacettepe (loan)	2016-17	TFF Second League	14	1	—		—		—		14	1
Hacettepe (loan)	2017-18	TFF Second League	23	1	1	0	—		—		24	1
Hacettepe (loan)	Total		37	2	1	0	—		—		38	2
Gençlerbirliği	2018-19	TFF First League	10	0	4	0	—		—		14	0
Gençlerbirliği	2019-20	Süper Lig	31	2	1	0	—		—		32	2
Gençlerbirliği	2020-21	Süper Lig	13	3	0	0	—		—		13	3
Gençlerbirliği	Total		54	5	5	0	—		—		59	5
Trabzonspor	2020-21	Süper Lig	15	0	0	0	—		1 (Note: Appearance(s) in Turkish Super Cup)	0	16	0
Trabzonspor	2021-22	Süper Lig	36	0	4	1	3 (Note: Appearance(s) in UEFA Champions League)	0	—		43	1
Trabzonspor	2022-23	Süper Lig	1	0	0	0	0	0	0	0	1	0
Trabzonspor	Total		52	0	4	1	3	0	1	0	60	1
Al-Ettifaq	2022-23	Saudi Pro League	26	1	1	0	—		—		27	1
Al-Ettifaq	2023-24	Saudi Pro League	4	0	—		—		—		4	0
Al-Ettifaq	Total		30	1	1	0	—		—		31	1
Trabzonspor (loan)	2023-24	Süper Lig	32	1	7	0	—		—		39	1
Career Total			205	9	18	1	3	0	1	0	227	10

== Honours ==
Trabzonspor

- Süper Lig: 2021–22
- Turkish Super Cup: 2020, 2022
