= 2019–20 Trabzonspor season =

Trabzonspor
2019–20 season
- President: Ahmet Ağaoğlu
- Head coach: Ünal Karaman (until 30 December 2019); Hüseyin Çimşir (from 2 January to 21 July 2020); Eddie Newton (from 23 July 2020)
- Stadium: Medical Park Stadyumu
- Süper Lig: 2nd
- Turkish Cup: Winners
- UEFA Europa League: Group stage
- Top goalscorer: League: Alexander Sørloth (24); All: Alexander Sørloth (33)
Home colours	Away colours	Third colours

The 2019–20 season was Trabzonspor's 52nd year in existence. In addition to the domestic league, the club participated in the Turkish Cup and the UEFA Europa League.

On 29 July 2020, Trabzonspor defeated Alanyaspor 2–0 to win their ninth Turkish Cup and end a ten-year trophy drought.

== Squad ==
As of 31 January 2020

Note: Flags indicate national team as defined under FIFA eligibility rules; some limited exceptions apply. Players may hold more than one non-FIFA nationality.

No.	Pos.	Nation	Player
1	GK	TUR	Uğurcan Çakır
2	DF	ENG	Kamil Çörekçi
4	DF	TUR	Hüseyin Türkmen
5	DF	IRI	Majid Hosseini
6	MF	BRA	Guilherme (on loan from Benevento)
8	MF	ARG	José Sosa (Captain)
9	FW	NGR	Anthony Nwakaeme
10	MF	TUR	Abdülkadir Ömür
11	FW	NOR	Alexander Sørloth (on loan from Crystal Palace)
13	GK	TUR	Arda Akbulut
15	MF	SEN	Badou Ndiaye (on loan from Stoke City)
16	GK	TUR	Erce Kardeşler
18	FW	ITA	Caleb Ekuban

No.	Pos.	Nation	Player
20	MF	FRA	Yusuf Sarı
22	DF	ARG	Gastón Campi
23	DF	BRA	Manoel (on loan from Cruzeiro)
27	DF	MAR	Manuel da Costa
33	DF	TUR	Abdurrahim Dursun
38	MF	GER	Ahmet Canbaz
45	FW	NED	Bilal Başaçıkoğlu
47	DF	POR	João Pereira
61	MF	TUR	Abdülkadir Parmak
77	DF	CZE	Filip Novák
90	DF	TUR	Serkan Asan
—	FW	TUR	Rahmi Anıl Başaran

=== Intaken youth players ===
Note: Flags indicate national team as defined under FIFA eligibility rules; some limited exceptions apply. Players may hold more than one non-FIFA nationality.

No.	Pos.	Nation	Player
46	DF	TUR	Ali Karnapoglu
50	MF	TUR	Kerem Baykuş
54	MF	TUR	Taha Tunç

No.	Pos.	Nation	Player
66	MF	TUR	Tunahan Ergül
67	FW	TUR	Koray Kılınç
99	FW	TUR	Muhammet Akpınar

=== Out on loan ===
Note: Flags indicate national team as defined under FIFA eligibility rules; some limited exceptions apply. Players may hold more than one non-FIFA nationality.

No.	Pos.	Nation	Player
26	MF	TUR	Fıratcan Üzüm (at Ümraniyespor until 30 June 2020)
34	MF	TUR	Behlül Aydın (at Sancaktepe FK until 30 June 2020)
41	MF	TUR	Cafer Tosun (at Sarıyer until 30 June 2020)
—	DF	TUR	Furkan Yıldırım (at Çankaya FK until 30 June 2020)
—	DF	TUR	Yunus Emre Çakır (at 24 Erzincanspor until 30 June 2020)
—	DF	TUR	Sami Can Özkan (at Muğlaspor until 30 June 2020)
—	DF	GBS	Edgar Ié (at Feyenoord until 30 June 2020)

No.	Pos.	Nation	Player
—	MF	TUR	Murat Cem Akpınar (at Hekimoğlu Trabzon until 30 June 2020)
—	MF	BIH	Nemanja Anđušić (at Balıkesirspor until 30 June 2020)
—	MF	TUR	Tunahan Ergü (at Artvin Hopaspor until 30 June 2020)
—	MF	TUR	Berkay Sefa Kara (at Kastamonuspor 1966 until 30 June 2020)
—	FW	TUR	Sertan İrkilmez (at Bayburt Özel İdarespor until 30 June 2020)
—	FW	TUR	Furkan Tütüncü (at Bayburt Özel İdarespor until 30 June 2020)
—	FW	TUR	Talha Reşat Bulut (at Çankaya FK until 30 June 2020)

=== Left during the season ===
Note: Flags indicate national team as defined under FIFA eligibility rules; some limited exceptions apply. Players may hold more than one non-FIFA nationality.

No.	Pos.	Nation	Player
7	FW	GER	Donis Avdijaj (contract terminated by mutual consent)
12	MF	NGR	John Obi Mikel (contract terminated by mutual consent)
14	MF	POR	Ivanildo Fernandes (cancelled loan)
19	FW	ENG	Daniel Sturridge (banned from football)

== Competitions ==
=== Süper Lig ===
==== League table ====
Pos	Team	Pld	W	D	L	GF	GA	GD	Pts	Qualification or relegation
1	Başakşehir (C)	34	20	9	5	65	34	+31	69	Qualification for the Champions League group stage
2	Trabzonspor (Note: Trabzonspor were banned for 1 season from all UEFA club competitions for either the 2020–21 or 2021–22 seasons by the UEFA Club Financial Control Body on 3 June 2020 due to breaches of the UEFA Financial Fair Play Regulations.)	34	18	11	5	76	42	+34	65	
3	Beşiktaş	34	19	5	10	59	40	+19	62	Qualification for the Champions League second qualifying round
4	Sivasspor	34	17	9	8	55	38	+17	60	Qualification for the Europa League group stage
5	Alanyaspor	34	16	9	9	61	37	+24	57	Qualification for the Europa League third qualifying round

Source: Süper Lig, Soccerway
Rules for classification: 1) Points; 2) Head-to-head points; 3) Head-to-head goal difference; 4) Head-to-head goals scored; 5) Goal difference; 6) Goals scored; 7) Play-off.
(C) Champions

==== Results summary ====
Overall								Home						Away					
Pld	W	D	L	GF	GA	GD	Pts	W	D	L	GF	GA	GD	W	D	L	GF	GA	GD
34	18	11	5	76	42	+34	65	9	5	3	43	22	+21	9	6	2	33	20	+13

Last updated: 25 July 2020.
Source: Soccerway

==== Results by matchday ====
Round	1	2	3	4	5	6	7	8	9	10	11	12	13	14	15	16	17	18	19	20	21	22	23	24	25	26	27	28	29	30	31	32	33	34
Ground	A	H	A	H	A	H	A	H	A	H	H	A	H	A	H	A	H	H	H	A	H	A	H	A	A	H	A	A	H	A	H	A	H	A
Result	D	W	D	D	L	W	W	W	D	L	W	W	D	W	L	W	W	W	W	W	W	D	W	D	W	D	W	D	D	W	D	L	L	W
Position	9	5	5	8	9	4	3	2	4	5	3	2	4	3	4	3	3	3	2	1	1	1	1	1	1	1	1	2	2	2	2	2	2	2

Updated to match(es) played on 25 July 2020. Source: Soccerway
A = Away; H = Home; W = Win; D = Draw; L = Loss

==== Matches ====
18 August 2019 1	Kasımpaşa	1–1	Trabzonspor	Kasımpaşa, Beyoğlu, Istanbul
21.45	Haris Hajradinović (yellow card) 3'; Aytaç Kara 40'; Jorge Fernandes (yellow card) 90'	Report	34' Alexander Sørloth	Stadium: Recep Tayyip Erdoğan Stadium; Attendance: 4.905; Referee: Cüneyt Çakır

25 August 2019 2	Trabzonspor	2–1	Yeni Malatyaspor	Trabzon
19.15	José Sosa (yellow card) 19'; Abdülkadir Ömür 44'; João Pereira 78'	Report	(yellow card) 66' Erkan Kaş; 89' Eren Tozlu; (yellow card) 90' Adis Jahović	Stadium: Şenol Güneş Stadium; Attendance: 31.815; Referee: Koray Gençerler

1 September 2019 3	Fenerbahçe	1–1	Trabzonspor	Istanbul
21.45	Garry Rodrigues 17'; Nabil Dirar (yellow card) 40'	Report	(yellow card) 8' José Sosa; 27' Caleb Ekuban; (yellow card) 75' Anthony Nwakaeme; (yellow card) 80' Uğurcan Çakır	Stadium: Şükrü Saracoğlu Stadyumu; Attendance: 43.597; Referee: Fırat Aydınus

15 September 2019 4	Trabzonspor	2–2	Gençlerbirliği	Trabzon
20.00	Filip Novák 17' (yellow card) 59'; Alexander Sørloth 57' (pen.); Majid Hosseini (yellow card) 63'	Report	(yellow card) 30' Pierre-Yves Polomat; 44' Bogdan Stancu; (yellow card) 45' Berat Özdemir; 84' Stéphane Sessègnon	Stadium: Şenol Güneş Stadium; Attendance: 27.779; Referee: Mete Kalkavan

23 September 2019 5	Sivasspor	2–1	Trabzonspor	Sivas
20.00	Fernando 41' (yellow card) 77'; Erdoğan Yeşilyurt (yellow card) 81'; Mamadou Samassa (footballer, born 1986) (yellow card) 90'; Uğur Çiftçi 90'	Report	3' (yellow card) 55' Donis Avdijaj; (yellow card) 45' Gaston Campi; (yellow card) 55' Donis Avdijaj; (penalty missed) 80' Alexander Sørloth; (yellow card) 90' Koray Kılınç	Stadium: New Sivas 4 Eylül Stadium; Attendance: 10.821; Referee: Yaşar Kemal Uğurlu

29 September 2019 6	Trabzonspor	4–1	Beşiktaş	Trabzon
19.00	Abdülkadir Parmak (yellow card) 23'; Dorukhan Toköz 31' (kk); José Sosa 41'; Mikel John Obi (yellow card) 43'; Hüseyin Türkmen (yellow card) 45+4'; Alexander Sørloth 65'; Majid Hosseini (yellow card) 75'; Uğurcan Çakır (yellow card) 76'; Filip Novák (yellow card) 86'; Anthony Nwakaeme 88'	Report	(yellow card) 33' Dorukhan Toköz; (yellow card) 36' Necip Uysal; (yellow card) 75' Gökhan Gönül; 79' Güven Yalçın	Stadium: Şenol Güneş Stadium; Attendance: 34.122; Referee: Ali Palabıyık

6 October 2019 7	Çaykur Rizespor	1–2	Trabzonspor	Rize
19.00	Dimitris Chatziisaias (yellow card) 14'; Dario Melnjak 23'; Ismaël Diomandé (yellow card) 33'; Fernando Boldrin (yellow card) 68'; Mykola Morozyuk (yellow card) 75'; Abdullah Durak (yellow card) 90+4'	Report	(yellow card) 6' John Obi Mikel; (yellow card) 14' Kamil Çörekçi; 73' Alexander Sørloth; 90' Anthony Nwakaeme	Stadium: Yeni Rize Şehir Stadium; Attendance: 7.613; Referee: Hüseyin Göçek

19 October 2019 8	Trabzonspor	4–1	Gaziantep	Trabzon
17.30	Daniel Sturridge 9'; Alexander Sørloth 14'; José Sosa (yellow card) 26' (goal) 75'; Yusuf Sari 80'	Report	54' Jefferson Nogueira Júnior; (yellow card) 84' Olarenwaju Kayode	Stadium: Şenol Güneş Stadium; Attendance: 26.923; Referee: Özgür Yankaya

28 October 2019 9	İstanbul Başakşehir	2–2	Trabzonspor	Istanbul
20.00	Martin Škrtel (yellow card) 59' (goal) 78'; Edin Višća 67' (pen.); Mahmut Tekdemir (yellow card) 71'	Report	62' (pen.) Daniel Sturridge; (yellow card) 65' Uğurcan Çakır; (yellow card) 73' Anthony Nwakaeme; 90+6' Alexander Sørloth; (yellow card) 90+7' Yusuf Sari	Stadium: Başakşehir Fatih Terim Stadium; Attendance: 5.377; Referee: Ali Palabıyık

2 November 2019 10	Trabzonspor	0–1	Göztepe	Trabzon
17.30		Report	31' (yellow card) 56' Cameron Jerome; (yellow card) 46' Soner Aydoğdu; (yellow card) 75' Mossoró	Stadium: Şenol Güneş Stadium; Attendance: 25.082; Referee: Fırat Aydınus

10 November 2019 11	Trabzonspor	1–0	Alanyaspor	Trabzon
16.30	Abdülkadir Parmak (red card) 25'; João Pereira (yellow card) 30'; Majid Hosseini 67' (penalty missed) 83'; Uğurcan Çakır (yellow card) 82'; Anthony Nwakaeme (yellow card) 90+3'; Majid Hosseini (yellow card) 90+6'	Report	(yellow card) 49' Fabrice N'Sakala; (yellow card) 81' (yellow card) 81' (red card) Júnior Fernándes; (yellow card) 82' Georgios Tzavellas	Stadium: Şenol Güneş Stadium; Attendance: 26.076; Referee: Abdulkadir Bitigen

23 November 2019 12	MKE Ankaragücü	0–3	Trabzonspor	Ankara
17.30	İlhan Parlak (yellow card) 9'; Héctor Canteros (yellow card) 36'; Ricardo Faty (yellow card) 43' (yellow card) 45+1' (red card); Alihan Kubalas (yellow card) 88'	Report	6' Alexander Sørloth; 48' Yusuf Sari; 56' Anthony Nwakaeme	Stadium: Eryaman Stadium; Attendance: 15.130; Referee: Cüneyt Çakır

1 December 2019 13	Trabzonspor	1–1	Galatasaray	Trabzon
19.00	José Sosa (yellow card) 26'; Alexander Sørloth 50'; Yusuf Sari (yellow card) 72'; Uğurcan Çakır (yellow card) 85'; Gastón Campi (yellow card) 86'; João Pereira (yellow card) MS'	Report	(yellow card) 26' Ömer Bayram; (yellow card) 40' Steven Nzonzi; (yellow card) 66' Marcão; 90' Yuto Nagatomo	Stadium: Şenol Güneş Stadium; Attendance: 37.271; Referee: Ali Palabıyık

8 December 2019 14	Antalyaspor	1–3	Trabzonspor	Antalya
16.30	Ondřej Čelůstka 17'; Hakan Özmert (yellow card) 29'; Serdar Özkan (yellow card) 87'	Report	3' Alexander Sørloth; 25' Anthony Nwakaeme; 44' Yusuf Sari; (yellow card) 58' Daniel Sturridge; (yellow card) 87' Serkan Asan	Stadium: New Antalya Stadium; Attendance: 15.047; Referee: Yaşar Kemal Uğurlu

16 December 2019 15	Trabzonspor	1–2	Denizlispor	Trabzon
20.00	Oğuz Yılmaz 21' (kk)	Report	(yellow card) 56' Mustafa Yumlu; 59', 82' Hugo Rodallega	Stadium: Şenol Güneş Stadium; Attendance: 27.899; Referee: Halis Özkahya

23 December 2019 16	Konyaspor	0–1	Trabzonspor	Konya
20.00	Ömer Ali Şahiner (yellow card) 21', (yellow card) 82' (red card); Ali Turan (yellow card) 24'; Nejc Skubic (yellow card) 69'; Selim Ay (yellow card) 90+3'	Report	38' Alexander Sørloth; (yellow card) 66' John Obi Mikel; (yellow card) 80' Yusuf Sari	Stadium: Büyükşehir Belediye Stadyumu; Attendance: 16.009; Referee: Halil Umut Meler

28 December 2019 17	Trabzonspor	6–2	Kayserispor	Trabzon
17.30	Alexander Sørloth 7'; Anthony Nwakaeme 37'; Daniel Sturridge 47'; Daniel Sturridge 66'; Abdülkadir Parmak 72'; Alexander Sørloth 90+3'	Report	43' Ömer Uzun; (yellow card) 65' Mert Kula; (yellow card) 70' Yasir Subaşı; 82' Artem Kravets	Stadium: Şenol Güneş Stadium; Attendance: 23.294; Referee: Hüseyin Göçek

19 January 2020 18	Trabzonspor	6–0	Kasımpaşa	Trabzon
16.00	João Pereira (yellow card) 16'; José Sosa 24'; Alexander Sørloth 27', 55', 88'; Anthony Nwakaeme 29', 83'	Report	(yellow card) 24' (yellow card) 46' (red card) Jorge Fernandes; (yellow card) 35' Aytaç Kara; (yellow card) 63' Zvonimir Šarlija	Stadium: Şenol Güneş Stadium; Attendance: 24.849; Referee: Zorbay Küçük

11 March 2020 19	Yeni Malatyaspor	1–3	Trabzonspor	Malatya
20.00	Mitchell Donald (yellow card) 4'; Afriyie Acquah (yellow card) 26'; Gökhan Töre (yellow card) 29'; Umut Bulut 44'	Report	10' (yellow card) 69' Filip Novák; 30' José Sosa; (yellow card) 37' Gastón Campi; 55' Anthony Nwakaeme	Stadium: Malatya Arena; Attendance: 9.571; Referee: Ali Palabıyık

1 February 2020 20	Trabzonspor	2–1	Fenerbahçe	Trabzon
20.00	Badou Ndiaye (yellow card) 7'; Alexander Sørloth 15'; Filip Novák 32'; Alexander Sørloth (yellow card) 48'; José Sosa (yellow card) 86'	Report	1' Max Kruse; (yellow card) 66' Mauricio Isla; (yellow card) 72' (yellow card) 90' (red card) Luiz Gustavo; (yellow card) 84' Ferdi Kadioglu; (yellow card) 90' Emre Belözoğlu	Stadium: Şenol Güneş Stadium; Attendance: 38.043; Referee: Ali Palabıyık

8 February 2020 21	Gençlerbirliği	0–2	Trabzonspor	Ankara
17.00	Nadir Çiftçi (yellow card) 39'; Halil Pehlivan (yellow card) 42'; Yasin Pehlivan (yellow card) 45+2'; Erdem Özgenç (yellow card) 76'; Ahmet Oğuz (yellow card) 77'; Zargo Touré (yellow card) 80'; Baiano (footballer, born 1992) (yellow card) 90+4'; Flávio Ramos (yellow card) 90+5'	Report	(yellow card) 19' Badou Ndiaye; 79' (pen.) José Sosa; 84' Anthony Nwakaeme; (red card) 90+4' Alexander Sørloth	Stadium: Eryaman Stadium; Attendance: 6.426; Referee: Hüseyin Göçek

16 February 2020 22	Trabzonspor	2–1	Sivasspor	Trabzon
16.00	Alexander Sørloth 4'; Caner Osmanpaşa 43' (kk); Doğan Erdoğan (yellow card) 84'; John Obi Mikel (yellow card) 90+1'	Report	(yellow card) 45' Marcelo Goiano; 90+2' Mustapha Yatabaré	Stadium: Şenol Güneş Stadium; Attendance: 33.843; Referee: Cüneyt Çakır

22 February 2020 23	Beşiktaş	2–2	Trabzonspor	Istanbul
20.00	Kevin-Prince Boateng 57'; Domagoj Vida 64'; Mohamed Elneny (yellow card) 79'; Necip Uysal (yellow card) 90'	Report	5', 90+1' Alexander Sørloth; (yellow card) 16' Manuel da Costa; (yellow card) 53' Gastón Campi	Stadium: Vodafone Park; Attendance: 38.696; Referee: Fırat Aydınus

29 February 2020 24	Trabzonspor	5–2	Çaykur Rizespor	Trabzon
17.00	Kamil Çörekçi (yellow card) 27'; Manuel da Costa 65'; Caleb Ekuban 71'; José Sosa 77'; John Obi Mikel (yellow card) 78' (yellow card) 90+5' (red card); Anthony Nwakaeme 86'; Badou Ndiaye 90+8'	Report	36' Dario Melnjak; (yellow card) 58' Aminu Umar; (yellow card) 69' Ismaël Diomandé; 90+6' (pen.)Milan Škoda	Stadium: Şenol Güneş Stadium; Attendance: 30.784; Referee: Abdulkadir Bitigen

7 March 2020 25	Gaziantep	1–1	Trabzonspor	Gaziantep
17.00	Olarenwaju Kayode 53'; Güray Vural (yellow card) 87'; Souleymane Diarra (yellow card) 90+6'	Report	22' Caleb Ekuban; (yellow card) 26' José Sosa; (yellow card) 42' John Obi Mikel; (yellow card) 57' Manuel da Costa; (yellow card) 87' Guilherme; (yellow card) 90+8' Abdülkadir Ömür	Stadium: New Gaziantep Stadium; Attendance: 11.917; Referee: Halis Özkahya

15 March 2020 26	Trabzonspor	1–1	İstanbul Başakşehir	Trabzon
16.00	Martin Škrtel 63' (kk); Gastón Campi (yellow card) 83'	Report	56' Demba Ba; (yellow card) 80' Mahmut Tekdemir	Stadium: Şenol Güneş Stadium; Attendance: 0 Referee: Fırat Aydınus

12 June 2020 27	Göztepe	1–3	Trabzonspor	İzmir
21.00	Alpaslan Öztürk 57' (pen.); Cameron Jerome (yellow card) 59'; Berkan Emir (yellow card) 79'	Report	16' Anthony Nwakaeme; (yellow card) 28' (red card) 41' Guilherme; 52' (pen.) Caleb Ekuban; (yellow card) 56' Manuel da Costa; 84' (pen.) Berkan Emir	Stadium: Gürsel Aksel Stadium; Attendance: 0 Referee: Zorbay Küçük

22 June 2020 28	Alanyaspor	2–2	Trabzonspor	Alanya, Antalya
21.00	Papiss Cissé 45+2'; Salih Uçan (yellow card) 45+3'; Fabrice N'Sakala (yellow card) 76' (red card) 83'; Anastasios Bakasetas 90+5'	Report	7' Abdülkadir Ömür; (yellow card) 40' Caleb Ekuban; 51' Filip Novák; (red card) 79' Majid Hosseini	Stadium: Bahçeşehir Okulları Stadium; Attendance: 0 Referee: Atilla Karaoğlan

27 June 2020 29	Trabzonspor	1–1	MKE Ankaragücü	Trabzon
21.00	Alexander Sørloth 3'; Abdülkadir Ömür (yellow card) 45+3'; João Pereira (yellow card) 52'; Gastón Campi (yellow card) 54'; José Sosa (yellow card) 61'	Report	(yellow card) 31' Michał Pazdan; (yellow card) 39' Ante Kulušić; (yellow card) 43' Sedat Ağçay; (yellow card) 45+1' Scarione; (yellow card) 57' Tiago Pinto; 63' (pen.) (yellow card) 70' (yellow card) 82' (red card) Gerson Rodrigues; (yellow card) 83' Dever Orgill	Stadium: Şenol Güneş Stadium; Attendance: 0 Referee: Abdulkadir Bitigen

5 July 2020 30	Galatasaray	1–3	Trabzonspor	Istanbul
21.00	Marcelo Saracchi (yellow card) 18'; Sofiane Feghouli (red card) 31'; Ryan Donk (yellow card) 40'; Jean Michaël Seri 90+3' (pen.)	Report	(yellow card) 30' Manuel da Costa; 41' (pen.) José Sosa; (yellow card) 63' (goal) 90+5' Alexander Sørloth; 70' Filip Novák; (yellow card) 90+2' Hüseyin Türkmen	Stadium: Türk Telekom Stadium; Attendance: 0 Referee: Cüneyt Çakır

8 July 2020 31	Trabzonspor	2–2	Antalyaspor	Trabzon
18.30	José Sosa 15' (pen.) 43' (pen.); Gastón Campi (yellow card) 83'	Report	8' (pen.) (yellow card) 76' Ufuk Akyol; (yellow card) 14' Veysel Sarı; (yellow card) 24' Amilton; (yellow card) 42' Paul Mukairu; 66' Yekta Kurtuluş; (yellow card) 85' Eren Albayrak	Stadium: Şenol Güneş Stadium; Attendance: 0 Referee: Halil Umut Meler

13 July 2020 32	Denizlispor	2–1	Trabzonspor	Denizli
21.00	Hadi Sacko 46'; Óscar Estupiñán 84'	Report	14' (yellow card) 90+5' Caleb Ekuban; (yellow card) 63' José Sosa; (yellow card) 90+4' Kamil Çörekçi	Stadium: Atatürk Stadyumu; Attendance: 0 Referee: Yaşar Kemal Uğurlu

19 July 2020 33	Trabzonspor	3–4	Konyaspor	Trabzon
21.00	Alexander Sørloth 12', 56' (pen.); Caleb Ekuban (yellow card) 25'; Filip Novák 61'; Manuel da Costa (yellow card) 87'	Report	42' Riad Bajić; 81' Levan Shengelia; 88' (pen.) Nejc Skubic; 90+2' Thuram	Stadium: Şenol Güneş Stadium; Attendance: 0 Referee: Atilla Karaoğlan

25 July 2020 34	Kayserispor	1–2	Trabzonspor	Kayseri
21:00	Cenk Şahin (yellow card) 48'; Gustavo Campanharo (yellow card) 49'; Pedro Henrique 86' (pen.)	Report	(yellow card) 8' Abdülkadir Parmak; 63' Filip Novák; 90+5' Alexander Sørloth	Stadium: Kadir Has Şehir Stadyumu; Attendance: 0 Referee: Cüneyt Çakır

=== Turkish Cup ===
4 December 2019 Fifth round first leg	Altay	1–2	Trabzonspor	Izmir
18:30	Leandrinho 55' (pen.)		Sturridge 45'; Sörloth 66'	Stadium: İzmir Atatürk

19 December 2019 Fifth round second leg	Trabzonspor	4–1	Altay	Trabzon
20:45	Sturridge 51'; Ekuban 56'; Sturridge 64'; Fernandes 71'		Paixao 83'	Stadium: Şenol Güneş Spor Kompleksi

16 January 2020 Round of 16 first leg	Trabzonspor	2–0	Denizlispor	Trabzon
21:30	Sosa 22'; Nwakaeme 80'	Report		Stadium: Şenol Güneş Spor Kompleksi; Referee: Suat Arslanboğa

23 January 2020 Round of 16 second leg	Denizlispor	2–0 (2–2 (2–4 p) agg.)	Trabzonspor	Denizli
18:00	Estupiñán 14'; Niyaz 23'	Report		Stadium: Denizli Atatürk Stadium; Referee: Ali Sansalan

4 February 2020 Quarter-final first leg	Trabzonspor	5–0	BB Erzurumspor	Trabzon
20:30	Sørloth 16', 66'; Acer 26' (o.g.); Nwakaeme 43'; Açıl 60' (o.g.)	Report		Stadium: Şenol Güneş Stadium; Referee: Abdulkadir Bitigen

13 February 2020 Quarter-final seg leg	BB Erzurumspor	1–4	Trabzonspor	Erzurum
17:30	Ayaroğlu 17'	Report	Guilherme 9', 46'; Parmak 68'; Kınalı 83'	Stadium: Kazım Karabekir Stadium; Referee: Erkan Özdamar

3 March 2020 Semi-final first leg	Trabzonspor	2–1	Fenerbahçe	Trabzon
20:30	Sørloth 46'; Novák 66'	Report	Muriqi 82'	Stadium: Şenol Güneş Stadium; Referee: Yaşar Kemal Uğurlu

16 June 2020 Semi-final second leg	Fenerbahçe	1–3	Trabzonspor	Istanbul
20:45	Türüç 42'	Report	Sørloth 6', 83'; Novák 90+2'	Stadium: Şükrü Saracoğlu Stadium; Referee: Cüneyt Çakır

29 July 2020 Final	Trabzonspor	2–0	Alanyaspor	Istanbul
21:30	Ömür 25'; Sørloth 90+10'	Report		Stadium: Atatürk Olympic Stadium; Referee: Ali Palabıyık

=== Europa League ===
==== Third qualifying round ====
8 August 2019	Sparta Prague (Czech Republic)	2–2	(Turkey) Trabzonspor	Stadion Letná, Prague
18:00	Costa 16'; Kanga 68'	Report	Ekuban 84'; Sørloth 89'	Attendance: 0 (No-crowd match); Referee: José Luis Munuera Montero (Spain)

15 August 2019	Trabzonspor (Turkey)	2–1	(Czech Republic) Sparta Prague	Şenol Güneş Stadium, Trabzon
19:30 (20:30 TRT)	Sørloth 11'; Novák 90+8'	Report	Hložek 78'	Attendance: 34,462; Referee: Jakob Kehlet (Denmark)

Trabzonspor won 4–3 on aggregate.

==== Play-off round ====
22 August 2019	AEK Athens (Greece)	1–3	(Turkey) Trabzonspor	Olympic Stadium, Athens
20:00 (21:00 EEST)	Livaja 4'	Report	Ekuban 29', 44', 70'	Attendance: 141; Referee: Daniel Siebert (Germany)

29 August 2019	Trabzonspor (Turkey)	0–2	(Greece) AEK Athens	Şenol Güneş Stadium, Trabzon
19:30 (20:30 TRT)		Report	Livaja 24'; Mantalos 30' (pen.)	Attendance: 30,490; Referee: Michael Oliver (England)

3–3 on aggregate. Trabzonspor won on away goals.

==== Group stage ====
Pos	Team	Pld	W	D	L	GF	GA	GD	Pts	Qualification	BSL	GET	KRA	TRA
1	(Switzerland) Basel	6	4	1	1	12	4	+8	13	Advance to knockout phase	—	2–1	5–0	2–0
2	(Spain) Getafe	6	4	0	2	8	4	+4	12	Advance to knockout phase	0–1	—	3–0	1–0
3	(Russia) Krasnodar	6	3	0	3	7	11	−4	9		1–0	1–2	—	3–1
4	(Turkey) Trabzonspor	6	0	1	5	3	11	−8	1		2–2	0–1	0–2	—

Source: UEFA
Rules for classification: Group stage tiebreakers

19 September 2019	Getafe (Spain)	1–0	(Turkey) Trabzonspor	Coliseum Alfonso Pérez, Getafe
18:55	Ángel 18'	Report		Attendance: 5,786; Referee: Matej Jug (Slovenia)

3 October 2019	Trabzonspor (Turkey)	2–2	(Switzerland) Basel	Şenol Güneş Stadium, Trabzon
21:00 (22:00 TRT)	Parmak 26'; Sosa 78'	Report	Widmer 20'; Okafor 80'	Attendance: 23,867; Referee: Marco Di Bello (Italy)

24 October 2019	Trabzonspor (Turkey)	0–2	(Russia) Krasnodar	Şenol Güneş Stadium, Trabzon
21:00 (22:00 TRT)		Report	Berg 49'; Vilhena 90+2'	Attendance: 26,405; Referee: Harald Lechner (Austria)

7 November 2019	Krasnodar (Russia)	3–1	(Turkey) Trabzonspor	Krasnodar Stadium, Krasnodar
18:55 (20:55 MSK)	Asan 27' (o.g.); Fernandes 34'; Ignatyev 90+3'	Report	Nwakaeme 90+4'	Attendance: 21,669; Referee: Benoît Bastien (France)

28 November 2019	Trabzonspor (Turkey)	0–1	(Spain) Getafe	Şenol Güneş Stadium, Trabzon
16:50 (18:50 TRT)		Report	Mata 50'	Attendance: 11,465; Referee: Andris Treimanis (Latvia)

12 December 2019	Basel (Switzerland)	2–0	(Turkey) Trabzonspor	St. Jakob-Park, Basel
18:55	Widmer 21'; Stocker 72'	Report		Attendance: 17,921; Referee: Aleksandar Stavrev (North Macedonia)

== Statistics ==
=== Goalscorers ===
Rank	No.	Pos	Player	Süper Lig	Turkish Cup	Europa League	Total
1	11	FW	(Norway) Alexander Sørloth	23	6	2	31
2	9	FW	(Nigeria) Anthony Nwakaeme	11	2	1	14
3	8	MF	(Argentina) José Sosa	9	1	1	11
4	18	FW	(Ghana) Caleb Ekuban	5	1	4	10
5	77	DF	(Czech Republic) Filip Novák	6	2	1	9
6	~~12~~	FW	(England) Daniel Sturridge	4	3	0	7
7	10	MF	(Turkey) Abdülkadir Ömür	3	0	0	3
7	20	MF	(Turkey) Yusuf Sari	3	0	0	3
7	61	MF	(Turkey) Abdülkadir Parmak	1	1	1	3
10	6	MF	(Brazil) Guilherme	0	2	0	2
11	27	DF	(Morocco) Manuel da Costa	1	0	0	1
11	5	DF	(Iran) Majid Hosseini	1	0	0	1
11	15	MF	(Senegal) Badou Ndiaye	1	0	0	1
11	47	DF	(Portugal) João Pereira	1	0	0	1
11	~~7~~	FW	(Kosovo) Donis Avdijaj	1	0	0	1
11	44	MF	(Turkey) Safa Kinali	0	1	0	1
11	~~14~~	DF	(Portugal) Ivanildo Fernandes	0	1	0	1
Own goals				4	2	0	6
Total				74	22	10	106

Last updated: 19 July 2020.
Source: Competitions

=== Clean sheets ===
Rank	No.	Pos	Player	Süper Lig	Turkish Cup	Europa League	Total
1	1	GK	(Turkey) Uğurcan Çakır	4	0	0	4
2	16	GK	(Turkey) Erce Kardeşler	1	2	0	3
Total				5	2	0	7

Last updated: 22 June 2020.
Source: Competitions
