= 2018–19 Trabzonspor season =

Trabzonspor
2018–19 season
- Chairman: Ahmet Ali Ağaoğlu
- Manager: Ünal Karaman
- Stadium: Şenol Güneş Sports Complex
- Süper Lig: 4th
- Turkish Cup: Quarter-finals
- Top goalscorer: League: Hugo Rodallega (15); All: Hugo Rodallega (16)
Home colours	Away colours	Third colours

The 2018–19 season was Trabzonspor's 51st year in existence. In addition to the domestic league, the club participated in the Turkish Cup.

== Süper Lig ==
=== League table ===
Pos	Team	Pld	W	D	L	GF	GA	GD	Pts	Qualification or relegation
2	Başakşehir	34	19	10	5	49	22	+27	67	Qualification for the Champions League third qualifying round
3	Beşiktaş	34	19	8	7	72	46	+26	65	Qualification for the Europa League group stage
4	Trabzonspor	34	18	9	7	64	46	+18	63	Qualification for the Europa League third qualifying round
5	Yeni Malatyaspor	34	13	8	13	47	46	+1	47	Qualification for the Europa League second qualifying round
6	Fenerbahçe	34	11	13	10	44	44	0	46	

Source: Süper Lig, Soccerway
Rules for classification: 1) Points; 2) Head-to-head points; 3) Head-to-head goal difference; 4) Head-to-head goals scored; 5) Goal difference; 6) Goals scored; 7) Play-off.

Galibiyet Beraberlik Mağlubiyet

=== Results summary ===
Overall								Home						Away					
Pld	W	D	L	GF	GA	GD	Pts	W	D	L	GF	GA	GD	W	D	L	GF	GA	GD
34	18	9	7	64	46	+18	63	12	2	3	39	20	+19	6	7	4	25	26	−1

Source: TFF

=== Results by round ===
Round	1	2	3	4	5	6	7	8	9	10	11	12	13	14	15	16	17	18	19	20	21	22	23	24	25	26	27	28	29	30	31	32	33	34
Ground	A	H	A	H	A	H	H	A	H	A	H	A	H	A	H	A	H	H	A	H	A	H	A	A	H	A	H	A	H	A	H	A	H	A
RHsult	L	W	D	W	L	L	W	W	D	D	D	L	W	W	W	D	W	L	D	W	L	L	W	D	W	W	W	W	W	D	W	D	W	W
Position	18	9	9	6	7	12	10	5	7	7	9	10	7	7	6	4	2	5	5	5	5	6	4	4	4	4	4	4	4	4	4	4	4	4

Updated to match(es) played on 12 May 2019. Source: TFF.org
A = Away; H = Home; W = Win; D = Draw; L = Loss

== Matches ==
August 12, 2018 1	Medipol Başakşehir	2 - 0	Trabzonspor	Istanbul
19:30	Manuel da Costa 43'; Gökhan Inler (yellow card) 58'; Júnior Caiçara (yellow card) 74'; Emmanuel Adebayor 90'	Report	(yellow card) 57' Yusuf Yazıcı; (yellow card) 79' Ogenyi Onazi	Stadium: Başakşehir Fatih Terim Stadium; Referee: Fırat Aydınus; Assistant referees: Aleks Taşçıoğlu, Serkan Ok

August 17, 2018 2	Trabzonspor	3 - 1	Sivasspor	Trabzon
21:45	Olcay Şahan 7' (yellow card) 8'; Hugo Rodallega 14' (pen.) 27'	Report	(yellow card) 4' Delvin N'Dinga; (yellow card) 13' David Braz; 45' Douglas; (yellow card) 85' Uğur Çiftçi; (yellow card) 90' Erdoğan Yeşilyurt	Stadium: Şenol Güneş Stadium; Referee: Yaşar Kemal Uğurlu; Assistant referees: Erdinç Sezertam, Serkan Çimen

August 25, 2018 3	MKE Ankaragücü	2 - 2	Trabzonspor	Ankara
19:15	Bakary Koné (yellow card) 27'; Ricardo Faty 43'; Thibault Moulin (yellow card) 87'; Youness Mokhtar 90'	Report	28' Filip Novák; (yellow card) 41' Abdülkadir Ömür; 80' Hugo Rodallega; (yellow card) 90' Juraj Kucka	Stadium: Osmanlı Stadium; Referee: Mete Kalkavan; Assistant referees: Ceyhun Sesigüzel, Esat Sancaktar

September 1, 2018 4	Trabzonspor	4 - 0	Galatasaray	Trabzon
	Ogenyi Onazi 3'; Anthony Nwakaeme 25' 45+3'; (yellow card) 33' Filip Novák; Yusuf Yazıcı (yellow card) 87'; Caleb Ekuban 90+3'	Report	(red card) 30' Younès Belhanda; (yellow card) 42' Mariano	Stadium: Şenol Güneş Stadium; Referee: Fırat Aydınus; Assistant referees: Aleks Taşcıoğlu, Serkan Ok; Fourth official: Alper Ulusoy

September 17, 2018 5	Alanyaspor	1 - 0	Trabzonspor	Alanya, Antalya
	Merih Demiral 27'; Fabrice N'Sakala (yellow card) 65'	Report	(yellow card) 68' Yusuf Yazıcı; (yellow card) 89' Onur Kıvrak	Stadium: Alanya Oba Stadyumu; Referee: Halis Özkahya; Assistant referees: Ceyhun Sesigüzel, Hakan Yemişken; Fourth official: Özgür Yankaya

September 22, 2018 6	Trabzonspor	1 - 2	Göztepe	Trabzon
	Burak Yılmaz 66'; Vahid Amiri (yellow card) 38'; Yusuf Yazıcı (yellow card) 73'	Report	8' 28' Yasin Öztekin; (yellow card) 34' Adama Traoré); (yellow card) 61' Celso Borges; (yellow card) 88' Titi	Stadium: Şenol Güneş Stadium; Referee: Hüseyin Ocak; Assistant referees: Alpaslan Dedeş, Erdem Bayık; Fourth official: Barış Şimşek

September 29, 2018 7	Trabzonspor	4 - 2	Kasımpaşa	Trabzon
	Burak Yılmaz 43' 74'; Hugo Rodallega 53' 72'; Juraj Kucka (yellow card) 80'; Ogenyi Onazi (yellow card) 90+4'	Report	30' (yellow card) 70' Emem Eduok; (yellow card) 30' Loret Sadiku; 37' Trézéguet; (yellow card) 76' Josué Sá	Stadium: Şenol Güneş Stadium; Referee: Ali Palabıyık; Assistant referees: İbrahim Çağlar Uyarcan, Serkan Olguncan; Fourth official: Suat Arslanboğa

October 7, 2018 8	Akhisar Belediyespor	1 - 3	Trabzonspor	Akhisar, Manisa Province
	Yevhen Seleznyov 77'; Dany Nounkeu (yellow card) 66'	Report	35' José Sosa; (yellow card) 39' Zargo Touré; 43' (yellow card) 76' Burak Yılmaz; 67' Filip Novák; (yellow card) 79' João Pereira	Stadium: Spor Toto Akhisar Stadium; Referee: Halil Umut Meler; Assistant referees: Esat Sancaktar, Kerem Ersoy; Fourth official: Ali Şansalan

October 22, 2018 9	Trabzonspor	0 - 0	BB Erzurumspor	Trabzon
	Ogenyi Onazi (yellow card) 45+2'	Report	(yellow card) 24' Gilles Sunu; (yellow card) 65' Auremir; (yellow card) 90+3' Ibrahim Šehić	Stadium: Şenol Güneş Stadium; Referee: Bülent Yıldırım (referee); Assistant referees: Ayhan Öz, Yusuf Bozdoğan; Fourth official: Ali Şansalan

October 27, 2018 10	Antalyaspor	1 - 1	Trabzonspor	Antalya
	Souleymane Doukara 15'; Aly Cissokho (yellow card) 27'; Chico (yellow card) 61'	Report	28' (pen.) (yellow card) 90+5' Burak Yılmaz	Stadium: New Antalya Stadium; Referee: Yaşar Kemal Uğurlu; Assistant referees: Erdinç Sezertam, Samet Çiçek; Fourth official: Özgür Yankaya

November 4, 2018 11	Trabzonspor	1 - 1	Bursaspor	Trabzon
	Hugo Rodallega 25'; José Sosa (yellow card) 43'; Burak Yılmaz (yellow card) 45'	Report	(yellow card) 48' Ertuğrul Ersoy; 87' Allano; (yellow card) 90+6' Barış Yardımcı	Stadium: Şenol Güneş Stadium; Referee: Alper Ulusoy; Assistant referees: Mehmet Cem Satman, Volkan Ahmet Narinç; Fourth official: Suat Arslanboğa

November 9, 2018 12	Yeni Malatyaspor	5 - 0	Trabzonspor	Malatya
	Guilherme 36' 64'; Danijel Aleksić 38' 48'; Khalid Boutaïb (yellow card) 44' (goal) 51'	Report	(yellow card) 66' Hugo Rodallega	Stadium: Malatya Arena; Referee: Arda Kardeşler; Assistant referees: Ali Saygın Ögel, Hakan Yemişken; Fourth official: Barış Şimşek

November 25, 2018 13	Trabzonspor	2 - 1	Fenerbahçe	Trabzon
	Filip Novák 50'; José Sosa 75'; Ogenyi Onazi (yellow card) 87'; João Pereira (yellow card) 90'; Uğurcan Çakır (yellow card) 90+4'	Report	(yellow card) 25' Islam Slimani; 82' (yellow card) 87' Michael Frey; (yellow card) 90+5' Yiğithan Güveli	Stadium: Şenol Güneş Stadium; Referee: Halil Umut Meler; Assistant referees: Cevdet Kömürcüoğlu, İbrahim Çağlar Uyarcan; Fourth official: Koray Gençerler

December 1, 2018 14	Kayserispor	0 - 2	Trabzonspor	Kayseri
	Cristian Săpunaru (yellow card) 21'; Mert Özyıldırım (yellow card) 65'; Bernard Mensah (yellow card) 81'; Şamil Çinaz (yellow card) 82'; Tiago Lopes (yellow card) 84'	Report	(yellow card) 70' João Pereira; 82' Caleb Ekuban; 90+8' Vahid Amiri	Stadium: Kadir Has Stadium; Referee: Mustafa Öğretmenoğlu; Assistant referees: İsmail Şencan, Murat Ergin Gözütok; Fourth official: Kutluhan Bilgiç

December 8, 2018 15	Trabzonspor	3 - 0	Konyaspor	Trabzon
	Yusuf Yazıcı (yellow card) 67'; Hugo Rodallega (pen.), 76' (yellow card) 80'; Caleb Ekuban 77'; Ogenyi Onazi 89'	Report	(yellow card) 22' Uğur Demirok; (yellow card) 51' Milan Jevtović; (yellow card) 63' Ömer Ali Şahiner	Stadium: Şenol Güneş Stadium; Referee: Mete Kalkavan; Assistant referees: Ceyhun Sesigüzel, Esat Sancaktar; Fourth official: Tugay Kaan Numanoğlu

December 16, 2018 16	Beşiktaş	2 - 2	Trabzonspor	Istanbul
	Dorukhan Toköz (yellow card) 45'; Caner Erkin (yellow card) 46'; Ogenyi Onazi (k.k.), 57'; Adem Ljajić (yellow card) 77'; Mustafa Pektemek 90+6'	Report	45+1' Hugo Rodallega; 47' Anthony Nwakaeme; (yellow card) 90+2' João Pereira	Stadium: Vodafone Arena; Referee: Halil Umut Meler; Assistant referees: İbrahim Çağlar Uyarcanü Mustafa Emre Eyisoy; Fourth official: Özgür Yankaya

December 23, 2018 17	Trabzonspor	4 - 1	Rizespor	Trabzon
	Abdülkadir Ömür 24' 67'; Hugo Rodallega 79'; Caleb Ekuban (yellow card) 89'; Juraj Kucka (yellow card) 90'; Anthony Nwakaeme 90+3'; Abdülkadir Parmak (yellow card) 90+6'; Kamil Çörekçi (yellow card) 90+7'	Report	(yellow card) 74' Mustafa Saymak; 84' Aminu Umar; (yellow card) 90+6' Rick Boldrin	Stadium: Şenol Güneş Stadium; Referee: Fırat Aydınus; Assistant referees: Aleks Taşçıoğlu, Serkan Ok; Fourth official: Suat Arslanboğa

January 20, 2019 18	Trabzonspor	2 - 4	İstanbul Başakşehir F.K.	Trabzon
	João Pereira (yellow card) 20'; Caleb Ekuban (yellow card) 28' (goal) 49'; Yusuf Yazıcı (yellow card) 47' (goal) 80'	Report	32' (yellow card) 64' İrfan Kahveci; 42' Gaël Clichy; 42' (o.g.) Caleb Ekuban; (yellow card) 70' Arda Turan; 86' Edin Višća	Stadium: Şenol Güneş Stadium; Referee: Halil Umut Meler; Assistant referees: Mehmet Cem Hanoğlu, Mustafa Emre Eyisoy; Fourth official: Serkan Tokat

January 27, 2019 19	Sivasspor	1 - 1	Trabzonspor	Sivas
	Arouna Koné 73'	Report	(yellow card) 74' Hugo Rodallega; 75' Abdülkadir Parmak	Stadium: sivas 4 Eylül Stadium; Referee: Alper Ulusoy; Assistant referees: Hakan Yemişken, Volkan Ahmet Narinç; Fourth official: Özgür Yankaya

February 2, 2019 20	Trabzonspor	1 - 0	MKE Ankaragücü	Trabzon
	Hugo Rodallega 6'; Hüseyin Türkmen (yellow card) 28'; Caleb Ekuban (yellow card) 69'; Anthony Nwakaeme (yellow card) 85'; Uğurcan Çakır (yellow card) 90+5'	Report	(yellow card) 48' Wilfred Moke; (yellow card) 66' Sedat Ağçay; (yellow card) 90+1' Tiago Pinto	Stadium: Şenol Güneş Stadium; Referee: Mustafa Öğretmenoğlu; Assistant referees: Murat Ergin Gözütok, Samet Çiçek; Fourth official: Bahattin Şimşek

February 10, 2019 21	Galatasaray	3 - 1	Trabzonspor	Istanbul
	Mbaye Diagne (yellow card) 8' (goal) 21' (pen.); Younès Belhanda 44' 51' (yellow card) 75'; Ryan Donk (yellow card) 62'; Martin Linnes (yellow card) 80'	Report	(yellow card) 18' Arda Akbulut; 30' Hugo Rodallega	Stadium: Türk Telekom Stadium; Referee: Ümit Öztürk; Assistant referees: Kerem Ersoy, Osman Gökhan Bilir; Fourth official: Arda Kardeşler

February 17, 2019 22	Trabzonspor	0 - 2	Alanyaspor	Trabzon
	Vahid Amiri (yellow card) 60'	Report	(yellow card) 14' Welinton; (yellow card) 36' Ceyhun Gülselam; 51' 68' Édouard Cissé	Stadium: Şenol Güneş Stadium; Referee: Suat Arslanboğa; Assistant referees: Alpaslan Dedeş, Mustafa Sönmez; Fourth official: Abdulkadir Bitigen

February 22, 2019 23	Göztepe	1 - 3	Trabzonspor	Bornova, İzmir
	Berkan Emir (yellow card) 22'; Deniz Kadah 71' (pen.); Yasin Öztekin (yellow card) 89'	Report	27' Hugo Rodallega; (yellow card) 63' Majid Hosseini; 73' Abdülkadir Parmak; 90' (o.g.) Kadu	Stadium: Bornova Aziz Kocaoğlu Stadyumu; Referee: Mustafa Öğretmenoğlu; Assistant referees: Hakan Yemişken, Süleyman Özay; Fourth official: Kadir Sağlam

March 4, 2019 24	Kasımpaşa	2 - 2	Trabzonspor	Istanbul
	Veysel Sarı (yellow card) 30'; Loret Sadiku (yellow card) 53'; Stipe Perica 63'; Josué Sá (yellow card) 79'; Trézéguet 90' (pen.)	Report	30' 45+2' Anthony Nwakaeme; (yellow card) 81' Yusuf Yazıcı; (yellow card) 86' Filip Novák	Stadium: Recep Tayyip Erdoğan Stadium; Referee: Bülent Yıldırım (referee); Assistant referees: Asım Yusuf Öz, Mustafa Emre Eyisoy; Fourth official: Özgür Yankaya

March 9, 2019 25	Trabzonspor	2 - 1	Akhisar Belediyespor	Trabzon
	Majid Hosseini (yellow card) 29'; Yusuf Yazıcı (yellow card) 34'; Abdülkadir Parmak (yellow card) 62'; Kamil Çörekçi (yellow card) 66'; Olcay Şahan (yellow card) 67'; Anthony Nwakaeme 70'; José Sosa 76' (pen.)	Report	(yellow card) 62' Serginho; 65' (yellow card) 71' Jeremy Bokila; (yellow card) 69' Zeki Yavru	Stadium: Şenol Güneş Stadium; Referee: Yaşar Kemal Uğurlu; Assistant referees: Ali Saygın Ögel, Candaş Elbil; Fourth official: Tugay Kaan Numanoğlu

March 16, 2019 26	BB Erzurumspor	0 - 1	Trabzonspor	Erzurum
	Lokman Gör (yellow card) 87'; İbrahim Akdağ (yellow card) 90+4'	Report	(yellow card) 47' Vahid Amiri; 64' Anthony Nwakaeme; (yellow card) 74' Abdülkadir Parmak; (yellow card) 86' Hugo Rodallega	Stadium: Kazım Karabekir Stadium; Referee: Ali Palabıyık; Assistant referees: Serkan Olguncan, Volkan Ahmet Narinç; Fourth official: Caner Ak

April 5, 2019 27	Trabzonspor	4 - 1	Antalyaspor	Trabzon
	Anthony Nwakaeme 21'; Caleb Ekuban 58'; Kamil Çörekçi (yellow card) 55'; Olcay Şahan 67'; Murat Cem Akpınar 90+4'	Report	9' Souleymane Doukara; (yellow card) 56' Charles Fernando Basílio da Silva	Stadium: Şenol Güneş Stadium; Referee: Hüseyin Göçek; Assistant referees: Ceyhun Sesigüzel, Kerem Ersoy; Fourth official: Emre Malok

April 12, 2019 28	Bursaspor	0 - 1	Trabzonspor	Bursa
20:30	Aytaç Kara (yellow card) 38'; Stéphane Badji (yellow card) 80'; Ertuğrul Ersoy (yellow card) 90'	Report	(yellow card) 38' José Sosa; 68' Abdülkadir Ömür; (yellow card) 83' Luis Ibáñez; (yellow card) 90' Majid Hosseini	Stadium: Timsah Arena; Referee: Bülent Yıldırım (referee); Assistant referees: Asım Yusuf Öz, Serkan Ok; Fourth official: Özgüç Türkalp

April 20, 2019 29	Trabzonspor	2 - 1	Yeni Malatyaspor	Trabzon
	Anthony Nwakaeme 31'; Filip Novák (yellow card) 61'; Hugo Rodallega 79'; João Pereira (yellow card) 90+4'	Report	22' (yellow card) 45' Ömer Şişmanoğlu; (yellow card) 70' (yellow card) 76' (red card) Mustafa Akbaş	Stadium: Şenol Güneş Stadium; Referee: Zorbay Küçük; Assistant referees: İbrahim Çağlar Uyarcan, Kemal Yılmaz; Fourth official: Hakan Ceylan

April 27, 2019 30	Fenerbahçe	1 - 1	Trabzonspor	Istanbul
	Martin Škrtel (yellow card) 21'; Roberto Soldado (yellow card) 30'; Hasan Ali Kaldırım (yellow card) 57'; Sadık Çiftpınar (yellow card) 59' (yellow card) 71' (red card); Mathieu Valbuena 90+6'	Report	16' Yusuf Yazıcı; (yellow card) 74' Hüseyin Türkmen; (yellow card) 85' Abdülkadir Parmak	Stadium: Ülker Stadyumu; Referee: Cüneyt Çakır; Assistant referees: Bahattin Duran, Tarık Ongun; Fourth official: Abdulkadir Bitigen

May 6, 2019 31	Trabzonspor	4 - 2	Kayserispor	Trabzon
	José Sosa 16'; Yusuf Yazıcı 20' (yellow card) 51'; Majid Hosseini (yellow card) 52'; Abdülkadir Ömür 65'; Filip Novák 84'	Report	32' 64' Hasan Hüseyin Acar; (yellow card) 45+3' Artem Kravets; (yellow card) 69' Deniz Türüç; (yellow card) 69' Tjaronn Chery	Stadium: Şenol Güneş Stadium; Referee: Fırat Aydınus; Assistant referees: Ali Saygın Ögel, Mustafa Sönmez; Fourth official: Mustafa Aydın

May 12, 2019 32	Konyaspor	2 - 2	Trabzonspor	Konya
	Jens Jønsson 17' (yellow card) 88'; Moryké Fofana 45'; Uğur Demirok (yellow card) 78'; Ömer Ali Şahiner (yellow card) 82'; Deni Milošević (yellow card) 90+4'	Report	11' Hugo Rodallega; 79' (pen.) José Sosa; (yellow card) 90+7' Yusuf Yazıcı	Stadium: Konya Büyükşehir Stadium; Referee: Halis Özkahya; Assistant referees: Ceyhun Sesigüzel, Hakan Yemişken; Fourth official: Atilla Karaoğlan

May 18, 2019 33	Trabzonspor	2 - 1	Beşiktaş	Trabzon
	Filip Novák 53'; Vahid Amiri (yellow card) 90+1'; Yusuf Yazıcı 77' (yellow card) 90+4'	Report	(yellow card) 15' Caner Erkin; (yellow card) 72' Nicolas Isimat-Mirin; 74' Shinji Kagawa	Stadium: Şenol Güneş Stadium; Referee: Fırat Aydınus; Assistant referees: Aleks Taşçıoğlu, Süleyman Özay; Fourth official: Özgür Yankaya

May 24, 2019 34	Çaykur Rizespor	2 - 3	Trabzonspor	Rize
	Rick Boldrin 16' (yellow card) 90+4'; Vedat Muriqi 65'	Report	20' Hugo Rodallega; 23' (o.g.) Dario Melnjak; 43' Abdülkadir Ömür; (yellow card) 89' Filip Novák	Stadium: Yeni Rize Şehir Stadium; Referee: Yaşar Kemal Uğurlu; Assistant referees: Kemal Yılmaz, Serkan Olguncan; Fourth official: Kadir Sağlam

=== Türkiye Kupası ===
==== Fifth round ====
December 4, 2018	Sivas Belediyespor	2 - 2	Trabzonspor	Sivas
	Aykut Emre Yakut (yellow card) 6' (goal) 67'; Alpay Koçaklı 9'; Mustafa Aydın (yellow card) 13'; Aykut Emre Yakut 67'; Fatih Ayık (yellow card) 83'	Report	45+1' Majid Hosseini; 46' Abdülkadir Parmak	Stadium: Muhsin Yazıcıoğlu Stadyumu; Referee: Serkan Çınar; Assistant referees: Candaş Elbil, Kemal Elmas; Fourth official: Emre Malok

December 19, 2018	Trabzonspor	5 - 0	Sivas Belediyespor	Trabzon
	Batuhan Artarslan 9'; Caleb Ekuban 17' 35'; Zeki Yavru (yellow card) 19'; Vahid Amiri 52'; Abdülkadir Parmak 78'	Report	(yellow card) 66' Fatih Çiplak	Stadium: Şenol Güneş Stadium; Referee: Bahattin Şimşek; Assistant referees: Deniz Caner Özaral, Kerem Ersoy; Fourth official: Kutluhan Bilgiç

==== Round of 16 ====
January 16, 2019	Trabzonspor	2 - 1	Balıkesirspor	Trabzon
	Caleb Ekuban 45+1'; Hugo Rodallega 63'; Kamil Çörekçi (yellow card) 76'	Report	48' Nizamettin Çalışkan	Stadium: Şenol Güneş Stadium; Referee: Özgür Yankaya; Assistant referees: Candaş Elbil, Erdinç Sezertam; Fourth official: Bahattin Şimşek

January 23, 2019	Balıkesirspor	1 - 3	Trabzonspor	Balıkesir
	Doğa İşeri (yellow card) 19'; Steve Leo Beleck 34'; Muhammed Ali Doğan (yellow card) 63'	Report	32' Filip Novák; 59' 87' Abdülkadir Parmak	Stadium: Balıkesir Atatürk Stadium; Referee: Hüseyin Göçek; Assistant referees: Alpaslan Dedeş, Erdem Bayık; Fourth official: Hakan Ceylan

==== Quarter finals ====
February 5, 2019	Trabzonspor	0 - 0	Ümraniyespor	Trabzon
	Luis Ibáñez (yellow card) 71'	Report	(yellow card) 50' Uğur Aygören	Stadium: Şenol Güneş Stadium; Referee: Yaşar Kemal Uğurlu; Assistant referees: Ali Saygın Ögel, Serkan Çimen; Fourth official: Alper Çetin

February 26, 2019	Ümraniyespor	3 - 1	Trabzonspor	Istanbul
	Emircan Altıntaş (yellow card) 37' (goal) 66' (pen.); Leandrinho 55'; Muhammed Gönülaçar (yellow card) 68'; Burak Öğür (yellow card) 84'; Alaaddin Okumuş (yellow card) 90+3'; Atabey Çiçek 90+7'	Report	35' Anthony Nwakaeme; (yellow card) 87' Caleb Ekuban; (yellow card) 90+8' Murat Cem Akpınar	Stadium: Başakşehir Fatih Terim Stadium; Referee: Alper Ulusoy; Assistant referees: İbrahim Bozbey, Samet Çiçek; Fourth official: Kutluhan Bilgiç

== Statistics ==
=== Squad statistics ===
No.	Pos.	Player	Süper Lig				Türkiye Kupası				Total			
No.	Pos.	Player	Apps	Goal	Yellow card	Red card	Apps	Goal	Yellow card	Red card	Apps	Goal	Yellow card	Red card
28	FV	(Colombia) Hugo Rodallega	31	15	4	0	4	1	0	0	35	16	4	0
	FV	(Ghana) Caleb Ekuban	28	5	3	0	6	3	1	0	34	8	4	0
97	OS	(Turkey) Yusuf Yazıcı	29	3	10	0	4	0	0	0	33	3	10	0
		(Czech Republic) Filip Novák	28	4	4	0	3	1	0	0	31	5	4	0
19	OS	(Turkey) Abdülkadir Ömür	28	5	1	0	2	0	0	0	30	5	1	0
	OS	(Senegal) Zargo Touré	27	0	1	0	3	0	0	0	30	0	1	0
	FV	(Nigeria) Anthony Nwakaeme	25	10	1	0	4	1	0	0	29	11	1	0
28	FV	(Argentina) José Sosa	28	5	2	0	1	0	0	0	28	5	2	0
	DF	(Iran) Majid Hosseini	24	0	4	0	4	1	0	0	28	1	4	0
		(Turkey) Hüseyin Türkmen	22	0	2	0	5	0	0	0	27	0	2	0
	FV	(Iran) Vahid Amiri	21	1	3	0	3	1	0	0	24	2	3	0
		(Turkey) Abdülkadir Parmak	17	2	4	0	6	4	0	0	23	6	4	0
96	KL	(Turkey) Uğurcan Çakır	19	0	2	0	4	0	0	0	23	0	2	0
47	DF	(Portugal) João Pereira	21	0	6	0	1	0	0	0	22	0	6	0
10	OS	(Turkey) Olcay Şahan	19	2	2	0	1	0	0	0	20	2	2	0
2	DF	(Turkey) Kamil Çörekçi	11	0	3	0	6	0	1	0	17	0	4	0
20	OS	(Nigeria) Ogenyi Onazi	16	2	4	0	0	0	0	0	16	2	4	0
16	OS	(Turkey) Batuhan Artarslan	9	0	0	0	6	1	0	0	15	1	0	0
1	KL	(Turkey) Onur Kıvrak	12	0	1	0	0	0	0	0	12	0	1	0
		(Argentina) Luis Ibáñez	5	0	1	0	5	0	1	0	10	0	2	0
33	OS	(Slovakia) Juraj Kucka	8	0	3	0	1	0	0	0	9	0	3	0
		(Turkey) Murat Cem Akpınar	6	1	0	0	3	0	1	0	9	1	1	0
17	FV	(Turkey) Burak Yılmaz	7	5	3	0	0	0	0	0	7	5	3	0
		(Turkey) Arda Akbulut	2	0	1	0	2	0	0	0	4	0	1	0
		(Turkey) Berkay Sefa Kara	1	0	0	0	2	0	0	0	3	0	0	0
25	DF	(Turkey) Mustafa Akbaş	3	0	0	0	0	0	0	0	3	0	0	0
		(Turkey) Zeki Yavru	1	0	0	0	2	0	1	0	3	0	1	0
		(Turkey) Ali Karnapoğlu	1	0	0	0	1	0	0	0	2	0	0	0
		(Turkey) Semih Karadeniz	0	0	0	0	2	0	0	0	2	0	0	0
23	KL	(Costa Rica) Esteban Alvarado	0	0	0	0	1	0	0	0	1	0	0	0
