= 2023–24 Trabzonspor season =

Trabzonspor
2023–24 season
- President: Ertuğrul Doğan
- Head coach: Nenad Bjelica (until 11 October); Abdullah Avcı (from 12 October)
- Stadium: Papara Park
- Süper Lig: 3rd
- Turkish Cup: Runners-up
- Top goalscorer: League: Paul Onuachu (15); All: Paul Onuachu (17)
- Average home league attendance: 15,386
Home colours	Away colours	Third colours

The 2023–24 season was Trabzonspor's 57th season in existence and 50th consecutive in the Süper Lig. They also competed in the Turkish Cup.

== Players ==
=== First-team squad ===
As of 7 February 2024

Note: Flags indicate national team as defined under FIFA eligibility rules; some limited exceptions apply. Players may hold more than one non-FIFA nationality.

No.	Pos.	Nation	Player
1	GK	TUR	Uğurcan Çakır (captain)
2	DF	TUR	Rayyan Baniya
3	DF	ESP	Joaquín Fernández
4	DF	TUR	Hüseyin Türkmen
5	MF	TUR	Berat Özdemir (on loan from Ettifaq)
6	MF	FRA	Batista Mendy
7	MF	BIH	Edin Višća
8	MF	MKD	Enis Bardhi
9	FW	TUR	Umut Bozok
12	DF	BEL	Thomas Meunier
14	FW	GRE	Taxiarchis Fountas
16	MF	TUR	Kerem Şen
18	DF	TUR	Eren Elmalı
20	MF	MNE	Ognjen Bakić

No.	Pos.	Nation	Player
23	MF	TUR	Umut Güneş
24	DF	SUR	Stefano Denswil
25	GK	TUR	Onuralp Çevikkan
27	FW	EGY	Mahmoud Trézéguet
29	FW	CIV	Nicolas Pépé
30	FW	NGR	Paul Onuachu (on loan from Southampton)
32	DF	CRO	Filip Benković (on loan from Udinese)
33	MF	TUR	Göktan Gürpüz
50	MF	TUR	Mehmet-Can Aydın (on loan from Schalke 04)
54	GK	TUR	Muhammet Taha Tepe
73	DF	TUR	Arif Boşluk
94	FW	TUR	Enis Destan
98	GK	TUR	Kağan Moradaoğlu
99	FW	CRO	Mislav Oršić

=== Out on loan ===
Note: Flags indicate national team as defined under FIFA eligibility rules; some limited exceptions apply. Players may hold more than one non-FIFA nationality.

No.	Pos.	Nation	Player
—	GK	TUR	Arda Akbulut (at 1461 Trabzon FK until 30 June 2024)
—	GK	TUR	Hakan Aydın (at Sebat Gençlikspor until 30 June 2024)
—	DF	TUR	Serkan Asan (at Pendikspor until 30 June 2024)
—	DF	TUR	Yunus Emre Köse (at 52 Orduspor until 30 June 2024)
—	DF	TUR	Caner Uzun (at Sebat Gençlikspor until 30 June 2024)
—	MF	AZE	Murat Akpınar (at Sakaryaspor until 30 June 2024)
—	MF	TUR	Kadir Bakırtaş (at Çankaya until 30 June 2024)
—	MF	TUR	Kerem Baykuş (at 1461 Trabzon FK until 30 June 2024)
—	MF	TUR	Süleyman Cebeci (at 68 Aksaray Belediyespor until 30 June 2024)
—	MF	TUR	Ali Alperen Çelik (at Sebat Gençlikspor until 30 June 2024)
—	MF	GRE	Dimitrios Kourbelis (at Karagümrük until 30 June 2024)

No.	Pos.	Nation	Player
—	MF	TUR	Gökdeniz Kazaz (at Sebat Gençlikspor until 30 June 2024)
—	MF	TUR	Muhammed Pınarcı (at Sebat Gençlikspor until 30 June 2024)
—	MF	TUR	Veysel Sönmezsoy (at Sebat Gençlikspor until 30 June 2024)
—	MF	TUR	Hakan Yeşil (at 1461 Trabzon FK until 30 June 2024)
—	MF	TUR	Emirhan Zaman (at 1461 Trabzon FK until 30 June 2024)
—	FW	URU	Maxi Gómez (at Cádiz until 30 June 2024)
—	FW	TUR	Batuhan Kör (at 1461 Trabzon FK until 30 June 2024)
—	FW	MAR	Montasser Lahtimi (at Wydad AC until 30 June 2024)
—	FW	TUR	Emir Uzun (at Sebat Gençlikspor until 30 June 2024)
—	MF	CRO	Tonio Teklić (at Karagümrük until 30 June 2024)

== Kits ==
- Supplier: Joma
- Sponsors: Vestel (front) / QNB Finansbank (left sleeve) / Safiport (right sleeve) / WhiteBIT (back) / Rentgo (short front) / Papara (short back)/ Miller Holding (sock)

Home	Away	Third	Fourth

== Transfers ==
=== In ===
Pos.	Player	Transferred from	Fee	Date	Source
MF	(Greece) Dimitrios Kourbelis	(Greece) Panathinaikos	Free	1 July 2023	
MF	(Croatia) Mislav Oršić	(Turkey) Göztepe	€2,400,000	1 July 2023	
DF	(Croatia) Filip Benković	(Italy) Udinese	Loan + €500,000	10 July 2023	
MF	(Montenegro) Ognjen Bakić	(Croatia) Osijek	Free	9 September 2023	
FW	(Nigeria) Paul Onuachu	(England) Southampton	Loan	11 September 2023	
MF	(Turkey) Umut Güneş	(Turkey) Alanyaspor	€2,300,000	15 September 2023	
MF	(Turkey) Behlül Aydın	(Turkey) 1461 Trabzon	Loan return	29 January 2024	
DF	(Belgium) Thomas Meunier	(Germany) Borussia Dortmund	Free	7 February 2024	
GK	(Turkey) Arda Akbulut	(Turkey) Adanaspor	Loan return	8 February 2024	

=== Out ===
Pos.	Player	Transferred to	Fee	Date	Source
MF	(Slovakia) Marek Hamšík	Retired		1 July 2023	
DF	(Turkey) Taha Altıkardeş	(Turkey) Göztepe	Free	4 July 2023	
MF	(Brazil) Flávio	(Saudi Arabia) Al-Taawoun	Loan + €182,000	9 July 2023	
DF	(Spain) Marc Bartra	Contract termination		11 July 2023	
FW	(Uruguay) Maxi Gómez	(Spain) Cádiz	Loan	22 August 2023	
DF	(Denmark) Jens Stryger	Released		18 January 2024	
MF	(Turkey) Behlül Aydın	(Turkey) GMG Kastamonu	Undisclosed	2 February 2024	
GK	(Turkey) Arda Akbulut	(Turkey) 1461 Trabzon	Loan return	9 February 2024	

== Pre-season and friendlies ==
Win Draw Loss Fixtures

8 July 2023 Friendly	Trabzonspor (Turkey)	0–2	(Croatia) Hajduk Split	Ljubljana, Slovenia
11:30			Dolček 14'; Melnjak 33'	Stadium: Športni Park Šiška

15 July 2023 Friendly	Fehérvár (Hungary)	2–2	(Turkey) Trabzonspor	Kranj, Slovenia
17:30	Csongvai 37'; Kodro 58'		Gómez 9'; Bardhi 75'	Stadium: Nacionalni Nogometni Center Brdo

15 July 2023 Friendly	Celje (Slovenia)	2–2	(Turkey) Trabzonspor	Ljubljana, Slovenia
12:30	Bajde 37'; Zec 64'		Şen 25'; Bozok 51'	Stadium: Športni Park Šiška

25 July 2023 Friendly	Trabzonspor (Turkey)	4–1	(North Macedonia) Rabotnički	Čatež ob Savi, Slovenia
17:30	Gómez 8'; Bakasetas 40'; Elmalı 63'; Destan 88', (yellow card) 89'		Çakır 17' (o.g.); Todorovski (yellow card) 52'	Stadium: Sportski Centar Terme Čatež

26 July 2023 Friendly	Trigla (Slovenia)	0–4	(Turkey) Trabzonspor	Kranj, Slovenia
11:00			Bozok 4', 51'; Teklić 62'; Yıldırım 79'	Stadium: Športni Center Stanko Mlakar

== Competitions ==
=== Overall record ===
Competition	First match	Last match	Starting round	Final position	Record							
Competition	First match	Last match	Starting round	Final position	Pld	W	D	L	GF	GA	GD	Win %
Süper Lig	11 August 2023	26 May 2024	Matchday 1	3rd	38	21	4	13	69	50	+19	55.26
Turkish Cup	6 December 2023	23 May 2024	Fourth round	Runners-up	7	6	0	1	18	8	+10	85.71
Total					45	27	4	14	87	58	+29	60.00

Source: Soccerway

=== Süper Lig ===
==== League table ====
Pos	Team	Pld	W	D	L	GF	GA	GD	Pts	Qualification or relegation
1	Galatasaray (C)	38	33	3	2	92	26	+66	102	Qualification for the Champions League play-off round
2	Fenerbahçe	38	31	6	1	99	31	+68	99	Qualification for the Champions League second qualifying round
3	Trabzonspor	38	21	4	13	69	50	+19	67	Qualification for the Europa League second qualifying round
4	Başakşehir	38	18	7	13	57	43	+14	61	Qualification for the Conference League second qualifying round
5	Kasımpaşa	38	16	8	14	62	65	−3	56 (Note: Kasımpaşa are ahead of Beşiktaş on head-to-head points: Kasımpaşa 2–1 Beşiktaş, Beşiktaş 1–3 Kasımpaşa.)	

Source: Süper Lig
Rules for classification: 1) Points; 2) Head-to-head points; 3) Head-to-head goal difference; 4) Head-to-head goals scored; 5) Goal difference; 6) Goals scored; 7) Play-off.
(C) Champions

==== Results summary ====
Overall								Home						Away					
Pld	W	D	L	GF	GA	GD	Pts	W	D	L	GF	GA	GD	W	D	L	GF	GA	GD
37	20	4	13	68	50	+18	64	12	1	6	38	25	+13	8	3	7	30	25	+5

Source: Trendyol Süper Lig

==== Results by round ====
Round	1	2	3	4	5	6	7	8	9	10	11	12	13	14	15	16	17	18	19	20	21	22	23	24	25	26	27	28	29	30	31	32	33	34	35	36	37	38
Ground	H	A	H	A	H	A	H	A	H	A	A	H	A	H	A	H	A	H	A	A	H	A	H	A	H	A	H	A	H	H	A	H	A	H	A	H	A	H
Result	W	L	L	W	W	L	W	L	W	D	W	W	D	L	W	W	W	D	W	D	L	L	L	L	W	W	W	L	W	L	W	L	W	W	L	W	W	W
Position	7	10	13	8	5	7	5	7	5	6	4	4	5	6	3	3	3	3	3	3	3	3	3	4	3	3	3	3	3	3	3	3	3	3	3	3	3	3

Source: Trendyol Süper Lig
A = Away; H = Home; W = Win; D = Draw; L = Loss

==== Matches ====
The league fixtures were unveiled on 18 July 2023.

11 August 2023 1	Trabzonspor	1–0	Antalyaspor	Trabzon
21:00 UTC+3	Denswil 8'	Report	Rakip (yellow card) 46'	Stadium: Papara Park; Attendance: 30,692; Referee: Zorbay Küçük

19 August 2023 2	Galatasaray	2–0	Trabzonspor	Istanbul
21:45 UTC+3	Icardi 23', 90+3', (yellow card) 62'; Oliveira (yellow card) 76'; Muslera (yellow card) 86'; Angeliño (yellow card) 86'	Report	Kourbelis (yellow card) 64'; Bardhi (yellow card) 68'; Elmalı (yellow card) 90+6'	Stadium: Ali Sami Yen Stadium; Attendance: 45,891; Referee: Atilla Karaoğlan

26 August 2023 3	Trabzonspor	2–3	Çaykur Rizespor	Trabzon
19:15	Bakasetas 58' (pen.); Destan 83'		Mocsi 20'; Keser 43', 66'	Stadium: Papara Park; Attendance: 23,044; Referee: Halil Umut Meler

1 September 2023 4	Kasımpaşa	1–5	Trabzonspor	Istanbul
21:00	Winck 85'		Destan 15'; Bardhi 28', 64'; Benković 45+4'; Gürpüz 82'	Stadium: Recep Tayyip Erdoğan Stadium; Referee: Erkan Özdamar

17 September 2023 5	Trabzonspor	3–0	Beşiktaş	Trabzon
20:00	Onuachu 29'; Bakasetas 41'; Višća 61'			Stadium: Papara Park; Referee: Volkan Bayarslan

25 September 2023 6	Hatayspor	3–2	Trabzonspor	Mersin
20:00				Stadium: Mersin Stadium; Referee: Burak Şeker

30 September 2023 7	Trabzonspor	2–1	Pendikspor	Trabzon
16:00				Stadium: Papara Park; Referee: Bahattin Şimşek

6 October 2023 8	Adana Demirspor	1–0	Trabzonspor	Adana
20:00 TRT (UTC+3)	Nani 29', (yellow card) 54'; Gravillon (yellow card) 41'; Belhanda (yellow card) 52'; Özbir (yellow card) 76'; Toköz (yellow card) 90+8'	Report	Stryger Larsen (yellow card) 76'; Baniya (yellow card) 90+6'; Eren Elmalı (yellow card) 90+6'	Stadium: New Adana Stadium; Referee: Kadir Sağlam

23 October 2023 9	Trabzonspor	1–0	Alanyaspor	Trabzon
20:00				Stadium: Papara Park; Referee: Arda Kardeşler

29 October 2023 10	Fatih Karagümrük	0–0	Trabzonspor	Istanbul
16:00				Stadium: Atatürk Olympic Stadium; Referee: Ali Şansalan

4 November 2023 11	Fenerbahçe	2–3	Trabzonspor	Istanbul
19:00				Stadium: Şükrü Saracoğlu Stadium; Referee: Zorbay Küçük

10 November 2023 12	Trabzonspor	2–1	Konyaspor	Trabzon
20:00				Stadium: Papara Park; Referee: Cihan Aydın

27 November 2023 13	Sivasspor	3–3	Trabzonspor	Sivas
20:00				Stadium: New Sivas 4 Eylül Stadium; Referee: Volkan Bayarslan

3 December 2023 14	Trabzonspor	0–1	Kayserispor	Trabzon
16:00				Stadium: Papara Park; Referee: Ümit Öztürk

10 December 2023 15	Gaziantep FK	1–3	Trabzonspor	Gaziantep
19:00				Stadium: Gaziantep Stadium; Referee: Arda Kardeşler

19 December 2023 17	İstanbulspor	0–3; Awarded	Trabzonspor	Istanbul
20:00				Stadium: Esenyurt Necmi Kadıoğlu Stadium

23 December 2023 18	Trabzonspor	1–1	Istanbul Basaksehir	Trabzon
19:00				Stadium: Papara Park; Referee: Volkan Bayarslan

6 January 2024 19	Ankaragücü	0–1	Trabzonspor	Ankara
19:00				Stadium: Eryaman Stadium; Referee: Burak Şeker

11 January 2024 16	Trabzonspor	2–1	Samsunspor	Trabzon
20:00				Stadium: Papara Park; Referee: Cihan Aydın

14 January 2024 20	Antalyaspor	1–1	Trabzonspor	Antalya
16:00				Stadium: Antalya Stadium; Referee: Bahattin Şimşek

21 January 2024 21	Trabzonspor	1–5	Galatasaray	Trabzon
				Stadium: Papara Park

25 January 2024 22	Çaykur Rizespor	1–0	Trabzonspor	Rize
				Stadium: Rize City Stadium

29 January 2024 23	Trabzonspor	2–3	Kasımpaşa	Trabzon
				Stadium: Papara Park

4 February 2024 24	Beşiktaş	2–0	Trabzonspor	Istanbul
19:00 TRT (UTC+3)	Meraş (yellow card) 38'; Kılıçsoy 44', 62'; Svensson (yellow card) 54'; Ghezzal (yellow card) 58'			Stadium: Tüpraş Stadyumu; Referee: Arda Kardeşler

12 February 2024 25	Trabzonspor	2–0	Hatayspor	Trabzon
17:00 TRT (UTC+3)	Trézéguet 49'; Bardhi 77'			Stadium: Papara Park; Referee: Ali Şansalan

18 February 2024 26	Pendikspor	0–2	Trabzonspor	Istanbul
16:00 TRT (UTC+3)			Trézéguet 75'; Destan 80'	Stadium: Siltaş Yapı Pendik Stadyumu; Referee: Halil Umut Meler

25 February 2024 27	Trabzonspor	1–0	Adana Demirspor	Trabzon
16:00	Trézéguet 21'; Özdemir (yellow card) 82'; Elmalı (yellow card) 83'		Balotelli (yellow card) 44'; Mendoza (yellow card) 90'; Rodríguez (red card) 90+4'; Nani (yellow card) 90+5'	Stadium: Papara Park; Referee: Burak Şeker

4 March 2024 28	Alanyaspor	3–1	Trabzonspor	Alanya
20:00				Stadium: Alanya Oba Stadium; Referee: Volkan Bayarslan

9 March 2024 29	Trabzonspor	5–1	Fatih Karagümrük	Trabzon
19:00				Stadium: Papara Park

17 March 2024 30	Trabzonspor	2–3	Fenerbahçe	Trabzon
20:30	Bardhi 63'; Trézéguet 78' (pen.)		Fred 13', 45+4'; Batshuayi 87'	Stadium: Papara Park; Referee: Halil Umut Meler

3 April 2024 31	Konyaspor	1–3	Trabzonspor	Konya
20:30	Nzonzi 79'		Trézéguet 19'; Višća 59' (pen.); Fountas 89'	Stadium: Konya Metropolitan Municipality Stadium; Referee: Atilla Karaoğlan

12 April 2024 32	Trabzonspor	0–1	Sivasspor	Trabzon
20:00			Menig 52'	Stadium: Papara Park; Referee: Ümit Öztürk

20 April 2024 33	Kayserispor	1–2	Trabzonspor	Kayseri
19:00	Bourabia 87'		Destan 24'; Pépé 58'	Stadium: Kadir Has Stadium; Referee: Çağdaş Altay

28 April 2024 34	Trabzonspor	4–2	Gaziantep	Trabzon
19:00	Onuachu 50', 66', 68'; Bardhi 65'		Sorescu 12'; Drăguș 21'	Stadium: Papara Park; Referee: Direnç Tonusluoğlu

4 May 2024 35	Samsunspor	3–1	Trabzonspor	Samsun
19:00	Antalyalı 14' (pen.); Mouandilmadji 28'; Fernández 36' (o.g.)		Bardhi 32'	Stadium: Samsun 19 Mayıs Stadium; Attendance: 26,992; Referee: Abdulkadir Bitigen

12 May 2024 36	Trabzonspor	3–0	İstanbulspor	Trabzon
19:00	Onuachu 6', 7'; Meunier 49'			Stadium: Papara Park; Attendance: 51; Referee: Emre Kargın

19 May 2024 37	İstanbul Başakşehir	0–1	Trabzonspor	Istanbul
19:00			Onuachu 45+2'	Stadium: Başakşehir Fatih Terim Stadium; Attendance: 3,815; Referee: Tugay Kaan Numanoğlu

26 May 2024 38	Trabzonspor	4–2	Ankaragücü	Trabzon
19:00				Stadium: Papara Park

=== Turkish Cup ===
6 December 2023 Fourth round	Trabzonspor	3–1	Çorum	Trabzon
21:00	Fountas 3'; Destan 19'; Bakasetas 61'		Verheydt 16'	Stadium: Papara Park; Referee: Direnç Tonusluoğlu

18 January 2024 Fifth round	Trabzonspor	3–1	Manisa	Trabzon
19:00	Fountas 7'; Destan 28', 69'		Korenica 15'	Stadium: Papara Park; Referee: Turgut Doman

8 February 2024 Round of 16	Gençlerbirliği	1–2 (a.e.t.)	Trabzonspor	Ankara
17:30	Bostan 14'		Elmalı 90'; Trézéguet 105+1'	Stadium: Eryaman Stadium; Referee: Mert Güzenge

28 February 2024 Quarter-finals	Trabzonspor	1–0	İstanbul Başakşehir	Trabzon
17:30	Bardhi (yellow card) 39'; Višća 57'		Souza (yellow card) 44'; Davidson (yellow card) 90+8'	Stadium: Papara Park; Referee: Kadir Sağlam

24 April 2024 Semi-finals; First leg	Trabzonspor	3–2	Fatih Karagümrük	Trabzon
20:30	Višća 15'; Elmalı (yellow card) 40'; Denswil 41'; Destan (red card) 45'; Fountas (yellow card) 44', (goal) 49'		Mendes 22'; Biraschi (yellow card) 44'; Mor (yellow card) 45+4'; Mercan (yellow card) 58'; Paoletti 80'; Eysseric (yellow card) 90+1'	Stadium: Papara Park; Referee: Ali Şansalan

8 May 2024 Semi-finals; Second leg	Fatih Karagümrük	0–4 (2–7 agg.)	Trabzonspor	Istanbul
20:30	Paoletti (yellow card) 73'		Onuachu 54'; Fountas 69'; Bozok 73' (pen.), 77'	Stadium: Atatürk Olympic Stadium; Referee: Cihan Aydın

23 May 2024 Final	Beşiktaş	3–2	Trabzonspor	Istanbul
20:45 TRT (UTC+3)	Ghezzal 45+3' (pen.); Uçan 54'; Svensson (yellow card) 79'; Al-Musrati 90+4', (yellow card) 90+5'		Onuachu 13'; Meunier (yellow card) 52'; Bardhi (yellow card) 83'; Pépé 89'	Stadium: Atatürk Olympic Stadium; Referee: Ali Şansalan
