= Abdülkadir Ömür =

Turkish footballer (born 1999)

- Ömür with Trabzonspor in 2017

Personal information
- Full name: Abdülkadir Ömür
- Date of birth: 25 June 1999 (age 27)
- Place of birth: Çarşıbaşı,Trabzon, Turkey
- Height: 1.68 m (5 ft 6 in)
- Positions: Attacking midfielder; winger

Team information
- Current team: Hull City
- Number: 33

Youth career
- 2011–2016: Trabzonspor

Senior career*
Years	Team	Apps	(Gls)
2016–2024	Trabzonspor	175	(22)
2024–	Hull City	36	(0)
2025	→ Çaykur Rizespor (loan)	6	(0)
2025–2026	→ Antalyaspor (loan)	25	(0)

International career^{‡}
2015–2016	Turkey U17	6	(1)
2016–2017	Turkey U19	9	(1)
2017–2018	Turkey U21	7	(0)
2019–	Turkey	14	(0)
- * Club domestic league appearances and goals as of 20:37, 28 July 2026 (UTC) ‡ National team caps and goals as of 4 June 2024

Abdülkadir Ömür (born 25 June 1999) is a Turkish professional footballer who plays as an attacking midfielder or winger for Premier League club Hull City and the Turkey national team.

== Club career ==
=== Early career ===
Born in Çarşıbaşı, Trabzon in 1999, Ömür was scouted by Trabzonspor scouting team and he got a chance to have trial matches. After that, Ömür joined the Trabzonspor youth team in 2011.

=== Trabzonspor ===
In 2016, Ömür was called up for the Trabzonspor first team. On 12 January 2016, Ömür made his senior team debut in the Turkish Cup against Adanaspor at Adana 5 Ocak Stadium, replacing Soner Aydoğdu in the 65th minute.

On 17 December 2016, he made his Süper Lig debut against İstanbul Başakşehir, replacing Serge Akakpo in the 82nd minute in a 0–1 loss.

On 22 December 2016, he scored his first senior goal in the Turkish Cup against Kızılcabölükspor at the 35th minute of a 5–0 win.

In January 2019, it was rumoured that Ömür had signed for English side Liverpool, however Liverpool denied making any offer for the player.

=== Hull City ===
On 1 February 2024, signed for English Championship club Hull City for an undisclosed fee, signing a three-and-a-half-year contract. He made his debut on 10 February, coming off the bench as a 76th-minute substitute for Fábio Carvalho, in the 1–0 loss at home to Swansea City.

==== Çaykur Rizespor (loan) ====
On 10 February 2025, Ömür moved to Çaykur Rizespor on loan for the remainder of the 2024–25 season.

==== Antalyaspor (loan) ====
On 26 July 2025, Ömür returned to Turkey on loan once again, joining Antalyaspor for the season.

== International career ==
Ömür earned his first call up for the Turkey senior team in March 2018 for a friendly against Republic of Ireland. He was an unused substitute as Turkey won 1–0. He made his debut on 30 May 2019, in a friendly against Greece, as a half-time substitute for Kenan Karaman.

== Career statistics ==
=== Club ===
As of match played 25 August 2026

Appearanced and goals by club, season and competition
Club	Season	League			National cup (Note: Includes Turkish Cup)		League cup (Note: Includes EFL Cup)		Continental		Other		Total	
Club	Season	Division	Apps	Goals	Apps	Goals	Apps	Goals	Apps	Goals	Apps	Goals	Apps	Goals
Trabzonspor	2015–16	Süper Lig	0	0	2	0	—		—		—		2	0
Trabzonspor	2016–17	Süper Lig	2	0	3	1	—		—		—		5	1
Trabzonspor	2017–18	Süper Lig	29	3	3	0	—		—		—		32	3
Trabzonspor	2018–19	Süper Lig	29	5	3	0	—		—		—		32	5
Trabzonspor	2019–20	Süper Lig	14	3	3	1	—		4 (Note: Appearances in UEFA Europa League)	0	—		21	4
Trabzonspor	2020–21	Süper Lig	23	2	0	0	—		—		—		23	2
Trabzonspor	2021–22	Süper Lig	33	7	3	0	—		2 (Note: Appearances in UEFA Europa Conference League)	0	—		38	7
Trabzonspor	2022–23	Süper Lig	29	2	1	1	—		10 (Note: Two appearances in UEFA Champions League, six appearances in UEFA Europa League, two appearances in UEFA Europa Conference League)	0	1 (Note: Appearance in Turkish Super Cup)	0	41	3
Trabzonspor	2023–24	Süper Lig	16	0	1	0	—		—		—		17	0
Trabzonspor	Total		175	22	19	3	—		16	0	1	0	211	25
Hull City	2023–24	Championship	16	0	—		—		—		—		16	0
Hull City	2024–25	Championship	20	0	—		1	0	—		—		21	0
Hull City	2026–27	Premier League	0	0	0	0	1	0	—		—		1	0
Hull City	Total		36	0	—		2	0	—		—		38	0
Çaykur Rizespor (loan)	2024–25	Süper Lig	6	0	1	0	—		—		—		7	0
Antalyaspor (loan)	2025–26	Süper Lig	25	0	3	0	—		—		—		28	0
Career total			242	22	23	3	2	0	16	0	1	0	284	25

=== International ===
As of match played 4 June 2024

Appearances and goals by national team and year
National team	Year	Apps	Goals
Turkey	2019	4	0
Turkey	2020	3	0
Turkey	2021	3	0
Turkey	2023	2	0
Turkey	2024	2	0
Total		14	0

== Honours ==
Trabzonspor

- Süper Lig: 2021–22
- Turkish Cup: 2019–20
- Turkish Super Cup: 2022
