= Anthony Nwakaeme =

Nigerian footballer (born 1989)

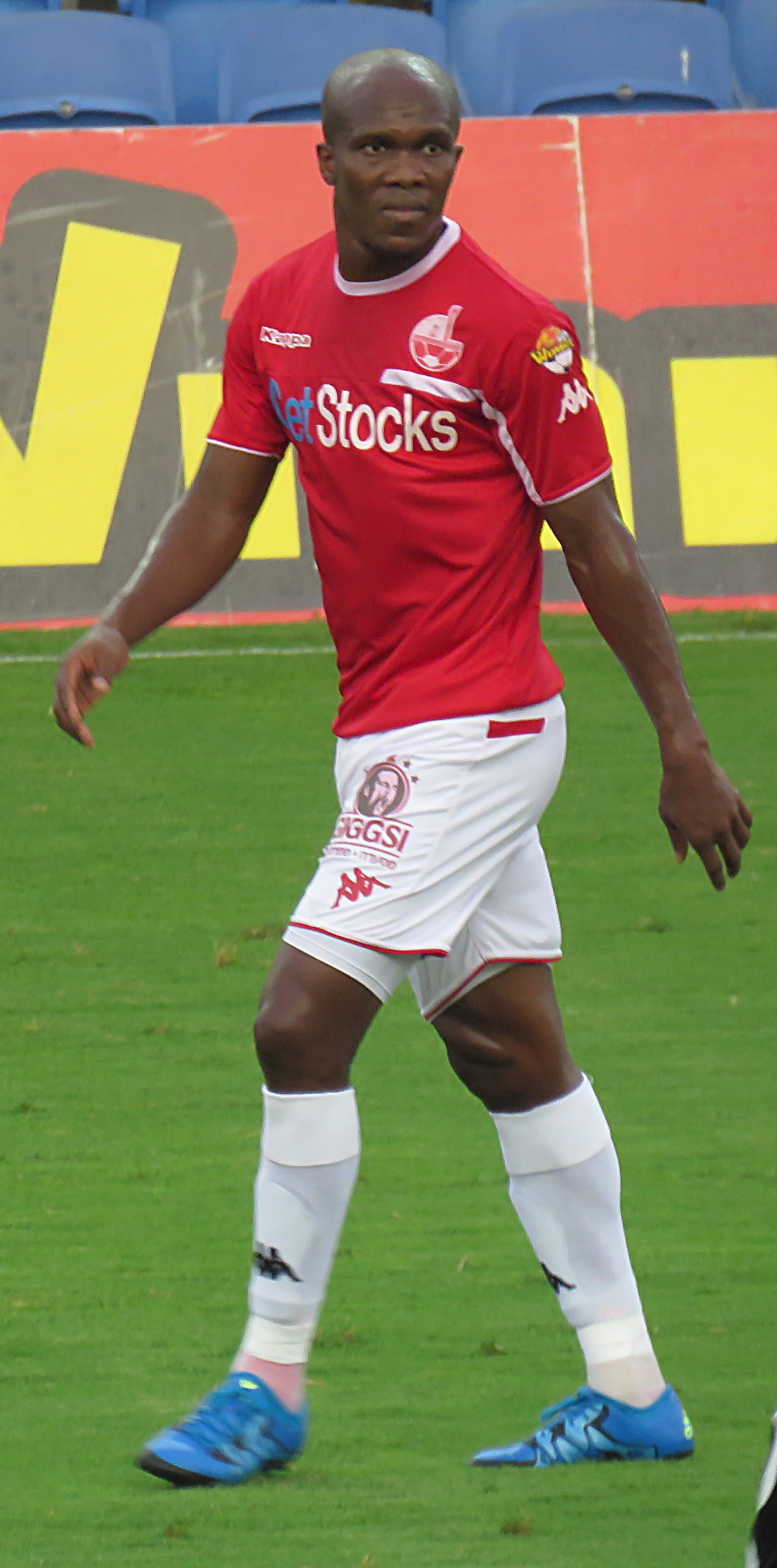
- Nwakaeme with Hapoel Be'er Sheva in 2015

Personal information
- Full name: Anthony Nnaduzor Nwakaeme
- Date of birth: 21 March 1989 (age 37)
- Place of birth: Lagos, Nigeria
- Height: 1.85 m (6 ft 1 in)
- Position: Left winger

Youth career
- 2006–2009: Vejle Football Academy

Senior career*
Years	Team	Apps	(Gls)
2010–2012	Universitatea Cluj	37	(8)
2010–2011	→ Arieșul Turda	8	(5)
2012–2013	Petrolul Ploiești	3	(0)
2013–2013	Universitatea Cluj	10	(2)
2013–2015	Hapoel Ra'anana	55	(13)
2015–2018	Hapoel Be'er Sheva	95	(35)
2018–2022	Trabzonspor	120	(41)
2022–2024	Al-Fayha	45	(13)
2024–2026	Trabzonspor	35	(1)

International career
2017	Nigeria	1	(0)
- * Club domestic league appearances and goals as of 00:23, 21 May 2026 (UTC)

Anthony Nnaduzor "Tony" Nwakaeme (born 21 March 1989) is a Nigerian professional footballer who plays as a left winger.

== Club career ==
In 2008, Tony played for Kristianstad BoIS, a lower division team. He didn’t get signed by Kristianstad. He also stayed with his trainer at his home, who helped him when he got sick.

=== Arieșul Turda ===
Anthony Nwakaeme began his career in 2010 at Romanian club Arieșul Turda of the Second Division, on loan from Universitatea Cluj. He played eight games and scored five goals.

=== Universitatea Cluj ===
In January 2011, he returned to Universitatea Cluj and his most productive season came in 2011–12, when he appeared in 28 matches and scored seven goals.

=== Petrolul Ploiești ===
In the 2012–13 season, he spent the first half at Petrolul Ploiești, playing just three matches.

=== Return to Universitatea Cluj ===
In February 2013, he returned to Universitatea Cluj and appeared in ten matches and scored two goals.

=== Hapoel Ra'anana ===
On 13 August 2013, Nwakaeme signed for Hapoel Ra'anana. On 31 August, he scored a goal on his Israeli Premier League debut, a 1–1 draw against Hapoel Haifa.

=== Hapoel Be'er Sheva ===
On 24 June 2015, Nwakaeme signed to Hapoel Be'er Sheva. On 3 October 2015, he scored his debut goal for Be'er Sheva. This goal was also the debut goal in Turner Stadium.

Nwakaeme won the Israeli Premier League best player trophy in 2017.

Along with Nigerian midfielder John Ogu and Israeli strikers Ben Sahar and Elyaniv Barda, he led Hapoel Be'er Sheva to a historical series of three Israeli championship titles in a row in 2016, 2017 and 2018.

=== Trabzonspor ===
In August 2018, Nwakaeme joined Turkish Süper Lig side Trabzonspor.

== International career ==
On 10 November 2017, he made his debut for Nigeria national team against Algeria in 1–1 draw counting for the 2018 World Cup qualifiers.

In April 2019, he said he deserved to make a further appearance for Nigeria.

== Personal life ==
Anthony Nwakaeme is the younger brother of professional footballer Dickson Nwakaeme.

== Career statistics ==
As of 17 January 2025

Appearances and goals by club, season and competition
Club	Season	League			National cup (Note: Includes Cupa României, Israel State Cup, Turkish Cup, King's Cup)		League cup (Note: Includes Toto Cup)		Continental		Other		Total	
Club	Season	Division	Apps	Goals	Apps	Goals	Apps	Goals	Apps	Goals	Apps	Goals	Apps	Goals
Arieșul Turda	2010–11	Liga II	8	5	0	0	–		–		–		8	5
Universitatea Cluj	2010–11	Liga I	9	1	0	0	–		–		–		9	1
Universitatea Cluj	2011–12	Liga I	28	7	1	0	–		–		–		29	7
Universitatea Cluj	2012–13	Liga I	10	2	0	0	–		–		–		11	2
Universitatea Cluj	Total		47	10	1	0	–		–		–		48	10
Petrolul Ploiești	2012–13	Liga I	3	0	1	0	–		–		–		4	0
Hapoel Ra'anana	2013–14	Israeli Premier League	30	6	2	0	–		–		–		32	6
Hapoel Ra'anana	2014–15	Israeli Premier League	25	7	2	0	3	0	–		–		30	7
Hapoel Ra'anana	Total		55	13	4	0	3	0	–		–		62	13
Hapoel Be'er Sheva	2015–16	Israeli Premier League	34	11	4	2	6	0	2 (Note: Appearances in UEFA Europa League)	0	–		46	13
Hapoel Be'er Sheva	2016–17	Israeli Premier League	33	14	1	0	1	2	13 (Note: Six appearances in UEFA Champions League, seven appearances and two goals in UEFA Europa League)	2	1 (Note: Appearance in Israel Super Cup)	1	49	19
Hapoel Be'er Sheva	2017–18	Israeli Premier League	28	10	3	1	2	0	11 (Note: Six appearances and four goals in UEFA Champions League, five appearances and one goal in UEFA Europa League)	5	1	1	45	17
Hapoel Be'er Sheva	2018–19	Israeli Premier League	0	0	0	0	0	0	4 (Note: Two appearances in UEFA Champions League, two appearances and one goal in UEFA Europa League)	1	1	0	5	1
Hapoel Be'er Sheva	Total		95	35	8	3	9	2	30	8	3	2	145	50
Trabzonspor	2018–19	Süper Lig	27	10	4	1	–		–		–		31	11
Trabzonspor	2019–20	Süper Lig	29	11	6	2	–		8	1	–		43	14
Trabzonspor	2020–21	Süper Lig	34	7	1	0	–		–		1 (Note: Appearance in Turkish Super Cup)	0	36	7
Trabzonspor	2021–22	Süper Lig	30	13	2	1	–		4 (Note: Appearances in UEFA Europa Conference League)	1	–		36	15
Trabzonspor	Total		120	41	13	4	–		12	2	1	0	146	47
Al-Fayha	2022–23	Saudi Pro League	25	9	2	0	–		–		1 (Note: Appearance in Saudi Super Cup)	0	28	9
Al-Fayha	2023–24	Saudi Pro League	20	4	2	0	–		3 (Note: Appearances in AFC Champions League)	2	–		25	6
Al-Fayha	Total		45	13	4	0	–		3	2	1	0	53	15
Trabzonspor	2024–25	Süper Lig	11	1	1	1	–		0	0	–		12	2
Career total			377	117	31	7	12	2	45	12	5	2	470	140

== Honours ==
Hapoel Be'er Sheva

- Israeli Premier League: 2015–16, 2016–17, 2017–18
- Toto Cup: 2016–17
- Israel Super Cup: 2016, 2017

Trabzonspor

- Süper Lig: 2021–22
- Turkish Cup: 2019–20, 2025–26
- Turkish Super Cup: 2020
