= Uğurcan Çakır =

Turkish footballer (born 1996)

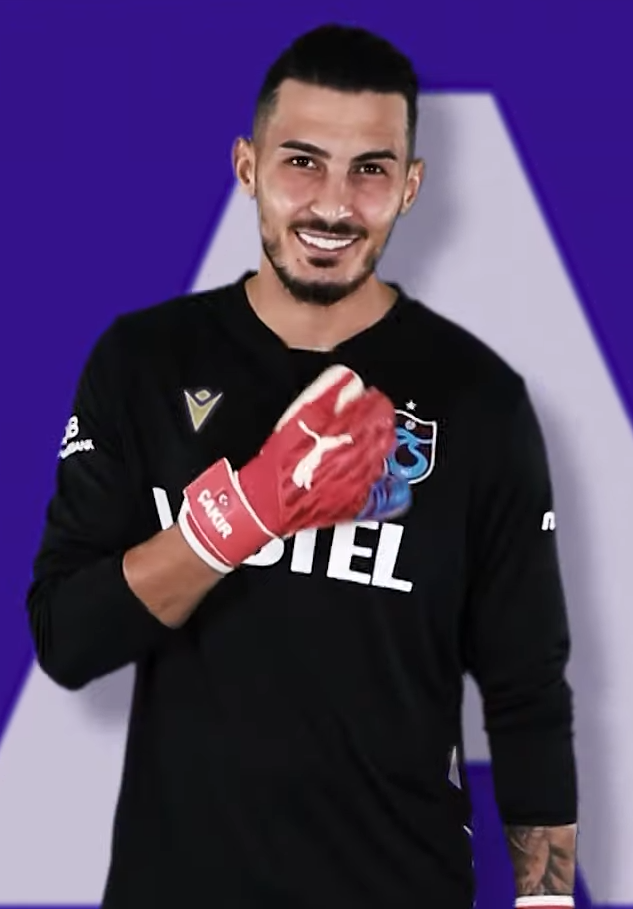
- Çakır with Trabzonspor in 2021

Personal information
- Full name: Uğurcan Çakır
- Date of birth: 5 April 1996 (age 30)
- Place of birth: Antalya, Turkey
- Height: 1.91 m (6 ft 3 in)
- Position: Goalkeeper

Team information
- Current team: Galatasaray
- Number: 1

Youth career
- 2008–2009: Çekmeköyspor
- 2009–2011: Yamanspor
- 2011–2012: 1461 Trabzon
- 2012–2014: Trabzonspor

Senior career*
Years	Team	Apps	(Gls)
2014–2025	Trabzonspor	235	(0)
2016	→ 1461 Trabzon (loan)	8	(0)
2025–	Galatasaray	30	(0)

International career^{‡}
2013–2014	Turkey U19	3	(0)
2014	Turkey U20	2	(0)
2017	Turkey U21	4	(0)
2019–	Turkey	46	(0)
- * Club domestic league appearances and goals as of 19 September 2026 ‡ National team caps and goals as of 16 November 2026

Uğurcan Çakır (born 5 April 1996) is a Turkish professional footballer who plays as a goalkeeper for Süper Lig club Galatasaray and the Turkey national team.

== Club career ==
=== Trabzonspor ===
Çakır made his senior debut for Trabzonspor in a 1–0 loss to Rabotnicki Skopje during the qualifying rounds of the UEFA Europa League. He later played three matches in the Turkish Cup, keeping two clean sheets. After these appearances, he established himself as the club's second-choice goalkeeper, remaining on the bench until January without making any appearances in the Super Lig.

Like many young Trabzonspor goalkeepers, Çakır was loaned to the club's local affiliate 1461 Trabzon on 15 January 2016. He made his senior debut for the club in a 2–1 win over Yeni Malatyaspor. He continued as 1461 Trabzon's first-choice goalkeeper for three additional appearances in the TFF First League, conceding seven goals without keeping a clean sheet. He later suffered an ankle injury that kept him out for two months. After returning, he played four more matches but was eventually dropped due to underwhelming performances. His one-year loan spell was cut short, and he returned to Trabzonspor on 30 June 2016.

Following his return, Çakır did not make any appearances for Trabzonspor in any competition, largely due to his performances during the previous loan spell with 1461 Trabzon. He was named on the bench for two Super Lig matches and most Turkish Cup fixtures.

Çakır eventually made his Trabzonspor debut at the age of 21 on 22 September 2017 against Alanyaspor. He came on at halftime after first-choice goalkeeper Esteban Alvarado was forced off with an injury. Trabzonspor had been leading 3–1 at halftime but ultimately lost the match 4–3 after two penalties were awarded to the opposition. Despite the defeat, Çakır impressed manager Ersun Yanal, which led to him starting the final five matches of the Super Lig season. During that period he conceded twelve goals and kept one clean sheet, continuing his development as a young goalkeeper.

Çakır later reaffirmed his role as the second-choice goalkeeper for Trabzonspor. However, after first-choice goalkeeper Onur Kivrak retired on 16 January 2019, he became the club's primary goalkeeper. He went on to play eighteen matches in the Super Lig, conceding twenty goals and recording two clean sheets.

He won his first trophy with the club by lifting the 2019–20 Turkish Cup. He was named as club's captain ahead of the 2020–21 season following the departure of José Sosa. He later achieved the 2021–22 Süper Lig title, which marked Trabzonspor's first league championship in 38 years.

=== Galatasaray ===
On 2 September 2025, Galatasaray announced that they reached an agreement with Trabzonspor for the transfer of Çakır for €27.5 million transfer fee. Çakır, who signed a five-year contract with Galatasaray, will receive €2.5 million of guaranteed money and bonuses annually. On 13 September, he made his debut with the team against Eyüpspor with a clean sheet in a 2–0 away Süper Lig win. On 18 September, he made his continental debut with the team against Eintracht Frankfurt in a 5–1 UEFA Champions League away defeat.

== International career ==
Çakır made his debut for the Turkey national team on 30 May 2019, in a friendly against Greece, as a starter.

In June 2021, he was included in the list of 26 Turkish players to compete for UEFA Euro 2020. On 7 June 2024, he was named in the final list of 26 players selected by Vincenzo Montella to compete for UEFA Euro 2024.

On 2 June 2026, Çakır was selected in the 26-man squad for the 2026 FIFA World Cup.

== Career statistics ==
=== Club ===
As of match played 19 September 2026

Appearances and goals by club, season and competition
Club	Season	League			Turkish Cup		Europe		Other		Total	
Club	Season	Division	Apps	Goals	Apps	Goals	Apps	Goals	Apps	Goals	Apps	Goals
Trabzonspor	2014–15	Süper Lig	0	0	0	0	0	0	—		0	0
Trabzonspor	2015–16	Süper Lig	0	0	2	0	1 (Note: Appearance(s) in UEFA Europa League)	0	—		3	0
Trabzonspor	2016–17	Süper Lig	0	0	0	0	—		—		0	0
Trabzonspor	2017–18	Süper Lig	6	0	0	0	—		—		6	0
Trabzonspor	2018–19	Süper Lig	20	0	5	0	—		—		25	0
Trabzonspor	2019–20	Süper Lig	33	0	3	0	7	0	—		43	0
Trabzonspor	2020–21	Süper Lig	38	0	0	0	—		1 (Note: Appearance in Turkish Super Cup)	0	39	0
Trabzonspor	2021–22	Süper Lig	36	0	3	0	4 (Note: Appearances in UEFA Europa Conference League)	0	—		43	0
Trabzonspor	2022–23	Süper Lig	31	0	3	0	9 (Note: Two appearances in UEFA Champions League, five appearances in UEFA Europa League, two appearances in UEFA Europa Conference League)	0	1	0	44	0
Trabzonspor	2023–24	Süper Lig	35	0	7	0	—		—		42	0
Trabzonspor	2024–25	Süper Lig	32	0	5	0	6 (Note: Four appearances in UEFA Europa League, two appearances in UEFA Conference League)	0	—		43	0
Trabzonspor	2025–26	Süper Lig	4	0	—		—		—		4	0
Trabzonspor	Total		235	0	28	0	27	0	2	0	292	0
1461 Trabzon (loan)	2015–16	1. Lig	8	0	1	0	—		—		9	0
Galatasaray	2025–26	Süper Lig	25	0	0	0	12 (Note: Appearances in UEFA Champions League)	0	1	0	38	0
Galatasaray	2026–27	Süper Lig	5	0	0	0	1	0	0	0	6	0
Galatasaray	Total		30	0	0	0	13	0	1	0	44	0
Career total			273	0	29	0	40	0	3	0	345	0

=== International ===
As of match played 15 November 2026

Appearances and goals by national team and year
National team	Year	Apps	Goals
Turkey	2019	2	0
Turkey	2020	2	0
Turkey	2021	13	0
Turkey	2022	5	0
Turkey	2023	4	0
Turkey	2024	3	0
Turkey	2025	7	0
Turkey	2026	10	0
Total		46	0

== Honours ==
Trabzonspor

- Süper Lig: 2021–22
- Turkish Cup: 2019–20
- Turkish Super Cup: 2020, 2022

Galatasaray

- Süper Lig: 2025–26

Individual

- Süper Lig Team of the Season: 2020–21, 2024–25, 2025–26
