= Filip Novák (footballer) =

Czech footballer (born 1990)

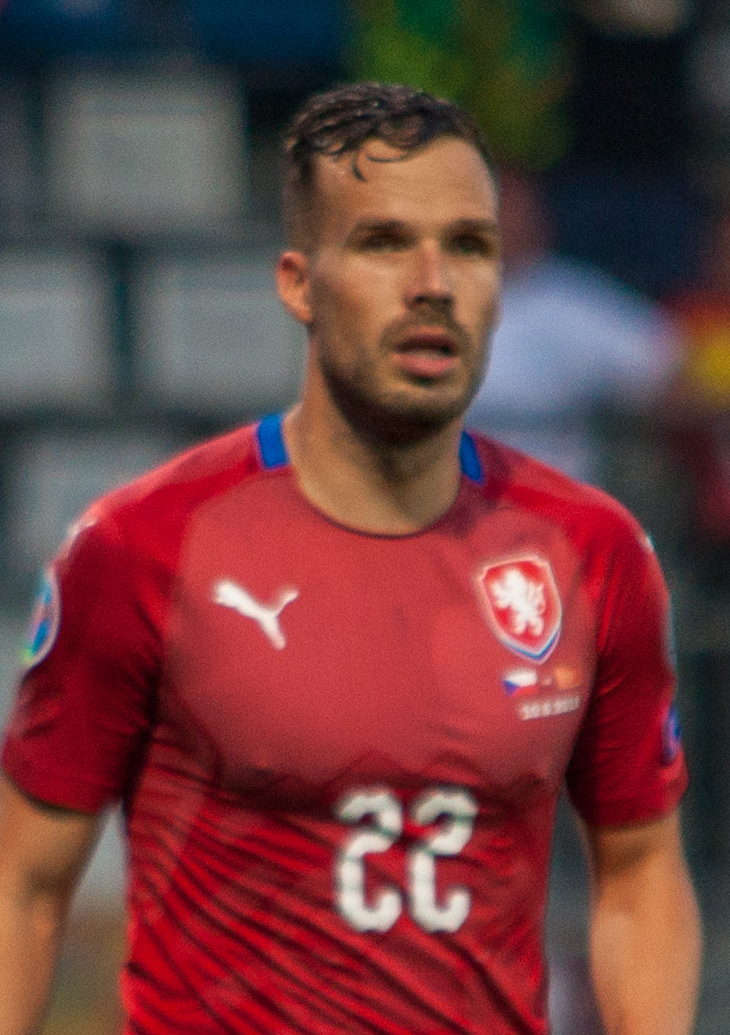
- Novák with Czech Republic in 2020

Personal information
- Date of birth: 26 June 1990 (age 36)
- Place of birth: Přerov, Czechoslovakia
- Height: 1.84 m (6 ft 0 in)
- Position: Left-back

Team information
- Current team: Jablonec
- Number: 57

Senior career*
Years	Team	Apps	(Gls)
2009–2011	Zlín	58	(9)
2011–2015	Jablonec	106	(14)
2015–2018	Midtjylland	73	(10)
2018–2020	Trabzonspor	74	(15)
2020–2022	Fenerbahçe	38	(4)
2022–2023	Al Jazira	10	(0)
2023–2024	Sigma Olomouc	12	(2)
2025–	Jablonec	32	(1)

International career^{‡}
2009	Czech Republic U19	4	(0)
2011	Czech Republic U20	1	(0)
2011–2012	Czech Republic U21	6	(1)
2015–	Czech Republic	27	(2)
- * Club domestic league appearances and goals as of 27 May 2026 ‡ National team caps and goals as of 11 November 2021

Filip Novák (born 26 June 1990) is a Czech professional footballer who plays as a left-back for Jablonec and the Czech Republic national team. He holds the Czech First League record for most goals scored in one season by a defender with 11 goals in the 2014–15 season.

== Club career ==
Novák began playing football for his home team in Přerov. He moved to Zlín in 2007 and then signed for Jablonec in 2011.

=== Zlín ===
Novák played in the Czech premier league for the first time against Příbram when he was 18 years old. Then, he played only one whole match before his team was relegated to the second league in the end of the season 2008–09. It was an advantage for him because there was a less strong competition so he climbed to the top players of the team gradually.

=== Jablonec ===
In July 2011, Novák moved to Jablonec. He scored his first goal in the Czech First League against Dukla Prague on 1 October 2012. On 17 May 2013, Novák won the Czech Cup with Jablonec, after playing he whole final match and scoring in the penalty shootout. He won the Czech Supercup against the league champion, FC Viktoria Plzeň with Jablonec on 12 July 2013. By winning the Czech Cup in the previous season, Jablonec qualified for the UEFA Europa League where they eliminated Strømsgodset IF in the Third Qualifying Round before being eliminated by Real Betis in the Play-off round.

=== Al Jazira ===
On 30 September 2022, Novák moved to Al Jazira.

=== Sigma Olomouc ===
On 3 November 2023, Novák signed a contract with Sigma Olomouc until end of the season.

=== Jablonec ===
On 21 February 2025, Novák signed a contract with Jablonec as a free agent.

== International career ==
=== Youth ===
Novák was a part of the Czech Republic national under-21 football team which was playing in the European Under-21 Championship qualification in 2013. He scored his first under-21 goal against Wales. They ran up from the group 3 as the winner but unfortunately were beaten by Russia in play-off round to the final tournament.

=== Senior ===
Novák's debut for the Czech Republic national team was on 31 March 2015 in a friendly match against Slovakia; he played the last 10 minutes of the game.

== Career statistics ==
=== Club ===
As of 22 January 2023

Appearances and goals by club, season and competition
Club	Season	League			Cup		Continental		Other		Total	
Club	Season	Division	Apps	Goals	Apps	Goals	Apps	Goals	Apps	Goals	Apps	Goals
Zlín	2008–09	Czech First League	3	0	0	0	—		—		3	0
Zlín	2009–10	2. liga	26	1	0	0	—		—		26	1
Zlín	2010–11	2. liga	29	8	0	0	—		—		29	8
Zlín	Total		58	9	0	0	—		—		58	9
Jablonec	2011–12	Czech First League	18	0	2	0	3	0	—		23	0
Jablonec	2012–13	Czech First League	29	3	5	1	—		—		34	4
Jablonec	2013–14	Czech First League	27	0	7	0	3	0	1	0	38	0
Jablonec	2014–15	Czech First League	29	11	8	1	—		—		37	12
Jablonec	2015–16	Czech First League	3	0	—		4	0	—		7	0
Jablonec	Total		106	14	22	2	10	0	1	0	139	16
Midtjylland	2015–16	Danish Superliga	23	2	0	0	8	1	—		31	3
Midtjylland	2016–17	Danish Superliga	34	5	4	1	7	3	—		45	9
Midtjylland	2017–18	Danish Superliga	16	3	2	1	3	0	—		21	4
Midtjylland	Total		73	10	6	2	18	4	—		97	16
Trabzonspor	2017–18	Süper Lig	15	3	—		—		—		15	3
Trabzonspor	2018–19	Süper Lig	29	5	3	1	—		—		32	6
Trabzonspor	2019–20	Süper Lig	30	7	5	2	7	1	—		42	10
Trabzonspor	Total		74	15	8	3	7	1	—		89	19
Fenerbahçe	2020–21	Süper Lig	18	1	2	0	—		—		20	1
Fenerbahçe	2021–22	Süper Lig	20	3	1	0	6	0	—		27	2
Fenerbahçe	2022–23	Süper Lig	0	0	0	0	4	0	—		4	0
Fenerbahçe	Total		38	4	3	0	10	0	—		51	3
Al-Jazira	2022–23	UAE Pro League	10	0	1	0	—		3 (Note: Appearances in UAE League Cup)	0	20	1
Career total			358	51	30	7	45	5	4	0	453	64

=== International goals ===
Scores and results list Czech Republic's goal tally first, score column indicates score after each Novák goal.

List of international goals scored by Filip Novák
No.	Date	Venue	Opponent	Score	Result	Competition
1	8 October 2017	Doosan Arena, Plzeň, Czech Republic	San Marino	4–0	5–0	2018 FIFA World Cup qualification
2	11 November 2021	Andrův stadion, Olomouc, Czech Republic	Kuwait	5–0	7–0	Friendly

== Honours ==
Jablonec

- Czech Cup: 2012–13
- Czech Supercup: 2013

Trabzonspor

- Turkish Cup: 2019–20
