= Caleb Ekuban =

Italian-born Ghanaian footballer (born 1994)

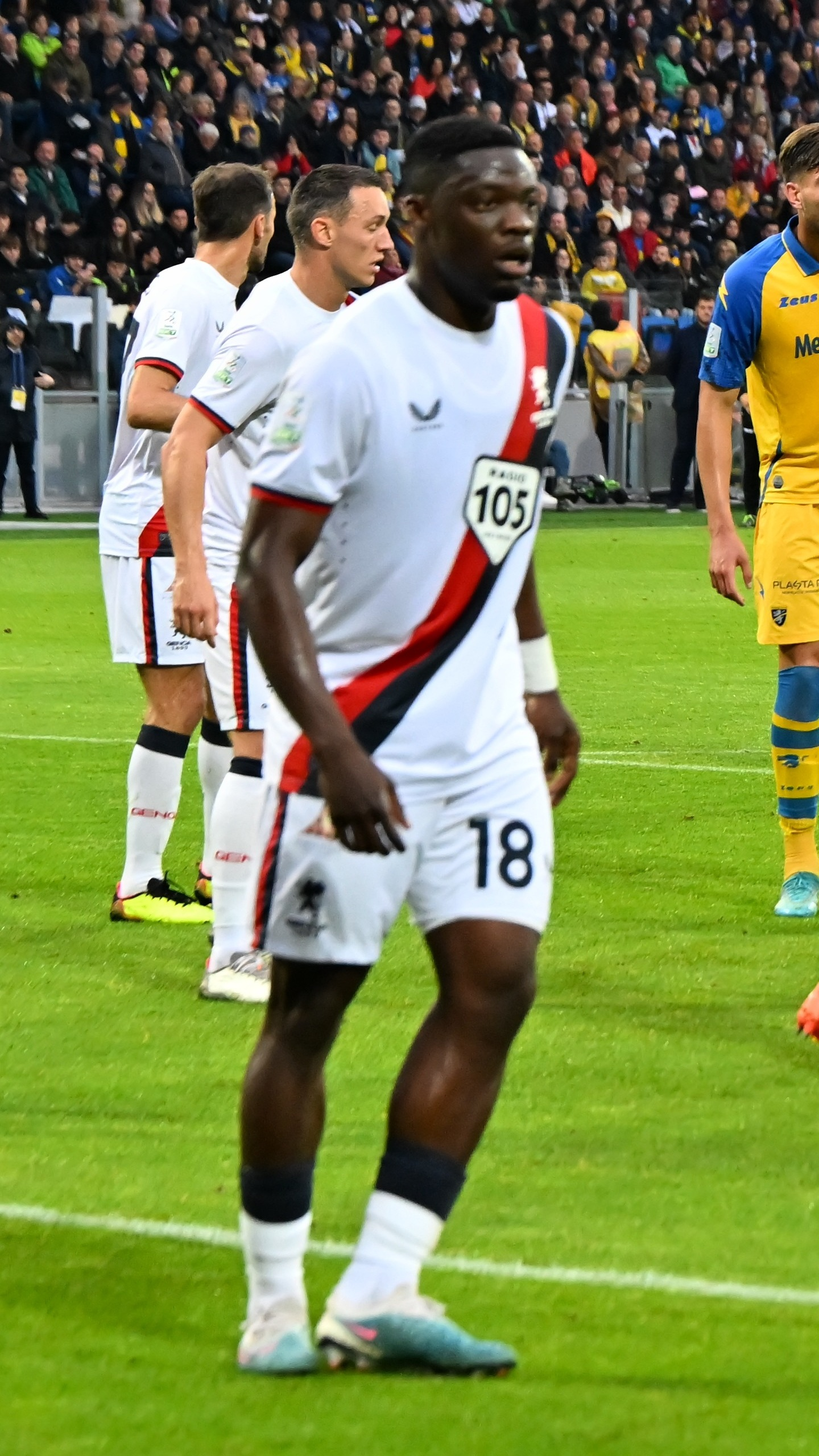
- Ekuban with Genoa in 2023

Personal information
- Full name: Caleb Ansah Ekuban
- Date of birth: 23 March 1994 (age 32)
- Place of birth: Villafranca di Verona, Italy
- Height: 1.82 m (6 ft 0 in)
- Position: Forward

Team information
- Current team: Hellas Verona
- Number: 81

Youth career
- 2004–2010: Mantova 1911
- 2010–2012: Chievo

Senior career*
Years	Team	Apps	(Gls)
2012–2017	Chievo	0	(0)
2013–2014	→ Südtirol (loan)	7	(1)
2014–2015	→ Lumezzane (loan)	48	(7)
2015–2016	→ Renate (loan)	31	(4)
2016–2017	→ Partizani (loan)	34	(17)
2017–2019	Leeds United	20	(1)
2018–2019	→ Trabzonspor (loan)	29	(5)
2019–2021	Trabzonspor	54	(15)
2021–2026	Genoa	122	(12)
2026–	Hellas Verona	0	(0)

International career^{‡}
2019–2021	Ghana	13	(3)
- * Club domestic league appearances and goals as of 20 September 2026 ‡ National team caps and goals as of 10 December 2022 (UTC)

Caleb Ansah Ekuban (born 23 March 1994) is a professional footballer who plays as a forward for Serie B club Hellas Verona. Born in Italy, Ekuban played for the Ghana national team.

== Early life ==
Caleb Ekuban was born in Villafranca di Verona, Italy, to Ghanaian parents, Rev. Kobina and Sabina Ekuban. Caleb's father is the district elder of the Pentecostal Assembly of Churches in Italy as well as an accountant and business entrepreneur.

Ekuban was one of seven children growing up in Italy. At the age of 10 his father was transferred to Mantova for ministerial duties and registered Ekuban along with two of his brothers with the Mantova youth team. Ekuban stood out and went on to be signed up by Chievo. He is fluent in Italian and is also able to speak Fanti, the major local dialect in the Central Region of Ghana.

One of his brothers Joseph is now a professional footballer as well, playing in Italy.

== Club career ==
=== Chievo Verona ===
After progressing through the youth system at Chievo, Ekuban was called up for the first time to the senior squad by the coach Eugenio Corini on 26 January 2013 for the Serie A match against Lazio, he remained an unused substitute as Chievo won 1–0 at Stadio Olimpico. Ekuban never appeared professionally for Chievo and was loaned out to four clubs over a four-year period and despite being contracted to the club until 2018, he was transferred to Leeds in July 2017.

==== Loan at Südtirol ====
In July 2013, Ekuban was sent on loan at Südtirol to gain more playing experience. In August he was the subject of racial abuse in a Coppa Italia first round match against Matera with the perpetrator later receiving a 10 match suspension. He made his professional debut on 1 September by playing in the last 31 minutes of the 1–1 home draw against Reggiana. He scored his first goal later on 13 October, giving his side a point in the match against Venezia. However, his spell at the club was short-lived, and after making only seven league appearances, which only two of them as a starter, Ekuban left the club in January 2014.

==== Loan at Lumezzane ====
In January 2014, Ekuban was loaned to fellow Lega Pro side Lumezzane for one and a half seasons. During his spell there, he played 48 league matches, scoring seven goals.

==== Loan at Renate ====
On 6 August 2015, Ekuban was loaned to Renate until the end of 2015–16 season. He played his first match for Renate on 6 September in a 1–0 away defeat to Mantova, playing the full 90 minutes. Ekuban scored his first goal of the season in his second league appearance for the new team on 13 September in the 1–1 home draw against Giana Erminio. He finished the 2015–16 season by playing 31 league matches, 24 of them as a starter, scoring 4 goals as Renate finished Group A in 11th position.

==== Loan at Partizani ====
On 4 July 2016, Ekuban completed a season long loan move to Kategoria Superiore side Partizani for the 2016–17 season and was given the number 45. Six days later, was named in Partizani's final 23-man UEFA Champions League squad. He made his competitive debut on 13 July in the first leg of Champions League second qualifying round against Ferencváros, playing in the last 23 minutes of the 1–1 draw at Elbasan Arena. In the returning leg one week later, Ekuban played again as a substitute, and after the regular and extra time had finished in a 1–1 draw, the game was decided on penalty shootout where Ekuban successfully converted his penalty shootout attempt, helping Partizani to win 3–1.

Ekuban played full-90 minutes in both legs of Champions League third qualifying round against Red Bull Salzburg, who eliminated Partizani with the aggregate 3–0. Then, Partizani moved to Europa League play-off round where they faced Krasnodar, losing 4–0 on aggregate; Ekuban played full-90 minutes in both legs, and finished his European campaign with six appearances.

Ekuban made his domestic debut on 7 September in the opening league match against Luftëtari, finished in a 1–0 away win. He opened his scoring account later on 18 September in the matchday 3 against Teuta, scoring the second goal of the 2–0 away win.

He made his Albanian Cup debut on 7 October in the returning leg of the first round against Kevitan, scoring the fourth goal of the 4–0 win, helping the team to secure the progression to the next round with the aggregate 9–1. On 13 October, in Sulejman Starova's first match in charge, Ekuban scored both goals in a 2–0 away win at Laçi, returning Partizani in the winning ways after two matches. Ekuban finished the 16/17 season as second top scorer in the Kategoria Superiore finishing the season with 17 league goals to his name (with 18 in all competitions). With his goals helping Partizani to a second-place finish in the league and UEFA Europa League qualification.

=== Leeds United ===
On 11 July 2017, Leeds United announced the signing of Ekuban on a four-year contract from Serie A side Chievo Verona for an undisclosed fee. On 13 July, Ekuban laughably revealed he was hoping to score goals like former Leeds legend and countryman Tony Yeboah. On 9 August 2017, he made his first-team debut in the League Cup tie 4–1 victory against Port Vale, with Ekuban scoring on his debut after an assist from Ezgjan Alioski, he also provided an assist for Samuel Saiz's hat trick goal in the same game.

On 19 August, Ekuban made his League debut against Sunderland replacing regular striker Chris Wood who pulled himself out the squad due to interest from a Premier League side. Ekuban however picked up an injury breaking a bone in his foot and had to be substituted in the second half.

He returned from injury against Middlesbrough on 19 November 2017, however Ekuban broke his foot again on 10 December in Leeds' 1–3 victory against QPR. Ekuban returned to the match day squad on 10 February against Sheffield United. On 30 March 2018, Ekuban scored his first league goal for Leeds against Bolton Wanderers.

With speculation that he was not in Marcelo Bielsa's plans, on 26 July 2018, Ekuban was not given a shirt number for Leeds for the upcoming 2018–19 season for Leeds.

==== Loan at Trabzonspor ====
On 29 August 2018, Ekuban joined Süper Lig side Trabzonspor on a season long loan. Ekuban made his debut coming on for Hugo Rodallega against Galatasaray in the 86th minute on 1 September 2018, scoring on his debut in a 4–0 victory. This goal held significance for some Leeds United fans due to a rivalry with the Turkish side Galatasaray. Ekuban was praised after scoring an emotional goal for Trabzonspor in a 2–0 win against Kayserispor after playing after the passing of his mother, the goal sparked an emotional celebration with his team-mates as he burst into tears.

On 19 December 2018, Ekuban took his tally to 5 goals in all competitions, after scoring a brace in a 5–0 win over Sivas Belediyespor in the Turkish Cup. He scored his 6th goal of the season against İstanbul Başakşehir on 20 January 2019 in a 4–2 defeat.

=== Trabzonspor ===
On 1 July 2019, Trabzonspor made the loan deal permanent and signed Caleb Ekuban for three years.

== International career ==
Ekuban was eligible to play for both Ghana and Italy at international level. On 12 July 2017, Ekuban revealed it is his intention to represent Ghana.

On 20 April 2018, Ekuban met with Ghana national team head coach Akwasi Appiah. In March 2019, Ekuban was called up to represent Ghana for 2019 Africa Cup of Nations qualification. He scored his first competitive goal for the Black Stars of Ghana on his debut against the Harambee Stars of Kenya in an AFCON Qualifier on 23 March 2019 at the Accra Sports Stadium.

== Style of play ==
Ekuban is a striker known for his pace, technical ability and strong physique. His style of play and prolific goal scoring as a youngster in the Chievo youth team saw him likened to compatriot Mario Balotelli.

== Career statistics ==
=== Club ===
As of match played 12 April 2026

Appearances and goals by club, season and competition
Club	Season	League			National cup (Note: Includes Coppa Italia, Albanian Cup, Turkish Cup)		League cup (Note: Includes EFL Cup)		Continental		Other		Total	
Club	Season	Division	Apps	Goals	Apps	Goals	Apps	Goals	Apps	Goals	Apps	Goals	Apps	Goals
ChievoVerona	2012–13	Serie A	0	0	0	0	—		—		—		0	0
Südtirol (loan)	2013–14	Lega Pro	7	1	2	1	—		—		—		9	2
Lumezzane (loan)	2013–14	Lega Pro	13	2	0	0	—		—		—		13	2
Lumezzane (loan)	2014–15	Lega Pro	35	5	2	0	—		—		—		37	5
Lumezzane (loan)	Total		48	7	2	0	—		—		—		50	7
Renate (loan)	2015–16	Lega Pro	31	4	2	0	—		—		—		33	4
Partizani (loan)	2016–17	Kategoria Superiore	34	17	2	1	—		6 (Note: Four appearances in UEFA Champions League, two appearances in UEFA Europa League)	0	—		42	18
Leeds United	2017–18	Championship	20	1	0	0	1	1	—		—		21	2
Trabzonspor	2018–19	Süper Lig	29	5	7	3	–		—		—		36	8
Trabzonspor	2019–20	Süper Lig	22	5	7	1	–		5 (Note: Appearances in UEFA Europa League)	4	—		34	10
Trabzonspor	2020–21	Süper Lig	32	10	0	0	–		—		1 (Note: Appearance in Turkish Super Cup)	1	33	11
Trabzonspor	Total		83	20	14	4	–		5	4	1	1	103	29
Genoa	2021–22	Serie A	30	1	3	1	—		—		—		33	2
Genoa	2022–23	Serie B	14	2	1	0	—		—		—		15	2
Genoa	2023–24	Serie A	29	4	1	0	—		—		—		30	4
Genoa	2024–25	Serie A	18	1	0	0	—		—		—		18	1
Genoa	2025–26	Serie A	27	4	1	0	—		—		—		28	4
Genoa	Total		118	12	6	1	—		—		—		124	13
Career total			341	61	28	7	1	1	11	4	1	1	382	74

=== International ===
As of match played 11 November 2021

Appearances and goals by national team and year
National team	Year	Apps	Goals
Ghana	2019	6	2
Ghana	2020	4	1
Ghana	2021	3	0
Total		13	3

Scores and results list Ghana's goal tally first.

List of international goals scored by Caleb Ekuban
No.	Date	Venue	Opponent	Score	Result	Competition
1.	23 March 2019	Accra Sports Stadium, Accra, Ghana	Kenya	1–0	1–0	2019 Africa Cup of Nations qualification
2.	26 March 2019	Accra Sports Stadium, Accra, Ghana	Mauritania	2–1	3–1	Friendly
3.	12 October 2020	Mardan Sports Complex, Aksu, Turkey	Qatar	5–1	5–1	Friendly

== Honours ==
Trabzonspor

- Turkish Cup: 2019–20
- Turkish Super Cup: 2020
