= Gastón Campi =

Argentine footballer (born 1991)

Personal information
- Full name: Gastón Matías Campi
- Date of birth: 6 April 1991 (age 35)
- Place of birth: Lanús, Argentina
- Height: 1.93 m (6 ft 4 in)
- Position: Centre-back

Team information
- Current team: Barracas Central
- Number: 37

Youth career
- Racing Club

Senior career*
Years	Team	Apps	(Gls)
2011–2017	Racing Club	270	(30)
2016–2017	→ Atlético de Rafaela (loan)	27	(1)
2017–2019	Estudiantes	30	(0)
2019	→ Chaves (loan)	41	(3)
2019–2021	Trabzonspor	72	(1)
2021	→ Fatih Karagümrük (loan)	76	(0)
2021–2022	Arouca	51	(4)
2022	Yeni Malatyaspor	16	(0)
2022–2025	San Lorenzo	69	(1)
2025–2026	Barcelona SC	34	(3)
2026–	Barracas Central	7	(0)
- * Club domestic league appearances and goals as of 17:12, 3 June 2026 (UTC)

Gastón Matías Campi (born 6 April 1991) is an Argentine professional footballer who plays as a defender for Barracas Central.

== Career ==
Campi started with Racing after the coordinator Fernando Bazan gave him the nod to the leadership. He debuted against Olympus in the first triumph of Racing in the Initial Tournament 2013. On 2 November 2013, in his second game, he scored his first goal against Gimnasia La Plata and made it 2–0, earning the title and Reinaldo Carlos' confidence "Mustard" Merlo.

At the beginning of 2014, Campi had an internal competition with the new reinforcement, Ex Velez, Francisco Cerro. Campi enters a minute left and scored the goal that represents the tie 3–3 against Estudiantes. He scored a goal in the last minute against Estudiantes to finalise the 3–3 in Avellaneda. Then against Olimpo he became the tie 1–1 with which ended the game.

Halfway through 2014 assumes Diego Cocca and with the arrival of Ezquiel Videla and Nelson Acevedo, is relegated as 4th midfielder. His only game in the was Cocca against San Lorenzo de Almagro, where Campi comes in late in the second period.

In July 2016, Campi joined English Championship side Reading on trial for the duration of their pre-season camp in The Netherlands. Reading decided not to offer Campi a contract after the trial.

On 5 January 2021, Campi was loaned to Fatih Karagümrük from Trabzonspor, for the second half of the 2020–21 season.

== Career statistics ==
As of match played 30 April 2016

Appearances and goals by club, season and competition
Club	Season	League			National Cup		Continental		Total	
Club	Season	Division	Apps	Goals	Apps	Goals	Apps	Goals	Apps	Goals
Racing Club	2013–14	Primera División	22	0	0	0	-		22	0
Racing Club	2014	Primera División	1	0	0	0	-		1	0
Racing Club	2015	Primera División	1	0	0	0	0	0	1	0
Racing Club	2016	Primera División	3	0	0	0	0	0	3	0
Racing Club	Total		27	0	0	0	0	0	27	0
Career total			27	0	0	0	0	0	27	0

== Honours ==
=== Club ===
Racing Club

- Primera División: 2014

Trabzonspor

- Turkish Cup: 2019–20
