= Abdulkadir Parmak =

Turkish footballer (born 1994)

Personal information
- Date of birth: 28 December 1994 (age 31)
- Place of birth: Trabzon, Turkey
- Height: 1.76 m (5 ft 9 in)
- Position: Midfielder

Team information
- Current team: Ümraniyespor
- Number: 20

Youth career
- 2005–2008: 1461 Soğuksuspor
- 2008–2011: Trabzon Akçaabat
- 2011–2013: Trabzonspor

Senior career*
Years	Team	Apps	(Gls)
2013–2016	1461 Trabzon	60	(5)
2013–2014	→ Ümraniyespor (loan)	16	(1)
2016–2023	Trabzonspor	75	(3)
2016–2017	→ Altınordu (loan)	24	(1)
2017–2018	→ Adana Demirspor (loan)	18	(0)
2022	→ Kayserispor (loan)	13	(1)
2022–2023	→ Gaziantep (loan)	9	(0)
2023–2024	Sivasspor	9	(0)
2024–2026	Hatayspor	41	(4)
2026	Bandırmaspor	14	(1)
2026–	Ümraniyespor	0	(0)

International career^{‡}
2019–	Turkey	1	(0)
- * Club domestic league appearances and goals as of 18 October 2026 ‡ National team caps and goals as of 10 September 2019

Abdulkadir Parmak (born 28 December 1994) is a Turkish professional footballer who plays as a midfielder for TFF 1. Lig club Ümraniyespor.

== Professional career ==
Parmak is a youth product of Trabzonspor, and spent his early career with their reserve team 1461 Trabzon before moving to Ümraniyespor on loan. He returned to Trabzonspor in 2016, and went on loan with Altınordu and Adana Demirspor before returning to their first team. He made his professional debut with Trabzonspor in a 2–0 loss to İstanbul Başakşehir on 12 August 2018.

On 27 July 2022, Parmak joined Gaziantep on a season-long loan.

On 15 July 2023, he signed two-year contract with Süper Lig club Sivasspor.

== International ==
He made his Turkey national team debut on 10 September 2019 in a Euro 2020 qualifier against Moldova. He replaced Dorukhan Toköz in the 87th minute.

== Honours ==
Trabzonspor

- Turkish Cup: 2019–20
- Turkish Super Cup (1): 2020
