= Berkay Sefa Kara =

Turkish footballer

Personal information
- Date of birth: 27 March 1999 (age 27)
- Place of birth: Trabzon, Turkey
- Height: 1.72 m (5 ft 8 in)
- Position: Winger

Team information
- Current team: Beykoz Anadolu
- Number: 11

Youth career
- 2010–2011: Balıkesirspor
- 2011–2017: Fenerbahçe

Senior career*
| Years | Team | Apps | (Gls) |
| 2017–2018 | Ofspor | 2 | (0) |
| 2018–2020 | Trabzonspor | 1 | (0) |
| 2019–2020 | → Kastamonuspor (loan) | 24 | (2) |
| 2020–2023 | 1461 Trabzon FK | 68 | (6) |
| 2023 | → Kırklarelispor (loan) | 3 | (0) |
| 2023–2024 | Adıyaman | 23 | (1) |
| 2024– | Beykoz Anadolu | 19 | (1) |
- * Club domestic league appearances and goals as of 30 November 2025

Berkay Sefa Kara (born 27 March 1999) is a Turkish professional footballer who plays as a winger for TFF 2. Lig club Beykoz Anadolu.

== Professional career ==
On 21 July 2018, Kara signed his first professional contract with Trabzonspor, for a duration of 5 years. Kara made his professional debut for Trabzonspor in a 2-0 Süper Lig loss to Alanyaspor on 17 February 2019.

On 18 February it was announced, that Kara alongside four other young players had been promoted to the youth team again.
