= Murat Akpınar =

Azerbaijani footballer (born 1999)

Personal information
- Full name: Murat Cem Akpınar
- Date of birth: 24 January 1999 (age 27)
- Place of birth: Düzköy, Turkey
- Height: 1.70 m (5 ft 7 in)
- Position: Midfielder

Team information
- Current team: Kayserispor
- Number: 6

Youth career
- 2007–2011: Yeni Düzköyspor
- 2011–2018: Trabzonspor

Senior career*
Years	Team	Apps	(Gls)
2018–2024	Trabzonspor	8	(1)
2018	→ 1461 Trabzon (loan)	15	(2)
2019	→ Hekimoğlu Trabzon (loan)	11	(1)
2020–2021	→ Kocaelispor (loan)	32	(3)
2022–2023	→ Giresunspor (loan)	30	(0)
2023–2024	→ Sakaryaspor (loan)	26	(2)
2024–2025	Sakaryaspor	15	(2)
2025	Bandırmaspor	12	(1)
2025–2026	Erzurumspor	17	(2)
2026–	Kayserispor	4	(1)

International career
2015	Azerbaijan U17	13	(2)
- * Club domestic league appearances and goals as of 14 October 2026

Murat Cem Akpınar (born 24 January 1999) is a Turkish professional footballer who plays as a midfielder for TFF 1. Lig club Kayserispor. Born in Turkey, he has represented Azerbaijan at youth level.

== Professional career ==
Akpınar made his professional debut for Trabzonspor in a 3–1 Süper Lig win over Göztepe S.K. on 22 February 2019.

On 13 November 2025, Akpınar was banned from playing for 45 days for his involvement in the 2025 Turkish football betting scandal.

== International career ==
Born in Turkey, Akpınar is of Azerbaijani and Turkish descent. He represented the Azerbaijan U17s in 2015.

== Honours ==
Trabzonspor

- Süper Lig: 2021–22
