= Arda Akbulut =

Turkish footballer (born 2001)

Personal information
- Date of birth: 1 January 2001 (age 25)
- Place of birth: Trabzon, Turkey
- Height: 1.92 m (6 ft 4 in)
- Position: Goalkeeper

Team information
- Current team: Fethiyespor
- Number: 1

Youth career
- 2013–2017: Trabzonspor

Senior career*
Years	Team	Apps	(Gls)
2017–2024	Trabzonspor	3	(0)
2022	→ Bandırmaspor (loan)	0	(0)
2023–2024	→ Adanaspor (loan)	3	(0)
2024	→ 1461 Trabzon (loan)	1	(0)
2024–	Fethiyespor	33	(0)

International career^{‡}
2015	Turkey U14	2	(0)
2016	Turkey U15	5	(0)
2016–2017	Turkey U16	9	(0)
2017–2018	Turkey U17	7	(0)
2019	Turkey U18	1	(0)
2019–2020	Turkey U19	2	(0)
2019	Turkey U20	1	(0)
- * Club domestic league appearances and goals as of 30 November 2025 ‡ National team caps and goals as of 12 October 2020

Arda Akbulut (born 1 January 2001) is a Turkish professional footballer who plays for TFF 2. Lig club Fethiyespor as a goalkeeper.

== Career ==
=== Club ===
On 19 December 2018, Akbulut made his debut for Trabzonspor against Sivas Belediye Spor in 5th round encounter of 2018–19 Turkish Cup where he earned a clean sheet, following the final score of 5–0. On 10 February 2019, Akbulut made his Süper Lig debut at week 21 encounter of 2018-19 season against Galatasaray which ended 3–1 in favour of Galatasaray.

On 12 January 2023, Akbulut moved on a 1.5-year loan to Adanaspor.

== Honours ==
Trabzonspor

- Turkish Cup: 2019–20
- Süper Lig: 2021–22
