= Hüseyin Türkmen =

Turkish footballer (born 1998)

Personal information
- Date of birth: 1 January 1998 (age 28)
- Place of birth: Akçaabat, Turkey
- Height: 1.83 m (6 ft 0 in)
- Position: Centre-back

Youth career
- 2007–2011: Ünyespor
- 2011–2014: 1461 Trabzon
- 2014–2018: Trabzonspor

Senior career*
Years	Team	Apps	(Gls)
2018–2025	Trabzonspor	99	(0)
2025–2026	Antalyaspor	20	(0)

International career^{‡}
2019–2020	Turkey U21	9	(0)
- * Club domestic league appearances and goals as of 10 June 2026 ‡ National team caps and goals as of 27 March 2019

Hüseyin Türkmen (born 1 January 1998) is a Turkish professional footballer who plays as a centre-back for Süper Lig club Antalyaspor.

== Professional career ==
On 30 November 2017, Hüseyin signed his first professional contract with his local club Trabzonspor. Hüseyin made his professional debut for Trabzonspor in a 3-1 Süper Lig win over Bursaspor on 12 May 2018.

== Honours ==
Trabzonspor

- Süper Lig: 2021–22
- Turkish Cup: 2019–20
- Turkish Super Cup: 2020, 2022
