= Dorukhan Toköz =

Turkish footballer

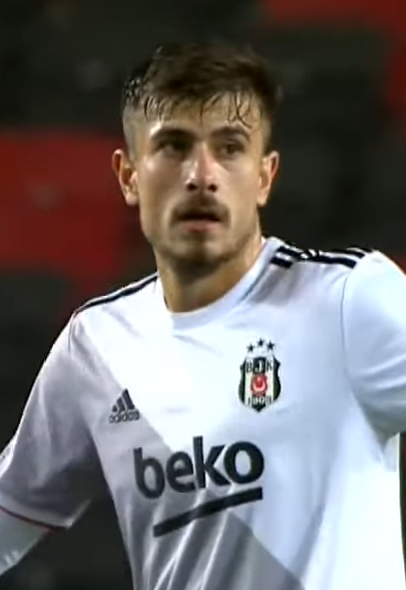
- Toköz playing for Beşiktaş in 2021

Personal information
- Date of birth: 21 May 1996 (age 30)
- Place of birth: Eskişehir, Turkey
- Height: 1.80 m (5 ft 11 in)
- Position: Midfielder

Team information
- Current team: Fatih Karagümrük
- Number: 8

Youth career
- 2006–2015: Eskişehirspor

Senior career*
Years	Team	Apps	(Gls)
2015–2018	Eskişehirspor	60	(3)
2018–2021	Beşiktaş	58	(3)
2021–2023	Trabzonspor	35	(2)
2023–2024	Adana Demirspor	20	(0)
2024–2025	Eyüpspor	18	(0)
2025–2026	Kayserispor	26	(0)
2026–	Fatih Karagümrük	8	(0)

International career^{‡}
2017–2018	Turkey U21	13	(1)
2019–	Turkey	14	(1)
- * Club domestic league appearances and goals as of 19 October 2026 ‡ National team caps and goals as of 07:03, 4 October 2023 (UTC)

Dorukhan Toköz (born 21 May 1996) is a Turkish professional footballer who plays as a midfielder for TFF 1. Lig club Fatih Karagümrük.

== Professional career ==
Toköz is a youth product of Eskişehirspor, and signed his first professional contract with the team in 2015. He made his professional debut for Eskişehirspor in a 2-1 Süper Lig loss to İstanbul Başakşehir F.K. on 20 December 2015. On 26 June 2018, he transferred to Beşiktaş on a 3-year contract. He was the breakthrough player of the league for the 2018–19 Süper Lig season. He helped Beşiktaş win the 2020–21 Süper Lig and 2020–21 Turkish Cup.

On 21 July 2021, Toköz transferred to Trabzonspor on a 3+1 year contract. On his first season, he helped the club win the 2021–22 Süper Lig and 2022 Turkish Super Cup. Hampered by injuries, his contract was terminated with the club on 17 June 2023. On 22 July 2023, he transferred to Adana Demirspor on a three-year contract.

In August 2025 the midfielder moved to Central Anatolian side Kayserispor, signing a two year contract.

== International career ==
Toköz was a youth international player for the Turkey U21s.

Toköz made his debut for the Turkey national football team on 22 March 2019 in a Euro 2020 qualifier against Albania, as a 65th-minute substitute for Emre Belözoğlu.

=== International goals ===
Scores and results list. Turkey's goal tally first.

No.	Date	Venue	Opponent	Score	Result	Competition
1.	11 June 2019	Laugardalsvöllur, Reykjavík, Iceland	Iceland	1–2	1–2	UEFA Euro 2020 qualification

== Honours ==
=== Club ===
Beşiktaş J.K.

- Süper Lig: 2020–21
- Türkiye Kupası: 2020–21

Trabzonspor

- Süper Lig: 2021–22
- Turkish Super Cup: 2022

=== Individual ===
- Süper Lig Breakthrough of the Year: 2018–19
