= 2024–25 Trabzonspor season =

Trabzonspor
2024–25 season
- President: Ertuğrul Doğan
- Manager: Abdullah Avcı (until 31 August); İhsan Derelioğlu (caretaker, 1 September); Şenol Güneş (3 September–10 March); Fatih Tekke (from 11 March)
- Stadium: Papara Park
- Süper Lig: 7th
- Turkish Cup: Runners-up
- UEFA Europa League: Third qualifying round
- UEFA Conference League: Play-off round
- Top goalscorer: League: Simon Banza (19); All: Simon Banza (22)
- Highest home attendance: 36,347 vs Fenerbahçe
- Lowest home attendance: 5,321 vs Kayserispor
- Average home league attendance: 17,210
- Biggest win: Trabzonspor 5–0 Adana Demirspor; Trabzonspor 5–0 Antalyaspor
- Biggest defeat: Rapid Wien 2–0 Trabzonspor; Çaykur Rizespor 3–1 Trabzonspor

The 2024–25 season was the 58th season in the history of Trabzonspor, and the club's 51st consecutive season in the Süper Lig. In addition to the domestic league, the club participated in the Turkish Cup, the UEFA Europa League and the UEFA Conference League.

== Squad ==
Position	Number	Player	Date joined	Further data
GK	1	(Turkey) Uğurcan Çakır	2014	Captain
GK	54	(Turkey) Muhammet Taha Tepe	2020	
DF	4	(Turkey) Hüseyin Türkmen	2017	
DF	24	(Suriname) Stefano Denswil	2022	
DF	18	(Turkey) Eren Elmalı	2022	
DF	3	(Croatia) Borna Barišić	2024	
DF	79	(Portugal) Pedro Malheiro	2024	
DF	15	(Montenegro) Stefan Savić	2024	
DF		(Ukraine) Arseniy Batahov	2024	
DF	20	(Turkey) Serkan Asan	2019	
DF	29	(Turkey) Serdar Saatçı	2024	
DF	77	(Turkey) Arif Boşluk	2022	
MF	8	(North Macedonia) Enis Bardhi	2022	
MF	61	(Turkey) Cihan Çanak	2024	
MF		(Turkey) Umut Güneş	2023	
MF	5	(England) John Lundstram	2024	
MF	6	(France) Batista Mendy	2023	
MF	11	(Turkey) Ozan Tufan	2024	
MF	7	(Bosnia and Herzegovina) Edin Višća	2022	
MF	35	(Turkey) Okay Yokuşlu	2024	
MF	10	(Austria) Muhammed Cham	2024	
FW	19	(Turkey) Umut Bozok	2022	
FW		(Turkey) Enis Destan	2021	
FW	70	(Romania) Denis Drăguș	2024	
FW	9	(Nigeria) Anthony Nwakaeme	2024	
FW	17	(Democratic Republic of the Congo) Simon Banza	2024	

== Transfers ==
=== In ===
Pos.	Player	Transferred from	Fee	Date	Source
DF	(Croatia) Borna Barišić	(Scotland) Rangers	Free	1 July 2024	
MF	(England) John Lundstram	(Scotland) Rangers	Free	1 July 2024	
FW	(Nigeria) Anthony Nwakaeme	(Saudi Arabia) Al-Fayha	Free	1 July 2024	
FW	(Romania) Denis Drăguș	(Belgium) Standard Liège	€1,700,000	1 July 2024	
MF	(Turkey) Ozan Tufan	(England) Hull City	€2,000,000	1 July 2024	
DF	(Portugal) Pedro Malheiro	(Portugal) Boavista	€2,000,000	23 July 2024	
DF	(Montenegro) Stefan Savić	(Spain) Atlético Madrid	Undisclosed	24 July 2024	
MF	(Turkey) Okay Yokuşlu	(England) West Bromwich Albion	€1,650,000	31 July 2024	
DF	(Ukraine) Arseniy Batahov	(Ukraine) Zorya Luhansk	€1,820,000	13 August 2024	
MF	(Austria) Muhammed Cham	(France) Clermont Foot	€4,000,000	29 August 2024	
FW	(Democratic Republic of the Congo) Simon Banza	(Portugal) Braga	Loan (+ €2,000,000)	5 September 2024	
DF	(Turkey) Serdar Saatçı	(Portugal) Braga	€2,500,000	5 September 2024	

=== Out ===
Pos.	Player	Transferred to	Fee	Date	Source
FW	(Nigeria) Paul Onuachu	(England) Southampton	Loan return	30 June 2024	
MF	(Ivory Coast) Nicolas Pépé	(Spain) Villarreal	End of contract	1 July 2024	
DF	(Turkey) Emirhan Zaman	(Turkey) 1461 Trabzon	Undisclosed	5 July 2024	
MF	(Turkey) Hakan Yeşil	(Turkey) Pendikspor	Undisclosed	10 July 2024	
DF	(Belgium) Thomas Meunier	(France) Lille	Contract terminated	16 July 2024	
MF	(Morocco) Montasser Lahtimi	(Kuwait) Kazma	Contract terminated	16 July 2024	
MF	(Greece) Dimitrios Kourbelis	(Saudi Arabia) Al-Khaleej	Contract terminated	17 July 2024	
MF	(Spain) Joaquín Fernández	(United States) Sporting Kansas City	Contract terminated	19 July 2024	
MF	(Turkey) Kerem Şen	(Turkey) İstanbulspor	Loan	1 August 2024	
FW	(Uruguay) Maxi Gómez		Contract terminated	19 August 2024	
MF	(Turkey) Göktan Gürpüz	(Turkey) Fatih Karagümrük	Loan	21 August 2024	
DF	(Turkey) Rayyan Baniya	(Italy) Palermo	Loan	26 August 2024	
FW	(Egypt) Trézéguet	(Qatar) Al-Rayyan	Loan	3 September 2024	
MF	(Croatia) Tonio Teklić	(Turkey) Erzurumspor	Loan	9 September 2024	
MF	(Croatia) Mislav Oršić		Contract terminated	21 December 2024	

== Friendlies ==
=== Pre-season ===
10 July 2024 Friendly	Szeged-Csanád (Hungary)	1–2	(Turkey) Trabzonspor	Hungary
18:30 UTC+2	Borvető 17'	Report	Bozok 83'; Trézéguet 90+2'

13 July 2024 Friendly	Železničar Pančevo (Serbia)	1–3	(Turkey) Trabzonspor	Hungary
18:30 UTC+2	Romanić 73'	Report	Bardhi 43'; Višća 56' (pen.); Destan 76'

== Competitions ==
=== Overall record ===
Competition	First match	Last match	Starting round	Final position	Record							
Competition	First match	Last match	Starting round	Final position	Pld	W	D	L	GF	GA	GD	Win %
Süper Lig	11 August 2024	30 May 2025	Matchday 1	7th place	32	12	10	10	53	40	+13	37.50
Turkish Cup	8 January 2025	14 May 2025	Group stage	Runners-up	5	4	1	0	15	6	+9	80.00
UEFA Europa League	25 July 2024	15 August 2024	Second qualifying round	Third qualifying round	4	2	0	2	3	3	+0	50.00
UEFA Conference League	22 August 2024	29 August 2024	Play-off round	Play-off round	2	0	2	0	1	1	+0	0.00
Total					43	18	13	12	72	50	+22	41.86

Last updated: 5 May 2025
Source: Soccerway

=== Süper Lig ===
==== League table ====
Pos	Team	Pld	W	D	L	GF	GA	GD	Pts	Qualification or relegation
5	Başakşehir	36	16	6	14	60	56	+4	54	Qualification for the Conference League second qualifying round
6	Eyüpspor	36	15	8	13	52	47	+5	53	
7	Trabzonspor	36	13	12	11	58	45	+13	51	
8	Göztepe	36	13	11	12	59	50	+9	50	
9	Rizespor	36	15	4	17	52	58	−6	49	

Source: Süper Lig
Rules for classification: 1) Points; 2) Head-to-head points; 3) Head-to-head goal difference; 4) Head-to-head goals scored; 5) Goal difference; 6) Goals scored; 7) Play-off.
(Note: Head-to-head record is used only after all the matches between the teams in question have been played)

==== Results summary ====
Overall								Home						Away					
Pld	W	D	L	GF	GA	GD	Pts	W	D	L	GF	GA	GD	W	D	L	GF	GA	GD
32	12	10	10	53	40	+13	46	10	4	2	38	18	+20	2	6	8	15	22	−7

Last updated: 5 May 2025.
Source: Süper Lig

==== Results by round ====
Round	1	2	3	4	5	6	7	8	9	10	11	12	13	14	15	16	17	18	19	20	21	22
Ground	A		H	A	H	A	H	A	H	A	H	A	H	A	H	A	H	A	H	H		A
Result	D	B	D	D	D	D	W	D	W	L	L	L	W	L	D	L	W	L	W	W	B	
Position	13	12	14	13	12	14	10	10	8	9	11	13	10	12	13	15	13	14	10	9		

Updated to match(es) played on 20 January 2025. Source: Süper Lig
A = Away; H = Home; W = Win; D = Draw; L = Loss

==== Matches ====
The match schedule was released on 11 July 2024.

11 August 2024 1	Sivasspor	0–0	Trabzonspor	Sivas
19:15 UTC+3	Turgunboev (yellow card) 29'	Report		Stadium: New Sivas 4 Eylül Stadium; Attendance: 7,648; Referee: Cihan Aydın

2	Bye

1 September 2024 4	Eyüpspor	0–0	Trabzonspor	Kasımpaşa
19:15 UTC+3	Yalçın (yellow card) 55'; Kabasakal (yellow card) 69'; Sešlar (yellow card) 79'	Report		Stadium: Recep Tayyip Erdoğan Stadium; Attendance: 3,885; Referee: Atilla Karaoğlan

15 September 2024 5	Trabzonspor	1–1	Beşiktaş	Trabzon
20:00 UTC+3	Višća (red card) 13'; Yokuşlu 17'; Bardhi (yellow card) 45+4'; Çakır (yellow card) 84'	Report	Masuaku (yellow card) 15'; Silva 39'; Al-Musrati (yellow card) 45+4'; Günok (yellow card) 77'	Stadium: Papara Park; Attendance: 35,499; Referee: Ali Şansalan

19 September 2024 3	Trabzonspor	2–2	Kayserispor	Trabzon
20:00 UTC+3	Bozok 89'; Denswil 90+8'	Report	Boa Morte (yellow card) 5', (goal) 63'; Attamah (penalty missed) 10'; Kaldırım 12'; Cardoso (yellow card) 54'; Bourabia (yellow card) 73'; Sazdağı (yellow card) 73' (yellow-red card) 87'; Nazon (yellow card) 88'	Stadium: Papara Park; Attendance: 5,321; Referee: Mehmet Türkmen

23 September 2024 6	Gaziantep	0–0	Trabzonspor	Gaziantep
20:00 UTC+3	Soyalp (yellow card) 36'; Kozłowski (yellow card) 66'; Saborit (yellow card) 68'; Sorescu (yellow card) 84'; Kızıldağ (yellow card) 90+3'	Report	Yokuşlu (yellow card) 34'; Nwakaeme (yellow card) 46'; Malheiro (yellow card) 63'; Banza (yellow card) 90+3'	Stadium: Gaziantep Stadium; Attendance: 4,921; Referee: Volkan Bayarslan

29 September 2024 7	Trabzonspor	3–2	Konyaspor	Trabzon
16:00 UTC+3	Višća 16'; Banza 45+4' (pen.), 54'	Report	Demirbağ 24'; Keyta 89'	Stadium: Papara Park; Attendance: 17,427; Referee: Halil Umut Meler

5 October 2024 8	Hatayspor	1–1	Trabzonspor	Mersin
19:00 UTC+3	Sağlam 14', (yellow card) 45'; Çörekçi (yellow card) 70'; Bamgboye (yellow card) 71'; Yılmaz (yellow card) 90+2'	Report	Banza 48', (yellow card) 90+1'; Lundstram (yellow card) 50'; Saatçı (yellow card) 53'; Elmalı (yellow card) 90+2'; Drăguș (yellow card) 90+4'; Yılmaz (yellow card) 90+6'	Stadium: Mersin Stadium; Attendance: 5,926; Referee: Kadir Sağlam

19 October 2024 9	Trabzonspor	1–0	İstanbul Başakşehir	Trabzon
16:00 UTC+3	Višća 90+1'	Report	Ba (yellow card) 39'; Kemen (yellow card) 56'; Crespo (yellow card) 73'; Opoku (yellow card) 90+6'	Stadium: Papara Park; Attendance: 14,208; Referee: Zorbay Küçük

26 October 2024 10	Göztepe	2–1	Trabzonspor	İzmir
19:00 UTC+3	Dennis (red card) 28'; Solet 60', (yellow card) 85'; Tijanić 90+2'	Report	Yokuşlu (yellow card) 41'; Malheiro (yellow card) 45+5'; Mendy (yellow card) 57'; Banza 64' (pen.)	Stadium: Gürsel Aksel Stadium; Attendance: 16,733; Referee: Cihan Aydın

3 November 2024 11	Trabzonspor	2–3	Fenerbahçe	Trabzon
19:00 UTC+3	Tufan (yellow card) 30'; Denswil (yellow card) 45+3'; Banza 59' (pen.), 67' (pen.), (yellow card) 90+15'; Elmalı (yellow card) 62'; Çakır (yellow card) 75'; Destan (yellow card) 90+10'; Bozok (yellow card) 90+10'	Report	Fred 42'; Osayi-Samuel (yellow card) 59'; Džeko 75'; Amrabat (yellow card) 90+3', (goal) 90+12'	Stadium: Papara Park; Attendance: 36,347; Referee: Oğuzhan Çakır

9 November 2024 12	Çaykur Rizespor	3–1	Trabzonspor	Rize
19:00 UTC+3	Varešanović (yellow card) 44'; Hadžiahmetović 45+10'; Mocsi (yellow card) 45+10'; David 71'; Olawoyin 81'	Report	Višća 23'; Destan (yellow card) 45'; Yokuşlu (yellow card) 84'; Malheiro (yellow card) 86'	Stadium: Rize City Stadium; Attendance: 7,618; Referee: Zorbay Küçük

25 November 2024 13	Trabzonspor	5–0	Adana Demirspor	Trabzon
20:00 UTC+3	Cham 3', 78', 84'; Türkmen (yellow card) 22'; Banza 50', 54'	Report	Maestro (yellow card) 30'; Karakuş (yellow card) 80'	Stadium: Papara Park; Attendance: 7,763; Referee: Mehmet Türkmen

30 November 2024 14	Alanyaspor	2–1	Trabzonspor	Alanya
19:00 UTC+3	Özdemir (yellow card) 11' (yellow-red card) 69'; Nuno Lima (yellow card) 33'; Hadergjonaj 44' (pen.); Taşkıran (yellow card) 45'; Augusto 50'; Richard (yellow card) 82'	Report	Drăguș 8'; Mendy (yellow card) 37'; Lundstram (yellow card) 87'; Çakır (yellow card) 90+8'	Stadium: Gain Park Stadium; Attendance: 4,231; Referee: Burak Pakkan

6 December 2024 15	Trabzonspor	2–2	Kasımpaşa	Trabzon
20:00 UTC+3	Cham (yellow card) 45+4'; Saatçı (yellow card) 53'; Banza 79' (pen.); Nwakaeme 81'	Report	Opoku (yellow card) 23'; Da Costa (yellow card) 24', (goal) 90+1'; Cafú 38' (pen.); Rodrigues (yellow card) 76'; Ben Ouanes (yellow card) 90+4'	Stadium: Papara Park; Attendance: 11,612; Referee: Zorbay Küçük

16 December 2024 16	Galatasaray	4–3	Trabzonspor	Sarıyer
21:00 UTC+3	Mertens 8'; Akgün 29'; Jelert (yellow card) 55'; Batshuayi 63' (pen.); Sallai (yellow card) 65'; B. Yılmaz (yellow card) 76'; A. Yılmaz 90+8' (o.g.)	Report	Tufan 17', 55', (yellow card) 22'; Saatçı (yellow card) 15'; Banza 51'; Mendy (yellow card) 90+4'	Stadium: Rams Park; Attendance: 45,739; Referee: Kadir Sağlam

22 December 2024 17	Trabzonspor	1–0	Bodrum	Trabzon
19:00 UTC+3	Yılmaz (yellow card) 17'; Nwakaeme (yellow card) 80'; Malheiro 86', (yellow card) 87'; Mendy (yellow card) 90+3'	Report	Sousa (yellow card) 52'; Bayrakdar (yellow card) 90+2'	Stadium: Papara Park; Attendance: 23,866; Referee: Ozan Ergün

4 January 2025 18	Samsunspor	2–1	Trabzonspor	Samsun
20:00 UTC+3	Holse 30', 75'; Kılınç (yellow card) 38'	Report	Tufan (yellow card) 22'; Banza 49'	Stadium: Samsun 19 Mayıs Stadium; Attendance: 25,165; Referee: Mehmet Türkmen

12 January 2025 19	Trabzonspor	5–0	Antalyaspor	Trabzon
16:00 UTC+3	Cham (yellow card) 37', (goal) 70'; Banza 21'; Malheiro 52', 64', 87'	Report		Stadium: Papara Park; Attendance: 15,278; Referee: Cihan Aydın

20 January 2025 20	Trabzonspor	4–0	Sivasspor	Trabzon
20:00 UTC+3	Batahov 6'; Banza 13', (penalty missed) 49'; Tufan 31'; Lundstram 86'	Report	Radaković (yellow card) 4'; Koita (yellow card) 29'	Stadium: Papara Park; Referee: Zorbay Küçük

21	Bye

1 February 2025 22	Kayserispor	0–0	Trabzonspor	Kayseri
16:00 UTC+3				Stadium: Kadir Has Stadium

10 February 2025 23	Trabzonspor	1–0	Eyüpspor	Trabzon

15 February 2025 24	Beşiktaş	2–1	Trabzonspor	Beşiktaş

23 February 2025 25	Trabzonspor	3–2	Gaziantep	Trabzon

3 March 2025 26	Konyaspor	1–0	Trabzonspor	Konya

8 March 2025 27	Trabzonspor	1–2	Hatayspor	Trabzon

15 March 2025 28	İstanbul Başakşehir	0–3	Trabzonspor	Başakşehir

29 March 2025 29	Trabzonspor	1–1	Göztepe	Trabzon

6 April 2025 30	Fenerbahce	4–1	Trabzonspor	Kadıköy

13 April 2025 31	Trabzonspor	2–0	Rizespor	Trabzon

19 April 2025 32	Adana Demirspor	0–1	Trabzonspor	Adana

27 April 2025 33	Trabzonspor	4–3	Alanyaspor	Trabzon

5 May 2025 34	Kasımpaşa	1–1	Trabzonspor	Kasımpaşa
20:00				Stadium: Recep Tayyip Erdoğan Stadium

10 May 2025 35	Trabzonspor	0–2	Galatasaray	Trabzon
19:00

=== Turkish Cup ===
==== Group stage ====
Pos	Team	Pld	W	D	L	GF	GA	GD	Pts
1	Trabzonspor	3	2	1	0	10	4	+6	7
2	İskenderunspor	3	1	2	0	5	4	+1	5
3	Alanyaspor	3	1	1	1	5	5	0	4
4	Çaykur Rizespor	3	1	0	2	4	7	−3	3
5	Fatih Karagümrük	3	1	0	2	3	6	−3	3
6	MKE Ankaragücü	3	0	2	1	3	4	−1	2

8 January 2025 1	Trabzonspor	3–0	Alanyaspor	Trabzon
18:00 UTC+3	Cham (yellow card) 7'; Güneş (yellow card) 8'; Višća 51'; Banza 58'; Malheiro (yellow card) 65'; Nwakaeme 69'	Report	Lima (yellow card) 36'; Augusto (yellow card) 49'; Aliti (yellow card) 56'	Stadium: Papara Park; Referee: Atilla Karaoğlan

5 February 2025 2	İskenderunspor	2–2	Trabzonspor

26 February 2025 3	Trabzonspor	5–2	Çaykur Rizespor	Trabzon
				Stadium: Papara Park

=== UEFA Europa League ===
==== Second qualifying round ====
The draw was held on 19 June 2024.

25 July 2024 First leg	Ružomberok (Slovakia)	0–2	(Turkey) Trabzonspor	Ružomberok, Slovakia
18:30 UTC+2	Gomola (yellow card) 51'	Report	Trézéguet 39'; Elmalı (yellow card) 86'; Çanak 90+1'	Stadium: Štadión pod Čebraťom; Attendance: 4,544; Referee: Bastian Dankert (Germany)

1 August 2024 Second leg	Trabzonspor (Turkey)	1–0 (3–0 agg.)	(Slovakia) Ružomberok	Trabzon
20:30 UTC+3	Drăguș 65'	Report		Stadium: Papara Park; Attendance: 22,563; Referee: Nenad Minaković (Serbia)

==== Third qualifying round ====
8 August 2024 First leg	Trabzonspor (Turkey)	0–1	(Austria) Rapid Wien	Trabzon
20:00 UTC+3	Elmalı (yellow card) 48'		Grgić 67'	Stadium: Papara Park; Attendance: 33,476; Referee: Kristo Tohver (Estonia)

15 August 2024 Second leg	Rapid Wien (Austria)	2–0 (3–0 agg.)	(Turkey) Trabzonspor	Vienna, Austria
18:00 UTC+2	Sangare (yellow card) 14'; Jansson (yellow card) 59'; Seidl 77'; Lang 87'		Elmalı (yellow card) 16'; Mendy (yellow card) 43'; Çanak (yellow card) 59'; Çakır (yellow card) 71'; Malheiro (red card) 85'; Denswil (yellow card) 85'	Stadium: Allianz Stadion; Attendance: 22,500; Referee: Manfredas Lukjančukas (Lithuania)

=== UEFA Conference League ===
==== Play-off round ====
22 August 2024 First leg	St. Gallen (Switzerland)	0–0	(Turkey) Trabzonspor	St. Gallen, Switzerland
21:00 UTC+2	Ruiz (yellow card) 80'; Geubbels (yellow card) 88'; Görtler (yellow card) 90+1'	Report	Yokuşlu (yellow card) 25'; Barišić (yellow card) 81'	Stadium: Kybunpark; Attendance: 16,291; Referee: Miguel Nogueira (Portugal)

29 August 2024 Second leg	Trabzonspor (Turkey)	1–1 (a.e.t.) (1–1 agg.) (4–5 p)	(Switzerland) St. Gallen	Trabzon
20:00 UTC+3	Destan 52'	Report	Schmidt 31'; Görtler (yellow card) 65'; Ati-Zigi (yellow card) 83'; Yannick (yellow card) 89'; Ambrosius (yellow card) 109'	Stadium: Papara Park; Attendance: 26,064; Referee: Andris Treimanis (Latvia)
	Penalties
	Denswil (penalty scored); Trézéguet (penalty scored); Barišić (penalty scored); Drăguș (penalty scored); Savić (penalty missed)		(penalty scored) Milošević; (penalty scored) Vallçi; (penalty scored) Cissé; (penalty scored) Toma; (penalty scored) Ambrosius

== Statistics ==
=== Goalscorers ===
Rank	Pos.	Player	Süper Lig	Turkish Cup	Europa League	Conference League	Total
1	FW	(Democratic Republic of the Congo) Simon Banza	13	1	0	0	14
2	MF	(Austria) Muhammed Cham	4	0	0	0	4
2	DF	(Portugal) Pedro Malheiro	4	0	0	0	4
2	MF	(Bosnia and Herzegovina) Edin Višća	3	1	0	0	4
5	MF	(Turkey) Ozan Tufan	3	0	0	0	3
6	FW	(Romania) Denis Drăguș	1	0	1	0	2
6	FW	(Nigeria) Anthony Nwakaeme	1	1	0	0	2
8	DF	(Ukraine) Arseniy Batahov	1	0	0	0	1
8	FW	(Turkey) Umut Bozok	1	0	0	0	1
8	MF	(Turkey) Cihan Çanak	0	0	1	0	1
8	DF	(Suriname) Stefano Denswil	1	0	0	0	1
8	FW	(Turkey) Enis Destan	0	0	0	1	1
8	MF	(England) John Lundstram	1	0	0	0	1
8	FW	(Egypt) Trézéguet	0	0	1	0	1
8	MF	(Turkey) Okay Yokuşlu	1	0	0	0	1
Totals			34	3	3	1	41
