= 2022–23 Trabzonspor season =

Trabzonspor
2022–23 season
- President: Ahmet Ağaoğlu (until 3 March 2023); Ertuğrul Doğan (from 26 March 2023)
- Head coach: Abdullah Avcı (until 7 March 2023); Orhan Ak (from 29 March 2023 to 4 April 2023); Nenad Bjelica (from 18 April 2023)
- Stadium: Şenol Güneş Sports Complex
- Süper Lig: 6th
- Turkish Cup: Quarter-finals
- Turkish Super Cup: Winners
- UEFA Champions League: Play-off round
- UEFA Europa League: Group stage
- UEFA Europa Conference League: Knockout round play-offs
- Top goalscorer: League: Trézéguet (11); All: Anastasios Bakasetas; Trézéguet (13 each)
| Home colours | Away colours | Third colours |

The 2022–23 season was the 55th season in the existence of Trabzonspor, all coming in the top flight of Turkish football. In addition to the domestic league, Trabzonspor participated in this season's editions of the Turkish Cup, the Turkish Super Cup, the UEFA Champions League, the UEFA Europa League and the UEFA Europa Conference League.

== Players ==
=== Current squad ===
As of 6 June 2023

Note: Flags indicate national team as defined under FIFA eligibility rules; some limited exceptions apply. Players may hold more than one non-FIFA nationality.

| No. | Pos. | Nation | Player |
|---|---|---|---|
| 1 | GK | TUR | Uğurcan Çakır (captain) |
| 3 | DF | ESP | Marc Bartra |
| 4 | DF | TUR | Hüseyin Türkmen |
| 6 | MF | GRE | Manolis Siopis |
| 7 | MF | BIH | Edin Višća |
| 8 | MF | TUR | Dorukhan Toköz |
| 9 | FW | TUR | Umut Bozok |
| 10 | MF | TUR | Abdülkadir Ömür |
| 11 | FW | GRE | Anastasios Bakasetas |
| 17 | MF | SVK | Marek Hamšík |
| 18 | DF | TUR | Eren Elmalı |
| 19 | DF | DEN | Jens Stryger Larsen |
| 20 | MF | TUR | Süleyman Cebeci |
| 22 | DF | TUR | Taha Altıkardeş |
| 24 | DF | NED | Stefano Denswil |
| 25 | MF | CIV | Jean-Philippe Gbamin (on loan from Everton) |
| 27 | FW | EGY | Trézéguet |

| No. | Pos. | Nation | Player |
|---|---|---|---|
| 29 | MF | MKD | Enis Bardhi |
| 30 | FW | URU | Maxi Gómez |
| 34 | MF | TUR | Doğucan Haspolat |
| 50 | MF | SRB | Lazar Marković (on loan from Gaziantep) |
| 54 | GK | TUR | Muhammet Taha Tepe |
| 56 | MF | TUR | Salih Malkoçoğlu |
| 60 | DF | TUR | Oğuzhan Yılmaz |
| 61 | MF | TUR | Yusuf Yazıcı (on loan from Lille) |
| 63 | FW | TUR | Poyraz Yıldırım |
| 72 | DF | TUR | Arif Boşluk |
| 80 | MF | MAR | Montasser Lahtimi |
| 88 | MF | TUR | Emirhan Zaman |
| 96 | GK | TUR | Hakan Aydın |
| 98 | GK | TUR | Kağan Moradaoğlu |
| 99 | DF | TUR | Serkan Asan |
| — | MF | TUR | Abdulkadir Parmak |

=== Out on loan ===
Note: Flags indicate national team as defined under FIFA eligibility rules; some limited exceptions apply. Players may hold more than one non-FIFA nationality.

| No. | Pos. | Nation | Player |
|---|---|---|---|
| 12 | MF | TUR | Hakan Yeşil (at Adanaspor until 30 June 2023) |
| 19 | FW | GUI | Bengali-Fodé Koita (at Kasımpaşa until 30 June 2023) |
| 19 | MF | TUR | Safa Kınalı (at Altınordu until 30 June 2023) |
| 24 | MF | BRA | Flávio (at Al-Taawoun until 30 June 2023) |
| 41 | MF | AZE | Murat Akpınar (at Giresunspor until 30 June 2023) |
| 51 | MF | TUR | Behlül Aydın (at Şanlıurfaspor until 30 June 2023) |

| No. | Pos. | Nation | Player |
|---|---|---|---|
| 59 | GK | TUR | Arda Akbulut (at Adanaspor until 30 June 2024) |
| 77 | MF | TUR | Kerem Baykuş (at Hekimoğlu Trabzon until 30 June 2023) |
| 90 | FW | TUR | Batuhan Kör (at Manisa until 30 June 2023) |
| 94 | FW | TUR | Enis Destan (at Warta Poznań until 30 June 2023) |
| — | DF | TUR | Ahmet Baha Bilgin (at 52 Orduspor until 30 June 2023) |

== Transfers ==
=== In ===
| Date | Position | Nationality | Name | From | Fee | Ref. |
|---|---|---|---|---|---|---|
| 16 June 2022 | DF | (Netherlands) | Stefano Denswil | (Italy) Bologna | Free | |
| 17 June 2022 | DF | (Turkey) | Eren Elmalı | (Turkey) Kasımpaşa | €3.6m | |
| 17 June 2022 | MF | (Turkey) | Doğucan Haspolat | (Turkey) Kasımpaşa | €1.2m | |
| 17 June 2022 | DF | (Denmark) | Jens Stryger Larsen | (Italy) Udinese | Free | |
| 4 July 2022 | FW | (Egypt) | Trézéguet | (England) Aston Villa | €4m | |
| 12 August 2022 | MF | (North Macedonia) | Enis Bardhi | (Spain) Levante | €3m | |
| 14 August 2022 | DF | (Spain) | Marc Bartra | (Spain) Real Betis | €1.2m | |
| 18 August 2022 | MF | (Morocco) | Montasser Lahtimi | (Morocco) FUS Rabat | €600k | |
| 26 August 2022 | MF | (Ivory Coast) | Jean-Philippe Gbamin | (England) Everton (loan) | Free | |
| 30 August 2022 | FW | (Netherlands) | Naci Ünüvar | (Netherlands) Ajax (loan) | €150k | |
| 1 September 2022 | FW | (Turkey) | Umut Bozok | (France) Lorient | €2m | |
| 1 September 2022 | FW | (Uruguay) | Maxi Gómez | (Spain) Valencia | €3m | |
| 5 September 2022 | MF | (Turkey) | Yusuf Yazıcı | (France) Lille (loan) | €500k | |

=== Out ===
| Date | Position | Nationality | Name | To | Fee | Ref. |
|---|---|---|---|---|---|---|
| 1 June 2022 | DF | (Turkey) | Abdurrahim Dursun | (Turkey) Adana Demirspor | Free | |
| 28 June 2022 | MF | (Azerbaijan) | Murat Akpınar | (Turkey) Giresunspor (loan) | Free | |
| 1 July 2022 | GK | (Turkey) | Arda Akbulut | (Turkey) Bandırmaspor (loan) | Free | |
| 4 July 2022 | MF | (Turkey) | Safa Kınalı | (Turkey) Altınordu (loan) | Free | |
| 6 July 2022 | DF | (Turkey) | Ahmet Baha Bilgin | (Turkey) 52 Orduspor (loan) | Free | |
| 7 July 2022 | FW | (Mali) | Fousseni Diabaté | (Serbia) Partizan | Free | |
| 7 July 2022 | FW | (Turkey) | Salih Kavrazlı | (Turkey) Adana Demirspor | Free | |
| 13 July 2022 | MF | (Turkey) | Kerem Baykuş | (Turkey) 1461 Trabzon (loan) | Free | |
| 13 July 2022 | FW | (Turkey) | Koray Kılınç | (Turkey) Bodrumspor | Free | |
| 16 July 2022 | FW | (Ivory Coast) | Gervinho | (Greece) Aris | Free | |
| 20 July 2022 | GK | (Turkey) | Erce Kardeşler | (Turkey) Hatayspor | €400k | |
| 22 July 2022 | MF | (Turkey) | Behlül Aydın | (Turkey) Şanlıurfaspor (loan) | Free | |
| 22 July 2022 | MF | (Brazil) | Flávio | (Saudi Arabia) Al-Taawoun (loan) | $200k | |
| 27 July 2022 | MF | (Turkey) | Abdulkadir Parmak | (Turkey) Gaziantep (loan) | Free | |
| 27 July 2022 | MF | (Turkey) | Yunus Mallı | (Turkey) Kasımpaşa | Free | |
| 28 July 2022 | FW | (Turkey) | Batuhan Kör | (Turkey) Manisa (loan) | Free | |
| 5 August 2022 | FW | (Turkey) | Enis Destan | (Poland) Warta Poznań (loan) | €75k | |
| 6 August 2022 | DF | (Turkey) | Atakan Gündüz | (Turkey) Kırklarelispor | Free | |
| 9 August 2022 | MF | (Turkey) | Berat Özdemir | (Saudi Arabia) Al-Ettifaq | $2.5m | |
| 16 August 2022 | DF | (Turkey) | İsmail Köybaşı | (Turkey) Göztepe | Free | |
| 19 August 2022 | DF | (Turkey) | Ahmetcan Kaplan | (Netherlands) Ajax | €9.5m | |
| 26 August 2022 | MF | (Turkey) | Hakan Yeşil | (Turkey) Adanaspor (loan) | Free | |
| 31 August 2022 | FW | (Denmark) | Andreas Cornelius | (Denmark) Copenhagen | €6m | |
| 2 September 2022 | FW | (Turkey) | Muhammet Akpınar | (Turkey) Serik Belediyespor | Free | |
| 6 September 2022 | MF | (Turkey) | Taha Tunç | (Turkey) 1984 Muşspor | Free | |
| 7 September 2022 | FW | (Ivory Coast) | Jean Evrard Kouassi | (Turkey) Karagümrük (loan) | €700k+ | |
| 8 September 2022 | FW | (Turkey) | Rahmi Anıl Başaran | (Turkey) Bayrampaşa | Free | |
| 8 September 2022 | DF | (Turkey) | Faruk Can Genç | (Turkey) Giresunspor | Free | |
| 8 September 2022 | FW | (Guinea) | Bengali-Fodé Koita | (Turkey) Kasımpaşa (loan) | Free | |
| 26 September 2022 | MF | (Norway) | Anders Trondsen | Released | — | |

== Pre-season and friendlies ==
Win Draw Loss Fixtures

| 14 July 2022 Friendly | Trabzonspor (Turkey) | 2–1 | (Hungary) MTK Budapest | Predoslje, Slovenia |
| 18:00 | Hugo 25'; Altıkardeş (yellow card) 37'; Erdoğan 50' | | Bognár (penalty missed) 38'; Bognár 38'; Kata (yellow card) 42'; Lehoczky (yellow card) 51' | Stadium: National Football Center Brdo |

| 16 July 2022 Friendly | Trabzonspor (Turkey) | 2–2 | (Czech Republic) Slovácko | Predoslje, Slovenia |
| 18:00 | Kouassi 43', 65' | | Trávník 17'; Holzer 27' | Stadium: National Football Center Brdo |

| 23 July 2022 Friendly | Trabzonspor (Turkey) | 0–3 | (Italy) Torino | Kitzbühel, Slovenia |
| 18:00 | | | Radonjić 20', 22'; Seck 27' | Stadium: Sportstadion Langau |

| 25 July 2022 Friendly | Trabzonspor (Turkey) | 0–1 | (Italy) Empoli | Kitzbühel, Slovenia |
| 18:00 | | | Destro 14' | Stadium: Sportstadion Langau |

| 3 December 2022 Friendly | Trabzonspor (Turkey) | 1–1 | (England) Hull City | Antalya, Turkey |
| 16:00 | Trézéguet 4' | | Tufan 72' (pen.) | Stadium: Regnum Carya Hotel Stadium |

| 7 December 2022 Friendly | Trabzonspor (Turkey) | 2–2 | (England) Crystal Palace | Antalya, Turkey |
| 19:00 | Trézéguet 3'; Bozok 23' | | Édouard 7'; Mateta 63' | Stadium: Regnum Carya Hotel Stadium |

| 10 December 2022 Friendly | Trabzonspor (Turkey) | 1–1 | (Turkey) Kasımpaşa | İzmit, Turkey |
| 18:00 | Bozok 16' | | Hadergjonaj 82' (pen.) | Stadium: Kocaeli Stadium |

== Competitions ==
=== Overall record ===
| Competition | First match | Last match | Starting round | Final position | Record | | | | | | | |
| Competition | First match | Last match | Starting round | Final position | Pld | W | D | L | GF | GA | GD | Win % |
|---|---|---|---|---|---|---|---|---|---|---|---|---|
| Süper Lig | 5 August 2022 | 6 June 2023 | Matchday 1 | 6th | 36 | 17 | 6 | 13 | 64 | 54 | +10 | 47.22 |
| Turkish Cup | 21 December 2022 | 4 April 2023 | Fifth round | Quarter-fınals | 3 | 2 | 0 | 1 | 8 | 4 | +4 | 66.67 |
| UEFA Champions League | 16 August 2022 | 24 August 2022 | Play-off round | Play-off round | 2 | 0 | 1 | 1 | 1 | 2 | −1 | 0.00 |
| UEFA Europa League | 8 September 2022 | 3 November 2022 | Group stage | Group stage | 6 | 3 | 0 | 3 | 11 | 9 | +2 | 50.00 |
| UEFA Europa Conference League | 16 February 2023 | 23 February 2023 | Knockout phase play-offs | Knockout phase play-offs | 2 | 1 | 0 | 1 | 1 | 2 | −1 | 50.00 |
| Turkish Super Cup | 30 July 2022 | | Final | Winners | 1 | 1 | 0 | 0 | 4 | 0 | +4 | 100.00 |
| Total | | | | | 50 | 24 | 7 | 19 | 89 | 71 | +18 | 48.00 |

Last updated: 6 June 2023
Source: Soccerway

=== Süper Lig ===
==== League table ====
| Pos | Team | Pld | W | D | L | GF | GA | GD | Pts | Qualification or relegation |
|---|---|---|---|---|---|---|---|---|---|---|
| 4 | Adana Demirspor | 36 | 20 | 9 | 7 | 76 | 45 | +31 | 69 | Qualification for the Europa Conference League second qualifying round |
| 5 | Başakşehir | 36 | 18 | 8 | 10 | 54 | 37 | +17 | 62 | |
| 6 | Trabzonspor | 36 | 17 | 6 | 13 | 64 | 54 | +10 | 57 | |
| 7 | Fatih Karagümrük | 36 | 13 | 12 | 11 | 75 | 63 | +12 | 51 | |
| 8 | Konyaspor | 36 | 12 | 15 | 9 | 49 | 41 | +8 | 51 | |

Source: Süper Lig
Rules for classification: 1) Points; 2) Head-to-head points; 3) Head-to-head goal difference; 4) Head-to-head goals scored; 5) Goal difference; 6) Goals scored; 7) Play-off.

==== Results summary ====
| Overall | | | | | | | | Home | | | | | | Away | | | | | |
| Pld | W | D | L | GF | GA | GD | Pts | W | D | L | GF | GA | GD | W | D | L | GF | GA | GD |
|---|---|---|---|---|---|---|---|---|---|---|---|---|---|---|---|---|---|---|---|
| 36 | 17 | 6 | 13 | 64 | 54 | +10 | 57 | 12 | 4 | 2 | 38 | 13 | +25 | 5 | 2 | 11 | 26 | 41 | −15 |

Source: Soccerway

==== Results by matchday ====
| Round | 1 | 2 | 3 | 4 | 5 | 6 | 7 | 8 | 9 | 10 | 11 | 12 | 13 | 14 | 15 | 16 | 17 | 18 | 19 | 20 | 21 | 22 | 23 | 24 | 25 | 26 | 27 | 28 | 29 | 30 | 31 | 32 | 33 | 34 | 35 | 36 | 37 | 38 |
|---|---|---|---|---|---|---|---|---|---|---|---|---|---|---|---|---|---|---|---|---|---|---|---|---|---|---|---|---|---|---|---|---|---|---|---|---|---|---|
| Ground | A | H | A | H | A | A | H | A | H | A | H | B | H | A | H | A | H | A | H | H | A | H | A | H | H | A | H | A | H | A | B | A | H | A | H | A | H | A |
| Result | W | W | L | D | W | L | W | W | D | D | W | X | D | D | W | L | W | L | W | W | L | W | L | L | W | W | L | L | D | L | X | L | W | L | W | W | W | L |
| Position | 3 | 2 | 9 | 8 | 8 | 8 | 7 | 5 | 7 | 6 | 3 | 6 | 7 | 7 | 5 | 6 | 5 | 6 | 6 | 5 | 6 | 6 | 6 | 6 | 5 | 5 | 5 | 6 | 6 | 6 | 6 | 8 | 7 | 8 | 6 | 6 | 6 | 6 |

Source: Soccerway
A = Away; H = Home; B = Bye; W = Win; D = Draw; L = Loss; X = Bye

==== Matches ====
| 5 August 2022 1 | İstanbulspor | 0–2 | Trabzonspor | Istanbul |
| 21:00 TRT (UTC+3) | Yazgan (yellow card) 45'; Aksu (yellow card) 82' | Report | Cornelius 16'; Trézéguet (yellow card) 49'; Siopis (yellow card) 74'; Denswil 86' | Stadium: Atatürk Olympic Stadium; Attendance: 7,126; Referee: Arda Kardeşler; Assistant referees: Ali Saygın Ögel, Hakan Yemişken; Fourth official: Sarper Barış Saka |

| 12 August 2022 2 | Trabzonspor | 1–0 | Hatayspor | Trabzon |
| 21:00 TRT (UTC+3) | Ömür 71'; Bakasetas (yellow card) 90' | Report | Ribeiro (yellow card) 11'; Çağıran (yellow card) 45'; Kamara (yellow card) 90+1' | Stadium: Şenol Güneş Sports Complex; Attendance: 29,789; Referee: Abdulkadir Bitigen; Assistant referees: Serkan Ok, Alpaslan Dedeş; Fourth official: Caner Ak |

| 20 August 2022 3 | Antalyaspor | 5–2 | Trabzonspor | Antalya |
| 21:45 TRT (UTC+3) | Fernando 14'; Larsson (yellow card) 17'; Wright 40' (pen.), 90+8'; Bayrakdar 81', 90+6' | Report | Haspolat (yellow card) 32'; Bardhi 45+5', 73'; Denswil (yellow card) 60' | Stadium: Antalya Stadium; Attendance: 14,285; Referee: Volkan Bayarslan; Assistant referees: Erdinç Sezertam, Mustafa Sönmez; Fourth official: Mustafa Kürşad Filiz |

| 28 August 2022 4 | Trabzonspor | 0–0 | Galatasaray | Trabzon |
| 21:45 TRT (UTC+3) | Trézéguet (yellow card) 21'; Toköz (yellow card) 46'; Elmalı (yellow card) 63' | Report | Akgün (yellow card) 15'; Aktürkoğlu (yellow card) 45+4' | Stadium: Şenol Güneş Sports Complex; Attendance: 34,803; Referee: Ali Palabıyık; Assistant referees: Ceyhun Sesigüzel, Kemal Yılmaz; Fourth official: Burak Şeker |

| 2 September 2022 5 | Ümraniyespor | 0–1 | Trabzonspor | Istanbul |
| 21:00 TRT (UTC+3) | | Report | Gbamin (yellow card) 27'; Bartra (yellow card) 35'; Elmalı (yellow card) 53'; Trézéguet 60' | Stadium: Recep Tayyip Erdoğan Stadium; Attendance: 5,531; Referee: Arda Kardeşler; Assistant referees: Aleks Taşçıoğlu, Kamil Çetin; Fourth official: Mert Güzenge |

| 12 September 2022 6 | Adana Demirspor | 3–2 | Trabzonspor | Adana |
| 21:30 TRT (UTC+3) | Güler (yellow card) 1'; Rodrigues 10'; Rakitskyi (yellow card) 35'; Ndiaye 55'; Sari (yellow card) 62'; Akaydın (yellow card) 87', (goal) 90+4' | Report | Gbamin (yellow card) 4'; Bakasetas 36' (pen.); Bartra (yellow card) 45'; Bardhi (yellow card) 45+6'; Bozok 84'; Hugo (yellow card) 85' | Stadium: New Adana Stadium; Attendance: 24,960; Referee: Atilla Karaoğlan; Assistant referees: Serkan Olguncan, Serkan Çimen; Fourth official: Suat Arslanboğa |

| 18 September 2022 7 | Trabzonspor | 3–2 | Gaziantep | Trabzon |
| 17:00 TRT (UTC+3) | Trézéguet 14'; Bakasetas 42' (pen.); Bartra (yellow card) 83', (goal) 90+8'; Çakır (yellow card) 90+10' | Report | Maxim 2'; Marković 10'; Pehlivan (yellow card) 77'; Güvenç (yellow card) 90+10'; Ersoy (yellow card) 90+11' | Stadium: Şenol Güneş Sports Complex; Attendance: 22,062; Referee: Mete Kalkavan; Assistant referees: Mustafa Emre Eyisoy, Mustafa Savranlar; Fourth official: Ali Şansalan |

| 1 October 2022 8 | Kayserispor | 1–2 | Trabzonspor | Kayseri |
| 17:00 TRT (UTC+3) | Gavranović 24', (yellow card) 55'; Bulut (yellow card) 77'; Kemen (yellow card) 86'; Kolovetsios (yellow card) 90+4' | Report | Trézéguet (yellow card) 14'; Bakasetas 78' (pen.); Bozok 83'; Elmalı (yellow card) 90+1'; Gómez (yellow card) 90+2' | Stadium: Kadir Has Stadium; Attendance: 10,448; Referee: Ümit Öztürk; Assistant referees: Kemal Yılmaz, Ata Yıldırım; Fourth official: Burak Şeker |

| 10 October 2022 9 | Trabzonspor | 0–0 | Kasımpaşa | Trabzon |
| 20:00 TRT (UTC+3) | Bakasetas (yellow card) 51' | Report | Tırpan (yellow card) 53'; Eysseric (yellow card) 67'; Çiftpınar (yellow card) 90+4' | Stadium: Şenol Güneş Sports Complex; Attendance: 25,455; Referee: Hüseyin Göçek; Assistant referees: Ekrem Kan, Erdem Bayık; Fourth official: Melis Özçiğdem |

| 16 October 2022 10 | Beşiktaş | 2–2 | Trabzonspor | Istanbul |
| 20:00 TRT (UTC+3) | Larsen 29' (o.g.); Tosun 70', (yellow card) 90+5'; Rosier (yellow card) 90+2'; Ghezzal (yellow card) 90+6' | Report | Gómez 11'; Bakasetas (yellow card) 32'; Trézéguet 36'; Bardhi (yellow card) 90+2'; Yazıcı (red card) 90+7'; Çakır (yellow card) 90+7' | Stadium: Vodafone Park; Attendance: 35,518; Referee: Ali Şansalan; Assistant referees: Cevdet Kömürcüoğlu, Süleyman Özay; Fourth official: Mustafa Kürşad Filiz |

| 22 October 2022 11 | Trabzonspor | 1–0 | Sivasspor | Trabzon |
| 17:00 TRT (UTC+3) | Hamšík 9'; Elmalı (yellow card) 33'; Gómez (yellow card) 90+1' | Report | Keïta (yellow card) 86'; Gradel (yellow card) 90+2' | Stadium: Şenol Güneş Sports Complex; Attendance: 22,058; Referee: Abdulkadir Bitigen; Assistant referees: Serkan Ok, Kamil Çetin; Fourth official: Tugay Kaan Numanoğlu |

| 12 | Bye |

| 6 November 2022 13 | Trabzonspor | 2–2 | Konyaspor | Trabzon |
| 20:00 TRT (UTC+3) | Bakasetas 14' (pen.), (yellow card) 90+12'; Trézéguet 27' (pen.), (yellow card) 90+11'; Bozok (yellow card) 90+3' | Report | Demirbağ (yellow card) 13'; Michalak (yellow card) 26'; Diouf 45+8', 54'; Karayel (yellow card) 70'; Ikpeazu (yellow card) 79' (yellow-red card) 82'; Yazğılı (yellow card) 87' | Stadium: Şenol Güneş Sports Complex; Attendance: 26,065; Referee: Zorbay Küçük; Assistant referees: Volkan Ahmet Narinç, Hakan Yemişken; Fourth official: Mustafa Kürşad Filiz |

| 11 November 2022 14 | Ankaragücü | 1–1 | Trabzonspor | Ankara |
| 20:00 TRT (UTC+3) | Güreler (yellow card) 26'; Ciğerci 74' (pen.); Mujakić (yellow card) 90+7' | Report | Hugo (yellow card) 14'; Bardhi 70'; Bozok (yellow card) 90+7' | Stadium: Eryaman Stadium; Attendance: 17,383; Referee: Mete Kalkavan; Assistant referees: Aleks Taşcıoğlu, Kemal Yılmaz; Fourth official: Sarper Barış Saka |

| 24 December 2022 15 | Trabzonspor | 2–0 | Fenerbahçe | Trabzon |
| 19:00 TRT (UTC+3) | Trézéguet (yellow card) 18', (goal) 90+11'; Gómez (yellow card) 21', (goal) 61'; Bakasetas (yellow card) 42'; Hugo (yellow card) 55' | Report | Batshuayi (yellow card) 42'; Eğribayat (yellow card) 42'; Crespo (yellow card) 45+7' (yellow-red card) 57'; Yandaş (yellow card) 62' | Stadium: Şenol Güneş Sports Complex; Attendance: 35,705; Referee: Halil Umut Meler; Assistant referees: Ceyhun Sesigüzel, Serkan Çimen; Fourth official: Suat Arslanboğa |

| 28 December 2022 16 | Fatih Karagümrük | 4–1 | Trabzonspor | Istanbul |
| 20:00 TRT (UTC+3) | Ozdoyev 6', (yellow card) 62'; Borini 34'; Colley (yellow card) 43' (yellow-red card) 56'; Ricci 67'; Kouassi 87' | Report | Bartra 20', (red card) 45+3'; Yazıcı (yellow card) 90+7' | Stadium: Atatürk Olympic Stadium; Attendance: 4,071; Referee: Ümit Öztürk; Assistant referees: Serkan Ok, Samet Çiçek; Fourth official: Emre Kargın |

| 5 January 2023 17 | Trabzonspor | 3–0 | Giresunspor | Trabzon |
| 20:00 TRT (UTC+3) | Bajić 30' (o.g.); Siopis (yellow card) 61'; Gómez (yellow card) 62', (goal) 69'; Haspolat 75' | Report | Arias (yellow card) 16'; Akpınar (yellow card) 79' | Stadium: Şenol Güneş Sports Complex; Attendance: 14,947; Referee: Ali Palabıyık; Assistant referees: Murat Tuğberk Curbay, Murat Altan; Fourth official: Kutluhan Bilgiç |

| 9 January 2023 18 | Alanyaspor | 5–0 | Trabzonspor | Antalya |
| 20:00 TRT (UTC+3) | Karaca 14'; Hassan 37', 45+7'; Eduardo 75', (yellow card) 86'; Özdemir 78' | Report | Hugo (yellow card) 36'; Bakasetas (yellow card) 69'; Elmalı (yellow card) 86' | Stadium: Kırbıyık Holding Stadium; Attendance: 4,281; Referee: Mustafa Kürşad Filiz; Assistant referees: Kamil Çetin, Candaş Elbil; Fourth official: Ozan Ergün |

| 14 January 2023 19 | Trabzonspor | 1–0 | İstanbul Başakşehir | Trabzon |
| 19:00 TRT (UTC+3) | Bakasetas 21'; Peres (yellow card) 77' | Report | Gürler (yellow card) 64'; Okaka (yellow card) 85' (yellow-red card) 90+6'; Ndayishimiye (yellow card) 90+5' | Stadium: Şenol Güneş Sports Complex; Attendance: 29,767; Referee: Ali Şansalan; Assistant referees: Cevdet Kömürcüoğlu, Aleks Taşcıoğlu; Fourth official: Volkan Bayarslan |

| 22 January 2023 20 | Trabzonspor | 4–0 | İstanbulspor | Trabzon |
| 19:00 TRT (UTC+3) | Yazıcı 33'; Bartra 48', (yellow card) 53'; Bakasetas 51'; Trézéguet 64' | Report | | Stadium: Şenol Güneş Sports Complex; Attendance: 27,445; Referee: Arda Kardeşler; Assistant referees: Hakan Yemişken, Mustafa Savranlar; Fourth official: Ayberk Demirbaş |

| 28 January 2023 21 | Hatayspor | 2–1 | Trabzonspor | Antakya |
| 16:00 TRT (UTC+3) | El Kaabi 47'; Yıldırım 50'; Çağıran (yellow card) 53'; Boudjemaa (yellow card) 66'; Ribeiro (yellow card) 76'; Çörekçi (yellow card) 90+6' | Report | Bardhi 9'; Çakır (yellow card) 17'; Peres (yellow card) 27' | Stadium: New Hatay Stadium; Attendance: 10,216; Referee: Zorbay Küçük; Assistant referees: Ekrem Kan, Osman Gökhan Bilir; Fourth official: Burak Olcar |

| 1 February 2023 22 | Trabzonspor | 2–0 | Antalyaspor | Trabzon |
| 20:00 TRT (UTC+3) | Trézéguet 34'; Bakasetas (yellow card) 40'; Ünüvar 90+4' | Report | | Stadium: Şenol Güneş Sports Complex; Attendance: 24,016; Referee: Mete Kalkavan; Assistant referees: Mustafa Emre Eyisoy, Ceyhun Sesigüzel; Fourth official: Abdullah Buğra Taşkınsoy |

| 5 February 2023 23 | Galatasaray | 2–1 | Trabzonspor | Istanbul |
| 19:00 TRT (UTC+3) | Mertens 18'; Nelsson (yellow card) 20'; Icardi 53' (pen.) | Report | Gómez 1'; Elmalı (yellow card) 20'; Trézéguet (yellow card) 51'; Gbamin (yellow card) 77' | Stadium: Nef Stadium; Attendance: 48,281; Referee: Halil Umut Meler; Assistant referees: Cevdet Kömürcüoğlu, Ekrem Kan; Fourth official: Kadir Sağlam |

| 4 March 2023 24 | Trabzonspor | 1–2 | Ümraniyespor | Trabzon |
| 16:00 TRT (UTC+3) | Yazıcı 84'; Ünüvar (yellow card) 90+8' (yellow-red card) 90+8' | Report | Epureanu (yellow card) 37'; Sekidika 51'; Nayir 65'; Gürbulak (yellow card) 76'; Özdemir (yellow card) 90+5'; Sackey (yellow card) 90+6' | Stadium: Şenol Güneş Sports Complex; Attendance: 12,343; Referee: Kadir Sağlam; Assistant referees: Kerem Ersoy, Mustafa Sönmez; Fourth official: Burak Pakkan |

| 12 March 2023 25 | Trabzonspor | 4–1 | Adana Demirspor | Trabzon |
| 16:00 TRT (UTC+3) | Yazıcı 8'; Peres (yellow card) 21'; Hugo 78'; Višća 81'; Bozok 90+4' | Report | Belhanda (red card) 22'; Ndiaye 45+1'; Ndiaye (yellow card) 90+8' | Stadium: Şenol Güneş Sports Complex; Attendance: 15,390; Referee: Abdulkadir Bitigen; Assistant referees: Kemal Yılmaz, Mustafa Savranlar; Fourth official: Cihan Aydın |

| 26 | Gaziantep | 0–3 | Trabzonspor |
| | | Report |
Note: Gaziantep withdrew from the league due to the 2023 Turkey–Syria earthquake and Trabzonspor, therefore, were awarded a 3–0 win.

| 1 April 2023 27 | Trabzonspor | 3–4 | Kayserispor | Trabzon |
| 16:00 TRT (UTC+3) | Gómez 3'; Ömür 50'; Bardhi 54' (pen.) | Report | Başsan 1'; Thiam 20'; Sazdağı (yellow card) 22'; Mensah 48' (pen.); Mané 64' | Stadium: Şenol Güneş Sports Complex; Attendance: 9,676; Referee: Erkan Özdamar; Assistant referees: Murat Tuğberk Curbay, Anıl Usta; Fourth official: Mert Güzenge |

| 8 April 2023 28 | Kasımpaşa | 2–0 | Trabzonspor | Istanbul |
| 20:30 TRT (UTC+3) | Chouiar 29'; Eysseric 76' (pen.) | Report | | Stadium: Recep Tayyip Erdoğan Stadium; Attendance: 2,257; Referee: Burak Şeker; Assistant referees: Cevdet Kömürcüoğlu, Murat Ergin Gözütok; Fourth official: Yiğit Arslan |

| 16 April 2023 29 | Trabzonspor | 0–0 | Beşiktaş | Trabzon |
| 20:30 TRT (UTC+3) | Larsen (yellow card) 28'; Bakasetas (yellow card) 74'; Elmalı (yellow card) 87'; Gbamin (yellow card) 90+5' | Report | Saïss (yellow card) 42'; Bulut (yellow card) 60' | Stadium: Şenol Güneş Sports Complex; Attendance: 27,556; Referee: Volkan Bayarslan; Assistant referees: Serkan Olguncan, Erdem Bayık; Fourth official: Kadir Sağlam |

| 20 April 2023 30 | Sivasspor | 4–1 | Trabzonspor | Sivas |
| 20:30 TRT (UTC+3) | Sáiz 27' (pen.), 58'; Yeşilyurt 37'; Erdal (yellow card) 49'; Caicedo 90+3' | Report | Marković 11'; Larsen (red card) 22'; Denswil (yellow card) 75' | Stadium: New Sivas 4 Eylül Stadium; Attendance: 4,117; Referee: Bahattin Şimşek; Assistant referees: Kamil Çetin, Deniz Caner Özaral; Fourth official: Ozan Ergün |

| 31 | Bye |

| 29 April 2023 32 | Konyaspor | 2–1 | Trabzonspor | Konya |
| 16:00 TRT (UTC+3) | Pozuelo 37'; Emreli (yellow card) 71'; Dikmen 85', (yellow card) 86' | Report | Hamšík 12'; Siopis (yellow card) 38'; Bakasetas (red card) 45+5'; Bozok (yellow card) HT | Stadium: Konya Metropolitan Municipality Stadium; Attendance: 11,911; Referee: Cihan Aydın; Assistant referees: Volkan Ahmet Narinç, Anıl Usta; Fourth official: Mert Güzenge |

| 8 May 2023 33 | Trabzonspor | 2–0 | Ankaragücü | Trabzon |
| 20:00 TRT (UTC+3) | Haspolat (yellow card) 9'; Bozok 45+1', 62' | Report | Kitsiou (red card) 10'; Antalyalı (yellow card) 48' | Stadium: Şenol Güneş Sports Complex; Attendance: 11,485; Referee: Erkan Özdamar; Assistant referees: İbrahim Çağlar Uyarcan, İbrahim Bozbey; Fourth official: Kutluhan Bilgiç |

| 18 May 2023 34 | Fenerbahçe | 3–1 | Trabzonspor | Istanbul |
| 20:00 TRT (UTC+3) | Batshuayi 11'; Peres 58'; Valencia 71' | Report | Elmalı (yellow card) 67'; Trézéguet 80' (pen.); Türkmen (yellow card) 90' | Stadium: Şükrü Saracoğlu Stadium; Attendance: 32,622; Referee: Abdulkadir Bitigen; Assistant referees: Süleyman Özay, Mustafa Savranlar; Fourth official: Murat Erdoğan |

| 22 May 2023 35 | Trabzonspor | 4–1 | Fatih Karagümrük | Trabzon |
| 20:00 TRT (UTC+3) | Bartra 8'; Şen 20' (o.g.); Trézéguet 35', 51'; Asan (yellow card) 87' | Report | Diagne 14' | Stadium: Şenol Güneş Sports Complex; Attendance: 7,285; Referee: Turgot Doman; Assistant referees: Mustafa Sönmez, Ali Tuna; Fourth official: Direnç Tonusluoğlu |

| 30 May 2023 36 | Giresunspor | 2–4 | Trabzonspor | Giresun |
| 20:00 TRT (UTC+3) | Genç 74'; Bajić 80'; Savićević (yellow card) 90' | Report | Bozok 30', 59'; Bardhi 34'; Bakasetas (yellow card) 39', (goal) 72' (pen.); Türkmen (yellow card) 48'; Marković (yellow card) 90+8' | Stadium: Çotanak Sports Complex; Referee: Arda Kardeşler; Assistant referees: Ali Saygın Ögel, Serkan Ok; Fourth official: Oğuzhan Aksu |

| 3 June 2023 37 | Trabzonspor | 5–1 | Alanyaspor | Trabzon |
| 19:00 TRT (UTC+3) | Trézéguet 18'; Hamšík 24' (pen.); Bakasetas 32'; Larsen 35'; Bozok 58' | Report | Güneş 14'; Aksoy (red card) 23' | Stadium: Şenol Güneş Sports Complex; Referee: Yaşar Kemal Uğurlu; Assistant referees: Serkan Çimen, Yusuf Bozdoğan; Fourth official: Burak Pakkan |

| 6 June 2023 38 | İstanbul Başakşehir | 3–1 | Trabzonspor | Istanbul |
| 20:00 TRT (UTC+3) | Türüç 34'; Elmalı 48' (o.g.); Lima 79' | Report | Višća 62' | Stadium: Başakşehir Fatih Terim Stadium; Referee: Bahattin Şimşek; Assistant referees: Erdem Bayık, Kamil Çetin; Fourth official: Erdem Mertoğlu |

=== Turkish Cup ===
| 21 December 2022 Fifth round | Trabzonspor | 3–0 | Samsunspor | Trabzon |
| 19:00 TRT (UTC+3) | Bozok 10'; Ünüvar 28', 79' | Report | Çelik (yellow card) 14'; Gönül (yellow card) 58'; Güneren (yellow card) 66' | Stadium: Şenol Güneş Sports Complex; Referee: Kadir Sağlam; Assistant referees: Ekrem Kan, Ata Yıldırım; Fourth official: Yiğit Arslan |

| 18 January 2023 Round of 16 | Ümraniyespor | 1–4 (a.e.t.) | Trabzonspor | Istanbul |
| 20:30 TRT (UTC+3) | Nayir 12'; Eser (yellow card) 25'; Bettaieb (yellow card) 27'; Geraldo (yellow card) 105+3'; Glumac (yellow card) 108' | Report | Boşluk (yellow card) 37'; Hugo 90+3'; Djaniny (yellow card) 90+6'; Bakasetas (yellow card) 94', (penalty missed) 101'; Yazıcı 104', 111' (pen.); Gómez 114' | Stadium: Ümraniye Municipality City Stadium; Referee: Ümit Öztürk; Assistant referees: Esat Sancaktar, Gökhan Barcın; Fourth official: Adnan Deniz Kayatepe |

| 4 April 2023 Quarter-finals | Ankaragücü | 3–1 | Trabzonspor | Ankara |
| 20:30 TRT (UTC+3) | Hanousek (yellow card) 35'; Sowe 51', 83'; Diack 69'; Kızıldağ (yellow card) 89' | Report | Ömür 22', (yellow card) 33'; Peres (yellow card) 39'; Denswil (yellow card) 77'; Çakır (yellow card) 89'; Bakasetas (yellow card) 89' | Stadium: Eryaman Stadium; Referee: Zorbay Küçük; Assistant referees: Ali Saygın Ögel, Ekrem Kan; Fourth official: Tugay Kaan Numanoğlu |

=== Turkish Super Cup ===
| 30 July 2022 Final | Trabzonspor | 4–0 | Sivasspor | Istanbul |
| 20:45 TRT (UTC+3) | Cornelius (yellow card) 30', (goal) 37', 51'; Stryger Larsen 64'; Bakasetas 76' (pen.); Gedikli (yellow card) 90+1', (penalty missed) 90+5' | Report | | Stadium: Atatürk Olympic Stadium; Attendance: 46,732; Referee: Mete Kalkavan; Assistant referees: Kerem Ersoy, Esat Sancaktar; Fourth official: Bahattin Şimşek |

=== UEFA Champions League ===
==== Play-off round ====
The draw for the play-off round was held on 2 August 2022.

| 16 August 2022 First leg | Copenhagen (Denmark) | 2–1 | (Turkey) Trabzonspor | Copenhagen, Denmark |
| 21:00 CEST (UTC+2) | Claesson 9'; Lerager (yellow card) 35', (goal) 48'; Vavro (yellow card) 85' | Report | Kouassi (yellow card) 43'; Bakasetas 79', (yellow card) 84'; Djaniny (yellow card) 85' | Stadium: Parken Stadium; Attendance: 27,520; Referee: Michael Oliver (England); Assistant referees: Stuart Burt (England), Simon Bennett (England); Fourth official: Robert Jones (England) |

| 24 August 2022 Second leg | Trabzonspor (Turkey) | 0–0 (1–2 agg.) | (Denmark) Copenhagen | Trabzon, Turkey |
| 22:00 TRT (UTC+3) | Bartra (yellow card) 90+3' | Report | Kristiansen (yellow card) 23'; Claesson (yellow card) 48'; Ryan (yellow card) 68' | Stadium: Şenol Güneş Sports Complex; Attendance: 36,128; Referee: Danny Makkelie (Netherlands); Assistant referees: Hessel Steegstra (Netherlands), Jan de Vries (Netherlands); Fourth official: Jochem Kamphuis (Netherlands) |

=== UEFA Europa League ===
==== Group stage ====
The draw for the group stage was held on 26 August 2022.

| Pos | Team | Pld | W | D | L | GF | GA | GD | Pts | Qualification | FER | MON | TRA | ZVE |
|---|---|---|---|---|---|---|---|---|---|---|---|---|---|---|
| 1 | (Hungary) Ferencváros | 6 | 3 | 1 | 2 | 8 | 9 | −1 | 10 (Note: Head to head points: Ferencváros 4, Monaco 1.) | Advance to round of 16 | — | 1–1 | 3–2 | 2–1 |
| 2 | (France) Monaco | 6 | 3 | 1 | 2 | 9 | 8 | +1 | 10 | Advance to knockout round play-offs | 0–1 | — | 3–1 | 4–1 |
| 3 | (Turkey) Trabzonspor | 6 | 3 | 0 | 3 | 11 | 9 | +2 | 9 | Transfer to Europa Conference League | 1–0 | 4–0 | — | 2–1 |
| 4 | (Serbia) Red Star Belgrade | 6 | 2 | 0 | 4 | 9 | 11 | −2 | 6 | | 4–1 | 0–1 | 2–1 | — |

Source: UEFA
Rules for classification: Group stage tiebreakers
Notes:

| 8 September 2022 1 | Ferencváros (Hungary) | 3–2 | (Turkey) Trabzonspor | Budapest, Hungary |
| 21:00 CEST (UTC+2) | Nguen 5', 44' (pen.); Ćivić (red card) 16'; Traoré 29'; Bešić (yellow card) 41'; Wingo (yellow card) 80'; Dibusz (yellow card) 86'; Knoester (yellow card) 90+2' | Report | Gómez 39'; Bardhi (yellow card) 42'; Bozok 71' | Stadium: Ferencváros Stadion; Attendance: 17,987; Referee: Fabio Maresca (Italy); Assistant referees: Giovanni Baccini (Italy), Davide Imperiale (Italy); Fourth official: Federico Dionisi (Italy) |

| 15 September 2022 2 | Trabzonspor (Turkey) | 2–1 | (Serbia) Red Star Belgrade | Trabzon, Turkey |
| 19:45 TRT (UTC+3) | Hamšík 16'; Djaniny (yellow card) 50'; Trézéguet 68'; Elmalı (yellow card) 90' | Report | Kangwa (yellow card) 6' (yellow-red card) 63'; Sanogo (yellow card) 52'; Katai (yellow card) 83'; Nikolić 89' | Stadium: Şenol Güneş Sports Complex; Attendance: 24,884; Referee: Sascha Stegemann (Germany); Assistant referees: Christian Gittelmann (Germany), Mark Borsch (Germany); Fourth official: Robert Schröder (Germany) |

| 6 October 2022 3 | Monaco (France) | 3–1 | (Turkey) Trabzonspor | Monaco |
| 18:45 CEST (UTC+2) | Ben Yedder 14', 45+2' (pen.); Vanderson (yellow card) 22'; Disasi 55'; Diatta (yellow card) 74' | Report | Denswil (yellow card) 4'; Gómez (red card) 11'; Bakasetas 72' | Stadium: Stade Louis II; Attendance: 5,050; Referee: Giorgi Kruashvili (Georgia); Assistant referees: Levan Varamishvili (Georgia), Zaza Pipia (Georgia); Fourth official: Davit Kharitonashvili (Georgia) |

| 13 October 2022 4 | Trabzonspor (Turkey) | 4–0 | (France) Monaco | Trabzon, Turkey |
| 22:00 TRT (UTC+3) | Bardhi (yellow card) 23', (goal) 57'; Djaniny (yellow card) 37'; Sarr 44' (o.g.); Hugo 48'; Denswil (yellow card) 52'; Siopis (yellow card) 67'; Trézéguet 69' | Report | Fofana (yellow card) 67' | Stadium: Şenol Güneş Sports Complex; Attendance: 24,343; Referee: Jakob Kehlet (Denmark); Assistant referees: Lars Hummelgaard (Denmark), Victor Skytte (Denmark); Fourth official: Sandi Putros (Denmark) |

| 27 October 2022 5 | Red Star Belgrade (Serbia) | 2–1 | (Turkey) Trabzonspor | Belgrade, Serbia |
| 21:00 CEST (UTC+2) | Dragović (yellow card) 25'; Katai 37'; Pešić (yellow card) 44' (goal) 64' | Report | Bakasetas 39' | Stadium: Red Star Stadium; Attendance: 30,431; Referee: João Pinheiro (Portugal); Assistant referees: Bruno Jesus (Portugal), Luciano Maia (Portugal); Fourth official: Bruno José Costa (Portugal) |

| 3 November 2022 6 | Trabzonspor (Turkey) | 1–0 | (Hungary) Ferencváros | Trabzon, Turkey |
| 20:45 TRT (UTC+3) | Bakasetas 7'; Ömür (yellow card) 45+1'; Hugo (yellow card) 51'; Bartra (yellow card) 81' | Report | Laïdouni (yellow card) 27'; Mmaee (yellow card) 45+1'; Vécsei (yellow card) 88' | Stadium: Şenol Güneş Sports Complex; Attendance: 22,840; Referee: Harm Osmers (Germany); Assistant referees: Robert Kempter (Germany), Dominik Schaal (Germany); Fourth official: Robert Schröder (Germany) |

=== UEFA Europa Conference League ===
==== Knockout phase ====
===== Knockout round play-offs =====
The draw for the knockout round play-offs was held on 7 November 2022.

| 16 February 2023 First leg | Trabzonspor (Turkey) | 1–0 | (Switzerland) Basel | Trabzon, Turkey |
| 20:45 TRT (UTC+3) | Siopis (yellow card) 38'; Larsen 65' | Report | | Stadium: Şenol Güneş Sports Complex; Attendance: 26,184; Referee: Donatas Rumšas (Lithuania); Assistant referees: Dovydas Sužiedėlis (Lithuania), Vytenis Kazlauskas (Lithuania); Fourth official: Robertas Valikonis (Lithuania) |

| 23 February 2023 Second leg | Basel (Switzerland) | 2–0 (2–1 agg.) | (Turkey) Trabzonspor | Basel, Switzerland |
| 21:00 CET (UTC+1) | Amdouni 13'; Hitz (yellow card) 49'; Xhaka (yellow card) 59'; Zeqiri 76', (yellow card) 81'; Males (yellow card) 80'; Ndoye (yellow card) 88' | Report | Haspolat (yellow card) 15'; Larsen (yellow card) 29'; Bakasetas (penalty missed) 27' | Stadium: St. Jakob-Park; Attendance: 24,428; Referee: Antonio Mateu Lahoz (Spain); Assistant referees: Pau Cebrián Devís (Spain), Roberto del Palomar (Spain); Fourth official: Mario Melero Lopez (Spain) |

== Statistics ==
=== Squad statistics ===
| No. | Pos. | Player | Süper Lig | | | | | | Turkish Cup | | | | | | Turkish Super Cup | | | | | | UEFA Champions League | | | | | | UEFA Europa League | | | | | | UEFA Europa Conference League | | | | | | Total | | | | | |
| No. | Pos. | Player | Apps | Goal | Asst | Yellow card | Red card | CS | Apps | Goal | Asst | Yellow card | Red card | CS | Apps | Goal | Asst | Yellow card | Red card | CS | Apps | Goal | Asst | Yellow card | Red card | CS | Apps | Goal | Asst | Yellow card | Red card | CS | Apps | Goal | Asst | Yellow card | Red card | CS | Apps | Goal | Asst | Yellow card | Red card | CS |
|---|---|---|---|---|---|---|---|---|---|---|---|---|---|---|---|---|---|---|---|---|---|---|---|---|---|---|---|---|---|---|---|---|---|---|---|---|---|---|---|---|---|---|---|---|
| 1 | GK | (Turkey) Uğurcan Çakır | 31 | 0 | 0 | 3 | 0 | 11 | 3 | 0 | 0 | 1 | 0 | 1 | 1 | 0 | 0 | 0 | 0 | 1 | 2 | 0 | 0 | 0 | 0 | 1 | 5 | 0 | 0 | 0 | 0 | 2 | 2 | 0 | 0 | 0 | 0 | 1 | 45 | 0 | 0 | 4 | 0 | 17 |
| 2 | MF | (Turkey) Berat Özdemir | 1 | 0 | 0 | 0 | 0 | 1 | 0 | 0 | 0 | 0 | 0 | 0 | 0 | 0 | 0 | 0 | 0 | 0 | 0 | 0 | 0 | 0 | 0 | 0 | 0 | 0 | 0 | 0 | 0 | 0 | 0 | 0 | 0 | 0 | 0 | 0 | 1 | 0 | 0 | 0 | 0 | 1 |
| 3 | DF | (Spain) Marc Bartra | 29 | 4 | 1 | 3 | 1 | 10 | 1 | 0 | 0 | 0 | 0 | 1 | 0 | 0 | 0 | 0 | 0 | 0 | 2 | 0 | 0 | 1 | 0 | 1 | 6 | 0 | 0 | 1 | 0 | 1 | 2 | 0 | 0 | 0 | 0 | 1 | 40 | 4 | 1 | 5 | 1 | 14 |
| 4 | DF | (Turkey) Hüseyin Türkmen | 14 | 0 | 0 | 2 | 0 | 4 | 3 | 0 | 0 | 0 | 0 | 1 | 0 | 0 | 0 | 0 | 0 | 0 | 0 | 0 | 0 | 0 | 0 | 0 | 1 | 0 | 0 | 0 | 0 | 1 | 0 | 0 | 0 | 0 | 0 | 0 | 18 | 0 | 0 | 2 | 0 | 6 |
| 6 | MF | (Greece) Manolis Siopis | 30 | 0 | 0 | 3 | 0 | 11 | 1 | 0 | 0 | 0 | 0 | 0 | 1 | 0 | 0 | 0 | 0 | 1 | 2 | 0 | 0 | 0 | 0 | 1 | 4 | 0 | 0 | 1 | 0 | 2 | 2 | 0 | 0 | 1 | 0 | 1 | 40 | 0 | 0 | 5 | 0 | 16 |
| 7 | MF | (Bosnia and Herzegovina) Edin Višća | 13 | 2 | 3 | 0 | 0 | 4 | 1 | 0 | 0 | 0 | 0 | 0 | 1 | 0 | 1 | 0 | 0 | 1 | 0 | 0 | 0 | 0 | 0 | 0 | 0 | 0 | 0 | 0 | 0 | 0 | 0 | 0 | 0 | 0 | 0 | 0 | 15 | 2 | 4 | 0 | 0 | 5 |
| 8 | MF | (Turkey) Dorukhan Toköz | 6 | 0 | 0 | 1 | 0 | 3 | 0 | 0 | 0 | 0 | 0 | 0 | 1 | 0 | 0 | 0 | 0 | 1 | 2 | 0 | 0 | 0 | 0 | 1 | 0 | 0 | 0 | 0 | 0 | 0 | 0 | 0 | 0 | 0 | 0 | 0 | 9 | 0 | 0 | 1 | 0 | 5 |
| 9 | FW | (Turkey) Umut Bozok | 26 | 8 | 1 | 2 | 0 | 7 | 3 | 1 | 0 | 0 | 0 | 1 | 0 | 0 | 0 | 0 | 0 | 0 | 0 | 0 | 0 | 0 | 0 | 0 | 5 | 1 | 1 | 0 | 0 | 1 | 2 | 0 | 0 | 0 | 0 | 1 | 35 | 10 | 2 | 2 | 0 | 10 |
| 10 | MF | (Turkey) Abdülkadir Ömür | 29 | 2 | 3 | 0 | 0 | 12 | 1 | 1 | 0 | 1 | 0 | 0 | 1 | 0 | 0 | 0 | 0 | 1 | 2 | 0 | 1 | 0 | 0 | 1 | 6 | 0 | 0 | 1 | 0 | 2 | 2 | 0 | 0 | 0 | 0 | 1 | 41 | 3 | 4 | 2 | 0 | 17 |
| 11 | MF | (Greece) Anastasios Bakasetas | 27 | 8 | 5 | 9 | 1 | 11 | 3 | 0 | 2 | 2 | 0 | 1 | 1 | 1 | 0 | 0 | 0 | 1 | 2 | 1 | 0 | 1 | 0 | 1 | 6 | 3 | 3 | 0 | 0 | 2 | 2 | 0 | 0 | 0 | 0 | 1 | 41 | 13 | 10 | 12 | 1 | 17 |
| 13 | DF | (Brazil) Vitor Hugo | 20 | 1 | 0 | 4 | 0 | 8 | 2 | 1 | 0 | 0 | 0 | 1 | 1 | 0 | 0 | 0 | 0 | 1 | 1 | 0 | 0 | 0 | 0 | 0 | 5 | 1 | 0 | 2 | 0 | 2 | 2 | 0 | 0 | 0 | 0 | 1 | 31 | 3 | 0 | 6 | 0 | 13 |
| 14 | FW | (Denmark) Andreas Cornelius | 4 | 1 | 1 | 0 | 0 | 3 | 0 | 0 | 0 | 0 | 0 | 0 | 1 | 2 | 0 | 1 | 0 | 1 | 2 | 0 | 0 | 0 | 0 | 1 | 0 | 0 | 0 | 0 | 0 | 0 | 0 | 0 | 0 | 0 | 0 | 0 | 7 | 3 | 1 | 1 | 0 | 5 |
| 17 | MF | (Slovakia) Marek Hamšík | 23 | 3 | 2 | 0 | 0 | 7 | 3 | 0 | 0 | 0 | 0 | 1 | 1 | 0 | 0 | 0 | 0 | 1 | 0 | 0 | 0 | 0 | 0 | 0 | 6 | 1 | 0 | 0 | 0 | 2 | 0 | 0 | 0 | 0 | 0 | 0 | 33 | 4 | 2 | 0 | 0 | 11 |
| 18 | DF | (Turkey) Eren Elmalı | 32 | 0 | 3 | 8 | 0 | 13 | 3 | 0 | 0 | 0 | 0 | 1 | 1 | 0 | 0 | 0 | 0 | 1 | 2 | 0 | 0 | 0 | 0 | 1 | 6 | 0 | 0 | 1 | 0 | 2 | 2 | 0 | 0 | 0 | 0 | 1 | 46 | 0 | 3 | 9 | 0 | 19 |
| 19 | DF | (Denmark) Jens Stryger Larsen | 32 | 1 | 0 | 1 | 1 | 12 | 3 | 0 | 1 | 0 | 0 | 1 | 1 | 1 | 0 | 0 | 0 | 1 | 2 | 0 | 0 | 0 | 0 | 1 | 5 | 0 | 0 | 0 | 0 | 1 | 2 | 1 | 0 | 1 | 0 | 1 | 45 | 3 | 1 | 2 | 1 | 17 |
| 21 | FW | (Cape Verde) Djaniny | 17 | 0 | 2 | 0 | 0 | 10 | 1 | 0 | 0 | 1 | 0 | 0 | 1 | 0 | 0 | 0 | 0 | 1 | 2 | 0 | 0 | 1 | 0 | 1 | 6 | 0 | 0 | 2 | 0 | 2 | 0 | 0 | 0 | 0 | 0 | 0 | 26 | 0 | 2 | 4 | 0 | 14 |
| 22 | DF | (Turkey) Taha Altıkardeş | 3 | 0 | 0 | 0 | 0 | 0 | 0 | 0 | 0 | 0 | 0 | 0 | 0 | 0 | 0 | 0 | 0 | 0 | 0 | 0 | 0 | 0 | 0 | 0 | 0 | 0 | 0 | 0 | 0 | 0 | 0 | 0 | 0 | 0 | 0 | 0 | 3 | 0 | 0 | 0 | 0 | 0 |
| 23 | FW | (Netherlands) Naci Ünüvar | 8 | 1 | 1 | 2 | 1 | 3 | 2 | 2 | 0 | 0 | 0 | 1 | 0 | 0 | 0 | 0 | 0 | 0 | 0 | 0 | 0 | 0 | 0 | 0 | 2 | 0 | 0 | 0 | 0 | 1 | 0 | 0 | 0 | 0 | 0 | 0 | 12 | 3 | 1 | 0 | 0 | 5 |
| 24 | DF | (Netherlands) Stefano Denswil | 19 | 1 | 0 | 3 | 0 | 8 | 1 | 0 | 0 | 1 | 0 | 0 | 0 | 0 | 0 | 0 | 0 | 0 | 2 | 0 | 0 | 0 | 0 | 1 | 4 | 0 | 0 | 2 | 0 | 1 | 2 | 0 | 0 | 0 | 0 | 1 | 29 | 1 | 0 | 6 | 0 | 11 |
| 25 | MF | (Ivory Coast) Jean-Philippe Gbamin | 19 | 0 | 0 | 4 | 0 | 9 | 1 | 0 | 0 | 0 | 0 | 1 | 0 | 0 | 0 | 0 | 0 | 0 | 0 | 0 | 0 | 0 | 0 | 0 | 4 | 0 | 0 | 0 | 0 | 2 | 0 | 0 | 0 | 0 | 0 | 0 | 24 | 0 | 0 | 4 | 0 | 12 |
| 27 | FW | (Egypt) Trézéguet | 28 | 11 | 3 | 6 | 0 | 12 | 2 | 0 | 1 | 0 | 0 | 1 | 1 | 0 | 0 | 0 | 0 | 1 | 2 | 0 | 0 | 0 | 0 | 1 | 6 | 2 | 2 | 0 | 0 | 2 | 2 | 0 | 0 | 0 | 0 | 1 | 41 | 13 | 6 | 6 | 0 | 18 |
| 29 | MF | (North Macedonia) Enis Bardhi | 30 | 6 | 0 | 2 | 0 | 9 | 3 | 0 | 0 | 0 | 0 | 1 | 0 | 0 | 0 | 0 | 0 | 0 | 2 | 0 | 0 | 0 | 0 | 1 | 6 | 1 | 0 | 2 | 0 | 2 | 1 | 0 | 0 | 0 | 0 | 0 | 42 | 7 | 0 | 4 | 0 | 13 |
| 30 | FW | (Uruguay) Maxi Gómez | 26 | 5 | 3 | 4 | 0 | 9 | 3 | 1 | 1 | 0 | 0 | 1 | 0 | 0 | 0 | 0 | 0 | 0 | 0 | 0 | 0 | 0 | 0 | 0 | 3 | 1 | 1 | 0 | 1 | 0 | 2 | 0 | 0 | 0 | 0 | 1 | 34 | 7 | 5 | 4 | 1 | 11 |
| 32 | MF | (Turkey) Yusuf Erdoğan | 4 | 0 | 0 | 1 | 0 | 3 | 0 | 0 | 0 | 0 | 0 | 0 | 0 | 0 | 0 | 0 | 0 | 0 | 0 | 0 | 0 | 0 | 0 | 0 | 1 | 0 | 0 | 0 | 0 | 1 | 0 | 0 | 0 | 0 | 0 | 0 | 5 | 0 | 0 | 1 | 0 | 4 |
| 33 | DF | (Brazil) Bruno Peres | 7 | 0 | 0 | 3 | 0 | 3 | 2 | 0 | 0 | 1 | 0 | 0 | 0 | 0 | 0 | 0 | 0 | 0 | 0 | 0 | 0 | 0 | 0 | 0 | 0 | 0 | 0 | 0 | 0 | 0 | 2 | 0 | 0 | 0 | 0 | 1 | 11 | 0 | 0 | 4 | 0 | 4 |
| 34 | MF | (Turkey) Doğucan Haspolat | 19 | 1 | 1 | 2 | 0 | 8 | 3 | 0 | 0 | 0 | 0 | 1 | 1 | 0 | 0 | 0 | 0 | 1 | 0 | 0 | 0 | 0 | 0 | 0 | 1 | 0 | 0 | 0 | 0 | 1 | 2 | 0 | 0 | 1 | 0 | 1 | 26 | 1 | 1 | 3 | 0 | 12 |
| 37 | FW | (Turkey) Emrehan Gedikli | 0 | 0 | 0 | 0 | 0 | 0 | 0 | 0 | 0 | 0 | 0 | 0 | 1 | 0 | 0 | 1 | 0 | 1 | 0 | 0 | 0 | 0 | 0 | 0 | 0 | 0 | 0 | 0 | 0 | 0 | 0 | 0 | 0 | 0 | 0 | 0 | 1 | 0 | 0 | 1 | 0 | 1 |
| 50 | MF | (Serbia) Lazar Marković | 8 | 1 | 0 | 1 | 0 | 2 | 1 | 0 | 1 | 0 | 0 | 0 | 0 | 0 | 0 | 0 | 0 | 0 | 0 | 0 | 0 | 0 | 0 | 0 | 0 | 0 | 0 | 0 | 0 | 0 | 0 | 0 | 0 | 0 | 0 | 0 | 9 | 1 | 1 | 1 | 0 | 2 |
| 54 | GK | (Turkey) Muhammet Taha Tepe | 5 | 0 | 0 | 0 | 0 | 1 | 0 | 0 | 0 | 0 | 0 | 0 | 0 | 0 | 0 | 0 | 0 | 0 | 0 | 0 | 0 | 0 | 0 | 0 | 1 | 0 | 0 | 0 | 0 | 0 | 0 | 0 | 0 | 0 | 0 | 0 | 6 | 0 | 0 | 0 | 0 | 1 |
| 56 | MF | (Turkey) Salih Malkoçoğlu | 1 | 0 | 0 | 0 | 0 | 0 | 0 | 0 | 0 | 0 | 0 | 0 | 0 | 0 | 0 | 0 | 0 | 0 | 0 | 0 | 0 | 0 | 0 | 0 | 0 | 0 | 0 | 0 | 0 | 0 | 0 | 0 | 0 | 0 | 0 | 0 | 1 | 0 | 0 | 0 | 0 | 0 |
| 60 | DF | (Turkey) Oğuzhan Yılmaz | 1 | 0 | 0 | 0 | 0 | 0 | 0 | 0 | 0 | 0 | 0 | 0 | 0 | 0 | 0 | 0 | 0 | 0 | 0 | 0 | 0 | 0 | 0 | 0 | 0 | 0 | 0 | 0 | 0 | 0 | 0 | 0 | 0 | 0 | 0 | 0 | 1 | 0 | 0 | 0 | 0 | 0 |
| 61 | MF | (Turkey) Yusuf Yazıcı | 13 | 3 | 1 | 2 | 1 | 2 | 1 | 2 | 0 | 0 | 0 | 0 | 0 | 0 | 0 | 0 | 0 | 0 | 0 | 0 | 0 | 0 | 0 | 0 | 4 | 0 | 0 | 0 | 0 | 1 | 2 | 0 | 0 | 0 | 0 | 1 | 20 | 5 | 1 | 2 | 1 | 4 |
| 63 | FW | (Turkey) Poyraz Yıldırım | 1 | 0 | 0 | 0 | 0 | 0 | 0 | 0 | 0 | 0 | 0 | 0 | 0 | 0 | 0 | 0 | 0 | 0 | 0 | 0 | 0 | 0 | 0 | 0 | 0 | 0 | 0 | 0 | 0 | 0 | 0 | 0 | 0 | 0 | 0 | 0 | 1 | 0 | 0 | 0 | 0 | 0 |
| 67 | MF | (Turkey) Kerem Şen | 0 | 0 | 0 | 0 | 0 | 0 | 0 | 0 | 0 | 0 | 0 | 0 | 0 | 0 | 0 | 0 | 0 | 0 | 0 | 0 | 0 | 0 | 0 | 0 | 0 | 0 | 0 | 0 | 0 | 0 | 0 | 0 | 0 | 0 | 0 | 0 | 0 | 0 | 0 | 0 | 0 | 0 |
| 72 | DF | (Turkey) Arif Boşluk | 6 | 0 | 0 | 0 | 0 | 1 | 2 | 0 | 0 | 1 | 0 | 1 | 0 | 0 | 0 | 0 | 0 | 0 | 0 | 0 | 0 | 0 | 0 | 0 | 0 | 0 | 0 | 0 | 0 | 0 | 0 | 0 | 0 | 0 | 0 | 0 | 8 | 0 | 0 | 1 | 0 | 2 |
| 77 | FW | (Ivory Coast) Jean Evrard Kouassi | 5 | 0 | 0 | 0 | 0 | 4 | 0 | 0 | 0 | 0 | 0 | 0 | 1 | 0 | 0 | 0 | 0 | 1 | 2 | 0 | 0 | 1 | 0 | 1 | 0 | 0 | 0 | 0 | 0 | 0 | 0 | 0 | 0 | 0 | 0 | 0 | 8 | 0 | 0 | 1 | 0 | 6 |
| 80 | MF | (Morocco) Montasser Lahtimi | 8 | 0 | 0 | 0 | 0 | 1 | 0 | 0 | 0 | 0 | 0 | 0 | 0 | 0 | 0 | 0 | 0 | 0 | 0 | 0 | 0 | 0 | 0 | 0 | 2 | 0 | 0 | 0 | 0 | 0 | 0 | 0 | 0 | 0 | 0 | 0 | 10 | 0 | 0 | 0 | 0 | 1 |
| 88 | MF | (Turkey) Emirhan Zaman | 1 | 0 | 0 | 0 | 0 | 0 | 0 | 0 | 0 | 0 | 0 | 0 | 0 | 0 | 0 | 0 | 0 | 0 | 0 | 0 | 0 | 0 | 0 | 0 | 0 | 0 | 0 | 0 | 0 | 0 | 0 | 0 | 0 | 0 | 0 | 0 | 1 | 0 | 0 | 0 | 0 | 0 |
| 96 | GK | (Turkey) Hakan Aydın | 0 | 0 | 0 | 0 | 0 | 0 | 0 | 0 | 0 | 0 | 0 | 0 | 0 | 0 | 0 | 0 | 0 | 0 | 0 | 0 | 0 | 0 | 0 | 0 | 0 | 0 | 0 | 0 | 0 | 0 | 0 | 0 | 0 | 0 | 0 | 0 | 0 | 0 | 0 | 0 | 0 | 0 |
| 98 | GK | (Turkey) Kağan Moradaoğlu | 0 | 0 | 0 | 0 | 0 | 0 | 0 | 0 | 0 | 0 | 0 | 0 | 0 | 0 | 0 | 0 | 0 | 0 | 0 | 0 | 0 | 0 | 0 | 0 | 0 | 0 | 0 | 0 | 0 | 0 | 0 | 0 | 0 | 0 | 0 | 0 | 0 | 0 | 0 | 0 | 0 | 0 |
| 99 | DF | (Turkey) Serkan Asan | 4 | 0 | 0 | 1 | 0 | 1 | 0 | 0 | 0 | 0 | 0 | 0 | 0 | 0 | 0 | 0 | 0 | 0 | 0 | 0 | 0 | 0 | 0 | 0 | 0 | 0 | 0 | 0 | 0 | 0 | 0 | 0 | 0 | 0 | 0 | 0 | 4 | 0 | 0 | 1 | 0 | 1 |
