= Trézéguet (Egyptian footballer) =

Egyptian footballer (born 1994)

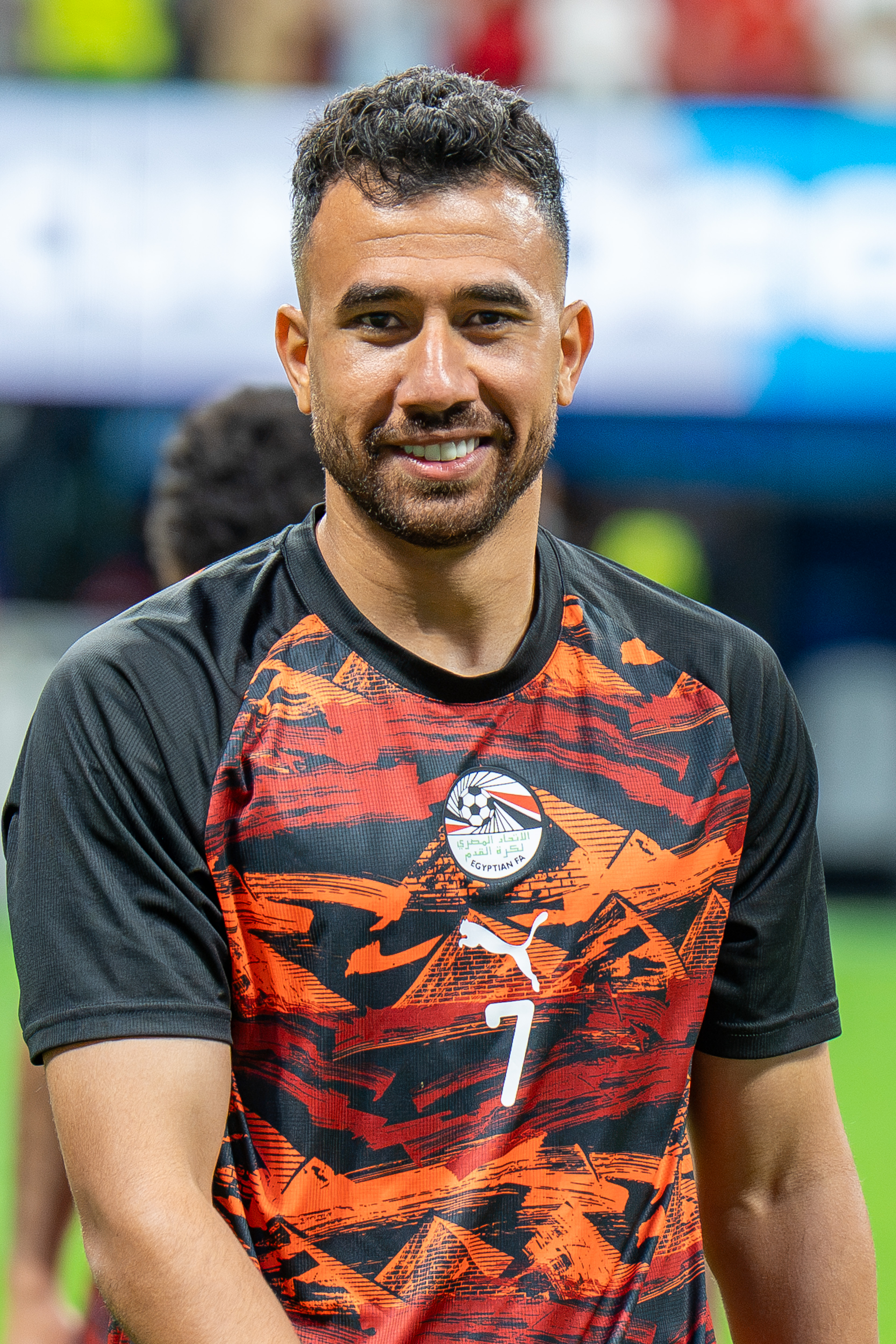
- Trézéguet with Egypt in 2026

Personal information
- Full name: Mahmoud Ahmed Ibrahim Hassan
- Date of birth: 1 October 1994 (age 32)
- Place of birth: Kafr El Sheikh, Egypt
- Height: 1.81 m (5 ft 11 in)
- Position: Left winger

Team information
- Current team: Al-Riyadh
- Number: 7

Youth career
- 2002–2012: Al Ahly

Senior career*
Years	Team	Apps	(Gls)
2012–2016	Al Ahly	58	(7)
2015–2016	→ Anderlecht (loan)	7	(0)
2016–2018	Anderlecht	1	(0)
2016–2017	→ Mouscron (loan)	20	(4)
2017–2018	→ Kasımpaşa (loan)	31	(13)
2018–2019	Kasımpaşa	34	(9)
2019–2022	Aston Villa	56	(8)
2022	→ İstanbul Başakşehir (loan)	13	(6)
2022–2025	Trabzonspor	54	(21)
2024–2025	→ Al-Rayyan (loan)	19	(5)
2025–2026	Al Ahly	21	(11)
2026–	Al-Riyadh	6	(2)

International career^{‡}
2012–2014	Egypt U20	19	(3)
2014	Egypt U23	1	(1)
2014–	Egypt	100	(24)
Medal record
Representing Egypt
Men's football
Africa Cup of Nations
Runner-up	2017 Gabon
Runner-up	2021 Cameroon
Africa U-20 Cup of Nations
Winner	2013 Algeria
- * Club domestic league appearances and goals as of 18:05, 11 October 2026 (UTC) ‡ National team caps and goals as of 21:21, 7 July 2026 (UTC)

Mahmoud Ahmed Ibrahim Hassan (Note: Arabic: محمود أحمد إبراهيم حسن) (born 1 October 1994), known as Trézéguet, (Note: Arabic: تريزيجيه) is an Egyptian professional footballer who plays as a left winger for Al-Riyadh and the Egypt national team. His nickname is taken from the French former footballer David Trezeguet, after his former youth coach noticed similarities of playing style and appearance between the pair. Trézéguet has been described as amongst the best Egyptian players of all time.

Trézéguet began his career with Al Ahly, breaking into the first team at the age of 18 and helping them win the 2012 CAF Champions League and 2013 CAF Champions League. In 2015, he joined Belgian team Anderlecht, and the move was later made permanent. However, he struggled to establish himself in the first team and spent the following two seasons on loan, first with fellow Belgian side Mouscron and later Turkish side Kasımpaşa. With Kasımpaşa, he became the highest scoring Egyptian player in the Turkish top flight in a single season which prompted the club to make the transfer permanent in 2018.

Having represented Egypt at under-20 and under-23 level, Trézéguet made his full debut for the Egyptian senior side in 2014 at the age of 19 in a friendly against Kenya. He was named in Egypt's squad for the 2018 and 2026 FIFA World Cup, playing in all three group matches. He made over 100 appearances for his country's national team, scoring 24 goals.

== Club career ==
=== Al Ahly ===
Born in the city of Kafr El Sheikh, he was given the nickname Trézéguet at age nine by Badr Ragab, a youth coach at his school team, when he noticed that Mahmoud had a shaved head and a clinical goal-scoring instinct that heavily resembled the French World Cup winner and Juventus legend, David Trezeguet. The coach used it to motivate him to become an international star, and the name stuck with him for the rest of his career. Playing as a striker, he joined the youth academy at Al Ahly after turning down an offer to move to Qatar. He soon converted to playing as a midfielder in the youth academy following the advice of coach Ali Maher. After being promoted to the senior squad by manager Manuel José de Jesus, on the advice of Maher, he made his professional debut in the 2012 CAF Champions League as a substitute in place of Mohamed Aboutrika in a match against local rivals Zamalek. Jesus later described him as "one of the best youngsters he's ever came across." He made his first start for Al Ahly later in the competition against Ghanaian side Berekum Chelsea. Al Ahly went on to win the Champions League although Trézéguet did not feature in the final.

In April 2013, he was offered a trial for French side Nice after establishing himself in the first team at eighteen and playing in the U20 African Youth Cup, postponing the trial for a later date to help Al Ahly during an injury crisis that left them short of first team players.

He was later offered a trial with English side Nottingham Forest but the club pulled out of a potential loan transfer with an option to buy after being unable to meet Al Ahly's valuation, stated at £1 million by Al Ahly's director of football Sayed Abdel-Hafiz. In December 2013, he was linked with Scottish club Celtic, who saw a bid of £420,000 rejected. However, he later ended speculation over his future by stating his intention to remain with Al Ahly until at least the end of the 2013–14 season. In January 2015, he won the Best Egypt-based Player Award at the annual Youth and Sports Broadcasting annual gala.

After helping Al Ahly win the Egyptian Premier League title in the 2014–15 season, speculation over his future arose again after it was confirmed that they would "listen to offers" as the club began to experience financial difficulties The end of his season was disrupted after being ruled out for six weeks with a dislocated shoulder suffered during a 2–1 defeat to Tunisian side Club Africain.

=== Anderlecht ===
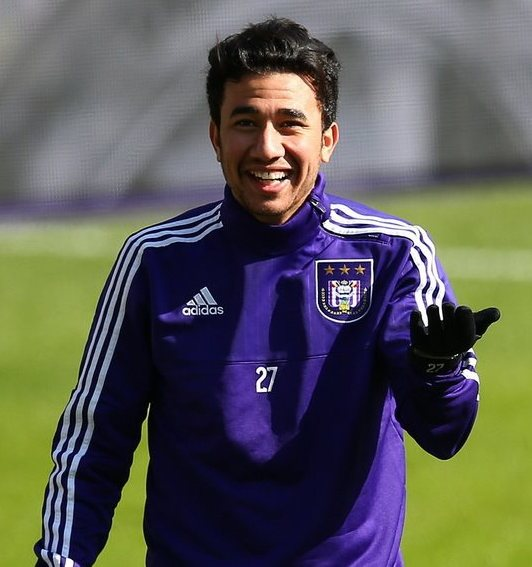
Trézéguet with Anderlecht in 2016

Despite Al Ahly director of football Wael Gomaa stating his desire for Trézéguet to remain with the club, describing him as "one of the main elements of the team", on 6 August 2015, Trézéguet joined Belgian side Anderlecht on loan for a fee of €1 million, with Anderlecht gaining an option to sign him on a permanent basis after the season-long loan for a further €2.5 million. His arrival at the club was disrupted by a broken shoulder sustained while training with his national team in the United Arab Emirates, ruling him out for several months after being forced to undergo surgery. Anderlecht manager Besnik Hasi stated his disappointment in the disruption of the loan spell and admitted that it had been difficult for the club to analyse Trézéguet's ability.

Trézéguet returned to training in early December 2015, before making his competitive debut for Anderlecht on 27 December 2015 in a 2–1 victory over Westerlo when he replaced Dodi Lukebakio in the 82nd minute. Following his debut, Hasi described him as having "great ability and the speed, and I can see a bright future for him." He made his first start for the club a month later in a 2–0 defeat to Gent. However, he was dropped from the side soon after with Hasi claiming that the language barrier was making it difficult for Trézéguet to understand the team's tactics, commenting "He is a diligent player and trains well with us so [...] but he rarely understands what we say," and that he was no longer considered the star player of the team as he had been with Al Ahly.

In March 2016, Anderlecht announced they were considering exercising their option to sign Trézéguet permanently from Al Ahly for a reported transfer fee of €2.2 million, despite only making seven league appearances in his first season. In May the move was completed, with Trézéguet becoming the second most expensive sale in Al Ahly's history after Flávio Amado.

==== Loan to Mouscron ====
He enjoyed a prolific pre-season prior to the 2016–17 season, scoring four times, earning praise from new manager René Weiler. However, the signing of Nicolae Stanciu prompted the club to offer Trézéguet out on loan to gain playing time, eventually joining fellow Belgian side Royal Excel Mouscron on a season-long loan deal. In his first seven appearances for the club, he was directly involved in five goals, scoring two and assisting three including a solo effort against Gent after starting a run from inside his own half, leading manager Glen De Boeck to label him the "most talented player in our team."

Mouscron became embroiled in a relegation battle but Trézéguet gained praise for his performances from Anderlecht coach Jean-Francois Lenvain, who continued working with him during his loan spell, and led former Anderlecht player Wim De Coninck to call for Trézéguet to be recalled by Anderlecht to replace Stanciu, remarking "If he (Trézéguet) had the amount of chances Stanciu has now he'd be in a different place." In the final match of the season, Trézéguet scored the opening goal of a 2–0 victory over KV Kortrijk that saw Mouscron overtake Westerlo to avoid relegation from the Belgian First Division A. After featuring in the Europa League playoffs, he returned to Anderlecht at the end of his loan spell having scored seven goals during 28 appearances in all competitions. Prior to his return, it was reported that Anderlecht intended to sell Trézéguet due to manager Wilder deeming him "not tactically disciplined", an opinion supported by Mouscron manager Mircea Rednic who commented "he runs in every part of the pitch except the part we need him to go to."

=== Kasımpaşa ===
After returning to Anderlecht, Trézéguet was linked with transfers to Turkish side Galatasaray and his former club Al Ahly and even considered terminating his contract with the club. He eventually joined Turkish side Kasımpaşa on a season-long loan deal with the club having the option to make the move permanent for €2 million. He made his debut for the club on the opening day of the 2017–18 season, scoring the opening goal of a 3–1 victory over Alanyaspor. He scored five goals in his first twelve appearances for Kasımpaşa, including a brace against Akhisar Belediyespor in the Turkish Cup, before his run in the first team was interrupted following a three match ban he received after being sent off in a match against Bursaspor.

On his return, Trézéguet surpassed his previous career high goalscoring record for a single season after scoring his ninth goal on 4 February 2018. His tenth goal of the season, scored in the club's following match against Yeni Malatyaspor, saw him become only the seventh Egyptian player to reach double figures in a European league and also saw him surpass Ahmed Hassan's record for the most goals scored by an Egyptian player in the Turkish top flight. His performances saw the club activate their clause to make his transfer permanent.

Despite signing permanently with the club in April, Trézéguet was subject to several transfer offers during the 2018 summer transfer window. He held talks with representatives of fellow Turkish side Galatasaray while attending a national team training camp in Italy, later describing the club as his preferred destination. A move to Italian side Inter Milan collapsed after the club stalled on completing the deal. The deal was to include spending the first year on loan with fellow Serie A side Parma due to Milan already reaching their foreign player quota for the upcoming season. A deal was later agreed with Czech side Slavia Prague, after the side met his €5 million release clause, but was placed on hold by Trézéguet despite personal terms being agreed and the player passing a medical. The transfer was eventually cancelled with Trézéguet declaring his desire to remain with Kasımpaşa. His performances during the 2017–18 season saw him nominated for the Süper Lig Player of the Year award, losing out to Bafétimbi Gomis.

=== Aston Villa ===
On 24 July 2019, Trézéguet joined Premier League club Aston Villa for a fee of £8.75 million, subject to work visa and international clearance. He made his debut on 10 August in a 3–1 loss away to Tottenham Hotspur, playing the first 59 minutes before being substituted for fellow new signing and debutante Jota. Three weeks later, he was sent off in the 54th minute as Villa lost 1–0 at Crystal Palace.

Trézéguet scored his first goal for Aston Villa on 2 November 2019, in a 2–1 defeat to Liverpool. His performance in that game earned plaudits from national football pundits, such as Ian Wright. On 28 January 2020, he scored an injury time winner in an EFL Cup semi-final against Leicester City, to send Villa to their first final in the tournament since 2010.

Trezeguet played a key role in Aston Villa's strong run of form in their final 4 games of the season, scoring 3 crucial goals against Crystal Palace and Arsenal to help them achieve Premier League survival.

On 30 November 2020, Trézéguet suffered a severe facial injury during a Premier League defeat to West Ham United. Shortly after recovering from that injury, but before featuring in another Villa game, Trézéguet suffered a hamstring injury which was expected to keep him sidelined for a month. On 13 January 2021, Trézéguet revealed on his Twitter account that he had recovered from the hamstring injury, but had now tested positive for COVID-19 and was forced to isolate at home. He was finally able to make his return to the first team as a late substitute in a 2–0 win over Newcastle United on 23 January 2021.

On 10 April 2021, Trézéguet suffered another injury setback, suffering a torn ACL after a challenge from Trent Alexander-Arnold in a 2–1 away defeat to Liverpool. The injury was expected to end the 2020–21 season for Trézéguet at a minimum. He returned to the first team on 2 January 2022, in a 2–1 away defeat to Brentford, in which he received criticism for appearing to simulate contact with Saman Ghoddos in order to try and win a penalty.

==== Loan to İstanbul Başakşehir ====
On 8 February 2022, Trézéguet joined İstanbul Başakşehir on loan until the end of the season, in a bid to get more game time and improve his fitness. He made his debut for Başakşehir on 12 February 2022, in a 2–0 victory over Gaziantep, in which he provided an assist for Pizzi's opening goal.

=== Trabzonspor ===
On 4 July 2022, Trézéguet returned to the Süper Lig once again, joining reigning champions Trabzonspor on a permanent deal, for a transfer fee rumoured to be around £4.25M.

==== Loan to Al-Rayyan ====
In September 2024, Trézéguet joined Qatari side Al-Rayyan by signing a one-season loan deal.

=== Return to Al Ahly ===
On 27 January 2025, it was announced that Trézéguet would return to his boyhood club Al Ahly at the beginning of the 2025–26 season for a fee of €1.6 million, and on a 5-year contract.

== International career ==
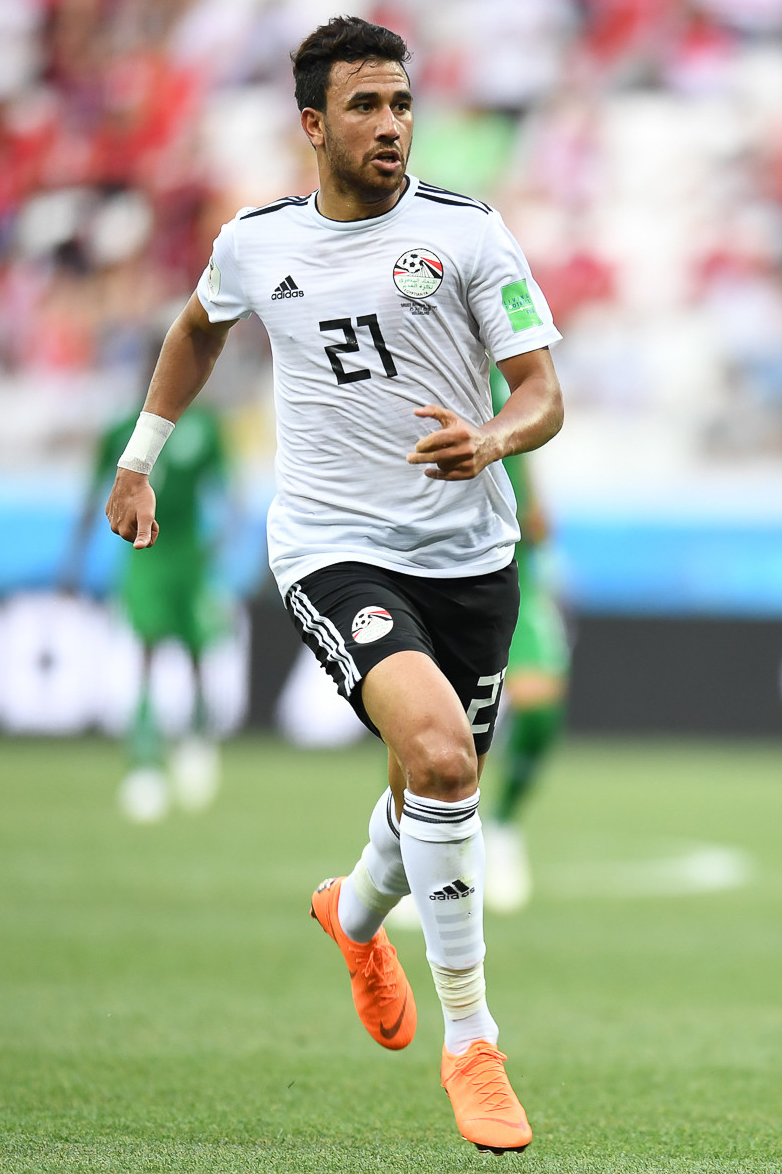
Trézéguet playing for Egypt at the 2018 FIFA World Cup

Trézéguet represented Egypt at U20 level, being named in the squad for the 2013 FIFA U-20 World Cup. In his side's final group game, he scored the opening goal during a 2–0 victory over England on 20 June 2013, dribbling past two players before scoring. However, despite their victory, Egypt were eliminated in the group stage after finishing third. Trézéguet made his debut with the senior national team on 30 August 2014 when he was 19 years and 10 months old in a 1–0 victory over Kenya, before scoring his first senior goal in his third appearance during a 2–0 victory over Equatorial Guinea.

He was chosen by Héctor Cúper for the squad to play the 2017 Africa Cup of Nations, where he was a regular in the team's starting line-up; he helped his nation to reach the final of the tournament, losing 2–1 against Cameroon. He later credited Cúper for his improved form in the Cup of Nations and qualifying matches for the 2018 FIFA World Cup, where he came on as a substitute during his country's decisive qualifying victory over DR Congo, stating "He is a coach who respects those who exert efforts in training and matches." In May 2018, he was named in Egypt's preliminary squad for the 2018 World Cup in Russia. After being included in the final 23-man squad, he started all three of Egypt's group matches, defeats to Uruguay, Russia and Saudi Arabia, as they were eliminated in the group stage.

Trézéguet returned from injury in time to be selected by Carlos Queiroz for the squad to play in the 2021 Africa Cup of Nations - which was taking place in January 2022, due to COVID-19. On 30 January 2022, he scored an extra-time winner in a 2–1 quarter-final victory over Morocco. Trézéguet featured in all of Egypt's matches in the tournament as they were defeated by Senegal on penalties in the final.

On 2 December 2025, Trézéguet was called up to the Egypt squad for the 2025 Africa Cup of Nations. He was named in the 26-man squad for the 2026 FIFA World Cup, making his second appearance at the tournament, a record he shared with Mohamed Salah and Mohamed El Shenawy. On 21 June, he scored his first World Cup goal in a 3–1 victory over New Zealand. A few weeks later, on 7 July, he earned his 100th international cap in a 3–2 defeat to Argentina in the World Cup round of 16.

== Career statistics ==
=== Club ===
As of match played 27 July 2025

Appearances and goals by club, season and competition
Club	Season	League			National cup (Note: Includes Egypt Cup, Belgian Cup, Turkish Cup, FA Cup)		League cup (Note: Includes EFL Cup)		Continental		Other		Total	
Club	Season	Division	Apps	Goals	Apps	Goals	Apps	Goals	Apps	Goals	Apps	Goals	Apps	Goals
Al Ahly	2012–13	Egyptian Premier League	7	0	0	0	–		4 (Note: Appearances in CAF Champions League)	0	3 (Note: One appearance in Egyptian Super Cup, one appearance in FIFA Club World Cup, one appearance in CAF Super Cup)	0	14	0
Al Ahly	2013–14	Egyptian Premier League	20	2	0	0	–		5	0	3 (Note: Two appearances in FIFA Club World Cup, one appearance in CAF Super Cup)	0	28	2
Al Ahly	2014–15	Egyptian Premier League	31	5	0	0	–		0	0	1 (Note: Appearance in CAF Super Cup)	0	32	5
Al Ahly	Total		58	7	0	0	–		9	0	7	0	74	7
Anderlecht (loan)	2015–16	Belgian Pro League	7	0	0	0	–		1 (Note: Appearance in UEFA Europa League)	0	–		8	0
Anderlecht	2016–17	Belgian Pro League	1	0	0	0	–		2 (Note: Appearances in UEFA Champions League)	0	–		3	0
Royal Excel Mouscron (loan)	2016–17	Belgian Pro League	20	4	2	1	–		–		6 (Note: Appearances in Belgian Pro League UEFA Europa League play-offs)	2	28	7
Kasımpaşa (loan)	2017–18	Süper Lig	31	13	2	3	–		–		–		33	16
Kasımpaşa	2018–19	Süper Lig	34	9	4	0	–		–		–		38	9
Aston Villa	2019–20	Premier League	34	6	1	0	6	1	–		–		41	7
Aston Villa	2020–21	Premier League	21	2	0	0	1	0	–		–		22	2
Aston Villa	2021–22	Premier League	1	0	–		–		–		–		1	0
Aston Villa	Total		56	8	1	0	7	1	–		–		64	9
İstanbul Başakşehir (loan)	2021–22	Süper Lig	13	6	0	0	–		–		–		13	6
Trabzonspor	2022–23	Süper Lig	28	11	2	0	–		10 (Note: Two appearances in UEFA Champions League, six appearances and two goals in UEFA Europa League, two appearances in UEFA Europa Conference League)	2	1 (Note: Appearance in Turkish Super Cup)	0	41	13
Trabzonspor	2023–24	Süper Lig	25	10	3	1	–		–		–		28	11
Trabzonspor	2024–25	Süper Lig	1	0	0	0	–		–		–		1	0
Trabzonspor	Total		54	21	5	1	–		10	2	1	0	70	23
Al-Rayyan (loan)	2024–25	Qatar Stars League	14	4	0	0	–		5 (Note: Appearances in AFC Champions League Elite)	2	–		19	6
Al Ahly	2024–25	Egyptian Premier League	–		–		–		–		1 (Note: Appearance in FIFA Club World Cup)	0	1	0
Career total			256	66	14	5	7	1	27	4	15	2	351	84

=== International ===
As of match played 7 July 2026

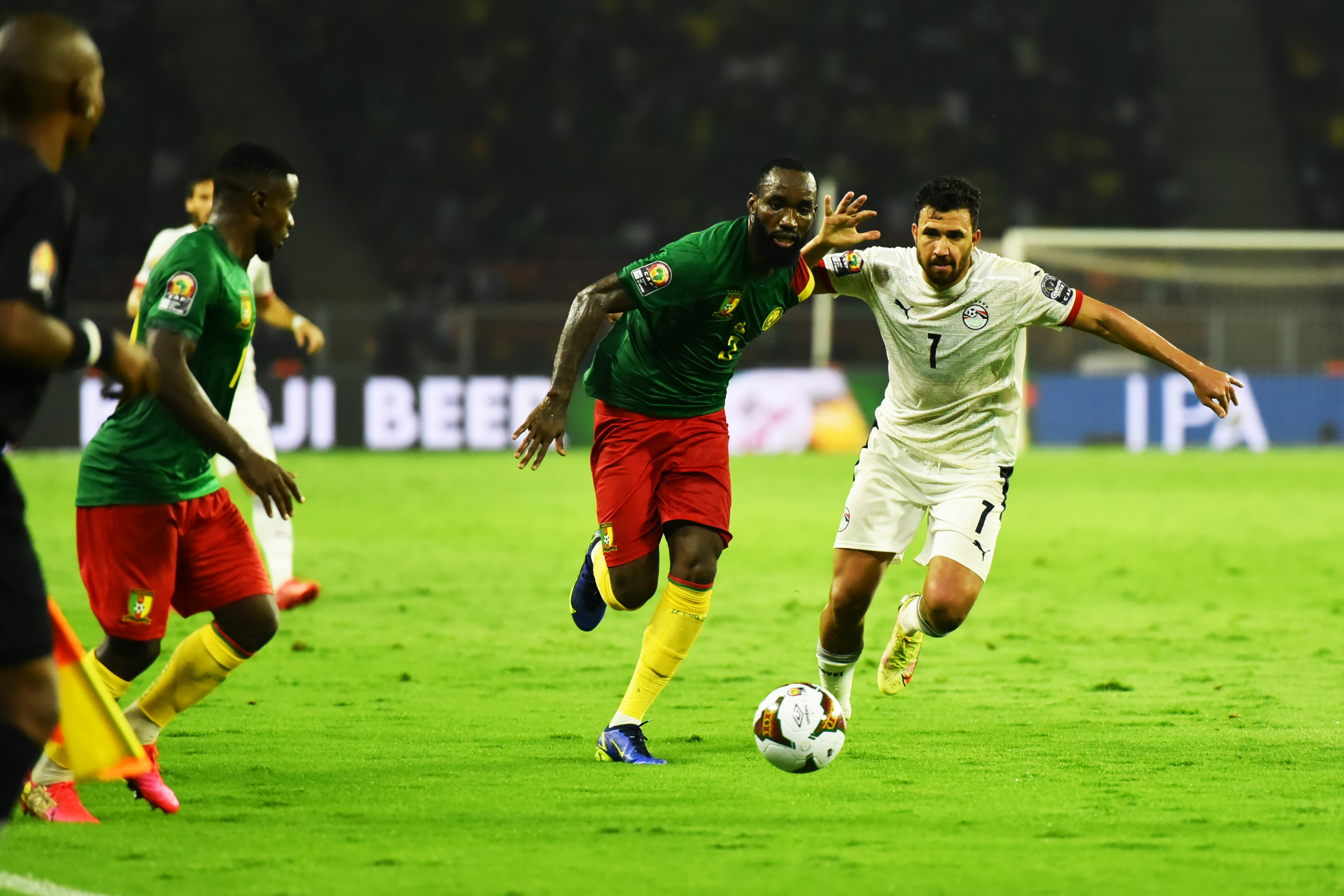
Trézéguet (in white) with Egypt against Cameroon in the 2021 Africa Cup of Nations final

Appearances and goals by national team and year
National team	Year	Apps	Goals
Egypt	2014	2	0
Egypt	2015	2	1
Egypt	2016	7	1
Egypt	2017	11	0
Egypt	2018	11	2
Egypt	2019	11	2
Egypt	2020	2	1
Egypt	2021	2	0
Egypt	2022	12	2
Egypt	2023	6	5
Egypt	2024	14	8
Egypt	2025	8	0
Egypt	2026	12	2
Total		100	24

Scores and results list Egypt's goal tally first, score column indicates score after each Trézéguet goal.

List of international goals scored by Trézéguet
No.	Date	Venue	Cap	Opponent	Score	Result	Competition	Ref.
1	26 March 2015	Petrosport Stadium, Cairo, Egypt	3	Equatorial Guinea	2–0	2–0	Friendly	
2	30 August 2016	Borg El Arab Stadium, Alexandria, Egypt	8	Guinea	1–0	1–1	Friendly	
3	12 October 2018	Al Salam Stadium, Cairo, Egypt	31	Eswatini	3–0	4–1	2019 Africa Cup of Nations qualification	
4	16 November 2018	Borg El Arab Stadium, Alexandria, Egypt	33	Tunisia	1–1	3–2	2019 Africa Cup of Nations qualification	
5	23 March 2019	Stade Général Seyni Kountché, Niamey, Niger	34	Niger	1–0	1–1	2019 Africa Cup of Nations qualification	
6	21 June 2019	Cairo International Stadium, Cairo, Egypt	38	Zimbabwe	1–0	1–0	2019 Africa Cup of Nations	
7	17 November 2020	Stade de Kégué, Lomé, Togo	46	Togo	3–0	3–1	2021 Africa Cup of Nations qualification	
8	30 January 2022	Ahmadou Ahidjo Stadium, Yaoundé, Cameroon	53	Morocco	2–1	2–1 (a.e.t.)	2021 Africa Cup of Nations	
9	18 November 2022	Jaber Al-Ahmad International Stadium, Kuwait City, Kuwait	60	Belgium	2–0	2–1	Friendly	
10	14 June 2023	Stade de Marrakech, Marrakesh, Morocco	61	Guinea	1–1	2–1	2023 Africa Cup of Nations qualification	
11	18 June 2023	Cairo International Stadium, Cairo, Egypt	62	South Sudan	3–0	3–0	Friendly	
12	16 November 2023	Cairo International Stadium, Cairo, Egypt	65	Djibouti	6–0	6–0	2026 FIFA World Cup qualification	
13	19 November 2023	Samuel Kanyon Doe Sports Complex, Monrovia, Liberia	66	Sierra Leone	1–0	2–0	2026 FIFA World Cup qualification	
14	19 November 2023	Samuel Kanyon Doe Sports Complex, Monrovia, Liberia	66	Sierra Leone	2–0	2–0	2026 FIFA World Cup qualification	
15	7 January 2024	Cairo International Stadium, Cairo, Egypt	67	Tanzania	1–0	2–0	Friendly	
16	22 January 2024	Felix Houphouet Boigny Stadium, Abidjan, Ivory Coast	70	Cape Verde	1–1	2–2	2023 Africa Cup of Nations	
17	6 June 2024	Cairo International Stadium, Cairo, Egypt	74	Burkina Faso	1–0	2–1	2026 FIFA World Cup qualification	
18	6 June 2024	Cairo International Stadium, Cairo, Egypt	74	Burkina Faso	2–0	2–1	2026 FIFA World Cup qualification	
19	10 September 2024	Obed Itani Chilume Stadium, Francistown, Botswana	77	Botswana	1–0	4–0	2025 Africa Cup of Nations qualification	
20	10 September 2024	Obed Itani Chilume Stadium, Francistown, Botswana	77	Botswana	2–0	4–0	2025 Africa Cup of Nations qualification	
21	11 October 2024	Cairo International Stadium, Cairo, Egypt	78	Mauritania	1–0	2–0	2025 Africa Cup of Nations qualification	
22	19 November 2024	30 June Stadium, Cairo, Egypt	80	Botswana	1–1	1–1	2025 Africa Cup of Nations qualification	
23	27 March 2026	King Abdullah Sports City, Jeddah, Saudi Arabia	93	Saudi Arabia	2–0	4–0	Friendly	
24	21 June 2026	BC Place, Vancouver, Canada	97	New Zealand	3–1	3–1	2026 FIFA World Cup	

== Honours ==
Al Ahly

- Egyptian Premier League: 2013–14
- Egyptian Super Cup: 2012, 2014, 2025
- CAF Champions League: 2012, 2013
- CAF Confederation Cup: 2014
- CAF Super Cup: 2013, 2014

Aston Villa

- EFL Cup runner-up: 2019–20

Trabzonspor

- Turkish Super Cup: 2022

Egypt U20

- Africa U-20 Cup of Nations: 2013

Individual

- Süper Lig Team of the Season: 2017–18, 2018–19
- Egyptian Premier League Team of the Season: 2025–26
- CAF Champions League top scorer: 2025–26

== See also ==
- List of men's footballers with 100 or more international caps
