= Doğucan Haspolat =

Turkish footballer

Personal information
- Date of birth: 11 February 2000 (age 26)
- Place of birth: Rotterdam, Netherlands
- Height: 1.77 m (5 ft 10 in)
- Position: Midfielder

Team information
- Current team: Westerlo
- Number: 34

Youth career
- 2005–2016: Excelsior

Senior career*
Years	Team	Apps	(Gls)
2016–2020	Excelsior	41	(1)
2020–2022	Kasımpaşa	47	(1)
2022–2023	Trabzonspor	22	(1)
2023–	Westerlo	102	(4)

International career^{‡}
2016–2017	Netherlands U17	14	(0)
2017–2018	Netherlands U18	6	(1)
2021–2022	Turkey U21	5	(0)
- * Club domestic league appearances and goals as of 1 June 2026 ‡ National team caps and goals as of 15 June 2022

Doğucan Haspolat (born 11 February 2000) is a professional footballer who plays for as a midfielder for Belgian Pro League club Westerlo. Born in the Netherlands, he represents Turkey internationally.

== Club career ==
Haspolat is a youth exponent from Excelsior. He made his professional debut on 27 August 2016 in an Eredivisie game against Feyenoord Rotterdam replacing Kevin Vermeulen after 70 minutes and becoming the first player from 2000 who played in the Eredevisie.

Haspolat transferred to the Süper Lig club Kasımpaşa on 20 January 2020, signing a 3.5 year contract.

On 17 July 2022, Haspolat moved to Trabzonspor on a three-year contract.

On 6 September 2023, Belgian Pro League club Westerlo announced the signing of Haspolat on a four-year contract, for a reported fee of €600.000, which could rise to €1.1 million with add-ons + 20% of the profit from a future transfer.

== International career ==
Haspolat was born in the Netherlands, and is of Turkish descent. He is a former youth international for the Netherlands, before switching to represent Turkey.

== Honours ==
Trabzonspor

- Turkish Super Cup: 2022
