= Umut Bozok =

Turkish footballer (born 1996)

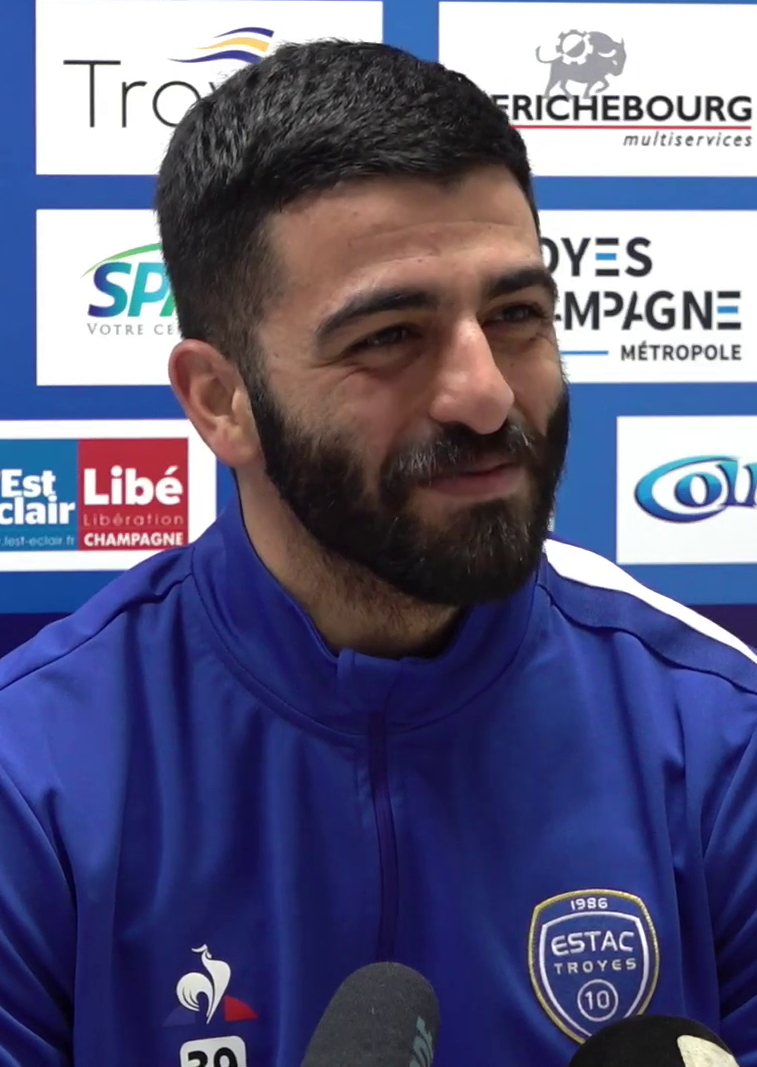
- Bozok with Troyes in 2021

Personal information
- Full name: Umut Dilan Bozok
- Date of birth: 19 September 1996 (age 30)
- Place of birth: Saint-Avold, France
- Height: 1.78 m (5 ft 10 in)
- Position: Striker

Team information
- Current team: Başakşehir
- Number: 17

Youth career
- 2002–2011: Etoile Naborienne
- 2011–2016: Metz

Senior career*
Years	Team	Apps	(Gls)
2013–2016	Metz B	33	(13)
2016–2017	Consolat	31	(18)
2017–2019	Nîmes	61	(26)
2019–2022	Lorient	21	(2)
2021	→ Troyes (loan)	16	(1)
2021–2022	→ Kasımpaşa (loan)	38	(20)
2022–2025	Trabzonspor	44	(10)
2025–2026	Eyüpspor	47	(8)
2026–	Başakşehir	4	(0)

International career^{‡}
2012–2013	Turkey U17	5	(3)
2013	Turkey U18	1	(0)
2017	Turkey U21	5	(3)
2022	Turkey	1	(0)
- * Club domestic league appearances and goals as of 11 October 2026 ‡ National team caps and goals as of 12:56, 16 April 2025 (UTC)

Umut Dilan Bozok (born 19 September 1996) is a professional footballer who plays as a striker for Süper Lig club Başakşehir. Born in France, he played for the Turkey national team.

== Early life ==
Bozok was born in Saint-Avold, in the east of France, to a Turkish father born in Sorgun, Turkey. He holds both French and Turkish nationalities. He acquired French nationality on 15 April 1998, through the collective effect of his father's naturalization.

== Club career ==
Bozok began playing football with his local club l'Etoile Naborienne Saint-Avold at the age of 6. He began as a defender because of his strong physique. He then moved to the youth academy of FC Metz in 2011. After spending three years in Metz's second team, Bozok moved to GS Consolat in Marseille for first-team football. After a successful season with GS Consolat, becoming the top scorer in the Championnat National with 18 goals in 31 matches, Bozok transferred to Ligue 2 side Nîmes on 9 June 2017 for €150,000.

Bozok made his professional debut for Nîmes in a 1–0 Ligue 2 loss to Reims on 28 July 2017. He scored his first professional hattrick in a 4–0 Ligue 2 win over Brest on 20 October 2017. Bozok finished the top scorer of the 2017–18 Ligue 2 with 24 goals in 36 games, and helped promote Nîmes to the Ligue 1 for the 2018–19 season.

On 18 June 2019, Bozok signed with French club Lorient, for three years and one optional. The transfer fee was reported as €1.5 million. On 1 February 2021, Bozok moved to Ligue 2 club Troyes on a loan deal until the end of the season. On 22 July 2021, he was loaned to Kasımpaşa in the Turkish Süper Lig for the 2021–22 season. With 20 goals in 38 games, Bozok was named "Gol Kralı" (top scorer) of the Süper Lig that season.

On 1 September 2022, Bozok signed with Süper Lig club Trabzonspor.

On 3 February 2025, he signed with Eyüpspor.

== International career ==
Bozok represents Turkey at an international level. In his debut for the Turkey U21 national team, he scored a brace in a 4–0 win over Azerbaijan U21 on 28 March 2017.

Bozok made his debut for the senior national team on 25 September 2022 in a Nations League game against the Faroe Islands.

== Personal life ==
Outside of football, he is a pianist and a black-belt in karate.

== Career statistics ==
As of match played 26 May 2024

Appearances and goals by club, season and competition
Club	Season	League			National cup		League cup		Europe		Total	
Club	Season	Division	Apps	Goals	Apps	Goals	Apps	Goals	Apps	Goals	Apps	Goals
Metz B	2013–14	CFA 2	1	0	—		—		—		1	0
Metz B	2014–15	CFA	10	0	—		—		—		10	0
Metz B	2015–16	CFA 2	22	13	—		—		—		22	13
Metz B	Total		33	13	—		—		—		33	13
GS Consolat	2016–17	National	31	18	3	0	0	0	—		34	18
Nimes	2017–18	Ligue 2	36	24	1	0	1	1	—		38	25
Nimes	2018–19	Ligue 1	25	2	0	0	2	0	—		27	2
Nimes	Total		61	26	1	0	3	1	—		65	27
Nîmes B	2018–19	National 2	1	1	—		—		—		1	1
Lorient	2019–20	Ligue 2	16	2	3	2	1	0	—		20	4
Lorient	2020–21	Ligue 1	5	0	0	0	0	0	—		5	0
Lorient	Total		21	2	3	2	1	0	—		25	4
Troyes (loan)	2020–21	Ligue 2	16	1	0	0	0	0	—		16	1
Kasımpaşa (loan)	2021–22	Süper Lig	38	20	3	0	—		—		41	20
Trabzonspor	2022–23	Süper Lig	27	8	3	1	—		7 (Note: Five appearances and one goal in UEFA Europa League, two appearances in UEFA Europa Conference League)	1	37	10
Trabzonspor	2023–24	Süper Lig	13	1	2	2	—		—		15	3
Trabzonspor	Total		40	9	5	3	—		7	1	52	13
Career total			241	90	15	5	4	1	7	1	267	97

== Honours ==
Lorient

- Ligue 2: 2019–20

Individual

- Championnat National top scorer: 2016–17 (18 goals)
- Ligue 2 top scorer: 2017–18 (24 goals)
- Süper Lig top scorer: 2021–22 (20 goals)
