= Salih Malkoçoğlu =

Turkish footballer (born 2005)

Personal information
- Date of birth: 3 February 2005 (age 21)
- Place of birth: Trabzon, Turkey
- Height: 1.90 m (6 ft 3 in)
- Position: Defensive midfielder

Team information
- Current team: Al Jazira
- Number: 74

Youth career
- 2015–2023: Trabzonspor

Senior career*
Years	Team	Apps	(Gls)
2023–2026	Trabzonspor	16	(0)
2026–	Al Jazira	0	(0)

International career^{‡}
2019	Turkey U15	1	(0)
2021–2022	Turkey U17	5	(0)
2024	Turkey U19	2	(0)
2024	Turkey U20	1	(0)
- * Club domestic league appearances and goals as of 10 June 2026 ‡ National team caps and goals as of 21:05, 9 May 2024 (UTC)

Salih Malkoçoğlu (born 3 February 2005) is a Turkish professional footballer who plays as a defensive midfielder for UAE Pro League club Al Jazira.

== Career ==
Malkoçoğlu joined the youth academy of Trabzonspor in 2015, and worked his way through their youth categories. He made his senior and professional debut with Trabzonspor as a substitute in a 3–1 Süper Lig loss to İstanbul Başakşehir on 6 June 2023. On 3 July 2023, Malkoçoğlu signed his first professional contract with Trabzonspor for 5 years.

On 13 November 2025, Malkoçoğlu was banned from playing for 45 days for his involvement in the 2025 Turkish football betting scandal.

== International career ==
Malkoçoğlu is a youth international for Turkey, having played for the Turkey U20 in 2024.

== Honours ==
Trabzonspor

- Turkish Cup: 2025–26
