= Ali Şahin Yılmaz =

Turkish footballer

Personal information
- Date of birth: 1 January 2004 (age 22)
- Place of birth: Araklı, Turkey
- Height: 1.85 m (6 ft 1 in)
- Position: Centre-back

Team information
- Current team: Bodrumspor
- Number: 4

Youth career
- 2015–2024: Trabzonspor

Senior career*
Years	Team	Apps	(Gls)
2024–2026	Trabzonspor	6	(0)
2025–2026	→ İstanbulspor (loan)	8	(0)
2026–	Bodrumspor	4	(0)

International career^{‡}
2019	Turkey U16	2	(0)
2021–2022	Turkey U18	10	(0)
2022–2023	Turkey U19	5	(0)
2024	Turkey U20	5	(0)
2025	Turkey U21	2	(0)
- * Club domestic league appearances and goals as of 17 October 2026 ‡ National team caps and goals as of 5 June 2025

Ali Şahin Yılmaz (born 1 January 2004) is a Turkish professional footballer who plays as a centre-back for the TFF 1. Lig club Bodrumspor.

== Club career ==
Yılmaz is a youth product of Trabzonspor since 2015, and worked his way up all of their youth categories. On 14 March 2022, he signed his first professional contract with the club. He made his senior and professional debut with Trabzonspor as a substitute in a 1–1 tie with Hatayspor on 5 October 2024.

On 13 November 2025, Yılmaz was banned from playing for 3 months for his involvement in the 2025 Turkish football betting scandal.

== International career ==
Yılmaz is a youth international for Turkey, having played for the Turkey U16s, U18s, and U19s.
