= Eren Elmalı =

Turkish footballer (born 2000)

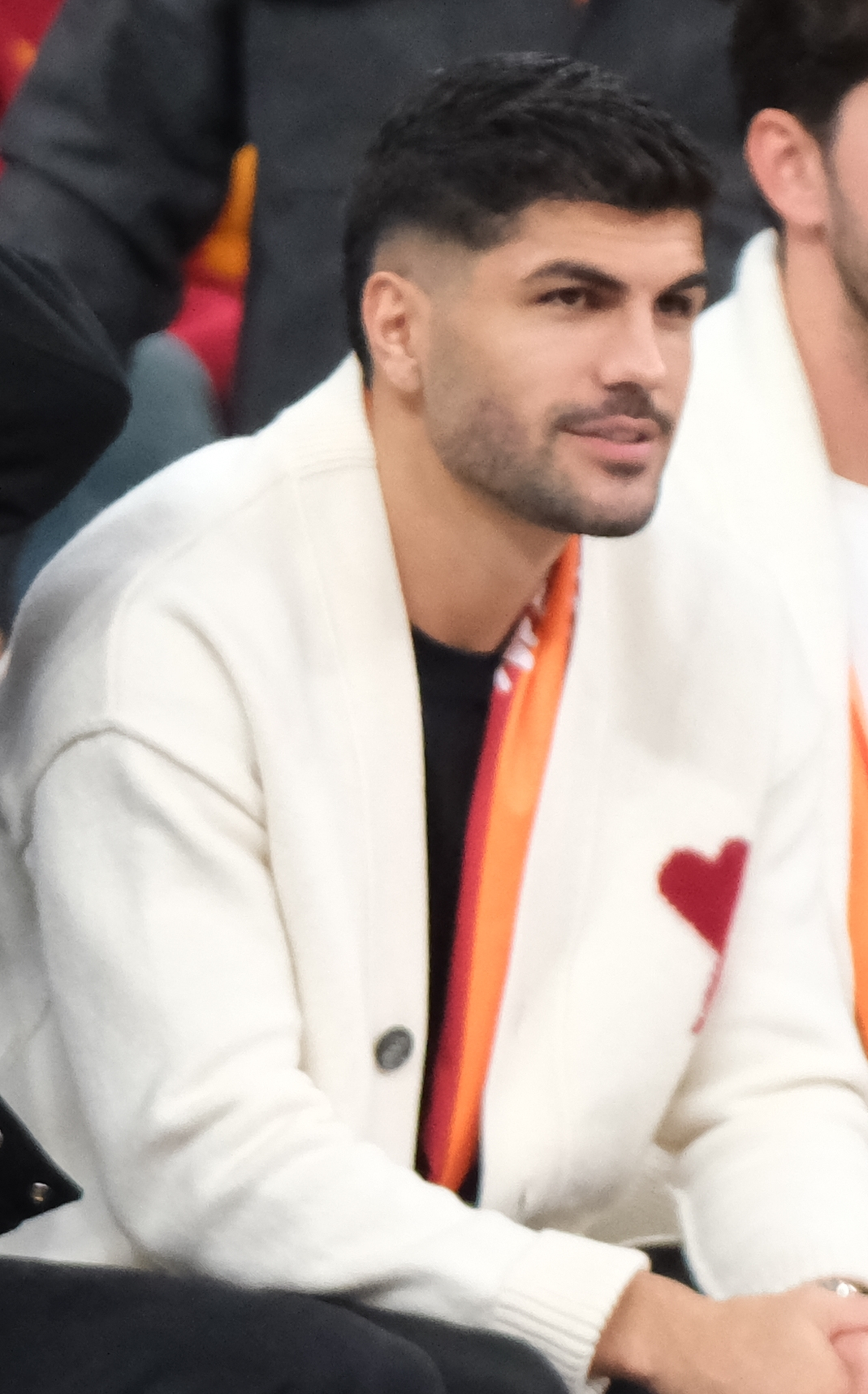
- Elmalı in 2025

Personal information
- Full name: Evren Eren Elmalı
- Date of birth: 7 July 2000 (age 26)
- Place of birth: Istanbul, Turkey
- Height: 1.80 m (5 ft 11 in)
- Position: Left-back

Team information
- Current team: Galatasaray
- Number: 17

Youth career
- 2011–2018: Kartalspor
- 2018–2019: Kasımpaşa

Senior career*
Years	Team	Apps	(Gls)
2019–2022	Kasımpaşa	36	(1)
2019–2020	→ Silivrispor (loan)	25	(0)
2022–2025	Trabzonspor	86	(0)
2025–	Galatasaray	38	(3)

International career^{‡}
2021–2022	Turkey U21	4	(0)
2022–	Turkey	29	(0)
- * Club domestic league appearances and goals as of 23:48, 20 June 2026 (UTC) ‡ National team caps and goals as of 15 November 2026

Evren Eren Elmalı (born 7 July 2000) is a Turkish professional footballer who plays as a left-back for Süper Lig club Galatasaray and the Turkey national team.

== Professional career ==
=== Kasımpaşa ===
Elmalı is a youth product of Kartalspor and Kasımpaşa, signing his first professional contract with the latter in 2019.

==== Silivrispor (loan) ====
He began his senior career on loan with Silivrispor in the TFF First League for the 2019-20 season.

==== Return to Kasımpaşa ====
He returned to Kasımpaşa for the 2020-21 season. He made his professional debut with Kasımpaşa in a 2-1 Süper Lig win over Alanyaspor on 11 January 2021.

=== Trabzonspor ===
On 17 July 2022, Elmalı transferred to Trabzonspor on a 3-year contract.

=== Galatasaray ===
On 11 February 2025, he signed a three-and-a-half-year contract with Galatasaray.

On 13 November 2025, Elmalı was banned from playing for 45 days for his involvement in the 2025 Turkish football betting scandal.

== International career ==
Elmalı was called up to the senior Turkey national team for UEFA Nations League matches in June 2022.

On 2 June 2026, Elmalı was selected in the 26-man squad for the 2026 FIFA World Cup.

== Career statistics ==
=== International ===
As of match played 15 November 2026

Appearances and goals by national team and year
National team	Year	Apps	Goals
Turkey	2022	6	0
Turkey	2023	4	0
Turkey	2024	4	0
Turkey	2025	6	0
Turkey	2026	9	0
Total		29	0

== Betting investigation ==
As part of an investigation conducted by the Istanbul Chief Public Prosecutor's Office, known to the public as the “Football Betting Investigations,” Elmalı's name was included after it was discovered that he had placed bets on a legal betting platform. Due to his involvement, Elmalı was removed from Turkey's squad.

Elmalı admitted to betting on a match that did not involve his own team five years ago. On 13 November, the Turkish Professional Football Disciplinary Committee (PFDK) imposed a ban on Eren Elmalı, preventing him from playing football for 45 days.

== Honours ==
Trabzonspor

- Turkish Super Cup: 2022

Galatasaray

- Süper Lig: 2024–25, 2025–26
- Turkish Cup: 2024–25
