= Arif Boşluk =

Turkish footballer (born 2003)

Personal information
- Date of birth: 6 June 2003 (age 23)
- Place of birth: Sürmene, Turkey
- Height: 1.83 m (6 ft 0 in)
- Position: Left-back

Team information
- Current team: Konyaspor
- Number: 3

Youth career
- 2014–2018: Araklı 1961 Spor
- 2018–2022: Trabzonspor

Senior career*
Years	Team	Apps	(Gls)
2022–2026	Trabzonspor	38	(0)
2026	→ Konyaspor (loan)	12	(0)
2026–	Konyaspor	1	(0)

International career^{‡}
2021	Turkey U19	1	(0)
- * Club domestic league appearances and goals as of 17 October 2026 ‡ National team caps and goals as of 21:05, 9 May 2024 (UTC)

Arif Boşluk (born 6 June 2003) is a Turkish professional footballer who plays as a left-back for Süper Lig club Konyaspor.

== Career ==
Boşluk is a youth product of Araklı 1961 Spor, before moving to Trabzonspor's youth academy in 2018. He started training with Trabzonspor's senior team in January 2022. He made his professional debut for Trabzonspor in a 3-0 Turkish Cup win over Samsunspor on 21 December 2022. He signed his first professional contract with Trabzonspor on 4 August 2023 until 2028.

== International career ==
Boşluk is a youth international for Turkey, having played for the Turkey U19s once in 2019.
