= 2021–22 Sivasspor season =

Sivasspor
2021–22 season
- Chairman: Mecnun Otyakmaz
- Manager: Rıza Çalımbay
- Stadium: Sivas Stadium
- Süper Lig: 10th
- Turkish Cup: Winners
- UEFA Europa Conference League: Play-off round
- Top goalscorer: League: Mustapha Yatabaré (10); All: Mustapha Yatabaré (12)

The 2021–22 season was the 55th season in existence of Sivasspor and the club's fifth consecutive season in the top flight of Turkish football. In addition to the domestic league, Sivasspor participated in this season's editions of the Turkish Cup and the inaugural campaign of the UEFA Europa Conference League, having entered in the second qualifying round. The season covered the period from July 2021 to 30 June 2022.

== Squad ==
As of 12 April 2022

Note: Flags indicate national team as defined under FIFA eligibility rules; some limited exceptions apply. Players may hold more than one non-FIFA nationality.

No.	Pos.	Nation	Player
3	DF	TUR	Uğur Çiftçi
4	DF	GAB	Aaron Appindangoyé
5	MF	GHA	Isaac Cofie
6	DF	GRE	Dimitrios Goutas
7	FW	CIV	Max Gradel
8	FW	NGA	Olarenwaju Kayode (on loan from Shakhtar)
9	FW	MLI	Mustapha Yatabaré
10	MF	TUR	Sefa Yılmaz
11	FW	ESP	Jorge Félix
14	DF	MLI	Samba Camara
15	FW	SEN	Moussa Konaté (on loan from Dijon)
17	MF	TUR	Erdoğan Yeşilyurt
20	MF	TUR	Kerem Atakan Kesgin
21	DF	TUR	Koray Altınay
22	FW	TUR	Emirhan Tak
23	MF	NOR	Fredrik Ulvestad

No.	Pos.	Nation	Player
25	GK	TUR	Muammer Yıldırım
35	GK	TUR	Ali Şaşal Vural
37	MF	TUR	Hakan Arslan
52	MF	TUR	Volkan Eğri
58	DF	TUR	Ziya Erdal
62	DF	TUR	Özkan Yiğiter
76	MF	MAR	Fayçal Fajr
77	DF	TUR	Ahmet Oğuz
81	GK	TUR	Emre Satılmış
88	DF	TUR	Caner Osmanpaşa
90	FW	NGA	Leke James
92	FW	TUR	Halit Çokyaşar
94	MF	TUR	Kaan Onaran
96	MF	TUR	Mehmet Albayrak
98	FW	TUR	Muhammed Emin Ergin

=== Out on loan ===
Note: Flags indicate national team as defined under FIFA eligibility rules; some limited exceptions apply. Players may hold more than one non-FIFA nationality.

No.	Pos.	Nation	Player
—	MF	TUR	Furkan Sağman (at Sarıyer)

== Transfers ==
=== In ===
Date	Position	Nationality	Name	From	Fee	Ref.
25 June 2021	DF	(Turkey)	Koray Altınay	Fatih Karagümrük	Undisclosed	

=== Loans in ===
Date	Position	Nationality	Name	From	Date to	Ref.
30 July 2021	MF	(Nigeria)	Azubuike Okechukwu	İstanbul Başakşehir	End of season	
12 February 2022	FW	(Senegal)	Moussa Konaté	Dijon	End of season	

=== Out ===
Date	Position	Nationality	Name	To	Fee	Ref.
20 July 2021	DF	(Germany)	Robin Yalçın	Paderborn 07	Undisclosed	
23 July 2021	MF	(Ukraine)	Serhiy Rybalka	Oleksandriya	Undisclosed	
27 July 2021	MF	(Brazil)	Claudemir	Vizela	Undisclosed	
12 April 2021	MF	(Brazil)	Pedro Henrique	Internacional	Undisclosed	

== Competitions ==
=== Overall record ===
Competition	First match	Last match	Starting round	Final position	Record							
Competition	First match	Last match	Starting round	Final position	Pld	W	D	L	GF	GA	GD	Win %
Süper Lig	14 August 2021	22 May 2022	Matchday 1	10th	38	14	12	12	52	50	+2	36.84
Turkish Cup	30 December 2021	26 May 2022	Fifth Round	Winners	6	5	1	0	13	7	+6	83.33
UEFA Europa Conference League	22 July 2021	26 August 2021	Second qualifying round	Play-off round	6	3	1	2	6	9	−3	50.00
Total					50	22	14	14	71	66	+5	44.00

Last updated: 26 May 2022
Source: Soccerway

=== Süper Lig ===
==== League table ====
Pos	Team	Pld	W	D	L	GF	GA	GD	Pts	Qualification or relegation
8	Fatih Karagümrük	38	16	9	13	47	52	−5	57	
9	Adana Demirspor	38	15	10	13	60	47	+13	55	
10	Sivasspor	38	14	12	12	52	50	+2	54	Qualification for the Europa League play-off round (Note: Sivasspor qualified for the Europa League play-off round as the 2021–22 Turkish Cup winners.)
11	Kasımpaşa	38	15	8	15	67	57	+10	53 (Note: Kasımpaşa finished ahead of Hatayspor on head-to-head points: Hatayspor 1–1 Kasımpaşa, Kasımpaşa 3–1 Hatayspor.)	
12	Hatayspor	38	15	8	15	56	60	−4	53	

Source: Süper Lig
Rules for classification: 1) Points; 2) Head-to-head points; 3) Head-to-head goal difference; 4) Head-to-head goals scored; 5) Goal difference; 6) Goals scored; 7) Play-off.

==== Results summary ====
Overall								Home						Away					
Pld	W	D	L	GF	GA	GD	Pts	W	D	L	GF	GA	GD	W	D	L	GF	GA	GD
38	14	12	12	52	50	+2	54	7	8	4	28	21	+7	7	4	8	24	29	−5

Last updated: 21 May 2022.
Source: See Results

==== Results by round ====
Round	1	2	3	4	5	6	7	8	9	10	11	12	13	14	15	16	17	18	19	20	21	22	23	24	25	26	27	28	29	30	31	32	33	34	35	36	37	38
Ground	H	A	H	A	H	A	H	A	H	H	A	H	A	H	A	H	A	H	A	A	H	A	H	A	H	A	H	A	A	H	A	H	A	H	A	H	A	H
Result	L	L	D	D	D	W	W	L	D	D	D	D	L	W	W	W	W	D	L	W	D	L	D	L	W	L	L	L	W	W	D	L	D	W	W	L	W	W
Position	16	19	16	16	17	12	11	13	13	14	13	15	15	14	11	10	8	9	12	8	10	11	10	12	11	12	13	14	13	11	12	12	13	13	11	12	10	10

Updated to match(es) played on 21 May 2022. Source: TFF.org
A = Away; H = Home; B = Bye; W = Win; D = Draw; L = Loss

==== Matches ====
16 August 2021 1	Sivasspor	0–1	Konyaspor	Sivas
19:15 TRT (UTC+3)		Report	Bardakcı (yellow card) 54'; Cikalleshi 88'; Šehić (yellow card) 90'	Stadium: New Sivas 4 Eylül Stadium; Referee: Firat Aydinus

23 August 2021 2	Trabzonspor	2–1	Sivasspor	Trabzon
19:15 TRT (UTC+3)	Bakasetas 15' (yellow card) 90+5'; Vitor Hugo (yellow card) 32'; Nwakaeme 47' (yellow card) 72'; Çakır (yellow card) 90+1'	Report	Okechukwu (yellow card) 13' Cofie 70'; Vural (yellow card) 90+5'	Stadium: Şenol Güneş Sports Complex; Referee: Abdulkadir Bitigen

29 August 2021 3	Sivasspor	2–2	Göztepe	Sivas
19:15 TRT (UTC+3)	Goutas 12', 66'; Kayode (yellow card) 70'	Report	Akbunar 51'; Paluli (yellow card) 72'; Şimşek 84'	Stadium: New Sivas 4 Eylül Stadium; Referee: Burak Şeker

12 September 2021 4	Fenerbahçe	1–1	Sivasspor	Istanbul
17:00 TRT (UTC+3)	Osayi-Samuel 24'; Bayındır (yellow card) 44'; Zajc (yellow card) 83'	Report	Cofie (yellow card) 13'; Henrique 44' (pen.) (yellow card) 79'; Çiftçi (yellow card) 90+3'	Stadium: Şükrü Saracoğlu Stadium; Referee: Halis Özahya

18 September 2021 5	Sivasspor	1–1	Gaziantep	Sivas
13:30 TRT (UTC+3)	Yatabaré 21'; Oğuz (yellow card) 36'; Yıldırım (yellow card) 82'; Cofie (yellow card) 90+4'	Report	Figueiredo 90+2'	Stadium: New Sivas 4 Eylül Stadium; Referee: Atilla Karaoglan

21 September 2021 6	Yeni Malatyaspor	0–1	Sivasspor	Malatya
20:00 TRT (UTC+3)	Çiftpınar (yellow card) 80'; Eskihellaç (yellow card) 90+4'	Report	Oğuz (yellow card) 53'; Arslan (yellow card) 57'; Goutas 70'; Fajr (yellow card) 90+4'	Stadium: New Malatya Stadium; Referee: Erkan Özdamar

25 September 2021 7	Sivasspor	4–0	Fatih Karagümrük	Sivas
13:30 TRT (UTC+3)	Kayode 1'; Goutas 49'; Félix 56'; Gradel 71'	Report	Erkin (yellow card) 63'; Zukanović (yellow card) 90+3'	Stadium: New Sivas 4 Eylül Stadium; Referee: Alper Ulusoy

2 October 2021 8	Beşiktaş	2–1	Sivasspor	Istanbul
19:00 TRT (UTC+3)	Yalçın 32', 69'; Souza (yellow card) 64'; Meraş (yellow card) 90'	Report	Yılmaz 54' (o.g.); Yatabaré (yellow card) 72'	Stadium: Vodafone Park; Referee: Yaşar Kemal Uğurlu

16 October 2021 9	Sivasspor	2–2	Antalyaspor	Sivas
16:00 TRT (UTC+3)	Osmanpaşa 10'; Kayode 45+4'; Henrique (yellow card) 80'; Yatabaré (yellow card) 81'	Report	Balcı (yellow card) 9'; Fredy 24' (yellow card) 83'; Sinik 42'; Boffin (yellow card) 45+4'; Amilton (yellow card) 48'; Crivelli (yellow card) 56'; Vural (yellow card) 90+5'	Stadium: New Sivas 4 Eylül Stadium; Referee: Mete Kalkavan

24 October 2021 10	Sivasspor	1–1	Adana Demirspor	Sivas
16:00 TRT (UTC+3)	Gradel 7'; Henrique (yellow card) 51' (yellow-red card) 67'; Yatabaré (yellow card) 74'; Yeşilyurt (yellow card) 84'; Oğuz (yellow card) 90+7'	Report	Assombalonga (yellow card) 84'; David (red card) 84'; Balotelli 90+8' (yellow card) 90+8'	Stadium: New Sivas 4 Eylül Stadium; Referee: Bahattin Şimsek

30 October 2021 11	Altay	1–1	Sivasspor	İzmir
16:00 TRT (UTC+3)	Bamba 44'; Yıldırım (yellow card) 55'; Thiam (yellow card) 62'; Poko (yellow card) 77'; Karayel (yellow card) 90'	Report	Yatabaré 38'; Yeşilyurt (yellow card) 77'; Cofie (yellow card) 79'	Stadium: Bornova Aziz Kocaoğlu Stadium; Referee: Erkan Özdamar

6 November 2021 12	Sivasspor	0–0	Giresunspor	Sivas
13:30 TRT (UTC+3)	Yatabaré (yellow card) 21'; Çiftçi (red card) 84'	Report	Yavru (yellow card) 8'; Doukara (yellow card) 17'; Flávio (yellow card) 51'; Traoré (yellow card) 79' (yellow-red card) 88'	Stadium: New Sivas 4 Eylül Stadium; Referee: Ümit Özturk

20 November 2021 13	İstanbul Başakşehir	2–1	Sivasspor	Istanbul
16:00 TRT (UTC+3)	Gulbrandsen 17'; Tekdemir 24'; Şahiner (yellow card) 43'; Ciğerci (yellow card) 75'; Chadli (yellow card) 78'; Léo Duarte (yellow card) 90+2'; Okaka (yellow card) 90+5'	Report	Henrique 59' (pen.); Goutas (yellow card) 72'; Kesgin (yellow card) 88'	Stadium: Başakşehir Fatih Terim Stadium; Referee: Mete Kalkavan

28 November 2021 14	Sivasspor	4–0	Hatayspor	Sivas
16:00 TRT (UTC+3)	Henrique 22' (pen.) (yellow card) 67'; Yatabaré 43', 48', 86'	Report	Boudjemaa (yellow card) 44'; Ribeiro (yellow card) 54' (yellow-red card) 54'	Stadium: New Sivas 4 Eylül Stadium; Referee: Arda Kardesler

4 December 2021 15	Alanyaspor	0–1	Sivasspor	Antalya
13:30 TRT (UTC+3)	Awaziem (yellow card) 67'; Aksoy (yellow card) 80'	Report	Yatabaré (yellow card) 17'; Kesgin 53'; Çiftçi (yellow card) 85' (yellow-red card) 86'	Stadium: Bahçeşehir Okulları Stadium; Referee: Yasar Kemal Ugurlu

13 December 2021 16	Sivasspor	1–0	Galatasaray	Sivas
18:00 TRT (UTC+3)	Fajr (yellow card) 25' (goal) 80'; Erdal (yellow card) 45+2'; Vural (yellow card) 66'; Gradel (yellow card) 66'; Oğuz (yellow card) 87'	Report	Cicâldău (yellow card) 37'; Luyindama (yellow card) 62'; Yedlin (yellow card) 66'	Stadium: New Sivas 4 Eylül Stadium; Referee: Ümit Özturk

28 December 2021 17	Kasımpaşa	1–3	Sivasspor	Istanbul
13:30 TRT (UTC+3)	Camara 43' (o.g.); Eysseric (yellow card) 49'; Hadergjonaj (yellow card) 51'; Donk (yellow card) 59'; Serbest (yellow card) 70'	Report	Kesgin (yellow card) 43'; Henrique (yellow card) 48'; Fajr 50'; Yatabaré 76', 81'	Stadium: Recep Tayyip Erdoğan Stadium; Referee: Ali Şansalan

22 December 2021 18	Sivasspor	1–1	Çaykur Rizespor	Sivas
17:00 TRT (UTC+3)	Kayode 72'	Report	Potuk (yellow card) 39' (yellow-red card) 53'; Boldrin (yellow card) 53'; Pohjanpalo 74'; Baiano (yellow card) 81' (yellow-red card) 90+5'	Stadium: New Sivas 4 Eylül Stadium; Referee: Atilla Karaoglan

27 December 2021 19	Kayserispor	3–0	Sivasspor	Kayseri
20:00 TRT (UTC+3)	Gavranović 9', 17'; Thiam 23'; Campanharo (yellow card) 36'; Demirok (yellow card) 43'; Kemen (yellow card) 61'	Report		Stadium: Kadir Has Stadium; Referee: Ümit Özturk

9 January 2022 20	Konyaspor	0–1	Sivasspor	Konya
13:30 TRT (UTC+3)	Dikmen (yellow card) 45+2'; Çalık (yellow card) 88'; Bardakcı (yellow card) 88'	Report	Kesgin (yellow card) 23'; James 66'; Çiftçi (yellow card) 88'; Yeşilyurt (yellow card) 88'	Stadium: Konya Metropolitan Municipality Stadium; Referee: Cuneyt Çakir

15 January 2022 21	Sivasspor	1–1	Trabzonspor	Sivas
16:00 TRT (UTC+3)	James 20'; Henrique (yellow card) 67'; Yiğiter (yellow card) 90+5'	Report	Ömür 24'; Türkmen (yellow card) 46'	Stadium: New Sivas 4 Eylül Stadium; Referee: Mete Kalkavan

19 January 2022 22	Göztepe	2–1	Sivasspor	İzmir
17:00 TRT (UTC+3)	Nwobodo (yellow card) 16'; Nukan 22'; Lourency (yellow card) 44'; Arslanagić (yellow card) 49'; Tijanić 80'; Aydoğdu (yellow card) 84'	Report	Henrique 50' (pen.); Camara (yellow card) 53'; Kesgin (yellow card) 62'; Osmanpaşa (yellow card) 88'; Kayode (yellow card) 90+3'	Stadium: Gürsel Aksel Stadium; Referee: Suat Arslanboga

22 January 2022 23	Sivasspor	1–1	Fenerbahçe	Sivas
16:00 TRT (UTC+3)	Altınay (yellow card) 15'; Henrique 74'; Oğuz (yellow card) 83'	Report	Zajc 18'; Aziz (yellow card) 34'; Sangaré (yellow card) 65'; Crespo (yellow card) 73'	Stadium: New Sivas 4 Eylül Stadium; Referee: Alper Ulusoy

5 February 2022 24	Gaziantep	5–1	Sivasspor	Gaziantep
13:30 TRT (UTC+3)	Djilobodji 6', 41'; Demir 12' (yellow card) 45+6'; Vetrih (yellow card) 61'; Maxim 70' (pen.); Soyalp 76'; Kitsiou (yellow card) 80'; Sagal (yellow card) 86'	Report	Goutas 29'; Cofie (yellow card) 59'; Gradel (yellow card) 61'; Yatabaré (red card) 63'; Osmanpaşa (yellow card) 86'	Stadium: New Gaziantep Stadium; Referee: Mustafa Filiz

13 February 2022 25	Sivasspor	2–1	Yeni Malatyaspor	Sivas
13:30 TRT (UTC+3)	Kayode 52'; Goutas (yellow card) 59'; Fajr 70'; Yılmaz (yellow card) 90+4'	Report	Özer 31'; Donsah (yellow card) 64'	Stadium: New Sivas 4 Eylül Stadium; Referee: Arda Kardesler

20 February 2022 26	Fatih Karagümrük	1–0	Sivasspor	Istanbul
16:00 TRT (UTC+3)	Borini 68' (pen.); Durmaz (yellow card) 87'; Mor (yellow card) 87'; Bekaroğlu (yellow card) 90+1'	Report	Cofie (yellow card) 44'; Çiftçi (yellow card) 67'; Gradel (yellow card) 90'; Kesgin (yellow card) 90+3'	Stadium: Atatürk Olympic Stadium; Referee: Mert Guzenge

26 February 2022 27	Sivasspor	2–3	Beşiktaş	Sivas
19:00 TRT (UTC+3)	Yatabaré 26'; Fajr 85' (pen.)	Report	Welinton (yellow card) 3'; Batshuayi 12', 73' (pen.); Ghezzal 43'; Hutchinson (yellow card) 50'; Destanoğlu (yellow card) 90+8'	Stadium: New Sivas 4 Eylül Stadium; Referee: Sarper Baris Saka

6 March 2022 28	Antalyaspor	1–0	Sivasspor	Antalya
19:00 TRT (UTC+3)	Fernando 45+2'	Report		Stadium: Antalya Stadium; Referee: Cunryt Çakir

13 March 2022 29	Adana Demirspor	2–3	Sivasspor	Adana
16:00 TRT (UTC+3)	Stambouli 58'; Balotelli 68' (pen.); Muric (yellow card) 78'; Sanuç (yellow card) 84'	Report	Henrique 28', 54', 90+2' (pen.); Yeşilyurt (yellow card) 42'; Konaté (yellow card) 78'; Erdal (yellow card) 83'	Stadium: New Adana Stadium; Referee: Çagdas Altay

20 March 2022 30	Sivasspor	2–1	Altay	Sivas
13:30 TRT (UTC+3)	Fajr (yellow card) 45+1'; Kayode 78'; Yatabaré 90+1'	Report	Gülselam (yellow card) 45+1'; Rodríguez 54'; Poko (yellow card) 73'	Stadium: New Sivas 4 Eylül Stadium; Referee: Atilla Karaoglan

2 April 2022 31	Giresunspor	2–2	Sivasspor	Giresun
13:30 TRT (UTC+3)	Nayir 73'; Çiftçi 79' (o.g.)	Report	Kayode 39'; Gradel 44'; Yeşilyurt (yellow card) 53'	Stadium: Çotanak Stadyumu; Referee: Arda Kardeşler

10 April 2022 32	Sivasspor	0–2	İstanbul Başakşehir	Sivas
16:00 TRT (UTC+3)	Çiftçi (yellow card) 38'; Oğuz (yellow card) 66'	Report	Goutas 3' (o.g.); Tekdemir (yellow card) 28'; Caiçara (yellow card) 54'; Türüç 60'; Epureanu (yellow card) 90+2'	Stadium: New Sivas 4 Eylül Stadium; Referee: Halil Meler

16 April 2022 33	Hatayspor	1–1	Sivasspor	Antakya
13:30 TRT (UTC+3)	Sackey (yellow card) 40'; Benzia 61'; Munir (yellow card) 78'	Report	Erdal 28' (pen.); Gradel (yellow card) 78'	Stadium: New Hatay Stadium; Referee: Ozan Ergün

25 April 2022 34	Sivasspor	1–0	Alanyaspor	Sivas
20:30 TRT (UTC+3)	Goutas (yellow card) 36'; Fajr 52' (pen.); Yeşilyurt (yellow card) 90+1'	Report	Novais (yellow card) 34'; Milunović (yellow card) 51'; Karaca (yellow card) 76'; Candeias (yellow card) 89'; Awaziem (yellow card) 90+1'	Stadium: New Sivas 4 Eylül Stadium; Referee: Umit Öztürk

1 May 2022 35	Galatasaray	2–3	Sivasspor	Istanbul
20:30 TRT (UTC+3)	Gomis 10', 58' (pen.); Kılınç (yellow card) 15'; Boey (yellow card) 30'	Report	Fajr (yellow card) 30'; Yatabaré 44'; Ulvestad 49' (yellow card) 52'; Appindangoyé (yellow card) 61'; Oğuz 64' (yellow card) 77'	Stadium: Nef Stadium; Referee: Kadir Sağlam

7 May 2022 36	Sivasspor	1–3	Kasımpaşa	Sivas
16:00 TRT (UTC+3)	Félix 90+2' (yellow card) 90+4'; Yeşilyurt (yellow card) 90+5'	Report	Haspolat (yellow card) 45+1'; Elmalı 58'; Eysseric 73'; Bozok 77'; Yıldırım (yellow card) 85'	Stadium: New Sivas 4 Eylül Stadium; Referee: Ali Şansalan

16 May 2022 37	Çaykur Rizespor	1–2	Sivasspor	Rize
20:00 TRT (UTC+3)	Boyd 22'; Phiri (yellow card) 36'; Ponck (yellow card) 65'	Report	Yeşilyurt 31'; Arslan (yellow card) 55'; Ulvestad 75' (yellow card) 89'; Yatabaré (yellow card) 83'	Stadium: Yeni Rize Şehir Stadium; Referee: Suat Arslanboğa

21 May 2022 38	Sivasspor	2–1	Kayserispor	Sivas
16:00 TRT (UTC+3)	Félix 21'; Kesgin 63'	Report	Cardoso 56'	Stadium: New Sivas 4 Eylül Stadium; Referee: Yaşar Kemal Uğurlu

=== Turkish Cup ===
30 December 2021 Fifth round	Sivasspor	2–1	MKE Ankaragücü	Sivas
17:00 TRT (UTC+3)	James 18', 56'	Report	Çetin 73'	Stadium: New Sivas 4 Eylül Stadium; Referee: Bahattin Şimsek

9 February 2022 Round of 16	Bandırmaspor	2–4	Sivasspor	Bandırma
13:30 TRT (UTC+3)	Gör (red card) 24'; Ayçiçek 34'; Değirmenci (yellow card) 35'; Landel 54'; Mulumba (yellow card) 78'	Report	Gradel 2', 45+3', 84'; Fajr (yellow card) 32'; Altınay (yellow card) 62'; Appindangoyé 79'; Kesgin (yellow card) 90'	Stadium: 17 Eylül Stadium; Referee: Volkan Bayarslan

2 March 2022 Quarter-finals	Sivasspor	1–0	Fatih Karagümrük	Sivas
17:00 TRT (UTC+3)	Yatabaré 69'	Report	Bekaroğlu (yellow card) 61'; Karamoh (yellow card) 90+4'	Stadium: New Sivas 4 Eylül Stadium; Referee: Arda Kardesler

20 April 2022 Semi-final First leg	Alanyaspor	1–2	Sivasspor	Antalya
20:30 TRT (UTC+3)	Akbaba 6'; Bayır (yellow card) 24'	Report	Yatabaré 32' (yellow card) 59' (yellow-red card) 59'; Ulvestad (yellow card) 54'; Gradel (yellow card) 58'; Kesgin (yellow card) 88' (goal) 90+2'	Stadium: Bahçeşehir Okulları Stadium; Referee: Ali Şansalan

11 May 2022 Semi-final Second leg	Sivasspor	1–1 (3–2 agg.)	Alanyaspor	Sivas
20:30 TRT (UTC+3)	Ulvestad (yellow card) 54'; Oğuz (yellow card) 45'; Arslan 88' (yellow card) 88'	Report	Bayır (yellow card) 54'; Diédhiou 78'; Candeias (yellow card) 86'; Karaca (yellow card) 88'; Novais (yellow card) 90+4'; Awaziem (yellow card) 90+11'	Stadium: New Sivas 4 Eylül Stadium; Referee: Atilla Karaoğlan

26 May 2022 Final	Kayserispor	2–3 (a.e.t.)	Sivasspor	Istanbul
20:45 TRT (UTC+3)	Civelek 33'; Carole (yellow card) 74'; Akdağ (yellow card) 105+4'; Parlak 107'; Bulut (yellow card) 120+3'	Report	Appindangoyé 60'; Gradel 95'; Yeşilyurt (yellow card) 95'; Konaté 113' (yellow card) 120+2'	Stadium: Atatürk Olimpiyat; Referee: Halil Umut Meler

=== UEFA Europa Conference League ===
==== Qualifying rounds ====
22 July 2021 Second qualifying round 1st leg	Petrocub Hîncești (Moldova)	0–1	(Turkey) Sivasspor	Chișinău, Moldova
20:00 TRT (UTC+3)	Jardan (yellow card) 30'; Plătică (yellow card) 39'; Meira (yellow card) 71'; Bogaciuc (yellow card) 72'; Onana (yellow card) 90+4'	Report	Osmanpaşa 16'; Yılmaz (yellow card) 41'; Fajr (yellow card) 69'	Stadium: Zimbru Stadium; Attendance: 2,143; Referee: Jérémie Pignard (France)
Note: Petrocub Hîncești played their home matches at Zimbru Stadium, Chișinău, instead of their regular stadium Stadionul Municipal, Hîncești, which did not meet UEFA requirements.

29 July 2021 Second qualifying round 2nd leg	Sivasspor (Turkey)	1–0 (2–0 agg.)	(Moldova) Petrocub Hîncești	Sivas, Turkey
20:00 TRT (UTC+3)	Kayode 65'; Altınay (yellow card) 76'	Report	Sandu (yellow card) 11'; Bogaciuc (yellow card) 77'; Plătică (yellow card) 82'	Stadium: New Sivas 4 Eylül Stadium; Attendance: 8,504; Referee: Donald Robertson (Scotland)

5 August 2021 Third qualifying round 1st leg	Dinamo Batumi (Georgia (country))	1–2	(Turkey) Sivasspor	Batumi, Georgia
20:00 TRT (UTC+3)	Mamuchashvili 54'; T.Gaprindashvili (yellow card) 88' (yellow-red card) 90+8'	Report	Okechukwu (yellow card) 17'; Altınay (yellow card) 52'; Vural (yellow card) 69'; Arslan (yellow card) 69'; James 75'; Fajr (yellow card) 89'; Kayode 90+5'; Çiftçi (yellow card) 90+8'	Stadium: Batumi Stadium; Attendance: 12,250; Referee: Irfan Peljto (Bosnia and Herzegovina)

12 August 2021 Third qualifying round 2nd leg	Sivasspor (Turkey)	1–1 (a.e.t.) (3–2 agg.)	(Georgia (country)) Dinamo Batumi	Sivas, Turkey
20:00 TRT (UTC+3)	Oğuz (yellow card) 25'; Fajr (yellow card) 44'; Félix 109' (yellow card) 110'	Report	Mandzhgaladze (yellow card) 2'; G.Pantsulaia 78'; B.Teidi (yellow card) 107'; Navalovski (yellow card) 118'	Stadium: New Sivas 4 Eylül Stadium; Attendance: 7,920; Referee: Ricardo de Burgos (Spain)

19 August 2021 Play-off round 1st leg	Sivasspor (Turkey)	1–2	(Denmark) Copenhagen	Sivas, Turkey
21:00 TRT (UTC+3)	Osmanpaşa (yellow card) 46'; James 59'; Kayode (yellow card) 70'; Çiftçi (yellow card) 77'; Arslan (yellow card) 88'; Gradel (yellow card) 90+1'	Report	Daramy (yellow card) 22'; Khocholava (yellow card) 42'; Diks 55'; Stage 60' (yellow card) 70'; Oikonomou (yellow card) 90+1'	Stadium: New Sivas 4 Eylül Stadium; Attendance: 2,602; Referee: Mykola Balakin (Ukraine)

26 August 2021 Play-off round 2nd leg	Copenhagen (Denmark)	5–0 (7–1 agg.)	(Turkey) Sivasspor	Copenhagen, Denmark
20:00 TRT (UTC+3)	Stage 24'; Daramy 39'; Lerager 57' (yellow card) 69'; Biel 62'; Højlund 76'	Report	Altınay (yellow card) 24'; Erdal (yellow card) 30'; Oğuz (yellow card) 90+4'	Stadium: Parken Stadium; Attendance: 18,214; Referee: Lawrence Visser (Belgium)

== Squad statistics ==
As of match played 26 May 2022

=== Appearances and goals ===
No.	Pos	Nat	Player	Total		Süper Lig		Turkish Cup		UEFA Europa Conference League	
No.	Pos	Nat	Player	Apps	Goals	Apps	Goals	Apps	Goals	Apps	Goals
3	DF	(Turkey) TUR	Uğur Çiftçi	44	0	29+5	0	4	0	6	0
4	DF	(Gabon) GAB	Aaron Appindangoyé	9	2	3+1	0	5	2	0	0
5	MF	(Ghana) GHA	Isaac Cofie	37	1	20+8	1	2+3	0	3+1	0
6	DF	(Greece) GRE	Dimitrios Goutas	38	5	31+1	5	0+3	0	3	0
7	FW	(Ivory Coast) CIV	Max Gradel	39	7	29+2	3	5	4	2+1	0
8	FW	(Nigeria) NGA	Olarenwaju Kayode	44	8	18+15	6	3+2	0	6	2
9	FW	(Mali) MLI	Mustapha Yatabaré	43	12	24+9	10	3+1	2	1+5	0
10	MF	(Turkey) TUR	Sefa Yılmaz	30	0	3+19	0	0+3	0	4+1	0
11	FW	(Spain) ESP	Jorge Félix	20	4	6+6	3	2	0	1+5	1
14	DF	(Mali) MLI	Samba Camara	23	0	14+5	0	3	0	0+1	0
15	FW	(Senegal) SEN	Moussa Konaté	16	1	1+11	0	0+4	1	0	0
17	MF	(Turkey) TUR	Erdoğan Yeşilyurt	40	1	20+13	1	5+1	0	0+1	0
20	MF	(Turkey) TUR	Kerem Kesgin	27	3	14+8	2	1+4	1	0	0
21	DF	(Turkey) TUR	Koray Altınay	12	0	5	0	1	0	4+2	0
22	FW	(Turkey) TUR	Emirhan Tak	1	0	0+1	0	0	0	0	0
23	MF	(Norway) NOR	Fredrik Ulvestad	19	2	11+5	2	3	0	0	0
25	GK	(Turkey) TUR	Muammer Yıldırım	14	0	12	0	2	0	0	0
35	GK	(Turkey) TUR	Ali Vural	35	0	25	0	4	0	6	0
37	MF	(Turkey) TUR	Hakan Arslan	41	1	24+7	0	4	1	6	0
58	DF	(Turkey) TUR	Ziya Erdal	25	1	9+8	1	2+1	0	1+4	0
62	DF	(Turkey) TUR	Özkan Yiğiter	14	0	5+7	0	0	0	0+2	0
76	MF	(Morocco) MAR	Fayçal Fajr	39	5	27+2	5	5	0	5	0
77	DF	(Turkey) TUR	Ahmet Oğuz	35	1	23+3	1	4	0	5	0
81	GK	(Turkey) TUR	Emre Satılmış	1	0	1	0	0	0	0	0
88	DF	(Turkey) TUR	Caner Osmanpaşa	42	2	31+1	1	4+1	0	5	1
90	FW	(Nigeria) NGA	Leke James	19	6	4+8	2	1	2	3+3	2
92	FW	(Turkey) TUR	Halit Çokyaşar	1	0	0+1	0	0	0	0	0
94	MF	(Turkey) TUR	Kaan Onaran	1	0	0+1	0	0	0	0	0
96	MF	(Turkey) TUR	Mehmet Albayrak	1	0	1	0	0	0	0	0
98	MF	(Turkey) TUR	Muhammed Ergin	2	0	0+2	0	0	0	0	0
Players out on loan:
Players who left Sivasspor during the season:
16	MF	(Brazil) BRA	Pedro Henrique	30	8	24+1	8	2+1	0	2	0
24	MF	(Nigeria) NGA	Azubuike Okechukwu	15	0	4+6	0	1	0	3+1	0

=== Goal scorers ===
Place	Position	Nation	Number	Name	Süper Lig	Turkish Cup	UEFA Europa Conference League	Total
1	FW	(Mali)	9	Mustapha Yatabaré	10	2	0	12
2	MF	(Brazil)	16	Pedro Henrique	8	0	0	8
2	FW	(Nigeria)	8	Olarenwaju Kayode	6	0	2	8
4	FW	(Ivory Coast)	7	Max Gradel	3	4	0	7
5	FW	(Nigeria)	90	Leke James	2	2	2	6
6	DF	(Greece)	6	Dimitrios Goutas	5	0	0	5
6	MF	(Morocco)	76	Fayçal Fajr	5	0	0	5
8	FW	(Spain)	11	Jorge Félix	3	0	1	4
9	MF	(Turkey)	20	Kerem Kesgin	2	1	0	3
10	MF	(Norway)	23	Fredrik Ulvestad	2	0	0	2
10	DF	(Turkey)	88	Caner Osmanpaşa	1	0	1	2
10	DF	(Gabon)	4	Aaron Appindangoyé	0	2	0	2
13	MF	(Ghana)	5	Isaac Cofie	1	0	0	1
13	DF	(Turkey)	58	Ziya Erdal	1	0	0	1
13	DF	(Turkey)	77	Ahmet Oğuz	1	0	0	1
13	MF	(Turkey)	17	Erdoğan Yeşilyurt	1	0	0	1
13	MF	(Turkey)	37	Hakan Arslan	0	1	0	1
13	FW	(Senegal)	15	Moussa Konaté	0	1	0	1
13				Own goal	1	0	0	1
				TOTALS	52	13	6	71

=== Clean sheets ===
Place	Position	Nation	Number	Name	Süper Lig	Turkish Cup	UEFA Europa Conference League	Total
1	GK	(Turkey)	35	Ali Vural	5	1	2	8
2	GK	(Turkey)	25	Muammer Yıldırım	3	0	0	3
				TOTALS	8	1	2	11

=== Disciplinary record ===
Number	Nation	Position	Name	Süper Lig		Turkish Cup		UEFA Europa Conference League		Total	
Number	Nation	Position	Name	Booked	Sent off (straight red)	Booked	Sent off (straight red)	Booked	Sent off (straight red)	Booked	Sent off (straight red)
3	(Turkey)	DF	Uğur Çiftçi	6	2	0	0	2	0	8	2
4	(Gabon)	DF	Aaron Appindangoyé	1	0	0	0	0	0	1	0
5	(Ghana)	MF	Isaac Cofie	5	0	0	0	0	0	5	0
6	(Greece)	DF	Dimitrios Goutas	3	0	0	0	0	0	3	0
7	(Ivory Coast)	FW	Max Gradel	5	0	1	0	1	0	7	0
8	(Nigeria)	FW	Olarenwaju Kayode	1	1	0	0	1	0	2	1
9	(Mali)	FW	Mustapha Yatabaré	6	1	2	1	0	0	8	2
10	(Turkey)	MF	Sefa Yılmaz	1	0	1	0	1	0	3	0
11	(Spain)	FW	Jorge Félix	1	0	0	0	1	0	2	0
14	(Mali)	DF	Samba Camara	1	0	0	0	0	0	1	0
15	(Senegal)	FW	Moussa Konaté	1	0	1	0	0	0	2	0
17	(Turkey)	MF	Erdoğan Yeşilyurt	7	0	1	0	0	0	8	0
20	(Turkey)	MF	Kerem Kesgin	5	0	2	0	0	0	7	0
21	(Turkey)	DF	Koray Altınay	1	0	1	0	3	0	5	0
23	(Norway)	MF	Fredrik Ulvestad	2	0	2	0	0	0	4	0
25	(Turkey)	GK	Muammer Yıldırım	1	0	0	0	0	0	1	0
35	(Turkey)	GK	Ali Vural	2	0	0	0	1	0	3	0
37	(Turkey)	MF	Hakan Arslan	2	0	1	0	2	0	5	0
58	(Turkey)	DF	Ziya Erdal	2	0	0	0	1	0	3	0
62	(Turkey)	DF	Özkan Yiğiter	1	0	0	0	0	0	1	0
76	(Morocco)	MF	Fayçal Fajr	4	0	1	0	3	0	8	0
77	(Turkey)	DF	Ahmet Oğuz	7	0	1	0	2	0	10	0
88	(Turkey)	DF	Caner Osmanpaşa	2	0	0	0	1	0	3	0
Players away on loan:
Players who left Sivasspor during the season:
16	(Brazil)	MF	Pedro Henrique	7	1	0	0	0	0	7	1
24	(Nigeria)	MF	Azubuike Okechukwu	1	0	0	0	1	0	2	0
			TOTALS	75	5	14	1	20	0	109	6
