= 2022 Turkish Cup final =

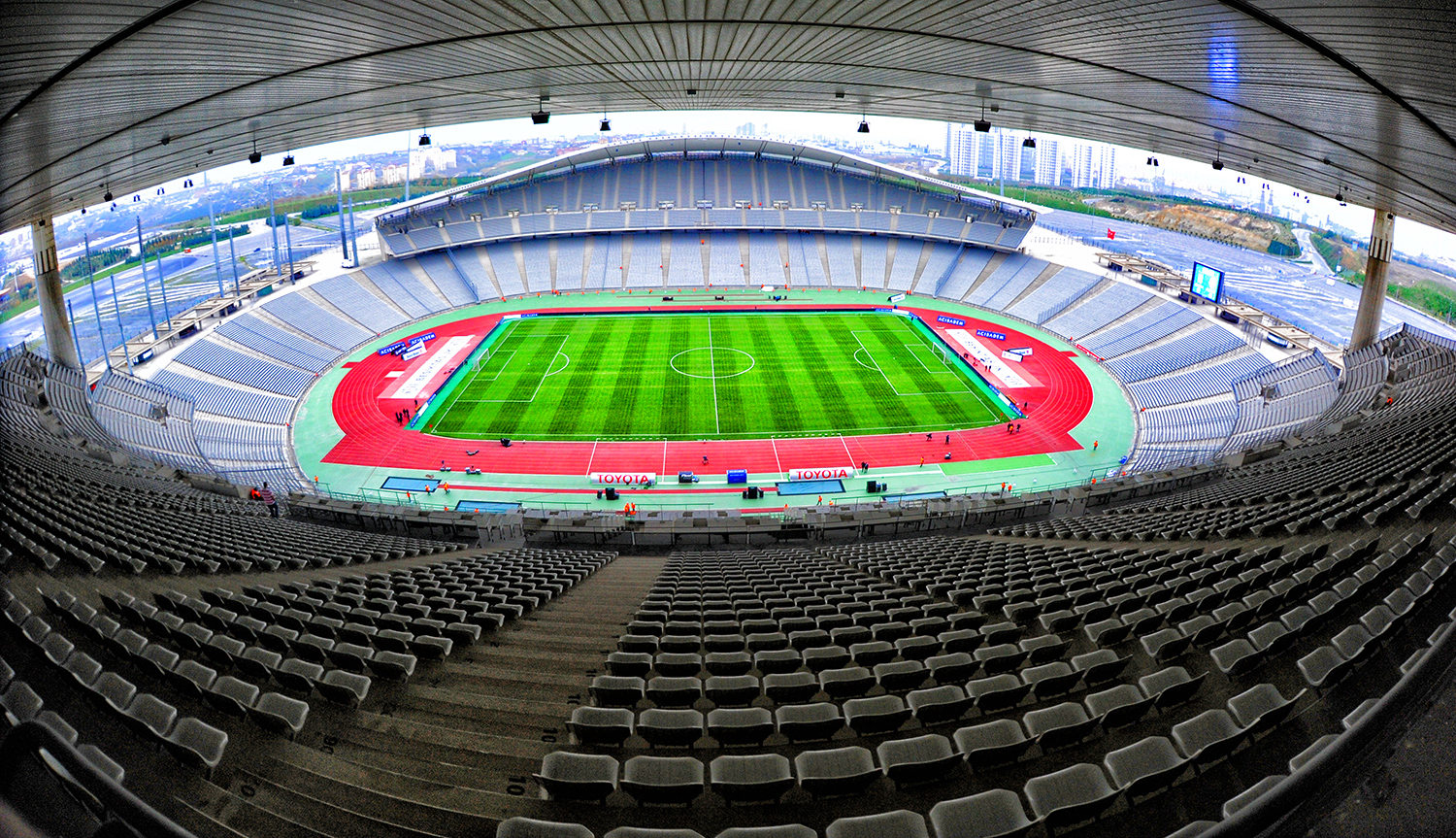
- Atatürk Olimpiyat in Istanbul hosted the final.
- Event: 2021–22 Turkish Cup
Kayserispor	Sivasspor
2	3
- After extra time
- Date: 26 May 2022
- Venue: Atatürk Olympic Stadium, Istanbul
- Referee: Halil Umut Meler
- Attendance: 27,798

The 2022 Turkish Cup final was a football match that decided the winner of the 2021–22 Turkish Cup, the 60th edition of Turkey's primary football cup. The match was played on 26 May 2022 at the Atatürk Olympic Stadium in Istanbul between Kayserispor and Sivasspor.

Sivasspor won 3–2 after extra time for their first Turkish Cup title.

== Route to the final ==
Kayserispor		Round	Sivasspor
Opponent	Result	2021–22 Turkish Cup	Opponent	Result
Artvin Hopaspor	3–0 (a.e.t.) (H)	Third round	Bye
Iğdır Futbol Kulübü	4–0 (H)	Fourth round	Bye
68 Aksaray Belediyespor	4–0 (H)	Fifth round	MKE Ankaragücü	2–1 (H)
Fenerbahçe	1–0 (A)	Round of 16	Bandırmaspor	4–2 (A)
Beşiktaş	2–1 (A)	Quarter-finals	Fatih Karagümrük	1–0 (H)
Trabzonspor	1–0 (A), 4–2 (H)	Semi-finals	Alanyaspor	1–2 (A), 1–1 (H)

Key: (H) = Home; (A) = Away

== Match ==
=== Details ===
26 May 2022
20:45 TRT

Kayserispor	2–3 (a.e.t.)	Sivasspor
Civelek 33'; Parlak 107'	Report	Appindangoyé 60'; Gradel 95'; Konaté 113'

Atatürk Olimpiyat, Istanbul
Attendance: 27,798
Referee: Halil Umut Meler

Kayserispor	Sivasspor

GK	25	(Romania) Silviu Lung
RB	27	(Turkey) Onur Bulut	(yellow card) 120+3'
CB	5	(Iran) Majid Hosseini
CB	3	(Ghana) Joseph Attamah		(substituted off) 100'
LB	21	(France) Lionel Carole	(yellow card) 74'
CM	17	(Turkey) Emrah Başsan
CM	10	(France) Olivier Kemen		(substituted on) 100'
RW	28	(Turkey) Ramazan Civelek		(substituted off) 90+3'
AM	91	(Italy) Andrea Bertolacci		(substituted off) 85'
LW	26	(Senegal) Mame Thiam (c)		(substituted off) 100'
CF	9	(Turkey) Mustafa Pektemek		(substituted off) 78'
Substitutes:
GK	25	(Netherlands) Bilal Bayazit
DF	4	(Greece) Dimitrios Kolovetsios
DF	15	(Turkey) Uğur Demirok
MF	7	(Portugal) Miguel Cardoso		(substituted on) 100'
MF	22	(Turkey) Hayrullah Erkip
MF	24	(Turkey) İbrahim Akdağ	(yellow card) 105+4'	(substituted on) 90+3'
MF	61	(Turkey) Abdulkadir Parmak		(substituted on) 100'
MF	88	(Brazil) Gustavo Campanharo		(substituted on) 85'
FW	19	(Switzerland) Mario Gavranović		(substituted on) 78'
FW	23	(Turkey) İlhan Parlak		(substituted on) 100'
Manager:
(Turkey) Hikmet Karaman

GK	35	(Turkey) Ali Şaşal Vural
RB	77	(Turkey) Ahmet Oğuz
CB	4	(Gabon) Aaron Appindangoyé
CB	88	(Turkey) Caner Osmanpaşa
LB	3	(Turkey) Uğur Çiftçi
DM	37	(Turkey) Hakan Arslan (c)
CM	23	(Norway) Fredrik Ulvestad		(substituted off) 120+4'
CM	76	(Morocco) Fayçal Fajr
RW	17	(Germany) Erdoğan Yeşilyurt	(yellow card) 97'	(substituted off) 99'
LW	7	(Ivory Coast) Max Gradel		(substituted off) 117'
CF	9	(Mali) Mustapha Yatabaré		(substituted off) 111'
Substitutes:
GK	25	(Turkey) Muammer Yıldırım
DF	6	(Greece) Dimitrios Goutas		(substituted on) 117'
DF	14	(Mali) Samba Camara
DF	58	(Turkey) Ziya Erdal
MF	5	(Ghana) Isaac Cofie
MF	20	(Turkey) Kerem Atakan Kesgin		(substituted on) 120+4'
FW	8	(Nigeria) Olarenwaju Kayode		(substituted on) 99'
FW	11	(Spain) Jorge Félix
FW	15	(Senegal) Moussa Konaté		(substituted on) 111'
Manager:
(Turkey) Rıza Çalımbay

Assistant referees:
Mustafa Emre Eyisoy
İbrahim Çağlar Uyarcan
Fourth official:
Yasin Kol
Video assistant referee:
Ali Şansalan
Assistant video assistant referees:
Bahattin Şimşek
Kerem Ersoy

Match rules

- 90 minutes
- 30 minutes of extra time if necessary
- Penalty shoot-out if scores still level
- Twelve named substitutes
- Maximum of five substitutions, with a sixth allowed in extra time (Note: Each team will be given only three opportunities to make substitutions, with a fourth opportunity in extra time, excluding substitutions made at half-time, before the start of extra time and at half-time in extra time.)
