= 2022 Turkish Super Cup =

- Event: Turkish Super Cup
| Trabzonspor | Sivasspor |
| 4 | 0 |
- Date: 30 July 2022
- Venue: Atatürk Olympic Stadium, Istanbul
- Man of the Match: Andreas Cornelius
- Referee: Mete Kalkavan
- Attendance: 46,732
- Weather: Clear

The 2022 Turkish Super Cup (Turkish: TFF Süper Kupa), or 2022 Turkcell Super Cup for sponsorship reasons, was the 49th edition of the Turkish Super Cup since its establishment as Presidential Cup in 1966, the annual Turkish football match contested by the winners of the previous season's top league and cup competitions (or cup runner-up in case the league- and cup-winning club is the same). The game was played on 30 July 2022 between Trabzonspor and Sivasspor. The venue was the Atatürk Olympic Stadium in Istanbul, Turkey.

== Teams ==
| Team | Qualification | Previous participations (bold indicates winners) |
|---|---|---|
| Trabzonspor | Winners of the 2021–22 Süper Lig | 12 (**1976**, **1977**,**1978**,**1979**,**1980**,1981, **1983**, 1984, 1992, **1995**, **2010**, **2020**) |
| Sivasspor | Winners of the 2021–22 Turkish Cup | None |

== Match ==
=== Details ===
30 July 2022
20:45 TRT

| Trabzonspor | 4–0 | Sivasspor |
|---|---|---|
| Cornelius 37', 51'; Stryger Larsen 64'; Bakasetas 76' (pen.) | Report (Note: Some players had their squad numbers changed after the match in accordance with the beginning of the league campaign, the numbers worn at the match were as according to.) |

Atatürk Olympic Stadium, Istanbul
Attendance: 46,732
Referee: Mete Kalkavan

| **Trabzonspor** | **Sivasspor** |

| GK | 1 | (Turkey) Uğurcan Çakır (c) |
| RB | 19 | (Denmark) Jens Stryger Larsen |
| CB | 8 | (Turkey) Dorukhan Toköz |
| CB | 13 | (Brazil) Vitor Hugo |
| LB | 18 | (Turkey) Eren Elmalı |
| CM | 10 | (Turkey) Abdülkadir Ömür | | (substituted off) 82' |
| CM | 17 | (Slovakia) Marek Hamšík | | (substituted off) 82' |
| CM | 11 | (Greece) Anastasios Bakasetas |
| RW | 7 | (Bosnia and Herzegovina) Edin Višća | | (substituted off) 73' |
| LW | 27 | (Egypt) Trézéguet | | (substituted off) 73' |
| CF | 14 | (Denmark) Andreas Cornelius | (yellow card) 30' | (substituted off) 58' |
Substitutes:
| GK | 54 | (Turkey) Muhammet Taha Tepe |
| DF | 24 | (Netherlands) Stefano Denswil |
| DF | 25 | (Turkey) Ahmetcan Kaplan |
| MF | 5 | (Turkey) Berat Özdemir |
| MF | 6 | (Greece) Manolis Siopis | | (substituted on) 73' |
| MF | 32 | (Turkey) Yusuf Erdoğan |
| MF | 34 | (Turkey) Doğucan Haspolat | | (substituted on) 82' |
| FW | 21 | (Cape Verde) Djaniny | | (substituted on) 58' |
| FW | 37 | (Germany) Emrehan Gedikli | (yellow card) 90+1' | (substituted on) 82' |
| FW | 77 | (Ivory Coast) Jean Evrard Kouassi | | (substituted on) 73' |
Manager:
(Turkey) Abdullah Avcı

| GK | 35 | (Turkey) Ali Şaşal Vural |
| RB | 2 | (Turkey) Murat Paluli | | (substituted off) 73' |
| CB | 4 | (Gabon) Aaron Appindangoyé | | (substituted off) 62' |
| CB | 88 | (Turkey) Caner Osmanpaşa |
| LB | 3 | (Turkey) Uğur Çiftçi |
| DM | 8 | (Germany) Robin Yalçın |
| DM | 37 | (Turkey) Hakan Arslan (c) |
| RM | 17 | (Germany) Erdoğan Yeşilyurt | | (substituted off) 82' |
| AM | 23 | (Norway) Fredrik Ulvestad |
| LM | 7 | (Ivory Coast) Max Gradel | (yellow card) 68' | (substituted off) 82' |
| CF | 9 | (Mali) Mustapha Yatabaré | | (substituted off) 62' |
Substitutes:
| GK | 25 | (Turkey) Muammer Yıldırım |
| DF | 5 | (Ghana) Isaac Cofie |
| DF | 6 | (Greece) Dimitrios Goutas | | (substituted on) 82' |
| DF | 13 | (Turkey) Alaaddin Okumuş |
| DF | 58 | (Turkey) Ziya Erdal | | (substituted on) 82' |
| MF | 20 | (Turkey) Kerem Atakan Kesgin | | (substituted on) 62' |
| MF | 62 | (Turkey) Özkan Yiğiter |
| FW | 19 | (Poland) Karol Angielski | | (substituted on) 62' |
| FW | 90 | (Nigeria) Leke James | | (substituted on) 73' |
Manager:
(Turkey) Rıza Çalımbay

Man of the Match:
Andreas Cornelius (Trabzonspor)

Assistant referees:
Kerem Ersoy
Esat Sancaktar
Fourth official:
Bahattin Şimşek
Video assistant referee:
Alper Ulusoy
Assistant video assistant referee:
Özgür Yankaya

**Match rules**

- 90 minutes
- 30 minutes of extra time if necessary
- Penalty shoot-out if scores still level
- Nine named substitutes
- Maximum of five substitutions, with a sixth allowed in extra time (Note: Each team was given only three opportunities to make substitutions, with a fourth opportunity in extra time, excluding substitutions made at half-time, before the start of extra time and at half-time in extra time.)
