= 2023–24 Sivasspor season =

Sivasspor
2023–24 season
- President: Mecnun Otyakmaz
- Head coach: Servet Çetin
- Stadium: 4 Eylül Stadium
- Süper Lig: 7th
- Turkish Cup: Round of 16
- Top goalscorer: League: Rey Manaj (18); All: Rey Manaj (22)

The 2023–24 season is Sivasspor's 57th season in existence and seventh consecutive in the Süper Lig. They are also competing in the Turkish Cup.

== Players ==
=== First-team squad ===
As of 22 August 2023

Note: Flags indicate national team as defined under FIFA eligibility rules; some limited exceptions apply. Players may hold more than one non-FIFA nationality.

No.	Pos.	Nation	Player
1	GK	TUR	Muammer Yıldırım
3	DF	TUR	Uğur Çiftçi
4	DF	GAB	Aaron Appindangoyé
5	MF	TUR	Abdulkadir Parmak
6	MF	CIV	Kader Keïta
7	FW	NGR	Ahmed Musa
8	MF	GRE	Charis Charisis
10	FW	CMR	Clinton N'Jie
11	MF	LUX	Gerson Rodrigues (on loan from Dynamo Kyiv)
14	DF	MLI	Samba Camara
15	GK	TUR	Erhan Erentürk
17	MF	TUR	Emrah Başsan
19	MF	CZE	Roman Květ (on loan from Viktoria Plzeň)
21	MF	TUR	Emre Gökay
22	MF	SRB	Armin Đerlek

No.	Pos.	Nation	Player
23	DF	TUR	Alaaddin Okumuş
24	FW	ESP	Samuel Sáiz
35	GK	TUR	Ali Şaşal Vural
37	MF	TUR	Hakan Arslan
44	DF	GRE	Achilleas Poungouras
58	DF	TUR	Ziya Erdal
69	DF	TUR	Mehmet Albayrak
72	MF	TUR	Yunus Emre Konak
76	MF	TUR	Eren Kaya
79	FW	TUR	Mert Dursun
88	DF	TUR	Caner Osmanpaşa
94	MF	TUR	Kaan Onaran
99	DF	TUR	Murat Paluli
—	FW	ALB	Rey Manaj

=== Out on loan ===
Note: Flags indicate national team as defined under FIFA eligibility rules; some limited exceptions apply. Players may hold more than one non-FIFA nationality.

No.	Pos.	Nation	Player
—	FW	TUR	Halit Çokyaşar (at Amed until 30 June 2024)
—	GK	TUR	Baver Kuçkar (at Edirnespor until 30 June 2024)
—	DF	TUR	Emirhan Tak (at Darıca Gençlerbirliği until 30 June 2024)

== Transfers ==
=== In ===
Pos.	Player	Transferred from	Fee	Date	Source
MF	(Turkey) Emrah Başsan	(Turkey) Kayserispor	Free	5 July 2023	
MF	(Turkey) Abdulkadir Parmak	(Turkey) Trabzonspor	Undisclosed	15 July 2023	
DF	(Greece) Achilleas Poungouras	(Greece) Panathinaikos	Free	11 August 2023	
MF	(Czech Republic) Roman Květ	(Czech Republic) Viktoria Plzeň	Loan	14 August 2023	
FW	(Albania) Rey Manaj		Free	22 August 2023	

=== Out ===
Pos.	Player	Transferred to	Fee	Date	Source
FW	(Mali) Mustapha Yatabaré		Free	1 July 2023	
DF	(Greece) Dimitrios Goutas	(Wales) Cardiff City	Free	5 July 2023	
DF	(Germany) Robin Yalçın	(Turkey) Eyüpspor	Free	12 July 2023	
MF	(Ivory Coast) Max Gradel	(Turkey) Gaziantep	Free	25 July 2023	
MF	(Spain) Samuel Sáiz	(Turkey) Eyüpspor	Undisclosed	16 January 2024	

== Pre-season and friendlies ==
Win Draw Loss Fixtures

13 July 2023 Friendly	Sivasspor (Turkey)	3–0	(Turkey) İstanbulspor	Sivas
16:15 UTC+3	Başsan 7'; Njié 17'; Kaya 83'	Report		Stadium: Vali Lütfullah Bilgin Tesisleri

19 July 2023 Friendly	Sivasspor (Turkey)	1–1	(Azerbaijan) Sabail	Erzurum
18:00 UTC+3	N'Jie 7'	Report	Pedro Nuno 43'	Stadium: Yüksek İrtifa Kamp Ve Merkezi 3 Nolu Saha

22 July 2023 Friendly	Sivasspor (Turkey)	1–0	(Azerbaijan) Sumgayit	Erzurum
17:00 UTC+3	N'Jie 85'	Report		Stadium: Yüksek İrtifa Kamp Ve Merkezi 3 Nolu Saha

26 July 2023 Friendly	Sivasspor (Turkey)	2–0	(Turkey) Ümraniyespor	Erzurum
17:00 UTC+3	N'Jie 15'; Başsan 56'	Report		Stadium: Yüksek İrtifa Kamp Merkezi K1 Nolu Saha

29 July 2023 Friendly	Antalyaspor (Turkey)	0–2	(Turkey) Sivasspor	Erzurum
13:00 UTC+3			N'Jie 61'; Arslan 4'

10 September 2023 Friendly	Sivasspor (Turkey)	2–1	(Turkey) Çorum
13:30 UTC+3

== Competitions ==
=== Overall record ===
Competition	First match	Last match	Starting round	Record							
Competition	First match	Last match	Starting round	Pld	W	D	L	GF	GA	GD	Win %
Süper Lig	13 August 2023	19 May 2024	Matchday 1	0	0	0	0	0	0	+0	—
Turkish Cup	TBD			0	0	0	0	0	0	+0	—
Total				0	0	0	0	0	0	+0	—

Source: Soccerway

=== Süper Lig ===
==== League table ====
Pos	Team	Pld	W	D	L	GF	GA	GD	Pts	Qualification or relegation
5	Kasımpaşa	38	16	8	14	62	65	−3	56 (Note: Kasımpaşa are ahead of Beşiktaş on head-to-head points: Kasımpaşa 2–1 Beşiktaş, Beşiktaş 1–3 Kasımpaşa.)	
6	Beşiktaş	38	16	8	14	52	47	+5	56	Qualification for the Europa League play-off round (Note: The 2023–24 Turkish Cup winners (Beşiktaş) qualify for the Europa League play-off round.)
7	Sivasspor	38	14	12	12	47	54	−7	54	
8	Alanyaspor	38	12	16	10	53	50	+3	52	
9	Rizespor	38	14	8	16	48	58	−10	50	

Source: Süper Lig
Rules for classification: 1) Points; 2) Head-to-head points; 3) Head-to-head goal difference; 4) Head-to-head goals scored; 5) Goal difference; 6) Goals scored; 7) Play-off.

==== Results summary ====
Overall								Home						Away					
Pld	W	D	L	GF	GA	GD	Pts	W	D	L	GF	GA	GD	W	D	L	GF	GA	GD
20	6	7	7	24	31	−7	25	1	6	2	9	11	−2	5	1	5	15	20	−5

Last updated: 14 January 2024.
Source: FBREF

==== Results by round ====
Round	1	2
Ground	H	
Result		
Position		

A = Away; H = Home; W = Win; D = Draw; L = Loss

==== Matches ====
The league fixtures were unveiled on 19 July 2023.

13 August 2023 1	Sivasspor	1–1	Samsunspor	Sivas
19:15 UTC+3	N'Jie 11'	Report	van Drongelen 78'	Stadium: 4 Eylül Stadium; Referee: Murat Erdoğan

20 August 2023	Gaziantep	1–3	Sivasspor	Gaziantep
21:45 TRT (UTC+3)				Stadium: Gaziantep Stadium

26 August 2023	Sivasspor	1–1	Antalyaspor	Sivas
21:45 TRT (UTC+3)				Stadium: New Sivas 4 Eylül Stadium

3 September 2023 4	Beşiktaş	2–0	Sivasspor	Beşiktaş
19:15 TRT (UTC+3)	Colley 25'; Rashica 40'	Report		Stadium: Beşiktaş Stadium; Referee: Zorbay Küçük

18 September 2023 5	Sivasspor	1–3	Ankaragücü	Sivas
20:00 TRT (UTC+3)				Stadium: New Sivas 4 Eylül Stadium

23 September 2023 6	Çaykur Rizespor	1–1	Sivasspor	Rize
18:00 TRT (UTC+3)	Varešanović (yellow card) 13' (goal) 35'; Mocsi (yellow card) 44'; Pala (yellow card) 61'; Şahin (yellow card) 64'; Topçu (yellow card) 75'; Keser (yellow card) 88'	Report	Samuel Sáiz 7'; Manaj (yellow card) 66'; Charisis (yellow card) 86'; Osmanpaşa (yellow card) 90+2'	Stadium: City of Rize Stadium; Attendance: 5,932; Referee: Burak Pakkan

28 October 2023 10	Alanyaspor	1–2	Sivasspor	Alanya
16:00 TRT	Aksoy 66'		Květ 90+3'; Manaj 90+7'	Stadium: Alanya Stadium; Referee: Mert Güzenge

4 December 2023 14	Fenerbahçe	4–1	Sivasspor	Istanbul
20:00 TRT (UTC+3)	Akaydin (yellow card) 14'; Szymański 17'; Kahveci 42'; Okumuş 68' (o.g.); Džeko 75'	Report	Manaj 50'; Charisis (yellow card) 56'	Stadium: Şükrü Saracoğlu Stadium; Attendance: 31,561; Referee: Bahattin Şimşek

11 January 2024 16	Sivasspor	1–1	Galatasaray	Sivas
17:00 TRT (UTC+3)	Koita 86' (pen.)	Report 1 Report 2 Report 3	Demirbay (yellow card) 27' (goal) 45+1'; Aktürkoğlu (yellow card) 85' (yellow-red card) 90'	Stadium: New Sivas 4 Eylül Stadium; Referee: Zorbay Küçük
Note: It was announced that the match, which was planned to be played on 16 December by the Turkish Football Federation, was postponed to a later date after the attack on referee Halil Umut Meler on 11 December.

2 February 2024 24	Ankaragücü	0–0	Sivasspor	Ankara
17:00 TRT (UTC+3)	Cephas (yellow card) 50'; Hanousek (yellow card) 89'		Poungouras (yellow card) 39'; Okumuş (yellow card) 82'	Stadium: Eryaman Stadium; Referee: Abdulkadir Bitigen

11 February 2024 25	Sivasspor	1–0	Çaykur Rizespor	Sivas
13:30 TRT (UTC+3)	Manaj 30'; Akdağ (yellow card) 58'		Topçu (yellow card) 67'	Stadium: New Sivas 4 Eylül Stadium; Referee: Emre Kargın

17 February 2024 26	Hatayspor	1–1	Sivasspor	Mersin
16:00 TRT (UTC+3)	Boudjemaa 75'		Manaj 18'	Stadium: Mersin Stadium; Referee: Ümit Öztürk

25 February 2024 27	Sivasspor	v	Pendikspor	Sivas
13:30 TRT (UTC+3)				Stadium: New Sivas 4 Eylül Stadium

1 March 2024 28	Kasımpaşa	v	Sivasspor	Istanbul
20:00 TRT (UTC+3)				Stadium: Recep Tayyip Erdoğan Stadium

9 March 2024 29	Sivasspor	v	Alanyaspor	Sivas
13:30 TRT (UTC+3)				Stadium: New Sivas 4 Eylül Stadium

16 March 2024 30	Adana Demirspor	v	Sivasspor	Adana
20:30 TRT (UTC+3)				Stadium: New Adana Stadium

3 April 2024 31	Sivasspor	v	Fatih Karagümrük	Sivas
--:-- TRT (UTC+3)				Stadium: New Sivas 4 Eylül Stadium

14 April 2024 32	Trabzonspor	v	Sivasspor	Trabzon
--:-- TRT (UTC+3)				Stadium: Papara Park

21 April 2024 33	Sivasspor	v	Fenerbahçe	Sivas
--:-- TRT (UTC+3)		Report		Stadium: New Sivas 4 Eylül Stadium

28 April 2024 34	Sivasspor	v	Konyaspor	Sivas
--:-- TRT (UTC+3)				Stadium: New Sivas 4 Eylül Stadium

5 May 2024 35	Galatasaray	v	Sivasspor	Istanbul
--:-- TRT (UTC+3)		Report		Stadium: Rams Park

12 May 2024 36	Sivasspor	v	İstanbul Başakşehir	Sivas
--:-- TRT (UTC+3)				Stadium: New Sivas 4 Eylül Stadium

19 May 2024 37	İstanbulspor	v	Sivasspor	Istanbul
--:-- TRT (UTC+3)				Stadium: Esenyurt Necmi Kadıoğlu Stadium

26 May 2024 38	Sivasspor	v	Kayserispor	Sivas
--:-- TRT (UTC+3)				Stadium: New Sivas 4 Eylül Stadium

=== Turkish Cup ===
2 November 2023 Third round	Sivasspor	4–0	Artvin Hopaspor	Sivas
13:00	Manaj 6', 35', 42'; Kaya 87'			Stadium: New Sivas 4 Eylül Stadium

7 December 2023 Fourth round	Sivasspor	2–1	Arnavutköy Belediye	Sivas
13:00	Arslan 19' (pen.); Musa 25'		Özcan 45'	Stadium: New Sivas 4 Eylül Stadium

18 January 2024 Fifth round	Sivasspor	3–2	Keçiörengücü	Sivas
13:00	Erdal 10'; Koita 51'; Manaj 82'		Dembélé 52', 65' (pen.)	Stadium: New Sivas 4 Eylül Stadium

7 February 2024 Round of 16	Sivasspor	0–1	Konyaspor	Sivas
14:30			Oğuz 109'	Stadium: New Sivas 4 Eylül Stadium
