= Samba Camara =

Malian professional footballer (born 1992)

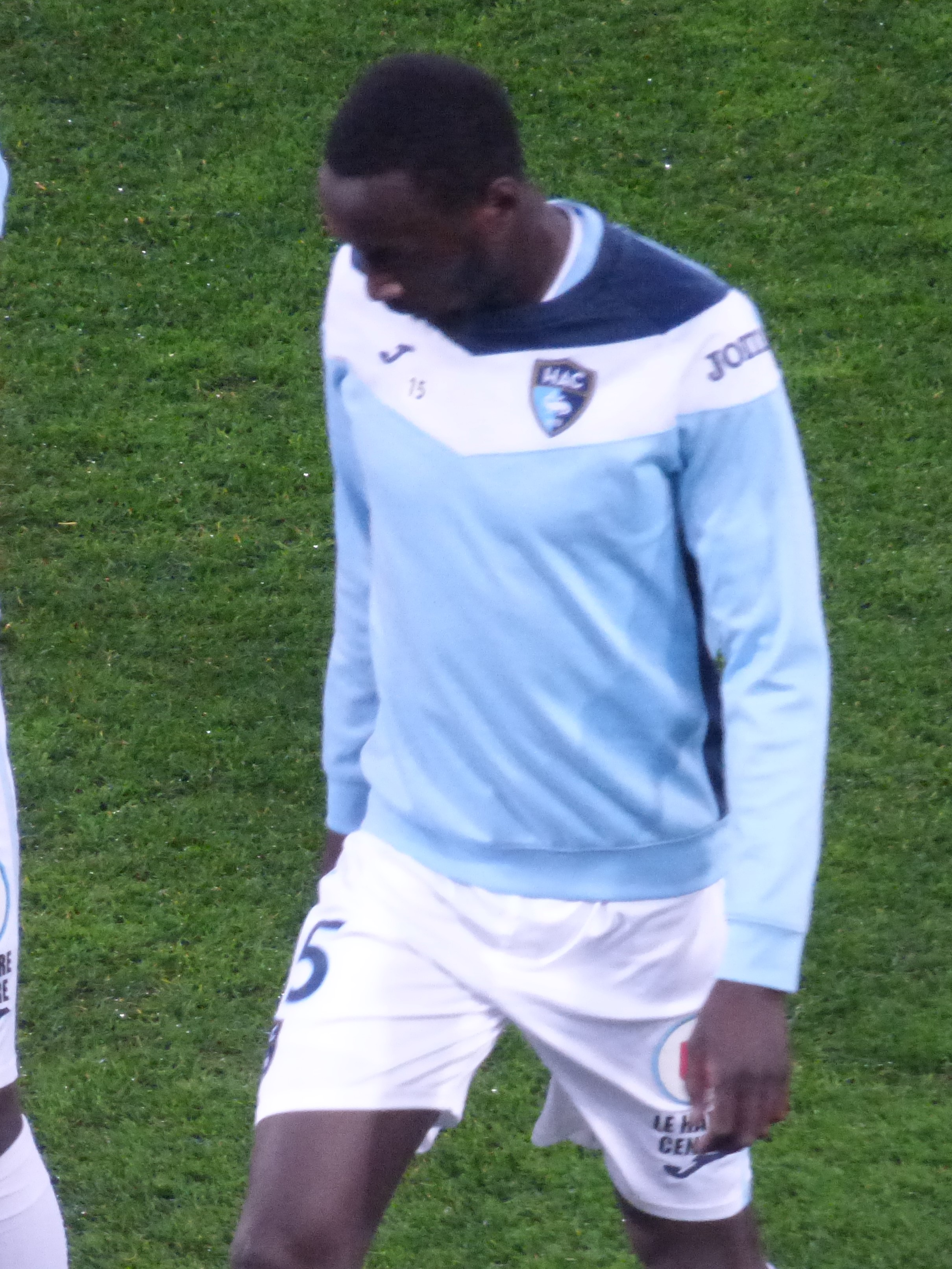
- Camara with Le Havre in 2019

Personal information
- Date of birth: 14 November 1992 (age 34)
- Place of birth: Le Havre, France
- Height: 1.92 m (6 ft 4 in)
- Position: Defender

Team information
- Current team: Al-Jandal
- Number: 14

Senior career*
Years	Team	Apps	(Gls)
2012–2013	AM Neiges Le Havre	25	(1)
2013–2017	Le Havre B	38	(0)
2016–2019	Le Havre	68	(0)
2020–2025	Sivasspor	109	(1)
2025–	Al-Jandal	12	(0)

International career^{‡}
2021	Mali	1	(0)
- * Club domestic league appearances and goals as of 16 June 2025 ‡ National team caps and goals as of 20:50, 26 May 2022 (UTC)

Samba Camara (born 14 November 1992) is a professional footballer who plays as a defender for Saudi club Al-Jandal. Born in France, he represents Mali internationally.

== Club career ==
On 23 December 2019 Camara signed with New England Revolution. On 20 January 2020 the deal became void after Camara's P-1 visa application was denied.

On 8 September 2025, Camara joined Saudi FDL club Al-Jandal.

== Career statistics ==
As of match played on 27 November 2023

Club statistics
Club	Season	League			National Cup		Continental		Other		Total	
Club	Season	Division	Apps	Goals	Apps	Goals	Apps	Goals	Apps	Goals	Apps	Goals
Le Havre	2015–16	Ligue 2	6	0	0	0	—		—		6	0
Le Havre	2016–17	Ligue 2	2	0	2	0	—		—		4	0
Le Havre	2017–18	Ligue 2	20	0	0	0	—		1 (Note: Appearance in the 2017–18 Ligue 2 play-offs)	0	21	0
Le Havre	2018–19	Ligue 2	26	0	2	1	—		3 (Note: Appearances in the Coupe de la Ligue)	0	31	1
Le Havre	2019–20	Ligue 2	14	0	1	0	—		1	0	16	0
Le Havre	Total		68	0	5	1	0	0	5	0	78	1
Le Havre B	2016–17	Championnat de France Amateur	7	0	—		—		—		7	0
Le Havre B	2017–18	Championnat National 2	2	0	—		—		—		2	0
Le Havre B	Total		9	0	0	0	0	0	0	0	9	0
Sivasspor	2019–20	Süper Lig	5	0	2	0	—		—		7	0
Sivasspor	2020–21	Süper Lig	28	0	2	0	5 (Note: Appearances in the UEFA Europa League)	0	—		35	0
Sivasspor	2021–22	Süper Lig	19	0	3	0	1 (Note: Appearance in the UEFA Europa Conference League)	0	—		23	0
Sivasspor	2022–23	Süper Lig	11	0	2	0	—		—		13	0
Sivasspor	2023–24	Süper Lig	4	0	1	0	—		—		5	0
Sivasspor	Total		67	0	10	0	6	0	0	0	83	0
Career totals			144	0	15	1	6	0	5	0	170	1

== International career ==
Born in France, Camara is Malian by descent. He made his debut for Mali national football team on 24 March 2021 in an Africa Cup of Nations qualifier against Guinea.

== Honours ==
Sivasspor

- Turkish Cup: 2021–22
