= Muhammed Emin Ergin =

Turkish footballer

Personal information
- Date of birth: 24 April 2001 (age 25)
- Place of birth: Kayseri, Turkey
- Position: Winger

Team information
- Current team: İskenderunspor
- Number: 77

Youth career
- 2012–2019: Kocasinan Şimşekspor
- 2019–2021: Sivasspor

Senior career*
Years	Team	Apps	(Gls)
2021–	Sivasspor	2	(0)
2022	→ İskenderunspor (loan)	9	(0)
2022–2023	→ Sapanca Gençlikspor (loan)	20	(1)
2023–	→ İskenderunspor (loan)	0	(0)
- * Club domestic league appearances and goals as of 1 October 2023

Muhammed Emin Ergin (born 24 April 2001) is a Turkish footballer who plays as a winger for TFF Second League club İskenderunspor on loan from Sivasspor.

== Career ==
A youth product of Kocasinan Şimşekspor, Ergin moved to Sivasspor on 9 August 2019. He made his professional debut with Sivasspor in a 4–0 Süper Lig win over Hatayspor on 28 November 2021.
