= Koray Altınay =

Turkish footballer

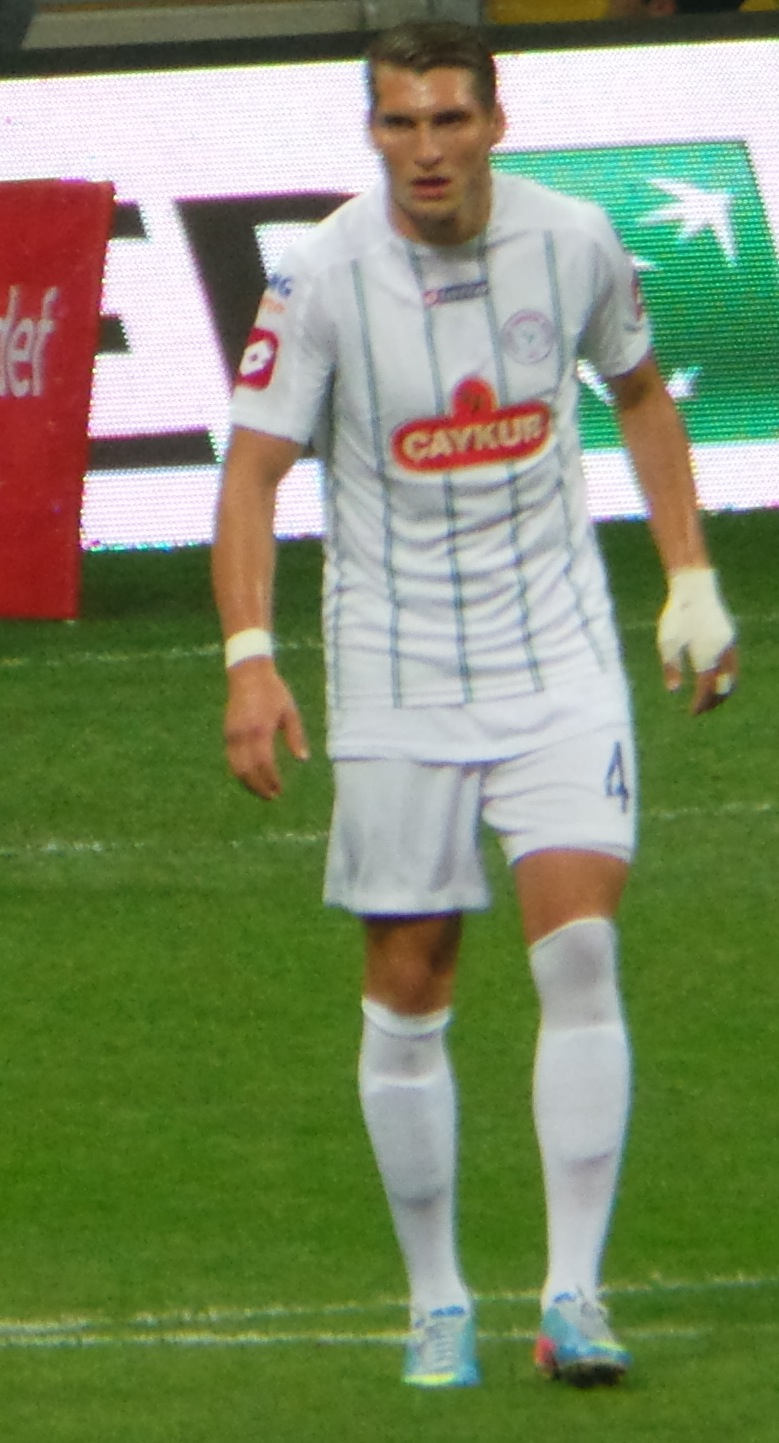
- Altınay with Çaykur Rizespor in 2013

Personal information
- Date of birth: 11 October 1991 (age 35)
- Place of birth: Munich, Germany
- Height: 1.76 m (5 ft 9 in)
- Positions: Right back; defensive midfielder

Team information
- Current team: Bucaspor 1928
- Number: 21

Youth career
- 2009–2011: SC Fürstenfeldbruck

Senior career*
Years	Team	Apps	(Gls)
2011–2012	Bayern Munich II	11	(1)
2012–2013	SSV Jahn Regensburg	14	(0)
2013–2016	Çaykur Rizespor	81	(0)
2016–2018	Osmanlıspor	12	(0)
2018–2019	Çaykur Rizespor	19	(0)
2019–2021	Fatih Karagümrük	57	(2)
2021–2022	Sivasspor	5	(0)
2022–2023	Çaykur Rizespor	22	(1)
2023–	Bucaspor 1928	0	(0)

International career^{‡}
2013	Turkey A2	1	(0)
- * Club domestic league appearances and goals as of 12 June 2023 ‡ National team caps and goals as of 21:03, 26 May 2022 (UTC)

Koray Altınay (born 11 October 1991) is a Turkish footballer who plays as a right back or defensive midfielder for TFF Second League club Bucaspor 1928.

== Career ==
Koray Altınay began his career with SC Fürstenfeldbruck before joining Bayern Munich II in 2011. He made eleven appearances for the Bayern Munich reserve team in the 2011–12 season, scoring one goal, the winner in a 1–0 victory in the mini-Munich derby against TSV 1860 München II. At the end of the season he signed for Jahn Regensburg of the 2. Bundesliga, and made his debut at this level in November 2012 as a substitute for Christian Rahn in a 3–3 draw with 1. FC Union Berlin. After Jahn were relegated from the 2. Bundesliga, Koray Altınay joined Çaykur Rizespor in July 2013.

== Honours ==
Sivasspor

- Turkish Cup: 2021–22
