= Emre Satılmış =

Turkish footballer

Personal information
- Date of birth: 13 October 1996 (age 30)
- Place of birth: Üsküdar, Turkey
- Height: 1.98 m (6 ft 6 in)
- Position: Goalkeeper

Team information
- Current team: Ankara Keçiörengücü
- Number: 18

Youth career
- 2007–2008: Yıldırımspor
- 2008–2012: Erenlerspor
- 2012–2015: Sancaktepe

Senior career*
Years	Team	Apps	(Gls)
2015–2021	Sancaktepe	64	(0)
2021–2024	Sivasspor	1	(0)
2021	→ 1461 Trabzon FK (loan)	11	(0)
2023–2024	→ 68 Aksaray Belediyespor (loan)	32	(0)
2024–	Ankara Keçiörengücü	21	(0)
- * Club domestic league appearances and goals as of 5 May 2026

Emre Satılmış (born 13 October 1996) is a Turkish semi-professional footballer who plays as a goalkeeper for TFF First League club Ankara Keçiörengücü.

== Career ==
Satılmış is a youth product of Yıldırımspor, Erenlerspor and Sancaktepe. He began his professional career with Sancaktepe in 2015, helping them earn promotion into the TFF Second League. He transferred to the Süper Lig club Sivasspor on 10 January 2022, and shortly after joined Hekimoğlu Trabzon for the rest of the 2021–22 season. Returning to Sivasspor for the 2021–22 season, he made his professional debut with them in a 2–1 Süper Lig win over Kayserispor on 22 May 2022.

== Honours ==
Sivasspor

- Turkish Cup: 2021–22
