= Alaaddin Okumuş =

Turkish footballer

Personal information
- Date of birth: 23 August 1995 (age 31)
- Place of birth: Ankara, Turkey
- Height: 1.75 m (5 ft 9 in)
- Position: Right-back

Team information
- Current team: Ankaraspor
- Number: 7

Youth career
- 2007–2012: Gençlerbirliği

Senior career*
Years	Team	Apps	(Gls)
2012–2017	Hacettepe	69	(12)
2012–2013	→ Kastamonuspor (loan)	30	(0)
2016–2017	→ Kastamonuspor (loan)	32	(2)
2017–2018	Gençlerbirliği	0	(0)
2017	→ Ankaragücü (loan)	1	(0)
2017–2018	→ Hacettepe (loan)	32	(2)
2018–2021	Ümraniyespor	66	(1)
2021–2025	Sivasspor	43	(0)
2021–2022	→ Samsunspor (loan)	18	(0)
2025–2026	Sakaryaspor	15	(0)
2026–	Ankaraspor	3	(0)

International career
2012	Turkey U17	2	(0)
- * Club domestic league appearances and goals as of 2 October 2026

Alaaddin Okumuş (born 23 August 1995) is a Turkish professional footballer who plays as a right-back for TFF 2. Lig club Ankaraspor.

== Professional career ==
A youth product of Gençlerbirliği, Okumuş began his career with Kastamonuspor on loan from Hacettepe. He returned to Gençlerbirliği, where he went on short loans to Ankaragücü and Hacettepe before transferring to Ümraniyespor in the TFF First League.

He signed a professional contract with Sivasspor on 18 January 2021. Okumuş made his professional debut with Sivasspor in a 4-1 Süper Lig win over Ankaragücü on 7 February 2021. In July 2021, Okumuş was loaned out to TFF First League club Samsunspor for the 2021-22 season.
