= New Sivas 4 September Stadium =

Stadium in Sivas, Turkey

Coordinates: 39°43′42″N 36°59′2″E

- Yeni Sivas 4 Eylül Stadyumu
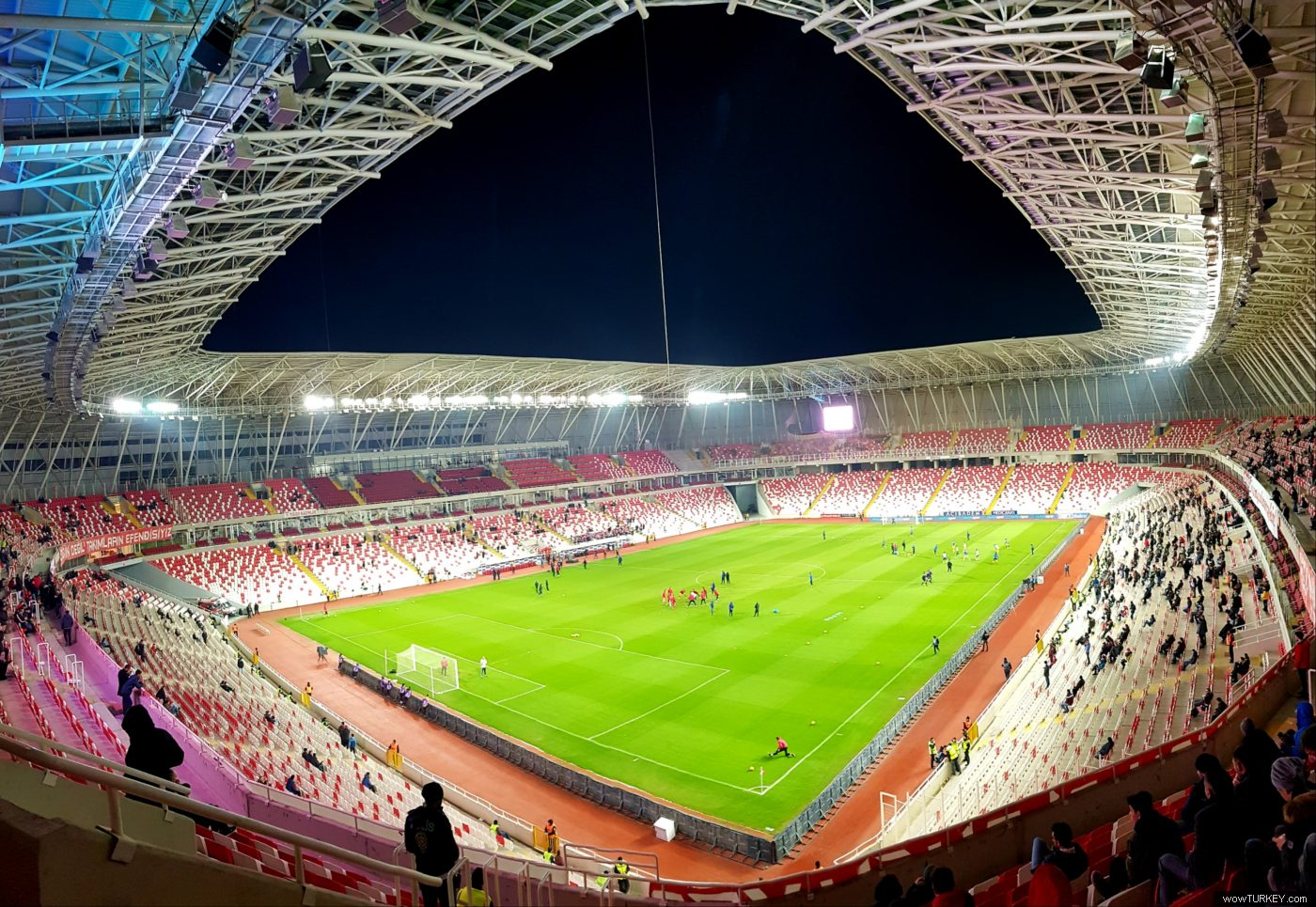

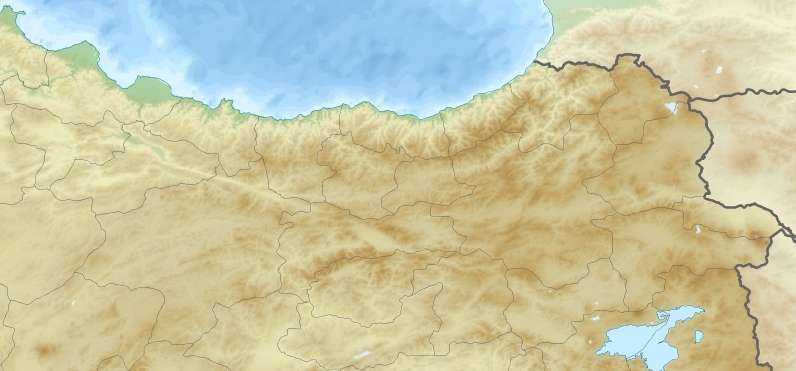
- Location in Northeastern Turkey Location in Turkey
- Full name: Sivas 4 Eylül Stadyumu
- Location: Sivas, Turkey
- Operator: Sivasspor
- Capacity: 27,734 Capacity history: 27,532 (2016–2024) 27,734 (2024–)
- Executive suites: 52
- Record attendance: 19,438 (Sivasspor–Galatasaray, 8 March 2020)

Construction
- Groundbreaking: 25 May 2013
- Built: 2013–2016
- Opened: 21 August 2016
- Cost: $20 million
- Architect: Bahadır Kul

Tenants
- Sivasspor (2016–present); Turkey national football team (selected matches)

The New Sivas 4 September Stadium (Turkish: Yeni Sivas 4 Eylül Stadyumu) is a stadium in Sivas, Turkey. It opened in 2016 and is the new home of Sivasspor of the Süper Lig. The stadium has a capacity of 27,734 spectators, and replaced the club's previous home, 4 Eylül Stadium. The new stadium is also known as 4 Eylül Stadium.
