= Emrah Başsan =

Turkish footballer

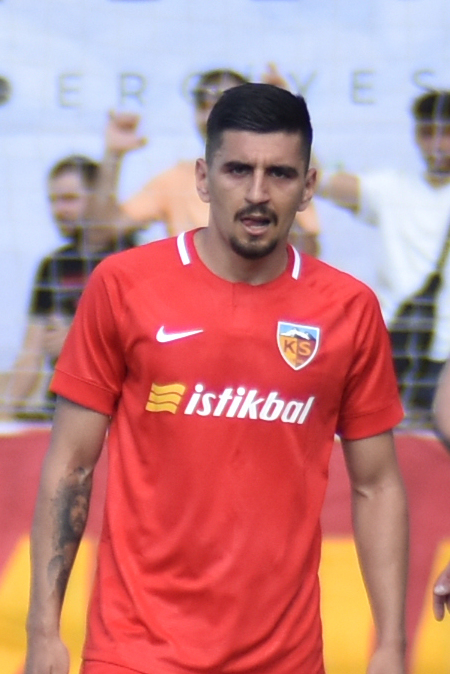
- Başsan in 2021

Personal information
- Date of birth: 17 April 1992 (age 34)
- Place of birth: Gebze, Turkey
- Height: 1.77 m (5 ft 10 in)
- Position: Winger

Team information
- Current team: Pendikspor
- Number: 7

Youth career
- Dolayoba
- Pendikspor

Senior career*
Years	Team	Apps	(Gls)
2009–2011	Pendikspor	24	(6)
2011–2016	Antalyaspor	138	(22)
2016–2018	Galatasaray	0	(0)
2016	→ Çaykur Rizespor (loan)	12	(1)
2017	→ Fortuna Sittard (loan)	15	(7)
2018	Vitória Setúbal	6	(1)
2018–2021	BB Erzurumspor	97	(13)
2021–2023	Kayserispor	57	(7)
2023–2025	Sivasspor	44	(2)
2025–2026	Amedspor	17	(1)
2026–	Pendikspor	5	(2)

International career^{‡}
2010	Turkey U18	2	(0)
2012–2015	Turkey U21	14	(2)
- * Club domestic league appearances and goals as of 13 October 2026 ‡ National team caps and goals as of 12:02, 10 January 2014 (UTC)

Emrah Başsan (born 17 April 1992) is a Turkish professional footballer who plays as a winger for TFF 1. Lig club Pendikspor.
