= Özkan Yiğiter =

Turkish footballer

Personal information
- Date of birth: 7 January 2000 (age 26)
- Place of birth: Sivas, Turkey
- Height: 1.90 m (6 ft 3 in)
- Position: Centre-back

Team information
- Current team: Vanspor
- Number: 58

Youth career
- 2012–2018: Sivas Yolspor
- 2018–2020: Sivasspor

Senior career*
| Years | Team | Apps | (Gls) |
| 2020–2026 | Sivasspor | 37 | (0) |
| 2020–2021 | → Kırıkkalespor (loan) | 28 | (0) |
| 2023 | → Gençlerbirliği (loan) | 3 | (0) |
| 2023–2024 | → 24 Erzincanspor (loan) | 34 | (0) |
| 2025 | → Vanspor (loan) | 12 | (0) |
| 2026– | Vanspor | 11 | (0) |
- * Club domestic league appearances and goals as of 7 November 2026

Özkan Yiğiter (born 7 January 2000) is a Turkish footballer who plays as a centre-back for TFF 1. Lig club Vanspor.

== Career ==
A youth product of Sivas Yolspor and Sivasspor, Yiğiter signed his first contract with Sivsspor in 2020. He spent the 2020-21 season on loan with Kırıkkalespor in the TFF Third League. He made his professional debut with Sivasspor in a 5–0 UEFA Europa Conference League loss to F.C. Copenhagen on 26 August 2021.

On 12 January 2023, Yiğiter joined Gençlerbirliği on loan.

== Honours ==
Sivasspor

- Turkish Cup: 2021–22
