= Aaron Appindangoyé =

Gabonese footballer (born 1992)

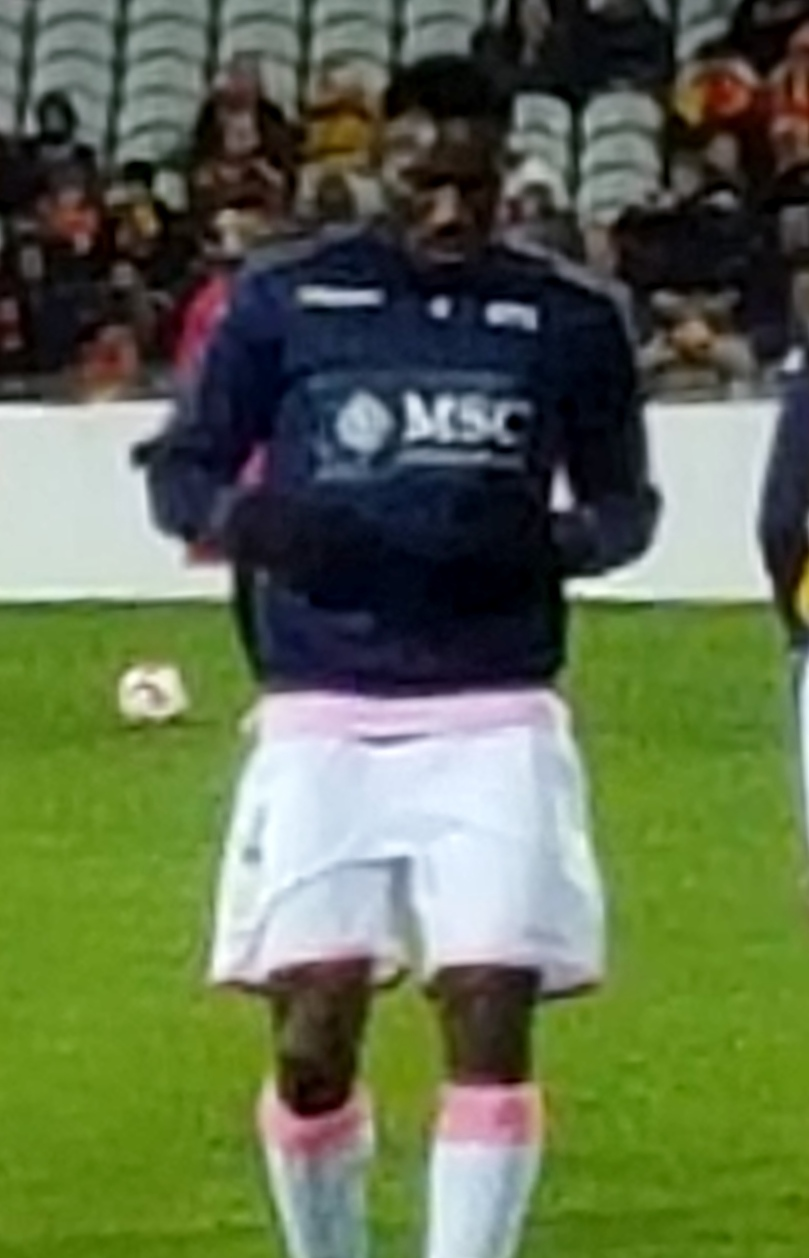
- Appindangoyé with Evian TG in 2016

Personal information
- Full name: Aaron Christopher Billy Ondélé Appindangoyé
- Date of birth: 20 February 1992 (age 34)
- Place of birth: Franceville, Gabon
- Height: 1.84 m (6 ft 0 in)
- Position: Centre back

Team information
- Current team: Sivasspor
- Number: 2

Senior career*
Years	Team	Apps	(Gls)
2010–2015	Mounana		
2015	→ Boavista (loan)	9	(0)
2015–2016	→ Evian TG (loan)	29	(0)
2016–2017	Laval	20	(1)
2017–2019	Ümraniyespor	57	(0)
2019–2024	Sivasspor	100	(2)
2024–2025	Kocaelispor	36	(1)
2025–	Sivasspor	29	(2)

International career^{‡}
2012–	Gabon	73	(2)
- * Club domestic league appearances and goals as of 6 May 2026 ‡ National team caps and goals as of 14 November 2025

Aaron Christopher Billy Ondélé Appindangoyé (born 20 February 1992) is a Gabonese professional footballer who plays as a central defender for Turkish TFF 1. Lig club Sivasspor.

== Club career ==
Appindangoyé began his European career after playing for CF Mounana in Gabon, joining Boavista on loan in 2015. On 11 August of the same year, he signed for Évian Thonon Gaillard, who had been relegated to Ligue 2. Unlike his experience at Boavista, he established himself as a regular defender at Évian, although he was unable to prevent the club's relegation. He subsequently remained in Ligue 2, joining Stade Lavallois. During the 2016–17 season, he made 20 league appearances and scored one goal.

In 2017, Appindangoyé joined Turkish club Ümraniyespor. He moved to Sivasspor in 2019, where he established himself as a regular defender. In 2022, he helped Sivasspor win the Turkish Cup. Between 2019 and 2024, he made 100 league appearances and scored two goals for the club.

Appindangoyé joined Kocaelispor in 2024 and helped the club secure promotion to the Süper Lig. In September 2025, he returned to Sivasspor, making 29 league appearances and scoring two goals during the 2025–26 season. In July 2026, he signed a two-year contract extension with Sivasspor.

== International career ==
Appindangoyé was first called up to the Gabon national team in 2012 and has remained a regular member of the squad since then. He was selected for Gabon's squad for the 2014 African Nations Championship, featuring in the final tournament and playing alongside teammates such as Pierre-Emerick Aubameyang.

Appindangoyé appeared in Gabon's group-stage matches against the Republic of the Congo and the Equatorial Guinea at the 2015 Africa Cup of Nations.

At the 2017 Africa Cup of Nations, he started all three of Gabon's group-stage matches and played the full 90 minutes in each game.

Appindangoyé was included in Gabon's final squad for the 2025 Africa Cup of Nations, but did not feature in the group-stage matches against the Cameroon, Mozambique, or Ivory Coast national teams.

== Career statistics ==
=== Club ===
As of match played 1 November 2025

Appearances and goals by club, season and competition
Club	Season	League			National cup		League cup		Continental		Other		Total	
Club	Season	Division	Apps	Goals	Apps	Goals	Apps	Goals	Apps	Goals	Apps	Goals	Apps	Goals
Mounana	2010–11	Gabon Championnat National D1	—		—		—		—		—		—	
Boavista (loan)	2014–15	Primeira Liga	9	0	—		—		—		—		9	0
Evian TG (loan)	2015–16	Ligue 2	29	0	2	0	2	1	—		—		33	1
Laval	2016–17	Ligue 2	20	1	0	0	1	0	—		—		21	1
Ümraniyespor	2017–18	TFF 1. Lig	28	0	—		—		—		—		28	0
Ümraniyespor	2018–19	TFF 1. Lig	29	0	5	0	—		—		—		34	0
Ümraniyespor	Total		57	0	5	0	—		—		—		62	0
Sivasspor	2019–20	Süper Lig	34	0	5	0	—		—		—		39	0
Sivasspor	2020–21	Süper Lig	13	0	2	0	—		3 (Note: Appearances in UEFA Europa League)	0	—		18	0
Sivasspor	2021–22	Süper Lig	4	0	5	2	—		—		—		9	2
Sivasspor	2022–23	Süper Lig	18	0	0	0	—		7 (Note: One appearance in UEFA Europa League, six appearances in UEFA Conference League)	0	1 (Note: Appearance in Turkish Super Cup)	0	26	0
Sivasspor	2023–24	Süper Lig	31	1	1	0	—		—		—		32	1
Sivasspor	Total		100	1	13	2	—		10	0	1	0	124	3
Kocaelispor	2024–25	TFF 1. Lig	32	1	—		—		—		—		32	1
Kocaelispor	2025–26	Süper Lig	4	0	0	0	—		—		—		4	0
Kocaelispor	Total		36	1	0	0	—		—		—		36	1
Sivasspor	2025–26	TFF 1. Lig	8	0	—		—		—		—		8	0
Career total			259	3	20	2	3	1	10	0	1	0	293	6

=== International ===
As of match played 14 November 2025

Appearances and goals by national team and year
National team	Year	Apps	Goals
Gabon	2012	1	0
Gabon	2013	8	0
Gabon	2014	8	1
Gabon	2015	12	0
Gabon	2016	6	0
Gabon	2017	9	0
Gabon	2018	6	1
Gabon	2019	4	0
Gabon	2022	3	0
Gabon	2023	5	0
Gabon	2024	8	0
Gabon	2025	4	0
Total		74	2

Scores and results list Gabon's goal tally first.

No.	Date	Venue	Opponent	Score	Result	Competition
1.	22 January 2014	Free State Stadium, Bloemfontein, South Africa	Mauritania	2–2	4–2	2014 African Nations Championship
2.	12 October 2018	Stade d'Angondjé, Libreville, Gabon	South Sudan	2–0	3–0	2019 Africa Cup of Nations qualification

== Honours ==
Sivasspor

- Turkish Cup: 2021–22
