= Ahmet Oğuz =

Turkish footballer (born 1993)

Personal information
- Date of birth: 16 January 1993 (age 33)
- Place of birth: Sorgun, Turkey
- Height: 1.76 m (5 ft 9 in)
- Positions: Right back; midfielder

Team information
- Current team: Konyaspor
- Number: 2

Youth career
- 2004–2007: Gençlerbirliği
- 2007–2010: Hacettepe
- 2010–2012: Gençlerbirliği

Senior career*
Years	Team	Apps	(Gls)
2012–2014	Hacettepe	61	(1)
2014–2020	Gençlerbirliği	143	(4)
2020–2021	Kasımpaşa	6	(0)
2021–2022	Sivasspor	45	(1)
2022–2024	Konyaspor	62	(1)
2024–2026	Kocaelispor	62	(0)
2026–	Konyaspor	0	(0)
- * Club domestic league appearances and goals as of 17 October 2026

Ahmet Oğuz (born 16 January 1993) is a Turkish professional footballer who plays as a midfielder for Süper Lig club Konyaspor.

== Career ==
=== Club career ===
Oğuz is a youth product of Gençlerbirliği and Hacettepe, and began his senior career with the latter in 2012. He moved back to Gençlerbirliği in 2014, where he made his debut in the Süper Lig. After 6 years with the club, Oğuz transferred to Kasımpaşa in 2020. He transferred to Sivasspor on 11 January 2022. He was a starter for Sivasspor in the 2021–22 Turkish Cup final, a 3–2 win over Kayserispor on 26 May 2022 that earned the club their first top flight trophy.

On 1 June 2022, Oğuz signed a two-year contract with Konyaspor.

== International career ==
Oğuz was called up to the Turkey national football team for World Cup qualifiers against Croatia in September 2016.

== Honours ==
Sivasspor

- Turkish Cup: 2021–22
