= Erdoğan Yeşilyurt =

German footballer

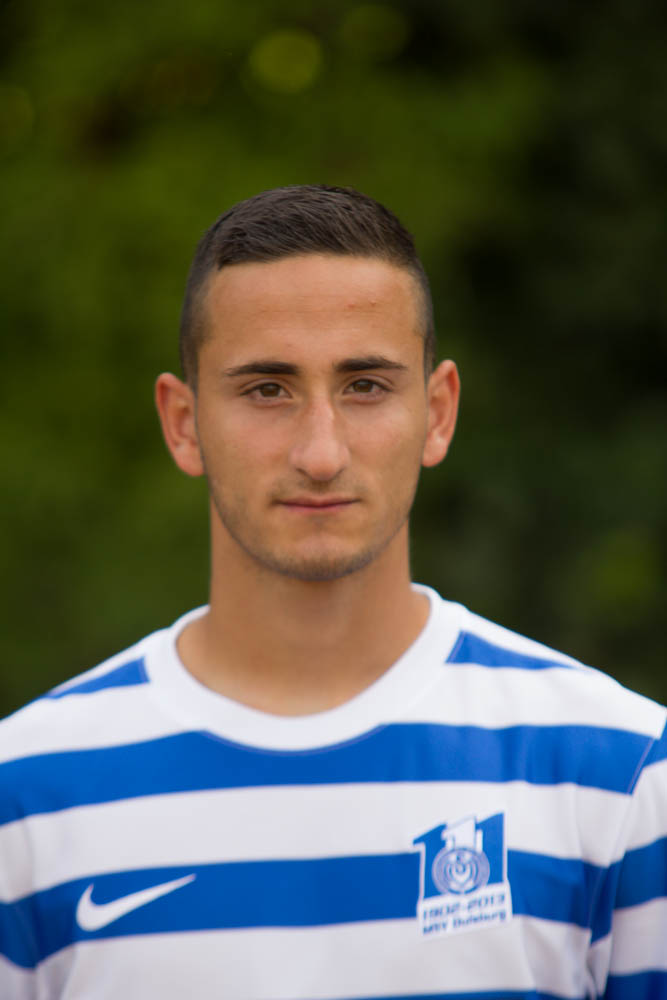
- Yeşilyurt with MSV Duisburg in 2013

Personal information
- Date of birth: 6 November 1993 (age 33)
- Place of birth: Euskirchen, Germany
- Height: 1.75 m (5 ft 9 in)
- Position: Left winger

Team information
- Current team: Antalyaspor
- Number: 17

Youth career
- –2010: TSC Euskirchen
- 2010–2012: Bonner SC

Senior career*
Years	Team	Apps	(Gls)
2012–2013	Arminia Bielefeld	2	(0)
2013	→ Eintracht Trier (loan)	16	(0)
2013–2014	MSV Duisburg	13	(1)
2014–2018	Altınordu	106	(19)
2018–2023	Sivasspor	139	(12)
2023–	Antalyaspor	53	(3)
- * Club domestic league appearances and goals as of 10 June 2026

Erdoğan Yeşilyurt (born 6 November 1993) is a German professional footballer who plays as a left winger for Antalyaspor.

== Career ==
Yeşilyurt is a youth product of the German sides TSC Euskirchen and Bonner SC. He began his senior career with Arminia Bielefeld in the 3. Liga in 2012, before going on loan to Eintracht Trier in 2013. In the summer of 2013, he transferred to MSV Duisburg, before moving to Turkey with Altınordu in 2014.

On 19 June 2018, Yeşilyurt transferred to the Süper Lig club Sivasspor.

== Personal life ==
Born in Germany, Yeşilyurt is of Turkish descent.

== Honours ==
Sivasspor

- Turkish Cup: 2021–22
