= Isaac Cofie =

Ghanaian professional footballer

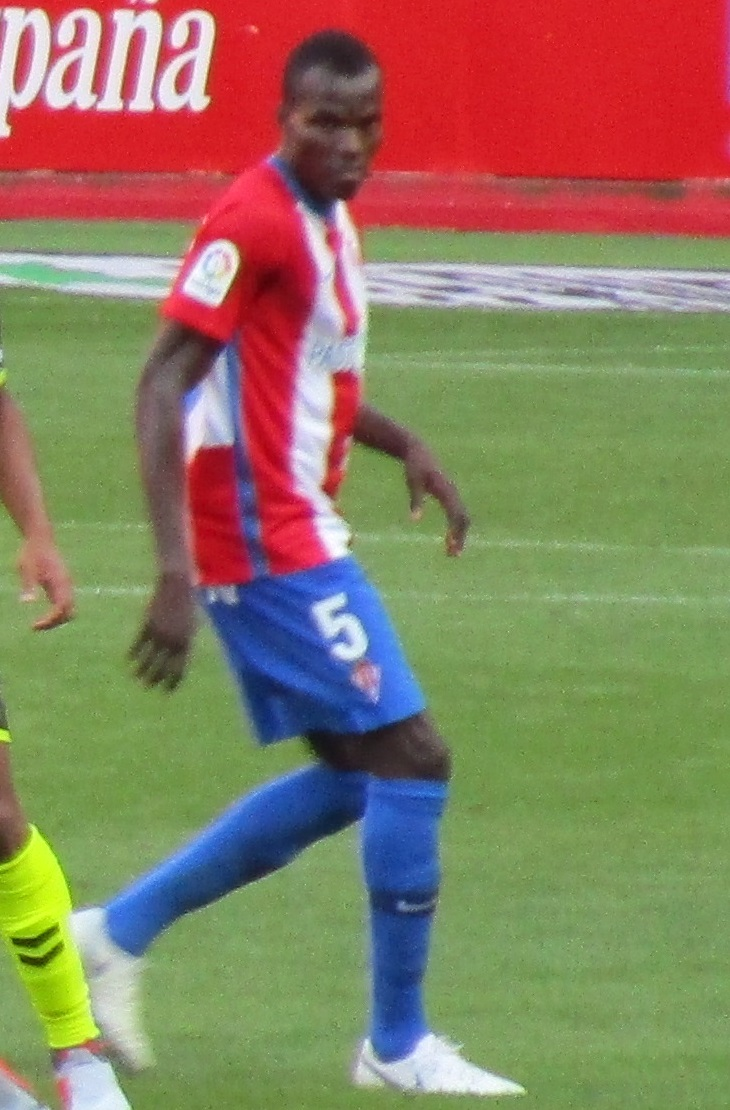
- Cofie, playing for Sporting Gijón in 2018

Personal information
- Date of birth: 20 September 1991 (age 35)
- Place of birth: Accra, Ghana
- Height: 1.84 m (6 ft 0 in)
- Position: Midfielder

Youth career
- 2008–2010: Genoa

Senior career*
Years	Team	Apps	(Gls)
2010–2012	Genoa	1	(0)
2010–2011	→ Torino (loan)	1	(0)
2011	→ Piacenza (loan)	21	(1)
2011–2012	→ Sassuolo (loan)	36	(1)
2012–2013	Chievo	27	(2)
2013–2018	Genoa	27	(1)
2014–2015	→ Chievo (loan)	18	(0)
2015–2016	→ Carpi (loan)	29	(0)
2018–2019	Sporting Gijón	25	(1)
2019–2023	Sivasspor	85	(3)
2023–2024	Ümraniyespor	18	(0)

International career^{‡}
2012	Ghana	1	(0)
- * Club domestic league appearances and goals as of 10 May 2024 ‡ National team caps and goals as of 20:46, 26 May 2022 (UTC)

Isaac Cofie (born 20 September 1991) is a Ghanaian professional footballer who plays as a midfielder.

== Club career ==
=== Genoa ===
Cofie made his Serie A debut for Genoa C.F.C. on 2 May 2010, when he came on as a substitute in the 64th minute for Alberto Zapater in a game against A.S. Bari.

==== Torino (loan) ====
Cofie joined Torino on loan in the 2010–11 Serie B season.

==== Piacenza (loan) ====
On 4 January 2011, Cofie's loan to Torino from Genoa CFC was pre-matured. Cofie played for Piacenza until the end of the 2010–11 Serie B season.

==== Sassuolo (loan) ====
Cofie then joined Sassuolo on loan for the 2011–12 Serie B season, where he helped Sassuolo to reach the 2011–12 Serie B promotion play-offs, but they lost 3–2 on aggregate to UC Sampdoria over a two-legged tie.

=== Chievo ===
In July 2012, Cofie signed a contract with Serie A club Chievo Verona in co-ownership deal, for €1.5 million transfer fee. On 6 January 2013, he scored his first goal for Chievo against Atalanta (Serie A round 19). in June 2013 Genoa bought back Cofie for €5 million, in cash plus player deal (€1.5M cash plus Dejan Lazarević)

=== Return to Genoa ===
Cofie played 17 games in 2013–14 Serie A season for Genoa.

==== Return to Cheivo ====
On 28 August 2014, Cofie was signed by A.C. Chievo Verona in a temporary deal.

=== Sporting Gijón ===
On 7 August 2018, Cofie moved to Spain for signing a two-year contract with Segunda División team Sporting de Gijón.

=== Sivasspor ===
In July 2019, he moved to Turkish side Sivasspor. On 2 July 2021, Cofie signed a two-year contract extension with the club.

== International career ==
Cofie made his debut with the Ghana national team on 8 September 2012.

== Honours ==
Sivasspor

- Turkish Cup: 2021–22
