= İbrahim Akdağ =

Turkish association football player

Personal information
- Date of birth: 21 June 1991 (age 35)
- Place of birth: Fatih, Turkey
- Height: 1.79 m (5 ft 10 in)
- Position: Midfielder

Team information
- Current team: Ankara Keçiörengücü
- Number: 14

Youth career
- 2002–2006: İstanbul Belediyespor
- 2006–2011: İstanbul Başakşehir

Senior career*
Years	Team	Apps	(Gls)
2011–2014	İstanbul Başakşehir	0	(0)
2011	→ Gölbaşıspor (loan)	10	(0)
2011–2012	→ Ümraniyespor (loan)	3	(0)
2012–2014	→ Darıca Gençlerbirliği (loan)	58	(6)
2014–2018	Ümraniyespor	108	(26)
2018–2021	BB Erzurumspor	70	(5)
2021	Ankaragücü	18	(2)
2021–2022	Kayserispor	32	(1)
2022–2023	Eyüpspor	27	(1)
2023–2024	Pendikspor	14	(0)
2024	Sivasspor	11	(0)
2024–2025	Pendikspor	14	(1)
2025	Iğdır	5	(0)
2025–	Ankara Keçiörengücü	34	(1)
- * Club domestic league appearances and goals as of 5 May 2026

İbrahim Akdağ (born 21 July 1991) is a Turkish professional footballer who plays as a midfielder for TFF 1. Lig club Ankara Keçiörengücü.

== Professional career ==
Akdağ is from the youth academy of İstanbul Başakşehir and spent his early career on loan with various clubs in the lower divisions of Turkey. He joined Ümraniyespor, and in his final 2 seasons was one of the team's top scorers dispute playing midfield.

He joined Erzurumspor in 2018, and made his professional debut with them in a 0–0 Süper Lig tie with Çaykur Rizespor on 24 August 2018.
