= Dimitrios Goutas =

Greek footballer (born 1994)

Dimitris Goutas
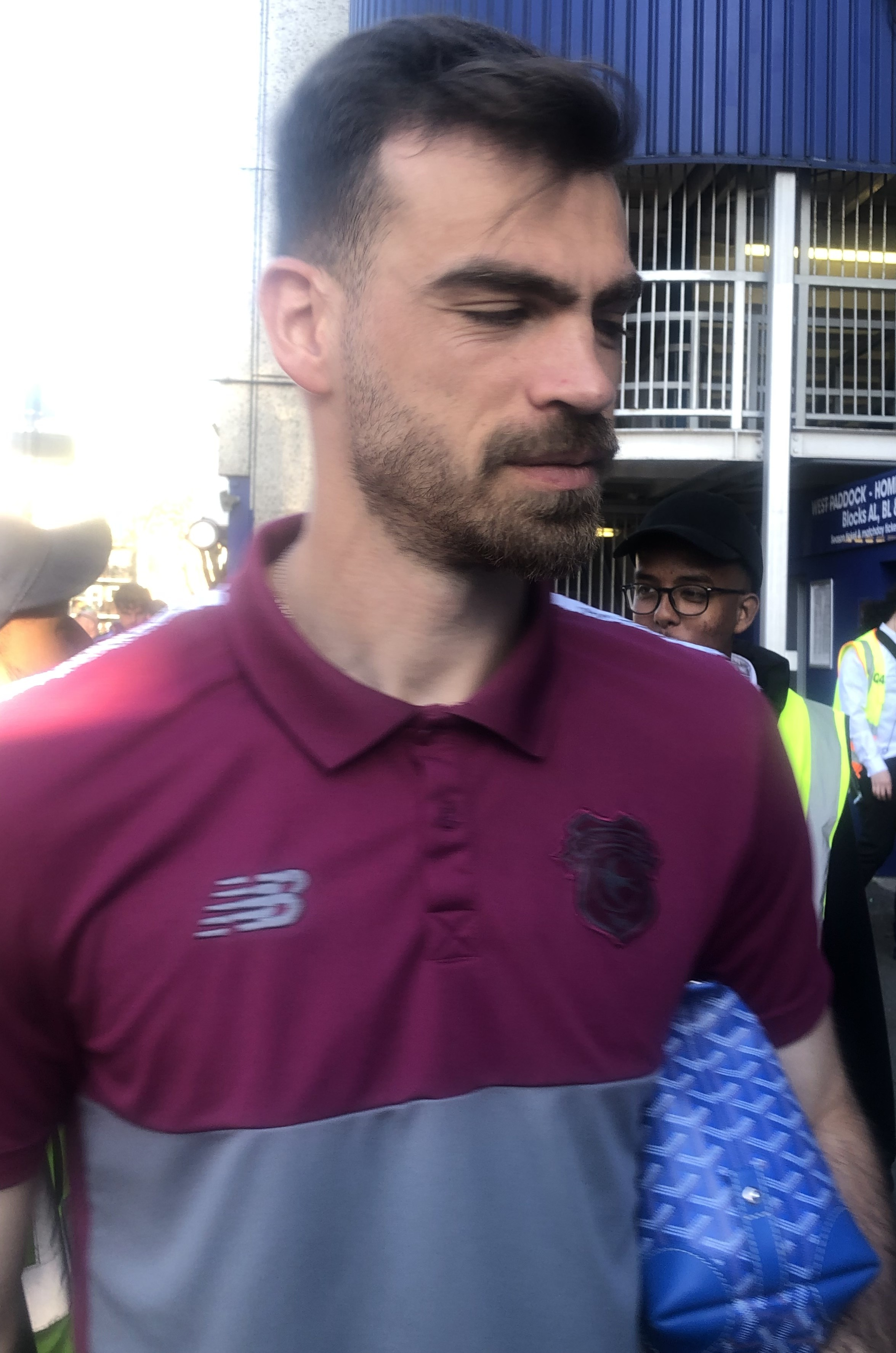
- Goutas in 2025

Personal information
- Full name: Dimitrios Goutas
- Date of birth: 4 April 1994 (age 32)
- Place of birth: Kavala, Greece
- Height: 1.93 m (6 ft 4 in)
- Position: Centre-back

Team information
- Current team: Gençlerbirliği
- Number: 6

Senior career*
Years	Team	Apps	(Gls)
2012–2015	Xanthi	77	(8)
2015–2019	Olympiacos	0	(0)
2016	→ Xanthi (loan)	7	(0)
2016–2017	→ Kortrijk (loan)	26	(0)
2017–2018	→ Sint-Truiden (loan)	21	(1)
2018–2019	→ Lech Poznań (loan)	9	(0)
2019	→ Lech Poznań II (loan)	3	(1)
2019–2021	Atromitos	62	(4)
2021–2023	Sivasspor	63	(5)
2023–2025	Cardiff City	80	(5)
2025–	Gençlerbirliği	34	(3)

International career^{‡}
2012	Greece U18	3	(0)
2012–2013	Greece U19	10	(3)
2013	Greece U20	1	(0)
2013–2016	Greece U21	5	(0)
2021–2022	Greece	3	(0)
- * Club domestic league appearances and goals as of 16 August 2026 ‡ National team caps and goals as of 14 November 2025

Dimitrios Goutas (Greek: Δημήτριος Γούτας; born 4 April 1994) is a Greek professional footballer who plays as a centre-back for Süper Lig club Gençlerbirliği.

== Club career ==
=== Xanthi ===
After moving up through the academy system at Skoda Xanthi, Goutas made his first team debut on 28 October 2012, in a 0–0 away draw against Veria. On 9 December 2012, he scored his first professional goal, in a 4–0 home win Panionios. On 13 March 2013, Goutas scored his second goal, in a 2–0 away win against Panthrakikos.

=== Olympiacos ===
On 17 July 2015, Goutas signed for Olympiacos, for a fee of €800,000 and a 30% of his next transfer's value.

==== Loan moves ====
On 23 December 2015, Goutas returned to his former club Xanthi on loan until the end of season. On 22 August 2016, Goutas signed for Belgian club Kortrijk on a 12-month loan deal. On 17 September 2016, he made his debut at the club as a starter in a 2–1 away loss against Zulte Waregem. On 8 August 2017, Goutas joined Sint-Truiden on a 12-month loan transfer, playing for second consecutive year in Belgian First Division A. On 26 October 2017, he scored his first goal with the club, sealing a victory against Royal Excel Mouscron. On 28 August 2018, Goutas signed for Polish club Lech Poznań, on a season-long loan.

=== Atromitos ===
On 24 June 2019, Goutas ended his contract with Olympiacos. Two days later he signed with Peristeri club Atromitos on a two-year contract for an undisclosed fee. His first goal came in a 2–2 away draw against Lamia on 1 September 2019. On 27 September 2020, he scored with a header in stoppage time, to give his team an important 2–2 away draw against OFI.

On 8 June 2021, Atromitos announced his departure from the club.

=== Sivasspor ===
On 16 July 2021, Goutas signed for Turkish club Sivasspor, signing a two-year contract for an undisclosed fee. It was reported that he was previously close to signing with another Turkish club, Göztepe. On 29 August 2021, Goutas made his Süper Lig debut, scoring a brace to help his team seal a 2–2 home draw with Göztepe. He was voted man of the match for his performance. On 5 February 2022, he scored the only goal in a devastating 5–1 away loss again Gaziantep

=== Cardiff City ===
On 5 July 2023, after Goutas' contract with Sivasspor expired, he signed a two-year deal with Cardiff City.

=== Gençlerbirliği ===
On 11 July 2025, Goutas moved to Turkish club Gençlerbirliği on a free transfer, signing a two-year contract.

== International career ==
Goutas made his debut with Greece national football team in a World Cup qualification home match against Spain on 11 November 2021, in which Greece lost 1–0.

== Career statistics ==
=== Club ===
As of 8 April 2025

Appearances and goals by club, season and competition
Club	Season	League			National cup (Note: Includes Greek Cup, Belgian Cup, Polish Cup, Turkish Cup, FA Cup)		League cup (Note: Includes EFL Cup)		Continental		Other		Total	
Club	Season	Division	Apps	Goals	Apps	Goals	Apps	Goals	Apps	Goals	Apps	Goals	Apps	Goals
Xanthi	2012–13	Super League Greece	22	2	2	0	—		—		—		24	2
Xanthi	2013–14	Super League Greece	32	4	2	0	—		4 (Note: Appearances in UEFA Europa League)	0	—		38	4
Xanthi	2014–15	Super League Greece	23	2	10	0	—		—		—		33	2
Xanthi	Total		77	8	14	0	—		4	0	—		95	8
Xanthi (loan)	2015–16	Super League Greece	7	0	0	0	—		—		—		7	0
Kortrijk (loan)	2016–17	Belgian Pro League	26	0	3	0	—		—		—		29	0
Sint-Truiden (loan)	2017–18	Belgian Pro League	21	1	2	1	—		—		—		23	2
Lech Poznań (loan)	2018–19	Ekstraklasa	9	0	2	0	—		—		—		11	0
Lech Poznań II (loan)	2018–19	III liga, gr. II	3	1	—		—		—		—		3	1
Atromitos	2019–20	Super League Greece	30	1	4	1	—		4	0	—		38	2
Atromitos	2020–21	Super League Greece	32	3	2	1	—		—		—		34	4
Atromitos	Total		62	4	6	2	—		4	0	—		72	6
Sivasspor	2021–22	Süper Lig	32	5	3	0	—		3 (Note: Appearances in UEFA Europa Conference League)	0	—		38	5
Sivasspor	2022–23	Süper Lig	31	0	4	0	—		10 (Note: Two appearances in UEFA Europa League, eight appearances in UEFA Europa Conference League)	0	1 (Note: Appearance in Turkish Super Cup)	0	46	0
Sivasspor	Total		63	5	7	0	—		13	0	1	0	74	5
Cardiff City	2023–24	Championship	46	4	0	0	0	0	—		—		46	4
Cardiff City	2024–25	Championship	34	1	1	0	1	0	—		—		36	1
Cardiff City	Total		80	5	1	0	1	0	—		—		82	5
Career total			348	24	35	3	1	0	21	0	1	0	406	28

=== International ===
As of match played 27 September 2022

Appearances and goals by national team and year
National team	Year	Apps	Goals
Greece
Greece	2021	2	0
Greece	2022	1	0
Total		3	0

== Honours ==
Lech Poznań II

- III liga, group II: 2018–19

Sivasspor

- Turkish Cup: 2021–22
