= Kerem Atakan Kesgin =

Turkish footballer (born 2000)

Personal information
- Date of birth: 5 November 2000 (age 26)
- Place of birth: Tokat, Turkey
- Height: 1.76 m (5 ft 9 in)
- Position: Midfielder

Team information
- Current team: Sivasspor
- Number: 17

Youth career
- 2011–2013: Gençlerbirliğispor
- 2013–2018: Bucaspor

Senior career*
Years	Team	Apps	(Gls)
2017–2018	Bucaspor	12	(0)
2018–2020	Göztepe	4	(0)
2020–2022	Sivasspor	27	(2)
2022–2025	Beşiktaş	6	(0)
2023	→ Fatih Karagümrük (loan)	5	(0)
2024	→ Sivasspor (loan)	4	(0)
2024–2025	→ Bandırmaspor (loan)	14	(0)
2025–	Sivasspor	9	(0)

International career^{‡}
2015	Turkey U15	6	(1)
2015–2016	Turkey U16	14	(0)
2016–2017	Turkey U17	20	(4)
2017	Turkey U19	4	(1)
2019	Turkey U20	1	(0)
2021–2022	Turkey U21	4	(0)
- * Club domestic league appearances and goals as of 6 May 2026 ‡ National team caps and goals as of 21:13, 30 September 2022 (UTC)

Kerem Atakan Kesgin (born 5 November 2000) is a Turkish footballer who plays as a midfielder for TFF 1. Lig club Sivasspor.

== Career ==
Kesgin is a youth product of Gençlerbirliğispor and Bucaspor, and began his career with the latter in the TFF Second League in 2017. He transferred to Göztepe in January 2018, where he made his debut in the Süper Lig. He transferred to Sivasspor on 30 August 2021, signing a 3 year contract. He helped Sivasspor win the 2021–22 Turkish Cup, coming on as an extra-time substitute coming on the 124th minute.

=== Beşiktaş ===
On 23 August 2022, Kesgin joined Beşiktaş.

On 26 August 2023, Kesgin was loaned to Süper Lig club Fatih Karagümrük until the end of the season.

On 19 January 2024, Kesgin's contract has been mutually terminated as a result of the negotiations.

On 20 January 2024, Kesgin was loaned to Süper Lig club Sivasspor until the end of the season.

On 17 July 2024, Kesgin was loaned to Bandırmaspor until the end of the season.

== International career ==
Kesgin represented Turkey at the 2017 FIFA U-17 World Cup, scoring in a 1-3 defeat by Paraguay.

== Career statistics ==
=== Club ===
As of 10 May 2018.

Club	Season	League			Cup		Continental		Other		Total	
Club	Season	Division	Apps	Goals	Apps	Goals	Apps	Goals	Apps	Goals	Apps	Goals
Bucaspor	2016–17	TFF First League	2	0	0	0	–		0	0	2	0
Bucaspor	2017–18	TFF First League	10	0	5 (Note: Appearances in the Turkish Cup)	0	–		0	0	15	0
Bucaspor	Total		12	0	5	0	0	0	0	0	17	0
Göztepe	2017–18	Süper Lig	1	0	0	0	–		0	0	1	0
Career total			13	0	5	0	0	0	0	0	18	0

== Honours ==
Sivasspor

- Turkish Cup: 2021–22
