= Muammer Yıldırım =

Turkish footballer

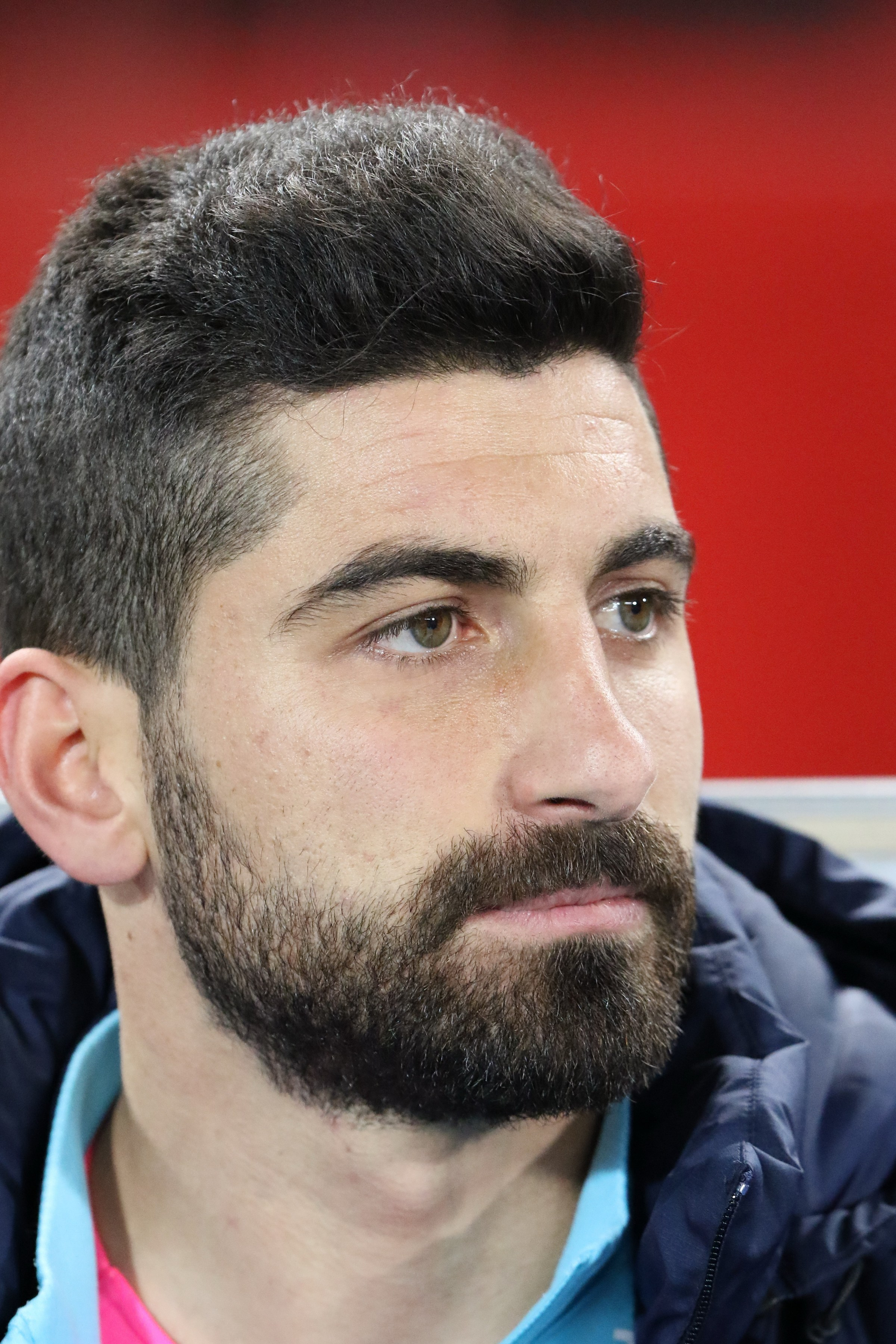
- Yıldırım with Turkey in 2016

Personal information
- Full name: Muammer Yıldırım
- Date of birth: 14 September 1990 (age 36)
- Place of birth: Eğil, Diyarbakır, Turkey
- Height: 1.90 m (6 ft 3 in)
- Position: Goalkeeper

Team information
- Current team: Elazığspor
- Number: 90

Youth career
- 2003–2006: Ankara Esnafspor
- 2006–2007: Türk Telekomspor

Senior career*
Years	Team	Apps	(Gls)
2007–2011	Türk Telekomspor	8	(0)
2011–2013	Van B.B.	60	(0)
2013–2016	Mersin İY	34	(0)
2016–2019	Kayserispor	29	(0)
2019–2024	Sivasspor	23	(0)
2024–2025	Samsunspor	0	(0)
2025–	Elazığspor	16	(0)
- * Club domestic league appearances and goals as of 3 May 2025

Muammer Yıldırım (born 14 September 1990) is a Turkish professional football player who plays as a goalkeeper for Elazığspor.

== Career ==
=== Mersin İdmanyurdu ===
Yıldırım played his first Süper Lig game against Balıkesirspor which ended 3–1 in favour of Mersin İY, at Balıkesir Atatürk Stadı, on 4 May 2015. He finished 2014–15 season with a total of 9 games, including 7 Süper Lig and 2 Ziraat Turkish Cup games. Following farewell of his teammate Bulgarian goalie Nikolay Mihaylov, he played at entire Süper Lig fixture of Mersin İY at the first-halve of 2015–16 Süper Lig season.

=== Kayserispor ===
Yıldırım signed in Kayserispor for a 3-year-deal on 21 July 2016. He earned his first cap for Kayserispor on Week 3 of 2016–17 Süper Lig season on away, against Galatasaray, ended 0–0, on 10 September 2016.

=== International ===
Yıldırım received his first call-up to the Turkey national football team for their friendly against Austria in March 2016.

== Honours ==
Sivasspor

- Turkish Cup: 2021–22
