= Ali Şaşal Vural =

Turkish footballer

Personal information
- Date of birth: 10 July 1990 (age 36)
- Place of birth: Konak, Turkey
- Height: 1.87 m (6 ft 2 in)
- Position: Goalkeeper

Team information
- Current team: Sivasspor
- Number: 35

Youth career
- 2003–2009: Altay

Senior career*
| Years | Team | Apps | (Gls) |
| 2009–2014 | Altay | 63 | (0) |
| 2014–2016 | Eskişehirspor | 14 | (0) |
| 2016–2025 | Sivasspor | 167 | (0) |
- * Club domestic league appearances and goals as of 16 June 2025

Ali Şaşal Vural (born 10 July 1990) is a Turkish professional footballer who plays as a goalkeeper for Sivasspor.

== Career ==
By support of his elder brother Çağdaş, Ali Şaşal Vural started to play football at the age of 13 at Altay S.K. Substituted in 84th minute for Kılıç Arslan Kopuz, Ali Şaşal Vural made his professional debut at TFF First League 2009–10 season game against Konyaspor, ended 4–1 for Altay, held on 8 May 2010 at Izmir Alsancak Stadium. He made his 50th career clean sheet for Sivasspor in the 20/21 season.

On 13 November 2025, Vural was banned from playing for 12 months for his involvement in the 2025 Turkish football betting scandal.

== International career ==
Vural got his first call up to the senior Turkey squad for the UEFA Euro 2016 qualifier against Kazakhstan and for the friendly against Bulgaria in June 2015.

== Honours ==
Sivasspor

- Turkish Cup: 2021–22

== Statistics ==
As of 30 May 2023.

Appearances and goals by club, season and competition
| Club | Season | League | | | Cup | | Continental (Note: Includes appearances in the UEFA Champions League and UEFA Europa League/UEFA Cup.) | | Other (Note: Includes appearances in the Turkish Super Cup.) | | Total | |
| Club | Season | Division | Apps | Goals | Apps | Goals | Apps | Goals | Apps | Goals | Apps | Goals |
|---|---|---|---|---|---|---|---|---|---|---|---|---|
| Altay | 2009–10 | TFF First League | 1 | 0 | — | | — | | — | | 1 | 0 |
| Altay | 2010–11 | TFF First League | 10 | 0 | — | | — | | — | | 10 | 0 |
| Altay | 2011–12 | TFF Second League | 1 | 0 | — | | — | | — | | 1 | 0 |
| Altay | 2012–13 | TFF Second League | 29 | 0 | 2 | 0 | — | | — | | 31 | 0 |
| Altay | 2013–14 | TFF Second League | 22 | 0 | — | | — | | — | | 22 | 0 |
| Altay | Total | | 63 | 0 | 2 | 0 | — | | — | | 65 | 0 |
| Eskişehirspor | 2014–15 | Süper Lig | 9 | 0 | 4 | 0 | — | | — | | 13 | 0 |
| Eskişehirspor | 2015–16 | Süper Lig | 5 | 0 | 1 | 0 | — | | — | | 6 | 0 |
| Eskişehirspor | Total | | 14 | 0 | 5 | 0 | — | | — | | 19 | 0 |
| Sivasspor | 2016–17 | TFF First League | 18 | 0 | 2 | 0 | — | | — | | 20 | 0 |
| Sivasspor | 2017–18 | Süper Lig | 6 | 0 | 1 | 0 | — | | — | | 7 | 0 |
| Sivasspor | 2018–19 | Süper Lig | 8 | 0 | 1 | 0 | — | | — | | 9 | 0 |
| Sivasspor | 2019–20 | Süper Lig | 1 | 0 | 6 | 0 | — | | — | | 7 | 0 |
| Sivasspor | 2020–21 | Süper Lig | 20 | 0 | 2 | 0 | 0 | 0 | — | | 22 | 0 |
| Sivasspor | 2021–22 | Süper Lig | 25 | 0 | 4 | 0 | 6 | 0 | — | | 35 | 0 |
| Sivasspor | 2022–23 | Süper Lig | 30 | 0 | 1 | 0 | 9 | 0 | 1 | 0 | 41 | 0 |
| Sivasspor | Total | | 108 | 0 | 17 | 0 | 15 | 0 | 1 | 0 | 141 | 0 |
| Career total | | | 185 | 0 | 24 | 0 | 15 | 0 | 1 | 0 | 225 | 0 |
