= Uğur Çiftçi =

Turkish footballer

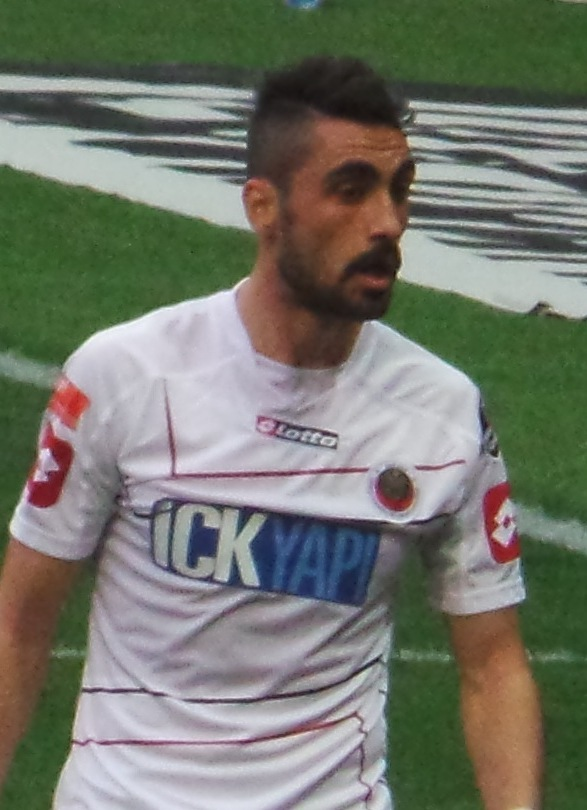
- Çiftçi with Gençlerbirliği in 2014

Personal information
- Date of birth: 4 May 1992 (age 34)
- Place of birth: Sivas, Turkey
- Height: 1.79 m (5 ft 10 in)
- Position: Left-back

Team information
- Current team: Sivasspor
- Number: 3

Youth career
- 2006–2010: Gençlerbirliği

Senior career*
Years	Team	Apps	(Gls)
2010–2018	Gençlerbirliği	124	(5)
2011–2013	→ Hacettepe (loan)	65	(3)
2018–	Sivasspor	234	(3)

International career^{‡}
2013	Turkey U21	2	(0)
2013	Turkey	1	(0)
- * Club domestic league appearances and goals as of 6 May 2026 ‡ National team caps and goals as of 20:39, 26 May 2022 (UTC)

Uğur Çiftçi (born 4 May 1992) is a Turkish professional footballer who plays as a left-back for Sivasspor in the Süper Lig.

== Career statistics ==
As of 25 May 2024

Appearances and goals by club, season and competition
Club	Season	League			Cup		Continental		Other		Total	
Club	Season	Division	Apps	Goals	Apps	Goals	Apps	Goals	Apps	Goals	Apps	Goals
Gençlerbirliği	2010–11	Süper Lig	0	0	0	0	—		—		0	0
Gençlerbirliği	2013–14	Süper Lig	22	0	1	0	—		—		23	0
Gençlerbirliği	2014–15	Süper Lig	19	2	5	0	—		—		24	2
Gençlerbirliği	2015–16	Süper Lig	25	0	0	0	—		—		25	0
Gençlerbirliği	2016–17	Süper Lig	30	1	2	0	—		—		32	1
Gençlerbirliği	2017–18	Süper Lig	28	2	5	0	—		—		33	2
Gençlerbirliği	Total		124	5	13	0	—		—		137	5
Hacettepe (loan)	2011–12	3. Liga	33	1	0	0	—		2	0	35	1
Hacettepe (loan)	2012–13	3. Liga	30	2	1	0	—		—		31	2
Hacettepe (loan)	Total		63	3	1	0	—		2	0	66	3
Sivasspor	2018–19	Süper Lig	21	0	1	0	—		—		22	0
Sivasspor	2019–20	Süper Lig	28	1	4	0	—		—		32	1
Sivasspor	2020–21	Süper Lig	35	0	2	0	4	0	—		41	0
Sivasspor	2021–22	Süper Lig	34	0	4	0	6	0	—		44	0
Sivasspor	2022–23	Süper Lig	23	0	4	0	9	0	1	0	37	0
Sivasspor	2023–24	Süper Lig	36	0	0	0	—		—		38	0
Sivasspor	Total		177	1	15	0	19	0	1	0	212	1
Career total			364	9	29	0	19	0	3	0	415	9

== Honours ==
Sivasspor

- Turkish Cup: 2021–22
