= Hakan Arslan =

Turkish footballer (born 1988)

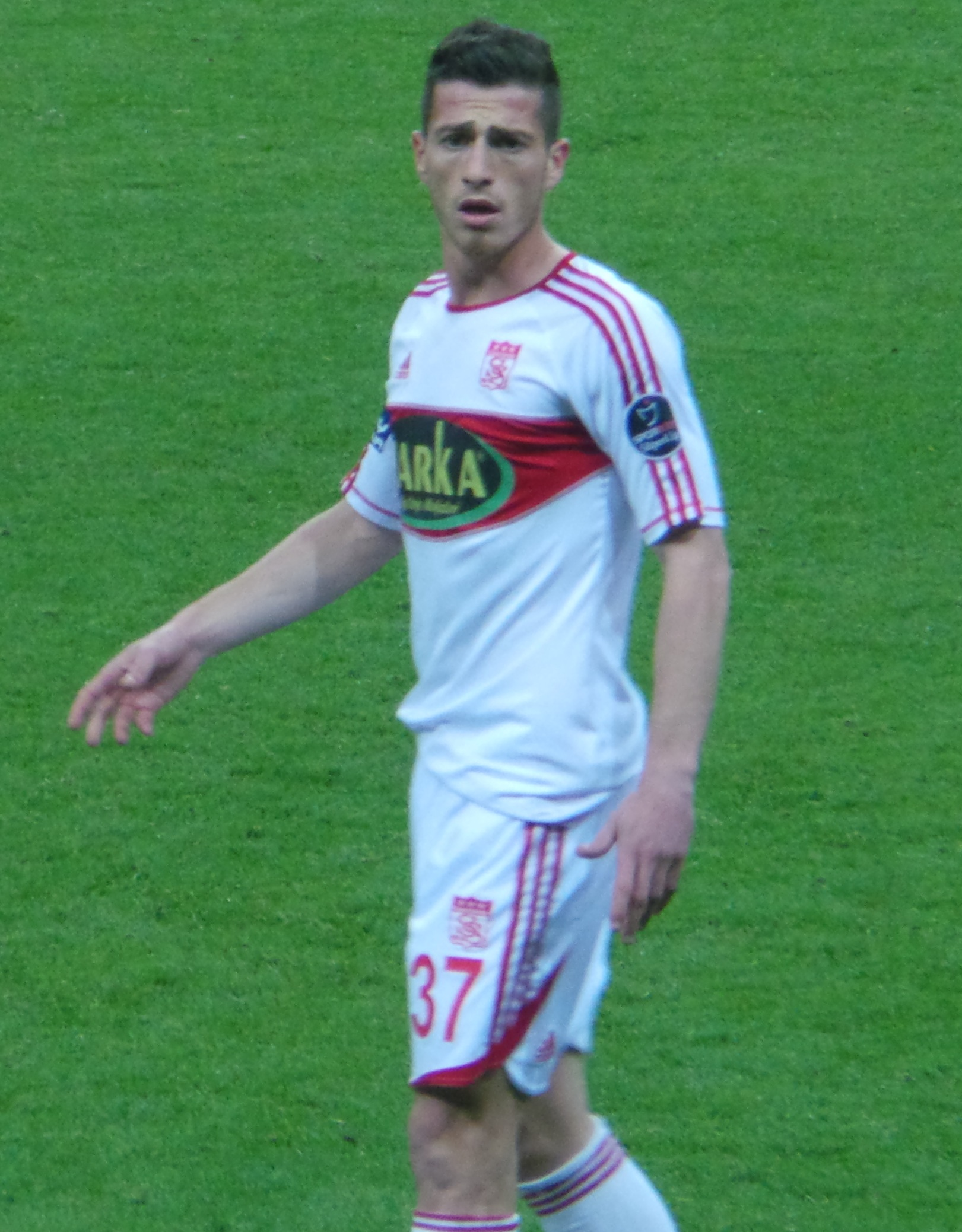
- Arslan with Sivasspor in 2013

Personal information
- Date of birth: 18 July 1988 (age 38)
- Place of birth: Fatih, Turkey
- Height: 1.86 m (6 ft 1 in)
- Position: Midfielder

Youth career
- 1998–2007: İstanbul Güngörenspor

Senior career*
Years	Team	Apps	(Gls)
2007–2011	İstanbul Güngörenspor	90	(23)
2011–2013	Samsunspor	40	(3)
2013–2024	Sivasspor	296	(35)
2015–2016	→ Kasımpaşa (loan)	29	(4)
2024–2025	Serikspor	30	(5)
- * Club domestic league appearances and goals as of 23 September 2025

Hakan Arslan (born 18 July 1988) is a Turkish footballer who plays as a midfielder.

== Playing career ==
Arslan is a youth product of İstanbul Güngörenspor having joined their youth academy in 1998, and started his professional career with them. He transferred to Samsunspor in 2011 and made his professional debut with them in a 2-2 Süper Lig tie with MKE Ankaragücü on 4 November 2011. He transferred to Sivasspor in 2013.

== Honours ==
Sivasspor

- Turkish Cup: 2021–22
