= Ziya Erdal =

Turkish professional footballer

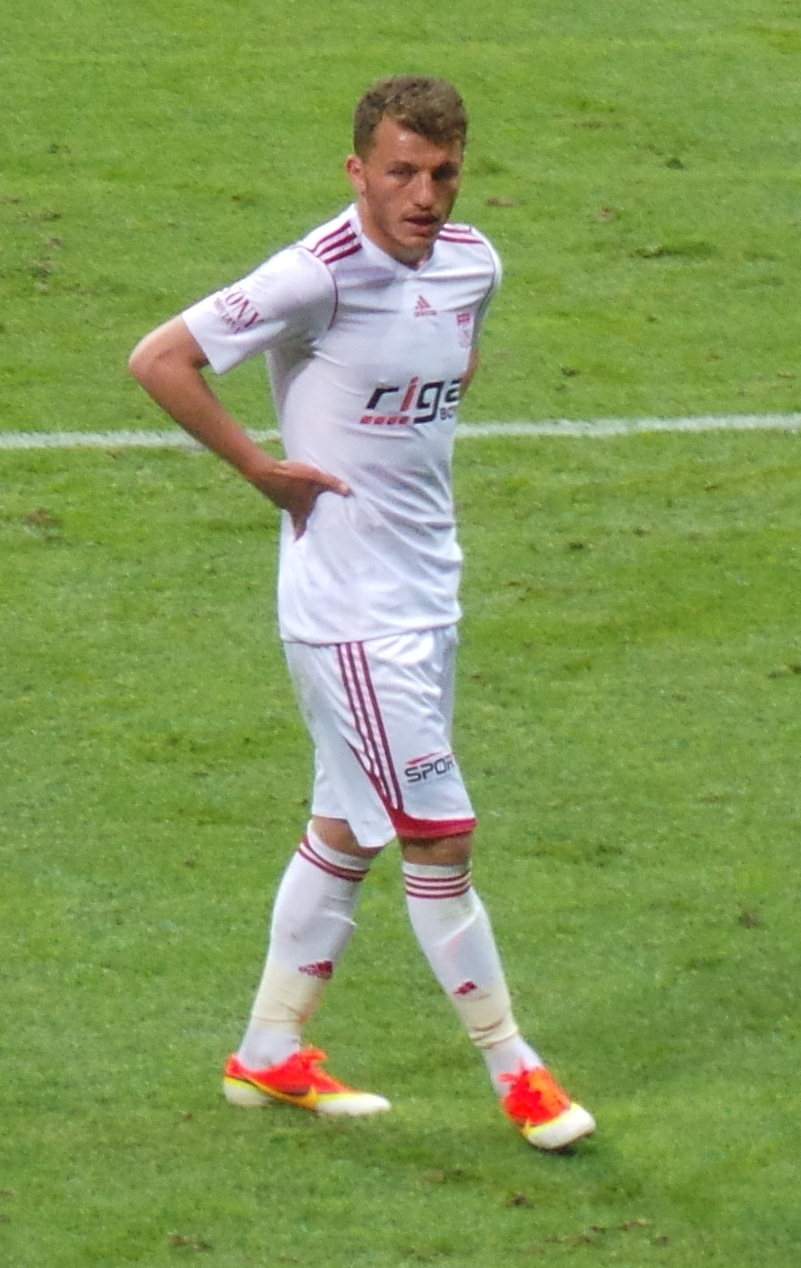
- Erdal with Sivasspor in 2012

Personal information
- Date of birth: 5 January 1988 (age 38)
- Place of birth: Zara, Sivas, Turkey
- Height: 1.82 m (6 ft 0 in)
- Position: Left-back

Youth career
- 2001–2006: Yamanspor
- 2006–2008: Sivasspor

Senior career*
Years	Team	Apps	(Gls)
2008–2009	Sivasspor	0	(0)
2008–2009	→ Kırşehirspor (loan)	8	(0)
2009–2010	Anadolu Üsküdar 1908	31	(1)
2010–2025	Sivasspor	329	(7)

International career^{‡}
2011–2013	Turkey A2	7	(0)
- * Club domestic league appearances and goals as of 16 June 2025 ‡ National team caps and goals as of 21:26, 26 May 2022 (UTC)

Ziya Erdal (born 5 January 1988) is a Turkish professional footballer who plays as a left-back.

== Honours ==
Sivasspor

- Turkish Cup: 2021–22
