= 2020–21 Gençlerbirliği S.K. season =

Gençlerbirliği
2020–21 season
- President: Murat Cavcav
- Manager: Mert Nobre (until 10 November 2020); Mustafa Kaplan (until 1 February 2021); Mehmet Altıparmak (until 8 March 2021); Özcan Bizati (from 12 March 2021)
- Stadium: Eryaman Stadium
- Süper Lig: 20th (relegated)
- Turkish Cup: Fifth round
Home colours	Away colours	Third colours

The 2020–21 season was the 98th season of Gençlerbirliği S.K. in existence and the club's second consecutive season in the top flight of Turkish football. In addition to the domestic league, Gençlerbirliği participated in the season's edition of the Turkish Cup. The season covers the period from July 2020 to 30 June 2021.

== Players ==
=== First-team squad ===
Note: Flags indicate national team as defined under FIFA eligibility rules; some limited exceptions apply. Players may hold more than one non-FIFA nationality.

No.	Pos.	Nation	Player
1	GK	SWE	Kristoffer Nordfeldt
2	DF	SWE	Mattias Johansson
3	DF	TUR	Halil Pehlivan
4	DF	TUR	Arda Kızıldağ
6	DF	BRA	Diego Ângelo
7	MF	POL	Dominik Furman
8	MF	TUR	Soner Dikmen
9	FW	ROU	Bogdan Stancu
10	MF	TUR	Sefa Yılmaz
11	MF	AUT	Srđan Spiridonović (on loan from Red Star Belgrade)
12	DF	TUR	Mustafa Akbaş
13	FW	CIV	Giovanni Sio
14	DF	TUR	Metehan Mert
15	MF	SEN	Zargo Touré
17	FW	TUR	İlker Karakaş
19	MF	TUR	Rahmetullah Berişbek

No.	Pos.	Nation	Player
21	MF	POR	Daniel Candeias
23	MF	PAR	Robert Piris Da Motta (on loan from Flamengo)
24	DF	TUR	Salih Dursun
26	FW	TUR	Gökhan Altıparmak
27	DF	TUR	Ömürcan Artan
28	MF	GUI	Sadio Diallo
30	MF	ARG	Lucas Mugni
33	FW	TOG	Floyd Ayité
39	DF	FRA	Pierre-Yves Polomat
44	GK	TUR	Übeyd Adıyaman
55	DF	TUR	Abdullah Şahindere
63	MF	TUR	Mustafa Hüseyin Seyhan
66	MF	TUR	Mert Kabasakal
88	MF	NED	Murat Yıldırım
91	FW	BRA	Sandro Lima
93	GK	TUR	Atalay Gökçe

=== Out on loan ===
Note: Flags indicate national team as defined under FIFA eligibility rules; some limited exceptions apply. Players may hold more than one non-FIFA nationality.

No.	Pos.	Nation	Player
—	DF	TUR	Ömer Alper Tatlısu (at Hacettepe)
—	MF	TUR	Emre Gündoğdu (at Ankara Keçiörengücü)
—	GK	TUR	Batuhan Uçan (at Gümüşhanespor)
—	DF	TUR	Kadir Kıra (at Hacettepe)
—	FW	TUR	Baran Başyiğit (at Hacettepe)
—	MF	TUR	Mustafa Çeçenoğlu (at Boluspor)

== Pre-season and friendlies ==
Win Draw Loss Fixtures

== Competitions ==
=== Overview ===
Competition	First match	Last match	Starting round	Final position	Record							
Competition	First match	Last match	Starting round	Final position	Pld	W	D	L	GF	GA	GD	Win %
Süper Lig	13 September 2020	15 May 2021	Matchday 1	20th	40	10	8	22	44	76	−32	25.00
Turkish Cup	24 November 2020	17 December 2020	Fourth round	Fifth round	2	1	0	1	1	2	−1	50.00
Total					42	11	8	23	45	78	−33	26.19

Source: Soccerway

=== Süper Lig ===
==== League table ====
Pos	Team	Pld	W	D	L	GF	GA	GD	Pts	Qualification or relegation
17	Kayserispor	40	9	14	17	35	52	−17	41	
18	BB Erzurumspor (R)	40	10	10	20	44	68	−24	40	Relegation to TFF First League
19	Ankaragücü (R)	40	10	8	22	46	65	−19	38	Relegation to TFF First League
20	Gençlerbirliği (R)	40	10	8	22	44	76	−32	38	Relegation to TFF First League
21	Denizlispor (R)	40	6	10	24	38	77	−39	28	Relegation to TFF First League

Source: Süper Lig, Soccerway
Rules for classification: 1) Points; 2) Head-to-head points; 3) Head-to-head goal difference; 4) Head-to-head goals scored; 5) Goal difference; 6) Goals scored; 7) Play-off.
(R) Relegated

==== Results summary ====
Overall								Home						Away					
Pld	W	D	L	GF	GA	GD	Pts	W	D	L	GF	GA	GD	W	D	L	GF	GA	GD
40	10	8	22	44	76	−32	38	6	5	9	27	35	−8	4	3	13	17	41	−24

Source: Süper Lig

==== Results by round ====
Round	1	2	3	4	5	6	7	8	9	10	11	12	13	14	15	16	17	18	19	20	21	22	23	24	25	26	27	28	29	30	31	32	33	34	35	36	37	38	39	40	41	42
Ground	A	H	B	A	H	A	H	A	H	A	H	A	H	A	H	A	H	A	H	A	H	H	A	B	H	A	H	A	H	A	H	A	H	A	H	A	H	A	H	A	H	A
Result	L	D	B	W	L	L	D	L	L	L	W	W	D	L	W	D	W	L	L	L	L	L	D	B	L	L	D	L	L	W	W	W	D	L	L	D	W	L	L	L	W	L
Position	17	16	17	14	19	21	18	20	20	21	19	17	17	18	17	17	16	17	17	18	18	19	19	19	19	21	20	21	21	21	20	19	19	19	20	20	20	20	20	20	20	20

Source: TFF.org
A = Away; H = Home; B = Bye; W = Win; D = Draw; L = Loss

Note: Since the league has been expanded to 21 teams each team will earn a bye twice this season.

==== Matches ====
13 September 2020 1	Antalyaspor	2–0	Gençlerbirliği	Antalya
20:00 TRT (UTC+3)	Amilton (yellow card) 39'; Balcı 41'; Özmert 77'	Report	Ângelo (yellow card) 53'	Stadium: New Antalya Stadium; Attendance: 0 Referee: Yasin Kol

19 September 2020 2	Gençlerbirliği	0–0	Konyaspor	Ankara
13:30 TRT (UTC+3)		Report		Stadium: Eryaman Stadium; Attendance: 0 Referee: Mustafa Öğretmenoğlu

3	BYE

4 October 2020 4	Beşiktaş	0–1	Gençlerbirliği	Istanbul
16:00 TRT (UTC+3)		Report	Stancu 8'	Stadium: Vodafone Park; Attendance: 0 Referee: Mete Kalkavan

19 October 2020 5	Gençlerbirliği	1–2	Denizlispor	Ankara
20:00 TRT (UTC+3)	Da Motta (yellow card) 45'; Candeias 90'	Report	Subotić 22'; Rodallega 45'	Stadium: Eryaman Stadium; Attendance: 0 Referee: Mert Güzenge

25 October 2020 6	Yeni Malatyaspor	2–1	Gençlerbirliği	Malatya
13:30 TRT (UTC+3)	Kaya 24'; Kanatsızkuş 53'	Report	Yıldırım 10'	Stadium: Malatya Arena; Attendance: 0 Referee: Halis Özkahya

31 October 2020 7	Gençlerbirliği	1–1	Gaziantep	Ankara
13:30 TRT (UTC+3)	Yıldırım (yellow card) 45'; Candeias 56' (yellow card) 71'; Dikmen (yellow card) 84'	Report	Maxim 17' (pen.); André Sousa (yellow card) 50'; Mirallas (yellow card) 73'; Morais (yellow card) 85'	Stadium: Eryaman Stadium; Attendance: 0 Referee: Turgut Doman

8 November 2020 8	İstanbul Başakşehir	2–1	Gençlerbirliği	Istanbul
16:00 TRT (UTC+3)	Gulbrandsen 80'; Topal 90+4'	Report	Yılmaz 1'	Stadium: Başakşehir Fatih Terim Stadium; Attendance: 0 Referee: Mustafa Öğretmenoğlu

21 November 2020 9	Gençlerbirliği	1–5	Fenerbahçe	Ankara
16:00 TRT (UTC+3)	Ângelo 31'; Polomat (yellow card) 52'; Sio (yellow card) 54'; Da Motta (yellow card) 79'	Report	Yandaş 14'; Perotti 38' (pen.), 69'; Sosa 47'; Pelkas (yellow card) 56'; Tufan 72'	Stadium: Eryaman Stadium; Attendance: 0 Referee: Halil Umut Meler

29 November 2020 10	Kasımpaşa	2–0	Gençlerbirliği	Istanbul
16:00 TRT (UTC+3)	Hodžić 16', 25'	Report		Stadium: Recep Tayyip Erdoğan Stadium; Attendance: 0 Referee: Mete Kalkavan

5 December 2020 11	Gençlerbirliği	2–1	Alanyaspor	Ankara
13:30 TRT (UTC+3)	Özdemir 41'; Polomat (yellow card) 72'; Candeias 75'; Sio (yellow card) 77'; Touré (yellow card) 81'; Kızıldağ (yellow card) 90+4'	Report	Bakasetas (yellow card) 81', (goal) 83' (pen.); Kutlu (yellow card) 85'	Stadium: Eryaman Stadium; Attendance: 0 Referee: Fırat Aydınus

13 December 2020 12	BB Erzurum	0–1	Gençlerbirliği	Erzurum
13:30 TRT (UTC+3)		Report	Yılmaz 81'	Stadium: Kazım Karabekir Stadium; Attendance: 0 Referee: Alper Ulusoy

20 December 2020 13	Gençlerbirliği	1–1	Ankaragücü	Ankara
13:30 TRT (UTC+3)	Özdemir 58'; Altıparmak (red card) 90+6'	Report	Lobzhanidze 74'	Stadium: Eryaman Stadium; Attendance: 0 Referee: Yaşar Kemal Uğurlu

24 December 2020 14	Sivasspor	3–1	Gençlerbirliği	Sivas
16:00 TRT (UTC+3)	Gradel 45+2'; Arslan 71'; Yatabaré 86'	Report	Kızıldağ 90+2'	Stadium: Sivas Stadium; Attendance: 0 Referee: Tugay Kaan Numanoğlu

28 December 2020 15	Gençlerbirliği	3–2	Kayserispor	Ankara
16:00 TRT (UTC+3)	Candeias 39'; Da Motta (yellow card) 44'; Kızıldağ 56'; Özdemir (yellow card) 69'; Özdemir 70'	Report	Ackah (yellow card) 29'; Kanga 31'; Eraltay (yellow card) 69'; Çapar 89'	Stadium: Eryaman Stadium; Attendance: 0 Referee: Cüneyt Çakιr

3 January 2021 16	Çaykur Rizespor	1–1	Gençlerbirliği	Rize
13:30 TRT (UTC+3)	Škoda 8'	Report	Dikmen 64'	Stadium: Yeni Rize Şehir Stadium; Attendance: 0 Referee: Suat Arslanboga

6 January 2021 17	Gençlerbirliği	3–1	Hatayspor	Ankara
16:00 TRT (UTC+3)	Da Motta 45+3' (pen.), 54' (pen.); Sio 84'	Report	Boupendza 25'; Munir (red card) 43'	Stadium: Eryaman Stadium; Attendance: 0 Referee: Yasin Kol

9 January 2021 18	Galatasaray	6–0	Gençlerbirliği	Istanbul
19:00 TRT (UTC+3)	Diagne 1'; Belhanda 30', 44', 45+1'; Çağlayan 64'; Babel 67' (pen.)	Report	Ayité (yellow card) 25'; Polomat (yellow card) 29'; Da Motta (yellow card) 69'	Stadium: Türk Telekom Stadium; Attendance: 0 Referee: Halis Özkahya

15 January 2021 19	Gençlerbirliği	1–3	Fatih Karagümrük	Ankara
19:00 TRT (UTC+3)	Da Motta 74' (pen.)	Report	Biglia 22' (pen.); Ndao 36'; Sobiech 88'	Stadium: Eryaman Stadium; Attendance: 0 Referee: Ali Şansalan

19 January 2021 20	Göztepe	4–0	Gençlerbirliği	İzmir
16:00 TRT (UTC+3)	Titi (yellow card) 14'; Zulj 25'; Ndiaye 45'; Akbunar 45+1'; Akbunar 71'	Report	Yıldırım (yellow card) 21'; Da Motta (yellow card) 22'	Stadium: Gürsel Aksel Stadium; Attendance: 0 Referee: Burak Şeker

23 January 2021 21	Gençlerbirliği	1–2	Trabzonspor	Ankara
16:00 TRT (UTC+3)	Dikmen (yellow card) 28'; Furman (yellow card) 43'; Da Motta 86' (pen.)	Report	Djaniny 36'; Ekuban 54'; Ié (yellow card) 85'; Çörekçi (yellow card) 90+4'	Stadium: Eryaman Stadium; Attendance: 0 Referee: Mustafa Öğretmenoğlu

31 January 2021 22	Gençlerbirliği	0–1	Antalyaspor	Ankara
16:00 TRT (UTC+3)	Dikmen (yellow card) 80'; Berişbek (yellow card) 90+1'	Report	Orgill (yellow card) 68'; Sam 87'	Stadium: Eryaman Stadium; Attendance: 0 Referee: Bahattin Şimşek

3 February 2021 23	Konyaspor	0–0	Gençlerbirliği	Konya
19:00 TRT (UTC+3)		Report		Stadium: Konya Büyükşehir Stadium; Attendance: 0 Referee: Özgür Yankaya

24	BYE

15 February 2021 25	Gençlerbirliği	0–3	Beşiktaş	Ankara
19:00 TRT (UTC+3)	Ayité (yellow card) 28'; Furman (yellow card) 36'; Candeias (yellow card) 78'	Report	Ghezzal 4'; De Souza (yellow card) 87'; Tosun 89', 90+3'; Toköz (yellow card) 90+7'	Stadium: Eryaman Stadium; Attendance: 0 Referee: Yaşar Kemal Uğurlu

20 February 2021 26	Denizlispor	1–0	Gençlerbirliği	Denizli
16:00 TRT (UTC+3)	Mešanović 19'	Report		Stadium: Atatürk Stadium; Attendance: 0 Referee: Tugay Kaan Numanoğlu

26 February 2021 27	Gençlerbirliği	1–1	Yeni Malatyaspor	Ankara
16:00 TRT (UTC+3)	Özbir 60' (o.g.); Ayité (yellow card) 36' (yellow-red card) 71'	Report	Kaya (red card) 21'; Tetteh 34'	Stadium: Eryaman Stadium; Attendance: 0 Referee: Alper Ulusoy

2 March 2021 28	Gaziantep	2–1	Gençlerbirliği	Gaziantep
16:00 TRT (UTC+3)	Mirallas (red card) 58'; Özer 59'; Jefferson 79'	Report	Lima 18'; Yılmaz (yellow card) 30'; Artan (yellow card) 90'	Stadium: Gaziantep Arena; Attendance: 0 Referee: Bahattin Şimşek

7 March 2021 29	Gençlerbirliği	0–1	İstanbul Başakşehir	Ankara
16:00 TRT (UTC+3)	Polomat (yellow card) 57' (yellow-red card) 88'	Report	Aleksić (yellow card) 16'; Kaldırım (yellow card) 58'; Ba 90'	Stadium: Eryaman Stadium; Attendance: 0 Referee: Özgür Yankaya

14 March 2021 30	Fenerbahçe	1–2	Gençlerbirliği	Istanbul
19:00 TRT (UTC+3)	Novák 35'; Aziz (yellow card) 62'	Report	Candeias (yellow card) 30'; Aziz 39' (o.g.); Ayité 63'; Yıldırım (yellow card) 65'; Nordfeldt (yellow card) 82'; Lima (yellow card) 89'; Artan (yellow card) 90+1'	Stadium: Şükrü Saracoğlu Stadium; Attendance: 0 Referee: Abdulkadir Bitigen

20 March 2021 31	Gençlerbirliği	2–1	Kasımpaşa	Ankara
13:30 TRT (UTC+3)	Ayité (yellow card) 21'; Yılmaz 60'; Dikmen (yellow card) 73'; Yılmaz 76'; Diego Ângelo (yellow card) 84'	Report	Erdoğan 66'; Hadergjonaj (yellow card) 84'	Stadium: Eryaman Stadium; Attendance: 0 Referee: Arda Kardeşler

4 April 2021 32	Alanyaspor	1–2	Gençlerbirliği	Alanya
17:00 TRT (UTC+3)	Kutlu 37'; Siopis (yellow card) 63'	Report	Johansson 8'; Pehlivan (yellow card) 16'; Dikmen (yellow card) 35'; Kızıldağ (yellow card) 49'; Lima 61'; Stancu 82'	Stadium: Bahçeşehir Okulları Stadium; Attendance: 0 Referee: Ali Şansalan

7 April 2021 33	Gençlerbirliği	1–1	BB Erzurum	Ankara
16:00 TRT (UTC+3)	Lima 29'; Johansson (yellow card) 43'; Da Motta (yellow card) 76'	Report	Bergdich (yellow card) 45+1'; Uçar (yellow card) 90+1'; Karakullukçu (yellow card) 90+3'; da Costa 90+4'	Stadium: Eryaman Stadium; Attendance: 0 Referee: Suat Arslanboğa

11 April 2021 34	Ankaragücü	2–1	Gençlerbirliği	Ankara
16:00 TRT (UTC+3)	Çekiçi (yellow card) 29'; Güral 66'; Šarlija (yellow card) 82'; Geraldo (yellow card) 86'; Paintsil (yellow card) 90+3'	Report	Da Motta (yellow card) 64'; Kızıldağ 70'; Stancu 75'; Johansson (yellow card) 75'; Yılmaz (yellow card) 82'; Kızıldağ (yellow card) 90+4'	Stadium: Eryaman Stadium; Attendance: 0 Referee: Serkan Tokat

16 April 2021 35	Gençlerbirliği	2-3	Sivasspor	Ankara
16:00 TRT (UTC+3)	Diego Ângelo 25'; Johansson 37'; Lima (yellow card) 75'; Yılmaz (yellow card) 86'; Candeias (yellow card) 86'	Report	Yalçın (yellow card) 34'; Gradel (yellow card) 44'; Yeşilyurt (yellow card) 51'; Félix 78'; Kayode 83'; Polomat 90+4' (o.g.)	Stadium: Eryaman Stadium; Attendance: 0 Referee: Ümit Öztürk

20 April 2021 36	Kayserispor	2-2	Gençlerbirliği	Kayseri
16:00 TRT (UTC+3)	Çelik (yellow card) 17'; Demirok (yellow card) 27'; Pedro Henrique 40'; Avramovski (yellow card) 53'; Pedro Henrique (yellow card) 75'; Parlak (yellow card) 80'; Kolovetsios (yellow card)	Report	Da Motta 46'; Stancu 51'; Adıyaman (yellow card) 63'; Lima (yellow card) 90+3'	Stadium: Kadir Has Stadium; Attendance: 0 Referee: Alper Ulusoy

23 April 2021 37	Gençlerbirliği	2-1	Çaykur Rizespor	Ankara
20:30 TRT (UTC+3)	Johansson 45+1'; Pehlivan (yellow card) 61'; Sio 62'	Report	Samudio 74'	Stadium: Eryaman Stadium; Attendance: 0 Referee: Bahattin Şimşek

27 April 2021 38	Hatayspor	3-1	Gençlerbirliği	Hatay
20:30 TRT (UTC+3)	Aabid 9'; Boupendza (yellow card) 11'; Sackey (yellow card) 44'; Diouf 51'; Diouf 84'; Kamara (yellow card) 90'	Report	Da Motta (yellow card) 72'; Da Motta 78' (pen.); Dikmen (yellow card) 9'	Stadium: Antakya Atatürk Stadium; Attendance: 0 Referee: Arda Kardeşler

2 May 2021 39	Gençlerbirliği	0-2	Galatasaray	Ankara
20:30 TRT (UTC+3)	Lima (yellow card) 52'	Report	Fernandes (yellow card) 38'; Dervişoğlu 44'; Akbaba 53'	Stadium: Eryaman Stadium; Attendance: 0 Referee: Halis Özkahya

8 May 2021 40	Fatih Karagümrük	5-1	Gençlerbirliği	Istanbul
20:30 TRT (UTC+3)	Zukanović 8'; Borini 16'; Lens (yellow card) 52'; Ndao 60'; Ndao 75'; Lens 88' (pen.); Roco (yellow card) 90+1'	Report	Stancu (yellow card) 28'; Artan (yellow card) 87'; Karakaş 90+2'	Stadium: Başakşehir Fatih Terim Stadium; Attendance: 0 Referee: Özgür Yankaya

11 May 2021 41	Gençlerbirliği	5-3	Göztepe	Ankara
20:30 TRT (UTC+3)	Furman (yellow card) 14'; Ângelo 44'; Da Motta (yellow card) 45+1'; Ayité 49'; Stancu 56'; Stancu 70'; Stancu 82'	Report	Ideye 12'; Kayan 30'; Bureković (yellow card) 48'; Şimşek 50'; Efe Binici (yellow card) 90'	Stadium: Eryaman Stadium; Attendance: 0 Referee: Suat Arslanboğa

15 May 2021 42	Trabzonspor	2-1	Gençlerbirliği	Trabzon
20:30 TRT (UTC+3)	Ekuban 44'; Vitor Hugo (yellow card) 78'; Afobe 87'	Report	Ayité (yellow card) 34'; Ayité 52'; Yılmaz (yellow card) 72'	Stadium: Şenol Güneş Stadium; Attendance: 0 Referee: Tugay Kaan Numanoğlu

=== Turkish Cup ===
24 November 2020 Fourth round	Gençlerbirliği	1–0	Kırşehir Belediyespor	Ankara
13:00 TRT (UTC+3)	Dikmen 61'			Stadium: Eryaman Stadium

17 December 2020 Fifth round	Gençlerbirliği	0–2	Tuzlaspor	Ankara
13:00 TRT (UTC+3)			Bora 32'; Sarr 43'	Stadium: Eryaman Stadium

== Statistics ==
=== Appearances and goals ===
Players with no appearances not included in the list.

No.	Pos.	Nat.	Name	Süper Lig		Turkish Cup		Total	
No.	Pos.	Nat.	Name	Apps	Goals	Apps	Goals	Apps	Goals
1	GK	(Sweden)	Kristoffer Nordfeldt	36	0	0	0	36	0
2	DF	(Sweden)	Mattias Johansson	29	3	0	--	29	3
3	DF	(Turkey)	Halil Pehlivan	23	2	2	0	25	2
4	DF	(Turkey)	Arda Kızıldağ	31	1	1	0	32	1
6	DF	(Brazil)	Diego Ângelo	25	3	0	0	25	3
7	MF	(Poland)	Dominik Furman	21	0	2	0	23	0
8	MF	(Turkey)	Soner Dikmen	34	1	1	1	35	2
9	FW	(Romania)	Bogdan Stancu	24	7	0	0	24	7
10	MF	(Turkey)	Sefa Yılmaz	35	4	1	0	36	4
11	MF	(Austria)	Srđan Spiridonović	6	0	0	0	6	0
12	DF	(Turkey)	Mustafa Akbaş	6	0	0	0	6	0
13	FW	(Ivory Coast)	Giovanni Sio	22	2	0	0	22	2
14	DF	(Turkey)	Metehan Mert	5	0	0	0	5	0
15	DF	(Senegal)	Zargo Touré	23	0	0	0	23	0
17	FW	(Turkey)	İlker Karakaş	20	1	1	0	21	1
19	MF	(Turkey)	Rahmetullah Berişbek	16	0	1	0	17	0
21	MF	(Portugal)	Daniel Candeias	35	4	0	0	35	4
23	MF	(Paraguay)	Robert Piris Da Motta	36	6	0	0	36	6
26	FW	(Turkey)	Gökhan Altıparmak	15	0	2	0	17	0
27	DF	(Turkey)	Ömürcan Artan	12	0	0	0	12	0
30	MF	(Argentina)	Lucas Mugni	10	0	0	0	10	0
33	FW	(Togo)	Floyd Ayité	30	3	0	0	30	3
39	DF	(France)	Pierre-Yves Polomat	33	0	0	0	33	0
44	GK	(Turkey)	Übeyd Adıyaman	4	0	1	0	5	0
55	DF	(Turkey)	Abdullah Şahindere	1	0	1	0	2	0
63	MF	(Turkey)	Mustafa Hüseyin Seyhan	9	0	1	0	10	0
66	MF	(Turkey)	Mert Kabasakal	0	0	1	0	1	0
88	MF	(Netherlands)	Murat Yıldırım	30	1	1	0	31	1
91	FW	(Brazil)	Sandro Lima	16	2	0	0	16	2
93	GK	(Turkey)	Atalay Gökçe	1	0	0	0	1	0
Players on loan who featured during season
16	GK	(Turkey)	Batuhan Uçan	0	0	1	0	1	0
22	DF	(Turkey)	Kadir Kıra	0	0	2	0	2	0
28	FW	(Turkey)	Baran Başyiğit	0	0	2	0	2	0
77	MF	(Turkey)	Mustafa Çeçenoğlu	6	0	1	0	6	0
Players who left but featured during season
5	MF	(Turkey)	Berat Özdemir	13	3	0	0	13	3
