= 2021–22 Turkish Cup =

Ziraat Turkish Cup

Tournament details
- Country: Turkey
- Dates: 7 September 2021 – 26 May 2022
- Teams: 133

Final positions
- Champions: Sivasspor
- Runners-up: Kayserispor
- Semifinalists: Trabzonspor; Alanyaspor

The 2021–22 Turkish Cup (Turkish: Türkiye Kupası) was the 60th season of the tournament. Ziraat Bankası was the sponsor of the tournament, thus the sponsored name is Ziraat Turkish Cup. The winners earned a berth in the play-off round of the 2022–23 UEFA Europa League, and also qualified for the 2022 Turkish Super Cup.

== Competition format ==
Round	Dates	Total Clubs Remaining	Clubs Involved	Winners from Previous Round	New Entries at This Round	Leagues Entering at This Round	Notes
First round	7-9 September 2021	133	10	0	10	all teams in 2021–22 TFF 3rd League groups except those listed in the second round (10)	single leg
Second round	28-30 September 2021	128	50	5	45	teams eliminated in 2020–21 TFF 3rd League play-offs (14); teams relegated from 2020-21 TFF 2nd League (6); teams ranked 6th to 11th in 2020–21 TFF 3rd League groups (24); best 12th ranked team in 2020–21 TFF 3rd League groups (1)	single leg
Third round	26-28 October 2021	103	88	25	63	all teams in 2021–22 TFF 2nd League groups (39); all teams in 2021–22 TFF 1st League (19); all teams in 2020-21 TFF Super League except those listed in the fourth and fifth rounds (5)	single leg; seeding applied; seeded team play at home
Fourth round	30 November / 1–2 December 2021	59	54	44	10	teams ranked 6th to 15th in 2020–21 TFF Super League (10)	single leg; seeding applied; seeded team play at home
Fifth round	28-30 December 2021	32	32	27	5	teams ranked 1st to 5th in 2020–21 TFF Super League (5)	single leg; seeding applied; seeded team play at home
Round of 16	8-10 February 2022	16	16	16	0		single leg; seeding applied
Quarter-finals	1-3 March 2022	8	8	8	0		single leg; seeding applied
Semi-finals	19–20 April 2022 (1st leg); 10–11 May 2022 (2nd leg)	4	4	4	0		two legs; no away goal rule
Final	26 May 2022	2	2	2	0		single leg

== First round ==
10 Third League teams competed in this round. No seeds were applied in the single-leg round. The draw was made on 25 August 2021. The match schedules were announced on 29 August 2021. 2 seeded and 3 unseeded teams qualified for the next round. Biggest upset was Kuşadasıspor (133) eliminating Modafen (128). Lowest-ranked team qualifying for the next round was Kuşadasıspor (133). Highest-ranked team eliminated was Siirt İl Özel İdare (124).

7 September 2021	Batman Petrolspor	0 – 1	Hendekspor	Batman
15:00			Alemdar 54'	Stadium: Batman

8 September 2021	Siirt İl Özel İdare	0 – 1 (a.e.t.)	Çankaya FK	Siirt
15:00			Yavilioğlu 92'	Stadium: Siirt Atatürk

8 September 2021	Iğdır Futbol Kulübü	1 – 0 (a.e.t.)	Orduspor 1967 SK	Van
15:00	Avşar 92'			Stadium: Van Atatürk

8 September 2021	Karaman Belediyespor	2 – 5	Kahta 02 Spor	Karaman
15:30	Yıldırım 43'; Serbest 86' (pen.)		Kılıç 6', 32'; Okur 26', 46'; Arslan 50'	Stadium: Kemal Kaynaş

8 September 2021	Kuşadasıspor	3 – 0	Modafen	Aydin
16:00	Çiçekli 61'; Akbulut 65'; Gökoğlan 72'			Stadium: Özer Türk

== Second round ==
50 Third League teams competed in this round. No seeds were applied in the single-leg round. The draw was made on 15 September 2021. The match schedules were announced on 17 September 2021. 7 seeded and 18 unseeded teams qualified for the next round. Biggest upset was Kahta 02 Spor (125) eliminating Hacettepe Spor (82). Lowest-ranked team qualifying for the next round was Iğdır Futbol Kulübü (130). Highest-ranked team eliminated was Gümüşhanespor (79).

28 September 2021	Elazığspor	0 – 1	Arnavutköy Belediye	Elazig
13:00			Çelik 48'	Stadium: Doğukent

28 September 2021	Karaköprü Belediyespor	2 – 0	Kızılcabölükspor	Sanliurfa
14:00	Daniş 44'; Büyükkaya 55'			Stadium: Faruk Çelik Spor Kompleksi

28 September 2021	Nevşehir Belediyespor	3 – 0	Fethiyespor	Nevsehir
14:30	Dağlı 27'; Karaahmet 56'; Doğu 88'			Stadium: Gazi

28 September 2021	Belediye Derincespor	2 – 1	Erbaaspor	Kocaeli
15:00	Somay 22'; Özkabak 27'		Hatipoğlu 38'	Stadium: Derince Belediyesi Doğal Çim Sahası

28 September 2021	Edirnespor	3 – 0	Çatalcaspor	Edirne
15:30	Akman 27'; Atlam 47' (o.g.); Serin 82'			Stadium: Edirne 25 Kasım

28 September 2021	İçel İdman Yurdu	1 – 1 (a.e.t.) (5–6 p)	Düzcespor	Mersin
19:00	Sezgin 79'		Keleş 88'	Stadium: Mersin
	Penalties
	Önder (penalty missed); Ceylan (penalty scored); Aktaş (penalty scored); Çeri (penalty scored); Bölükbaşı (penalty scored); Tunç (penalty scored); Demirbuga (penalty missed)		(penalty scored) Eker; (penalty scored) Keleş; (penalty missed) Barutcu; (penalty scored) Şirin; (penalty scored) Yeşil; (penalty scored) Temizsoy; (penalty scored) Gürbüzerol

29 September 2021	Çankaya FK	3 – 2	Ofspor	Ankara
13:00	Erik 22' (pen.); Sari 79'; Yavilioğlu 84'		Kaya 53'; Çırtlık 66'	Stadium: Yeni Mahalle Hasan Doğan

29 September 2021	Ağrı 1970 Spor	1 – 0 (a.e.t.)	Kuşadasıspor	Ağrı
14:00	Demir 96'			Stadium: Vali Lütfü Yeğenoğlu

29 September 2021	Artvin Hopaspor	2 – 0	Başkent Gözgözler Akademi FK	Artvin
14:00	Memnun 47'; Cinkaya 67'			Stadium: Hopa İlçe

29 September 2021	Fatsa Belediyespor	1 – 0 (a.e.t.)	Beyoğlu Yeniçarşıspor	Ordu
14:00	Baykal 96' (pen.)			Stadium: Fatsa İlçe

29 September 2021	Yomraspor	4 – 0	Yeşilyurt Belediyespor	Trabzon
14:00	Kayıkcı 13' (pen.); Sevinç 36'; Taşdelen 83', 87'			Stadium: Yomra İlçe

29 September 2021	1954 Kelkit Belediyespor	2 – 2 (a.e.t.) (2–3 p)	Ceyhanspor	Gumushane
14:00	Özdemir 7'; Sağlam 67'		Keklik 22'; Öztürk 90+2'	Stadium: Kelkit İlçe

29 September 2021	Alanya Kestelspor	2 – 0	Bursa Yıldırımspor	Antalya
14:30	Bulut 7' (pen.); Ülük 90'			Stadium: Alanya Milli Egemenlik

29 September 2021	Çarşambaspor	1 – 1 (a.e.t.) (4-2 p)	Altındağspor	Samsun
14:30	Aras 90+4'		Bozkuş 77' (pen.)	Stadium: Çarşamba Şehir

29 September 2021	68 Aksaray Belediyespor	3 – 0	Bayrampaşa SK	Aksaray
14:30	İntepe 9', 83'; Özel 38'			Stadium: Aksaray Dağılgan

29 September 2021	Bergama Belediyespor	1 – 1 (a.e.t.) (5-4 p)	Sancaktepe FK	Izmir
15:00	Bodur 77'		Eryılmaz 5'	Stadium: Menemen İlçe

29 September 2021	Büyükçekmece Tepecikspor	2 – 2 (a.e.t.) (3-2 p)	Kırıkkale Büyük Anadoluspor	Istanbul
15:00	Kargı 80'; Bad 90+2'		Reis 73'; Sevinç 87'	Stadium: Tepecik Şenol Güneş

29 September 2021	Şile Yıldızspor	0 – 0 (a.e.t.) (4-2 p)	İskenderunspor	Istanbul
15:00				Stadium: Şile İlçe

29 September 2021	Hendekspor	1 – 3	52 Orduspor FK	Duzce
15:30	Türkeri 31'		Kahriman 80'; Kılıçaslan 81', 89'	Stadium: Düzce 18 Temmuz

29 September 2021	Esenler Erokspor	1 – 1 (a.e.t.) (6-7 p)	Osmaniyespor FK	Istanbul
19:00	Yılmaz 85'		Çukadar 75'	Stadium: Esenler Erokspor

30 September 2021	Mardin 1969 Spor	1 – 0	Gümüşhanespor	Mardin
13:00	Özdemir 22'			Stadium: Mardin 21 Kasım

30 September 2021	Iğdır Futbol Kulübü	0 – 0 (a.e.t.) (4-3 p)	Elazığ Karakoçan FK	Ankara
14:00				Stadium: Osmanlı

30 September 2021	Hacettepe	1 – 3 (a.e.t.)	Kahta 02 Spor	Ankara
14:30	Tuzcu 18'		Okur 65', 96', 105'	Stadium: Yeni Mahalle Hasan Doğan

30 September 2021	Belediye Kütahyaspor	0 – 0 (a.e.t.) (2-4 p)	Darıca Gençlerbirliği	Kutahya
15:30				Stadium: Kütahya Dumlupınar

30 September 2021	Kardemir Karabükspor	1 – 3 (a.e.t.)	Karşıyaka	Karabuk
19:00	Gündüz 56' (pen.)		Akyıldız 30'; Yilmaz 102', 118'	Stadium: Dr. Necmettin Şeyhoğlu

== Third round ==
5 Super League, 19 First League, 39 Second League and 25 Third League teams competed in this round. Seeds were applied in the single-leg round. Seeded teams played at home. The draw was made on 1 October 2021. The match schedules were announced on 8 October 2021. Kastamonuspor, which did not participate in the Ziraat Turkish Cup due to the negative effects of the flood disaster in Kastamonu, did not take part in the draw, while Giresunspor, which was matched with Kastamonuspor, automatically qualified for the next round. 32 seeded and 11 unseeded teams qualified for the next round. Biggest upset was Iğdır Futbol Kulübü (130) eliminating Eskişehirspor (42). Lowest-ranked team qualifying for the next round was Iğdır Futbol Kulübü (130). Highest-ranked team eliminated was BB Erzurumspor (21).

26 October 2021	MKE Ankaragücü	2 – 0	Somaspor	Ankara
13:00	Kwabena 13'; Çiftçi 54' (pen.)			Stadium: Eryaman

26 October 2021	Akhisarspor	4 – 2 (a.e.t.)	Bergama Belediyespor	Manisa
14:00	Kesgin 23'; Bayar 85'; Çelik 101', 120'		Kara 46', 54'	Stadium: Spor Toto Akhisar

26 October 2021	Boluspor	1 – 0	Çarşambaspor	Bolu
14:00	Kaba 87'			Stadium: Bolu Atatürk

26 October 2021	Eyüpspor	2 – 0	1928 Bucaspor	Istanbul
14:00	Yardımcı 12', 29'			Stadium: Eyüp

26 October 2021	Altay	5 – 1	Belediye Derincespor	Izmir
15:30	Kadah 34'; Rayyan 35', 59'; Paixao 47'; Thiam 87'		Uslu 43'; Çakır 56'	Stadium: Bornova Aziz Kocaoğlu

26 October 2021	Samsunspor	2 – 1	1922 Konyaspor	Samsun
18:00	Aşık 3' (o.g.); Bah 87'		Doğru 21' (pen.)	Stadium: Yeni 19 Mayıs

26 October 2021	Adanaspor	2 – 0	Adıyaman FK	Adana
20:45	Tetteh 40'; Kingsley 90'			Stadium: Yeni Adana

27 October 2021	24Erzincanspor	1 – 3	52 Orduspor FK	Erzincan
13:00	Demirci 90+3'		Kılıçaslan 45', 77', 84'	Stadium: Müstakil Atletizm Pisti Sahası

27 October 2021	Hekimoğlu Trabzon	1 – 1 (a.e.t.) (5–4 p)	Düzcespor	Trabzon
13:00	Kara 92'		Temizsoy 103'	Stadium: Ortahisar Yavuz Selim
	Penalties
	Aktaş (penalty scored); Yavuz (penalty scored); Demir (penalty scored); Gedik (penalty scored); Beyazit (penalty scored)		(penalty scored) Bilen; (penalty scored) Kasapoğlu; (penalty scored) Şirin; (penalty scored) Temizsoy; (penalty missed) Doğan

27 October 2021	Kocaelispor	2 – 0 (a.e.t.)	Bayburt Özel İdarespor	Kocaeli
13:00	Nalbant 98'; Keser 107'			Stadium: Kocaeli

27 October 2021	Van Spor FK	1 – 0	Zonguldak Kömürspor	Van
13:00	Akyüz 72'			Stadium: Van Atatürk

27 October 2021	Ankara Demirspor	2 – 1 (a.e.t.)	Yomraspor	Ankara
13:30	Kaya 90+4'; Akçay 106'		Yılmaz 69'	Stadium: TCDD Ankara Demirspor

27 October 2021	Etimesgut Belediyespor	0 – 1	Kahta 02 Spor	Ankara
13:30			Palta 90+2'	Stadium: Sincan 15 Temmuz Milli Birlik

27 October 2021	Keçiörengücü	0 – 0 (a.e.t.) (4–5 p)	Ağrı 1970 Spor	Ankara
13:30				Stadium: Aktepe
	Penalties
	Aral (penalty scored); Korkut (penalty scored); Özmen (penalty scored); Djibrilla (penalty scored); Çalış (penalty missed); Yazıcı (penalty missed)		(penalty scored) Selimoğlu; (penalty scored) Malcı; (penalty missed) Özkanca; (penalty scored) Gazanfer; (penalty scored) Morgül; (penalty scored) Demir

27 October 2021	Kırşehir Belediyespor	3 – 2	Darıca Gençlerbirliği	Kirsehir
13:30	Kaşıkara 70', 72'; Erçelik 84'		Özeren 37'; Tunç 82'	Stadium: Kırşehir Ahi

27 October 2021	Serik Belediyespor	7 – 0	Pazarspor	Antalya
13:30	Çakmak 3'; Bavuk 40', 59', 68', 71', 79'; Arslan 57'			Stadium: Serik İsmail Oğan

27 October 2021	Afjet Afyonspor	3 – 1	Sivas Belediyespor	Afyon
14:00	Tankul 46'; Aktay 68'; Odabaşı 90+4'		Bozkurt 16'	Stadium: Zafer

26 October 2021	Amed Sportif	3 – 2	Tarsus İdman Yurdu	Diyarbakir
14:00	Dinçer 81'; Güngör 90+2'; Deniz 90+4'		Çolak 9', 43'	Stadium: Diyarbakır

27 October 2021	Ankaraspor	2 – 0	İnegölspor	Ankara
14:00	Demir 66'; Fıstıkcı 74'			Stadium: Osmanlı

27 October 2021	Balıkesirspor	0 – 2	Alanya Kestelspor	Balikesir
14:00			Erkan 58'; Bulut 78'	Stadium: Balıkesir Atatürk

27 October 2021	Bandırmaspor	2 – 0	Çankaya FK	Balikesir
14:00	Avcı 81'; Manaj 84'			Stadium: Bandırma 17 Eylül

27 October 2021	Bodrumspor	3 – 1 (a.e.t.)	Isparta 32 Spor	Mugla
14:00	Ünsal 12', 104' (pen.); Eşer 120+3'		Geçgin 37'	Stadium: Bodrum İlçe

27 October 2021	Denizlispor	1 – 1 (a.e.t.) (4–3 p)	Şile Yıldızspor	Denizli
14:00	Schwechlen 47'		Sevindir 69' (pen.)	Stadium: Denizli Atatürk
	Penalties
	Aissati (penalty missed); Mayi (penalty scored); Çeçenoğlu (penalty scored); Onazi (penalty scored); Şişmanoğlu (penalty scored)		(penalty scored) Aygüneş; (penalty missed) Eken; (penalty missed) Güngör; (penalty scored) Yıldız; (penalty scored) Kurt

27 October 2021	Eskişehirspor	0 – 2	Iğdır Futbol Kulübü	Eskisehir
14:00			Reis 75' (pen.); Okumuş 90' (o.g.)	Stadium: Eskişehir Yeni

27 October 2021	Karacabey Belediyespor	1 – 2	Şanlıurfaspor	Bursa
14:00	Özgün 53'		Yöndem 36'; Şahin 59'	Stadium: Karacabey M. Fehmi Gerçeker

27 October 2021	Kırklarelispor	0 – 1	Osmaniyespor FK	Kirklareli
14:00			Koç 54'	Stadium: Kırklareli Atatürk

27 October 2021	Manisa FK	1 – 0	Fatsa Belediyespor	Manisa
14:00	Gakpa 14' (pen.)			Stadium: Spor Toto Akhisar

27 October 2021	Menemenspor	1 – 0	Karşıyaka	Izmir
14:00	Ndiaye 90'			Stadium: Yeni Buca

27 October 2021	Sarıyer	2 – 0	Edirnespor	Istanbul
14:00	Avcı 24', 49'			Stadium: Yusuf Ziya Öniş

27 October 2021	Turgutluspor	1 – 2	Mardin 1969 Spor	Manisa
14:00	Doğan 79'		Kazar 45+3'; İlter 51'	Stadium: Turgutlu 7 Eylül

27 October 2021	Uşakspor	1 – 1 (a.e.t.) (3–2 p)	Nevşehir Belediyespor	Usak
14:00	Özer 90+2'		Kotan 32'	Stadium: Uşak 1 Eylül
	Penalties
	Boztepe (penalty scored); Ozan (penalty scored); Türkkalesi (penalty scored); Kanarya (penalty missed)		(penalty scored) Işık; (penalty missed) Karaahmet; (penalty scored) Yılgın; (penalty missed) Birben; (penalty missed) Gür

27 October 2021	Çorum FK	0 – 2	Arnavutköy Belediye	Corum
14:00			Çelik 52'; Bayrak 90+4'	Stadium: Çorum Şehir

27 October 2021	İstanbulspor	5 – 0	Ergene Velimeşe	Istanbul
14:00	Uzunhan 3'; Sarıkaya 7'; Gültekin 21'; Öztürk 64'; Özer 85'			Stadium: Esenyurt Necmi Kadıoğlu

27 October 2021	BB Erzurumspor	0 – 0 (a.e.t.) (5–6 p)	Nazilli Belediyespor	Erzurum
15:30				Stadium: Erzurum Kazım Karabekir
	Penalties
	Alsan (penalty scored); Altıntaş (penalty scored); Kardeş (penalty scored); Karakullukçu (penalty scored); Olanare (penalty missed); Albayrak (penalty scored); Budak (penalty missed)		(penalty scored) Çapar; (penalty scored) Deniz; (penalty scored) Baykara; (penalty scored) Binici; (penalty missed) Estik; (penalty scored) Korkmaz; (penalty scored) Ersavaş

27 October 2021	Bursaspor	6 – 1	Ceyhanspor	Bursa
18:00	Aydoğan 4' (pen.), 27'; Ayaroğlu 17'; Kör 30'; Temel 76'; Karaca 85'		Emek 25'	Stadium: Bitci Timsah

27 October 2021	Kayserispor	3 – 0 (a.e.t.)	Artvin Hopaspor	Kayseri
20:45	Kayış 106' (o.g.); Cardoso 108'; Pektemek 116'			Stadium: Büyükşehir Belediyesi Kadir Has

28 October 2021	Ümraniyespor	3 – 1 (a.e.t.)	Kahramanmaraşspor	Istanbul
13:00	Nefiz 54'; Napoleoni 97'; Gültekin 119'		Özkan 72'	Stadium: Ümraniye Belediyesi İlçe

28 October 2021	Altınordu	5 – 3 (a.e.t.)	Büyükçekmece Tepecikspor	Izmir
14:00	İnce 19'; Kocaer 41'; Yener 89'; Destan 105'; Özek 118'		Ceylan 59'; Kargı 64'; Evirgen 68'	Stadium: Bornova Aziz Kocaoğlu

28 October 2021	Gençlerbirliği	3 – 1	Pendikspor	Ankara
14:00	Karakaş 52'; Salalik 59'; Altıparmak 89'		İlkin 76'	Stadium: Eryaman

28 October 2021	Tuzlaspor	0 – 1	68 Aksaray Belediyespor	Istanbul
14:00			Yiğit 30'	Stadium: Vefa

28 October 2021	Sakaryaspor	2 – 1	Karaköprü Belediyespor	Sakarya
15:30	Taşcı 23'; Odabaşoğlu 90+6'		Karadağ 37'	Stadium: Yeni Sakarya Atatürk

28 October 2021	Antalyaspor	5 – 0	Diyarbekirspor	Antalya
18:00	Ghacha 1'; Milosevic 5'; Bayrakdar 15', 20'; Mukairu 83'			Stadium: Antalya

28 October 2021	Adana Demirspor	3 – 0	Niğde Anadolu FK	Adana
20:45	Belhanda 11'; Assombalonga 69', 80'			Stadium: Yeni Adana

== Fourth round ==
15 Süper Lig, 15 First League, 15 Second League and 9 Third League teams compete in this round. Seeds were applied in the single-leg round. Seeded teams played at home. The draw was made on 2 November 2021. The match schedules were announced on 12 November 2021. 21 seeded and 6 unseeded teams qualified for the next round. Biggest upset was Mardin 1969 Spor (103) eliminating Gençlerbirliği (23). Lowest-ranked team qualifying for the next round was Mardin 1969 Spor (103). Highest-ranked team eliminated was Başakşehir FK (12).

30 November 2021	Bandırmaspor	5 – 0	Şanlıurfaspor	Balikesir
13:00	Manaj 8', 51', 81', 90+1'; Süleyman 39'			Stadium: Bandırma 17 Eylül

30 November 2021	Kasımpaşa	5 – 0	Alanya Kestelspor	Istanbul
13:00	Engin 12'; Eysseric 57'; Varga 60'; Serbest 77' (pen.); Ouanes 86'			Stadium: Recep Tayyip Erdoğan

30 November 2021	Gençlerbirliği	1 – 1 (a.e.t.) (2–4 p)	Mardin 1969 Spor	Ankara
14:00	Şahindere 20'		Aydoğdu 33'	Stadium: Eryaman
	Penalties
	Altıparmak (penalty missed); Gül (penalty scored); Bayır (penalty scored); Şahindere (penalty missed)		(penalty scored) Ok; (penalty scored) Bölük; (penalty scored) Yüce; (penalty scored) Kazar

30 November 2021	İstanbulspor	2 – 3	Afjet Afyonspor	Istanbul
14:00	Yeşil 64'; Sarıkaya 90+1'		Emeksiz 26'; Candoğan 30'; Şentürk 77'	Stadium: Esenyurt Necmi Kadıoğlu

30 November 2021	Altay	4 – 2	Manisa FK	Izmir
15:00	Rayyan 56', 69'; Paixao 74', 84'		Çetin 34'; Tabekou 41'	Stadium: Bornova Aziz Kocaoğlu

30 November 2021	Bursaspor	2 – 1 (a.e.t.)	Kırşehir Belediyespor	Bursa
15:00	Atasayar 82'; Kör 103'		Karabacak 37'	Stadium: Bitci Timsah

30 November 2021	İstanbul Başakşehir FK	1 – 1 (a.e.t.) (1–3 p)	Bodrumspor	Istanbul
17:00	Kutucu 24'		Bingöl 44'	Stadium: Başakşehir Fatih Terim
	Penalties
	Visca (penalty missed); Aleksic (penalty missed); Lima (penalty scored); Epureanu (penalty missed)		(penalty scored) Yatağan; (penalty scored) Güneş; (penalty missed) Çayir; (penalty scored) Imeri

30 November 2021	Adana Demirspor	5 – 0	Serik Belediyespor	Adana
19:00	Balotelli 10'; Akgün 14'; Bjarnason 26', 33'; Mimaroğlu 41'			Stadium: Yeni Adana

30 November 2021	Antalyaspor	4 – 0	Amed Sportif	Antalya
21:00	Bayrakdar 33', 85'; Ghacha 69'; Erdilman 81' (pen.)			Stadium: Antalya

1 December 2021	Çaykur Rizespor	0 – 1	Ankaraspor	Rize
13:00			Çetinkaya 49'	Stadium: Çaykur Didi

1 December 2021	Altınordu	1 – 3	68 Aksaray Belediyespor	Izmir
14:00	Yener 90+2'		Yiğit 17'; Tez 83'; Özel 90+5'	Stadium: Bornova Aziz Kocaoğlu

1 December 2021	Boluspor	4 – 2	52 Orduspor FK	Bolu
14:00	Köksal 3'; Novak 26'; Özyürek 82'; Kaba 90' (pen.)		Kahrıman 46'; Tütüncü 72'	Stadium: Bolu Atatürk

1 December 2021	Denizlispor	3 – 0	Ağrı 1970 Spor	Denizli
14:00	Böke 55'; Hamzaçebi 58'; Şişmanoğlu 83'			Stadium: Denizli Atatürk

1 December 2021	Samsunspor	4 – 0	Uşakspor	Samsun
14:00	Yaldır 40', 86'; Kılıç 55'; Çinari 70'			Stadium: Yeni 19 Mayıs

1 December 2021	Adanaspor	1 – 2	Kocaelispor	Adana
15:00	Tetteh 81'		Güçlü 18'; Erdinç 33'	Stadium: Yeni Adana

1 December 2021	Fatih Karagümrük	2 – 0	Sarıyer	Istanbul
15:00	Zukanovic 23'; Musa 66'			Stadium: Atatürk Olimpiyat

1 December 2021	Alanyaspor	6 – 0	Osmaniyespor FK	Antalya
17:00	Diedhiou 20'; Akbaba 54'; Eduardo 58'; Aydın 68'; Karaca 81'; Tetah 87'			Stadium: Bahçeşehir Okulları

1 December 2021	Kayserispor	4 – 0	Iğdır Futbol Kulübü	Kayseri
19:00	Demir 20'; Sazdağı 43'; Hosseini 52', 67'			Stadium: Büyükşehir Belediyesi Kadir Has

1 December 2021	Hatayspor	1 – 1 (a.e.t.) (5–4 p)	Eyüpspor	Hatay
21:00	Kurucuk 74'		Keskin 19'	Stadium: Yeni Hatay
	Penalties
	Diouf (penalty scored); Lobzhanidze (penalty missed); Adekugbe (penalty scored); Ribeiro (penalty scored); Traoré (penalty scored); Falette (penalty scored)		(penalty missed) Kaya; (penalty scored) Yılmaz; (penalty scored) Yardımcı; (penalty scored) Demir; (penalty scored) Alkılıç; (penalty missed) Keskin

2 December 2021	Giresunspor	4 – 2	Ankara Demirspor	Giresun
13:00	Champness 3', 57'; Nayir 14' (pen.); Orhan 85'		Özdemir 49'; Sivri 75'	Stadium: Çotanak Spor Kompleksi

2 December 2021	Ümraniyespor	3 – 2	Arnavutköy Belediye	Istanbul
13:00	Karagöz 65'; Gürbulak 73' del Valle 85'		Şahin 41'; Gölgeçen 69' (pen.)	Stadium: Ümraniye Belediyesi Şehir

2 December 2021	Menemenspor	3 – 0	Hekimoğlu Trabzon	Izmir
14:00	Gomes 2'; Özer 26'; Çakır 88' (pen.)			Stadium: Menemen İlçe

2 December 2021	MKE Ankaragücü	3 – 0	Nazilli Belediyespor	Ankara
15:00	Kwabena 58' (pen.), 64'; Çakmak 90+1'			Stadium: Eryaman

2 December 2021	Yeni Malatyaspor	3 – 1 (a.e.t.)	Akhisarspor	Malatya
15:00	Tetteh 95'; Haqi 114'; Chouiar 120+4'		Çelik 111' (pen.)	Stadium: Yeni Malatya

2 December 2021	Göztepe	5 – 0	Kahta 02 Spor	Izmir
17:00	Ndiaye 20', 55'; Demirtaş 42'; Arslanagic 79'; Baku 86'			Stadium: Gürsel Aksel

2 December 2021	Konyaspor	3 – 1	Van Spor FK	Konya
19:00	Gök 33' (o.g.); Uludağ 71'; Rahmanovic 76'		Küçükköylü 35'	Stadium: Medaş Konya Büyükşehir

2 December 2021	Gaziantep FK	3 – 1	Sakaryaspor	Gaziantep
21:00	Sagal 39'; Soyalp 43'; Figueiredo 45+2'		Özgün 28' (pen.)	Stadium: Kalyon

== Bracket ==
Fifth round
Beşiktaş	1
Altay	0
Göztepe	1
Samsunspor	0
Fenerbahçe (a.e.t.)	2
Afjet Afyonspor	0
Kayserispor	4
68 Aksaray Belediyespor	0
Galatasaray	3 (5)
Denizlispor (pen.)	3 (6)
Trabzonspor	1
Boluspor	0
Hatayspor	1
Menemenspor	0
Antalyaspor	2
Giresunspor	1
Yeni Malatyaspor	2
Bandırmaspor	3
Sivasspor	2
MKE Ankaragücü	1
Fatih Karagümrük	4
Bodrumspor	0
Konyaspor	2
Ümraniyespor	0
Alanyaspor	5
Mardin 1969 Spor	0
Adana Demirspor	3
Ankaraspor	2
Kasımpaşa (a.e.t.)	5
Kocaelispor	3
Gaziantep (pen.)	1 (5)
Bursaspor	1 (4)

Round of 16
Beşiktaş (pen.)	0 (3)
Göztepe	0 (1)
Fenerbahçe	0
Kayserispor	1
Denizlispor	1
Trabzonspor	2
Hatayspor	0
Antalyaspor	2
Bandırmaspor	2
Sivasspor	4
Fatih Karagümrük (a.e.t.)	5
Konyaspor	4
Alanyaspor (pen.)	1 (4)
Adana Demirspor	1 (2)
Kasımpaşa	1
Gaziantep	2

Quarterfinals
Beşiktaş	1
Kayserispor	2
Trabzonspor	2
Antalyaspor	0
Sivasspor	1
Fatih Karagümrük	0
Alanyaspor (a.e.t.)	2
Gaziantep	1

Semifinals
Kayserispor	0	4	4
Trabzonspor	1	2	3
Sivasspor	2	1	3
Alanyaspor	1	1	2

Finals
Kayserispor	2
Sivasspor (a.e.t.)	3

== Fifth round ==
18 Süper Lig, 9 First League, 3 Second League and 2 Third League teams compete in this round. Seeds were applied in the single-leg round. Seeded teams played at home. The draw was made on 3 December 2021. The match schedules were announced on 9 December 2021. 14 seeded and 2 unseeded teams qualified for the next round. Biggest upset was Denizlispor (24) eliminating Galatasaray (2). Lowest-ranked team qualifying for the next round was Bandırmaspor (32). Highest-ranked team eliminated was Galatasaray (2).

28 December 2021	Kasımpaşa	5–3 (a.e.t.)	Kocaelispor	Istanbul
13:00	Ben Ouanes 4'; Engin 50'; Serbest 101'; Çelebi 105' (o.g.); Erdoğan 116'		Keser 40' (pen.), 110'; Pereira 68'	Stadium: Recep Tayyip Erdoğan

28 December 2021	Hatayspor	1–0	Menemenspor	Hatay
15:00	Saint-Louis 49'			Stadium: Yeni Hatay

28 December 2021	Antalyaspor	2–1	Giresunspor	Antalya
17:00	Ghacha 27'; Naldo 87'		Nayir 56'	Stadium: Antalya

28 December 2021	Trabzonspor	1–0	Boluspor	Trabzon
18:30	Koita 48'			Stadium: Şenol Güneş

28 December 2021	Galatasaray	3–3 (a.e.t.) (5–6 p)	Denizlispor	Istanbul
21:00	Öztürk 29'; Dervişoğlu 49'; Mohamed 50'		Depe 9'; Darri 38'; Nelsson 90+9' (o.g.)	Stadium: Ali Sami Yen
	Penalties
	Nelsson (penalty scored); Dervişoğlu (penalty scored); Antalyalı (penalty scored); Mohamed (penalty scored); van Aanholt (penalty scored); Çağlayan (penalty missed)		(penalty scored) Süzen; (penalty scored) Gönülaçar; (penalty scored) Çeçenoğlu; (penalty scored) Özdemir; (penalty scored) Sünger; (penalty scored) Schwechlen

29 December 2021	Alanyaspor	5–0	Mardin 1969 Spor	Antalya
13:00	Babacar 17', 30', 48'; Akbaba 33' (pen.); Aydın 53'			Stadium: Bahçeşehir Okulları

29 December 2021	Fatih Karagümrük	4–0	Bodrumspor	Istanbul
15:00	Luckassen 11'; Borini 25'; Biglia 32'; Arveladze 43'			Stadium: Atatürk Olimpiyat

29 December 2021	Adana Demirspor	3–2	Ankaraspor	Adana
17:00	Akintola 11'; Akaydın 67'; Mimaroğlu 89'		Fıstıkcı 14'; Yemişci 30'	Stadium: Yeni Adana

29 December 2021	Göztepe	1–0	Samsunspor	Izmir
18:30	Akbunar 45'			Stadium: Gürsel Aksel

29 December 2021	Fenerbahçe	2–0 (a.e.t.)	Afjet Afyonspor	Istanbul
21:00	Valencia 94' (pen.); Osayi-Samuel 99'			Stadium: Ülker

30 December 2021	Yeni Malatyaspor	2–3	Bandırmaspor	Malatya
13:00	Eskihellaç 41'; Büyük 90'		Davas 9', 55'; Keny 37'	Stadium: Yeni Malatya

30 December 2021	Kayserispor	4–0	68 Aksaray Belediyespor	Kayseri
15:00	Akdağ 5' (pen.); Sazdağı 28'; Cardoso 84'; Gavranovic 88'			Stadium: Büyükşehir Belediyesi Kadir Has

30 December 2021	Konyaspor	2–0	Ümraniyespor	Konya
15:00	Michalak 49'; Hassan 58'			Stadium: Medaş Konya Büyükşehir

30 December 2021	Sivasspor	2–1	MKE Ankaragücü	Sivas
17:00	James 18', 56'		Çetin 73'	Stadium: 4 Eylül

30 December 2021	Gaziantep FK	1–1 (a.e.t.) (5–4 p)	Bursaspor	Gaziantep
18:30	Cihan 58'		Altıparmak 61'	Stadium: Kalyon
	Penalties
	Maxim (penalty scored); Kitsiou (penalty scored); Türk (penalty scored); Cihan (penalty scored); Erdoğan (penalty scored)		(penalty scored) Yüksek; (penalty scored) Şen; (penalty scored) Capan; (penalty scored) Akgün; (penalty missed) Kör

30 December 2021	Beşiktaş	1–0	Altay	Istanbul
21:00	Hutchinson 61'			Stadium: Vodafone Park

== Round of 16 ==
14 Süper Lig and 2 First League teams compete in this round. Seeds were applied in the single-leg round. The draw was made on 14 January 2022. The match schedules were announced on 20 January 2022. 6 seeded and 2 unseeded teams qualified for the next round. Biggest upset was Kayserispor (17) eliminating Fenerbahçe (3). Lowest-ranked team qualifying for the next round was Kayserispor (17). Highest-ranked team eliminated was Fenerbahçe (3).

8 February 2022	Kasımpaşa	1–2	Gaziantep FK	Istanbul
14:30	Ben Ouanes 31'	Report	Figueiredo 42'; Maxim 81' (pen.)	Stadium: Recep Tayyip Erdoğan

8 February 2022	Fatih Karagümrük	5–4 (a.e.t.)	Konyaspor	Istanbul
17:30	Mercan 7'; Musa 28'; Borini 67', 80' (pen.); Mor 101'	Report	Hassan 11', 21' (pen.); Amilton 60'; Çağıran 87'	Stadium: Atatürk Olimpiyat

8 February 2022	Fenerbahçe	0–1	Kayserispor	Istanbul
20:30		Report	Civelek 90+4'	Stadium: Ülker

9 February 2022	Bandırmaspor	2–4	Sivasspor	Bandırma
13:30	Ayçiçek 34'; Landel 54'	Report	Gradel 2', 45+3', 84'; Appindangoye 79'	Stadium: Bandırma 17 Eylül

9 February 2022	Hatayspor	0–2	Antalyaspor	Hatay
17:30		Report	Ndao 83'; Wright 87'	Stadium: Yeni Hatay

9 February 2022	Denizlispor	1–2	Trabzonspor	Denizli
20:30	Akdarı 58'	Report	Türkmen 8'; Kouassi 77'	Stadium: Denizli Atatürk

10 February 2022	Alanyaspor	1–1 (a.e.t.) (4–2 p)	Adana Demirspor	Antalya
17:30	Eduardo 22'	Report	Öztümer 38'	Stadium: Bahçeşehir Okulları
	Penalties
	Eduardo (penalty scored); Candeias (penalty scored); Milunovic (penalty missed); Akbaba (penalty scored); Novais (penalty scored)		(penalty scored) Assombalonga; (penalty missed) Güler; (penalty scored) Inler; (penalty missed) Vargas

10 February 2022	Beşiktaş	0–0 (a.e.t.) (3–1 p)	Göztepe	Istanbul
20:30		Report		Stadium: Vodafone Park
	Penalties
	Pjanic (penalty missed); Batshuayi (penalty scored); Hutchinson (penalty scored); Vida (penalty scored)		(penalty missed) Di Santo; (penalty missed) Emir; (penalty scored) Angel; (penalty missed) Lourency

== Quarter-finals ==
8 Super League teams competed in this round. Seeds were applied in the single-leg round. The draw was made on 11 February 2022. The match schedules were announced on 16 February 2022.

=== Teams ===
Seeded	League	Rank	Unseeded	League	Rank
Beşiktaş	SL	1	Fatih Karagümrük	SL	8
Trabzonspor	SL	4	Gaziantep FK	SL	9
Sivasspor	SL	5	Antalyaspor	SL	16
Alanyaspor	SL	7	Kayserispor	SL	17

=== Results ===
1 March 2022	Trabzonspor	2–0	Antalyaspor	Trabzon
20:30	Višća 12'; Özdemir 89'			Stadium: Şenol Güneş

2 March 2022	Sivasspor	1–0	Fatih Karagümrük	Sivas
17:00	Yatabaré 69'			Stadium: Yeni 4 Eylül

2 March 2022	Beşiktaş	1–2	Kayserispor	Istanbul
20:30	Rosier 43'		Gavranovic 6'; Cardoso 65'	Stadium: Vodafone Park

3 March 2022	Alanyaspor	2–1 (a.e.t.)	Gaziantep FK	Antalya
20:30	Bingöl 74'; Aydın 102'		Djilobodji 90+1'	Stadium: Bahçeşehir Okulları

== Semi-finals ==
The match schedules for the first leg were announced on 19 March 2022. The match schedules for the second leg were announced on 28 April 2022.

=== Summary table ===
Team 1	Agg.	Team 2	1st leg	2nd leg
Trabzonspor	3–4	Kayserispor	1–0	2–4
Alanyaspor	2–3	Sivasspor	1–2	1–1

=== First leg ===
19 April 2022	Trabzonspor	1–0	Kayserispor	Trabzon
20:30	Cornelius 87'	Report		Stadium: Şenol Güneş; Referee: Atilla Karaoğlan

20 April 2022	Alanyaspor	1–2	Sivasspor	Antalya
20:30	Akbaba 6'	Report	Yatabaré 32'; Kesgin 90+2'	Stadium: Bahçeşehir Okulları; Referee: Ali Şansalan

=== Second leg ===
10 May 2022	Kayserispor	4–2	Trabzonspor	Kayseri
20:30	Başsan 48', 90+6'; Hosseini 59'; Thiam 90+1'	Report	Nwakaeme 3'; Bakasetas 82'	Stadium: Büyükşehir Belediyesi Kadir Has; Referee: Halil Umut Meler

11 May 2022	Sivasspor	1–1	Alanyaspor	Sivas
20:30	Arslan 88'	Report	Diédhiou 78'	Stadium: 4 Eylül; Referee: Atilla Karaoğlan

== Final ==
The final match schedule and location were announced on 4 April 2022.

26 May 2022
20:45 TRT

Kayserispor	2–3 (a.e.t.)	Sivasspor
Civelek 33'; Parlak 107'	Report	Appindangoyé 60'; Gradel 95'; Konaté 113'

Atatürk Olimpiyat, Istanbul
Attendance: 27,798
Referee: Halil Umut Meler

== Top scorers ==
Rank	Player	Club	Goals
1	(Kosovo) Arb Manaj	Bandırmaspor	5
1	(Turkey) Fuat Bavuk	Serik Belediyespor	5
1	(Turkey) Şükrü Kaan Kılıçaslan	52 Orduspor FK	5
1	(Turkey) Emre Okur	Kahta 02 Spor	5
2	(Turkey) Gökdeniz Bayrakdar	Antalyaspor	4
2	(Egypt) Ahmed Yasser Rayyan	Altay	4
2	(Ivory Coast) Max Gradel	Sivasspor	4
3	(Senegal) Khouma Babacar	Alanyaspor	3
3	(Algeria) Houssam Eddine Ghacha	Antalyaspor	3
3	(Italy) Fabio Borini	Fatih Karagümrük	3
3	(Turkey) Cihat Çelik	Akhisarspor	3
3	(Turkey) Benhur Keser	Kocaelispor	3
3	(Ghana) Owusu Kwabena	MKE Ankaragücü	3
3	(Portugal) Marco Paixão	Altay	3
3	(Egypt) Ahmed Hassan	Konyaspor	3
3	(Tunisia) Mortadha Ben Ouanes	Kasımpaşa	3
3	(Portugal) Miguel Cardoso	Kayserispor	3
3	(Turkey) Emre Akbaba	Alanyaspor	3
3	(Iran) Majid Hosseini	Kayserispor	3

== Seedings ==
Seed	Team	Entering in Round	2021-22	2020-21	Rank (Pts; GD)	Seed	Team	Entering in Round	2021-22	2020-21	Rank (Pts; GD)	Seed	Team	Entering in Round	2021-22	2020-21	Rank (Pts; GD)
1	Beşiktaş	5th	SL	SL	1	46	Kırklarelispor	3rd	2L	2L	4 (70)	91	İçel İdman Yurdu	2nd	3L	3L	3 (52)
2	Galatasaray	5th	SL	SL	2	47	Ankara Demirspor	3rd	2L	2L	4 (65)	92	68 Aksaray Belediyespor	2nd	3L	3L	4 (53; +13)
3	Fenerbahçe	5th	SL	SL	3	48	Vanspor FK	3rd	2L	2L	5 (69)	93	Ofspor	2nd	3L	3L	4 (53; +12)
4	Trabzonspor	5th	SL	SL	4	49	24Erzincanspor	3rd	2L	2L	5 (62)	94	Yomraspor	2nd	3L	3L	4 (50)
5	Sivasspor	5th	SL	SL	5	50	Bodrumspor	3rd	2L	2L	6 (63)	95	1954 Kelkit Belediyespor	2nd	3L	3L	5 (51)
6	Hatayspor	4th	SL	SL	6	51	Sarıyer	3rd	2L	2L	6 (61)	96	İskenderunspor	2nd	3L	3L	5 (50)
7	Alanyaspor	4th	SL	SL	7	52	Etimesgut Belediyespor	3rd	2L	2L	7 (61)	97	Çatalcaspor	2nd	3L	3L	5 (49)
8	Fatih Karagümrük	4th	SL	SL	8	53	Afjet Afyonspor	3rd	2L	2L	7 (57)	98	Arnavutköy Belediye	2nd	3L	3L	5 (48)
9	Gaziantep FK	4th	SL	SL	9	54	Amed Sportif	3rd	2L	2L	8 (57)	99	Beyoğlu Yeniçarşıspor	2nd	3L	3L	6 (49)
10	Göztepe	4th	SL	SL	10	55	Karacabey Belediyespor	3rd	2L	2L	8 (56)	100	Çarşambaspor	2nd	3L	3L	6 (47)
11	Konyaspor	4th	SL	SL	11	56	Uşakspor	3rd	2L	2L	9 (55)	101	Bayrampaşa	2nd	3L	3L	6 (45; +7)
12	İstanbul Başakşehir FK	4th	SL	SL	12	57	Turgutluspor	3rd	2L	2L	9 (54)	102	Edirnespor	2nd	3L	3L	6 (45; +3)
13	Çaykur Rizespor	4th	SL	SL	13	58	Çorum FK	3rd	2L	2L	10 (54)	103	Mardin 1969 Spor	2nd	3L	3L	7 (48)
14	Kasımpaşa	4th	SL	SL	14	59	Serik Belediyespor	3rd	2L	2L	10 (53)	104	52 Orduspor FK	2nd	3L	3L	7 (44; +11)
15	Yeni Malatyaspor	4th	SL	SL	15	60	Pendikspor	3rd	2L	2L	11 (52)	105	Karşıyaka	2nd	3L	3L	7 (44; -3)
16	Antalyaspor	3rd	SL	SL	16	61	Kahramanmaraşspor	3rd	2L	2L	11 (37)	106	Belediye Derincespor	2nd	3L	3L	7 (40)
17	Kayserispor	3rd	SL	SL	17	62	Pazarspor	3rd	2L	2L	12 (50)	107	Büyükçekmece Tepecikspor	2nd	3L	3L	8 (44)
18	Adana Demirspor	3rd	SL	1L	1	63	Zonguldak Kömürspor	3rd	2L	2L	12 (36)	108	Altındağspor	2nd	3L	3L	8 (43)
19	Giresunspor	3rd	SL	1L	2	64	Tarsus İdman Yurdu	3rd	2L	2L	13 (49)	109	Alanya Kestelspor	2nd	3L	3L	8 (42)
20	Altay	3rd	SL	1L	5	65	Niğde Anadolu FK	3rd	2L	2L	13 (36)	110	Artvin Hopaspor	2nd	3L	3L	8 (39)
21	BB Erzurumspor	3rd	1L	SL	18	66	Bayburt Özel İdarespor	3rd	2L	2L	14 (48)	111	Darıca Gençlerbirliği	2nd	3L	3L	9 (43; +2)
22	MKE Ankaragücü	3rd	1L	SL	19	67	İnegölspor	3rd	2L	2L	14 (35)	112	Şile Yıldızspor	2nd	3L	3L	9 (43; -1)
23	Gençlerbirliği	3rd	1L	SL	20	68	Sivas Belediyespor	3rd	2L	2L	15 (46)	113	Karaköprü Belediyespor	2nd	3L	3L	9 (40)
24	Denizlispor	3rd	1L	SL	21	69	Şanlıurfaspor	3rd	2L	2L	15 (34)	114	Fatsa Belediyespor	2nd	3L	3L	9 (38)
25	Samsunspor	3rd	1L	1L	3	70	1922 Konyaspor	3rd	2L	2L	16 (42)	115	Ağrı 1970 Spor	2nd	3L	3L	10 (42)
26	İstanbulspor	3rd	1L	1L	4	71	Ergene Velimeşe	3rd	2L	2L	16 (31)	116	Elazığ Karakoçan FK	2nd	3L	3L	10 (41)
27	Altınordu	3rd	1L	1L	6	72	Kastamonuspor	3rd	2L	2L	17	117	Kırıkkale Büyük Anadoluspor	2nd	3L	3L	10 (40)
28	Keçiörengücü	3rd	1L	1L	7	73	Somaspor	3rd	2L	3L	1 (69)	118	Kızılcabölükspor	2nd	3L	3L	10 (37)
29	Ümraniyespor	3rd	1L	1L	8	74	Diyarbekirspor	3rd	2L	3L	1 (68)	119	Osmaniyespor FK	2nd	3L	3L	11 (41; +3)
30	Tuzlaspor	3rd	1L	1L	9	75	Nazilli Belediyespor	3rd	2L	3L	1 (63)	120	Ceyhanspor	2nd	3L	3L	11 (41; -21)
31	Bursaspor	3rd	1L	1L	10	76	Adıyaman SK	3rd	2L	3L	1 (57)	121	Bergama Belediyespor	2nd	3L	3L	11 (39)
32	Bandırmaspor	3rd	1L	1L	11	77	1928 Bucaspor	3rd	2L	3L	2	122	Nevşehir Belediyespor	2nd	3L	3L	11 (34)
33	Boluspor	3rd	1L	1L	12	78	Isparta 32 Spor	3rd	2L	3L	4	123	Erbaaspor	2nd	3L	3L	12 (40)
34	Balıkesirspor	3rd	1L	1L	13	79	Gümüşhanespor	2nd	3L	2L	17	124	Siirt İl Özel İdare	1st	3L	3L	12 (39)
35	Adanaspor	3rd	1L	1L	14	80	Elazığspor	2nd	3L	2L	18 (33)	125	Kahta 02 Spor	1st	3L	3L	12 (38)
36	Menemenspor	3rd	1L	1L	15	81	Sancaktepe FK	2nd	3L	2L	18 (26)	126	Çankaya FK	1st	3L	3L	12 (34)
37	Eyüpspor	3rd	1L	2L	1 (92)	82	Hacettepe	2nd	3L	2L	19 (25)	127	Batman Petrolspor	1st	3L	3L	13 (39)
38	Manisa FK	3rd	1L	2L	1 (84)	83	Başkent Gözgözler Akademi FK	2nd	3L	2L	19 (24)	128	Modafen	1st	3L	3L	13 (38)
39	Kocaelispor	3rd	1L	2L	3	84	Kardemir Karabükspor	2nd	3L	2L	20	129	Karaman Belediyespor	1st	3L	3L	13 (37)
40	Akhisarspor	3rd	2L	1L	16	85	Esenler Erokspor	2nd	3L	3L	2 (64)	130	Iğdır Futbol Kulübü	1st	3L	AL	1 (14)
41	Ankaraspor	3rd	2L	1L	17	86	Belediye Kütahyaspor	2nd	3L	3L	2 (62)	131	Hendekspor	1st	3L	AL	1 (12)
42	Eskişehirspor	3rd	2L	1L	18	87	Bursa Yıldırımspor	2nd	3L	3L	2 (56)	132	Orduspor 1967 SK	1st	3L	AL	1 (11)
43	Sakaryaspor	3rd	2L	2L	2 (75)	88	Fethiyespor	2nd	3L	3L	3 (58)	133	Kuşadasıspor	1st	3L	AL	2
44	Hekimoğlu Trabzon	3rd	2L	2L	2 (71)	89	Yeşilyurt Belediyespor	2nd	3L	3L	3 (56)						
45	Kırşehir Belediyespor	3rd	2L	2L	3	90	Düzcespor	2nd	3L	3L	3 (54)						
