= 2022–23 Gençlerbirliği S.K. season =

Gençlerbirliği S.K.
2022–23 season
- Manager: Metin Diyadin (until 11 September); Medet Coşkun (caretaker, 15–27 September); Taşkın Aksoy (27 September–1 November); Medet Coşkun (caretaker, 1–14 November); Mustafa Dalci (15 November–4 April); Sinan Kaloğlu (from 5 April)
- Stadium: Eryaman Stadium
- TFF First League: 15th
- Turkish Cup: Fifth round

The 2022–23 season was the 100th season in the existence of Gençlerbirliği S.K. and the club's second consecutive season in the second division of Turkish football. In addition to the domestic league, Gençlerbirliği S.K. participated in this season's edition of the Turkish Cup. The season covered the period from 1 July 2022 to 30 June 2023.

== Players ==
=== First-team squad ===
As of 5 March 2023

Note: Flags indicate national team as defined under FIFA eligibility rules; some limited exceptions apply. Players may hold more than one non-FIFA nationality.

| No. | Pos. | Nation | Player |
|---|---|---|---|
| 1 | GK | TUR | Nurullah Aslan (on loan from Samsunspor) |
| 3 | DF | TUR | Musa Şahindere |
| 5 | DF | TUR | Mert Kula |
| 8 | FW | MAR | Moha Rharsalla |
| 9 | FW | TUR | İlker Karakaş |
| 10 | MF | TUR | Serdarcan Eralp |
| 11 | FW | TUR | Gökhan Altıparmak |
| 17 | DF | TUR | Yasin Güreler |
| 20 | DF | TUR | Abdullah Şahindere |
| 23 | GK | AUT | Philipp Alexander Angeler (on loan from Tuzlaspor) |
| 24 | DF | TUR | Alperen Babacan |
| 25 | MF | TUR | Eralp Aydın |
| 26 | GK | TUR | Ebrar Yiğit Aydın |
| 28 | FW | TUR | Baran Başyiğit |
| 29 | FW | CRO | Ivan Ikić (on loan from Sarajevo) |
| 30 | MF | TUR | Erkan Eyibil (on loan from Antalyaspor) |
| 38 | FW | TUR | Hayrullah Erkip (on loan from Kayserispor) |
| 39 | FW | MTN | Souleymane Doukara |
| 41 | GK | TUR | Onur Alp Sarman |
| 42 | MF | POR | Tiago Rodrigues |

| No. | Pos. | Nation | Player |
|---|---|---|---|
| 44 | MF | GUI | Sekoua Tidiany Bangoura (on loan from İstanbul Başakşehir) |
| 50 | FW | ECU | Jaime Ayoví |
| 57 | MF | TUR | Enes Keskin (on loan from Pendikspor) |
| 60 | DF | TUR | Özgür Çek |
| 62 | MF | TUR | Özkan Yiğiter (on loan from Sivasspor) |
| 70 | FW | TUR | Mete Kaan Demir (on loan from Eyüpspor) |
| 72 | FW | TUR | Muhammed Himmet Ertürk |
| 77 | DF | TUR | Uğur Akdemir |
| 87 | MF | TUR | Abdullah Durak |
| 89 | FW | ROU | Gabriel Torje (captain) |
| 97 | DF | MAD | Thomas Fontaine |
| 99 | GK | TUR | Atalay Gökçe |
| — | GK | TUR | Ahmet Cevat Varol |
| — | DF | TUR | Ahmet Buğra Güven |
| — | DF | TUR | Muhammet Baha Yetim |
| — | MF | TUR | Adar Aygür |
| — | MF | NGA | Chukwuma Akabueze |
| — | MF | TUR | Harun Batuhan Ceyhan |
| — | MF | TUR | Rahman Buğra Çağıran (on loan from Yeni Malatyaspor) |

=== Out on loan ===
Note: Flags indicate national team as defined under FIFA eligibility rules; some limited exceptions apply. Players may hold more than one non-FIFA nationality.

| No. | Pos. | Nation | Player |
|---|---|---|---|
| — | GK | TUR | Emin Emir Kavaşoğlu (at Hacettepe 1945 until 30 June 2023) |
| — | DF | TUR | Batuhan Uçan (at 1954 Kelkit Belediyespor until 30 June 2023) |
| — | MF | TUR | Abdussamet Yılmaz (at Hacettepe 1945 until 30 June 2023) |
| — | MF | TUR | Ataberk Gök (at Edirnespor until 30 June 2023) |
| — | MF | TUR | Batuhan Özdemir (at Erbaaspor until 30 June 2023) |
| — | MF | TUR | Mustafa Yorulmaz (at 1954 Kelkit Belediyespor until 30 June 2023) |
| — | MF | UKR | Oleksandr Byelyayev (at Lviv until 30 June 2023) |

| No. | Pos. | Nation | Player |
|---|---|---|---|
| — | MF | TUR | Seyit Ali Kahya (at Hacettepe 1945 until 30 June 2023) |
| — | FW | TUR | Ahmet Arda Tuzcu (at Hacettepe 1945 until 30 June 2023) |
| — | FW | TUR | Kağan Özkan (at Hacettepe 1945 until 30 June 2023) |
| — | FW | TUR | Osman Emirkan Demir (at Hacettepe 1945 until 30 June 2023) |
| — | FW | TUR | Zafer Göktuğ Erdem (at Hacettepe 1945 until 30 June 2023) |
| — | MF | TUR | Ulusoy Mert Kabasakal (at Hacettepe 1945 until 30 June 2024) |

== Pre-season and friendlies ==
Win Draw Loss Fixtures

== Competitions ==
=== Overall record ===
| Competition | First match | Last match | Starting round | Final position | Record | | | | | | | |
| Competition | First match | Last match | Starting round | Final position | Pld | W | D | L | GF | GA | GD | Win % |
|---|---|---|---|---|---|---|---|---|---|---|---|---|
| TFF First League | 13 August 2022 | 21 May 2023 | Matchday 1 | 15th | 36 | 10 | 8 | 18 | 46 | 55 | −9 | 27.78 |
| Turkish Cup | 20 October 2022 | 22 December 2022 | Third round | Fifth round | 3 | 2 | 0 | 1 | 4 | 3 | +1 | 66.67 |
| Total | | | | | 39 | 12 | 8 | 19 | 50 | 58 | −8 | 30.77 |

Last updated: August 2022
Source: Competitions

=== TFF First League ===
==== League table ====
| Pos | Team | Pld | W | D | L | GF | GA | GD | Pts | Qualification or relegation |
|---|---|---|---|---|---|---|---|---|---|---|
| 13 | Erzurumspor (Note: Erzurumspor have been deducted 3 points by the Club Licensing Board for failing to meet the licensing requirements.) | 36 | 11 | 9 | 16 | 43 | 48 | −5 | 39 | |
| 14 | Tuzlaspor | 36 | 11 | 5 | 20 | 42 | 52 | −10 | 38 (Note: Head-to-head points: Gençlerbirliği 1–2 Tuzlaspor, Tuzlaspor 1–0 Gençlerbirliği) | |
| 15 | Gençlerbirliği | 36 | 10 | 8 | 18 | 46 | 55 | −9 | 38 | |
| 16 | Altınordu (R) | 36 | 9 | 8 | 19 | 41 | 57 | −16 | 35 | Relegation to the TFF Second League |
| 17 | Adanaspor (Note: Adanaspor withdrew from the league following the 2023 Turkey–Syria earthquake and were not relegated at the end of the season.) | 36 | 6 | 7 | 23 | 32 | 76 | −44 | 25 | Withdrew |

Source: TFF
Rules for classification: 1) Points; 2) Head-to-head points; 3) Head-to-head goal difference; 4) Head-to-head goals scored; 5) Goal difference; 6) Goals scored
(R) Relegated

==== Results summary ====
| Overall | | | | | | | | Home | | | | | | Away | | | | | |
| Pld | W | D | L | GF | GA | GD | Pts | W | D | L | GF | GA | GD | W | D | L | GF | GA | GD |
|---|---|---|---|---|---|---|---|---|---|---|---|---|---|---|---|---|---|---|---|
| 36 | 10 | 8 | 18 | 46 | 55 | −9 | 38 | 6 | 3 | 9 | 26 | 28 | −2 | 4 | 5 | 9 | 20 | 27 | −7 |

Source: Spor Toto 1. Lig

==== Results by round ====
| Round | 1 | 2 | 3 | 4 | 5 | 6 | 7 | 8 | 9 | 10 | 11 | 12 | 13 | 14 | 15 | 16 | 17 | 18 | 19 | 20 | 21 | 22 | 23 | 24 | 25 | 26 | 27 | 28 | 29 | 30 | 31 | 32 | 33 | 34 | 35 | 36 | 37 | 38 |
|---|---|---|---|---|---|---|---|---|---|---|---|---|---|---|---|---|---|---|---|---|---|---|---|---|---|---|---|---|---|---|---|---|---|---|---|---|---|---|
| Ground | H | A | H | A | H | A | | A | H | A | H | A | H | A | H | A | H | A | H | A | H | A | H | A | H | | H | A | H | A | H | A | H | A | H | A | H | A |
| Result | D | W | L | D | L | D | B | L | L | L | L | D | L | L | L | L | L | L | L | L | W | W | W | L | D | B | L | D | W | L | W | W | D | L | W | W | W | D |
| Position | | | | | | | | | | | | | | | | | | | | | | | | | | | | | | | | | | | | | | |

Source: Spor Toto 1. Lig
A = Away; H = Home; W = Win; D = Draw; L = Loss

==== Matches ====
The league schedule was released on 5 July.

| 13 August 2022 1 | Gençlerbirliği | 3–3 | Altınordu |

| 19 August 2022 2 | Boluspor | 1–2 | Gençlerbirliği |

| 28 August 2022 3 | Gençlerbirliği | 1–2 | Pendikspor |

| 2 September 2022 4 | Göztepe | 0–0 | Gençlerbirliği |

| 10 September 2022 5 | Gençlerbirliği | 1–2 | Tuzlaspor |

| 17 September 2022 6 | Denizlispor | 2–2 | Gençlerbirliği |

| 7 | Bye |

| 8 October 2022 8 | Samsunspor | 2–0 | Gençlerbirliği |

| 15 October 2022 9 | Gençlerbirliği | 0–2 | Ankara Keçiörengücü |

| 24 October 2022 10 | Adanaspor | 2–1 | Gençlerbirliği |

| 31 October 2022 11 | Gençlerbirliği | 1–3 | Manisa |

| 5 November 2022 12 | Yeni Malatyaspor | 2–2 | Gençlerbirliği |

| 13 November 2022 13 | Gençlerbirliği | 0–2 | Eyüpspor |

| 21 November 2022 14 | Altay | 1–0 | Gençlerbirliği |

| 26 November 2022 15 | Gençlerbirliği | 1–3 | Çaykur Rizespor |

| 3 December 2022 16 | Bodrumspor | 2–0 | Gençlerbirliği |

| 11 December 2022 17 | Gençlerbirliği | 1–2 | Erzurumspor |

| 17 December 2022 18 | Sakaryaspor | 2–1 | Gençlerbirliği |

| 25 December 2022 19 | Gençlerbirliği | 2–5 | Bandırmaspor |

| 15 January 2023 20 | Altınordu | 2–1 | Gençlerbirliği |

| 21 January 2023 21 | Gençlerbirliği | 5–1 | Boluspor |

| 28 January 2023 22 | Pendikspor | 0–1 | Gençlerbirliği |

| 5 February 2023 23 | Gençlerbirliği | 1–0 | Göztepe |

| 4 March 2023 24 | Tuzlaspor | 1–0 | Gençlerbirliği |

| 8 March 2023 25 | Gençlerbirliği | 0–0 | Denizlispor |

| 26 | Bye |

| 18 March 2023 27 | Gençlerbirliği | 0–1 | Samsunspor |

| 25 March 2023 28 | Ankara Keçiörengücü | 2–2 | Gençlerbirliği |

| 29 March 2023 29 | Gençlerbirliği | 3–0 | Adanaspor |

| 2 April 2023 30 | Manisa | 2–1 | Gençlerbirliği |

| 9 April 2023 31 | Gençlerbirliği | 3–0 | Yeni Malatyaspor |

| 12 April 2023 32 | Eyüpspor | 0–2 | Gençlerbirliği |

| 17 April 2023 33 | Gençlerbirliği | 0–0 | Altay |

| 23 April 2023 34 | Çaykur Rizespor | 5–3 | Gençlerbirliği |

| 28 April 2023 35 | Gençlerbirliği | 2–1 | Bodrumspor |

| 7 May 2023 36 | Erzurumspor | 0–1 | Gençlerbirliği |

| 16 May 2023 37 | Gençlerbirliği | 2–1 | Sakaryaspor |

| 21 May 2023 38 | Bandırmaspor | 1–1 | Gençlerbirliği |

=== Turkish Cup ===
| 20 October 2022 Third round | Gençlerbirliği | 3–1 (a.e.t.) | Niğde Anadolu FK |

| 9 November 2022 Fourth round | Gençlerbirliği | 1–0 | Bayburt Özel İdare Spor |

| 22 December 2022 Fifth round | Kayserispor | 2–0 | Gençlerbirliği |
