= Hakan Demir =

Hakan Demir may refer to:

- Hakan Demir (coach) (born 1968), Turkish basketball coach
- Hakan Demir (footballer) (born 1998), Turkish footballer
- Hakan Demir (politician) (born 1984), German politician
