= Soner Dikmen =

Turkish footballer (born 1993)

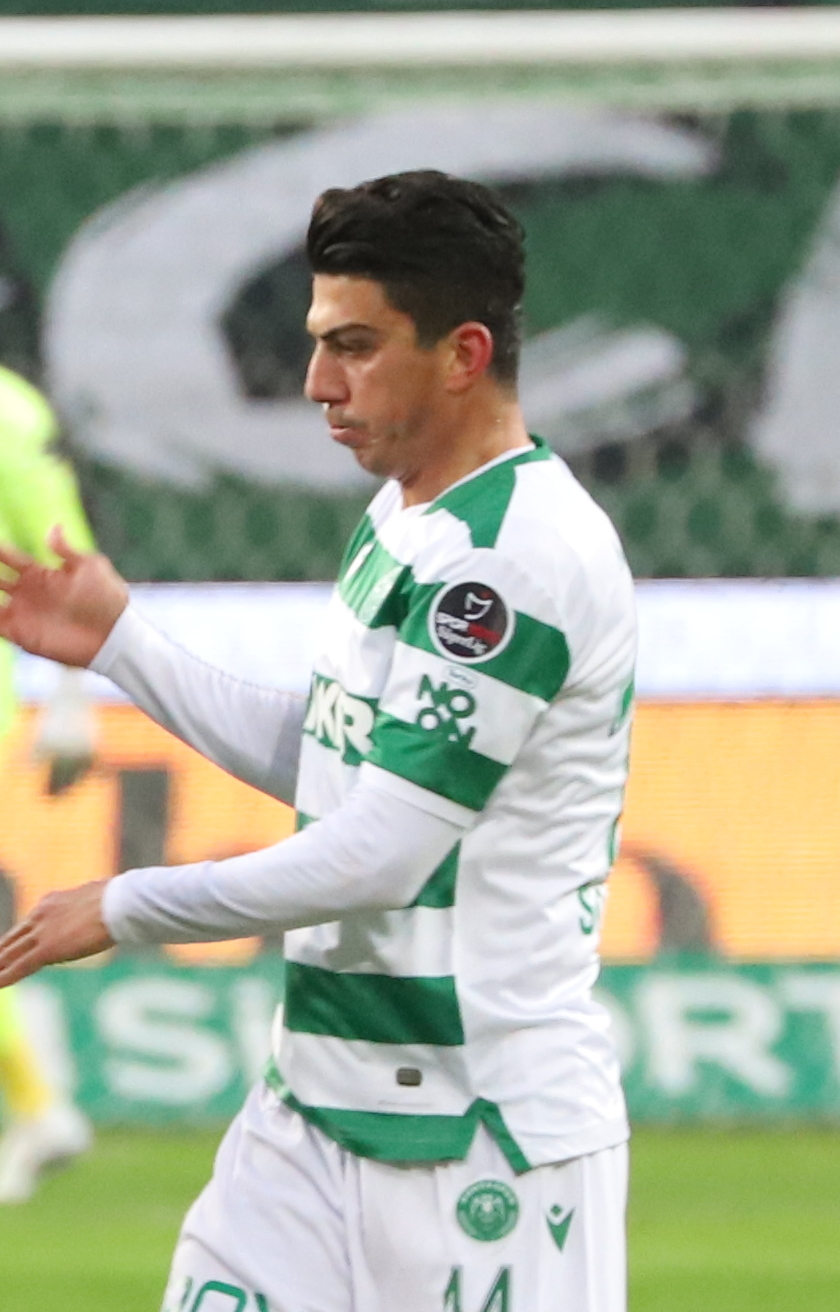
- Dikmen in 2021

Personal information
- Date of birth: 1 September 1993 (age 33)
- Place of birth: Altındağ, Turkey
- Height: 1.79 m (5 ft 10 in)
- Position: Midfielder

Team information
- Current team: Antalyaspor
- Number: 6

Youth career
- 2005–2007: Gençlerbirliği
- 2007–2011: Hacettepe
- 2011–2012: Gençlerbirliği

Senior career*
Years	Team	Apps	(Gls)
2012–2017	Hacettepe	109	(11)
2016–2017	→ Göztepe (loan)	9	(0)
2017–2021	Gençlerbirliği	42	(1)
2017–2018	→ Hacettepe (loan)	31	(12)
2018–2019	→ Kastamonuspor 1966 (loan)	33	(3)
2021–2024	Konyaspor	106	(9)
2024–	Antalyaspor	57	(8)
- * Club domestic league appearances and goals as of 10 June 2026

Soner Dikmen (born 1 September 1993) is a Turkish professional footballer who plays as a midfielder for Antalyaspor in the Turkish Süper Lig.

== Professional career ==
Dikmen made his professional debut for Gençlerbirliği in a 4-0 Süper Lig loss to Gazişehir Gaziantep F.K. on 26 August 2019.
