= Ömürcan Artan =

Turkish footballer

Personal information
- Date of birth: 27 July 1999 (age 27)
- Place of birth: Yenimahalle, Turkey
- Height: 1.79 m (5 ft 10 in)
- Position: Right-back

Team information
- Current team: Batman Petrolspor
- Number: 27

Youth career
- 2011–2014: Mamak
- 2014–2016: Başkent Edaşspor
- 2016–2019: Gençlerbirliği

Senior career*
Years	Team	Apps	(Gls)
2019–2022	Gençlerbirliği	43	(1)
2019–2020	→ Hacettepe (loan)	23	(1)
2022–2025	Gaziantep	24	(0)
2023	→ Tuzlaspor (loan)	9	(0)
2025–2026	Boluspor	26	(1)
2026–	Batman Petrolspor	0	(0)
- * Club domestic league appearances and goals as of 6 May 2026

Ömürcan Artan (born 27 July 1999) is a Turkish football player who plays as a right-back for Batman Petrolspor in the TFF 1. Lig.

== Professional career ==
Artan is a youth product of Mamak, Başkent Edaşspor, and Gençlerbirliği. He signed his first contract with Gençlerbirliği in 2019 before immediately joining Hacettepe in a year long loan. He returned to Gençlerbirliği in 2020, and started playing with their senior squad in the Süper Lig. Artan made his professional debut with Gençlerbirliği in a 1-1 Süper Lig tie with MKE Ankaragücü on 20 December 2020.

On 27 June 2022, Artan transferred to Gaziantep signing a 4-year contract.
