= Mustafa Hüseyin Seyhan =

Turkish footballer

Personal information
- Date of birth: 23 April 1996 (age 30)
- Place of birth: Altındağ, Turkey
- Height: 1.76 m (5 ft 9 in)
- Position: Midfielder

Team information
- Current team: Güzide Gebzespor
- Number: 12

Youth career
- 2007–2015: Gençlerbirliği

Senior career*
Years	Team	Apps	(Gls)
2015–2019	Hacettepe	38	(2)
2016	→ Çankaya (loan)	19	(1)
2017–2018	→ Çankaya (loan)	8	(1)
2019–2021	Gençlerbirliği	10	(0)
2019–2020	→ Hacettepe (loan)	27	(1)
2021–2023	Bucaspor 1928	31	(2)
2022–2023	→ Amed (loan)	16	(0)
2023	→ Ankara Demirspor (loan)	13	(4)
2023–2025	Batman Petrolspor	47	(3)
2025–	Güzide Gebzespor	22	(1)
- * Club domestic league appearances and goals as of 1 October 2026

Mustafa Hüseyin Seyhan (born 23 April 1996) is a Turkish professional footballer who plays as a midfielder for TFF 2. Lig club Güzide Gebzespor.

== Professional career ==
A youth product of Gençlerbirliği, Seyhan spent most of his early career in amateur leagues with Hacettepe and Çankaya before returning to Gençlerbirliği in 2019. Seyhan made his professional debut with Gençlerbirliği in a 3-1 Süper Lig loss to Sivasspor on 24 December 2020.
