= Dominik Furman =

Polish footballer (born 1992)

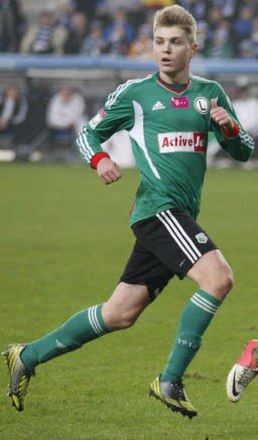
- Furman with Legia Warsaw in 2012

Personal information
- Full name: Dominik Grzegorz Furman
- Date of birth: 6 July 1992 (age 34)
- Place of birth: Szydłowiec, Poland
- Height: 1.81 m (5 ft 11 in)
- Position: Midfielder

Youth career
- 2001–2005: Szydłowianka Szydłowiec
- 2005–2009: Legia Warsaw

Senior career*
Years	Team	Apps	(Gls)
2009–2014	Legia Warsaw	46	(3)
2014–2017	Toulouse	5	(0)
2015	→ Legia Warsaw (loan)	24	(2)
2016	→ Hellas Verona (loan)	1	(0)
2016–2017	→ Wisła Płock (loan)	32	(3)
2017–2020	Wisła Płock	107	(15)
2020–2021	Gençlerbirliği	21	(0)
2021–2023	Wisła Płock	58	(0)
Total		294	(23)

International career
2009	Poland U18	4	(0)
2011–2012	Poland U20	5	(2)
2012–2014	Poland U21	10	(1)
2012–2019	Poland	3	(0)
- * Club domestic league appearances and goals

Dominik Grzegorz Furman (born 6 July 1992) is a Polish former professional footballer who played as a midfielder.

== Career ==
Furman started his career with Legia Warsaw.

== Career statistics ==
=== Club ===
Appearances and goals by club, season and competition
Club	Season	League			National cup (Note: Includes Polish Cup, Turkish Cup)		Other		Total	
Club	Season	Division	Apps	Goals	Apps	Goals	Apps	Goals	Apps	Goals
Legia Warsaw	2011–12	Ekstraklasa	0	0	1	0	—		1	0
Legia Warsaw	2012–13	Ekstraklasa	28	3	6	0	5 (Note: Four appearances in UEFA Europa League, one appearance in Polish Super Cup)	0	39	3
Legia Warsaw	2013–14	Ekstraklasa	18	0	1	0	11 (Note: Five appearances in UEFA Champions League, six appearances in UEFA Europa League)	0	31	0
Legia Warsaw	Total		46	3	8	0	17	0	71	3
Toulouse	2013–14	Ligue 1	5	0	0	0	—		5	0
Toulouse	2014–15	Ligue 1	0	0	0	0	—		0	0
Toulouse	2015–16	Ligue 1	0	0	0	0	—		0	0
Toulouse	2016–17	Ligue 1	0	0	0	0	—		0	0
Toulouse	Total		5	0	0	0	0	0	5	0
Legia Warsaw (loan)	2014–15	Ekstraklasa	10	0	3	0	—		13	0
Legia Warsaw (loan)	2015–16	Ekstraklasa	14	2	3	0	9 (Note: Eight appearances in UEFA Europa League, one appearance in Polish Super Cup)	0	26	2
Legia Warsaw (loan)	Total		24	2	6	0	9	0	39	2
Hellas Verona (loan)	2015–16	Serie A	1	0	0	0	—		1	0
Wisła Płock (loan)	2016–17	Ekstraklasa	32	3	0	0	—		32	3
Wisła Płock	2017–18	Ekstraklasa	35	2	1	0	—		36	2
Wisła Płock	2018–19	Ekstraklasa	36	6	1	1	—		37	7
Wisła Płock	2019–20	Ekstraklasa	36	7	1	0	—		37	7
Wisła Płock	Total		107	15	3	1	0	0	110	16
Gençlerbirliği	2020–21	Süper Lig	21	0	2	0	—		23	0
Wisła Płock	2021–22	Ekstraklasa	25	0	1	0	—		26	0
Wisła Płock	2022–23	Ekstraklasa	33	0	0	0	—		33	0
Wisła Płock	Total		58	0	1	0	0	0	59	0
Career total			294	23	17	1	26	0	337	24

=== International ===
Appearances and goals by national team and year
National team	Year	Apps	Goals
Poland
Poland	2012	1	0
Poland	2013	1	0
Poland	2019	1	0
Total		3	0

== Honours ==
Legia Warsaw

- Ekstraklasa: 2012–13, 2013–14, 2015–16
- Polish Cup: 2011–12, 2012–13, 2014–15, 2015–16

Individual

- Polish Newcomer of the Year: 2013
- Ekstraklasa Player of the Month: October 2019
