= Halil İbrahim Pehlivan =

Turkish footballer

Personal information
- Full name: Halil İbrahim Pehlivan
- Date of birth: 21 August 1993 (age 33)
- Place of birth: Ankara, Turkey
- Height: 1.83 m (6 ft 0 in)
- Position: Left back

Team information
- Current team: Ankaragücü
- Number: 3

Youth career
- 2004–2007: Gençlerbirliği
- 2007–2010: Hacettepe
- 2010–2012: Gençlerbirliği

Senior career*
Years	Team	Apps	(Gls)
2012–2014	Hacettepe	30	(1)
2014–2021	Gençlerbirliği	71	(0)
2017	→ Adanaspor (loan)	4	(0)
2021–2023	Gaziantep	34	(0)
2023–2025	Çaykur Rizespor	44	(0)
2025–	Ankaragücü	11	(0)
- * Club domestic league appearances and goals as of 15 June 2025

Halil İbrahim Pehlivan (born 21 August 1993) is a Turkish professional footballer who plays as a left back for TFF First League club Ankaragücü.

== Career ==
A youth product of Hacettepe and Gençlerbirliği, Pehlivan began his career with Haceteppe in 2012, before moving to Gençlerbirliği in 2014. He had a short loan with Adanaspor in 2017. On 6 July 2021, he transferred to Gaziantep, signing a 3-year contract.
