= Yusuf Emre Gültekin =

Turkish footballer (born 1993)

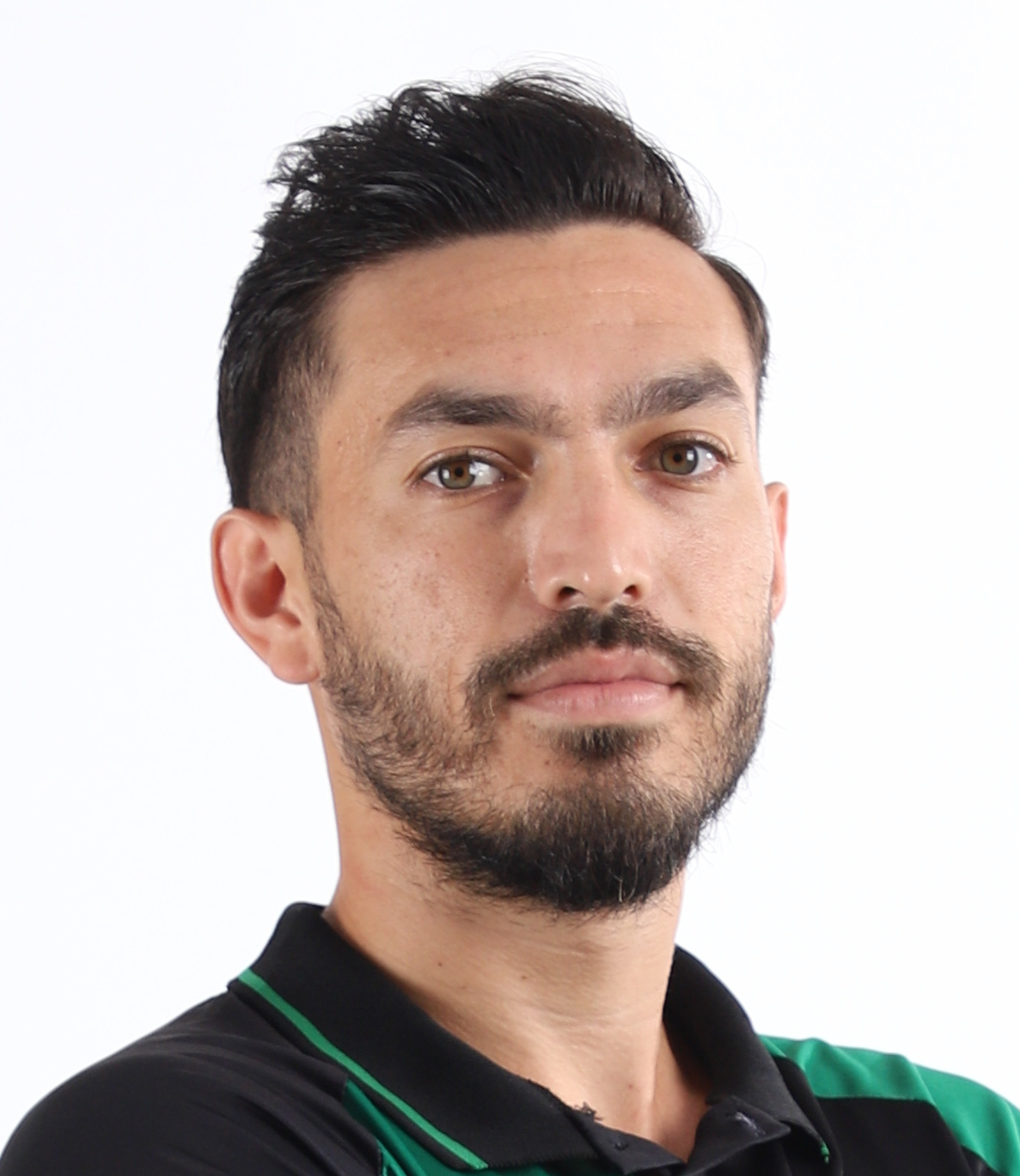
- Gültekin in 2023

Personal information
- Date of birth: 12 March 1993 (age 33)
- Place of birth: Altındağ, Ankara Province, Turkey
- Height: 1.78 m (5 ft 10 in)
- Position: Midfielder

Team information
- Current team: Ankaragücü
- Number: 10

Youth career
- 2003–2011: Gençlerbirliği

Senior career*
Years	Team	Apps	(Gls)
2011–2016	Gençlerbirliği	6	(0)
2013	→ Hacettepe (loan)	10	(1)
2014–2015	→ Hacettepe (loan)	21	(1)
2015–2016	→ Boluspor (loan)	26	(0)
2016–2019	Boluspor	98	(4)
2019–2020	BB Erzurumspor	8	(0)
2020–2022	Ümraniyespor	50	(6)
2022–2023	Samsunspor	22	(0)
2023–2024	Kocaelispor	15	(1)
2024	→ Şanlıurfaspor (loan)	6	(1)
2024–	Ankaragücü	38	(2)

International career^{‡}
2012	Turkey U20	2	(0)
- * Club domestic league appearances and goals as of 10:44, 19 September 2026 (UTC) ‡ National team caps and goals as of 21:27, 27 May 2022 (UTC)

Yusuf Emre Gültekin (born 12 March 1993) is a Turkish professional footballer who plays as a midfielder for Ankaragücü.
