= Übeyd Adıyaman =

Turkish footballer (born 1997)

Personal information
- Date of birth: 2 October 1997 (age 29)
- Place of birth: Malatya, Turkey
- Height: 1.94 m (6 ft 4 in)
- Position: Goalkeeper

Team information
- Current team: Güzide Gebzespor
- Number: 1

Youth career
- 2007–2010: Malatya Sanayispor
- 2010–2013: Gençlerbirliği

Senior career*
Years	Team	Apps	(Gls)
2013–2023	Gençlerbirliği	42	(0)
2015–2018	→ Hacettepe (loan)	16	(0)
2019	→ Fethiyespor (loan)	15	(0)
2020	→ BB Bodrumspor (loan)	8	(0)
2023	Fethiyespor	6	(0)
2023–2026	Ümraniyespor	15	(0)
2026–	Güzide Gebzespor	4	(0)

International career^{‡}
2012	Turkey U15	3	(0)
2012–2013	Turkey U16	17	(0)
2012–2014	Turkey U17	13	(0)
2014–2015	Turkey U18	3	(0)
2015	Turkey U19	3	(0)
- * Club domestic league appearances and goals as of 1 October 2026 ‡ National team caps and goals as of 25 January 2021

Übeyd Adıyaman (born 2 October 1997) is a Turkish football player who plays as a goalkeeper for Güzide Gebzespor in the TFF 2. Lig.

== Professional career ==
Adıyaman is a youth product of Gençlerbirliği, and spent most of this early career as their backup goalkeeper. He had several stints on loan with Hacettepe, as well as brief loans with Fethiyespor and BB Bodrumspor. Adıyaman made his professional debut with Gençlerbirliği in a 6-0 Süper Lig loss to Galatasaray on 9 January 2021.
