= Arda Kızıldağ =

Turkish footballer (born 1998)

Personal information
- Date of birth: 15 October 1998 (age 28)
- Place of birth: Yenimahalle, Turkey
- Height: 1.87 m (6 ft 2 in)
- Position: Defender

Team information
- Current team: Gaziantep
- Number: 4

Youth career
- 2008–2017: Gençlerbirliği

Senior career*
Years	Team	Apps	(Gls)
2017–2022	Gençlerbirliği	59	(2)
2017–2019	→ Hacettepe (loan)	34	(1)
2022–	Gaziantep	87	(8)
2023	→ Ankaragücü (loan)	7	(0)

International career^{‡}
2020	Turkey U21	1	(0)
2022	Turkey U23	4	(0)
Medal record
Men's football
Representing Turkey
Islamic Solidarity Games
Gold medal – first place	2021 Konya
- * Club domestic league appearances and goals as of 10 June 2026 ‡ National team caps and goals as of 14 August 2022

Arda Kızıldağ (born 15 October 1998) is a Turkish professional footballer who plays as a defender for Gaziantep in the Turkish Süper Lig.

== Professional career ==
Kızıldağ made his professional debut for Gençlerbirliği in a 4-0 Süper Lig loss to Gazişehir Gaziantep F.K. on 26 August 2019.

On 16 June 2022, Kızıldağ signed a three-year contract with Gaziantep.

== International career ==
Kızıldağ represented the Turkey U23s in their winning campaign at the 2021 Islamic Solidarity Games.

== Honours ==
Turkey U23

- Islamic Solidarity Games: 2021
