= Metehan Mert =

Turkish footballer

Personal information
- Date of birth: 1 May 1999 (age 27)
- Place of birth: Çubuk, Turkey
- Height: 1.80 m (5 ft 11 in)
- Position: Centre-back

Team information
- Current team: Batman Petrolspor
- Number: 4

Youth career
- 2011–2016: Ankarakartalspor
- 2016–2018: Gençlerbirliği

Senior career*
Years	Team	Apps	(Gls)
2018–2023	Gençlerbirliği	53	(4)
2019–2021	→ Hacettepe (loan)	33	(2)
2023–2026	Konyaspor	4	(0)
2024–2025	→ Esenler Erokspor (loan)	29	(0)
2025–2026	→ Sarıyer (loan)	36	(2)
2026–	Batman Petrolspor	10	(1)
- * Club domestic league appearances and goals as of 18 October 2026

Metehan Mert (born 1 May 1999) is a Turkish professional footballer who plays as a centre-back for TFF 1. Lig club Batman Petrolspor.

== Career ==
Mert is a youth product of the academies of Ankarakartalspor, and Gençlerbirliği. Mert signed his first professional contract with Gençlerbirliği in December 2018, and made his first senior appearance in a 2–1 Turkish Cup win over Hatayspor on 4 December 2018. He soon after went on a series of loans with their affiliate club, Hacettepe, in the TFF Second League. Mert returned to Gençlerbirliği, and made his professional debut with them in a 4–0 Süper Lig loss to Göztepe on 19 January 2021.
