= Efşan Geçgin =

Turkish footballer

Personal information
- Date of birth: 26 January 1992 (age 34)
- Place of birth: Ankara, Turkey
- Height: 1.80 m (5 ft 11 in)
- Position: Defender

Team information
- Current team: Ankara Demirspor
- Number: 4

Youth career
- 2002–2009: Gençlerbirliği

Senior career*
Years	Team	Apps	(Gls)
2009–2014	Gençlerbirliği	1	(0)
2010–2011	→ Hacettepe (loan)	25	(0)
2012	→ Aydınspor (loan)	16	(1)
2012–2013	→ Hacettepe (loan)	8	(0)
2013–2014	→ Bergama Belediyespor (loan)	28	(0)
2014–2015	Denizli Belediyespor	32	(2)
2015–2016	Sakaryaspor	8	(0)
2016–2017	Bergama Belediyespor	13	(0)
2017	Ankara Demirspor	16	(4)
2017–2018	Turgutluspor	17	(0)
2018–2019	Manavgat Belediyespor		
2019–2022	Isparta 32 Spor	55	(2)
2022–2023	Etimesgut Belediyespor	8	(0)
2023–	Ankara Demirspor	5	(0)

International career
2009	Turkey U16	1	(0)
2009	Turkey U18	3	(0)
- * Club domestic league appearances and goals as of 23 September 2023

Efşan Geçgin (born 26 January 1992) is a Turkish professional footballer who plays as a defender for Ankara Demirspor.

== Career ==
Tosun began his career at the Gençlerbirliği Youth Academy in 2002.

İleri is also a youth international.
