= Robert Piris Da Motta =

Paraguayan footballer (born 1994)

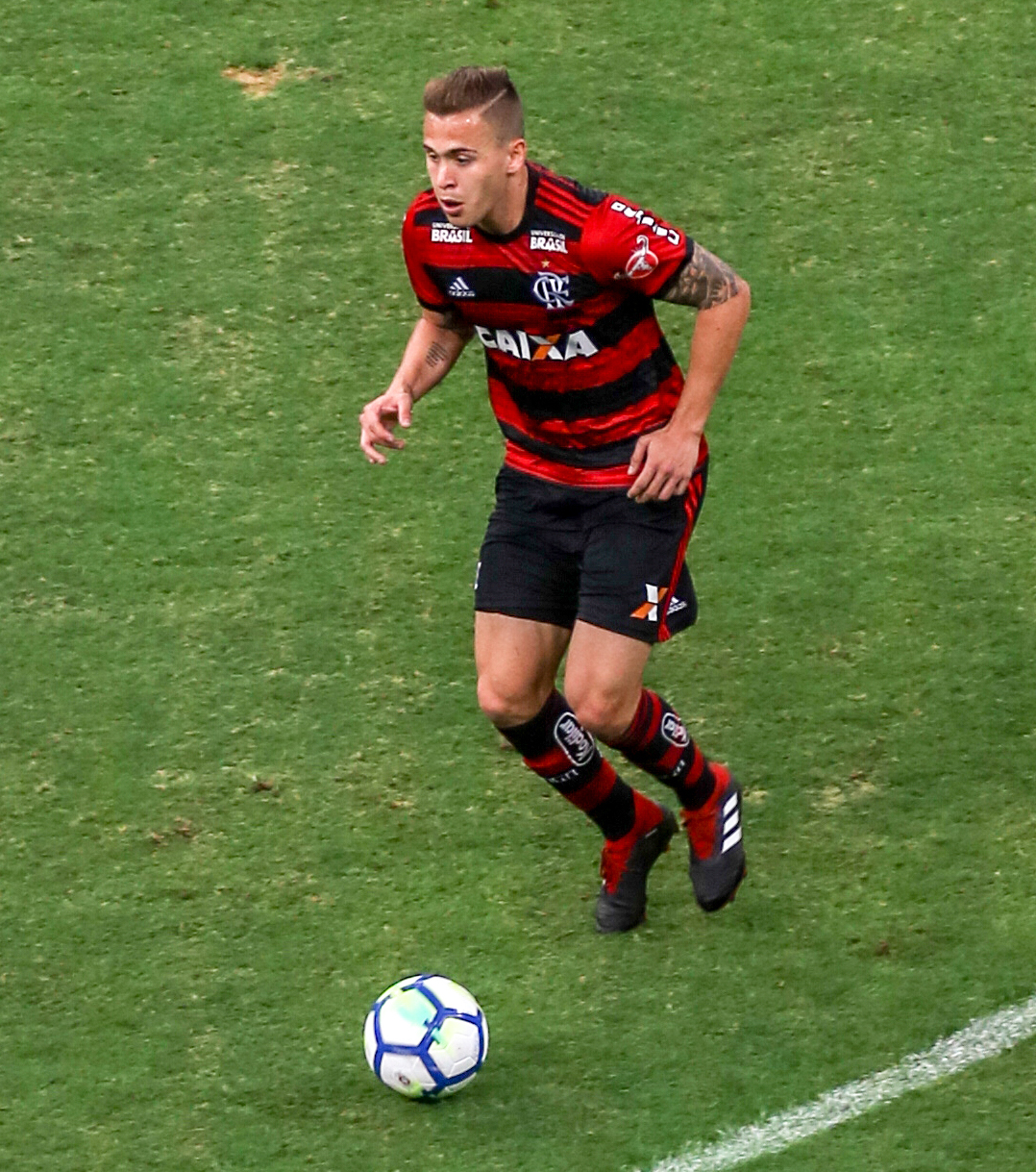
- Piris Da Motta with Flamengo in 2018

Personal information
- Full name: Robert Ayrton Piris Da Motta Mendoza
- Date of birth: 26 July 1994 (age 32)
- Place of birth: Ciudad del Este, Paraguay
- Height: 1.80 m (5 ft 11 in)
- Position: Defensive midfielder

Team information
- Current team: Cerro Porteño
- Number: 26

Youth career
- 2005–2010: Rubio Ñu

Senior career*
Years	Team	Apps	(Gls)
2010–2016	Rubio Ñu	123	(4)
2015–2016	→ Olimpia (loan)	30	(2)
2017–2018	San Lorenzo	21	(0)
2018–2021	Flamengo	42	(0)
2020–2021	→ Gençlerbirliği (loan)	36	(6)
2022–	Cerro Porteño	108	(6)

International career^{‡}
2011	Paraguay U17	4	(0)
2012–2015	Paraguay U20	15	(1)
2016–	Paraguay	9	(0)
- * Club domestic league appearances and goals as of 12 August 2025 ‡ National team caps and goals as of 2 July 2021

Robert Ayrton Piris Da Motta Mendoza (born 26 July 1994) is a Paraguayan professional footballer who plays as a defensive midfielder for Cerro Porteño and the Paraguay national team.

== Club career ==
Piris Da Motta has played football for Club Rubio Ñu, and since July 2015 for Club Olimpia.

=== San Lorenzo ===
On 10 January 2017 Piris Da Motta left Paraguayan side Club Rubio Ñu to join Argentine club San Lorenzo in a US$750,000 transfer.

=== Flamengo ===
On 1 August 2018 Piris Da Motta arrived in Rio de Janeiro to sign a four-year contract with Flamengo in a €2.5m transfer from San Lorenzo. On the next day he passed his medical exams and signed a contract that keeps him at the club through December 2020.

The truth is that I am very happy with this step in my career, even more to play for the biggest club in Brazil; just knowing that they were interested in me was a great honor. I hope to enjoy my stay here at Flamengo and enjoy it to the fullest.

He made his debut for Flamengo on 13 August 2018 playing as a starter against Cruzeiro in a Campeonato Brasileiro Série A match at Maracanã Stadium, which Flamengo won 1–0. Piris Da Motta earned the first team spot when Gustavo Cuéllar was suspended for the match.

==== Gençlerbirliği (loan) ====
On 7 September 2020 Flamengo announced the transfer of Piris Da Motta on a one year loan deal to Süper Lig club Gençlerbirliği S.K. Despite the club's poor performance being relegated at the end of the season Piris Da Motta had a strong year with 36 appearances and 6 goals scored.

== International career ==
Piris da Motta was called up to the Paraguay national team for the first time in September 2015.

== Career statistics ==
=== Club ===
As of 9 December 2021.

Club	Season	League			Cup		Continental		Other		Total	
Club	Season	Division	Apps	Goals	Apps	Goals	Apps	Goals	Apps	Goals	Apps	Goals
Rubio Ñu	2010	Primera División	4	0	—		—		—		4	0
Rubio Ñu	2011	Primera División	8	0	—		—		—		8	0
Rubio Ñu	2012	Primera División	22	0	–		—		—		22	0
Rubio Ñu	2013	Primera División	26	0	—		—		—		26	0
Rubio Ñu	2014	Primera División	35	2	—		—		—		35	2
Rubio Ñu	2015	Primera División	21	2	—		—		—		21	2
Rubio Ñu	2016	Primera División	7	0	—		—		—		7	0
Rubio Ñu	Total		123	4	—		—		—		123	4
Olimpia (loan)	2015	Primera División	13	1	—		5 (Note: Appearance(s) in Copa Sudamericana.)	0	—		18	1
Olimpia (loan)	2016	Primera División	17	1	—		4 (Note: Appearance(s) in Copa Libertadores.)	0	—		21	1
Olimpia (loan)	Total		30	2	—		9	0	—		39	2
San Lorenzo	2016–17	Primera División	1	0	0	0	0	0	—		1	0
San Lorenzo	2017–18	Primera División	20	0	1	0	2	0	—		23	0
San Lorenzo	2018–19	Primera División	0	0	0	0	1	0	—		1	0
San Lorenzo	Total		21	0	1	0	3	0	—		25	0
Flamengo	2018	Série A	11	0	—		0	0	—		11	0
Flamengo	2019	Série A	26	0	2	0	5	0	7 (Note: Six appearances in Campeonato Carioca, one appearance in FIFA Club World Cup.)	0	40	0
Flamengo	2020	Série A	0	0	0	0	0	0	0	0	0	0
Flamengo	2021	Série A	5	0	0	0	1	0	—		6	0
Flamengo	Total		42	0	2	0	6	0	7	0	53	0
Gençlerbirliği (loan)	2020–21	Süper Lig	36	6	0	0	—		—		36	6
Cerro Porteño	2022	Primera División	0	0	—		0	0	—		0	0
Career total			252	12	3	0	18	0	7	0	280	12

=== International ===
As of match played 2 July 2021.

Paraguay
Year	Apps	Goals
2016	3	0
2017	2	0
2019	1	0
2021	3	0
Total	9	0

== Honours ==
=== Club ===
Olimpia

- Paraguayan Primera División: 2015 Clausura

Flamengo

- Copa Libertadores: 2019
- Recopa Sudamericana: 2020
- Campeonato Brasileiro Série A: 2019
- Supercopa do Brasil: 2020
- Campeonato Carioca: 2019, 2020
