= Diego Ângelo =

Brazilian footballer (born 1986)

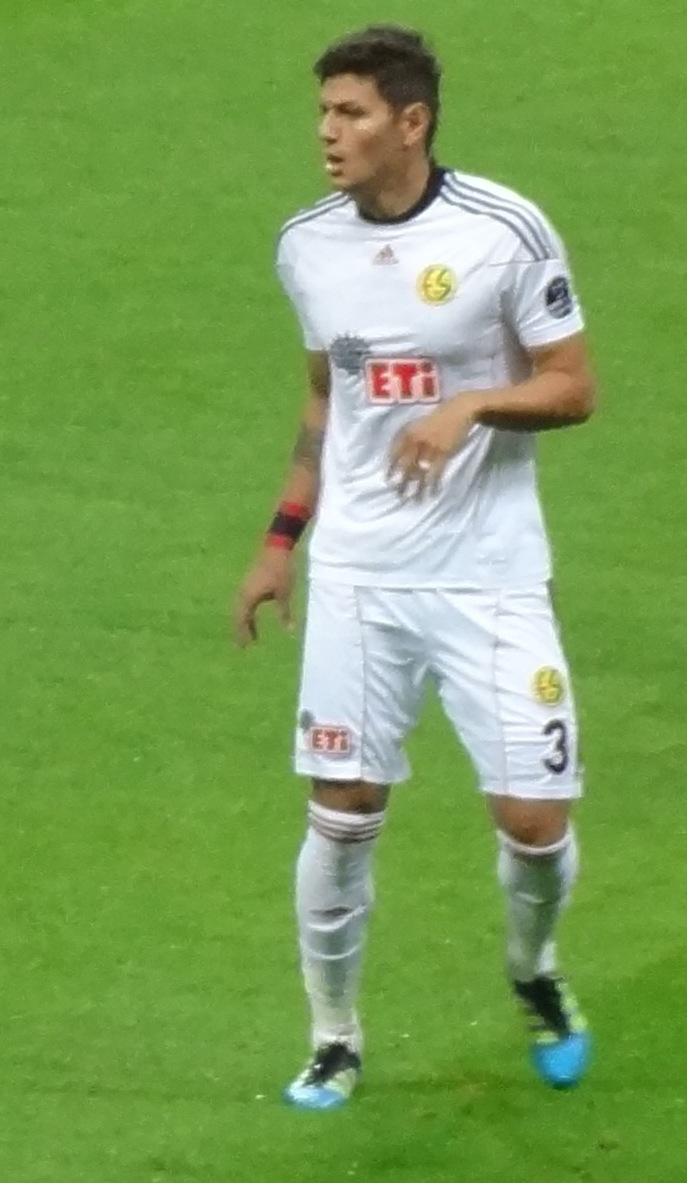
- Diego Ângelo with Eskişehirspor in 2011

Personal information
- Full name: Diego Ângelo de Oliveira
- Date of birth: 17 February 1986 (age 40)
- Place of birth: Anápolis, Brazil
- Height: 1.92 m (6 ft 4 in)
- Position: Centre-back

Senior career*
Years	Team	Apps	(Gls)
2005–2006	Santos	0	(0)
2007	Ituano	14	(1)
2007–2010	Naval	81	(8)
2010–2011	Genoa	0	(0)
2010–2011	→ Eskişehirspor (loan)	20	(2)
2011–2015	Eskişehirspor	103	(12)
2015–2020	Antalyaspor	132	(7)
2020	→ Kayserispor (loan)	14	(1)
2020–2021	Gençlerbirliği	25	(3)
Total		389	(34)
- * Club domestic league appearances and goals

Diego Ângelo de Oliveira (born 17 February 1986), known as Diego Ângelo, is a Brazilian former professional footballer who played as a central defender.

Having started at Santos, he all but spent his 16-year career in the Turkish Süper Lig, totalling 294 appearances and 25 goals representing four clubs.

== Career ==
=== Brazil ===
Born in Anápolis, Goiás, Diego Ângelo started his professional career in São Paulo with Santos FC. After signing a six-month contract in July 2005, he agreed to a new one-year deal in January of the following year.

Diego Ângelo left for Ituano Futebol Clube on 1 March 2007, joining until 31 December. He played in that season's Campeonato Paulista as well as in the Série B; he started the opening match against Ceará Sporting Club on 12 May, and scored a goal on 10 July in a 3–1 home win over Paulista Futebol Clube.

Diego Ângelo made his last appearance for Ituano on 28 August 2007, a 1–1 home draw against Marília Atlético Clube, with his team ranking 20th and last.

=== Naval ===
On 30 August 2007, Diego Ângelo signed with Associação Naval 1º de Maio of Portugal. He made his competitive debut on 30 September in a 2–0 away loss to C.D. Nacional, and finished his first season with 22 games and four goals as the Figueira da Foz team managed to retain their Primeira Liga status.

In 2009–10, Diego Ângelo appeared in all 30 league fixtures for Naval, who finished in a best-ever eighth place. During that time period, he also signed a pre-contract with Genoa CFC, after the Italian Serie A club agreed a fee with the Portuguese.

=== Genoa and Eskişehirspor ===
On 19 May 2010, Diego Ângelo was called up to Genoa's upcoming training camp in Tuscany. He made his debut on the same day, a 2–1 friendly against Prima Divisione side AS Lucchese Libertas 1905. On 12 August he was loaned to Eskişehirspor, with the Süper Lig club having an option to purchase him at the end of the campaign.

In late May 2011, Diego Ângelo moved to the New Eskişehir Stadium on a permanent two-year contract. He remained in the Turkish top flight until the end of his career aged 35, with Antalyaspor, Kayserispor and Gençlerbirliği SK.
