= Cihat Çelik =

Dutch footballer (born 1996)

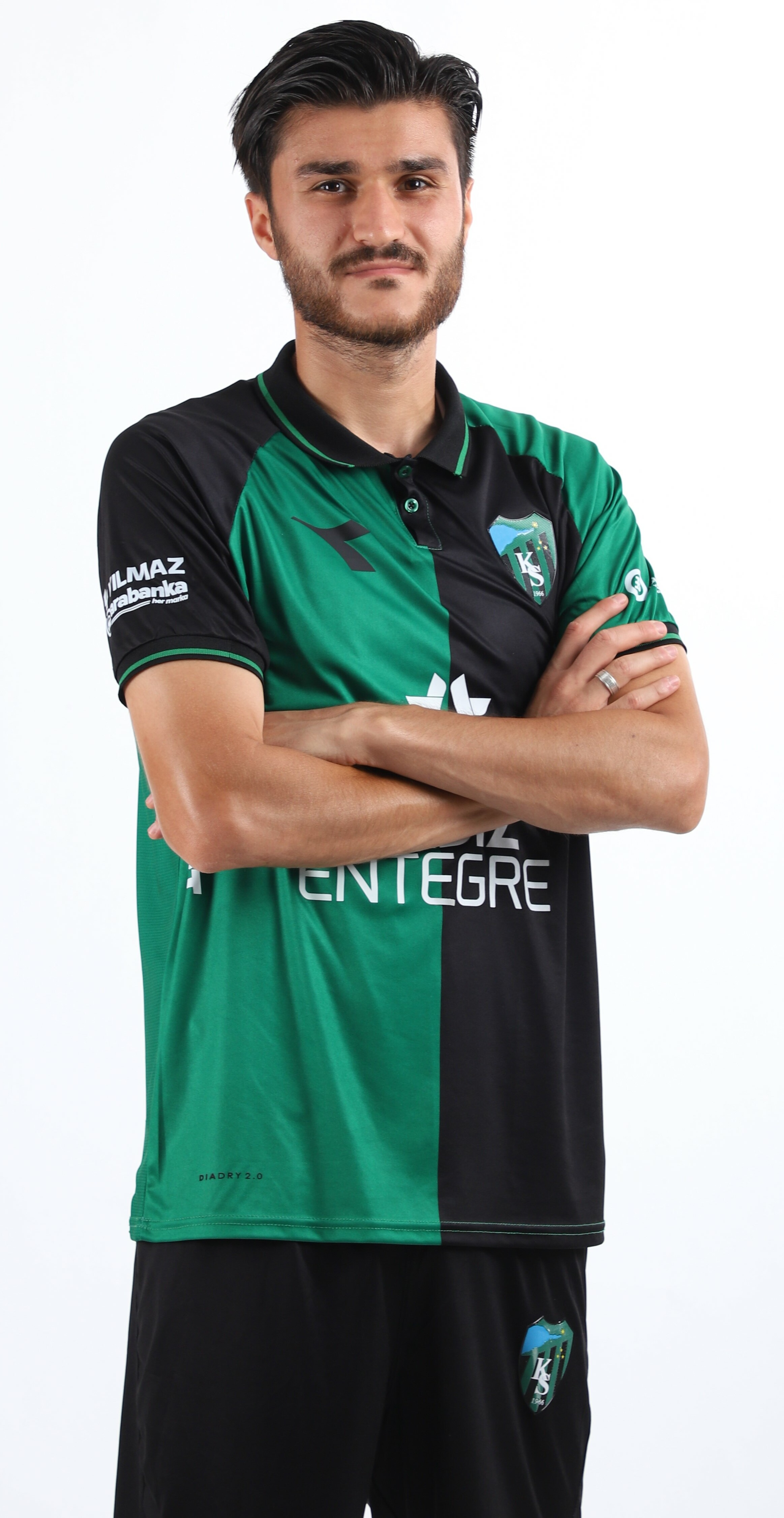
- Çelik in 2022

Personal information
- Full name: Yusuf Cihat Çelik
- Date of birth: 2 January 1996 (age 30)
- Place of birth: Oss, Netherlands
- Height: 1.84 m (6 ft 0 in)
- Position: Midfielder

Team information
- Current team: Sivasspor
- Number: 80

Youth career
- FC Schadewijk
- TOP Oss
- NEC

Senior career*
| Years | Team | Apps | (Gls) |
| 2013–2016 | NEC | 20 | (0) |
| 2016–2017 | FC Oss | 31 | (3) |
| 2017–2019 | Gazişehir Gaziantep | 5 | (0) |
| 2018 | → Čelik Zenica | 11 | (0) |
| 2019–2020 | TOP Oss | 23 | (1) |
| 2020 | İstanbulspor | 2 | (0) |
| 2021–2022 | Akhisarspor | 50 | (9) |
| 2022–2025 | Kocaelispor | 104 | (11) |
| 2025– | Sivasspor | 33 | (3) |

International career^{‡}
| 2012 | Netherlands U16 | 2 | (0) |
| 2013 | Netherlands U18 | 2 | (0) |
| 2014 | Netherlands U19 | 1 | (0) |
| 2015–2016 | Netherlands U20 | 8 | (0) |
- * Club domestic league appearances and goals as of 6 May 2026 ‡ National team caps and goals as of 17 June 2018

Cihat Çelik (born 2 January 1996) is a Dutch professional footballer who plays as a winger for Turkish TFF 1. Lig club Sivasspor.

== Club career ==
Çelik progressed through the youth academy of NEC and made his professional debut for the club on 3 August 2013 as a starter in a 4–1 loss to FC Groningen. He was replaced at half-time by Alireza Jahanbakhsh. On 3 April 2015, he won the second-tier Eerste Divisie with NEC after a 1–0 win over Sparta Rotterdam. Çelik, however, failed to make a definitive breakthrough for the team

Çelik joined Eerste Divisie side FC Oss in summer 2016. In the 2016–17 season, he made 31 appearances for FC Oss in which he scored three goals. In May 2017, Oss announced the option to extend his contract for another year. In July of the same year, Çelik moved to Turkish club Gazişehir Gaziantep, who competed in the second tier TFF First League. In January 2018, he joined Bosnian Premijer Liga side Čelik Zenica on a six-month loan deal. He also failed to establish himself in the Gazişehir Gaziantep starting eleven in the 2018–19 season, and he returned to TOP Oss in July 2019.

== Honours ==
NEC

- Eerste Divisie: 2014–15
