= Enes Keskin =

Turkish footballer

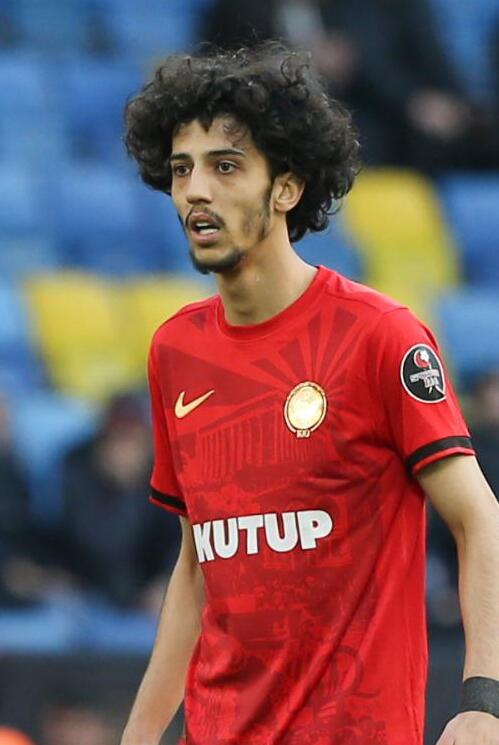
- Keskin in 2023

Personal information
- Date of birth: June 4, 2001 (age 25)
- Place of birth: Kadıköy, Turkey
- Height: 1.85 m (6 ft 1 in)
- Position: Midfielder

Team information
- Current team: Alanyaspor
- Number: 8

Youth career
- 2013–2015: Sancaktepe FK
- 2015: Sarıgazispor
- 2015–2020: Pendikspor

Senior career*
Years	Team	Apps	(Gls)
2020–2021	Pendikspor	4	(0)
2020–2021	→Diyarbekirspor (loan)	23	(0)
2021–2022	Eyüpspor	22	(1)
2022–2025	Pendikspor	27	(0)
2023–2024	→Gençlerbirliği (loan)	31	(0)
2024	→Iğdır (loan)	17	(0)
2025–	Alanyaspor	34	(0)
- * Club domestic league appearances and goals as of 02:02, 16 August 2026 (UTC)

Enes Keskin (born 4 June 2001) is a Turkish footballer who plays as a midfielder for Süper Lig club Alanyaspor.

== Club career ==
Keskin is a product of the youth academies of the Turkish clubs Sancaktepe FK, Sarıgazispor and Pendikspor. He began his senior career with Pendikspor in 2020 in the TFF First League, before going out on a season-long loan with Diyarbekirspor. He followed that up with a transfer to Eyüpspor. On 23 June 2022, he returned to Pendikspor. On 16 August 2023, he joined Gençlerbirliği on a season-long loan. He moved to Iğdır on loan for the second half of the 2023–24 season, but was suspended due to a betting scandal.

On 1 February 2025, he transferred to Süper Lig club Alanyaspor on a 4.5-year contract.

== Controversy ==
On 13 November 2025, Keskin was among more than 100 players in Turkey sanctioned by the Turkish Football Federation during the 2025 Turkish football betting scandal.

== Honours ==
Diyarbekirspor

- TFF 3. Lig: 2020–21
