= Hakan Demir (footballer) =

Turkish footballer

Personal information
- Date of birth: 8 May 1998 (age 28)
- Place of birth: Hafik, Turkey
- Height: 1.72 m (5 ft 8 in)
- Position: Midfielder

Team information
- Current team: Aliağa FK
- Number: 58

Youth career
- 2008: Okmeydanıspor
- 2008–2018: Kasımpaşa

Senior career*
| Years | Team | Apps | (Gls) |
| 2018–2020 | Kasımpaşa | 7 | (0) |
| 2019 | → Sultanbeyli Belediyespor (loan) | 10 | (0) |
| 2020–2021 | 24 Erzincanspor | 33 | (2) |
| 2021–2022 | 1461 Trabzon | 18 | (1) |
| 2022 | Tarsus İdman Yurdu | 16 | (0) |
| 2022–2023 | Iğdır | 12 | (1) |
| 2023 | Karacabey Belediyespor | 15 | (1) |
| 2023– | Aliağa FK | 3 | (0) |
- * Club domestic league appearances and goals as of 23 September 2023

Hakan Demir (born 8 May 1998) is a Turkish professional footballer who plays as a midfielder for TFF 2. Lig club Aliağa FK.

== Professional career ==
Demir is a product of the Kasımpaşa academy, joining them in 2008. He made his professional debut in a 3–2 Süper Lig win over Çaykur Rizespor on 11 August 2018. On 16 January 2019, Demir was loaned out to Sultanbeyi Belediyespor for the rest of the season.
