= İlker Karakaş =

Turkish footballer

Personal information
- Date of birth: 11 January 1999 (age 27)
- Place of birth: İzmit, Turkey
- Height: 1.87 m (6 ft 2 in)
- Position: Striker

Team information
- Current team: 68 Aksaray Belediyespor
- Number: 9

Youth career
- 2011–2018: Gençlerbirliği

Senior career*
| Years | Team | Apps | (Gls) |
| 2018–2023 | Gençlerbirliği | 75 | (4) |
| 2018–2019 | → Hacettepe (loan) | 22 | (4) |
| 2023–2025 | Gaziantep | 13 | (0) |
| 2025 | → Batman Petrolspor (loan) | 15 | (0) |
| 2025– | 68 Aksaray Belediyespor | 13 | (5) |

International career^{‡}
| 2014 | Turkey U15 | 2 | (0) |
| 2014 | Turkey U16 | 2 | (0) |
| 2017–2018 | Turkey U19 | 11 | (1) |
| 2020 | Turkey U21 | 4 | (0) |
- * Club domestic league appearances and goals as of 30 November 2025 ‡ National team caps and goals as of 17 November 2020

İlker Karakaş (born 11 January 1999) is a Turkish professional footballer who plays as a striker for TFF 2. Lig club 68 Aksaray Belediyespor.

== Professional career ==
İlker joined the Gençlerbirliği youth academy in 2011. He made his professional debut for Gençlerbirliği in a 3-2 Süper Lig loss to Kayserispor on 15 April 2018.

On 11 July 2023, he signed a 2-year contract with Turkish Süper Lig club Gaziantep.

== International career ==
İlker is a youth international for Turkey.
