= Gökhan Altıparmak =

Turkish footballer (born 2001)

Personal information
- Full name: Sami Gökhan Altıparmak
- Date of birth: 20 April 2001 (age 25)
- Place of birth: Yenimahalle, Turkey
- Height: 1.85 m (6 ft 1 in)
- Position: Midfielder

Team information
- Current team: Batman Petrolspor
- Number: 79

Youth career
- 2013–2020: Gençlerbirliği

Senior career*
Years	Team	Apps	(Gls)
2020–2026	Gençlerbirliği	76	(4)
2023–2024	→ Hacettepe 1945 SK (loan)	25	(3)
2025–2026	→ Serikspor (loan)	32	(6)
2026–	Batman Petrolspor	10	(3)
- * Club domestic league appearances and goals as of 18 October 2026

Sami Gökhan Altıparmak (born 20 April 2001) is a Turkish professional footballer who plays as a midfielder for TFF 1. Lig club Batman Petrolspor.

== Club career ==
On 5 February 2020, Altıparmak signed his first professional contract with Gençlerbirliği. He made his debut with Gençlerbirliği in a 1-0 Süper Lig loss to Denizlispor on 14 March 2020.
