= Abdullah Şahindere =

Turkish footballer

Personal information
- Date of birth: 9 June 2003 (age 23)
- Place of birth: Ağrı, Turkey
- Height: 1.84 m (6 ft 0 in)
- Position: Defender

Team information
- Current team: Hacettepe 1945 SK

Youth career
- 2013–2014: Ulubeyspor
- 2014–2020: Gençlerbirliği

Senior career*
Years	Team	Apps	(Gls)
2020–	Gençlerbirliği	11	(1)
2023–	→ Hacettepe 1945 SK (loan)	1	(0)

International career^{‡}
2017–2018	Turkey U15	11	(2)
2018–2019	Turkey U16	9	(0)
2019–2020	Turkey U17	10	(0)
2021–2022	Turkey U19	10	(3)
- * Club domestic league appearances and goals as of 23 September 2023 ‡ National team caps and goals as of 26 March 2022

Abdullah Şahindere (born 9 June 2003) is a Turkish footballer who plays as a defender for TFF Third League club Hacettepe 1945 SK on loan from Gençlerbirliği.

== Career statistics ==
=== Club ===
As of 8 November 2020.

Club	Season	League			Cup		Continental		Other		Total	
Club	Season	Division	Apps	Goals	Apps	Goals	Apps	Goals	Apps	Goals	Apps	Goals
Gençlerbirliği	2020–21	Süper Lig	1	0	0	0	0	0	0	0	1	0
Career total			1	0	0	0	0	0	0	0	1	0
