= Hacettepe S.K. =

Hacettepe
- Full name: Hacettepe Spor Kulübü
- Nickname(s): Mor Menekşeler (The Purple Violets)
- Founded: 1949 (as Sanayi Barbarosspor); 2001 (as Asaşspor)
- Dissolved: 2023
- Ground: Etimesgut Belediyesi Atatürk Stadyumu, Etimesgut / Ankara
- Capacity: 2,640
- President: Bülent Üstündağ
- Manager: Avni Okumuş
- League: Ankara Amateur First Division
- 2023–24: Ankara Super Amateur League, withdrew
- Website: www.hacettepespor.org.tr
Home colours	Away colours

Hacettepe Spor Kulübü (English: Hacettepe Sports Club), commonly known as Hacettepe, is a Turkish professional football club located in Ankara.

== History ==
Hacettepe Spor Kulübü was founded as Sanayi Barbarosspor in 1949. The club played in third division in the Turkish League System between the years 1968 and 1972. It was renamed as Asaşspor in 1998 and played in the Turkish Second League between 1999–2001. Asasspor withdrew from that league after moving from the 4th to 5th group in the Turkish League System. After a financial crisis in 2003, Gençlerbirliği S.K. purchased the club and changed its name to Gençlerbirliği Asasspor. The logo of the club was replaced with that of the parent club (Gençlerbirliği). After OFTAŞ signed a sponsorship deal with Gençlerbirliği in 2006, the club's name was changed again to Gençlerbirliği OFTAŞ.

The 2006/2007 season was successful and the club was promoted from TFF First League to Turkish Süper Lig. It was managed by Gençlerbirliği's board under the name Gençlerbirliği Oftaş but when they were promoted to the Süper Lig other clubs of TFF First League forced to cancel the championship. They played 2007–2008 season under the same name, however, after growing speculations, on 18 July 2008 the club's name changed yet again to that of Hacettepe SK. The new club aims to maintain the old traditions of Hacettepe, as an old traditional club of the same district of Ankara. But in 1988 the club moved to Keçiören, one of the suburban areas of Ankara and became Keçiörengücü. Hacettepe S.K. still uses GB Oftaş's red and black colours, but old Hacettepe's legendary purple added to them. However, former Hacettepe's colours were purple and white. Club's new logo is composed of Ankara castle which can be seen from Hacettepe district

Prior to Gençlerbirliği OFTAŞ' name change, all OFTAŞ players were under special contract with the parent club Gençlerbirliği which uses OFTAŞ as a reserve team.

In 2007, before OFTAŞ was promoted, the Turkish Football Federation ruled that they would be permitted to compete in the Turkish Super Lig, alongside Gençlerbirliği, as long as the two clubs have different chairmen. This is in contrast to the rules of leagues in countries like Spain, where reserve teams can play in professional leagues but they cannot be in the same division with or in a higher division than their senior squad. 2008–2009 season was disastrous for Hacettepespor and they were relegated to Bank Asya First League despite defeating Galatasaray 2–0 on May 1 at Round 30 because Gençlerbirliği was beaten by İstanbul Büyükşehir Belediyespor 3–1. Hacettepespor tried to escaping from relegation in Bank Asya First League in 2009–10 season but they failed. Hacettepespor relegated to Third League after successive three relegation from Süper Lig in 2010–11 season. Hacettepe played 3 seasons in fourth level and returned to third level in 2013–14 season.

== Honours ==
- TFF First League:

Winners (1): 2006-2007

- TFF Third League

Winners (3): 1988-1989, 2003-2004, 2005-2006

Play-Off Winners (1): 2013-2014

Runners-up (1): 1996-1997

== League participations ==
- Süper Lig: 2 Seasons

2007-2009

- TFF First League: 4 Seasons

1999-2001, 2006-2007, 2009-2010

- TFF Second League: 16 Seasons

1968-1972, 1997-1999, 2004-2006, 2010-2011, 2014-2021

- TFF Third League: 7 Seasons

2001-2004, 2011-2014, 2021-2022

- Amateur Leagues: 44 Seasons

1949-1968, 1972-1997
