= 2022–23 Ümraniyespor season =

Ümraniyespor
2022–23 season
- Chairman: Tarık Aksar
- Manager: Recep Uçar (until 19 April 2023); Mustafa Er (from 20 April 2023)
- Stadium: Ümraniye Municipality City Stadium
- Süper Lig: 17th (relegated)
- Turkish Cup: Round of 16
- Top goalscorer: League: Umut Nayir (17 goals); All: Umut Nayir (18 goals)
| Home colours | Away colours | Third colours |

The 2022–23 season was the 85th season in the existence of Ümraniyespor and the club's first season in the top flight of Turkish football. In addition to the domestic league, Ümraniyespor participated in this season's edition of the Turkish Cup. The season covers the period from 1 July 2022 to 30 June 2023.

== Players ==
=== First-team squad ===
As of 26 August 2022

Note: Flags indicate national team as defined under FIFA eligibility rules; some limited exceptions apply. Players may hold more than one non-FIFA nationality.

| No. | Pos. | Nation | Player |
|---|---|---|---|
| 1 | GK | TUR | Serkan Kırıntılı |
| 2 | DF | TUR | Mert Yılmaz (on loan from Antalyaspor) |
| 3 | DF | ALB | Ermir Lenjani |
| 4 | DF | TUR | Mustafa Eser |
| 5 | MF | GHA | Isaac Sackey |
| 6 | MF | TUR | Yunus Mertoğlu |
| 7 | FW | ROU | Valentin Gheorghe (on loan from FCSB) |
| 8 | MF | TUR | Serkan Göksu |
| 10 | FW | TUR | Metehan Mimaroğlu (on loan from Eyüpspor) |
| 11 | MF | TUR | Onur Ayik |
| 13 | GK | TUR | Orkun Özdemir |
| 14 | MF | CGO | Durel Avounou |
| 15 | MF | TUR | Mustafa Karagöz |
| 16 | DF | TUR | Onur Atasayar |
| 17 | DF | TUR | Emre Nefiz |

| No. | Pos. | Nation | Player |
|---|---|---|---|
| 18 | FW | TUR | Umut Nayir (on loan from Eyüpspor) |
| 20 | MF | TUR | Oğuz Gürbulak |
| 23 | MF | TUR | Fatih Yiğit Şanlıtürk |
| 27 | FW | TUN | Adel Bettaieb |
| 28 | FW | VEN | Yonathan Del Valle |
| 29 | MF | ANG | Geraldo |
| 30 | MF | GEO | Nika Gagnidze (on loan from Dila Gori) |
| 33 | DF | BRA | Allyson |
| 34 | GK | TUR | Anıl Demir |
| 39 | MF | CRO | Antonio Mršić |
| 41 | MF | TUR | Kartal Yılmaz (on loan from Beşiktaş) |
| 44 | DF | CRO | Tomislav Glumac |
| 88 | MF | TUR | Tahsin Hacımustafaoğlu |
| 90 | DF | BUL | Strahil Popov |

=== Out on loan ===
Note: Flags indicate national team as defined under FIFA eligibility rules; some limited exceptions apply. Players may hold more than one non-FIFA nationality.

| No. | Pos. | Nation | Player |
|---|---|---|---|
| — | FW | TUR | Fuat Bavuk (at Adıyaman 1954) |

== Pre-season and friendlies ==
Win Draw Loss Fixtures

== Competitions ==
=== Overall record ===
| Competition | First match | Last match | Starting round | Final position | Record | | | | | | | |
| Competition | First match | Last match | Starting round | Final position | Pld | W | D | L | GF | GA | GD | Win % |
|---|---|---|---|---|---|---|---|---|---|---|---|---|
| Süper Lig | 8 August 2022 | 7 June 2023 | Matchday 1 | 17th | 36 | 7 | 9 | 20 | 47 | 64 | −17 | 19.44 |
| Turkish Cup | 9 November 2022 | 18 January 2023 | Fourth round | Round of 16 | 3 | 2 | 0 | 1 | 7 | 5 | +2 | 66.67 |
| Total | | | | | 39 | 9 | 9 | 21 | 54 | 69 | −15 | 23.08 |

Source: Soccerway

=== Süper Lig ===
==== League table ====
| Pos | Team | Pld | W | D | L | GF | GA | GD | Pts | Qualification or relegation |
|---|---|---|---|---|---|---|---|---|---|---|
| 15 | Alanyaspor | 36 | 11 | 8 | 17 | 54 | 70 | −16 | 41 (Note: Head-to-head points: İstanbulspor 11, Antalyaspor 10, Sivasspor 8, Alanyaspor 4.) | |
| 16 | Giresunspor (R) | 36 | 10 | 10 | 16 | 42 | 60 | −18 | 40 | Relegation to TFF First League |
| 17 | Ümraniyespor (R) | 36 | 7 | 9 | 20 | 47 | 64 | −17 | 30 | Relegation to TFF First League |
| 18 | Gaziantep (Note: On 12 February 2023, Gaziantep and Hatayspor withdrew from the league following the 2023 Turkey–Syria earthquake and were not relegated at the end of the season.) | 36 | 6 | 7 | 23 | 31 | 72 | −41 | 25 | Withdrawn |
| 19 | Hatayspor | 36 | 6 | 5 | 25 | 19 | 83 | −64 | 23 | Withdrawn |

Source: Süper Lig
Rules for classification: 1) Points; 2) Head-to-head points; 3) Head-to-head goal difference; 4) Head-to-head goals scored; 5) Goal difference; 6) Goals scored; 7) Play-off.
(R) Relegated

==== Results summary ====
| Overall | | | | | | | | Home | | | | | | Away | | | | | |
| Pld | W | D | L | GF | GA | GD | Pts | W | D | L | GF | GA | GD | W | D | L | GF | GA | GD |
|---|---|---|---|---|---|---|---|---|---|---|---|---|---|---|---|---|---|---|---|
| 36 | 7 | 9 | 20 | 47 | 66 | −19 | 30 | 3 | 4 | 11 | 22 | 29 | −7 | 4 | 5 | 9 | 25 | 37 | −12 |

Source: Spor Toto Süper Lig

==== Results by round ====
| Round | 1 | 2 | 3 | 4 | 5 | 6 | 7 | 8 | 9 | 10 | 11 | 12 | 13 | 14 | 15 | 16 | 17 | 18 | 19 | 20 | 21 | 22 | 23 | 24 | 25 | 26 | 27 | 28 | 29 | 30 | 31 | 32 | 33 | 34 | 35 | 36 | 37 | 38 |
|---|---|---|---|---|---|---|---|---|---|---|---|---|---|---|---|---|---|---|---|---|---|---|---|---|---|---|---|---|---|---|---|---|---|---|---|---|---|---|
| Ground | A | H | H | A | H | A | H | A | H | | H | A | H | A | H | A | H | A | H | H | A | A | H | A | H | A | H | A | | A | H | A | H | A | H | A | H | A |
| Result | D | L | L | L | L | D | L | L | D | B | L | L | W | D | L | W | D | W | L | L | L | L | D | W | W | D | D | L | B | L | L | L | W | D | L | W | L | L |
| Position | 8 | 13 | 15 | 17 | 18 | 17 | 18 | 19 | 19 | 19 | 19 | 19 | 19 | 19 | 19 | 19 | 18 | 18 | 19 | 19 | 19 | 19 | 19 | 19 | 19 | 19 | 18 | 18 | 18 | 18 | 18 | 18 | 17 | 17 | 17 | 17 | 17 | 17 |

Source: Spor Toto Süper Lig
A = Away; H = Home; B = Bye; W = Win; D = Draw; L = Loss

==== Matches ====
The league schedule was released on 4 July.

| 8 August 2022 1 | Fenerbahçe | 3–3 | Ümraniyespor | Istanbul |
| 21:45 TRT (UTC+3) | Arão (yellow card) 12'; Valencia 19' (pen.), 45+2', (yellow card) 22'; Peres (yellow card) 70'; Lincoln (yellow card) 76'; Gustavo Henrique (yellow card) 77'; Berisha (yellow card) 83', (goal) 90+2'; Kadıoğlu (yellow card) 90+5' | Report | Glumac 29'; Bettaieb (yellow card) 41'; Gheorghe 67'; Mršić 73' (pen.); Nefiz (yellow card) 76' | Stadium: Şükrü Saracoğlu Stadium; Attendance: 37,456; Referee: Yaşar Kemal Uğurlu |

| 14 August 2022 2 | Ümraniyespor | 0–1 | Antalyaspor | Istanbul |
| 19:15 TRT (UTC+3) | Geraldo (yellow card) 57' | Report | Wright 59'; Aydoğdu (yellow card) 66'; Fernando (yellow card) 81' | Stadium: Atatürk Olympic Stadium; Attendance: 386; Referee: Çağdaş Altay |

| 19 August 2022 3 | Ümraniyespor | 0–1 | Galatasaray | Istanbul |
| 21:00 TRT (UTC+3) | Göksu (yellow card) 45'; Del Valle (yellow card) 55'; Gheorghe (yellow card) 72'; Gürbulak (yellow card) 76'; Sackey (yellow card) 77'; Gagnidze (yellow card) 86' | Report | Bardakcı (yellow card) 35'; Gomis 86'; Boey (yellow card) 90+2' | Stadium: Atatürk Olympic Stadium; Attendance: 12,095; Referee: Ali Şansalan |

| 27 August 2022 4 | Adana Demirspor | 1–0 | Ümraniyespor | Adana |
| 21:45 TRT (UTC+3) | Rodrigues 6' (yellow card) 82'; Dzyuba (yellow card) 44' | Report | Mršić (yellow card) 16'; Glumac (yellow card) 48' | Stadium: New Adana Stadium; Attendance: 12,356; Referee: Kadir Sağlam |

| 2 September 2022 5 | Ümraniyespor | 0–1 | Trabzonspor | Istanbul |
| 21:00 TRT (UTC+3) | | Report | Gbamin (yellow card) 27'; Bartra (yellow card) 35'; Elmalı (yellow card) 53'; Trézéguet 60' | Stadium: Recep Tayyip Erdoğan Stadium; Attendance: 5,531; Referee: Arda Kardeşler |

| 11 September 2022 6 | Gaziantep | 1–1 | Ümraniyespor | Hatay |
| 20:00 TRT (UTC+3) | Kitsiou (yellow card) 25'; Maxim 59' (pen.); Djilobodji (yellow card) 75'; Marković (yellow card) 86' | Report | Sackey (yellow card) 50'; Avounou (yellow card) 72'; Mršić 90' (pen.); Del Valle (yellow card) 90+3' | Stadium: New Hatay Stadium; Attendance: 575; Referee: Ümit Öztürk |

| 17 September 2022 7 | Ümraniyespor | 1–2 | Kasımpaşa | Istanbul |
| 17:00 TRT (UTC+3) | Geraldo (yellow card) 60'; Yılmaz (yellow card) 81'; Sackey (yellow card) 85'; Glumac (yellow card) 90+2'; Mršić 90+9' | Report | Fall (yellow card) 25'; Tırpan (yellow card) 27'; Hadergjonaj 36' (pen.) (yellow card) 53'; Ouanes (yellow card) 59'; Bahoken 83' | Stadium: Necmi Kadıoğlu Stadium; Attendance: 329; Referee: Suat Arslanboğa |

| 2 October 2022 8 | Konyaspor | 1–0 | Ümraniyespor | Konya |
| 17:00 TRT (UTC+3) | Demir 45+3' (yellow card) 45+4'; Bytyqi (yellow card) 83'; Guilherme (yellow card) 83' | Report | Ayık (yellow card) 90+4' | Stadium: Konya Metropolitan Municipality Stadium; Attendance: 12,456; Referee: Mustafa Kürşad Filiz |

| 9 October 2022 9 | Ümraniyespor | 2–2 | Kayserispor | Istanbul |
| 14:30 TRT (UTC+3) | Sackey (yellow card) 44'; Nayir 48'; Glumac 59' (yellow card) 90+2' (red card); Gürbulak (yellow card) 62'; Gheorghe (yellow card) 87' | Report | Cardoso 25'; Mensah 64' (pen.) | Stadium: Ümraniye Municipality City Stadium; Attendance: 369; Referee: Burak Şeker |

| 10 | Bye |

| 22 October 2022 11 | Ümraniyespor | 1–3 | Fatih Karagümrük | Istanbul |
| 14:30 TRT (UTC+3) | Nayir 3' | Report | Biraschi 8'; Ozdoyev (yellow card) 12'; Nicholas (yellow card) 27'; Diagne 55'; Erkin (yellow card) 76'; Borini 90' | Stadium: Ümraniye Municipality City Stadium; Attendance: 1,532; Referee: Mert Güzenge |

| 30 October 2022 12 | Beşiktaş | 5–2 | Ümraniyespor | Istanbul |
| 17:00 TRT (UTC+3) | Tosun 5', 62'; Weghorst 33', 78'; Masuaku (yellow card) 45+2'; Sanuç 48'; Saïss (yellow card) 74' | Report | Geraldo (yellow card) 14'; Del Valle 45'; Avounou 57'; Allyson (yellow card) 65'; Göksu (yellow card) 74' | Stadium: Vodafone Park; Attendance: 34,889; Referee: Tugay Kaan Numanoğlu |

| 4 November 2022 13 | Ümraniyespor | 3–1 | Alanyaspor | Istanbul |
| 20:00 TRT (UTC+3) | Nayir 21', 69'; Geraldo 38'; Atasayar (yellow card) 50' | Report | Fer (yellow card) 7'; Bayır (yellow card) 42'; Eduardo 56' | Stadium: Ümraniye Municipality City Stadium; Attendance: 1,527; Referee: Ali Şansalan |

| 12 November 2022 14 | Sivasspor | 2–2 | Ümraniyespor | Sivas |
| 14:30 TRT (UTC+3) | Yatabaré 31'; Saba (yellow card) 33'; N'Jie 59' | Report | Avounou 27'; Mršić 83' (pen.) | Stadium: New Sivas 4 Eylül Stadium; Attendance: 2,643; Referee: Yaşar Kemal Uğurlu |

| 23 December 2022 15 | Ümraniyespor | 1–3 | İstanbul Başakşehir | Istanbul |
| 20:00 TRT (UTC+3) | Nayir 17' (yellow card) 40'; Atasayar (yellow card) 28'; Ayık (yellow card) 80' | Report | Aleksić 2'; Gürler (yellow card) 45+5' (goal) 57'; Ndayishimiye 90+3' | Stadium: Ümraniye Municipality City Stadium; Attendance: 1,185; Referee: Arda Kardeşler |

| 27 December 2022 16 | Ankaragücü | 1–2 | Ümraniyespor | Ankara |
| 17:00 TRT (UTC+3) | Zahid 2'; Ciğerci (yellow card) 65' | Report | Avounou 9', 55'; Glumac (yellow card) 19'; Göksu (yellow card) 45+2'; Geraldo (yellow card) 52'; Sackey (yellow card) 57' | Stadium: Eryaman Stadium; Attendance: 5,886; Referee: Mustafa Kürşad Filiz |

| 3 January 2023 17 | Ümraniyespor | 2–2 | Hatayspor | Istanbul |
| 17:00 TRT (UTC+3) | Oğuz Gürbulak (yellow card) 30'; Durel Avounou 39'; Umut Nayir 67' (pen.); Allyson Aires dos Santos (red card) 79'; Isaac Sackey (yellow card) 90+4'; Serkan Göksu (yellow card) 90+7' | Report | El Kaabi 24'; Saba Lobjanidze 53'; Simon Falette (yellow card) 65'; Ognjen Vranješ (yellow card) 71' | Stadium: Ümraniye Municipality City Stadium; Attendance: 728; Referee: Hüseyin Göçek |

| 8 January 2023 18 | Giresunspor | 0–1 | Ümraniyespor | Giresun |
| 16:00 TRT (UTC+3) | Pérez (yellow card) 88'; Sağlam (yellow card) 90+6' | Report | Gheorghe (yellow card) 45+1'; Gürbulak (yellow card) 54'; Mršić 83'; Demir (red card) 90+7' | Stadium: Çotanak Sports Complex; Attendance: 3,724; Referee: Sarper Barış Saka |

| 15 January 2023 19 | Ümraniyespor | 0–2 | İstanbulspor | Istanbul |
| 13:30 TRT (UTC+3) | Yılmaz (yellow card) 42'; Popov (yellow card) 45+4' | Report | Eze (yellow card) 5'; Topalli (yellow card) 12'; Rroca (yellow card) 28'; Ethemi 30'; Kabasakal 45+4'; Jensen (yellow card) 84' | Stadium: Ümraniye Municipality City Stadium; Attendance: 1,399; Referee: Ali Palabıyık |

| 23 January 2023 20 | Ümraniyespor | 1–2 | Fenerbahçe | Istanbul |
| 20:00 TRT (UTC+3) | Nayir 78'; Özdemir (yellow card) 90+2'; Atasaray (yellow card) 90+10' (yellow-red card) 90+10' | Report | Lincoln (yellow card) 12'; Batshuayi 73', (yellow card) 88'; Glumac 89' (o.g.); Mor (yellow card) 90+4'; Zajc (yellow card) 90+15' | Stadium: Ümraniye Municipality City Stadium; Attendance: 2,606; Referee: Abdulkadir Bitigen |

| 28 January 2023 21 | Antalyaspor | 3–2 | Ümraniyespor | Antalya |
| 19:00 TRT (UTC+3) | Sinik (yellow card) 30'; Larsson 38'; Vural 48'; Sarı (yellow card) 76'; Fredy 90+3', (yellow card) 90+4' | Report | Nayir 33'; Ayık 56'; Sekidika (yellow card) 84' | Stadium: Antalya Stadium; Attendance: 9,443; Referee: Direnç Tonusluoğlu |

| 1 February 2023 22 | Galatasaray | 3–2 | Ümraniyespor | Istanbul |
| 20:00 TRT (UTC+3) | Bardakcı 32'; Icardi 60' (pen.), 83' | Report | Nayir 11' (yellow card) 90+2'; Gürbulak 39'; Avounou (yellow card) 45' (yellow-red card) 77' | Stadium: Nef Stadium; Referee: Cihan Aydın |

| 26 February 2023 23 | Ümraniyespor | 1–1 | Adana Demirspor | Istanbul |
| 16:00 TRT (UTC+3) | Kayode 90' | Report | Ndiaye 79' | Stadium: Ümraniye Municipality City Stadium; Referee: Atilla Karaoğlan |

| 4 March 2023 24 | Trabzonspor | 1–2 | Ümraniyespor | Trabzon |
| 16:00 TRT (UTC+3) | Yazıcı 84'; Ünüvar (yellow card) 90+8' (yellow-red card) 90+8' | Report | Epureanu (yellow card) 37'; Sekidika 51'; Nayir 65'; Gürbulak (yellow card) 76'; Özdemir (yellow card) 90+5'; Sackey (yellow card) 90+6' | Stadium: Şenol Güneş Sports Complex; Referee: Kadir Sağlam |

| 25 | Ümraniyespor | 3–0 (w/o) | Gaziantep | Istanbul |
| | | Report | | Stadium: Ümraniye Municipality City Stadium |

| 18 March 2023 26 | Kasımpaşa | 1–1 | Ümraniyespor | Istanbul |
| 13:30 TRT (UTC+3) | Fall 29'; Eysseric (yellow card) 79' | Report | Mršić 41' (pen.); Göksu (yellow card) 87' | Stadium: Recep Tayyip Erdoğan Stadium; Referee: Mustafa Kürşad Filiz |

| 2 April 2023 27 | Ümraniyespor | 2–2 | Konyaspor | Istanbul |
| 13:30 TRT (UTC+3) | Glumac (yellow card) 45+2'; Demirtaş (o.g.); Göksu (yellow card) 63'; Ayık 89' | Report | Demirbap (yellow card) 16'; Diouf 82'; Dikmen 90+7' | Stadium: Ümraniye Municipality City Stadium; Referee: Arda Kardeşler |

| 10 April 2023 28 | Kayserispor | 3–1 | Ümraniyespor | Kayseri |
| 16:00 TRT (UTC+3) | Thiam 31' (pen.); Kemen (yellow card) 44'; Mensah 53'; Parlak (yellow card) 90+1'; Ackah (yellow card) 90+1'; Cardoso (yellow card) 90+5'; Mané 90+9' | Report | Nayir 45+2'; Mršić (yellow card) 59'; Sackey (yellow card) 87' (yellow-red card) 90+8'; Yılmaz (yellow card) 90+5' | Stadium: Kadir Has Stadium; Referee: Zorbay Küçük |

| 29 | Bye |

| 18 April 2023 30 | Fatih Karagümrük | 4–2 | Ümraniyespor | Istanbul |
| 20:30 TRT (UTC+3) | Shukurov (yellow card) 34'; Diagne (yellow card) 40', (goal) 75'; Lobzhanidze 45+1'; Borini 45+6' (pen.), 52' (pen.); Drešević (yellow card) 83'; Kapacak (yellow card) 90+5'; Viviano (yellow card) 90+9' | Report | Nayir 36' (pen.); Glumac (yellow card) 45+5'; Kayode (yellow card) 45+8', (goal) 62' | Stadium: Atatürk Olympic Stadium; Referee: Ali Şansalan |

| 22 April 2023 31 | Ümraniyespor | 0–2 | Beşiktaş | Istanbul |
| 19:00 TRT (UTC+3) | | Report | Redmond 25'; Hadžiahmetović (yellow card) 46'; Aboubakar 71', (yellow card) 85' | Stadium: Ümraniye Municipality City Stadium; Referee: Cihan Aydın |

| 28 April 2023 32 | Alanyaspor | 1–0 | Ümraniyespor | Antalya |
| 20:00 TRT (UTC+3) | Hassan 4' | Report | Mršić (yellow card) 14'; Göksu (yellow card) 36' | Stadium: Kırbıyık Holding Stadium; Referee: Yaşar Kemal Uğurlu |

| 7 May 2023 33 | Ümraniyespor | 4–1 | Sivasspor | Istanbul |
| 13:30 TRT (UTC+3) | Nayir 7', 23' (pen.), 76'; Kayode (yellow card) 45', (goal) 90+1'; Özdemir (yellow card) 45+1'; Gheorghe (yellow card) 45+6'; Geraldo (yellow card) 46'; Glumac (yellow card) 62'; Esr (yellow card) 84' | Report | Gradel 34'; Yatabaré (yellow card) 45+4'; Goutas (yellow card) 64' | Stadium: Ümraniye Municipality City Stadium; Referee: Burak Şeker |

| 17 May 2023 34 | İstanbul Başakşehir | 1–1 | Ümraniyespor | Istanbul |
| 17:00 TRT (UTC+3) | Aleksić 4'; Tekdemir (red card) 7'; Özcan (yellow card) 65'; Lima (yellow card) 71' | Report | Özdemir (yellow card) 45+3'; Nayir 60' (pen.) | Stadium: Fatih Terim Stadium; Referee: Burak Pakkan |

| 21 May 2023 35 | Ümraniyespor | 1–2 | Ankaragücü | Istanbul |
| 16:00 TRT (UTC+3) | Glumac (yellow card) 8'; Nayir 26' (pen.); Gürbulak (yellow card) 76' | Report | Kitsiou (yellow card) 7'; Malcuit 18'; Kızıldağ (yellow card) 20'; Milson 71' | Stadium: Ümraniye Municipality City Stadium; Referee: Mete Kalkavan |

| 36 | Hatayspor | 0–3 (w/o) | Ümraniyespor | Hatay |
| | | Report | | Stadium: New Hatay Stadium |

| 3 June 2023 37 | Ümraniyespor | 0–1 | Giresunspor | Istanbul |
| 19:00 TRT (UTC+3) | Gürbulak (yellow card) 6'; Sackey (yellow card) 10'; Glumac (yellow card) 58'; Göksu (yellow card) 77'; Eser (yellow card) 87' | Report | Seven (yellow card) 42'; Bajić 45' | Stadium: Ümraniye Municipality City Stadium; Referee: Zorbay Küçük |

| 7 June 2023 38 | İstanbulspor | 4–0 | Ümraniyespor | Istanbul |
| 20:00 TRT (UTC+3) | Topalli 45'; Rroca 61', (yellow card) 89'; Ergün (yellow card) 89'; Sarıkaya 90+4', (yellow card) 90+6'; Eze 90+7' | Report | Şanlıtürk (yellow card) 72' | Stadium: Necmi Kadıoğlu Stadium; Referee: Cihan Aydın |

=== Turkish Cup ===
| 9 November 2022 Fourth round | Ümraniyespor | 4–0 | Efeler 09 | Istanbul |
| 13:00 TRT (UTC+3) | Mršić (yellow card) 12' (goal) 28' (pen.); Bettaieb 58'; Yılmaz (yellow card) 65'; Hacımustafaoğlu 67'; Gheorghe 74'; Nefiz (yellow card) 75' | Report | Kurt (yellow card) 27' | Stadium: Ümraniye Municipality City Stadium; Referee: Burak Pakkan |

| 20 December 2022 Fifth round | Kasımpaşa | 1–2 | Ümraniyespor | Istanbul |
| 13:00 TRT (UTC+3) | Graovac (yellow card) 58'; Petretta (yellow card) 81'; Mallı 88' | Report | Mršić 59' (pen.); Mimaroğlu 86'; Nayir (yellow card) 89' | Stadium: Recep Tayyip Erdoğan Stadium; Referee: Ali Palabıyık |

| 18 January 2023 Round of 16 | Ümraniyespor | 1–4 (a.e.t.) | Trabzonspor | Istanbul |
| 20:30 TRT (UTC+3) | Nayir 12'; Eser (yellow card) 25'; Bettaieb (yellow card) 27'; Geraldo (yellow card) 105+3'; Glumac (yellow card) 108' | Report | Boşluk (yellow card) 37'; Hugo 90+3'; Djaniny (yellow card) 90+6'; Bakasetas (yellow card) 94', (penalty missed) 101'; Yazıcı 104', 111' (pen.); Gómez 114' | Stadium: Ümraniye Municipality City Stadium; Referee: Ümit Öztürk |
