= 2022–23 Sivasspor season =

Sivasspor
2022–23 season
- President: Mecnun Otyakmaz
- Head coach: Rıza Çalımbay
- Stadium: New Sivas 4 Eylül Stadium
- Süper Lig: 14th
- Turkish Cup: Semi-finals
- Turkish Super Cup: Runners-up
- UEFA Europa League: Play-off round
- UEFA Europa Conference League: Round of 16
- Top goalscorer: League: Max Gradel (7 goals); All: Mustapha Yatabaré (12 goals)
Home colours	Away colours	Third colours

The 2022–23 season was the 56th in the history of Sivasspor and their sixth consecutive season in the top flight. The club participated in the Süper Lig, the Turkish Cup, Turkish Super Cup, the UEFA Europa League, and the UEFA Europa Conference League.

== Players ==
=== Squad ===
As of 29 January 2023

Note: Flags indicate national team as defined under FIFA eligibility rules; some limited exceptions apply. Players may hold more than one non-FIFA nationality.

No.	Pos.	Nation	Player
2	DF	TUR	Murat Paluli
3	DF	TUR	Uğur Çiftçi
4	DF	GAB	Aaron Appindangoyé
5	MF	GHA	Isaac Cofie
6	DF	GRE	Dimitrios Goutas
7	FW	CIV	Max Gradel
8	MF	GER	Robin Yalçın
9	FW	MLI	Mustapha Yatabaré
10	FW	CMR	Clinton N'Jie
13	DF	TUR	Alaaddin Okumuş
14	DF	MLI	Samba Camara
15	MF	GRE	Charis Charisis
16	GK	TUR	Baver Kuçkar
17	MF	GER	Erdoğan Yeşilyurt

No.	Pos.	Nation	Player
18	GK	TUR	Emre Satılmış
19	FW	POL	Karol Angielski
23	MF	NOR	Fredrik Ulvestad
24	FW	ESP	Samuel Sáiz
25	GK	TUR	Muammer Yıldırım
26	FW	NGR	Ahmed Musa
28	MF	CIV	Kader Keïta
30	FW	ECU	Jordy Caicedo (on loan from Tigres UANL)
35	GK	TUR	Ali Şaşal Vural
37	MF	TUR	Hakan Arslan
58	DF	TUR	Ziya Erdal
88	DF	TUR	Caner Osmanpaşa
90	FW	NGR	Leke James
96	DF	TUR	Mehmet Albayrak

=== Out of squad ===
Note: Flags indicate national team as defined under FIFA eligibility rules; some limited exceptions apply. Players may hold more than one non-FIFA nationality.

No.	Pos.	Nation	Player
22	MF	SRB	Armin Đerlek

=== Out on loan ===
Note: Flags indicate national team as defined under FIFA eligibility rules; some limited exceptions apply. Players may hold more than one non-FIFA nationality.

No.	Pos.	Nation	Player
—	DF	TUR	Emirhan Tak (at Tuzlaspor until 30 June 2023)
—	DF	TUR	Özkan Yiğiter (at Gençlerbirliği until 30 June 2023)
—	MF	TUR	Furkan Sağman (at Sivas Belediyespor until 30 June 2023)
—	FW	TUR	Halit Çokyaşar (at Amed until 30 June 2023)

No.	Pos.	Nation	Player
—	FW	TUR	Muhammed Emin Ergin (at Sapanca Gençlikspor until 30 June 2023)
—	FW	TUR	Arda Keser (at Sivas Belediyespor until 30 June 2023)
—	FW	TUR	Eren Şahin (at Bayburt Özel İdarespor until 30 June 2023)

== Pre-season and friendlies ==
Win Draw Loss

11 July 2022 Friendly	Sivasspor (Turkey)	1–0	(Azerbaijan) Neftçi	Gerede
11:30 TRT (UTC+3)	Cofie 18'			Stadium: Esentepe Hotel 1 Nolu Futbol Sahası

20 July 2022 Friendly	Szombathelyi Haladás (Hungary)	0–0	(Turkey) Sivasspor	Szombathely, Hungary
18:00 CEST (UTC+2)				Stadium: Haladás Sportkomplexum

22 July 2022 Friendly	Sivasspor (Turkey)	1–1	(Czech Republic) Sigma Olomouc	Friedberg, Austria
18:00 CEST (UTC+2)	Yeşilyurt 50'		Růsek 42'	Stadium: Sportzentrum Friedberg

25 July 2022 Friendly	Sivasspor (Turkey)	2–0	(United Arab Emirates) Sharjah	Bad Blumau, Austria
18:00 CEST (UTC+2)	Yatabaré 14'; Yeşilyurt 31'			Stadium: Safenstadion

25 September 2022 Friendly	Sivasspor (Turkey)	3–0	(Turkey) Tokat Belediye Plevnespor	Sivas
15:00 TRT (UTC+3)	Saba 18'; Yeşilyurt 33'; Arslan 55'			Stadium: Vali Lütfullah Bilgin Tesisleri

2 December 2022 Friendly	Sivasspor (Turkey)	2–0	(Albania) FK Partizani	Belek
16:00 TRT (UTC+3)	Yeşilyurt 27'; Yatabaré 42'

8 December 2022 Friendly	Sivasspor (Turkey)	2–1	(Germany) 1. FC Saarbrücken	Aksu
15:00 TRT (UTC+3)	Angielski 34' (pen.); Saba 63'		Steinkötter 71'	Stadium: Fanatic Tour Topkapi & Kremlin Palace Football Center

10 December 2022 Friendly	Ankaragücü (Turkey)	0–2	(Turkey) Sivasspor	Antalya
12:30 TRT (UTC+3)			Yatabaré 31'; Saba 41'	Stadium: Titanic Hotel Spor Kompleks Field 1

25 February 2023 Friendly	Sivasspor (Turkey)	3–0	(Turkey) Sivas Belediyespor	Sivas
14:00 TRT (UTC+3)	Arslan 25'; Appindangoyé 61'; Caicedo 90'			Stadium: Vali Lütfullah Bilgin Tesisleri

== Competitions ==
=== Overall record ===
Competition	First match	Last match	Starting round	Final position	Record							
Competition	First match	Last match	Starting round	Final position	Pld	W	D	L	GF	GA	GD	Win %
Süper Lig	6 August 2022	6 June 2023	Matchday 1	14th	36	11	8	17	46	54	−8	30.56
Turkish Cup	20 December 2022	24 May 2023	Fifth round	Semi-finals	5	3	1	1	11	5	+6	60.00
Turkish Super Cup	30 July 2022		Final	Runners-up	1	0	0	1	0	4	−4	0.00
UEFA Europa League	18 August 2022	25 August 2022	Play-off round	Play-off round	2	0	0	2	1	5	−4	0.00
UEFA Europa Conference League	8 September 2022	16 March 2023	Group stage	Round of 16	8	3	2	3	12	12	+0	37.50
Total					52	17	11	24	70	80	−10	32.69

Source: Soccerway

=== Süper Lig ===
==== League table ====
Pos	Team	Pld	W	D	L	GF	GA	GD	Pts	Qualification or relegation
12	İstanbulspor	36	12	5	19	47	63	−16	41 (Note: Head-to-head points: İstanbulspor 11, Antalyaspor 10, Sivasspor 8, Alanyaspor 4.)	
13	Antalyaspor	36	11	8	17	46	55	−9	41	
14	Sivasspor	36	11	8	17	46	54	−8	41	
15	Alanyaspor	36	11	8	17	54	70	−16	41	
16	Giresunspor (R)	36	10	10	16	42	60	−18	40	Relegation to TFF First League

Source: Süper Lig
Rules for classification: 1) Points; 2) Head-to-head points; 3) Head-to-head goal difference; 4) Head-to-head goals scored; 5) Goal difference; 6) Goals scored; 7) Play-off.
(R) Relegated

==== Results summary ====
Overall								Home						Away					
Pld	W	D	L	GF	GA	GD	Pts	W	D	L	GF	GA	GD	W	D	L	GF	GA	GD
36	11	8	17	46	54	−8	41	5	7	6	23	21	+2	6	1	11	23	33	−10

Source: Spor Toto Süper Lig

==== Results by round ====
Round	1	2	3	4	5	6	7	8	9	10	11	12	13	14	15	16	17	18	19	20	21	22	23	24	25	26	27	28	29	30	31	32	33	34	35	36	37	38
Ground	H	A	H	A	H	H	A	H	A	H	A	H	A	H	A	H	A		A	A	H	A	H	A	A	H	A	H	A	H	A	H	A	H	A	H		H
Result	D	L	D	L	D	D	L	L	W	W	L	L	L	D	W	L	D	B	L	W	L	W	W	L	L	W	W	D	L	W	W	L	L	L	L	W	B	D
Position	10	15	13	16	15	15	17	17	15	12	13	15	17	17	16	17	17	17	17	16	17	15	13	14	15	12	10	12	13	10	10	11	11	11	14	12	14	14

Source: Spor Toto Süper Lig
A = Away; H = Home; B = Bye; W = Win; D = Draw; L = Loss

==== Matches ====
The league schedule was released on 4 July.

6 August 2022 1	Sivasspor	1–1	Gaziantep	Sivas
19:15 TRT (UTC+3)	Osmanpaşa (yellow card) 31'; Gradel 64' (pen.); Yatabaré (yellow card) 84'	Report	Maxim 22'; Djilobodji (yellow card) 39'; Hanousek (yellow card) 61'; Soyalp (yellow card) 67'	Stadium: New Sivas 4 Eylül Stadium; Attendance: 3,984; Referee: Ali Şansalan

13 August 2022 2	Adana Demirspor	3–0	Sivasspor	Adana
21:45 TRT (UTC+3)	Belhanda 41', (yellow card) 72'; Onyekuru 51'; Rakitskyi (yellow card) 56'; David 70'	Report		Stadium: New Adana Stadium; Attendance: 13,252; Referee: Mert Güzenge

22 August 2022 3	Sivasspor	1–1	Alanyaspor	Sivas
19:15 TRT (UTC+3)	Gradel 45' (pen.); Charisis (yellow card) 72'; Çiftçi (yellow card) 84'	Report	Bayır (yellow card) 81'; Doumbia 90+1'; Eduardo (yellow card) 90+4'	Stadium: New Sivas 4 Eylül Stadium; Attendance: 3,716; Referee: Ümit Öztürk

29 August 2022 4	Beşiktaş	3–1	Sivasspor	Istanbul
21:45 TRT (UTC+3)	Muleka 12', 41'; Weghorst 29'	Report	Yeşilyurt (yellow card) 39'; Arslan (yellow card) 83'; Saba 86'	Stadium: Vodafone Park; Attendance: 34,820; Referee: Volkan Bayarslan

3 September 2022 5	Sivasspor	0–0	Fatih Karagümrük	Sivas
19:15 TRT (UTC+3)	Çiftçi (yellow card) 12' (yellow card) 88' (red card)	Report	Dursun (yellow card) 44'; Borini (yellow card) 45+1'	Stadium: New Sivas 4 Eylül Stadium; Attendance: 3,089; Referee: Yasin Kol

11 September 2022 6	Sivasspor	1–1	İstanbulspor	Sivas
17:00 TRT (UTC+3)	Ulvestad (yellow card) 16' (goal) 80'; Yalçın (yellow card) 75'	Report	Ethemi 64' (yellow card) 75'; Topalli (yellow card) 69'; Kabasakal (yellow card) 79'	Stadium: New Sivas 4 Eylül Stadium; Attendance: 3,099; Referee: Hüseyin Göçek

18 September 2022 7	Ankaragücü	2–1	Sivasspor	Ankara
20:00 TRT (UTC+3)	Beridze 2'; Pedrinho (yellow card) 40'; Sowe 44'; Marlon (yellow card) 82'; Malcuit (yellow card) 90'	Report	Goutas (yellow card) 10'; Charisis (yellow card) 45+7'; N'Jie 48'; Çiftçi (yellow card) 64'; Ulvestad (yellow card) 90+5'	Stadium: Eryaman Stadium; Attendance: 298; Referee: Sarper Barış Saka

2 October 2022 8	Sivasspor	1–2	Hatayspor	Sivas
14:30 TRT (UTC+3)	Yeşilyurt 23'; Yatabaré (yellow card) 51'	Report	El Kaabi 14'; Yıldırım 20'; Ribeiro (yellow card) 41' (yellow card) 42' (red card); Kanak (yellow card) 80'; Kardeşler (yellow card) 81'; Vranješ (yellow card) 81'	Stadium: New Sivas 4 Eylül Stadium; Attendance: 3,384; Referee: Erkan Özdamar

10 October 2022 9	İstanbul Başakşehir	0–2	Sivasspor	Istanbul
20:00 TRT (UTC+3)	Ndayishimiye (yellow card) 69'; Traoré (yellow card) 90+3'	Report	Saba 45+2' (pen.), 85'	Stadium: Fatih Terim Stadium; Attendance: 2,329; Referee: Kadir Sağlam

17 October 2022 10	Sivasspor	3–0	Giresunspor	Sivas
20:00 TRT (UTC+3)	Yatabaré 35'; Saba 45'; Arslan 89'	Report	Senghor (yellow card) 71'	Stadium: New Sivas 4 Eylül Stadium; Attendance: 3,572; Referee: Bahattin Şimşek

22 October 2022 11	Trabzonspor	1–0	Sivasspor	Trabzon
17:00 TRT (UTC+3)	Hamšík 9'; Elmalı (yellow card) 33'; Gómez (yellow card) 90+1'	Report	Keïta (yellow card) 86'; Gradel (yellow card) 90+2'	Stadium: Şenol Güneş Sports Complex; Attendance: 22,058; Referee: Abdulkadir Bitigen

31 October 2022 12	Sivasspor	0–2	Antalyaspor	Sivas
20:00 TRT (UTC+3)	Arslan (yellow card) 3'; Gradel (yellow card) 49'	Report	Sarı (yellow card) 10'; Yeşilyurt 18' (o.g.); Wright 24'; Uysal (yellow card) 84'	Stadium: New Sivas 4 Eylül Stadium; Attendance: 3,612; Referee: Mete Kalkavan

7 November 2022 13	Fenerbahçe	1–0	Sivasspor	Istanbul
20:00 TRT (UTC+3)	Crespo (yellow card) 25'; Mor (yellow card) 40'; Batshuayi (yellow card) 45+4' (yellow-red card) 48'; Valencia 55' (pen.); Zajc (yellow card) 75'; Aziz (yellow card) 87'; Bayındır (yellow card) 90+7'	Report	Yeşilyurt (yellow card) 19'; Keïta (yellow card) 35'; Yalçın (yellow card) 60'; Osmanpaşa (yellow card) 69'; Saba (yellow card) 89'; Erdal (yellow card) 90+9'	Stadium: Şükrü Saracoğlu Stadium; Attendance: 40,349; Referee: Hüseyin Göçek

12 November 2022 14	Sivasspor	2–2	Ümraniyespor	Sivas
14:30 TRT (UTC+3)	Yatabaré 31'; Saba (yellow card) 33'; N'Jie 59'	Report	Avounou 27'; Mršić 83' (pen.)	Stadium: New Sivas 4 Eylül Stadium; Attendance: 2,643; Referee: Yaşar Kemal Uğurlu

24 December 2022 15	Kasımpaşa	1–2	Sivasspor	Istanbul
16:00 TRT (UTC+3)	Fall (yellow card) 21'; Ouanes 39' (yellow card) 74'; Petretta (yellow card) 64'; Hajradinović (yellow card) 90+10'	Report	Saba 14' (yellow card) 90+6'; Charisis (yellow card) 49'; Gradel 65'	Stadium: Recep Tayyip Erdoğan Stadium; Attendance: 1,372; Referee: Sarper Barış Saka

29 December 2022 16	Sivasspor	1–2	Galatasaray	Sivas
17:00 TRT (UTC+3)	Saba (yellow card) 23'; Çiftçi (yellow card) 62'; Yeşilyurt (yellow card) 70' (yellow-red card) 90+9' (goal) 80'	Report	Mertens 27' (yellow card) 59'; van Aanholt (yellow card) 34'; Boey (yellow card) 44'; Oliveira (yellow card) 48'; Yılmaz 90+5' (yellow card) 90+10'	Stadium: New Sivas 4 Eylül Stadium; Attendance: 9,532; Referee: Erkan Özdamar

4 January 2023 17	Konyaspor	2–2	Sivasspor	Konya
20:00 TRT (UTC+3)	Paz (yellow card) 04'; Demir 22' (yellow card) 42'; Hadžiahmetović 56' (pen.); Ikpeazu (yellow card) 90+4'; Çekiçi (yellow card) 90+5'	Report	Gradel 34' (pen.); Charisis 79'; Yalçın (yellow card) 90+3'	Stadium: Konya Metropolitan Municipality Stadium; Attendance: 6,612; Referee: Ümit Öztürk

18	Bye

13 January 2023 19	Kayserispor	4–1	Sivasspor	Kayseri
19:00 TRT (UTC+3)	Hosseini 23' (yellow card) 80'; Kemen 31', 69'; Sazdağı 41'; Kolovetsios (yellow card) 80'	Report	Osmanpaşa (yellow card) 25'; Ulvestad (yellow card) 40'; Yalçın 52' (yellow card) 80'; Yeşilyurt (yellow card) 54'; Erdal (yellow card) 80'	Stadium: Kadir Has Stadium; Attendance: 6,838; Referee: Arda Kardeşler

22 January 2023 20	Gaziantep	1–2	Sivasspor	Gaziantep
13:30 TRT (UTC+3)	Kitsiou (yellow card) 4'; Djilobodji (yellow card) 53'; Eskihellaç 60'; Artan (yellow card) 67'	Report	Yatabaré 17'; Osmanpaşa 48'	Stadium: Gaziantep Stadium; Attendance: 4,710; Referee: Cihan Aydın

28 January 2023 21	Sivasspor	1–2	Adana Demirspor	Sivas
13:30 TRT (UTC+3)	Cofie 62'	Report	Akbaba 41'; Akintola 56'; Çetin (yellow card) 76'; Stambouli (yellow card) 77'	Stadium: New Sivas 4 Eylül Stadium; Attendance: 963; Referee: Burak Pakkan

31 January 2023 22	Alanyaspor	0–3	Sivasspor	Antalya
17:00 TRT (UTC+3)	Rassoul (yellow card) 52'; Doumbia (yellow card) 55'	Report	Yatabaré 32', 45+2'; Gradel 50'; Yalçın (yellow card) 76'; Cofie (yellow card) 90+5'	Stadium: Kırbıyık Holding Stadium; Referee: Yiğit Arslan

4 February 2023 23	Sivasspor	1–0	Beşiktaş	Sivas
16:00 TRT (UTC+3)	Cofie (yellow card) 20'; Sáiz 23' (yellow card) 45'	Report	Masuaku (yellow card) 45+5'; Welinton (yellow card) 88'	Stadium: New Sivas 4 Eylül Stadium; Referee: Zorbay Küçük

4 March 2023 24	Fatih Karagümrük	4–3	Sivasspor	Istanbul
13:30 TRT (UTC+3)	Borini (yellow card) 34'; Diagne 45+4', 53', 80'; Ozdoyev 69'; Bertolacci (yellow card) 73'; Ricci (yellow card) 88'	Report	Caicedo 27'; Goutas (yellow card) 40'; James 90+1', 90+6'	Stadium: Atatürk Olympic Stadium; Referee: Ümit Öztürk

13 March 2023 25	İstanbulspor	3–0	Sivasspor	Istanbul
20:00 TRT (UTC+3)	Ethemi 7' (pen.); Ba (yellow card) 53'; Duhaney 59'; Lokilo (yellow card) 66' (goal) 88'	Report	Camara (yellow card) 35'; Gradel (yellow card) 80' (yellow-red card) 80'; Sáiz (yellow card) 90+4'	Stadium: Necmi Kadıoğlu Stadium; Referee: Halil Umut Meler

19 March 2023 26	Sivasspor	2–0	Ankaragücü	Sivas
16:00 TRT (UTC+3)	Cofie 23'; Sáiz 77' (pen.)	Report		Stadium: New Sivas 4 Eylül Stadium; Referee: Suat Arslanboğa

27	Hatayspor	0–3 (w/o)	Sivasspor	Hatay
		Report		Stadium: New Hatay Stadium

9 April 2023 28	Sivasspor	1–1	İstanbul Başakşehir	Sivas
16:00 TRT (UTC+3)	Duarte 37' (o.g.); Erdal (yellow card) 85'; Appindangoyé (yellow card) 90+2'	Report	Szysz 61'	Stadium: New Sivas 4 Eylül Stadium; Referee: Arda Kardeşler

16 April 2023 29	Giresunspor	1–0	Sivasspor	Giresun
16:00 TRT (UTC+3)	Campuzano 18'; Bilazer (yellow card) 75'; Sainz (yellow card) 85'; Serginho (yellow card) 90+6'	Report	Gradel (yellow card) 85'; Arslan (yellow card) 87'	Stadium: Çotanak Sports Complex; Referee: Yaşar Kemal Uğurlu

20 April 2023 30	Sivasspor	4–1	Trabzonspor	Sivas
20:30 TRT (UTC+3)	Sáiz 27' (pen.), 58'; Yeşilyurt 37'; Erdal (yellow card) 49'; Caicedo 90+3'	Report	Marković 11'; Larsen (red card) 22'; Denswil (yellow card) 75'	Stadium: New Sivas 4 Eylül Stadium; Referee: Bahattin Şimşek

24 April 2023 31	Antalyaspor	1–2	Sivasspor	Antalya
20:00 TRT (UTC+3)	Larsson 48'	Report	Yatabaré 4', (yellow card) 29'; Gradel 22' (pen.); Vural (yellow card) 73'	Stadium: Antalya Stadium; Referee: Abdulkadir Bitigen

29 April 2023 32	Sivasspor	1–3	Fenerbahçe	Sivas
19:00 TRT (UTC+3)	Caicedo 76'	Report	Rossi 22'; Kadıoğlu 45+1', 45+10'; Kahveci (red card) 45+5'; Osayi-Samuel (yellow card) 60'; Arão (yellow card) 71'; Eğribayat (yellow card) 82'; Yandaş (yellow card) 83'	Stadium: New Sivas 4 Eylül Stadium; Referee: Zorbay Küçük

7 May 2023 33	Ümraniyespor	4–1	Sivasspor	Istanbul
13:30 TRT (UTC+3)	Nayir 7', 23' (pen.), 76'; Kayode (yellow card) 45', (goal) 90+1'; Özdemir (yellow card) 45+1'; Gheorghe (yellow card) 45+6'; Geraldo (yellow card) 46'; Glumac (yellow card) 62'; Esr (yellow card) 84'	Report	Gradel 34'; Yatabaré (yellow card) 45+4'; Goutas (yellow card) 64'	Stadium: Ümraniye Municipality City Stadium; Referee: Burak Şeker

16 May 2023 34	Sivasspor	1–2	Kasımpaşa	Sivas
17:00 TRT (UTC+3)	Goutas (yellow card) 21'; Fredrik Ulvestad (yellow card) 45+2'; Yeşilyurt (yellow card) 90+1'; Gökay 90+7'	Report	Ben Ouanes 68', (yellow card) 78'; Fall 85'; Güvenç (red card) 90+1'	Stadium: New Sivas 4 Eylül Stadium; Referee: Ali Şansalan

20 May 2023 35	Galatasaray	2–0	Sivasspor	Istanbul
19:00 TRT (UTC+3)	Icardi 13', 63'; Mertens (yellow card) 55'	Report	Yalçın (yellow card) 45+1'	Stadium: Nef Stadium; Referee: Arda Kardeşler

30 May 2023 36	Sivasspor	1–0	Konyaspor	Sivas
20:00 TRT (UTC+3)	James 17'; Sáiz (yellow card) 70'	Report	Calvo (yellow card) 50'; Demirbağ (yellow card) 78'	Stadium: New Sivas 4 Eylül Stadium; Referee: Bahattin Şimşek

37	Bye

6 June 2023 38	Sivasspor	1–1	Kayserispor	Sivas
17:00 TRT (UTC+3)	Osmanpaşa 10'	Report	Uzodimma 18'; Thiam (yellow card) 51'	Stadium: New Sivas 4 Eylül Stadium; Referee: Burak Pakkan

=== Turkish Cup ===
20 December 2022 Fifth round	Sivasspor	5–2	Esenler Erokspor	Sivas
15:00 TRT (UTC+3)	Yatabare 11', 25', 44'; Yeşilyurt 52'; Gradel 79' (pen.)	Report	Furat 36'; Baştan 59'	Stadium: New Sivas 4 Eylül Stadium

17 January 2023 Round of 16	Sivasspor	3–0	Karacabey Belediyespor	Sivas
14:30 TRT (UTC+3)	Arslan 38', 74'; N'Jie 84'	Report		Stadium: New Sivas 4 Eylül Stadium

Quarter-finals	Sivasspor	3–0 (w/o)	Gaziantep
Note: Gaziantep FK withdrew from the tournament due to the 2023 Turkey–Syria earthquake. Sivasspor, therefore, were awarded a 3–0 win, advancing to the semi-finals.

3 May 2023 Semi-final first leg	Sivasspor	0–0	Fenerbahçe	Sivas
20:30 TRT (UTC+3)	Çiftçi (yellow card) 55'	Report	Kahveci (yellow card) 74'	Stadium: New Sivas 4 Eylül Stadium; Referee: Atilla Karaoğlan

24 May 2023 Semi-final second leg	Fenerbahçe	3–0 (3–0 agg.)	Sivasspor	Istanbul
20:30 TRT (UTC+3)	Kadıoğlu 47'; Batshuayi 58'; King 85'	Report	Charisis (yellow card) 18'; Sáiz (yellow card) 59'	Stadium: Şükrü Saracoğlu Stadium; Referee: Volkan Bayarslan

=== Turkish Super Cup ===
30 July 2022 Final	Trabzonspor	4–0	Sivasspor	Istanbul
20:45 TRT (UTC+3)	Cornelius (yellow card) 30', (goal) 37', 51'; Stryger Larsen 64'; Bakasetas 76' (pen.); Gedikli (yellow card) 90+1', (penalty missed) 90+5'	Report		Stadium: Atatürk Olympic Stadium; Attendance: 46,732; Referee: Mete Kalkavan

=== UEFA Europa League ===
==== Play-off round ====
The draw for the play-off round was held on 2 August 2022.

18 August 2022 First leg	Malmö FF (Sweden)	3–1	(Turkey) Sivasspor	Malmö, Sweden
19:00 CEST (UTC+2)	Zeidan 18'; Christiansen 37'; Rakip (yellow card) 38'; Moisander 68', (yellow card) 86'; Lomotey (yellow card) 83'	Report	James 30'; Yalçın (yellow card) 36'; Gradel (yellow card) 52'; Goutas (yellow card) 52'; Yatabaré (yellow card) 78'	Stadium: Eleda Stadion; Attendance: 12,167; Referee: Willie Collum (Scotland)

25 August 2022 Second leg	Sivasspor (Turkey)	0–2 (1–5 agg.)	(Sweden) Malmö FF	Sivas
20:00 TRT (UTC+3)	Keïta (yellow card) 29'; Yeşilyurt (yellow card) 44'; James (yellow card) 60'; Gradel (yellow card) 76'	Report	Rakip (yellow card) 13'; Birmančević (yellow card) 21', (goal) 76'; Beijmo (yellow card) 56'; Kiese Thelin 90'	Stadium: New Sivas 4 Eylül Stadium; Attendance: 16,873; Referee: Srđan Jovanović (Serbia)

=== UEFA Europa Conference League ===
==== Group stage ====
The draw for the group stage was held on 26 August 2022.

Pos	Team	Pld	W	D	L	GF	GA	GD	Pts	Qualification	SIV	CLJ	SLP	BLK
1	(Turkey) Sivasspor	6	3	2	1	11	7	+4	11	Advance to round of 16	—	3–0	1–1	3–4
2	(Romania) CFR Cluj	6	3	1	2	5	5	0	10	Advance to knockout round play-offs	0–1	—	2–0	1–0
3	(Czech Republic) Slavia Prague	6	2	2	2	6	7	−1	8		1–1	0–1	—	3–2
4	(Kosovo) Ballkani	6	1	1	4	8	11	−3	4		1–2	1–1	0–1	—

Source: UEFA
Rules for classification: Group stage tiebreakers

8 September 2022 1	Sivasspor (Turkey)	1–1	(Czech Republic) Slavia Prague	Sivas
21:00 (22:00 TRT)	Saba 27'	Report	Olayinka 4'	Stadium: New Sivas 4 Eylül Stadium; Attendance: 5,472; Referee: Fran Jović (Croatia)

15 September 2022 2	CFR Cluj (Romania)	0–1	(Turkey) Sivasspor	Cluj-Napoca, Romania
18:45 (19:45 EEST)		Report	Gradel 28' (pen.)	Stadium: Stadionul Dr. Constantin Rădulescu; Attendance: 7,026; Referee: Allard Lindhout (Netherlands)

6 October 2022 3	Sivasspor (Turkey)	3–4	(Kosovo) Ballkani	Sivas
18:45 (19:45 TRT)	Ulvestad 1'; Yeşilyurt 75'; Yatabaré 90+1'	Report	Ar. Thaqi 20'; Potoku 31'; Korenica 66'; Krasniqi 90+4'	Stadium: New Sivas 4 Eylül Stadium; Attendance: 4,336; Referee: José Luis Munuera Montero (Spain)

13 October 2022 4	Ballkani (Kosovo)	1–2	(Turkey) Sivasspor	Pristina, Kosovo
21:00	Ar. Thaqi 36'	Report	Arslan 72'; Angielski 81'	Stadium: Fadil Vokrri Stadium; Attendance: 12,650; Referee: Manuel Schüttengruber (Austria)

27 October 2022 5	Sivasspor (Turkey)	3–0	(Romania) CFR Cluj	Sivas
21:00 (22:00 TRT)	Yatabaré 22', 73'; Janga 64' (o.g.)	Report		Stadium: New Sivas 4 Eylül Stadium; Attendance: 6,050; Referee: Rohit Saggi (Norway)

3 November 2022 6	Slavia Prague (Czech Republic)	1–1	(Turkey) Sivasspor	Prague, Czech Republic
18:45	Goutas 65' (o.g.)	Report	Gradel 28' (pen.)	Stadium: Fortuna Arena; Attendance: 18,132; Referee: Rade Obrenović (Slovenia)

==== Knockout phase ====
===== Round of 16 =====
The draw for the round of 16 was held on 24 February 2023.

9 March 2023 First leg	Fiorentina (Italy)	1–0	(Turkey) Sivasspor	Florence, Italy
21:00 CET (UTC+1)	Amrabat (yellow card) 58'; Jović (yellow card) 62'; Barák 69'; Cabral (yellow card) 83'; Biraghi (yellow card) 90+1'; Dodô (yellow card) 90+5'	Report	Sáiz (yellow card) 42'; Cofie (yellow card) 90+3'; Gradel (red card) 90+4'	Stadium: Stadio Artemio Franchi; Attendance: 16,255; Referee: Enea Jorgji (Albania)

16 March 2023 Second leg	Sivasspor (Turkey)	1–4 (1–5 agg.)	(Italy) Fiorentina	Sivas
20:45 TRT (UTC+3)	Yeşilyurt 35'; Goutas (yellow card) 63'; Ulvestad (yellow card) 76'; Arslan (red card) 81'; Yeşilyurt (yellow card) 90+2'	Report	Cabral 44'; Milenković 62'; Martínez Quarta (yellow card) 65'; Goutas 78' (o.g.); Castrovilli 89'; Milenković (yellow card) 90+2'	Stadium: New Sivas 4 Eylül Stadium; Attendance: 17,864; Referee: Nikola Dabanović (Montenegro)
