= 2024–25 TFF 1. Lig =

24th season of TFF 1. Lig

TFF 1. Lig
- Season: 2024–25
- Dates: 9 August 2024 – 29 May 2025
- Champions: Kocaelispor (4th title)
- Promoted: Kocaelispor; Gençlerbirliği; Fatih Karagümrük
- Relegated: Adanaspor; Ankaragücü; Şanlıurfaspor; Yeni Malatyaspor
- Matches: 360
- Goals: 1,162 (3.23 per match)
- Top goalscorer: Wesley (22 goals)
- Biggest home win: Boluspor 10–1 Yeni Malatyaspor (4 May 2025)
- Biggest away win: Yeni Malatyaspor 0–9 Iğdır (27 April 2025)
- Highest scoring: Boluspor 10–1 Yeni Malatyaspor (4 May 2025)
- Longest losing run: Yeni Malatyaspor (38 matches)
- All statistics correct as of 30 November 2024.

The 2024–25 TFF 1. Lig was the 24th season since the league was established in 2001 and 62nd season of the second-level football league of Turkey since its establishment in 1963–64.

== Teams ==
- Eyüpspor, Göztepe and Bodrum promoted to 2024–25 Süper Lig.
- İstanbulspor, Pendikspor, Fatih Karagümrük and Ankaragücü relegated from 2023–24 Süper Lig.
- Esenler Erokspor, Amedspor and Iğdır promoted from 2023–24 TFF Second League.
- Giresunspor, Altay and Tuzlaspor relegated to 2024–25 TFF Second League.

=== Stadiums and locations ===
Location of teams in 2024–25 TFF 1. Lig
Clubs located in Istanbul

Team	Home city/borough	Home province	Stadium	Capacity
Adanaspor	Adana	Adana	New Adana Stadium	33,543
Amedspor	Diyarbakır	Diyarbakır	Diyarbakır Stadium	33,000
Ankaragücü	Ankara	Ankara	Eryaman Stadium	20,560
Bandırmaspor	Bandırma	Balıkesir	17 Eylül Stadium	12,725
Boluspor	Bolu	Bolu	Bolu Atatürk Stadium	8,456
Çorum	Çorum	Çorum	Çorum City Stadium	15,000
Erzurumspor	Erzurum	Erzurum	Kazım Karabekir Stadium	21,374
Esenler Erokspor	Esenler	Istanbul	Esenler Stadium	5,296
Gençlerbirliği	Yenimahalle	Ankara	Eryaman Stadium	20,560
Iğdır	Iğdır	Iğdır	Iğdır City Stadium	2,700
İstanbulspor	Büyükçekmece	Istanbul	Esenyurt Necmi Kadıoğlu Stadium	7,500
Keçiörengücü	Keçiören	Ankara	Ankara Aktepe Stadium	4,883
Kocaelispor	İzmit	Kocaeli	Kocaeli Stadium	34,712
Manisa	Manisa	Manisa	Manisa 19 Mayıs Stadium	16,066
Pendikspor	Pendik	Istanbul	Pendik Stadium	2,500
Sakaryaspor	Adapazarı	Sakarya	New Sakarya Stadium	28,154
Şanlıurfaspor	Şanlıurfa	Şanlıurfa	Şanlıurfa 11 Nisan Stadium	28,965
Ümraniyespor	Ümraniye	Istanbul	Ümraniye Municipality City Stadium	3,513
Yeni Malatyaspor	Malatya	Malatya	New Malatya Stadium	27,044

=== Personnel and sponsors ===
Team	Manager	Captain	Kit manufacturer	Shirt sponsor
Adanaspor	(Turkey) Hakan Keleş	(Turkey) Fatih Kurucuk	Adidas	None
Amedspor	(Turkey) Servet Çetin	(Turkey) Uğur Gezer	Nike	FIRIN-Ci
Ankaragücü	(Turkey) Mesut Bakkal	(Turkey) Mahmut Tekdemir	Umbro	Astor Enerji
Bandırmaspor	(Turkey) Mustafa Gürsel	(Turkey) Atınç Nukan	Umbro	Teksüt
Boluspor	(Turkey) Yalçın Koşukavak	(Turkey) Çağlar Şahin Akbaba	New Balance	None
Çorum	(Turkey) Tuncay Şanlı	(Turkey) Ferhat Yazgan	Nike	Mehmetçik Vakfı / Kuzey Star Shipyard
Erzurumspor	(Turkey) Hakan Kutlu	(Turkey) Mustafa Yumlu	Adidas	None / Darıca Çınar Metal / Opus Solutions / Aydınlar Otomotiv / Dunaysır Yemek
Esenler Erokspor	(Turkey) Osman Özköylü	(Turkey) Ercüment Kafkasyalı	Adidas	None
Fatih Karagümrük	(Turkey) Orhan Ak / (Turkey) Atılay Canel	(Senegal) Papy Djilobodji	Wulfz	None
Gençlerbirliği	(Turkey) Hüseyin Eroğlu	(Turkey) Yasin Güreler	Nike	Otokar
Iğdır	(Turkey) Çağdaş Çavuş	(Turkey) Hasan Hatipoğlu	Puma	Alagöz Holding / SOCAR
İstanbulspor	(Turkey) Osman Zeki Korkmaz	(Turkey) Ali Yaşar	Raru	Uğur Okulları
Keçiörengücü	(Turkey) Sedat Ağçay	(Turkey) Ali Dere	Hummel	None
Kocaelispor	(Turkey) İsmet Taşdemir	(Turkey) Gökhan Değirmenci	Hummel	Yıldız Entegre
Manisa	(Turkey) Taner Taşkın	(Turkey) Oğuz Gürbulak	Umbro	None
Pendikspor	(Turkey) Uğur Uçar	(Turkey) Erdem Özgenç	Adidas	Siltaş Yapı
Sakaryaspor	(Turkey) İlker Püren	(Turkey) Salih Dursun	Hummel	None
Şanlıurfaspor	(Turkey) Cihat Arslan	(Turkey) Muhammed Gönülaçar	Nike	None
Ümraniyespor	(Turkey) Bülent Bölükbaşı	(Croatia) Tomislav Glumac	Adidas	Central Hospital
Yeni Malatyaspor	(Turkey) Murat Uçkun	(Turkey) Abdulsamed Damlu	Nike	None

=== Managerial Changes ===
Team	Outgoing head coach	Reason for leaving	Leaving date	Successor	Start date
Adanaspor	Sol Bamba	Death	31 August 2024	François Ciccolini	1 September 2024
Ankaragücü	Cihat Arslan	Mutual agreement	15 September 2024	Kenan Koçak	18 September 2024
Adanaspor (2)	François Ciccolini	Mutual agreement	25 September 2024	Kemal Kılıç	25 September 2024
Pendikspor	Osman Özköylü	Mutual agreement	18 October 2024	Sedat Ağçay	19 October 2024
Adanaspor (3)	Kemal Kılıç	Sacked	27 October 2024	Yusuf Şimşek	31 October 2024
Amed	Ersun Yanal	Mutual agreement	30 October 2024	Servet Çetin	4 November 2024
Karagümrük	Şenol Can	Mutual agreement	4 November 2024	David Sassarini	4 November 2024
Keçiörengücü	Ersan Parlatan	Mutual agreement	13 November 2024	Erkan Sözeri	13 November 2024
Ankaragücü (2)	Kenan Koçak	Mutual agreement	20 December 2024	Kemal Özdeş	29 December 2024
Ümraniyespor	Tuncay Şanlı	Sacked	3 December 2024	Bülent Bölükbaşı	2 January 2025
Gençlerbirliği	Recep Karatepe	Mutual agreement	24 December 2024	Hüseyin Eroğlu	28 December 2024

=== Foreign players ===
Club	Player 1	Player 2	Player 3	Player 4	Player 5	Player 6	Player 7	Player 8	Player 9	Former Players
Adanaspor	(Albania) Endri Çekiçi	(Albania) Sokol Cikalleshi	(Ghana) Isaac Donkor	(Kosovo) Loret Sadiku	(Nigeria) Bonke Innocent	(Portugal) Daniel Candeias	(Romania) Andrei Ivan	(Senegal) Amadou Ciss		(Burkina Faso) Abdoul Tapsoba (Burkina Faso) Adama Fofana (France) Abdoulaye Dabo (France) Check Oumar Diakité (France) Samuel Yépié Yépié
Amedspor	(Brazil) Fernando Andrade	(Colombia) Daniel Moreno	(Croatia) Kristijan Lovrić	(France) Yohan Cassubie	(Gabon) André Poko	(Ivory Coast) Charly Keita	(Mali) Adama Traoré	(Netherlands) Bobby Adekanye	(Portugal) Bruno Lourenço	(Cameroon) Nicolas Nkoulou (Democratic Republic of the Congo) Britt Assombalonga (Ivory Coast) Max Gradel
Ankaragücü	(Bosnia and Herzegovina) Riad Bajić	(Democratic Republic of the Congo) Gaëtan Laura	(Germany) Nico Schulz	(Ghana) Owusu Kwabena	(Guinea-Bissau) Dálcio	(Jamaica) Renaldo Cephas	(Kyrgyzstan) Sirozhiddin Astanakulov	(Poland) Michał Rakoczy	(Romania) Dorin Rotariu	(Azerbaijan) Renat Dadashov (Cameroon) Christian Bassogog (Cape Verde) Garry Rodrigues (Greece) Stelios Kitsiou (Hungary) Kevin Varga (Italy) Riccardo Saponara
Bandırmaspor	(Algeria) Billel Messaoudi	(Democratic Republic of the Congo) Dieumerci Ndongala	(Democratic Republic of the Congo) Rémi Mulumba	(France) Loïs Diony	(Morocco) Mourad Louzif	(Mozambique) Mexer	(Portugal) Marco Paixão	(Portugal) Paulinho		(Azerbaijan) Coşqun Diniyev (Brazil) Rodrigo (France) Adama Diakhaby (France) Landry Nomel
Boluspor	(Albania) Dean Liço	(Angola) Mário Balbúrdia	(Azerbaijan) Vusal Isgandarli	(Brazil) Jefferson Júnior	(Guinea) Naby Oularé	(Kosovo) Florent Hasani	(Nigeria) Paul Mukairu	(Senegal) Khouma Babacar	(Serbia) Kosta Aleksić	(Angola) Estrela (Moldova) Veaceslav Posmac (North Macedonia) Daniel Avramovski (Senegal) Idrissa Camara
Çorum	(Angola) Geraldo	(Azerbaijan) Coşqun Diniyev	(Bosnia and Herzegovina) Amar Ćatić	(France) Loïck Landre	(Netherlands) Thomas Verheydt	(Republic of the Congo) Durel Avounou	(Senegal) Zargo Touré			(Algeria) Mehdi Boudjemaa (Democratic Republic of the Congo) Kabongo Kasongo (Senegal) Ismaila Sonko
Erzurumspor	(Albania) Odise Roshi	(Bulgaria) Toni Tasev	(Croatia) Tonio Teklić	(Georgia (country)) Guram Giorbelidze	(Germany) Streli Mamba	(Italy) Giovanni Crociata	(Mali) Cheikne Sylla	(Nigeria) Azubuike Okechukwu		
Esenler Erokspor	(Bosnia and Herzegovina) Hamza Čataković	(Chile) Junior Fernandes	(Finland) Janne-Pekka Laine	(Nigeria) Olarenwaju Kayode	(Republic of the Congo) Francis Nzaba	(Scotland) Ryan Jack	(Senegal) Mame Mor Faye	(Spain) Pinchi		(Brazil) Jair Tavares (Democratic Republic of the Congo) Kévin Nzuzi Mata
Fatih Karagümrük	(Austria) Nikola Dovedan	(Brazil) Serginho	(Brazil) Wesley	(Ivory Coast) Marius Trésor Doh	(Jamaica) Andre Gray	(Jamaica) Daniel Johnson	(Portugal) João Camacho	(Senegal) Papy Djilobodji		(Cameroon) Didier Lamkel Zé (Italy) Flavio Paoletti
Gençlerbirliği	(Brazil) Amilton	(Brazil) Léo Gaúcho	(Czech Republic) Matěj Hanousek	(Nigeria) Peter Etebo	(Poland) Michał Nalepa	(Portugal) Joca	(Romania) Daniel Popa	(Slovenia) Žan Žužek		(Mali) Mustapha Yatabaré (Senegal) Moussa Djitté (Syria) Aias Aosman
Iğdır	(Belgium) Gianni Bruno	(Brazil) Thuram	(France) Valentin Eysseric	(Guinea) Antoine Conte	(Mali) Aly Mallé	(Morocco) Adrien Regattin	(North Macedonia) Daniel Avramovski	(North Macedonia) Valon Ethemi		(Albania) Dean Liço (Angola) Marcos Silva (Germany) Noel Niemann (Mozambique) Guima (Serbia) Kosta Aleksić
İstanbulspor	(England) Demeaco Duhaney	(Gabon) David Sambissa	(The Gambia) Alieu Cham	(Kosovo) Florian Loshaj	(Lithuania) Modestas Vorobjovas	(Mali) Gaoussou Diarra	(North Macedonia) Mario Krstovski	(Senegal) Racine Coly		(Brazil) Jackson (Ivory Coast) Djakaridja Junior Traoré (Kosovo) Jetmir Topalli (Nigeria) Michael Ologo (North Macedonia) Valon Ethemi
Keçiörengücü	(Albania) Eduard Rroca	(Angola) Marcos Silva	(France) Aliou Traoré	(France) Malaly Dembélé	(Nigeria) Francis Ezeh	(Senegal) Mame Biram Diouf	(Senegal) Moustapha Camara	(Sierra Leone) Steven Caulker		(Albania) Kristal Abazaj (Brazil) Ramon Vinicius (Ivory Coast) William Togui
Kocaelispor	(Brazil) Marcão	(Cape Verde) Ryan Mendes	(Croatia) Josip Vuković	(Croatia) Mijo Caktaš	(Gabon) Aaron Appindangoyé	(Honduras) Rigoberto Rivas	(Portugal) Pedrinho			(Georgia (country)) Giorgi Beridze (Portugal) Daniel Candeias
Manisa	(Belgium) Dino Arslanagić	(Bulgaria) Georgi Minchev	(Ivory Coast) Moryké Fofana	(Mali) Birama Touré	(Mali) Demba Diallo	(Nigeria) Bede Osuji	(Senegal) Mamadou Cissokho	(Spain) Dani Ramírez		(Bosnia and Herzegovina) Armin Hodžić (Ghana) Kwasi Wriedt (Togo) Philip Awuku
Pendikspor	(Brazil) Welinton	(Greece) Stelios Kitsiou	(Kosovo) Jetmir Topalli	(Nigeria) Emeka Eze	(Portugal) Sequeira	(Serbia) Đorđe Denić	(Spain) Adam Mulele	(Spain) Samuel Sáiz	(Venezuela) Yonathan Del Valle	(Brazil) Sandro Lima (Suriname) Leandro Kappel
Sakaryaspor	(Bulgaria) Atanas Kabov	(Cameroon) Nicolas Nkoulou	(Democratic Republic of the Congo) Gaël Kakuta	(France) Nsana Simon	(France) Rayane Aabid	(Poland) Jakub Szumski	(Senegal) Mendy Mamadou	(Serbia) Ognjen Ožegović		(Brazil) Fernando Andrade (Burkina Faso) Abdel Zagré (Ivory Coast) Max Gradel (North Macedonia) Ennur Totre (Democratic Republic of the Congo) Dylan Saint-Louis (Venezuela) Yonathan Del Valle
Şanlıurfaspor	(Bosnia and Herzegovina) Amar Begić	(Ghana) Kwasi Wriedt	(Kyrgyzstan) Erzhan Tokotayev	(Malta) Zach Muscat	(Nigeria) Chukwuma Akabueze	(Nigeria) Uchenna Ogundu	(Senegal) Bouly Sambou	(Suriname) Leandro Kappel	(Togo) Philip Awuku	(Finland) Petteri Forsell (Gabon) Urie-Michel Mboula (Germany) Reagy Ofosu (Guinea) Guy-Michel Landel (Mali) Aly Mallé (Nigeria) Olarenwaju Kayode (North Macedonia) Stefan Ashkovski
Ümraniyespor	(Albania) Jurgen Bardhi	(Angola) Lucas João	(Benin) Cebio Soukou	(Bosnia and Herzegovina) Andrej Đokanović	(Croatia) Tomislav Glumac	(Germany) Engjëll Hoti	(Guadeloupe) Dimitri Cavaré	(Portugal) Benny		(Bulgaria) Georgi Minchev
Yeni Malatyaspor										

== League table ==
Pos	Team	Pld	W	D	L	GF	GA	GD	Pts	Promotion, qualification or relegation
1	Kocaelispor (C, P)	38	21	9	8	68	41	+27	72	Promotion to the Süper Lig
2	Gençlerbirliği (P)	38	19	11	8	57	34	+23	68	Promotion to the Süper Lig
3	Fatih Karagümrük (O, P)	38	19	9	10	55	36	+19	66	Qualification for the Süper Lig play-off final
4	İstanbulspor	38	20	4	14	67	38	+29	64 (Note: Head-to-head points: İstanbulspor 7, Bandırmaspor 7, Erzurumspor 3. Head-to-head goal difference: İstanbulspor +1, Bandırmaspor 0.)	Qualification for the Süper Lig play-off quarter-finals
5	Bandırmaspor	38	17	13	8	52	45	+7	64	Qualification for the Süper Lig play-off quarter-finals
6	Erzurumspor	38	19	7	12	53	31	+22	64	Qualification for the Süper Lig play-off quarter-finals
7	Boluspor	38	17	10	11	66	40	+26	61	Qualification for the Süper Lig play-off quarter-finals
8	Iğdır	38	16	10	12	57	33	+24	58	
9	Amedspor	38	14	15	9	43	35	+8	57	
10	Çorum	38	14	12	12	49	45	+4	54	
11	Ümraniyespor	38	14	11	13	48	42	+6	53	
12	Esenler Erokspor	38	13	13	12	53	50	+3	52	
13	Sakaryaspor	38	13	12	13	48	54	−6	51 (Note: Head-to-head points: Sakaryaspor 4, Keçiörengücü 1.)	
14	Keçiörengücü	38	14	9	15	60	53	+7	51	
15	Manisa	38	14	6	18	50	52	−2	48 (Note: Head-to-head points: Manisa 9, Pendikspor 7, Ankaragücü 1.)	
16	Pendikspor	38	13	9	16	45	51	−6	48	
17	Ankaragücü (R)	38	14	6	18	49	48	+1	48	Relegation to the TFF Second League
18	Şanlıurfaspor (R)	38	11	7	20	45	55	−10	40	Relegation to the TFF Second League
19	Adanaspor (R)	38	7	9	22	32	75	−43	30	Relegation to the TFF Second League
20	Yeni Malatyaspor (Note: Yeni Malatyaspor were deducted 3 points after forfeiting a match to Pendikspor.) (R)	38	0	0	38	14	153	−139	−21	Relegation to the TFF Second League

Source: TFF
Rules for classification: 1) Points; 2) Head-to-head points; 3) Head-to-head goal difference; 4) Head-to-head goals scored; 5) Goal difference; 6) Goals scored; 7) Play-off.
(Note: Head-to-head record is used only after all the matches between the teams in question have been played)
(C) Champions; (O) Play-off winners; (P) Promoted; (R) Relegated

== Results ==
Home \ Away	ADA	AME	ANK	BAN	BOL	ERZ	ESE	FKG	GEN	IĞD	KEÇ	KOC	MAN	PEN	SAK	YML	ÇOR	İST	ŞAN	ÜMR
Adanaspor	—	0–0	2–0	0–1	0–7	0–3	2–1	1–2	0–5	0–0	1–1	1–4	2–1	3–4	1–1	3–1	0–2	0–2	1–4	1–1
Amedspor	4–0	—	1–0	2–1	1–1	1–2	0–4	1–1	1–1	0–0	0–0	3–0	3–2	0–1	2–2	4–0	1–0	0–1	2–1	2–0
Ankaragücü	0–0	2–0	—	4–0	2–2	1–2	3–0	0–1	0–3	0–4	2–0	4–2	0–1	1–1	2–1	3–0	1–0	2–1	2–0	0–1
Bandırmaspor	1–0	0–1	2–0	—	2–0	3–2	1–0	1–0	2–2	1–1	1–2	2–2	2–3	2–1	3–2	2–0	0–0	1–0	3–2	2–0
Boluspor	3–1	0–0	2–3	0–0	—	0–0	2–1	1–0	0–2	0–1	1–1	1–3	2–0	1–2	3–1	10–1	2–0	1–0	1–0	3–0
Erzurumspor	1–0	2–0	1–0	2–0	1–0	—	2–0	1–3	1–2	0–0	4–0	1–1	1–0	2–4	0–0	3–0	1–1	1–2	0–1	2–0
Esenler Erokspor	1–0	1–1	3–1	1–1	1–1	1–2	—	2–1	1–2	3–1	2–2	3–1	1–1	4–0	1–1	2–1	2–2	0–3	1–1	0–1
Fatih Karagümrük	4–0	0–0	3–2	1–2	2–2	1–0	1–0	—	0–0	2–1	1–0	1–1	0–2	0–2	4–0	6–1	1–0	1–0	1–1	1–0
Gençlerbirliği	0–2	1–1	1–0	1–1	1–1	1–0	1–1	1–0	—	2–0	0–1	1–0	3–0	3–0	1–0	3–0	1–2	2–1	1–0	2–1
Iğdır	6–1	1–1	1–0	0–1	0–1	1–2	1–2	0–1	0–0	—	3–0	4–0	1–0	1–0	4–0	3–0	1–0	3–0	2–2	0–0
Keçiörengücü	3–0	1–2	2–3	1–2	1–1	1–3	2–2	0–1	3–3	2–0	—	0–1	4–0	1–1	2–3	7–0	2–3	2–1	4–1	0–1
Kocaelispor	2–0	1–0	1–1	2–2	3–4	1–0	0–2	2–1	2–1	3–0	4–1	—	1–2	3–0	3–1	7–1	2–0	1–1	0–0	1–0
Manisa	0–0	2–2	2–1	1–1	0–2	2–0	0–1	2–2	1–0	0–1	1–2	0–2	—	2–0	2–2	5–1	0–1	0–1	2–1	0–3
Pendikspor	1–0	0–1	2–1	1–1	1–0	0–0	2–2	2–0	0–1	0–2	0–2	1–2	1–0	—	3–0	4–0	2–2	1–1	0–2	2–2
Sakaryaspor	2–1	0–0	2–2	2–2	2–1	1–0	2–0	1–3	0–0	2–1	1–1	0–1	1–2	1–0	—	5–0	2–1	3–1	2–0	1–3
Yeni Malatyaspor	0–4	2–4	0–3	1–3	2–4	0–7	0–1	0–2	0–5	0–9	0–1	1–3	0–6	0–3 (Note: Yeni Malatyaspor team did not take the field. After decision, which was made by the Turkish Football Federation (TFF), the match was cancelled, and Yeni has been deemed to have been defeated by 0–3.)	0–2	—	0–4	1–4	1–4	0–5
Çorum	1–1	1–1	1–1	4–0	0–2	0–1	3–3	2–2	1–0	0–0	3–2	0–2	3–2	1–0	1–1	2–0	—	3–1	2–1	3–1
İstanbulspor	0–0	1–0	1–0	0–0	1–2	3–2	4–0	2–0	5–0	4–0	0–2	0–3	3–2	5–2	3–0	5–0	3–0	—	3–0	3–0
Şanlıurfaspor	1–2	0–1	0–1	3–2	3–2	0–1	0–2	1–3	3–1	3–3	0–2	0–0	1–3	2–1	0–1	3–0	0–0	1–0	—	3–1
Ümraniyespor	5–2	3–0	2–1	1–1	1–0	0–0	1–1	2–2	3–3	0–1	1–2	1–1	0–1	0–0	0–0	2–0	3–0	2–1	1–0	—

Updated to match(es) played on 11 May 2025. Source: TFF
Legend: Blue = home team win; Yellow = draw; Red = away team win.

== Süper Lig play-off ==
=== Bracket ===
Quarter-finals
4	İstanbulspor	1
7	Boluspor	2
5	Bandırmaspor	2
6	Erzurumspor	0

Semi-finals
5	Bandırmaspor	4	1	5
7	Boluspor	1	0	1

Final
3	Fatih Karagümrük	3
5	Bandırmaspor	1

=== Quarter-finals ===
Team 1	Score	Team 2
Bandırmaspor	2–0	Erzurumspor
İstanbulspor	1–2	Boluspor

=== Semi-finals ===
Team 1	Agg.	Team 2	1st leg	2nd leg
Boluspor	1–5	Bandırmaspor	1–4	0–1

=== Final ===
Team 1	Score	Team 2
Fatih Karagümrük	3–1	Bandırmaspor
