= Anıl Demir =

Turkish association football player

Personal information
- Date of birth: 4 November 1996 (age 30)
- Place of birth: Pendik, Turkey
- Height: 1.90 m (6 ft 3 in)
- Position: Goalkeeper

Team information
- Current team: İnegöl Kafkasspor
- Number: 23

Youth career
- 2005–2008: Pendikspor
- 2008–2009: Fenerbahçe
- 2009–2010: Pendikspor
- 2010–2013: Fenerbahçe

Senior career*
Years	Team	Apps	(Gls)
2013–2018	Fenerbahçe	0	(0)
2017–2018	→ Tarsus İdman Yurdu (loan)	16	(0)
2018–2021	Tarsus İdman Yurdu	46	(0)
2021–2023	Ümraniyespor	2	(0)
2023–2025	Fethiyespor	16	(0)
2025–2026	Kırklarelispor	15	(0)
2026–	İnegöl Kafkasspor	0	(0)

International career^{‡}
2010–2011	Turkey U15	2	(0)
2011–2012	Turkey U16	6	(0)
2012	Turkey U17	1	(0)
2013–2014	Turkey U18	6	(0)
- * Club domestic league appearances and goals as of 1 October 2026 ‡ National team caps and goals as of 08:45, 2 February 2023 (UTC)

Anıl Demir (born 4 November 1996) is a Turkish footballer who plays as a goalkeeper for TFF 2. Lig club İnegöl Kafkasspor.

== Professional career ==
Demir is a youth product of Pendikspor and Fenerbahçe. He signed a professional contract with Fenerbahçe in 2013, and was assigned to their youth teams. He joined Tarsus İdman Yurdu on loan for the 2017–18 season in the TFF Third League, and helped the team earn promotion. He permanently transferred to Tarsus İdman Yurdu when his loan ended in 2018. On 1 July 2021, he transferred to TFF First League club Ümraniyespor, acting as backup goalkeeper. He helped the club earn promotion into the Süper Lig for the 2022–23 season. He made his professional debut with Ümraniyespor in a 5–2 Süper Lig loss to Beşiktaş on 30 October 2022.

== International career ==
Demir was born in Turkey and is of Serbian descent. He is a youth international for Turkey, having played up to the Turkey U18s. In March 2015 he received an offer to represent Serbia internationally.
