= Cihan Topaloğlu =

Turkish footballer

Personal information
- Date of birth: 30 May 1992 (age 34)
- Place of birth: İzmir, Turkey
- Height: 1.86 m (6 ft 1 in)
- Position: Goalkeeper

Team information
- Current team: Ümraniyespor
- Number: 35

Youth career
- 2004–2006: Bozdoğan Belediyespor
- 2006–2008: Balçovaspor
- 2008–2009: Altınordu

Senior career*
Years	Team	Apps	(Gls)
2009–2012	Altınordu	2	(0)
2012–2013	Bozyaka Yeşiltepespor	12	(0)
2013–2014	Gümüşordu	12	(0)
2014–2017	Altınordu	2	(0)
2015	→ Bucaspor 1928 (loan)	11	(0)
2015–2016	→ Manisa (loan)	10	(0)
2016–2017	→ Silivrispor (loan)	36	(1)
2017–2019	Çaykur Rizespor	2	(0)
2019–2022	Altay	46	(0)
2022–2024	Sakaryaspor	55	(0)
2024–	Ümraniyespor	71	(0)
- * Club domestic league appearances and goals as of 6 May 2026

Cihan Topaloğlu (born 30 March 1992) is a Turkish footballer who plays as a goalkeeper for Ümraniyespor.

== Career ==
A youth product of Bozdoğan Belediyespor, Balçovaspor, and Altınordu, Topaloğlu signed his first professional contract with Altınordu in 2009. He made his senior debut with them in a 2–0 TFF Third League win over Muğlaspor on 25 April 2010. Usually Altay's reserve goalkeepers, played amateur football from 2012 to 2014 before returning to Altay where he went on successive loans to Bucaspor 1928, Manisa FK and Silivrispor. He transferred to Çaykur Rizespor in 2017, and helped them win the 2017–18 TFF First League. He joined Altay in 2019, and helped them get promoted into the Süper Lig in 2021. He made his professional debut with Altay in a 1–0 Turkish Cup loss to Beşiktaş on 30 December 2021.

== Honours ==
Çaykur Rizespor

- TFF First League: 2017–18
