= Isaac Sackey =

Ghanaian footballer

Personal information
- Date of birth: 4 April 1994 (age 32)
- Place of birth: Tema, Ghana
- Height: 1.90 m (6 ft 3 in)
- Position: Defensive midfielder

Team information
- Current team: Al-Batin
- Number: 76

Youth career
- Liberty Professionals

Senior career*
| Years | Team | Apps | (Gls) |
| 2010–2012 | Liberty Professionals | 41 | (5) |
| 2012–2016 | Slovan Liberec | 60 | (4) |
| 2016–2020 | Alanyaspor | 69 | (2) |
| 2019–2020 | → Denizlispor (loan) | 20 | (0) |
| 2020–2022 | Hatayspor | 54 | (0) |
| 2022–2023 | Ümraniyespor | 30 | (0) |
| 2023– | Al-Batin | 0 | (0) |

International career^{‡}
- Ghana U-23
| 2017– | Ghana | 4 | (0) |
- * Club domestic league appearances and goals as of 9 October 2022 ‡ National team caps and goals as of 30 August 2013

Isaac Sackey (born 4 April 1994) is a Ghanaian footballer who plays as a midfielder for Saudi Arabian club Al-Batin.

== Career ==
Born in Berekum, Sackey began his career at Liberty Professionals.

On 21 September 2012, he left Liberty Professionals, signing a contract with FC Slovan Liberec.

On 8 August 2016, he signed with Alanyaspor of the Turkish Süper Lig.

On 20 July 2022, Sackey signed a one-year deal with an option to extend with Ümraniyespor.

On 1 August 2023, Sackey joined Al-Batin.
