= Mert Yılmaz =

German-born Turkish footballer

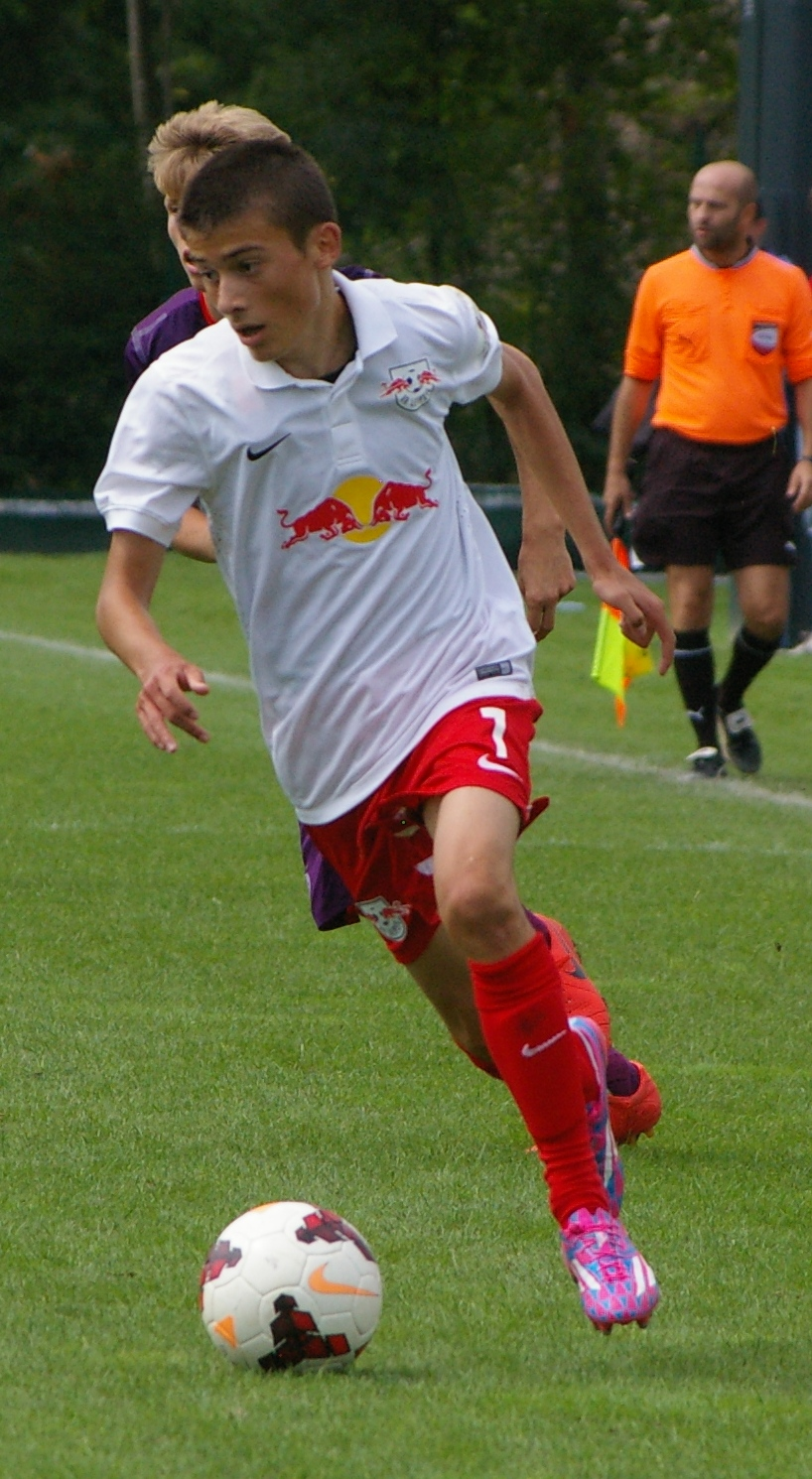
- Mert Yilmaz playing for RB Leipzig in 2014.

Personal information
- Full name: Mert Yılmaz
- Date of birth: 8 March 1999 (age 27)
- Place of birth: Berlin, Germany
- Height: 1.74 m (5 ft 9 in)
- Position: Defender

Team information
- Current team: Antalyaspor
- Number: 27

Youth career
- Nordberliner SC
- –2014: Tennis Borussia Berlin
- 2014–2018: RB Leipzig

Senior career*
Years	Team	Apps	(Gls)
2017–2018	RB Leipzig II	1	(0)
2018–2020	Bayern Munich II	44	(1)
2020–	Antalyaspor	39	(1)
2021–2022	→ Bursaspor (loan)	23	(0)
2022–2023	→ Ümraniyespor (loan)	3	(0)
2025–2026	→ Bodrum (loan)	22	(0)

International career^{‡}
2018	Turkey U19	7	(0)
2018–2019	Turkey U21	4	(0)
- * Club domestic league appearances and goals as of 18 October 2026 ‡ National team caps and goals as of 15:44, 11 December 2019 (UTC)

Mert Yılmaz (born 8 March 1999) is a professional footballer who plays as a defender for TFF 1. Lig club Antalyaspor. Born in Germany, Yılmaz represents Turkey internationally.

== Club career ==
On 20 July 2022, Yılmaz joined Ümraniyespor on a season-long loan with an option to buy.

== Career statistics ==
As of 11 December 2019

Club	Season	League			Cup		Continental		Other		Total	
Club	Season	Division	Apps	Goals	Apps	Goals	Apps	Goals	Apps	Goals	Apps	Goals
RB Leipzig II	2016–17	Regionalliga	1	0	0	0	–		0	0	1	0
Bayern Munich II	2018–19	Regionalliga	27	1	0	0	0	0	0	0	27	1
Bayern Munich II	2019–20	3. Liga	4	0	0	0	0	0	0	0	4	0
Bayern Munich II	Total		31	1	0	0	0	0	0	0	31	1
Career total			32	1	0	0	0	0	0	0	32	1
