= Emre Nefiz =

Turkish footballer

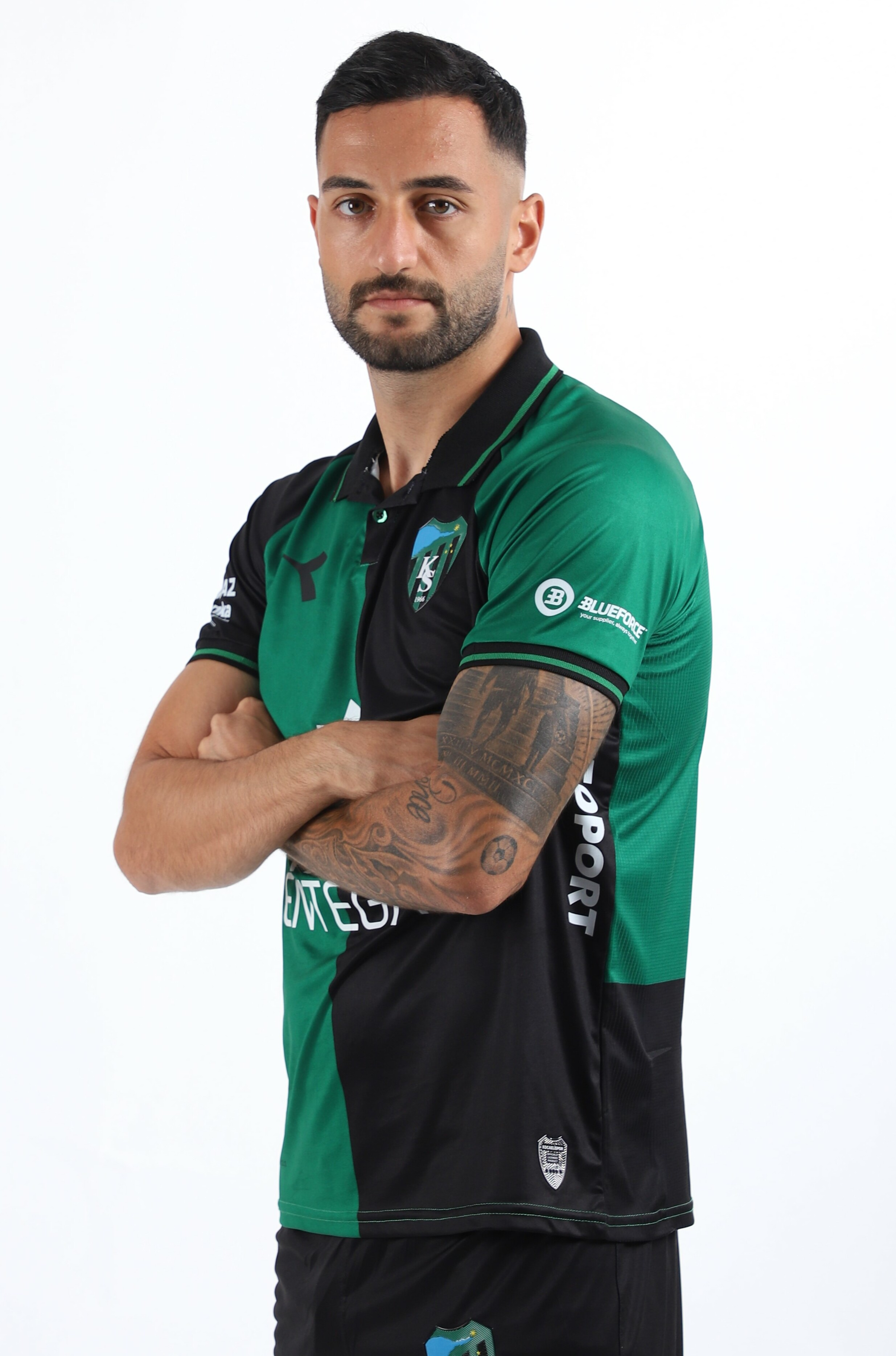

Personal information
- Date of birth: 24 November 1994 (age 31)
- Place of birth: Frankfurt, Germany
- Height: 1.78 m (5 ft 10 in)
- Position: Winger

Youth career
- 2000–2001: VfL Germania 94 Frankfurt
- 2001–2008: Eintracht Frankfurt
- 2008–2012: FSV Frankfurt

Senior career*
Years	Team	Apps	(Gls)
2012–2014	FSV Frankfurt II	24	(11)
2012–2014	FSV Frankfurt	3	(0)
2014–2017	Gaziantepspor	36	(1)
2017–2018	Alanyaspor	20	(0)
2018–2020	Adana Demirspor	21	(1)
2019	→ Giresunspor (loan)	7	(0)
2020–2021	Altınordu	12	(0)
2022–2023	Ümraniyespor	24	(0)
2023–2024	Kocaelispor	15	(1)
2024–2025	Bucaspor 1928	36	(1)
2026	Serikspor	9	(0)

International career
2012–2013	Turkey U19	9	(2)
- * Club domestic league appearances and goals as of 7 May 2026

Emre Nefiz (born 24 November 1994) is a German footballer who plays as a winger.

Nefiz was born in Germany to parents of Turkish descent, and has represented the Turkey national under-19 football team.
