= Onur Atasayar =

Turkish association football player

Personal information
- Date of birth: 1 January 1995 (age 31)
- Place of birth: Tavşanlı, Turkey
- Height: 1.84 m (6 ft 0 in)
- Position: Left-back

Team information
- Current team: Ankaraspor
- Number: 33

Youth career
- 2005–2008: Gölbaşı Belediye Spor
- 2008–2013: Ankaragücü

Senior career*
Years	Team	Apps	(Gls)
2013–2017	Ankaragücü	65	(4)
2017–2022	Bursaspor	86	(5)
2022–2023	Ümraniyespor	18	(0)
2023–2024	Kocaelispor	4	(0)
2024–2025	Boluspor	2	(0)
2025–2026	Fethiyespor	18	(0)
2026–	Ankaraspor	1	(0)

International career^{‡}
2014	Turkey U19	1	(0)
2015	Turkey U20	2	(0)
- * Club domestic league appearances and goals as of 1 October 2026 ‡ National team caps and goals as of 10 June 2017

Onur Atasayar (born 1 January 1995) is a Turkish footballer who plays as a left-back for TFF 2. Lig club Ankaraspor.

== Professional career ==
Onur made his footballing debut in the TFF First League for Ankaragücü in a 1–0 loss to İstanbul Güngörenspor on 8 September 2013. Onur transferred to Bursaspor in January 2017, making his professional debut on 17 February 2017. On 20 July 2022 after 5 seasons with Bursaspor, he transferred to Ümraniyespor signing a 1+1 year contract.

== International career ==
Onur is a youth international for the Turkey, having played for the Turkey U19s and U20s.
