= Urie-Michel Mboula =

Gabonese footballer (born 2003

Personal information
- Date of birth: 30 April 2003 (age 23)
- Place of birth: Gabon
- Height: 1.85 m (6 ft 1 in)
- Position: Defender

Team information
- Current team: Metz
- Number: 4

Senior career*
Years	Team	Apps	(Gls)
2022–2023	Dinamo-Auto	22	(4)
2023–2025	Şanlıurfaspor	33	(2)
2025	→ Metz (loan)	10	(0)
2025–	Metz	17	(0)

International career^{‡}
2023	Gabon U23	3	(0)
2024–	Gabon	13	(0)
- * Club domestic league appearances and goals as of 15 September 2026 ‡ National team caps and goals as of 29 September 2026

Urie-Michel Mboula (born 30 April 2003) is a Gabonese professional footballer who plays as a defender for Ligue 2 club Metz and the Gabon national team.

== Club career ==
In 2022, Mboula signed for Moldovan side Dinamo-Auto, where he made eleven league appearances and scored four goals. Ahead of the 2023–24 season, he signed for Turkish side Şanlıurfaspor, where he made thirty-three league appearances and scored two goals. Subsequently, he signed for French side Metz in 2025, helping the club achieve promotion from the second tier to the top flight.

== International career ==
Mboula is a Gabon international. During September, October, and November 2024, he played for the Gabon national football team for 2025 Africa Cup of Nations qualification.

== Style of play ==
Mboula plays as a defender and is left-footed. Gabonese news website Gabonreview wrote in 2025 that "he demonstrated his ability to pass the ball and his physical impact... the 1m88 player has all the qualities to impose himself: solid in duels, quick in anticipation, and capable of ensuring a clean clearance".

== Career statistics ==
=== Club ===
As of match played 15 September 2026

Appearances and goals by club, season and competition
Club	Season	League			Cup		Other		Total	
Club	Season	Division	Apps	Goals	Apps	Goals	Apps	Goals	Apps	Goals
Dinamo-Auto	2022–23	Moldovan Liga	22	4	1	0	—		23	4
Şanlıurfaspor	2023–24	TFF 1. Lig	17	1	1	0	—		18	1
Şanlıurfaspor	2024–25	TFF 1. Lig	16	1	0	0	—		16	1
Şanlıurfaspor	Total		33	2	1	0	—		34	2
Metz (loan)	2024–25	Ligue 2	10	0	0	0	3 (Note: Appearances in Ligue 1 relegation/promotion play-offs)	0	13	0
Metz	2025–26	Ligue 1	14	0	2	0	0	0	16	0
Metz	2026–27	Ligue 2	3	0	0	0	—		3	0
Metz	Total		17	0	2	0	0	0	19	0
Career total			82	6	4	0	3	0	89	6

=== International ===
As of match played 29 September 2026

Appearances and goals by national team and year
National team	Year	Apps	Goals
Gabon	2024	6	0
Gabon	2025	3	0
Gabon	2026	4	0
Total		13	0
