= Valentin Gheorghe =

Romanian footballer (born 1997)

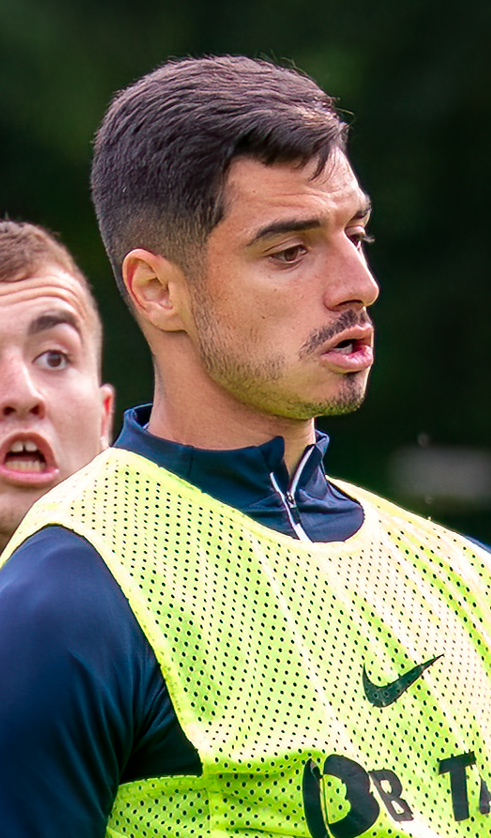
- Gheorghe training with FCSB in 2023

Personal information
- Date of birth: 14 February 1997 (age 29)
- Place of birth: Ploiești, Romania
- Height: 1.75 m (5 ft 9 in)
- Position: Winger

Youth career
- –2015: Astra Giurgiu

Senior career*
Years	Team	Apps	(Gls)
2015–2021	Astra Giurgiu	108	(20)
2015–2016	→ Afumați (loan)		
2021–2023	FCSB	29	(6)
2022–2023	→ Ümraniyespor (loan)	24	(1)
2023–2024	Universitatea Cluj	26	(2)
2024–2025	Politehnica Iași	21	(0)
2025–2026	Petrolul Ploiești	40	(2)

International career
2019	Romania U21	1	(0)
2021	Romania Olympic	3	(0)
- * Club domestic league appearances and goals as of 18 May 2026

Valentin Gheorghe (Romanian pronunciation: [valenˈtin ˈɡe̯orɡe]; born 14 February 1997) is a Romanian professional footballer who plays as a winger.

A product of Astra Giurgiu, Gheorghe had a loan spell at Afumați before going on to amass over 100 matches in the top flight for his boyhood club. Following Astra's relegation in 2021, he transferred back to the Liga I with FCSB.

Internationally, Gheorghe was capped once for Romania at under-21 level and represented the under-23 team in the 2020 Summer Olympics.

== Club career ==
=== Early career and Astra Giurgiu ===
Gheorghe spent his formative years in the academy of Astra Ploiești, which in 2012 relocated its first-team squad to the city of Giurgiu. He made his senior debut with the reserves in the lower leagues, and for the 2015–16 campaign was loaned out to Liga III side Afumați. Upon his return to Astra, he was promoted to the first team and recorded his professional debut at age 19, in a goalless Liga I draw with Pandurii Târgu Jiu on 31 July 2016.

On 27 October 2016, Gheorghe scored his first Astra goal in a 0–1 victory over NMM Becicherecu Mic in the Cupa României. He made his European debut on 27 July 2017, in a 0–0 draw with Oleksandriya in the third qualifying round of the UEFA Europa League. Gheorghe imposed himself as a regular in the 2018–19 season, totalling six goals from 31 appearances in all competitions.

The following campaign, Gheorghe netted ten times to become Astra's second-best goalscorer in the league behind Denis Alibec. He was a starter in the 2019 and 2021 Cupa României finals lost 1–2 to Viitorul Constanța and 2–3 to Universitatea Craiova, respectively, with the Ilie Oană Stadium in his native Ploiești hosting both. Gheorghe was named man of the match in the latter game, the last of a season which ended in relegation for Astra.

=== FCSB ===
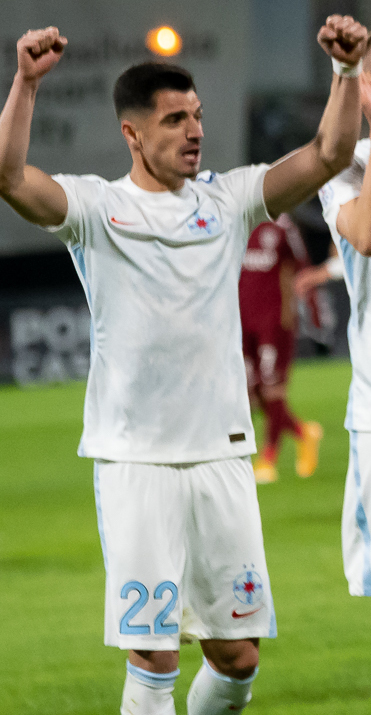
Gheorghe celebrating with FCSB after a win against CFR Cluj, April 2022

On 3 September 2021, Gheorghe returned to the Liga I by signing a five-year contract with FCSB. Nine days later, he scored on debut in a 6–0 derby thrashing of Dinamo București at the Arena Națională.

Mostly used a second-half substitute, Gheorghe totalled seven goals from 29 appearances in all competitions during his first year in Bucharest.

==== Loan to Ümraniyespor ====
Gheorghe agreed to a one-season loan deal with Turkish club Ümraniyespor on 29 June 2022. In the Süper Lig opener against Fenerbahçe on 8 August, he replaced Yonathan Del Valle in the 64th minute and netted a goal for an eventual 3–3 draw.

=== Universitatea Cluj ===
On 31 August 2022, Gheorghe agreed to a deal for an undisclosed period with Liga I side Universitatea Cluj.

== International career ==
In June 2021, Gheorghe was selected by manager Mirel Rădoi in Romania's squad for the postponed 2020 Summer Olympics. He started in the opening 1–0 win over Honduras and entered as a substitute in the other two matches of an eventual group-stage exit.

On 3 March 2023, Gheorghe received a preliminary call-up to the Romania senior team for the UEFA Euro 2024 qualification matches against Andorra and Belarus, but did not make the final list.

== Career statistics ==
As of match played 18 May 2026

Appearances and goals by club, season and competition
Club	Season	League			National cup (Note: Includes Cupa României, Turkish Cup)		League cup		Continental		Other		Total	
Club	Season	Division	Apps	Goals	Apps	Goals	Apps	Goals	Apps	Goals	Apps	Goals	Apps	Goals
Astra Giurgiu	2016–17	Liga I	2	0	1	1	0	0	0	0	0	0	3	1
Astra Giurgiu	2017–18	Liga I	12	0	2	1	—		1 (Note: Appearance in UEFA Europa League)	0	—		15	1
Astra Giurgiu	2018–19	Liga I	25	2	6	4	—		—		—		31	6
Astra Giurgiu	2019–20	Liga I	31	10	1	1	—		—		—		32	11
Astra Giurgiu	2020–21	Liga I	35	8	5	1	—		—		—		40	9
Astra Giurgiu	2021–22	Liga II	3	0	—		—		—		—		3	0
Astra Giurgiu	Total		108	20	15	8	0	0	1	0	0	0	124	28
FCSB	2021–22	Liga I	28	6	1	1	—		—		—		29	7
FCSB	2023–24	Liga I	1	0	0	0	—		1 (Note: Appearance in UEFA Europa Conference League)	0	—		2	0
FCSB	Total		29	6	1	1	—		1	0	—		31	7
Ümraniyespor (loan)	2022–23	Süper Lig	24	1	2	1	—		—		—		26	2
Universitatea Cluj	2023–24	Liga I	26	2	5	0	—		—		2 (Note: Appearance in Liga I European play-offs)	0	33	2
Politehnica Iași	2024–25	Liga I	21	0	4	0	—		—		—		25	0
Petrolul Ploiești	2024–25	Liga I	16	1	—		—		—		—		16	1
Petrolul Ploiești	2025–26	Liga I	24	1	1	0	—		—		—		25	1
Petrolul Ploiești	Total		40	2	1	0	—		—		—		41	2
Career total			248	31	28	10	0	0	2	0	2	0	280	41

== Honours ==
Afumați

- Liga III: 2015–16

Astra Giurgiu

- Cupa României runner-up: 2016–17, 2018–19, 2020–21
- Supercupa României: 2016

FCSB

- Liga I: 2023–24
