= Serkan Göksu =

Turkish association football player

Personal information
- Full name: Serkan Göksu
- Date of birth: 19 May 1993 (age 33)
- Place of birth: Istanbul, Turkey
- Height: 1.82 m (6 ft 0 in)
- Position: Midfielder

Team information
- Current team: Ümraniyespor
- Number: 8

Youth career
- 2006–2007: Galatasaray
- 2007–2019: Batı Trakyaspor
- 2009–2012: Galatasaray

Senior career*
Years	Team	Apps	(Gls)
2012–2014	Galatasaray	0	(0)
2012–2013	→Bayrampaşaspor (loan)	17	(1)
2013–2014	→Yeni Malatyaspor (loan)	31	(0)
2014–2018	Altınordu	111	(2)
2018–	Ümraniyespor	246	(11)
- * Club domestic league appearances and goals as of 6 May 2026

Serkan Göksu (born 19 May 1993) is a Turkish footballer who plays as a midfielder for Ümraniyespor.

== Professional career ==
A youth product of Galatasaray and Batı Trakyaspor, Göksu signed his first professional contract with Galatasaray in 2013 and immediately went on loan with Bayrampaşaspor in the TFF Second League. For the following season 2013-14, he went on loan to Yeni Malatyaspor. On 17 November 2014, he transferred to the TFF First League club Altınordu where he became captain and had over 100 appearances. On 26 May 2018, he transferred to Ümraniyespor. In the 2021-22 season, he helped Ümraniyespor come in 2nd in the TFF First League and earned promotion to the Süper Lig. He made his professional debut with Ümraniyespor in a 3–3 Süper Lig tie with Fenerbahçe on 8 August 2022.
