= Oğuz Gürbulak =

Turkish association football player

Personal information
- Date of birth: 10 August 1992 (age 34)
- Place of birth: Tercan, Turkey
- Height: 1.78 m (5 ft 10 in)
- Position: Midfielder

Team information
- Current team: Batman Petrolspor
- Number: 8

Youth career
- 2007–2010: 1922 Konyaspor

Senior career*
Years	Team	Apps	(Gls)
2010–2011	1922 Konyaspor	1	(0)
2011–2013	Sarayönü Belediyespor	40	(26)
2013–2015	Manavgatspor	59	(9)
2015–2017	1922 Konyaspor	59	(8)
2017–2021	Samsunspor	86	(5)
2021–2023	Ümraniyespor	62	(3)
2023–2025	Manisa	66	(13)
2025–2026	Çorum	32	(5)
2026–	Batman Petrolspor	8	(0)
- * Club domestic league appearances and goals as of 14 October 2026

Oğuz Gürbulak (born 10 August 1992) is a Turkish footballer who plays as a midfielder for TFF 1. Lig club Batman Petrolspor.

== Professional career ==
Gürbulak is a youth product of 1922 Konyaspor, and began his senior career with them in 2010. He was released by the club, and he ended up playing with the amateur side Sarayönü Belediyespor for 2 years. After a prolific spell in the amateurs scoring 26 goals, he moved to the semi-pro side Manavgatspor on 5 June 2013. He returned to 1922 Konyaspor in the summer of 2015. On 8 July 2017, he moved to Samsunspor on a 2-year contract. He helped Samsunspor earn promotion into the TFF First League for the 2019-20 season.

On 7 July 2021, Gürbulak transferred to Ümraniyespor signing a 2-year contract. He helped them earn promotion into the Süper Lig after coming in second for the 2021–22 TFF First League season. He made his professional debut with Ümraniyespor in a 3–3 Süper Lig tie with Fenerbahçe on 8 August 2022, where he assisted his sides second goal.

== Personal life ==
While playing with the amateur side Sarayönü Belediyespor, Gürbulak attained a degree in mechanical engineering from Selçuk University.
