= Umut Nayir =

Turkish footballer (born 1993)

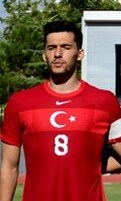
- Nayir in 2022

Personal information
- Full name: Mehmet Umut Nayir
- Date of birth: 28 June 1993 (age 33)
- Place of birth: Kocasinan, Turkey
- Height: 1.91 m (6 ft 3 in)
- Position: Striker

Team information
- Current team: Trabzonspor
- Number: 14

Youth career
- 2008–2011: Albayrak
- 2011–2012: Ankaragücü

Senior career*
Years	Team	Apps	(Gls)
2012–2014	Ankaragücü	69	(30)
2015–2018	Osmanlıspor	11	(2)
2016	→ Yeni Malatyaspor (loan)	16	(5)
2016–2017	→ Göztepe (loan)	28	(13)
2017–2018	→ Ankaragücü (loan)	29	(14)
2018–2021	Beşiktaş	19	(4)
2018–2019	→ Bursaspor (loan)	25	(4)
2020–2021	→ Hajduk Split (loan)	25	(6)
2021–2022	Giresunspor	32	(7)
2022–2023	Eyüpspor	0	(0)
2022–2023	→ Ümraniyespor (loan)	31	(17)
2023–2024	Fenerbahçe	6	(0)
2024	→ Pendikspor (loan)	17	(4)
2024–2026	Konyaspor	60	(16)
2026–	Trabzonspor	13	(1)

International career^{‡}
2022	Turkey U23	4	(0)
2023–	Turkey	5	(1)
Medal record
Men's football
Representing Turkey
Islamic Solidarity Games
Gold medal – first place	2021 Konya
- * Club domestic league appearances and goals as of 10 June 2026 ‡ National team caps and goals as of 22:39, 9 September 2024 (UTC)

Umut Nayir (born 28 June 1993) is a Turkish professional footballer who plays as a striker for Süper Lig club Trabzonspor and the Turkish national team.

== Career ==
Nayir is a youth product of Albayrak and Ankaragücü. In October 2012, he signed his first professional contract with Ankaragücü. On 30 January 2015, he transferred to Osmanlıspor in the Süper Lig. He made his professional debut for Osmanlıspor in a 1–1 Süper Lig tie with Kayserispor on 16 August 2015, scoring his side's only goal in his debut. On 16 June 2016, he moved to Yeni Malatyaspor on loan. Shortly after he joined Göztepe on loan for the 2016–17 season. He went on another loan the following season to Ankaragücü.

Nayir moved to Beşiktaş in July 2018. A few weeks after signing, he moved to Bursaspor on loan for the 2018–19 season. The following season, he returned to Beşiktaş where he started making appearances. For the 2020–21 season, he joined the Croatian club Hajduk Split on loan.

Nayir then transferred to Giresunspor in 2021, but was released at the end of the 2021–22 season after a public spat over wages. He transferred to Eyüpspor in the summer of 2022 on a 2-year contract, and immediately went out on loan with Ümraniyespor in the Süper Lig for the 2022–23 season. He completed the season with a record of 18 goals and 3 assists in 33 competitive matches.

On 11 July 2023, Nayir joined Fenerbahçe on a two-year contract. He made his debut with the team in a 3-0 UEFA Europa Conference League win over NK Maribor on 17 August 2023.

On 16 January 2024 Nayir was loaned to Süper Lig club Pendikspor until the end of the season

On 26 July 2024, Nayir transferred to Konyaspor with a 2-year agreement.

On 30 January 2026, Nayir transferred to Trabzonspor with a 1.5-year + 1-year (optional) agreement.

== International career ==
Nayir represented the Turkey U23s in their winning campaign at the 2021 Islamic Solidarity Games. He made his senior debut for Turkey on 25 March 2023 in a Euro 2024 qualifier against Armenia.

== Career statistics ==
=== Club ===
As of match played 4 February 2024

Appearances and goals by club, season and competition
Club	Season	League			Cup (Note: Includes Turkish Cup and Croatian Football Cup)		Europe		Total	
Club	Season	Division	Apps	Goals	Apps	Goals	Apps	Goals	Apps	Goals
Ankaragücü	2012–13	TFF First League	17	1	1	0	–		18	1
Ankaragücü	2013–14	TFF Second League	33	21	0	0	–		33	21
Ankaragücü	2014–15	TFF Second League	19	8	7	4	–		26	12
Ankaragücü	Total		69	30	8	4	0	0	77	34
Osmanlıspor	2014–15	TFF First League	2	1	0	0	–		2	1
Osmanlıspor	2015–16	Süper Lig	7	1	2	1	–		9	2
Osmanlıspor	2017–18	Süper Lig	2	0	0	0	–		2	0
Osmanlıspor	Total		11	2	2	1	0	0	13	3
Yeni Malatyaspor (loan)	2015–16	TFF First League	16	5	0	0	–		16	5
Göztepe (loan)	2016–17	TFF First League	28	13	7	5	–		35	18
Ankaragücü (loan)	2017–18	TFF First League	29	14	1	0	–		30	14
Beşiktaş	2019–20	Süper Lig	17	4	4	1	6 (Note: Appearances in UEFA Europa League)	1	27	6
Beşiktaş	2020–21	Süper Lig	2	0	0	0	1 (Note: Appearances in UEFA Champions League)	0	3	0
Beşiktaş	Total		19	4	4	1	7	1	30	6
Bursaspor (loan)	2018–19	Süper Lig	25	4	1	1	–		26	5
Hajduk Split (loan)	2020–21	Croatian Football League	25	6	1	0	–		26	6
Giresunspor	2021–22	Süper Lig	32	7	2	2	–		34	9
Ümraniyespor (loan)	2022–23	Süper Lig	31	17	2	1	–		33	18
Fenerbahçe	2023-24	Süper Lig	6	0	0	0	7 (Note: Appearances in UEFA Europa Conference League)	0	13	0
Pendikspor (loan)	2023–24	Süper Lig	4	3	1	1	–		5	4
Career total			295	105	29	16	14	1	338	122

=== International ===
As of match played 9 September 2024

Appearances and goals by national team and year
National team	Year	Apps	Goals
Turkey	2023	4	1
Turkey	2024	1	0
Total		5	1

List of international goals scored by Umut Nayir
No.	Date	Venue	Cap	Opponent	Score	Result	Competition
1	19 June 2023	Samsun Stadium, Samsun, Turkey	4	Wales	1–0	2–0	UEFA Euro 2024 qualifying

== Personal life ==
Outside of football, Nayir graduated with a law degree from the Ankara University, Law School. He married his wife Enfal Diner, a fanatic Fenerbahçe fan, in September 2021.

== Honours ==
Trabzonspor

- Turkish Cup: 2025–26

Turkey U23

- Islamic Solidarity Games: 2021
