= Orkun Özdemir =

Turkish footballer (born 1995)

Personal information
- Date of birth: 23 April 1995 (age 31)
- Place of birth: Akyaka, Turkey
- Height: 1.95 m (6 ft 5 in)
- Position: Goalkeeper

Team information
- Current team: Boluspor
- Number: 13

Youth career
- 2005–2008: Damlaspor
- 2008–2008: Beşiktaş
- 2009–2010: Dikilitaşspor
- 2010–2013: Beşiktaş
- 2013–2014: İstanbul Başakşehir

Senior career*
Years	Team	Apps	(Gls)
2014–2015	Fatih Karagümrük	0	(0)
2015–2016	Büyükçekmece Belediyespor	6	(0)
2016–2017	Ladik Belediyespor	18	(0)
2017–2018	Altinova Belediyespor	24	(0)
2018–2020	Serik Belediyespor	43	(0)
2020–2023	Ümraniyespor	27	(0)
2023–2025	Gençlerbirliği	14	(0)
2025	Boluspor	12	(0)
2026–	Boluspor	0	(0)
- * Club domestic league appearances and goals as of 18 October 2026

Orkun Özdemir (born 23 April 1995) is a Turkish footballer who plays as a goalkeeper for TFF 1. Lig club Boluspor.

== Professional career ==
Özdemir is a youth product of Damlaspor, Beşiktaş, Dikilitaşspor, and İstanbul Başakşehir. He began his senior career as the backup goalkeeper with Fatih Karagümrük in the TFF Second League without making a senior appearance in the 2014–15 season. He spent 2015–16 with the amateur club Büyükçekmece Belediyespor, and in August 2016 transferred to Ladik Belediyespor. He also spent the 2017–18 season with the amateur club Altinova Belediyespor. He returned to professional football with Serik Belediyespor in the TFF Third League where he stayed 2 seasons. On 10 August 2020, he moved up 2 divisions to play with Ümraniyespor in the TFF First League. He helped the club achieve promotion to the Süper Lig for the 2022–23 season. He made his professional debut with Ümraniyespor in a 1–0 Süper Lig loss to Trabzonspor on 2 September 2022.

On 13 November 2025, Özdemir was banned from playing for 12 months for his involvement in the 2025 Turkish football betting scandal.
