= Antonio Mršić =

Croatian footballer

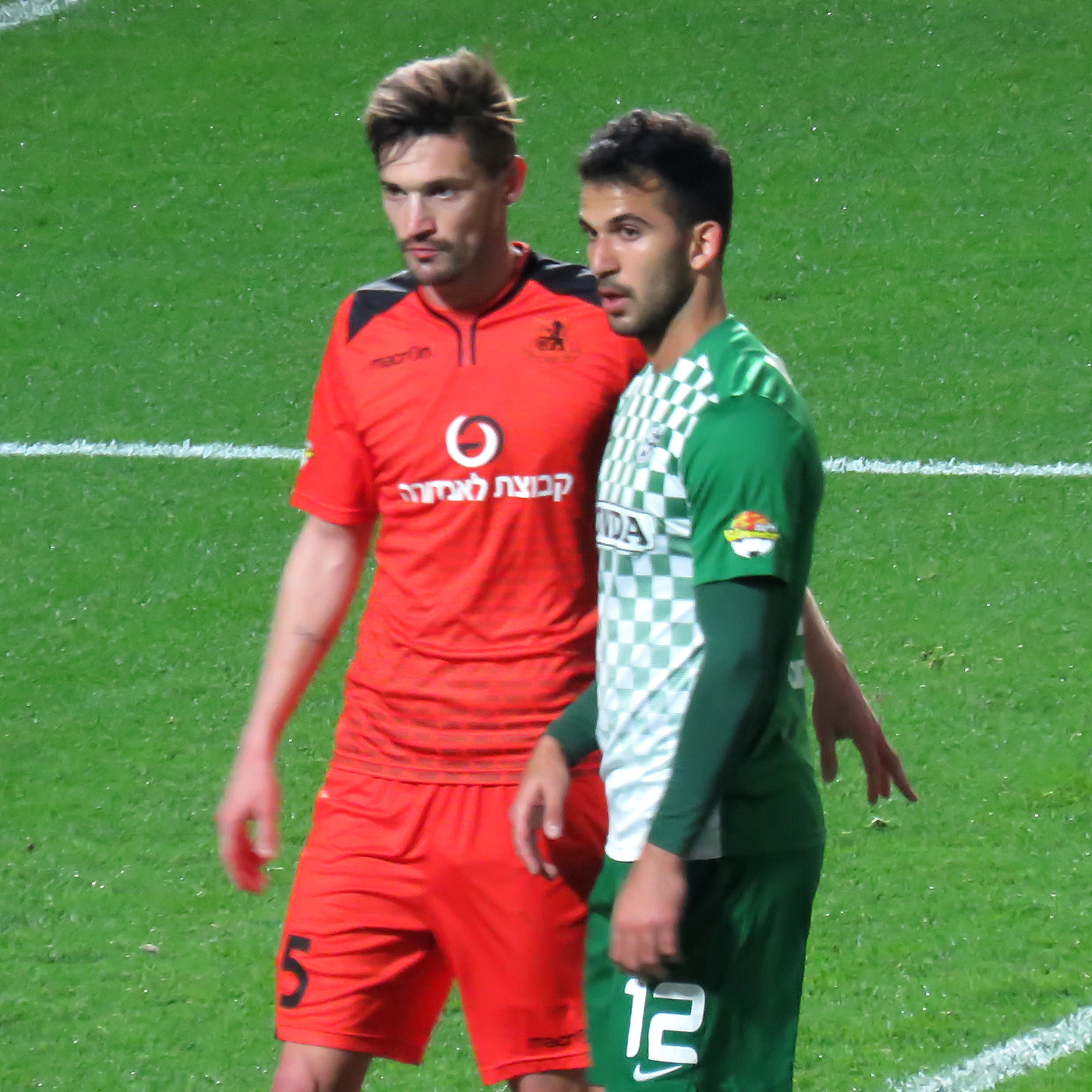
- Mršić (in orange) next to Orel Dgani

Personal information
- Date of birth: 5 June 1987 (age 39)
- Place of birth: Vinkovci, SFR Yugoslavia
- Height: 1.87 m (6 ft 1 1/2 in)
- Position: Midfielder

Team information
- Current team: Ümraniyespor
- Number: 39

Youth career
- 2000–2006: Zadar

Senior career*
Years	Team	Apps	(Gls)
2006–2007	Velebit Benkovac		
2007	Imotski	5	(0)
2007–2009	Primorac Biograd		
2009–2013	Zadar	101	(22)
2013–2016	RNK Split	51	(6)
2016–2018	Bnei Yehuda Tel Aviv	41	(2)
2018	→ Bnei Sakhnin (loan)	11	(0)
2018–2019	Hapoel Rishon LeZion	35	(1)
2019–2021	Balıkesirspor	47	(13)
2021–2023	Ümraniyespor	54	(14)
2023–	Eendracht Aalst		
- * Club domestic league appearances and goals as of 18 March 2023 (UTC)

Antonio Mršić (born 5 June 1987) is a Croatian professional footballer who currently plays as a midfielder for Belgian club Eendracht Aalst.

== Club career ==
Mršić went through the ranks of the NK Zadar academy, but, not breaking into the first team, despite scoring 30 goals in a season for their U-19 team, he played his first senior minutes for the nearby third-tier side NK Velebit from Benkovac. After his father, the well known coach Stanko Mršić, took over managerial duties at second-tier NK Imotski. He left the club, however, after 6 rounds, joining third-tier Primorac Biograd, where his father would join him later in the season. The young midfielder remained there for the following two seasons, before his games attracted the notice of NK Zadar, which he joined in the summer of 2009. He made his Prva HNL debut on 23 August 2008 in a goalless draw with Dinamo Zagreb. and quickly established himself as a first team regular, which he would remain for the following four seasons. Despite a trial at MŠK Žilina in the summer of 2012, and rumors linking him Dinamo Zagreb, he moved to RNK Split in the summer of 2013.

== Honours ==
=== Club ===
Bnei Yehuda

- Israel State Cup (1): 2016–17
