= Bülent Bölükbaşı =

Turkish footballer

Personal information
- Date of birth: 17 June 1976 (age 50)
- Place of birth: Adana, Turkey
- Height: 1.74 m (5 ft 8 1/2 in)
- Position: Midfielder

Team information
- Current team: Ümraniyespor (manager)

Senior career*
Years	Team	Apps	(Gls)
1995–1998	Adanaspor		
1998–1999	Hatayspor		
1999–2001	Konyaspor		
2001–2005	Gaziantepspor		
2001–2002	→ Diyarbakırspor (loan)		
2005–2007	Kayserispor		
2007–2008	Gaziantepspor		
2008–2009	Kocaelispor		
2009	Konyaspor		
2009	Ankaraspor		
2009–2010	Giresunspor		
2010–2012	Adanaspor		

International career
2004	Turkey	1	(0)

Managerial career
- 2012–2013: Adanaspor (youth)
- 2013–2014: Gaziantep FK (youth)
- 2015–2016: Gaziantep BB (assistant)
- 2016: Gaziantep BB
- 2017–2018: Al-Gharafa (assistant)
- 2019–2020: Kayserispor (sporting director)
- 2021: Çaykur Rizespor (assistant)
- 2022–2024: FC Sheriff (assistant)
- 2024–2025: Al-Okhdood (assistant)
- 2025: Ümraniyespor
- 2026: Sarıyer
- 2026–: Ümraniyespor
- * Club domestic league appearances and goals

Bülent Bölükbaşı (born 17 June 1976) is a Turkish football coach and former player who is the head coach of TFF 1. Lig Ümraniyespor.

== Career ==
He started and finished his professional career at the club of his place of birth; Adanaspor. He became a Turkey international footballer on 31 March 2004 against Croatia. That was his first and last international cap.

In 2012 he started his coaching career at Adanaspor taking the role of youth coach. In 2016 he took his first job as a manager at Gaziantep Büyükşehir Belediyespor. End 2019 he was given the role of Director of football at his former club Kayserispor, which he also captained as a player.
