= Kader Keïta (footballer, born 2000) =

Ivorian footballer

Personal information
- Full name: Abdul Kader Keïta
- Date of birth: 6 November 2000 (age 26)
- Place of birth: Ouragahio, Ivory Coast
- Height: 1.78 m (5 ft 10 in)
- Position: Defensive midfielder

Team information
- Current team: Al-Riyadh
- Number: 6

Youth career
- –2014: Paris FC
- 2014–2015: FC Montfermeil
- 2015–2017: Ajaccio
- 2017–2018: Lille

Senior career*
Years	Team	Apps	(Gls)
2016–2017	Ajaccio B	1	(0)
2017–2019	Lille B	23	(1)
2019–2022	Westerlo	50	(2)
2021–2022	→ Sion (loan)	6	(0)
2022–2024	Sivasspor	22	(0)
2024–2025	CFR Cluj	32	(1)
2025	→ Rapid București (loan)	8	(0)
2025–2026	Rapid București	33	(0)
2026–	Al-Riyadh	4	(1)

International career^{‡}
2021	Ivory Coast Olympic	3	(0)
2024–	Ivory Coast	1	(0)
- * Club domestic league appearances and goals as of 13 September 2026 ‡ National team caps and goals as of 26 March 2024

Abdul Kader Keïta (born 6 November 2000) is an Ivorian professional footballer who plays as a defensive midfielder for Saudi Pro League club Al-Riyadh.

== Club career ==
After playing for the reserve side of Ajaccio, Keïta joined Lille's reserve team in summer 2017. He joined Westerlo on a three-year contract in summer 2019. On 31 August 2021, Keïta joined Swiss Super League club Sion on a year-long loan with an option to buy. On 12 August 2022, Keïta signed a three-year contract with Sivasspor in Turkey. In January 2024, Keita was acquired by Romanian club CFR Cluj, for a reported fee of €120.000. In February 2025, Rapid Bucureşti managed to obtain the loan of Kader Keita from CFR Cluj until the end of the season, with an option to buy.

== International career ==
Keïta is a dual-citizen of France and the Ivory Coast. He was selected as part of the Ivory Coast Olympic squad for the 2020 Summer Olympics, and made 3 appearances at the Olympics.

== Career statistics ==
=== Club ===
As of match played 25 May 2026

Appearances and goals by club, season and competition
Club	Season	League			National cup (Note: Includes Belgian Cup, Swiss Cup, Turkish Cup, Cupa României)		Europe		Other		Total	
Club	Season	Division	Apps	Goals	Apps	Goals	Apps	Goals	Apps	Goals	Apps	Goals
Ajaccio B	2016–17	CFA 2	1	0	—		—		—		1	0
Lille B	2017–18	Championnat National 2	9	0	—		—		—		9	0
Lille B	2018–19	Championnat National 2	14	1	—		—		—		14	1
Lille B	Total		23	1	—		—		—		23	1
Westerlo	2019–20	Belgian First Division B	22	0	3	0	—		—		25	0
Westerlo	2020–21	Belgian First Division B	26	2	2	0	—		—		26	4
Westerlo	2021–22	Belgian First Division B	2	0	—		—		—		2	0
Westerlo	Total		50	2	5	0	—		—		55	2
Sion (loan)	2021–22	Swiss Super League	6	0	1	0	—		—		7	0
Sivasspor	2022–23	Süper Lig	15	0	2	0	5 (Note: Two appearances in UEFA Europa League, seven appearances in UEFA Conference League)	0	—		22	0
Sivasspor	2023–24	Süper Lig	7	0	2	0	—		—		9	0
Sivasspor	Total		22	0	4	0	5	0	—		31	0
CFR Cluj	2023–24	Liga I	19	1	1	0	—		—		20	1
CFR Cluj	2024–25	Liga I	13	0	2	0	6 (Note: Appearances in UEFA Conference League)	0	—		21	0
CFR Cluj	Total		32	1	3	0	6	0	—		41	1
Rapid București (loan)	2024–25	Liga I	8	0	2	0	—		—		10	0
Rapid București	2025–26	Liga I	33	0	1	0	—		—		34	0
Rapid București	Total		41	0	3	0	—		—		44	0
Al-Riyadh	2026–27	Saudi Pro League	1	0	0	0	—		—		1	0
Career total			176	4	16	0	11	0	—		203	4

=== International ===
As of match played 26 March 2024

Appearances and goals by national team and year
National team	Year	Apps	Goals
Ivory Coast
Ivory Coast	2024	1	0
Total		1	0
