= Mustafa Eser =

Turkish association football player

Personal information
- Date of birth: 29 August 2001 (age 25)
- Place of birth: Ümraniye, Turkey
- Height: 1.85 m (6 ft 1 in)
- Position: Centre-back

Team information
- Current team: Ümraniyespor
- Number: 4

Youth career
- 2013–2019: Ümraniyespor

Senior career*
| Years | Team | Apps | (Gls) |
| 2019– | Ümraniyespor | 70 | (2) |
- * Club domestic league appearances and goals as of 6 May 2026

Mustafa Eser (born 29 August 2001) is a Turkish footballer who plays as a centre-back for Ümraniyespor.

== Professional career ==
On 6 September 2019, Eser signed his first professional contract with Ümraniyespor. He helped the team achieve promotion into the Süper Lig for the 2022–23 season. He made his professional debut with Ümraniyespor in a 3–1 Süper Lig loss to Fatih Karagümrük on 22 October 2022.
