= Durel Avounou =

Congolese footballer (born 1997)

Personal information
- Full name: Bel Durel Avounou
- Date of birth: 25 September 1997 (age 29)
- Place of birth: Brazzaville, Republic of the Congo
- Height: 1.79 m (5 ft 10 in)
- Position: Midfielder

Team information
- Current team: Bnei Sakhnin

Youth career
- –2015: CESD La Djiri

Senior career*
| Years | Team | Apps | (Gls) |
| 2015–2020 | Caen B | 26 | (3) |
| 2017–2020 | Caen | 14 | (0) |
| 2018–2019 | → Orléans (loan) | 35 | (5) |
| 2020–2022 | Le Mans | 49 | (6) |
| 2022–2023 | Ümraniyespor | 27 | (5) |
| 2023–2024 | CFR Cluj | 29 | (3) |
| 2024–2025 | Çorum | 15 | (2) |
| 2025– | Bnei Sakhnin | 3 | (0) |

International career^{‡}
| 2015– | Congo | 23 | (0) |
- * Club domestic league appearances and goals as of 21:18, 6 November 2025 (UTC) ‡ National team caps and goals as of 23 March 2023

Bel Durel Avounou (born 25 September 1997) is a Congolese professional footballer who plays as midfielder for Israeli club Bnei Sakhnin and the Congo national football team.

== Club career ==
Born in Brazzaville, Avounou began his career with CESD La Djiri before signing a five-year contract with French team Caen in 2015. He made his senior debut on 5 August 2017 in the Ligue 1 first-round game at Montpellier. He spent the 2018–19 season on loan with Ligue 2 side Orléans.

At the end of his Caen contract, Avounou joined Le Mans, signing a one-year contract with the option of an additional year in June 2020.

On 10 June 2022, Avounou signed a one-year contract, with an option for a second year, with Ümraniyespor in Turkey.

In July 2023 he signed for Romanian club CFR Cluj. He left the club in July 2024.

In August 2024 he signed for TFF First League club Çorum.

== International career ==
He made his international debut for the Republic of Congo in 2015.

=== International stats ===
As of 23 March 2023

Appearances and goals by national team and year
| National team | Year | Apps | Goals |
|---|---|---|---|
| Congo | 2015 | 3 | 0 |
| Congo | 2016 | 2 | 0 |
| Congo | 2017 | 3 | 0 |
| Congo | 2018 | 1 | 0 |
| Congo | 2019 | 3 | 0 |
| Congo | 2020 | 3 | 0 |
| Congo | 2021 | 3 | 0 |
| Congo | 2022 | 4 | 0 |
| Congo | 2023 | 1 | 0 |
| Total | | 23 | 0 |
