= Tomislav Glumac =

Croatian footballer

Personal information
- Date of birth: 15 May 1991 (age 35)
- Place of birth: Dubrovnik, SR Croatia, Yugoslavia
- Height: 1.94 m (6 ft 4 1/2 in)
- Position: Defender

Team information
- Current team: Ümraniyespor
- Number: 44

Youth career
- GOŠK Dubrovnik
- 2006–2010: Hajduk Split

Senior career*
Years	Team	Apps	(Gls)
2010–2011	Hajduk Split	1	(0)
2010–2011	→ Zadar (loan)	35	(1)
2012–2015	RNK Split	64	(7)
2015–2019	Balıkesirspor	116	(4)
2020–	Ümraniyespor	200	(11)

International career^{‡}
2009	Croatia U18	7	(0)
2009–2010	Croatia U19	12	(0)
2010–2011	Croatia U20	4	(0)
2011	Croatia U21	1	(0)
- * Club domestic league appearances and goals as of 6 May 2026 ‡ National team caps and goals as of 5 September 2011

Tomislav Glumac (born 15 May 1991) is a Croatian footballer who currently plays as a defender for Turkish club Ümraniyespor.

== Club career ==
Glumac started his career playing at youth level for his hometown club GOŠK Dubrovnik. At the age of 15 he joined Hajduk Split where he eventually signed a professional five-year contract. In the second part of the 2009–10 season, he was loaned to Zadar to help the team avoid relegation. He was a first-team regular and played in 13 matches that season. He also remained at Zadar the following season and scored his first goal in Prva HNL in a 3–2 defeat to RNK Split. In the 2011–12 season, Glumac returned to Hajduk and made his debut for the first team on 21 October 2011 as a late substitute in the 3–0 win against Lučko. A month later, manager Krasimir Balakov announced that Glumac was no longer a part of the first team. On 9 January 2012, it was announced that Glumac was transferred to RNK Split in exchange for Goran Milović, signing a two-and-a-half-year contract.

== International career ==
Glumac was a part of the Croatian national under-19 team in the 2010 UEFA European Under-19 Football Championship held in France. Croatia reached semi-finals where they lost 2–1 to hosts but with this achievement they qualified for the 2011 FIFA U-20 World Cup. Glumac was selected in the 21-man squad by manager Ivica Grnja despite initial objection of Hajduk as they wanted to keep the defender in case of first-team injuries. Croatia finished in the last place in the group, losing all three matches to Saudi Arabia, Nigeria and Guatemala.
