= Ümraniye Municipality City Stadium =

Football stadium in Istanbul, Turkey

- Ümraniye Belediyesi Şehir Stadyumu
- Address: Hekimbaşı, Ümraniye, Istanbul
- Capacity: 3,513
- Surface: Grass
- Opened: 2000

Tenants
- Ümraniyespor

Ümraniye Municipality City Stadium (Turkish: Ümraniye Belediyesi Şehir Stadyumu) is a stadium with a capacity of 3,513 spectators located in Ümraniye district of Istanbul. It hosts the home matches of Süper Lig club Ümraniyespor.

After Ümraniyespor reached the Süper Lig, the stadium was upgraded to the Süper Lig standards.

It is also known as Ümraniye Hekimbaşı Şehir Stadyumu.
