= Ümraniyespor =

Turkish football club

- Full name: Ümraniyespor Kulübü
- Founded: 1938; 88 years ago
- Ground: Ümraniye Municipality City Stadium, Ümraniye, Istanbul
- Capacity: 3,425
- Coordinates: 41°03′32″N 29°06′34″E
- Chairman: Ömür Aydın
- Head coach: Bülent Bölükbaşı
- League: TFF 1. Lig
- 2025–26: TFF 1. Lig, 16th of 20
- Website: http://www.umraniyespor.com.tr/
Home colours	Away colours	Third colours

Ümraniyespor Kulübü is a Turkish professional football club located in Ümraniye, Istanbul.

The club has played in red-and-white kits since its formation in 1938.

== Stadium ==
Currently the team plays at the 3,513-capacity Ümraniye Belediyesi Şehir Stadium.

== Players ==
=== Current squad ===
As of 15 November 2026

Note: Flags indicate national team as defined under FIFA eligibility rules; some limited exceptions apply. Players may hold more than one non-FIFA nationality.

No.	Pos.	Nation	Player
4	DF	TUR	Mustafa Eser
6	MF	NGR	David Chisom Otugo
7	FW	FIN	Santeri Hostikka
8	MF	TUR	Serkan Göksu
9	FW	TUR	Melih Bostan (on loan from Konyaspor)
10	MF	BIH	Andrej Đokanović
11	FW	ESP	Álex Blanco
12	FW	NGR	Toheeb Adeola Kosoko
13	GK	TUR	Özgün Köklü
15	DF	TUR	Murat Alas
16	MF	TUR	Kerem Şen
17	MF	TUR	Berat Yılmaz (on loan from Galatasaray)
18	FW	TUR	Talha Özdemir
20	MF	TUR	Atalay Babacan
23	GK	TUR	Kerem Ersunar
26	DF	TUR	Batuhan Çakır
27	FW	BEN	Cebio Soukou

No.	Pos.	Nation	Player
28	MF	GER	Oğuzhan Aydoğan
30	MF	TUR	Yusuf Deniz Şaş
31	FW	TUR	Deniz Aksoy
35	GK	TUR	Cihan Topaloğlu
44	DF	CRO	Tomislav Glumac (captain)
51	DF	TUR	Yiğit Yasin Yüksel (on loan from Beşiktaş)
53	DF	TUR	Burak Öksüz
55	FW	GUI	Bengali-Fodé Koita
58	DF	TUR	Mustafa Kartal
59	DF	TUR	Yunus Emre Yılmaz
61	MF	TUR	Abdulkadir Parmak
66	DF	TUR	Ali Yaşar
70	DF	TUR	Oğuz Yıldırım
77	FW	TUR	Tunahan Taşçı (on loan from Konyaspor)
75	DF	TUR	Yağız Can
88	DF	TUR	Emre Gedik

=== Out on loan ===
Note: Flags indicate national team as defined under FIFA eligibility rules; some limited exceptions apply. Players may hold more than one non-FIFA nationality.

No.	Pos.	Nation	Player
—	GK	TUR	Onur Yıldırım (at Silivrispor until 30 June 2027)
—	DF	TUR	Emirhan Balarısı (at Ağrı 1970 until 30 June 2027)

No.	Pos.	Nation	Player
—	MF	TUR	Muhammet Fatih Karasu (at Fatsa Belediyespor until 30 June 2027)

== Staff ==
The France-born İbrahim Dağaşan is the sporting director at the club.

== Honours ==
- TFF First League
  - Runner-up: 2021–22
- TFF Second League
  - Winner: 2015–16
- TFF Third League
  - Winner: 2013–14
- Turkish Regional Amateur League
  - Winner: 2010–11

== League participations ==
- Süper Lig: 2022–2023
- TFF First League: 2016–2022, 2023-
- TFF Second League: 2014–2016
- TFF Third League: 1984–1987, 1990–1993, 1999–2000, 2011–2014
- Turkish Regional Amateur League: 1993–1995, 2010–2011
- Amatör Futbol Ligleri: 1938–1984, 1987–1990, 1995–1999, 2000–2010
