= 2019–20 Yeni Malatyaspor season =

Yeni Malatyaspor
2019–20 season
- Chairman: Adil Gevrek
- Manager: Hikmet Karaman
- Stadium: Malatya Arena
- Süper Lig: 17th
- Turkish Cup: Round of 16
- UEFA Europa League: Third qualifying round (vs. Partizan)
Home colours	Away colours	Third colours

The 2019–20 season was Yeni Malatyaspor's 34th year in existence. In addition to the domestic league, Yeni Malatyaspor participated in the Turkish Cup.

== Squad ==
As of 31 January 2020.

Note: Flags indicate national team as defined under FIFA eligibility rules; some limited exceptions apply. Players may hold more than one non-FIFA nationality.

No.	Pos.	Nation	Player
3	DF	TUR	Erkan Kaş
6	MF	GER	Robin Yalçın
7	MF	TUR	Gökhan Töre
8	MF	NED	Murat Yıldırım (Captain)
9	FW	TUR	Umut Bulut
11	FW	TUR	Eren Tozlu
12	GK	TUR	Murat Akşit
14	MF	TUR	Ahmed Ildiz
15	DF	TUR	Mustafa Akbaş
16	DF	ZIM	Teenage Hadebe
19	MF	GHA	Afriyie Acquah
20	MF	SUR	Mitchell Donald
21	MF	CIV	Moryké Fofana

No.	Pos.	Nation	Player
22	GK	TUR	Abdulsamed Damlu
24	FW	ISL	Viðar Kjartansson (on loan from FC Rostov)
29	DF	MAR	Issam Chebake
30	GK	BEN	Fabien Farnolle
35	GK	TUR	Ufuk Ceylan
44	DF	ECU	Arturo Mina
45	DF	EGY	Karim Hafez (on loan from Wadi Degla)
53	DF	TUR	Yiğithan Güveli
54	MF	FRA	Rémi Walter
55	MF	BDI	Youssouf Ndayishimiye
90	GK	TUR	Muhammed Enes Salik
91	DF	TUR	Sakıb Aytaç

== Süper Lig ==
=== League table ===
Pos	Team	Pld	W	D	L	GF	GA	GD	Pts
14	Denizlispor	34	9	8	17	31	48	−17	35 (Note: Head-to-head points: Denizlispor 4, Rizespor 1)
15	Rizespor	34	10	5	19	38	57	−19	35
16	Yeni Malatyaspor	34	8	8	18	44	51	−7	32 (Note: Head-to-head points: Yeni Malatyaspor 6, Kayserispor 5, Ankaragücü 5. Head-to-head goal difference: Yeni Malatyaspor +6, Kayserispor -3, Ankaragücü -3. Head-to-head goals scored: Yeni Malatyaspor 9, Kayserispor 4, Ankaragücü 3.)
17	Kayserispor	34	8	8	18	40	72	−32	32
18	Ankaragücü	34	7	11	16	31	56	−25	32

Source: Süper Lig, Soccerway
Rules for classification: 1) Points; 2) Head-to-head points; 3) Head-to-head goal difference; 4) Head-to-head goals scored; 5) Goal difference; 6) Goals scored; 7) Play-off.

=== Results summary ===
Overall								Home						Away					
Pld	W	D	L	GF	GA	GD	Pts	W	D	L	GF	GA	GD	W	D	L	GF	GA	GD
32	8	8	16	44	47	−3	32	5	4	8	23	21	+2	3	4	8	21	26	−5

Source: TFF

=== Results by round ===
Round	1	2	3	4	5	6	7	8	9	10	11	12	13	14	15	16	17	18	19	20	21	22	23	24	25	26	27	28	29	30	31	32	33	34
Ground	H	A	H	A	H	A	H	A	H	A	A	H	A	H	A	H	A	A	H	A	H	A	H	A	H	A	H	H	A	H	A	H	A	H
Result	W	L	L	W	D	L	W	W	W	D	D	D	D	L	W	L	D	L	L	L	L	L	L	L	D	L	L	W	L	D	W	L		
Position	3	7	12	7	8	13	9	5	3	3	7	6	7	8	7	8	8	9	9	10	10	10	12	13	13	15	16	14	15	16	13	15		

Updated to match(es) played on 16 July 2020. Source: TFF.org
A = Away; H = Home; W = Win; D = Draw; L = Loss

== Matches ==
18 August 2019 1	Yeni Malatyaspor	3–0	İstanbul Başakşehir	Malatya
21.45	Ghailene Chaalali (yellow card) 45'; Murat Yıldırım (yellow card) 48'; Robin Yalçın (yellow card) 60'; Guilherme Costa Marques 68'; Adis Jahović 87'; Moryké Fofana 90'	Report	(yellow card) 59' (yellow card) 67' (red card) İrfan Kahveci	Stadium: Malatya Arena; Referee: Hüseyin Göçek; Assistant referees: Alpaslan Dedeş, Mehmet Cem Hanoğlu; Fourth official: Çağdaş Altay; Fifth official: Fırat Aydınus, Serkan Olguncan

25 August 2019 2	Trabzonspor	2–1	Yeni Malatyaspor	Trabzon
19.15	José Sosa (yellow card) 19'; Abdülkadir Ömür 44'; João Pereira 78'	Report	(yellow card) 66' Erkan Kaş; 89' Eren Tozlu; (yellow card) 90' Adis Jahović	Stadium: Şenol Güneş Stadium; Referee: Koray Gençerler; Assistant referees: İbrahim Çağlar Uyarcan, Volkan Ahmet Narinç; Fourth official: Yiğit Arslan; Fifth official: Halis Özkahya, Murat Erdoğan

1 September 2019 3	Yeni Malatyaspor	2–3	Alanyaspor	Malatya
21.45	Sakıb Aytaç (yellow card) 9'; Özer Özdemir (yellow card) 41'; Thievy Bifouma 47'; Adis Jahović 57'; Ghailene Chaalali (yellow card) 73'; Mitchell Donald (yellow card) 90'	Report	20' Ceyhun Gülselam; 22' Júnior Fernándes; 44' Papiss Cissé; (yellow card) 73' Manolis Siopis; (yellow card) 76' Fabrice N'Sakala	Stadium: Malatya Arena; Referee: Alper Ulusoy; Assistant referees: Mehmet Metin, Özgür Ertem; Fourth official: Direnç Tonusluoğlu; Fifth official: Hakan Ceylan, Cevdet Kömürcüoğlu

15 September 2019 4	MKE Ankaragücü	0–4	Yeni Malatyaspor	Ankara
17.00	Ante Kulušić (yellow card) 29'; Stelios Kitsiou (yellow card) 45' (yellow card) 76' (red card); Tiago Pinto (yellow card) 90'	Report	(yellow card) 25' (goal) 82' Mitchell Donald; 26' Adis Jahović; 33' Thievy Bifouma; 43' Guilherme Costa Marques; (yellow card) 51' Ghaylen Chaaleli; (yellow card) 71' Afriyie Acquah	Stadium: Eryaman Stadium; Referee: Volkan Bayarslan; Assistant referees: Bahtiyar Birinci, Yusuf Bozdoğan; Fourth official: Bayram Başkan; Fifth official: Ümit Öztürk, Sarper Barış Saka

22 September 2019 5	Yeni Malatyaspor	1–1	Galatasaray	Malatya
19.00	Afriyie Acquah (yellow card) 32'; Guilherme 87'	Report	23' Jean Michaël Seri; (yellow card) 63' Ömer Bayram; (yellow card) 77' Adem Büyük; (yellow card) 90' Şener Özbayraklı	Stadium: Malatya Arena; Attendance: 16.467; Referee: Arda Kardeşler; Assistant referees: Kerem Ersoy, Samet Çiçek; Fourth official: Yiğit Arslan; Fifth official: Mete Kalkavan, Esat Sancaktar

29 September 2019 6	Antalyaspor	3–0	Yeni Malatyaspor	Antalya
16.30	Aatif Chahechouhe 38'; Ufuk Akyol (yellow card) 53' (goal) 61'; Hakan Özmert 90'; Charles Fernando Basílio da Silva (yellow card) 90+3'	Report	(yellow card) 40' Sakıb Aytaç; (red card) 88' Mustafa Akbaş; (yellow card) 90+1' Erkan Kaş	Stadium: New Antalya Stadium; Attendance: 8.485; Referee: Bahattin Şimşek; Assistant referees: Mehmet Kısal, İbrahim Bozbey; Fourth official: Emre Kargın; Fifth official: Özgüç Türkalp, Sinan Dereci

4 October 2019 7	Yeni Malatyaspor	5–1	Denizlispor	Malatya
20.30	Adis Jahović 28' (pen.) 61' (pen.) 69', 90'; Mitchell Donald 34'; Sakıb Aytaç (yellow card) 45'; Ghaylène Chaalali (yellow card) 79'	Report	(yellow card) 26' Oğuz Yılmaz; (yellow card) 27' Cristian Săpunaru; (yellow card) 28' Tiago Lopes; (yellow card) 61' Radosław Murawski; (yellow card) 64' Olcay Şahan; 65' Hugo Rodallega; (yellow card) 76' Adam Stachowiak	Stadium: Malatya Arena; Attendance: 6.703; Referee: Bülent Birincioğlu; Assistant referees: İlker Takpak, Abdullah Bora Özkara; Fourth official: Mustaya Aydın; Fifth official: Özgür Yankaya, Esat Sancaktar

21 October 2019 8	Konyaspor	0–2	Yeni Malatyaspor	Konya
20.00	Serkan Kırıntılı (red card) 1'; Marko Jevtović (yellow card) 24'	Report	4' Guilherme Costa Marques; (yellow card) 12' Mustafa Akbaş; 52' Robin Yalçın; (yellow card) 65' Issam Chebake	Stadium: Büyükşehir Belediye Stadyumu; Attendance: 19.773; Referee: Mustafa Öğretmenoğlu; Assistant referees: Candaş Elbil, Mehmet Salih Mazlum; Fourth official: Adem Sarıtaş; Fifth official: Mete Kalkavan, Ceyhun Sesigüzel

27 October 2019 9	Yeni Malatyaspor	4–0	Kayserispor	Malatya
14.00	Moryké Fofana (yellow card) 9'; Mitchell Donald 15'; Adis Jahović 77'; Thievy Bifouma 85'	Report	(yellow card) 40' Hasan Hüseyin Acar; (yellow card) 68' Pedro Henrique Konzen; (yellow card) 76' Ben Rienstra	Stadium: Malatya Arena; Attendance: 7.994; Referee: Zorbay Küçük; Assistant referees: Ekrem Kan-Deniz Caner Özalan; Fourth official: Yakup Özhan; Fifth official: Yaşar Kemal Uğurlu, Kerem Ersoy

3 November 2019 10	Kasımpaşa	2–2	Yeni Malatyaspor	Istanbul
16.30	Bengali-Fodé Koita 13'; Ricardo Quaresma (yellow card) 33'; Veysel Sarı 67'; Syam Ben Youssef (yellow card) 75'; Abdul Khalili 90+3'	Report	62' Adis Jahović; (yellow card) 17' (yellow card) 77' (red card) Robin Yalçın; (yellow card) 90+5' Sakıb Aytaç	Stadium: Recep Tayyip Erdoğan Stadium; Attendance: 4.012; Referee: Halis Özkahya; Assistant referees: Mehmet Cem Hanoğlu, Murat Ergin Gözütok; Fourth official: Direnç Tonusluoğlu; Fifth official: Hakan Ceylan, Burak Şeker

10 November 2019 11	Göztepe	1–1	Yeni Malatyaspor	İzmir
14.00	Serdar Gürler 9'; Soner Aydoğdu (yellow card) 60'; Cameron Jerome (yellow card) 67'; Berkan Emir (yellow card) 80'; Alpaslan Öztürk (yellow card) 87' (yellow card) 90+7' (red card); Celso Borges (yellow card) 83'	Report	(yellow card) 39' Afriyie Acquah; (yellow card) 59' Murat Yıldırım; (yellow card) 71' Teenage Hadebe; 83' (pen.) Gökhan Töre; (yellow card) 87' (yellow card) 90+7' (red card) Eren Tozlu; (yellow card) 88' Erkan Kaş	Stadium: Bornova Stadium; Attendance: 7.689; Referee: Arda Kardeşler; Assistant referees: İsmail Şencan, Alpaslan Dedeş; Fourth official: Mustafa Aydın; Fifth official: Tugay Kaan Numanoğlu, Murat Erdoğan

24 November 2019 12	Yeni Malatyaspor	0–0	Fenerbahçe	Malatya
19.00	Issam Chebake (yellow card) 43'; Arturo Mina (yellow card) 45'; Mustafa Akbaş (yellow card) 90'	Report	(yellow card) 43' Hasan Ali Kaldırım; (yellow card) 45' Alper Potuk; (penalty missed) 45+10' Emre Belözoğlu; (yellow card) 66' Nabil Dirar; (yellow card) 90' Garry Rodrigues	Stadium: Malatya Arena; Attendance: 16.663; Referee: Mete Kalkavan; Assistant referees: Ceyhun Sesigüzel, Erdem Bayık; Fourth official: Yiğit Arslan; Fifth official: Mustafa Öğretmenoğlu, Esat Sancaktar

29 November 2019 13	Gençlerbirliği	3–3	Yeni Malatyaspor	Ankara
20.30	Erdem Özgenç (yellow card) 32'; Giovanni Sio 52' (yellow card) 90+4'; Bogdan Stancu 76' (pen.); Rahmetullah Berişbek 90+1'	Report	44' Thievy Bifouma; (yellow card) 74' Murat Yıldırım; 85', 88' Robin Yalçın; (yellow card) 90+3' Moryké Fofana	Stadium: Eryaman Stadium; Attendance: 3.774; Referee: Zorbay Küçük; Assistant referees: İbrahim Çağlar Uyarcan, Hakan Yemişken; Fourth official: Adem Sarıtaş; Fifth official: Burak Şeker, Murat Erdoğan

7 December 2019 14	Yeni Malatyaspor	1–3	Sivasspor	Malatya
15.00	Guilherme Costa Marques 37' (yellow card) 87'; Issam Chebake (yellow card) 62'	Report	26' (yellow card) 51' Hakan Arslan; 30' Mert Hakan Yandaş; (yellow card) 45+1' Fernando; (yellow card) 51' Fatih Aksoy; 54' Emre Kılınç; (yellow card) 79' Erdoğan Yeşilyurt	Stadium: Malatya Arena; Attendance: 9.091; Referee: Ümit Öztürk; Assistant referees: Osman Gökhan Bilir, Kamil Çetin; Fourth official: Yalçın Taşkınfurat; Fifth official: Serkan Tokat, Serkan Olguncan

15 December 2019 15	Beşiktaş	0–2	Yeni Malatyaspor	Istanbul
19.00	Adem Ljajić (yellow card) 46'; Jeremain Lens (yellow card) 80'; Caner Erkin (yellow card) 44' (yellow card) 90+6' (red card); Umut Nayir (yellow card) 90+7'; Loris Karius (yellow card) 90+7'	Report	(yellow card) 5' Mitchell Donald; (yellow card) 10' Issam Chebake; (yellow card) 81' Guilherme; 85' Thievy Bifouma; 90+7' Adis Jahović	Stadium: Vodafone Park; Attendance: 31.053; Referee: Yaşar Kemal Uğurlu; Assistant referees: Mustafa Emre Eyisoy, Samet Çiçek; Fourth official: Sarper Barış Saka; Fifth official: Atilla Karaoğlan, Kerem Ersoy

21 December 2019 16	Yeni Malatyaspor	0–2	Çaykur Rizespor	Malatya
15.00	Mustafa Akbaş (yellow card) 19'; Robin Yalçın (yellow card) 45+1'	Report	6' Oğulcan Çağlayan; (yellow card) 52' (goal) 72' Aminu Umar; (yellow card) 70' Mykola Morozyuk; (yellow card) 75' Ismaël Diomandé	Stadium: Malatya Arena; Attendance: 5.841; Referee: Ali Palabıyık; Assistant referees: Serkan Olguncan, Serkan Çimen; Fourth official: Mustafa İlker Çoşkun; Fifth official: Bahattin Şimşek, Alper Çetin

29 December 2019 17	Gaziantep	1–1	Yeni Malatyaspor	Gaziantep
16.30	Olarenwaju Kayode 21'; Güray Vural (yellow card) 33' (yellow card) 49' (red card); Kenan Özer (yellow card) 36'; Jean-Armel Kana-Biyik (yellow card) 51'; Jefferson Nogueira Júnior (yellow card) 53'	Report	(yellow card) 31' Guilherme Costa Marques; (yellow card) 42' Teenage Hadebe; (yellow card) 45+2' (goal) 78' Thievy Bifouma; (yellow card) 54' Robin Yalçın; (red card) 54' Adis Jahović	Stadium: New Gaziantep Stadium; Attendance: 5.248; Referee: Bahattin Şimşek; Assistant referees: Alpaslan Dedeş, Mustafa Savranlar; Fourth official: Çağdaş Altay; Fifth official: Mustafa Öğretmenoğlu, Murat Erdoğan

18 January 2020 18	İstanbul Başakşehir	4–1	Yeni Malatyaspor	Istanbul
17.00	Edin Višća 21'; Demba Ba 26' (yellow card) 59'; İrfan Kahveci (yellow card) 31' (goal) 33'; Mahmut Tekdemir 41'	Report	(yellow card) 35' Thievy Bifouma; (yellow card) 45+2' Afriyie Acquah; 63' Adis Jahović; (yellow card) 79' Robin Yalçın; (yellow card) 84' Teenage Hadebe	Stadium: Başakşehir Fatih Terim Stadium; Attendance: 2.060; Referee: Serkan Tokat; Assistant referees: Tarık Ongun, İbrahim Çağlar Uyarcan; Fourth official: Serkan Önsal; Fifth official: Bülent Birincioğlu, Emre Kargın

11 March 2020 19	Yeni Malatyaspor	3–1	Trabzonspor	Malatya
20.00	Mitchell Donald (yellow card) 4'; Afriyie Acquah (yellow card) 26'; Gökhan Töre (yellow card) 29'; Umut Bulut 44'	Report	10' (yellow card) 69' Filip Novák; 30' José Sosa; (yellow card) 37' Gastón Campi; 55' Anthony Nwakaeme	Stadium: Malatya Arena; Attendance: 9.571; Referee: Ali Palabıyık; Assistant referees: Serkan Olguncan, Mustafa Sönmez; Fourth official: Mustafa İlker Çoşkun; Fifth official: Mustafa Öğretmenoğlu, Emre Malok
Note: The match, which was scheduled to be played on January 27 but was postponed due to the earthquake in Elazığ, was played on March 11.

2 February 2020 20	Alanyaspor	2–1	Yeni Malatyaspor	Alanya, Antalya
16.00	Welinton (yellow card) 40'; Anastasios Bakasetas 45+1'; Papiss Cissé 48' (pen.); Fabrice N'Sakala (red card) 60'; Júnior Fernándes (yellow card) 90+5'	Report	(yellow card) 50' Teenage Hadebe; (yellow card) 66' Murat Yıldırım; (yellow card) 79' Arturo Mina; 90+4' Issam Chebake	Stadium: Bahçeşehir Okulları Stadium; Attendance: 4.904; Referee: Mete Kalkavan; Assistant referees: Ceyhun Sesigüzel, Esat Sancaktar; Fourth official: Muhammet Ali Metoğlu; Fifth official: Hakan Ceylan, Burak Pakkan

7 February 2020 21	Yeni Malatyaspor	0–1	MKE Ankaragücü	Malatya
20.00	Mustafa Akbaş (red card) 49'; Ahmed Ildiz (yellow card) 85'	Report	66' Dever Orgill; (yellow card) 89' Atila Turan; (yellow card) 90+1' Tiago Pinto	Stadium: Malatya Arena; Attendance: 4.500; Referee: Fırat Aydınus; Assistant referees: Aleks Taşcıoğlu, Erdem Bayık; Fourth official: Bilal Köseoğlu; Fifth official: Mustafa Öğretmenoğlu, Yiğit Arslan

16 February 2020 22	Galatasaray	1–0	Yeni Malatyaspor	Istanbul
19.00	Sofiane Feghouli (yellow card) 20'; Adem Büyük 45' (pen.); Marcão (yellow card) 50'	Report	(yellow card) 13' Afriyie Acquah; (yellow card) 20' Gökhan Töre; (yellow card) 44' Robin Yalçın	Stadium: Türk Telekom Stadium; Attendance: 36.160; Referee: Alper Ulusoy; Assistant referees: Ali Saygın Ögel, İsmail Şencan; Fourth official: Ramazan Keleş; Fifth official: Tugay Kaan Numanoğlu, Çağdaş Altay

23 February 2020 23	Yeni Malatyaspor	1–2	Antalyaspor	Malatya
13.30	Umut Bulut 29'; Arturo Mina (yellow card) 39'; Robin Yalçın (yellow card) 90+5'	Report	8' Fredy; (yellow card) 26' (yellow card) 31' (red card) Sinan Gümüş; 89' Lukas Podolski	Stadium: Malatya Arena; Attendance: 7.571; Referee: Yaşar Kemal Uğurlu; Assistant referees: Serkan Çimen, Mustafa Sönmez; Fourth official: Caner Ak; Fifth official: Halis Özkahya, Erdinç Sezertam

1 March 2020 24	Denizlispor	2–0	Yeni Malatyaspor	Denizli
13.30	Mustafa Yumlu 34'; Modou Barrow 75'	Report	(yellow card) 18' Robin Yalçın; (yellow card) 38' Arturo Mina; (red card) 45+1' Teenage Hadebe; (yellow card) 83' Youssouf Ndayishimiy; (yellow card) 90+3' Murat Yıldırım	Stadium: Atatürk Stadyumu; Attendance: 5.907; Referee: Koray Gençerler; Assistant referees: Serkan Ok, Bilal Gölen; Fourth official: Adem Sarıtaş; Fifth official: Cüneyt Çakır, Tarık Ongun

7 March 2020 25	Yeni Malatyaspor	1–1	Konyaspor	Malatya
14.00	Issam Chebake (red card) 45+3'; Mustafa Akbaş (yellow card) 66'; Murat Yıldırım 80'	Report	(yellow card) 45+1' Levan Shengelia; 45+5' (pen.) Riad Bajić; (yellow card) 79' Nejc Skubic; (red card) 88' Serkan Kırıntılı	Stadium: Malatya Arena; Attendance: 5.690; Referee: Cüneyt Çakır; Assistant referees: Bahattin Duran, Tarık Ongun; Fourth official: Sinan Dereci; Fifth official: Özkür Yankaya, Kadir Sağlam

15 March 2020 26	Kayserispor	2–1	Yeni Malatyaspor	Kayseri
13.30	Muris Mešanović 22'; Pedro Henrique Konzen 42' (yellow card) 72'; Bernard Mensah (penalty missed) 45+3'; Zoran Kvržić (yellow card) 50'; Gustavo Campanharo (yellow card) 90+2'	Report	(yellow card) 45+3' Arturo Mina; 70' Viðar Örn Kjartansson	Stadium: Kadir Has Şehir Stadyumu; Attendance: 0 Referee: Ali Şansalan; Assistant referees: Mehmet Cem Satman, İlker Takpak; Fourth official: Adem Cinek; Fifth official: Burak Şeker, Emre Kargın

13 June 2020 27	Yeni Malatyaspor	1–2	Kasımpaşa	Malatya
21.00	Mitchell Donald 45+3'; Issam Chebake (yellow card) 90+3'	Report	(yellow card) 39' Oussama Haddadi; 61', 67' Mame Baba Thiam; (yellow card) 90+6' Zvonimir Šarlija	Stadium: Malatya Arena; Attendance: 0 Referee: Halil Umut Meler; Assistant referees: Mustafa Emre Eyisoy, Cevdet Kömürcüoğlu; Fourth official: Emre Kargın; Fifth official: Serkan Tokat, Ramazan Keleş

20 June 2020 28	Yeni Malatyaspor	2–1	Göztepe	Malatya
21.00	Umut Bulut 40'; Viðar Örn Kjartansson 78'; Teenage Hadebe (yellow card) 79'	Report	76' (pen.) (yellow card) 90+4' Alpaslan Öztürk	Stadium: Malatya Arena; Attendance: 0 Referee: Özgür Yankaya; Assistant referees: Mehmet Metin, Mehmet Cem Hanoğlu; Fourth official: Yasin Kol; Fifth official: Ali Şansalan, Adem Cinek

27 June 2020 29	Fenerbahçe	3–2	Yeni Malatyaspor	Istanbul
18.30	Deniz Türüç (yellow card) 19'; Vedat Muriqi 70'; Garry Rodrigues (yellow card) 77'; Hasan Ali Kaldırım (yellow card) 80'; Ozan Tufan 90+1', 90+6'	Report	(yellow card) 7' (yellow card) 65' (red card) Gökhan Töre; (yellow card) 64' Mustafa Akbaş; (yellow card) 71' Fabien Farnolle; 81' Youssouf Ndayishimiye; 89' Mitchell Donald	Stadium: Şükrü Saracoğlu Stadyumu; Attendance: 0 Referee: Ali Şansalan; Assistant referees: Kerem Ersoy, Mehmet Cem Satman; Fourth official: Burak Şeker; Fifth official: Koray Gençerler, Emre Kargın

4 July 2020 30	Yeni Malatyaspor	0–0	Gençlerbirliği	Malatya
18.30	Murat Yıldırım (yellow card) 18'; Youssouf Ndayishimiye (yellow card) 18'; Arturo Mina (yellow card) 57'; Umut Bulut (yellow card) 59'; Issam Chebake (yellow card) 62'	Report	(yellow card) 60' Sefa Yılmaz; (yellow card) 90+1' Berat Özdemir	Stadium: Malatya Arena; Attendance: 0 Referee: Abdulkadir Bitigen; Assistant referees: Volkan Ahmet Narinç, Mustafa Savranlar; Fourth official: Caner Ak; Fifth official: Volkan Bayarslan, Kutluhan Bilgiç

8 July 2020 31	Sivasspor	0–1	Yeni Malatyaspor	Sivas
18.30	Mustapha Yatabaré (yellow card) 26'	Report	(yellow card) 29' Teenage Hadebe; 68' Afriyie Acquah; (yellow card) 86' Fabien Farnolle	Stadium: New Sivas 4 Eylül Stadium; Attendance: 0 Referee: Yaşar Kemal Uğurlu; Assistant referees: Erdinç Sezertam, Serkan Çimen; Fourth official: Hakan Ceylan; Fifth official: Arda Kardeşler, Oğuzhan Uğurlu

13 July 2020 32	Yeni Malatyaspor	0–1	Beşiktaş	Malatya
21.00		Report	52' (pen.) Caner Erkin; (yellow card) 80' Georges-Kévin Nkoudou; (yellow card) 85' Víctor Ruiz	Stadium: Malatya Arena; Attendance: 0 Referee: Fırat Aydınus; Assistant referees: Aleks Taşcıoğlu, Erdem Bayık; Fourth official: Yasin Kol; Fifth official: Alper Ulusoy, Alper Çetin

19 July 2020 33	Çaykur Rizespor	3–0	Yeni Malatyaspor	Rize
21.00		Report		Stadium: Yeni Rize Şehir Stadium; Attendance: 0 Referee: Yaşar Kemal Uğurlu; Assistant referees: Erdinç Sezertam, Serkan Çimen; Fourth official: Sarper Barış Saka

July 2020 34	Yeni Malatyaspor	0–1	Gaziantep	Malatya
		Report		Stadium: Malatya Arena

== UEFA Europa League ==
=== Second qualifying round ===
25 July 2019 2nd qualifying round 1st leg	Yeni Malatyaspor (Turkey)	2–2	(Slovenia) Olimpija Ljubljana	Malatya, Turkey
19:00 EEST (UTC+3)	Mina 20'; Jahović 66' (pen.)	Report	Vukušić 13'; Savić 74'	Stadium: Malatya Stadium; Attendance: 9,146; Referee: João Pinheiro (Portugal)

1 August 2019 2nd qualifying round 2st leg	Olimpija Ljubljana (Slovenia)	0–1 (2–3 agg.)	(Turkey) Yeni Malatyaspor	Ljubljana, Slovenia
20:00 EEST (UTC+2)		Report	Jahović 77'	Stadium: Stožice Stadium; Attendance: 7,812; Referee: Filip Glova (Slovakia)

=== Third qualifying round ===
8 August 2019 3nd qualifying round 1st leg	Partizan (Serbia)	3–1	(Turkey) Yeni Malatyaspor	Belgrade, Serbia
21:00 EEST (UTC+2)	Sadiq 4'; Asano 67'; Soumah 90' (pen.)	Report	Chebake 83'	Stadium: Partizan Stadium; Attendance: 13,442; Referee: Sergey Ivanov (Russia)

15 August 2019 3nd qualifying round 2st leg	Yeni Malatyaspor (Turkey)	1–0 (2–3 agg.)	(Serbia) Partizan	Malatya, Turkey
20:00 EEST (UTC+3)	Jahović 7'	Report		Stadium: Malatya Stadium; Attendance: 14,665; Referee: Chris Kavanagh (England)
