= 2019–20 Gençlerbirliği S.K. season =

Gençlerbirliği
2019–20 season
- Chairman: Murat Cavcav
- Manager: Hamza Hamzaoğlu
- Stadium: Eryaman Stadium
- Süper Lig: 12th
- Turkish Cup: Fourth round
- Top goalscorer: Bogdan Stancu (14)
Home colours	Away colours	Third colours

The 2019–20 season was Gençlerbirliği's 97th year in existence. In addition to the domestic league, Gençlerbirliği participated in the Turkish Cup.

== Squad ==
As of 26 January 2020

Note: Flags indicate national team as defined under FIFA eligibility rules; some limited exceptions apply. Players may hold more than one non-FIFA nationality.

No.	Pos.	Nation	Player
2	DF	TUR	Ahmet Oğuz
3	DF	TUR	Halil Pehlivan
5	MF	TUR	Berat Özdemir
6	MF	AUT	Yasin Pehlivan
7	FW	TUR	Nadir Çiftçi
8	MF	BRA	Fabrício Baiano
9	FW	ROU	Bogdan Stancu
10	MF	BEN	Stéphane Sessègnon
11	FW	TOG	Floyd Ayité
13	FW	CIV	Giovanni Sio
14	DF	TUR	Rahmi Can Karadaş
15	MF	SEN	Zargo Touré
17	MF	TUR	Sefa Yılmaz
18	DF	NED	Mike van Beijnen
19	MF	TUR	Rahmetullah Berişbek
20	MF	NED	Mats Seuntjens

No.	Pos.	Nation	Player
21	MF	POR	Daniel Candeias
22	DF	TUR	Erdem Özgenç
23	MF	TUR	Soner Dikmen
24	DF	TUR	Arda Kızıldağ
25	GK	TUR	Ertaç Özbir
26	MF	TUR	Gökhan Altıparmak
27	GK	SEN	Abdoulaye Diallo
28	MF	GUI	Sadio Diallo
32	DF	BRA	Flávio
39	DF	FRA	Pierre-Yves Polomat
44	DF	TUR	Ömer Alper Tatlısu
55	DF	TUR	Abdullah Şahindere
89	GK	SWE	Kristoffer Nordfeldt
99	FW	TUR	İlker Karakaş
—	GK	TUR	Burak Çapkınoğlu

== Süper Lig ==
=== League table ===
Pos	Team	Pld	W	D	L	GF	GA	GD	Pts
10	Kasımpaşa	34	12	7	15	53	58	−5	43
11	Göztepe	34	11	9	14	44	49	−5	42
12	Gençlerbirliği	34	9	9	16	39	56	−17	36 (Note: Head-to-head points: Gençlerbirliği 4, Konyaspor 1)
13	Konyaspor	34	8	12	14	36	52	−16	36
14	Denizlispor	34	9	8	17	31	48	−17	35 (Note: Head-to-head points: Denizlispor 4, Rizespor 1)

Source: Süper Lig, Soccerway
Rules for classification: 1) Points; 2) Head-to-head points; 3) Head-to-head goal difference; 4) Head-to-head goals scored; 5) Goal difference; 6) Goals scored; 7) Play-off.

=== Results summary ===
Overall								Home						Away					
Pld	W	D	L	GF	GA	GD	Pts	W	D	L	GF	GA	GD	W	D	L	GF	GA	GD
32	9	9	14	39	51	−12	36	5	6	5	18	20	−2	4	3	9	21	31	−10

Source: TFF

=== Results by round ===
Round	1	2	3	4	5	6	7	8	9	10	11	12	13	14	15	16	17	18	19	20	21	22	23	24	25	26	27	28	29	30	31	32	33	34
Ground	H	A	H	A	H	A	H	A	H	A	H	A	H	A	H	H	A	A	H	A	H	A	H	A	H	A	H	A	H	A	H	A	A	H
Result	L	L	L	D	D	L	D	W	L	D	W	W	D	L	W	D	L	L	W	L	L	W	W	L	D	L	W	L	L	D	D	W		
Position	12	16	18	17	18	18	17	17	17	17	16	13	13	13	12	13	13	13	13	13	13	11	10	11	11	12	12	12	13	12	12	12		

Updated to match(es) played on 16 July 2020. Source: TFF.org
A = Away; H = Home; W = Win; D = Draw; L = Loss

== Matches ==
17 August 2019 1	Gençlerbirliği	0–1	Çaykur Rizespor	Ankara
19.15	Flávio Ramos (yellow card) 36' (yellow card) 39' (red card); Daniel Candeias (yellow card) 74'; Rahmetullah Berişbek (yellow card) 86'	Report	66' Dario Melnjak; (yellow card) 69' Nill De Pauw; (yellow card) 89' Braian Samudio	Stadium: Eryaman Stadium; Referee: Bahattin Şimşek; Assistant referees: Osman Gökhan Bilir, Kamil Çetin; Fourth official: Ferhan Kestanlıoğlu; Fifth official: Ali Şansalan, Burak Şeker

26 August 2019 2	Gazişehir Gaziantep	4–1	Gençlerbirliği	Gaziantep
20.00	Olarenwaju Kayode 32', 40' (pen.); Papy Djilobodji (yellow card) 45'; Güray Vural 56'; Oğuz Ceylan 72'	Report	(red card) 27' Ahmet Oğuz; (red card) 38' Pierre-Yves Polomat; (yellow card) 40' Zargo Touré; 69' Berat Özdemir	Stadium: New Gaziantep Stadium; Referee: Atilla Karaoğlan; Assistant referees: İsmail Şencan, Samet Çiçek; Fourth official: Cihan Aydın; Fifth official: Ümit Öztürk, Emre Malok

1 September 2019 3	Gençlerbirliği	1–2	İstanbul Başakşehir	Ankara
19.15	Giovanni Sio 36'; Baiano (yellow card) 42'; Berat Özdemir (yellow card) 45'; Soner Dikmen (yellow card) 78'; Zargo Touré (yellow card) 82'; Halil Pehlivan (yellow card) 88'	Report	(yellow card) 16' Enzo Crivelli; (yellow card) 45' Arda Turan; 83' (pen.) Demba Ba; 90' Edin Višća	Stadium: Eryaman Stadium; Referee: Cüneyt Çakır; Assistant referees: Bahattin Duran, Tarık Ongun; Fourth official: Turgut Doman; Fifth official: Serkan Tokat, Ceyhun Sesigüzel

15 September 2019 4	Trabzonspor	2–2	Gençlerbirliği	Trabzon
20.00	Filip Novák 17' (yellow card) 59'; Alexander Sørloth 57' (pen.); Majid Hosseini (yellow card) 63'	Report	(yellow card) 30' Pierre-Yves Polomat; 44' Bogdan Stancu; (yellow card) 45' Berat Özdemir; 84' Stéphane Sessègnon	Stadium: Şenol Güneş Stadium; Referee: Mete Kalkavan; Assistant referees: Ceyhun Sesigüzel, Esat Sancaktar; Fourth official: Onur Öztoprak; Fifth official: Hüseyin Göçek, Kerem Ersoy

22 September 2019 5	Gençlerbirliği	1–1	Alanyaspor	Ankara
16.30	Daniel Candeias (yellow card) 23'; Bogdan Stancu 45' (pen.); Pierre-Yves Polomat (yellow card) 63'; Baiano (yellow card) 88'	Report	(yellow card) 51' Djalma Campos; 66' Ceyhun Gülselam; (yellow card) 72' Welinton; (yellow card) 74' Manolis Siopis	Stadium: Eryaman Stadium; Attendance: 3.647; Referee: Zorbay Küçük; Assistant referees: Mehmet Cem Hanoğlu, İlker Takpak; Fourth official: Ramazan Keleş; Fifth official: Tugay Kaan Numanoğlu, Emre Malok

29 September 2019 6	MKE Ankaragücü	2–1	Gençlerbirliği	Ankara
16.30	Daniel Candeias 56' (k.k.); İlhan Parlak 68'; Sedat Ağçay (yellow card) 55'	Report	(yellow card) 23' Zargo Touré; (yellow card) 55' Giovanni Sio; 75' (k.k.) Korcan Çelikay	Stadium: Eryaman Stadium; Attendance: 6.788; Referee: Ümit Öztürk; Assistant referees: Osman Gökhan Bilir, Kamil Çetin; Fourth official: Oğuzhan Uğurlu; Fifth official: Bülent Birincioğlu, Esat Sancaktar

5 October 2019 7	Gençlerbirliği	0–0	Galatasaray	Ankara
20.00	Flávio Ramos (yellow card) 51'; Pierre-Yves Polomat (yellow card) 56'; Ahmet Oğuz (yellow card) 70' (yellow card) 86' (red card); Giovanni Sio (yellow card) 71'; Zargo Touré (yellow card) 81'; Berat Özdemir (yellow card) 90+5'	Report	(yellow card) 8' Ryan Donk; (yellow card) 29' Mariano Ferreira Filho; (yellow card) 81' Jimmy Durmaz; (yellow card) 90+4' Younès Belhanda	Stadium: Eryaman Stadium; Attendance: 10.275; Referee: Halil Umut Meler; Assistant referees: Mustafa Emre Eyisoy, Ekrem Kan; Fourth official: Turgut Doman; Fifth official: Abdullah Bitigen, Cevdet Kömürcüoğlu

19 October 2019 8	Antalyaspor	0–6	Gençlerbirliği	Antalya
15.00	Bahadır Öztürk (red card) 23'; Hakan Özmert (yellow card) 35'; Ferhat Kaplan (yellow card) 57'	Report	1', 21', 37' (yellow card) 60' Daniel Candeias; 12', 42' Giovanni Sio; 57' Bogdan Stancu; (yellow card) 90+1' Flávio Ramos	Stadium: New Antalya Stadium; Attendance: 7.255; Referee: Abdulkadir Bitigen; Assistant referees: Volkan Ahmet Narinç, Mustafa Savranlar; Fourth official: Bilal Köseoğlu; Fifth official: Alper Ulusoy, Mert Güzenge

27 October 2019 9	Gençlerbirliği	0–2	Denizlispor	Ankara
16.30	Giovanni Sio (yellow card) 16'	Report	34' Olcay Şahan; (yellow card) 61' Mustafa Yumlu; (yellow card) 71' Cristian Săpunaru; 90' (pen.) Radosław Murawski	Stadium: Eryaman Stadium; Attendance: 2.868; Referee: Halis Özkahya; Assistant referees: Ali Saygın Ögel, Bilal Gölen; Fourth official: Erdem Temel; Fifth official: Mustafa Öğretmenoğlu, İbrahim Çağlar Uyarcan

2 November 2019 10	Konyaspor	1–1	Gençlerbirliği	Konya
15.00	Farouk Miya 37'; Riad Bajić (yellow card) 88'	Report	(yellow card) 40' Pierre-Yves Polomat; (yellow card) 85' Nadir Çiftçi; 90+3' Yasin Pehlivan	Stadium: Büyükşehir Belediye Stadyumu; Attendance: 11.884; Referee: Volkan Bayarslan; Assistant referees: İlker Takpak, Abdullah Bora Özkara; Fourth official: Burak Taşkınsoy; Fifth official: Atilla Karaoğlan, Murat Erdoğan

9 November 2019 11	Gençlerbirliği	2–1	Kayserispor	Ankara
15.00	Aymen Abdennour 14' (o.g.); Giovanni Sio (yellow card) 61'; Bogdan Stancu 81'; Daniel Candeias (yellow card) 84'	Report	71' Emre Demir	Stadium: Eryaman Stadium; Attendance: 3.720; Referee: Ali Şansalan; Assistant referees: Candaş Elbil-Mehmet Salim Mazlum; Fourth official: Yasin Kol

24 November 2019 12	Kasımpaşa	1–2	Gençlerbirliği	Istanbul
16.30	Aytaç Kara 54'; Strahil Popov (yellow card) 87'	Report	(yellow card) 69' (goal) 82' 88' (pen.) Bogdan Stancu	Stadium: Recep Tayyip Erdoğan Stadium; Attendance: 1.919; Referee: Alper Ulusoy; Assistant referees: Volkan Ahmet Narinç, İbrahim Bozbey; Fourth official: Hasan Avcı; Fifth official: Koray Gençerler, Alper Çetin

29 November 2019 13	Gençlerbirliği	3–3	Yeni Malatyaspor	Ankara
20.30	Erdem Özgenç (yellow card) 32'; Giovanni Sio 52' (yellow card) 90+4'; Bogdan Stancu 76' (pen.); Rahmetullah Berişbek 90+1'	Report	44' Thievy Bifouma; (yellow card) 74' Murat Yıldırım; 85', 88' Robin Yalçın; (yellow card) 90+3' Moryké Fofana	Stadium: Eryaman Stadium; Attendance: 3.774; Referee: Zorbay Küçük; Assistant referees: İbrahim Çağlar Uyarcan, Hakan Yemişken; Fourth official: Adem Sarıtaş; Fifth official: Burak Şeker, Murat Erdoğan

6 December 2019 14	Fenerbahçe	5–2	Gençlerbirliği	Istanbul
20.30	Vedat Muriqi 23', 39'; Ozan Tufan (yellow card) 30'; Luiz Gustavo 32'; Vedat Muriqi (yellow card) 73'; Ferdi Kadioglu 74'; Hasan Ali Kaldırım (yellow card) 79'; Max Kruse 87'	Report	8' (yellow card) 20' Giovanni Sio; (yellow card) 52' Pierre-Yves Polomat; 78' Bogdan Stancu; (yellow card) 81' Daniel Candeias; (yellow card) 90' Bogdan Stancu	Stadium: Şükrü Saracoğlu Stadyumu; Attendance: 35.078; Referee: Ali Şansalan; Assistant referees: Kerem Ersoy, İsmail Şencan; Fourth official: Direnç Tonusluoğlu; Fifth official: Volkan Bayarslan, Tarık Ongun

14 December 2019 15	Gençlerbirliği	3–1	Göztepe	Ankara
17.30	Bogdan Stancu 29' , (yellow card) 54' , (goal) 67'; Giovanni Sio 35'; Mats Seuntjens (yellow card) 64'; Baiano (yellow card) 90+3'	Report	33' Wallace Reis; (yellow card) 77' Berkan Emir	Stadium: Eryaman Stadium; Attendance: 4.037; Referee: Cüneyt Çakır; Assistant referees: Tarık Ongun, Bahattin Duran; Fourth official: Erkan Ergin; Fifth official: Suat Arslanboğa, Çağdaş Altay

22 December 2019 16	Gençlerbirliği	2–2	Sivasspor	Ankara
14.00	Bogdan Stancu 56' , (yellow card) MS'; Floyd Ayité 60'; Baiano (yellow card) 77'; Berat Özdemir (yellow card) 90+1'	Report	Marcelo Goiano (yellow card) 21'; Arouna Koné 23'; Caner Osmanpaşa (yellow card) 42'; Mustapha Yatabaré 90+6'	Stadium: Eryaman Stadium; Attendance: 9.630; Referee: Halis Özkahya; Assistant referees: Cevdet Kömürcüoğlu, Samet Çavuş; Fourth official: Burak Taşkınsoy; Fifth official: Koray Gençerler, Burak Şeker

27 December 2019 17	Beşiktaş	4–1	Gençlerbirliği	Istanbul
20.30	Domagoj Vida 49'; Georges-Kévin Nkoudou 60'; Víctor Ruiz (yellow card) 62'; Oğuzhan Özyakup 74'; Umut Nayir (yellow card) 77'; Atiba Hutchinson 90+1'	Report	(red card) 11' Nadir Çiftçi; 23' Floyd Ayité; (red card) 36' Yasin Pehlivan; (yellow card) 74' Daniel Candeias; (yellow card) 77' Pierre-Yves Polomat; (yellow card) 88' Zargo Touré	Stadium: Vodafone Park; Attendance: 18.657; Referee: Fırat Aydınus; Assistant referees: Aleks Taşçıoğlu, Erdem Bayık; Fourth official: Caner Ak; Fifth official: Ali Şansalan, Kemal Yılmaz

20 January 2020 18	Çaykur Rizespor	2–0	Gençlerbirliği	Rize
20.00	Milan Škoda 70', 85'; Ismaël Diomandé (yellow card) 35'	Report	(yellow card) 27' Giovanni Sio	Stadium: Yeni Rize Şehir Stadium; Attendance: 3.257; Referee: Arda Kardeşler; Assistant referees: Ceyhun Sesigüzel, Candaş Elbil; Fourth official: Yakup Özhan; Fifth official: Volkan Bayarslan, Adem Cinek

24 January 2020 19	Gençlerbirliği	1–0	Gaziantep	Ankara
20.00	Giovanni Sio (yellow card) 43'; Pierre-Yves Polomat (yellow card) 56'; Stéphane Sessègnon 64' (pen.); Kristoffer Nordfeldt (yellow card) 79'	Report	(penalty missed) 58' Olarenwaju Kayode; (yellow card) 62' Jean-Armel Kana-Biyik; (yellow card) 76' Kenan Özer	Stadium: Eryaman Stadium; Attendance: 2.428; Referee: Mete Kalkavan; Assistant referees: Özgür Ertem, Osman Gökhan Bilir; Fourth official: Şeref Taştan; Fifth official: Halis Özkahya, Abdullah Buğra Taşkınsoy

31 January 2020 20	İstanbul Başakşehir	3–1	Gençlerbirliği	Istanbul
20.00	Enzo Crivelli 8' (yellow card) 89'; Edin Višća 48', 73'	Report	29' Floyd Ayité; (yellow card) 47' Baiano	Stadium: Başakşehir Fatih Terim Stadium; Attendance: 1.378; Referee: Alper Ulusoy; Assistant referees: İbrahim Bozbey, Bilal Gölen; Fourth official: Erkan Engin; Fifth official: Atilla Karaoğlan, Ekrem Kan

8 February 2020 21	Gençlerbirliği	0–2	Trabzonspor	Ankara
17.00	Nadir Çiftçi (yellow card) 39'; Halil Pehlivan (yellow card) 42'; Yasin Pehlivan (yellow card) 45+2'; Erdem Özgenç (yellow card) 76'; Ahmet Oğuz (yellow card) 77'; Zargo Touré (yellow card) 80'; Baiano (yellow card) 90+4'; Flávio Ramos (yellow card) 90+5'	Report	(yellow card) 19' Badou Ndiaye; 79' (pen.) José Sosa; 84' Anthony Nwakaeme; (red card) 90+4' Alexander Sørloth	Stadium: Eryaman Stadium; Attendance: 6.426; Referee: Hüseyin Göçek; Assistant referees: Serkan Ok, İlker Takpak; Fourth official: Murat Erdoğan; Fifth official: Bahattin Şimşek, Kerem Ersoy

16 February 2020 22	Alanyaspor	0–1	Gençlerbirliği	Alanya, Antalya
13.30	Ceyhun Gülselam (yellow card) 46'; Kaan Kanak (yellow card) 55'; Welinton (yellow card) 76'	Report	(yellow card) 39' Daniel Candeias; 75' Bogdan Stancu; (yellow card) 90+4' Kristoffer Nordfeldt	Stadium: Bahçeşehir Okulları Stadium; Attendance: 5.473; Referee: Atilla Karaoğlan; Assistant referees: Candaş Elbil, Deniz Caner Özaral; Fourth official: Yalçın Taşkınfurat; Fifth official: Fırat Aydınus, Abdullah Buğra Taşkınsoy

23 February 2020 23	Gençlerbirliği	1–0	MKE Ankaragücü	Ankara
16.00	Erdem Özgenç (yellow card) 61'; Yasin Pehlivan (yellow card) 70'; Giovanni Sio 74'	Report	(yellow card) 32' Ante Kulušić; (yellow card) 44' Daniel Łukasik; (yellow card) 88' Ricardo Faty	Stadium: Eryaman Stadium; Attendance: 5.651; Referee: Ali Şansalan; Assistant referees: İsmail Şencan, Kamil Çetin; Fourth official: Mustafa Aydın; Fifth official: Burak Şeker, Erkan Engin

1 March 2020 24	Galatasaray	3–0	Gençlerbirliği	Istanbul
19.00	Ryan Donk 3' (yellow card) 37'; Radamel Falcao 33', 69'	Report	(yellow card) 11' Yasin Pehlivan; (yellow card) 30' Baiano; (yellow card) 37' Giovanni Sio; (yellow card) 58' Daniel Candeias	Stadium: Türk Telekom Stadium; Attendance: 39.576; Referee: Arda Kardeşler; Assistant referees: Volkan Ahmet Narinç, Hakan Yemişken; Fourth official: Onur Özütoprak; Fifth official: Suat Arslanboğa, İbrahim Çağlar Uyarcan

9 March 2020 25	Gençlerbirliği	1–1	Antalyaspor	Ankara
20.00	Mats Seuntjens (yellow card) 27'; Giovanni Sio 53'; Zargo Touré (yellow card) 56'; Stéphane Sessègnon (yellow card) 64'	Report	(yellow card) 35' Chico; 82' Lukas Podolski	Stadium: Eryaman Stadium; Attendance: 4.849; Referee: Halil Umut Meler; Assistant referees: Mustafa Emre Eyisoy, Özgür Ertem; Fourth official: Ferhan Kestanlıoğlu; Fifth official: Fırat Aydınus, Yakup Özhan

14 March 2020 26	Denizlispor	1–0	Gençlerbirliği	Denizli
14.00	Ogenyi Onazi (yellow card) 15'; Hugo Rodallega 54'	Report	(yellow card) 58' Baiano; (yellow card) 83' Ahmet Oğuz	Stadium: Atatürk Stadyumu; Attendance: 0 Referee: Cüneyt Çakır; Assistant referees: Bahattin Duran, Tarık Ongun; Fourth official: İlker Yasin Avcı; Fifth official: Alper Ulusoy, Yiğit Arslan

14 June 2020 27	Gençlerbirliği	2–1	Konyaspor	Ankara
18.30	Giovanni Sio 59'; Berat Özdemir 83'; Erdem Özgenç (yellow card) 90'; Flávio Ramos (yellow card) 90+1'	Report	(yellow card) 43' Marin Aničić; 62' Marko Jevtović; (yellow card) 73' Ali Turan	Stadium: Eryaman Stadium; Attendance: 0 Referee: Alper Ulusoy; Assistant referees: İsmail Şencan, Deniz Caner Özaral; Fourth official: Adem Cinek; Fifth official: Suat Arslanboğa, Murat Erdoğan

20 June 2020 28	Kayserispor	2–0	Gençlerbirliği	Kayseri
18.30	Pedro Henrique 36'; Gustavo Campanharo (yellow card) 72'; Silviu Lung (yellow card) 73'; Artem Kravets 89' (yellow card) 90+2'; Cenk Şahin (yellow card) 90+2'	Report	(yellow card) 41' Giovanni Sio; (yellow card) 49' Baiano; (yellow card) 90+2' Berat Özdemir	Stadium: Kadir Has Şehir Stadyumu; Attendance: 0 Referee: Ümit Öztürk; Assistant referees: Samet Çavuş, Bahtiyar Birinci; Fourth official: Ramazan Keleş; Fifth official: Halis Özkahya, Yakup Özhan

29 June 2020 29	Gençlerbirliği	0–2	Kasımpaşa	Ankara
21.00	Yasin Pehlivan (yellow card) 89'; Flávio Ramos (yellow card) 90'	Report	17' Bengali-Fodé Koita; (yellow card) 27' Jorge Fernandes; 90+5' Dieumerci Ndongala	Stadium: Eryaman Stadium; Attendance: 0 Referee: Halis Özkahya; Assistant referees: Ekrem Kan, Hakan Yemişken; Fourth official: Yiğit Arslan; Fifth official: Özgür Yankaya, Oğuzhan Uğurlu

4 July 2020 30	Yeni Malatyaspor	0–0	Gençlerbirliği	Malatya
18.30	Murat Yıldırım (yellow card) 18'; Youssouf Ndayishimiye (yellow card) 18'; Arturo Mina (yellow card) 57'; Umut Bulut (yellow card) 59'; Issam Chebake (yellow card) 62'	Report	(yellow card) 60' Sefa Yılmaz; (yellow card) 90+1' Berat Özdemir	Stadium: Malatya Arena; Attendance: 0 Referee: Abdulkadir Bitigen; Assistant referees: Volkan Ahmet Narinç, Mustafa Savranlar; Fourth official: Caner Ak; Fifth official: Volkan Bayarslan, Kutluhan Bilgiç

7 July 2020 31	Gençlerbirliği	1–1	Fenerbahçe	Ankara
18.30	Yasin Pehlivan (yellow card) 54'; Bogdan Stancu 60'; Daniel Candeias (yellow card) 90'; Sefa Yılmaz (yellow card) 90'	Report	(yellow card) 16' Jailson Siqueira; (yellow card) 42' Ozan Tufan; (yellow card) 59' Hasan Ali Kaldırım; (yellow card) 74' Nabil Dirar; 81' Emre Belözoğlu	Stadium: Eryaman Stadium; Attendance: 0 Referee: Alper Ulusoy; Assistant referees: Mustafa Emre Eyisoy, İbrahim Bozbey; Fourth official: Murat Erdoğan; Fifth official: Koray Gençerler, Abdullah Buğra Taşkınsoy

11 July 2020 32	Göztepe	1–3	Gençlerbirliği	İzmir
21.00	Soner Aydoğdu (yellow card) 37'; Alpaslan Öztürk (yellow card) 78'; Alpaslan Öztürk 90+1'	Report	33' Giovanni Sio; 45+4' Bogdan Stancu; 75' (pen.) Stéphane Sessègnon; (yellow card) 77' Mats Seuntjens	Stadium: Bornova Stadium; Attendance: 0 Referee: Mete Kalkavan; Assistant referees: Ceyhun Sesigüzel, Kerem Ersoy; Fourth official: Sarper Barış Saka; Fifth official: Volkan Bayarslan, Bülent Birincioğlu

19 July 2020 33	Sivasspor	2–0	Gençlerbirliği	Sivas
21.00		Report		Stadium: New Sivas 4 Eylül Stadium; Attendance: 0 Referee: Ümit Öztürk; Assistant referees: İbrahim Bozbey, İlker Takpak; Fourth official: Yiğit Arslan

25 July 2020 34	Gençlerbirliği	0–3	Beşiktaş	Ankara
		Report		Stadium: Eryaman Stadium
