= 2020–21 Yeni Malatyaspor season =

Yeni Malatyaspor
2020–21 season
- Chairman: Adil Gevrek
- Manager: Hamza Hamzaoğlu
- Stadium: New Malatya Stadium
- Süper Lig: 13th
- Turkish Cup: Round of 16
- Top goalscorer: Adem Büyük (10)
Home colours	Away colours	Third colours

The 2020–21 season is Yeni Malatyaspor's 36th season in existence and the club's fourth consecutive season in the top flight of Turkish football. In addition to the domestic league, Yeni Malatyaspor will participate in this season's editions of the Turkish Cup. The season covers the period from July 2020 to 30 June 2021.

== Players ==
=== First-team squad ===
As of 4 February 2021

Note: Flags indicate national team as defined under FIFA eligibility rules; some limited exceptions apply. Players may hold more than one non-FIFA nationality.

No.	Pos.	Nation	Player
1	GK	TUR	Abdulsamed Damlu
4	MF	SCO	Stevie Mallan (on loan from Hibernian)
6	MF	GHA	Afriyie Acquah
7	FW	TUR	Berk Yıldız
8	MF	ARG	Fernando Zuqui (on loan from Estudiantes)
9	FW	TUR	Umut Bulut
10	MF	PER	Christian Cueva (on loan from Santos FC)
11	FW	COD	Jody Lukoki
12	FW	MLI	Aly Mallé
13	DF	BRA	Wallace
14	MF	TUR	Doğukan Emeksiz
15	DF	TUR	Mustafa Akbaş
17	DF	ZIM	Teenage Hadebe
18	DF	NGR	Seth Sincere
19	FW	GHA	Benjamin Tetteh (on loan from Sparta Prague)
20	MF	TUR	Ahmed Ildiz
21	FW	CIV	Moryké Fofana

No.	Pos.	Nation	Player
22	GK	ARG	Guido Herrera (on loan from Talleres)
24	FW	TUR	Olcay Şahan
25	GK	TUR	Ertaç Özbir
26	DF	TUR	Semih Kaya
36	GK	TUR	Murat Akşit
39	DF	TUR	Erkan Kaş
44	DF	TUR	Murat Akça
45	DF	EGY	Karim Hafez
57	DF	MAR	Issam Chebake
61	DF	TUR	Zeki Yavru
67	GK	TUR	Eray İşcan
70	DF	TUR	Erşan Yaşa
77	FW	TUR	Mustafa Eskihellaç
90	FW	TUR	Kubilay Kanatsızkuş
92	DF	TUR	Bülent Cevahir
98	FW	KOS	Jetmir Topalli
99	FW	TUR	Adem Büyük

=== Out on loan ===
Note: Flags indicate national team as defined under FIFA eligibility rules; some limited exceptions apply. Players may hold more than one non-FIFA nationality.

No.	Pos.	Nation	Player
—	GK	TUR	Emre Selen (at Adana Demirspor until 30 June 2021)
—	DF	TUR	Gökhan Akkan (at Ankaraspor until 30 June 2021)
—	DF	TUR	Burak Kavlak (at Elâzığ Karakoçan until 30 June 2021)

No.	Pos.	Nation	Player
—	FW	TUR	Yakup Alkan (at Fethiyespor until 30 June 2021)
—	FW	TUR	Ferhat Canlı (at Elâzığ Karakoçan until 30 June 2021)
—	FW	TUR	Furkan Yiğit (at Gölcükspor until 30 June 2021)

== Transfers ==
=== In ===
No.	Pos.	Nat.	Name	Age	Moving from	Type	Transfer window	Ends	Transfer fee	Source
98	FW	(Kosovo)	Jetmir Topalli	22	(Kosovo) Ballkani	Transfer	Summer	2023	Free	

=== Out ===
No.	Pos	Player	Transferred to	Fee	Date	Source
15			TBD		1 July 2020	

== Pre-season and friendlies ==
Win Draw Loss Fixtures

== Competitions ==
=== Overview ===
Competition	First match	Last match	Starting round	Final position	Record							
Competition	First match	Last match	Starting round	Final position	Pld	W	D	L	GF	GA	GD	Win %
Süper Lig	12 September 2020	May 2021	Matchday 1		31	7	12	12	39	45	−6	22.58
Turkish Cup	25 November 2020	12 January 2021	Third round	Round of 16	4	3	1	0	10	1	+9	75.00
Total					35	10	13	12	49	46	+3	28.57

Last updated: 8 April 2021
Source: TFF.org

=== Süper Lig ===
==== League table ====
Pos	Team	Pld	W	D	L	GF	GA	GD	Pts
13	Çaykur Rizespor	40	12	12	16	53	69	−16	48
14	Kasımpaşa	40	12	10	18	47	57	−10	46
15	Yeni Malatyaspor	40	10	15	15	49	53	−4	45
16	Antalyaspor	40	9	17	14	41	55	−14	44
17	Kayserispor	40	9	14	17	35	52	−17	41

Source: Süper Lig, Soccerway
Rules for classification: 1) Points; 2) Head-to-head points; 3) Head-to-head goal difference; 4) Head-to-head goals scored; 5) Goal difference; 6) Goals scored; 7) Play-off.

==== Results summary ====
Overall								Home						Away					
Pld	W	D	L	GF	GA	GD	Pts	W	D	L	GF	GA	GD	W	D	L	GF	GA	GD
27	7	10	10	33	36	−3	31	5	4	5	18	16	+2	2	6	5	15	20	−5

Last updated: 2 March 2021.
Source: Süper Lig

==== Results by round ====
Round	1	2	3	4	5	6	7	8	9	10	11	12	13	14	15	16	17	18	19	20	21	22	23	24	25	26	27	28	29	30	31	32	33	34	35	36	37	38	39	40	41	42
Ground	A	H	A	H	A	H	A	H	B	A	H	A	H	A	H	A	H	A	H	A	H	H	A	H	A	H	A	H	A	B	H	A	H	A	H	A	H	A	H	A	H	A
Result	L	D	L	W	D	W	L	W	B	D	D	W	W	D	L	L	D	L	W	W	L	D	D	L	D	L	D	L	L													
Position	20	17	19	16	15	9	14	11	13	13	12	10	8	8	8	9	10	14	10	9	9	10	10	10	10	13	13	13														

Updated to match(es) played on 6 March 2021. Source: TFF.org
A = Away; H = Home; B = Bye; W = Win; D = Draw; L = Loss

Note: Since the league has been expanded to 21 teams each team will earn a bye twice this season.

==== Matches ====
12 September 2020 1	Fatih Karagümrük	3–0	Yeni Malatyaspor	Istanbul
20:00 TRT (UTC+3)	Zukanović 4'; Erdinç (yellow card) 14'; Sarıgül (yellow card) 33'; Sobiech (yellow card) 38' (goal) 56'; Sabo 74'; Arveladze (yellow card) 77'	Report	Ildiz (yellow card) 34'; Hafez (yellow card) 72'; Büyük (yellow card) 75'	Stadium: Atatürk Olympic Stadium; Attendance: 0 Referee: Abdulkadir Bitigen

18 September 2020 2	Yeni Malatyaspor	1–1	Göztepe	Malatya
20:00	Büyük 30' (pen.)	Report	Akbunar 19'	Stadium: Malatya Arena; Attendance: 0 Referee: Cüneyt Çakιr; Fourth official: Onur Karabas

26 September 2020 3	Trabzonspor	3–1	Yeni Malatyaspor	Trabzon
19:00	Benik Afobe 24', 33'; Anthony Nwakaeme 45+3'; Lewis Baker (yellow card) 90+4'	Report	Adem Büyük 78' (pen.) (yellow card) 90+4'; Fernando Zuqui (yellow card) 80'; Benjamin Tetteh (yellow card) 90+4'	Stadium: Şenol Güneş Stadium; Attendance: 0 Referee: Özgür Yankaya; Assistant referees: Esat Sancaktar, İlker Takpak; Fourth official: Alper Çetin

3 October 2020 4	Yeni Malatyaspor	1–0	Antalyaspor	Malatya
13:30 TRT (UTC+3)	Tetteh 10'; Wallace (yellow card) 31'; Lukoki (yellow card) 38'; Hafez (yellow card) 45+4'; Damlu (yellow card) 86'	Report	Albayrak (yellow card) 38'; Fredy (yellow card) 67'	Stadium: Malatya Stadium; Attendance: 0 Referee: Alper Ulusoy

17 October 2020 5	Konyaspor	1–1	Yeni Malatyaspor	Konya
17:00 TRT	Bardakcı (yellow card) 18'; Çalık (yellow card) 63'; Uludağ (yellow card) 66'; Kravets 83'; Eduok (yellow card) 86'	Report	Tetteh (yellow card) 25'; Yavru 58'; Chebake (yellow card) 73'	Stadium: Konya Büyükşehir Stadium; Attendance: 0 Referee: Turgut Doman

25 October 2020 6	Yeni Malatyaspor	2–1	Gençlerbirliği	Malatya
13:30	Kaya 24'; Kanatsızkuş 53'	Report	Yıldırım 10'	Stadium: Malatya Arena; Attendance: 0 Referee: Halis Özkahya; Fourth official: Turgut Doman

1 November 2020 7	Beşiktaş	1–0	Yeni Malatyaspor	Istanbul
19:00 TRT (UTC+3)	Larin 55', (yellow card) 90+3'; Ghezzal (yellow card) 59'; Hutchinson (yellow card) 65'	Report		Stadium: Vodafone Park; Attendance: 0 Referee: Atilla Karaoglan

8 November 2020 8	Yeni Malatyaspor	2–0	Denizlispor	Malatya
13:30	Kubilay Kanatsızkuş 7'; Afriyie Acquah 17'; Jody Lukoki (yellow card) 56'	Report	(yellow card) 39' Fabiano Leismann; (yellow card) 74' Radosław Murawski	Stadium: Malatya Stadium; Attendance: 0 Referee: Mete Kalkavan; Assistant referees: Erdem Bayık, Mehmet Yıldırım; Fourth official: Çağdaş Altay

9	BYE

28 November 2020 10	Gaziantep	2–2	Yeni Malatyaspor	Gaziantep
13:30	Mirallas 19'; Demir (yellow card) 44'; Maxim (yellow card) 45+4'; Özer (yellow card) 45+4'; Ceylan (yellow card) 45+6' (yellow-red card) 48'; Toșca (yellow card) 52'; Kana-Biyik 74'	Report	Büyük 49'; Acquah (yellow card) 51'; Kanatsızkuş (yellow card) 65'; Karim Hafez (yellow card) 84'; Topalli 90+5'	Stadium: Gaziantep Arena; Attendance: 0 Referee: Ali Palabıyık

5 December 2020 11	Yeni Malatyaspor	1–1	İstanbul Başakşehir	Malatya
16:00 TRT (UTC+3)	Ponck 50' (o.g.); Büyük (yellow card) 57'; Tetteh (yellow card) 82'; Topalli (yellow card) 87'	Report	Gulbrandsen (yellow card) 26'; Kahveci (yellow card) 38'; Giuliano 45+1'	Stadium: Malatya Arena; Attendance: 0 Referee: Cüneyt Çakır

12 December 2020 12	Fenerbahçe	0–3	Yeni Malatyaspor	Istanbul
19:00	Mert Hakan Yandaş (yellow card) 39'; Gökhan Gönül (yellow card) 45'; Luiz Gustavo (yellow card) 89'	Report	9' (pen.) Adem Büyük; 21' Umut Bulut; (yellow card) 45' Karim Hafez; 48' Youssouf Ndayishimiye; (yellow card) 78' Ertaç Özbir	Stadium: Şükrü Saracoğlu Stadium; Attendance: 0 Referee: Erkan Özdamar; Assistant referees: İsmail Şencan, Ali Saygın Ögel; Fourth official: Emre Malok

19 December 2020 13	Yeni Malatyaspor	2–0	Kasımpaşa	Malatya
16:00	Büyük 45+4' (pen.), 56' (pen.); Acquah (yellow card) 64'; Şahan (yellow card) 80'	Report	Kara (yellow card) 45+3'	Stadium: Malatya Arena; Attendance: 0 Referee: Arda Kardeşler; Fourth official: Atilla Karaoğlan

23 December 2020 14	Alanyaspor	1–1	Yeni Malatyaspor	Alanya
16:00	Babacar 32'; Bakasetas (yellow card) 59'; Karaca (yellow card) 82'	Report	Büyük 60'; Acquah (yellow card) 65'; Bulut (yellow card) 83'	Stadium: Bahçeşehir Okulları Stadium; Attendance: 0 Referee: Alper Ulusoy
Note: Played Behind Closed Doors

27 December 2020 15	Yeni Malatyaspor	1–3	BB Erzurumspor	Malatya
16:00	Acquah 62'	Report	Gomes 44'; Donald 67'; Obertan 71'	Stadium: Malatya Arena; Attendance: 0 Referee: Mustafa Öğretmenoğlu; Fourth official: Hakan Ceylan

2 January 2021 16	Ankaragücü	3–1	Yeni Malatyaspor	Ankara
16:00	Łukasik 4'; Paintsil 37' (pen.); Børven 88'	Report	Ndayishimiye 76'; Hafez (red card) 83'	Stadium: Eryaman Stadium; Attendance: 0 Referee: Volkan Bayarslan; Fourth official: Mustafa Kürşad Filiz

5 January 2021 17	Yeni Malatyaspor	2–2	Sivasspor	Malatya
16:00	Fofana 25'; Tetteh 66'	Report	Yeşilyurt 18'; Gradel 32'	Stadium: Malatya Arena; Attendance: 0 Referee: Sarper Baris Saka; Fourth official: Kadir Sağlam

9 January 2021 18	Kayserispor	1–0	Yeni Malatyaspor	Kayseri
16:00	Kaya 10' (o.g.)	Report		Stadium: Kadir Has Stadium; Attendance: 0 Referee: Erkan Özdamar; Fourth official: Cihan Aydın

17 January 2021 19	Yeni Malatyaspor	4–1	Çaykur Rizespor	Malatya
16:00 TRT (UTC+3)	Kanatsızkuş 46', 50'; Bulut 61'; Eskihellaç 74'	Report	Škoda 30' (pen.)	Stadium: Malatya Arena; Attendance: 0 Referee: Hüseyin Göçek

20 January 2021 20	Hatayspor	1–2	Yeni Malatyaspor	Antakya
16:00 TRT (UTC+3)	Sackey (yellow card) 51'; Aabid (yellow card) 61'; Boupendza 87'; Abdioğlu (yellow card) 90+7'; Mert (yellow card) 90+9'	Report	Acquah (yellow card) 39'; Hadebe (yellow card) 45+2'; Yavru 53'; Büyük 77' (pen.) (yellow card) 80'	Stadium: Antakya Atatürk Stadium; Attendance: 0 Referee: Ramazan Keleş; Fourth official: Kadir Sağlam

24 January 2021 21	Yeni Malatyaspor	0–1	Galatasaray	Malatya
16:00 TRT	Tetteh (yellow card) 65'; Chebake (yellow card) 88'; Ahmed (yellow card) 90+1'	Report	Taylan (yellow card) 81'; Babel 88' (yellow card) 90'	Stadium: Malatya Arena; Attendance: 0 Referee: Ali Palabıyık; Assistant referees: Kemal Yılmaz, Erdinç Sezertam; Fourth official: Bülent Birincioğlu

19 January 2021 22	Yeni Malatyaspor	0–0	Fatih Karagümrük	Malatya
16:00	Kubilay Kanatsızkuş (red card) 44'	Report		Stadium: Türk Telekom Stadium; Attendance: 0 Referee: Yasin Kol; Fourth official: Direnç Tonusluoğlu

4 February 2021 23	Göztepe	2–2	Yeni Malatyaspor	Göztepe
16:00	Ndiaye 13', 78'	Report	Mallan 39'; Ildiz 81'	Stadium: Gürsel Aksel Stadium; Attendance: 0 Referee: Turgut Doman; Fourth official: Cihan Aydın

8 February 2021 24	Yeni Malatyaspor	0–2	Trabzonspor	Malatya
19:00	Teenage Hadebe (yellow card) 62'	Report	Anastasios Bakasetas 50'; Vitor Hugo (yellow card) 65'; Berat Özdemir (yellow card) 90+2'; Anthony Nwakaeme 90+5'	Stadium: Malatya Arena; Attendance: 0 Referee: Erkan Özdamar; Assistant referees: İbrahim Çağlar Uyarcan, Mustafa Sönmez; Fourth official: Hakan Ceylan

15 February 2021 25	Antalyaspor	1–1	Yeni Malatyaspor	Antalya
19:00 TRT (UTC+3)	Orgill 5'	Report	Orgill 12' (o.g.)	Stadium: Antalya Stadium; Attendance: 0 Referee: Serkan Tokat

20 February 2021 26	Yeni Malatyaspor	2–3	Konyaspor	Malatya
16:00	Büyük 24', 45+4' (pen.)	Report	Diomandé 72'; Cikalleshi 80', 84'	Stadium: Malatya Arena; Attendance: 0 Referee: Sarper Baris Saka; Fourth official: Bayram Başkan

26 February 2021 27	Gençlerbirliği	1–1	Yeni Malatyaspor	Ankara
16:00 TRT (UTC+3)	Özbir 60' (o.g.); Ayité (yellow card) 36' (yellow-red card) 71'	Report	Kaya (red card) 21'; Tetteh 34'	Stadium: Eryaman Stadium; Attendance: 0 Referee: Alper Ulusoy; Fourth official: Emre Kargın

2 March 2021 28	Yeni Malatyaspor	0–1	Beşiktaş	Malatya
19:00 TRT (UTC+3)	Tetteh (yellow card) 37'; Chebake (yellow card) 68'	Report	Hutchinson 59'	Stadium: Malatya Arena; Attendance: 0 Referee: Halis Özkahya

6 March 2021 29	Denizlispor	3–2	Yeni Malatyaspor	Denizli
16:00		Report		Stadium: Atatürk Stadium

30	BYE

4 April 2021 32	İstanbul Başakşehir	3–1	Yeni Malatyaspor	Istanbul
16:00 TRT (UTC+3)	Ciğerci 26'; Ponck (yellow card) 29'; Duarte (yellow card) 70'; Ba (penalty missed) 79'; Şahiner 87'; Aleksić 90+1'	Report	Chebake (yellow card) 62'; Büyük 71'	Stadium: Başakşehir Fatih Terim Stadium; Attendance: 0 Referee: Yaşar Kemal Uğurlu

8 April 2021 33	Yeni Malatyaspor	1–1	Fenerbahçe	Malatya
19:00 TRT (UTC+3)	Eskihellaç 35'	Report	Valencia 17'	Stadium: Malatya Stadium; Attendance: 0 Referee: Halis Özkahya

42	Galatasaray	v	Yeni Malatyaspor	Istanbul
		Report		Stadium: Türk Telekom Stadium

=== Turkish Cup ===
5 November 2020 Third round	Yeni Malatyaspor	2–0	Artvin Hopaspor	Malatya
18:00 TRT (UTC+3)	Acquah 66'; Topalli 79'	Report		Stadium: Malatya Arena; Attendance: 0 Referee: Direnç Tonusluoğlu

25 November 2020 Fourth round	Yeni Malatyaspor	2–0	Etimesgut Belediyespor	Malatya
13:00 TRT (UTC+3)	Bulut 52'; Tetteh 90+4'	Report		Stadium: Malatya Arena; Attendance: 0 Referee: Onur Özütoprak

15 December 2020 Fifth round	Yeni Malatyaspor	5–0	Hekimoğlu Trabzon	Malatya
17:00 TRT (UTC+3)	Topalli 4', 39'; Yavru 47'; Akdeniz 74' (o.g.); Emeksiz 84'	Report		Stadium: Malatya Arena; Attendance: 0 Referee: Burak Pakkan

12 January 2021 Round of 16	Yeni Malatyaspor	1–1 (a.e.t.) (6–7 p)	Galatasaray	Malatya
20:45 TRT (UTC+3)	Hadebe (yellow card) 90'; Umut 102'; Chebake (yellow card) 119'	Report	Luyindama 120'	Stadium: Malatya Arena; Attendance: 0 Referee: Özgür Yankaya
	Penalties
	Ildız (penalty scored); Lukoki (penalty scored); Chebake (penalty scored); Eskihellaç (penalty missed); Ndayishimiye (penalty scored); Wallace (penalty scored); Akça (penalty scored); Topalli (penalty missed)		(penalty scored) Antalyalı; (penalty scored) Bayram; (penalty scored) Çağlayan; (penalty scored) Diagne; (penalty missed) Aktürkoğlu; (penalty scored) Marcão; (penalty scored) Etebo; (penalty scored) Kılınç
