= Pierre-Yves Polomat =

French footballer (born 1993)

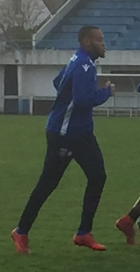
- Pierre-Yves Polomat in 2018

Personal information
- Full name: Pierre-Yves Nicolas Polomat
- Date of birth: 27 December 1993 (age 32)
- Place of birth: Fort-de-France, Martinique, France
- Height: 1.80 m (5 ft 11 in)
- Position: Left-back

Youth career
- 2008–2010: Marseille
- 2010–2012: Saint-Étienne

Senior career*
Years	Team	Apps	(Gls)
2011–2015	Saint-Étienne B	54	(2)
2012–2019	Saint-Étienne	44	(0)
2014	→ Châteauroux (loan)	3	(0)
2014	→ Châteauroux B (loan)	1	(0)
2014–2015	→ Laval B (loan)	9	(1)
2014–2015	→ Laval (loan)	17	(0)
2017–2018	→ Auxerre (loan)	28	(1)
2019–2021	Gençlerbirliği	52	(0)
2022–2023	Versailles	18	(0)

International career
2013	France U20	2	(0)
Medal record
Representing France
Men's football
FIFA U-20 World Cup
Winner	2013 Turkey
- * Club domestic league appearances and goals as of 17:29, 3 October 2023 (UTC)

Pierre-Yves Nicolas Polomat (born 27 December 1993) is a French professional footballer who plays as a left-back, currently without a club.

== Club career ==
Polomat moved to France in 2008 to join the academy of Marseille, which he left two years later, following off-the-field problems. He subsequently joined Saint-Étienne in 2010, following a successful two-week trial. He made his debut in a 3–0 win against Lorient in the Coupe de la Ligue on 26 September 2012. A regular in the reserves, Polomat joined Châteauroux on loan on 31 January 2014 to gain first-team experience. He was ruled out for two months after heavily spraining his ankle in his first game for the club.

The following season, he was once again loaned out to Ligue 2, this time to Laval.

On 23 July 2017, Polomat joined another Ligue 2 club, signing on loan with Auxerre. In March during a match against Quevilly Rouen, Polomat was sent off for fighting with teammate Mickëal Barreto. He was given a six-match ban by the LFP Disciplinary Commission.

On 25 June 2019, Turkish Süper Lig club Gençlerbirliği announced the signing of Polomat on a free transfer.

After a year without a club, Polomat returned to France joining Ligue 2 side Versailles, on a free transfer.

== International career ==
Polomat was a member of the France under-20 squad that won the 2013 FIFA U-20 World Cup. He made two substitute appearances during the tournament, including a brief cameo in the final against Uruguay.

== Career statistics ==
=== Club ===
As of match played 2 October 2023

Appearances and goals by club, season and competition
Club	Season	League			National Cup		League Cup		Europe (Note: Appearances in UEFA Europa League)		Total	
Club	Season	Division	Apps	Goals	Apps	Goals	Apps	Goals	Apps	Goals	Apps	Goals
Saint–Étienne II	2010–11	National 2	7	0	—		—		—		7	0
Saint–Étienne II	2011–12	National 2	17	0	—		—		—		17	0
Saint–Étienne II	2012–13	National 2	12	0	—		—		—		12	0
Saint–Étienne II	2013–14	National 3	7	0	—		—		—		7	0
Saint–Étienne II	2015–16	National 3	6	2	—		—		—		6	2
Saint–Étienne II	2016–17	National 3	2	0	—		—		—		2	0
Saint–Étienne II	2018–19	National 2	3	0	—		—		—		3	0
Saint–Étienne II	Total		54	2	0	0	0	0	0	0	54	2
Saint–Étienne	2012–13	Ligue 1	0	0	2	0	1	0	0	0	3	0
Saint–Étienne	2013–14	Ligue 1	0	0	1	0	0	0	0	0	1	0
Saint–Étienne	2015–16	Ligue 1	15	0	0	0	1	0	5	0	21	0
Saint–Étienne	2016–17	Ligue 1	11	0	2	0	1	0	5	0	19	0
Saint–Étienne	2018–19	Ligue 1	18	0	2	0	1	0	0	0	21	0
Saint–Étienne	Total		44	0	7	0	4	0	10	0	65	0
Châteauroux (loan)	2013–14	Ligue 2	3	0	0	0	0	0	—		3	0
Châteauroux II (loan)	2013–14	National 3	1	0	—		—		—		1	0
Laval (loan)	2014–15	Ligue 2	17	0	0	0	0	0	—		17	0
Laval II (loan)	2014–15	National 3	9	1	—		—		—		9	1
Auxerre (loan)	2017–18	Ligue 2	28	1	4	1	0	0	—		32	2
Gençlerbirliği	2019–20	Süper Lig	19	0	0	0	—		0	0	19	0
Gençlerbirliği	2020–21	Süper Lig	33	0	0	0	—		0	0	33	0
Gençlerbirliği	Total		52	0	0	0	0	0	0	0	52	0
Versailles	2022–23	National 1	18	0	0	0	0	0	—		18	0
Career total			226	4	11	1	4	0	10	0	251	5

== Honours ==
=== International ===
- FIFA U-20 World Cup: 2013
