= Jetmir Topalli =

Kosovan footballer (born 1998)

Personal information
- Date of birth: 7 February 1998 (age 28)
- Place of birth: Kaçanik, FR Yugoslavia
- Height: 1.88 m (6 ft 2 in)
- Position: Forward

Team information
- Current team: Ballkani
- Number: 98

Youth career
- –2010: New Star Football School
- 2010–2013: Besëlidhja Prishtinë
- 2013–2014: Galatasaray Kosova Football School
- 2014–2017: 2 Korriku

Senior career*
Years	Team	Apps	(Gls)
2017–2018	2 Korriku		
2018	Vushtrria		
2018–2020	Ballkani	59	(17)
2019	→ Feronikeli (loan)	0	(0)
2020–2021	Yeni Malatyaspor	13	(1)
2021–2025	İstanbulspor	56	(14)
2023–2024	→ Manisa (loan)	30	(5)
2024–2025	→ Pendikspor (loan)	31	(2)
2025–2026	Bandırmaspor	14	(0)
2026	→ Serikspor (loan)	13	(5)
2026–	Ballkani	5	(0)

International career^{‡}
2020–	Kosovo	3	(0)
- * Club domestic league appearances and goals as of 19 October 2026 ‡ National team caps and goals as of 23:21, 5 August 2022 (UTC)

Jetmir Topalli (born 7 February 1998) is a Kosovan professional footballer who plays as a forward for Football Superleague of Kosovo club Ballkani and the Kosovo national team.

== Club career ==
=== Ballkani ===
On 13 June 2018, Topalli signed a two-year contract with Kosovo Superleague club Ballkani. On 25 August 2018, he made his debut in a 3–0 home defeat against Llapi after being named in the starting line-up.

==== Loan at Feronikeli ====
On 13 June 2019, Topalli joined in a short-time loan with Kosovo Superleague club Feronikeli, only for European competition matches. Twelve days later, he was named as a Feronikeli substitute for the first time in the 2019–20 UEFA Champions League preliminary round semi-final against the Gibraltarian side Lincoln Red Imps. His debut with Feronikeli came on 28 June in the 2019–20 UEFA Champions League preliminary round final against the Andorran side Santa Coloma after coming on as a substitute at 67th minute in place of Jean Carioca.

=== Yeni Malatyaspor ===
On 13 August 2020, Topalli signed a three-year contract with Süper Lig club Yeni Malatyaspor, and received squad number 98. On 12 September 2020, he made his debut in a 3–0 away defeat against Fatih Karagümrük after coming on as a substitute at 81st minute in place of Umut Bulut.

=== İstanbulspor ===
On 31 August 2021, Topalli signed a five-year contract with TFF First League club İstanbulspor.

=== Manisa ===
On August 30, 2023, he signed with TFF First League club Manisa.

== International career ==
On 24 December 2019, Topalli received a call-up from Kosovo for the friendly match against Sweden, and made his debut after coming on as a substitute at 46th minute in place of Flamur Kastrati.

== Career statistics ==
=== Club ===
As of match played 13 November 2022

Appearances and goals by club, season and competition
Club	Season	League			Cup		Continental (Note: Including continental competitions, such as UEFA Champions League and UEFA Europa League)		Total	
Club	Season	Division	Apps	Goals	Apps	Goals	Apps	Goals	Apps	Goals
Ballkani	2018–19	Kosovo Superleague	29	10	0	0	—		29	10
Ballkani	2019–20	Kosovo Superleague	30	7	4	0	4 (Note: Played with Feronikeli in a short-time loan)	0	34	7
Ballkani	Total		59	17	4	0	4	0	63	17
Yeni Malatyaspor	2020–21	Süper Lig	13	1	4	3	—		17	4
İstanbulspor	2021–22	TFF First League	30	9	1	0	—		31	9
İstanbulspor	2022–23	Süper Lig	13	4	1	1	—		14	5
İstanbulspor	Total		43	13	2	1	—		45	14
Career total			115	31	10	4	4	0	129	35

=== International ===
As of 7 December 2022

Appearances and goals by national team and year
National team	Year	Apps	Goals
Kosovo	2020	1	0
Kosovo	2021	2	0
Kosovo	2022	2	0
Total		5	0
