= Teenage Hadebe =

Zimbabwean footballer (born 1995)

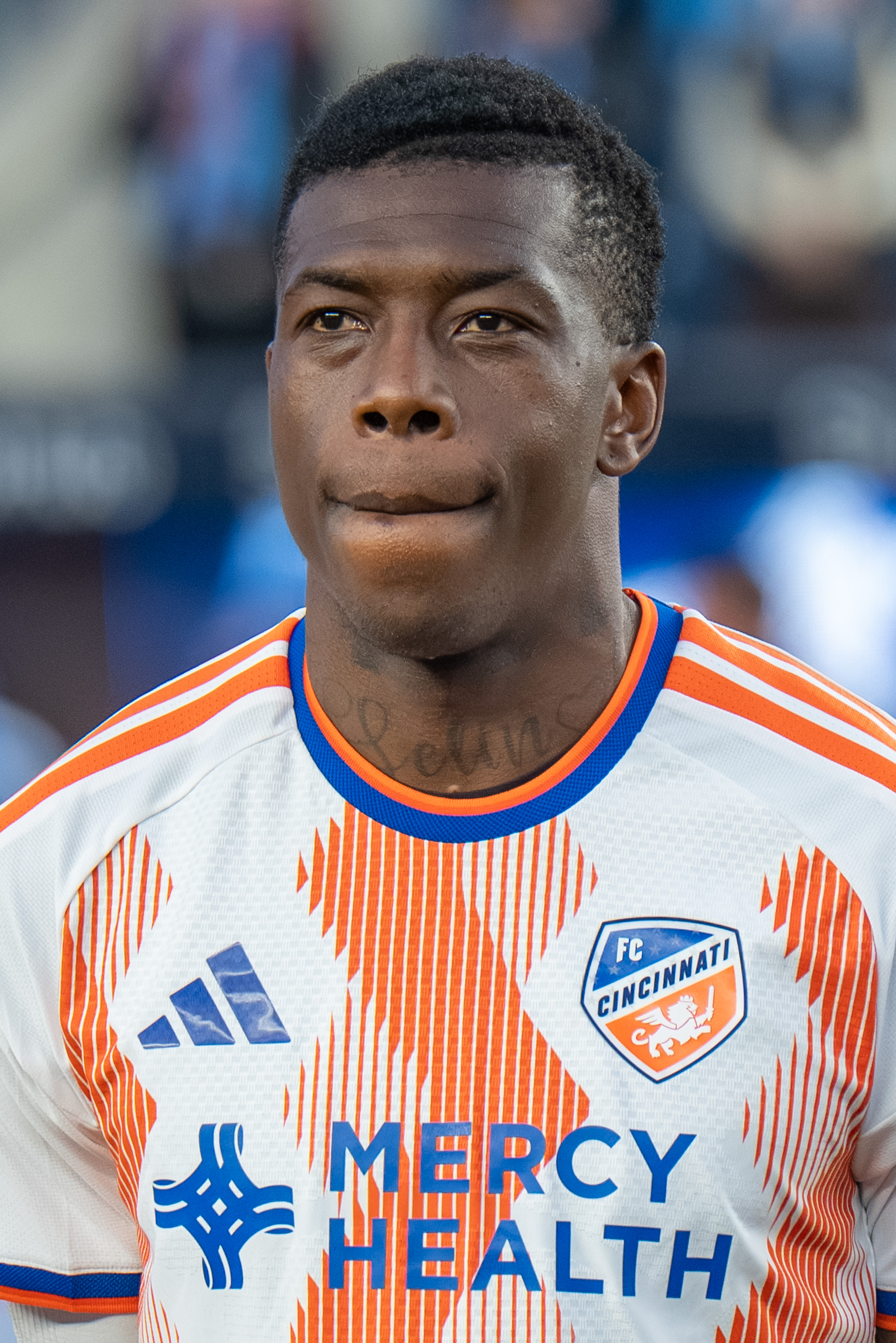
- Hadebe with FC Cincinnati in 2026

Personal information
- Full name: Teenage Lingani Hadebe
- Date of birth: 17 September 1995 (age 31)
- Place of birth: Bulawayo, Zimbabwe
- Height: 1.88 m (6 ft 2 in)
- Position: Defender

Team information
- Current team: FC Cincinnati
- Number: 16

Senior career*
Years	Team	Apps	(Gls)
2012–2015	Bantu	43	(4)
2015	→ Highlanders (loan)	22	(1)
2016–2017	Chicken Inn		
2017–2019	Kaizer Chiefs	26	(1)
2019–2021	Yeni Malatyaspor	53	(2)
2021–2023	Houston Dynamo	51	(3)
2023	Houston Dynamo 2	2	(0)
2024	Konyaspor	11	(0)
2024–	FC Cincinnati	42	(1)

International career^{‡}
2014–	Zimbabwe	34	(2)
- * Club domestic league appearances and goals as of 18:06, 22 October 2026 (UTC) ‡ National team caps and goals as of match played 14 October 2024

Teenage Lingani Hadebe (born 17 September 1995) is a Zimbabwean professional footballer who plays as a defender for Major League Soccer club FC Cincinnati. He also plays for the Zimbabwe national team.

== Club career ==
=== Early career ===
Hadebe started his career with Bantu Rovers, making his debut as a 17-year-old in 2012. He played the 2012 and 2013 seasons with Bantu in Division One while playing the 2014 season in the Zimbabwe Premier Soccer League. Bantu Rovers were relegated from the PSL in 2014, so Hadebe joined top-flight side Highlanders in 2015 on a season-long loan. After Hadebe helped Highlanders finish 6th on the table, he joined 2015 PSL champions Chicken Inn in January 2016. Hadebe helped Chicken Inn win the Zimbabwean Independence Trophy, defeating Highlanders in the final. All three Zimbabwean clubs Hadebe played for were located in his hometown of Bulawayo.

=== Kaizer Chiefs ===
In July 2017, Hadebe signed for South African Premier Division side Kaizer Chiefs. He had previously been on trial for Kaizer Chiefs in August 2016. Hadebe missed the first three months of the season after suffering an ankle injury in pre-season. He made his Kaizer Chiefs debut on 22 November 2017 in a 0–0 draw with AmaZulu. On 4 April 2018, Hadebe scored in the 90+5th minute, his first goal for the club, to give Amakhosi a 1–0 away win over Free State Stars. He ended the season with one goal in 13 league appearances, helping Kaizer Chiefs finish third in the Premier Division.

After missing the start of the 2018–19 season due to an ankle injury, Hadebe made his first appearance of the season on 1 September in a 1–0 loss to SuperSport United in the second leg of the MTN 8 semifinals, with SuperSport winning 3–2 on aggregate. He made 13 appearances during league play as Amakhosi finished ninth in the table. Hadebe made five appearances in the Nedbank Cup as Kaizer Chiefs finished runners-up, losing to second-tier side TS Galaxy in the final 1–0.

=== Yeni Malatyaspor ===
On 14 July 2019, Hadebe was sold to Turkish Süper Lig side Yeni Malatyaspor for an undisclosed fee. He made his debut for Yeni Malatyaspor on 25 July in a 2–2 draw with Olimpija Ljubljana in a Europa League qualifying match. Hadebe made his Süper Lig debut on 18 August, picking up an assist in a 3–0 win over İstanbul Başakşehir. In November 2019, Hadebe was temporarily prevented from returning to Turkey following the international break due to passport issues, causing him to miss two matches with Yeni Malatyaspor. On 1 March 2020, he was shown a red card for a dangerous foul in a 2–0 loss to Denizlispor. He missed the next three matches due to the subsequent suspension. Following his suspension, the season was paused due to the COVID-19 pandemic, with play resuming in June. Hadebe finished the season with 23 appearances and one assist in league play as Yeni Malatyaspor finished 16th in the table. Despite the team's poor season, Hadebe enjoyed a successful campaign, being named to the Süper Lig Team of the Season.

After missing the first game of the 2020–21 season due to injury, Hadebe made his season debut on 18 September 2020, coming off the bench in a 1–1 draw with Göztepe S.K. in matchweek 2. On 17 April, Hadebe scored his first goal for Yeni Malatyaspor in a 1–0 win against Alanyaspor. He finished the season with two goals and one assist from 30 appearances as they finished 15th in the table. He was named to the Süper Lig Team of the Week five times during the season.

=== Houston Dynamo ===
On 28 June 2021, Hadebe signed with Major League Soccer side Houston Dynamo as a Designated Player. He made his Dynamo debut on 20 July against the Vancouver Whitecaps, starting alongside fellow centerback Tim Parker and keeping a clean sheet in a 0–0 draw. He recorded his first assist on 11 September in a 3–0 win over Austin FC. After starting in 17 consecutive matches, Hadebe missed the final four of the season due to an ankle injury. He ended the season with 17 appearances and one assist, while also being named Dynamo Defender of the Year and Newcomer of the Year. Despite a good season from Hadebe, the Dynamo finished in last place (13th) in the Western Conference, failing to qualify for the playoffs.

On 12 March 2022, Hadebe made his first appearance of the season, coming on as a late substitute in a 2–1 win against the Colorado Rapids in matchweek 4. He scored his first goal for the Dynamo on 9 April to help Houston to a 4–3 win over the San Jose Earthquakes. On 9 July, Hadebe scored in the 11th minute of stoppage time to rescue a late draw against Texas Derby rival FC Dallas, the latest non-penalty goal in MLS regular season history. Hadebe was named to the MLS Team of the Week following the match. He missed six games in the fall due to a left leg injury. Hadebe ended the season with two goals in 27 regular season appearances, four starts, as Houston finished 13th out of 14 in the West, missing out on the playoffs again.

=== Konyaspor ===
On 9 February 2024, Hadebe signed a contract with Konyaspor in Turkey until the end of the season.

=== Cincinnati ===
On 27 August 2024, Hadebe returned to Major League Soccer by signing for Cincinnati.

== International career ==
Habede made his debut for the Zimbabwe national team on 16 November 2014, playing the full 90 minutes in a 2–1 loss to Morocco in a friendly. On 31 May 2016, he scored his first two goals for the national team to give Zimbabwe a 2–0 win over Uganda. On 4 January 2017, Hadebe was included in Callisto Pasuwa's squad for the 2017 Africa Cup of Nations, however, Hadebe would not appear during the tournament. He was named to Zimbabwe's 2019 Africa Cup of Nations squad by head coach Sunday Chidzambwa on 10 June 2019. Hadebe played every minute of Zimbabwe's three group stage games as they finished 4th in Group A.

On 29 December 2021, Hadebe was included by head coach Norman Mapeza for the Zimbabwe 2021 Africa Cup of Nations squad. He started the first 2 games of the group stage, but did not appear in the third match with Zimbabwe already eliminated.

On 11 December 2025, Hadebe was called up to the Zimbabwe squad for the 2025 Africa Cup of Nations.

== Personal life ==
Hadebe and his wife Mitchell Matambanashe met each other in 2012 while in school. Together, they have two sons and one daughter.

== Career statistics ==
=== Club ===
As of match played 21 October 2026

Appearances and goals by club, season and competition
Club	Season	League			Playoffs		National cup (Note: Includes the Nedbank Cup, Turkish Cup, and U.S. Open Cup)		Continental		Other		Total	
Club	Season	Division	Apps	Goals	Apps	Goals	Apps	Goals	Apps	Goals	Apps	Goals	Apps	Goals
Kaizer Chiefs	2017–18	Premier Division	13	1	—		3	0	—		—		16	1
Kaizer Chiefs	2018–19	Premier Division	13	0	—		5	0	4 (Note: Appearances in CAF Confederation Cup)	0	1 (Note: Appearance in MTN 8)	0	23	0
Kaizer Chiefs	Total		26	1	—		8	0	4	0	1	0	39	1
Yeni Malatyaspor	2019–20	Süper Lig	23	0	—		4	0	1 (Note: Appearance in UEFA Europa League)	0	—		28	0
Yeni Malatyaspor	2020–21	Süper Lig	30	2	—		2	0	—		—		32	2
Yeni Malatyaspor	Total		53	2	—		6	0	1	0	—		60	2
Houston Dynamo	2021	MLS	17	0	—		—		—		—		17	0
Houston Dynamo	2022	MLS	22	2	—		1	0	—		—		23	2
Houston Dynamo	2023	MLS	12	1	2	0	2	0	—		—		16	0
Houston Dynamo	Total		51	3	2	0	3	0	—		—		56	2
Houston Dynamo 2	2023	MLS Next Pro	2	0	—		—		—		—		2	0
Konyaspor	2023–24	SüperLig	11	0	—		1	0	—		—		12	0
FC Cincinnati	2024	MLS	4	0	3	0	—		—		—		7	0
FC Cincinnati	2025	MLS	20	0	4	0	—		4 (Note: Appearances in CONCACAF Champions Cup)	0	3 (Note: Appearances in Leagues Cup)	0	31	0
FC Cincinnati	2026	MLS	18	1	—		—		2	0	1	0	21	1
FC Cincinnati	Total		42	1	7	0	—		6	0	4	0	59	1
Career total			185	7	9	0	18	0	11	0	5	0	220	6

=== International ===
As of 17 February 2023

Appearances and goals by national team and year
National team	Year	Apps	Goals
Zimbabwe	2014	1	0
Zimbabwe	2015	3	0
Zimbabwe	2016	7	4
Zimbabwe	2017	1	0
Zimbabwe	2018	5	0
Zimbabwe	2019	9	0
Zimbabwe	2020	3	0
Zimbabwe	2021	3	0
Zimbabwe	2022	3	0
Total		35	4

As of 9 November 2021
Scores and results list Zimbabwe's goal tally first, score column indicates score after each Hadebe goal.

List of international goals scored by Teenage Hadebe
No.	Date	Venue	Opponent	Score	Result	Competition
1	31 May 2016	Rufaro Stadium, Harare, Zimbabwe	Uganda	1–0	2–0	Friendly
2	31 May 2016	Rufaro Stadium, Harare, Zimbabwe	Uganda	2–0	2–0	Friendly
3	15 June 2016	Sam Nujoma Stadium, Windhoek, Namibia	Seychelles	4–0	5–0	2016 COSAFA Cup
4	5 November 2016	National Sports Stadium, Harare, Zimbabwe	Zambia	1–0	1–0	Friendly

== Honours ==
Chicken Inn

- Zimbabwean Independence Trophy: 2016

Houston Dynamo

- U.S. Open Cup: 2023

Individual

- Süper Lig Team of the Season: 2019–20
- Dynamo Defender of the Year: 2021
- Dynamo Newcomer of the Year: 2021
