= Murat Akşit =

Turkish footballer (born 2002)

Personal information
- Date of birth: 2 January 2002 (age 24)
- Place of birth: Istanbul, Turkey
- Height: 1.86 m (6 ft 1 in)
- Position: Goalkeeper

Team information
- Current team: Kahramanmaraş İstiklalspor
- Number: 1

Youth career
- 2014–2015: Dolayoba Dumlupinarspor
- 2015–2018: Yeni Malatyaspor

Senior career*
Years	Team	Apps	(Gls)
2018–2019	Pendikspor	1	(0)
2019–2022	Yeni Malatyaspor	1	(0)
2022–2025	Pendikspor	0	(0)
2024–2025	→ Kahramanmaraş İstiklalspor (loan)	0	(0)
2025–	Kahramanmaraş İstiklalspor	0	(0)

International career^{‡}
2019	Turkey U17	7	(0)
2019–2020	Turkey U18	4	(0)
- * Club domestic league appearances and goals as of 9 November 2025 ‡ National team caps and goals as of 03:46, 22 May 2022 (UTC)

Murat Akşit (born 2 January 2002) is a Turkish footballer who plays as a goalkeeper for TFF 2. Lig club Kahramanmaraş İstiklalspor.

== Career ==
Akşit is a youth product of Dolayoba Dumlupinarspor and Pendikspor, and made one appearance for Pendikspor in the TFF Second League at the age of 17. He transferred to Yeni Malatyaspor on 10 July 2019. He made his professional debut with them in a 3–1 Süper Lig loss to Çaykur Rizespor on 8 May 2022.

== International career ==
Akşit is a youth international for Turkey, having played for the Turkey U17s and U18s.
