= Baiano (footballer, born 1992) =

Brazilian footballer

Fabrício Baiano
Personal information
- Full name: Fabrício Santos de Jesus
- Date of birth: 13 June 1992 (age 34)
- Place of birth: Camacan, Brazil
- Height: 1.78 m (5 ft 10 in)
- Position: Defensive midfielder

Youth career
- 2007–2012: Vasco da Gama

Senior career*
Years	Team	Apps	(Gls)
2013	Vasco da Gama	1	(0)
2014	Novo Hamburgo	0	(0)
2015–2017	Coritiba	5	(0)
2016	→ Macaé (loan)	10	(0)
2017–2020	Marítimo	36	(0)
2019–2020	→ Gençlerbirliği (loan)	25	(0)
2020–2022	Çaykur Rizespor	56	(1)
2022–2024	Fortaleza	5	(0)
2023	→ Avaí (loan)	0	(0)
2023	→ Londrina (loan)	10	(0)
2024	Sagamihara	6	(0)
2024–2025	Petrolul Ploieşti	7	(0)
Total		161	(1)
- * Club domestic league appearances and goals

Fabrício Santos de Jesus (born 13 June 1992), known as Fabrício Baiano or Baiano, is a former Brazilian professional footballer who played as a defensive midfielder.

== Birth adulteration ==
In March 2012, Baiano confessed that he had misrepresented his real age. At that moment, Fabrício dos Santos de Jesus, born 13 June 1992, was commonly known as Heitor Bispo dos Santos, born 7 March 1996. Baiano had adultered his age in March 2007 to gain more chances in football, joining Vasco da Gama as a youth player a year later.

== Honours ==
Coritiba

- Campeonato Paranaense: 2017
