= Sakıb Aytaç =

Turkish footballer (born 1991)

Personal information
- Date of birth: 24 November 1991 (age 34)
- Place of birth: İzmir, Turkey
- Height: 1.87 m (6 ft 2 in)
- Position: Defender

Team information
- Current team: Kastamonuspor
- Number: 5

Senior career*
| Years | Team | Apps | (Gls) |
| 2008–2011 | Çanakkale Dardanelspor | 48 | (2) |
| 2011–2014 | Gençlerbirliği | 0 | (0) |
| 2011–2012 | → Denizlispor (loan) | 0 | (0) |
| 2012–2014 | → TKİ Tavşanlı Linyitspor (loan) | 47 | (0) |
| 2015–2018 | Antalyaspor | 108 | (4) |
| 2018–2019 | Kayserispor | 3 | (0) |
| 2019–2020 | Yeni Malatyaspor | 22 | (0) |
| 2020–2021 | Denizlispor | 17 | (1) |
| 2021–2022 | Kasımpaşa | 8 | (0) |
| 2022–2025 | Esenler Erokspor | 80 | (1) |
| 2025– | Kastamonuspor | 10 | (0) |

International career^{‡}
| 2009 | Turkey U19 | 2 | (0) |
| 2010–2011 | Turkey U21 | 5 | (0) |
- * Club domestic league appearances and goals as of 30 November 2025 ‡ National team caps and goals as of 2 September 2011

Sakıb Aytaç (born 24 November 1991) is a Turkish footballer who plays for TFF 2. Lig club Kastamonuspor.

== Club career ==
On 1 July 2018, after finishing his contract with Antalyaspor, he joined Kayserispor.
