= Kubilay Kanatsızkuş =

Turkish footballer

Personal information
- Date of birth: 28 March 1997 (age 29)
- Place of birth: Osmangazi, Bursa, Turkey
- Height: 1.90 m (6 ft 3 in)
- Position: Forward

Team information
- Current team: Esenler Erokspor
- Number: 9

Youth career
- 2007–2008: Nilüfer Gençlerbirliği
- 2008–2016: Bursaspor

Senior career*
Years	Team	Apps	(Gls)
2016–2020	Bursaspor	80	(15)
2018–2019	→ Ankaragücü (loan)	10	(1)
2020–2022	Yeni Malatyaspor	42	(6)
2022–2023	Çaykur Rizespor	36	(4)
2023–2025	Göztepe	48	(7)
2025–2026	Kasımpaşa	21	(1)
2026–	Esenler Erokspor	6	(0)

International career^{‡}
2016	Turkey U19	2	(1)
2018	Turkey U20	5	(2)
2016–2018	Turkey U21	11	(4)
- * Club domestic league appearances and goals as of 15 October 2026 ‡ National team caps and goals as of 11 September 2018

Kubilay Kanatsızkuş (born 28 March 1997) is a Turkish footballer who plays as a forward for TFF 1. Lig club Esenler Erokspor.

== Professional career ==
A long-time youth product of Bursaspor, Kubilay made his first professional appearance in a 2-0 Süper Lig loss to Gençlerbirliği S.K. on 13 February 2016, at the age of 17.

On 31 August 2018 he has joined Ankaragücü with a one-year loan deal. After a half year on loan, his loan contract has been terminated and he returned to Bursaspor.

== International career ==
He has represented the Turkish Football Federation at the U19 and U21 levels.

== Career statistics ==
=== Club ===
As of match played 31 August 2024

Appearances and goals by club, season and competition
Club	Season	League			Turkish Cup		Total	
Club	Season	Division	Apps	Goals	Apps	Goals	Apps	Goals
Bursaspor	2015-16	Süper Lig	4	2	3	2	7	4
Bursaspor	2016-17	Süper Lig	29	6	5	1	34	7
Bursaspor	2017-18	Süper Lig	8	0	3	0	11	0
Bursaspor	2018-19	Süper Lig	5	0	0	0	5	0
Bursaspor	2019-20	TFF First League	34	7	0	0	34	7
Bursaspor	2020-21	TFF First League	0	0	0	0	0	0
Bursaspor	Total		80	15	11	3	91	18
Ankaragücü (loan)	2018-19	Süper Lig	10	1	1	0	11	1
Yeni Malatyaspor	2020-21	Süper Lig	29	5	1	0	30	5
Yeni Malatyaspor	2021-22	Süper Lig	13	1	2	0	15	1
Yeni Malatyaspor	Total		42	6	3	0	45	6
Çaykur Rizespor	2021-22	Süper Lig	6	0	0	0	6	0
Çaykur Rizespor	2022-23	TFF First League	30	4	2	1	32	5
Çaykur Rizespor	Total		36	4	2	1	38	5
Göztepe	2023-24	TFF First League	30	3	2	1	32	4
Göztepe	2024-25	Süper Lig	4	0	0	0	4	0
Göztepe	Total		34	3	2	1	36	4
Career total			204	30	19	5	223	35
