= Giovanni Sio =

Ivorian footballer (born 1989)

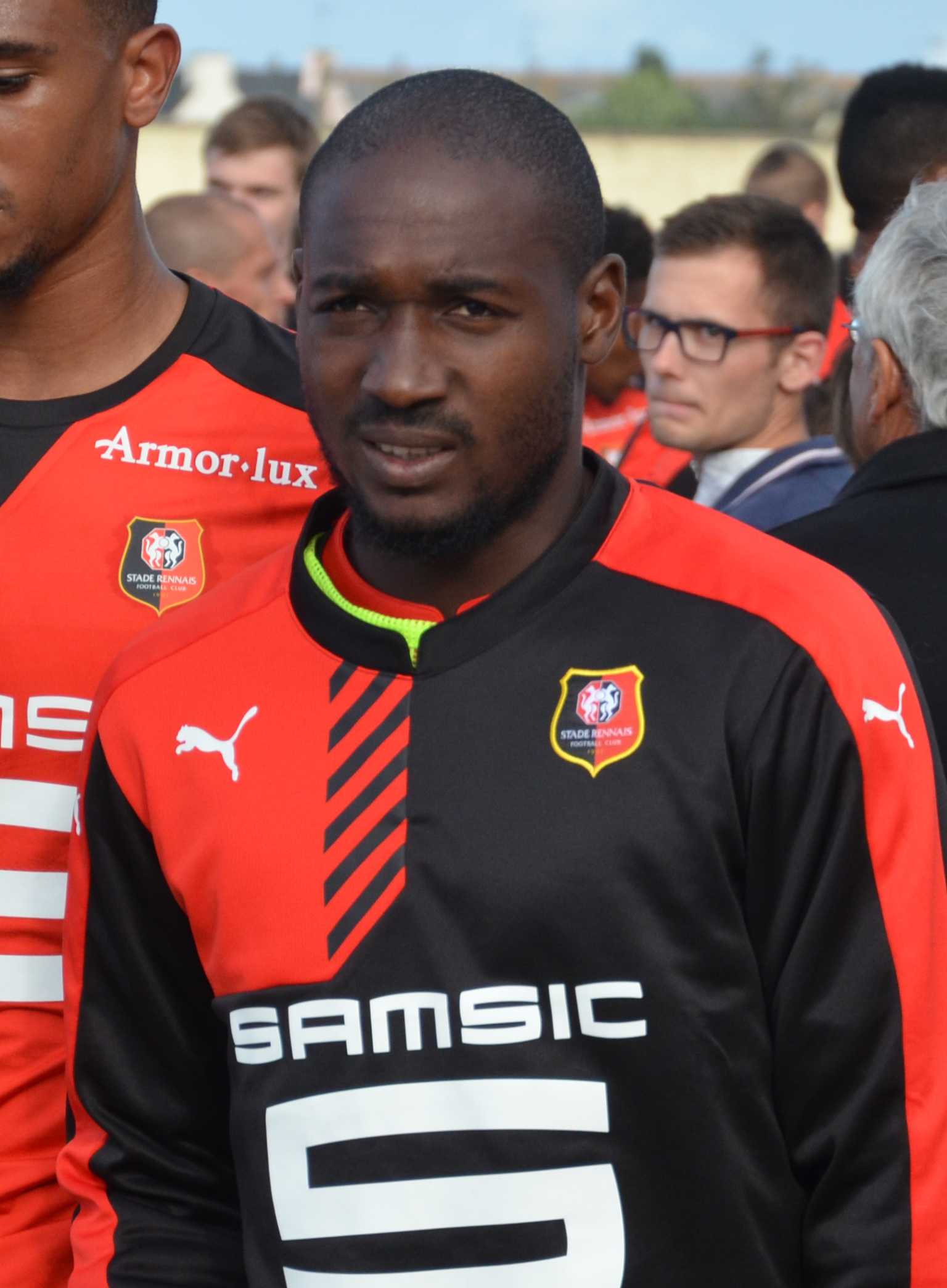
- Sio with Rennes in 2015

Personal information
- Full name: Giovanni-Guy Yann Sio
- Date of birth: 31 March 1989 (age 37)
- Place of birth: Saint-Sébastien-sur-Loire, France
- Height: 1.80 m (5 ft 11 in)
- Position: Forward

Youth career
- 1998–2007: Nantes

Senior career*
Years	Team	Apps	(Gls)
2007–2009	Real Sociedad B	37	(0)
2008–2009	Real Sociedad	2	(0)
2009–2010	Sion II	22	(21)
2010–2012	Sion	48	(17)
2012–2013	VfL Wolfsburg	10	(0)
2012–2013	→ FC Augsburg (loan)	6	(0)
2013	→ Sochaux (loan)	13	(4)
2013–2015	Basel	30	(10)
2015	→ Bastia (loan)	13	(5)
2015–2017	Rennes	68	(16)
2017–2019	Montpellier	34	(10)
2018–2019	→ Al-Ittihad (loan)	21	(7)
2019–2021	Gençlerbirliği	50	(12)
2021–2023	Sion	36	(10)
2023	Ratchaburi	9	(3)
2025–2026	Vertou	8	(1)

International career^{‡}
2002–2003	France U16	14	(0)
2004–2005	France U17	9	(0)
2006–2007	France U18	15	(1)
2013–2018	Ivory Coast	25	(3)
- * Club domestic league appearances and goals as of 24 January 2026 ‡ National team caps and goals as of 24 March 2018

Giovanni-Guy Yann Sio (born 31 March 1989) is a former professional footballer who played as a forward. Born in France, he played for France national teams at youth level before switching to the Ivory Coast at senior level.

== Career ==
Born in Saint-Sébastien-sur-Loire, Sio began his career with Nantes and joined Real Sociedad B in the summer of 2007, after Nantes released him. In the summer of 2008, he was promoted to the Segunda División team. Sio signed a two-year deal with an option for a third year.

On 2 September 2009, Swiss club Sion signed the French forward from Real Sociedad. On 29 May 2011 Sio scored the first goal as Sion defeated Neuchâtel Xamax FCS 2-0 in the Swiss Cup Final.

In January 2012, he joined VfL Wolfsburg for a fee reported as €5 million, signing a four-year deal, keeping him until 2016. He was sent to FC Augsburg on 10 July 2012 on loan, until the end of the 2012–13 campaign. The loan was ended prematurely on 31 January 2013.

On 16 August 2013, it was announced that Sio had joined Basel on a four-year contract. Basel joined the 2013–14 Champions League in the qualifying rounds and Sio played his debut for his new club as they played an away game in the play-off round on 21 August. He scored his first goal with the team in the same game as Basel won 4–2 against Ludogorets Razgrad. Sio played his domestic league debut three days later in the away game in the Swissporarena. He scored his first league goal in the same game as Basel played a 1–1 draw with Luzern. At the end of the 2013–14 Super League season Sio won the league championship with Basel. The team also reached the final of the 2013–14 Swiss Cup, but were beaten 2–0 by Zürich after extra time. Basel advanced to the Champions League group stage and finished in third place in the group table. Thus they qualified for Europa League knockout phase and here they advanced as far as the quarter-finals. But here they were eventually beaten by Valencia 5-3 on aggregate, after extra time.

For Basel's 2014–15 season Paulo Sousa was appointed as new head coach and it was a very successful season for the team. However, it was difficult season for Sio under the new head coach. Despite the fact that Basel won the championship later that season for the sixth time in a row and that Basel had entered the Champions League in the group stage reaching the knockout phase on 9 December 2014, as they managed a 1–1 draw at Anfield against Liverpool, Sio totaled just 16 appearances during the first half of the season, 7 (of 18) League, 2 (of 3) in the Cup and just 1 (of 6) in the Champions League, as well 6 further appearances in test games. Because Sousa did not rely upon Sio as a regular player, during February 2015, the club loaned Sio out to Ligue 1 team SC Bastia until the end of the season.

After his loan period Sio did not return to Basel. During his time with the club, Sio played a total of 59 games for Basel scoring a total of 16 goals. 30 of these games were in the Swiss Super League, five in the Swiss Cup, 13 in the UEFA competitions (Champions League and Europa League) and 11 were friendly games. He scored 10 goals in the domestic league, two in the cup, two in the European games and the other two were scored during the test games.

On 29 June 2015 the Basel announced that Sio was moving on to Rennes.

On 29 September 2018, Sio was loaned to Al-Ittihad Kalba SC with an €1.6m option to buy.

In November 2021 it was announced that Sio had signed for Sion.

== International career ==
Sio was born and raised in France to Ivorian parents. He is also a former member of the France national youth football team, representing his country at U-15, U-16 and U-17. He was also called up to the Ivory Coast U-20 squad for the 2010 Toulon Tournament. He had his first call-up to the Ivory Coast national team in 2013, in a 2014 World Cup qualifying match against the Gambia. He represented the team at the 2014 World Cup.

== Career statistics ==
=== Club ===
As of match played on 4 October 2020

Appearances and goals by club, season and competition
Club	Season	League			National cup		League cup		Continental		Total	
Club	Season	Division	Apps	Goals	Apps	Goals	Apps	Goals	Apps	Goals	Apps	Goals
Real Sociedad	2008–09	Segunda División	2	0	0	0	—		0	0	2	0
Sion	2010–11	Swiss Super League	30	10	4	3	—		0	0	34	13
Sion	2011–12	Swiss Super League	18	7	1	0	—		2	1	21	8
Sion	Total		48	17	5	3	0	0	2	1	55	21
VfL Wolfsburg	2011–12	Bundesliga	9	0	0	0	—		0	0	9	0
VfL Wolfsburg	2013–14	Bundesliga	1	0	0	0	—		0	0	1	0
VfL Wolfsburg	Total		10	0	0	0	0	0	0	0	10	0
FC Augsburg (loan)	2012–13	Bundesliga	6	0	1	0	—		0	0	7	0
Sochaux (loan)	2012–13	Ligue 1	13	4	0	0	0	0	0	0	13	4
Basel	2013–14	Swiss Super League	23	9	3	1	—		12	2	38	12
Basel	2014–15	Swiss Super League	7	1	2	1	—		1	0	10	2
Basel	Total		30	10	5	2	0	0	13	2	48	14
Bastia (loan)	2014–15	Ligue 1	13	5	0	0	2	0	0	0	15	5
Rennes	2015–16	Ligue 1	34	7	2	0	1	0	—		37	7
Rennes	2016–17	Ligue 1	34	9	1	0	0	0	—		35	9
Rennes	Total		68	16	3	0	1	0	0	0	72	16
Montpellier	2017–18	Ligue 1	33	10	2	0	2	0	—		37	10
Al-Ittihad (loan)	2018–19	UAE Pro League	21	7	4	0	—		—		25	7
Gençlerbirliği	2019–20	Süper Lig	28	10	0	0	—		—		28	10
Gençlerbirliği	2020–21	Süper Lig	3	0	0	0	—		—		3	0
Gençlerbirliği	Total		31	10	0	0	0	0	0	0	31	10
Career total			285	79	20	5	5	0	15	3	315	87

=== International goals ===
Scores and results list Ivory Coast's goal tally first.

No	Date	Venue	Opponent	Score	Result	Competition
1.	17 November 2015	Stade Félix Houphouët-Boigny, Abidjan, Ivory Coast	Liberia	1–0	3–0	2018 FIFA World Cup qualification
2.	17 November 2015	Stade Félix Houphouët-Boigny, Abidjan, Ivory Coast	Liberia	2–0	3–0	2018 FIFA World Cup qualification
3.	8 January 2017	Zayed Sports City Stadium, Abu Dhabi, United Arab Emirates	Sweden	2–1	2–1	Friendly

== Honours ==
Sion

- Swiss Cup: 2010–11
