= Robin Yalçın =

German footballer

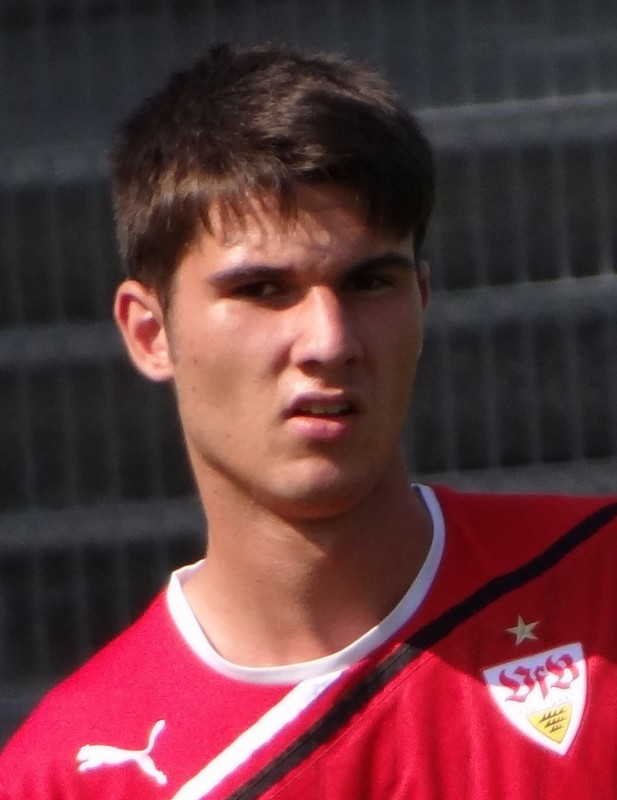
- Yalçın with VfB Stuttgart

Personal information
- Date of birth: 25 January 1994 (age 32)
- Place of birth: Deggendorf, Germany
- Height: 1.85 m (6 ft 1 in)
- Position: Defensive midfielder

Team information
- Current team: Fatih Karagümrük
- Number: 6

Youth career
- SpVgg Grün-Weiss Deggendorf
- 2009–2012: VfB Stuttgart

Senior career*
Years	Team	Apps	(Gls)
2012–2015	VfB Stuttgart II	31	(0)
2014–2015	VfB Stuttgart	3	(0)
2015–2019	Çaykur Rizespor	90	(3)
2019–2020	Yeni Malatyaspor	42	(4)
2020–2021	Sivasspor	34	(1)
2021–2022	SC Paderborn	25	(0)
2022–2023	Sivasspor	22	(1)
2023–2026	Eyüpspor	82	(2)
2026	Iğdır	14	(0)
2026–	Fatih Karagümrük	8	(0)

International career
2009	Germany U15	2	(0)
2009–2010	Germany U16	8	(0)
2010–2011	Germany U17	17	(0)
2012	Germany U18	5	(0)
2012–2013	Germany U19	13	(0)
2014	Germany U20	1	(0)
Medal record
Men's football
Representing Germany
European Under-17 Championship
Runner-up	2011
FIFA U-17 World Cup
Bronze medal – third place	2011
- * Club domestic league appearances and goals as of 19 October 2026

Robin Yalçın (born 25 January 1994) is a German professional footballer who plays as a defensive midfielder for Turkish TFF 1. Lig club Fatih Karagümrük.

== Club career ==
On 25 September 2012, Yalçın made his debut for VfB Stuttgart II in the 3. Liga against Hansa Rostock.

Yalçın made his Bundesliga debut for VfB Stuttgart on 9 February 2014 against FC Augsburg. In March 2014 Yalçın signed a professional contract until June 2016 with VfB Stuttgart.

For the 2015–16 season Yalçın moved to Çaykur Rizespor.

After terminating his contract with Çaykur Rizespor, he joined Süper Lig side Yeni Malatyaspor on 10 January 2019.

On 28 August 2020, Yalçın joined Sivasspor for free, on a one-year deal.

On 20 June 2022, Yalçın returned to Sivasspor after one year in Germany.

On February 6, 2026, he signed with Iğdır for a 1,5 years deal

== International career ==
Yalçın made his first appearance for the Germany national under-15 team on 21 May 2009 against the USA. With the Germany national under-17 team he became vice-champion of the 2011 European U-17 Championship and won the bronze medal in the 2011 FIFA U-17 World Cup.

== Personal life ==
Yalçın's father Barbaros Yalçın is the manager of SpVgg Grün-Weiss Deggendorf, and is of Turkish descent.
