= Rahmetullah Berişbek =

Turkish footballer (born 1999)

Personal information
- Date of birth: 22 March 1999 (age 27)
- Place of birth: Elmadağ, Turkey
- Height: 1.71 m (5 ft 7 in)
- Position: Midfielder

Team information
- Current team: Bursaspor
- Number: 77

Youth career
- 2012–2018: Gençlerbirliği

Senior career*
Years	Team	Apps	(Gls)
2018–2022	Gençlerbirliği	65	(2)
2022–2023	Giresunspor	18	(1)
2023–2026	Bandırmaspor	87	(4)
2026–	Bursaspor	25	(0)

International career^{‡}
2017–2018	Turkey U19	10	(1)
2019	Turkey U21	2	(0)
- * Club domestic league appearances and goals as of 19 October 2026 ‡ National team caps and goals as of 26 May 2018

Rahmetullah Berişbek (born 22 March 1999) is a Turkish professional footballer who plays as a midfielder for TFF 1. Lig club Bursaspor.

== Professional career ==
Rahmetullah joined the Gençlerbirliği youth academy in 2012. He began his senior career with Gençlerbirliği in 2018, signing a professional contract. He made his professional debut for Gençlerbirliği in a 3-2 Süper Lig loss to Kayserispor on 15 April 2018. On 31 May 2022, he transferred to Giresunspor.

== International career ==
Rahmetullah is a youth international for Turkey, having played for the Turkey U19s and U21s.
