= Erdem Özgenç =

Turkish footballer

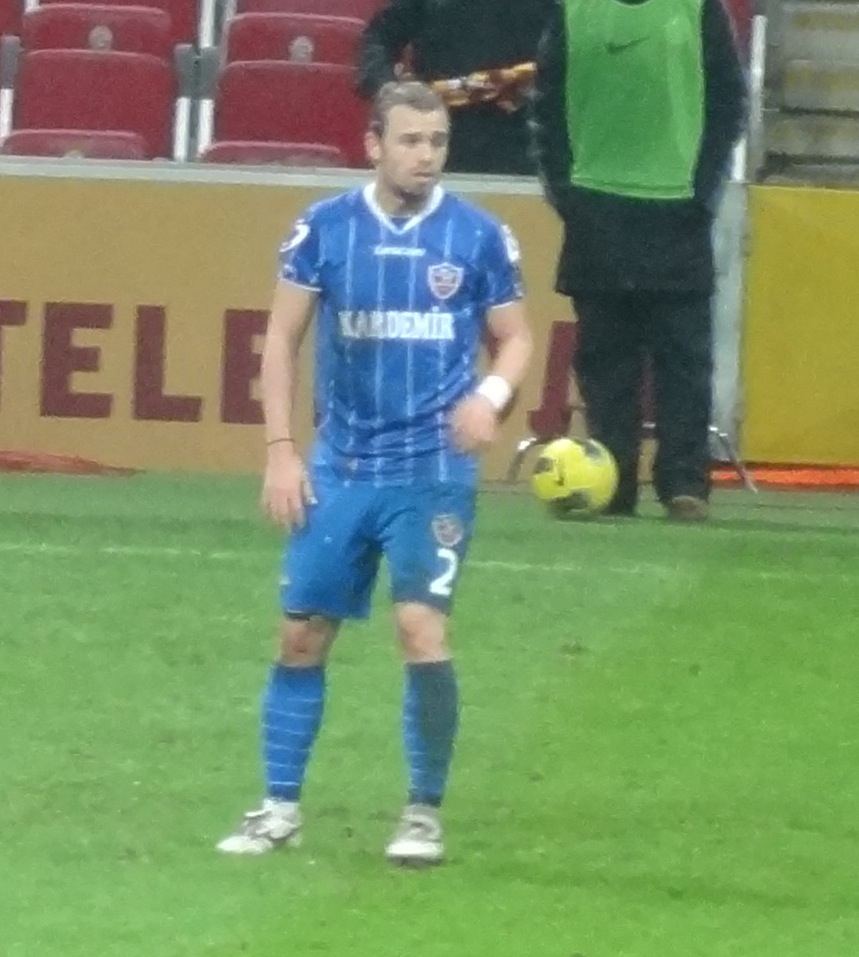

Personal information
- Date of birth: 22 August 1984 (age 42)
- Place of birth: Hendek, Turkey
- Height: 1.77 m (5 ft 10 in)
- Position: Right back

Senior career*
Years	Team	Apps	(Gls)
2004–2005	Maltepespor	26	(1)
2005–2006	Etimesgut Şekerspor	28	(0)
2007	Maltepespor	7	(0)
2007–2008	Kartalspor	24	(3)
2008–2011	Boluspor	88	(11)
2011–2015	Karabükspor	77	(2)
2015–2017	Bursaspor	29	(1)
2017–2019	Ankaragücü	47	(1)
2019	Gençlerbirliği	6	(1)
2019	Fatih Karagümrük	1	(0)
2019–2020	Gençlerbirliği	21	(0)
2020–2021	Tuzlaspor	19	(3)
2021–2022	Ankaragücü	32	(2)
2022–2024	Pendikspor	49	(3)
- * Club domestic league appearances and goals as of 24 May 2025

Erdem Özgenç (born 22 August 1984) is a Turkish football coach and former player. He played as a right back. He made his Süper Lig debut on 11 September 2011. Throughout his career, he has made 333 appearances and scored 23 goals.
