= Ahmed Ildız =

Footballer (born 1996)

Personal information
- Date of birth: 28 November 1996 (age 29)
- Place of birth: Vienna, Austria
- Height: 1.81 m (5 ft 11 in)
- Position: Midfielder

Team information
- Current team: Çorum
- Number: 30

Youth career
- 2009–2016: Rapid Wien

Senior career*
Years	Team	Apps	(Gls)
2013–2016	Rapid Wien II	43	(0)
2016–2018	Kasımpaşa	21	(1)
2018–2021	Yeni Malatyaspor	71	(2)
2021–2023	Alanyaspor	8	(0)
2022–2023	→ Eyüpspor (loan)	26	(2)
2023	→ Pendikspor (loan)	17	(3)
2023–2026	Göztepe	49	(6)
2026–	Çorum	16	(0)

International career^{‡}
2017–2018	Turkey U21	5	(0)
- * Club domestic league appearances and goals as of 5 May 2026 ‡ National team caps and goals as of 7 September 2018

Ahmed Ildız (born 28 November 1996) is a professional footballer who plays as a midfielder for Süper Lig club Çorum. Born in Austria, he is a former youth international for Turkey.

== Biography and career ==
Ildız was born in Austria and is of Turkish descent. He is a youth international for the Turkey national under-21 football team.

Ildız is a youth product of Rapid Wien, joining them since the age of 14. On 1 September 2016. he transferred to Kasımpaşa, and Ildız made his professional debut for them in a 2–1 loss to Konyaspor on 6 November 2016.

== Personal life ==
Ahmed's brother, Muhammed, is also a professional footballer currently playing for Gaziantepspor in the Süper Lig.
