= Issam Chebake =

Moroccan footballer (born 1989)

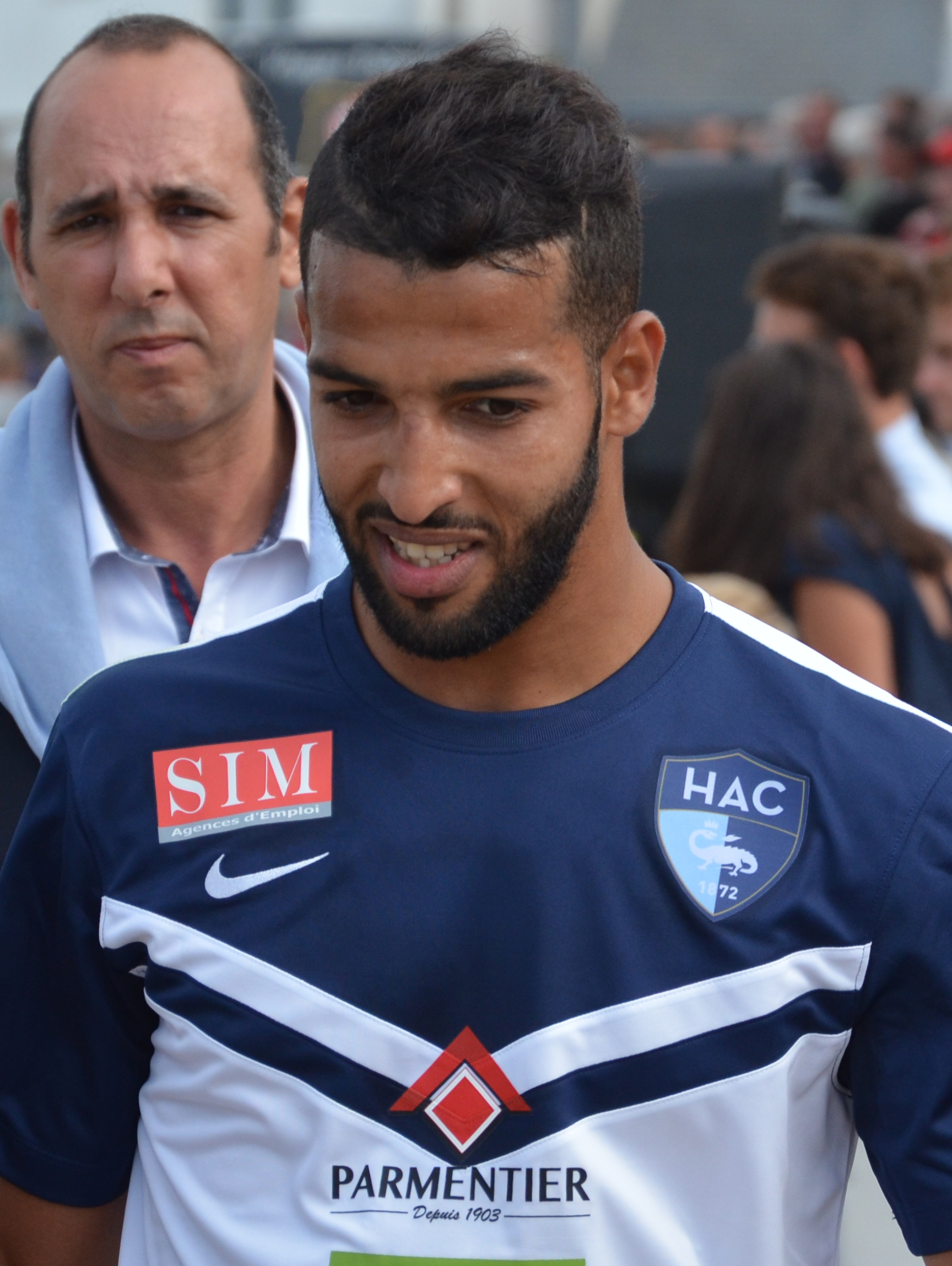
- Chebake with Le Havre in 2015

Personal information
- Date of birth: 12 October 1989 (age 37)
- Place of birth: Agadir, Morocco
- Height: 1.75 m (5 ft 9 in)
- Position: Right-back

Team information
- Current team: Krasava ENY Ypsonas FC
- Number: 29

Youth career
- 2007–2010: Marienau Forbach

Senior career*
Years	Team	Apps	(Gls)
2010–2013	Sarre-Union	76	(7)
2013–2014	Rodez	28	(2)
2014–2017	Le Havre	95	(3)
2017–2021	Yeni Malatyaspor	120	(1)
2021–2025	APOEL	90	(8)
2025–	Krasava ENY Ypsonas FC	29	(2)

International career^{‡}
2016–	Morocco	8	(0)
- * Club domestic league appearances and goals as of 14 June 2026 ‡ National team caps and goals as of 17 November 2020

Issam Chebake (Arabic: عصام شباك; born 12 October 1989) is a Moroccan professional footballer who plays as a right-back for Cypriot First Division club Krasava ENY Ypsonas and the Morocco national team.

== Club career ==
On 23 July 2021 Chebake joined Cypriot First Division club APOEL, signing a two-year contract.

On 14 May 2024 APOEL announced Chebake had signed a one-year contract extension with the club.

On 10 July 2025, Chebake joined Krasava ENY Ypsonas, signing a one-year contract.

== International career ==
Chebake was born in Morocco, and raised in France. He debuted for the Morocco national team in a 2017 Africa Cup of Nations qualification 2–0 win over Cape Verde on 3 March 2016.

== Career statistics ==
As of 30 May 2025

Appearances and goals by club, season and competition
Club	Season	League			National cup		League cup		Continental		Other		Total	
Club	Season	Division	Apps	Goals	Apps	Goals	Apps	Goals	Apps	Goals	Apps	Goals	Apps	Goals
Le Havre	2014–15	Ligue 2	31	1	1	0	1	0	—		—		33	1
Le Havre	2015–16	Ligue 2	31	1	1	0	1	0	—		—		33	1
Le Havre	2016–17	Ligue 2	33	1	2	0	2	0	—		—		37	1
Le Havre	Total		95	3	4	0	4	0	0	0	0	0	103	3
Yeni Malatyaspor	2017–18	Süper Lig	29	0	1	0	—		—		—		30	0
Yeni Malatyaspor	2018–19	Süper Lig	30	0	6	0	—		—		—		36	0
Yeni Malatyaspor	2019–20	Süper Lig	26	1	1	1	—		4	1	—		31	3
Yeni Malatyaspor	2020–21	Süper Lig	35	0	2	0	—		—		—		37	0
Yeni Malatyaspor	Total		120	1	10	1	0	0	4	0	0	0	134	3
APOEL	2021–22	Cypriot First Division	14	0	1	0	—		—		—		15	0
APOEL	2022–23	Cypriot First Division	16	0	2	0	—		6	1	—		24	1
APOEL	2023–24	Cypriot First Division	31	6	0	0	—		6	0	—		37	6
APOEL	2024–25	Cypriot First Division	29	2	2	0	—		12	1	1	0	44	3
APOEL	Total		90	8	5	0	—		24	2	1	0	120	10
Career total			305	12	19	1	4	0	28	3	1	0	357	16

== Honours ==
APOEL

- Cypriot First Division: 2023–24
