= Murat Yıldırım (footballer) =

Footballer (born 1987)

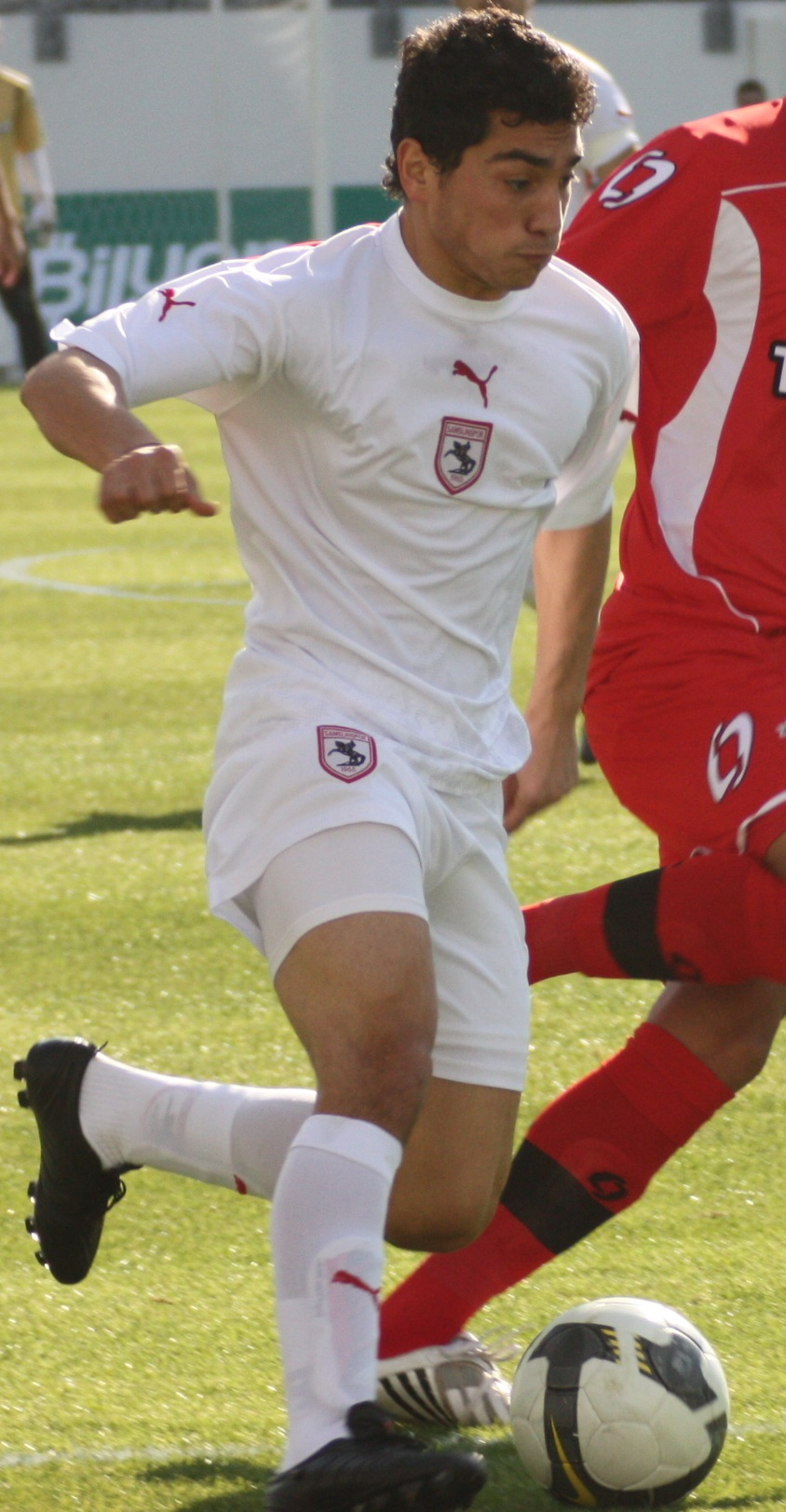
- Yıldırım in action for Samsunspor

Personal information
- Date of birth: 18 May 1987 (age 39)
- Place of birth: Çorum, Turkey
- Height: 1.71 m (5 ft 7 in)
- Position: Midfielder

Team information
- Current team: Çorum FK
- Number: 19

Youth career
- 1995–2004: Hellas Sport Zaandam
- 2004–2008: Ajax

Senior career*
Years	Team	Apps	(Gls)
2008–2012	Samsunspor	119	(12)
2012–2014	Bursaspor	41	(3)
2014–2015	Kayseri Erciyesspor	49	(2)
2015–2016	Gaziantep BB	28	(0)
2016–2017	Boluspor	14	(0)
2017–2020	Yeni Malatyaspor	95	(2)
2020–2021	Gençlerbirliği	30	(1)
2021–	Çorum	81	(6)

International career
2005	Turkey U19	2	(0)
2008	Netherlands U21	2	(0)
- * Club domestic league appearances and goals as of 18:33, 21 December 2023 (UTC)

Murat Yıldırım (born 18 May 1987) is a professional footballer who plays as a midfielder for TFF First League club Çorum. Notably, he is also the owner of the club.

== International career ==
Yıldırım picked up caps as a youth international, having been capped twice by the Turkey national under-19 team, and most recently by the Netherlands U21.

== Honours ==
Individual

- AFC Ajax Talent of the Future: 2004
