= 2023–24 İstanbul Başakşehir F.K. season =

Başakşehir
2023–24 season
- President: Göksel Gümüşdağ
- Head coach: Emre Belözoğlu (until 3 September); Çağdaş Atan (from 11 September)
- Stadium: Başakşehir Fatih Terim Stadium
- Süper Lig: 4th
- Turkish Cup: Quarter-finals
- Top goalscorer: League: Krzysztof Piątek (17); All: Krzysztof Piątek (17)
Home colours	Away colours

The 2023–24 season was Başakşehir's 34th season in existence and 10th consecutive in the Süper Lig. They also competed in the Turkish Cup.

== Players ==
=== First-team squad ===
As of 18 February 2024

Note: Flags indicate national team as defined under FIFA eligibility rules; some limited exceptions apply. Players may hold more than one non-FIFA nationality.

No.	Pos.	Nation	Player
1	GK	TUR	Volkan Babacan
3	DF	GHA	Jerome Opoku (on loan from Arouca)
4	MF	TUR	Onur Ergün
5	DF	BRA	Léo Duarte
6	DF	BRA	Lucas Lima
7	FW	TUR	Serdar Gürler
8	MF	SRB	Danijel Aleksić
9	FW	POL	Krzysztof Piątek
10	MF	TUR	Berkay Özcan
11	FW	BRA	Davidson
14	MF	GRE	Dimitrios Pelkas
15	DF	FRA	Léo Dubois (on loan from Galatasaray)
16	GK	TUR	Muhammed Şengezer
17	FW	SEN	Philippe Kény
19	MF	ALG	Mehdi Abeid

No.	Pos.	Nation	Player
20	MF	CMR	Olivier Kemen
21	MF	TUR	Mahmut Tekdemir (captain)
23	MF	TUR	Deniz Türüç
24	DF	TUR	Eren Karaağaç
25	FW	BRA	João Figueiredo
26	MF	TUR	Emirhan İlkhan (on loan from Torino)
27	DF	SEN	Ousseynou Ba (on loan from Olympiacos)
34	DF	TUR	Yağız Dilek
42	MF	TUR	Ömer Ali Şahiner
70	DF	TUR	Burak Sefa Kavraz
80	MF	TUR	Berkay Aydoğmuş
85	MF	CIV	Mohamed Hassan Fofana
89	MF	BRA	Josef de Souza
91	FW	TUR	Batuhan Çelik
98	GK	TUR	Deniz Dilmen

=== Other players under contract ===
Note: Flags indicate national team as defined under FIFA eligibility rules; some limited exceptions apply. Players may hold more than one non-FIFA nationality.

No. / Pos. / Nation / Player; — / DF / TUR / Efe Arda Koyuncu	No. / Pos. / Nation / Player; — / FW / POL / Patryk Szysz

=== Out on loan ===
Note: Flags indicate national team as defined under FIFA eligibility rules; some limited exceptions apply. Players may hold more than one non-FIFA nationality.

No.	Pos.	Nation	Player
—	DF	TUR	Muhammet Arslantaş (at Kastamonuspor 1966 until 30 June 2024)
—	DF	AZE	Mert Çelik (at Bandırmaspor until 30 June 2024)
—	DF	AZE	Emre Kaplan (at Bandırmaspor until 30 June 2024)
—	DF	TUR	Ayberk Kaygısız (at Isparta 32 Spor until 30 June 2024)
—	DF	CGO	Francis Nzaba (at Gençlerbirliği until 30 June 2024)
—	DF	TUR	Bedirhan Özyurt (at Kırklarelispor until 30 June 2024)
—	DF	TUR	Muhammed Emin Sarıkaya (at GMG Kastamonuspor until 30 June 2024)
—	DF	TUR	Cemali Sertel (at Hatayspor until 30 June 2024)
—	DF	TUR	Ravil Tagir (at Westerlo until 30 June 2024)
—	DF	ALG	Ahmed Touba (at Lecce until 30 June 2024)

No.	Pos.	Nation	Player
—	DF	TUR	Doğukan Tuzcu (at Kırıkkalegücü until 30 June 2024)
—	DF	CHN	Wu Shaocong (at Gençlerbirliği until 30 June 2024)
—	MF	GUI	Sékou Tidiany Bangoura (at Tuzlaspor until 30 June 2024)
—	MF	TUR	Metin Emre Karaal (at Anadolu Üniversitesi SK until 30 June 2024)
—	MF	ISR	Eden Kartsev (at Maccabi Tel Aviv until 30 June 2024)
—	MF	TUR	Alican Özfesli (at Erzurumspor until 30 June 2024)
—	FW	TUR	Enes Karakuş (at 1461 Trabzon until 30 June 2024)
—	FW	TUR	Eray Sürül (at Karaman FK until 30 June 2024)
—	FW	TUR	Efecan Barlık (at Kırklarelispor until 30 June 2024)

== Transfers ==
=== In ===
Pos.	Player	Transferred from	Fee	Date	Source
MF	(Algeria) Mehdi Abeid	(United Arab Emirates) Khor Fakkan	Free	10 July 2023	
FW	(Poland) Krzysztof Piątek	(Germany) Hertha Berlin	Free	18 July 2023	
FW	(Greece) Dimitrios Pelkas	(Turkey) Fenerbahçe	Free	21 July 2023	
DF	(Senegal) Ousseynou Ba	(Greece) Olympiacos	Loan	29 August 2023	
MF	(Turkey) Emirhan İlkhan	(Italy) Torino	Loan	30 August 2023	
DF	(England) Jerome Opoku	(Portugal) Arouca	Loan	14 September 2023	
DF	(France) Léo Dubois	(Turkey) Galatasaray	Loan	15 September 2023	

=== Out ===
Pos.	Player	Transferred to	Fee	Date	Source
MF	(Belgium) Nacer Chadli	(Belgium) Westerlo	Free	1 July 2023	
DF	(Turkey) Caner Erkin	(Turkey) Eyüpspor	Free	1 July 2023	
MF	(Argentina) Lucas Biglia	Released		1 July 2023	
DF	(Turkey) Muhammed Emin Sarıkaya	(Turkey) Ümraniyespor	Loan	4 July 2023	
FW	(Turkey) Ahmed Kutucu	(Turkey) Eyüpspor	Undisclosed	12 July 2023	
DF	(China) Wu Shaocong	(Turkey) Gençlerbirliği	Loan	18 July 2023	
MF	(France) Mounir Chouiar	Released	Free	11 August 2023	
FW	(Italy) Stefano Okaka	Released	Free	18 August 2023	
DF	(Algeria) Ahmed Touba	(Italy) Lecce	Loan	27 August 2023	

=== New contracts ===
Position	Player	Until	Ref.
DF	(Turkey) Şener Özbayraklı	June 2024	

== Pre-season and friendlies ==
Win Draw Loss Fixtures

14 July 2023 Friendly	Antalyaspor (Turkey)	2–1	(Turkey) İstanbul Başakşehir	Burdur, Turkey
17:00 UTC+3				Stadium: Makü İstiklal Stadı

23 July 2023 Friendly	İstanbul Başakşehir (Turkey)	3–1	(Qatar) Al-Markhiya	Burdur, Turkey
18:00 UTC+3				Stadium: Makü İstiklal Stadı

== Competitions ==
=== Overall record ===
Competition	First match	Last match	Starting round	Final position	Record							
Competition	First match	Last match	Starting round	Final position	Pld	W	D	L	GF	GA	GD	Win %
Süper Lig	14 August 2023	26 May 2024	Matchday 1		36	17	7	12	51	40	+11	47.22
Turkish Cup	7 December 2023	28 February 2024	Fourth round	Quarter-finals	4	2	1	1	4	2	+2	50.00
Total					40	19	8	13	55	42	+13	47.50

Last updated: 12 May 2024
Source: Soccerway

=== Süper Lig ===
==== League table ====
Pos	Team	Pld	W	D	L	GF	GA	GD	Pts	Qualification or relegation
2	Fenerbahçe	38	31	6	1	99	31	+68	99	Qualification for the Champions League second qualifying round
3	Trabzonspor	38	21	4	13	69	50	+19	67	Qualification for the Europa League second qualifying round
4	Başakşehir	38	18	7	13	57	43	+14	61	Qualification for the Conference League second qualifying round
5	Kasımpaşa	38	16	8	14	62	65	−3	56 (Note: Kasımpaşa are ahead of Beşiktaş on head-to-head points: Kasımpaşa 2–1 Beşiktaş, Beşiktaş 1–3 Kasımpaşa.)	
6	Beşiktaş	38	16	8	14	52	47	+5	56	Qualification for the Europa League play-off round (Note: The 2023–24 Turkish Cup winners (Beşiktaş) qualify for the Europa League play-off round.)

Source: Süper Lig
Rules for classification: 1) Points; 2) Head-to-head points; 3) Head-to-head goal difference; 4) Head-to-head goals scored; 5) Goal difference; 6) Goals scored; 7) Play-off.

==== Results summary ====
Overall								Home						Away					
Pld	W	D	L	GF	GA	GD	Pts	W	D	L	GF	GA	GD	W	D	L	GF	GA	GD
36	17	7	12	51	40	+11	58	10	3	5	30	18	+12	7	4	7	21	22	−1

Last updated: 12 May 2024.
Source: Trendyol Süper Lig

==== Results by round ====
Round	1	2	3	4	5	6	7	8	9	10	11	12	13	14	15	16	17	18	19	20	21	22	23	24	25	26	27	28	29	30	31	32	33	34	35	36	37	38
Ground	A	H	A	H	A	H	A	H	A	A	H	A	H	A	H	A	H	A	H	H	A	H	A	H	A	H	A	H	H	A	H	A	H	A	H	A	H	A
Result	L	L	L	L	W	L	D	W	D	L	D	L	W	L	W	W	W	D	D	W	D	L	W	W	L	L	W	W	W	L	D	W	W	W	W	W	L	
Position	19	20	20	20	18	19	19	15	17	17	18	18	17	17	14	14	10	10	11	8	9	10	9	8	8	9	7	6	6	6	7	6	5	4	4	4	4	

Source: Trendyol Süper Lig
A = Away; H = Home; W = Win; D = Draw; L = Loss

==== Matches ====
The league fixtures were unveiled on 18 July 2023.

14 August 2023 1	Alanyaspor	2–0	İstanbul Başakşehir	Alanya
21:00 UTC+3	Aliti (yellow card) 8'; Richard (yellow card) 15'; Karaca (yellow card) 35'; Bayır (yellow card) 35'; Novais 45+4'; Özdemir (yellow card) 56'; Carlos Eduardo 90+6'	Report	Pelkas (yellow card) 5'; Figueiredo (yellow card) 45+6' (yellow-red card) 77'; Aleksić (yellow card) 90+2'	Stadium: Kırbıyık Holding Stadium; Attendance: 3,030; Referee: Tugay Kaan Numanoğlu

20 August 2023 2	İstanbul Başakşehir	0–2	Fatih Karagümrük	Istanbul
19:15 UTC+3	Kartsev (yellow card) 28'; Gürler (yellow card) 32'; Pelkas (yellow card) 85'	Report	Mendes 6', (yellow card) 38'; Şengezer 30' (o.g.); Rohdén (yellow card) 61'; Shukurov (yellow card) 90'; Dursun (yellow card) 90+4'	Stadium: Başakşehir Fatih Terim Stadium; Referee: Burak Şeker

28 September 2023 3	Fenerbahçe	4–0	İstanbul Başakşehir	Istanbul
20:00 UTC+3		Report		Stadium: Şükrü Saracoğlu Stadium
Note: The match scheduled for 27 August 2023 was postponed due to the UEFA Conference League play-offs.

2 September 2023 4	İstanbul Başakşehir	0–1	Konyaspor	Istanbul
19:15 UTC+3		Report	Cikalleshi 53'	Stadium: Başakşehir Fatih Terim Stadium; Referee: Atilla Karaoğlan

17 September 2023 5	İstanbulspor	0–2	İstanbul Başakşehir	Istanbul
17:00 UTC+3		Report		Stadium: Esenyurt Necmi Kadıoğlu Stadium

23 September 2023 6	İstanbul Başakşehir	1–2	Galatasaray	Istanbul
20:00 UTC+3		Report		Stadium: Başakşehir Fatih Terim Stadium

2 October 2023 7	Kayserispor	0–0	İstanbul Başakşehir	Kayseri
20:00 UTC+3		Report		Stadium: Kadir Has Stadium

7 October 2023 8	İstanbul Başakşehir	2–0	Gaziantep F.K.	Istanbul
19:00 UTC+3		Report		Stadium: Başakşehir Fatih Terim Stadium

22 October 2023 9	Samsunspor	0–0	İstanbul Başakşehir	Samsun
19:00 UTC+3		Report		Stadium: Samsun 19 Mayıs Stadium

29 October 2023 10	Antalyaspor	1–0	İstanbul Başakşehir	Antalya
19:00 UTC+3		Report		Stadium: Antalya Stadium

5 November 2023 11	İstanbul Başakşehir	3–3	Ankaragücü	Istanbul
16:00 UTC+3		Report		Stadium: Başakşehir Fatih Terim Stadium

12 November 2023 12	Beşiktaş	1–0	İstanbul Başakşehir	Istanbul
16:00 UTC+3		Report		Stadium: Beşiktaş Stadium

27 November 2023 13	İstanbul Başakşehir	4–1	Pendikspor	Istanbul
20:00				Stadium: Başakşehir Fatih Terim Stadium

2 December 2023 14	Çaykur Rizespor	3–2	İstanbul Başakşehir	Rize
16:00				Stadium: Rize City Stadium

10 December 2023 15	İstanbul Başakşehir	1–0	Hatayspor	Istanbul
16:00				Stadium: Başakşehir Fatih Terim Stadium

19 December 2023 17	İstanbul Başakşehir	3–1	Sivasspor	Istanbul
17:00				Stadium: Başakşehir Fatih Terim Stadium; Referee: Mete Kalkavan

23 December 2023 18	Trabzonspor	1–1	İstanbul Başakşehir	Trabzon
19:00				Stadium: Papara Park

6 January 2024 19	İstanbul Başakşehir	0–0	Adana Demirspor	Istanbul
16:00				Stadium: Başakşehir Fatih Terim Stadium; Referee: Turgut Doman

9 January 2024 16	Kasımpaşa	0–3	İstanbul Başakşehir	Istanbul
20:00				Stadium: Recep Tayyip Erdoğan Stadium

13 January 2024 20	İstanbul Başakşehir	3–2	Alanyaspor	Istanbul
				Stadium: Başakşehir Fatih Terim Stadium

20 January 2024 21	Fatih Karagümrük	1–1	İstanbul Başakşehir	Istanbul
16:00				Stadium: Esenyurt Necmi Kadıoğlu Stadium; Referee: Ümit Öztürk

24 January 2024 22	İstanbul Başakşehir	0–1	Fenerbahçe	Istanbul
				Stadium: Başakşehir Fatih Terim Stadium

28 January 2024 23	Konyaspor	2–3	İstanbul Başakşehir	Konya
13:30				Stadium: Konya Metropolitan Municipality Stadium

3 February 2024 24	İstanbul Başakşehir	2–0	İstanbulspor	Istanbul
16:00 TRT (UTC+3)	Piątek 36', 71'; Ba (yellow card) 90+1'		Rroca (yellow card) 41'	Stadium: Başakşehir Fatih Terim Stadium; Referee: Emre Kargın

10 February 2024 25	Galatasaray	2–0	İstanbul Başakşehir	Istanbul
19:00 TRT (UTC+3)	Yılmaz 25'; Mertens 31'			Stadium: Rams Park; Referee: Cihan Aydın

19 February 2024 26	İstanbul Başakşehir	2–3	Kayserispor	Istanbul
20:00 TRT (UTC+3)	Türüç 58'; Kemen (yellow card) 79'; Güreler 89'; Piątek (yellow card) 65', (penalty missed) 90+12'		Nazon 9'; Karimi 15'; Boa Morte 84'; Kaldırım (yellow card) 90+4'; Sazdağı (yellow card) 90+11'	Stadium: Başakşehir Fatih Terim Stadium; Referee: Oğuzhan Çakır

24 February 2024 27	Gaziantep	0–2	İstanbul Başakşehir	Gaziantep
16:00 TRT (UTC+3)	Monteiro (yellow card) 45'		Figueiredo (yellow card) 40'; Piątek 60'; Abeid (yellow card) 57', (goal) 90+8'; Türüç (yellow card) 84'	Stadium: Gaziantep Stadium; Referee: Ali Şansalan

3 March 2024 28	İstanbul Başakşehir	1–0	Samsunspor	Istanbul
13:30				Stadium: Başakşehir Fatih Terim Stadium

9 March 2024 29	İstanbul Başakşehir	1–0	Antalyaspor	Istanbul
19:00				Stadium: Başakşehir Fatih Terim Stadium

16 March 2024 30	Ankaragücü	2–1	İstanbul Başakşehir	Ankara
				Stadium: Eryaman Stadium

4 April 2024 31	İstanbul Başakşehir	1–1	Beşiktaş	Istanbul
20:30				Stadium: Başakşehir Fatih Terim Stadium

14 April 2024 32	Pendikspor	2–3	İstanbul Başakşehir	Istanbul
				Stadium: Pendik Stadium

21 April 2024 33	İstanbul Başakşehir	2–0	Çaykur Rizespor	Istanbul
13:30				Stadium: Başakşehir Fatih Terim Stadium

27 April 2024 34	Hatayspor	1–2	İstanbul Başakşehir	Mersin

5 May 2024 35	İstanbul Başakşehir	4–1	Kasımpaşa	Istanbul
16:00				Stadium: Başakşehir Fatih Terim Stadium

12 May 2024 36	Sivasspor	0–1	İstanbul Başakşehir	Sivas

18 May 2024 37	İstanbul Başakşehir	0–1	Trabzonspor	Istanbul
19:00				Stadium: Başakşehir Fatih Terim Stadium

26 May 2024 38	Adana Demirspor	v	İstanbul Başakşehir	Adana
19:00				Stadium: New Adana Stadium

=== Turkish Cup ===
7 December 2023 Fourth round	İstanbul Başakşehir	2–0	Şanlıurfaspor	Istanbul
21:00	Pelkas 63'; İlkhan 72'			Stadium: İstanbul Başakşehir Fatih Terim; Referee: Yasin Kol

17 January 2024 Fifth round	İstanbul Başakşehir	1–0	Boluspor	Istanbul
13:00	Kény 19'			Stadium: İstanbul Başakşehir Fatih Terim; Referee: Burak Olcar

7 February 2024 Round of 16	İstanbul Başakşehir	1–1 (a.e.t.) (3–2 p)	Hatayspor	Istanbul
17:30	Kény 23'		Massanga 58'	Stadium: İstanbul Başakşehir Fatih Terim; Referee: Bahattin Şimşek
	Penalties
	Szysz (penalty missed); Ba (penalty scored); Türüç (penalty missed); Özcan (penalty scored); Opoku (penalty scored)		(penalty missed) Rivas; (penalty missed) Sağlam; (penalty scored) Massanga; (penalty scored) Sinik; (penalty missed) Strandberg

28 February 2024 Quarter-finals	Trabzonspor	1–0	İstanbul Başakşehir	Trabzon
17:30	Višća 57'	Report		Stadium: Papara Park; Referee: Kadir Sağlam
