= 2022–23 İstanbul Başakşehir F.K. season =

Başakşehir
2022–23 season
- President: Göksel Gümüşdağ
- Head coach: Emre Belözoğlu
- Stadium: Başakşehir Fatih Terim Stadium
- Süper Lig: 5th
- Turkish Cup: Runners-up
- UEFA Europa Conference League: Round of 16
- Top goalscorer: League: Danijel Aleksić (8); All: Danijel Aleksić (14)
Home colours	Away colours	Third colours

The 2022–23 season was the 33rd in the history of İstanbul Başakşehir F.K. and their ninth consecutive season in the top flight. The club participated in the Süper Lig, Turkish Cup, and UEFA Europa Conference League.

== Players ==
=== First-team squad ===
As of 22 March 2023

Note: Flags indicate national team as defined under FIFA eligibility rules; some limited exceptions apply. Players may hold more than one non-FIFA nationality.

No.	Pos.	Nation	Player
1	GK	TUR	Volkan Babacan
2	MF	TUR	Şener Özbayraklı
4	DF	CHN	Wu Shaocong
5	DF	BRA	Léo Duarte
7	FW	TUR	Serdar Gürler
8	MF	SRB	Danijel Aleksić
11	MF	BEL	Adnan Januzaj (on loan from Sevilla)
15	FW	TUR	Batuhan Çelik
16	GK	TUR	Muhammed Şengezer
17	FW	SEN	Philippe Kény
18	FW	POL	Patryk Szysz
19	MF	TUR	Berkay Özcan
20	MF	ARG	Lucas Biglia
21	MF	TUR	Mahmut Tekdemir (captain)

No.	Pos.	Nation	Player
23	MF	TUR	Deniz Türüç
25	FW	BRA	João Figueiredo
34	FW	TUR	Muhammet Arslantaş
41	DF	TUR	Efe Arda Koyuncu
42	MF	TUR	Ömer Ali Şahiner
51	DF	GBS	Edgar Ié
59	DF	ALG	Ahmed Touba
60	DF	BRA	Lucas Lima
72	MF	ISR	Eden Kartsev
77	FW	ITA	Stefano Okaka
78	GK	TUR	Yağız Efe Erataman
88	DF	TUR	Caner Erkin
98	GK	TUR	Deniz Dilmen
—	DF	TUR	Ayberk Kaygısız

=== Out on loan ===
Note: Flags indicate national team as defined under FIFA eligibility rules; some limited exceptions apply. Players may hold more than one non-FIFA nationality.

No.	Pos.	Nation	Player
—	DF	AZE	Emre Kaplan (at Adanaspor until 30 June 2023)
—	DF	CGO	Francis Nzaba (at Dinamo Tbilisi until 30 June 2023)
—	DF	TUR	Muharrem Öner (at Esenler Erokspor until 30 June 2023)
—	DF	TUR	Bedirhan Özyurt (at Pazarspor until 30 June 2023)
—	DF	TUR	Muhammed Emin Sarıkaya (at Ankara Keçiörengücü until 30 June 2023)
—	DF	TUR	Cemali Sertel (at Antalyaspor until 30 June 2023)
—	DF	TUR	Ravil Tagir (at Westerlo until 30 June 2024)
—	DF	TUR	Can Yazıcı (at Serik Belediyespor until 30 June 2023)
—	DF	TUR	Barkın Yiğit (at Uşakspor until 30 June 2023)
—	MF	GUI	Sekoua Tidiany Bangoura (at Gençlerbirliği until 30 June 2023)

No.	Pos.	Nation	Player
—	MF	BEL	Nacer Chadli (at Westerlo until 30 June 2023)
—	MF	TUR	Metin Emre Karaal (at Büyükçekmece Tepecikspor until 30 June 2023)
—	MF	TUR	Alper Karaman (at Esenler Erokspor until 30 June 2023)
—	MF	TUR	Alican Özfesli (at Erzurumspor until 30 June 2023)
—	MF	GUI	Alya Toure (at Sumgayit until 30 June 2023)
—	FW	TUR	Efecan Barlık (at Ergene Velimeşe until 30 June 2023)
—	FW	FRA	Mounir Chouiar (at Kasımpaşa until 30 June 2023)
—	FW	TUR	Atabey Çiçek (at Bandırmaspor until 30 June 2023)
—	FW	TUR	Enes Karakuş (at 1461 Trabzon until 30 June 2023)
—	FW	TUR	Ahmed Kutucu (at SV Sandhausen until 30 June 2023)

== Transfers ==
=== In ===
Date	No.	Pos.	Player	From	Fee	Source
30 June 2022	—	FW	(France) Enzo Crivelli	(France) Saint-Étienne	End of loan	
30 June 2022	—	MF	(Austria) Peter Žulj	(Hungary) Fehérvár	End of loan	
30 June 2022	—	MF	(Nigeria) Azubuike Okechukwu	(Turkey) Yeni Malatyaspor	End of loan	
30 June 2022	—	DF	(Turkey) Cemali Sertel	(Turkey) Çaykur Rizespor	End of loan	
30 June 2022	—	DF	(Cape Verde) Carlos Ponck	(Turkey) Çaykur Rizespor	End of loan	
30 June 2022	—	DF	(Turkey) Mert Çelik	(Azerbaijan) Neftçi PFK	End of loan	
30 June 2022	—	DF	(Turkey) Emre Kaplan	(Turkey) Hatayspor	End of loan	
30 June 2022	—	MF	(Turkey) Mete Kaan Demir	(Turkey) Eyüpspor	End of loan	
30 June 2022	—	DF	(Turkey) Muhammed Sarıkaya	(Turkey) Yeni Malatyaspor	End of loan	
30 June 2022	—	MF	(Turkey) Emir Şenocak	(Turkey) Menemen	End of loan	
30 June 2022	—	FW	(Turkey) Muhammet Arslantaş	(Turkey) Belediye Kütahyaspor	End of loan	
30 June 2022	—	MF	(Turkey) Salim Farsak	(Turkey) Alanya Kestelspor	End of loan	
30 June 2022	—	FW	(Turkey) Muzaffer Kahrıman	(Turkey) 52 Orduspor	End of loan	
30 June 2022	—	DF	(Turkey) Mustafa Kutay Pekşen	(Turkey) Bayrampaşa	End of loan	
9 May 2022	32	DF	(Republic of the Congo) Francis Nzaba	(Republic of the Congo) Diables Noirs	Free	
6 June 2022	—	MF	(Turkey) Alper Karaman	(Turkey) Esenler Erokspor	Free	
10 June 2022	20	MF	(Argentina) Lucas Biglia	(Turkey) Fatih Karagümrük	Free	
30 June 2022	59	DF	(Algeria) Ahmed Touba	(Netherlands) RKC Waalwijk	€2,000,000	
8 July 2022	5	DF	(Brazil) Léo Duarte	(Italy) AC Milan	€2,000,000	
8 July 2022	11	FW	(France) Mounir Chouiar	(France) Dijon	€1,500,000	
14 July 2022	10	MF	(Germany) Mesut Özil	(Turkey) Fenerbahçe	Free	
22 August 2022	9	FW	(Burkina Faso) Bertrand Traoré	(England) Aston Villa	Loan	
29 August 2022	17	FW	(Senegal) Philippe Kény	(Turkey) Bandırmaspor	€1,200,000	
10 January 2023	4	DF	(China) Wu Shaocong	(China) Guangzhou	Free	
23 January 2023	51	DF	(Portugal) Edgar Ié	Free agent		
28 January 2023	88	DF	(Turkey) Caner Erkin	(Turkey) Fatih Karagümrük	Free	
31 January 2023	72	MF	(Israel) Eden Kartsev	(Israel) Maccabi Netanya	€2,300,000	
3 February 2023	11	MF	(Belgium) Adnan Januzaj	(Spain) Sevilla	Loan	
17 February 2023	25	FW	(Brazil) João Figueiredo	(Turkey) Gaziantep	€650,000	
18 February 2023	22	DF	(Turkey) Ayberk Kaygısız	(Turkey) Balıkesirspor	Undisclosed	
2 March 2023	80	MF	(Turkey) Berkay Aydoğmuş	(Turkey) Nazilli Belediyespor	Undisclosed	

=== Out ===
Date	No.	Pos.	Player	To	Fee	Source
30 June 2022	27	FW	(Egypt) Trézéguet	(England) Aston Villa	End of loan	
30 June 2022	20	MF	(Portugal) Pizzi	(Portugal) Benfica	End of loan	
30 June 2022	48	MF	(Turkey) Salih Uçan	(Turkey) Beşiktaş	End of loan	
30 June 2022	5	DF	(Brazil) Léo Duarte	(Italy) AC Milan	End of loan	
1 July 2022	—	MF	(Turkey) Soner Aydoğdu	(Turkey) Antalyaspor	Free	
1 July 2022	4	DF	(Turkey) Ravil Tagir	(Belgium) Westerlo	Loan	
5 July 2022	—	DF	(Turkey) Emre Kaplan	(Turkey) Adanaspor	Loan	
16 July 2022	—	MF	(Turkey) Emir Şenocak	(Turkey) Bandırmaspor	Free	
20 July 2022	—	FW	(Turkey) Abdulkadir Çelik	(Turkey) Kırşehir Futbol SK	Free	
27 July 2022	—	DF	(Turkey) Cemali Sertel	(Turkey) Antalyaspor	Loan	
28 July 2022	—	FW	(Turkey) Atabey Çiçek	(Turkey) Bandırmaspor	Loan	
1 August 2022	52	MF	(Turkey) Emre Çolak	(Turkey) Göztepe	Free	
6 August 2022	—	MF	(Turkey) Salim Farsak	(Turkey) 1461 Trabzon	Free	
7 August 2022	—	MF	(Turkey) Alper Karaman	(Turkey) Esenler Erokspor	Loan	
11 August 2022	—	FW	(Turkey) Muzaffer Kahrıman	(Turkey) Uşakspor	Free	
30 August 2022	27	FW	(France) Enzo Crivelli	(Switzerland) Servette	Free	
31 August 2022	32	MF	(Austria) Peter Žulj	(China) Changchun Yatai	Free	
31 August 2022	28	MF	(Turkey) Tolga Ciğerci	(Turkey) MKE Ankaragücü	Free	
1 September 2022	—	DF	(Cape Verde) Carlos Ponck	(Portugal) Chaves	Free	
6 September 2022	22	FW	(Belgium) Nacer Chadli	(Belgium) Westerlo	Loan	
8 September 2022	22	FW	(Norway) Fredrik Gulbrandsen	(Turkey) Adana Demirspor	Free	
8 September 2022	—	MF	(Turkey) Mete Demir	(Turkey) Eyüpspor	Free	
8 September 2022	—	DF	(Turkey) Mustafa Kutay Pekşen	(Turkey) Bayrampaşa	Free	
8 September 2022	—	DF	(Turkey) Muhammed Sarıkaya	(Turkey) Ankara Keçiörengücü	Loan	
6 January 2023	14	MF	(Nigeria) Azubuike Okechukwu	(Turkey) Çaykur Rizespor	Free	
16 January 2023	2	DF	(Turkey) Hasan Ali Kaldırım	(Turkey) MKE Ankaragücü	Free	
19 January 2023	6	DF	(Moldova) Alexandru Epureanu	(Turkey) Ümraniyespor	Free	
24 January 2023	32	DF	(Republic of the Congo) Francis Nzaba	(Georgia (country)) Dinamo Tbilisi	Loan	
25 January 2023	55	DF	(Burundi) Youssouf Ndayishimiye	(France) Nice	€11,500,000	
28 January 2023	11	FW	(France) Mounir Chouiar	(Turkey) Kasımpaşa	Loan	
31 January 2023	9	FW	(Burkina Faso) Bertrand Traoré	(England) Aston Villa	End of loan	
16 February 2023	—	DF	(Turkey) Emre Kaplan	(Turkey) Bandırmaspor	Loan	
17 February 2023	99	FW	(Turkey) Atabey Çiçek	(Turkey) Bandırmaspor	Loan	
6 March 2023	80	DF	(Brazil) Júnior Caiçara		Contract termination	
22 March 2023	10	MF	(Germany) Mesut Özil	Retired		

== Pre-season and friendlies ==
Win Draw Loss Fixtures

1 July 2022 Friendly	İstanbul Başakşehir (Turkey)	3–0	(Ukraine) Metalist Kharkiv	Burdur
17:30 TRT (UTC+3)	Çolak 6'; Chadli 59', 72'			Stadium: Makü İstiklal Stadı

8 July 2022 Friendly	İstanbul Başakşehir (Turkey)	4–0	(Turkey) Altay	Burdur
18:00 TRT (UTC+3)	Bangoura 15'; Gürler 32'; Chadli 40'; Çiçek 60'			Stadium: Makü İstiklal Stadı

10 July 2022 Friendly	İstanbul Başakşehir (Turkey)	0–0	(Turkey) Antalyaspor	Burdur
18:00 TRT (UTC+3)				Stadium: Makü İstiklal Stadı

15 July 2022 Friendly	İstanbul Başakşehir (Turkey)	1–0	(Turkey) Konyaspor	Istanbul
18:00 TRT (UTC+3)	Crivelli 62'			Stadium: Fatih Terim Stadium

25 September 2022 Friendly	İstanbul Başakşehir (Turkey)	5–2	(Turkey) Eyüpspor	Istanbul
17:00 TRT (UTC+3)	Arslantaş 35'; Okaka 55'; Kény 60'; Aleksić 75'; Chouiar 80'		Yumurtacı 82'; Babel 87'	Stadium: Başakşehir 3 Nolu Saha

30 November 2022 Friendly	İstanbul Başakşehir (Turkey)	1–1	(England) Hull City	Belek
15:30 TRT (UTC+3)	Aleksić 13' (pen.)		Smith 74'	Stadium: Regnum Carya Golf & Spa Resort - Field 1

10 December 2022 Friendly	İstanbul Başakşehir (Turkey)	2–1	(Belgium) Westerlo	Antalya
15:00 TRT (UTC+3)	Özcan 38'; Chouiar 40'		Nene 9'	Stadium: Mardan 2. Stadı

13 December 2022 Friendly	İstanbul Başakşehir (Turkey)	2–2	(France) Toulouse	Antalya
16:00 TRT (UTC+3)	Kény 28'; Türüç 78' (pen.)	Report	Chaïbi 30' (pen.); Dallinga 38'

25 February 2023 Friendly	Göztepe (Turkey)	0–0	(Turkey) İstanbul Başakşehir	İzmir
16:00 TRT (UTC+3)		Report		Stadium: Gürsel Aksel Stadium

== Competitions ==
=== Overall record ===
Competition	First match	Last match	Starting round	Final position	Record							
Competition	First match	Last match	Starting round	Final position	Pld	W	D	L	GF	GA	GD	Win %
Süper Lig	8 August 2022	6 June 2023	Matchday 1	5th	36	18	8	10	54	37	+17	50.00
Turkish Cup	21 December 2022	11 June 2023	Fifth round	Runners-up	6	3	2	1	11	9	+2	50.00
UEFA Europa Conference League	21 July 2022	15 March 2023	Second qualifying round	Round of 16	14	8	4	2	27	12	+15	57.14
Total					56	29	14	13	92	58	+34	51.79

Source: Soccerway

=== Süper Lig ===
==== League table ====
Pos	Team	Pld	W	D	L	GF	GA	GD	Pts	Qualification or relegation
3	Beşiktaş	36	23	9	4	78	36	+42	78	Qualification for the Europa Conference League second qualifying round
4	Adana Demirspor	36	20	9	7	76	45	+31	69	Qualification for the Europa Conference League second qualifying round
5	Başakşehir	36	18	8	10	54	37	+17	62	
6	Trabzonspor	36	17	6	13	64	54	+10	57	
7	Fatih Karagümrük	36	13	12	11	75	63	+12	51	

Source: Süper Lig
Rules for classification: 1) Points; 2) Head-to-head points; 3) Head-to-head goal difference; 4) Head-to-head goals scored; 5) Goal difference; 6) Goals scored; 7) Play-off.

==== Results summary ====
Overall								Home						Away					
Pld	W	D	L	GF	GA	GD	Pts	W	D	L	GF	GA	GD	W	D	L	GF	GA	GD
36	18	8	10	54	37	+17	62	12	2	4	31	17	+14	6	6	6	23	20	+3

Source: Spor Toto Süper Lig

==== Results by round ====
Round	1	2	3	4	5	6	7	8	9	10	11	12	13	14	15	16	17	18	19	20	21	22	23	24	25	26	27	28	29	30	31	32	33	34	35	36	37	38
Ground	H	A	H		H	A	H	A	H	H	A	H	A	H	A	H	A	H	A	A	H	A		A	H	A	H	A	A	H	A	H	A	H	A	H	A	H
Result	W	D	W	B	W	W	D	W	L	W	L	W	D	L	W	W	D	W	L	W	W	L	B	L	L	D	W	D	L	L	W	W	L	D	D	W	W	W
Position	1	4	2	6	4	2	3	1	5	3	4	2	2	5	4	3	3	3	3	3	3	4	4	5	6	6	6	5	5	5	5	5	5	5	5	5	5	5

Source: Spor Toto Süper Lig
A = Away; H = Home; B = Bye; W = Win; D = Draw; L = Loss

==== Matches ====
The league schedule was released on 4 July.

8 August 2022 1	İstanbul Başakşehir	4–0	Kasımpaşa	Istanbul
19:15 TRT (UTC+3)	Tekdemir (yellow card) 13'; Aleksić 22'; Ndayishimiye (yellow card) 23'; Szysz 38'; Chouiar 74'; Türüç 77' (pen.)	Report	Hajradinović (yellow card) 15'; Özcan (yellow card) 51'; Petretta (yellow card) 76'	Stadium: Fatih Terim Stadium; Attendance: 1,849; Referee: Ali Palabıyık

15 August 2022 2	Konyaspor	0–0	İstanbul Başakşehir	Eskişehir
19:15 TRT (UTC+3)	Calvo (yellow card) 58'	Report	Tekdemir (yellow card) 62'; Şahiner (yellow card) 73'; Biglia (yellow card) 73'	Stadium: New Eskişehir Stadium; Attendance: 2,666; Referee: Sarper Barış Saka

21 August 2022 3	İstanbul Başakşehir	2–0	Kayserispor	Istanbul
19:15 TRT (UTC+3)	Chadli 22'; Özcan 49'	Report		Stadium: Fatih Terim Stadium; Referee: Yaşar Kemal Uğurlu

4	Bye

3 September 2022 5	İstanbul Başakşehir	2–0	Alanyaspor	Istanbul
19:15 TRT (UTC+3)	Gürler 23'; Okaka (yellow card) 72'; Kény 85'	Report	Güneş (yellow card) 45+1'; Fer (yellow card) 65'; Pereira (yellow card) 90+3'	Stadium: Fatih Terim Stadium; Attendance: 2,073; Referee: Ali Şansalan

12 September 2022 6	Beşiktaş	0–1	İstanbul Başakşehir	Istanbul
19:00 TRT (UTC+3)	Uçan (yellow card) 58'; Saïss (yellow card) 86'; Sanuç (yellow card) 90+4'	Report	Caiçara (yellow card) 63'; Traoré 71'; Duarte (yellow card) 76'; Ndayishimiye (yellow card) 82'; Türüç (yellow card) 90'; Okaka (yellow card) 90+4'	Stadium: Vodafone Park; Attendance: 35,288; Referee: Halil Umut Meler

18 September 2022 7	İstanbul Başakşehir	0–0	Fatih Karagümrük	Istanbul
17:00 TRT (UTC+3)	Tekdemir (red card) 90+3'	Report	Ozdoyev (yellow card) 56'; Shukurov (yellow card) 66' (yellow card) 90+5' (red card)	Stadium: Fatih Terim Stadium; Attendance: 2,350; Referee: Bahattin Şimşek

1 October 2022 8	Ankaragücü	1–2	İstanbul Başakşehir	Ankara
17:00 TRT (UTC+3)	Ciğerci 55' (pen.) (yellow card) 57'	Report	Okaka 3'; Şahiner (yellow card) 28'; Kény (yellow card) 78'; Türüç 81'	Stadium: Eryaman Stadium; Attendance: 10,400; Referee: Arda Kardeşler

10 October 2022 9	İstanbul Başakşehir	0–2	Sivasspor	Istanbul
20:00 TRT (UTC+3)	Ndayishimiye (yellow card) 69'; Traoré (yellow card) 90+3'	Report	Saba 45+2' (pen.), 85'	Stadium: Fatih Terim Stadium; Attendance: 2,329; Referee: Kadir Sağlam

16 October 2022 10	İstanbul Başakşehir	2–0	İstanbulspor	Istanbul
17:00 TRT (UTC+3)	Ndayishimiye 26', 78' (yellow card) 82'; Biglia (yellow card) 44'; Türüç (yellow card) 74'; Caiçara (yellow card) 90+1'	Report	Yeşil (yellow card) 35'	Stadium: Fatih Terim Stadium; Attendance: 1,302; Referee: Erkan Özdamar

22 October 2022 11	Fenerbahçe	1–0	İstanbul Başakşehir	Istanbul
20:00 TRT (UTC+3)	Kahveci (yellow card) 62'; Rossi 84'	Report	Türüç (yellow card) 61'; Tekdemir (yellow card) 69'	Stadium: Şükrü Saracoğlu Stadium; Attendance: 42,079; Referee: Zorbay Küçük

31 October 2022 12	İstanbul Başakşehir	3–1	Giresunspor	Istanbul
20:00 TRT (UTC+3)	Ndayishimiye 38' (yellow card) 44'; Kény 65'; Şahiner 76'	Report	Piçinciol (yellow card) 50'; Sainz (yellow card) 57'; Serginho 80'	Stadium: Fatih Terim Stadium; Attendance: 2,353; Referee: Mert Güzenge

7 November 2022 13	Hatayspor	3–3	İstanbul Başakşehir	Hatay
20:00 TRT (UTC+3)	Yıldırım 12'; Vranješ (yellow card) 74'; El Kaabi 75'; Adekugbe (yellow card) 80'; Zé Luís 81'; Boudjemaa (yellow card) 90+1'	Report	Youssouf Ndayishimiye (yellow card) 42'; Aleksić (yellow card) 45+5' (goal) 65'; Chouiar (yellow card) 56'; Traoré 60'; Gürler 90+1'	Stadium: New Hatay Stadium; Attendance: 6,261; Referee: Suat Arslanboğa

12 November 2022 14	İstanbul Başakşehir	0–7	Galatasaray	Istanbul
20:00 TRT (UTC+3)	Ndayishimiye (yellow card) 44'; Aleksić (yellow card) 83'	Report	Aktürkoğlu 14', 59', 85'; Icardi 45' (pen.); Ndayishimiye 45+3' (o.g.); Mertens 65'; Rashica (yellow card) 74'; Muslera (yellow card) 76'; Bardakcı 88'	Stadium: Fatih Terim Stadium; Attendance: 7,771; Referee: Atilla Karaoğlan

23 December 2022 15	Ümraniyespor	1–3	İstanbul Başakşehir	Istanbul
20:00 TRT (UTC+3)	Nayir 17' (yellow card) 40'; Atasayar (yellow card) 28'; Ayık (yellow card) 80'	Report	Aleksić 2'; Gürler (yellow card) 45+5' (goal) 57'; Ndayishimiye 90+3'	Stadium: Ümraniye Municipality City Stadium; Attendance: 1,185; Referee: Arda Kardeşler

27 December 2022 16	İstanbul Başakşehir	2–0	Antalyaspor	Istanbul
17:00 TRT (UTC+3)	Tekdemir (yellow card) 33'; Türüç 57'; Aleksić 66'; Duarte (yellow card) 82'	Report	Balcı (yellow card) 66'; Kudryashov (yellow card) 88'	Stadium: Fatih Terim Stadium; Attendance: 833; Referee: Halil Umut Meler

5 January 2023 17	Gaziantep	1–1	İstanbul Başakşehir	Gaziantep
17:00 TRT (UTC+3)	Maxim (yellow card) 45+4' (goal) 90+7'; Marković (yellow card) 73'	Report	Özcan 44'	Stadium: Gaziantep Stadium; Attendance: 2,471; Referee: Abdulkadir Bitigen

9 January 2023 18	İstanbul Başakşehir	2–1	Adana Demirspor	Istanbul
17:00 TRT (UTC+3)	Tekdemir (yellow card) 19'; Touba (yellow card) 28'; Türüç 52' (pen.); Gürler 62'; Okaka (yellow card) MS'	Report	Rodrigues (yellow card) 51'; Belhanda (yellow card) 52'; Akaydin 58' (yellow card) 90'	Stadium: Fatih Terim Stadium; Attendance: 1,899; Referee: Arda Kardeşler

14 January 2023 19	Trabzonspor	1–0	İstanbul Başakşehir	Trabzon
19:00 TRT (UTC+3)	Bakasetas 21'; Peres (yellow card) 77'	Report	Gürler (yellow card) 64'; Okaka (yellow card) 85' (yellow-red card) 90+6'; Ndayishimiye (yellow card) 90+5'	Stadium: Şenol Güneş Sports Complex; Attendance: 29,767; Referee: Ali Şansalan

21 January 2023 20	Kasımpaşa	1–3	İstanbul Başakşehir	Istanbul
16:00 TRT (UTC+3)	Özcan 16'; Hajradinović (yellow card) 36'; Ouanes (yellow card) 47' (yellow card) 90+8' (red card); Kalkan (yellow card) 85'; Kara (yellow card) 90+7'; Eysseric (yellow card) 90+11'	Report	Aleksić 48'; Tekdemir (yellow card) 72'; Türüç 90+9' (pen.); Szysz 90+11'	Stadium: Recep Tayyip Erdoğan Stadium; Attendance: 1,910; Referee: Turgut Doman

29 January 2023 21	İstanbul Başakşehir	2–0	Konyaspor	Istanbul
19:00 TRT (UTC+3)	Özcan 43'; Türüç 64' (pen.)	Report		Stadium: Fatih Terim Stadium; Attendance: 1,833; Referee: Suat Arslanboğa

2 February 2023 22	Kayserispor	1–0	İstanbul Başakşehir	Kayseri
17:00 TRT (UTC+3)	Kemen (yellow card) 27'; Carole (yellow card) 45+5'; Karimi 49'	Report	Karzev (yellow card) 79'	Stadium: Kadir Has Stadium; Referee: Kadir Sağlam

23	Bye

3 March 2023 24	Alanyaspor	1–0	İstanbul Başakşehir	Antalya
20:00 TRT (UTC+3)	Bekiroğlu 54'; Fer (red card) 69'; Rúnarsson (yellow card) 90+3'	Report	Lima (yellow card) 59'; Türüç (yellow card) 74'	Stadium: Kırbıyık Holding Stadium; Referee: Zorbay Küçük

12 March 2023 25	İstanbul Başakşehir	0–2	Beşiktaş	Istanbul
19:00 TRT (UTC+3)	Januzaj (red card) 35'	Report	Colley (yellow card) 6'; Aboubakar 15'; Masuaku 55'; Hadžiahmetović (yellow card) 70'	Stadium: Fatih Terim Stadium; Referee: Mete Kalkavan

19 March 2023 26	Fatih Karagümrük	2–2	İstanbul Başakşehir	Istanbul
16:00 TRT (UTC+3)	Baniya (yellow card) 9'; Borini 45+4'; Shukurov (yellow card) 74'; Diagne 90+2'	Report	Duarte (yellow card) 8'; Aleksić 42'; Gürler 90+1'	Stadium: Atatürk Olympic Stadium; Referee: Tugay Kaan Numanoğlu

1 April 2023 27	İstanbul Başakşehir	1–0	Ankaragücü	Istanbul
16:00 TRT (UTC+3)	Gürler 36'; Danijel Aleksić (yellow card) 44'; Figueiredo (yellow card) 47'; Touba (yellow card) 69'	Report	Kılınç (yellow card) 40'; Sowe 44'; Diack (penalty missed) 58'	Stadium: Fatih Terim Stadium; Referee: Abdulkadir Bitigen

9 April 2023 28	Sivasspor	1–1	İstanbul Başakşehir	Sivas
16:00 TRT (UTC+3)	Duarte 37' (o.g.); Erdal (yellow card) 85'; Appindangoyé (yellow card) 90+2'	Report	Szysz 61'	Stadium: New Sivas 4 Eylül Stadium; Referee: Arda Kardeşler

15 April 2023 29	İstanbulspor	1–0	İstanbul Başakşehir	Istanbul
16:00 TRT (UTC+3)	Duhaney (yellow card) 24'; Eze 45+7'; Ba (yellow card) 90+5'	Report	Biglia (yellow card) 38'; Gürler (yellow card) 45+6'; Tekdemir (yellow card) 71'; Figueiredo (yellow card) 90'; Erkin (yellow card) 90+3'; Şahiner (yellow card) 90+5'	Stadium: Necmi Kadıoğlu Stadium; Referee: Mert Güzenge

19 April 2023 30	İstanbul Başakşehir	1–2	Fenerbahçe	Istanbul
20:30 TRT (UTC+3)	Aleksić 30', (yellow card) 74'; Szysz (yellow card) 45+1'; Biglia (yellow card) 50'; Şahiner (yellow card) 50' (yellow-red card) 90+7'; Touba (yellow card) 67' (yellow-red card) 70'; Tekdemir (yellow card) 82'; Şengezer (yellow card) 85'	Report	João Pedro 88', 90+3'	Stadium: Fatih Terim Stadium; Referee: Suat Arslanboğa

24 April 2023 31	Giresunspor	2–4	İstanbul Başakşehir	Giresun
17:00 TRT (UTC+3)	Mejía (yellow card) 62'; Sainz 63', 90'; Davas (yellow card) 73'	Report	Januzaj 16', 35'; Figueiredo 25', 45+2'; Ié (yellow card) 37'; Türüç (yellow card) 62'; Şengezer (yellow card) 79'	Stadium: Çotanak Sports Complex; Referee: Zorbay Küçük

32	İstanbul Başakşehir	3–0	Hatayspor	Istanbul
		Report		Stadium: Fatih Terim Stadium

8 May 2023 33	Galatasaray	1–0	İstanbul Başakşehir	Istanbul
20:00 TRT (UTC+3)	Boey (yellow card) 38'; Icardi 45+7' (pen.); Torreira (yellow card) 60'	Report	Biglia (yellow card) 10'	Stadium: Nef Stadium; Referee: Halil Umut Meler

17 May 2023 34	İstanbul Başakşehir	1–1	Ümraniyespor	Istanbul
17:00 TRT (UTC+3)	Aleksić 4'; Tekdemir (red card) 7'; Özcan (yellow card) 65'; Lima (yellow card) 71'	Report	Özdemir (yellow card) 45+3'; Nayir 60' (pen.)	Stadium: Fatih Terim Stadium; Referee: Burak Pakkan

21 May 2023 35	Antalyaspor	0–0	İstanbul Başakşehir	Antalya
19:00 TRT (UTC+3)		Report	Biglia (yellow card) 73'; Kaygısız (yellow card) 90+3'	Stadium: Antalya Stadium; Referee: Cihan Aydın

36	İstanbul Başakşehir	3–0	Gaziantep	Istanbul
		Report		Stadium: Fatih Terim Stadium

3 June 2023 37	Adana Demirspor	2–3	İstanbul Başakşehir	Adana
19:00 TRT (UTC+3)	Stambouli 7'; Rodrigues (yellow card) 32'; Morel 48'	Report	Kény 10', 86'; Figueiredo 26'; Januzaj (yellow card) 73'	Stadium: New Adana Stadium; Referee: Erkan Özdamar

6 June 2023 38	İstanbul Başakşehir	3–1	Trabzonspor	Istanbul
20:00 TRT (UTC+3)	Türüç 34'; Elmalı 48' (o.g.); Lima 79'	Report	Višća 62'	Stadium: Fatih Terim Stadium; Referee: Bahattin Şimşek

=== Turkish Cup ===
20 December 2022 Fifth round	İstanbul Başakşehir	3–1	Göztepe	Istanbul
19:00 TRT (UTC+3)	Gürler 21', 24'; Okaka 37'	Report	Malak 73'; Atanga (yellow card) 86'	Stadium: Fatih Terim Stadium; Referee: Zorbay Küçük

18 January 2023 Round of 16	Fatih Karagümrük	2–2 (a.e.t.) (3–5 p)	İstanbul Başakşehir	Istanbul
14:30 TRT (UTC+3)	Ugur (yellow card) 27'; Drešević (yellow card) 63'; Diagne 68'; Baniya (yellow card) 98'; Frei 115'; Biraschi (yellow card) 119'; Mercan (yellow card) 120'	Report	Mercan 71' (o.g.); Türüç 120+1' (pen.)	Stadium: Necmi Kadıoğlu Stadium; Referee: Mert Güzenge
	Penalties
	Kazim-Richards (penalty scored); Drešević (penalty scored); Biraschi (penalty missed); Shukurov (penalty scored)		(penalty scored) Türüç; (penalty scored) Lima; (penalty scored) Özcan; (penalty scored) Ndayishimiye; (penalty scored) Caiçara

5 April 2023 Quarter-finals	Galatasaray	2–3	İstanbul Başakşehir	Istanbul
20:30 TRT (UTC+3)	Ayhan 20'; Icardi 51'	Report	Szysz 12', 66'; Tekdemir (yellow card) 16'; Aleksić 30'; Biglia (yellow card) 90+4'	Stadium: Nef Stadium; Referee: Kadir Sağlam

4 May 2023 Semi-finals first leg	İstanbul Başakşehir	1–0	Ankaragücü	Istanbul
20:30 TRT (UTC+3)	Aleksić (yellow card) 4'; Touba (red card) 43'; Biglia (yellow card) 55'; Erkin (yellow card) 72'; Şengezer (yellow card) 78'; Figueiredo 90+5'	Report	(yellow card) 90+7' Malcuit	Stadium: Fatih Terim Stadium; Referee: Zorbay Küçük

25 May 2023 Semi-finals second leg	Ankaragücü	2–2 (a.e.t.) (2–3 agg.)	İstanbul Başakşehir	Ankara
20:30 TRT (UTC+3)	Sowe 11'; Diack (yellow card) 42'; Malcuit (yellow card) 63'; Chatzigiovanis 90'; Đokanović (yellow card) 90+2'; Mujakić (yellow card) 97' (yellow-red card) 97'; Kılınç (yellow card) 120+3'	Report	Şahiner (yellow card) 38'; Türüç (yellow card) 46'; Gürler 61'; Kény 111'; Şengezer (yellow card) 115'	Stadium: Eryaman Stadium; Referee: Ali Şansalan

11 June 2023 Final	Fenerbahçe	2–0	İstanbul Başakşehir	İzmir
20:45 TRT (UTC+3)	Batshuayi 1', 29'; Zajc (yellow card) 14'; Aziz (yellow card) 88'	Report	Türüç (yellow card) 67'; Kény (yellow card) 88'	Stadium: Gürsel Aksel Stadium; Attendance: 12,182; Referee: Atilla Karaoğlan

=== UEFA Europa Conference League ===
==== Second qualifying round ====
The draw for the second qualifying round was held on 15 June 2022.

21 July 2022 First leg	İstanbul Başakşehir (Turkey)	1–1	(Israel) Maccabi Netanya	Istanbul
20:45 TRT (UTC+3)	Szysz 81'	Report	Itzhak 2'	Stadium: Başakşehir Fatih Terim Stadium; Attendance: 2,776; Referee: Irakli Kvirikashvili (Georgia)

28 July 2022 Second leg	Maccabi Netanya (Israel)	0–1 (1–2 agg.)	(Turkey) İstanbul Başakşehir	Netanya
19:45 IDT (UTC+3)		Report	Ndayishimiye 9'	Stadium: Netanya Stadium; Attendance: 11,400; Referee: Dario Bel (Croatia)

==== Third qualifying round ====
The draw for the third qualifying round was held on 18 July 2022.

4 August 2022 First leg	Breiðablik (Iceland)	1–3	(Turkey) Başakşehir	Kópavogur, Iceland
18:45 WET (UTC±0)	V. Einarsson 63'	Report	Aleksić 38', 90+2'; Türüç 52'	Stadium: Kópavogsvöllur; Attendance: 1,283; Referee: Petri Viljanen (Finland)

11 August 2022 Second leg	İstanbul Başakşehir (Turkey)	3–0 (6–1 agg.)	(Iceland) Breiðablik	Istanbul
20:45 TRT (UTC+3)	Okaka 44'; Touba 74'; Aleksić 84'	Report		Stadium: Fatih Terim Stadium; Attendance: 2,401; Referee: Tamás Bognár (Hungary)

==== Play-off round ====
The draw for the play-off round was held on 2 August 2022.

18 August 2022 First leg	İstanbul Başakşehir (Turkey)	1–1	(Belgium) Antwerp	Istanbul
20:45 TRT (UTC+3)	Chouiar 54'	Report	Almeida 88'	Stadium: Fatih Terim Stadium; Attendance: 3,450; Referee: Jérôme Brisard (France)

25 August 2022 Second leg	Antwerp (Belgium)	1–3 (2–4 agg.)	(Turkey) İstanbul Başakşehir	Antwerp, Belgium
20:45 CEST (UTC+2)	Frey 56' (pen.)	Report	Özcan 8'; Okaka 58'; Aleksić 83'	Stadium: Bosuilstadion; Attendance: 12,955; Referee: Manuel Schüttengruber (Austria)

==== Group stage ====
The draw for the group stage was held on 26 August 2022.

Pos	Team	Pld	W	D	L	GF	GA	GD	Pts	Qualification	IBS	FIO	HEA	RFS
1	(Turkey) İstanbul Başakşehir	6	4	1	1	14	3	+11	13 (Note: Tied on head-to-head points. Head-to-head goal difference: İstanbul Başakşehir +2, Fiorentina −2.)	Advance to round of 16	—	3–0	3–1	3–0
2	(Italy) Fiorentina	6	4	1	1	14	6	+8	13	Advance to knockout round play-offs	2–1	—	5–1	1–1
3	(Scotland) Heart of Midlothian	6	2	0	4	6	16	−10	6		0–4	0–3	—	2–1
4	(Latvia) RFS	6	0	2	4	2	11	−9	2		0–0	0–3	0–2	—

Source: UEFA
Rules for classification: Group stage tiebreakers
Notes:

8 September 2022 1	Heart of Midlothian (Scotland)	0–4	(Turkey) İstanbul Başakşehir	Edinburgh, Scotland
17:45 BST (UTC+1)		Report	Kaldırım 26'; Ndayishimiye 67'; Okaka 75'; Özcan 82'	Stadium: Tynecastle Park; Attendance: 15,131; Referee: Krzysztof Jakubik (Poland)

15 September 2022 2	İstanbul Başakşehir (Turkey)	3–0	(Italy) Fiorentina	Istanbul
22:00 TRT (UTC+3)	Gürler 57', 71'; Traoré 90'	Report	Ikoné (yellow card) 22' (yellow-red card) 76'; Amrabat (yellow card) 61'	Stadium: Başakşehir Fatih Terim Stadium; Attendance: 5,857; Referee: Guillermo Cuadra Fernández (Spain)

6 October 2022 3	RFS (Latvia)	0–0	(Turkey) İstanbul Başakşehir	Riga, Latvia
22:00 EEST (UTC+3)		Report		Stadium: Skonto Stadium; Attendance: 5,154; Referee: Radu Petrescu (Romania)
Note: RFS will play their home matches at Skonto Stadium, Riga, instead of their regular stadium, LNK Sporta Parks, Riga, which did not meet UEFA requirements.

13 October 2022 4	İstanbul Başakşehir (Turkey)	3–0	(Latvia) RFS	Istanbul
19:45 TRT (UTC+3)	Türüç 11'; Okaka 45', 72'	Report		Stadium: Başakşehir Fatih Terim Stadium; Attendance: 3,080; Referee: Philip Farrugia (Malta)

27 October 2022 5	Fiorentina (Italy)	2–1	(Turkey) İstanbul Başakşehir	Florence, Italy
18:45 CEST (UTC+2)	Jović 26', 61'; Milenković (yellow card) 32'; Mandragora (yellow card) 86'	Report	Aleksić 14'; Okaka (yellow card) 34'; Chouiar (yellow card) 39'; Türüç (yellow card) 67'	Stadium: Stadio Artemio Franchi; Attendance: 14,345; Referee: Allard Lindhout (Netherlands)

3 November 2022 6	İstanbul Başakşehir (Turkey)	3–1	(Scotland) Heart of Midlothian	Istanbul
18:30 TRT (UTC+3)	Ndayishimiye 4'; Gürler 33'; Özcan 64'	Report	Atkinson 90'	Stadium: Başakşehir Fatih Terim Stadium; Attendance: 4,824; Referee: Goga Kikacheishvili (Georgia)

==== Round of 16 ====
9 March 2023 First leg	Gent (Belgium)	1–1	(Turkey) İstanbul Başakşehir	Ghent, Belgium
	Orban 35'	Report	Okaka 16'	Stadium: Ghelamco Arena; Attendance: 11,334; Referee: Kristo Tohver (Estonia)

15 March 2023 Second leg	İstanbul Başakşehir (Turkey)	1–4 (2–5 agg.)	(Belgium) Gent	Istanbul
	Januzaj 88'	Report	Orban 31', 32', 34'; Cuypers 37'	Stadium: Başakşehir Fatih Terim Stadium; Attendance: 8,216; Referee: Benoît Bastien (France)
