= 2020–21 İstanbul Başakşehir F.K. season =

İstanbul Başakşehir
2020–21 season
- President: Göksel Gümüşdağ
- Head coach: Okan Buruk (until 29 January); Aykut Kocaman (from 1 February)
- Stadium: Başakşehir Fatih Terim Stadium
- Süper Lig: 12th
- Turkish Cup: Semi-finals
- Turkish Super Cup: Runners-up
- UEFA Champions League: Group stage
- Top goalscorer: League: Fredrik Gulbrandsen (7); All: Fredrik Gulbrandsen (11)
Home colours	Away colours	Third colours

The 2020–21 season was the 31st season in existence of İstanbul Başakşehir and the seventh consecutive season in the top flight of Turkish football, the Süper Lig. In addition to the domestic league, Başakşehir participated in this season's editions of the Turkish Cup, the Turkish Super Cup and the UEFA Champions League. The season covered the period from 5 August 2020 to 30 June 2021.

== Players ==
=== First-team squad ===
As of 1 February 2021

Note: Flags indicate national team as defined under FIFA eligibility rules; some limited exceptions apply. Players may hold more than one non-FIFA nationality.

No.	Pos.	Nation	Player
1	GK	TUR	Volkan Babacan
2	DF	BRA	Léo Duarte (on loan from Milan)
3	DF	TUR	Hasan Ali Kaldırım
4	DF	BRA	Rafael
5	MF	TUR	Mehmet Topal
6	DF	MDA	Alexandru Epureanu
7	MF	BIH	Edin Višća (Vice-captain)
8	MF	SRB	Danijel Aleksić
9	FW	CHI	Junior Fernandes
10	MF	TUR	Berkay Özcan
11	MF	BEL	Nacer Chadli
13	GK	TUR	Ahmet Kıvanç
14	MF	NGR	Azubuike Okechukwu
19	FW	SEN	Demba Ba
20	MF	BRA	Giuliano
21	MF	TUR	Mahmut Tekdemir (Captain)

No.	Pos.	Nation	Player
22	FW	NOR	Fredrik Gulbrandsen
23	MF	TUR	Deniz Türüç (on loan from Fenerbahçe)
24	DF	TUR	Ravil Tagir
25	DF	TUR	Muhammed Sarıkaya
26	DF	CPV	Ponck
27	FW	FRA	Enzo Crivelli
28	MF	TUR	Tolga Ciğerci
33	DF	TUR	Uğur Uçar
34	GK	TUR	Mert Günok
42	MF	TUR	Ömer Ali Şahiner
55	MF	BDI	Youssouf Ndayishimiye
63	DF	BEL	Boli Bolingoli-Mbombo (on loan from Celtic)
70	FW	TUR	Mete Kaan Demir
80	DF	BRA	Júnior Caiçara
88	DF	TUR	Cemali Sertel

=== Out on loan ===
Note: Flags indicate national team as defined under FIFA eligibility rules; some limited exceptions apply. Players may hold more than one non-FIFA nationality.

No.	Pos.	Nation	Player
4	DF	GHA	Joseph Attamah (at Kayserispor)
14	FW	TUR	Muhammet Demir (at Gaziantep)
18	FW	TUR	Muhammet Arslantaş (at Boluspor)
20	MF	TUR	Soner Aydoğdu (at Göztepe)
23	DF	AUS	Aziz Behich (at Kayserispor)
24	DF	POR	Miguel Vieira (at Waasland-Beveren)
97	MF	TUR	Alican Özfesli (at Boluspor)
—	DF	TUR	Yusuf Avcılar (at Orduspor)

No.	Pos.	Nation	Player
—	DF	TUR	Muharrem Öner (at Esenler Erokspor)
—	DF	TUR	Mustafa Kutay Pekşen (at Bayrampaşa)
—	MF	TUR	Abdulkadir Çelik (at Somaspor)
—	DF	AZE	Mert Çelik (at Neftçi Baku)
—	MF	BEL	Ange Belibi (at Boluspor)
—	MF	TUR	Salim Farsak (at KF Shkupi)
—	FW	TUR	Atabey Çiçek (at KVC Westerlo)

== Transfers ==
=== In ===
No.	Pos	Player	Transferred from	Fee	Date	Source
11	MF	(Belgium) Nacer Chadli	Monaco	Undisclosed	10 September 2020	

=== Out ===
No.	Pos	Player	Transferred to	Fee	Date	Source
3	DF	(France) Gaël Clichy	(Switzerland) Servette	Free	2 December 2020	

== Pre-season and friendlies ==
Win Draw Loss

3 September 2020 Friendly	Kasımpaşa (Turkey)	2–2	(Turkey) İstanbul Başakşehir	Istanbul, Turkey
19:00 TRT (UTC+3)	Erdoğan 21'; Pavelka 50'	Report	Ba 43', 82' (pen.)	Stadium: Recep Tayyip Erdoğan Stadium

6 September 2020 Friendly	Fatih Karagümrük (Turkey)	1–2	(Turkey) İstanbul Başakşehir	Istanbul, Turkey
21:00 TRT (UTC+3)	Camara 60'	Report	Ba 81'; Karakuş 90'	Stadium: Başakşehir Futbol Kulübü Altyapı Tesisleri

11 October 2020 Friendly	Kasımpaşa (Turkey)	0–5	(Turkey) İstanbul Başakşehir	Istanbul, Turkey
17:00 TRT (UTC+3)		Report	Ba 10'; Crivelli 40'; Topal 57'; Gulbrandsen 65'; Kahveci 68' (pen.)	Stadium: Kasimpaşaspor Kemerburgaz Tesisleri

15 November 2020 Friendly	İstanbul Başakşehir (Turkey)	1–3	(Turkey) İstanbulspor	Istanbul, Turkey
16:00 TRT (UTC+3)	Giuliano 34' (pen.)	Report	Yılmaz 17'; Cumur 47'; Ergün 53' (pen.)	Stadium: Başakşehir 3 Nolu Saha; Attendance: 0

== Competitions ==
=== Overview ===
Competition	First match	Last match	Starting round	Final position	Record							
Competition	First match	Last match	Starting round	Final position	Pld	W	D	L	GF	GA	GD	Win %
Süper Lig	14 September 2020	15 May 2021	Matchday 1	12th	40	12	12	16	43	55	−12	30.00
Turkish Cup	17 December 2020	16 March 2021	Fifth round	Semi-finals	4	3	0	1	16	5	+11	75.00
Turkish Super Cup	27 January 2021		Final	Runners-up	1	0	0	1	1	2	−1	0.00
Champions League	20 October 2020	9 December 2020	Group stage	Group stage	6	1	0	5	7	18	−11	16.67
Total					51	16	12	23	67	80	−13	31.37

Last updated: 15 May 2021
Source: Soccerway

=== Süper Lig ===
==== League table ====
Pos	Team	Pld	W	D	L	GF	GA	GD	Pts
10	Göztepe	40	13	12	15	59	59	0	51
11	Konyaspor	40	12	14	14	49	48	+1	50
12	Başakşehir	40	12	12	16	43	55	−12	48
13	Çaykur Rizespor	40	12	12	16	53	69	−16	48
14	Kasımpaşa	40	12	10	18	47	57	−10	46

Source: Süper Lig, Soccerway
Rules for classification: 1) Points; 2) Head-to-head points; 3) Head-to-head goal difference; 4) Head-to-head goals scored; 5) Goal difference; 6) Goals scored; 7) Play-off.

==== Results summary ====
Overall								Home						Away					
Pld	W	D	L	GF	GA	GD	Pts	W	D	L	GF	GA	GD	W	D	L	GF	GA	GD
40	12	12	16	43	55	−12	48	5	8	7	26	28	−2	7	4	9	17	27	−10

Last updated: 15 May 2021.
Source: Süper Lig

==== Results by round ====
Round	1	2	3	4	5	6	7	8	9	10	11	12	13	14	15	16	17	18	19	20	21	22	23	24	25	26	27	28	29	30	31	32	33	34	35	36	37	38	39	40	41	42
Ground	A	H	A	H	A	H	A	H	A	H	A	H	B	A	H	A	H	A	H	A	H	H	A	H	A	H	A	H	A	H	A	H	A	B	H	A	H	A	H	A	H	A
Result	L	L	L	D	W	W	W	W	L	D	D	L	B	L	D	L	W	W	D	L	D	L	L	L	L	L	D	D	W	L	D	W	L	B	L	W	D	W	W	D	D	W
Position	18	21	21	21	20	11	9	5	8	10	9	12	14	16	16	16	15	12	12	14	15	15	16	17	18	18	17	17	16	18	17	15	17	17	18	17	17	15	14	14	15	12

Updated to match(es) played on 15 May 2021. Source: Süper Lig
A = Away; H = Home; B = Bye; W = Win; D = Draw; L = Loss

Note: Since the league was expanded to 21 teams each team earned a bye twice this season.

==== Matches ====
14 September 2020 1	Hatayspor	2–0	İstanbul Başakşehir	Antakya
20:00 TRT (UTC+3)	Ilgaz 36'; Ribeiro (yellow card) 89'; Barbosa 90+1'	Report	Caiçara (yellow card) 29'; Škrtel (yellow card) 54'	Stadium: Antakya Atatürk Stadyumu; Attendance: 0 Referee: Mete Kalkavan

20 September 2020 2	İstanbul Başakşehir	0–2	Galatasaray	Istanbul
19:00 TRT (UTC+3)	Epureanu (yellow card) 39'; Tekdemir (yellow card) 45'; Ba (yellow card) 66'	Report	Falcao 14' (pen.); Belhanda 76'; Antalyalı (yellow card) 86'	Stadium: Başakşehir Fatih Terim Stadium; Attendance: 0 Referee: Atilla Karaoğlan

25 September 2020 3	Fatih Karagümrük	2–0	İstanbul Başakşehir	Istanbul
20:00 TRT (UTC+3)	Biglia (yellow card) 14'; Roco 47'; Sabo 90'; Altınay (yellow card) 90+4'	Report	Frei (yellow card) 29'; Kahveci (yellow card) 68' (yellow-red card) 82'	Stadium: Atatürk Olympic Stadium; Attendance: 0 Referee: Ali Şansalan

3 October 2020 4	İstanbul Başakşehir	0–0	Göztepe	Istanbul
16:00 TRT (UTC+3)		Report		Stadium: Başakşehir Fatih Terim Stadium; Attendance: 0 Referee: Özgür Yankaya

17 October 2020 5	Trabzonspor	0–2	İstanbul Başakşehir	Trabzon
19:00 TRT (UTC+3)	Kınalı (yellow card) 52'	Report	Kahveci 32'; Višća 54'; Bolingoli-Mbombo (yellow card) 55'	Stadium: Şenol Güneş Stadium; Attendance: 299; Referee: Bahattin Şimşek

24 October 2020 6	İstanbul Başakşehir	5–1	Antalyaspor	Istanbul
19:00 TRT (UTC+3)	Višća 11' (pen.), 23'; Kahveci 27'; Crivelli 35'; Giuliano 83'	Report	Podolski 14'	Stadium: Başakşehir Fatih Terim Stadium; Attendance: 0 Referee: Ali Palabıyık

1 November 2020 7	Konyaspor	1–2	İstanbul Başakşehir	Konya
16:00 TRT (UTC+3)	Kravets 69'	Report	Jevtović 45' (o.g.); Aleksić 58'	Stadium: Konya Büyükşehir Stadium; Attendance: 0 Referee: Halil Umut Meler

8 November 2020 8	İstanbul Başakşehir	2–1	Gençlerbirliği	Istanbul
16:00 TRT (UTC+3)	Gulbrandsen 80'; Topal 90+4'	Report	Yılmaz 1'	Stadium: Başakşehir Fatih Terim Stadium; Attendance: 0 Referee: Mustafa Öğretmenoğlu

21 November 2020 9	Beşiktaş	3–2	İstanbul Başakşehir	Istanbul
19:00 TRT (UTC+3)	Hutchinson 44'; Larin (yellow card) 45', (goal) 45+1'; Bernard (yellow card) 58'; Toköz (yellow card) 67'; Aboubakar 72' (pen.)	Report	Bolingoli (yellow card) 42'; Topal (yellow card) 55' (yellow-red card) 70'; Rafael (yellow card) 77'; Gulbrandsen 81', 90+4'; Škrtel (yellow card) 90+6'	Stadium: Vodafone Park; Attendance: 0 Referee: Ümit Öztürk

28 November 2020 10	İstanbul Başakşehir	3–3	Denizlispor	Istanbul
16:00 TRT (UTC+3)	Gulbrandsen 11', 21'; Ba 59'; Chadli (yellow card) 90'; Škrtel (yellow card) 90+6'	Report	Lopes (yellow card) 20'; Özdemir 62'; Rodallega 90+2'; Murawski 90+7' (pen.)	Stadium: Başakşehir Fatih Terim Stadium; Attendance: 0 Referee: Arda Kardeşler

5 December 2020 11	Yeni Malatyaspor	1–1	İstanbul Başakşehir	Malatya
16:00 TRT (UTC+3)	Ponck 50' (o.g.); Büyük (yellow card) 57'; Tetteh (yellow card) 82'; Topalli (yellow card) 87'	Report	Gulbrandsen (yellow card) 26'; Kahveci (yellow card) 38'; Giuliano 45+1'	Stadium: Malatya Arena; Attendance: 0 Referee: Cüneyt Çakır

13 December 2020 12	İstanbul Başakşehir	1–2	Gaziantep	Istanbul
16:00 TRT (UTC+3)	Crivelli 56'	Report	Mirallas 44'; Demir 74'	Stadium: Başakşehir Fatih Terim Stadium; Attendance: 0 Referee: Abdulkadir Bitigen

13	Bye

23 December 2020 14	Fenerbahçe	4–1	İstanbul Başakşehir	Istanbul
19:00 TRT (UTC+3)	Luiz Gustavo (yellow card) 12', (goal) 84'; Sangaré 45+2'; Erkin (yellow card) 50'; Tisserand 60'; Yandaş 89'	Report	Tekdemir (yellow card) 6', (goal) 61'; Rafael (yellow card) 70' (yellow-red card) 70'; Kahveci (yellow card) 74' (yellow-red card) 74'	Stadium: Şükrü Saracoğlu Stadium; Attendance: 0 Referee: Bahattin Şimşek

27 December 2020 15	İstanbul Başakşehir	2–2	Kasımpaşa	Istanbul
19:00 TRT (UTC+3)	Chadli 27'; Višća 90+2'	Report	Erdoğan 36'; Hodžić 84'	Stadium: Başakşehir Fatih Terim Stadium; Attendance: 0 Referee: Fırat Aydınus

2 January 2021 16	Alanyaspor	3–0	İstanbul Başakşehir	Alanya
16:00 TRT (UTC+3)	Bareiro 19'; Moubandje 27'; Bingöl 83'	Report		Stadium: Bahçeşehir Okulları Stadium; Attendance: 0 Referee: Mete Kalkavan

6 January 2021 17	İstanbul Başakşehir	1–0	BB Erzurumspor	Istanbul
16:00 TRT (UTC+3)	Gulbrandsen 40'	Report		Stadium: Başakşehir Fatih Terim Stadium; Attendance: 0 Referee: Yaşar Kemal Uğurlu

10 January 2021 18	Ankaragücü	1–2	İstanbul Başakşehir	Ankara
16:00 TRT (UTC+3)	Çekiçi 20'	Report	Višća 17'; Ba 56'	Stadium: Eryaman Stadium; Attendance: 0 Referee: Tugay Kaan Numanoglu

16 January 2021 19	İstanbul Başakşehir	1–1	Sivasspor	Istanbul
16:00 TRT (UTC+3)	Epureanu (yellow card) 20'; Aleksić 38'; Tekdemir (yellow card) 90+6'	Report	Yalçın (yellow card) 34'; Arslan 42'; Appindangoyé (yellow card) 90+5'	Stadium: Başakşehir Fatih Terim Stadium; Attendance: 0 Referee: Alper Ulusoy

19 January 2021 20	Kayserispor	2–0	İstanbul Başakşehir	Kayseri
16:00 TRT (UTC+3)	Alibec 42', 77'; Săpunaru (yellow card) 90+1'	Report		Stadium: Kadir Has Stadium; Attendance: 0 Referee: Serkan Tokat

23 January 2021 21	İstanbul Başakşehir	1–1	Çaykur Rizespor	Istanbul
19:00 TRT (UTC+3)	Topal 64'	Report	Samudio 48' (pen.)	Stadium: Başakşehir Fatih Terim Stadium; Attendance: 0 Referee: Ümit Öztürk

30 January 2021 22	İstanbul Başakşehir	1–5	Hatayspor	Istanbul
16:00 TRT (UTC+3)	Türüç (yellow card) 37'; Aleksić (yellow card) 67'; Kamara 80' (o.g.); Fernandes (yellow card) 90'	Report	Diouf 11', 57'; David 21' (pen.), (yellow card) 33'; Boupendza 43' (pen.), 68'	Stadium: Başakşehir Fatih Terim Stadium; Attendance: 0 Referee: Cüneyt Çakır

2 February 2021 23	Galatasaray	3–0	İstanbul Başakşehir	Istanbul
19:00 TRT (UTC+3)	Marcão (yellow card) 21'; Onyekuru 45'; Donk 64'; Mohamed 90+2' (pen.)	Report	Giuliano (penalty missed) 22'; Crivelli (yellow card) 41'; Türüç (yellow card) 43'	Stadium: Türk Telekom Stadium; Attendance: 0 Referee: Arda Kardeşler

6 February 2021 24	İstanbul Başakşehir	0–1	Fatih Karagümrük	Istanbul
16:00 TRT (UTC+3)	Giuliano (penalty missed) 19'; Okechukwu (yellow card) 84'	Report	Campi (yellow card) 35'; Durmaz 52'	Stadium: Başakşehir Fatih Terim Stadium; Attendance: 0 Referee: Halil Umut Meler

14 February 2021 25	Göztepe	2–1	İstanbul Başakşehir	Göztepe
16:00 TRT (UTC+3)	Nwobodo (yellow card) 20'; Aydoğdu 24'; Žulj 53' (pen.)	Report	Duarte (yellow card) 16'; Kaldırım (yellow card) 45+2'; Türüç 59'	Stadium: Gürsel Aksel Stadium; Attendance: 0 Referee: Ümit Öztürk

19 February 2021 26	İstanbul Başakşehir	0–1	Trabzonspor	Istanbul
19:00 TRT (UTC+3)	Crivelli (yellow card) 64'; Rafael (yellow card) 90' (yellow-red card) 90+4'	Report	Genç (yellow card) 48'; Sari 79', (yellow card) 88'	Stadium: Başakşehir Fatih Terim Stadium; Attendance: 0 Referee: Halil Umut Meler

27 February 2021 27	Antalyaspor	0–0	İstanbul Başakşehir	Antalya
16:00 TRT (UTC+3)	Podolski (yellow card) 86'	Report		Stadium: New Antalya Stadium; Attendance: 0 Referee: Fırat Aydınus

3 March 2021 28	İstanbul Başakşehir	1–1	Konyaspor	Istanbul
16:00 TRT (UTC+3)	Ba 85'	Report	Guilherme (yellow card) 51'; Cikalleshi 79'	Stadium: Başakşehir Fatih Terim Stadium; Attendance: 0 Referee: Ali Palabıyık

7 March 2021 29	Gençlerbirliği	0–1	İstanbul Başakşehir	Ankara
16:00 TRT (UTC+3)	Polomat (yellow card) 57' (yellow-red card) 88'	Report	Aleksić (yellow card) 16'; Kaldırım (yellow card) 58'; Ba 90'	Stadium: Eryaman Stadium; Attendance: 0 Referee: Özgür Yankaya

12 March 2021 30	İstanbul Başakşehir	2–3	Beşiktaş	Istanbul
19:00 TRT (UTC+3)	Aleksić (yellow card) 46'; Türüç 52'; Kaldırım (yellow card) 61'; Ba 76'; Ciğerci (yellow card) 89'	Report	Larin 42'; Ljajić (yellow card) 61'; Welinton 68'; De Souza 84'	Stadium: Başakşehir Fatih Terim Stadium; Attendance: 0 Referee: Cüneyt Çakır

21 March 2021 31	Denizlispor	0–0	İstanbul Başakşehir	Denizli
16:00 TRT (UTC+3)	Murawski (yellow card) 25'	Report	Ciğerci (yellow card) 1'; Ponck (yellow card) 50'	Stadium: Denizli Atatürk Stadium; Attendance: 0 Referee: Tugay Kaan Numanoglu

4 April 2021 32	İstanbul Başakşehir	3–1	Yeni Malatyaspor	Istanbul
16:00 TRT (UTC+3)	Ciğerci 26'; Ponck (yellow card) 29'; Duarte (yellow card) 70'; Ba (penalty missed) 79'; Şahiner 87'; Aleksić 90+1'	Report	Chebake (yellow card) 62'; Büyük 71'	Stadium: Başakşehir Fatih Terim Stadium; Attendance: 0 Referee: Yaşar Kemal Uğurlu

8 April 2021 33	Gaziantep	2–0	İstanbul Başakşehir	Gaziantep
16:00 TRT (UTC+3)	Maxim 32' (pen.), 52'; Şahin (yellow card) 90+1'	Report	Ponck (yellow card) 31'	Stadium: New Gaziantep Stadium; Attendance: 0 Referee: Abdulkadir Bitigen

34	Bye

18 April 2021 35	İstanbul Başakşehir	1–2	Fenerbahçe	Istanbul
19:00 TRT (UTC+3)	Şahiner 18'; Tekdemir (yellow card) 29' (yellow-red card) 60'; Ndayishimiye (yellow card) 38'; Višća (penalty missed) 88'	Report	Yandaş (yellow card) 18'; Szalai 40'; Pelkas 57'; Valencia (yellow card) 60'; Kadıoğlu (yellow card) 90+3'	Stadium: Başakşehir Fatih Terim Stadium; Attendance: 0 Referee: Cüneyt Çakır

22 April 2021 36	Kasımpaşa	0–1	İstanbul Başakşehir	Istanbul
19:00 TRT (UTC+3)	Serbest (yellow card) 31'; Sadiku (yellow card) 77'; Luckassen (yellow card) 90+10'	Report	Chadli 36'; Duarte (yellow card) 90+4'	Stadium: Recep Tayyip Erdoğan Stadium; Attendance: 0 Referee: Yaşar Kemal Uğurlu

25 April 2021 37	İstanbul Başakşehir	0–0	Alanyaspor	Istanbul
16:00 TRT (UTC+3)	Višća (yellow card) 38'	Report		Stadium: Başakşehir Fatih Terim Stadium; Attendance: 0 Referee: Özgür Yankaya

29 April 2021 38	BB Erzurumspor	1–2	İstanbul Başakşehir	Erzurum
16:00 TRT (UTC+3)	Başsan 5', (yellow card) 81'; Alkılıç (yellow card) 37'	Report	Epureanu (red card) 18'; Chadli 58' (pen.); Türüç (yellow card) 81'; Gulbrandsen 84'; Babacan (yellow card) 87'; Crivelli (yellow card) 90+3'	Stadium: Kazım Karabekir Stadium; Attendance: 0 Referee: Fırat Aydınus

3 May 2021 39	İstanbul Başakşehir	2–1	Ankaragücü	Istanbul
16:00 TRT (UTC+3)	Chadli (yellow card) 17'; Aleksić (yellow card) 48', (goal) 63'; Fernandes 88', (yellow card) 90'	Report	Paintsil 15'; Šarlija (yellow card) 17'; Kitsiou (yellow card) 43'; Łukasik (yellow card) 58'; Çekiçi (yellow card) 59'; Kulušić (yellow card) 79'	Stadium: Başakşehir Fatih Terim Stadium; Attendance: 0 Referee: Halil Umut Meler

8 May 2021 40	Sivasspor	0–0	İstanbul Başakşehir	Sivas
20:30 TRT (UTC+3)		Report	Aleksić (yellow card) 45'; Ciğerci (yellow card) 69'	Stadium: Sivas Stadium; Attendance: 0 Referee: Ali Palabıyık

11 May 2021 41	İstanbul Başakşehir	0–0	Kayserispor	Istanbul
20:30 TRT (UTC+3)	Bolingoli (yellow card) 13'	Report	Subaşı (yellow card) 83'	Stadium: Başakşehir Fatih Terim Stadium; Attendance: 0 Referee: Yaşar Kemal Uğurlu

15 May 2021 42	Çaykur Rizespor	0–2	İstanbul Başakşehir	Rize
18:00 TRT (UTC+3)	Samudio (yellow card) 76'	Report	Aleksić 6' (pen.), 45+1'	Stadium: Yeni Rize Şehir Stadium; Attendance: 0 Referee: Koray Gençerler

=== Turkish Cup ===
17 December 2020 Fifth round	İstanbul Başakşehir	7–0	Turgutluspor	Istanbul
19:00 TRT (UTC+3)	Aleksić 5'; Ba 58'; Frei 65'; Chadli 70'; Gulbrandsen 79', 83', 90+3'	Report		Stadium: Başakşehir Fatih Terim Stadium; Attendance: 0 Referee: Turgut Doman

13 January 2021 Round of 16	Tuzlaspor	1–5	İstanbul Başakşehir	Tuzla
18:45 TRT (UTC+3)	Bora 34'; Asatekin (yellow card) 53'	Report	Ba 8'; Konuk 42' (o.g.); Duarte (yellow card) 53'; Aleksic 73'; Tagir 79'; Kahveci 89' (pen.)	Stadium: Tuzla Belediye Stadı; Attendance: 0 Referee: Turgut Doman

9 February 2021 Quarter-finals	Fenerbahçe	1–2 (a.e.t.)	İstanbul Başakşehir	Istanbul
20:45 TRT (UTC+3)	Lemos (red card) 45'; Valencia 72'; Aziz (yellow card) 102'; Tufan (yellow card) 113'; Szalai (yellow card) 120+5'	Report	Sertel (yellow card) 31'; Fernandes 42'; Sarıkaya (yellow card) 93'; Gulbrandsen 96', (yellow card) 112'; Crivelli (yellow card) 120+4'	Stadium: Şükrü Saracoğlu Stadium; Attendance: 0 Referee: Fırat Aydınus

16 March 2021 Semi-finals	Beşiktaş	3–2 (a.e.t.)	İstanbul Başakşehir	Istanbul
20:45 TRT (UTC+3)	Aboubakar 17'; Vida 22', (yellow card) 44'; Larin 102'	Report	Türüç 60'; Giuliano 77'	Stadium: Vodafone Park; Attendance: 0 Referee: Fırat Aydınus

=== Turkish Super Cup ===
27 January 2021 Final	İstanbul Başakşehir	1–2	Trabzonspor	Istanbul
20:45 TRT (UTC+3)	Epureanu (yellow card) 28' (yellow-red card) 73'; Ba 58' (pen.), (yellow card) 90+3'; Türüç (yellow card) 88'; Crivelli (yellow card) 89'	Report	Djaniny 47'; Ié (yellow card) 56'; Ekuban 85'; Marlon (yellow card) 90+12'; Özdemir (yellow card) 90+13'	Stadium: Atatürk Olympic Stadium; Referee: Yaşar Kemal Uğurlu

=== UEFA Champions League ===
==== Group stage ====
The group stage draw was held on 1 October 2020.

Pos	Team	Pld	W	D	L	GF	GA	GD	Pts	Qualification	PAR	RBL	MUN	IBS
1	(France) Paris Saint-Germain	6	4	0	2	13	6	+7	12 (Note: Tied on head-to-head points (3). Head-to-head away goals: Paris Saint-Germain 1, RB Leipzig 0.)	Advance to knockout phase	—	1–0	1–2	5–1
2	(Germany) RB Leipzig	6	4	0	2	11	12	−1	12	Advance to knockout phase	2–1	—	3–2	2–0
3	(England) Manchester United	6	3	0	3	15	10	+5	9	Transfer to Europa League	1–3	5–0	—	4–1
4	(Turkey) İstanbul Başakşehir	6	1	0	5	7	18	−11	3		0–2	3–4	2–1	—

Source: UEFA
Rules for classification: Group stage tiebreakers
Notes:

20 October 2020 1	RB Leipzig (Germany)	2–0	(Turkey) İstanbul Başakşehir	Leipzig, Germany
21:00 CEST (UTC+2)	Angeliño 16', 20'; Nkunku (yellow card) 40'; Upamecano (yellow card) 41'; Konaté (yellow card) 73'; Henrichs (yellow card) 89'	Report	Bolingoli (yellow card) 18'; Rafael (yellow card) 43'; Özcan (yellow card) 86'	Stadium: Red Bull Arena; Attendance: 999; Referee: Jesús Gil Manzano (Spain)

28 October 2020 2	İstanbul Başakşehir (Turkey)	0–2	(France) Paris Saint-Germain	Istanbul, Turkey
18:55 CET (UTC+1)	Crivelli (yellow card) 3'; Epureanu (yellow card) 49'; Topal (yellow card) 54'	Report	Kean 64', 79'; Kehrer (yellow card) 83'	Stadium: Fatih Terim Stadium; Attendance: 350; Referee: Andreas Ekberg (Sweden)

4 November 2020 3	İstanbul Başakşehir (Turkey)	2–1	(England) Manchester United	Istanbul, Turkey
18:55 CET (UTC+1)	Ba 13'; Višća 40'; Škrtel (yellow card) 89'	Report	Tuanzebe (yellow card) 20'; Martial 43'	Stadium: Başakşehir Fatih Terim Stadium; Attendance: 350; Referee: Davide Massa (Italy)

24 November 2020 4	Manchester United (England)	4–1	(Turkey) İstanbul Başakşehir	Manchester, England
21:00 CET (UTC+1)	Fernandes 7', 19'; Rashford 35' (pen.); Tuanzebe (yellow card) 55'; Maguire (yellow card) 86'; James 90+2'	Report	Türüç 75', (yellow card) 89'; Škrtel (yellow card) 78'; Tekdemir (yellow card) 85'	Stadium: Old Trafford; Attendance: 545; Referee: Ovidiu Hațegan (Romania)

2 December 2020 5	İstanbul Başakşehir (Turkey)	3–4	(Germany) RB Leipzig	Istanbul, Turkey
18:55 CET (UTC+1)	Škrtel (yellow card) 38'; Kahveci 45+3', 72', 85'; Türüç (yellow card) 58'; Tekdemir (yellow card) 79'; Rafael (yellow card) 89'	Report	Poulsen 26'; Mukiele 43'; Upamecano (yellow card) 53'; Olmo 66', (yellow card) 67'; Sørloth 90+2'	Stadium: Fatih Terim Stadium; Attendance: 0 (Note: Due to the COVID-19 pandemic in Europe, the match was played behind closed doors.); Referee: Carlos del Cerro Grande (Spain)

9 December 2020 6	Paris Saint-Germain (France)	5–1	(Turkey) İstanbul Başakşehir	Paris, France
18:55 CET (UTC+1)	Neymar 21', 38', 50'; Mbappé 42' (pen.), 62'; Pembélé (yellow card) 90+2'	Report	Tekdemir (yellow card) 10'; Rafael (yellow card) 12'; Günok (yellow card) 42'; Topal 57'; Crivelli (yellow card) 63'	Stadium: Parc de Princes; Attendance: 0 Referee: Ovidiu Hațegan (Romania) and Danny Makkelie (Netherlands)
Note: The Paris Saint-Germain v İstanbul Başakşehir match was suspended after 14 minutes, with the score 0–0 at the time, as both teams left the pitch in protest after an alleged racist incident by a match official directed at the assistant manager of İstanbul Başakşehir. The match was resumed on 9 December 2020, 18:55 CET, with a new team of match officials.

== Statistics ==
=== Goalscorers ===
As of 14 February 2021

Rank	No.	Pos	Nat	Name	Süper Lig	Turkish Cup	Turkish Super Cup	Champions League	Total
1	22	FW	(Norway)	Fredrik Gulbrandsen	6	4	0	0	10
2	7	MF	(Bosnia and Herzegovina)	Edin Višća	5	0	0	1	6
2	17	MF	(Turkey)	İrfan Kahveci	2	1	0	3	6
2	19	FW	(Senegal)	Demba Ba	2	2	1	1	6
5	8	MF	(Serbia)	Danijel Aleksić	2	2	0	0	4
6	5	MF	(Turkey)	Mehmet Topal	2	0	0	1	3
7	11	MF	(Belgium)	Nacer Chadli	1	1	0	0	2
7	20	MF	(Brazil)	Giuliano	2	0	0	0	2
7	23	MF	(Turkey)	Deniz Türüç	1	0	0	1	2
7	27	FW	(France)	Enzo Crivelli	2	0	0	0	2
11	9	FW	(Chile)	Junior Fernandes	0	1	0	0	1
11	21	MF	(Turkey)	Mahmut Tekdemir	1	0	0	0	1
11	24	DF	(Turkey)	Ravil Tagir	0	1	0	0	1
11	29	MF	(Turkey)	Kerim Frei	0	1	0	0	1
Own goals					2	1	0	0	3
Totals					28	14	1	7	50
