= Danijel Aleksić =

Serbian footballer (born 1991)

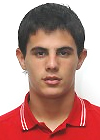

Personal information
- Date of birth: 30 April 1991 (age 35)
- Place of birth: Pula, SR Croatia, SFR Yugoslavia
- Height: 1.82 m (6 ft 0 in)
- Position: Forward

Youth career
- 1998–2002: Veternik
- 2002–2007: Vojvodina

Senior career*
Years	Team	Apps	(Gls)
2007–2010	Vojvodina	48	(8)
2010–2011	Genoa	1	(0)
2010–2011	→ Greuther Fürth (loan)	16	(2)
2012–2014	Saint-Étienne	3	(0)
2012–2014	→ Saint-Étienne B (loan)	32	(12)
2013–2014	→ Arles-Avignon (loan)	1	(0)
2013–2014	→ Arles-Avignon B (loan)	2	(1)
2014	Lechia Gdańsk	3	(0)
2014	Lechia Gdańsk II	6	(3)
2015–2018	St. Gallen	89	(23)
2018–2019	Yeni Malatyaspor	32	(10)
2019	Al-Ahli	1	(1)
2019–2024	İstanbul Başakşehir	138	(27)
2024–2025	Konyaspor	32	(5)
2025–2026	Çorum	26	(2)

International career
2006–2008	Serbia U17	12	(9)
2008–2010	Serbia U19	13	(7)
2008–2011	Serbia U21	8	(1)
2008–2018	Serbia	2	(0)
- * Club domestic league appearances and goals

Danijel Aleksić (Serbian Cyrillic: Дaниjeл Aлeкcић; born 30 April 1991) is a former professional footballer who played as a forward. Born in Croatia, he played for the Serbia national team.

== Early life ==
Born in Pula, SR Croatia, Yugoslavia, Aleksić's mother fled to Serbia due to the Croatian War of Independence. He never met his biological father and carries his mother's last name.

== Club career ==
=== Early career in Vojvodina ===
Aleksić started playing football at the age of seven in a local club Veternik. By the age of 11, he transferred to Vojvodina, where he made it through every age group. Simultaneous to football, Aleksić attended Jovan Vukanović streamlined technical high school. On 5 May 2007, he made his senior debut for Vojvodina under head coach Milovan Rajevac in an away league match against Red Star Belgrade. Being only sixteen years and five days old, Aleksić became the second youngest player ever to appear in a Serbian SuperLiga match (behind Slavko Perović). By the end of the 2006–07 season, he recorded one more league appearance. On 2 April 2008, Aleksić scored his first league goal on 2 April 2008 in a 4–1 home victory against Hajduk Kula.

During Vojvodina's 2008–09 season opening league match, a derby versus Red Star Belgrade, Aleksić scored a 90th-minute goal to put the game beyond reach and ensure a famous 2–0 win for his team. In November 2008, Aleksić started to figure as a transfer target for Serbia's biggest clubs – Red Star and Partizan – however, Vojvodina officials at the time were adamant that they would never sell him to league competitors. In late March 2009, he also reportedly started getting attention from abroad, with scouts from Real Madrid and Villarreal coming to watch him play for the Serbian U19 national squad. For his part, in mid-May 2009, Aleksić said that he would prefer his first transfer abroad to be to Holland's Eredivisie or Germany's Bundesliga.

=== Genoa ===
Aleksić signed for Genoa on 19 January 2010, becoming the club's second Serbian signing of the season after Nenad Tomović. Playing under head coach Gian Piero Gasperini, Aleksić made his Serie A debut against Juventus on 14 February 2010, coming on as a substitute for Domenico Criscito at the 88th minute, in which Genoa lost 3–2. The brief minutes-long runout remained his only league appearance until the end of the 2009–10 Serie A season.

The arrival of striker Luca Toni to Genoa in summer 2010 meant that Aleksić became surplus to club's current requirements, so on 1 July, the latter was set to move to Serie B club Crotone on loan. However, he refused the transfers and eventually remained at Genoa. However, at the end of 2010 summer transfer window, he moved to 2. Bundesliga club SpVgg Greuther Fürth loan until the end of the season 2010–11.

On 28 June 2011, Austria Wien confirmed Aleksić was on trial.

=== Later career ===
Aleksić signed for Kavala on 21 August 2011, but after a few months, it was expelled from the Super League Greece and relegated to the Delta Ethniki. As a result, the loan move was canceled and he returned to Genoa.

Aleksić joined Lechia Gdańsk in summer 2014 on a two-year contract, making his debut in a 3–1 defeat against Wisła Kraków. After a poor start with the club, he was demoted to reserve team and received criticism for his performances with the first team. After six months in the club, Aleksić signed for St. Gallen in February 2015. He made four first team appearances at Lechia, failing to score, but had more success with the Lechia II team scoring three goals in six appearances.

== International career ==
At the age of 17 on 16 November 2008, Aleksić debuted for the Serbian senior team under head coach Radomir Antić in a friendly match against Poland in Belek, Turkey, becoming one of Serbia's youngest debutants. Ten years later, he returned to the national team as a late substitute in a UEFA Nations League match against Lithuania.

== Career statistics ==
=== Club ===
As of match played 7 June 2024

Appearances and goals by club, season and competition
Club	Season	League			National cup (Note: Includes Serbian Cup, DFB-Pokal, Polish Cup, Swiss Cup, Turkish Cup)		Continental		Other		Total	
Club	Season	Division	Apps	Goals	Apps	Goals	Apps	Goals	Apps	Goals	Apps	Goals
Vojvodina	2006–07	Serbian Superliga	2	0	0	0	—		—		2	0
Vojvodina	2007–08	Serbian Superliga	12	2	0	0	1 (Note: Appearance(s) in UEFA Cup)	0	—		13	2
Vojvodina	2008–09	Serbian Superliga	22	4	1	1	4	0	—		27	5
Vojvodina	2009–10	Serbian Superliga	12	2	3	2	0	0	—		15	4
Vojvodina	Total		48	8	4	3	5	0	—		57	11
Genoa	2009–10	Serie A	1	0	0	0	0	0	—		1	0
Greuther Fürth (loan)	2010–11	2. Bundesliga	16	2	1	0	—		—		17	2
Saint-Étienne	2011–12	Ligue 1	1	0	0	0	—		—		1	0
Saint-Étienne	2012–13	Ligue 1	2	0	0	0	—		—		2	0
Saint-Étienne	Total		3	0	0	0	—		—		3	0
Arles-Avignon (loan)	2013–14	Ligue 2	1	0	0	0	—		—		1	0
Lechia Gdańsk	2014–15	Ekstraklasa	3	0	1	0	—		—		4	0
St. Gallen	2014–15	Swiss Super League	4	1	0	0	—		—		4	1
St. Gallen	2015–16	Swiss Super League	33	12	2	0	—		—		35	12
St. Gallen	2016–17	Swiss Super League	24	3	2	0	—		—		26	3
St. Gallen	2017–18	Swiss Super League	28	7	3	1	—		—		31	8
St. Gallen	Total		89	23	7	1	—		—		96	24
Yeni Malatyaspor	2018–19	Süper Lig	32	10	6	4	—		—		38	14
Al-Ahli	2019–20	Saudi Pro League	1	1	0	0	2 (Note: Appearances in AFC Champions League)	1	—		3	2
İstanbul Başakşehir	2019–20	Süper Lig	24	6	4	1	7 (Note: Appearances in UEFA Europa League)	1	—		35	8
İstanbul Başakşehir	2020–21	Süper Lig	31	6	3	2	3 (Note: Appearances in UEFA Champions League)	0	1 (Note: Appearances in Turkish Super Cup)	0	38	8
İstanbul Başakşehir	2021–22	Süper Lig	32	6	1	0	—		—		33	6
İstanbul Başakşehir	2022–23	Süper Lig	30	8	6	1	14 (Note: Appearances in UEFA Europa Conference League)	5	—		50	14
İstanbul Başakşehir	2023–24	Süper Lig	21	1	3	0	—		—		24	1
İstanbul Başakşehir	Total		138	27	17	4	24	6	1	0	180	37
Career total			333	71	36	12	31	7	1	0	400	90

=== International ===
Appearances and goals by national team and year
National team	Year	Apps	Goals
Serbia	2008	1	0
Serbia	2018	1	0
Total		2	0

== Honours ==
Saint-Étienne

- Coupe de la Ligue: 2012–13

İstanbul Başakşehir

- Süper Lig: 2019–20

Individual

- UEFA European Under-17 Championship Golden Player Award: 2008
