= Patryk Szysz =

Polish footballer

Personal information
- Full name: Patryk Konrad Szysz
- Date of birth: 1 April 1998 (age 28)
- Place of birth: Lublin, Poland
- Height: 1.77 m (5 ft 10 in)
- Position: Forward

Team information
- Current team: Odra Opole
- Number: 20

Youth career
- –2016: Górnik Łęczna

Senior career*
Years	Team	Apps	(Gls)
2016–2019	Górnik Łęczna	54	(21)
2016–2017	→ Motor Lublin (loan)	24	(4)
2019–2022	Zagłębie Lubin	100	(23)
2019–2020	Zagłębie Lubin II	5	(2)
2022–2025	İstanbul Başakşehir	28	(3)
2025–2026	Arka Gdynia	23	(0)
2026–	Odra Opole	8	(1)

International career
2019–2020	Poland U21	4	(0)
- * Club domestic league appearances and goals as of 10:27, 15 September 2026 (UTC)

Patryk Konrad Szysz (born 1 April 1998) is a Polish professional footballer who plays as a forward for I liga club Odra Opole.

== Career ==
=== Górnik Łęczna ===
Szysz started his adventure with football in Górnik Łęczna's youth teams. He made his debut in senior football on 21 June 2014 for the club's reserve team. As a 16-year-old, he played 10 minutes in a league match between Stal Poniatowa and Górnik Łęczna II. His breakthrough season turned out to be the 2015–16 campaign, when Szysz began to play an increasingly important role in the team. A year later, he was loaned to fourth-tier club Motor Lublin. There, the 18-year-old striker appeared in 24 games and scored four goals, including a double in the clash with Cosmos Nowotaniec on 10 March 2017. After returning from loan, he was promoted to the first team squad of Górnik Łęczna and quickly became an important player.

=== Zagłębie Lubin ===
On 10 January 2019, Ekstraklasa club Zagłębie Lubin confirmed that Szysz had joined the club.

=== İstanbul Başakşehir ===
On 23 May 2022, Szysz moved to Süper Lig side İstanbul Başakşehir on a three-year deal.

On 21 July 2022, he scored his first goal for İstanbul against Maccabi Netanya in the first leg of the 2022-23 UEFA Europa Conference League campaign in the second qualifying round. His Süper Lig debut came on 8 August 2022 as a starter against Kasımpaşa, with Szysz scoring his first goal to make it 2–0 for Başakşehir, the match ended 4–0 for the home side.

On 4 May 2023, he suffered injuries to his ACL, meniscus and patellar tendon in a Turkish Cup match against Ankaragücü. After missing the entire 2023–24 season, he returned to play on 30 November 2024, entering the pitch in the second half of a 4–1 win over Göztepe. On 30 May 2025, it was announced Szysz's contract would not be extended beyond June 2025.

=== Arka Gdynia ===
On 2 September 2025, Szysz signed a season-long deal with Ekstraklasa club Arka Gdynia, with an option for a further year.

=== Odra Opole ===
On 18 July 2026, Szysz moved to Odra Opole on a two-year contract.

== Career statistics ==
As of match played 23 May 2026

Appearances and goals by club, season and competition
Club	Season	League			National cup (Note: Includes Polish Cup, Turkish Cup)		Continental		Other		Total	
Club	Season	Division	Apps	Goals	Apps	Goals	Apps	Goals	Apps	Goals	Apps	Goals
Motor Lublin (loan)	2016–17	III liga, gr. IV	24	4	—		—		—		24	4
Górnik Łęczna	2017–18	I liga	33	10	1	0	—		—		34	10
Górnik Łęczna	2018–19	II liga	21	11	0	0	—		—		21	11
Górnik Łęczna	Total		54	21	1	0	—		—		55	21
Zagłębie Lubin	2018–19	Ekstraklasa	5	1	—		—		—		5	1
Zagłębie Lubin	2019–20	Ekstraklasa	32	3	2	1	—		—		34	4
Zagłębie Lubin	2020–21	Ekstraklasa	30	8	3	0	—		—		33	8
Zagłębie Lubin	2021–22	Ekstraklasa	33	11	3	1	—		—		36	12
Zagłębie Lubin	Total		100	23	8	2	—		—		108	25
Zagłębie Lubin II	2018–19	III liga, gr. III	4	2	—		—		—		4	2
Zagłębie Lubin II	2019–20	III liga, gr. III	1	0	0	0	—		—		1	0
Zagłębie Lubin II	Total		5	2	0	0	—		—		5	2
İstanbul Başakşehir	2022–23	Süper Lig	25	3	4	2	12 (Note: Appearances in UEFA Europa Conference League)	1	—		41	6
İstanbul Başakşehir	2023–24	Süper Lig	0	0	0	0	—		—		0	0
İstanbul Başakşehir	2024–25	Süper Lig	3	0	0	0	0	0	—		3	0
İstanbul Başakşehir	Total		28	3	4	2	12	1	—		44	6
Arka Gdynia	2025–26	Ekstraklasa	23	0	2	0	—		—		25	0
Odra Opole	2026–27	I liga	0	0	0	0	—		—		0	0
Career total			234	53	15	4	12	1	0	0	261	58

== Honours ==
Motor Lublin

- Polish Cup (Lublin subdistrict regionals): 2016–17
