= Youssouf Ndayishimiye =

Burundian footballer

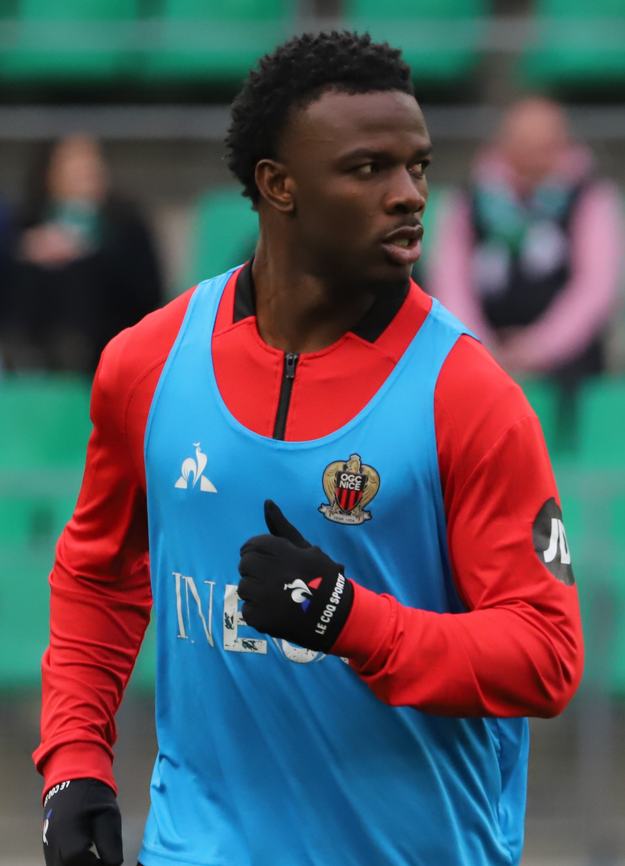
- Ndayishimiye with Nice in 2025

Personal information
- Full name: Youssouf Nyange Ndayishimiye
- Date of birth: 27 October 1998 (age 28)
- Place of birth: Bujumbura, Burundi
- Height: 1.87 m (6 ft 2 in)
- Positions: Defensive midfielder; centre-back

Team information
- Current team: Nice
- Number: 55

Senior career*
| Years | Team | Apps | (Gls) |
| 2016–2020 | Aigle Noir | | |
| 2020–2021 | Yeni Malatyaspor | 27 | (3) |
| 2021–2023 | İstanbul Başakşehir | 58 | (5) |
| 2023– | Nice | 65 | (4) |

International career^{‡}
| 2017– | Burundi | 30 | (1) |
- * Club domestic league appearances and goals as of 22:45, 18 October 2026 (UTC) ‡ National team caps and goals as of 29 September 2026

Youssouf Nyange Ndayishimiye (born 27 October 1998) is a Burundian professional footballer who plays as a defensive midfielder or centre-back for the Ligue 1 club Nice and the Burundi national team.

== Club career ==
In January 2023 Ndayishimiye joined Ligue 1 club Nice from Süper Lig side İstanbul Başakşehir. He signed a contract until 2027 while, according to Turkish media, Nice agreed a transfer fee of €11 million plus bonuses with İstanbul Başakşehir.

== International career ==
Ndayishimiye represented the Burundi national team in a 7–0 friendly win over Djibouti on 11 March 2017.

== Career statistics ==
=== Club ===
As of match played 18 October 2026

Appearances and goals by club, season and competition
| Club | Season | League | | | National Cup | | Continental | | Other | | Total | |
| Club | Season | Division | Apps | Goals | Apps | Goals | Apps | Goals | Apps | Goals | Apps | Goals |
|---|---|---|---|---|---|---|---|---|---|---|---|---|
| Yeni Malatyaspor | 2019–20 | Süper Lig | 8 | 1 | — | | — | | — | | 8 | 1 |
| Yeni Malatyaspor | 2020–21 | Süper Lig | 19 | 2 | 1 | 0 | — | | — | | 20 | 2 |
| Yeni Malatyaspor | Total | | 27 | 3 | 1 | 0 | 0 | 0 | 0 | 0 | 28 | 3 |
| İstanbul Başakşehir | 2020–21 | Süper Lig | 14 | 0 | 2 | 0 | 0 | 0 | — | | 16 | 0 |
| İstanbul Başakşehir | 2021–22 | Süper Lig | 27 | 1 | 1 | 0 | 0 | 0 | — | | 28 | 1 |
| İstanbul Başakşehir | 2022–23 | Süper Lig | 17 | 4 | 1 | 0 | 12 (Note: Appearances in the UEFA Europa Conference League) | 3 | — | | 30 | 7 |
| İstanbul Başakşehir | Total | | 58 | 5 | 4 | 0 | 12 | 3 | — | | 74 | 8 |
| Nice | 2022–23 | Ligue 1 | 10 | 1 | 0 | 0 | 4 | 0 | — | | 14 | 1 |
| Nice | 2023–24 | Ligue 1 | 23 | 0 | 3 | 1 | — | | — | | 26 | 1 |
| Nice | 2024–25 | Ligue 1 | 23 | 3 | 1 | 0 | 5 (Note: Appearances in UEFA Europa League) | 0 | — | | 29 | 3 |
| Nice | 2025–26 | Ligue 1 | 2 | 0 | — | | — | | — | | 2 | 0 |
| Nice | 2026–27 | Ligue 1 | 7 | 0 | 0 | 0 | — | | — | | 7 | 0 |
| Nice | Total | | 65 | 4 | 4 | 1 | 9 | 0 | — | | 78 | 5 |
| Career total | | | 150 | 12 | 8 | 1 | 21 | 3 | 0 | 0 | 180 | 16 |

=== International ===
As of match played 29 September 2026

Appearances and goals by national team and year
| National team | Year | Apps | Goals |
|---|---|---|---|
| Burundi | 2017 | 6 | 0 |
| Burundi | 2019 | 3 | 0 |
| Burundi | 2020 | 3 | 1 |
| Burundi | 2021 | 3 | 0 |
| Burundi | 2022 | 3 | 0 |
| Burundi | 2023 | 3 | 0 |
| Burundi | 2024 | 4 | 0 |
| Burundi | 2025 | 1 | 0 |
| Burundi | 2026 | 4 | 0 |
| Total | | 30 | 1 |

Scores and results list Burundi's goal tally first, score column indicates score after each Ndayishimiye goal.

List of international goals scored by Youssouf Ndayishimiye
| No. | Date | Venue | Opponent | Score | Result | Competition | Ref. |
|---|---|---|---|---|---|---|---|
| 1 | 15 November 2020 | Intwari Stadium, Bujumbura, Burundi | Mauritania | 2-1 | 3-1 | 2021 Africa Cup of Nations qualification | |

== Honours ==
Nice

- Coupe de France runner-up: 2025–26
