= Stefano Okaka =

Italian footballer (born 1989)

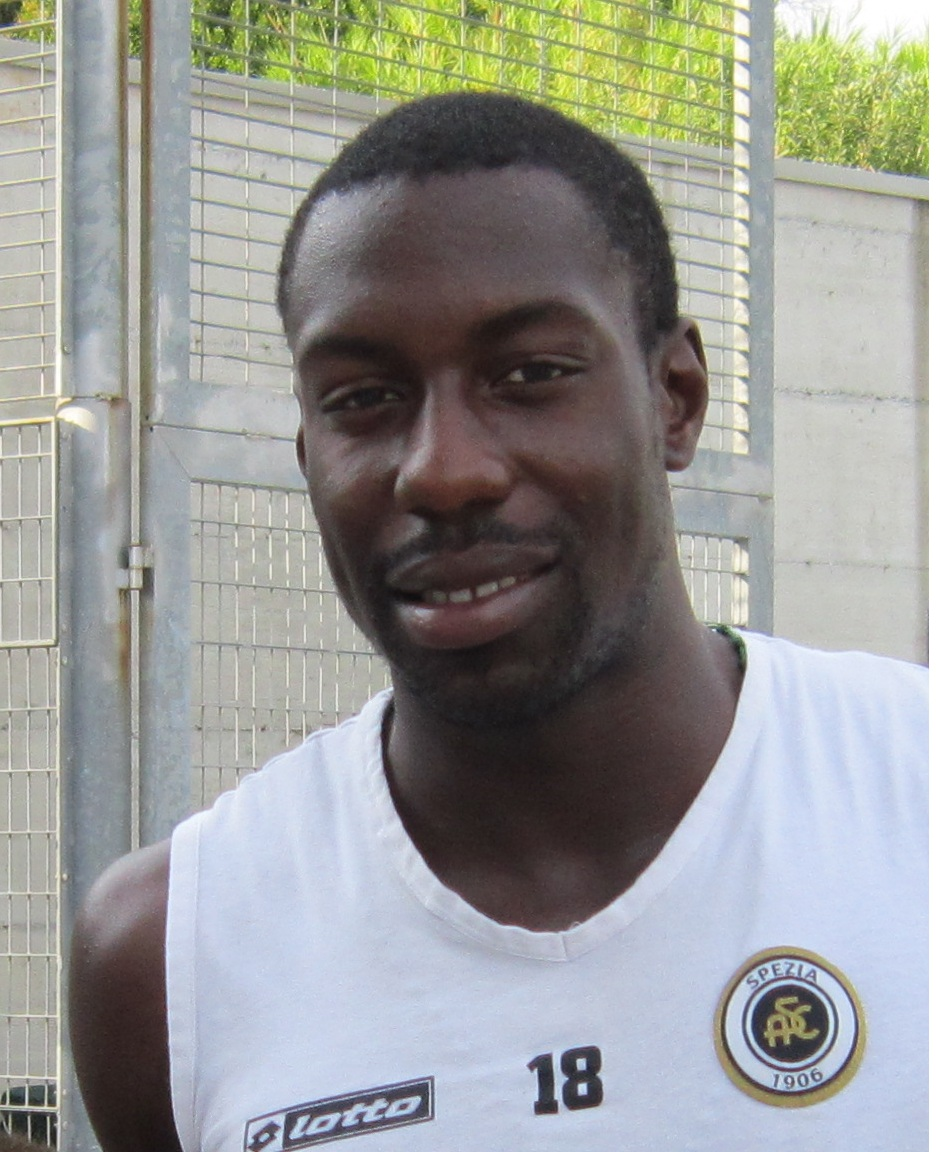
- Okaka at Spezia in 2012

Personal information
- Full name: Stefano Chuka Okaka
- Date of birth: 9 August 1989 (age 37)
- Place of birth: Castiglione del Lago, Italy
- Height: 1.86 m (6 ft 1 in)
- Position: Striker

Youth career
- Castiglionese
- Sanfatucchio
- 2001: Centro Italia Parma
- 2002–2004: Cittadella
- 2004–2005: Roma

Senior career*
Years	Team	Apps	(Gls)
2005–2012	Roma	34	(2)
2007–2008	→ Modena (loan)	33	(7)
2009–2010	→ Brescia (loan)	17	(2)
2010	→ Fulham (loan)	11	(2)
2011	→ Bari (loan)	10	(2)
2012	→ Parma (loan)	14	(3)
2012–2014	Parma	2	(0)
2012–2013	→ Spezia (loan)	38	(7)
2014–2015	Sampdoria	36	(8)
2015–2016	Anderlecht	37	(15)
2016–2019	Watford	36	(5)
2019	→ Udinese (loan)	16	(6)
2019–2021	Udinese	57	(12)
2021–2023	İstanbul Başakşehir	52	(13)
2025–2026	Ravenna	21	(3)

International career^{‡}
2007–2008	Italy U19	3	(0)
2008	Italy U20	2	(2)
2009–2010	Italy U21	7	(2)
2014–2020	Italy	5	(1)
- * Club domestic league appearances and goals as of 30 April 2026 ‡ National team caps and goals as of 22:02, 15 November 2020 (UTC)

Stefano Chuka Okaka (Italian pronunciation: [ˈsteːfano oˈkaːka]; born 9 August 1989) is an Italian footballer who plays as a forward.

He began his career at Roma, debuting shortly after his 16th birthday and being loaned to several other teams for the duration of his contract. He totalled over 125 Serie A games for that club, Bari, Parma, Sampdoria and Udinese. Abroad, he played 47 Premier League matches for Fulham and Watford, and had a season in Belgium with Anderlecht.

== Club career ==
=== Roma ===
Born in Castiglione del Lago, Umbria, Italy to Nigerian parents who later obtained Italian citizenship, Okaka joined the Roma youth system in 2004. He was part of the team that won the U-20 national title in 2005 and scored goals against Juventus in the semi-final and Atalanta in the final.

On 29 September 2005, at the age of 16 years, 51 days he made his debut with the first team in the UEFA Cup, playing against Aris. He thus became the youngest footballer to debut in an international competition for an Italian team. Okaka scored his first goal for Roma in a Coppa Italia match against Napoli on 8 December, with a powerful run from midfield and a precise shot to the left of the goalkeeper, making him the youngest goalscorer in the competition at the age of 16 years, 121 days. He made his Serie A debut with the club later that month, on 18 December, at the age of 16 years and 125 days, in a 1–1 away draw against Sampdoria.

Okaka scored his first Serie A goal on 17 September 2006, concluding a 3–1 win over Siena, just 38 days after his 17th birthday, after coming on as a substitute for Francesco Totti. He made his debut in the UEFA Champions League ten days later, in a 2–1 away loss to Valencia, aged 17 years, 49 days.

Okaka was subsequently loaned to Serie B side Modena for the 2007–08 season in order to gain some first team experience. He scored seven times in 33 appearances. After returning to Roma, he signed a new contract which lasted until 30 June 2012. As a part of it, he earned a gross annual salary of €600,000 in the first two seasons, which then increased to €700,000 and €900,000. He also spent a six-month loan period at Brescia in Serie B from January to June 2009, where he scored two goals in 16 appearances.

On 6 August 2009, substitute Okaka scored his first goal with Roma in a continental competition, the final goal in a 7–1 win away to Gent in the second leg of the 2009–10 UEFA Europa League third qualifying round (10–2 aggregate). He scored again in the Europa League in Roma's 2–0 win over CSKA Sofia and in Roma's 2–1 win over Fulham. His last goal with Roma was an 88th-minute winner against Siena.

On 1 February 2010, he joined Fulham on loan until the end of the season. He made his debut in the 1–0 win over Portsmouth on 3 February, and scored his first goal for the club eleven days later in a 5th round FA Cup tie at home to Notts County. He scored his first league goal for the club against Wigan Athletic on 4 April, in a 2–1 win at Craven Cottage. He was cup-tied for Fulham's run to the 2010 UEFA Europa League Final.

In January 2011 Okaka moved to Bari on loan. There, he scored his first goal against Lecce for 1–0 win. In this game he and Kamil Glik marking their debuts for Bari. He scored one further goal for Bari that season. Okaka sustained an injury in round 30 and missed the rest of the season.

In August 2011, Okaka was attacked by Roma fans after a training session for allegedly not wishing to sign autographs.

=== Parma ===
After failing to make a single appearance for Roma in the first half of the season, on 22 January 2012, Okaka joined Parma on loan until the end of the season. He scored his first goal on 7 March, the opener in a 2–2 against Fiorentina.

Okaka signed a permanent deal with Parma on 20 August 2012. The following day he was loaned to the newly promoted Serie B club Spezia where he made 38 appearances, scoring seven goals and assisting six more. After his loan spell, he returned to Parma for the 2013–14 season, making only two Serie A matches as a substitute.

=== Sampdoria ===
On 31 January 2014, Okaka was transferred to the fellow Serie A outfit Sampdoria on a permanent deal, with Nicola Pozzi moving the opposite direction. He made a good start to his Sampdoria career, scoring five times in 13 appearances in the 2013–14 season.

He scored his first goal of the 2014–15 season on 14 September 2014, a solo effort, in the 2–0 victory against Torino on 14 September 2014. On 10 June 2015, the owner and president of Sampdoria Massimo Ferrero told the Italian media that Okaka would be leaving the club.

=== Anderlecht ===
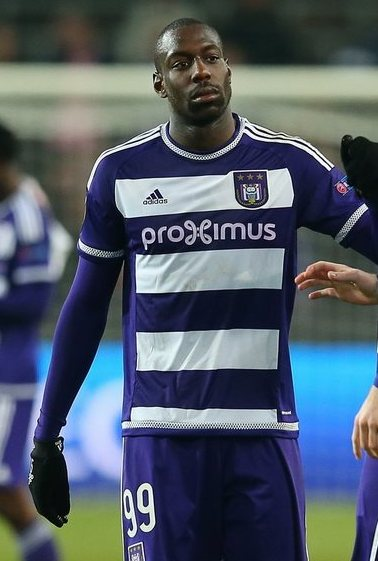
Okaka with Anderlecht in 2015

On 28 July 2015, Okaka joined Belgian side Anderlecht from Sampdoria for a reported fee of €3 million.

=== Watford and Udinese ===
On 29 August 2016, Okaka joined Watford from Anderlecht on a five-year contract. He scored his first two goals on 10 December, against Everton in a 3–2 win. In his second season, after the departure of compatriot manager Walter Mazzarri, he was more used as a substitute; his one-goal came on opening day, opening a 3–3 draw with Liverpool at Vicarage Road.

On 8 January 2019, Okaka was loaned to Udinese for the rest of the Serie A season, having played just 47 minutes for Watford all season across three substitute appearances. Both clubs were owned by Giampaolo Pozzo. He scored six goals in 16 games as the Bianconeri avoided relegation, including braces in consecutive wins over Frosinone and SPAL in May.

Okaka's move to Udinese was made permanent on 2 September 2019, on a three-year contract.

== International career ==
After gaining Italian citizenship in 2007, Okaka was selected for the Italian Under-19 side. He made his debut for the Italy U-20 team in 2008, scoring two goals. On 17 November 2009, he made his debut with the Italy U-21 squad in a match against Luxembourg.

In April 2014, Okaka revealed he was in talks with the Nigeria Football Federation about the possibility of him switching allegiance to his parents' country and play with the Nigeria national football team already at the 2014 FIFA World Cup.

However, Okaka was included in the Italy squad for their friendly against Albania on 18 November 2014 by manager Antonio Conte. He made his debut as a substitute, replacing Sebastian Giovinco in the second half, and scored the only goal of the match in the victory at Sampdoria's home ground, the Stadio Luigi Ferraris.

== Personal life ==
Okaka's twin sister, Stefania Okaka, is also a professional sportsperson. A volleyball player, she plays for Béziers Volley of the French first division and the Italy national team.

== Career statistics ==
=== Club ===
As of match played 8 May 2023

Appearances and goals by club, season and competition
Club	Season	League			National cup (Note: Includes Coppa Italia, FA Cup, Belgian Cup, Turkish Cup)		League cup (Note: Includes EFL Cup)		Europe		Other		Total	
Club	Season	Division	Apps	Goals	Apps	Goals	Apps	Goals	Apps	Goals	Apps	Goals	Apps	Goals
Roma	2005–06	Serie A	8	0	6	1	—		3 (Note: Appearances in UEFA Cup)	0	—		17	1
Roma	2006–07	Serie A	6	1	2	0	—		3 (Note: Appearance(s) in UEFA Champions League)	0	—		11	1
Roma	2008–09	Serie A	9	0	1	0	—		1	0	1 (Note: Appearance in Supercoppa Italiana)	0	12	0
Roma	2009–10	Serie A	7	1	1	0	—		6 (Note: Appearances in UEFA Europa League)	3	—		14	4
Roma	2010–11	Serie A	4	0	0	0	—		—		1	0	5	0
Roma	2011–12	Serie A	0	0	0	0	—		2	0	—		2	0
Roma	Total		34	2	10	1	0	0	15	3	2	0	61	6
Modena (loan)	2007–08	Serie B	33	7	1	0	—		—		—		34	7
Brescia (loan)	2008–09	Serie B	16	2	0	0	—		—		2 (Note: Appearances in Serie A promotion play-offs)	0	18	2
Fulham (loan)	2009–10	Premier League	11	2	2	1	0	0	0	0	—		13	3
Bari (loan)	2010–11	Serie A	10	2	0	0	—		—		—		10	2
Parma	2011–12	Serie A	14	3	0	0	—		—		—		14	3
Parma	2012–13	Serie A	0	0	0	0	—		—		—		0	0
Parma	2013–14	Serie A	2	0	0	0	—		—		—		2	0
Parma	Total		16	3	0	0	0	0	0	0	0	0	16	3
Spezia (loan)	2012–13	Serie B	38	7	0	0	—		—		—		38	7
Sampdoria	2013–14	Serie A	13	5	0	0	—		—		—		13	5
Sampdoria	2014–15	Serie A	32	4	2	0	—		—		—		34	4
Sampdoria	Total		45	9	2	0	0	0	0	0	0	0	47	9
Anderlecht	2015–16	Belgian Pro League	37	15	2	0	—		10	2	—		49	17
Watford	2016–17	Premier League	19	4	1	0	0	0	—		—		20	4
Watford	2017–18	Premier League	15	1	1	0	0	0	—		—		16	1
Watford	2018–19	Premier League	2	0	0	0	1	0	—		—		3	0
Watford	Total		36	5	2	0	1	0	0	0	0	0	39	5
Udinese (loan)	2018–19	Serie A	16	6	0	0	—		—		—		16	6
Udinese	2019–20	Serie A	33	8	0	0	—		—		—		33	8
Udinese	2020–21	Serie A	22	4	1	0	—		—		—		23	4
Udinese	2021–22	Serie A	2	0	1	0	—		—		—		3	0
Udinese	Total		73	18	2	0	0	0	0	0	0	0	75	18
İstanbul Başakşehir	2021–22	Süper Lig	31	12	1	0	—		—		—		32	12
İstanbul Başakşehir	2022–23	Süper Lig	21	1	2	1	—		14 (Note: Appearances in UEFA Europa Conference League)	6	—		37	8
İstanbul Başakşehir	Total		52	13	3	1	0	0	14	6	0	0	69	20
Career total			401	85	21	3	1	0	39	11	4	0	467	99

=== International ===
Appearances and goals by national team and year
National team	Year	Apps	Goals
Italy	2014	1	1
Italy	2015	2	0
Italy	2016	1	0
Italy	2020	1	0
Total		5	1

Scores and results list Templatonia's goal tally first, score column indicates score after each Okaka goal.

List of international goals scored by Stefano Okaka
No.	Date	Venue	Opponent	Score	Result	Competition
1	18 November 2014	Stadio Luigi Ferraris, Genoa, Italy	Albania	1–0	1–0	Friendly
