= Muhammed Şengezer =

Turkish footballer (born 1997)

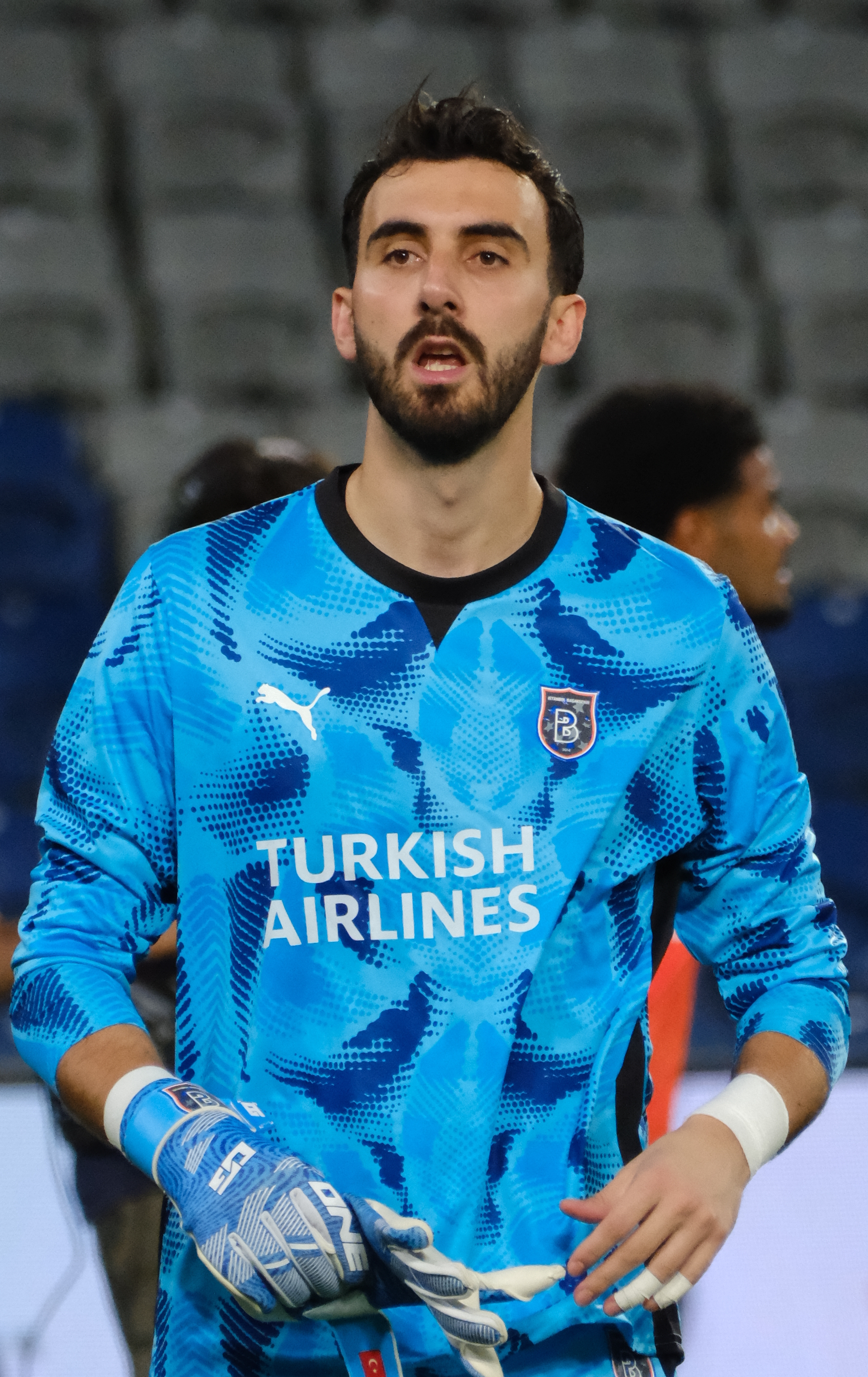
- Muhammed Şengezer in 2025

Personal information
- Full name: Muhammed Şengezer
- Date of birth: 5 January 1997 (age 29)
- Place of birth: Osmangazi, Turkey
- Height: 1.92 m (6 ft 4 in)
- Position: Goalkeeper

Team information
- Current team: İstanbul Başakşehir
- Number: 16

Youth career
- 2007–2009: Bursa Yolspor
- 2009–2015: Bursaspor

Senior career*
Years	Team	Apps	(Gls)
2015–2019	Bursaspor	12	(0)
2015–2016	→ Yeşil Bursa A.Ş. (loan)	24	(0)
2019–	İstanbul Başakşehir	100	(0)
2020	→ Adana Demirspor (loan)	10	(0)
2021	→ Adana Demirspor (loan)	6	(0)

International career^{‡}
2014–2015	Turkey U18	4	(0)
2015–2016	Turkey U19	7	(0)
2017–2018	Turkey U21	9	(0)
2024–	Turkey	1	(0)
- * Club domestic league appearances and goals as of 30 May 2026 ‡ National team caps and goals as of 19 March 2024

Muhammed Şengezer (born 5 January 1997) is a Turkish professional footballer who plays as a goalkeeper for İstanbul Başakşehir and the Turkey national team.

== Career ==
Muhammed is a youth product of Bursaspor, and was loaned to Yeşil Bursa A.Ş. in the TFF Second League where he was a starter for the team at 18 years of age. Muhammed made his professional debut for Bursaspor in a 2-1 Süper Lig win over Kardemir Karabükspor on 26 November 2017.

On 2 September 2019, he signed 5-year contract with İstanbul Başakşehir.

== International ==
On 14 March 2025, Şengezer was called up by Vincenzo Montella to the Turkey national team for the 2024–25 UEFA Nations League promotion/relegation play-offs against Hungary.

== Career statistics ==
As of match played 16 May 2026.

Appearances and goals by club, season and competition
Club	Season	League			Cup		Continental		Other		Total	
Club	Season	Division	Apps	Goals	Apps	Goals	Apps	Goals	Apps	Goals	Apps	Goals
Bursaspor	2016–17	Süper Lig	0	0	1	0	—		—		1	0
Bursaspor	2017–18	Süper Lig	3	0	5	0	—		—		8	0
Bursaspor	2018–19	Süper Lig	9	0	1	0	—		—		10	0
Bursaspor	Total		12	0	7	0	—		—		19	0
Yeşil Bursa A.Ş. (loan)	2015–16	3. Lig	24	0	0	0	—		—		24	0
İstanbul Başakşehir	2020–21	Süper Lig	0	0	0	0	—		0	0	0	0
İstanbul Başakşehir	2021–22	Süper Lig	7	0	1	0	—		—		8	0
İstanbul Başakşehir	2022–23	Süper Lig	12	0	4	0	5	0	—		21	0
İstanbul Başakşehir	2023–24	Süper Lig	14	0	0	0	—		—		14	0
İstanbul Başakşehir	2024–25	Süper Lig	34	0	2	0	9	0	—		45	0
İstanbul Başakşehir	2025–26	Süper Lig	33	0	1	0	5	0	—		39	0
İstanbul Başakşehir	Total		100	0	8	0	19	0	0	0	27	0
Adana Demirspor (loan)	2019–20	1. Lig	10	0	—		—		—		10	0
Adana Demirspor (loan)	2020–21	1. Lig	6	0	—		—		—		6	0
Career total			152	0	15	0	19	0	0	0	186	0
