= Serdar Gürler =

Turkish footballer (born 1991)

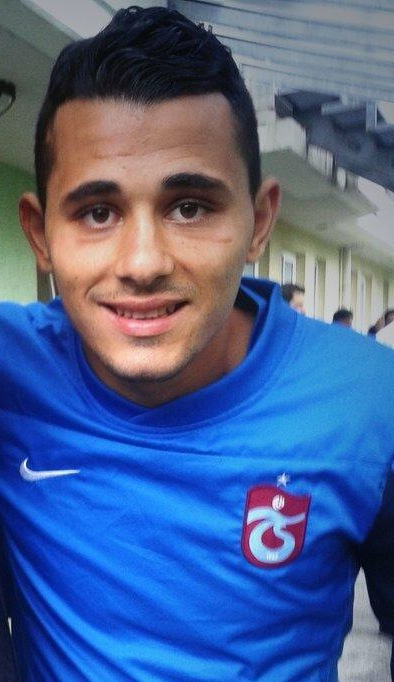

Personal information
- Date of birth: 14 September 1991 (age 35)
- Place of birth: Haguenau, France
- Height: 1.75 m (5 ft 9 in)
- Positions: Right winger; forward

Team information
- Current team: Iğdır
- Number: 17

Youth career
- 2004–2010: Sochaux

Senior career*
| Years | Team | Apps | (Gls) |
| 2010–2012 | Sochaux B | 43 | (11) |
| 2010–2012 | Sochaux | 2 | (0) |
| 2012–2014 | Elazığspor | 54 | (7) |
| 2014–2016 | Trabzonspor | 7 | (0) |
| 2015 | → Kayseri Erciyesspor (loan) | 10 | (1) |
| 2016–2017 | Gençlerbirliği | 43 | (14) |
| 2017–2018 | Osmanlıspor | 29 | (12) |
| 2018–2020 | Huesca | 13 | (0) |
| 2019–2020 | → Göztepe (loan) | 41 | (9) |
| 2020–2021 | Antalyaspor | 15 | (0) |
| 2021–2022 | Konyaspor | 18 | (4) |
| 2022–2025 | İstanbul Başakşehir | 80 | (10) |
| 2025–2026 | Eyüpspor | 17 | (0) |
| 2026 | Çorum | 19 | (6) |
| 2026– | Iğdır | 5 | (3) |

International career^{‡}
| 2008–2009 | Turkey U18 | 8 | (2) |
| 2010 | Turkey U19 | 2 | (0) |
| 2010 | Turkey U21 | 1 | (0) |
| 2013–2014 | Turkey A2 | 2 | (1) |
| 2017– | Turkey | 7 | (1) |
- * Club domestic league appearances and goals as of 14 October 2026 ‡ National team caps and goals as of 31 March 2019

Serdar Gürler (born 14 September 1991) is a professional footballer who plays as a right winger or forward for TFF 1. Lig club Iğdır. Born in France, he represents Turkey at international level.

== Career ==
Gürler plays as an attacking midfielder and is capable of playing on both wings and as a support striker. He made his professional debut on 10 April 2010 in a league match against Saint-Étienne. On 2 September 2010, Gürler signed his first professional contract agreeing to a three-year deal with Sochaux until June 2013. On 2 July 2011, he joined Samsunspor on loan until the end of the 2011–12 Süper Lig.

Gürler joined Osmanlıspor in June 2017.

On 7 August 2018, Gürler joined Huesca in La Liga.

He went on loan to Göztepe in January 2019.

On 13 January 2022, Gürler signed a three-and-a-half-year deal with İstanbul Başakşehir.

== International career ==
Gürler was born in France to Turkish parents. He was a Turkish youth international having earned caps with the under-18 and under-19 teams. He made his international debut for the Turkey national football team in a friendly 3–1 win over Moldova on 27 March 2017.

== Career statistics ==
As of 31 March 2014

=== Club ===
| Club | Season | League | | Cup | | League Cup | | Europe | | Total | |
| Club | Season | Apps | Goals | Apps | Goals | Apps | Goals | Apps | Goals | Apps | Goals |
|---|---|---|---|---|---|---|---|---|---|---|---|
| Sochaux | 2009–10 | 1 | 0 | - | | - | | - | | 1 | 0 |
| Sochaux | 2010–11 | - | | - | | 1 | 0 | - | | 1 | 0 |
| Sochaux | 2011–12 | 1 | 0 | - | | - | | - | | 1 | 0 |
| Sochaux | Total | 2 | 0 | 0 | 0 | 1 | 0 | 0 | 0 | 3 | 0 |
| Elazığspor | 2012–13 | 23 | 6 | 2 | 2 | - | | - | | 25 | 8 |
| Elazığspor | 2013–14 | 31 | 1 | 9 | 3 | - | | - | | 40 | 4 |
| Elazığspor | Total | 54 | 7 | 11 | 5 | 0 | 0 | 0 | 0 | 65 | 12 |
| Trabzonspor | 2014–15 | 7 | 0 | 4 | 2 | 0 | 0 | 0 | 0 | 11 | 2 |
| Trabzonspor | 2015–16 | 0 | 0 | 0 | 0 | 0 | 0 | 0 | 0 | 0 | 0 |
| Trabzonspor | Total | 7 | 0 | 4 | 2 | 0 | 0 | 0 | 0 | 11 | 2 |
| Kayseri Erciyesspor (loan) | 2014–15 | 10 | 1 | 0 | 0 | 0 | 0 | 0 | 0 | 10 | 1 |
| Kayseri Erciyesspor (loan) | Total | 10 | 1 | 0 | 0 | 0 | 0 | 0 | 0 | 10 | 1 |
| Gençlerbirliği | 2015–16 | 2 | 0 | 0 | 0 | 0 | 0 | 0 | 0 | 2 | 0 |
| Gençlerbirliği | Total | 2 | 0 | 0 | 0 | 0 | 0 | 0 | 0 | 2 | 0 |
| Career total | | 75 | 8 | 15 | 7 | 1 | 0 | 0 | 0 | 91 | 15 |

== International goals ==
| No. | Date | Venue | Opponent | Score | Result | Competition |
|---|---|---|---|---|---|---|
| 1. | 25 September 2022 | Tórsvøllur, Tórshavn, Faroe Islands | Faroe Islands | 1–2 | 1–2 | 2022–23 UEFA Nations League |
