= Efe Arda Koyuncu =

Turkish association footballer

Personal information
- Date of birth: 8 July 2005 (age 21)
- Place of birth: Istanbul, Turkey
- Height: 1.82 m (6 ft 0 in)
- Position: Centre-back

Team information
- Current team: İstanbul Başakşehir

Youth career
- 2014–2015: Bayrampaşa Demirspor
- 2015–2017: İstanbul Başakşehir
- 2017–2018: Haliç
- 2018–2022: İstanbul Başakşehir

Senior career*
Years	Team	Apps	(Gls)
2022–	İstanbul Başakşehir	1	(0)
2024–2025	→ Şanlıurfaspor (loan)	1	(0)
2025	→ Kepezspor (loan)	8	(0)
2025–2026	→ Galata SK (loan)	13	(0)

International career^{‡}
2021–2022	Turkey U17	15	(0)
2022	Turkey U18	2	(0)
- * Club domestic league appearances and goals as of 18 April 2026 ‡ National team caps and goals as of 28 November 2022

Efe Arda Koyuncu (born 8 July 2005) is a Turkish professional footballer who plays as a centre-back for Süper Lig club İstanbul Başakşehir.

== Career ==
Koyuncu is a youth product of Bayrampaşa Demirspor, Haliç, and İstanbul Başakşehir, before joining the latter's senior team in 2022. On 13 April 2022, he signed his first professional contract with İstanbul Başakşehir, keeping him at the club until June 2025. He made his professional debut with İstanbul Başakşehir in a 0–0 Süper Lig tie with Galatasaray on 7 May 2022, where he was a starter and played the entire match. At 16 years old and 10 months, Koyuncu is the youngest professional debutant in the history of İstanbul Başakşehir, taking the record from Ravil Tagir.

== International career ==
Koyuncu is a youth international for Turkey, having represented the Turkey U17s.
