= Philippe Kény =

Senegalese footballer

Personal information
- Full name: Philippe Paulin Kény
- Date of birth: 18 May 1999 (age 27)
- Place of birth: Tivaouane, Senegal
- Height: 1.90 m (6 ft 3 in)
- Position: Forward

Team information
- Current team: FC Zürich
- Number: 19

Senior career*
Years	Team	Apps	(Gls)
2019	Tours II	2	(1)
2019	Tours	8	(2)
2019–2021	Châteauroux II	4	(2)
2019–2021	Châteauroux	43	(2)
2021–2022	Bandırmaspor	34	(13)
2022–2025	İstanbul Başakşehir	82	(9)
2025–	FC Zürich	41	(16)

International career^{‡}
2019–	Senegal B	1	(1)
- * Club domestic league appearances and goals as of 28 September 2026 ‡ National team caps and goals as of 4 November 2019

Philippe Paulin Kény (born 18 May 1999) is a Senegalese professional footballer who plays as a forward for FC Zürich.

== Club career ==
On 17 July 2019, Keny signed his first professional contract with LB Châteauroux for three years. He made his professional debut with Châteauroux in a 1–0 Ligue 2 loss to Paris FC on 18 October 2019.

On 24 June 2021, he signed with Bandırmaspor in Turkey for one season with an option to extend.

In August 2025, Keny signed for Swiss Super League club FC Zürich.

== International career ==
Kény scored on his debut with the Senegal national football team at the 2019 WAFU Cup of Nations, in a 1–0 win over Benin on 3 October 2019.
