= Deniz Türüç =

Turkish footballer

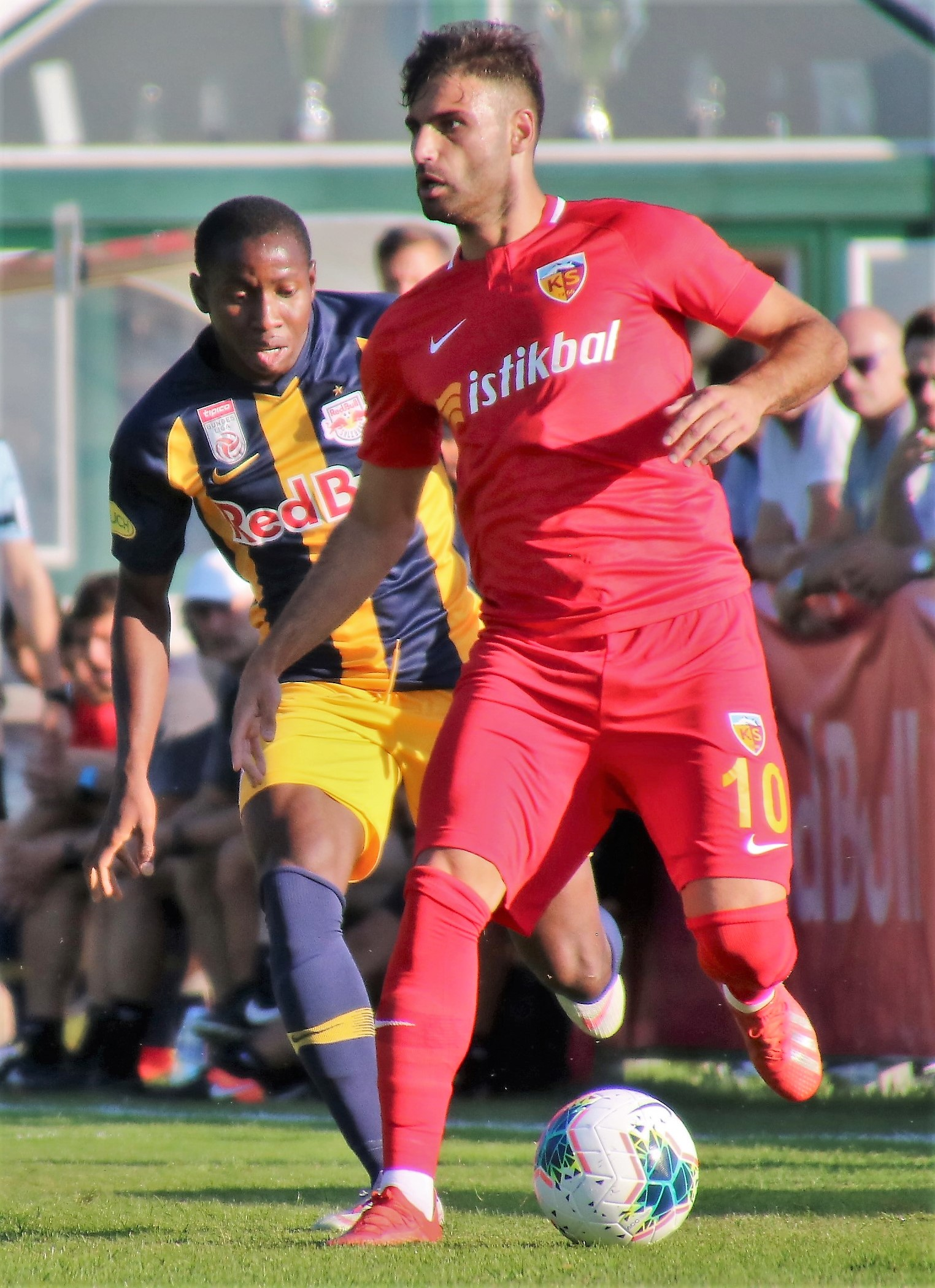

Personal information
- Full name: Deniz Türüç
- Date of birth: 29 January 1993 (age 33)
- Place of birth: Enschede, Netherlands
- Height: 1.77 m (5 ft 10 in)
- Position: Midfielder

Team information
- Current team: Konyaspor
- Number: 9

Youth career
- Enschedese Boys
- -2011: Twente
- 2011-2012: De Graafschap

Senior career*
Years	Team	Apps	(Gls)
2012–2015	Go Ahead Eagles	82	(5)
2015–2019	Kayserispor	121	(21)
2019–2021	Fenerbahçe	29	(3)
2020–2021	→ İstanbul Başakşehir (loan)	31	(2)
2021–2026	İstanbul Başakşehir	166	(22)
2026–	Konyaspor	15	(2)

International career
2012	Turkey U19	1	(0)
2013	Netherlands U20	2	(0)
2015	Turkey B	1	(0)
2017–2022	Turkey	12	(2)
- * Club domestic league appearances and goals as of 22 August 2026

Deniz Türüç (born 29 January 1993) is a footballer who plays as a midfielder for Konyaspor. Born in the Netherlands, he represents Turkey at international level.

== Club career ==
In August 2019, Türüç signed a three-year deal with Turkish Süper Lig side Fenerbahçe

In November 2020, whilst on loan at İstanbul Başakşehir, he scored via a free kick against Manchester United at Old Trafford in a 4–1 defeat in the UEFA Champions League.

== International career ==
Türüç was born in the Netherlands to Turkish parents. He made his international debut for the Turkey national football team in a friendly 3–1 win over Moldova on 27 March 2017.

== Career statistics ==
=== Club ===
As of match played on 27 September 2020

Appearances and goals by club, season and competition
Club	Season	League			Cup		League Cup		Other		Total	
Club	Season	Division	Apps	Goals	Apps	Goals	Apps	Goals	Apps	Goals	Apps	Goals
Go Ahead Eagles	2012–13	Eerste Divisie	22	0	2	0	—		6	1	30	1
Go Ahead Eagles	2013–14	Eredivisie	31	3	2	0	—				33	3
Go Ahead Eagles	2014–15	Eredivisie	29	2	1	0	—		2	0	32	2
Go Ahead Eagles	2015–16	Eredivisie	0	0	0	0	—		2	1	2	1
Go Ahead Eagles	Total		82	5	5	0	0	0	10	2	97	7
Kayserispor	2015–16	Süper Lig	32	2	8	3	—		—		40	5
Kayserispor	2016–17	Süper Lig	32	11	6	0	—		—		38	11
Kayserispor	2017–18	Süper Lig	31	5	6	4	—		—		37	9
Kayserispor	2018–19	Süper Lig	26	3	3	0	—		—		29	3
Kayserispor	Total		121	21	23	7	0	0	0	0	144	28
Fenerbahçe	2019–20	Süper Lig	26	3	9	3	—		—		35	6
Fenerbahçe	2020–21	Süper Lig	3	0	0	0	—		—		3	0
Fenerbahçe	Total		29	3	9	3	0	0	0	0	38	6
İstanbul Başakşehir	2020–21	Süper Lig	0	0	0	0	—		0	0	0	0
Career totals			232	30	37	10	0	0	10	2	279	42

=== International goals ===
Scores and results list, Turkey's goal tally first.

No.	Date	Venue	Opponent	Score	Result	Competition
1.	10 September 2019	Zimbru Stadium, Chișinău, Moldova	Moldova	2–0	4–0	UEFA Euro 2020 qualification
2.	11 November 2020	Vodafone Park, Istanbul, Turkey	Croatia	2–1	3–3	Friendly
