= Muhammed Emin Sarıkaya =

Turkish footballer

Personal information
- Date of birth: 3 January 2002 (age 24)
- Place of birth: Oltu, Turkey
- Height: 1.82 m (6 ft 0 in)
- Position: Midfielder

Team information
- Current team: Fatih Karagümrük
- Number: 25

Youth career
- 2013–2014: Murat Hüdavendigar
- 2014–2018: Bursaspor

Senior career*
Years	Team	Apps	(Gls)
2018–2019	Bursaspor	1	(0)
2019–2024	İstanbul Başakşehir	4	(0)
2021–2022	→ Yeni Malatyaspor (loan)	4	(0)
2022–2023	→ Ankara Keçiörengücü (loan)	1	(0)
2023	→ Ümraniyespor (loan)	0	(0)
2023–2024	→ Kastamonuspor 1966 (loan)	19	(0)
2024–2026	1461 Trabzon	60	(3)
2026–	Fatih Karagümrük	10	(0)

International career^{‡}
2017	Turkey U15	1	(0)
2017–2018	Turkey U16	9	(0)
2018–2019	Turkey U17	22	(1)
2019–2020	Turkey U18	7	(1)
2020	Turkey U19	2	(0)
- * Club domestic league appearances and goals as of 19 October 2026 ‡ National team caps and goals as of 13 October 2020

Muhammed Emin Sarıkaya (born 3 January 2002) is a Turkish professional footballer who plays as a midfielder for TFF 1. Lig club Fatih Karagümrük.

== Professional career ==
Muhammed signed his first professional contract with his youth club Bursaspor on 16 May 2018 at the age of 16. Muhammed Emin made his professional debut for Bursaspor in a 1-0 Süper Lig loss to Gençlerbirliği S.K. on 18 May 2018. He made his debut at the age of 16 years, 4 months and 15 days, making him the 4th youngest debutant in the history of the Süper Lig and the first born in 2002.

On 2 September 2019, he has signed 3-year contract with İstanbul Başakşehir.
