= 2020–21 Göztepe S.K. season =

Göztepe
2020–21 season
- Chairman: Mehmet Sepil
- Manager: İlhan Palut (until 10 January 2021); Ünal Karaman (from 20 January 2021)
- Stadium: Gürsel Aksel Stadium
- Süper Lig: 9th
- Turkish Cup: Fifth round
- Top goalscorer: League: Cherif Ndiaye (8); All: Cherif Ndiaye (10)
Home colours	Away colours

The 2020–21 season is Göztepe S.K.'s 96th season in existence and the club's fourth consecutive season in the top flight of Turkish football. In addition to the domestic league, Göztepe will participate in this season's edition of the Turkish Cup. The season covers the period from July 2020 to 30 June 2021.

== Players ==
=== Current squad ===
As of 6 October 2020

Note: Flags indicate national team as defined under FIFA eligibility rules; some limited exceptions apply. Players may hold more than one non-FIFA nationality.

No.	Pos.	Nation	Player
3	DF	BIH	Marko Mihojević
4	DF	BRA	Titi
5	DF	TUR	Alpaslan Öztürk
6	MF	TUR	Kubilay Sönmez
7	MF	TUR	Halil Akbunar
8	MF	TUR	Soner Aydoğdu (on loan from İstanbul Başakşehir)
9	FW	SEN	Cherif Ndiaye (on loan from Gorica)
10	MF	BRA	Márcio Mossoró
11	MF	NOR	Zlatko Tripić
12	MF	BRA	Guilherme (on loan from Alvarenga)
13	GK	TUR	Arda Özçimen
16	GK	HUN	Balázs Megyeri
17	MF	GAB	André Biyogo Poko
20	DF	SEN	Lamine Gassama

No.	Pos.	Nation	Player
22	FW	NGR	Brown Ideye
28	MF	TUR	Metin Yıldırım
30	MF	TUR	Yalçın Kayan
33	DF	TUR	Atınç Nukan
41	DF	TUR	Berkan Emir
54	MF	TUR	Batuhan Kırdaroğlu
60	MF	NGR	Obinna Nwobodo
66	MF	TUR	Burak Süleyman
68	DF	BIH	Dženan Bureković
70	GK	TUR	İrfan Can Eğribayat
77	DF	TUR	Murat Paluli
90	MF	TUR	Efe Binici
99	FW	ITA	Stefano Napoleoni

== Transfers ==
=== In ===
No.	Pos	Player	Transferred from	Fee	Date	Source
15			TBD		1 July 2020	

=== Out ===
No.	Pos	Player	Transferred to	Fee	Date	Source
15			TBD		1 July 2020	

== Pre-season and friendlies ==
Win Draw Loss Fixtures

== Competitions ==
=== Overview ===
Competition	First match	Last match	Starting round	Final position	Record							
Competition	First match	Last match	Starting round	Final position	Pld	W	D	L	GF	GA	GD	Win %
Süper Lig	12 September 2020	May 2021	Matchday 1		27	9	9	9	37	32	+5	33.33
Turkish Cup	26 November 2020	15 December 2020	Fourth round	Fifth round	2	1	0	1	6	5	+1	50.00
Total					29	10	9	10	43	37	+6	34.48

Last updated: 4 March 2020
Source: Soccerway

=== Süper Lig ===
==== League table ====
Pos	Team	Pld	W	D	L	GF	GA	GD	Pts
8	Fatih Karagümrük	40	16	12	12	64	52	+12	60
9	Gaziantep	40	15	13	12	59	51	+8	58
10	Göztepe	40	13	12	15	59	59	0	51
11	Konyaspor	40	12	14	14	49	48	+1	50
12	Başakşehir	40	12	12	16	43	55	−12	48

Source: Süper Lig, Soccerway
Rules for classification: 1) Points; 2) Head-to-head points; 3) Head-to-head goal difference; 4) Head-to-head goals scored; 5) Goal difference; 6) Goals scored; 7) Play-off.

==== Results summary ====
Overall								Home						Away					
Pld	W	D	L	GF	GA	GD	Pts	W	D	L	GF	GA	GD	W	D	L	GF	GA	GD
27	9	9	9	37	32	+5	36	6	4	3	24	14	+10	3	5	6	13	18	−5

Last updated: 4 March 2020.
Source: Süper Lig

==== Results by round ====
Round	1	2	3	4	5	6	7	8	9	10	11	12	13	14	15	16	17	18	19	20	21	22	23	24	25	26	27	28	29	30	31	32	33	34	35	36	37	38	39	40	41	42
Ground	H	A	H	A	H	A	H	A	H	A	H	A	H	A	H	B	A	H	A	H	A	A	H	A	H	A	H	A	H	A	H	A	H	A	H	A	B	H	A	H	A	H
Result	W	D	D	D	L	D	W	D	W	W	D	L	L	L	D	B	L	L	W	W	L	L	D	L	W	W	W	D														
Position	1	3	7	8	10	10	8	8	5	4	5	5	9	11	11	11	13	16	14	10	11	11	11	12	11	10	9	9														

Updated to match(es) played on 4 March 2021. Source: Süper Lig
A = Away; H = Home; B = Bye; W = Win; D = Draw; L = Loss

Note: Since the league has been expanded to 21 teams each team will earn a bye twice this season.

==== Matches ====
12 September 2020 1	Göztepe	5–1	Denizlispor	İzmir
20:00 TRT (UTC+3)		Report		Stadium: Gürsel Aksel Stadium; Attendance: 0 Referee: Tugay Kaan Numanoğlu

18 September 2020 2	Yeni Malatyaspor	1–1	Göztepe	Malatya
20:00 TRT (UTC+3)	Büyük 30' (pen.)	Report	Akbunar 19'	Stadium: Malatya Arena; Attendance: 0 Referee: Cüneyt Çakιr; Fourth official: Onur Karabas

26 September 2020 3	Göztepe	2–2	Gaziantep	İzmir
16:00 TRT (UTC+3)		Report		Stadium: Gürsel Aksel Stadium; Attendance: 0 Referee: Yasin Kol

30 November 2020 10	Sivasspor	0–1	Göztepe	Sivas
19:30	Cofie (yellow card) 59'	Report	Akbunar (yellow card) 46' (goal) 80'; Kayan (yellow card) 57'; Ndiaye (yellow card) 88'	Stadium: 4 Eylül Stadium; Attendance: 0 Referee: Serkan Tokat

5 December 2020 11	Göztepe	1–1	Kayserispor	Göztepe
13:30	Aydoğdu 86'	Report	Henrique 73'	Stadium: Gürsel Aksel Stadium; Attendance: 0 Referee: Yaşar Kemal; Fourth official: Mustafa Kürşad Filiz

9 December 2020 7	Göztepe	1–0	Alanyaspor	İzmir
18:30	Sönmez (yellow card) 65'; Tripić 70'; Öztürk (yellow card) 72'	Report	Uçan (yellow card) 45'; Siopis (yellow card) 65'; Bareiro (yellow card) 90+11'	Stadium: Gürsel Aksel Stadium; Attendance: 0 Referee: Ali Şansalan

26 December 2020 15	Göztepe	1–1	Fatih Karagümrük	Göztepe
16:00	Ndiaye 11'	Report	Biglia 77'	Stadium: Gürsel Aksel Stadium; Attendance: 0 Referee: Sarper Baris Saka; Assistant referees: Serkan Olguncan, Mustafa Savranlar; Fourth official: Abdullah Taşkınsoy

9 January 2021 18	Göztepe	0–1	Antalyaspor	İzmir
16:00 TRT (UTC+3)	Paluli (yellow card) 8'; Mihojević (yellow card) 50'; Aydoğdu (yellow card) 55'	Report	(yellow card) 72' Fredy; 77' Sinik	Stadium: Gürsel Aksel Stadium; Attendance: 0 Referee: Mert Güzenge

19 January 2021 20	Göztepe	4–0	Gençlerbirliği	İzmir
16:00 TRT (UTC+3)		Report		Stadium: Gürsel Aksel Stadium; Attendance: 0 Referee: Burak Şeker

24 January 2021 21	Beşiktaş	2–1	Göztepe	Istanbul
19:00 TRT (UTC+3)	Ljajić 49'; Rosier (yellow card) 51'; Aboubakar 77'; Destanoğlu (yellow card) 90+4'	Report	Ndiaye (yellow card) 38'; Tripić 39'; Aydoğdu (yellow card) 45+1'; Žulj (yellow card) 45+1'	Stadium: Vodafone Park; Attendance: 0 Referee: Ali Sansalan

4 February 2021 23	Göztepe	2–2	Yeni Malatyaspor	Göztepe
16:00 TRT (UTC+3)	Ndiaye 13', 78'	Report	Mallan 39'; Ildiz 81'	Stadium: Gürsel Aksel Stadium; Attendance: 0 Referee: Turgut Doman; Fourth official: Cihan Aydın

28 February 2021 27	Göztepe	1–0	Kasımpaşa	Göztepe
16:00 TRT (UTC+3)	Aydoğdu (yellow card) 20'; Ndiaye 25'; Emir (yellow card) 72' (yellow-red card) 84'	Report	Luckassen (red card) 15'; Kara (yellow card) 35'; Erdoğan (yellow card) 53'	Stadium: Gürsel Aksel Stadium; Attendance: 0 Referee: Suat Arslanboga; Fourth official: Cihan Aydın

4 March 2021 28	Alanyaspor	1–1	Göztepe	Alanya
16:00 TRT (UTC+3)	Tzavellas 54'	Report	Aksoy 43' (o.g.)	Stadium: Bahçeşehir Okulları Stadium; Attendance: 0 Referee: Tugay Kaan Numanoğlu

15 May 2021 42	Göztepe	1–2	Beşiktaş	İzmir
20:30 TRT (UTC+3)	Öztürk 24'; Akbunar (yellow card) 42'	Report	Vida 10'; Ghezzal 69'; Destanoglu (yellow card) 90+4'	Stadium: Gürsel Aksel Stadium; Attendance: 0 Referee: Fırat Aydınus

=== Turkish Cup ===
26 November 2020 Fourth round	Göztepe	2–0	Kırklarelispor	İzmir
21:00 TRT (UTC+3)	Akbunar 83'; Guilherme 90+4' (pen.)	Report		Stadium: Gürsel Aksel Stadium; Referee: Alper Çetin

15 December 2020 Fifth round	Göztepe	4–5 (a.e.t.)	Bursaspor	İzmir
18:30 TRT (UTC+3)	Ideye 32'; Köz 73' (o.g.); Ndiaye 84', 117'	Report	Kör 31', 47', 99', 120+3'; Yılmaz 90+5'	Stadium: Gürsel Aksel Stadium; Referee: Emre Malok
