= 2019–20 Göztepe S.K. season =

Göztepe S.K.
2019–20 season
- Chairman: Mehmet Sepil
- Manager: İlhan Palut
- Stadium: Bornova Stadium
- Süper Lig: 11th
- Turkish Cup: Round of 16
- Top goalscorer: Serdar Gürler (7)
Home colours	Away colours	Third colours

The 2019–20 season was Göztepe S.K.'s 95th year in existence. In addition to the domestic league, Göztepe S.K. participated in the Turkish Cup.

== Squad ==
As of 31 January 2020

Note: Flags indicate national team as defined under FIFA eligibility rules; some limited exceptions apply. Players may hold more than one non-FIFA nationality.

No.	Pos.	Nation	Player
1	GK	TUR	Göktuğ Bakırbaş
4	DF	BRA	Titi
5	MF	TUR	Alpaslan Öztürk
6	MF	CRC	Celso Borges
7	MF	TUR	Halil Akbunar
8	MF	POR	André Castro
10	MF	BRA	Márcio Mossoró
11	FW	TUR	Serdar Gürler (on loan from Huesca)
13	GK	POR	Beto (Captain)
15	MF	TUR	Kerem Atakan Kesgin
17	MF	GAB	André Biyogo Poko
18	FW	TUR	Ege Özkayımoğlu
19	MF	TUR	Hüseyin Bulut
20	DF	SEN	Lamine Gassama

No.	Pos.	Nation	Player
21	FW	POL	Kamil Wilczek
24	GK	TUR	Eren Bilen
25	DF	BRA	Wallace Reis
27	FW	NOR	Zlatko Tripić
30	MF	TUR	Yalçın Kayan
32	FW	ENG	Cameron Jerome
33	DF	TUR	Atınç Nukan
41	DF	TUR	Berkan Emir
48	GK	TUR	Arda Özçimen
55	DF	FRA	Léo Schwechlen
63	FW	TUR	Deniz Kadah
77	DF	TUR	Murat Paluli
88	MF	TUR	Soner Aydoğdu (on loan from İstanbul Başakşehir)
99	FW	ITA	Stefano Napoleoni

== Süper Lig ==
=== League table ===
Pos	Team	Pld	W	D	L	GF	GA	GD	Pts
9	Antalyaspor	34	11	12	11	41	52	−11	45
10	Kasımpaşa	34	12	7	15	53	58	−5	43
11	Göztepe	34	11	9	14	44	49	−5	42
12	Gençlerbirliği	34	9	9	16	39	56	−17	36 (Note: Head-to-head points: Gençlerbirliği 4, Konyaspor 1)
13	Konyaspor	34	8	12	14	36	52	−16	36

Source: Süper Lig, Soccerway
Rules for classification: 1) Points; 2) Head-to-head points; 3) Head-to-head goal difference; 4) Head-to-head goals scored; 5) Goal difference; 6) Goals scored; 7) Play-off.

=== Results summary ===
Overall								Home						Away					
Pld	W	D	L	GF	GA	GD	Pts	W	D	L	GF	GA	GD	W	D	L	GF	GA	GD
32	10	9	13	40	45	−5	39	5	6	5	23	25	−2	5	3	8	17	20	−3

Source: TFF

=== Results by round ===
Round	1	2	3	4	5	6	7	8	9	10	11	12	13	14	15	16	17	18	19	20	21	22	23	24	25	26	27	28	29	30	31	32	33	34
Ground	H	A	H	A	H	A	H	A	H	A	H	A	H	A	A	H	A	A	H	A	H	A	H	A	H	A	H	A	H	A	H	H	A	H
Result	L	L	D	D	W	D	W	L	L	W	D	W	D	W	L	W	L	W	W	D	W	W	D	L	L	L	L	L	D	L	D	L		
Position	13	18	17	16	13	15	11	11	15	12	11	9	10	9	10	9	10	8	8	8	8	7	7	8	8	8	8	8	8	8	9	10		

Updated to match(es) played on 16 July 2020. Source: TFF.org
A = Away; H = Home; W = Win; D = Draw; L = Loss

== Matches ==
18 August 2019 1	Göztepe	0 - 1	Antalyaspor	İzmir
21.45	Cristian Chagas Tarouco (yellow card) 22'; André Biyogo Poko (yellow card) 55'; Lamine Gassama (yellow card) 80'	Report	29' Diego Ângelo; (yellow card) 34' Hakan Özmert; (yellow card) 64' Ondřej Čelůstka; (yellow card) 81' Ferhat Kaplan	Stadium: Bornova Stadium; Referee: Zorbay Küçük; Assistant referees: Serkan Ok, Yusuf Bozdoğan; Fourth official: Burak Pakkan; Fifth official: Suat Arslanboğa, Esat Sancaktar

23 August 2019 2	Beşiktaş	3 - 0	Göztepe	Istanbul
20.30	Güven Yalçın 45'; Caner Erkin 54'; Adem Ljajić 59'; Víctor Ruiz (yellow card) 73'	Report	(yellow card) 73' André Biyogo Poko	Stadium: Vodafone Park; Referee: Ali Palabıyık; Assistant referees: Serkan Olguncan, Serkan Çimen; Fourth official: Özgür Yankaya; Fifth official: Yaşar Kemal Uğurlu, Tarık Ongun

31 August 2019 3	Göztepe	0 - 0	Denizlispor	İzmir
21.45	Titi (yellow card) 19'; André Castro (yellow card) 66'; Soner Aydoğdu (penalty missed) 75'; Eren Derdiyok (yellow card) 85'	Report	(yellow card) 10' Zakarya Bergdich; (yellow card) 38' (yellow card) 73' (red card) Tiago Lopes; (yellow card) 90' Adam Stachowiak	Stadium: Bornova Stadium; Referee: Suat Arslanboğa; Assistant referees: Mehmet Cem Satman, Mehmet Kısal; Fourth official: İlker Yasin Avcı; Fifth official: Burak Şeker, Çağdaş Altay

15 September 2019 4	Çaykur Rizespor	0 - 0	Göztepe	Rize
17.00	Joseph Larweh Attamah (yellow card) 53'; Fernando Boldrin (yellow card) 90'; Dario Melnjak (yellow card) 90'	Report	(yellow card) 25' Halil Akbunar; (yellow card) 45' Márcio Mossoró; (yellow card) 84' Alpaslan Öztürk; (yellow card) 90' Berkan Emir	Stadium: Yeni Rize Şehir Stadium; Referee: Abdulkadir Bitigen; Assistant referees: Mustafa Savranlar, Mehmet Salih Mazlum; Fourth official: Adem Sarıtaş; Fifth official: Özgüç Türkalp, Alper Çetin

20 September 2019 5	Göztepe	1 - 0	Konyaspor	İzmir
20.30	André Biyogo Poko (red card) 50'; Alpaslan Öztürk 76' (pen.); Beto (yellow card) 90'	Report	(yellow card) 73' Farouk Miya; (yellow card) 75' Amir Hadžiahmetović; (yellow card) 75' Marin Aničić	Stadium: Bornova Stadium; Attendance: 8.054; Referee: Özgür Yankaya; Assistant referees: Mehmet Metin, Abdullah Bora Özkara; Fourth official: Yalçın Taşkınfurat; Fifth official: Volkan Bayarslan, Kadir Sağlam

30 September 2019 6	Gaziantep	1 - 1	Göztepe	Gaziantep
20.00	Souleymane Diarra (yellow card) 31'; Güray Vural 58'; Júnior Morais (yellow card) 66'	Report	(red card) 50' Beto; (yellow card) 63' Serdar Gürler; 82' Berkan Emir; (yellow card) 89' Márcio Mossoró; (yellow card) 90' Göktuğ Bakırbaş; (yellow card) 90' Lamine Gassama	Stadium: New Gaziantep Stadium; Attendance: 7.676; Referee: Ali Şansalan; Assistant referees: Erdinç Sezertam, İsmail Şencan; Fourth official: Selim Özen; Fifth official: Mustafa Öğretmenoğlu, Ramazan Keleş

5 October 2019 7	Göztepe	4 - 0	Kayserispor	İzmir
17.30	Alpaslan Öztürk 7'; Serdar Gürler (penalty missed) 34'; Soner Aydoğdu 42'; Stefano Napoleoni 45', 50'; Titi (yellow card) 74'	Report	(yellow card) 41' Benoît Poulain; (yellow card) 29' Ben Rienstra	Stadium: Bornova Stadium; Attendance: 6.803; Referee: Cüneyt Çakır; Assistant referees: Tarık Ongun, Aleks Taşçıoğlu; Fourth official: Mustafa Kürşad Filiz; Fifth official: Mete Kalkavan, Kemal Yılmaz

19 October 2019 8	İstanbul Başakşehir	2 - 1	Göztepe	Istanbul
17.30	Fredrik Gulbrandsen 11'; Gökhan Inler (yellow card) 44'; Martin Škrtel 90+3'	Report	(yellow card) 42' Mossoró; (yellow card) 49' Alpaslan Öztürk; (yellow card) 50' André Biyogo Poko; 64' Soner Aydoğdu	Stadium: Başakşehir Fatih Terim Stadium; Attendance: 2.915; Referee: Yaşar Kemal Uğurlu; Assistant referees: Mehmet Kısal, Serkan Çimen; Fourth official: Demokrat Özgür Güneş; Fifth official: Burak Şeker, Kadir Sağlam

27 October 2019 9	Göztepe	1 - 4	Kasımpaşa	İzmir
16.30	Alpaslan Öztürk (yellow card) 16'; Beto (yellow card) 50'; Halil Akbunar (yellow card) 62'; Berkan Emir 45' (yellow card) 66'	Report	27' Haris Hajradinović; 51' (pen.) Ricardo Quaresma; 76' Mustafa Pektemek; 90+2' Yusuf Erdoğan	Stadium: Bornova Stadium; Attendance: 7.894; Referee: Ümit Öztürk; Assistant referees: Samet Çiçek, Osman Gökhan Bilir; Fourth official: Sinan Dereci; Fifth official: Bahattin Şimşek, Yasin Kol

2 November 2019 10	Trabzonspor	0 - 1	Göztepe	Trabzon
17.30		Report	31' (yellow card) 56' Cameron Jerome; (yellow card) 46' Soner Aydoğdu; (yellow card) 75' Mossoró	Stadium: Şenol Güneş Stadium; Attendance: 25.082; Referee: Fırat Aydınus; Assistant referees: Aleks Taşcıoğlu, Erdem Bayık; Fourth official: Çağdaş Altay; Fifth official: Koray Gençerler, Kerem Yılmaz

10 November 2019 11	Göztepe	1 - 1	Yeni Malatyaspor	İzmir
14.00	Serdar Gürler 9'; Soner Aydoğdu (yellow card) 60'; Cameron Jerome (yellow card) 67'; Berkan Emir (yellow card) 80'; Alpaslan Öztürk (yellow card) 87' (yellow card) 90+7' (red card); Celso Borges (yellow card) 83'	Report	(yellow card) 39' Afriyie Acquah; (yellow card) 59' Murat Yıldırım; (yellow card) 71' Teenage Hadebe; 83' (pen.) Gökhan Töre; (yellow card) 87' (yellow card) 90+7' (red card) Eren Tozlu; (yellow card) 88' Erkan Kaş	Stadium: Bornova Stadium; Attendance: 7.689; Referee: Arda Kardeşler; Assistant referees: İsmail Şencan, Alpaslan Dedeş; Fourth official: Mustafa Aydın; Fifth official: Tugay Kaan Numanoğlu, Murat Erdoğan

24 November 2019 12	Alanyaspor	0 - 1	Göztepe	Alanya, Antalya
16.30	Manolis Siopis (yellow card) 34'; Ceyhun Gülselam (yellow card) 36'; Baiano (yellow card) 82'	Report	(yellow card) 45+1' Soner Aydoğdu; 67' André Castro	Stadium: Bahçeşehir Okulları Stadium; Attendance: 5.693; Referee: Volkan Bayarslan; Assistant referees: Bahtiyar Birinci, Yusuf Bozdoğan; Fourth official: Şeref Taştan; Fifth official: Ali Palabıyık, Mert Güzenge

30 November 2019 13	Göztepe	2 - 2	Fenerbahçe	İzmir
20.00	André Castro 7'; Alpaslan Öztürk 63' (pen.); Lamine Gassama (yellow card) 73'	Report	44' Serdar Aziz; (yellow card) 50' Emre Belözoğlu; (yellow card) 57' (yellow card) 90' (red card) Luiz Gustavo; (yellow card) 61' Nabil Dirar; (yellow card) 61' Altay Bayındır; (yellow card) 63' Deniz Türüç; 68' Garry Rodrigues; (yellow card) 76' Serdar Aziz; (yellow card) 89' Jailson Siqueira	Stadium: Bornova Stadium; Attendance: 8.791; Referee: Abdulkadir Bitigen; Assistant referees: Serkan Ok, Mehmet Cem Hanoğlu; Fourth official: Mustafa İlker Coşkun; Fifth official: Fırat Aydınus, Bahattin Duran

7 December 2019 14	MKE Ankaragücü	1 - 3	Göztepe	Ankara
17.30	İlhan Parlak 31'; Hasan Kaya (yellow card) 76'; Alper Önal (yellow card) 90+2'	Report	1' Halil Akbunar; (yellow card) 37' Alpaslan Öztürk; 47', 57' Serdar Gürler; (yellow card) 51' Cameron Jerome; (yellow card) 89' Soner Aydoğdu	Stadium: Eryaman Stadium; Attendance: 9.091; Referee: Mete Kalkavan; Assistant referees: Ceyhun Sesigüzel, Esat Sancaktar; Fourth official: Burak Taşkınsoy; Fifth official: Özgür Yankaya, Ramazan Keleş

14 December 2019 15	Gençlerbirliği	3 - 1	Göztepe	Ankara
17.30	Bogdan Stancu 29' , (yellow card) 54' , (goal) 67'; Giovanni Sio 35'; Mats Seuntjens (yellow card) 64'; Baiano (yellow card) 90+3'	Report	33' Wallace Reis; (yellow card) 77' Berkan Emir	Stadium: Eryaman Stadium; Attendance: 4.037; Referee: Cüneyt Çakır; Assistant referees: Tarık Ongun, Bahattin Duran; Fourth official: Erkan Ergin; Fifth official: Suat Arslanboğa, Çağdaş Altay

21 December 2019 16	Göztepe	2 - 1	Galatasaray	İzmir
20.00	Lamine Gassama (yellow card) 5'; Cameron Jerome 9' (yellow card) 56'; Halil Akbunar 61'; Titi (yellow card) 83'	Report	27' (o.g.) Lamine Gassama; (yellow card) 75' Sofiane Feghouli; (yellow card) 88' Marcão	Stadium: Bornova Stadium; Attendance: 8.790; Referee: Serkan Tokat; Assistant referees: Kemal Yılmaz, Asım Yusuf Öz; Fourth official: Emre Malok; Fifth official: Atilla Karoğlan, Esat Sancaktar

29 December 2019 17	Sivasspor	1 - 0	Göztepe	Sivas
14.00	Mert Hakan Yandaş (yellow card) 35'; Mustapha Yatabaré 66'	Report	(yellow card) 81' Deniz Kadah	Stadium: New Sivas 4 Eylül Stadium; Attendance: 12.961; Referee: Yaşar Kemal Uğurlu; Assistant referees: Mehmet Cem Satman, Mustafa Sönmez; Fourth official: Burak Pakkan; Fifth official: Özgür Yankaya, Serkan Olguncan

19 January 2020 18	Antalyaspor	0 - 3	Göztepe	Antalya
13.30	Doğukan Sinik (yellow card) 24'; Diego Ângelo (yellow card) 40' (yellow card) 86' (red card); Hakan Özmert (yellow card) 44'	Report	16' Halil Akbunar; 36' Serdar Gürler; 44' (yellow card) 60' Soner Aydoğdu; (yellow card) 89' Yalçın Kayan	Stadium: New Antalya Stadium; Attendance: 8.288; Referee: Atilla Karaoğlan; Assistant referees: Mehmet Metin, Özgür Ertem; Fourth official: Sinan Dereci; Fifth official: Suat Arslanboğa, Mustafa Kürşad Filiz

26 January 2020 19	Göztepe	2 - 1	Beşiktaş	İzmir
16.00	André Castro (yellow card) 13'; Halil Akbunar 25'; Celso Borges 45+2'; Soner Aydoğdu (yellow card) 54'; Cameron Jerome (yellow card) 77'; Beto (yellow card) 90+4'	Report	38' (pen.) Burak Yılmaz; (yellow card) 46' Atiba Hutchinson; (yellow card) 52' Georges-Kévin Nkoudou; (yellow card) 67' Necip Uysal; (yellow card) 85' Domagoj Vida	Stadium: Gürsel Aksel Stadium; Attendance: 17.855; Referee: Hüseyin Göçek; Assistant referees: Esat Sancaktar, Serkan Ok; Fourth official: Kadir Sağlam; Fifth official: Bahattin Şimşek, Tarık Ongun

3 February 2020 20	Denizlispor	1 - 1	Göztepe	Denizli
20.00	Ismaïl Aissati (yellow card) 49'; Mustafa Yumlu (yellow card) 64'; Óscar Estupiñán 86'; Hüseyin Altıntaş (yellow card) 90'	Report	9' Serdar Gürler; (yellow card) 39' Lamine Gassama; (yellow card) 76' Soner Aydoğdu; (yellow card) 90' Beto	Stadium: Atatürk Stadyumu; Attendance: 8.986; Referee: Mustafa Öğretmenoğlu; Assistant referees: Samet Çavuş, Deniz Cafer Özkaral; Fourth official: Veli Karakaya; Fifth official: Emre Malok, Abdullah Buğra Taşkınsoy

17 March 2020 21	Göztepe	2 - 0	Çaykur Rizespor	İzmir
20.00	Berkan Emir 56'; Stefano Napoleoni 61' (yellow card) 66'	Report	(yellow card) 23' Fernando Boldrin; (yellow card) 66' Milan Škoda	Stadium: Gürsel Aksel Stadium; Attendance: 0 Referee: Mustafa Öğretmenoğlu; Assistant referees: Bilal Gölen, Osman Gökhan Bilir; Fourth official: Hüseyin Gökberk Arslan; Fifth official: Arda Kardeşler, Ceyhun Sesigüzel
Note: The match, which was postponed due to weather conditions on February 10th, was played on March 17th.

15 February 2020 22	Konyaspor	1 - 3	Göztepe	Konya
17.00	Guilherme Sityá (yellow card) 28'; Ömer Ali Şahiner 34'; Marko Jevtović (yellow card) 51'	Report	39' Serdar Gürler; 68' André Castro; 74' Halil Akbunar	Stadium: Büyükşehir Belediye Stadyumu; Attendance: 14.366; Referee: Ali Şansalan; Assistant referees: Alpaslan Dedeş, Mehmet Cem Hanoğlu; Fourth official: Selim Özen; Fifth official: Özgüç Türkalp, Erkan Engin

22 February 2020 23	Göztepe	1 - 1	Gaziantep	İzmir
17.00	Serdar Gürler (yellow card) 36'; Cameron Jerome 71'; Alpaslan Öztürk (yellow card) 90+2'	Report	(yellow card) 46' Andre Sousa; (yellow card) 58' Alexandru Maxim; (yellow card) 63' Olarenwaju Kayode; 90+2' Souleymane Diarra	Stadium: Gürsel Aksel Stadium; Attendance: 16.143; Referee: Suat Arslanboğa; Assistant referees: Özgür Ertem, Samet Çiçek; Fourth official: Sinan Dereci; Fifth official: Erkan Özdamar, Mustafa Kürşad Filiz

2 March 2020 24	Kayserispor	1 - 0	Göztepe	Kayseri
20.00	Artem Kravets (yellow card) 13'; Diego Ângelo (yellow card) 55'; Muris Mesanovic 70'; Pedro Henrique (yellow card) 83'; Aksel Aktas (yellow card) 89'	Report	(yellow card) 51' Serdar Gürler	Stadium: Kadir Has Şehir Stadyumu; Attendance: 6.969; Referee: Mete Kalkavan; Assistant referees: Ceyhun Sesigüzel, Esat Sancaktar; Fourth official: İlker Yasin Avcı; Fifth official: Özgüç Türkalp, Burak Pakkan

7 March 2020 25	Göztepe	0 - 3	İstanbul Başakşehir	İzmir
17.00	Soner Aydoğdu (yellow card) 16'	Report	(yellow card) 29' (red card) 83' Alexandru Epureanu; 40' Demba Ba; (yellow card) 43' Mahmut Tekdemir; 57' Enzo Crivelli; 90+3' İrfan Kahveci	Stadium: Gürsel Aksel Stadium; Attendance: 16.383; Referee: Ali Palabıyık; Assistant referees: Serkan Olguncan, Mustafa Sönmez; Fourth official: Mustafa İlker Coşkun; Fifth official: Abdulkadir Bitigen, Murat Erdoğan

13 March 2020 26	Kasımpaşa	2 - 0	Göztepe	Istanbul
20.00	Bengali-Fodé Koita 2', 90+3'; Zvonimir Šarlija (yellow card) 59'; Oussama Haddadi (yellow card) 71'; Aytaç Kara (yellow card) 73'	Report	(yellow card) 72' Berkan Emir; (yellow card) 86' Cameron Jerome	Stadium: Recep Tayyip Erdoğan Stadium; Attendance: 0 Referee: Halil Umut Meler; Assistant referees: Mustafa Emre Eyisoy, Kerem Ersoy; Fourth official: Direnç Tonusluoğlu; Fifth official: Ümit Öztürk, Çağdaş Altay

12 June 2020 27	Göztepe	1 - 3	Trabzonspor	İzmir
21.00	Alpaslan Öztürk 57' (pen.); Cameron Jerome (yellow card) 59'; Berkan Emir (yellow card) 79'	Report	16' Anthony Nwakaeme; (yellow card) 28' (yellow card) 41' (red card) Guilherme; 52' (pen.) Caleb Ekuban; (yellow card) 56' Manuel da Costa; 84' (o.g.) Berkan Emir	Stadium: Gürsel Aksel Stadium; Attendance: 0 Referee: Zorbay Küçük; Assistant referees: Hakan Yemişken, Kamil Çetin; Fourth official: Mert Güzenge; Fifth official: Ali Palabıyık, Abdullah Buğra Taşkınsoy

20 June 2020 28	Yeni Malatyaspor	2 - 1	Göztepe	Malatya
21.00	Umut Bulut 40'; Viðar Örn Kjartansson 78'; Teenage Hadebe (yellow card) 79'	Report	76' (pen.) (yellow card) 90+4' Alpaslan Öztürk	Stadium: Malatya Arena; Attendance: 0 Referee: Özgür Yankaya; Assistant referees: Mehmet Metin, Mehmet Cem Hanoğlu; Fourth official: Yasin Kol; Fifth official: Ali Şansalan, Adem Cinek

27 June 2020 29	Göztepe	3 - 3	Alanyaspor	İzmir
21.00	Serdar Gürler 11'; Celso Borges (yellow card) 22'; Alpaslan Öztürk (yellow card) 43' (goal) 49'; Titi (yellow card) 73'; Stefano Napoleoni 90'	Report	4' Efecan Karaca; (yellow card) 31' Steven Caulker; (yellow card) 42' Juanfran; 45+3', 64' Papiss Cissé	Stadium: Bornova Stadium; Attendance: 0 Referee: Yaşar Kemal Uğurlu; Assistant referees: Erdinç Sezertam, Serkan Çimen; Fourth official: Kadir Sağlam; Fifth official: Hüseyin Göçek, Erkan Engin

4 July 2020 30	Fenerbahçe	2 - 1	Göztepe	Istanbul
21.00	Ferdi Kadioglu 25', 45+2'; Serdar Aziz (yellow card) 54' (yellow card) 90+4' (red card)	Report	(yellow card) 49' Murat Paluli; 66' Soner Aydoğdu; (yellow card) 77' Alpaslan Öztürk	Stadium: Şükrü Saracoğlu Stadyumu; Attendance: 0 Referee: Bahattin Şimşek; Assistant referees: İsmail Şencan, Mehmet Kısal; Fourth official: Sarper Barış Saka; Fifth official: Suat Arslanboğa, Mustafa Kürşad Filiz

8 July 2020 31	Göztepe	2 - 2	MKE Ankaragücü	İzmir
21.00	Kamil Wilczek 26' (pen.); Soner Aydoğdu (yellow card) 35' (goal) 45+3'; Titi (yellow card) 90+1'	Report	17' Dever Orgill; (yellow card) 31' Gerson Rodrigues; (yellow card) 49' (goal) 58' (pen.) Daniel Łukasik; (yellow card) 61' Stelios Kitsiou; (yellow card) 90+6' Ante Kulušić	Stadium: Bornova Stadium; Attendance: 0 Referee: Fırat Aydınus; Assistant referees: Aleks Taşcıoğlu, Erdem Bayık; Fourth official: Caner Ak; Fifth official: Özgür Yankaya, Çağdaş Altay

11 July 2020 32	Göztepe	1 - 3	Gençlerbirliği	İzmir
21.00	Soner Aydoğdu (yellow card) 37'; Alpaslan Öztürk (yellow card) 78'; Alpaslan Öztürk 90+1'	Report	33' Giovanni Sio; 45+4' Bogdan Stancu; 75' (pen.) Stéphane Sessègnon; (yellow card) 77' Mats Seuntjens	Stadium: Bornova Stadium; Attendance: 0 Referee: Mete Kalkavan; Assistant referees: Ceyhun Sesigüzel, Kerem Ersoy; Fourth official: Sarper Barış Saka; Fifth official: Volkan Bayarslan, Bülent Birincioğlu

18 July 2020 33	Galatasaray	3 - 1	Göztepe	Istanbul
21.00		Report		Stadium: Türk Telekom Stadium; Attendance: 0 Referee: Koray Gençerler; Assistant referees: Volkan Ahmet Narinç, Samet Çiçek; Fourth official: Mustafa Kürşad Filiz

July 2020 34	Göztepe	3 - 1	Sivasspor	İzmir
		Report		Stadium: Bornova Stadium; Attendance: 0
