= 2023–24 Pendikspor season =

Pendikspor
2023–24 season
- Head coach: Ivo Vieira
- Stadium: Pendik Stadium
- Süper Lig: 19th (relegated)
- Turkish Cup: Fifth round
- Top goalscorer: League: Mame Thiam; Erencan Yardımcı (6 each); All: Mame Thiam; Erencan Yardımcı (6 each)
- Biggest win: İstanbulspor 2–4 Pendikspor; Pendikspor 5–3 Isparta 32
- Biggest defeat: Pendikspor 0–5 Fenerbahçe

The 2023–24 season is Pendikspor's 74th season in existence and first ever in the Süper Lig. They also competed in the Turkish Cup.

== Players ==
=== First-team squad ===
As of 9 February 2024

Note: Flags indicate national team as defined under FIFA eligibility rules; some limited exceptions apply. Players may hold more than one non-FIFA nationality.

No.	Pos.	Nation	Player
1	GK	GER	Erdem Canpolat
3	DF	TUR	Emre Taşdemir
5	MF	SEN	Badou Ndiaye
6	DF	POR	Nuno Sequeira
7	FW	SUR	Leandro Kappel
8	MF	ALB	Endri Çekiçi
11	FW	TUR	Halil Akbunar (on loan from Eyüpspor)
13	DF	TUR	Murat Akça
14	DF	SEN	Joher Rassoul
17	FW	TUR	Umut Nayir (on loan from Fenerbahçe)
18	MF	NOR	Fredrik Midtsjø
20	DF	TUR	Berkay Sülüngöz
21	FW	MLI	Abdoulay Diaby

No.	Pos.	Nation	Player
22	DF	TUR	Erdem Özgenç (captain)
23	DF	BRA	Welinton (3rd captain)
27	MF	SEN	Mame Thiam
33	DF	TUR	Alpaslan Öztürk
35	GK	TUR	Burak Öğür (vice-captain)
58	MF	DEN	Gökcan Kaya
61	DF	TUR	Serkan Asan (on loan from Trabzonspor)
66	MF	COD	Arnaud Lusamba (on loan from Alanyaspor)
70	FW	TUR	Melih Güney
76	GK	TUR	Murat Akşit
78	MF	TUR	Erdem Çalık
90	FW	NGR	Emeka Friday Eze
99	FW	TUR	Erencan Yardımcı (on loan from Eyüpspor)

=== Out on loan ===
Note: Flags indicate national team as defined under FIFA eligibility rules; some limited exceptions apply. Players may hold more than one non-FIFA nationality.

No.	Pos.	Nation	Player
—	DF	TUR	Furkan Mehmet Doğan (at Manisa until 30 June 2024)
—	DF	TUR	Umut Mert Toy (at Iğdır until 30 June 2024)
—	MF	TUR	Muhammed Akarslan (at Tuzlaspor until 30 June 2024)
—	MF	TUR	Bekir Karadeniz (at Manisa until 30 June 2024)
—	MF	TUR	Yunus Emre Kefeli (at Küçükçekmece Sinopspor until 30 June 2024)
—	MF	TUR	Enes Keskin (at Iğdır until 30 June 2024)
—	MF	TUR	Uygar Mert Zeybek (at Sarıyer until 30 June 2024)

No.	Pos.	Nation	Player
—	FW	TUR	Mertcan Akkaya (at Ergene Velimeşe until 30 June 2024)
—	FW	TUR	Samet Asatekin (at Tuzlaspor until 30 June 2024)
—	FW	TUR	Görkem Bitin (at Ankara Keçiörengücü until 30 June 2024)
—	FW	TUR	Muhammet Enes Erdem (at Çankaya until 30 June 2024)
—	FW	TUR	Ali Han Tunçer (at 1461 Trabzon FK until 30 June 2024)
—	FW	TUR	Mehmet Kaan Türkmen (at Çankaya until 30 June 2024)

== Transfers ==
=== In ===
Pos.	Player	Transferred from	Fee	Date	Source
MF	(Paraguay) Óscar Romero	(Argentina) Boca Juniors	Free	8 August 2023	
MF	(Albania) Endri Çekiçi	(Turkey) Konyaspor	Free	17 August 2023	
MF	(Norway) Fredrik Midtsjø	(Turkey) Galatasaray	€3,000,000	7 September 2023	
FW	(Egypt) Ahmed Hassan	(Greece) Olympiacos	Free	15 September 2023	
FW	(Senegal) Mame Thiam	(Turkey) Kayserispor	€1,700,000	12 January 2024	

=== Out ===
Pos.	Player	Transferred to	Fee	Date	Source
MF	(Paraguay) Óscar Romero	Released		30 January 2024	
FW	(Egypt) Ahmed Hassan	(Turkey) Alanyaspor	Undisclosed	9 February 2024	

== Pre-season and friendlies ==
Win Draw Loss Fixtures

20 July 2023 Friendly	Pendikspor (Turkey)	0–0	(Turkey) Çorum FK

== Competitions ==
=== Overall record ===
Competition	First match	Last match	Starting round	Final position	Record							
Competition	First match	Last match	Starting round	Final position	Pld	W	D	L	GF	GA	GD	Win %
Süper Lig	August 2023	26 May 2024	Matchday 1		37	9	10	18	42	72	−30	24.32
Turkish Cup	5 December 2023	17 January 2024	Fourth round	Fifth round	2	1	0	1	6	5	+1	50.00
Total					39	10	10	19	48	77	−29	25.64

Last updated: 18 May 2024
Source: Soccerway

=== Süper Lig ===
==== League table ====
Pos	Team	Pld	W	D	L	GF	GA	GD	Pts	Qualification or relegation
16	Konyaspor	38	9	14	15	40	53	−13	41 (Note: Hatayspor are ahead of Konyaspor on overall goal difference.)	
17	Ankaragücü (R)	38	8	16	14	46	52	−6	40 (Note: Ankaragücü are ahead of Fatih Karagümrük on head-to-head points: Fatih Karagümrük 1–1 Ankaragücü, Ankaragücü 2–0 Fatih Karagümrük.)	Relegation to TFF First League
18	Fatih Karagümrük (R)	38	10	10	18	49	52	−3	40	Relegation to TFF First League
19	Pendikspor (R)	38	9	10	19	42	73	−31	37	Relegation to TFF First League
20	İstanbulspor (Note: 3 points deducted) (R)	38	4	7	27	27	80	−53	16	Relegation to TFF First League

Source: Süper Lig
Rules for classification: 1) Points; 2) Head-to-head points; 3) Head-to-head goal difference; 4) Head-to-head goals scored; 5) Goal difference; 6) Goals scored; 7) Play-off.
(R) Relegated

==== Results summary ====
Overall								Home						Away					
Pld	W	D	L	GF	GA	GD	Pts	W	D	L	GF	GA	GD	W	D	L	GF	GA	GD
37	9	10	18	42	72	−30	37	6	3	9	22	32	−10	3	7	9	20	40	−20

Last updated: 18 May 2024.
Source: Trendyol Süper Lig

==== Results by round ====
Round	1	2	3	4	5	6	7	8	9	10	11	12	13	14	15	16	17	18	19	20	21	22	23	24	25	26	27	28	29	30	31	32	33	34	35	36	37	38
Ground	H	A	A	H	A	H	A	H	A	H	A	H	A	H	A	H	A	H	A	A	H	H	A	H	A	H	A	H	A	H	A	H	A	H	A	H	A	H
Result	L	D	D	D	L	D	L	L	W	L	W	W	L	L	L	L	L	D	D	D	W	W	D	W	L	L	L	L	L	W	D	L	L	L	W	W	D	
Position	20	18	17	16	17	17	18	19	18	18	17	15	16	16	19	19	19	19	19	19	19	17	18	16	18	18	19	19	19	19	19	19	19	19	19	19	19	

Updated to match(es) played on 18 May 2024. Source: Trendyol Süper Lig
A = Away; H = Home; W = Win; D = Draw; L = Loss

==== Matches ====
The league fixtures were unveiled on 18 July 2023.

12 August 2023 1	Pendikspor	1–5	Hatayspor	Istanbul
21:45 UTC+3	Thuram 90+3'	Report	Strandberg 3'; Sağlam (yellow card) 19', (goal) 23'; Yıldırım 46'; Dele-Bashiru 57', 85'	Stadium: Ümraniye Municipality City Stadium; Attendance: 1,269; Referee: Çağdaş Altay

20 August 2023 2	Beşiktaş	1–1	Pendikspor	Beşiktaş
21:45 TRT (UTC+3)	Colley 12'; Rashica (yellow card) 81'; Günok (yellow card) 90+8'; Bulut (yellow card) 90+9'; Rebić (yellow card) 90+12'	Report	Asan (yellow card) 11'; Öğür (yellow card) 90+1'; Özgenç (yellow card) 90+1'; Romero 90+4' (pen.); Vuković (yellow card) 90+9'	Stadium: Beşiktaş Stadium; Attendance: 27,130; Referee: Kadir Sağlam

26 August 2023 3	Kasımpaşa	1–1	Pendikspor	Istanbul
19:15 TRT (UTC+3)		Report		Stadium: Recep Tayyip Erdoğan Stadium; Referee: Yaşar Kemal Uğurlu

2 September 2023 4	Pendikspor	1–1	Alanyaspor	Pendik
19:15				Stadium: Pendik Stadium

16 September 2023 5	Adana Demirspor	3–0	Pendikspor	Adana
20:00 TRT (UTC+3)	Niang 15', 41'; Akbaba 88'	Report	Rassoul (yellow card) 45+4'; Vuković (yellow card) 82'; Romero (yellow card) 90+5'	Stadium: New Adana Stadium; Attendance: 7,932; Referee: Mert Güzenge

23 September 2023 6	Pendikspor	1–1	Fatih Karagümrük	Pendik
17:00				Stadium: Pendik Stadium

30 September 2023 7	Trabzonspor	2–1	Pendikspor	Trabzon
16:00 TRT (UTC+3)

7 October 2023 8	Pendikspor	2–3	Sivasspor	Pendik
13:30				Stadium: Pendik Stadium; Referee: Turgut Doman

21 October 2023 9	Konyaspor	1–2	Pendikspor

29 October 2023 10	Pendikspor	0–5	Fenerbahçe	Pendik
19:00				Stadium: Pendik Stadium

4 November 2023 11	İstanbulspor	2–4	Pendikspor	Istanbul
13:30				Stadium: Esenyurt Necmi Kadıoğlu Stadium

12 November 2023 12	Pendikspor	1–0	Samsunspor	Pendik
13:30				Stadium: Pendik Stadium

27 November 2023 13	İstanbul Başakşehir	4–1	Pendikspor	Istanbul
20:00				Stadium: Başakşehir Fatih Terim Stadium

2 December 2023 14	Pendikspor	0–2	Galatasaray	Pendik
19:00				Stadium: Pendik Stadium

10 December 2023 15	Kayserispor	2–0	Pendikspor	Kayseri
16:00				Stadium: Kadir Has Stadium

21 December 2023 17	Çaykur Rizespor	5–1	Pendikspor	Rize

25 December 2023 18	Pendikspor	1–1	Ankaragücü	Pendik
				Stadium: Pendik Stadium

5 January 2024 19	Gaziantep	2–2	Pendikspor	Gaziantep

9 January 2024 16	Pendikspor	0–1	Antalyaspor	Pendik
				Stadium: Pendik Stadium

13 January 2024 20	Hatayspor	1–1	Pendikspor	Mersin

20 January 2024 21	Pendikspor	4–0	Beşiktaş	Pendik
				Stadium: Pendik Stadium

23 January 2024 22	Pendikspor	3–2	Kasımpaşa	Pendik
				Stadium: Pendik Stadium

27 January 2024 23	Alanyaspor	1–1	Pendikspor	Alanya

4 February 2024 24	Pendikspor	2–1	Adana Demirspor	Istanbul
13:30 TRT (UTC+3)	Diaby 11'; Nayir 22', (yellow card) 90+1'; Akbunar (yellow card) 43' (yellow-red card) 72'; Rassoul (yellow card) 66'		Michut (yellow card) 70'; Nani 90+10'	Stadium: Siltaş Yapı Pendik Stadyumu; Referee: Direnç Tonusluoğlu

10 February 2024 25	Fatih Karagümrük	2–0	Pendikspor	Istanbul
16:00 TRT (UTC+3)	Mor 31'; Ceccherini (yellow card) 59'; Yalçın 76'			Stadium: Atatürk Olympic Stadium; Referee: Zorbay Küçük

18 February 2024 26	Pendikspor	0–2	Trabzonspor	Istanbul
16:00 TRT (UTC+3)			Trézéguet 75'; Destan 80'	Stadium: Siltaş Yapı Pendik Stadyumu; Referee: Halil Umut Meler

25 February 2024 27	Sivasspor	4–1	Pendikspor	Sivas
13:30 TRT (UTC+3)				Stadium: New Sivas 4 Eylül Stadium

3 March 2024 28	Pendikspor	0–2	Konyaspor	Pendik
				Stadium: Pendik Stadium

10 March 2024 29	Fenerbahçe	4–1	Pendikspor	Istanbul
				Stadium: Şükrü Saracoğlu Stadium

15 March 2024 30	Pendikspor	1–0	İstanbulspor	Pendik
				Stadium: Pendik Stadium

4 April 2024 31	Samsunspor	0–0	Pendikspor	Samsun
				Stadium: Samsun 19 Mayıs Stadium

14 April 2024 32	Pendikspor	2–3	İstanbul Başakşehir	Pendik
				Stadium: Pendik Stadium

21 April 2024 33	Galatasaray	4–1	Pendikspor	Istanbul

28 April 2024 34	Pendikspor	1–2	Kayserispor	Pendik
				Stadium: Pendik Stadium

6 May 2024 35	Antalyaspor	1–2	Pendikspor	Antalya
20:00	Buksa 13' (pen.); Van de Streek (red card) 74'		Thiam 15'; Akbunar 45+6'	Stadium: Corendon Airlines Park; Referee: Tugay Kaan Numanoğlu

12 May 2024 36	Pendikspor	2–1	Çaykur Rizespor	Pendik
19:00	Thiam (penalty missed) 45+7', 65'; Nayir 74'		Shelvey 44'	Stadium: Pendik Stadium; Referee: Atilla Karaoğlan

18 May 2024 37	Ankaragücü	0–0	Pendikspor	Ankara
19:00				Stadium: Eryaman Stadium; Referee: Volkan Bayarslan

26 May 2024 38	Pendikspor	v	Gaziantep	Pendik
19:00				Stadium: Pendik Stadium

=== Turkish Cup ===
5 December 2023 Fourth round	Pendikspor	5–3	Isparta 32	Pendik
15:00	Thuram 16'; Romero 29'; Hassan 54', 61', 63'		Çoban 35'; Harlak 74'; Küçükdurmuş 84'	Stadium: Pendik Stadium; Referee: Adnan Deniz Kayatepe

17 January 2024 Fifth round	Antalyaspor	2–1	Pendikspor	Antalya
13:00	Akyol 49'; Van de Streek 558'		Nayir 33'	Stadium: Corendon Airlines Park; Referee: Mehmet Türkmen
