= La Castellane =

Neighbourhood in the 16th arrondissement of Marseille, France

- Neighbourhood
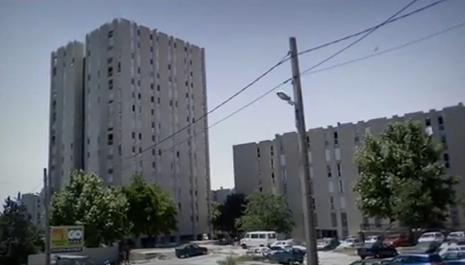
- Residential buildings in La Castellane

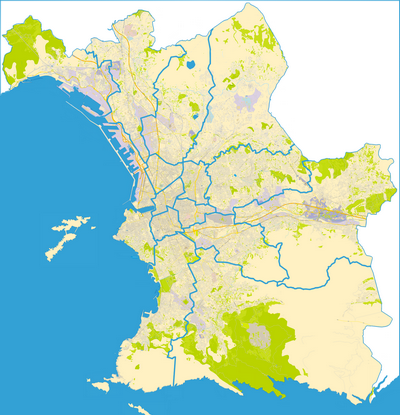
- Location in Marseille La Castellane (France)
- Coordinates: 43.367°N 5.342°E
- Country: France
- Region: Provence-Alpes-Côte d'Azur
- Department: Bouches-du-Rhône
- City: Marseilla

La Castellane is a neighbourhood in the 16th arrondissement of Marseille, France. Built as a Modernist council estate in the 1960s for French refugees of the Algerian War of 1954–1962, it is now home to about 7,000 residents, many of whom are second-generation French citizens. The neighbourhood is plagued by unemployment, drug trafficking, prostitution, and arms smuggling. It is also known for being the neighbourhood where the footballer Zinedine Zidane grew up.

== Location ==
La Castellane is located in the Verduron district in the northwestern edge of Marseille, the second largest city in France after its capital Paris. It is just off the A55 autoroute.

== History ==
The neighbourhood was built on the grounds of the ancient marquisate of Foresta. The idea of building tall, modern buildings was first broached in 1955. They were designed by architect Pierre Meillassoux, who was inspired by master architect Xavier Arsène-Henry and, to a certain extent, Oscar Niemeyer. The housing complex, completed in the 1960s, consists of eleven buildings containing 1,249 apartments. As of 2015, the buildings are said to be run-down.

The neighbourhood first served as a council estate for refugees of the Algerian War of 1954–1962, as a result of the loss of French Algeria during the presidency of General Charles de Gaulle. Shortly after, immigrants from Morocco moved to La Castellane, followed by others from Sub-Saharan Africa and the Caribbeans. It is now home to about 7,000 residents, many of whom are second-generation French citizens. For example, it is the hometown of football player Zinedine Zidane, whose parents were born in Algeria. Lamine Gassama, another football player who grew up in La Castellane, was born to parents from Senegal. As in many other underserved French banlieues, young people from La Castellane are "condemned to excellence" to achieve success and recognition in mainstream society, often through football.

In the first round of the 2017 presidential election, the 15th arrondissement voted 27% for Marine Le Pen, the Front National candidate. This support for far right political organizations in the neighborhoods nearby La Castellane reflects the tensions between ethnically European and immigrant populations living in Marseille and throughout France. Part of a national phenomenon, the lack of integration of immigrants into mainstream French society has led to many living in La Castellane to not identify themselves as French. The social divisions between banlieues like La Castellane and mainstream France are also clear from anti-immigrant rhetoric in local and national politics, which purports that people from the banlieues are not truly French.

The neighbourhood is plagued by unemployment, drug trafficking, prostitution and arms smuggling. There are three drug-trafficking networks: "place du Mérou", "Tour K", and "La Jougardelle". French newspapers have suggested the neighbourhood is known as a "supermarket" for illegal drugs.

In June 2013, French police took down a drug-trafficking syndicate, including 1.3 million euros in cash split between several smugglers, weapons and drugs. In December 2014, a state school was burnt down in La Castellane. A month later, in January 2015, a young man was gunned down, as was another young man in 2011.

On 9 February 2015, shortly after gunfire at a police car during the 2015 Marseille shooting, the National Gendarmerie Intervention Group seized seven Kalashnikov rifles, two .357 Magnum revolvers and around 20 kilograms of drugs; however, the gunmen were not aiming at the police; instead, it was the result of a turf war between two gangs, selling primarily cannabis and cocaine. Drug-traffickers as a whole in La Castellane were reported in 2015 to make between 50,000 and 60,000 euros a day. Shortly after the February incident, French Prime Minister Manuel Valls, who was visiting Marseille, called it an example of "apartheid", whereby French citizens who live in such neighbourhoods feel excluded from society.

On June 15, 2015, French police arrested 33 suspected drug traffickers, including Socialist Senator Samia Ghali's chauffeur, as well as weapons and several kilograms of cannabis. Bernard Cazeneuve, the French Interior Minister, suggested drug-trafficking was used to fund terrorism on French soil, and reiterated his commitment to restore order.

In April 2016, some buildings were scheduled to be demolished in an effort to put an end to drug-trafficking.

Buildings C, E, and F of La Castellane (15th and 16th districts) will be demolished following the demolition of the iconic 45-meter-tall Tower K; ultimately, 702 housing units are set to be demolished and another 900 renovated.
