= Meillassoux =

Meillassoux is a surname, and may refer to:

- Claude Meillassoux (1925–2005), French anthropologist
- Pierre Meillassoux (born 1928), French architect
- Quentin Meillassoux (born 1967), French philosopher
