= Hôtel de Ville, Orléans =

Town hall in Orléans, France

Hôtel de Ville
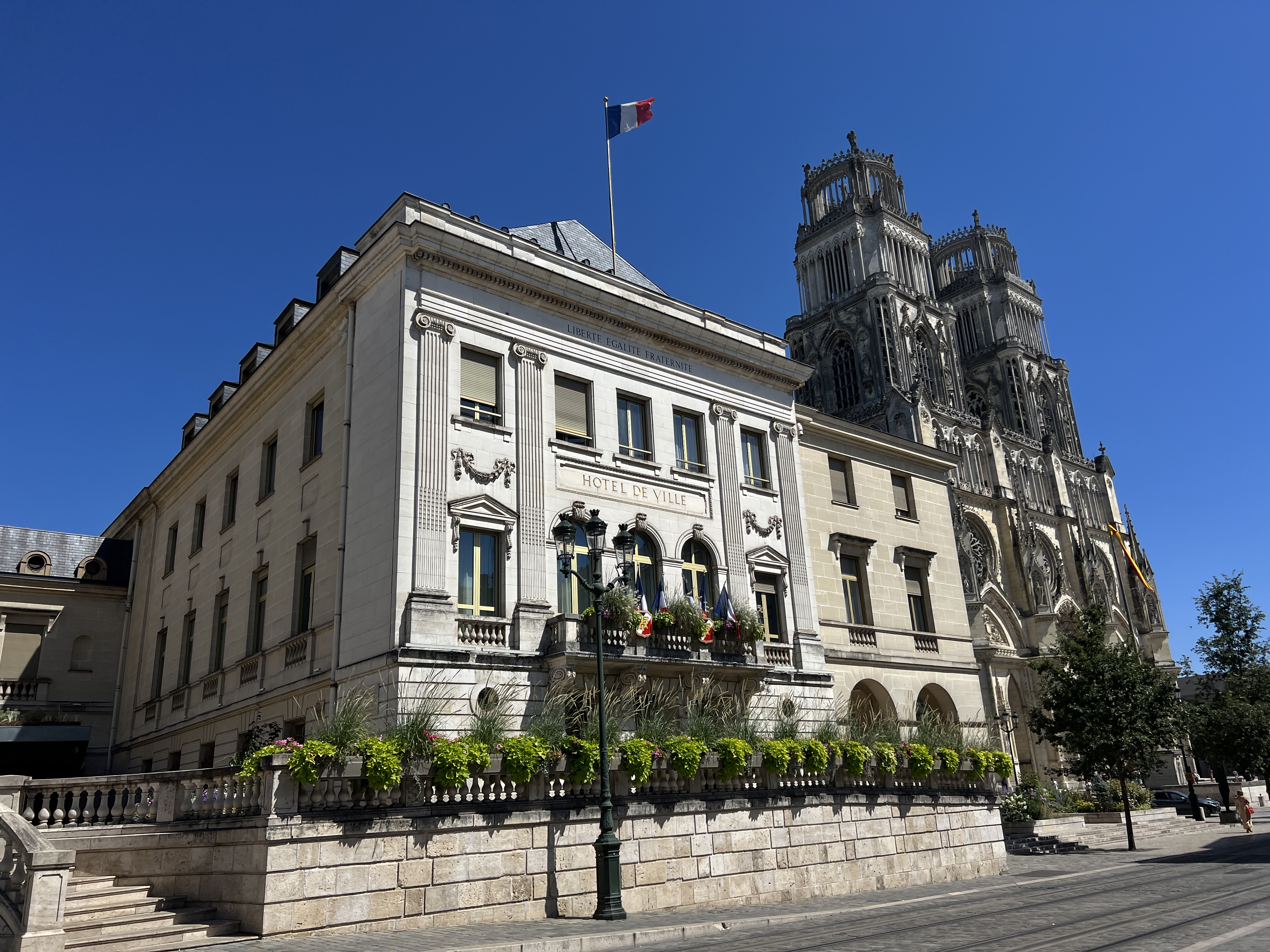
- The main frontage of the Hôtel de Ville in July 2022
- Interactive map of the Hôtel de Ville area

General information
- Type: City hall
- Architectural style: Neoclassical style
- Location: Orléans, France
- Coordinates: 47.9026°N 1.9090°E
- Completed: 1981

Design and construction
- Architect: Xavier Arsène-Henry

The Hôtel de Ville (French pronunciation: [otɛl də vil], City Hall), also known as the Centre Municipal, is a municipal building in Orléans, Loiret, north-central France, standing on the Place de l'Etape.

== History ==
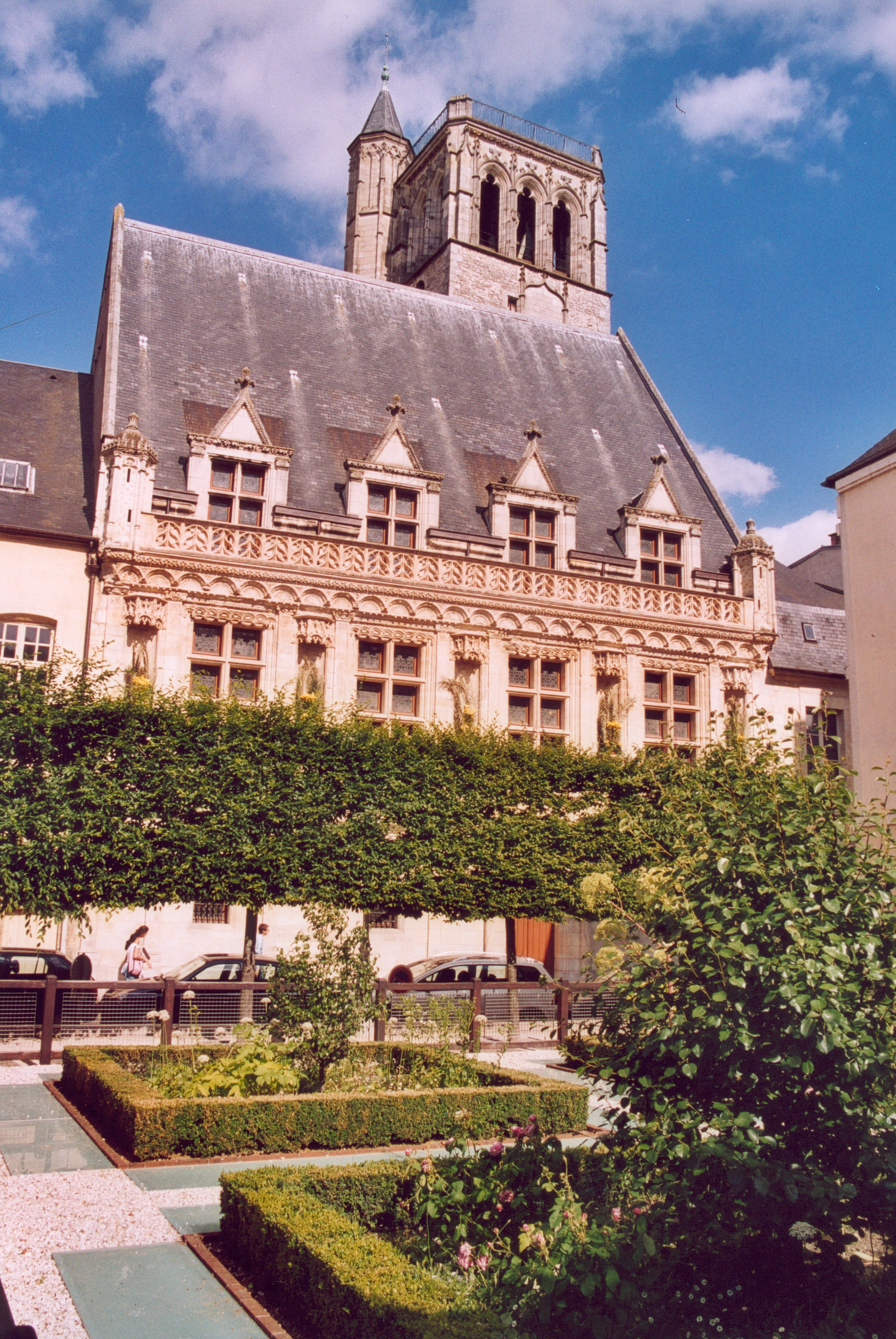
Hôtel des Créneaux

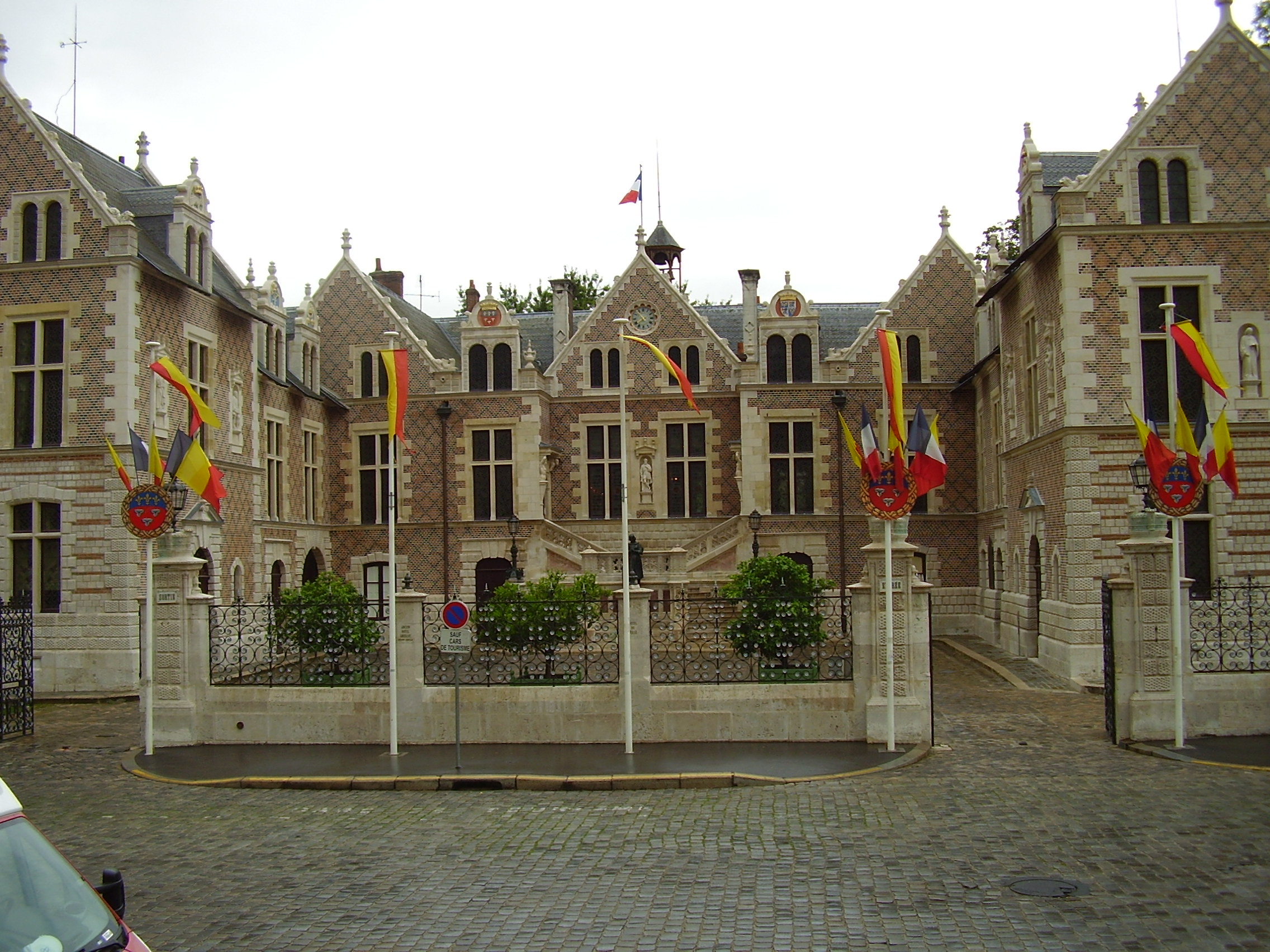
Hôtel Groslot

Early meetings of the local council were held in Saint-Samson tower at the Châtelet, which dated back to the 12th century and was located at the north end of the bridge across the River Loire. The council then sought a dedicated town hall and selected the Hôtel des Créneaux on Rue Sainte-Catherine: it had been built in the late 13th century; the council rented it from about 1400 and erected a tall belfry in the 1440s.

In the early 18th century, the council decided that it needed a more substantial building and identified the Hôtel Groslot on the west side of Rue Théophile Chollot: it had been commissioned by the local bailiff, Jacques Groslot, designed by Jacques I Androuet du Cerceau in the Renaissance style and was completed in 1558. It was acquired by the council in 1738, and after accommodating various council officials, it became the town hall in 1790. A major refurbishment was carried out in the mid-19th century and the building re-opened again in May 1855.

In the early 1970s, the council decided to commission modern premises. The site they selected, on the opposite side of Rue Théophile Chollot, was occupied by the Opera House which was duly demolished in July 1974. Originally, it had been proposed to create a tunnel between the Hôtel Groslot and the new building, but this concept was abandoned. The new building was designed by Xavier Arsène-Henry in the neoclassical style, built in ashlar stone and was officially opened on 15 December 1981.

The layout involved three blocks laid out round a courtyard. The public entrance was at the right-hand corner of the courtyard but the civic rooms were in the south block, which featured a symmetrical main frontage of five bays facing onto Rue Théophile Chollot. The central section of three bays incorporated three recessed openings on the ground floor, three round headed windows with moulded surrounds and keystones on the first floor, and three casement windows with window cills on the second floor. The outer bays were fenestrated with oculi on the ground floor, pedimented casement windows on the first floor and casement windows with window cills on the second floor. The outer bays were flanked by Ionic order pilasters supporting an entablature and a modillioned cornice. Internally, the principal rooms include the new council chamber, as well as reception rooms suitable for trade delegations.

A plaque to commemorate the 40th anniversary of the liberation of the city by the 137th Infantry Regiment, part of the 3rd United States Army, under Lieutenant General George S. Patton, during the Second World War, was unveiled outside the building on 16 August 1984.
