= André Biyogo Poko =

Gabonese footballer (born 1993)

André Poko
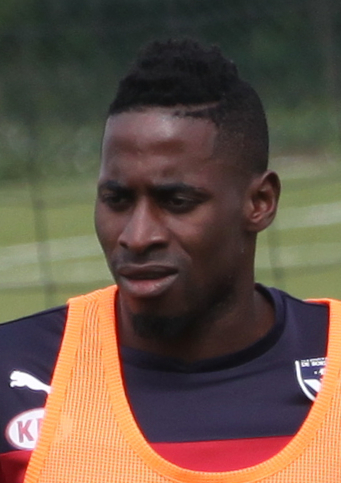
- Poko training with Bordeaux in 2015

Personal information
- Full name: André Ivan Biyogo Poko
- Date of birth: 1 January 1993 (age 33)
- Place of birth: Bitam, Gabon
- Height: 1.73 m (5 ft 8 in)
- Position: Midfielder

Team information
- Current team: Sariyer
- Number: 53

Youth career
- US Bitam

Senior career*
Years	Team	Apps	(Gls)
2009–2011	US Bitam		
2011–2014	Bordeaux B	17	(0)
2011–2016	Bordeaux	73	(1)
2016–2018	Karabükspor	43	(0)
2018–2020	Göztepe	57	(2)
2021–2022	Altay	36	(2)
2022–2023	Al-Khaleej	29	(2)
2023–2024	Hapoel Be'er Sheva	26	(0)
2024	Istra 1961	7	(0)
2025–2026	Amedspor	25	(3)
2026	→ Sariyer (loan)	14	(4)
2026–	Sariyer	8	(0)

International career^{‡}
2010–	Gabon	91	(4)
- * Club domestic league appearances and goals as of 21 September 2026 ‡ National team caps and goals as of 29 September 2026

André Ivan Biyogo Poko (born 7 March 1993) is a Gabonese professional footballer who plays as a midfielder for TFF First League club Sariyer and for the Gabon national team. He was part of the Gabon national team in the 2021 AFCON tournament in Cameroon.

== Career ==
On 31 August 2011, Biyogo Poko joined the French Ligue 1 outfit Bordeaux on a three-year contract.

On 28 July 2022, Poko joined Saudi Professional League club Al-Khaleej on a one-year contract.

He represented his country at the 2012 African Cup of Nations, during which Gabon, as hosts of the competition, reached the quarter-finals.

== Career statistics ==
=== Club ===
As of match played 19 September 2026

Appearances and goals by club, season and competition
Club	Season	League			National cup		League cup		Europe		Other		Total	
Club	Season	Division	Apps	Goals	Apps	Goals	Apps	Goals	Apps	Goals	Apps	Goals	Apps	Goals
Bordeaux B	2011–12	CFA 2	9	0	—		—		—		—		9	0
Bordeaux B	2012–13	CFA 2	7	0	—		—		—		—		7	0
Bordeaux B	2014–15	CFA 2	1	0	—		—		—		—		1	0
Bordeaux B	Total		17	0	—		—		—		—		17	0
Bordeaux	2012–13	Ligue 1	14	1	4	0	—		4 (Note: Appearances in UEFA Europa League)	0	—		22	1
Bordeaux	2013–14	Ligue 1	18	0	1	0	1	1	—		—		20	1
Bordeaux	2014–15	Ligue 1	16	0	1	0	0	0	—		—		17	0
Bordeaux	2015–16	Ligue 1	25	0	1	1	3	0	10	1	—		39	4
Bordeaux	Total		73	1	7	1	4	0	14	1	—		98	3
Karabükspor	2016–17	Süper Lig	28	0	—		—		—		—		28	0
Karabükspor	2017–18	Süper Lig	15	0	—		—		—		—		15	0
Karabükspor	Total		43	0	—		—		—		—		43	0
Göztepe	2017–18	Süper Lig	14	1	—		—		—		—		14	1
Göztepe	2018–19	Süper Lig	27	1	5	0	—		—		—		32	1
Göztepe	2019–20	Süper Lig	14	0	0	0	—		—		—		14	0
Göztepe	2020–21	Süper Lig	2	0	0	0	—		—		—		2	0
Göztepe	Total		57	2	5	0	—		—		—		62	2
Altay	2020–21	TFF 1. Lig	6	0	—		—		—		—		6	0
Altay	2021–22	Süper Lig	30	2	—		—		—		—		30	2
Altay	Total		36	2	—		—		—		—		36	2
Al-Khaleej	2022–23	Saudi Pro League	29	2	1	0	—		—		—		30	2
Hapoel Be'er Sheva	2023–24	Israeli Premier League	26	0	5	0	—		—		—		31	0
Istra 1961	2024–25	Croatian Football League	7	0	1	0	—		—		—		8	0
Amedspor	2024–25	TFF 1. Lig	10	1	—		—		—		—		10	1
Amedspor	2025–26	TFF 1. Lig	15	3	—		—		—		—		15	3
Amedspor	Total		25	4	—		—		—		—		25	4
Sarıyerspor (loan)	2025–26	TFF 1. Lig	14	4	—		—		—		14	4		
Sarıyerspor	2026–27	TFF 1. Lig	8	0	—		—		—		8	0		
Career total			335	15	19	1	4	1	14	1	0	0	372	18

=== International ===
As of match played 29 September 2026

Appearances and goals by national team and year
National team	Year	Apps	Goals
Gabon	2010	5	0
Gabon	2011	6	0
Gabon	2012	9	1
Gabon	2013	3	0
Gabon	2014	5	0
Gabon	2015	12	0
Gabon	2016	6	0
Gabon	2017	5	0
Gabon	2018	7	1
Gabon	2019	3	0
Gabon	2020	2	0
Gabon	2021	6	1
Gabon	2022	9	0
Gabon	2023	1	0
Gabon	2025	10	1
Gabon	2026	2	0
Total		91	4

Scores and results list Gabon's goal tally first, score column indicates score after each Biyogo Poko goal.

List of international goals scored by André Biyogo Poko
No.	Date	Venue	Opponent	Score	Result	Competition
1	14 November 2012	Stade Omar Bongo, Libreville, Gabon	Portugal	2–2	2–2	Friendly
2	16 October 2018	Juba Stadium, Juba, South Sudan	South Sudan	1–0	1–0	2019 Africa Cup of Nations qualification
3	1 September 2021	Benina Martyrs Stadium, Benghazi, Libya	Libya	1–0	1–2	2022 FIFA World Cup qualification
4	6 June 2025	Stade Général Seyni Kountché, Niamey, Niger	Niger	2–4	3–4	Friendly

== Honours ==
Bordeaux

- Coupe de France: 2012–13
