= Pierre Meillassoux =

French architect (born 1928)

- Born: 1928; Perreux, France
- Died: 2001
- Occupation: Architect

Pierre Meillassoux (/ˌmeɪəˈsuː/; French: [mɛjasu]; 5 May 1928 – 20 November 2001) was a French architect. He designed many high-rise social buildings in Marseille.

== Early life ==
Pierre Meillassoux was born in 1928 in Le Perreux-sur-Marne. He received a degree in Architecture in 1957. He became the "first assistant" of star architect Fernand Pouillon.

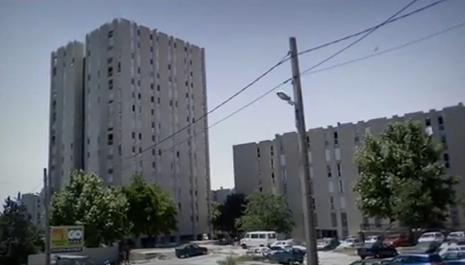
La Castellane in Marseille, high-rise social buildings designed by Meillassoux.

== Career ==
He designed many high-rise buildings in Marseille. He designed La Castellane in the 1960s. For this, he was inspired by master architect Xavier Arsène-Henry and, to a certain extent, Oscar Niemeyer. Moreover, he designed the Parc des Amandiers in the 12th arrondissement in 1961; the Nouveau Parc Verdillon in the 10th arrondissement in 1965; Clair Soleil in the 11th arrondissement in 1966; the Résidence les Borels in the 15th arrondissement in 1969.

He went on to design more high-rise buildings in the 1970s. He designed L'Emérigone in the 13th arrondissement in 1970; Château Saint-Jacques in the 11th arrondissement in 1971; Beausite in the 13th arrondissement in 1972. With architects Pierre Mathoulin and Jean Rozan, he designed La Bricarde in the 15th arrondissement in 1973. A year later, in 1974, he designed Les Escourtines in the 11th arrondissement, also with Mathoulin. That same year, he designed Le Bosquet in the 11th arrondissement. Two years later, in 1976, he designed Baille Marengo in the 6th arrondissement.

His plans to design high-rise buildings with Pierre Pascalet on Port-Cros and Porquerolles were rejected by other architects, including state official urbanist Serge Antoine.
