= Alpaslan Öztürk =

Footballer (born 1993)

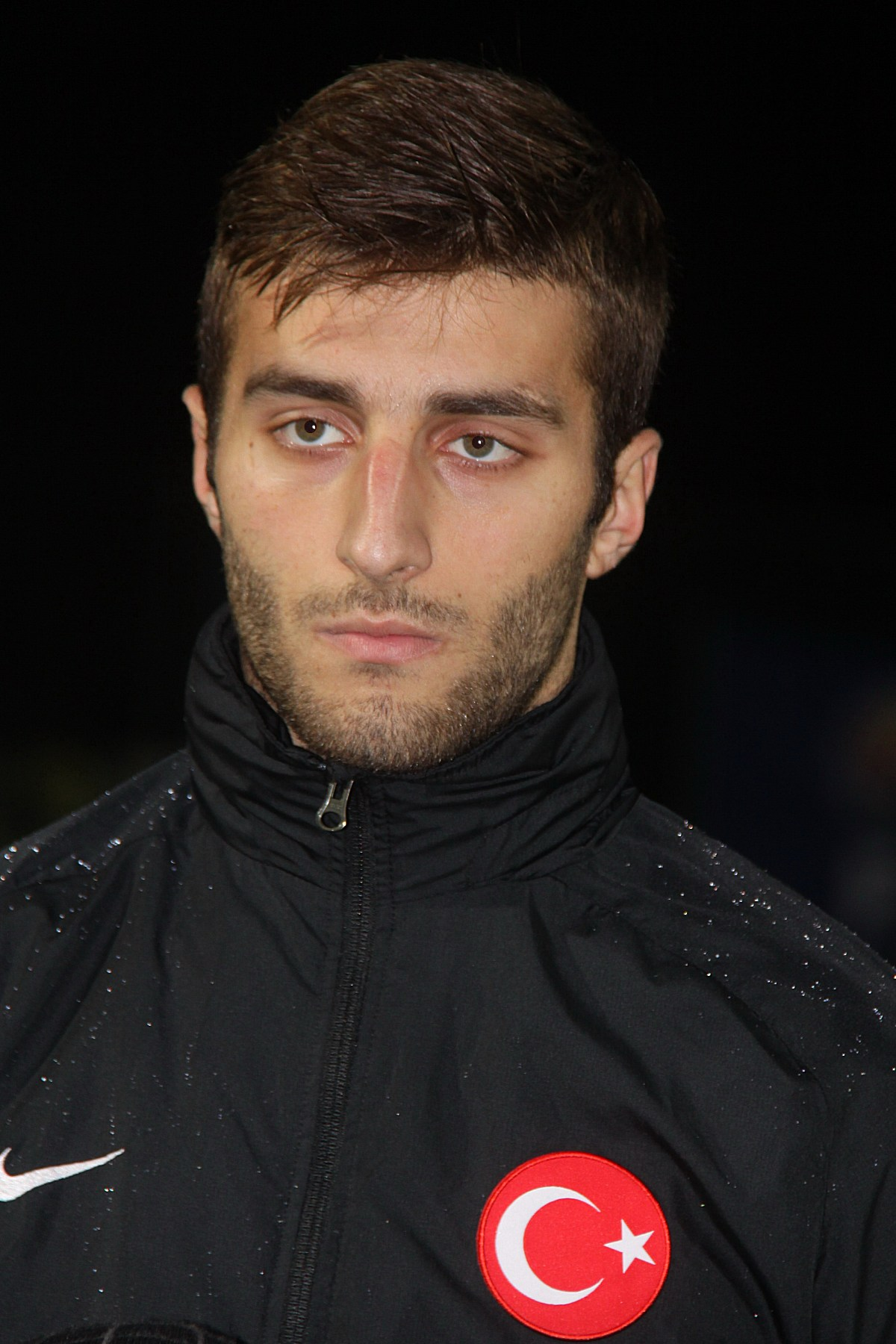
- Öztürk with Turkey U21 in 2013

Personal information
- Full name: Alpaslan Öztürk
- Date of birth: 16 July 1993 (age 33)
- Place of birth: Antwerp, Belgium
- Height: 1.86 m (6 ft 1 in)
- Positions: Defender; right back; midfielder

Team information
- Current team: Kahramanmaraş İstiklalspor
- Number: 5

Youth career
- Berchem Sport
- Germinal Beerschot
- 2009–2011: Birmingham City

Senior career*
Years	Team	Apps	(Gls)
2011–2013	Beerschot	41	(1)
2013–2017	Standard Liège	11	(0)
2014–2015	→ Kasımpaşa (loan)	33	(0)
2015–2016	→ Eskişehirspor (loan)	15	(0)
2017–2018	Elazığspor	32	(8)
2018–2021	Göztepe	64	(12)
2021–2023	Galatasaray	11	(0)
2022–2023	→ Eyüpspor (loan)	15	(1)
2023–2025	Pendikspor	39	(3)
2025–	Kahramanmaraş İstiklalspor	4	(0)

International career^{‡}
2010	Turkey U18	2	(0)
2010–2011	Belgium U18	7	(0)
2011–2012	Belgium U19	11	(1)
2012	Belgium U21	5	(1)
2013	Turkey U20	7	(1)
2013–2014	Turkey U21	5	(0)
2014	Turkey B	1	(0)
2021–	Turkey	1	(0)
- * Club domestic league appearances and goals as of 19 October 2025 ‡ National team caps and goals as of 18:24, 1 September 2021 (UTC)

Alpaslan Öztürk (born 16 July 1993) is a professional footballer who plays as a right-back and midfielder for TFF 2. Lig club Kahramanmaraş İstiklalspor and the Turkey national team.

Öztürk began his club career with Beerschot before joining English club Birmingham City, where he spent two years without appearing for the first team. He then returned to Beerschot, making his first-team debut in January 2012. After the club's 2013 relegation from the Pro League and subsequent bankruptcy left all their players out of contract, Öztürk signed for Standard Liège. He was loaned to Turkish Süper Lig club Kasımpaşa for one-and-a-half seasons before spending 2015–16 on loan at another Turkish club, Eskişehirspor. Following a short spell at Elazığspor, he signed for Göztepe in 2018.

Born in Belgium, he has represented Turkey, the country of his parents, at under-18, under-20, under-21, and A2 level, and Belgium, the country of his birth, at under-18, under-19, and under-21 level.

== Club career ==
=== Early life and career ===
Öztürk was born in Antwerp, Belgium, and is of Turkish descent. He was part of the youth system at Berchem Sport before joining Germinal Beerschot at the age of 12, and then moved to England to join Birmingham City's Youth Academy in 2009. He played regularly in the under-18 and reserve teams, and in March 2011, was given a first-team squad number prior to the FA Cup sixth-round tie against Bolton Wanderers. In the absence through injury of Stephen Carr and Roger Johnson, and with Liam Ridgewell not fit enough to start, Öztürk was named among the substitutes for that game, but remained unused.

He was part of the Birmingham squad for their 2011 pre-season visit to Ireland, and played the second half of the friendly against Cork City. In August 2011, he left the club. It was reported that no agreement could be reached between Birmingham and Beerschot on a mutually acceptable way to structure a compensation fee.

=== Beerschot ===
Öztürk returned to Beerschot for the 2011–12 season. Playing as a midfielder rather than the right back position he usually occupied at Birmingham, he was an unused substitute for the first team's visit to Standard Liège in January 2012, made his debut as Beerschot beat K.V. Kortrijk in the Belgian Cup, and played the full 90 minutes on his first Belgian Pro League appearance as Beerschot beat Cercle Brugge 4–0 on 21 January. In February, his contract was extended to June 2016. Beerschot were relegated from the Pro League at the end of the 2012–13 season, and the club was subsequently declared bankrupt, which left the players out of contract.

=== Standard Liège ===
As a free agent, Öztürk signed a five-year contract with Standard Liège on 13 June 2013. He made his Standard debut in the starting eleven against Lierse on 4 August, producing a calm, assured performance in his preferred position of defensive midfield. Öztürk kept his place, and contributed to Standard's qualification for the Europa League group stages.

=== Kasımpaşa ===
Öztürk spent the second half of the 2013–14 season on loan to Turkish Süper Lig club Kasımpaşa. He started one match, a goalless draw away to Kayserispor, and made nine substitute appearances. In July, he rejoined Kasımpaşa, again on loan, for the 2014–15 season; the agreement included an option to make the transfer permanent. He appeared in 23 Süper Lig matches that season, but the move was not made permanent.

=== Eskişehirspor ===
He joined another Süper Lig club, Eskişehirspor, on loan for the 2015–16 season; again, the deal included an option to purchase. After making 15 league appearances, he was dropped from the squad in early March 2016 and never played again. In an interview with a Turkish website, Öztürk said he was training on his own and, with the club in financial difficulties, the players were not receiving their wages regularly. He made it clear that he wanted to return to Standard, and even if Eskişehirspor took up their option, he had no interest in staying.

=== Return to Standard ===
Ahead of the 2016–17 season, Öztürk took part in pre-season training with Standard.

=== Galatasaray ===
He signed a three-year contract with Galatasaray in the 2021–22 season.

=== Eyüpspor (loan) ===
He signed a one-year lease agreement with Eyüpspor on 30 June 2022.

=== Pendikspor ===
On August 29, 2023, he signed with Süper Lig club Pendikspor.

== International career ==
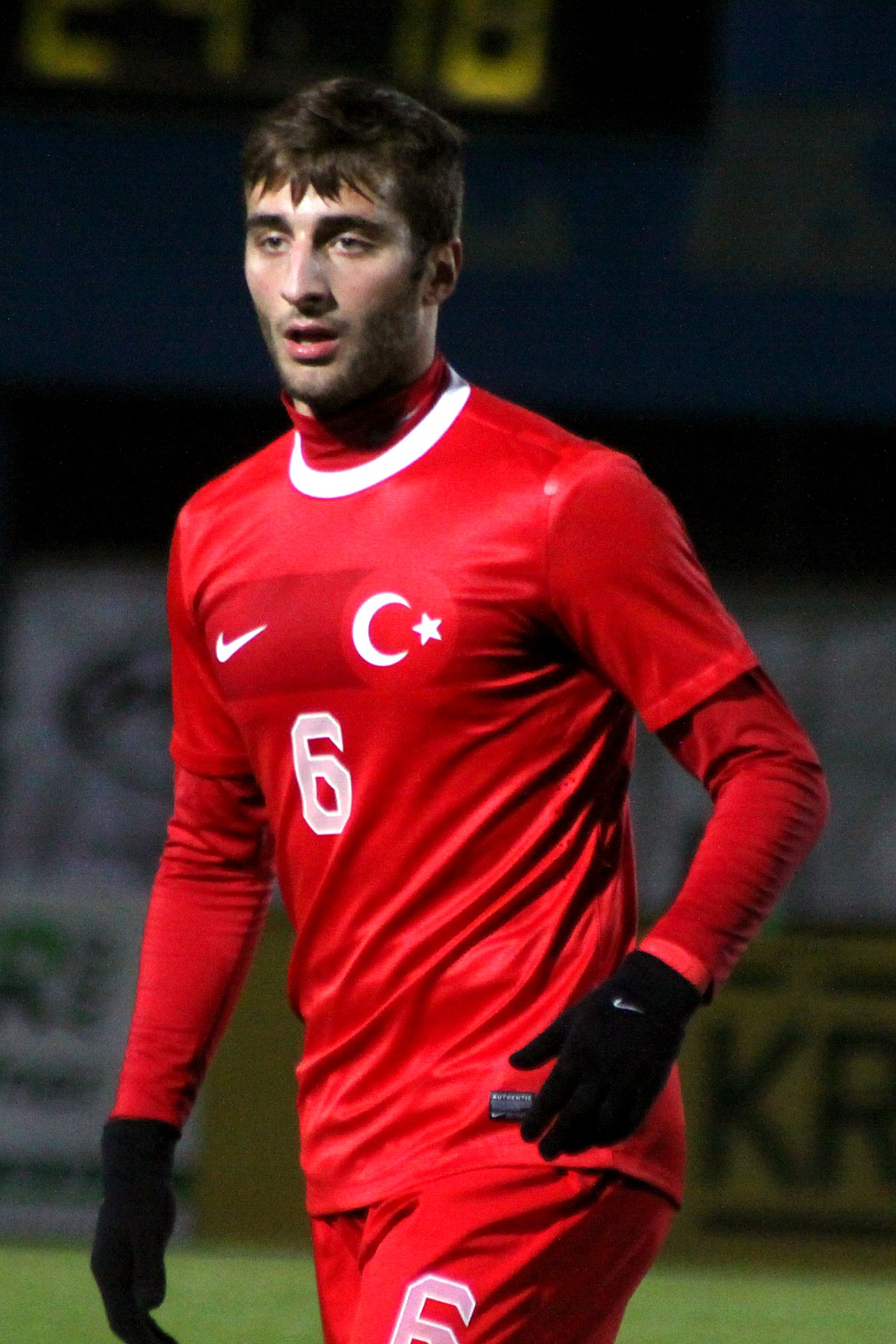
With Turkey U21 in 2013

Öztürk made his international debut for the Turkey under-18 team in November 2010, in the starting eleven for a friendly match against their German counterparts, and came off the substitutes' bench against the same opponents two days later. In January 2011, he was selected for his native Belgium's under-18 team, and was in the starting eleven for two friendlies against France U18. He played twice more a few weeks later in friendlies against Estonia U18, and twice more in the 2011 Slovakia Cup.

In August 2011, Öztürk moved up to the Belgium under-19 team, becoming a regular selection both in friendly matches and in qualification for the 2012 UEFA under-19 championships. He scored his first international goal in a 4–1 friendly defeat of Turkey on 7 September.

In February 2013, Öztürk was called up to the Turkish under-21 squad for the upcoming match against Norway, but played no part. He did appear for Turkey's under-20 side in two friendly matches against their Portuguese counterparts in March 2013 – in the first of the two, he scored the second goal in a 2–1 win. Selected for Turkey's squad for the 2013 FIFA U-20 World Cup, he started all three of Turkey's group matches and their second-round defeat to eventual winners France. Öztürk made his under-21 debut for Turkey in their opening qualification match for the 2015 European championships, a 4–0 home win against Malta. He made his debut for Turkey national football team on 1 September 2021 in a World Cup qualifier against Montenegro.

== Personal ==
Öztürk was born and raised in Belgium by Turkish immigrants.

== Career statistics ==
=== Club ===
As of match played 23 August 2024

Appearances and goals by club, season and competition
Club	Season	League			National Cup (Note: Includes Belgian Cup, Turkish Cup)		Europe		Other		Total	
Club	Season	Division	Apps	Goals	Apps	Goals	Apps	Goals	Apps	Goals	Apps	Goals
Beerschot	2011–12	JPL	10	0	1	0	—		5 (Note: Appearance(s) in JPL play-off)	0	16	0
Beerschot	2012–13	JPL	25	1	1	0	—		1 (Note: Appearance(s) in JPL play-out)	0	27	1
Beerschot	Total		35	1	2	0	—		6	0	43	1
Standard Liège	2013–14	JPL	11	0	1	0	5 (Note: Appearance(s) in UEFA Europa League)	0	—		17	0
Kasımpaşa (loan)	2013–14	Süper Lig	10	0	0	0	—		—		10	0
Kasımpaşa (loan)	2014–15	Süper Lig	23	0	1	0	—		—		24	0
Kasımpaşa (loan)	Total		33	0	1	0	—		—		34	0
Eskişehirspor (loan)	2015–16	Süper Lig	15	0	3	0	—		—		18	0
Elazığspor	2016–17	1. Lig	3	0	0	0	—		—		3	0
Elazığspor	2017–18	1. Lig	29	8	0	0	—		—		29	8
Elazığspor	Total		32	8	0	0	—		—		32	8
Göztepe	2018–19	Süper Lig	25	3	5	0	—		—		30	3
Göztepe	2019–20	Süper Lig	24	7	1	0	—		—		25	7
Göztepe	2020–21	Süper Lig	21	3	0	0	—		—		21	3
Göztepe	Total		70	13	6	0	—		—		76	13
Galatasaray	2021–22	Süper Lig	11	0	1	1	4 (Note: One appearance in UEFA Champions League, three appearances in UEFA Europa League)	0	—		16	1
Eyüpspor (loan)	2022–23	1. Lig	15	1	0	0	—		3 (Note: Appearance(s) in 1. Lig play-off)	1	18	2
Pendikspor	2023–24	Süper Lig	22	2	1	0	—		—		23	2
Career total			244	25	15	1	9	0	9	1	277	27
