= Murat Paluli =

Turkish footballer

Personal information
- Date of birth: 9 August 1994 (age 32)
- Place of birth: Erzurum, Turkey
- Height: 1.75 m (5 ft 9 in)
- Position: Right back

Team information
- Current team: Sivasspor
- Number: 99

Youth career
- 2007–2010: Sanayispor
- 2010–2013: Başakşehir

Senior career*
Years	Team	Apps	(Gls)
2013–2015	İskenderunspor	65	(2)
2015–2017	BB Erzurumspor	40	(0)
2017–2019	Hatayspor	45	(0)
2019–2022	Göztepe	66	(0)
2022–	Sivasspor	105	(1)
- * Club domestic league appearances and goals as of 6 May 2026

Murat Paluli (born 9 August 1994) is a Turkish professional footballer who plays as a right back for Sivasspor.

== Professional career ==
On 6 June 2019, Paluli signed his first professional contract with Göztepe. Paluli made his professional debut in a 1-0 Süper Lig win over Trabzonspor on 2 November 2019.

On 6 June 2022, Paluli signed a two-year contract with Sivasspor.

== Career statistics ==
As of match played on 18 November 2024

Appearances and goals by club, season and competition
Club	Season	League			Cup		Europe		Total	
Club	Season	Division	Apps	Goals	Apps	Goals	Apps	Goals	Apps	Goals
İskenderunspor	2013–14	TFF 2. Lig	31	1	2	0	—		33	1
İskenderunspor	2014–15	TFF 2. Lig	34	1	0	0	—		34	1
İskenderunspor	Total		65	2	2	0	—		67	2
Erzumrumspor	2015–16	TFF 3. Lig	18	0	1	0	—		19	0
Erzumrumspor	2016–17	TFF 2. Lig	22	0	2	1	—		24	1
Erzumrumspor	Total		40	0	3	1	—		43	1
Hatayspor	2017–18	TFF 2. Lig	12	0	0	0	—		12	0
Hatayspor	2018–19	TFF 1. Lig	33	0	2	0	—		35	0
Hatayspor	Total		45	0	2	0	—		47	0
Göztepe	2019–20	Süper Lig	10	0	5	1	—		15	1
Göztepe	2020–21	Süper Lig	34	0	1	0	—		35	0
Göztepe	2021–22	Süper Lig	22	0	2	0	—		24	0
Göztepe	Total		66	0	8	1	—		74	1
Sivasspor	2022–23	Süper Lig	20	0	1	0	5 (Note: Appearances in UEFA Champions League)	0	26	0
Sivasspor	2023–24	Süper Lig	21	0	1	0	—		22	0
Sivasspor	2024–25	Süper Lig	12	1	3	0	—		15	1
Sivasspor	Total		53	1	5	0	5	0	63	1
Career total			269	3	20	2	5	0	294	5
