= Ankaraspor =

Turkish football club

- Full name: Ankaraspor Kulübü AS
- Founded: 1978; 48 years ago 2020 (refounded)
- Stadium: Etimesgut Belediyesi Atatürk Stadyumu
- Capacity: 2,640
- Owner: Ahmet Okatan
- President: Mehmet Emin Katipoğlu
- Head coach: Olcay Şahan (player-coach)
- League: TFF 2. Lig
- 2025–26: TFF 2. Lig, White, 10th of 19
- Website: www.ankaraspor2020.com
Home colours	Away colours	Third colours

Sincan Belediyesi Ankaraspor Kulübü, commonly known as Ankaraspor (Turkish pronunciation: [ˈaŋkaɾaspoɾ]), is a Turkish professional football club based in the country's capital Ankara. Founded in 1978, the club competes in the TFF Second League. The club was known as Osmanlıspor from 2014 to 2020.

== History ==
Previous club logo in Osmanlıspor era

Ankaraspor was founded as "Ankara Belediye Spor Kulübü" (Ankara Municipality Sport Club) in 1978. The club has undergone several name changes throughout its history. In 1984, they were renamed "Ankara Büyükşehir Belediye Spor Kulübü" (adding "Metropolitan" to the name). The name was simply switched to "Büyükşehir Belediye Ankaraspor Kulübü" in 1998. "Büyükşehir Belediye Ankaraspor Kulübü" has many sub-divisions branching from its main football division. These include badminton, basketball, boxing, handball, ice hockey, judo, oil wrestling, table tennis, wrestling. Finally, in 2005, the football club changed its name to "Ankaraspor A.Ş." and only focused on football, while "Büyükşehir Belediye Ankaraspor Kulübü" continued its activity on branches other than football.

On 15 September 2009, Ankaraspor was demoted from the Turkish Super League by The Professional Football Disciplinary Committee (PFDK) over its unsportsmanlike relationship with Ankaragücü, which was deemed contrary to sporting competitiveness. All Ankaraspor games in the 2009–10 season were cancelled and awarded 3–0 to Ankaraspor's opponents by default. Ankaraspor was expelled from the Turkish leagues by TFF on 4 August 2010 due to being sued by TFF for objecting to forced relegation in 2009–10. No league operations for the season from 2010 to 2011 Ankaraspor (A2)B Team for season year for one year until 2010/2011

In the 2013–14 season, they were readmitted to TFF First League. In the 2014–15 season, they were champions of the division, resulting in their promotion to the Süper Lig.

On 29 June 2014, the club adopted the name "Osmanlıspor", which refers to Osman I, founder of the Ottoman Empire.

On 8 September 2020, Osmanlıspor was renamed Ankaraspor, their former name.

== Club badge and colours ==
Ankaraspor's home colours are blue and white.

The previous badge consisted of a blue and white colored shield, which bore the name and the foundation year of the club. The shield featured a view of an Anatolian leopard with some hexagon panels of a football in its head and chest. This animal, which lived in Anatolia and especially near Ankara for a period of time, symbolized the power and dignity of the club.

== Stadium ==
Ankaraspor play their home matches at Yenikent Stadium which was opened in 1974 and renovated in 2008.

== European participations ==
As of 23 February 2017

Competition	Pld	W	D	L	GF	GA	GD
UEFA Europa League	14	8	3	3	23	12	+11
UEFA Intertoto Cup	2	1	0	1	1	4	–3
Total	16	9	3	4	24	16	+8

Season	Competition	Round	Club	Home	Away	Aggregate
2005	UEFA Intertoto Cup	2R	(Slovakia) Dubnica	0–4	1–0	1–4
2016–17	UEFA Europa League	2Q	(Moldova) Zimbru Chișinău	5–0	2–2	7–2
2016–17	UEFA Europa League	3Q	(Estonia) Nõmme Kalju	1–0	2–0	3–0
2016–17	UEFA Europa League	PO	(Denmark) Midtjylland	2–0	1–0	3–0
2016–17	UEFA Europa League	GS; Group L	(Spain) Villarreal	2–2	2–1	1st
2016–17	UEFA Europa League	GS; Group L	(Switzerland) Zürich	2–0	1–2	1st
2016–17	UEFA Europa League	GS; Group L	(Romania) FCSB	2–0	1–2	1st
2016–17	UEFA Europa League	R32	(Greece) Olympiacos	0–3	0–0	0–3

UEFA Ranking history:

As of 2021

Season	Rank	Points	Ref.
2017	122 ▲	15.840	
2018	147 ▼	8.000	
2019	137 ▲	8.000	
2020	142 ▼	8.000	
2021	137 ▲	8.000	

== Players ==
=== Squad ===
As of 1 October 2026

Note: Flags indicate national team as defined under FIFA eligibility rules; some limited exceptions apply. Players may hold more than one non-FIFA nationality.

No.	Pos.	Nation	Player
1	GK	TUR	Muhammet Can Tuncer
3	DF	TUR	Batuhan Adıgüzel
5	DF	TUR	Enes Subaşı
6	MF	TUR	Selman Enes Canlı
7	DF	TUR	Alaaddin Okumuş
8	MF	TUR	Samet Emre Gündüz
9	FW	TUR	Yusuf Buğra Koşal
10	MF	TUR	Serdarcan Eralp
11	FW	TUR	Batuhan Kırdaroğlu
12	DF	TUR	Oğuzhan Çapar
17	FW	TUR	Erdem Onur Beytaş
19	MF	TUR	Doğukan Efe
20	FW	TUR	Burak Tarlabölen
22	DF	TUR	Ömer Alper Tatlısu
23	MF	TUR	Emre Can Örme

No.	Pos.	Nation	Player
25	MF	TUR	Halil Esen
27	GK	TUR	Emirhan Küçüksolak (on loan from Keçiörengücü U19)
33	DF	TUR	Onur Atasayar
36	FW	TUR	İsmail Yahşi
41	MF	TUR	Emre Kaya (on loan from Keçiörengücü)
54	DF	TUR	Ömer Faruk Yılmaz
61	FW	TUR	Mehmet Efe Çakmak (on loan from Keçiörengücü U19)
66	DF	TUR	Berkant Gündem
77	FW	TUR	Ramazan Eren Demir
89	DF	TUR	Berkay Akbaş
91	FW	TUR	Hacı Doğru
93	MF	TUR	Hüseyin Tosun
94	FW	TUR	Muhammed Ertürk
98	GK	TUR	Mert Zencirkıran
99	GK	TUR	Adal Beran Bülbül
