= Batuhan Kırdaroğlu =

Turkish footballer

Personal information
- Date of birth: 10 September 2000 (age 26)
- Place of birth: Gebze, Turkey
- Height: 1.78 m (5 ft 10 in)
- Position: Midfielder

Team information
- Current team: Ankaraspor
- Number: 11

Youth career
- 2011–2015: Beylikbağıspor
- 2015–2018: Göztepe

Senior career*
Years	Team	Apps	(Gls)
2018–2019	Pendikspor	27	(4)
2019–2023	Göztepe	2	(0)
2020	→ Altınordu (loan)	7	(0)
2021–2022	→ Menemenspor (loan)	22	(1)
2022–2023	→ Serik Belediyespor (loan)	22	(1)
2023–2025	Ankaraspor	55	(6)
2026–	Ankaraspor	0	(0)
- * Club domestic league appearances and goals as of 3 May 2025

Batuhan Kırdaroğlu (born 10 September 2000) is a Turkish professional footballer who plays as a midfielder for Ankaraspor.

== Professional career ==
On 3 July 2019, Kırdaroğlu signed his first professional contract with Göztepe. Kırdaroğlu made his professional debut in a 0-0 Süper Lig tie with Çaykur Rizespor on 15 September 2019.
