= Khadim Rassoul =

Senegalese footballer

Personal information
- Full name: Joher Khadim Rassoul
- Date of birth: 31 December 1995 (age 30)
- Place of birth: Dakar, Senegal
- Height: 1.87 m (6 ft 1 1/2 in)
- Positions: Defender; defensive midfielder

Youth career
- 2008–2015: AS Pikine
- 2015: Anderlecht

Senior career*
Years	Team	Apps	(Gls)
2015–2019	Lokeren	52	(0)
2019–2022	Adana Demirspor	92	(1)
2022–2023	Eyüpspor	0	(0)
2022–2023	→ Alanyaspor (loan)	13	(0)
2023–2024	Pendikspor	13	(0)
2025	UTA Arad	10	(0)
2025–2026	Duhok	31	(1)
2026–	Al-Arabi	0	(0)
- * Club domestic league appearances and goals as of 17 May 2026

Joher Khadim Rassoul (born 31 December 1995) is a Senegalese professional footballer who plays plays for Al-Arabi as a defender or a defensive midfielder.

== Career ==
Rassoul joined Lokeren in 2015 from Anderlecht. He made his Belgian Pro League debut on 28 November 2015 against Charleroi.

On 17 January 2019, he has joined Adana Demirspor with a two-and-a-half-year contract.

On 20 July 2023, he signed with Süper Lig club Pendikspor.

== Honours ==
Adana Demirspor

- TFF First League: 2020–21
