= Göktuğ Bakırbaş =

Turkish footballer

Personal information
- Full name: Mehmet Göktuğ Bakırbaş
- Date of birth: 1 June 1996 (age 30)
- Place of birth: Konak, İzmir, Turkey
- Height: 1.96 m (6 ft 5 in)
- Position: Goalkeeper

Team information
- Current team: Sivasspor
- Number: 1

Youth career
- 2006–2016: Göztepe

Senior career*
Years	Team	Apps	(Gls)
2016–2021	Göztepe	12	(0)
2017–2018	→ Manisaspor (loan)	18	(1)
2020–2021	→ Ümraniyespor (loan)	3	(0)
2021–2025	Erzurumspor	81	(0)
2025–	Sivasspor	22	(0)

International career^{‡}
2010–2011	Turkey U15	2	(0)
2011–2012	Turkey U16	6	(0)
2012	Turkey U17	2	(0)
2014	Turkey U19	1	(0)
- * Club domestic league appearances and goals as of 6 May 2026 ‡ National team caps and goals as of 25 August 2018

Mehmet Göktuğ Bakırbaş (born 1 June 1996) is a Turkish professional footballer who plays as a goalkeeper for TFF 1. Lig club Sivasspor.

== Professional career ==
Bakırbaş is a youth product of Göztepe, and signed his first professional contract with them. Bakırbaş spent the 2017-18 season on loan with Manisaspor in the TFF First League, and on 3 March 2018 scored a game-tying goal in the 90th minute against Denizlispor. Bakırbaş made his professional debut with Göztepe in a 1-0 Süper Lig loss to Galatasaray on 19 August 2018.
