= Burak Süleyman =

Turkish footballer

Personal information
- Date of birth: 1 September 1994 (age 32)
- Place of birth: İzmit, Turkey
- Height: 1.69 m (5 ft 7 in)
- Position: Winger

Team information
- Current team: Fethiyespor
- Number: 10

Youth career
- 2004–2012: Kocaeli Güneşspor

Senior career*
| Years | Team | Apps | (Gls) |
| 2012–2013 | Sancaktepe | 6 | (1) |
| 2013–2015 | Gölcükspor | 32 | (5) |
| 2015–2020 | Kocaelispor | 166 | (44) |
| 2020–2021 | Göztepe | 5 | (0) |
| 2021–2022 | Bandırmaspor | 13 | (2) |
| 2022–2024 | Sakaryaspor | 75 | (14) |
| 2024 | Pendikspor | 2 | (0) |
| 2024–2025 | Çorum | 24 | (3) |
| 2025–2026 | Manisa | 16 | (4) |
| 2026 | Aliağa FK | 14 | (4) |
| 2026– | Fethiyespor | 6 | (1) |
- * Club domestic league appearances and goals as of 14 November 2026

Burak Süleyman (born 1 September 1994) is a Turkish professional footballer who plays as a winger for TFF 2. Lig club Fethiyespor.

== Career ==
Süleyman signed his first contract with Göztepe, after spending most of his early career in amateur leagues with Kocaelispor. Süleyman made his professional debut with Göztepe in a 1-1 Süper Lig tie with BB Erzurumspor on 7 November 2020.
