= Yalçın Kayan =

Turkish footballer

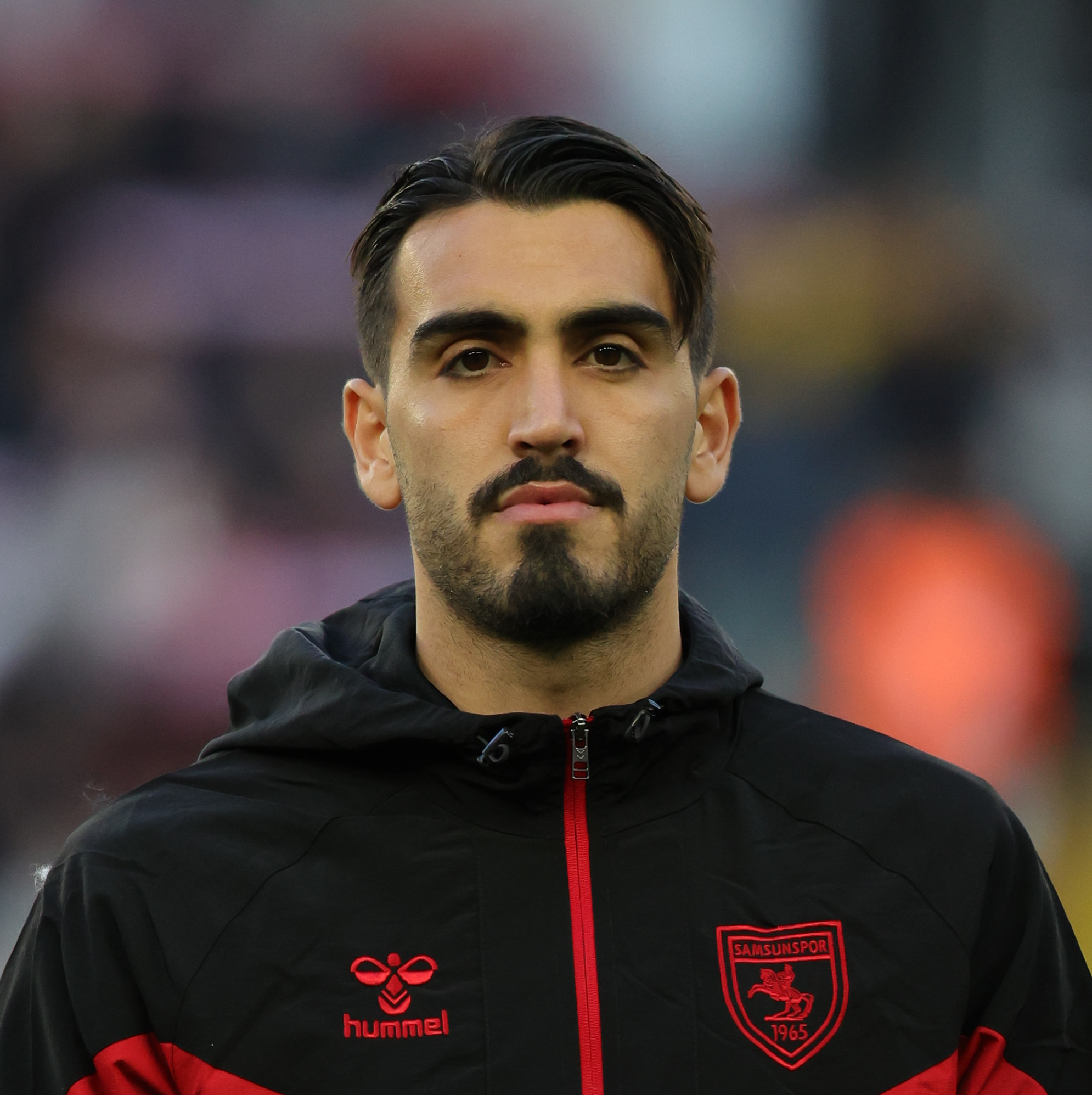

Personal information
- Date of birth: 30 January 1999 (age 27)
- Place of birth: Konak, Turkey
- Height: 1.80 m (5 ft 11 in)
- Position: Midfielder

Team information
- Current team: Samsunspor
- Number: 20

Youth career
- 2010–2013: Altay
- 2013–2016: Karşıyaka
- 2016–2018: Göztepe

Senior career*
Years	Team	Apps	(Gls)
2018–2025	Göztepe	128	(13)
2025–2026	Eyüpspor	17	(0)
2026–	Samsunspor	14	(0)
- * Club domestic league appearances and goals as of 10 June 2026

Yalçın Kayan (born 30 January 1999) is a Turkish professional footballer who plays as a midfielder for Samsunspor.

== Professional career ==
Kayan made his professional debut for in a 2–0 Süper Lig win over Kayserispor on 15 September 2018.

== Career statistics ==
As of 11 May 2024.

Club	Season	League			Cup		Europe		Other		Total	
Club	Season	Division	Apps	Goals	Apps	Goals	Apps	Goals	Apps	Goals	Apps	Goals
Göztepe	2018–19	Süper Lig	2	0	3	0	—		—		5	0
Göztepe	2019–20	Süper Lig	12	0	6	0	—		—		18	0
Göztepe	2020–21	Süper Lig	18	2	2	0	—		—		20	2
Göztepe	2021–22	Süper Lig	29	0	1	0	—		—		30	0
Göztepe	2022–23	1. Lig	33	2	2	0	—		1	0	35	2
Göztepe	2023–24	1. Lig	34	9	1	0	—		—		35	9
Career total			128	13	15	0	0	0	1	0	144	13
