= Berkan Emir =

Turkish footballer (born 1988)

Personal information
- Date of birth: 6 February 1988 (age 38)
- Place of birth: İzmit, Turkey
- Height: 1.78 m (5 ft 10 in)
- Position: Defender

Youth career
- 2000–2001: Kocaeli Birlik Spor
- 2001–2004: Kocaelispor
- 2004–2005: Beşiktaş
- 2005–2007: Kocaelispor

Senior career*
Years	Team	Apps	(Gls)
2007–2009	Orhangazispor	49	(4)
2009–2010	Bursa Nilüfer	16	(0)
2010–2011	Gümüşhanespor	27	(0)
2011–2013	Kahramanmaraşspor	66	(8)
2013–2015	Karşıyaka	44	(2)
2015	Balıkesirspor	16	(2)
2015–2016	Kayserispor	19	(0)
2016–2018	Alanyaspor	35	(0)
2018–2022	Göztepe	118	(6)
2022–2023	Eyüpspor	14	(0)
- * Club domestic league appearances and goals as of 12 June 2023

Berkan Emir (born 6 February 1988) is a Turkish footballer who plays as a defender.
