= Lamine Gassama =

Senegalese footballer (born 1989)

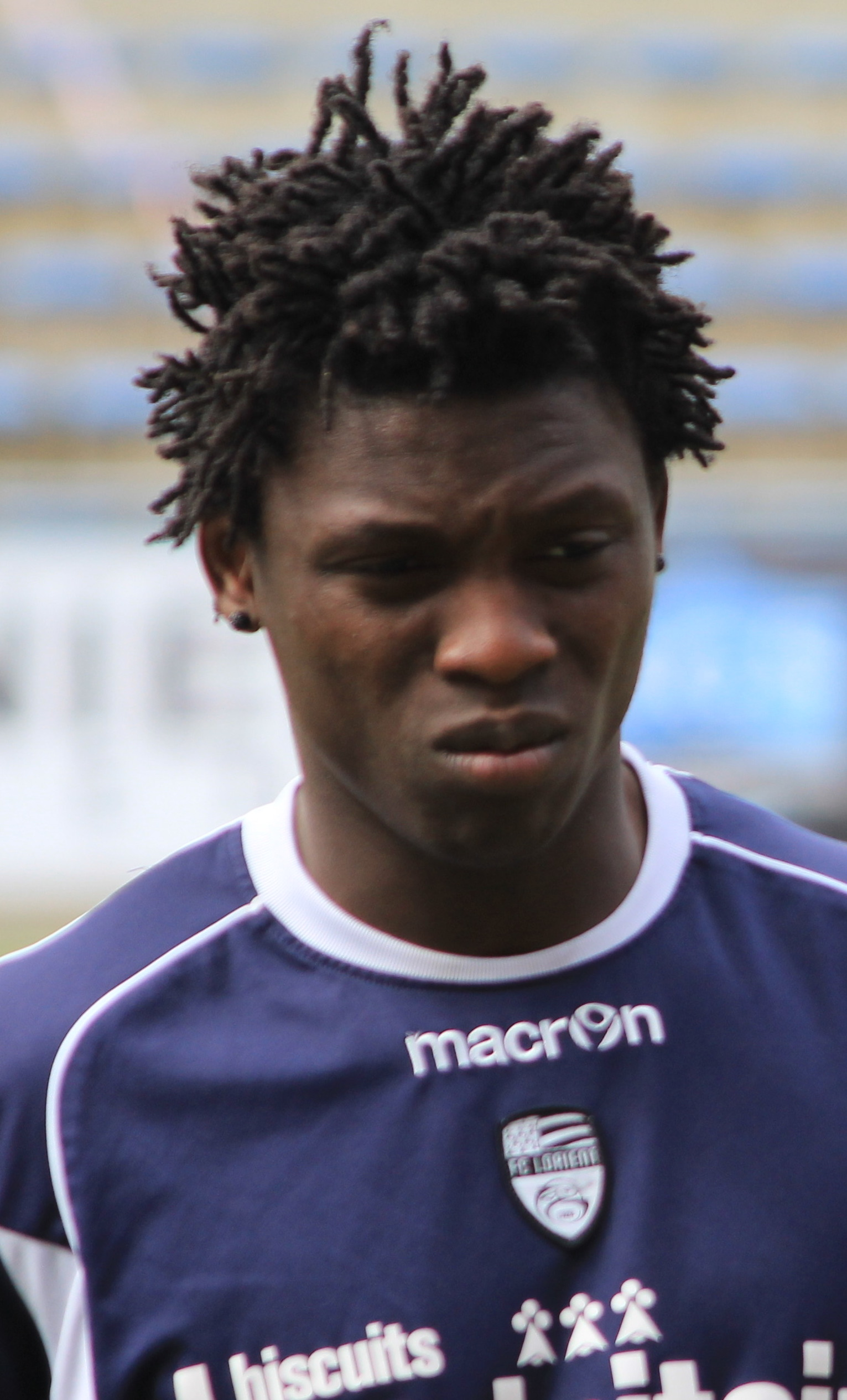
- Gassama with Lorient in 2013

Personal information
- Date of birth: 20 October 1989 (age 37)
- Place of birth: Marseille, France
- Height: 1.81 m (5 ft 11 in)
- Position: Right back

Team information
- Current team: Berre SC
- Number: 20

Youth career
- 1997–2002: Nouvelle Vague Jeunes
- 2002–2003: Pennes Mirabeau
- 2003–2005: Martigues
- 2005–2006: Aubagne
- 2006–2008: Lyon

Senior career*
Years	Team	Apps	(Gls)
2008–2012	Lyon	17	(0)
2010–2012	Lyon B	12	(0)
2012–2016	Lorient	110	(1)
2012–2013	Lorient B	7	(0)
2016–2018	Alanyaspor	60	(0)
2018–2021	Göztepe	72	(0)
2022	Sabadell	5	(0)
2022–2024	Lausanne-Ouchy	45	(1)
2025–2026	FC Septèmes	0	(0)
2026–	Berre SC	1	(0)

International career^{‡}
2008	France U21	3	(0)
2011–2021	Senegal	49	(0)
Medal record
Africa Cup of Nations
Runner-up	2019 Egypt
- * Club domestic league appearances and goals as of 27 May 2024 ‡ National team caps and goals as of 23:39, 17 November 2019 (UTC)

Lamine Gassama (born 20 October 1989) is a Senegalese professional footballer who plays as a right back for Berre SC.

== Career ==
=== Early career ===
Gassama grew up in the neighbourhood of La Castellane in the city of Marseille. He began his career playing for FC Martigues, just north of his hometown. After spending two years in the youth system, he returned to Marseille and joined local club Aubagne FC. There, he caught the attention of Olympique Lyonnais and joined the club's academy the following year.

=== Lyon ===
Before the start of the 2008–09 season, Gassama was promoted to the first-team squad participating in Lyon's pre-season tour. He appeared in all five matches including starts against Nîmes Olympique, Rapid București, and AS Nancy. On 2 September 2008, it was announced by Lyon that Gassama had signed a professional contract keeping him with the champions until 2011. He made his professional football debut on 29 October 2008 against FC Sochaux-Montbéliard starting in the right back position. The match resulted in a 2–0 victory with Gassama playing the full 90 minutes.

Gassama made seven league appearances, and also made his debut in the UEFA Champions League starting Lyon's final group stage match against Bayern Munich, with his primary responsibility being to contain fellow Frenchman and the much more experienced Franck Ribéry. The matchup, in the end, was unquestionably in Ribéry's favor, as Lyon lost the match 2–3 with the French talisman being involved in two of Bayern's goals and Gassama being substituted out in the 64th minute.

=== Lorient ===
On 26 January 2012, Gassama joined Lorient on a free transfer, after Olympique Lyonnais decided not to extend his contract.

=== Lausanne-Ouchy ===
On 11 July 2022, Gassama signed with Lausanne-Ouchy in Switzerland.

== International career ==
Gassama made no appearances with any of France's youth squads. However, due to his performances with Lyon, he received a surprise call-up to the under-21 squad, who were looking to start fresh after their elimination from the 2009 UEFA European Under-21 Football Championship, for a friendly against Denmark. He made his under-21 debut in that match starting the match in the right back position before being subbed out in the 82nd minute. France would go on to win the match 1–0.

In May 2011, it was confirmed that Gassama would be representing Senegal at senior international level. He made his debut on 10 August 2011 in a 0–2 friendly home defeat against Morocco.

In May 2018 he was named in Senegal's 23-man squad for the 2018 FIFA World Cup in Russia.

== Career statistics ==
=== Club ===
As of match played 13 May 2017

Club	Season	League		Cup		League Cup		Europe		Total	
Club	Season	Apps	Goals	Apps	Goals	Apps	Goals	Apps	Goals	Apps	Goals
Lyon	2008–09	7	0	1	0	1	0	1	0	10	0
Lyon	2009–10	6	0	1	0	0	0	2	0	9	0
Lyon	2010–11	4	0	1	0	0	0	0	0	5	0
Lyon	Total	17	0	3	0	1	0	3	0	24	0
Lorient	2011–12	8	0	1	0	0	0	0	0	9	0
Lorient	2012–13	16	0	2	0	0	0	0	0	18	0
Lorient	2013–14	24	0	1	0	1	0	0	0	26	0
Lorient	2014–15	31	1	0	0	0	0	0	0	31	1
Lorient	2015–16	31	0	1	0	0	0	0	0	32	0
Lorient	Total	110	1	5	0	1	0	0	0	116	1
Career total		128	1	8	0	2	0	3	0	140	1

== Honours ==
=== Individual ===
- Africa Cup of Nations Team of the Tournament: 2019

=== International ===
As of 17 November 2019

Senegal
Year	Apps	Goals
2011	3	0
2012	0	0
2013	5	0
2014	1	0
2015	9	0
2016	6	0
2017	9	0
2018	5	0
2019	9	0
Total	47	0
