= Titi (footballer, born 1988) =

Brazilian footballer

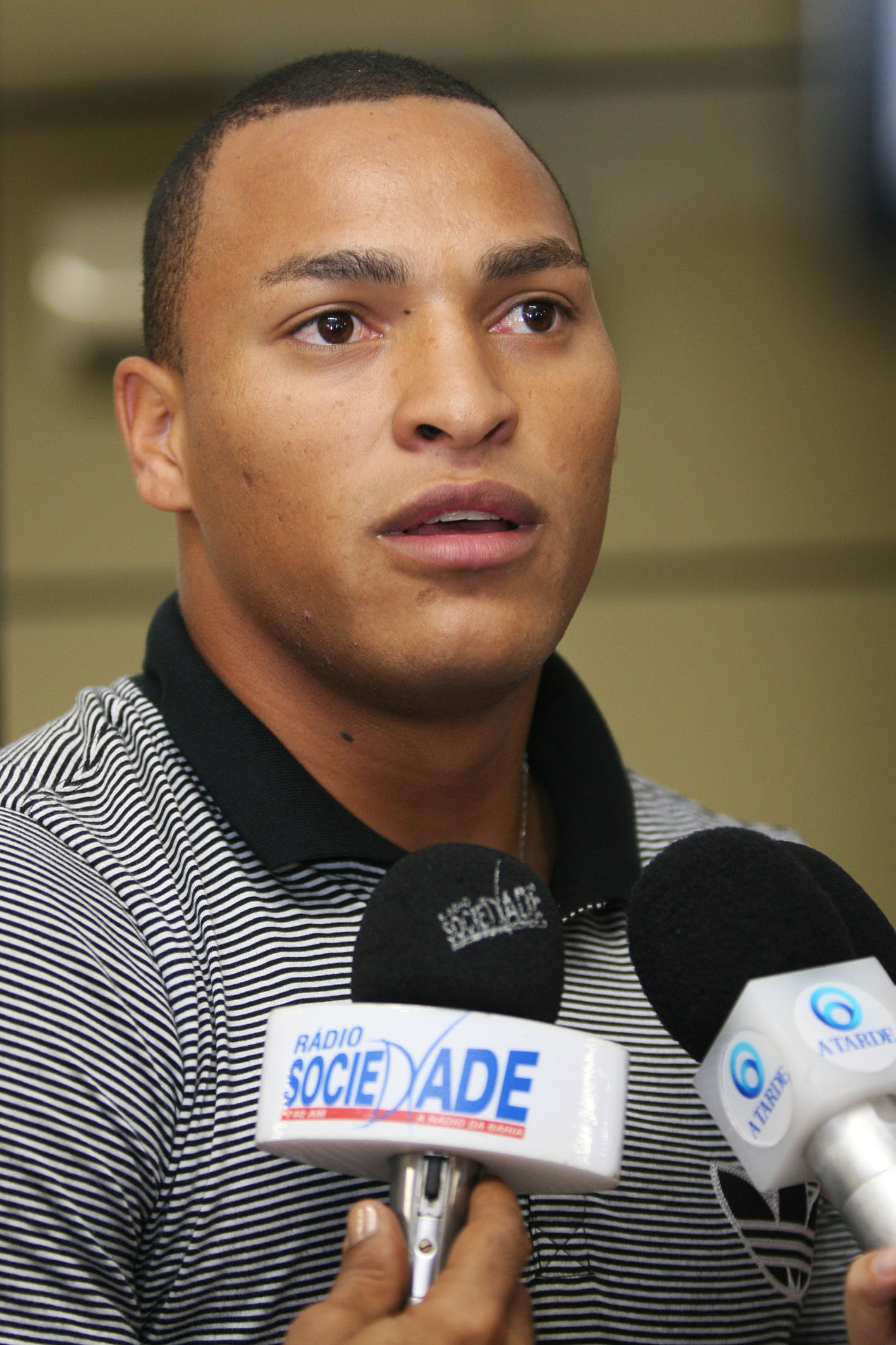

Personal information
- Full name: Cristian Chagas Tarouco
- Date of birth: 12 March 1988 (age 38)
- Place of birth: Pelotas, Brazil
- Height: 1.89 m (6 ft 2 1/2 in)
- Position: Centre back

Team information
- Current team: Juventude
- Number: 3

Youth career
- 2002–2006: Internacional

Senior career*
Years	Team	Apps	(Gls)
2007–2011	Internacional	10	(0)
2008	→ Náutico (loan)	7	(0)
2009–2010	→ Vasco da Gama (loan)	57	(2)
2011	→ Bahia (loan)	51	(2)
2012–2015	Bahia	158	(7)
2015–2017	Kasımpaşa	66	(9)
2017–2018	Bursaspor	31	(1)
2018–2021	Göztepe	82	(1)
2021–2025	Fortaleza	227	(6)
2025	Goiás	20	(0)
2026–	Juventude	15	(0)
- * Club domestic league appearances and goals as of 17 November 2026

Cristian Chagas Tarouco, or simply Titi, (born 12 March 1988, in Pelotas) is a Brazilian professional footballer who plays as a centre back for Juventude.

Titi is widely regarded as a formidable "tank" and has attained many nicknames, such as "Brazilian Nesta" and "The Fridge". He is left footed.

== Career statistics ==
As of 15 November 2021

Club	Season	League			State League		Cup		Conmebol		Other		Total	
Club	Season	Division	Apps	Goals	Apps	Goals	Apps	Goals	Apps	Goals	Apps	Goals	Apps	Goals
Internacional	2007	Série A	2	0	2	0	—		0	0	—		4	0
Internacional	2008	Série A	1	0	5	0	2	0	—		—		8	0
Internacional	Subtotal		3	0	7	0	2	0	0	0	—		12	0
Náutico (loan)	2008	Série A	7	0	—		—		—		—		7	0
Vasco da Gama	2009	Série B	18	1	13	1	3	0	—		—		34	2
Vasco da Gama	2010	Série A	13	0	13	0	4	0	—		—		30	0
Vasco da Gama	Subtotal		31	1	26	1	7	0	—		—		64	2
Bahia	2011	Série A	32	2	19	0	6	0	—		—		57	2
Bahia	2012	Série A	34	0	21	1	7	0	2 (Note: Appearance(s) in Copa Sudamericana)	0	—		64	1
Bahia	2013	Série A	32	0	12	1	2	0	4	0	6 (Note: Appearance(s) in Copa do Nordeste)	0	56	1
Bahia	2014	Série A	24	1	12	1	5	0	4	1	6	0	51	3
Bahia	2015	Série B	12	1	11	2	2	0	—		10	0	35	3
Bahia	Subtotal		134	4	75	5	22	0	10	1	22	0	263	10
Kasımpaşa	2015–16	Süper Lig	33	3	—		0	0	—		—		33	3
Kasımpaşa	2016–17	Süper Lig	33	6	—		6	1	—		—		39	7
Kasımpaşa	Subtotal		66	9	—		6	1	—		—		72	10
Bursaspor	2017–18	Süper Lig	31	1	—		5	0	—		—		36	1
Göztepe	2018–19	Süper Lig	32	0	—		4	0	—		—		36	0
Göztepe	2019–20	Süper Lig	30	0	—		2	0	—		—		32	0
Göztepe	2020–21	Süper Lig	20	1	—		2	0	—		—		22	1
Göztepe	Subtotal		82	1	—		8	0	—		—		90	1
Fortaleza	2021	Série A	28	2	4	0	8	0	—		—		40	2
Career total			382	18	112	6	58	1	10	1	22	0	584	26

== Honours ==
Internacional

- Recopa Sudamericana: 2007
- Campeonato Gaúcho: 2008

Vasco da Gama

- Campeonato Brasileiro Série B: 2009

Bahia

- Campeonato Baiano: 2012, 2014, 2015

Fortaleza

- Campeonato Cearense: 2021, 2022, 2023
- Copa do Nordeste: 2022, 2024
