= Soner Aydoğdu =

Turkish footballer (born 1991)

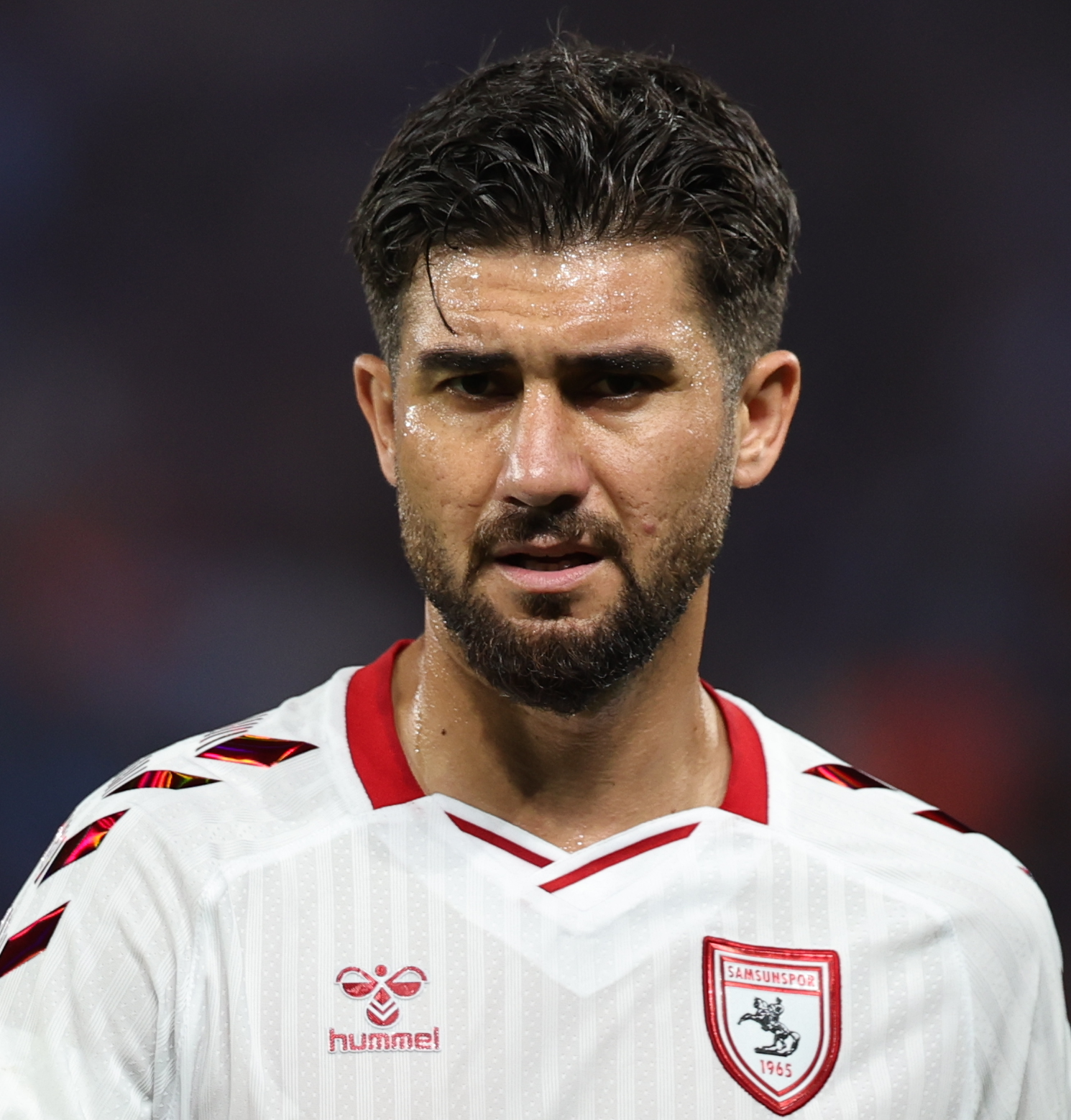
- Aydoğdu in 2025

Personal information
- Date of birth: 5 January 1991 (age 35)
- Place of birth: Mamak, Turkey
- Height: 1.80 m (5 ft 11 in)
- Position: Midfielder

Team information
- Current team: Bursaspor
- Number: 80

Youth career
- 2003–2007: Gençlerbirliği

Senior career*
Years	Team	Apps	(Gls)
2007–2012	Gençlerbirliği	53	(6)
2009–2010	→ Hacettepe (loan)	17	(1)
2012–2016	Trabzonspor	47	(2)
2016–2018	Akhisar Belediyespor	67	(7)
2018–2022	İstanbul Başakşehir	19	(0)
2019–2022	→ Göztepe (loan)	101	(11)
2022–2023	Antalyaspor	13	(0)
2023–2026	Samsunspor	66	(12)
2026–	Bursaspor	3	(1)

International career^{‡}
2006–2007	Turkey U16	11	(0)
2007–2008	Turkey U17	24	(1)
2008	Turkey U18	2	(0)
2008–2010	Turkey U19	15	(3)
2010	Turkey U20	2	(0)
2009–2011	Turkey U21	9	(1)
2012–	Turkey A2	4	(2)
2012	Turkey	2	(0)
- * Club domestic league appearances and goals as of 31 January 2026 ‡ National team caps and goals as of 10 May 2018

Soner Aydoğdu (born 5 January 1991) is a Turkish professional footballer who plays as a midfielder for TFF 1. Lig club Bursaspor.

== Club career ==
Aydoğdu was born in Mamak, and made his professional debut in 2007 as part of the Gençlerbirliği squad. On 19 June 2012, he signed for Trabzonspor on a five-year contract. He made his debut against Karabükspor on 18 August and provided one assist. On 28 November 2013, he scored his first goal for the club in a UEFA Europa League clash against Apollon Limassol, helping the team to win 4–2.

On 10 May 2018, Aydoğdu helped Akhisar Belediyespor win their first professional trophy, the 2017–18 Turkish Cup.

On 11 June 2019, he signed a three-year contract with İstanbul Başakşehir.

On 27 August 2019, he joined Göztepe on a one-year loan.

Aydoğdu joined Antalyaspor on 9 June 2022, signing a two-year contract with an option for an additional year.

On 26 January 2023, Aydoğdu moved to Samsunspor on a 2.5-year contract.

== Career statistics ==
As of match played on 3 March 2019

Appearances and goals by club, season and competition
Club	Season	League			Cup		Other		Total	
Club	Season	Division	Apps	Goals	Apps	Goals	Apps	Goals	Apps	Goals
Gençlerbirliği	2008–09	Süper Lig	12	0	0	0	0	0	12	0
Gençlerbirliği	2010–11	Süper Lig	10	2	4	0	0	0	14	2
Gençlerbirliği	2011–12	Süper Lig	31	4	1	0	4 (Note: Appearances in Spor Toto Cup)	0	36	4
Gençlerbirliği	Total		53	6	5	0	4	0	62	6
Hacettepe (loan)	2009–10	TFF First League	17	1	0	0	0	0	17	1
Trabzonspor	2012–13	Süper Lig	20	1	6	0	1 (Note: Appearance(s) in UEFA Europa League)	0	27	1
Trabzonspor	2013–14	Süper Lig	12	1	1	0	5	1	18	2
Trabzonspor	2014–15	Süper Lig	14	0	7	3	6	0	27	3
Trabzonspor	2015–16	Süper Lig	1	0	3	1	2	1	6	2
Trabzonspor	Total		47	2	17	4	14	2	78	8
Akhisarspor	2015–16	Süper Lig	12	0	3	0	0	0	15	0
Akhisarspor	2016–17	Süper Lig	27	0	8	1	0	0	35	1
Akhisarspor	2017–18	Süper Lig	28	7	7	1	0	0	35	8
Akhisarspor	Total		67	7	18	2	0	0	85	9
İstanbul Başakşehir	2018–19	Süper Lig	14	0	4	0	0	0	18	0
Career totals			198	16	44	6	18	2	260	24

== International career ==
Aydoğdu earned his Turkey national team debut in 2012.

== Honours ==
Akhisarspor

- Turkish Cup: 2017–18
