= Halil Akbunar =

Turkish professional footballer

Personal information
- Full name: Halil Akbunar
- Date of birth: 9 November 1993 (age 33)
- Place of birth: İzmir, Turkey
- Height: 1.70 m (5 ft 7 in)
- Position: Winger

Team information
- Current team: Bursaspor
- Number: 7

Youth career
- 2006–2010: Balçova Idman Yurdu
- 2010–2011: Antalyaspor
- 2011–2012: Göztepe

Senior career*
Years	Team	Apps	(Gls)
2012–2022	Göztepe	293	(45)
2015–2016	→ Elazığspor (loan)	28	(3)
2022–2023	Westerlo	14	(2)
2023–2026	Eyüpspor	58	(6)
2023–2024	→ Pendikspor (loan)	37	(5)
2026–	Bursaspor	21	(3)

International career^{‡}
2012	Turkey U19	2	(0)
2012–2013	Turkey U20	7	(2)
2021–	Turkey	2	(0)
- * Club domestic league appearances and goals as of 15 October 2026 ‡ National team caps and goals as of 27 January 2021

Halil Akbunar (born 9 November 1993) is a Turkish professional footballer who plays as a winger for TFF 1. Lig club Bursaspor and the Turkey national team.

== Club career ==
Akbunar was promoted to the senior team of Göztepe in January 2012 after graduating from their youth academy. On 26 August 2015 he joined Elaziğspor on loan. Halil made his Süper Lig debut for Göztepe in a 2–2 draw against Fenerbahçe, on 12 August 2017.

On 4 July 2022, he signed a three-year contract with Westerlo in Belgium.

On 12 January 2023, Akbunar returned to Turkey and signed a three-and-a-half-year contract with Eyüpspor. On 8 July 2023, he joined Süper Lig newcomer Pendikspor on loan.

On 21 December 2025, he signed with Bursaspor and scored his first goal for the club against Adanaspor.

== International career ==
Akbunar made his senior debut for Turkey on 27 March 2021 in a World Cup qualifier against Norway.

== Career statistics ==
=== Club ===
As of match played on 27 November 2023

Appearances and goals by club, season and competition
Club	Season	League			National Cup		Total	
Club	Season	Division	Apps	Goals	Apps	Goals	Apps	Goals
Göztepe	2011–12	TFF First League	12	2	0	0	12	2
Göztepe	2012–13	TFF First League	27	4	3	0	30	4
Göztepe	2013–14	TFF Second League	30	3	0	0	30	3
Göztepe	2014–15	TFF Second League	27	6	0	0	27	6
Göztepe	2016–17	TFF First League	35	7	1	0	36	7
Göztepe	2017–18	Süper Lig	31	2	1	0	32	2
Göztepe	2018–19	Süper Lig	28	3	6	1	34	4
Göztepe	2019–20	Süper Lig	31	5	2	1	33	6
Göztepe	2020–21	Süper Lig	40	9	2	1	42	10
Göztepe	2021–22	Süper Lig	32	4	2	1	34	5
Göztepe	Total		293	45	17	4	310	49
Elazığspor (loan)	2015–16	TFF First League	28	3	2	0	30	3
Westerlo	2022–23	Belgian Pro League	14	2	1	1	15	3
Eyüpspor	2023–24	TFF First League	19	1	0	0	19	1
Pendikspor (loan)	2023–24	Süper Lig	13	0	0	0	13	0
Career total			367	51	20	5	387	56

=== International ===
As of match played on 12 July 2022

Appearances and goals by national team, year and competition
Team	Year	Competitive		Friendly		Total	
Team	Year	Apps	Goals	Apps	Goals	Apps	Goals
Turkey U19	2012	0	0	2	0	2	0
Turkey U20	2012	0	0	3	1	3	1
Turkey U20	2013	2	0	2	1	4	1
Turkey U20	Total	2	0	5	2	7	2
Turkey	2021	1	0	1	0	2	0
Turkey	2022	0	0	0	0	0	0
Turkey	Total	1	0	1	0	2	0
Career total		3	0	8	2	11	2

== Honours ==
Göztepe

- TFF Second League: 2014-15
- TFF First League, Play-offs winner: 2016-17
