= Xavier Arsène-Henry =

French architect and urban planner

- Born: 10 May 1919; Bordeaux, Gironde, France
- Died: 19 June 2009 (aged 90); Paris, Île-de-France, France
- Occupations: Architect, urban planner

Xavier Arsène-Henry (10 May 1919 – 19 June 2009) was a French modernist architect and urban planner. He designed many tall residential buildings on the outskirts of French cities.

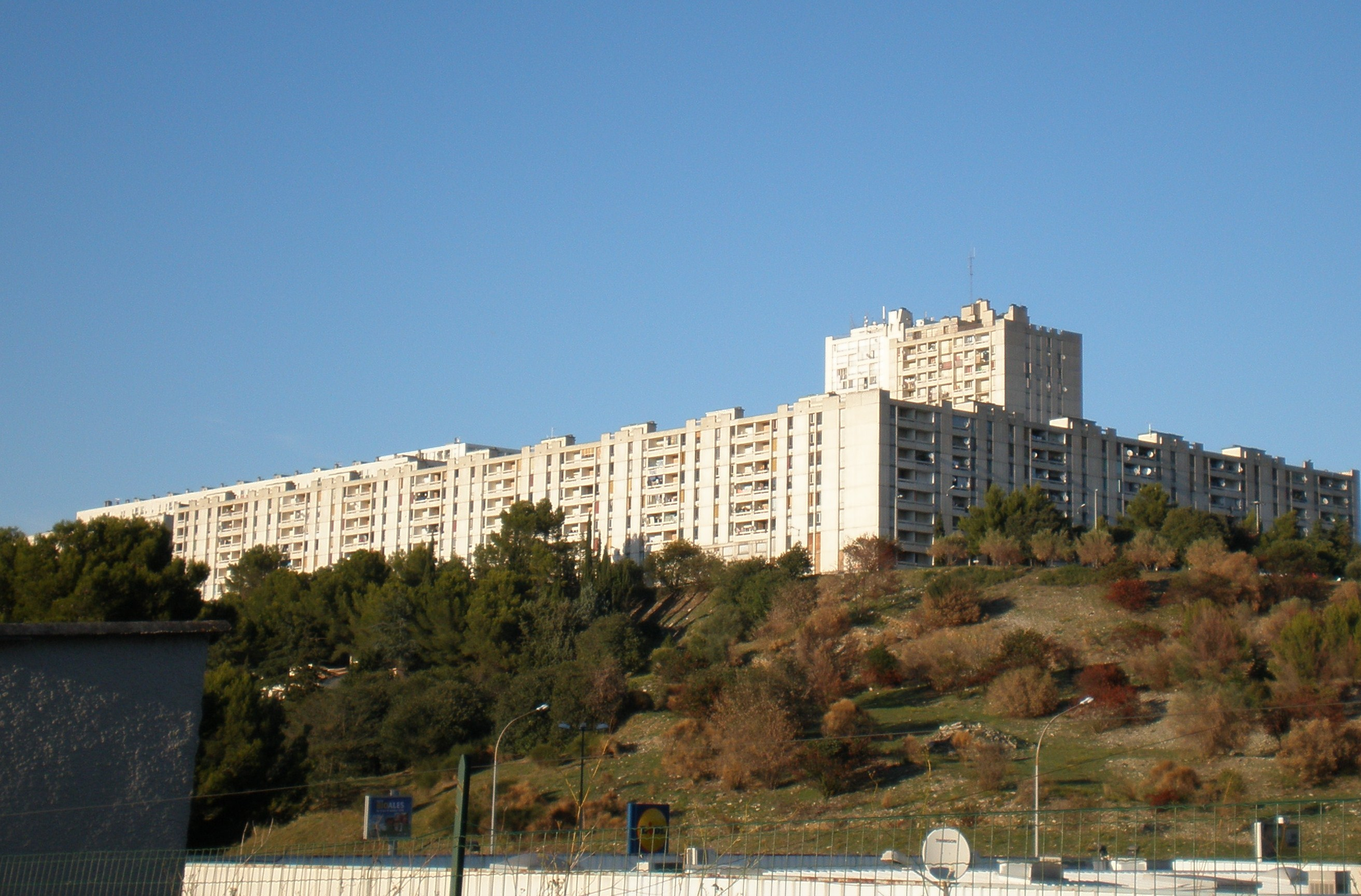
Valdegour, on the northern outskirts of Nîmes.

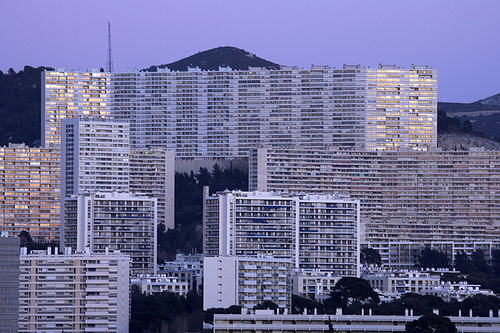
La Rouvière on the southern outskirts of Marseille.

== Early life ==
Xavier Arsène-Henry was born on 10 May 1919 in Bordeaux, France.

== Career ==
He was a proponent of modern architecture.

In 1960, he designed a church, Église Saint Jean-Marie Vianney, located at 1 Place Mozart on the boulevard du Président-Wilson in Reims. That same year, he designed three residential tall buildings in Reims: the Tour Berlioz, the Tour Bach, and the Tour Beethoven. He designed similar residential tall buildings in Montereau-Fault-Yonne a year later, in 1961.

He designed the Tour Chartis, also known as the Tour AIG, in Courbevoie in 1967. A year later, in 1968, he designed the Centrale à béton in Ivry-sur-Seine. That same year, he designed the masterplans of Bordeaux-Lac on the outskirts of his hometown of Bordeaux.

He designed La Rouvière, a neighbourhood on the southern outskirts of Marseille, in 1969. Four years later, in 1973, he designed the offices of the Corsican subsidiary of BNP Paribas at 475 Avenue du Prado in Marseille.

He designed two buildings in Puteaux: Le Galion in 1982 and Le Minerve in 1984.

He was a professor at the École nationale supérieure des Beaux-Arts. He was the recipient of the Rome Prize from the American Academy in Rome.

== Death ==
He died on 19 June 2009 in Paris.

== Bibliography ==
- La ville de l'an 2000 (revue Études, 1972).
- Notre ville, Mame, 1969
- Rentrons, il se fait tard, le long voyage d'un architecte (1919-1998) (Paris: L'Harmattan, 1999).
- J'allais oublier de vous dire... : suite du long voyage d'un architecte, 1998-2002 (Paris, L'Harmattan, 2002).
- Arrêtons nous quelques instants, 3e étape du long voyage d'un architecte (2002-2006) (Paris: L'Harmattan, 2006).
- Cap-Ferret : dessins et textes de Xavier Arsène-Henry : 50 ans de dessins (Elyte, 2008).
