= 2021–22 İstanbul Başakşehir F.K. season =

İstanbul Başakşehir
2021–22 season
- President: Göksel Gümüşdağ
- Head coach: Aykut Kocaman (until 2 October); Emre Belözoğlu (from 3 October)
- Stadium: Başakşehir Fatih Terim Stadium
- Süper Lig: 4th
- Turkish Cup: Fourth round
- Top goalscorer: League: Stefano Okaka (12); All: Stefano Okaka (12)
- Highest home attendance: 2,609 (vs. Beşiktaş, 15 October 2021, Süper Lig)
- Lowest home attendance: 221 (vs. Kayserispor, 28 August 2021, Süper Lig)
- Average home league attendance: 779
- Biggest win: 3–0 (vs. Çaykur Rizespor (H), 26 September 2021, Süper Lig vs. Hatayspor (A), 5 December 2021, Süper Lig)
- Biggest defeat: 1–3 (vs. Fatih Karagümrük (A), 1 October 2021, Süper Lig)

The 2021–22 season was the 32nd season in the existence of İstanbul Başakşehir and the club's eighth consecutive season in the top flight of Turkish football. In addition to the domestic league, İstanbul Başakşehir participated in this season's edition of the Turkish Cup.

== Kits ==
İstanbul Başakşehir's 2021–22 home and away kits, manufactured by Bilcee, released on 11 August 2021 and were up for sale on the same day. The third jersey was introduced separately on 3 September 2021, in a special screening.

- Supplier: Bilcee
- Main sponsor: Decovita
- Back sponsor: Aksa
- Sleeve sponsor: Jakamen, HDI Sigorta
- Short sponsor: YKT Filo Kiralama
- Socks sponsor: HDI Sigorta

== Players ==
=== First-team squad ===
As of 8 February 2022

Note: Flags indicate national team as defined under FIFA eligibility rules; some limited exceptions apply. Players may hold more than one non-FIFA nationality.

No.	Pos.	Nation	Player
1	GK	TUR	Volkan Babacan (Third captain)
3	DF	TUR	Hasan Ali Kaldırım
4	DF	TUR	Ravil Tagir
5	DF	BRA	Léo Duarte (on loan from Milan)
6	DF	MDA	Alexandru Epureanu (Vice-captain)
8	MF	SRB	Danijel Aleksić
10	MF	TUR	Berkay Özcan
11	MF	BEL	Nacer Chadli
13	GK	TUR	Ahmet Kıvanç
14	FW	TUR	Serdar Gürler
16	GK	TUR	Muhammed Şengezer
19	DF	TUR	Şener Özbayraklı
20	MF	POR	Pizzi (on loan from Benfica)
21	MF	TUR	Mahmut Tekdemir (Captain)

No.	Pos.	Nation	Player
22	FW	NOR	Fredrik Gulbrandsen
23	MF	TUR	Deniz Türüç
27	MF	EGY	Trézéguet (on loan from Aston Villa)
28	MF	TUR	Tolga Ciğerci
42	MF	TUR	Ömer Ali Şahiner
48	MF	TUR	Salih Uçan (on loan from Beşiktaş)
50	MF	TUR	Metin Emre Karaal
52	MF	TUR	Emre Çolak
55	MF	BDI	Youssouf Ndayishimiye
60	DF	BRA	Lucas Lima
77	FW	ITA	Stefano Okaka
80	DF	BRA	Júnior Caiçara
98	GK	TUR	Deniz Dilmen
99	FW	TUR	Atabey Çiçek

=== Out on loan ===
Note: Flags indicate national team as defined under FIFA eligibility rules; some limited exceptions apply. Players may hold more than one non-FIFA nationality.

No.	Pos.	Nation	Player
—	DF	AZE	Mert Çelik (at Neftçi Baku)
—	DF	TUR	Mustafa Kutay Pekşen (at Bayrampaşa)
—	DF	TUR	Muhammed Sarikaya (at Yeni Malatyaspor)
—	DF	TUR	Cemali Sertel (at Çaykur Rizespor)
—	MF	NGR	Azubuike Okechukwu (at Sivasspor)

No.	Pos.	Nation	Player
—	MF	TUR	Salim Farsak (at Alanya Kestelspor)
—	MF	TUR	Soner Aydoğdu (at Göztepe)
—	FW	TUR	Muhammet Arslantaş (at Belediye Kütahyaspor)
—	FW	FRA	Enzo Crivelli (at Saint-Étienne)

== Pre-season and friendlies ==
Win Draw Loss

24 July 2021 Friendly	Trabzonspor (Turkey)	0–0	(Turkey) İstanbul Başakşehir	Istanbul, Turkey
19:00 TRT (UTC+3)		Report		Stadium: Hasan Doğan National Team's Camp and Training Facilities

27 July 2021 Friendly	Beşiktaş (Turkey)	1–0	(Turkey) İstanbul Başakşehir	Istanbul, Turkey
19:00 TRT (UTC+3)	Yalçın 48'	Report		Stadium: BJK Nevzat Demir Facilities

31 July 2021 Friendly	Kasımpaşa (Turkey)	1–2	(Turkey) İstanbul Başakşehir	Istanbul, Turkey
19:00 TRT (UTC+3)		Report		Stadium: Kasımpaşa Kemerburgaz Facilities

3 August 2021 Friendly	İstanbul Başakşehir (Turkey)	2–2	(Turkey) Hatayspor	Istanbul, Turkey
19:00 TRT (UTC+3)		Report		Stadium: Başakşehir Fatih Terim Stadium

6 August 2021 Friendly	İstanbul Başakşehir (Turkey)	0–0	(Turkey) Yeni Malatyaspor	Istanbul, Turkey
19:00 TRT (UTC+3)		Report		Stadium: Başakşehir Fatih Terim Stadium

29 January 2022 Friendly	İstanbul Başakşehir (Turkey)	1–0	(Serbia) Partizan	Antalya, Turkey
15:00 TRT (UTC+3)	Epureanu 44'	Report		Stadium: Maxx Royal Hotel - Field A

27 March 2022 Friendly	İstanbul Başakşehir (Turkey)	1–2	(Ukraine) Metalist Kharkiv	Antalya, Turkey
17:00 TRT (UTC+3)	Pizzi 49'	Report	Fomin 54', 77'	Stadium: Maxx Royal Hotel - Field A

== Competitions ==
=== Overall record ===
Competition	First match	Last match	Starting round	Final position	Record							
Competition	First match	Last match	Starting round	Final position	Pld	W	D	L	GF	GA	GD	Win %
Süper Lig	15 August 2021	22 May 2022	Matchday 1	4th	38	19	8	11	56	36	+20	50.00
Turkish Cup	30 November 2021		Fourth round	Fourth round	1	0	1	0	1	1	+0	0.00
Total					39	19	9	11	57	37	+20	48.72

Source: Soccerway

=== Süper Lig ===
==== League table ====
Pos	Team	Pld	W	D	L	GF	GA	GD	Pts	Qualification or relegation
2	Fenerbahçe	38	21	10	7	73	38	+35	73	Qualification for the Champions League second qualifying round
3	Konyaspor	38	20	8	10	66	45	+21	68	Qualification for the Europa Conference League second qualifying round
4	Başakşehir	38	19	8	11	56	36	+20	65	Qualification for the Europa Conference League second qualifying round
5	Alanyaspor	38	19	7	12	67	58	+9	64	
6	Beşiktaş	38	15	14	9	56	48	+8	59 (Note: Beşiktaş finished ahead of Antalyaspor on head-to-head points: Antalyaspor 2–3 Beşiktaş, Beşiktaş 0–0 Antalyaspor.)	

Source: Süper Lig
Rules for classification: 1) Points; 2) Head-to-head points; 3) Head-to-head goal difference; 4) Head-to-head goals scored; 5) Goal difference; 6) Goals scored; 7) Play-off.

==== Results summary ====
Overall								Home						Away					
Pld	W	D	L	GF	GA	GD	Pts	W	D	L	GF	GA	GD	W	D	L	GF	GA	GD
34	17	6	11	49	32	+17	57	11	1	5	27	14	+13	6	5	6	22	18	+4

Last updated: 24 April 2022.
Source: Soccerway

==== Results by matchday ====
Round	1	2	3	4	5	6	7	8	9	10	11	12	13	14	15	16	17	18	19	20	21	22	23	24	25	26	27	28	29	30	31	32	33	34	35	36	37	38
Ground	A	H	A	H	A	A	H	A	H	A	H	A	H	H	A	H	A	H	A	A	H	A	H	A	H	A	H	A	H	A	H	A	A	H	A	H	A	H
Result	L	L	L	L	W	L	W	L	W	W	W	W	W	D	W	W	D	W	D	D	W	L	L	W	W	W	L	D	L	L	W	W	D	W				
Position	15	18	19	19	18	18	15	15	14	11	10	9	7	6	5	4	3	3	3	3	3	3	5	4	3	3	3	3	4	6	5	4	4	4				

Updated to match(es) played on 24 April 2022. Source: Soccerway
A = Away; H = Home; W = Win; D = Draw; L = Loss

==== Matches ====
15 August 2021 1	İstanbul Başakşehir	0–1	Alanyaspor	Istanbul
19:15 TRT (UTC+3)		Report	Borja 12'; Davidson (yellow card) 30'; Siopis (yellow card) 64'	Stadium: Başakşehir Fatih Terim Stadium; Attendance: 290; Referee: Yaşar Kemal Uğurlu

22 August 2021 2	Konyaspor	2–1	İstanbul Başakşehir	Konya
19:15 TRT (UTC+3)	Çekiçi 51'; Cikalleshi 87', (yellow card) 88'	Report	Ndayishimiye 45+1'	Stadium: Konya Metropolitan Municipality Stadium; Attendance: 1,548; Referee: Halis Özkahya

28 August 2021 3	İstanbul Başakşehir	0–1	Kayserispor	Istanbul
19:15 TRT (UTC+3)	Lucas Lima (yellow card) 37'; Gulbrandsen (yellow card) 45+1'; Şahiner (yellow card) 65'	Report	Thiam 4'; Demirok (yellow card) 53'	Stadium: Başakşehir Fatih Terim Stadium; Attendance: 221; Referee: Mustafa Öğretmenoğlu

12 September 2021 4	Göztepe	2–1	İstanbul Başakşehir	İzmir
20:00 TRT (UTC+3)	Emir (yellow card) 24'; Ndiaye 64'; Nwobodo (yellow card) 75'; Tijanić 83'; Akbunar (yellow card) 90+3'; Eğribayat (yellow card) 90+4'	Report	Türüç 7', (yellow card) 90+3'; Ciğerci (yellow card) 11'; Şahiner (yellow card) 24'	Stadium: Gürsel Aksel Stadium; Attendance: 4,003; Referee: Tugay Kaan Numanoğlu

19 September 2021 5	İstanbul Başakşehir	2–0	Fenerbahçe	Istanbul
19:00 TRT (UTC+3)	Okaka 16'; Gulbrandsen 90'	Report	Luiz Gustavo (yellow card) 83'	Stadium: Başakşehir Fatih Terim Stadium; Attendance: 1,813; Referee: Fırat Aydınus

22 September 2021 6	Gaziantep	1–0	İstanbul Başakşehir	Gaziantep
17:00 TRT (UTC+3)	Demir 1'; Merkel (yellow card) 7'; Niyaz (yellow card) 30'	Report	Ponck (yellow card) 90+1'	Stadium: New Gaziantep Stadium; Attendance: 1,488; Referee: Mete Kalkavan

26 September 2021 7	İstanbul Başakşehir	3–0	Çaykur Rizespor	Istanbul
16:00 TRT (UTC+3)	Okaka 25', 55', 75'	Report		Stadium: Başakşehir Fatih Terim Stadium; Attendance: 361; Referee: Arda Kardeşler

1 October 2021 8	Fatih Karagümrük	3–1	İstanbul Başakşehir	Istanbul
20:00 TRT (UTC+3)	Bertolacci 19', 30'; Balkovec 37'	Report	Lucas Lima (yellow card) 35'; Ponck (yellow card) 64'; Tekdemir (yellow card) 83'; Aleksić 84'	Stadium: Atatürk Olympic Stadium; Attendance: 233; Referee: Erkan Özdamar

15 October 2021 9	İstanbul Başakşehir	3–2	Beşiktaş	Istanbul
20:00 TRT (UTC+3)	Okaka 40', 83'; Tekdemir (yellow card) 55'; Babacan (yellow card) 76'; Gulbrandsen 85'	Report	Rosier (yellow card) 45+1'; Teixeira 59'; Uysal (yellow card) 70'; Batshuayi 90+1' (pen.)	Stadium: Başakşehir Fatih Terim Stadium; Attendance: 2,609; Referee: Atilla Karaoğlan

24 October 2021 10	Antalyaspor	1–2	İstanbul Başakşehir	Antalya
16:00 TRT (UTC+3)	Ghacha 90+5'	Report	Özcan 32', 56'; Caiçara (yellow card) 79'	Stadium: Antalya Stadium; Attendance: 4,072; Referee: Yaşar Kemal Uğurlu

1 November 2021 11	İstanbul Başakşehir	2–1	Adana Demirspor	Istanbul
20:00 TRT (UTC+3)	Kaldırım (yellow card) 41'; Chadli 71'; Višća 90+2' (pen.)	Report	Assombalonga 60'; Inler (yellow card) 90+7'	Stadium: Başakşehir Fatih Terim Stadium; Attendance: 927; Referee: Arda Kardeşler

6 November 2021 12	Yeni Malatyaspor	1–3	İstanbul Başakşehir	Malatya
16:00 TRT (UTC+3)	Ndong (yellow card) 45+2'; Büyük (yellow card) 45+2'; Tetteh (yellow card) 67'; Kanatsızkuş 90+2'	Report	Ciğerci 39'; Višća 59', (yellow card) 63'; Okaka 61'	Stadium: New Malatya Stadium; Attendance: 2,432; Referee: Zorbay Küçük

20 November 2021 13	İstanbul Başakşehir	2–1	Sivasspor	Istanbul
16:00 TRT (UTC+3)	Gulbrandsen 17'; Tekdemir 24'; Şahiner (yellow card) 43'; Ciğerci (yellow card) 74'; Chadli (yellow card) 78'; Duarte (yellow card) 90+2'; Okaka (yellow card) 90+6'	Report	Pedro Henrique 21' (pen.); Goutas (yellow card) 71'; Kesgin (yellow card) 89'	Stadium: Başakşehir Fatih Terim Stadium; Attendance: 827; Referee: Mete Kalkavan

26 November 2021 14	İstanbul Başakşehir	0–0	Altay	Istanbul
20:00 TRT (UTC+3)	Aleksić (yellow card) 49'; Ndayishimiye (yellow card) 90+8'	Report	Thiam (yellow card) 71'; Yıldırım (yellow card) 81'	Stadium: Başakşehir Fatih Terim Stadium; Attendance: 689; Referee: Ümit Öztürk

5 December 2021 15	Hatayspor	0–3	İstanbul Başakşehir	Hatay
16:00 TRT (UTC+3)	Falette (yellow card) 26'; Traoré (yellow card) 29'	Report	Aleksić 8' (pen.), 27' (pen.); Okaka 45+4'	Stadium: New Hatay Stadium; Attendance: 6,004; Referee: Erkan Özdamar

11 December 2021 16	İstanbul Başakşehir	2–1	Kasımpaşa	Istanbul
16:00 TRT (UTC+3)	Duarte (yellow card) 45'; Višća 53'; Tekdemir (yellow card) 85', (goal) 90+2'	Report	Trávník (yellow card) 76'; Hajradinović 78', (yellow card) 84'; Haspolat (yellow card) 90+7'	Stadium: Başakşehir Fatih Terim Stadium; Attendance: 672; Referee: Fırat Aydınus

18 December 2021 17	Galatasaray	1–1	İstanbul Başakşehir	Istanbul
19:00 TRT (UTC+3)	Aktürkoğlu (yellow card) 21'; Marcão (yellow card) 23'; Yedlin (yellow card) 30'; Mohamed 90+1'; Cicâldău (yellow card) 90+6'	Report	Okaka 7', (yellow card) 90+5'; Chadli (yellow card) 35'; Ndayishimiye (yellow card) 87'; Gulbrandsen (yellow card) 90+1'; Duarte (yellow card) 90+4' (yellow-red card) 90+5'; Şengezer (yellow card) 90+7'	Stadium: Nef Stadium; Attendance: 15,204; Referee: Zorbay Küçük

21 December 2021 18	İstanbul Başakşehir	3–1	Giresunspor	Istanbul
17:00 TRT (UTC+3)	Türüç 17'; Caiçara 69'; Şahiner (yellow card) 74'; Višća 78'	Report	Diarra 28'; Traoré (yellow card) 45+1'	Stadium: Başakşehir Fatih Terim Stadium; Attendance: 631; Referee: Alper Ulusoy

25 December 2021 19	Trabzonspor	0–0	İstanbul Başakşehir	Trabzon
19:00 TRT (UTC+3)	Türkmen (yellow card) 32'	Report	Ndayishimiye (yellow card) 45'; Okaka (yellow card) 89'	Stadium: Şenol Güneş Sports Complex; Attendance: 36,148; Referee: Halil Umut Meler

8 January 2022 20	Alanyaspor	1–1	İstanbul Başakşehir	Antalya
16:00 TRT (UTC+3)	Babacar 13'; Güneş (red card) 55'; Akbaba (yellow card) 66'; Bekiroğlu (yellow card) 72'	Report	Kaldırım (yellow card) 37'; Şahiner (yellow card) 38' (yellow-red card) 41'; Caiçara 45'; Gulbrandsen (yellow card) 89'	Stadium: Bahçeşehir Okulları Stadium; Attendance: 1,252; Referee: Mustafa Kürşad Filiz

22 February 2022 21	İstanbul Başakşehir	2–1	Konyaspor	Istanbul
20:00 TRT (UTC+3)	Ciğerci (yellow card) 18'; Kaldırım (yellow card) 45+1'; Gulbrandsen 49'; Çağıran 62' (o.g.)	Report	Hadžiahmetović (yellow card) 10'; Bytyqi 37'	Stadium: Başakşehir Fatih Terim Stadium; Attendance: No data Referee: Sarper Barış Saka

19 January 2022 22	Kayserispor	1–0	İstanbul Başakşehir	Kayseri
18:00 TRT (UTC+3)	Akdağ (yellow card) 62'; Demirok 73'; Parmak (yellow card) 87'	Report	Türüç (yellow card) 61'; Ciğerci (yellow card) 72'; Epureanu (yellow card) 81'	Stadium: Kadir Has Stadium; Attendance: 2,484; Referee: Mete Kalkavan

22 January 2022 23	İstanbul Başakşehir	1–2	Göztepe	Istanbul
19:00 TRT (UTC+3)	Duarte (yellow card) 45'; Aleksić 90+5'	Report	Ndiaye 38'; Ángel (yellow card) 41'; Akbunar 87'	Stadium: Başakşehir Fatih Terim Stadium; Attendance: 401; Referee: Arda Kardeşler

5 February 2022 24	Fenerbahçe	0–1	İstanbul Başakşehir	Istanbul
19:00 TRT (UTC+3)	Crespo (yellow card) 24'; Özer (yellow card) 38'; Berisha (yellow card) 72'	Report	Türüç (yellow card) 39'; Ciğerci (yellow card) 51'; Özcan 61', (yellow card) 75'; Duarte (yellow card) 70'	Stadium: Şükrü Saracoğlu Stadium; Attendance: 18,560; Referee: Yaşar Kemal Uğurlu

12 February 2022 25	İstanbul Başakşehir	2–0	Gaziantep	Istanbul
16:00 TRT (UTC+3)	Pizzi 34'; Caiçara (yellow card) 40'; Gürler 87'	Report	Mendyl (yellow card) 61'	Stadium: Başakşehir Fatih Terim Stadium; Attendance: 535; Referee: Cüneyt Çakır

18 February 2022 26	Çaykur Rizespor	0–2	İstanbul Başakşehir	Rize
20:00 TRT (UTC+3)	Fernandes (yellow card) 38'; Baiano (yellow card) 56'	Report	Trézéguet 33', 52'; Okaka (yellow card) 45+1'; Duarte (yellow card) 45+3'; Uçan (yellow card) 83'; Türüç (yellow card) 90+3'	Stadium: Çaykur Didi Stadium; Attendance: 3,729; Referee: Suat Arslanboğa

26 February 2022 27	İstanbul Başakşehir	1–2	Fatih Karagümrük	Istanbul
16:00 TRT (UTC+3)	Trézéguet 25'; Uçan (yellow card) 72'; Okaka (yellow card) 80'	Report	Borini 39'; Musa 41'; Erkin (yellow card) 54'; Mercan (yellow card) 88'	Stadium: Başakşehir Fatih Terim Stadium; Attendance: 772; Referee: Yasin Kol

7 March 2022 28	Beşiktaş	2–2	İstanbul Başakşehir	Istanbul
20:00 TRT (UTC+3)	Yalçın 41', (yellow card) 70'; Karaman 54'; Saatçı (yellow card) 79'; Rosier (yellow card) 82'	Report	Trézéguet 35', (yellow card) 79'; Okaka 45+4'; Gürler (yellow card) 51'; Caiçara (yellow card) 63'	Stadium: Vodafone Park; Attendance: 20,161; Referee: Erkan Özdamar

14 March 2022 29	İstanbul Başakşehir	0–1	Antalyaspor	Istanbul
16:00 TRT (UTC+3)	Caiçara (yellow card) 37'; Şahiner (yellow card) 53'; Okaka (yellow card) 60'	Report	Wright 20'	Stadium: Başakşehir Fatih Terim Stadium; Attendance: 383; Referee: Zorbay Küçük

19 March 2022 30	Adana Demirspor	2–1	İstanbul Başakşehir	Adana
16:00 TRT (UTC+3)	Sanuç 38'; Akgün (yellow card) 45+3'; Balotelli (yellow card) 74'; Bjarnason 80'	Report	Ndayishimiye (yellow card) 28'; Aleksić 48'; Ciğerci (yellow card) 86'	Stadium: New Adana Stadium; Attendance: 14,670; Referee: Yaşar Kemal Uğurlu

4 April 2022 31	İstanbul Başakşehir	1–0	Yeni Malatyaspor	Istanbul
20:30 TRT (UTC+3)	Aleksić 26'	Report	Tetteh (yellow card) 65'	Stadium: Başakşehir Fatih Terim Stadium; Attendance: 557; Referee: Sarper Barış Saka

10 April 2022 32	Sivasspor	0–2	İstanbul Başakşehir	Sivas
16:00 TRT (UTC+3)	Çiftçi (yellow card) 38'; Oğuz (yellow card) 66'	Report	Goutas 3' (o.g.); Tekdemir (yellow card) 28'; Caiçara (yellow card) 54'; Türüç 60'; Epureanu (yellow card) 90+2'	Stadium: New Sivas 4 Eylül Stadium; Attendance: 3,909; Referee: Halil Umut Meler

16 April 2022 33	Altay	1–1	İstanbul Başakşehir	İzmir
16:00 TRT (UTC+3)	Yıldırım (yellow card) 21'; Gülselam 89'; Karataş (yellow card) 90+3'	Report	Trézéguet 40'; Türüç (yellow card) 56'	Stadium: Alsancak Mustafa Denizli Stadium; Attendance: 4,814; Referee: Sarper Barış Saka

24 April 2022 34	İstanbul Başakşehir	3–0	Hatayspor	Istanbul
16:00 TRT (UTC+3)	Epureanu (yellow card) 36'; Türüç 65', 88'; Tekdemir 77'	Report	Sackey (yellow card) 87'	Stadium: Başakşehir Fatih Terim Stadium; Referee: Arda Kardeşler

30 April 2022 35	Kasımpaşa	2–3	İstanbul Başakşehir	Istanbul
16:00 TRT (UTC+3)		Report		Stadium: Recep Tayyip Erdoğan Stadium

7 May 2022 36	İstanbul Başakşehir	0–0	Galatasaray	Istanbul
--:-- TRT (UTC+3)		Report		Stadium: Başakşehir Fatih Terim Stadium

15 May 2022 37	Giresunspor	1–1	İstanbul Başakşehir	Giresun
--:-- TRT (UTC+3)		Report		Stadium: Çotanak Sports Complex

22 May 2022 38	İstanbul Başakşehir	3–1	Trabzonspor	Istanbul
--:-- TRT (UTC+3)		Report		Stadium: Başakşehir Fatih Terim Stadium

=== Turkish Cup ===
30 November 2021 Fourth round	İstanbul Başakşehir	1–1 (a.e.t.) (1–3 p)	Bodrumspor	Istanbul
17:00 TRT (UTC+3)	Kutucu 24'; Ndayishimiye (yellow card) 78' (yellow-red card) 97'; Karaal (yellow card) 96'; Şengezer (yellow card) 97'	Report	Bingöl 44'; Çayir (yellow card) 97'; Tarım (yellow card) 104'; Doğan (yellow card) 105+1'	Stadium: Başakşehir Fatih Terim Stadium; Referee: Abdullah Buğra Taşkınsoy
	Penalties
	Višća (penalty missed); Aleksić (penalty missed); Lucas Lima (penalty scored); Epureanu (penalty missed)		(penalty scored) Yatağan; (penalty scored) Güneş; (penalty missed) Çayir; (penalty scored) Imeri

== Statistics ==
=== Goalscorers ===
As of 24 April 2022

Rank	No.	Pos	Nat	Name	Süper Lig	Turkish Cup	Total
1	77	FW	(Italy)	Stefano Okaka	10	0	10
2	8	MF	(Serbia)	Danijel Aleksić	6	0	6
3	23	MF	(Turkey)	Deniz Türüç	5	0	5
3	27	FW	(Egypt)	Trézéguet	5	0	5
5	7	MF	(Bosnia and Herzegovina)	Edin Višća	4	0	4
5	22	FW	(Norway)	Fredrik Gulbrandsen	4	0	4
7	10	MF	(Turkey)	Berkay Özcan	3	0	3
7	21	MF	(Turkey)	Mahmut Tekdemir	3	0	3
9	80	DF	(Brazil)	Júnior Caiçara	2	0	2
10	11	MF	(Belgium)	Nacer Chadli	1	0	1
10	17	FW	(Turkey)	Ahmed Kutucu	0	1	1
10	20	MF	(Portugal)	Pizzi	1	0	1
10	28	MF	(Turkey)	Tolga Ciğerci	1	0	1
10	55	MF	(Burundi)	Youssouf Ndayishimiye	1	0	1
Own goals					2	0	2
Totals					48	1	49
