= 2019–20 İstanbul Başakşehir F.K. season =

İstanbul Başakşehir
2019–20 season
- President: Göksel Gümüşdağ
- Head coach: Okan Buruk
- Stadium: Başakşehir Fatih Terim Stadium
- Süper Lig: 1st
- Turkish Cup: Round of 16
- UEFA Champions League: Third qualifying round
- UEFA Europa League: Round of 16
- Top goalscorer: League: Demba Ba (13); All: Edin Višća (20)
Home colours	Away colours	Third colours

The 2019–20 season was the 6th consecutive season of İstanbul Başakşehir in the Süper Lig and their 30th year in existence. The season was slated to cover a period from 1 July 2019 to 30 June 2020. It was extended extraordinarily beyond 30 June due to the COVID-19 pandemic in Turkey.

On 19 July 2020, Başakşehir were crowned champions of the Turkish Süper Lig for the first time in the club's history. They also became only the sixth club in the competition's history to win the league title.

== Players ==
=== Current squad ===
As of 23 September 2019.

Note: Flags indicate national team as defined under FIFA eligibility rules; some limited exceptions apply. Players may hold more than one non-FIFA nationality.

No.	Pos.	Nation	Player
1	GK	TUR	Volkan Babacan
3	DF	FRA	Gaël Clichy
5	MF	TUR	Mehmet Topal
6	DF	MDA	Alexandru Epureanu
7	MF	BIH	Edin Višća (Vice-captain)
9	FW	NOR	Fredrik Gulbrandsen
11	MF	NED	Eljero Elia
13	GK	TUR	Ahmet Kıvanç
17	MF	TUR	İrfan Can Kahveci
18	FW	TUR	Muhammet Arslantaş
19	FW	SEN	Demba Ba
21	MF	TUR	Mahmut Tekdemir (Captain)
23	DF	AUS	Aziz Behich
24	DF	POR	Miguel Vieira

No.	Pos.	Nation	Player
26	DF	CPV	Carlos Ponck
27	FW	FRA	Enzo Crivelli
29	MF	TUR	Kerim Frei
33	DF	TUR	Uğur Uçar
34	GK	TUR	Mert Günok
37	DF	SVK	Martin Škrtel
41	MF	TUR	Berkay Özcan (on loan from Hamburger SV)
44	MF	NGR	Azubuike Okechukwu (on loan from Pyramids FC)
53	GK	TUR	Onur Güney
70	FW	BRA	Robinho
80	DF	BRA	Júnior Caiçara
88	MF	SUI	Gökhan Inler
91	MF	SRB	Danijel Aleksić

=== Out on loan ===
Note: Flags indicate national team as defined under FIFA eligibility rules; some limited exceptions apply. Players may hold more than one non-FIFA nationality.

No.	Pos.	Nation	Player
4	DF	GHA	Joseph Attamah (at Çaykur Rizespor)
14	FW	TUR	Muhammet Demir (at Gazişehir Gaziantep)
16	GK	TUR	Muhammed Şengezer (at Adana Demirspor)
20	MF	TUR	Soner Aydoğdu (at Göztepe)
25	DF	TUR	Furkan Soyalp (at Gazişehir Gaziantep)
—	MF	TUR	Doğanay Kılıç (at Kastamonuspor)
—	MF	TUR	Alican Özfesli (at Hatayspor)

No.	Pos.	Nation	Player
—	DF	TUR	Berk Nebioğlu (at Yomraspor)
—	DF	TUR	Muharrem Öner (at Ümraniyespor)
—	MF	TUR	Salim Farsak (at Pendikspor)
—	MF	TUR	Cerem Dinçer (at Kahramanmaraşspor)
—	FW	TUR	Atabey Çiçek (at Samsunspor)
—	FW	TUR	Yusuf Avcılar (at Aksaray Belediyespor)

== Pre-season and friendlies ==
Win Draw Loss

11 July 2019 Friendly	USK Anif (Austria)	1–4	(Turkey) İstanbul Başakşehir	Anif, Austria
18:30 CEST (UTC+2)	Gruber 90'	Report	Robinho 27'; Ba 42'; Napoleoni 57' (pen.); Soyalp 66' (pen.)	Stadium: Sportzentrum Anif

14 July 2019 Friendly	Ajax (Netherlands)	2–1	(Turkey) İstanbul Başakşehir	Bramberg, Austria
18:00 CEST (UTC+2)	Dolberg 28'; Huntelaar 71'	Report	Frei 76'	Stadium: Sportplatz Bramberg

17 July 2019 Friendly	Borussia Mönchengladbach (Germany)	5–1	(Turkey) İstanbul Başakşehir	Kufstein, Austria
18:00 CEST (UTC+2)	Lainer 8'; Bénes 29'; Cuisance 42'; Italiano 47'; Raffael 85'		Erdinç 22'	Stadium: Kufstein-Arena; Referee: Walter Altmann (Austria)

20 July 2019 Friendly	Fortuna Düsseldorf (Germany)	1–1	(Turkey) İstanbul Başakşehir	Leogang, Austria
15:00 CEST (UTC+2)	Karaman 73'		Gulbrandsen 25'	Stadium: Steinbergstadion

31 July 2019 Friendly	AEK Athens (Greece)	0–0	(Turkey) İstanbul Başakşehir	Athens, Greece
20:30 EEST (UTC+3)		Report		Stadium: Olympic Stadium

16 November 2019 Friendly	İstanbul Başakşehir (Turkey)	2–1	(Turkey) Fatih Karagümrük	Başakşehir, Turkey
14:00 TRT (UTC+3)	Ba 32', 78'	Report	Sosseh 24'	Stadium: Başakşehir 3 Nolu Saha

9 January 2020 Friendly	İstanbul Başakşehir (Turkey)	0–3	(Netherlands) Fortuna Sittard	Belek, Turkey
17:00 TRT (UTC+3)		Report	Niňaj 4'; Ciss 46'; Passlack (yellow card) 51'; Diemers 54'	Stadium: Maxx Royal Hotel Field A

11 January 2020 Friendly	İstanbul Başakşehir (Turkey)	3–1	(Switzerland) Young Boys	Belek, Turkey
17:00 TRT (UTC+3)	Ba 10', 14'; Višća 70'	Report	Ngamaleu 90' (pen.)	Stadium: Maxx Royal Hotel Field A

== Competitions ==
Win Draw Loss

=== Overview ===
Competition	First match	Last match	Starting round	Final position	Record							
Competition	First match	Last match	Starting round	Final position	Pld	W	D	L	GF	GA	GD	Win %
Süper Lig	18 August 2019	26 July 2020	Matchday 1	Winners	34	20	9	5	65	34	+31	58.82
Turkish Cup	4 December 2019	21 January 2020	Fifth Round	Round of 16	4	2	2	0	4	1	+3	50.00
Champions League	7 August 2019	13 August 2019	Third qualifying round	Third qualifying round	2	0	0	2	0	3	−3	0.00
Europa League	19 September 2019	5 August 2020	Group stage	Round of 16	10	5	1	4	13	16	−3	50.00
Total					50	27	12	11	82	54	+28	54.00

Source: Soccerway

=== Süper Lig ===
==== League table ====
Pos	Team	Pld	W	D	L	GF	GA	GD	Pts	Qualification or relegation
1	Başakşehir (C)	34	20	9	5	65	34	+31	69	Qualification for the Champions League group stage
2	Trabzonspor (Note: Trabzonspor were banned for 1 season from all UEFA club competitions for either the 2020–21 or 2021–22 seasons by the UEFA Club Financial Control Body on 3 June 2020 due to breaches of the UEFA Financial Fair Play Regulations.)	34	18	11	5	76	42	+34	65	
3	Beşiktaş	34	19	5	10	59	40	+19	62	Qualification for the Champions League second qualifying round
4	Sivasspor	34	17	9	8	55	38	+17	60	Qualification for the Europa League group stage
5	Alanyaspor	34	16	9	9	61	37	+24	57	Qualification for the Europa League third qualifying round

Source: Süper Lig, Soccerway
Rules for classification: 1) Points; 2) Head-to-head points; 3) Head-to-head goal difference; 4) Head-to-head goals scored; 5) Goal difference; 6) Goals scored; 7) Play-off.
(C) Champions

==== Results summary ====
Overall								Home						Away					
Pld	W	D	L	GF	GA	GD	Pts	W	D	L	GF	GA	GD	W	D	L	GF	GA	GD
34	20	9	5	65	34	+31	69	12	4	1	38	13	+25	8	5	4	27	21	+6

Source: Süper Lig

==== Result round by round ====
Round	1	2	3	4	5	6	7	8	9	10	11	12	13	14	15	16	17	18	19	20	21	22	23	24	25	26	27	28	29	30	31	32	33	34
Ground	A	H	A	H	A	H	A	H	H	A	H	A	H	A	H	A	H	H	A	H	A	H	A	H	A	A	H	A	H	A	H	A	H	A
Result	L	L	W	D	D	W	W	W	D	D	W	W	W	D	D	W	W	W	L	W	D	W	W	W	W	D	W	W	D	W	W	L	W	L
Position	14	17	14	14	12	8	6	4	6	6	5	3	2	4	2	2	2	2	3	3	3	2	1	1	1	2	2	1	1	1	1	1	1	1

Source: Süper Lig
A = Away; H = Home; W = Win; D = Draw; L = Loss

==== Matches ====
18 August 2019 1	Yeni Malatyaspor	3–0	İstanbul Başakşehir	Malatya
21:45 TRT (UTC+3)	Chaalali (yellow card) 45+1'; Yıldırım (yellow card) 48'; Yalçın (yellow card) 60'; Guilherme 68'; Jahović 87'; Fofana 90+2'	Report	Kahveci (yellow card) 59' (yellow-red card) 67'	Stadium: Malatya Arena; Referee: Hüseyin Göçek

24 August 2019 2	İstanbul Başakşehir	1–2	Fenerbahçe	Başakşehir
21:45 TRT (UTC+3)	Crivelli 32'	Report	Muriqi 77'; Dirar 90+3'	Stadium: Başakşehir Fatih Terim Stadium; Referee: Halil Umut Meler

1 September 2019 3	Gençlerbirliği	1–2	İstanbul Başakşehir	Eryaman
19:15 TRT (UTC+3)	Sio 36'; Baiano (yellow card) 42'; Özdemir (yellow card) 45+5'; Dikmen (yellow card) 78'; Touré (yellow card) 82'; Pehlivan (yellow card) 88'	Report	Crivelli (yellow card) 16'; Turan (yellow card) 45+2'; Ba 83' (pen.); Višća 90'	Stadium: Eryaman Stadium; Referee: Cüneyt Çakır

14 September 2019 4	İstanbul Başakşehir	1–1	Sivasspor	Başakşehir
17:00 TRT (UTC+3)	Tekdemir (yellow card) 22'; Višća 55'; Ba (yellow card) 62'	Report	Yatabaré 39'; Kılınç (yellow card) 42'; Çiftçi (yellow card) 88'	Stadium: Başakşehir Fatih Terim Stadium; Referee: Arda Kardeşler

23 September 2019 5	Beşiktaş	1–1	İstanbul Başakşehir	Istanbul
20:00 TRT (UTC+3)	Yılmaz (yellow card) 7', (goal) 84' (pen.); Ljajić (yellow card) 34'; Douglas (yellow card) 34'; Uysal (yellow card) 72'	Report	Tekdemir (yellow card) 8'; Uçar (yellow card) 45+2'; Crivelli (yellow card) 51', (goal) 54'; Epureanu (yellow card) 83'; Škrtel (yellow card) 89'	Stadium: Vodafone Park; Referee: Suat Arslanboga

27 September 2019 6	İstanbul Başakşehir	5–0	Çaykur Rizespor	Başakşehir
20:30 TRT (UTC+3)	Aleksić 19', 72'; Gulbrandsen 33'; Crivelli 87'; Kahveci 90'	Report	Melnjak (yellow card) 62'; Sasse (yellow card) 72'	Stadium: Başakşehir Fatih Terim Stadium; Referee: Fırat Aydınus

6 October 2019 7	Gaziantep	1–2	İstanbul Başakşehir	Gaziantep
19:00 TRT (UTC+3)	Vural (red card) 18'; Twumasi 24'; Kana-Biyik (yellow card) 87'	Report	Crivelli 13', 71'; Gulbrandsen (yellow card) 22'; Okechukwu (yellow card) 30'; Epureanu (yellow card) 44'; Elia (yellow card) 59'; Kahveci (yellow card) 66'; Ba (yellow card) 90+2'	Stadium: New Gaziantep Stadium; Referee: Koray Gençerler

19 October 2019 8	İstanbul Başakşehir	2–1	Göztepe	Başakşehir
17:30 TRT (UTC+3)	Gulbrandsen 11'; Inler (yellow card) 44'; Škrtel 90+1'	Report	Mossoró (yellow card) 42'; Öztürk (yellow card) 49'; Biyogo Poko (yellow card) 50'; Aydoğdu 64'	Stadium: Başakşehir Fatih Terim Stadium; Referee: Yasar Kemal Uğurlu

28 October 2019 9	İstanbul Başakşehir	2–2	Trabzonspor	Başakşehir
19:00 TRT (UTC+3)	Škrtel (yellow card) 59', (goal) 78'; Višća 67' (pen.); Tekdemir (yellow card) 71'	Report	Sturridge 61' (pen.); Çakır (yellow card) 65'; Nwakaeme (yellow card) 73'; Sørloth 90+5'; Sari (yellow card) 90+8'	Stadium: Başakşehir Fatih Terim Stadium; Referee: Ali Palabıyık

2 November 2019 10	Alanyaspor	0–0	İstanbul Başakşehir	Alanya
16:30 TRT (UTC+3)	N'Sakala (yellow card) 44'	Report	Crivelli (yellow card) 52'	Stadium: Bahçeşehir Okulları Stadium; Referee: Mete Kalkavan

10 November 2019 11	İstanbul Başakşehir	2–1	Ankaragücü	Başakşehir
18:00 TRT (UTC+3)	Crivelli 10', 77'; Turan (yellow card) 84'	Report	Kitsiou (yellow card) 39'; Sak (yellow card) 66'; Karabulut 87'	Stadium: Başakşehir Fatih Terim Stadium; Referee: Zorbay Kücük

22 November 2019 12	Galatasaray	0–1	İstanbul Başakşehir	Istanbul
19:30 TRT (UTC+3)	Babel (yellow card) 3'; Büyük (yellow card) 39'; Lemina (yellow card) 90+2'	Report	Kahveci (yellow card) 34'; Tekdemir (yellow card) 39'; Caiçara (yellow card) 47'; Gulbrandsen 78'	Stadium: Türk Telekom Stadium; Referee: Yaşar Kemal Uğurlu

1 December 2019 13	İstanbul Başakşehir	2–0	Antalyaspor	Başakşehir
16:30 TRT (UTC+3)	Crivelli (yellow card) 17'; Clichy 60'; Aleksić 63'	Report	Charles (yellow card) 15'; Diego Ângelo (yellow card) 59'; Čelůstka (yellow card) 79'	Stadium: Başakşehir Fatih Terim Stadium; Referee: Serkan Tokat

8 December 2019 14	Denizlispor	1–1	İstanbul Başakşehir	Denizli
16:30 TRT (UTC+3)	Sackey (yellow card) 27'; Murawski (yellow card) 43'; Yavru (yellow card) 44'; Barrow 60'	Report	Višća 54'; Aleksić (yellow card) 85'	Stadium: Denizli Atatürk Stadium; Referee: Alper Ulusoy

16 December 2019 15	İstanbul Başakşehir	1–1	Konyaspor	Başakşehir
20:00 TRT (UTC+3)	Ponck 26'	Report	Aničić (yellow card) 52'; Öztorun (yellow card) 58'; Milošević 63'; Skubic (yellow card) 90+3'	Stadium: Başakşehir Fatih Terim Stadium; Referee: Hüseyin Göçek

22 December 2019 16	Kayserispor	1–4	İstanbul Başakşehir	Kayseri
16:30 TRT (UTC+3)	Abdennour (yellow card) 28'; Kravets 38'; Dja Djédjé (yellow card) 49'; Lopes (yellow card) 64'	Report	Lopes 5' (o.g.); Kula 10' (o.g.); Ba 48'; Clichy (yellow card) 75'; Crivelli (yellow card) 81'; Aleksić 90+2'	Stadium: Kadir Has Stadium; Referee: Ali Sansalan

28 December 2019 17	İstanbul Başakşehir	5–1	Kasımpaşa	Başakşehir
17:30 TRT (UTC+3)	Ba 2', 28', (yellow card) 48'; Crivelli 6', (yellow card) 25'; Fernandes 26' (o.g.); Elia 63'	Report	Thiam (yellow card) 11'; Veigneau (yellow card) 34'; Quaresma 66' (pen.); Hajradinović (yellow card) 86'	Stadium: Başakşehir Fatih Terim Stadium; Referee: Atilla Karaoglan

18 January 2020 18	İstanbul Başakşehir	4–1	Yeni Malatyaspor	Başakşehir
17:00 TRT (UTC+3)	Višća 21'; Ba 26', (yellow card) 59'; Kahveci (yellow card) 31', (goal) 33'; Tekdemir 41'	Report	Thievy (yellow card) 35'; Acquah (yellow card) 45+2'; Jahović 63'; Yalçın (yellow card) 79'; Hadebe (yellow card) 84'	Stadium: Başakşehir Fatih Terim Stadium; Referee: Serkan Tokat

25 January 2020 19	Fenerbahçe	2–0	İstanbul Başakşehir	Istanbul
20:00 TRT (UTC+3)	Kruse 72'; Muriqi 86'	Report	Kahveci (yellow card) 65'	Stadium: Şükrü Saracoğlu Stadium; Referee: Fırat Aydınus

31 January 2020 20	İstanbul Başakşehir	3–1	Gençlerbirliği	Başakşehir
20:00 TRT (UTC+3)	Crivelli 8', (yellow card) 90'; Višća 48', 73'	Report	Ayité 29'; Baiano (yellow card) 47'	Stadium: Başakşehir Fatih Terim Stadium; Referee: Alper Ulusoy

9 February 2020 21	Sivasspor	1–1	İstanbul Başakşehir	Sivas
16:00 TRT (UTC+3)	Yatabaré 80'	Report	Ba 66'; Clichy (yellow card) 74'; Višća (yellow card) 78'; Kahveci (yellow card) 90+1'	Stadium: New Sivas 4 Eylül Stadium; Referee: Halis Özkahya

14 February 2020 22	İstanbul Başakşehir	1–0	Beşiktaş	Başakşehir
20:00 TRT (UTC+3)	Crivelli (yellow card) 19'; Tekdemir (yellow card) 45+1'; Ba 50'; Epureanu (yellow card) 86'	Report	Boateng (yellow card) 9'; Lens (yellow card) 51'; Boyd (yellow card) 85'	Stadium: Başakşehir Fatih Terim Stadium; Referee: Abdulkadir Bitigen

24 February 2020 23	Çaykur Rizespor	1–2	İstanbul Başakşehir	Rize
20:00 TRT (UTC+3)	Umar 60'	Report	Višća 43' (pen.); Aleksić (yellow card) 63'; Škrtel 90'	Stadium: Yeni Rize Şehir Stadium; Referee: Cüneyt Çakır

2 March 2020 24	İstanbul Başakşehir	3–1	Gaziantep	Başakşehir
20:00 TRT (UTC+3)	Škrtel (yellow card) 38'; Clichy 51'; Kahveci 63'; Ba 76'	Report	Özer 72'	Stadium: Başakşehir Fatih Terim Stadium; Referee: Zorbay Kücük

7 March 2020 25	Göztepe	0–3	İstanbul Başakşehir	Konak
17:00 TRT (UTC+3)	Aydoğdu (yellow card) 16'	Report	Epureanu (yellow card) 29' (red card) 83'; Ba 40'; Tekdemir (yellow card) 43'; Crivelli 57'; Kahveci 90+2'	Stadium: Gürsel Aksel Stadium; Referee: Ali Palabıyık

15 March 2020 26	Trabzonspor	1–1	İstanbul Başakşehir	Trabzon
16:00 TRT (UTC+3)	Škrtel 62' (o.g.); Campi (yellow card) 83'	Report	Ba 56'; Tekdemir (yellow card) 80'	Stadium: Şenol Güneş Stadium; Referee: Fırat Aydınus

13 June 2020 27	İstanbul Başakşehir	2–0	Alanyaspor	Başakşehir
18:30 TRT (UTC+3)	Crivelli (yellow card) 54'; Tekdemir 64'; Višća 79' (pen.)	Report	Gülselam (yellow card) 38'; Fernándes (yellow card) 41'; Tzavellas (yellow card) 72'	Stadium: Başakşehir Fatih Terim Stadium; Referee: Ali Sansalan

19 June 2020 28	Ankaragücü	1–2	İstanbul Başakşehir	Ankara
21:00 TRT (UTC+3)	Rodrigues 12' (pen.), (yellow card) 61'; Łukasik (yellow card) 40'; Faty (yellow card) 48'; Kitsiou (yellow card) 65'	Report	Škrtel (yellow card) 10'; Aleksić 59', (yellow card) 61'; Višća 73'; Crivelli (yellow card) 76'; Günok (yellow card) 90+1'	Stadium: Eryaman Stadium; Referee: Hüseyin Göçek

28 June 2020 29	İstanbul Başakşehir	1–1	Galatasaray	Başakşehir
21:00 TRT (UTC+3)	Aleksić (yellow card) 15', (goal) 51'; Tekdemir (yellow card) 41'; Kahveci (yellow card) 70'; Višća (yellow card) 74' (yellow-red card) 85'; Crivelli (yellow card) 88'; Gulbrandsen (yellow card) 90+1'	Report	Saracchi (yellow card) 8'; Akbaba 67'	Stadium: Başakşehir Fatih Terim Stadium; Referee: Ali Palabıyık

4 July 2020 30	Antalyaspor	0–2	İstanbul Başakşehir	Antalya
21:00 TRT (UTC+3)	Jahović (yellow card) 90+3'	Report	Epureanu (yellow card) 38'; Škrtel (yellow card) 51'; Ba 71'; Elia 90+7'	Stadium: Antalya Stadium; Referee: Yaşar Kemal Uğurlu

7 July 2020 31	İstanbul Başakşehir	2–0	Denizlispor	Başakşehir
21:00 TRT (UTC+3)	Clichy (yellow card) 29'; Ponck (yellow card) 42'; Crivelli 65'; Višća 78' (pen.); Topal (yellow card) 83'	Report	Bergdich (yellow card) 36'	Stadium: Başakşehir Fatih Terim Stadium; Referee: Abdulkadir Bitigen

13 July 2020 32	Konyaspor	4–3	İstanbul Başakşehir	Konya
21:00 TRT (UTC+3)	Miya (yellow card) 2', (goal) 20', 45+1'; Demirok (yellow card) 9'; Şahiner 27', (yellow card) 76'; Milošević (yellow card) 34'; Skubic 85'; Turan (yellow card) 90+6'	Report	Višća 3' (pen.), (yellow card) 30'; Aleksić (yellow card) 31'; Epureanu (yellow card) 49'; Ba 70'; Elia 76'	Stadium: Konya Büyükşehir Stadium; Referee: Cüneyt Çakır

19 July 2020 33	İstanbul Başakşehir	1–0	Kayserispor	Başakşehir
21:00 TRT (UTC+3)	Tekdemir 19'; Epureanu (yellow card) 30'; Elia (yellow card) 53'	Report		Stadium: Başakşehir Fatih Terim Stadium; Referee: Ali Şansalan

26 July 2020 34	Kasımpaşa	3–2	İstanbul Başakşehir	Istanbul
17:00 TRT (UTC+3)	Koita 8', 29'; Erdoğan 62'; Fernandes (yellow card) 86'	Report	Topal (yellow card) 29'; Elia (yellow card) 44'; Ba 78'; Višća 80'	Stadium: Recep Tayyip Erdoğan Stadium; Referee: Fırat Aydınus

=== Turkish Cup ===
==== Fifth round ====
4 December 2019 First leg	Hekimoğlu Trabzon	0–1	İstanbul Başakşehir	Trabzon
13:05 TRT (UTC+3)	Erol (yellow card) 55'	Report	Ba 5'; Vieira (yellow card) 29'; Aleksić (yellow card) 36'; Inler (yellow card) 90+5'	Stadium: Yavuz Selim Stadı; Referee: Erkan Özdamar

19 December 2019 Second leg	İstanbul Başakşehir	2–0 (3–0 agg.)	Hekimoğlu Trabzon	Başakşehir
16:30 TRT (UTC+3)	Robinho (yellow card) 28'; Ba 54'; Vieira (yellow card) 69'; Arslantaş 88' (pen.)	Report	Acer (yellow card) 87'	Stadium: Başakşehir Fatih Terim Stadium; Referee: Bahattin Şimşek

==== Round of 16 ====
14 January 2020 First leg	İstanbul Başakşehir	1–1	Kırklarelispor	Başakşehir
16:00 TRT (UTC+3)	Vieira (yellow card) 41'; Aleksić 80'; Crivelli (yellow card) 85'	Report	Balkı (yellow card) 66'; Ataç 90+2'	Stadium: Başakşehir Fatih Terim Stadium; Referee: Mustafa Öğretmenoğlu

21 January 2020 Second leg	Kırklarelispor	0–0 (1–1 (a) agg.)	İstanbul Başakşehir	Kırklareli
14:00 TRT (UTC+3)	Keleşoğlu (yellow card) 16'; Şişman (yellow card) 61'; Çiloğlu (yellow card) 81'; Karaahmet (yellow card) 86'; Ataç (yellow card) 90+4'	Report	Škrtel (yellow card) 11'; Aleksić (yellow card) 61'; Robinho (yellow card) 75'; Višća (yellow card) 90+3'	Stadium: Kırklareli Atatürk Stadium; Referee: Koray Gençerler

=== UEFA Champions League ===
==== Third qualifying round ====
7 August 2019 First leg	İstanbul Başakşehir (Turkey)	0–1	(Greece) Olympiacos	Istanbul, Turkey
19:45	Crivelli (yellow card) 2'; Višća (yellow card) 7'; Kahveci (yellow card) 21' (yellow-red card) 80'; Clichy (yellow card) 32'; Vieira (yellow card) 76'	Report	Tsimikas (yellow card) 36'; Gio. Masouras 53'; Valbuena (yellow card) 73'; Bruno (yellow card) 87'	Stadium: Başakşehir Fatih Terim Stadium; Attendance: 4,301; Referee: Orel Grinfeld (Israel)

13 August 2019 Second leg	Olympiacos (Greece)	2–0 (3–0 agg.)	(Turkey) İstanbul Başakşehir	Piraeus, Greece
21:30	Semedo 55', (yellow card) 59'; Elabdellaoui (yellow card) 70'; Valbuena 78' (pen.)	Report	Okechukwu (yellow card) 36'; Clichy (yellow card) 62'	Stadium: Karaiskakis Stadium; Attendance: 28,521; Referee: Bobby Madden (Scotland)

=== UEFA Europa League ===
==== Group stage ====
Pos	Team	Pld	W	D	L	GF	GA	GD	Pts	Qualification	IBS	ROM	MGB	WLB
1	(Turkey) İstanbul Başakşehir	6	3	1	2	7	9	−2	10	Advance to knockout phase	—	0–3	1–1	1–0
2	(Italy) Roma	6	2	3	1	12	6	+6	9	Advance to knockout phase	4–0	—	1–1	2–2
3	(Germany) Borussia Mönchengladbach	6	2	2	2	6	9	−3	8		1–2	2–1	—	0–4
4	(Austria) Wolfsberger AC	6	1	2	3	7	8	−1	5		0–3	1–1	0–1	—

Source: UEFA
Rules for classification: Group stage tiebreakers

19 September 2019 1	Roma (Italy)	4–0	(Turkey) İstanbul Başakşehir	Rome, Italy
21:00 CEST (UTC+2)	Júnior Caiçara 42' (o.g.); Džeko 58'; Juan Jesus (yellow card) 66'; Zaniolo 71'; Veretout (yellow card) 73'; Kluivert 90+3'	Report		Stadium: Stadio Olimpico; Attendance: 21,348; Referee: Xavier Estrada Fernández (Spain)

3 October 2019 2	İstanbul Başakşehir (Turkey)	1–1	(Germany) Borussia Mönchengladbach	Istanbul, Turkey
19:55 TRT (UTC+3)	Škrtel (yellow card) 14'; Caiçara (yellow card) 25'; Višća 55'; Gulbrandsen (yellow card) 86'	Report	Embolo (yellow card) 40'; Elvedi (yellow card) 53'; Kramer (yellow card) 64'; Herrmann (yellow card) 84', (goal) 90+1'	Stadium: Başakşehir Fatih Terim Stadium; Attendance: 6,000; Referee: Stuart Attwell (England)

24 October 2019 3	İstanbul Başakşehir (Turkey)	1–0	(Austria) Wolfsberger AC	Istanbul, Turkey
19:55 TRT (UTC+3)	Crivelli (yellow card) 21'; Gulbrandsen (yellow card) 30'; Škrtel (yellow card) 44'; Kahveci 78'	Report	Leitgeb (yellow card) 4'; Sollbauer (yellow card) 37'; Liendl (yellow card) 66'	Stadium: Başakşehir Fatih Terim Stadium; Attendance: 5,000; Referee: Irfan Peljto (Bosnia and Herzegovina)

7 November 2019 4	Wolfsberger AC (Austria)	0–3	(Turkey) İstanbul Başakşehir	Graz, Austria
21:00 CET (UTC+1)	Rnić (yellow card) 51' (yellow-red card) 73'; Weissman (yellow card) 77'	Report	Clichy (yellow card) 55'; Topal (yellow card) 70'; Višća 73' (pen.); Crivelli (yellow card) 76', (goal) 84', 87'	Stadium: Liebenauer Stadium; Attendance: 5,286; Referee: Sandro Schärer (Switzerland)

28 November 2019 5	İstanbul Başakşehir (Turkey)	0–3	(Italy) Roma	Istanbul, Turkey
20:55 TRT (UTC+3)	Topal (yellow card) 29'	Report	Veretout 30' (pen.); Kolarov (yellow card) 35'; Kluivert 41'; Džeko 45+1'	Stadium: Başakşehir Fatih Terim Stadium; Attendance: 12,879; Referee: Ovidiu Hațegan (Romania)

12 December 2019 6	Borussia Mönchengladbach (Germany)	1–2	(Turkey) İstanbul Başakşehir	Mönchengladbach, Germany
21:00 CET (UTC+1)	Thuram 33'	Report	Kahveci 44'; Topal (yellow card) 64'; Elia (yellow card) 70'; Crivelli 90+1'; Günok (yellow card) 90+4'	Stadium: Borussia-Park; Attendance: 40,046; Referee: José María Sánchez Martínez (Spain)

==== Knockout phase ====
===== Round of 32 =====
20 February 2020 First leg	Sporting CP (Portugal)	3–1	(Turkey) İstanbul Başakşehir	Lisbon, Portugal
17:55 WET (UTC±0)	Coates 3'; Šporar 44'; Vietto 51'; Neto (yellow card) 76'	Report	Crivelli (yellow card) 57'; Višća 76' (pen.); Ponck (yellow card) 79'	Stadium: Estádio José Alvalade; Attendance: 27,392; Referee: Anthony Taylor (England)

27 February 2020 Second leg	İstanbul Başakşehir (Turkey)	4–1 (a.e.t.) (5–4 agg.)	(Portugal) Sporting CP	Istanbul, Turkey
20:55 TRT (UTC+3)	Škrtel 31'; Aleksić (yellow card) 37', (goal) 45'; Clichy (yellow card) 71'; Epureanu (yellow card) 74'; Kahveci (yellow card) 81'; Višća 90+2', 119' (pen.)	Report	Wendel (yellow card) 34'; Vietto (yellow card) 42', (goal) 68'	Stadium: Başakşehir Fatih Terim Stadium; Attendance: 5,892; Referee: Antonio Mateu Lahoz (Spain)

===== Round of 16 =====
12 March 2020 First leg	İstanbul Başakşehir (Turkey)	1–0	(Denmark) Copenhagen	Istanbul, Turkey
20:55 TRT (UTC+3)	Kahveci (yellow card) 4'; Crivelli (yellow card) 60'; Višća 88' (pen.); Okechukwu (yellow card) 90+3'	Report	Santos (yellow card) 4'	Stadium: Başakşehir Fatih Terim Stadium; Attendance: 12,205; Referee: Willie Collum (Scotland)

5 August 2020 Second leg	Copenhagen (Denmark)	3–0 (3–1 agg.)	(Turkey) İstanbul Başakşehir	Copenhagen, Denmark
18:55 CEST (UTC+2)	Wind 4', 52' (pen.); Falk 62'; Bartolec (yellow card) 87'	Report	Elia (yellow card) 84'	Stadium: Parken Stadium; Attendance: 0 Referee: Daniele Orsato (Italy)
Note: The match between Copenhagen and İstanbul Başakşehir in Copenhagen was meant to be played behind closed doors due to an outbreak of COVID-19 in Denmark. However, on 13 March, All of the round of 16 second leg matches, originally scheduled to be played on 19 March, were indefinitely postponed due to a pandemic of COVID-19 in Europe. The match was rescheduled on 17 June to 5 August.
