= Dilmen =

Dilmen is a surname. Notable people with the surname include:

- Deniz Dilmen (born 2005), Turkish football goalkeeper
- Rıdvan Dilmen (born 1962), Turkish football attacking midfielder and winger
