= Léo Duarte =

Brazilian footballer (born 1996)

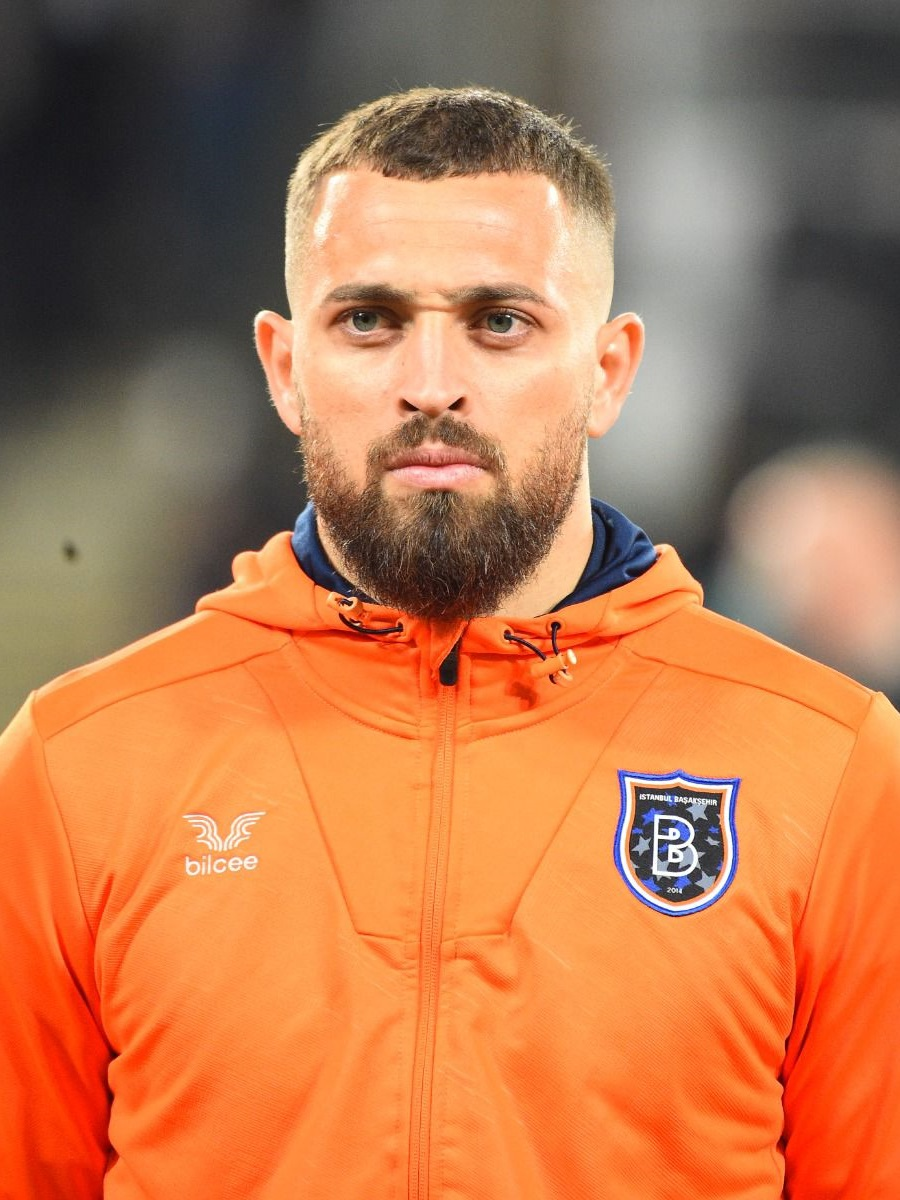
- Duarte with İstanbul Başakşehir in 2022

Personal information
- Full name: Leonardo Campos Duarte da Silva
- Date of birth: 17 July 1996 (age 30)
- Place of birth: Mococa, Brazil
- Height: 1.83 m (6 ft 0 in)
- Position: Centre-back

Team information
- Current team: Atlético Mineiro
- Number: 3

Youth career
- 2011–2013: Desportivo Brasil
- 2014–2016: Flamengo

Senior career*
Years	Team	Apps	(Gls)
2016–2019	Flamengo	68	(1)
2019–2022	AC Milan	7	(0)
2021–2022	→ İstanbul Başakşehir (loan)	50	(0)
2022–2026	İstanbul Başakşehir	115	(2)
2026–	Atlético Mineiro	5	(0)
- * Club domestic league appearances and goals as of 21:19, 10 November 2026 (UTC)

Leonardo Campos Duarte da Silva (born 17 July 1996), commonly known as Léo Duarte, is a Brazilian professional footballer who plays as a centre-back for Campeonato Brasileiro Série A club Atlético Mineiro.

== Career ==
=== Early career ===
Duarte spend most of his youth career at Flamengo winning multiples competitions, the most important was the 2016 Copa São Paulo de Futebol Júnior, the top youth tournament in Brazil, being the team captain and lifting the trophy. He had a solid tournament, being praised and along with Felipe Vizeu and Ronaldo, Duarte received has been praised as a player ready to be promoted to the professional team. Few weeks later all three players started training with the professional team.

=== Flamengo ===
On 5 March 2016, Duarte debuted as a starter in a 3–1 win over Bangu on a 2016 Campeonato Carioca match. In this particular game Flamengo fielded several young players and reserves.

Due to injuries and transfers throughout the 2016 season Duarte played in another eight matches, including seven in the 2016 Campeonato Brasileiro Série A and one appearance in 2016 Copa do Brasil, all matches as starter. His first Campeonato Brasileiro Série A match was on 14 May 2016 in a 1–0 win against Sport at Estádio Raulino de Oliveira in Volta Redonda. He scored his first goal for the club against Fluminense on 13 October 2018, scoring in the 45th+2nd minute.

On 22 August 2018, Duarte extended his contract with Flamengo until December 2022.

=== AC Milan ===
On 27 July 2019, Brazilian press announced the agreement between Flamengo and AC Milan in a €10 million transfer with a clause that could potentially rise to €11 million. On 7 August 2019, Duarte was officially announced as a Milan player on a five-year deal. He made his debut on 29 September 2019, in a 3–1 league defeat to Fiorentina.

=== İstanbul Başakşehir ===
On 11 January 2021, Duarte joined Turkish club İstanbul Başakşehir on loan until 30 June 2022. The deal includes the option to buy. He made his league debut against Sivasspor on 16 January 2021.

On 8 July 2022, Başakşehir announced the permanent signing of Duarte on a 4-year deal. During his permanent spell, he made his league debut against Kasımpaşa on 8 August 2022.

=== Atlético Mineiro ===
On 24 June 2026, Atlético Mineiro announced the signing of Léo Duarte on a free transfer and a four-year deal.

== Personal life ==
On 23 September 2020, he tested positive for COVID-19.

== Career statistics ==
As of 10 November 2026.

Appearances and goals by club, season and competition
Club	Season	League			State league (Note: Includes Campeonato Carioca, Campeonato Mineiro)		Cup		Continental		Other		Total	
Club	Season	Division	Apps	Goals	Apps	Goals	Apps	Goals	Apps	Goals	Apps	Goals	Apps	Goals
Flamengo	2016	Série A	7	0	1	0	1	0	—		—		9	0
Flamengo	2017	Série A	2	0	2	0	0	0	0	0	2 (Note: Appearance(s) in Primeira Liga)	0	6	0
Flamengo	2018	Série A	33	1	6	0	6	0	4 (Note: Appearance(s) in Copa Libertadores)	1	—		49	2
Flamengo	2019	Série A	7	0	10	0	4	0	7	0	—		28	0
Flamengo	Total		49	1	19	0	11	0	11	1	2	0	92	2
AC Milan	2019–20	Serie A	6	0	—		0	0	—		—		6	0
AC Milan	2020–21	Serie A	1	0	—		0	0	2 (Note: Appearance(s) in UEFA Europa League)	0	—		3	0
AC Milan	Total		7	0	—		0	0	2	0	—		9	0
İstanbul Başakşehir (loan)	2020–21	Süper Lig	17	0	—		3	0	—		1 (Note: Appearance(s) in Turkish Super Cup)	0	21	0
İstanbul Başakşehir (loan)	2021–22	Süper Lig	33	0	—		0	0	—		—		33	0
İstanbul Başakşehir	2022–23	Süper Lig	30	0	—		5	0	10 (Note: Appearance(s) in UEFA Conference League)	0	—		45	0
İstanbul Başakşehir	2023–24	Süper Lig	30	0	—		1	0	—		—		31	0
İstanbul Başakşehir	2024–25	Süper Lig	29	2	—		1	0	11	0	—		41	2
İstanbul Başakşehir	2025–26	Süper Lig	26	0	—		3	0	5	0	—		34	0
İstanbul Başakşehir	Total		165	2	—		13	0	26	0	1	0	205	2
Atlético Mineiro	2026	Série A	5	0	—		1	0	0	0	—		6	0
Career total			226	3	19	0	25	0	39	1	3	0	306	4

== Honours ==
Flamengo

- Campeonato Carioca: 2017, 2019
