= Miguel Vieira =

Portuguese footballer (born 1990)

Personal information
- Full name: Luís Miguel Vieira Silva
- Date of birth: 8 October 1990 (age 36)
- Place of birth: Amarante, Portugal
- Height: 1.90 m (6 ft 3 in)
- Position: Centre-back

Youth career
- 2000–2008: Vila Meã

Senior career*
| Years | Team | Apps | (Gls) |
| 2008–2012 | Vila Meã | 49 | (0) |
| 2012−2013 | Espinho | 30 | (2) |
| 2013–2015 | Aves | 65 | (4) |
| 2015–2018 | Paços Ferreira | 55 | (5) |
| 2018–2019 | Lugo | 34 | (1) |
| 2019–2022 | İstanbul Başakşehir | 1 | (0) |
| 2020 | → Wolfsberger AC (loan) | 7 | (0) |
| 2020–2021 | → Waasland-Beveren (loan) | 6 | (0) |
| Total | | 247 | (12) |
- * Club domestic league appearances and goals

Luís Miguel Vieira Silva (born 8 October 1990), known as Vieira, is a Portuguese former professional footballer who played as a central defender.

== Club career ==
Born in Amarante, Porto District, Vieira played lower league or amateur football until the age of 23. In the summer of 2013, he signed with Segunda Liga club C.D. Aves, making his professional debut on 18 August in a 1–1 away draw against U.D. Oliveirense where he played the full 90 minutes. In his second season, he scored a career-best four goals (in 40 matches) to help his team to the 18th position, still above the relegation zone.

In June 2015, Vieira moved to the Primeira Liga after signing a two-year contract with F.C. Paços de Ferreira. His maiden appearance in the competition took place on 30 August of that year, when he came on as a 42nd-minute substitute in a 1–1 home draw with F.C. Arouca.

Vieira scored four times again in the 2017–18 campaign. One of those goals came on 11 March 2018 as the hosts defeated eventual champions FC Porto 1–0, being nonetheless relegated as second-bottom.

On 17 July 2018, Vieira moved abroad for the first time in his career after agreeing to a three-year deal with Segunda División side CD Lugo. On 30 July of the following year, however, he was transferred to İstanbul Başakşehir F.K. of the Turkish Süper Lig.

Vieira spent the next two seasons on loan, first with Wolfsberger AC in the Austrian Football Bundesliga then Waasland-Beveren in the Belgian Pro League. In February 2022, after only six competitive appearances at the Başakşehir Fatih Terim Stadium, the 31-year-old left by mutual consent.
