= Karacabey Belediyespor =

Turkish sports club

- Full name: Karacabey Belediyespor A.Ş.
- Founded: 2008
- Ground: Mustafa Fehmi Gerçeker, Karacabey
- Capacity: 2,722
- Chairman: Sarp Yalçınkaya
- Manager: Tahsin Tam
- League: TFF 2. Lig
- 2025–26: TFF 2. Lig, White, 13th of 19
Home colours	Away colours

Karacabey Belediyespor is a football club from the Karacabey district of the Bursa Province.

== History ==
Former club crest

Nilüfer was the place were the club was founded as Nilüfer Belediyespor in 1999. The football branch split up in 2008 to become Bursa Nilüferspor A.Ş.. It was caused by government limitations against local municipalities to financially support and legally own professional football clubs. In 2016 businessmen from the Karacabey municipality bought the shares of the club and changed its name into Karacabey Birlikspor A.Ş.. In August 2018 the club changed its name into Karacabey Belediye Spor A.Ş..

== Stadium ==
The Mustafa Fehmi Gerçeker stadium is the homeground of the club, giving place to 2,722 spectators. It refers to Mustafa Fehmi Gerçeker; a Turkish theologian and politician from Bursa.

Bursa is in the Marmara Region.

== Current squad ==
As of 4 December 2025

Note: Flags indicate national team as defined under FIFA eligibility rules; some limited exceptions apply. Players may hold more than one non-FIFA nationality.

No.	Pos.	Nation	Player
2	DF	TUR	Yusuf Ziya Gümüş
4	DF	TUR	Fatih Eren
5	DF	TUR	Kadir Turhan
7	FW	TUR	Niyazi Salman
8	MF	TUR	Doğanay Kılıç (on loan from Bursa Yıldırımspor)
9	FW	TUR	Azat Çakar
10	MF	TUR	Abdullah Balıkçı
13	GK	TUR	Hüseyin Arslan
16	MF	TUR	Sedat Cengiz
17	MF	TUR	Atamer Bilgin
19	FW	TUR	Enes Yılmaz
21	FW	TUR	Berke Erdemer (on loan from Bursa Yıldırımspor)
24	MF	TUR	Berke Özgün
25	GK	TUR	Recep Tayip Kaya

No.	Pos.	Nation	Player
26	DF	TUR	Furkan Metin
27	MF	TUR	Ökkeş Karaoğlu
28	DF	TUR	Burak Albayrak
33	MF	TUR	Dora Şimşek
34	DF	TUR	Berke Büyük
35	GK	TUR	Taha Ayan
43	DF	TUR	Abdullah Balıkuv
44	DF	TUR	Nejdet Bilin
54	FW	TUR	İbrahim Can Köse
74	DF	TUR	Talha Yünkuş
80	MF	TUR	Furkan Yasin Yalçın
94	DF	TUR	Fahri Pınar
99	FW	TUR	Tayyip Mevlüt Kaya

=== Out on loan ===
Note: Flags indicate national team as defined under FIFA eligibility rules; some limited exceptions apply. Players may hold more than one non-FIFA nationality.

No.	Pos.	Nation	Player
—	DF	TUR	Bedirhan Çetin (at Kahramanmaraşspor until 30 June 2026)
—	DF	TUR	Mehmet Can Gülerer (at Bursa Yıldırımspor until 30 June 2026)

No.	Pos.	Nation	Player
—	MF	TUR	Atakan Dama (at Ankara Demirspor until 30 June 2026)
