= List of İstanbul Başakşehir F.K. seasons =

İstanbul Başakşehir Futbol Kulübü is a Turkish professional football club based in the Başakşehir district of Istanbul, Turkey. The club was founded in 1990 as İstanbul Büyükşehir Belediyespor. They first reached the highest level in Turkish Football in 2007–08.

== Past seasons ==
=== Domestic results ===
Season	League	Pos	Pld	W	D	L	GF	GA	Pts	Turkish Cup
During the 1990–91 season, İstanbul BB competed at the amateur level.
1991–92	2. Lig	9	34	10	13	11	35	37	43	–
1992–93	2. Lig	1	30	19	8	3	51	20	65	–
1993–94	1. Lig	6	32	9	12	11	35	37	39	2nd Round
1994–95	1. Lig	9	32	8	10	14	35	46	34	3rd Round
1995–96	2. Lig	3	26	14	8	4	49	22	50	–
1996–97	2. Lig	1	32	22	8	2	82	27	74	2nd Round
1997–98	1. Lig	3	35	18	8	9	62	45	62	5th Round
1998–99	1. Lig	7	36	16	7	13	65	52	55	4th Round
1999–00	1. Lig	4	32	15	9	8	47	32	54	2nd Round
2000–01	1. Lig	5	37	19	7	11	80	57	64	3rd Round
2001–02	1. Lig	12	38	13	11	14	46	45	50	Last 32
2002–03	1. Lig	14	34	11	7	13	35	48	40	1st Round
2003–04	1. Lig	13	34	10	7	14	42	50	37	2nd Round
2004–05	1. Lig	9	34	12	10	12	34	35	46	1st Round
2005–06	1. Lig	7	34	13	13	8	43	31	52	2nd Round
2006–07	1. Lig	2	34	19	8	7	56	27	65	Group stage
2007–08	Süper Lig	12	34	10	8	16	44	47	38	2nd Round
2008–09	Süper Lig	9	34	12	6	16	37	46	42	2nd Round
2009–10	Süper Lig	6	34	16	8	10	47	11	56	Quarter-finals
2010–11	Süper Lig	12	34	12	6	16	40	45	42	Runners-up
2011–12	Süper Lig	6	34	14	8	12	48	49	50	Last 16
2012–13	Süper Lig	16	34	9	9	16	43	50	36	2nd Round
2013–14	1. Lig	1	36	24	6	6	76	38	78	Last 32
From this season onwards, the club is known as İstanbul Başakşehir Futbol Kulübü
2014–15	Süper Lig	4	34	15	14	5	49	30	59	Last 16
2015–16	Süper Lig	4	34	16	11	7	54	36	59	Quarter-finals
2016–17	Süper Lig	2	34	21	10	3	63	28	73	Runners-up
2017–18	Süper Lig	3	34	22	6	6	62	34	72	Last 16
2018–19	Süper Lig	2	34	19	10	5	49	22	67	Last 16
2019–20	Süper Lig	1	34	20	9	5	65	34	69	Last 16
2020–21	Süper Lig	12	40	12	12	16	43	55	48	Semi-finals
2021–22	Süper Lig	4	38	19	8	11	56	36	65	Fourth round
2022–23	Süper Lig	5	36	18	8	10	54	37	62	Runners-up
2023–24	Süper Lig	4	38	18	7	13	57	43	61	Quarter-finals
2024–25	Süper Lig	5	36	16	6	14	60	56	54	Group stage

=== League affiliation ===
- Süper Lig: 2007–13, 2014–
- TFF First League: 1993–95, 1997–07, 2013–14
- TFF Second League: 1992–93, 1995–97
