= Doğanay Kılıç =

Turkish footballer

Personal information
- Date of birth: 8 June 1996 (age 30)
- Place of birth: Bafra, Turkey
- Height: 1.77 m (5 ft 10 in)
- Position: Midfielder

Team information
- Current team: Karacabey Belediyespor (on loan from Bursa Yıldırımspor)
- Number: 8

Youth career
- 2007–2010: 1930 Bafraspor
- 2010–2013: Bursaspor

Senior career*
Years	Team	Apps	(Gls)
2013–2016	Bursaspor A2	42	(8)
2013–2016	Bursaspor	1	(0)
2016–2017	Gaziantepspor	9	(0)
2017–2019	Göztepe	4	(0)
2018–2019	→ Adanaspor (loan)	14	(0)
2019–2020	İstanbul Başakşehir	0	(0)
2019–2020	→ Kastamonuspor 1966 (loan)	24	(2)
2020–2021	Kahramanmaraşspor	31	(3)
2021–2022	Pendikspor	4	(0)
2022–	Bursa Yıldırımspor	86	(6)
2025–	→ Karacabey Belediyespor (loan)	10	(0)

International career
2013–2014	Turkey U18	7	(0)
2014	Turkey U19	1	(0)
- * Club domestic league appearances and goals as of 2 November 2025

Doğanay Kılıç (born 8 June 1996) is a Turkish footballer who plays as a midfielder for TFF 2. Lig club Karacabey Belediyespor on loan from Bursa Yıldırımspor.

== Career ==
Doğanay made his Süper Lig debut on 19 May 2013 with Bursaspor against Gençlerbirliği.
