= Metin Emre Karaal =

Turkish footballer

Personal information
- Date of birth: 15 January 2003 (age 23)
- Place of birth: Bayrampaşa, Turkey
- Height: 1.85 m (6 ft 1 in)
- Position: Midfielder

Team information
- Current team: Yozgat Belediyesi Bozokspor
- Number: 8

Youth career
- 2013–2020: İstanbul Başakşehir

Senior career*
Years	Team	Apps	(Gls)
2020–	İstanbul Başakşehir	3	(0)
2022–2023	→ Sarıyer (loan)	12	(0)
2023	→ Tepecikspor (loan)	5	(0)
2023–2024	→ Anadolu Üniversitesi (loan)	18	(2)
2025	→ Muşspor (loan)	5	(0)
2025–	Yozgat Belediyesi Bozokspor	1	(0)

International career^{‡}
2017	Turkey U15	3	(0)
2022	Turkey U19	5	(0)
- * Club domestic league appearances and goals as of 21 September 2025 ‡ National team caps and goals as of 29 March 2022

Metin Emre Karaal (born 15 January 2003) is a Turkish professional footballer who plays as a midfielder for TFF Third League club Yozgat Belediyesi Bozokspor.

== Professional career ==
A youth product of İstanbul Başakşehir, Karaal signed his first professional contract with the club on 9 January 2020. He made his senior debut with Başakşehir in a 2-0 Süper Lig win over Çaykur Rizespor on 15 May 2021.

On 5 January 2023, Karaal joined Tepecikspor on loan.

== International career ==
Karaal is a youth international for Turkey, having represented the Turkey U15s.
