= Mustafa Fehmi Gerçeker =

Turkish politician

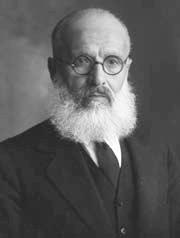

Member of the Grand National Assembly

Personal details
- Born: 1868 Bursa, Ottoman Empire
- Died: 16 September 1950 (aged 81–82) Bursa, Turkey

Mustafa Fehmi Gerçeker (1868, Bursa, Ottoman Empire – 16 September 1950, Bursa, Turkey) was a Turkish theologian and politician, who was one of the closest advisors of Mustafa Kemal Atatürk. He is most notable for his contributions in the separation of church and state.

== Biography ==
He was born in Karacabey, Bursa. His father was Hafız Mehmed Emin Efendi. He became a member of the Committee of Union and Progress (1906). In the same year, he was appointed as the mufti of Karacabey in 1910 after receiving the title of professor. After the Armistice of Mudros, he joined the Turkish National Movement by establishing the Karacabey branch of the Association of Civil Rights (1919). He entered the Grand National Assembly as a deputy from Bursa on April 23, 1920.

Mustafa Fehmi, known for his civil courage, scientific approach and patriotism, died in Bursa on 16 September 1950.
