= Mahmut Tekdemir =

Turkish footballer

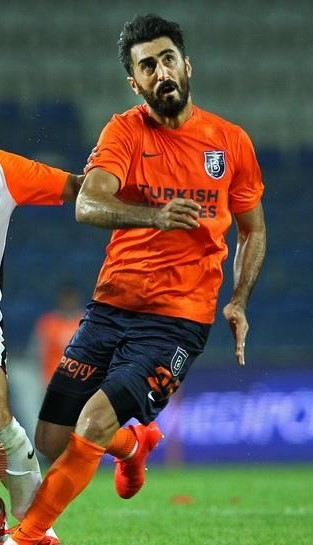
- Tekdemir playing for İstanbul Başakşehir in 2016

Personal information
- Date of birth: 20 January 1988 (age 38)
- Place of birth: Çermik, Diyarbakır, Turkey
- Height: 1.78 m (5 ft 10 in)
- Positions: Defensive midfielder; centre back

Team information
- Current team: Ankaragücü
- Number: 21

Youth career
- 1999–2000: Eroğluspor
- 2000–2003: Damlaspor
- 2003–2006: İstanbul Başakşehir

Senior career*
Years	Team	Apps	(Gls)
2006–2024	İstanbul Başakşehir	422	(17)
2024–	Ankaragücü	26	(0)

International career^{‡}
2007	Turkey U19	3	(0)
2008–2010	Turkey U21	4	(0)
2011–2013	Turkey B	4	(0)
2015–2021	Turkey	22	(0)
- * Club domestic league appearances and goals as of 15 June 2025 ‡ National team caps and goals as of 31 May 2022

Mahmut Tekdemir (born 20 January 1988) is a Turkish professional footballer who plays as a defensive midfielder for Ankaragücü.

== Club career ==
Tekdemir holds İstanbul Başakşehir's all-time appearances record with 494 overall appearances as of 10 December 2023.

== International career ==
Tekdemir is a youth and A2 international. He got his first callup in a friendly 2-1 win over Luxembourg.

== Statistics ==
=== Club ===
As of 28 March 2024

Appearances and goals by club, season and competition
Club	Season	League			Cup (Note: Includes Turkish Cup)		Continental (Note: Includes UEFA Champions League, UEFA Europa League, and UEFA Europa Conference League)		Other (Note: Includes Turkish Super Cup)		Total	
Club	Season	Division	Apps	Goals	Apps	Goals	Apps	Goals	Apps	Goals	Apps	Goals
İstanbul Başakşehir (Note: Club was named as İstanbul Büyükşehir Belediyespor until the end of 2013–14 season.)	2006–07	Süper Lig	0	0	1	0	—		—		1	0
İstanbul Başakşehir	2007–08	Süper Lig	5	0	0	0	—		—		5	0
İstanbul Başakşehir	2008–09	Süper Lig	21	0	1	0	—		—		22	0
İstanbul Başakşehir	2009–10	Süper Lig	23	0	3	0	—		—		26	0
İstanbul Başakşehir	2010–11	Süper Lig	28	0	7	0	—		—		35	0
İstanbul Başakşehir	2011–12	Süper Lig	36	0	0	0	—		—		36	0
İstanbul Başakşehir	2012–13	Süper Lig	28	1	0	0	—		—		28	1
İstanbul Başakşehir	2013–14	1. Lig	29	1	2	1	—		—		31	2
İstanbul Başakşehir	2014–15	Süper Lig	29	4	3	0	—		—		32	4
İstanbul Başakşehir	2015–16	Süper Lig	31	1	5	0	2	0	—		38	1
İstanbul Başakşehir	2016–17	Süper Lig	26	2	4	0	3	0	—		33	2
İstanbul Başakşehir	2017–18	Süper Lig	26	1	3	0	6	0	—		35	1
İstanbul Başakşehir	2018–19	Süper Lig	32	0	0	0	2	0	—		34	0
İstanbul Başakşehir	2019–20	Süper Lig	24	3	1	0	7	0	—		32	3
İstanbul Başakşehir	2020–21	Süper Lig	31	1	1	0	3	0	0	0	35	1
İstanbul Başakşehir	2021–22	Süper Lig	25	3	0	0	0	0	—		25	3
İstanbul Başakşehir	2022–23	Süper Lig	24	0	4	0	13	0	—		41	0
İstanbul Başakşehir	2023–24	Süper Lig	8	0	3	0	0	0	—		11	0
Career total			398	17	33	1	25	0	0	0	456	18

=== International ===
As of 30 July 2022:

National team	Season	Apps	Goals
Turkey
Turkey	2015	1	0
Turkey	2016	1	0
Turkey	2017	–	
Turkey	2018	6	0
Turkey	2019	7	0
Turkey	2020	6	0
Turkey	2021	1	0
Total		22	0

== Honours ==
İstanbul Büyükşehir Belediyespor

- TFF First League (1): 2013–14

İstanbul Başakşehir F.K.

- Süper Lig (1): 2019–20
