= Deniz Dilmen =

Turkish footballer

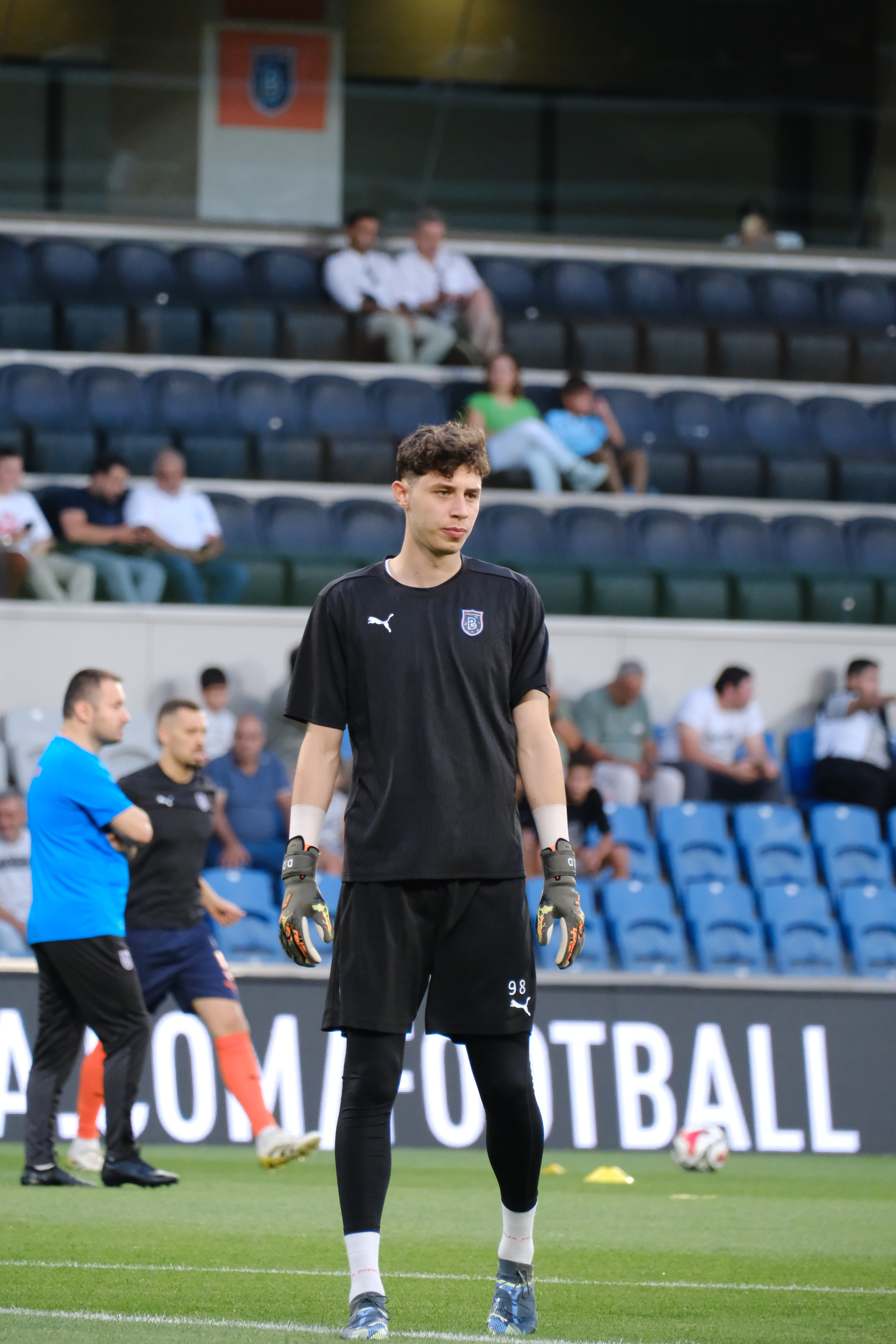

Personal information
- Date of birth: 5 June 2005 (age 21)
- Place of birth: Istanbul, Türkiye
- Height: 2.00 m (6 ft 7 in)
- Position: Goalkeeper

Team information
- Current team: İstanbul Başakşehir
- Number: 98

Youth career
- 2014–2017: Küçükköyspor
- 2017–2018: Haliç Spor
- 2018–2021: İstanbul Başakşehir

Senior career*
Years	Team	Apps	(Gls)
2021–	İstanbul Başakşehir	7	(0)
2025–2026	→ Pendikspor (loan)	31	(0)

International career^{‡}
2021–2022	Turkey U17	4	(0)
2023	Turkey U19	2	(0)
2025–	Turkey U21	1	(0)
- * Club domestic league appearances and goals as of 11 October 2026 ‡ National team caps and goals as of 18 November 2025

Deniz Dilmen (born 5 June 2005) is a Turkish professional footballer who plays as a goalkeeper for Süper Lig club İstanbul Başakşehir.

== Club career ==
Dilmen is a youth product of Küçükköyspor and Haliç Spor, before moving to İstanbul Başakşehir's youth academy in 2018. On 2 July 2021, he signed his first professional contract with Başakşehir for 3 seasons. He debuted with Başakşehir in a 3–2 Süper Lig win over Adana Demirspor on 3 June 2023, becoming their youngest ever goalkeeper to debut. On 3 August 2023, Dilmen extended his contract with Başakşehir until 2027.

== International career ==
Dilmen is a youth international for Turkey, having represented the Turkey U17s and U19s. In March 2024, he was called up to the Turkey U21s.

== Career statistics ==
As of match played 7 May 2026

Appearances and goals by club, season and competition
Club	Season	League			National cup		Europe		Other		Total	
Club	Season	Division	Apps	Goals	Apps	Goals	Apps	Goals	Apps	Goals	Apps	Goals
İstanbul Başakşehir	2021–22	Süper Lig	0	0	—		—		—		0	0
İstanbul Başakşehir	2021–22	Süper Lig	0	0	0	0	—		—		0	0
İstanbul Başakşehir	2022–23	Süper Lig	1	0	0	0	0	0	—		1	0
İstanbul Başakşehir	2023–24	Süper Lig	1	0	4	0	—		—		5	0
İstanbul Başakşehir	2020–21	Süper Lig	2	0	2	0	3	0	—		7	0
İstanbul Başakşehir	2025–26	Süper Lig	1	0	—		0	0	—		1	0
İstanbul Başakşehir	Total		5	0	6	0	3	0	—		14	0
Pendikspor (loan)	2025–26	TFF 1. Lig	31	0	2	0	—		1	0	34	0
Career total			36	0	8	0	3	0	0	0	47	0
