= Göksel Gümüşdağ =

Turkish businessman (born 1972)

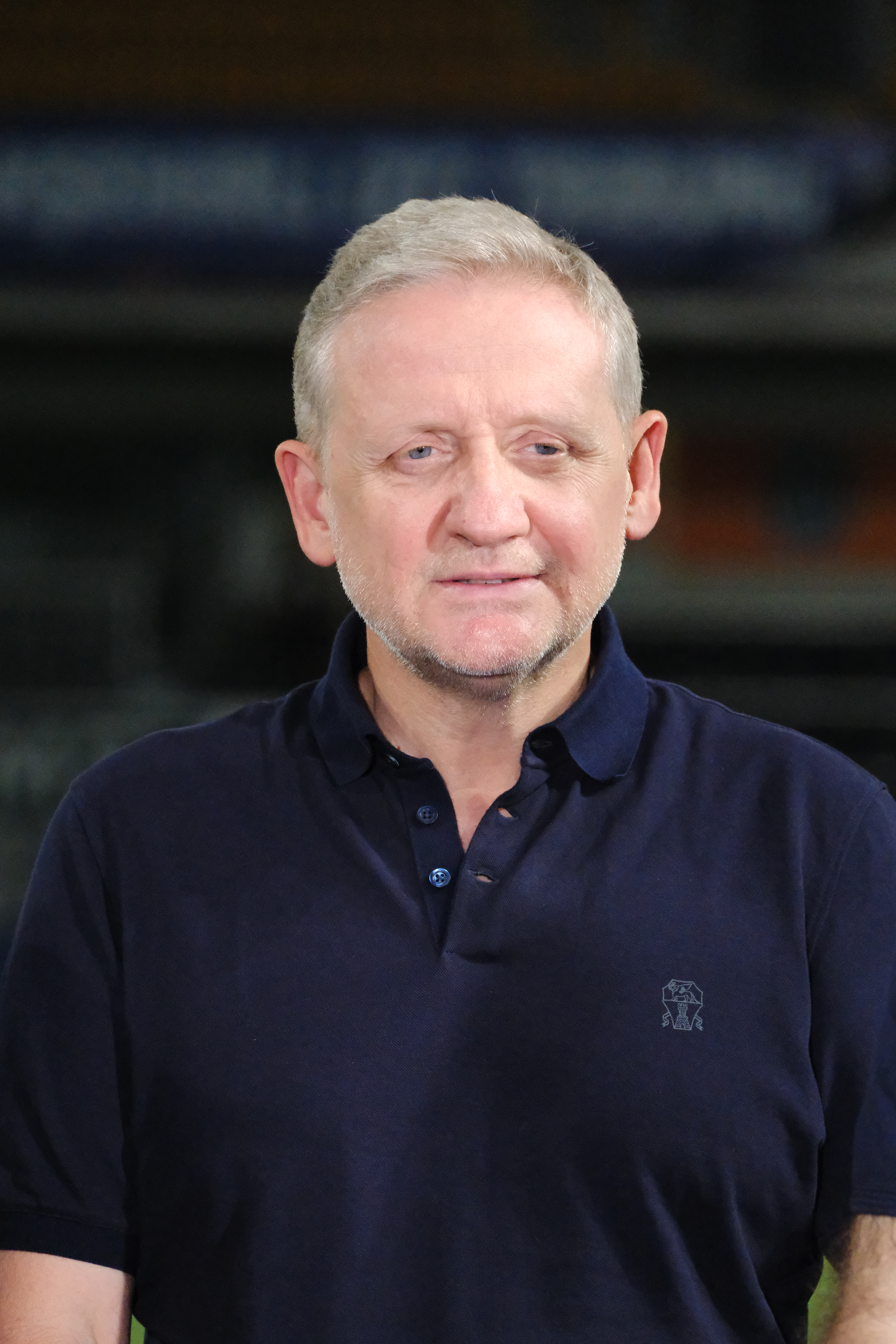

President of İstanbul Başakşehir
- Incumbent
- Assumed office 4 June 2014
- Preceded by: Position established

President of Turkish Union of Clubs
- In office 7 August 2014 – 10 August 2017
- Preceded by: İlhan Cavcav
- Succeeded by: Dursun Özbek

President of İstanbul Büyükşehir Belediyespor
- In office 2006–2011
- Preceded by: Osman Aşkın Bak
- Succeeded by: Çağatay Kalkancı

Personal details
- Born: 10 September 1972 (age 54) Istanbul, Turkey
- Party: Justice and Development Party (2002–present)
- Education: Anadolu University; Istanbul Bilgi University
- Occupation: Entrepreneur, businessman

Göksel Gümüşdağ (born 10 October 1972) is a Turkish businessman, president of İstanbul Başakşehir and former vice-president of the Turkish Football Federation. He is the chair of the board of directors of Gümüşdağ Electronic LLC.

Gümüşdağ was born in Istanbul on 10 October 1972. He graduated from Anadolu University Economics and Istanbul Bilgi University Business Administration Department. In 2014, he was elected president of İstanbul Başakşehir from Süper Lig teams. He is still a member of the Istanbul Bilgi University Board of Trustees. He was the President of the Clubs Association Foundation between 2014–2017.
