= Başakşehir Fatih Terim Stadium =

Stadium in the Başakşehir district of Istanbul, Turkey

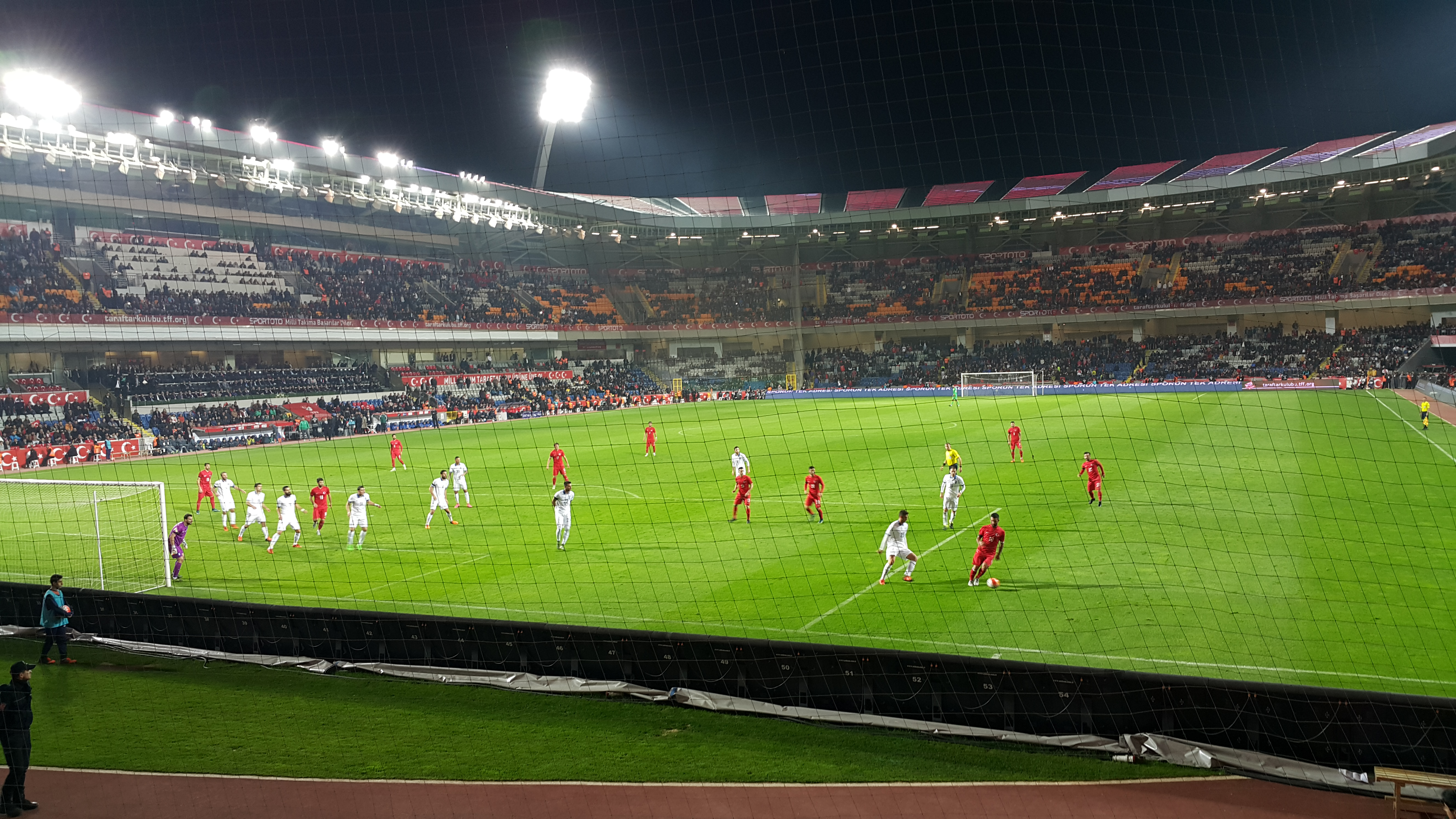

- Location in Istanbul Location in Turkey
- Full name: Başakşehir Fatih Terim Stadyumu
- Location: Başakşehir, Istanbul, Turkey
- Coordinates: 41°07′22″N 28°48′31″E
- Owner: Ministry of Youth and Sports
- Operator: İstanbul Başakşehir F.K.
- Capacity: 17,156
- Executive suites: 30

Construction
- Groundbreaking: 1 June 2011
- Built: 2011–2014
- Opened: 26 July 2014
- Cost: $13 million
- Architect: Arima Architects
- General contractor: Kalyon Group

Tenants
- İstanbul Başakşehir F.K. (2014–present); Turkey national football team (selected matches)

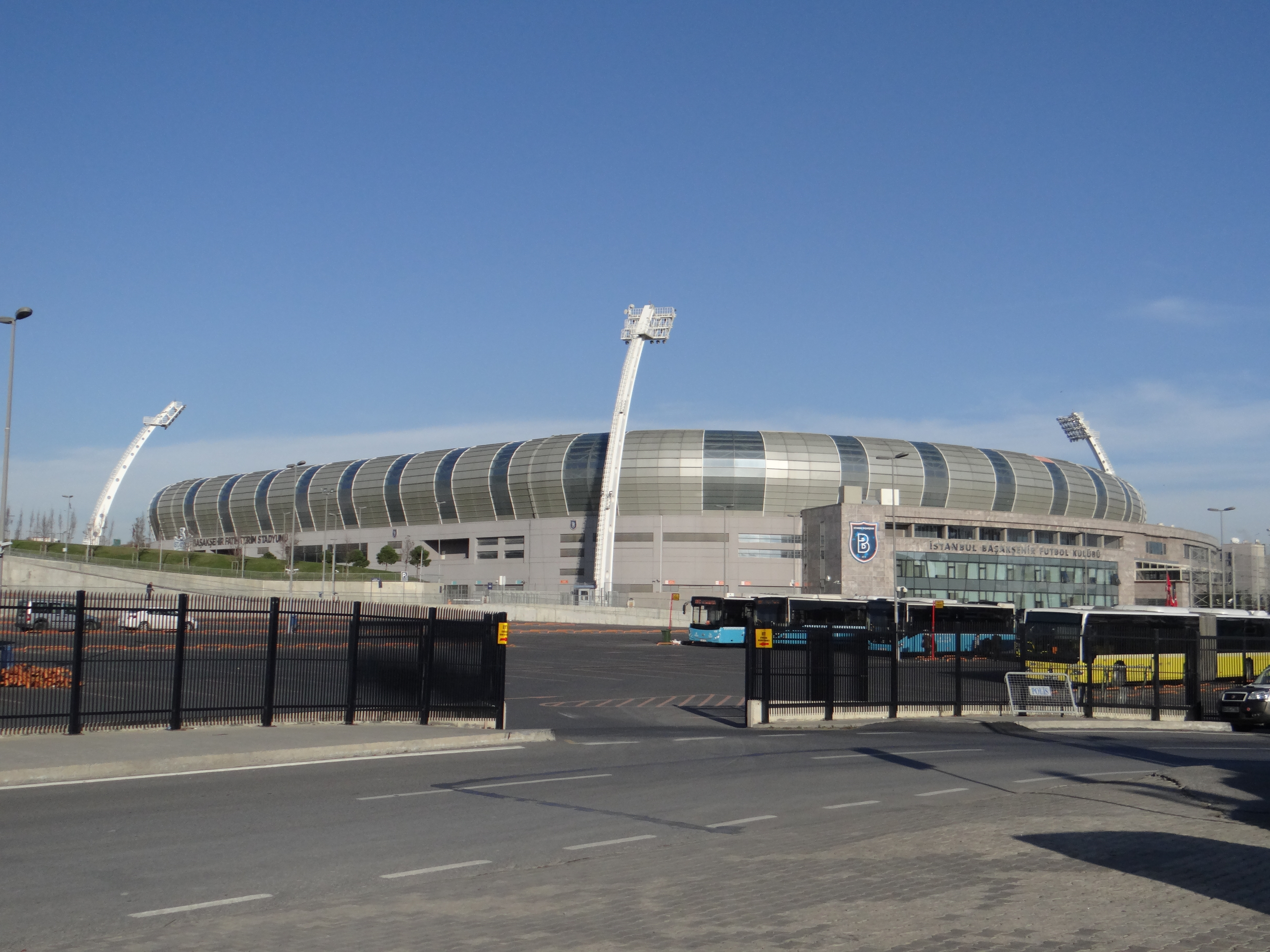
Başakşehir Fatih Terim Stadium

The Başakşehir Fatih Terim Stadium (Turkish: Başakşehir Fatih Terim Stadyumu) is a football stadium in the Başakşehir district of Istanbul, Turkey. The stadium is named in honour of Turkish footballer and manager Fatih Terim.

Opened officially to public on 26 July 2014, the venue has a capacity of 17,156 spectators. It is the current home of İstanbul Başakşehir F.K. playing in the Süper Lig.

The construction of the stadium was completed in about 16 months, and it cost ₺178 million.

Qarabağ FK played its 2020–21 UEFA Europa League group stage home matches at the stadium instead of their regular home stadium Tofiq Bahramov Republican Stadium in Baku due to the 2020 Nagorno-Karabakh conflict.
