= İstanbul Başakşehir F.K. =

Turkish professional football club

İstanbul Başakşehir
- Full name: İstanbul Başakşehir Futbol Kulübü
- Nicknames: Boz Baykuşlar (The Grey Owls); Turuncu Lacivertliler (The Orange-Navy Blues)
- Short name: İBFK
- Founded: 15 June 1990; 36 years ago, as İstanbul Büyükşehir Belediyesi Spor Kulübü; 4 June 2014; 12 years ago, as İstanbul Başakşehir Futbol Kulübü
- Stadium: Başakşehir Fatih Terim Stadium
- Capacity: 17,067
- Coordinates: 41°07′22″N 28°48′31″E
- President: Göksel Gümüşdağ
- Head coach: Nuri Şahin
- League: Süper Lig
- 2025–26: Süper Lig, 5th of 18
- Website: ibfk.com.tr
Home colours	Away colours	Third colours

İstanbul Başakşehir Futbol Kulübü (Turkish pronunciation: [isˈtanbuɫ baˈʃakʃehiɾ ˈfutboɫ kulyˈby]), commonly referred to as Başakşehir or, due to sponsorship reasons, Rams Başakşehir, is a professional football club based in the Başakşehir district of Istanbul, Turkey. Known for its vibrant orange and navy colors, the club was established in 1990 as İstanbul Büyükşehir Belediyespor and separated its football activities in the year 2014 from the municipality and competes in the top tier of Turkish football, the Süper Lig.

The team plays its home matches at the Başakşehir Fatih Terim Stadium, which has been their base since 2014. The club achieved its first league championship in the 2019–20 season, marking a milestone in its relatively young history.

Başakşehir continues to participate in various domestic and international tournaments, including the Turkish Cup, UEFA Champions League, UEFA Europa League and UEFA Conference League, showcasing its ambition to become a consistent contender in Turkish and European football.

== History ==
=== 1990–2014: İstanbul Büyükşehir Belediyespor ===
The roots of the club lie in the multi-sport organisation İstanbul Büyükşehir Belediyespor (İstanbul BBSK), created in 1990 under mayor Nurettin Sözen when the municipality brought together the amateur sides of İETT, İtfaiyespor and İSKİ under one umbrella. The football team initially competed in the lower national divisions in the early 1990s and worked its way up the league ladder.

İstanbul BBSK earned promotion to the top flight for the first time at the end of the 2006–07 season, finishing in the automatic promotion places of Lig A (then the second tier). In their debut Süper Lig campaign they finished 12th in 2007–08, consolidating their status. Two seasons later the team recorded a 6th-place finish in 2009–10, the best league placing of the İstanbul BBSK era. In 2010–11, under head coach Abdullah Avcı, İstanbul BB matched their strongest league form and also reached the Turkish Cup final for the first time; they were beaten by Beşiktaş on penalties after a 2–2 draw (a.e.t.) at Kadir Has Stadium in Kayseri.

Relegation followed in 2012–13 after finishing 16th, sending the club back to the second tier. They made an immediate return as champions of the second tier in 2013–14, securing promotion back to the Süper Lig.

=== 2014–present: İstanbul Başakşehir (rebranded) ===
On 4 June 2014, the professional football branch was spun off from the municipality structure and reconstituted as a joint-stock company under the name İstanbul Başakşehir Futbol Kulübü, with Göksel Gümüşdağ appointed chairman. In its debut Süper Lig season as Başakşehir, the team finished 4th, qualifying for the UEFA Europa League qualifiers. In the 2015–16 season qualifiers, the team was eliminated by AZ Alkmaar but secured another 4th-place league finish. During the 2016–17 season, Başakşehir defeated Rijeka in the qualifiers but was eliminated by Shakhtar Donetsk before reaching the group stage.

In just their third season after rebranding, Başakşehir finished as runners-up in the 2016–17 Süper Lig. In the 2017–18 UEFA Champions League qualifiers, they defeated Club Brugge but were knocked out by Sevilla in the play-off round. They subsequently participated in the 2017–18 UEFA Europa League group stage, finishing 3rd in Group C. Domestically, Başakşehir finished the 2017–18 season in 3rd place. In the following season, Başakşehir was eliminated by Burnley in the 2018–19 UEFA Europa League qualifiers but secured a 2nd-place finish in the 2018–19 Süper Lig.

Ahead of the 2019–20 season, Başakşehir adopted the slogan “New Vision, Same Goal.” Although they were eliminated by Olympiacos in the 2019–20 UEFA Champions League play-off, they topped Group J in the 2019–20 UEFA Europa League, competing against Roma, Borussia Mönchengladbach, and Wolfsberger AC. They advanced to the Round of 32, defeating Sporting CP but were eliminated in the Round of 16 by Copenhagen.

On 19 July 2020, Başakşehir clinched their first Süper Lig title, sealing the championship with a 1–0 home win over Kayserispor on the penultimate matchday at the Başakşehir Fatih Terim Stadium. Coached by Okan Buruk, and led by figures such as Mahmut Tekdemir, Edin Višća, Demba Ba and Enzo Crivelli, Başakşehir became only the sixth club to win the competition and the fourth from Istanbul to lift the trophy, following Galatasaray, Fenerbahçe and Beşiktaş. The title also marked the first championship by a club outside the “Big Four” since Bursaspor in 2009–10 and secured a place in the UEFA Champions League qualifiers for the following season.

As champions they qualified directly for the UEFA Champions League group stage the following season. In the 2020–21 group stage, Başakşehir were drawn in Group H with Paris Saint-Germain, Manchester United and RB Leipzig, and finished fourth. The high point was a 2–1 home win over Manchester United in Istanbul. Their final match in Paris was abandoned after an incident involving the fourth official and resumed the next day with a new crew; Paris Saint-Germain won 5–1.

In 2020–21, Başakşehir struggled domestically after the title year and finished 12th in the league; manager Okan Buruk departed on 29 January 2021 and Aykut Kocaman was appointed on 1 February. In 2021–22, Emre Belözoğlu took charge in October and lifted the side to 4th place with 65 points and a European berth. In 2022–23, Başakşehir topped UEFA Europa Conference League Group A ahead of Fiorentina and Hearts and reached the Round of 16, where they were eliminated by Gent (1–1 away, 1–4 home); they finished 5th in the league.

On 18 February 2024, it was reported that City Football Group, the ownership group behind Manchester City, reached a partnership agreement with the club in order to improve their football strategy, recruitment, scouting and coaching methodology. This development marked a significant milestone for the club, aligning it with one of the most successful football group structures in the world. The deal is expected to enhance Başakşehir’s international presence and bolster its financial and operational capabilities.

After finishing the 2023–24 season in 4th place with 61 points, Başakşehir qualified for Europe. In 2024–25 they finished 5th in the Süper Lig on 54 points under head coach Çağdaş Atan. Atan then signed a new two-year deal with the club on 29 May 2025.

== Crest and colours ==
İstanbul Başakşehir’s crest prominently features a stylized shield containing a bold “B” at the center, signifying both “Başakşehir” and the club’s modern identity. The background showcases a pattern of stars representing ambition, vision, and the pursuit of excellence, while the year “2014” inscribed on the crest marks the club’s re-establishment and transformation from a municipal team into a professionally managed entity.

The club’s official colours—orange and navy blue—were deliberately chosen to break from traditional color schemes associated with Istanbul’s other major clubs. Orange, a vibrant and energetic tone, symbolizes dynamism, youth, and innovation, while navy blue conveys professionalism, strength, and strategic discipline.

The crest was designed to emphasize the club’s breakaway identity from its roots as İstanbul Büyükşehir Belediyespor and signal its arrival as an ambitious contender in Turkish football. It reflects the club’s urban-modernist ethos, representing the Başakşehir district a growing suburban area of Istanbul known for rapid development, modern infrastructure, and a younger demographic.

In addition to its visual identity, Başakşehir maintains branding consistency across its marketing, kit designs, and digital presence. Their kits are often designed with minimalist aesthetics emphasizing clean lines and bold contrasts, in line with their status as one of the most modern and corporate-driven football clubs in the Süper Lig.

=== Kit suppliers and shirt sponsors ===
Period	Kit manufacturer	Shirt sponsor
2006–2007	Adidas	İstaç
2007–2008	Lescon	Sunny
2008–2009	Lescon	Kalpen
2009–2010	Nike	Turkcell
2010–2011	Nike	Medical Park
2011–2013	Nike	Fakir
2013–2014	Lescon	Fakir
2014–2015	Adidas	Makro
2015–2018	Nike	Makro
2018–2019	Macron	Decovita
2019–2020	Macron	Mall of Istanbul
2020–2022	Bilcee	Decovita
2022–2023	Joma	Balkar
2023–2024	Joma	Todini
2024–	Puma	Todini

== Stadium ==
Before the club was renamed İstanbul Başakşehir, they played most of their home matches at the Atatürk Olympic Stadium, the largest stadium in Turkey with a capacity of over 75,000. It was primarily chosen due to its availability and proximity, although its vast size often resulted in low attendances and a limited matchday atmosphere for a relatively smaller club like İstanbul BB.

To establish a more permanent and identity-driven home, construction of a new stadium began in the Başakşehir district. The Başakşehir Fatih Terim Stadium officially opened on 26 July 2014, and the club began hosting home matches there starting from the 2014–15 Süper Lig season.

Named after the iconic Turkish coach Fatih Terim, the stadium seats 17,800 spectators and features modern football infrastructure, including VIP suites, press areas, player facilities, and hospitality lounges. Located near major highways and accessible by Istanbul’s expanding metro system, it has quickly become a fan-centric venue. Since opening, the stadium has not only served as İstanbul Başakşehir’s home ground but has also hosted Turkey national youth team matches and various UEFA competition fixtures, thanks to its UEFA Category 4 certification and modern design.

=== Attendances ===
In the UEFA Champions League group stage, Başakşehir’s home match against Paris Saint-Germain on 28 October 2020 at the Fatih Terim Stadium was played before an official attendance of 350. On 4 November 2020, Başakşehir defeated Manchester United 2–1 in Istanbul, again with an official attendance of 350.

Earlier, in the 2017–18 Champions League third qualifying round (second leg), Başakşehir hosted Club Brugge on 2 August 2017 at the Fatih Terim Stadium before 9,168 spectators.

Season-by-season Süper Lig home averages at the Fatih Terim Stadium have remained modest. Recent aggregates on TFF list: 2,476 (2024–25), 2,598 (2023–24), 2,584 (2022–23); 2020–21 recorded 0 due to restrictions on spectators.

The lowest recorded home attendance in the available database for a Süper Lig match at the Fatih Terim Stadium is 672 (vs Kasımpaşa, 11 December 2021).

== Club identity and supporters ==
Başakşehir are linked closely to the ruling Justice and Development Party (AKP) and President Recep Tayyip Erdoğan. Originally founded in the 1990s as İstanbul Büyükşehir Belediyespor by the Istanbul municipality during Erdoğan’s tenure as mayor, the club was rebranded in 2014 as İstanbul Başakşehir FK. The rebranding coincided with the rise of the Başakşehir district, a newly developed area aligned with Erdoğan’s vision for a conservative, pious urban middle class. The club’s former president, Göksel Gümüşdağ, is both a member of the AKP and related to Erdoğan by marriage. Erdoğan personally opened Başakşehir’s new stadium in 2014, where he played in a ceremonial match and had the number 12 retired in his honour. The club has received sponsorship from companies closely linked to the government, such as Medipol, whose founder Fahrettin Koca later served as health minister in Erdoğan’s cabinet.

These connections have led critics to label Başakşehir as a “regime club” or “FC Erdoğan”. The club’s rapid rise in Turkish football has been widely perceived as politically driven, supported by state-linked resources and favourable media coverage. This has drawn a sharp contrast with traditional Istanbul clubs like Beşiktaş, Galatasaray, and Fenerbahçe, which have larger, historic, and often more oppositional fanbases. For some observers, Başakşehir symbolises the AKP’s broader strategy of reshaping Turkish cultural institutions, using football as a platform to promote its political and social ideals.

The supporter group of İstanbul Başakşehir is 1453 Başakşehir. 1453 Başakşehir have been categorised as heavily nationalist and pro-Erdoğan. 1453 Başakşehir made the headlines for the first time with a giant "Commander-in-Chief Erdoğan" banner they opened during a Champions League qualifier against Club Brugge. The previous supporter group, Boz Baykuşlar, which existed before the club’s restructuring, has voluntarily chosen not to be present in the stands of İstanbul Başakşehir anymore.

== Honours ==
=== Domestic ===
==== League ====
- Süper Lig
  - Winners: 2019–20
- 1. Lig
  - Winners: 2013–14
- 2. Lig
  - Winners: 1992–93, 1996–97

== Past seasons ==
=== Results of League and Cup Competitions by Season ===
Season	League table										Turkish Cup	UEFA			Top scorer	
Season	League	Pos	P	W	D	L	GF	GA	GD	Pts	Turkish Cup	UCL	UEL	UCL	Player	Goals
During the 1990–91 season, İstanbul BB competed at the amateur level.
1991–92	2. Lig	9th	34	10	13	11	35	37	−2	43	~~N/A.~~	DNQ			~~N/A.~~	~~N/A.~~
1992–93	2. Lig	1st↑	30	19	8	3	51	20	13	65	~~N/A.~~	DNQ			~~N/A.~~	~~N/A.~~
1993–94	1. Lig	6th	32	9	12	11	35	37	−2	39	R2	DNQ			~~N/A.~~	~~N/A.~~
1994–95	1. Lig	9th↓	32	8	10	14	35	46	−11	34	R3	DNQ			~~N/A.~~	~~N/A.~~
1995–96	2. Lig	3rd	26	14	8	4	49	22	27	50	N/A	DNQ			~~N/A.~~	~~N/A.~~
1996–97	2. Lig	1st↑	32	22	8	2	82	27	55	74	R2	DNQ			~~N/A.~~	~~N/A.~~
1997–98	1. Lig	3rd	35	18	8	9	62	45	17	62	R5	DNQ			~~N/A.~~	~~N/A.~~
1998–99	1. Lig	7th	36	16	7	13	65	52	13	55	R4	DNQ			~~N/A.~~	~~N/A.~~
1999–00	1. Lig	4th	32	15	9	8	47	32	15	54	R2	DNQ			~~N/A.~~	~~N/A.~~
2000–01	1. Lig	5th	37	19	7	11	80	57	23	64	R3	DNQ			Azad Akın	2
2001–02	1. Lig	12th	38	13	11	14	46	45	1	50	L32	DNQ			Ercan Agaçe	12
2002–03	1. Lig	14th	34	11	7	13	35	48	−13	40	R1	DNQ			Gökmen Ağbulak	10
2003–04	1. Lig	13th	34	10	7	14	42	50	−8	37	R2	DNQ			Birol Aksancak	16
2004–05	1. Lig	9th	34	12	10	12	34	35	−1	46	R1	DNQ			Volkan Glatt	6
2005–06	1. Lig	7th	34	13	13	8	43	31	12	52	R2	DNQ			Erol Kapusuz	13
2006–07	1. Lig	2nd↑	34	19	8	7	56	27	29	65	GS	DNQ			Ali Güzeldal	13
2007–08	Süper Lig	12th	34	10	8	16	44	47	−3	38	R2	DNQ			Necati Ateş	8
2008–09	Süper Lig	9th	34	12	6	16	37	46	−9	42	R2	DNQ			İbrahim Akın	6
2009–10	Süper Lig	6th	34	16	8	10	47	11	36	56	QF	DNQ			İskender Alın	11
2010–11	Süper Lig	12th	34	12	6	16	40	45	−5	42	RU	DNQ			İbrahim Akın	11
2011–12	Süper Lig	6th	34	14	8	12	48	49	−1	50	L16	DNQ			Pierre Webó	15
2012–13	Süper Lig	16th↓	34	9	9	16	43	50	−7	36	R2	DNQ			Samuel Holmén	11
2013–14	1. Lig	1st↑	36	24	6	6	76	38	+38	78	L32	DNQ			Mehmet Batdal	13
From this season onwards, the club is known as İstanbul Başakşehir Futbol Kulübü
2014–15	Süper Lig	4th	34	15	14	5	49	30	19	59	L16	DNQ			Semih Şentürk	11
2015–16	Süper Lig	4th	34	16	11	7	54	36	18	59	QF	–	3QR	–	Edin Višća	17
2016–17	Süper Lig	2nd	34	21	10	3	63	28	35	73	RU	–	PO	–	Edin Višća	10
2017–18	Süper Lig	3rd	34	22	6	6	62	34	28	72	L16	PO	GS	–	Emmanuel Adebayor	17
2018–19	Süper Lig	2nd	34	19	10	5	49	22	27	67	L16	–	3QR	–	Edin Višća	14
2019–20	Süper Lig	1st	34	20	9	5	65	34	31	69	L16	3QR	R16	–	Edin Višća	19
2020–21	Süper Lig	12th	40	12	12	16	43	55	−12	48	SF	GS	–	–	Fredrik Gulbrandsen	11
2021–22	Süper Lig	4th	38	19	8	11	56	36	20	65	R4	DNQ			Stefano Okaka	12
2022–23	Süper Lig	5th	36	18	8	10	54	37	17	62	RU	–	–	R16	Danijel Aleksic	14
2023–24	Süper Lig	4th	38	18	7	13	57	43	14	61	QF	DNQ			Krzysztof Piątek	17
2024–25	Süper Lig	5th	36	16	6	14	60	56	4	54	GS	–	–	LPh	Krzysztof Piątek	31
2025–26	Süper Lig	TBD														

=== League affiliation ===
- Süper Lig: 2007–13, 2014–
- 1. Lig: 1993–95, 1997–07, 2013–14
- 2. Lig: 1992–93, 1995–97

== European record ==
Başakşehir made their European debut in the 2015–16 Europa League and were eliminated in the third qualifying round by AZ Alkmaar (0–2 away, 1–2 home; 1–4 agg.).

In 2016–17 they beat HNK Rijeka on away goals (0–0 home, 2–2 away) before losing the play-off to Shakhtar Donetsk (1–2 home, 0–2 away; 1–4 agg.).

In 2017–18 they overcame Club Brugge in the third qualifying round (3–3 away, 2–0 home; 5–3 agg.) but lost the play-off to Sevilla (1–2 home, 2–2 away; 3–4 agg.), dropping into the Europa League where they finished third in Group C.

In 2018–19 they went out in the third qualifying round to Burnley after extra time (0–0 home, 0–1 a.e.t. away).

The club enjoyed its best European run in 2019–20: they won Group J ahead of Roma and Mönchengladbach (notable away win 2–1 in Germany), beat Sporting CP in the round of 32 (1–3 away, 4–1 a.e.t. home; 5–4 agg.), and were then eliminated by Copenhagen in the round of 16 (1–0 home, 0–3 away; 1–3 agg.).

As Turkish champions they entered the 2020–21 Champions League group stage (Group H with Paris Saint-Germain, RB Leipzig and Manchester United) and finished fourth; the highlight was a 2–1 home win over Manchester United.

In 2022–23 they advanced through qualifying (vs. Maccabi Netanya, Breiðablik and Antwerp), topped Group A ahead of Fiorentina and Hearts, and went out to Gent in the round of 16 (1–1 away, 1–4 home; 2–5 agg.).

In 2024–25 they cleared qualifying (vs. La Fiorita 10–1 agg., Iberia 1999 3–0 agg., St Patrick’s Athletic 2–0 agg.) and finished 26th in the new league-phase format; results included a 1–2 home loss to Rapid Wien, 5–1 defeat at Celje, a 2–2 draw with Copenhagen, a 1–1 draw with Petrocub, a 3–1 home win over Heidenheim and a 1–1 draw away to Cercle Brugge.

The 2025–26 campaign opened with a second qualifying round tie against Cherno More; Başakşehir won the first leg 1–0 before the return in Istanbul on 31 July 2025.

=== Competitive record ===
Accurate as of 28 August 2025

Competition	Pld	W	D	L	GF	GA	GD	Win%
UEFA Champions League	12	2	2	8	15	28	−13	16.67
UEFA Europa League	24	7	6	11	24	35	−11	29.17
UEFA Conference League	32	17	9	6	63	32	+31	53.13
Total	68	26	17	25	102	95	+7	38.24

Source: UEFA.com
Pld = Matches played; W = Matches won; D = Matches drawn; L = Matches lost; GF = Goals for; GA = Goals against; GD = Goal Difference.

=== Results ===
Season	Competition	Round	Club	Home	Away	Aggregate
2015–16	UEFA Europa League	3QR	(Netherlands) AZ	1–2	0–2	1–4
2016–17	UEFA Europa League	3QR	(Croatia) Rijeka	0–0	2–2	2–2 (a)
2016–17	UEFA Europa League	PO	(Ukraine) Shakhtar Donetsk	1–2	0–2	1–4
2017–18	UEFA Champions League	3QR	(Belgium) Club Brugge	2–0	3–3	5–3
2017–18	UEFA Champions League	PO	(Spain) Sevilla	1–2	2–2	3–4
2017–18	UEFA Europa League	Group C	(Portugal) Braga	2–1	1–2	3rd
2017–18	UEFA Europa League	Group C	(Bulgaria) Ludogorets Razgrad	0–0	2–1	3rd
2017–18	UEFA Europa League	Group C	(Germany) 1899 Hoffenheim	1–1	1–3	3rd
2018–19	UEFA Europa League	3QR	(England) Burnley	0–0	0–1	0–1
2019–20	UEFA Champions League	3QR	(Greece) Olympiacos	0–1	0–2	0–3
2019–20	UEFA Europa League	Group J	(Italy) Roma	0–3	0–4	1st
2019–20	UEFA Europa League	Group J	(Germany) Borussia Mönchengladbach	1–1	2–1	1st
2019–20	UEFA Europa League	Group J	(Austria) Wolfsberger AC	1–0	3–0	1st
2019–20	UEFA Europa League	R32	(Portugal) Sporting CP	4–1 (a.e.t.)	1–3	5–4
2019–20	UEFA Europa League	R16	(Denmark) Copenhagen	1–0	0–3	1–3
2020–21	UEFA Champions League	Group H	(France) Paris Saint-Germain	0–2	1–5	4th
2020–21	UEFA Champions League	Group H	(Germany) RB Leipzig	3–4	0–2	4th
2020–21	UEFA Champions League	Group H	(England) Manchester United	2–1	1–4	4th
2022–23	UEFA Europa Conference League	2QR	(Israel) Maccabi Netanya	1–1	1–0	2–1
2022–23	UEFA Europa Conference League	3QR	(Iceland) Breiðablik	3–0	3–1	6–1
2022–23	UEFA Europa Conference League	PO	(Belgium) Antwerp	1–1	3–1	4–2
2022–23	UEFA Europa Conference League	Group A	(Italy) Fiorentina	3–0	1–2	1st
2022–23	UEFA Europa Conference League	Group A	(Scotland) Heart of Midlothian	3–1	4–0	1st
2022–23	UEFA Europa Conference League	Group A	(Latvia) RFS	3–0	0–0	1st
2022–23	UEFA Europa Conference League	R16	(Belgium) Gent	1–4	1–1	2–5
2024–25	UEFA Conference League	2QR	(San Marino) La Fiorita	6–1	4–0	10–1
2024–25	UEFA Conference League	3QR	(Georgia (country)) Iberia 1999	2–0	1–0	3–0
2024–25	UEFA Conference League	PO	(Republic of Ireland) St Patrick's Athletic	2–0	0–0	2–0
2024–25	UEFA Conference League	League Phase	(Austria) Rapid Wien	1–2	—N/a	26th
2024–25	UEFA Conference League	League Phase	(Slovenia) Celje	—N/a	1–5	26th
2024–25	UEFA Conference League	League Phase	(Denmark) Copenhagen	—N/a	2–2	26th
2024–25	UEFA Conference League	League Phase	(Moldova) Petrocub Hîncești	1–1	—N/a	26th
2024–25	UEFA Conference League	League Phase	(Germany) 1. FC Heidenheim	3–1	—N/a	26th
2024–25	UEFA Conference League	League Phase	(Belgium) Cercle Brugge	—N/a	1–1	26th
2025–26	UEFA Conference League	2QR	(Bulgaria) Cherno More	4–0	1–0	5–0
2025–26	UEFA Conference League	3QR	(Norway) Viking	1–1	3–1	4–2
2025–26	UEFA Conference League	PO	(Romania) Universitatea Craiova	1–2	1–3	2–5
2026–27	UEFA Conference League	2QR	(Finland) Inter Turku	1–1	0–2	1–3

=== UEFA Ranking history ===
As of 8 November 2024

Position	Club	Coefficient
77	(Poland) Legia Warsaw	21.500
78	(Turkey) İstanbul Başakşehir	20.500
79	(Belgium) Royal Antwerp	20.500

Season	Rank	Points	Ref.
2016	194 ▲	7.920	
2017	158 ▲	10.340	
2018	140 ▲	8.500	
2019	118 ▲	10.500	
2020	71 ▲	21.500	
2021	60 ▲	26.500	
2022	63 ▼	25.000	
2023	56 ▲	31.000	
2024	62 ▼	29.000	

== Players ==
=== Current squad ===
As of 3 September 2026

Note: Flags indicate national team as defined under FIFA eligibility rules; some limited exceptions apply. Players may hold more than one non-FIFA nationality.

No.	Pos.	Nation	Player
1	GK	TUR	Volkan Babacan
3	DF	GHA	Jerome Opoku
4	MF	TUR	Onur Ergün
6	DF	TUR	Onur Bulut
7	MF	TUR	Yusuf Sarı
8	MF	CMR	Olivier Kemen
9	FW	GER	Davie Selke
10	MF	BIH	Edin Višća
11	MF	UZB	Abbosbek Fayzullaev
14	FW	UZB	Eldor Shomurodov
15	DF	TUR	Hamza Güreler
16	GK	TUR	Muhammed Şengezer
17	FW	TUR	Umut Bozok
18	MF	POL	Jakub Kałuziński
19	MF	TUR	Berkay Özcan

No.	Pos.	Nation	Player
20	MF	GER	Umut Güneş
21	DF	CIV	Christopher Opéri
23	DF	TUR	Emin Bayram
27	DF	SEN	Ousseynou Ba
33	DF	POL	Michał Karbownik
38	DF	GEO	Saba Kharebashvili
42	DF	TUR	Ömer Ali Şahiner (captain)
70	FW	DEN	Andreas Skov Olsen (on loan from VfL Wolfsburg)
77	FW	CRO	Ivan Brnić
80	GK	TUR	Ege Öztürk
91	FW	TUR	Bertuğ Yıldırım
98	GK	TUR	Deniz Dilmen
—	GK	TUR	Luca Stančić
—	DF	TUR	Efe Arda Koyuncu
—	FW	TUR	Batuhan Çelik

=== Out on loan ===
Note: Flags indicate national team as defined under FIFA eligibility rules; some limited exceptions apply. Players may hold more than one non-FIFA nationality.

No.	Pos.	Nation	Player
—	DF	TUR	Yağız Dilek (at Beyoğlu Yeni Çarşı until 30 June 2027)
—	DF	IRL	Festy Ebosele (at Erzurumspor until 30 June 2027)
—	DF	TUR	Onur İnan (at Kütahyaspor FSK until 30 June 2027)
—	DF	TUR	Eren Karaağaç (at Sebat Gençlikspor until 30 June 2027)
—	DF	TUR	Burak Sefa Kavraz (at 52 Orduspor until 30 June 2027)

No.	Pos.	Nation	Player
—	MF	TUR	Berkay Aslan (at Bodrum until 30 June 2027)
—	MF	CIV	Abdoulaye Yoro (at Dundee United until 30 June 2027)
—	FW	TUR	Berkay Aydoğmuş (at Güzide Gebzespor until 30 June 2027)
—	FW	TUR	Tuğra Turhan (at Stevenage until 30 June 2027)

== Non-playing staff ==
=== Administrative Staff ===
Position	Name
President	(Turkey) Göksel Gümüşdağ
General Manager	(Turkey) Tamer Güngör
Administrative Director	(Turkey) Murat Yaman
Administrative Manager	(Turkey) Barbaros Göznelı
Facilities Manager	(Turkey) Ali Fuat Şen
Financial Affairs Manager	(Turkey) Özay Aymak
Accounting Manager	(Turkey) Haci İbrahim Aslan
Administrative Officer	(Turkey) Tayfun Yağız Semiz
Administrative Officer	(Turkey) Metiner Keşaplı
Media & Communications	(Turkey) Gökhan Yılmaz
Photographer	(Turkey) Okan Karadağ
Commercial	(Turkey) Aslı Elif Koç Tiryaki
Licensing & Accreditation	(Turkey) Tugay Kurtgöz
IT Officer	(Turkey) Berat Turan
Ticketing Officer	(Turkey) Tolgay Karagöz
Store Manager	(Turkey) Erhan Saydam
Accounting Specialist	(Turkey) Sertaç Dağlı
Transportation	(Turkey) Hayrettin Yılmaz

=== Technical Staff ===
Position	Name
Head coach	Nuri Şahin
Assistant Coach	(Turkey) Mustafa Keçeli
Assistant Coach	(Turkey) Hasan Fırat
Assistant Coach	(Turkey) Murat Özkütükçü
Assistant Coach	(Turkey) Cemal Atan
Performance Coach	(Turkey) Emre Demirci
Performance Coach	(Turkey) Ersin Akilveren
Goalkeeping Coach	(Finland) Jarkko Tuomisto
Goalkeeping Coach	(Turkey) Murat Aslan
Goalkeeping Coach	(Turkey) Mesut Keke
Match Analyst	(Turkey) Serhan Erturhan
Match Analyst	(Turkey) Murat Özdemir

=== Medical and Support Staff ===
Position	Name
Chief Medical Advisor	(Turkey) Dr. Anıl Işık
Club Doctor	(Turkey) Dr. Armağan Aslan
Physiotherapist	(Turkey) Dr. Rıdvan Seyhan
Physio Specialist	(Turkey) Erdem Eray Aydın
Physio Specialist	(Turkey) Furkan Heyik
Masseur	(Turkey) Mehmet Ali Polat
Masseur	(Turkey) Emrah Albay
Masseur	(Turkey) Hasan Karahan
Specialist Dietitian	(Turkey) İsmail Cerrah
Performance Psych	(Turkey) Dr. Ertan Görgü
Translator	(Turkey) Salih Gürel Güreli
Translator	(Turkey) Feyyaz Ayhan Sezen
Equipment Manager	(Turkey) Nurdoğan Dursun
Equipment Manager	(Turkey) Kani Kurtgöz
Equipment Manager	(Turkey) Enes Yalçınkaya

== Managers ==
Since turning professional in 1994 the club has had numerous head coaches. The longest-serving is Abdullah Avcı, who managed the team in two spells (2006–2011 and 2014–2019) and departed in May 2019 after a combined tenure of roughly ten and a half years. Avcı was succeeded by Okan Buruk in June 2019; in his first season the club won its maiden Süper Lig title (2019–20). Aykut Kocaman took charge in February 2021 and left by mutual consent in October 2021. Former captain Emre Belözoğlu was appointed on 4 October 2021 and remained in post until September 2023. Çağdaş Atan was unveiled on 11 September 2023 on a 2+1-year deal, and in May 2025 the club announced a further two-year extension.

Season(s)	Name
1994–95	(Turkey) Recai Çaloğlu
1995	(Turkey) Cihat Erbil
1995–96	(Turkey) Turhan Özyazanlar
1996–00	(Turkey) Fahrettin Genç
2000–02	(Turkey) Ali Osman Renklibay
2002	(Turkey) Kadir Özcan
2002–03	(Turkey) Ekrem Al
2003–04	(Turkey) Ali Osman Renklibay
2004–05	(Turkey) Uğur Tütüneker
2005–06	(Turkey) Hüsnü Özkara
2006–11	(Turkey) Abdullah Avcı
2011–12	(Turkey) Arif Erdem
2012	(Portugal) Carlos Carvalhal
2012–13	(Turkey) Bülent Korkmaz
2013–14	(Turkey) Cihat Arslan
2014–19	(Turkey) Abdullah Avcı
2019–21	(Turkey) Okan Buruk
2021	(Turkey) Aykut Kocaman
2021–23	(Turkey) Emre Belözoğlu
2023–25	(Turkey) Çağdaş Atan
2025–	(Turkey) Nuri Şahin

== Presidents ==
In the İstanbul Büyükşehir Belediyespor era (1990–2014), the presidency was often held by the serving metropolitan mayor, with early office-holders including Nurettin Sözen, Recep Tayyip Erdoğan and Ali Müfit Gürtuna; later chairs included Nuri Albayrak, Osman Aşkın Bak and Göksel Gümüşdağ, followed by Çağatay Kalkancı (2011–2014). Gümüşdağ’s first spell as club chair ended in July 2011 when he became a vice-president of the Turkish Football Federation; an extraordinary general assembly then elected Çağatay Kalkancı as president of İstanbul BB. In 2014 the football branch was separated from the municipal multi-sport club and re-founded as İstanbul Başakşehir; Göksel Gümüşdağ became the founding chair and has served since 2014.

Season(s)	Name
1990–94	(Turkey) Nurettin Sözen
1994	(Turkey) Vural Akarçay
1994–00	(Turkey) Recep Tayyip Erdoğan
2000–02	(Turkey) Ali Müfit Gürtuna
2002–05	(Turkey) Nuri Albayrak
2002–06	(Turkey) Osman Aşkın Bak
2006–11	(Turkey) Göksel Gümüşdağ
2011–14	(Turkey) Çağatay Kalkancı
2014–	(Turkey) Göksel Gümüşdağ

== Player records ==
Başakşehir’s all-time appearance record belongs to Mahmut Tekdemir with 500 competitive matches; he is followed by long-serving winger Edin Višća (398) and goalkeeper Volkan Babacan (270), while foreign stalwarts Alexandru Epureanu (262) and Júnior Caiçara (200) also surpassed the 200-appearance mark. On the scoring side, the club’s all-time top scorer is Edin Višća with 109 competitive goals, ahead of Krzysztof Piątek (48), Doka Madureira (45), Mehmet Batdal (39), Danijel Aleksić (37), Deniz Türüç (29), Emmanuel Adebayor (28), İbrahim Akın (27), Samuel Holmén (27) and Demba Ba (26). The club’s first goal in UEFA competition was scored by Doka Madureira against AZ Alkmaar on 6 August 2015 at the Başakşehir Fatih Terim Stadium.

=== Most appearances ===
Competitive, professional matches only. Up to date as of May 5th 2025

Rank	Player	Years	League	Cup	Europe	Other	Total
1	(Turkey) Mahmut Tekdemir	2006–2024	426	38	36	0	500
2	(Bosnia and Herzegovina) Edin Višća	2011–2022	344	21	33	0	398
3	(Turkey) Volkan Babacan	2014–	231	20	19	0	270
4	(Moldova) Alexandru Epureanu	2014–2023	214	22	26	0	262
5	(Turkey) Berkay Özcan	2019–	166	17	34	0	217
6	(Turkey) Deniz Türüç	2020–	158	15	31	0	205
7	(Brazil) Júnior Caiçara	2017–2023	158	9	33	0	200
8	(Brazil) Doka Madureira	2011–2017	161	19	5	6	191
9	(Turkey) Ekrem Eksioglu	2006–2013	159	22	0	5	186
10	(Serbia) Danijel Aleksić	2019–2024	138	18	26	0	182

=== Top goalscorers ===
Competitive, professional matches only. Up to date as of May 5th 2025

Rank	Player	Years	League	Cup	Europe	Matches	Total
1	(Bosnia and Herzegovina) Edin Višća	2011–2022	94	1	14	397	109
2	(Poland) Krzysztof Piątek	2023–	38	1	9	81	48
3	(Brazil) Doka Madureira	2011–2017	37	2	1	191	45
4	(Turkey) Mehmet Batdal	2013–2018	31	8	0	126	39
5	(Serbia) Danijel Aleksić	2019–2024	27	4	6	182	37
6	(Turkey) Deniz Türüç	2020–	22	3	4	205	29
7	(Togo) Emmanuel Adebayor	2017–2019	24	3	1	76	28
8	(Turkey) Ibrahim Akin	2008–2011	24	3	0	104	27
9	(Sweden) Samuel Holmén	2010–2013; 2016–2017	22	4	0	139	27
10	(Senegal) Demba Ba	2018–2019	20	4	1	83	26

== Club records ==
- Biggest win: İstanbul Başakşehir 7–0 Turgutluspor (2020–21)
- Biggest defeat: İstanbul Başakşehir 0–7 Galatasaray (2022–23)
