= 2007–08 Fenerbahçe S.K. season =

Fenerbahçe
2007–08 season
- President: Aziz Yıldırım
- Head coach: Zico
- Stadium: Şükrü Saracoğlu Stadium
- Süper Lig: 2nd
- Turkish Cup: Quarter-finals
- Turkish Super Cup: Winners
- UEFA Champions League: Quarter-finals
- Top goalscorer: Semih Şentürk (17)
Home colours	Away colours	Third colours

During the 2007–08 Turkish football season, Fenerbahçe competed in the Süper Lig.

== Season summary ==
Fenerbahçe recorded their best-ever European performance as they reached the Champions League quarter-finals. However, they failed to retain the Süper Lig title. Coach Zico did not sign a contract extension, and resigned on June 10.

== Kit ==
Fenerbahçe's kit was manufactured by German apparel company Adidas and sponsored by Turkish telecommunications company Avea.

== First-team squad ==
Squad at end of season

Note: Flags indicate national team as defined under FIFA eligibility rules; some limited exceptions apply. Players may hold more than one non-FIFA nationality.

No.	Pos.	Nation	Player
1	GK	TUR	Volkan Demirel
2	DF	URU	Diego Lugano
3	DF	BRA	Roberto Carlos
4	MF	GHA	Stephen Appiah
5	DF	TUR	Yasin Çakmak
6	DF	BRA	Gökçek Vederson (Note: Vederson also holds Turkish citizenship.)
7	MF	TUR	Kemal Aslan
8	FW	TUR	Colin Kazim-Richards (Note: Kazim-Richards was born in Waltham Forest, England, but also qualified to represent Antigua and Barbuda through his father and Turkey through his mother and made his international debut for Turkey in March 2007.)
9	FW	SRB	Mateja Kežman
15	MF	TUR	Mehmet Aurélio (Note: Aurélio was born in Rio de Janeiro, Brazil, but also qualified to represent Turkey internationally and made his international debut for Turkey in August 2006.)
17	DF	TUR	Can Arat
18	MF	GER	Ali Bilgin
19	DF	TUR	Önder Turacı (Note: Turacı was born in Brussels, Belgium, and represented them at U-18, U-19, and U-21 level, but also qualified to represent Turkey through his parents and made his international debut for Turkey in August 2004.)
20	MF	BRA	Alex

No.	Pos.	Nation	Player
21	MF	TUR	Selçuk Şahin
22	GK	TUR	Serdar Kulbilge
23	FW	TUR	Semih Şentürk
24	MF	TUR	Deniz Barış
25	MF	TUR	Uğur Boral
32	MF	BUL	Gürhan Gürsoy
33	MF	CHI	Claudio Maldonado
36	DF	BRA	Edu Dracena
38	FW	TUR	İlhan Parlak
77	DF	TUR	Gökhan Gönül
85	DF	TUR	Uğur Arslan Kuru
88	GK	TUR	Volkan Babacan
89	GK	TUR	Mert Günok
99	FW	BRA	Deivid

=== Left club during season ===
Note: Flags indicate national team as defined under FIFA eligibility rules; some limited exceptions apply. Players may hold more than one non-FIFA nationality.

No.	Pos.	Nation	Player
11	MF	TUR	Tümer Metin (on loan to Larissa)

== Süper Lig ==
Pos	Team	Pld	W	D	L	GF	GA	GD	Pts	Qualification or relegation
1	Galatasaray (C)	34	24	7	3	64	23	+41	79	Qualification to Champions League third qualifying round
2	Fenerbahçe	34	22	7	5	72	37	+35	73 (Note: Fenerbahçe were ahead of Beşiktaş and Sivasspor on head-to-head points and Beşiktaş were ahead of Sivasspor on head-to-head goal difference: Fenerbahçe: 12 pts; Beşiktaş: 3 pts, 5–7 (–2); Sivasspor: 3 pts, 4–8 (–4).)	Qualification to Champions League second qualifying round
3	Beşiktaş	34	23	4	7	58	32	+26	73	Qualification to UEFA Cup second qualifying round
4	Sivasspor	34	23	4	7	57	29	+28	73	Qualification to Intertoto Cup second round
5	Kayserispor	34	15	10	9	50	31	+19	55	Qualification to UEFA Cup first round (Note: Kayserispor have won the 2007–08 Turkish Cup competition and thus are qualified for the first round of the UEFA Cup.)

Rules for classification: 1) points; 2) goal difference; 3) number of goals scored.
(C) Champions

== Champions League ==
=== Third qualifying round ===
15 August 2007 First leg	Fenerbahçe (Turkey)	1–0	(Belgium) Anderlecht	Istanbul, Turkey
20:00	Alex 32'	Report		Stadium: Şükrü Saracoğlu Stadium; Referee: Howard Webb (England)

29 August 2007 Second leg	Anderlecht (Belgium)	0–2 (0–3 agg.)	(Turkey) Fenerbahçe	Anderlecht, Belgium
20:30		Report	Kežman 4'; Alex 73'	Stadium: Constant Vanden Stock Stadium; Referee: Massimo Busacca (Switzerland)

=== Group stage ===
Pos	Team	Pld	W	D	L	GF	GA	GD	Pts	Qualification	INT	FEN	PSV	CSKA
1	(Italy) Internazionale	6	5	0	1	12	4	+8	15	Advance to knockout stage	—	3–0	2–0	4–2
2	(Turkey) Fenerbahçe	6	3	2	1	8	6	+2	11	Advance to knockout stage	1–0	—	2–0	3–1
3	(Netherlands) PSV Eindhoven	6	2	1	3	3	6	−3	7	Transfer to UEFA Cup	0–1	0–0	—	2–1
4	(Russia) CSKA Moscow	6	0	1	5	7	14	−7	1		1–2	2–2	0–1	—

Source: RSSSF

19 September 2007 1	Fenerbahçe (Turkey)	1–0	(Italy) Internazionale	Istanbul, Turkey
20:45	Deivid 43'	Report MatchCentre		Stadium: Şükrü Saracoğlu Stadium; Attendance: 44,212; Referee: Luis Medina Cantalejo (Spain)

2 October 2007 2	CSKA Moscow (Russia)	2–2	(Turkey) Fenerbahçe	Moscow, Russia
18:30	Krasić 48'; Vágner Love 53' (pen.)	Report MatchCentre	Alex 9'; Deivid 86'	Stadium: Lokomotiv Stadium; Attendance: 25,000; Referee: Knut Kircher (Germany)

23 October 2007 3	PSV (Netherlands)	0–0	(Turkey) Fenerbahçe	Eindhoven, Netherlands
20:45		Report MatchCentre		Stadium: Philips Stadion; Attendance: 35,000; Referee: Howard Webb (England)

7 November 2007 4	Fenerbahçe (Turkey)	2–0	(Netherlands) PSV	Istanbul, Turkey
20:45	Marcellis 28' (o.g.); Şentürk 30'	Report MatchCentre		Stadium: Şükrü Saracoğlu Stadium; Attendance: 46,229; Referee: Alain Hamer (Luxembourg)

27 November 2007 5	Internazionale (Italy)	3–0	(Turkey) Fenerbahçe	Milan, Italy
20:45	Cruz 55'; Ibrahimović 66'; Jiménez 90+2'	Report MatchCentre		Stadium: San Siro; Attendance: 24,736; Referee: Konrad Plautz (Austria)

12 December 2007 6	Fenerbahçe (Turkey)	3–1	(Russia) CSKA Moscow	Istanbul, Turkey
20:45	Alex 32'; Boral 45+1', 90'	Report MatchCentre	Edu Dracena 30' (o.g.)	Stadium: Şükrü Saracoğlu Stadium; Attendance: 45,745; Referee: Matteo Trefoloni (Italy)

=== Round of 16 ===
20 February 2008 First leg	Fenerbahçe (Turkey)	3–2	(Spain) Sevilla	Istanbul, Turkey
20:45	Kežman 17'; Lugano 57'; Şentürk 87'	Report	Edu Dracena 23' (o.g.); Escudé 66'	Stadium: Şükrü Saracoğlu Stadium; Attendance: 46,210; Referee: Florian Meyer (Germany)

4 March 2008 Second leg	Sevilla (Spain)	3–2 (a.e.t.) (5–5 agg.) (2–3 p)	(Turkey) Fenerbahçe	Seville, Spain
20:45	Alves 6'; Keita 9'; Kanouté 41'	Report	Deivid 21', 80'	Stadium: Ramón Sánchez Pizjuán Stadium; Attendance: 38,626; Referee: Massimo Busacca (Switzerland)
	Penalties
	Kanouté (penalty scored); Escudé (penalty missed); Dragutinović (penalty scored); Maresca (penalty missed); Alves (penalty missed)		(penalty scored) Vederson; (penalty missed) Edu Dracena; (penalty scored) Aurélio; (penalty scored) Kežman

=== Quarter-finals ===
2 April 2008 First leg	Fenerbahçe (Turkey)	2–1	(England) Chelsea	Istanbul, Turkey
20:45	Kazim-Richards 65'; Deivid 81'	Report	Deivid 13' (o.g.)	Stadium: Şükrü Saracoğlu Stadium; Attendance: 49,055; Referee: Claus Bo Larsen (Denmark)

8 April 2008 Second leg	Chelsea (England)	2–0 (3–2 agg.)	(Turkey) Fenerbahçe	London, England
20:45	Ballack 4'; Lampard 87'	Report		Stadium: Stamford Bridge; Attendance: 38,369; Referee: Herbert Fandel (Germany)
