= 2015–16 Süper Lig =

58th season of top-tier Turkish football

Süper Lig
- Season: 2015–16
- Champions: Beşiktaş; 14th title
- Relegated: Sivasspor; Eskişehirspor; Mersin İdman Yurdu
- Champions League: Beşiktaş; Fenerbahçe
- Europa League: Konyaspor; İstanbul Başakşehir; Osmanlıspor
- Matches: 306
- Goals: 827 (2.7 per match)
- Top goalscorer: Mario Gómez (26 goals)
- Biggest home win: Antalyaspor 7–0 Trabzonspor (13 May 2016); Kasımpaşa 7–0 Mersin İdman Yurdu (15 May 2016)
- Biggest away win: Trabzonspor 0–6 Kasımpaşa (19 May 2016)
- Highest scoring: Mersin İdman Yurdu 2–5 Beşiktaş (16 August 2015); Çaykur Rizespor 4–3 Galatasaray (7 November 2015); Eskişehirspor 4–3 Galatasaray (2 April 2016); Antalyaspor 7–0 Trabzonspor (13 May 2016); Kasımpaşa 7–0 Mersin İdman Yurdu (15 May 2016)
- Longest winning run: Beşiktaş (7 matches)
- Longest unbeaten run: Osmanlıspor (14 matches)
- Longest winless run: Sivasspor; Eskişehirspor; Kayserispor; Gaziantepspor; Mersin İdmanyurdu (10 matches)
- Longest losing run: Eskişehirspor (9 matches)
- Highest attendance: 45,070; Fenerbahçe 1–1 Galatasaray
- Total attendance: 2,578,561
- Average attendance: 8,427

The 2015–16 Süper Lig, officially called the Spor Toto Süper Lig Hasan Doğan season, was the 58th season of the Süper Lig, the highest tier football league of Turkey.

The season was named after Hasan Doğan, a former president of the Turkish Football Federation, who died in 2008.

== Teams ==
- Kayserispor, Osmanlıspor and Antalyaspor promoted from 2014–15 TFF First League.
- Balıkesirspor, Karabükspor and Kayseri Erciyesspor relegated to 2015–16 TFF First League.

=== Stadia and locations ===
Location of teams in 2015–16 Süper Lig
Istanbul Süper Lig football clubs

Team	Home city	Stadium	Capacity
Akhisar Belediyespor	Manisa	Manisa 19 Mayıs Stadium	16,597
Antalyaspor	Antalya	Antalya Arena	33,032
Beşiktaş	Istanbul	Vodafone Park	41,903
Bursaspor	Bursa	Timsah Arena	43,877
Çaykur Rizespor	Rize	Yeni Rize Şehir Stadı	15,485
Eskişehirspor	Eskişehir	Eskişehir Atatürk Stadium	13,520
Fenerbahçe	Istanbul	Ülker Stadium	50,509
Galatasaray	Istanbul	Türk Telekom Arena	52,652
Gaziantepspor	Gaziantep	Kamil Ocak Stadium	16,981
Gençlerbirliği	Ankara	Ankara 19 Mayıs Stadium	19,209
İstanbul Başakşehir	Istanbul	Başakşehir Fatih Terim Stadium	17,800
Kasımpaşa	Istanbul	Recep Tayyip Erdoğan Stadium	14,234
Kayserispor	Kayseri	Kadir Has Stadium	32,864
Konyaspor	Konya	Torku Arena	42,276
Mersin İdman Yurdu	Mersin	Mersin Arena	25,534
Osmanlıspor	Ankara	Osmanlı Stadyumu	19,626
Sivasspor	Sivas	Sivas 4 Eylül Stadium	14,998
Trabzonspor	Trabzon	Hüseyin Avni Aker Stadium	24,169

=== Personnel and sponsorship ===
Team	Head coach	Captain	Kit manufacturer	Sponsor
Akhisar Belediyespor	(Turkey) Cihat Arslan	(Portugal) Custódio	Nike	
Antalyaspor	(Portugal) José Morais	(Cameroon) Samuel Eto'o	Nike	IATI
Beşiktaş	(Turkey) Şenol Güneş	(Turkey) Tolga Zengin	Adidas	Vodafone
Bursaspor	(Turkey) Hamza Hamzaoğlu	(Turkey) Serdar Aziz	Puma	Marmarabirlik
Çaykur Rizespor	(Turkey) Hikmet Karaman	(Turkey) Sercan Kaya	Lotto	Çaykur
Eskişehirspor	(Turkey) Samet Aybaba	(Turkey) Sezgin Coşkun	Nike	ETİ
Fenerbahçe	(Portugal) Vítor Pereira	(Turkey) Volkan Demirel	Adidas	Yandex
Galatasaray	(Netherlands) Jan Olde Riekerink	(Turkey) Selçuk İnan	Nike	
Gaziantepspor	(Turkey) Mutlu Topçu	(Turkey) Elyasa Süme	Adidas	Turkish Oil
Gençlerbirliği	(Turkey) İbrahim Üzülmez	(Turkey) Doğa Kaya	Lotto	İCK
İstanbul Başakşehir	(Turkey) Abdullah Avcı	(Turkey) Emre Belözoğlu	Nike	Makro
Kasımpaşa	(Turkey) Rıza Çalımbay	(Turkey) Adem Büyük	Nike	Park Cam
Kayserispor	(Turkey) Hakan Kutlu	(Montenegro) Marko Simić	Adidas	İstikbal
Konyaspor	(Turkey) Aykut Kocaman	(Turkey) Ali Çamdalı	Hummel	Torku
Mersin İdman Yurdu		(Turkey) Serkan Balcı	Adidas	Arbella Makarna
Osmanlıspor	(Turkey) Mustafa Reşit Akçay	(Germany) Erdal Kılıçaslan	Lotto	ATG
Sivasspor	(Turkey) Mesut Bakkal	(Turkey) Adem Koçak	Adidas	Marka
Trabzonspor	(Turkey) Hami Mandıralı	(Turkey) Onur Kıvrak	Nike	

=== Managerial changes ===
Team	Outgoing manager	Manner of departure	Date of vacancy	Position in table	Replaced by	Date of appointment
Gençlerbirliği	(Turkey) Mesut Bakkal	Resigned	23 May 2015	Last season	(Scotland) Stuart Baxter	9 June 2015
Beşiktaş	(Croatia) Slaven Bilić	Contract expired	30 May 2015	Pre-season	(Turkey) Şenol Güneş	11 June 2015
Fenerbahçe	(Turkey) İsmail Kartal	Resigned	30 May 2015	Pre-season	(Portugal) Vítor Pereira	11 June 2015
Kayserispor	(Turkey) Cüneyt Dumlupınar	Contract expired	31 May 2015	Pre-season	(Turkey) Tolunay Kafkas	7 July 2015
Akhisar Belediyespor	(Brazil) Roberto Carlos	Contract termination	1 June 2015	Pre-season	(Turkey) Cihat Arslan	15 June 2015
Bursaspor	(Turkey) Şenol Güneş	Contract expired	4 June 2015	Pre-season	(Turkey) Ertuğrul Sağlam	7 June 2015
Gaziantepspor	(Turkey) Okan Buruk	Contract termination	7 June 2015	Pre-season	(Turkey) Mutlu Topçu	3 July 2015
Kasımpaşa	(Turkey) Önder Özen	Mutual agreement	26 June 2015	Pre-season	(Turkey) Rıza Çalımbay	6 July 2015
Mersin İdman Yurdu	(Turkey) Rıza Çalımbay	Resigned	28 June 2015	Pre-season	(Turkey) Mesut Bakkal	1 July 2015
Trabzonspor	(Turkey) Ersun Yanal	Resigned	1 July 2015	Pre-season	(Georgia (country)) Shota Arveladze	3 July 2015
Osmanlıspor	(Turkey) Uğur Tütüneker	Resigned	7 July 2015	Pre-season	(Turkey) Mustafa Reşit Akçay	13 July 2015
Gençlerbirliği	(Scotland) Stuart Baxter	Mutual agreement	25 August 2015	13th	(Turkey) Mehmet Özdilek	1 September 2015
Mersin İdman Yurdu	(Turkey) Mesut Bakkal	Resigned	18 September 2015	18th	(Turkey) Bülent Korkmaz	22 September 2015
Eskişehirspor	(Germany) Michael Skibbe	Mutual agreement	10 October 2015	17th	(Turkey) İsmail Kartal	11 October 2015
Sivasspor	(Turkey) Sergen Yalçın	Contract termination	24 October 2015	16th	(Turkey) Okan Buruk	25 October 2015
Trabzonspor	(Georgia (country)) Shota Arveladze	Mutual agreement	11 November 2015	12th	(Turkey) Sadi Tekelioğlu	11 November 2015
Eskişehirspor	(Turkey) İsmail Kartal	Resigned	12 November 2015	18th	(Turkey) Samet Aybaba	17 November 2015
Galatasaray	(Turkey) Hamza Hamzaoğlu	Sacked	19 November 2015	3rd	(Turkey) Mustafa Denizli	26 November 2015
Bursaspor	(Turkey) Ertuğrul Sağlam	Mutual agreement	27 November 2015	12th	(Turkey) Hamza Hamzaoğlu	17 December 2015
Antalyaspor	(Turkey) Yusuf Şimşek	Sacked	7 December 2015	10th	(Portugal) José Morais	6 January 2016
Gençlerbirliği	(Turkey) Mehmet Özdilek	Mutual agreement	13 December 2015	16th	(Turkey) Yılmaz Vural	24 December 2015
Gençlerbirliği	(Turkey) Yılmaz Vural	Sacked	29 December 2015	16th	(Turkey) İbrahim Üzülmez	31 December 2015
Mersin İdman Yurdu	(Turkey) Bülent Korkmaz	Sacked	3 January 2016	17th	(Turkey) Hakan Kutlu	5 January 2016
Mersin İdman Yurdu	(Turkey) Hakan Kutlu	Resigned	6 January 2016	17th	(Turkey) Nurullah Sağlam	12 January 2016
Mersin İdman Yurdu	(Turkey) Nurullah Sağlam	Resigned	14 January 2016	17th	(Turkey) Ümit Özat	17 January 2016
Trabzonspor	(Turkey) Sadi Tekelioğlu	Resigned	20 January 2016	10th	(Turkey) Hami Mandıralı	21 January 2016
Sivasspor	(Turkey) Okan Buruk	Resigned	6 February 2016	16th	(Turkey) Mesut Bakkal	6 February 2016
Galatasaray	(Turkey) Mustafa Denizli	Resigned	1 March 2016	5th	(Netherlands) Jan Olde Riekerink	16 March 2016
Kayserispor	(Turkey) Tolunay Kafkas	Resigned	3 March 2016	15th	(Turkey) Hakan Kutlu	8 March 2016
Gaziantepspor	(Turkey) Mutlu Topçu	Mutual agreement	26 April 2016	14th	(Turkey) Sergen Yalçın	30 April 2016
Mersin İdman Yurdu	(Turkey) Ümit Özat	Mutual agreement	5 May 2016	18th		
Trabzonspor	(Turkey) Hami Mandıralı	Sacked	13 May 2016	12th		

=== Foreign players ===
Club	Player 1	Player 2	Player 3	Player 4	Player 5	Player 6	Player 7	Player 8	Player 9	Player 10	Player 11	Player 12	Player 13	Player 14	Former Players
Akhisar Belediyespor	(Brazil) Bruno Mezenga	(Brazil) Douglão	(Cameroon) Landry Nguémo	(Colombia) Hugo Rodallega	(Guinea-Bissau) Sami	(Montenegro) Petar Grbić	(Portugal) Custódio	(Portugal) Ricardo Vaz Tê	(Serbia) Milan Lukač						(Democratic Republic of the Congo) Lomana LuaLua
Antalyaspor	(Algeria) Raïs M'Bolhi	(Brazil) Charles	(Brazil) Chico	(Brazil) Danilo	(Brazil) Diego Ângelo	(Brazil) Ramon Motta	(Cameroon) Jean Makoun	(Cameroon) Lionel Enguene	(Cameroon) Mbilla Etame	(Cameroon) Samuel Eto'o	(Czech Republic) Ondřej Čelůstka	(Ghana) Samuel Inkoom	(Slovenia) Dejan Lazarević	(Slovenia) Sašo Fornezzi	(Bosnia and Herzegovina) Josip Kvesić (Brazil) Guilherme (Senegal) Lamine Diarra
Beşiktaş	(Argentina) José Sosa	(Brazil) Marcelo	(Brazil) Rhodolfo	(Canada) Atiba Hutchinson	(Germany) Andreas Beck	(Germany) Mario Gómez	(Serbia) Duško Tošić	(Spain) Alexis	(Portugal) Ricardo Quaresma	(Ukraine) Denys Boyko					(Brazil) Ramon Motta (Colombia) Pedro Franco (Sweden) Alexander Milošević
Bursaspor	(Argentina) Pablo Batalla	(Belgium) Tom De Sutter	(Cameroon) Dany Nounkeu	(Chile) Cristóbal Jorquera	(Czech Republic) Tomáš Necid	(Czech Republic) Tomáš Sivok	(Hungary) Balázs Dzsudzsák	(Japan) Hajime Hosogai	(Mali) Bakaye Traoré	(Senegal) Ricardo Faty	(Slovakia) Miroslav Stoch				(Peru) Luis Advíncula (Portugal) Josué (Spain) Isaac Cuenca
Çaykur Rizespor	(Cameroon) Charles Itandje	(Cameroon) Léonard Kweuke	(Democratic Republic of the Congo) Cédric Makiadi	(France) Ludovic Sylvestre	(France) Teddy Chevalier	(Georgia (country)) Nika Dzalamidze	(Iraq) Dhurgham Ismail	(Ivory Coast) Ousmane Viera	(Nigeria) Godfrey Oboabona	(Poland) Patryk Tuszyński					
Eskişehirspor	(Belgium) Ruud Boffin	(Bosnia and Herzegovina) Anel Hadžić	(Cyprus) Dossa Júnior	(Democratic Republic of the Congo) Jeremy Bokila	(Gabon) Axel Méyé	(Georgia (country)) Tornike Okriashvili	(Serbia) Goran Čaušić	(Spain) Jordi Figueras	(Ukraine) Vladyslav Kulach						(Argentina) Matías Defederico (Chile) Sebastián Pinto (Democratic Republic of the Congo) Cédric Mongongu (Democratic Republic of the Congo) Nzuzi Toko (Ghana) Jerry Akaminko (Greece) Theofanis Gekas (Nigeria) Raheem Lawal (Switzerland) Nassim Ben Khalifa
Fenerbahçe	(Brazil) Diego	(Brazil) Fabiano	(Brazil) Fernandão	(Brazil) Souza	(Czech Republic) Michal Kadlec	(Denmark) Simon Kjær	(Netherlands) Robin van Persie	(Portugal) Bruno Alves	(Portugal) Nani	(Portugal) Raul Meireles	(Senegal) Abdoulaye Ba	(Serbia) Lazar Marković			(Senegal) Moussa Sow
Galatasaray	(Belgium) Jason Denayer	(Cameroon) Aurélien Chedjou	(France) Lionel Carole	(Germany) Lukas Podolski	(Netherlands) Ryan Donk	(Netherlands) Wesley Sneijder	(Norway) Martin Linnes	(Spain) José Rodríguez	(Uruguay) Fernando Muslera						(Brazil) Alex Telles (Brazil) Felipe Melo (Germany) Kevin Großkreutz
Gaziantepspor	(Belarus) Anton Putsila	(Brazil) Abuda	(Brazil) Fernando Marçal	(Central African Republic) Habib Habibou	(France) Prince-Désir Gouano	(Lithuania) Žydrūnas Karčemarskas	(Nigeria) Gbenga Arokoyo	(Nigeria) John Chibuike	(Sweden) Daniel Larsson						(Bosnia and Herzegovina) Ognjen Vranješ (Guinea) Demba Camara
Gençlerbirliği	(Angola) Djalma	(Belarus) Alexander Hleb	(Belarus) Sergey Politevich	(Croatia) Ante Kulušić	(Denmark) Martin Spelmann	(Guinea) Guy-Michel Landel	(Iceland) Ólafur Ingi Skúlason	(Morocco) Moestafa El Kabir	(Romania) Iasmin Latovlevici	(Romania) Bogdan Stancu	(Sweden) Johannes Hopf	(Sweden) Panajotis Dimitriadis			(Ethiopia) Walid Atta (Serbia) Nemanja Tomić
İstanbul Başakşehir	(Albania) Sokol Cikalleshi	(Bosnia and Herzegovina) Edin Višća	(Brazil) Doka Madureira	(Brazil) Márcio Mossoró	(Italy) Stefano Napoleoni	(Moldova) Alexandru Epureanu	(Nigeria) Musa Muhammed	(Slovenia) Rajko Rotman							(Senegal) Stéphane Badji
Kasımpaşa	(Argentina) Óscar Scarione	(Brazil) Titi	(Bulgaria) Strahil Popov	(Bulgaria) Vasil Bozhikov	(Czech Republic) David Pavelka	(France) Olivier Veigneau	(Guinea) Bengali-Fodé Koita	(Nigeria) Kenneth Omeruo	(Portugal) André Castro	(Sweden) Andreas Isaksson	(Venezuela) Yonathan Del Valle				(Netherlands) Ryan Donk
Kayserispor	(Brazil) Derley	(Brazil) Diego Lopes	(Brazil) William Alves	(Comoros) Ali Ahamada	(Democratic Republic of the Congo) Larrys Mabiala	(Mali) Samba Sow	(Montenegro) Marko Simić	(Morocco) Adnane Tighadouini	(Netherlands) Diego Biseswar	(Nigeria) Yakubu	(Serbia) Srđan Mijailović				
Konyaspor	(Albania) Alban Meha	(Bosnia and Herzegovina) Amir Hadžiahmetović	(Bosnia and Herzegovina) Riad Bajić	(Bulgaria) Dimitar Rangelov	(Burkina Faso) Abdou Traoré	(Cameroon) Marc Mbamba	(Czech Republic) Tomáš Borek	(Ivory Coast) Ibrahim Sissoko	(Scotland) Barry Douglas	(Serbia) Jagoš Vuković	(Slovenia) Nejc Skubic	(Sweden) Samuel Holmén			(Cyprus) Dossa Júnior (Romania) Ciprian Marica (Portugal) Mário Felgueiras
Mersin İdman Yurdu	(Bolivia) Ricardo Pedriel	(Brazil) Welliton	(Burkina Faso) Préjuce Nakoulma	(Kosovo) Loret Sadiku	(Hungary) Márkó Futács	(Serbia) Milan Mitrović	(Sweden) Abdul Khalili								(Bulgaria) Nikolay Mihaylov
Osmanlıspor	(Bosnia and Herzegovina) Avdija Vršajević	(Brazil) Artur Moraes	(Cameroon) Pierre Webó	(Croatia) Anas Sharbini	(Czech Republic) Václav Procházka	(Nigeria) Aminu Umar	(Nigeria) Raheem Lawal	(Poland) Łukasz Szukała	(Portugal) Tiago Pinto	(Republic of the Congo) Dzon Delarge	(Romania) Gabriel Torje	(Romania) Raul Rusescu	(Senegal) Badou Ndiaye		(Ivory Coast) Bakary Soro (Japan) Takayuki Seto (Liberia) Tonia Tisdell
Sivasspor	(Brazil) Cicinho	(Burkina Faso) Djakaridja Koné	(Ghana) John Boye	(Lebanon) Joan Oumari	(Lithuania) Ernestas Šetkus	(Morocco) Aatif Chahechouhe	(Morocco) Mehdi Taouil	(Norway) Etzaz Hussain	(Romania) Cristian Tănase	(Uruguay) David Texeira					(Argentina) Jerónimo Barrales (Nigeria) Michael Eneramo (Spain) Dani Abalo
Trabzonspor	(Belgium) Luis Pedro Cavanda	(Brazil) Douglas	(Costa Rica) Esteban Alvarado	(Germany) Marko Marin	(Paraguay) Óscar Cardozo	(Portugal) José Bosingwa	(Togo) Serge Akakpo								(Algeria) Carl Medjani (Cameroon) Stéphane Mbia (Guinea) Kévin Constant (Senegal) Dame N'Doye

== League table ==
Pos	Team	Pld	W	D	L	GF	GA	GD	Pts	Qualification or relegation
1	Beşiktaş (C)	34	25	4	5	75	35	+40	79	Qualification for the Champions League group stage
2	Fenerbahçe	34	22	8	4	60	27	+33	74	Qualification for the Champions League third qualifying round
3	Konyaspor	34	19	9	6	44	33	+11	66	Qualification for the Europa League group stage (Note: Since the winners of the 2015–16 Turkish Cup, Galatasaray, were excluded from European competitions by UEFA, the Europa League group stage berth awarded to the Turkish Cup winners was transferred to the third-placed team (Konyaspor), the third qualifying round berth was awarded to the fourth-placed team (İstanbul Başakşehir), and the second qualifying round berth was awarded to the fifth-placed team (Osmanlıspor).)
4	İstanbul Başakşehir	34	16	11	7	54	36	+18	59	Qualification for the Europa League third qualifying round
5	Osmanlıspor	34	14	10	10	52	36	+16	52	Qualification for the Europa League second qualifying round
6	Galatasaray (Note: Galatasaray would have qualified for the Europa League group stage by winning the 2015–16 Turkish Cup, but were excluded by the Adjudicatory Chamber of the UEFA Club Financial Control Body (CFCB).)	34	13	12	9	69	49	+20	51	
7	Kasımpaşa	34	14	8	12	50	40	+10	50	
8	Akhisar Belediyespor	34	11	13	10	42	41	+1	46	
9	Antalyaspor	34	12	9	13	53	52	+1	45	
10	Gençlerbirliği	34	13	6	15	42	42	0	45	
11	Bursaspor	34	13	5	16	47	55	−8	44	
12	Trabzonspor	34	12	4	18	40	59	−19	40	
13	Çaykur Rizespor	34	9	10	15	39	48	−9	37	
14	Gaziantepspor	34	9	9	16	31	50	−19	36	
15	Kayserispor	34	7	13	14	25	41	−16	34	
16	Sivasspor (R)	34	6	13	15	34	48	−14	31	Relegation to TFF First League
17	Eskişehirspor (R)	34	8	6	20	39	64	−25	30	Relegation to TFF First League
18	Mersin İdman Yurdu (R)	34	5	6	23	31	71	−40	21	Relegation to TFF First League

Source: Süper Lig, Soccerway
Rules for classification: 1) Points; 2) Head-to-head points; 3) Head-to-head goal difference; 4) Head-to-head goals scored; 5) Goal difference; 6) Goals scored; 7) Play-off.
(C) Champions; (R) Relegated

== Results ==
Home \ Away	AKH	ANT	BEŞ	BUR	ÇAY	ESK	FEN	GAL	GAZ	GEN	BAŞ	KSM	KAY	KON	MİY	OSM	SİV	TRA
Akhisar Belediyespor		2–1	3–3	3–1	1–1	1–0	0–3	1–2	0–0	1–0	0–0	0–1	1–1	0–2	2–0	0–0	1–0	2–1
Antalyaspor	2–2		1–5	3–0	2–1	2–0	4–2	4–2	0–0	3–1	1–2	0–0	1–1	1–0	3–2	1–1	1–1	7–0
Beşiktaş	0–2	1–0		3–2	1–0	3–1	3–2	2–1	4–0	1–0	2–0	3–3	4–0	4–0	1–0	3–1	2–0	1–2
Bursaspor	0–2	0–2	0–1		1–0	2–0	0–0	1–1	0–1	3–2	3–3	4–1	1–2	1–1	2–1	0–4	1–0	4–2
Çaykur Rizespor	0–2	5–1	1–2	2–3		1–1	1–1	4–3	1–0	2–3	2–1	2–0	0–0	0–0	2–0	0–1	1–1	3–0
Eskişehirspor	3–3	3–2	1–2	0–1	1–1		0–3	4–3	1–2	2–0	1–2	0–3	1–3	1–2	3–2	0–2	4–2	1–0
Fenerbahçe	2–2	2–1	2–0	2–1	2–1	2–0		1–1	3–0	2–1	1–0	3–1	1–0	1–0	4–1	0–0	2–1	2–0
Galatasaray	3–2	3–3	0–1	3–0	1–1	4–0	0–0		2–1	4–1	3–3	4–1	6–0	0–0	1–1	1–2	3–1	2–1
Gaziantepspor	0–1	2–0	0–4	2–3	2–0	1–1	2–2	2–0		1–3	0–1	0–3	1–0	0–1	1–0	2–1	0–1	0–1
Gençlerbirliği	3–1	1–0	1–1	2–0	2–3	3–1	0–1	1–1	2–2		0–0	1–0	2–0	0–1	1–1	1–0	0–1	3–1
İstanbul Başakşehir	2–0	2–3	2–2	2–1	1–0	2–1	2–1	0–2	4–1	2–0		1–1	1–0	4–0	3–0	2–3	2–2	1–0
Kasımpaşa	2–1	2–1	2–1	0–1	1–1	2–1	0–1	2–2	1–2	0–1	1–0		1–2	2–1	7–0	1–1	2–1	1–1
Kayserispor	3–2	0–0	1–2	2–1	0–0	0–0	0–1	1–1	2–2	0–2	0–1	0–0		1–1	0–1	1–0	1–1	0–1
Konyaspor	1–1	3–2	2–1	1–0	3–1	3–2	2–1	1–4	2–1	0–0	1–1	2–0	1–0		2–0	1–1	2–1	2–0
Mersin İdman Yurdu	0–0	0–1	2–5	2–5	3–0	1–2	1–3	2–1	0–0	1–3	1–1	1–2	1–2	0–2		0–4	1–0	3–2
Osmanlıspor	1–0	3–0	2–3	3–3	0–1	0–0	0–1	3–2	1–1	3–1	0–3	0–1	1–1	1–2	3–1		4–0	3–1
Sivasspor	1–1	0–0	1–2	1–2	2–1	1–2	2–2	2–2	3–0	2–1	2–2	1–0	0–0	0–0	2–2	1–1		0–2
Trabzonspor	2–2	3–0	0–2	1–0	6–0	3–1	0–4	0–1	2–2	1–0	1–1	0–6	2–1	1–2	1–0	1–2	1–0	

Source: tff.org (in Turkish)
Legend: Blue = home team win; Yellow = draw; Red = away team win.

== Positions by round ==
The following table represents the teams position after each round in the competition.

Team ╲ Round	1	2	3	4	5	6	7	8	9	10	11	12	13	14	15	16	17	18	19	20	21	22	23	24	25	26	27	28	29	30	31	32	33	34
Beşiktaş	1	8	3	3	2	1	1	1	1	1	1	1	2	1	1	1	1	1	1	1	1	1	1	1	1	1	1	1	1	1	1	1	1	1
Fenerbahçe	3	5	1	1	1	2	3	3	3	3	2	2	1	2	2	2	2	2	2	2	2	2	2	2	2	2	2	2	2	2	2	2	2	2
Konyaspor	12	12	16	11	12	11	4	4	6	6	7	7	7	7	7	7	7	7	5	6	6	5	3	3	3	3	3	3	3	3	3	3	3	3
İstanbul Başakşehir	14	15	12	17	11	10	13	8	5	5	4	4	5	5	5	4	5	4	4	4	4	6	4	4	4	4	4	4	4	4	4	4	4	4
Osmanlıspor	11	7	9	9	7	3	5	9	12	13	11	12	11	12	12	12	12	14	12	9	9	8	8	8	8	6	6	7	5	5	5	5	5	5
Galatasaray	7	13	10	8	8	4	2	2	2	2	3	3	4	4	4	3	3	3	3	3	5	3	5	5	5	5	5	6	8	6	6	7	6	6
Kasımpaşa	2	1	4	6	5	6	6	5	7	7	6	6	6	6	6	5	4	5	6	7	7	7	7	6	6	8	8	5	7	8	8	8	7	7
Akhisar Belediyespor	9	4	6	5	10	9	9	7	4	4	5	5	3	3	3	6	6	6	7	5	3	4	6	7	7	7	7	8	6	7	7	6	8	8
Antalyaspor	4	2	5	4	6	7	7	6	8	10	9	10	10	10	9	11	11	12	14	13	14	10	13	13	11	13	11	12	12	12	10	10	9	9
Gençlerbirliği	13	17	13	16	15	16	14	14	14	14	14	14	15	15	16	16	16	15	15	15	12	14	12	10	9	11	12	11	9	9	9	9	10	10
Bursaspor	15	16	17	15	17	13	12	13	11	8	8	11	12	13	14	14	14	13	11	11	13	12	10	9	10	9	9	9	10	10	11	12	11	11
Trabzonspor	6	3	2	2	3	8	10	11	9	9	12	9	9	8	10	8	9	10	10	12	8	9	14	14	13	10	10	10	11	11	12	11	12	12
Çaykur Rizespor	5	6	7	7	4	5	8	10	13	12	10	8	8	9	8	10	8	9	9	10	11	13	11	12	14	14	14	14	14	15	13	13	13	13
Gaziantepspor	18	10	14	13	9	12	11	12	10	11	13	13	13	11	11	9	10	8	8	8	10	11	9	11	12	12	13	13	13	14	15	15	15	14
Kayserispor	10	11	8	10	13	15	16	16	15	15	15	15	14	14	13	13	13	11	13	14	15	15	15	15	15	15	15	15	15	13	14	14	14	15
Sivasspor	8	14	15	14	14	14	15	15	16	16	16	16	16	16	15	15	15	16	16	16	16	16	16	17	16	16	17	16	16	17	17	17	16	16
Eskişehirspor	16	9	11	12	16	17	17	18	18	18	18	18	18	18	18	18	18	18	17	18	18	18	18	18	18	18	16	17	17	16	16	16	17	17
Mersin İdman Yurdu	17	18	18	18	18	18	18	17	17	17	17	17	17	17	17	17	17	17	18	17	17	17	17	16	17	17	18	18	18	18	18	18	18	18

Leader / 2016–17 Champions League
2016–17 UEFA Champions League Play-off round
2016–17 UEFA Europa League Play-off round
2016–17 UEFA Europa League Third qualifying round
Relegation to 2016–17 TFF First League

Source: tff.org (in Turkish)

== Results by round ==
The following table represents the teams game results in each round.

Team ╲ Round	1	2	3	4	5	6	7	8	9	10	11	12	13	14	15	16	17	18	19	20	21	22	23	24	25	26	27	28	29	30	31	32	33	34
Akhisar Belediyespor	D	W	D	D	L	W	D	W	W	W	L	W	W	W	L	L	D	L	D	W	W	D	L	L	D	D	D	L	W	D	D	D	L	L
Antalyaspor	W	W	L	W	L	D	D	W	L	L	D	D	D	L	W	L	D	L	L	W	L	W	D	L	W	L	D	D	W	L	W	W	W	L
Beşiktaş	W	L	W	W	D	W	W	W	W	D	W	W	L	W	W	W	W	W	W	W	D	W	L	W	W	W	L	W	W	D	W	W	W	L
Bursaspor	L	L	L	W	L	W	W	L	W	W	L	L	L	L	L	L	W	W	W	D	L	D	W	W	L	W	W	L	L	L	D	D	D	W
Çaykur Rizespor	W	D	D	D	W	D	L	L	L	D	W	W	D	L	W	L	W	L	L	D	L	L	W	L	L	D	D	D	L	L	W	L	W	L
Eskişehirspor	L	W	D	L	L	L	L	L	L	L	L	L	W	L	L	L	W	L	W	D	W	L	L	L	D	D	W	D	L	W	W	D	L	L
Fenerbahçe	W	D	W	W	W	L	D	W	D	W	W	W	W	D	W	W	W	W	W	L	W	D	W	W	W	D	D	L	W	W	W	L	W	D
Galatasaray	D	L	W	D	W	W	W	W	D	W	L	D	D	W	L	W	D	W	L	D	L	W	L	D	D	D	L	D	L	W	D	L	W	W
Gaziantepspor	L	W	L	D	W	L	W	L	W	D	L	L	D	D	W	W	D	W	L	L	L	D	W	D	L	D	L	L	L	L	L	D	L	W
Gençlerbirliği	L	L	W	L	D	L	W	L	W	D	D	L	D	L	L	L	L	W	W	W	W	L	W	W	D	L	L	W	W	W	D	L	L	W
İstanbul Başakşehir	L	L	W	L	W	W	L	W	W	D	W	W	D	W	L	W	L	W	D	D	D	D	W	D	L	D	W	D	W	D	D	W	W	W
Kasımpaşa	W	W	L	L	W	D	D	W	L	D	W	D	D	W	W	W	D	L	D	L	L	W	L	W	L	L	W	W	L	L	D	L	W	W
Kayserispor	D	D	W	L	L	L	L	L	W	D	D	D	W	L	W	D	D	W	L	L	L	D	L	L	L	D	D	D	W	W	L	D	D	L
Konyaspor	D	D	L	W	D	W	W	W	L	D	L	W	D	W	L	W	L	W	W	D	D	W	W	W	W	D	W	W	W	W	L	W	D	W
Mersin İdman Yurdu	L	L	L	D	L	L	D	W	L	D	D	L	L	W	L	L	L	L	D	W	W	L	L	W	L	D	L	L	L	L	L	L	L	L
Osmanlıspor	D	W	D	L	W	W	L	L	L	L	W	L	D	L	W	L	D	L	W	W	D	W	W	D	W	W	D	D	W	W	D	D	L	W
Sivasspor	D	L	D	D	D	D	D	L	L	L	W	L	D	L	W	D	L	L	L	L	W	L	D	L	W	L	L	W	L	D	D	W	D	D
Trabzonspor	W	W	D	W	L	L	L	L	W	D	L	W	L	W	L	W	D	L	L	L	W	L	L	L	W	W	W	D	L	L	L	W	L	L

Updated to match(es) played on 19 May 2016. Source:
W = Win; D = Draw; L = Loss

== Attendances ==
Pos	Team	Total	High	Low	Average	Change
1	Fenerbahçe	486,019	45,070	6,339	28,589	+42.7%
2	Galatasaray	322,929	37,748	5,577	18,996	−20.2%
3	Beşiktaş	317,351	38,421	6,340	18,668	+35.4%
4	Konyaspor	269,799	32,863	4,824	15,871	−16.7%
5	Bursaspor	191,167	24,034	0	11,245	+31.8%^{2}
6	Antalyaspor	159,155	21,735	1,200	9,362	+267.6%^{1}
7	Trabzonspor	130,838	20,384	0	7,696	−19.1%^{2}
8	Eskişehirspor	115,858	11,130	2,183	6,815	+20.9%
9	Mersin İdman Yurdu	86,966	12,388	785	5,116	−29.0%
10	Sivasspor	82,981	10,172	2,650	4,881	−11.7%
11	Kayserispor	72,270	13,060	0	4,251	−13.7%^{1,2}
12	Osmanlıspor	71,165	7,115	3,010	4,186	+12.1%^{1}
13	Çaykur Rizespor	56,337	7,899	2,071	3,314	−1.2%
14	Gaziantepspor	52,104	7,535	690	3,065	−8.5%
15	İstanbul Başakşehir	46,180	6,870	728	2,716	+1.4%
16	Gençlerbirliği	43,607	7,802	1,000	2,565	−21.4%
17	Akhisar Belediyespor	40,692	12,094	650	2,394	−40.6%
18	Kasımpaşa	33,143	4,517	300	1,950	−16.8%
	League total	2,578,561	45,070	0	8,427	+5.1%

Updated to games played on 19 May 2016
Notes:
1: Team played last season in TFF First League
2: Kayserispor - T.Konyaspor, Trabzonspor - Gençlerbirliği, Bursaspor - Kayserispor, Bursaspor - Fenerbahçe, Trabzonspor - Çaykur Rize and Trabzonspor - Kasımpaşa games were played behind closed gates

== Statistics ==
=== Top goalscorers ===
As of 19 May 2016

"Süper Lig Top Goalscorers". TFF.
"Süper Lig Top Goalscorers". NTV Spor.

Pos.	Player	Team	Goals
1	(Germany) Mario Gómez	Beşiktaş	26
2	(Cameroon) Samuel Eto'o	Antalyaspor	20
3	(Colombia) Hugo Rodallega	Akhisar Belediyespor	19
4	(Bosnia and Herzegovina) Edin Višća	İstanbul Başakşehir	17
5	(Netherlands) Robin van Persie	Fenerbahçe	16
6	(Germany) Lukas Podolski	Galatasaray	13
6	(Switzerland) Eren Derdiyok	Kasımpaşa	13
6	(Brazil) Fernandão	Fenerbahçe	13
9	(Morocco) Aatif Chahechouhe	Sivasspor	12
10	6 players		11

=== Hat-tricks ===
As of 19 May 2016

Date	Player	For	Against	Result
16 August 2015	Cenk Tosun	Beşiktaş	Mersin İdman Yurdu	5–2
23 August 2015	Theofanis Gekas	Eskişehirspor	Sivasspor	4–2
18 September 2015	Badou Ndiaye	Osmanlıspor	Mersin İdman Yurdu	4–0
19 September 2015	Deniz Kadah	Çaykur Rizespor	Antalyaspor	5–1
4 October 2015	Tomáš Necid	Bursaspor	Çaykur Rizespor	3–2
23 April 2016	Hugo Rodallega	Akhisar Belediyespor	Beşiktaş	3–3
13 May 2016	Ömer Şişmanoğlu	Antalyaspor	Trabzonspor	7–0
15 May 2016	Óscar Scarione	Kasımpaşa	Mersin İdman Yurdu	7–0
19 May 2016	Sinan Gümüş	Galatasaray	Kayserispor	6–0

=== Clean sheets ===
==== Player ====
As of 19 May 2016

Rank	Player	Club	Match Played	Clean sheets
1	(Turkey) Volkan Demirel	Fenerbahçe	32	17
2	(Turkey) Serkan Kırıntılı	Konyaspor	31	13
3	(Turkey) Volkan Babacan	İstanbul Başakşehir	34	12
4	(Serbia) Milan Lukač	Akhisar Belediyespor	24	11
4	(Turkey) Tolga Zengin	Beşiktaş	30	11

==== Club ====
- Most clean sheets: 17
  - Fenerbahçe

== Awards ==
=== Annual awards ===
Team of the Season
Goalkeeper	(Turkey) Volkan Babacan (Basaksehir)			
Defence	(Turkey) Gökhan Gönül (Fenerbahçe)	(Denmark) Simon Kjær (Fenerbahçe)	(Turkey) Yalçın Ayhan (Basaksehir)	(Turkey) İsmail Köybaşı (Beşiktaş)
Midfield	(Bosnia and Herzegovina) Edin Višća (Başakşehir)	(Canada) Atiba Hutchinson (Beşiktaş)	(Turkey) Oğuzhan Özyakup (Beşiktaş)	(Turkey) Volkan Şen (Fenerbahçe)
Attack	(Germany) Mario Gómez (Beşiktaş)		(Cameroon) Samuel Eto'o (Antalyaspor)	

== See also ==
- 2015–16 Turkish Cup
- 2015–16 TFF First League
- 2015–16 TFF Second League
- 2015–16 TFF Third League
