= Babacan =

Babacan ([babadʒan]) is a surname. Notable people with the surname include:

- Ali Babacan (born 1967), Turkish politician
- Doğan Babacan (1929–2018), Turkish football referee
- Volkan Babacan (born 1988), Turkish football player
