= Can Arat =

Turkish footballer (born 1984)

Can Arat Ճան Առատ
Personal information
- Full name: Can Arat
- Date of birth: January 21, 1984 (age 42)
- Place of birth: Üsküdar, Istanbul, Turkey
- Height: 1.90 m (6 ft 3 in)
- Position: Center back

Senior career*
Years	Team	Apps	(Gls)
2002–2009	Fenerbahçe	20	(0)
2004	→ Karşıyaka (loan)	15	(1)
2004–2005	→ Sivasspor (loan)	29	(1)
2009–2015	İstanbul B.B.	68	(1)
2015–2017	Antalyaspor	21	(0)
2017	Sarıyer	4	(0)

International career
2001	Turkey U17	3	(0)
2002	Turkey U19	1	(0)
2005–2006	Turkey U21	9	(0)
2005	Turkey Olympic	5	(0)
2011	Turkey A2	1	(0)
2006	Turkey	8	(0)
- * Club domestic league appearances and goals as of 29 April 2017

Can Arat (Western Armenian: Ճան Առատ, born 21 January 1984) is a former Turkish international footballer. He is 1.90 m and played as a center back.

== Club career ==
Arat played 74 times for the Fenerbahçe Academy team, scoring two goals. He became a regular in the squad, following Brazilian defender Fábio Luciano's injury at the start of the 2006–07 season, but lost his place to new transfers Uruguayan international Diego Lugano and Brazilian international Edu Dracena four weeks later.

Arat joined İstanbul Büyükşehir Belediyespor in 2009. He played six season for them.

== International career ==
From 2001 to 2006, Arat played for Turkey in U17, U19 and U21 youth teams.

He has been called up to the Turkey national football team for the Euro 2008 qualifying group matches. He made his international debut for senior team on 12 April 2006 against Azerbaijan national football team.

He also played 5 matches for national Olympic team in 2005 Mediterranean Games and won the silver medal.

== Personal life ==
His family are Armenian and member of Armenian Apostolic Church.

== Honours ==
=== Fenerbahçe ===
- Süper Lig: 2006–07
- Turkish Super Cup: 2007
