= Volkan Babacan =

Turkish footballer

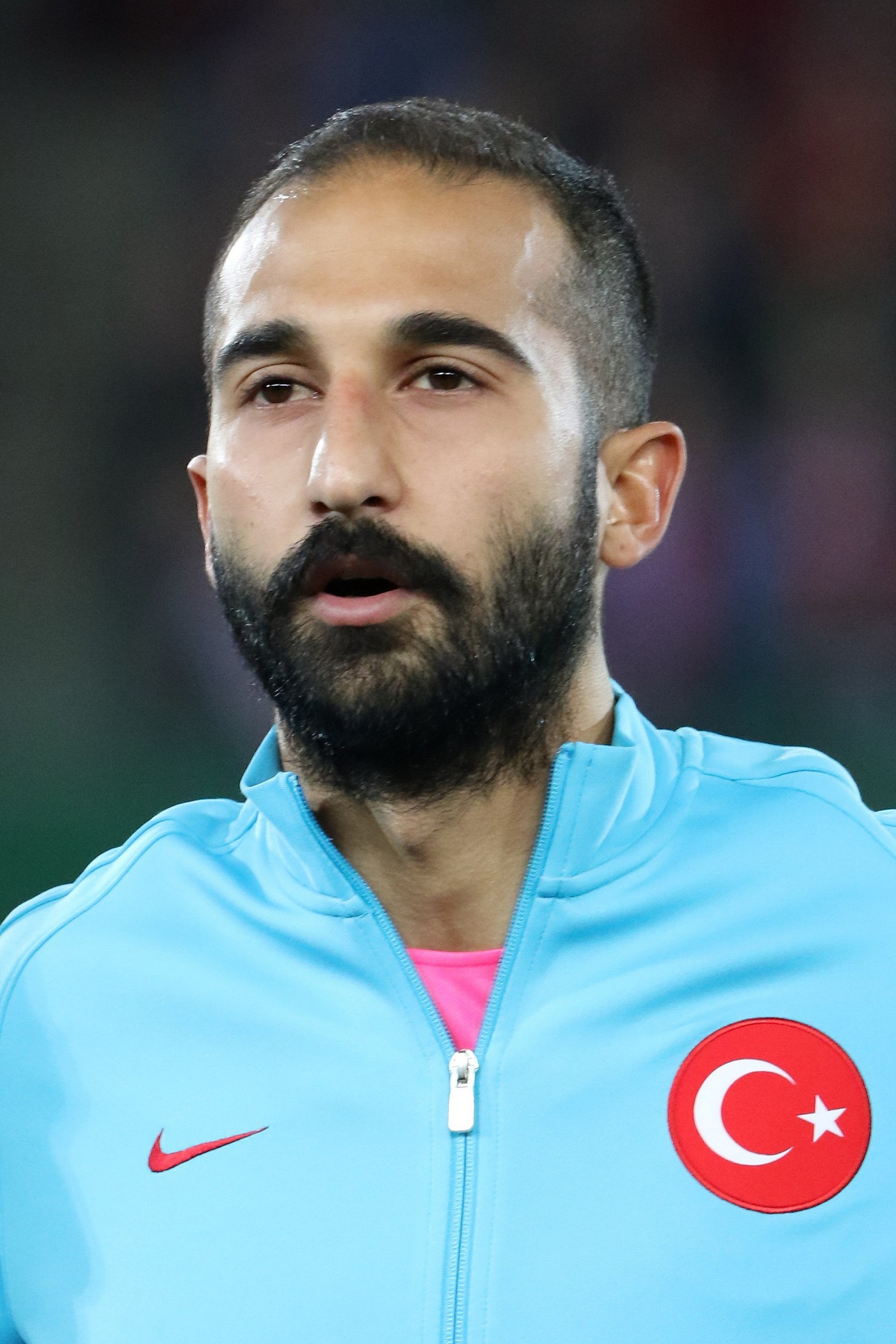
- Babacan with Turkey in 2016

Personal information
- Full name: Volkan Babacan
- Date of birth: 11 August 1988 (age 38)
- Place of birth: Antalya, Turkey
- Height: 1.92 m (6 ft 4 in)
- Position: Goalkeeper

Team information
- Current team: İstanbul Başakşehir
- Number: 1

Youth career
- 2002–2006: Fenerbahçe

Senior career*
Years	Team	Apps	(Gls)
2006–2012	Fenerbahçe	7	(0)
2006–2007	→ İstanbulspor (loan)	11	(0)
2010–2012	→ Kayserispor (loan)	4	(0)
2012–2014	Manisaspor	72	(0)
2014–	İstanbul Başakşehir	231	(0)

International career^{‡}
2003–2004	Turkey U16	21	(0)
2004–2005	Turkey U17	32	(0)
2005–2006	Turkey U18	7	(0)
2006	Turkey U19	5	(0)
2006–2010	Turkey U21	20	(0)
2005	Turkey Olympic	4	(0)
2014–2018	Turkey	35	(0)
Medal record
Representing Turkey
Men's Football
UEFA European Under-17 Championship
Winner	2005 Italy
- * Club domestic league appearances and goals as of 22 June 2024 ‡ National team caps and goals as of 27 March 2018

Volkan Babacan (Turkish: [voɫkan babadʒan]; born 11 August 1988) is a Turkish professional footballer who plays as a goalkeeper for İstanbul Başakşehir.

Babacan was a star at the 2005 FIFA U-17 World Championship, taking Turkey to 3rd place. He made his full international debut on 13 October 2014 in a 1–1 draw away to Latvia in UEFA Euro 2016 qualifying.

== International career ==
Volkan Babacan was used for most of the UEFA Euro 2016 Qualifying matches, replacing Volkan Demirel after a dispute with the fans. Out of the 10 matches Babacan played, he got 4 clean sheets. Turkey ended up getting 3rd place and got ranked the best 3rd place team, automatically sending them to the UEFA Euro 2016 finals in France. He was part of the Turkey national team for Euro 2016.

== Career statistics ==
=== Club ===
As of match played 28 August 2025.

Appearances and goals by club, season and competition
Club	Season	League			Cup		Continental		Other		Total	
Club	Season	Division	Apps	Goals	Apps	Goals	Apps	Goals	Apps	Goals	Apps	Goals
Fenerbahçe	2003–04	Süper Lig	0	0	0	0	—		—		0	0
Fenerbahçe	2007–08	Süper Lig	0	0	2	0	0	0	—		2	0
Fenerbahçe	2008–09	Süper Lig	6	0	9	0	0	0	—		15	0
Fenerbahçe	2009–10	Süper Lig	0	0	2	0	1	0	0	0	3	0
Fenerbahçe	Total		6	0	13	0	1	0	0	0	20	0
İstanbulspor (loan)	2006–07	1. Lig	11	0	2	0	—		—		13	0
Kayserispor (loan)	2010–11	Süper Lig	4	0	0	0	—		—		4	0
Manisaspor	2011–12	Süper Lig	4	0	1	0	—		—		5	0
Manisaspor	2012–13	1. Lig	34	0	0	0	—		3	0	37	0
Manisaspor	2013–14	1. Lig	31	0	0	0	—		—		31	0
Manisaspor	Total		69	0	1	0	—		3	0	73	0
İstanbul Başakşehir	2014–15	Süper Lig	34	0	0	0	—		—		34	0
İstanbul Başakşehir	2015–16	Süper Lig	34	0	2	0	1	0	—		37	0
İstanbul Başakşehir	2016–17	Süper Lig	33	0	4	0	4	0	–		41	0
İstanbul Başakşehir	2017–18	Süper Lig	34	0	0	0	6	0	—		40	0
İstanbul Başakşehir	2018–19	Süper Lig	1	0	4	0	0	0	—		5	0
İstanbul Başakşehir	2019–20	Süper Lig	1	0	4	0	0	0	—		5	0
İstanbul Başakşehir	2020–21	Süper Lig	19	0	3	0	0	0	0	0	22	0
İstanbul Başakşehir	2021–22	Süper Lig	31	0	0	0	—		—		31	0
İstanbul Başakşehir	2022–23	Süper Lig	21	0	2	0	9	0	—		33	0
İstanbul Başakşehir	2023–24	Süper Lig	23	0	0	0	—		—		23	0
İstanbul Başakşehir	2024–25	Süper Lig	0	0	0	0	0	0	—		0	0
İstanbul Başakşehir	2025–26	Süper Lig	0	0	0	0	1	0	—		1	0
İstanbul Başakşehir	Total		231	0	19	0	21	0	0	0	271	0
Career total			321	0	35	0	22	0	3	0	381	0

=== International ===
As of match played 27 March 2018

Appearances and goals by national team and year
National team	Year	Apps	Goals
Turkey
Turkey	2014	3	0
Turkey	2015	9	0
Turkey	2016	13	0
Turkey	2017	8	0
Turkey	2018	2	0
Total		35	0

== Honours ==
Fenerbahce

- Turkish Super Cup: 2007, 2009

İstanbul Başakşehir

- Süper Lig: 2019–20
