= Uğur Arslan Kuru =

Turkish footballer

Uğur Arslan
Personal information
- Full name: Uğur Arslan Kuru
- Date of birth: 16 February 1989 (age 37)
- Place of birth: Düzce, Turkey
- Height: 1.81 m (5 ft 11 in)
- Position: Centre back

Team information
- Current team: Arnavutköy Belediyespor
- Number: 2

Youth career
- 2001–2002: Düzce G.Birliği
- 2002–2003: Düzce Belediye Spor
- 2003–2008: Fenerbahçe

Senior career*
Years	Team	Apps	(Gls)
2008–2011	Fenerbahçe	0	(0)
2008–2009	→ Düzcespor (loan)	25	(1)
2009–2010	→ Balıkesirspor (loan)	36	(2)
2010–2011	→ Altınordu (loan)	14	(1)
2011–2012	Erzurum BB	28	(0)
2012–2015	Aydınspor 1923	94	(4)
2015–2018	Altınordu	71	(2)
2018–2019	Giresunspor	17	(1)
2019	Gazişehir Gaziantep	18	(1)
2019–2020	Akhisarspor	21	(1)
2020–2021	1461 Trabzon	31	(1)
2021–2022	Tarsus İdman Yurdu	19	(3)
2022–	Arnavutköy Belediyespor	5	(0)

International career
2004–2005	Turkey U16	16	(1)
2005–2006	Turkey U17	12	(0)
2006–2007	Turkey U19	9	(0)
2007–2008	Turkey U20	16	(0)
- * Club domestic league appearances and goals as of 5 November 2022

Uğur Arslan Kuru (born 16 February 1989) is a Turkish football player who plays for TFF Second League club Arnavutköy Belediyespor.

== Career ==
He began football in 2001 at Düzce G.Birliği, before joining Düzce Belediye Spor in 2002 as a youth player. One year later, he joined Fenerbahçe on an amateur contract where he played from 2003 to 2007 as youth player. In 2008, he signed his first professional contract with Fenerbahçe.

He played 35 times for National youth teams as U19, U18, U17 and U16 national teams.
