= 2007 Turkish Super Cup =

Fenerbahçe	Beşiktaş
2	1
- Date: 5 August 2007
- Venue: RheinEnergie Stadion, Cologne
- Man of the Match: Deivid de Souza (Fenerbahçe)
- Referee: Fırat Aydınus (Turkey)
- Attendance: 38,000

The 2007 Turkish Super Cup was a football match and the 35th edition of the Turkish Super Cup. It was played between the Turkish Super League Champion, Fenerbahçe S.K., and the Turkish Cup winner, Beşiktaş J.K. Fenerbahçe won 2–1.

== Match details ==
5 August 2007
20:00 CEST

Fenerbahçe	2–1	Beşiktaş
Deivid 14'; Kežman 86'	Report (in Turkish)	Bobô 20'

RheinEnergieStadion, Cologne
Referee: Fırat Aydınus (Turkey)

Fenerbahçe:
GK	22	(Turkey) Serdar Kulbilge
DF	19	(Turkey) Önder Turacı
DF	17	(Turkey) Can Arat
DF	36	(Brazil) Edu	(yellow card) 5'
DF	3	(Brazil) Roberto Carlos	(yellow card) 50'
MF	99	(Brazil) Deivid	(yellow card) 15'
MF	24	(Turkey) Deniz Barış
MF	15	(Turkey) Mehmet Aurélio
MF	25	(Turkey) Uğur Boral		(substituted off) 63'
MF	20	(Brazil) Alex (c)		(substituted off) 78'
FW	9	(Serbia) Mateja Kežman	(yellow card) 87'	(substituted off) 90'
Substitutes:
GK	1	(Turkey) Volkan Demirel
DF	6	(Turkey) Gökçek Vederson
FW	8	(Turkey) Kazım Kazım		(substituted on) 78'
MF	18	(Turkey) Ali Bilgin		(substituted on) 63'
MF	21	(Turkey) Selçuk Şahin		(substituted on) 90'
MF	32	(Turkey) Gürhan Gürsoy
DF	77	(Turkey) Gökhan Gönül
Manager:
(Brazil) Zico

Beşiktaş:
GK	84	(Turkey) Hakan Arıkan
DF	2	(Turkey) Serdar Kurtuluş
DF	58	(Turkey) İbrahim Toraman	(yellow card) 90+2'
DF	78	(Turkey) İbrahim Kaş
DF	19	(Turkey) İbrahim Üzülmez (c)	(red card) 89'
MF	41	(Turkey) Koray Avcı	(yellow card) 66'	(substituted off) 87'
MF	18	(France) Édouard Cissé
MF	6	(Turkey) Mehmet Yozgatlı		(substituted off) 60'
MF	55	(Turkey) İbrahim Akın		(substituted off) 46'
MF	10	(Argentina) Matias Delgado
FW	13	(Brazil) Bobô	(yellow card) 90+2'
Substitutes:
GK	1	(Turkey) Rüştü Reçber
DF	22	(Turkey) Ali Tandoğan
DF	8	(Turkey) Baki Mercimek
MF	21	(Turkey) Serdar Özkan		(substituted on) 60'
MF	14	(Chile) Rodrigo Tello		(substituted on) 46'
FW	26	(Turkey) Can Erdem		(substituted on) 87'
MF	53	(Turkey) Fahri Tatan
Manager:
(Turkey) Ertuğrul Sağlam
