= Edu Dracena =

Brazilian footballer (born 1981)

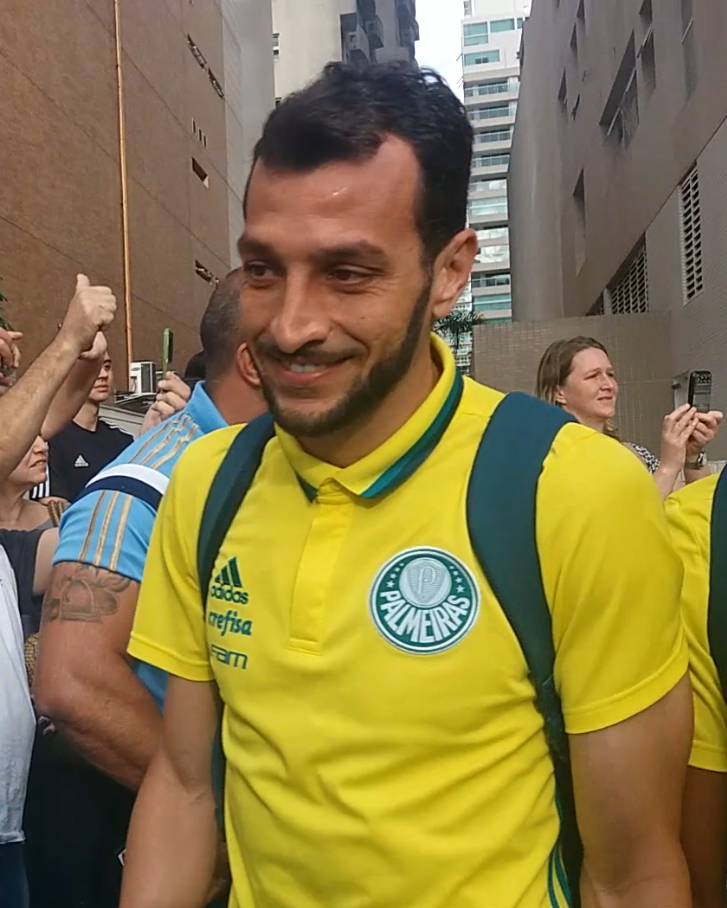
- Dracena with Palmeiras in 2016

Personal information
- Full name: Eduardo Luís Abonízio de Souza
- Date of birth: 18 May 1981 (age 45)
- Place of birth: Dracena, Brazil
- Height: 1.87 m (6 ft 2 in)
- Position: Centre-back

Youth career
- Guarani

Senior career*
Years	Team	Apps	(Gls)
1999–2003	Guarani	90	(3)
2002–2003	→ Olympiacos (loan)	5	(0)
2003–2006	Cruzeiro	131	(9)
2006–2009	Fenerbahçe	72	(5)
2009–2015	Santos	178	(13)
2015	Corinthians	27	(2)
2016–2019	Palmeiras	94	(2)
Total		597	(34)

International career
2004	Brazil U23	8	(0)
2007	Brazil	2	(0)
- * Club domestic league appearances and goals

Eduardo Luís Abonízio de Souza (born 18 May 1981), better known as Edu Dracena, is a Brazilian retired professional footballer who played as a central defender.

== Club career ==
=== Guarani ===
Born in Dracena, São Paulo, Dracena (nickname earned from his birthplace) graduated with Guarani's youth setup. He made his professional debut on 28 February 1999, starting in a 2–1 Campeonato Paulista away loss against Matonense, aged just 17.

Dracena made his Série A debut on 8 August 1999, starting in a 1–0 away win over Gama. He scored his first senior goal in the opening match of the 2000 season, netting the opener in a 1–1 away draw against América-SP.

Dracena established himself in the club's starting XI in the following years, impressing in 2002.

==== Loan to Olympiacos ====
On 2 July 2002, Dracena was loaned to Olympiacos in a season-long deal. He was a part of the squad which won the Alpha Ethniki, but only appearing in five matches.

=== Cruzeiro ===
Shortly after his return to Guarani, Dracena signed for Cruzeiro on 8 February 2003, as a replacement for Lyon-bound Cris. He appeared regularly for the club, winning the year's Série A and Copa do Brasil.

Dracena fell through the pecking order in 2005, mainly due to an injury which ruled him out for seven months. In 2006, he was appointed Cruzeiro's captain, winning the year's Campeonato Mineiro.

=== Fenerbahçe ===
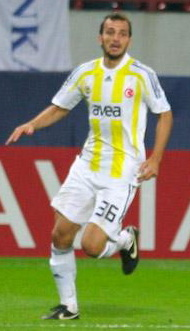
Dracena playing for Fenerbahçe in 2007

In August 2006, Dracena transferred to Fenerbahçe for a €5.7 million fee. On 19 May 2007, he scored Fenerbahçe's 500th goal against rivals Galatasaray.

Dracena rescinded his link with the club on 24 August 2009, after being mainly used as a backup during the 2008–09 season.

=== Santos ===
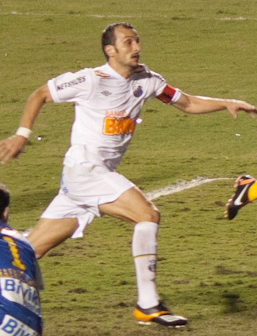
Dracena in action for Santos in the second leg of the 2011 Copa Libertadores finals

On 16 September 2009, Dracena signed a three-year deal with Santos FC, being sidelined during his first year due to a knee injury.

Dracena was an important defensive unit for Peixe in the following years, winning three Paulista titles (2010, 2011 and 2012), one Copa do Brasil (2010, scoring in the final) and one Copa Libertadores (2011). However, he struggled with two serious knee injuries which sidelined him for long periods.

On 15 January 2015, after the club's financial trouble, Dracena rescinded his link.

=== Corinthians ===
On 21 January 2015, Dracena signed a two-year deal with Santos' fierce rivals Corinthians. On 22 December, after being a backup option, he terminated his contract.

=== Palmeiras ===
Shortly after leaving Corinthians, Dracena signed a two-year contract with Palmeiras. He was again a backup for the most of his spell, but still won two Série A titles with the club (2016 and 2018).

On 4 December 2019, Dracena announced his retirement from professional football at the age of 38.

== International career ==
Dracena represented Brazil at the 2001 U-20 World Cup. In June 2003, he received his first call-up to the Brazilian senior team for the 2003 Confederations Cup, but did not play.

Four years later, Dracena was called up to play a friendly match against United States and Mexico on 9 and 12 September 2007. He came off the bench in the second half against the U.S., followed by a place in the starting lineup against Mexico.

== Post-playing career ==
On 19 December 2019, Dracena was presented as the new technical advisor of Palmeiras, replacing former player Zé Roberto. On 27 October 2021, he returned to Santos after being named the club's football executive.

On 7 July 2022, Dracena resigned from his executive role at Santos.

== Career statistics ==
=== Club ===
Appearances and goals by club, season and competition
Club	Season	League			State League		National cup		Continental		Other		Total	
Club	Season	Division	Apps	Goals	Apps	Goals	Apps	Goals	Apps	Goals	Apps	Goals	Apps	Goals
Guarani	1999	Série A	19	0	13 (Note: Appearance(s) in Campeonato Paulista)	0	4	0	—		—		36	0
Guarani	2000	Série A	16	1	11	2	1	0	—		—		28	3
Guarani	2001	Série A	21	0	10	0	2	0	—		—		33	0
Guarani	2002	Série A	0	0	—		3	1	—		14 (Note: Appearance(s) in Torneio Rio – São Paulo)	2	17	3
Guarani	Total		56	1	34	2	10	1	—		14	2	114	6
Olympiacos	2002–03	Alpha Ethniki	5	0	—		—		5 (Note: Appearance(s) in UEFA Champions League)	0	—		10	0
Cruzeiro	2003	Série A	35	3	3 (Note: Appearance(s) in Campeonato Mineiro)	1	9	1	2 (Note: Appearance(s) in Copa Sudamericana)	1	—		49	6
Cruzeiro	2004	Série A	32	2	12	0	—		9 (Note: Appearance(s) in Copa Libertadores)	1	—		53	3
Cruzeiro	2005	Série A	5	0	13	1	3	0	—		—		21	1
Cruzeiro	2006	Série A	17	1	14	1	6	1	—		—		37	3
Cruzeiro	Total		89	6	42	3	18	2	11	2	—		160	13
Fenerbahçe	2006–07	Süper Lig	27	1	—		4	0	8 (Note: Appearance(s) in UEFA Cup)	0	—		39	1
Fenerbahçe	2007–08	Süper Lig	29	3	—		4	0	12	0	1 (Note: Appearance(s) in Turkish Super Cup)	0	46	3
Fenerbahçe	2008–09	Süper Lig	16	1	—		5	1	8	0	—		29	2
Fenerbahçe	Total		72	5	—		13	1	28	0	1	0	114	6
Santos	2009	Série A	2	0	—		—		—		—		2	0
Santos	2010	Série A	28	2	16	0	9	2	2	0	—		55	4
Santos	2011	Série A	27	1	19	1	—		13	1	2 (Note: Appearance(s) in FIFA Club World Cup)	0	61	3
Santos	2012	Série A	6	2	13	4	—		12	1	—		31	7
Santos	2013	Série A	33	2	15	1	5	0	—		—		53	3
Santos	2014	Série A	19	0	0	0	6	0	—		—		25	0
Santos	Total		115	7	63	6	20	2	27	2	2	0	227	17
Corinthians	2015	Série A	16	2	11	0	1	0	4	0	—		32	2
Palmeiras	2016	Série A	17	0	4	0	2	0	2	0	—		25	0
Palmeiras	2017	Série A	25	0	12	0	4	0	6	0	—		47	0
Palmeiras	2018	Série A	20	2	1	0	6	0	5	0	—		32	2
Palmeiras	2019	Série A	6	0	9	0	2	0	0	0	—		17	0
Palmeiras	Total		68	2	26	0	14	0	13	0	—		121	2
Career total			421	23	176	11	76	6	88	4	17	2	778	46

=== International ===
Appearances and goals by national team and year
National team	Year	Apps	Goals
Brazil	2007	2	0
Total		2	0

== Honours ==
Olympiacos

- Alpha Ethniki: 2002–03

Cruzeiro

- Campeonato Brasileiro Série A: 2003
- Copa do Brasil: 2003
- Campeonato Mineiro: 2003, 2004, 2006

Fenerbahçe

- Süper Lig: 2006–07
- Turkish Super Cup: 2007

Santos

- Campeonato Paulista: 2010, 2011, 2012
- Copa do Brasil: 2010
- Copa Libertadores: 2011

Corinthians

- Campeonato Brasileiro Série A: 2015

Palmeiras

- Campeonato Brasileiro Série A: 2016, 2018
