= Marmarabirlik =

Turkish olive production company

- Industry: Food
- Founded: 28 June 1954
- Headquarters: Nilüfer, Bursa, Turkey
- Products: Green and black table olives, olive oil, olive paste
- Brands: Marmarabirlik, MarBir, Unimar
- Operating income: 176,880,515 TL or US$118,000,000 (2010)
- Members: 28,500 olive farmers
- Number of employees: 624
- Website: www.marmarabirlik.com.tr

Marmarabirlik is a Turkish olive production company. It was established on June 28, 1954, as a Union of Agricultural Sales Cooperative (UASC), cultivating, harvesting and marketing of olives with mutual assistance and cooperation of the region's olive farmers. The founder members of Marmarabirlik were respectively Gemlik, Mudanya and Erdek Olive Agriculture Sales Cooperatives. Subsequently, Orhangazi, İznik, Edincik, Mürefte, and Marmara Island Olive Agriculture Sales Cooperatives joined the union. Currently, the operating area has extended from İznik Lake to the South Coast of Marmara Sea and Mürefte; a total of eight member cooperatives have evolved into a union. The general manager of Marmara Birlik is İsmail Acar and the chairman of the board of directors is Hidamet Asa.

It is the largest olive producer in Turkey by its purchasing, processing and sales capacity. The company has an average capacity of 30,000 tons of olive purchasing, processing, and sales each year. Marmarabirlik has 28,500 members, consisting of olive farmers.

The company provides new technologies, inputs, and cash credits to olive farmers. In April 2011, Marmarabirlik signed a protocol with Ziraat Bank to provide agricultural credits for its members.

== Sales and marketing activities ==
A logo of Marmarabirlik's trade brand

Marmarabirlik produces an average of 30,000 tons of fresh olive per year. Marmarabirlik conducts sales and marketing activities of produced its products to whole of Turkey with 58 dealers in 78 provinces, to Germany, Denmark, Switzerland, Russia, Northern Cyprus, Bulgaria and to whole Europe with contracted buyer companies and to Canada, United States and Australia markets.

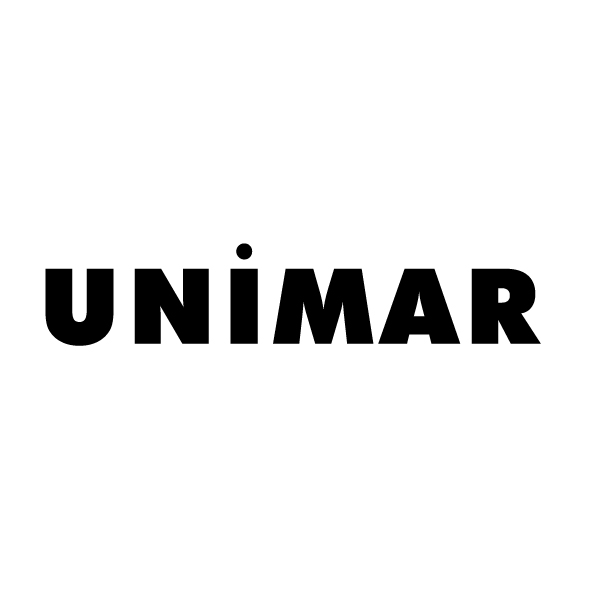
A logo of Marmarabirlik's trade brand

Marmarabirlik sells its table olives in 205 different packagings, which are produced by natural fermentation which means untreated olives are placed directly in brine with slight surface depression and without the addition of a preservative.

The company sells its products under the name of Marmarabirlik, Marbir, and Unimar trade brand. Marmarabirlik sells packaged the entire production and, a total of approximately 225 different packages are used for products of green and black table olives, olive oil, and olive paste.

== History ==
Marmarabirlik was established with joint of Gemlik, Mudanya, and Erdek Olive Agricultural Sales Cooperatives. A year after the establishment of Marmarabirlik, Orhangazi Olive Agriculture Sale Cooperative joined the union. Then, in the 1970s and 1980s, Marmarabirlik received other olive agriculture sale cooperatives as a member of the union in the region, to increase production capacity. These cooperatives respectively joined the union, İznik in 1970, Edincik in 1976, Mürefte in 1986 and finally Marmara in 1988, and now, the numbers of its members are eight cooperatives.

Today, Marmarabirlik has been established on a total area of 403,000 square meters with a building area 136,000 square meters and an olive storage capacity of 70,400 tons. The union also has an olive packing capacity of approximately 150 tons/day and olive oil production and filling capacity of approximately 220 tons/day in Bursa. In total, over 600 workers are to be employed throughout the union to be able to manage and use this capacity.

== Licensed storage ==
In 2004, the development project of Licensed Storage at Unions had been started by initiations of Turkish Ministry of Industry and Commerce and joints of The World Bank, and so, 5300 numbered legal provisions Licensed Storage of Agricultural Products enacted in 2005. Thus, unions aimed to be an integrated system of licensed storage, which has an important place in the storage of agricultural products and trade.

The total cost of the project was proposed between 70 and 80 million dollars, and approximately 35 million dollars were provided in the scope of ARIP loan agreement by The World Bank.

=== Licensed storage activities of Marmarabirlik ===
Today, at this point, the project is successfully implemented only by Marmarabirlik in Turkey. In the scope of the project, Marmarabirlik had invested a total of 17,050,000 $ and the amount of 50% of the investment (8,525,000 $) was refunded from The World Bank's sources within the framework of the Protocol.

This project was started at the end of 2007 and completed at the end of 2008. During this period, the construction of Başköy Licensed Olive Storage with a capacity of 7,000 tons, the construction of Erdek Licensed Olive Storage with a capacity of 8,000 tons and the construction of Başköy Licensed Olive Oil Storage with a capacity of 5,800 litres were completed by the union. In this project, glass reinforced plastic (GRP) tanks, due to being more healthy and hygienic, are used for preservation and natural fermentation of olives instead of concrete tanks and stainless-steel tanks used for olive oil storage as well.

If the necessary commercial and administrative infrastructure is completed before the olive harvest period of 2012, a joint share licensed olive and olive oil storage company has 23,000,000 TL (15,000,000) capital sum, and will start to serve Turkish olive farmers and traders.
