= Mutlu Topçu =

Turkish footballer and coach

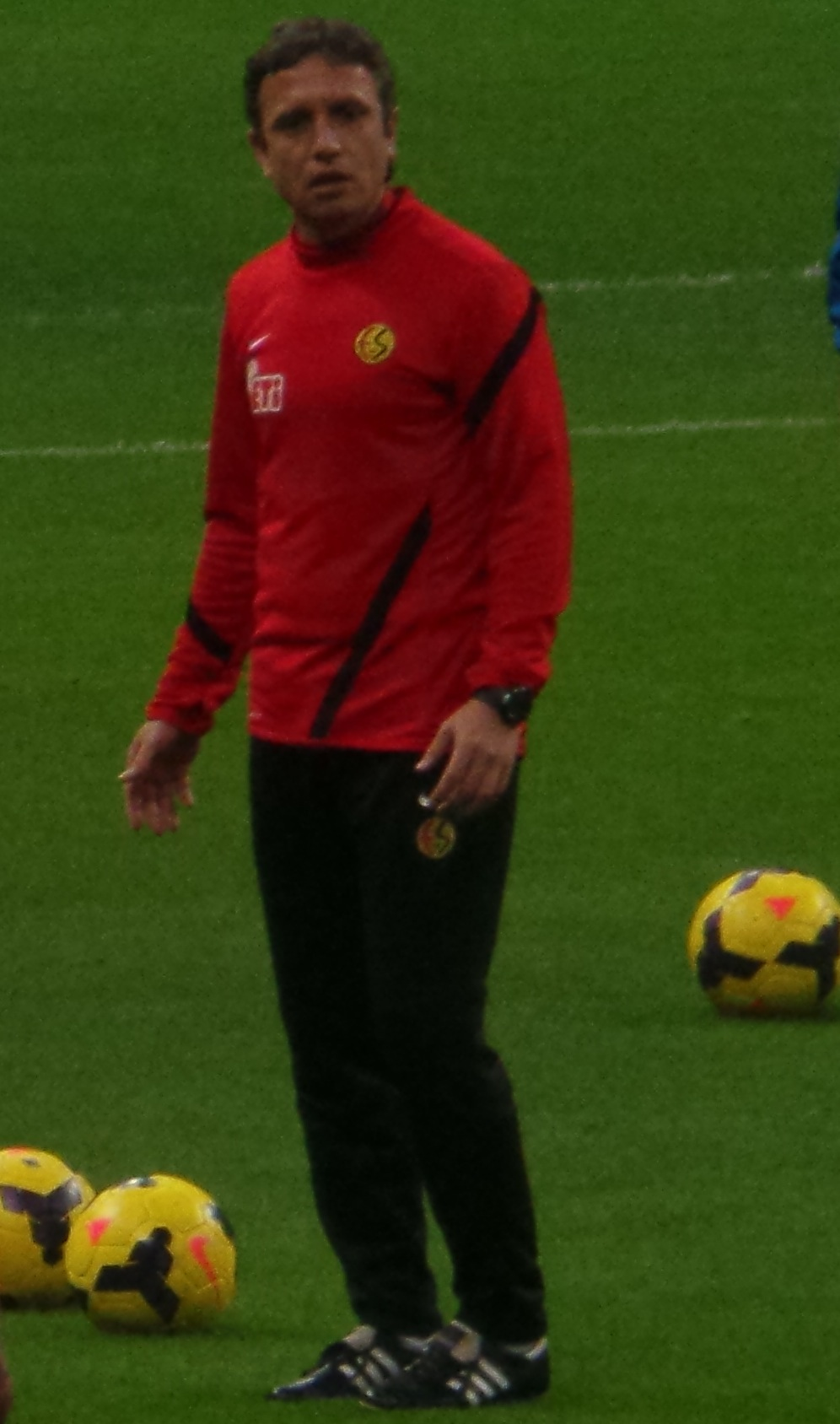
- Topçu with Eskişehirspor in 2014

Personal information
- Full name: Mutlu Topçu
- Date of birth: 16 November 1970 (age 55)
- Place of birth: Bursa, Turkey
- Height: 1.79 m (5 ft 10 in)
- Positions: Left back; left winger

Senior career*
Years	Team	Apps	(Gls)
1990–2000	Beşiktaş	157	(1)
2000–2001	Adanaspor	16	(0)

International career
1994–1995	Turkey	9	(0)

Managerial career
- 2003–2005: Samsunspor (assistant)
- 2005–2007: Kayserispor (assistant)
- 2007–2008: Beşiktaş (assistant)
- 2009–2013: Bursaspor (assistant)
- 2013–2014: Eskişehirspor (assistant)
- 2014: Kayserispor
- 2015–2016: Gaziantepspor
- 2017: Bursaspor
- * Club domestic league appearances and goals

Mutlu Topçu (born 16 November 1970 in Bursa) is a Turkish football coach and a former player.

He played his first game for Turkey against Iceland on 12 October 1994.
