= Volkan Demirel =

Turkish footballer

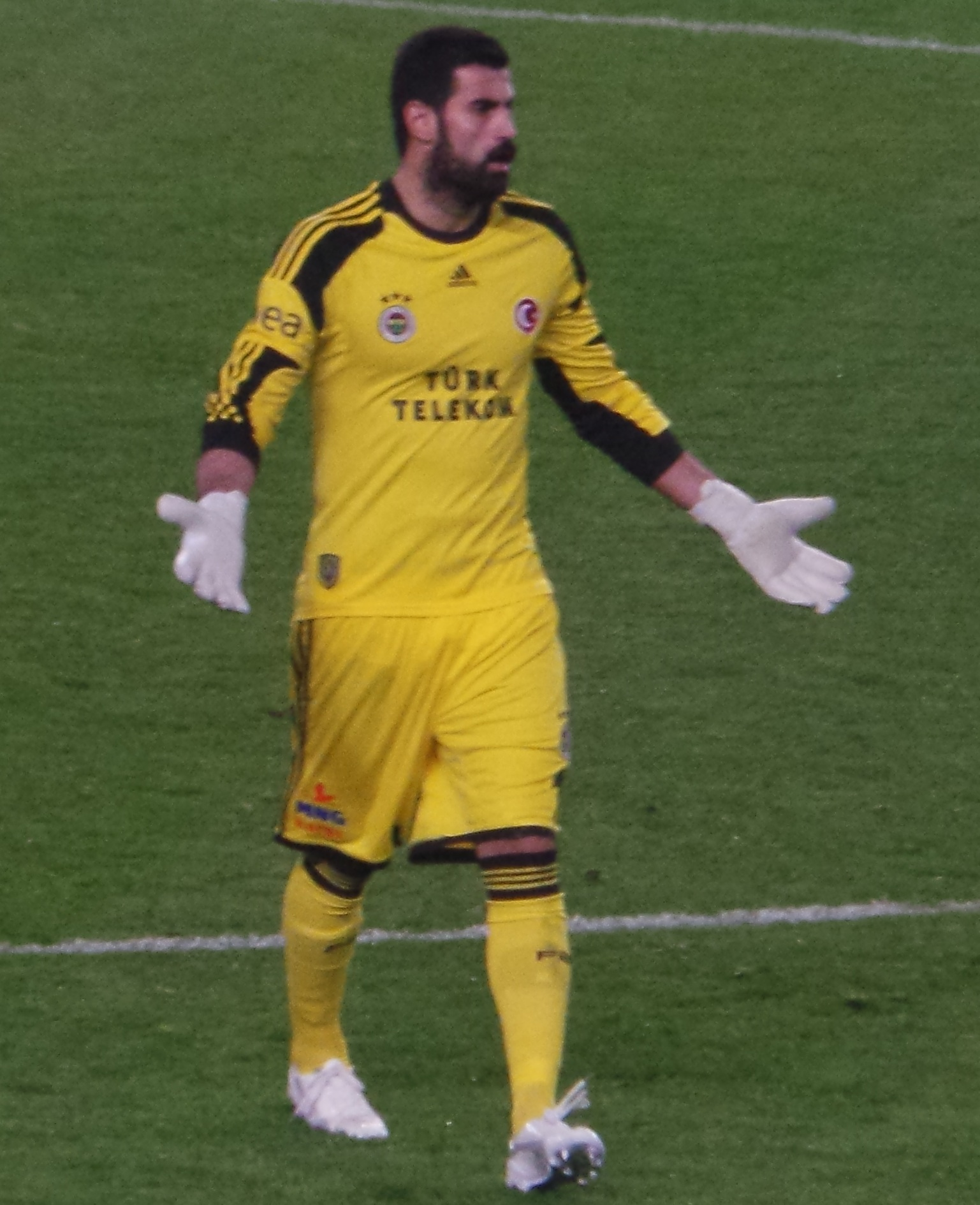
- Demirel with Fenerbahçe in 2014

Personal information
- Full name: Volkan Demirel
- Date of birth: 27 October 1981 (age 45)
- Place of birth: Istanbul, Turkey
- Height: 1.91 m (6 ft 3 in)
- Position: Goalkeeper

Team information
- Current team: Gaziantep (head coach)

Youth career
- 1999–2000: Kartalspor

Senior career*
Years	Team	Apps	(Gls)
2000–2002	Kartalspor	51	(0)
2002–2019	Fenerbahçe	396	(0)
Total		447	(0)

International career
2001	Turkey U20	5	(0)
2001–2003	Turkey U21	17	(0)
2004–2014	Turkey	63	(0)

Managerial career
- 2019–2021: Fenerbahçe (assistant)
- 2021–2022: Fatih Karagümrük
- 2022–2024: Hatayspor
- 2024–2025: Bodrum
- 2025: Gençlerbirliği
- 2026: Gençlerbirliği
- 2026–: Gaziantep
- * Club domestic league appearances and goals

Volkan Demirel (Turkish: [ꞵoɫˈkan deˈmiɾæl]; born 27 October 1981) is a Turkish football coach, pundit and former international goalkeeper who is head coach at Süper Lig club Gaziantep.

For many years, he was the starting goalkeeper of Fenerbahçe and the Turkey national team.

== Club career ==
Demirel was born in Fatih, Istanbul to a family from Artvin with Georgian and Laz roots. He joined Kartalspor as an 18-year-old in 1999 and became the starting goalkeeper the following year. Demirel played in 51 matches over the next two seasons, earning a transfer to Fenerbahçe at the start of the 2002 season.

Originally backing up Rüştü Reçber and Recep Biler, Demirel made his debut for the club on 26 April 2003. After Reçber's transfer to Barcelona, Demirel competed in 19 league matches, splitting time with Biler (who played in 14 matches). He also featured in three Turkish Cup matches and won the 2003–04 Süper Lig title with Fenerbahçe.

Following season, Demirel won another Süper Lig title, but was relegated to the bench after Rüştü Reçber returned to the club at the start of the season. Demirel was the starting goalkeeper at the start of the 2005–06 season, but was benched halfway through the season. At the start of the 2006–07, Demirel was the first choice keeper, but was supplanted by Reçber for a second time. After Reçber suffered an injury, Serdar Kulbilge took over as starting goalkeeper in favor of Demirel for the rest of the season. Demirel played in 25 league matches the following season, with Kulbilge playing the rest. Demirel was the starting goalkeeper for the Fenerbahçe squad that progressed past the group stages of the 2007–08 UEFA Champions League. In the Round of 16 tie with Sevilla, Demirel made several mistakes, costing two goals. However, he went on to save three penalties in the penalty shootout, helping the club progress to the quarter-finals, the first time in club history. Fenerbahçe went on to face Chelsea, losing 2–3 on aggregate. Following Kulbilge's transfer to Kocaelispor, Demirel took over as starting goalkeeper. Demirel signed a four-year contract extension at the end of the 2008–09 season.

== International career ==
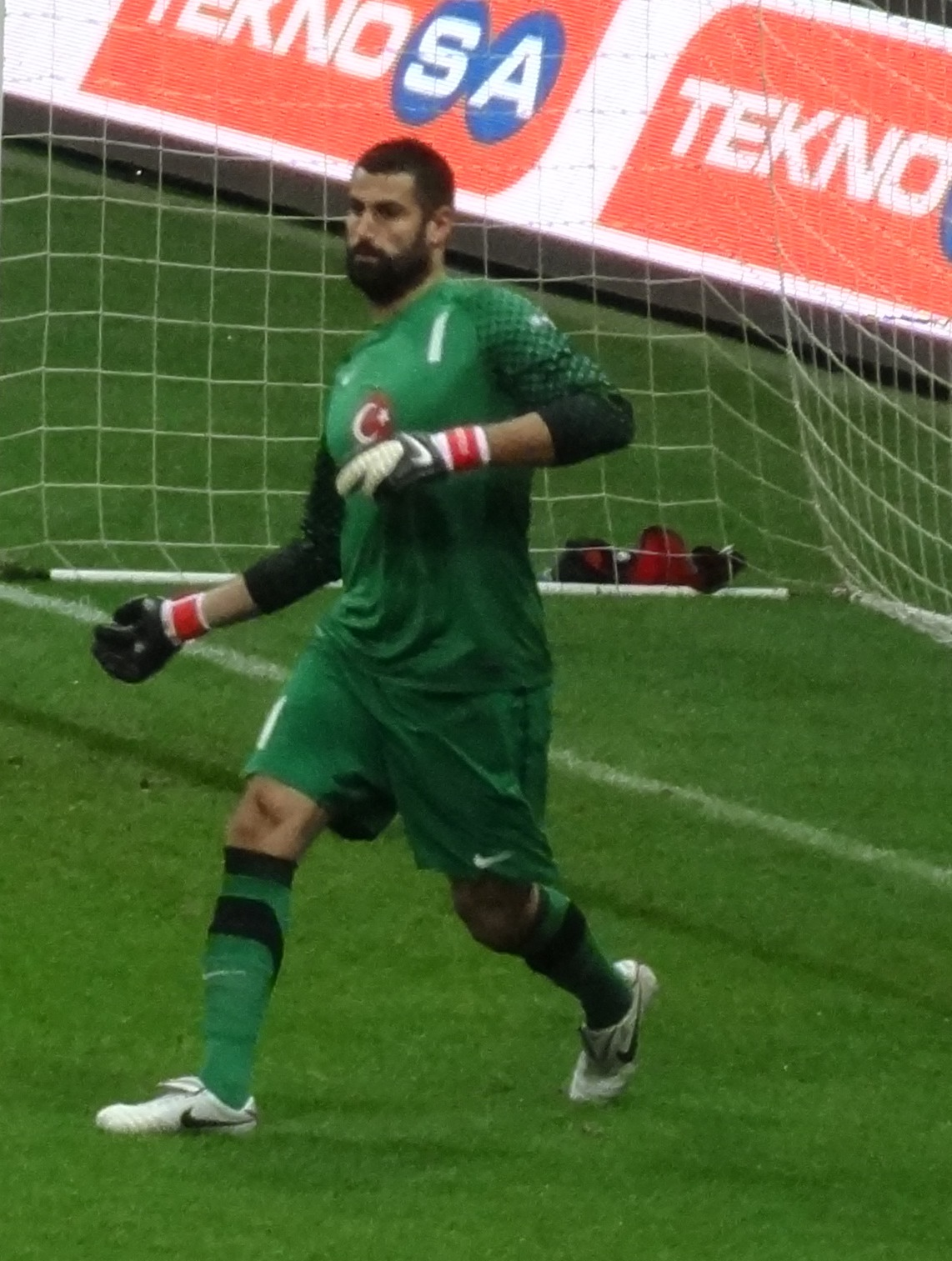
Demirel, playing for Turkey in 2011

Demirel was called up to the Turkey U-20 squad in 2001, being capped four times. He was capped by the Turkey U21 national team 21 times between 2001 and 2003, and earned his first call up to the Turkey national team in 2004. He made his debut for the national team on 28 April 2004 in a friendly against Belgium. Demirel came on as a substitute in the second half.

Demirel was the starting goalkeeper for the Turkey national team at the UEFA Euro 2008 championships, reaching the semi-finals for the first time in team history. He started all three group stages matches, but was suspended for two matches after receiving a red card against the Czech Republic for viciously pushing Jan Koller to the ground after Jan for unknown reasons ran and shouted at him.

In 2014, just before the UEFA Euro 2016 qualifying match against Kazakhstan, Volkan Demirel left the Turkey national team after a dispute with a fan. After Demirel's refusal to play with the national team, Volkan Babacan took over as the starter for the UEFA Euro 2016 Qualifiers.

== Managerial career ==
On 2 September 2019, Fenerbahçe announced that Demirel was retired and would continue his career as an assistant coach in the team. He worked under Ersun Yanal, Tahir Karapınar, Erol Bulut and Emre Belözoğlu respectively.

On 14 July 2021, it was announced that he ended his assistant coaching career at Fenerbahçe in a press conference he held with Fenerbahçe president Ali Koç.

=== Fatih Karagümrük ===
On 17 December 2021, Demirel signed a two-and-a-half-year deal with Fatih Karagümrük

His first match as manager was a 1–0 away win over Göztepe on 19 December.

=== Hatayspor ===
On 21 September 2022, Demirel signed with Hatayspor for one season with an option to extend.

=== Bodrum ===
On 30 October 2024, Bodrum appointed Demirel as the new head coach, following the departure of İsmet Taşdemir. On 3 February 2025, Bodrum parted ways with Demirel by mutual agreement.

== Personal life ==
Volkan Demirel is married to former Miss Belgium Zeynep Sever. They have two daughters named Yade (born in February 2014) and Yeda (born in September 2017).

Throughout his career, Demirel has often been associated with the nickname "Ayı Volkan" ("Volkan the Bear"). The nickname "bear", which is also used in Turkish slang as a derogatory term, was given due to his imposing physique and his passionate and forceful demeanor, which sometimes led to him receiving a red card on the field. Demirel himself has stated in various interviews that he is not bothered by this nickname and even takes it in good humour. On one occasion, he mentioned that his daughter's teddy bear was nicknamed "Volkan".

== Career statistics ==
=== Club ===
Appearances and goals by club, season and competition
Club	Season	League			Turkish Cup		Europe		Other		Total	
Club	Season	Division	Apps	Goals	Apps	Goals	Apps	Goals	Apps	Goals	Apps	Goals
Kartalspor	2000–01	TFF First League	22	0	—		—		—		22	0
Kartalspor	2001–02	TFF First League	29	0	—		—		—		29	0
Kartalspor	Total		51	0	—		—		—		51	0
Fenerbahçe	2002–03	Süper Lig	1	0	—		—		—		1	0
Fenerbahçe	2003–04	Süper Lig	19	0	3	0	—		—		22	0
Fenerbahçe	2004–05	Süper Lig	6	0	1	0	1 (Note: Appearance(s) in UEFA Champions League)	0	—		8	0
Fenerbahçe	2005–06	Süper Lig	18	0	7	0	6	0	—		31	0
Fenerbahçe	2006–07	Süper Lig	16	0	2	0	5 (Note: Appearances in UEFA Cup)	0	—		23	0
Fenerbahçe	2007–08	Süper Lig	25	0	4	0	12	0	0	0	41	0
Fenerbahçe	2008–09	Süper Lig	29	0	0	0	10	0	—		39	0
Fenerbahçe	2009–10	Süper Lig	32	0	6	0	12 (Note: Appearances in UEFA Europa League)	0	1 (Note: Appearance in Turkish Super Cup)	0	51	0
Fenerbahçe	2010–11	Süper Lig	32	0	0	0	2	0	—		34	0
Fenerbahçe	2011–12	Süper Lig	38	0	1	0	—		—		39	0
Fenerbahçe	2012–13	Süper Lig	28	0	2	0	15 (Note: Two appearances in UEFA Champions League, thirteen appearances in UEFA Europa League)	0	1	0	46	0
Fenerbahçe	2013–14	Süper Lig	29	0	0	0	4	0	—		33	0
Fenerbahçe	2014–15	Süper Lig	26	0	2	0	—		1	0	29	0
Fenerbahçe	2015–16	Süper Lig	32	0	1	0	7 (Note: Two appearances in UEFA Champions League, four appearances in UEFA Europa League)	0	—		40	0
Fenerbahçe	2016–17	Süper Lig	28	0	4	0	10	0	—		42	0
Fenerbahçe	2017–18	Süper Lig	25	0	3	0	2	0	—		30	0
Fenerbahçe	2018–19	Süper Lig	12	0	2	0	2	0	—		16	0
Fenerbahçe	Total		396	0	36	0	88	0	3	0	523	0
Career total			447	0	36	0	88	0	3	0	574	0

=== International ===
As of 12 November 2014

Appearances and goals by national team and year
National team	Year	Apps	Goals
Turkey	2004	3	0
Turkey	2005	6	0
Turkey	2006	3	0
Turkey	2007	6	0
Turkey	2008	12	0
Turkey	2009	10	0
Turkey	2010	7	0
Turkey	2011	7	0
Turkey	2012	3	0
Turkey	2013	5	0
Turkey	2014	1	0
Total		63	0

=== Managerial ===
As of 26 January 2024

Managerial record by team and tenure
Team	Nat	From	To	Record							
Team	Nat	From	To	G	W	D	L	GF	GA	GD	Win %
Fatih Karagümrük	(Turkey)	17 December 2021	27 May 2022	24	12	5	7	33	27	+6	50.00
Hatayspor	(Turkey)	21 September 2022	3 May 2024	55	16	16	23	67	87	−20	29.09
Bodrum	(Turkey)	1 November 2024	3 February 2025	12	2	4	6	16	18	−2	16.67
Total				91	30	25	36	116	133	−17	32.97

== Honours ==
Fenerbahçe

- Süper Lig: 2003–04, 2004–05, 2006–07, 2010–11, 2013–14
- Turkish Cup: 2011–12, 2012–13
- Turkish Super Cup: 2007, 2009, 2014

Turkey

- UEFA European Championship bronze medalist: 2008
