= Serdar Kulbilge =

Turkish former footballer (born 1980)

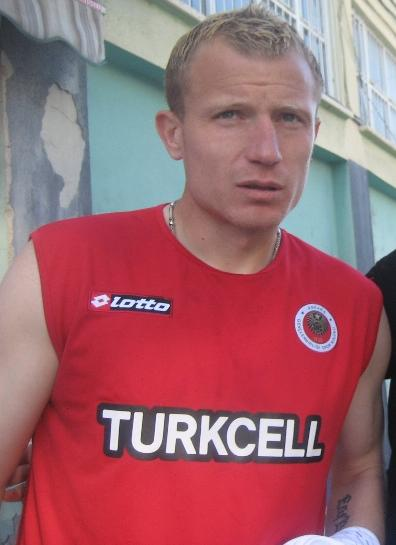

Personal information
- Date of birth: July 7, 1980 (age 46)
- Place of birth: Hayrabolu, Turkey
- Height: 1.86 m (6 ft 1 in)
- Position: Goalkeeper

Senior career*
| Years | Team | Apps | (Gls) |
| 1999–2005 | Bursaspor | 83 | (0) |
| 2005–2008 | Fenerbahçe | 22 | (0) |
| 2008–2009 | Kocaelispor | 18 | (0) |
| 2009–2011 | Gençlerbirliği | 56 | (0) |
| 2011 | Ankaragücü | 0 | (0) |
| 2012–2013 | Boluspor | 24 | (0) |
| 2013–2014 | Gaziantepspor | 10 | (0) |
| 2014–2015 | Adana Demirspor | 13 | (0) |
| 2015 | Kayserispor | 6 | (0) |
| 2015–2017 | Elazığspor | 42 | (0) |
| 2017–2018 | Sarıyer | 21 | (0) |

International career
| 1998–1999 | Turkey U21 | 12 | (0) |
| 2007 | Turkey | 1 | (0) |
- * Club domestic league appearances and goals

Serdar Kulbilge (born 7 July 1980) is a Turkish former footballer who played as a goalkeeper.

== Career ==
Fenerbahçe transferred him from Bursaspor at the start of 2005–06 season. He played only at the Turkish Cup matches last season but after Rüştü Reçber's injury and Volkan Demirel's poor performance, suddenly he became the first option of the first eleven.

Turkey national team coach Fatih Terim called him up for Romania and Malta matches. He received his first senior international cap in a friendly against Romania on 22 August 2007.

On 14 July 2011 he was detained due to allegations of match-fixing in Gençlerbirliği-Fenerbahçe.

== Honours ==
Fenerbahçe

- Süper Lig (1): 2006–07
- Süper Kupa (1): 2006–07
