= 2021–22 Antalyaspor season =

Antalyaspor
2021–22 season
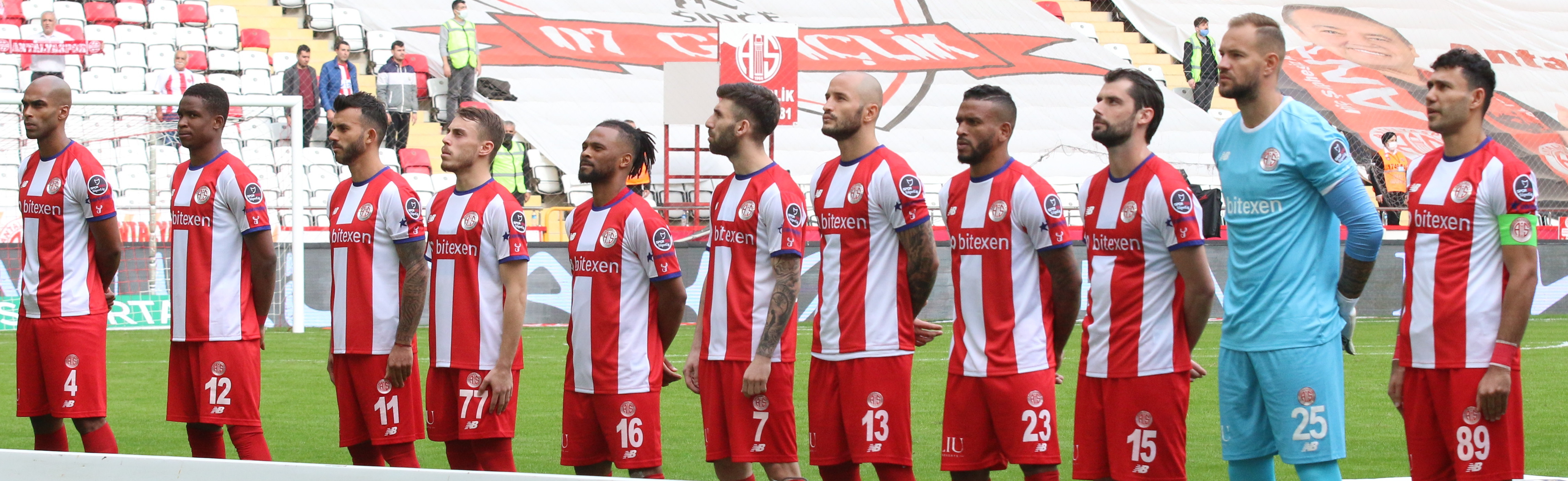
- Antalyaspor at the ceremony before the Alanyaspor match.
- President: Aziz Çetin
- Head coach: Ersun Yanal (until 4 October 2021); Nuri Şahin (from 5 October 2021)
- Stadium: Antalya Stadium
- Süper Lig: 7th
- Turkish Cup: Quarter-finals
- Turkish Super Cup: Runners-up
- Top goalscorer: League: Haji Wright (14); All: Haji Wright (15)
- Highest home attendance: 19,003 (vs. Galatasaray, 20 May 2022, Süper Lig)
- Lowest home attendance: 1,146 (vs. Göztepe, 15 August 2021, Süper Lig)
- Average home league attendance: 6,323
- Biggest win: 5–0 (vs. Diyarbekirspor (H), 28 October 2021, Turkish Cup)
- Biggest defeat: 0–4 (vs. Göztepe (A), 9 January 2022, Süper Lig)
Home colours	Away colours	Third colours

The 2021–22 season was the 56th season in the existence of Antalyaspor and the club's 26th consecutive season in the top flight of Turkish football. In addition to the domestic league, Antalyaspor participated in this season's editions of the Turkish Cup and the Turkish Super Cup.

== Kits ==
Antalyaspor's 2021–22 kits, manufactured by New Balance, released on 8 August 2021 and were up for sale on the same day.

Supplier: New Balance / Main sponsor: Bitexen / Sleeve sponsor: Corendon Airlines / Back sponsor: Anex Tour / Short sponsor: Liu Resorts / Socks sponsor: Bitexen

Home	Away	Third

== Players ==
=== First-team squad ===
As of 8 February 2022

Note: Flags indicate national team as defined under FIFA eligibility rules; some limited exceptions apply. Players may hold more than one non-FIFA nationality.

No.	Pos.	Nation	Player
1	GK	TUR	Doğukan Özkan
2	DF	NED	Sherel Floranus
3	DF	TUR	Berat Onur Pınar
4	DF	BRA	Naldo
5	DF	TUR	Bahadır Öztürk
7	MF	TUR	Doğukan Sinik
8	MF	TUR	Nuri Sahin
9	FW	USA	Haji Wright (on loan from SønderjyskE)
10	MF	BIH	Deni Milošević
11	FW	TUR	Güray Vural
13	DF	RUS	Fyodor Kudryashov
14	FW	SUI	Admir Mehmedi
15	MF	ITA	Andrea Poli
16	MF	ANG	Fredy
19	MF	GER	Ufuk Akyol

No.	Pos.	Nation	Player
20	MF	BRA	Fernando
22	MF	TUR	Harun Alpsoy
25	GK	BEL	Ruud Boffin
27	FW	ALG	Houssam Ghacha
28	FW	SEN	Alassane Ndao (on loan from Al Ahli)
35	GK	TUR	Melih Enes Uygun
38	MF	TUR	Mustafa Erdilman
41	FW	TUR	Gökdeniz Bayrakdar
53	FW	GER	Sinan Gümüş
70	FW	BRA	Luiz Adriano
74	DF	TUR	Doğukan Nelik
77	DF	TUR	Bünyamin Balcı
88	MF	TUR	Hakan Özmert (captain)
89	DF	TUR	Veysel Sarı
99	GK	POR	Diogo Sousa

== Transfers ==
=== In ===
Date	Position	Nationality	Player	From	Fee
4 June 2021	MF	(Turkey)	Harun Alpsoy	(Turkey) Altay	End of loan
4 June 2021	FW	(Nigeria)	Paul Mukairu	(Belgium) Anderlecht	End of loan
4 June 2021	DF	(Turkey)	Berkay Arslan	(Turkey) Antalya Kemerspor	End of loan
4 June 2021	MF	(Turkey)	Mert Çölgeçen	(Turkey) Antalya Kemerspor	End of loan
4 June 2021	MF	(Turkey)	Adem Metin Türk	(Turkey) Bodrumspor	End of loan
4 June 2021	GK	(Turkey)	Yakup Mert Çakır	(Turkey) Bodrumspor	End of loan
4 June 2021	MF	(Turkey)	Harun Kavaklıdere	(Turkey) Bodrumspor	End of loan
4 June 2021	FW	(Turkey)	Cenk Şen	(Turkey) Bodrumspor	End of loan
4 June 2021	MF	(Turkey)	Sergen Yatağan	(Turkey) Bodrumspor	End of loan
4 June 2021	GK	(Turkey)	Melih Enes Uygun	(Turkey) Bodrumspor	Loan
4 June 2021	DF	(Turkey)	Doğukan Nelik	(Turkey) Akhisarspor	End of loan
4 June 2021	FW	(Argentina)	Gustavo Blanco Leschuk	(Spain) Oviedo	End of loan
10 June 2021	MF	(Turkey)	Erkan Eyibil	(Germany) Mainz 05	Undisclosed
3 July 2021	MF	(Germany)	Ersin Zehir	(Germany) FC St. Pauli	Free
3 July 2021	DF	(Netherlands)	Sherel Floranus	(Netherlands) Heerenveen	Free
3 July 2021	GK	(Portugal)	Diogo Sousa	(Portugal) Sporting CP	Undisclosed
5 July 2021	FW	(Turkey)	Güray Vural	(Turkey) Gaziantep	Free
13 July 2021	MF	(Bosnia and Herzegovina)	Deni Milošević	(Turkey) Konyaspor	Undisclosed
17 July 2021	MF	(Algeria)	Houssam Ghacha	(Algeria) ES Sétif	Free
23 July 2021	FW	(United States)	Haji Wright	(Denmark) SønderjyskE	Loan
23 July 2021	MF	(Italy)	Andrea Poli	(Italy) Bologna	Undisclosed
7 September 2021	FW	(France)	Enzo Crivelli	(Turkey) İstanbul Başakşehir	Loan
8 September 2021	DF	(Turkey)	Berat Pınar	(Turkey) Akhisarspor	€0.12M
15 January 2022	FW	(Switzerland)	Admir Mehmedi	(Germany) VfL Wolfsburg	Undisclosed
17 January 2022	MF	(Brazil)	Fernando	(China) Beijing Guoan	Undisclosed
28 January 2022	FW	(Senegal)	Alassane Ndao	(Saudi Arabia) Al Ahli	Loan
4 February 2022	FW	(Brazil)	Luiz Adriano	(Brazil) Palmeiras	Undisclosed
8 February 2022	FW	(Germany)	Sinan Gümüş	(Turkey) Fenerbahçe	Free

=== Out ===
Date	Position	Nationality	Player	To	Fee
3 June 2021	DF	(Turkey)	Ersan Gülüm		End of contract
3 June 2021	FW	(Ivory Coast)	Jean-Armel Drolé	(Cyprus) Doxa Katokopias	End of contract
3 June 2021	FW	(Germany)	Lukas Podolski	(Poland) Górnik Zabrze	End of contract
3 June 2021	FW	(Germany)	Sidney Sam		End of contract
3 June 2021	FW	(Turkey)	Serdar Gürler	(Turkey) Konyaspor	€0.48M
4 June 2021	GK	(Turkey)	Ferhat Kaplan	(Turkey) Adana Demirspor	Mutual agreement
4 June 2021	FW	(Jamaica)	Dever Orgill	(Turkey) Manisa	Mutual agreement
4 June 2021	MF	(Turkey)	Adem Metin Türk	(Turkey) Bodrumspor	End of contract
4 June 2021	MF	(Turkey)	Harun Kavaklıdere	(Turkey) Bodrumspor	End of contract
4 June 2021	FW	(Turkey)	Cenk Şen	(Turkey) Bodrumspor	End of contract
4 June 2021	DF	(Turkey)	Ali Eren İyican	(Turkey) Bodrumspor	Mutual agreement
4 June 2021	FW	(Albania)	Omar Imeri	(Turkey) Bodrumspor	Mutual agreement
4 June 2021	MF	(Turkey)	Sergen Yatağan	(Turkey) Bodrumspor	End of contract
4 June 2021	MF	(Turkey)	Mert Çölgeçen	(Turkey) Arnavutköy Belediyespor	Loan
4 June 2021	GK	(Turkey)	Yakup Mert Çakır	(Turkey) Bayrampaşa	End of contract
4 June 2021	FW	(Argentina)	Gustavo Blanco Leschuk	(Spain) Eibar	Loan
4 June 2021	DF	(Turkey)	Berkay Arslan	(Turkey) Alanya Kestelspor	End of contract
4 June 2021	DF	(Turkey)	Mert Yılmaz	(Turkey) Bursaspor	Loan
15 January 2022	MF	(Brazil)	Amilton	(Turkey) Konyaspor	Mutual agreement
15 January 2022	MF	(Germany)	Ersin Zehir	(Netherlands) Dordrecht	Transfer
27 January 2022	DF	(Turkey)	Eren Albayrak	(Turkey) Çaykur Rizespor	Mutual agreement
27 January 2022	FW	(Nigeria)	Paul Mukairu	(Denmark) Copenhagen	€1.90M
30 January 2022	FW	(France)	Enzo Crivelli	(France) Saint-Étienne	Mutual agreement
31 January 2022	MF	(Turkey)	Erkan Eyibil	(Germany) VfB Stuttgart	Loan

== Pre-season and friendlies ==
Win Draw Loss Fixtures

=== Pre-season ===
15 July 2021 Friendly	Antalyaspor (Turkey)	0–1	(Turkey) Kocaelispor	Erzurum, Turkey
16:00 TRT (UTC+3)			Köse 57'	Stadium: Erzurum High Altitude Training Center 1

18 July 2021 Friendly	BB Erzurumspor (Turkey)	1–2	(Turkey) Antalyaspor	Erzurum, Turkey
16:30 TRT (UTC+3)	N'Diaye 82'		Naldo 5'; Bayrakdar 90'	Stadium: Kazım Karabekir Stadium

23 July 2021 Friendly	Antalyaspor (Turkey)	2–0	(Lebanon) Tadamon Sour	Afyonkarahisar, Turkey
19:00 TRT (UTC+3)	Wright 32'; Sinik 53' (pen.)			Stadium: Zafer Stadium

25 July 2021 Friendly	Antalyaspor (Turkey)	4–1	(Turkey) Menemenspor	Afyonkarahisar, Turkey
19:00 TRT (UTC+3)	Fredy 5'; Wright 18'; Naldo 27'; Mukairu 70'		Sagat 86'	Stadium: Zafer Stadium

28 July 2021 Friendly	Antalyaspor (Turkey)	1–1	(Turkey) Ümraniyespor	Erzurum, Turkey
17:45 TRT (UTC+3)	Fredy 60'		Kehinde 7'	Stadium: Erzurum High Altitude Training Center 1

1 August 2021 Friendly	Konyaspor (Turkey)	1–0	(Turkey) Antalyaspor	Erzurum, Turkey
17:00 TRT (UTC+3)	Cikalleshi 90+2'			Stadium: Kazım Karabekir Stadium

3 August 2021 Friendly	Antalyaspor (Turkey)	0–1	(Turkey) Altay	Erzurum, Turkey
17:00 TRT (UTC+3)			Paixão 89'	Stadium: Erzurum High Altitude Training Center 1

6 August 2021 Friendly	BB Erzurumspor (Turkey)	0–2	(Turkey) Antalyaspor	Erzurum, Turkey
16:00 TRT (UTC+3)			Wright 85', 87'	Stadium: Kazım Karabekir Stadium

=== Mid-season ===
4 September 2021 Friendly	Antalyaspor (Turkey)	2–1	(Turkey) Çaykur Rizespor	Antalya, Turkey
19:00 TRT (UTC+3)	Ghacha 53'; Wright 60'		Đoković 51'	Stadium: Gloria Sports Arena

13 November 2021 Friendly	Antalyaspor (Turkey)	1–1	(Turkey) Samsunspor	Antalya, Turkey
17:30 TRT (UTC+3)	Koç 90+1'		Öztekin 77'	Stadium: Atilla Vehbi Konuk Training Center

29 January 2022 Friendly	Antalyaspor (Turkey)	0–0	(Ukraine) Metalist 1925 Kharkiv	Antalya, Turkey
17:30 TRT (UTC+3)				Stadium: Papillon Sports Centre - Field A

25 April 2022 Global Tour for Peace	Antalyaspor (Turkey)	1–2	(Ukraine) Shakhtar Donetsk	Antalya, Turkey
20:30 TRT (UTC+3)	Erdilman 9'		Solomon 21'; Topalov 76'	Stadium: Antalya Stadium

== Competitions ==
=== Overview ===
Competition	First match	Last match	Starting round	Final position	Record							
Competition	First match	Last match	Starting round	Final position	Pld	W	D	L	GF	GA	GD	Win %
Süper Lig	15 August 2021	20 May 2022	Matchday 1	7th	38	16	11	11	54	47	+7	42.11
Turkish Cup	28 October 2021	1 March 2022	Third round	Quarter-finals	5	4	0	1	13	3	+10	80.00
Turkish Super Cup	5 January 2022		Final	Runners-up	1	0	1	0	1	1	+0	0.00
Total					44	20	12	12	68	51	+17	45.45

Source: Soccerway

=== Süper Lig ===
==== League table ====
Pos	Team	Pld	W	D	L	GF	GA	GD	Pts
5	Alanyaspor	38	19	7	12	67	58	+9	64
6	Beşiktaş	38	15	14	9	56	48	+8	59 (Note: Beşiktaş finished ahead of Antalyaspor on head-to-head points: Antalyaspor 2–3 Beşiktaş, Beşiktaş 0–0 Antalyaspor.)
7	Antalyaspor	38	16	11	11	54	47	+7	59
8	Fatih Karagümrük	38	16	9	13	47	52	−5	57
9	Adana Demirspor	38	15	10	13	60	47	+13	55

Source: Süper Lig
Rules for classification: 1) Points; 2) Head-to-head points; 3) Head-to-head goal difference; 4) Head-to-head goals scored; 5) Goal difference; 6) Goals scored; 7) Play-off.

==== Results summary ====
Overall								Home						Away					
Pld	W	D	L	GF	GA	GD	Pts	W	D	L	GF	GA	GD	W	D	L	GF	GA	GD
38	16	11	11	54	47	+7	59	10	6	3	34	19	+15	6	5	8	20	28	−8

Last updated: 20 May 2022.
Source: See Results

==== Results by round ====
Round	1	2	3	4	5	6	7	8	9	10	11	12	13	14	15	16	17	18	19	20	21	22	23	24	25	26	27	28	29	30	31	32	33	34	35	36	37	38
Ground	H	A	H	A	H	A	H	H	A	H	H	H	A	H	A	H	A	H	A	A	H	A	H	A	H	A	A	H	A	H	A	H	A	H	A	H	A	H
Result	D	L	W	L	L	D	W	L	D	L	W	W	L	W	L	W	L	D	L	L	D	L	D	D	W	W	D	W	W	W	W	W	W	D	D	W	W	D
Position	9	15	11	15	16	17	13	14	15	17	14	14	13	11	15	12	14	14	15	15	15	17	17	17	15	14	14	13	12	10	9	9	8	8	8	7	7	7

Updated to match(es) played on 20 May 2022. Source: Competitive matches
A = Away; H = Home; W = Win; D = Draw; L = Loss

==== Matches ====
15 August 2021 1	Antalyaspor	1–1	Göztepe	Antalya
21:45 TRT (UTC+3)	Ghacha (yellow card) 17'; Poli (yellow card) 19'; Fredy 32' (pen.); Özmert (yellow card) 71'	Report	Nukan (yellow card) 18'; Jahović (yellow card) 20'; Ideye (yellow card) 88'; Arslanagić 90+2', (yellow card) 90+2'; Ndiaye (yellow card) 90+6'	Stadium: Antalya Stadium; Attendance: 1,146; Referee: Yasin Kol

22 August 2021 2	Fenerbahçe	2–0	Antalyaspor	Istanbul
21:45 TRT (UTC+3)	Sangaré (yellow card) 62'; Zajc 89'; Valencia 90+2'	Report	Naldo (yellow card) 90+3'; Boffin (yellow card) 90+6'	Stadium: Şükrü Saracoğlu Stadium; Attendance: 8,637; Referee: Halil Umut Meler

27 August 2021 3	Antalyaspor	3–2	Çaykur Rizespor	Antalya
20:30 TRT (UTC+3)	Wright 18', 54' (pen.), 90+10' (pen.); Vural (yellow card) 80'; Özmert (yellow card) 90+2'	Report	Gönül (yellow card) 26'; Đoković 61', 90+3' (pen.); Dabo (yellow card) 90+3'	Stadium: Antalya Stadium; Attendance: 1,258; Referee: Özgür Yankaya

13 September 2021 4	Gaziantep	2–0	Antalyaspor	Gaziantep
20:00 TRT (UTC+3)	Figueiredo (yellow card) 28'; Niyaz (yellow card) 42'; Demir 54' (pen.); Kitsiou (yellow card) 88'; Güvenç (yellow card) 90+7'; El Messaoudi (yellow card) 90+8'; Mendyl 90+9'	Report	Poli (yellow card) 24'; Naldo (yellow card) 77'	Stadium: Gaziantep Stadium; Attendance: 1,813; Referee: Suat Arslanboğa

18 September 2021 5	Antalyaspor	2–3	Beşiktaş	Antalya
19:00 TRT (UTC+3)	Wright 42'; Sarı 45+1'	Report	Yılmaz 49', (yellow card) 66'; Batshuayi 65'; Ghezzal 76'	Stadium: Antalya Stadium; Attendance: 5,877; Referee: Ali Şansalan

21 September 2021 6	Fatih Karagümrük	0–0	Antalyaspor	Istanbul
17:00 TRT (UTC+3)	Ugur (yellow card) 40'; Durmaz (yellow card) 44'; Arveladze (yellow card) 85'; Balkovec (yellow card) 87'	Report	Wright (yellow card) 28'; Crivelli (yellow card) 48'	Stadium: Atatürk Olympic Stadium; Attendance: 199; Referee: Arda Kardeşler

25 September 2021 7	Antalyaspor	1–0	Yeni Malatyaspor	Antalya
16:00 TRT (UTC+3)	Bayrakdar (yellow card) 66'; Naldo (yellow card) 81'; Vural 89'	Report	Aabid (yellow card) 80'	Stadium: Antalya Stadium; Attendance: 1,515; Referee: Mert Güzenge

1 October 2021 8	Antalyaspor	1–2	Adana Demirspor	Antalya
20:00 TRT (UTC+3)	Wright (yellow card) 32'; Sarı (yellow card) 45+2'; Balcı 59'; Fredy (yellow card) 62'	Report	Balotelli 42', (yellow card) 62'; Vargas 79'	Stadium: Antalya Stadium; Attendance: 4,472; Referee: Volkan Bayarslan

16 October 2021 9	Sivasspor	2–2	Antalyaspor	Sivas
16:00 TRT (UTC+3)	Osmanpaşa 10'; Kayode 45+4'; Pedro Henrique (yellow card) 81'; Yatabaré (yellow card) 82'	Report	Balcı (yellow card) 9'; Fredy 24', (yellow card) 84'; Sinik 42'; Boffin (yellow card) 45+4'; Amilton (yellow card) 48'; Crivelli (yellow card) 56'; Vural (yellow card) 90+6'	Stadium: New Sivas 4 Eylül Stadium; Attendance: 2,745; Referee: Mete Kalkavan

24 October 2021 10	Antalyaspor	1–2	İstanbul Başakşehir	Antalya
16:00 TRT (UTC+3)	Ghacha 90+5'	Report	Özcan 32', 56'; Caiçara (yellow card) 79'	Stadium: Antalya Stadium; Attendance: 4,072; Referee: Yaşar Kemal Uğurlu

1 November 2021 11	Giresunspor	1–2	Antalyaspor	Giresun
20:00 TRT (UTC+3)	Diabaté (yellow card) 30', (goal) 90+5' (pen.); Sankharé (yellow card) 86'; Akdağ (yellow card) 90+3'; Piri (yellow card) 90+4'	Report	Fredy 20', 49'; Bayrakdar (yellow card) 29'; Naldo (yellow card) 45'; Albayrak (yellow card) 88'; Boffin (yellow card) 90+3'; Amilton (yellow card) 90+4'	Stadium: Çotanak Sports Complex; Attendance: 5,014; Referee: Mete Kalkavan

6 November 2021 12	Antalyaspor	1–0	Altay	Antalya
16:00 TRT (UTC+3)	Mukairu 49'; Fredy (yellow card) 86'	Report	Thiam (yellow card) 22'; Thaciano (yellow card) 82'; Öztürk (yellow card) 90+3'	Stadium: Antalya Stadium; Attendance: 2,794; Referee: Mert Güzenge

20 November 2021 13	Hatayspor	3–1	Antalyaspor	Antakya
13:30 TRT (UTC+3)	Öksüz (yellow card) 21'; El Kaabi 45+1'; Ribeiro 69'; Kuruçuk (yellow card) 79'; Diouf 85' (pen.)	Report	Sinik (yellow card) 35'; Mukairu (yellow card) 40', (goal) 45+3'; Zehir (yellow card) 88'	Stadium: New Hatay Stadium; Attendance: 4,912; Referee: Tugay Kaan Numanoğlu

27 November 2021 14	Antalyaspor	3–0	Alanyaspor	Antalya
13:30 TRT (UTC+3)	Balcı 40'; Amilton (yellow card) 54'; Mukairu 68'; Floranus 90'	Report	Awaziem (yellow card) 35'; Bingöl (yellow card) 59' (yellow-red card) 65'	Stadium: Antalya Stadium; Attendance: 2,813; Referee: Ali Şansalan

5 December 2021 15	Kayserispor	2–0	Antalyaspor	Kayseri
13:30 TRT (UTC+3)	Thiam 11', 17' (pen.); Gavranović (yellow card) 14' (yellow-red card) 34'; Kolovetsios (yellow card) 45+6' (yellow-red card) 58'; Civelek (yellow card) 72'; Lung (yellow card) 90+3'	Report	Poli (yellow card) 19'; Amilton (yellow card) 45+6'; Sinik (yellow card) 72'; Vural (yellow card) 90'	Stadium: Kadir Has Stadium; Attendance: 3,165; Referee: Halil Umut Meler

11 December 2021 16	Antalyaspor	2–1	Trabzonspor	Antalya
19:00 TRT (UTC+3)	Fredy 34' (pen.), (yellow card) 83'; Toköz 73' (o.g.)	Report	Cornelius 24'; Ié (yellow card) 32'; Peres (yellow card) 69'; Koita (yellow card) 80'; Djaniny (yellow card) 88'	Stadium: Antalya Stadium; Attendance: 10,371; Referee: Zorbay Küçük

18 December 2021 17	Konyaspor	1–0	Antalyaspor	Konya
16:00 TRT (UTC+3)	Skubic (yellow card) 2'; Hadžiahmetović (yellow card) 29'; Dikmen (yellow card) 35'; Gürler (yellow card) 62'; Çekiçi 90+2', (yellow card) 90+3'	Report	Amilton (yellow card) 25'; Ghacha (yellow card) 89'	Stadium: Konya Metropolitan Municipality Stadium; Attendance: 6,882; Referee: Arda Kardeşler

21 December 2021 18	Antalyaspor	1–1	Kasımpaşa	Antalya
17:00 TRT (UTC+3)	Naldo 38'; Poli (yellow card) 88'; Fredy (yellow card) 90'	Report	Hadergjonaj (yellow card) 40'; Eysseric (yellow card) 56'; Donk (yellow card) 60'; Taşkıran (yellow card) 83'; Bozok 90+2'	Stadium: Antalya Stadium; Attendance: 2,399; Referee: Yaşar Kemal Uğurlu

25 December 2021 19	Galatasaray	2–0	Antalyaspor	Istanbul
16:00 TRT (UTC+3)	Kara (yellow card) 28'; Feghouli 45+1'; Marcão (yellow card) 49'; Aktürkoğlu 52', (yellow card) 78'; Çağlayan (yellow card) 90+5'	Report	Naldo (yellow card) 21'; Sarı (yellow card) 55'; Milošević (yellow card) 84'	Stadium: Nef Stadium; Attendance: 10,150; Referee: Ali Şansalan

9 January 2022 20	Göztepe	4–0	Antalyaspor	İzmir
16:00 TRT (UTC+3)	Nukan 22'; Arslanagić (yellow card) 28' (yellow-red card) 67'; Ndiaye 51' (pen.), 60', 78'	Report	Sarı (yellow card) 49'	Stadium: Gürsel Aksel Stadium; Attendance: 8,080; Referee: Hüseyin Göçek

15 January 2022 21	Antalyaspor	1–1	Fenerbahçe	Antalya
19:00 TRT (UTC+3)	Sarı (yellow card) 71'; Fredy (yellow card) 71'; Sinik 81'; Kudryashov (yellow card) 90+7'	Report	Kadıoğlu (yellow card) 30'; Sosa 72'	Stadium: Antalya Stadium; Attendance: 13,394; Referee: Atilla Karaoğlan

20 January 2022 22	Çaykur Rizespor	2–1	Antalyaspor	Rize
17:00 TRT (UTC+3)	Baiano (yellow card) 27'; Pohjanpalo 43' (pen.); Gönül 58'; Ay (yellow card) 80'	Report	Wright 37'; Poli (yellow card) 42'; Vural (yellow card) 69' (yellow-red card) 90+7'	Stadium: Yeni Rize Şehir Stadium; Attendance: 1,616; Referee: Yaşar Kemal Uğurlu

23 January 2022 23	Antalyaspor	0–0	Gaziantep	Antalya
16:00 TRT (UTC+3)	Crivelli (yellow card) 72'; Fernando (yellow card) 89'; Sinik (yellow card) 90+6'	Report	Djilobodji (yellow card) 72'	Stadium: Antalya Stadium; Attendance: 3,318; Referee: Yasin Kol

6 February 2022 24	Beşiktaş	0–0	Antalyaspor	Istanbul
19:00 TRT (UTC+3)	Ghezzal (yellow card) 64'; Souza (yellow card) 78'; Rosier (yellow card) 80'; Yalçın (yellow card) 90+1'; Pjanić (yellow card) 90+6' (yellow-red card) 90+7'	Report	Naldo (yellow card) 34'; Luiz Adriano (yellow card) 49'; Vural (yellow card) 90+1'; Boffin (yellow card) 90+2'	Stadium: Vodafone Park; Attendance: 26,841; Referee: Abdulkadir Bitigen

13 February 2022 25	Antalyaspor	3–0	Fatih Karagümrük	Antalya
16:00 TRT (UTC+3)	Fernando 17'; Kudryashov 30'; Mehmedi (yellow card) 71', (goal) 85'	Report	Bistrović (yellow card) 58'; Biglia (yellow card) 68'; Viviano (yellow card) 71'	Stadium: Antalya Stadium; Attendance: 5,501; Referee: Halil Umut Meler

19 February 2022 26	Yeni Malatyaspor	1–2	Antalyaspor	Malatya
13:30 TRT (UTC+3)	Çiftpınar (yellow card) 45+2'; Çağıran 88'	Report	Luiz Adriano 7'; Fredy (yellow card) 41'; Fernando 59'	Stadium: New Malatya Stadium; Attendance: 953; Referee: Atilla Karaoğlan

25 February 2022 27	Adana Demirspor	0–0	Antalyaspor	Adana
20:30 TRT (UTC+3)		Report	Luiz Adriano (yellow card) 60'	Stadium: New Adana Stadium; Attendance: 15,150; Referee: Alper Ulusoy

6 March 2022 28	Antalyaspor	1–0	Sivasspor	Antalya
19:00 TRT (UTC+3)	Fernando 45+2'	Report		Stadium: Antalya Stadium; Attendance: 7,137; Referee: Cüneyt Çakır

14 March 2022 29	İstanbul Başakşehir	0–1	Antalyaspor	Istanbul
16:00 TRT (UTC+3)	Caiçara (yellow card) 37'; Şahiner (yellow card) 53'; Okaka (yellow card) 60'	Report	Wright 20'	Stadium: Başakşehir Fatih Terim Stadium; Attendance: 383; Referee: Zorbay Küçük

20 March 2022 30	Antalyaspor	4–1	Giresunspor	Antalya
13:30 TRT (UTC+3)	Sarı 5'; Sinik (yellow card) 10', (goal) 62'; Floranus (yellow card) 66'; Fernando (yellow card) 78', (goal) 81'; Naldo 90+4'	Report	Gümüşkaya 67' (pen.)	Stadium: Antalya Stadium; Attendance: 7,051; Referee: Mustafa Kürşad Filiz

2 April 2022 31	Altay	1–2	Antalyaspor	İzmir
16:00 TRT (UTC+3)	Thaciano (yellow card) 44'; Öztürk (yellow card) 45+2'; Özkaya (yellow card) 45+3'; Akça (yellow card) 56'; Rayyan (yellow card) 69', (goal) 74' (pen.)	Report	Luiz Adriano 25'; Gümüş (yellow card) 42'; Ndao (yellow card) 45+3'; Wright 70'	Stadium: Alsancak Mustafa Denizli Stadium; Attendance: 5,143; Referee: Yasin Kol

11 April 2022 32	Antalyaspor	4–1	Hatayspor	Antalya
20:30 TRT (UTC+3)	Fernando (yellow card) 8'; Wright 16', 35'; Naldo 29'; Luiz Adriano 55'	Report	Diouf 38'; Ribeiro (red card) 67'; Lobzhanidze (yellow card) 74'	Stadium: Antalya Stadium; Attendance: 7,932; Referee: Kadir Sağlam

16 April 2022 33	Alanyaspor	1–3	Antalyaspor	Antalya
16:00 TRT (UTC+3)	Karaca (yellow card) 38'; Diédhiou 78'	Report	Wright 17'; Balcı (yellow card) 19'; Özmert (yellow card) 36'; Bayrakdar 40', 58'; Vural (yellow card) 86'	Stadium: Bahçeşehir Okulları Stadium; Attendance: 2,435; Referee: Yaşar Kemal Uğurlu

24 April 2022 34	Antalyaspor	1–1	Kayserispor	Antalya
20:30 TRT (UTC+3)	Wright 56'	Report	Çetin (yellow card) 31'; Attamah 52'	Stadium: Antalya Stadium; Attendance: 9,997; Referee: Cüneyt Çakır

30 April 2022 35	Trabzonspor	2–2	Antalyaspor	Trabzon
20:30 TRT (UTC+3)	Cornelius 3'; Višća (yellow card) 27'; Toköz 62'; Hamšík (yellow card) 65'; Bakasetas (yellow card) 90+4'	Report	Sarı (yellow card) 43'; Ndao 51', (yellow card) 63'; Naldo (yellow card) 57'; Wright 80'; Vural (yellow card) 90+4'	Stadium: Şenol Güneş Sports Complex; Attendance: 38,917; Referee: Atilla Karaoğlan

9 May 2022 36	Antalyaspor	3–2	Konyaspor	Antalya
20:00 TRT (UTC+3)	Luiz Adriano 9' (yellow card) 90+2'; Ndao 16'; Wright 66' (pen.)	Report	Guilherme 5' (pen.); Çekiçi 13'; Demirbağ (yellow card) 30'	Stadium: Antalya Stadium; Attendance: 10,049; Referee: Mete Kalkavan

15 May 2022 37	Kasımpaşa	2–4	Antalyaspor	Istanbul
19:00 TRT (UTC+3)	Bozok 37', 90+6' (pen.); Fall (yellow card) 63'; Torun (yellow card) 90'; Canpolat (yellow card) 90+2'	Report	Fredy 19'; Naldo 47'; Wright 53'; Floranus (yellow card) 63'; Hadergjonaj 70' (o.g.); Boffin (yellow card) 90+7'	Stadium: Recep Tayyip Erdoğan Stadium; Attendance: 1,435; Referee: Mert Güzenge

20 May 2022 38	Antalyaspor	1–1	Galatasaray	Antalya
20:00 TRT (UTC+3)	Ndao 45'; Kudryashov (yellow card) 78'; Fernando (yellow card) 81'	Report	Mohamed 77'; Cicâldău (yellow card) 79'; Boey (yellow card) 90+5'	Stadium: Antalya Stadium; Attendance: 19,003; Referee: Yasin Kol

=== Turkish Cup ===
28 October 2021 Third round	Antalyaspor	5–0	Diyarbekirspor	Antalya
18:00 TRT (UTC+3)	Ghacha 1'; Milošević 5'; Bayrakdar 15', 20'; Mukairu 83'	Report		Stadium: Antalya Stadium; Referee: Çağdaş Altay

30 November 2021 Fourth round	Antalyaspor	4–0	Amed	Antalya
21:00 TRT (UTC+3)	Albayrak (yellow card) 30'; Bayrakdar 33', 85'; Ghacha 69'; Erdilman 81'	Report	Tarhan (yellow card) 79'	Stadium: Antalya Stadium; Referee: Mustafa Kürşad Filiz

28 December 2021 Fifth round	Antalyaspor	2–1	Giresunspor	Antalya
17:00 TRT (UTC+3)	Ghacha 27'; Naldo 87'	Report	Yılmaz (yellow card) 41'; Nayir 56'; Serginho (yellow card) 70'; Suleymanov (yellow card) 90+3' (yellow-red card) 90+4'; Pérez (yellow card) 90+3'	Stadium: Antalya Stadium; Referee: Fırat Aydınus

9 February 2022 Round of 16	Hatayspor	0–2	Antalyaspor	Antakya
17:30 TRT (UTC+3)	Kuruçuk (yellow card) 26' (yellow-red card) 45+1'; Kahraba (yellow card) 45+2'; Diouf (yellow card) 45+2'	Report	Ndao 83'; Wright 87'	Stadium: New Hatay Stadium; Referee: Mert Güzenge

1 March 2022 Quarter-finals	Trabzonspor	2–0	Antalyaspor	Trabzon
20:30 TRT (UTC+3)	Višća 12'; Özdemir (yellow card) 31', (goal) 89'; Hugo (yellow card) 84'	Report		Stadium: Şenol Güneş Sports Complex; Referee: Atilla Karaoğlan

=== Turkish Super Cup ===
5 January 2022 Final	Beşiktaş	1–1 (a.e.t.) (4–2 p)	Antalyaspor	Doha, Qatar
20:45 AST (UTC+3)	Hutchinson 33'; Pjanić (yellow card) 55'; Welinton (yellow card) 113'	Report	Sarı (yellow card) 4'; Boffin (yellow card) 60'; Hutchinson 74' (o.g.)	Stadium: Ahmed bin Ali Stadium; Referee: Halil Umut Meler
	Penalties
	Teixeira (penalty scored); Batshuayi (penalty scored); Hutchinson (penalty scored); Vida (penalty scored)		(penalty scored) Vural; (penalty missed) Erdilman; (penalty scored) Özmert; (penalty missed) Floranus

== Statistics ==
=== Goalscorers ===
Rank	No.	Pos	Nat	Player	Süper Lig	Turkish Cup	Turkish Super Cup	Total
1	9	FW	(United States)	Haji Wright	14	1	0	15
2	16	MF	(Angola)	Fredy	6	0	0	6
2	41	FW	(Turkey)	Gökdeniz Bayrakdar	2	4	0	6
4	4	DF	(Brazil)	Naldo	4	1	0	5
5	12	FW	(Nigeria)	Paul Mukairu	3	1	0	4
5	20	MF	(Brazil)	Fernando	4	0	0	4
5	27	FW	(Algeria)	Houssam Ghacha	1	3	0	4
5	28	FW	(Senegal)	Alassane Ndao	3	1	0	4
5	70	FW	(Brazil)	Luiz Adriano	4	0	0	4
10	7	MF	(Turkey)	Doğukan Sinik	3	0	0	3
11	77	DF	(Turkey)	Bünyamin Balcı	2	0	0	2
11	88	DF	(Turkey)	Veysel Sarı	2	0	0	2
13	2	DF	(Netherlands)	Sherel Floranus	1	0	0	1
13	10	MF	(Bosnia and Herzegovina)	Deni Milošević	0	1	0	1
13	11	FW	(Turkey)	Güray Vural	1	0	0	1
13	13	DF	(Russia)	Fyodor Kudryashov	1	0	0	1
13	38	MF	(Turkey)	Mustafa Erdilman	0	1	0	1
Own goals					2	0	1	3
Totals					54	13	1	68
