= 2023–24 Antalyaspor season =

Antalyaspor
2023–24 season
- President: Sabri Gülel
- Head coach: Nuri Şahin (until 31 December); Sergen Yalçın (from 3 January)
- Stadium: Antalya Stadium
- Süper Lig: 10th
- Turkish Cup: Round of 16
- Top goalscorer: League: Adam Buksa (16); All: Adam Buksa (16)
- Average home league attendance: 11,757
- Biggest win: Antalyaspor 6–1 Kepezspor

The 2023–24 season was Antalyaspor's 58th season in existence and ninth consecutive in the Süper Lig. They also competed in the Turkish Cup.

== Players ==
=== First-team squad ===
As of 24 January 2024

Note: Flags indicate national team as defined under FIFA eligibility rules; some limited exceptions apply. Players may hold more than one non-FIFA nationality.

No.	Pos.	Nation	Player
1	GK	BRA	Helton Leite
3	DF	TUR	Bahadır Öztürk
4	DF	KOS	Amar Gërxhaliu
5	MF	TUR	Mevlüt Han Ekelik
6	MF	MKD	Erdal Rakip
7	DF	TUR	Bünyamin Balcı
8	MF	BIH	Dario Šarić (on loan from Palermo)
9	FW	POL	Adam Buksa (on loan from Lens)
10	FW	SWE	Sam Larsson
11	DF	TUR	Güray Vural
12	GK	TUR	Kağan Arıcan
16	MF	ISR	Ramzi Safouri
17	DF	GER	Erdoğan Yeşilyurt
18	MF	POL	Jakub Kałuziński

No.	Pos.	Nation	Player
19	MF	GER	Ufuk Akyol
20	MF	BIH	Deni Milošević
21	DF	TUR	Ömer Toprak
22	MF	NED	Sander van de Streek
23	GK	TUR	Ataberk Dadakdeniz
27	DF	TUR	Mert Yılmaz
34	GK	TUR	Doğukan Özkan
44	DF	BRA	Naldo
72	DF	TUR	Harun Toprak
77	MF	KOS	Zymer Bytyqi
80	MF	TUR	Emre Uzun
89	DF	TUR	Veysel Sarı (captain)
97	FW	COD	Britt Assombalonga

=== Other players under contract ===
Note: Flags indicate national team as defined under FIFA eligibility rules; some limited exceptions apply. Players may hold more than one non-FIFA nationality.

No.	Pos.	Nation	Player
—	DF	TUR	Mevlüt Emir Gürlek
—	DF	TUR	Muhammed Emin Özkul
—	DF	TUR	Berat Onur Pınar

No.	Pos.	Nation	Player
—	FW	TUR	Mehmet İlhan
—	FW	TUR	Seyit Niyazi Özcan
—	FW	TUR	Mert Selçuk

=== Out on loan ===
Note: Flags indicate national team as defined under FIFA eligibility rules; some limited exceptions apply. Players may hold more than one non-FIFA nationality.

No. / Pos. / Nation / Player; — / DF / TUR / Efecan Gülerce (at Silivrispor until 30 June 2024)	No. / Pos. / Nation / Player; — / DF / TUR / Erkan Eyibil (at Ankara Keçiörengücü until 30 June 2024)

== Transfers ==
=== In ===
Pos.	Player	Transferred from	Fee	Date	Source
FW	(Poland) Adam Buksa	(France) Lens	Loan	18 July 2023	
MF	(Kosovo) Zymer Bytyqi	(Greece) Olympiacos	Undisclosed	1 August 2023	
FW	(Philippines) Gerrit Holtmann	(Germany) VfL Bochum	Loan	5 August 2023	
MF	(Democratic Republic of the Congo) Britt Assombalonga	(England) Watford	Free	8 August 2023	
MF	(Netherlands) Sander van de Streek	(Netherlands) Utrecht	Free	18 August 2023	

=== Out ===
Pos.	Player	Transferred to	Fee	Date	Source
DF	(Curaçao) Sherel Floranus	(Netherlands) Almere City	Free	1 August 2023	
FW	(United States) Haji Wright	(England) Coventry City	€9,000,000	4 August 2023	
MF	(Brazil) Fernando	(United Arab Emirates) Al-Jazira	Undisclosed	5 August 2023	

== Pre-season and friendlies ==
Win Draw Loss

24 July 2023 Friendly	Antalyaspor (Turkey)	0–0	(Turkey) Çaykur Rizespor	Erzurum
16:30 UTC+3				Stadium: Yüksek İrtifa Kamp Merkezi

29 July 2023 Friendly	Antalyaspor (Turkey)	0–2	(Turkey) Sivasspor	Erzurum
13:00 UTC+3			Arslan 4'; N'Jie 61'

2 August 2023 Friendly	Pendikspor (Turkey)	1–1	(Turkey) Antalyaspor	Istanbul
19:30 UTC+3	Bitin 35'		Buksa 27'	Stadium: Çınardere Erol Kaya Tesisleri

5 August 2023 Friendly	Hatayspor (Turkey)	2–1	(Turkey) Antalyaspor	Istanbul
19:00 UTC+3	Yıldırım 33'; Fernandes 78'		Buksa 18'	Stadium: Atatürk Olympic Stadium

== Competitions ==
=== Overall record ===
Competition	First match	Last match	Starting round	Final position	Record							
Competition	First match	Last match	Starting round	Final position	Pld	W	D	L	GF	GA	GD	Win %
Süper Lig	11 August 2023	24 May 2024	Matchday 1	10th	38	12	13	13	44	49	−5	31.58
Turkish Cup	1 November 2023	8 February 2024	Third round	Round of 16	4	3	0	1	12	4	+8	75.00
Total					42	15	13	14	56	53	+3	35.71

Source: Soccerway

=== Süper Lig ===
==== League table ====
Pos	Team	Pld	W	D	L	GF	GA	GD	Pts
8	Alanyaspor	38	12	16	10	53	50	+3	52
9	Rizespor	38	14	8	16	48	58	−10	50
10	Antalyaspor	38	12	13	13	44	49	−5	49
11	Gaziantep	38	12	8	18	50	57	−7	44 (Note: Gaziantep are ahead of Adana Demirspor on head-to-head points: Gaziantep 2–2 Adana Demirspor, Adana Demirspor 1–6 Gaziantep.)
12	Adana Demirspor	38	10	14	14	54	61	−7	44

Source: Süper Lig
Rules for classification: 1) Points; 2) Head-to-head points; 3) Head-to-head goal difference; 4) Head-to-head goals scored; 5) Goal difference; 6) Goals scored; 7) Play-off.

==== Results summary ====
Overall								Home						Away					
Pld	W	D	L	GF	GA	GD	Pts	W	D	L	GF	GA	GD	W	D	L	GF	GA	GD
38	12	13	13	44	49	−5	49	8	8	3	22	18	+4	4	5	10	22	31	−9

Source: Trendyol Süper Lig

==== Results by round ====
Round	1	2	3	4	5	6	7	8	9	10	11	12	13	14	15	16	17	18	19	20	21	22	23	24	25	26	27	28	29	30	31	32	33	34	35	36	37	38
Ground	A	H	A	H	A	H	A	H	A	H	H	A	H	A	H	A	H	A	H	H	A	H	A	H	A	H	A	H	A	A	H	A	H	A	H	A	H	A
Result	L	D	D	D	L	W	W	L	L	W	W	W	D	D	W	W	D	L	D	D	D	W	D	L	L	D	L	W	L	W	D	L	W	L	L	L	W	D
Position	17	15	15	15	16	13	10	13	14	12	8	7	7	9	7	5	5	6	7	7	7	6	6	7	7	7	9	8	8	8	8	9	8	10	10	10	10	10

Source: Trendyol Süper Lig
A = Away; H = Home; W = Win; D = Draw; L = Loss

==== Matches ====
11 August 2023 1	Trabzonspor	1–0	Antalyaspor	Trabzon
21:00	Denswil 8'	Report	Rakip (yellow card) 46'	Stadium: Şenol Güneş Sports Complex; Attendance: 30,692; Referee: Zorbay Küçük

18 August 2023 2	Antalyaspor	1–1	Konyaspor	Antalya
21:00	Kałuziński (yellow card) 55'; Holtmann (yellow card) 74'; Vural 87'	Report	Cikalleshi 60' (pen.); Oğuz (yellow card) 86'; Paz (yellow card) 90+7'	Stadium: Antalya Stadium; Attendance: 8,396; Referee: Ali Şansalan

26 August 2023 3	Sivasspor	1–1	Antalyaspor	Sivas
21:45	Rodrigues 36', (yellow card) 72'; Manaj (yellow card) 90+5'; Sáiz (yellow card) 90+5'	Report	Larsson 10'; Assombalonga (yellow card) 20'; Šarić (yellow card) 42'; Akyol (yellow card) 90+2'	Stadium: New Sivas 4 Eylül Stadium; Attendance: 4,631; Referee: Ümit Öztürk

2 September 2023 4	Antalyaspor	1–1	Kayserispor	Antalya
21:45				Stadium: Corendon Airlines Park; Referee: Yasin Kol

17 September 2023 5	Fenerbahçe	3–2	Antalyaspor	Istanbul
17:00				Stadium: Şükrü Saracoğlu Stadium; Referee: Halil Umut Meler

23 September 2023 6	Antalyaspor	2–0	Samsunspor	Antalya
20:00				Stadium: Corendon Airlines Park; Attendance: 7,761; Referee: Arda Kardeşler

30 September 2023 7	İstanbulspor	1–2	Antalyaspor	Istanbul
16:00				Stadium: Esenyurt Necmi Kadıoğlu Stadium; Referee: Çağdaş Altay

7 October 2023 8	Antalyaspor	0–2	Galatasaray	Antalya
19:00				Stadium: Corendon Airlines Park; Attendance: 22,308; Referee: Zorbay Küçük

21 October 2023 9	Gaziantep	1–0	Antalyaspor	Gaziantep
16:00				Stadium: Gaziantep Stadium; Referee: Atilla Karaoğlan

29 October 2023 10	Antalyaspor	1–0	İstanbul Başakşehir	Antalya
19:00				Stadium: Corendon Airlines Park; Referee: Ümit Öztürk

5 November 2023 11	Antalyaspor	3–2	Beşiktaş	Antalya
19:00				Stadium: Corendon Airlines Park; Referee: Yaşar Kemal Uğurlu

10 November 2023 12	Ankaragücü	0–4	Antalyaspor	Ankara
20:00				Stadium: Eryaman Stadium; Referee: Direnç Tonusluoğlu

26 November 2023 13	Antalyaspor	0–0	Çaykur Rizespor	Antalya
16:00				Stadium: Corendon Airlines Park; Referee: Turgut Doman

1 December 2023 14	Hatayspor	3–3	Antalyaspor	Mersin
20:00				Stadium: Mersin Stadium; Referee: Yiğit Arslan

9 December 2023 15	Antalyaspor	2–1	Fatih Karagümrük	Antalya
13:30				Stadium: Corendon Airlines Park; Referee: Çağdaş Altay

20 December 2023 17	Antalyaspor	0–0	Kasımpaşa	Antalya
20:00				Stadium: Corendon Airlines Park; Referee: Kadir Sağlam

24 December 2023 18	Adana Demirspor	2–1	Antalyaspor	Adana
16:00				Stadium: New Adana Stadium; Referee: Burak Pakkan

5 January 2024 19	Antalyaspor	0–0	Alanyaspor	Antalya
20:00				Stadium: Corendon Airlines Park; Referee: Mert Güzenge

9 January 2024 16	Pendikspor	0–1	Antalyaspor	Istanbul
17:00				Stadium: Pendik Stadium; Referee: Oğuzhan Çakır

14 January 2024 20	Antalyaspor	1–1	Trabzonspor	Antalya
16:00				Stadium: Corendon Airlines Park; Referee: Bahattin Şimşek

21 January 2024 21	Konyaspor	1–1	Antalyaspor	Konya
16:00				Stadium: Konya Metropolitan Municipality Stadium; Referee: Zorbay Küçük

24 January 2024 22	Antalyaspor	2–1	Sivasspor	Antalya
20:00				Stadium: Corendon Airlines Park; Referee: Turgut Doman

29 January 2024 23	Kayserispor	1–1	Antalyaspor	Kayseri
17:00				Stadium: Kadir Has Stadium; Referee: Direnç Tonusluoğlu

3 February 2024 24	Antalyaspor	0–2	Fenerbahçe	Antalya
19:00 TRT (UTC+3)	Kałuziński (yellow card) 90+2'		Ünder 42'; Batshuayi 90+5'	Stadium: Corendon Airlines Park; Attendance: 23,153; Referee: Volkan Bayarslan

12 February 2024 25	Samsunspor	2–0	Antalyaspor	Samsun
20:00 TRT (UTC+3)	Mouandilmadji 59'; Muja 90+1'			Stadium: Samsun Stadium; Attendance: 16,212; Referee: Atilla Karaoğlan

17 February 2024 26	Antalyaspor	2–2	İstanbulspor	Antalya
13:30	Buksa 14', 16'		Gedikli 75'; Jackson 90+9' (pen.)	Stadium: Corendon Airlines Park; Referee: Mehmet Türkmen

26 February 2024 27	Galatasaray	2–1	Antalyaspor	Istanbul
20:00				Stadium: Rams Park; Referee: Abdulkadir Bitigen

4 March 2024 28	Antalyaspor	1–0	Gaziantep	Antalya
20:00				Stadium: Corendon Airlines Park

9 March 2024 29	İstanbul Başakşehir	1–0	Antalyaspor	Istanbul
19:00				Stadium: Başakşehir Fatih Terim Stadium

16 March 2024 30	Beşiktaş	1–2	Antalyaspor	Istanbul
20:30				Stadium: Tüpraş Stadyumu

2 April 2024 31	Antalyaspor	1–1	MKE Ankaragücü	Antalya
20:30				Stadium: Corendon Airlines Park

14 April 2024 32	Çaykur Rizespor	3–0	Antalyaspor	Rize
16:00				Stadium: Rize City Stadium

21 April 2024 33	Antalyaspor	2–1	Hatayspor	Antalya
19:00				Stadium: Corendon Airlines Park

29 April 2024 34	Fatih Karagümrük	4–1	Antalyaspor	Istanbul
20:00				Stadium: Atatürk Olympic Stadium

6 May 2024 35	Antalyaspor	1–2	Pendikspor	Antalya
20:00				Stadium: Corendon Airlines Park

12 May 2024 36	Kasımpaşa	3–1	Antalyaspor	Istanbul
19:00				Stadium: Recep Tayyip Erdoğan Stadium

17 May 2024 37	Antalyaspor	2–1	Adana Demirspor	Antalya
20:00	Mendoza 30' (o.g.); Yılmaz 74'		Aimbetov 65'	Stadium: Corendon Airlines Park; Referee: Turgut Doman

24 May 2024 38	Alanyaspor	1–1	Antalyaspor	Alanya
20:00	Hwang Ui-jo 3'		Buksa 80'	Stadium: Alanya Oba Stadium; Referee: Halil Umut Meler

=== Turkish Cup ===
1 November 2023 Third round	Antalyaspor	3–0	52 Orduspor	Antalya
19:30				Stadium: Antalya Stadium

5 December 2023 Fourth round	Antalyaspor	6–1	Kepez Belediyespor	Antalya
17:00		Report		Stadium: Antalya Stadium; Referee: Raşit Yorgancılar

17 January 2024 Fifth round	Antalyaspor	2–1	Pendikspor	Antalya
13:00	Akyol 50'; van de Streek 58'		Nayir 32'	Stadium: Antalya Stadium

8 February 2024 Round of 16	Antalyaspor	1–2	Beşiktaş	Antalya
20:45	Bytyqi 30'		Muleka 72', 89'	Stadium: Antalya Stadium
