= List of Turkish football transfers summer 2021 =

This is a list of Turkish football transfers in the 2021 summer transfer window by club. Only clubs in the 2021–22 Süper Lig are included.

== Süper Lig ==
=== Adana Demirspor ===
In:

No.	Pos.	Nation	Player
7	FW	COD	Britt Assombalonga (from (England) Middlesbrough)
9	FW	ITA	Mario Balotelli (from (Italy) Monza)
10	MF	MAR	Younès Belhanda (free agent)
11	MF	NGR	Babajide David (from (Denmark) Midtjylland, previously on loan at Hatayspor)
17	MF	TUR	Metehan Mimaroğlu (from Altınordu)
19	MF	ARG	Lucas Castro (from Fatih Karagümrük)
22	DF	NOR	Jonas Svensson (from (Netherlands) AZ)
23	MF	TUR	Yunus Akgün (on loan from Galatasaray)
35	GK	TUR	Ferhat Kaplan (from Antalyaspor)
49	GK	KOS	Arijanet Muric (on loan from (England) Manchester City)
67	MF	ISL	Birkir Bjarnason (from (Italy) Brescia)
77	FW	ARG	Matías Vargas (on loan from (Spain) Espanyol)
90	DF	FRA	Benjamin Stambouli (from (Germany) Schalke 04)
91	DF	CIV	Simon Deli (from (Belgium) Club Brugge, previously on loan at (Czech Republic) Slavia Prague)

Out:

No.	Pos.	Nation	Player
1	GK	LTU	Emilijus Zubas (released)
6	MF	MLI	Hamidou Traoré (to Giresunspor)
14	FW	GAM	Pa Dibba (to Eyüpspor)
20	MF	TUR	Volkan Şen (released)
70	MF	TUR	Sedat Şahintürk (on loan to Tuzlaspor)

=== Alanyaspor ===
In:

No.	Pos.	Nation	Player
4	MF	NED	Leroy Fer (from (Netherlands) Feyenoord)
8	MF	TUR	Ahmed Ildiz (from Yeni Malatyaspor)
14	FW	SEN	Famara Diédhiou (from (England) Bristol City)
15	DF	NGR	Chidozie Awaziem (on loan from (Portugal) Boavista)
17	FW	ANG	Wilson Eduardo (from (United Arab Emirates) Al Ain)
18	MF	POR	João Novais (on loan from (Portugal) Braga)
19	DF	SRB	Nemanja Milunović (from (Serbia) Red Star Belgrade)
21	MF	POR	Daniel Candeias (from Gençlerbirliği)
23	MF	TUR	Emre Akbaba (on loan from Galatasaray)
25	DF	SLO	Miha Mevlja (from (Russia) Sochi)
31	DF	COL	Cristian Borja (on loan from (Portugal) Braga)
70	MF	TUR	Oğuz Aydın (from Bucaspor 1928)

Out:

No.	Pos.	Nation	Player
4	DF	TUR	Alpay Çelebi (loan return to Beşiktaş, later loaned to Kocaelispor)
6	MF	TUR	Ceyhun Gülselam (to Altay)
8	MF	TUR	Salih Uçan (to Beşiktaş)
22	MF	TUR	Berkan Kutlu (to Galatasaray)
26	MF	GRE	Manolis Siopis (to Trabzonspor)
44	DF	ENG	Steven Caulker (to Fenerbahçe)

=== Altay ===
In:

No.	Pos.	Nation	Player
1	GK	POL	Mateusz Lis (from (Poland) Wisła Kraków)
2	DF	IRI	Mohammad Naderi (from (Iran) Esteghlal)
3	DF	SWE	Eric Björkander (from (Sweden) Mjällby)
5	MF	CIV	Serge Arnaud Aka (from (Egypt) El Gouna)
6	MF	TUR	Ceyhun Gülselam (from Alanyaspor)
9	FW	EGY	Ahmed Yasser Rayyan (on loan from (Egypt) Al Ahly)
10	MF	CHI	Martín Rodríguez (from (Chile) Colo-Colo)
11	FW	CIV	Daouda Bamba (from (Norway) Brann)
14	MF	CHI	César Pinares (from (Brazil) Grêmio)
16	MF	BRA	Thaciano (on loan from (Brazil) Grêmio, previously on loan at (Brazil) Bahia)

Out:

No.	Pos.	Nation	Player

=== Antalyaspor ===
In:

No.	Pos.	Nation	Player
2	DF	NED	Sherel Floranus (from (Netherlands) Heerenveen)
9	FW	USA	Haji Wright (on loan from (Denmark) SønderjyskE)
10	MF	BIH	Deni Milošević (from Konyaspor)
11	MF	TUR	Güray Vural (from Gaziantep)
15	MF	ITA	Andrea Poli (from (Italy) Bologna)
17	FW	FRA	Enzo Crivelli (on loan from İstanbul Başakşehir)
18	MF	GER	Ersin Zehir (from (Germany) FC St. Pauli, previously on loan at (Germany) VfB Lübeck)
21	MF	TUR	Erkan Eyibil (from (Germany) Mainz 05, previously on loan at (Netherlands) Go Ahead Eagles)
27	MF	ALG	Houssam Ghacha (from (Algeria) ES Sétif)
74	DF	TUR	Doğukan Nelik (from Akhisarspor)
99	GK	POR	Diogo Sousa (from (Portugal) Sporting CP)

Out:

No.	Pos.	Nation	Player
—	GK	TUR	Ferhat Kaplan (to Adana Demirspor)
—	FW	ARG	Gustavo Blanco Leschuk (on loan to (Spain) Eibar, previously on loan at (Spain) Real Oviedo)

=== Beşiktaş ===
In:

No.	Pos.	Nation	Player
2	DF	FRA	Valentin Rosier (from (Portugal) Sporting CP, previously on loan)
4	DF	ESP	Javi Montero (from (Spain) Atlético Madrid, previously on loan)
8	MF	TUR	Salih Uçan (from Alanyaspor)
9	FW	BEL	Michy Batshuayi (on loan from (England) Chelsea)
12	MF	GER	Can Bozdoğan (on loan from (Germany) Schalke 04)
14	MF	TUR	Mehmet Topal (from İstanbul Başakşehir)
15	MF	BIH	Miralem Pjanić (on loan from (Spain) Barcelona)
18	MF	ALG	Rachid Ghezzal (from (England) Leicester City, previously on loan)
28	FW	TUR	Kenan Karaman (from (Germany) Fortuna Düsseldorf)
34	GK	TUR	Mert Günok (from İstanbul Başakşehir)
77	DF	TUR	Umut Meraş (from (France) Le Havre)
90	MF	BRA	Alex Teixeira (from (China) Jiangsu)

Out:

No.	Pos.	Nation	Player
1	GK	TUR	Utku Yuvakuran (on loan to Fatih Karagümrük)
26	DF	TUR	Bilal Ceylan (on loan to Bandırmaspor)
41	MF	TUR	Kartal Yılmaz (on loan to Ümraniyespor)
99	FW	USA	Tyler Boyd (on loan to Çaykur Rizespor)
—	DF	TUR	Alpay Çelebi (on loan to Kocaelispor, previously on loan at Alanyaspor)
—	DF	TUR	Kerem Kalafat (on loan to Uşakspor, previously on loan at Giresunspor)
—	MF	TUR	Dorukhan Toköz (to Trabzonspor)
—	FW	TUR	Umut Nayir (to Giresunspor, previously on loan at (Croatia) Hajduk Split)

=== Çaykur Rizespor ===
In:

No.	Pos.	Nation	Player
3	DF	SWE	Sebastian Holmén (from (Netherlands) Willem II)
4	MF	TUR	Alper Potuk (from Ankaragücü)
9	FW	USA	Tyler Boyd (on loan from Beşiktaş)
11	MF	BRA	Ronaldo Mendes (from (United Arab Emirates) Al-Wasl)
14	MF	BFA	Bryan Dabo (from (Italy) Benevento)
19	FW	TUR	Deniz Hümmet (from (Sweden) Elfsborg, previously on loan at (Sweden) Örebro)
20	FW	FIN	Joel Pohjanpalo (on loan from (Germany) Bayer Leverkusen)
21	MF	RSA	Lebogang Phiri (from (France) EA Guingamp)
29	DF	COD	Nathan Monzango (on loan from (France) Amiens)
53	MF	COD	Yannick Bolasie (from (England) Everton, previously on loan at (England) Middlesbrough)
77	DF	TUR	Gökhan Gönül (from Fenerbahçe)
88	DF	TUR	Cemali Sertel (on loan from İstanbul Başakşehir)

Out:

No.	Pos.	Nation	Player
3	DF	GRE	Dimitrios Chatziisaias (to (Greece) Atromitos)
5	MF	TUR	Abdullah Durak (released)
11	MF	TUR	Tunay Torun (to Fatih Karagümrük)
13	DF	TUR	İsmail Köybaşı (to Trabzonspor)
14	FW	NOR	Alexander Søderlund (to (Norway) Haugesund)
17	MF	POL	Konrad Michalak (loan return to (Russia) Akhmat Grozny, later loaned to Konyaspor)
18	FW	PAR	Braian Samudio (to (Mexico) Toluca)
19	MF	SRB	Dušan Jovančić (to (Kazakhstan) Tobol, previously on loan)
21	FW	CZE	Milan Škoda (to (Czech Republic) Mladá Boleslav)
23	MF	GHA	Godfred Donsah (loan return to (Italy) Bologna, later released to (Italy) Crotone)
24	DF	AUT	Emir Dilaver (to (Croatia) Dinamo Zagreb)
37	FW	BRA	Fernando Andrade (loan return to (Portugal) Porto, later loaned to (Saudi Arabia) Al-Fayha)
53	DF	CRO	Dario Melnjak (to (Croatia) Hajduk Split)
54	MF	TUR	Mithat Pala (on loan to Afyonspor)
55	DF	UKR	Mykola Morozyuk (released)
66	MF	TUR	Doğan Erdoğan (to Gaziantep)

=== Fatih Karagümrük ===
In:

No.	Pos.	Nation	Player
5	DF	MAR	Medhi Benatia (from (Qatar) Al-Duhail)
7	FW	NGR	Ahmed Musa (from (Nigeria) Kano Pillars)
8	MF	ENG	Erhun Oztumer (from (England) Charlton Athletic, previously on loan at (England) Bristol Rovers)
9	MF	TUR	Emre Mor (on loan from (Spain) Celta Vigo)
10	MF	SWE	Jimmy Durmaz (from Galatasaray, previously on loan)
11	MF	TUR	Kerim Frei (from (Netherlands) Emmen)
18	MF	GER	Levent Mercan (on loan from (Germany) Schalke 04)
20	MF	TUR	Tunay Torun (from Çaykur Rizespor)
21	GK	TUR	Utku Yuvakuran (on loan from Beşiktaş)
22	FW	TUR	Samed Onur (from (Germany) Bayer Leverkusen)
25	DF	NED	Derrick Luckassen (on loan from (Netherlands) PSV, previously on loan at Kasımpaşa)
30	DF	TUR	Salih Dursun (from Gençlerbirliği)
72	FW	SRB	Aleksandar Pešić (from (Israel) Maccabi Tel Aviv)
77	MF	BEL	Adnan Ugur (on loan from (Netherlands) Fortuna Sittard, previously on loan at (Netherlands) Dordrecht)
86	DF	TUR	Burak Bekaroğlu (from Boluspor)
88	DF	TUR	Caner Erkin (from Fenerbahçe)
92	FW	CIV	Yann Karamoh (on loan from (Italy) Parma)
99	DF	ITA	Rayyan Baniya (from (Italy) Hellas Verona)

Out:

No.	Pos.	Nation	Player
4	DF	TUR	Koray Altınay (to Sivasspor)
5	DF	CHI	Enzo Roco (to (Spain) Elche)
9	FW	POL	Artur Sobiech (to (Poland) Lech Poznań)
11	FW	TUR	Mevlüt Erdinç (to Kocaelispor)
18	MF	SEN	Alassane Ndao (to (Saudi Arabia) Al-Ahli)
22	DF	TUR	Fatih Kuruçuk (to Hatayspor)
37	DF	ARG	Gastón Campi (loan return to Trabzonspor, later sold to (Portugal) Arouca)
80	FW	CHI	Cristóbal Jorquera (to Bursaspor)
89	MF	ARG	Lucas Castro (to Adana Demirspor)
90	FW	SUI	Kemal Ademi (loan return to Fenerbahçe, later sold to (Russia) Khimki)

=== Fenerbahçe ===
In:

No.	Pos.	Nation	Player
3	DF	KOR	Kim Min-jae (from (China) Beijing Guoan)
6	MF	GER	Max Meyer (from (Germany) 1. FC Köln)
9	FW	URU	Diego Rossi (on loan from (United States) LAFC)
11	FW	GER	Mërgim Berisha (from (Austria) Red Bull Salzburg)
15	FW	TAN	Mbwana Samatta (from (England) Aston Villa, previously on loan)
19	FW	TUR	Serdar Dursun (from (Germany) Darmstadt 98)
27	MF	POR	Miguel Crespo (from (Portugal) Estoril Praia)
33	DF	TUR	Çağtay Kurukalıp (from Kasımpaşa)
44	DF	ENG	Steven Caulker (from Alanyaspor)
77	MF	TUR	Burak Kapacak (from Bursaspor)

Out:

No.	Pos.	Nation	Player
2	MF	MAR	Nabil Dirar (to Kasımpaşa, previously on loan at (Belgium) Club Brugge)
6	DF	DEN	Zanka (to (England) Brentford, previously on loan at (Denmark) Copenhagen)
7	MF	TUR	Ozan Tufan (on loan to (England) Watford)
15	FW	TAN	Mbwana Samatta (on loan to (Belgium) Royal Antwerp)
18	DF	TUR	Sadık Çiftpınar (to Yeni Malatyaspor)
22	FW	SUI	Michael Frey (to (Belgium) Royal Antwerp, previously on loan at (Belgium) Waasland-Beveren)
27	FW	SEN	Mame Thiam (to Kayserispor)
28	DF	URU	Mauricio Lemos (on loan to (Belgium) Beerschot)
30	MF	TUR	Ömer Faruk Beyaz (to (Germany) VfB Stuttgart)
35	GK	TUR	Harun Tekin (to Kasımpaşa)
44	DF	ENG	Steven Caulker (on loan to Gaziantep)
66	MF	TUR	Oğuz Kağan Güçtekin (to (Belgium) Westerlo, previously on loan at Konyaspor)
77	DF	TUR	Gökhan Gönül (to Çaykur Rizespor)
88	DF	TUR	Caner Erkin (to Fatih Karagümrük)
99	FW	SUI	Kemal Ademi (to (Russia) Khimki, previously on loan at Fatih Karagümrük)
—	DF	TUR	Gürkan Başkan (to (Portugal) Famalicão)
—	MF	TUR	Barış Alıcı (to Gençlerbirliği, previously on loan at (Belgium) Westerlo)
—	MF	ARG	Diego Perotti (released)
—	MF	TUR	Deniz Türüç (to İstanbul Başakşehir, previously on loan)

=== Galatasaray ===
In:

No.	Pos.	Nation	Player
5	DF	TUR	Alpaslan Öztürk (from Göztepe)
6	DF	NED	Patrick van Aanholt (from (England) Crystal Palace)
12	MF	BRA	Gustavo Assunção (on loan from (Portugal) Famalicão)
21	MF	ROU	Olimpiu Moruțan (from (Romania) FCSB)
22	MF	TUR	Berkan Kutlu (from Alanyaspor)
25	DF	DEN	Victor Nelsson (from (Denmark) Copenhagen)
33	MF	ROU	Alexandru Cicâldău (from (Romania) Universitatea Craiova)
35	MF	TUR	Aytaç Kara (from Kasımpaşa)
53	MF	TUR	Barış Alper Yılmaz (from Ankara Keçiörengücü)
67	FW	TUR	Halil Dervişoğlu (on loan from (England) Brentford)
93	DF	FRA	Sacha Boey (from (France) Stade Rennes, previously on loan at (France) Dijon)

Out:

No.	Pos.	Nation	Player
2	DF	TUR	Şener Özbayraklı (to İstanbul Başakşehir)
7	MF	NGR	Henry Onyekuru (loan return to (France) Monaco, later sold to (Greece) Olympiacos)
9	FW	COL	Radamel Falcao (to (Spain) Rayo Vallecano)
14	DF	NOR	Martin Linnes (to (Norway) Molde)
15	DF	SUR	Ryan Donk (to Kasımpaşa)
20	MF	TUR	Emre Akbaba (on loan to Alanyaspor)
21	MF	SWE	Jimmy Durmaz (to Fatih Karagümrük, previously on loan)
23	DF	TUR	Emre Taşdemir (on loan to Giresunspor)
34	GK	TUR	Okan Kocuk (on loan to Giresunspor)
49	DF	NGR	Valentine Ozornwafor (on loan to (Belgium) Charleroi)
60	MF	TUR	Erkan Süer (on loan to Uşakspor)
70	MF	TUR	Yunus Akgün (on loan to Adana Demirspor)
77	MF	NGR	Jesse Sekidika (on loan to (Belgium) OH Leuven, previously on loan at Konyaspor)
80	FW	TUR	Ali Yavuz Kol (on loan to Ankara Keçiörengücü, previously on loan at Denizlispor)
88	DF	TUR	Gökay Güney (on loan to Bandırmaspor)
—	DF	TUR	Emin Bayram (on loan to Boluspor)
—	DF	TUR	Emirhan Civelek (to İskenderunspor, previously on loan at Akhisarspor)
—	DF	TUR	Süleyman Luş (on loan to Bandırmaspor)
—	MF	TUR	Abdussamed Karnuçu (on loan to Tuzlaspor)

=== Gaziantep ===
In:

No.	Pos.	Nation	Player
10	FW	TUR	Muhammet Demir (from İstanbul Başakşehir, previously on loan)
11	DF	TUR	Halil İbrahim Pehlivan (from Gençlerbirliği)
18	MF	MAR	Ahmed El Messaoudi (from (Netherlands) Groningen)
20	MF	TUR	Recep Niyaz (from Denizlispor)
21	MF	TUR	Doğan Erdoğan (from Çaykur Rizespor)
22	FW	NOR	Torgeir Børven (from Ankaragücü)
23	GK	TUR	Ekrem Kılıçarslan (from Hatayspor)
25	FW	BRA	João Figueiredo (on loan from (United Arab Emirates) Al-Wasl)
27	DF	MAR	Hamza Mendyl (on loan from (Germany) Schalke 04)
28	FW	CHI	Ángelo Sagal (from Denizlispor)
45	DF	ENG	Steven Caulker (on loan from Fenerbahçe)
52	MF	KAZ	Alexander Merkel (from (Saudi Arabia) Al Faisaly)
70	DF	GRE	Stelios Kitsiou (from Ankaragücü)
—	MF	UKR	Vladyslav Kobylyanskyi (from (Ukraine) Shakhtar Donetsk)

Out:

No.	Pos.	Nation	Player
11	MF	TUR	Güray Vural (to Antalyaspor)
13	DF	BRA	Júnior Morais (to (Romania) Rapid București)
14	FW	TUR	Bilal Başaçıkoğlu (to (Netherlands) Heracles Almelo)
24	DF	POR	Roderick Miranda (to (Australia) Melbourne Victory)
28	MF	POR	André Sousa (to Manisa)
55	MF	GHA	Abdul Aziz Tetteh (to (Poland) Widzew Łódź)

=== Giresunspor ===
In:

No.	Pos.	Nation	Player
6	MF	NED	Joey Pelupessy (from (England) Sheffield Wednesday)
8	MF	MLI	Hamidou Traoré (from Adana Demirspor)
10	FW	SEN	Souleymane Doukara (from (Saudi Arabia) Ettifaq)
16	DF	AUS	Aziz Behich (from İstanbul Başakşehir, previously on loan at Kayserispor)
17	FW	TUR	Umut Nayir (from Beşiktaş, previously on loan at (Croatia) Hajduk Split)
18	MF	MLI	Fousseni Diabaté (on loan from Trabzonspor, previously on loan at Göztepe)
19	MF	NZL	Joe Champness (from (Australia) Newcastle Jets, previously on loan at (Australia) Brisbane Roar)
23	DF	BRA	Douglas (from (Ukraine) Dnipro 1)
24	MF	BRA	Flávio (on loan from Trabzonspor)
25	DF	COL	Alexis Pérez (from (Argentina) Lanús)
26	DF	TUR	Emre Taşdemir (on loan from Galatasaray)
34	GK	TUR	Okan Kocuk (on loan from Galatasaray)
80	MF	TUR	Çekdar Orhan (from Akhisarspor)
93	FW	RUS	Magomed-Shapi Suleymanov (on loan from (Russia) Krasnodar)
—	DF	TUR	Osman Paşa Zorlu (from Adıyaman)

Out:

No.	Pos.	Nation	Player
10	FW	TUR	Eren Tozlu (released)
15	GK	TUR	Tolgahan Acar (released)
37	DF	TUR	Kerem Kalafat (loan return to Beşiktaş, later loaned to Uşakspor)
—	MF	TUR	Caner Hüseyin Bağ (released)

=== Göztepe ===
In:

No.	Pos.	Nation	Player
4	DF	TUR	Kahraman Demirtaş (from Altınordu)
6	DF	VEN	Wilker Ángel (from (Russia) Akhmat Grozny)
14	FW	GER	Makana Baku (from (Germany) Holstein Kiel, previously on loan at (Poland) Warta Poznań)
15	DF	BEL	Dino Arslanagić (from (Belgium) Gent)

Out:

No.	Pos.	Nation	Player
4	DF	BRA	Titi (to (Brazil) Fortaleza)
5	DF	TUR	Alpaslan Öztürk (to Galatasaray)
32	MF	AUT	Peter Žulj (loan return to (Belgium) Anderlecht, later sold to İstanbul Başakşehir)
—	MF	MLI	Fousseni Diabaté (loan return to Trabzonspor, later loaned to Giresunspor)

=== Hatayspor ===
In:

No.	Pos.	Nation	Player
6	DF	GUI	Simon Falette (from (Germany) Hannover 96)
8	MF	FRA	Mehdi Boudjemaa (from (France) EA Guingamp, previously on loan at (France) Laval)
12	DF	TUR	Kamil Çörekçi (from Trabzonspor)
22	DF	TUR	Fatih Kuruçuk (from Fatih Karagümrük)
23	DF	CAN	Sam Adekugbe (from (Norway) Vålerenga)
95	FW	CGO	Dylan Saint-Louis (from (France) Troyes)

Out:

No.	Pos.	Nation	Player
—	GK	TUR	Ekrem Kılıçarslan (to Gaziantep)
—	DF	CMR	Jean-Claude Billong (loan return to (Italy) Benevento, later sold to (France) Clermont Foot)
—	DF	MLI	Youssouf Koné (loan return to (France) Lyon, later loaned to (France) Troyes)
—	MF	NGR	Babajide David (loan return to (Denmark) Midtjylland, later sold to Adana Demirspor)

=== İstanbul Başakşehir ===
In:

No.	Pos.	Nation	Player
17	FW	TUR	Ahmed Kutucu (from (Germany) Schalke 04, previously on loan at (Netherlands) Heracles Almelo)
19	DF	TUR	Şener Özbayraklı (from Galatasaray)
23	MF	TUR	Deniz Türüç (from Fenerbahçe, previously on loan)
32	MF	AUT	Peter Žulj (from (Belgium) Anderlecht, previously on loan at Göztepe)
77	FW	ITA	Stefano Okaka (from (Italy) Udinese)

Out:

No.	Pos.	Nation	Player
—	GK	TUR	Mert Günok (to Beşiktaş)
—	DF	AUS	Aziz Behich (to Giresunspor, previously on loan at Kayserispor)
—	DF	TUR	Cemali Sertel (on loan to Çaykur Rizespor)
—	MF	TUR	Mehmet Topal (to Beşiktaş)
—	FW	FRA	Enzo Crivelli (on loan to Antalyaspor)
—	FW	TUR	Muhammet Demir (to Gaziantep, previously on loan)

=== Kasımpaşa ===
In:

No.	Pos.	Nation	Player
4	DF	SUR	Ryan Donk (from Galatasaray)
5	DF	NED	Jeffrey Bruma (from (Germany) VfL Wolfsburg)
9	FW	TUR	Umut Bozok (on loan from (France) Lorient, previously on loan at (France) Troyes)
14	FW	DEN	Nicolai Jørgensen (from (Netherlands) Feyenoord)
23	GK	TUR	Harun Tekin (from Fenerbahçe)
77	MF	MAR	Nabil Dirar (from Fenerbahçe, previously on loan at (Belgium) Club Brugge)

Out:

No.	Pos.	Nation	Player
—	DF	TUR	Çağtay Kurukalıp (to Fenerbahçe)
—	DF	NED	Derrick Luckassen (loan return to (Netherlands) PSV, later loaned to Fatih Karagümrük)
—	DF	BEL	Mickaël Tirpan (to (Netherlands) Fortuna Sittard, previously on loan)
—	MF	TUR	Aytaç Kara (to Galatasaray)
—	FW	GUI	Bengali-Fodé Koita (to Trabzonspor)
—	FW	GHA	Gilbert Koomson (to (Norway) Bodø/Glimt)

=== Kayserispor ===
In:

No.	Pos.	Nation	Player
5	DF	IRI	Majid Hosseini (from Trabzonspor)
7	MF	POR	Miguel Cardoso (from (Russia) Dynamo Moscow, previously on loan to (Portugal) Belenenses SAD)
10	MF	FRA	Olivier Kemen (from (France) Chamois Niortais)
21	DF	FRA	Lionel Carole (from (France) Strasbourg)
25	GK	NED	Bilal Bayazit (from (Netherlands) Vitesse)
26	FW	SEN	Mame Thiam (from Fenerbahçe)

Out:

No.	Pos.	Nation	Player
—	GK	TUR	Doğan Alemdar (to (France) Stade Rennes)
—	DF	AUS	Aziz Behich (loan return to İstanbul Başakşehir, later sold to Giresunspor)
—	DF	ROU	Cristian Săpunaru (to (Romania) Rapid București)
—	MF	SWE	Besard Šabović (to (Russia) Khimki)
—	FW	ROU	Denis Alibec (on loan to (Romania) CFR Cluj)
—	FW	FRA	Wilfried Kanga (to (Switzerland) Young Boys)

=== Konyaspor ===
In:

No.	Pos.	Nation	Player
77	MF	POL	Konrad Michalak (on loan from (Russia) Akhmat Grozny, previously on loan to Çaykur Rizespor)

Out:

No.	Pos.	Nation	Player
—	MF	TUR	Oğuz Kağan Güçtekin (loan return to Fenerbahçe, later sold to (Belgium) Westerlo)
—	MF	BIH	Deni Milošević (to Antalyaspor)
—	MF	NGR	Jesse Sekidika (loan return to Galatasaray, later loaned to (Belgium) OH Leuven)
—	FW	MKD	Erdon Daci (to (Belgium) Westerlo)

=== Sivasspor ===
In:

No.	Pos.	Nation	Player
21	DF	TUR	Koray Altınay (from Fatih Karagümrük)

Out:

No.	Pos.	Nation	Player
—	DF	GER	Robin Yalçın (to (Germany) Paderborn 07)
—	MF	BRA	Claudemir (to (Portugal) Vizela)
—	MF	UKR	Serhiy Rybalka (to (Ukraine) Oleksandriya)

=== Trabzonspor ===
In:

No.	Pos.	Nation	Player
6	MF	GRE	Manolis Siopis (from Alanyaspor)
8	MF	TUR	Dorukhan Toköz (from Beşiktaş)
14	FW	DEN	Andreas Cornelius (from (Italy) Parma)
17	MF	SVK	Marek Hamšík (from (Sweden) Göteborg)
19	FW	GUI	Bengali-Fodé Koita (from Kasımpaşa)
23	DF	TUR	İsmail Köybaşı (from Çaykur Rizespor)
24	DF	NED	Stefano Denswil (on loan from (Italy) Bologna, previously on loan at (Belgium) Club Brugge)
27	FW	CIV	Gervinho (from (Italy) Parma)
33	DF	BRA	Bruno Peres (from (Italy) Roma)

Out:

No.	Pos.	Nation	Player
5	DF	IRI	Majid Hosseini (to Kayserispor)
18	FW	GHA	Caleb Ekuban (to (Italy) Genoa)
22	DF	ARG	Gastón Campi (to (Portugal) Arouca, previously on loan at Fatih Karagümrük)
23	DF	TUR	Kamil Çörekçi (to Hatayspor)
38	MF	TUR	Ahmet Canbaz (to BB Erzurumspor, previously on loan at Ümraniyespor)
—	MF	MLI	Fousseni Diabaté (on loan to Giresunspor, previously on loan at Göztepe)
—	MF	BRA	Flávio (on loan to Giresunspor)

=== Yeni Malatyaspor ===
In:

No.	Pos.	Nation	Player
4	MF	SCO	Stevie Mallan (from (Scotland) Hibernian, previously on loan)
11	MF	GAB	Didier Ndong (on loan from (France) Dijon)
16	DF	TUR	Sadık Çiftpınar (from Fenerbahçe)

Out:

No.	Pos.	Nation	Player
17	DF	ZIM	Teenage Hadebe (to (United States) Houston Dynamo)
20	MF	TUR	Ahmed Ildiz (to Alanyaspor)
