= List of Antalyaspor seasons =

Antalyaspor is a Turkish professional football club located in the city of Antalya. The club colours are red and white and they play their home matches at Antalya Arena. Domestically, the club has won the First League twice, in 1982 and 1986. They also finished as runners-up for the Turkish Cup in 2000.

== Past seasons ==
| Season (Note: Only Domestic results) | League | Place | Turkish Cup |
|---|---|---|---|
| 1966–67 | TFF First League | 11 | Qualifying round |
| 1967–68 | TFF First League | 4 | – |
| 1968–69 | TFF First League | 5 | Qualifying round |
| 1969–70 | TFF First League | 6 | – |
| 1970–71 | TFF First League | 9 | – |
| 1971–72 | TFF First League | 8 | – |
| 1972–73 | TFF First League | 9 | – |
| 1973–74 | TFF First League | 7 | – |
| 1974–75 | TFF First League | 10 | – |
| 1975–76 | TFF First League | 11 | Qualifying round |
| 1976–77 | TFF First League | 5 | Qualifying round |
| 1977–78 | TFF First League | 8 | Qualifying round |
| 1978–79 | TFF First League | 3 | Qualifying round |
| 1979–80 | TFF First League | 3 | Qualifying round |
| 1980–81 | TFF First League | 8 | Qualifying round |
| 1981–82 | TFF First League | 1 | Qualifying round |
| 1982–83 | Süper Lig | 14 | Qualifying round |
| 1983–84 | Süper Lig | 15 | Qualifying round |
| 1984–85 | Süper Lig | 17 | Qualifying round |
| 1985–86 | TFF First League | 1 | Qualifying round |
| 1986–87 | Süper Lig | 18 | Qualifying round |
| 1987–88 | TFF First League | 2 | Qualifying round |
| 1988–89 | TFF First League | 4 | Qualifying round |
| 1989–90 | TFF First League | 3 | Qualifying round |
| 1990–91 | TFF First League | 14 | Qualifying round |
| 1991–92 | TFF First League | 2 | Qualifying round |
| 1992–93 | TFF First League | 6 | Qualifying round |
| 1993–94 | TFF First League | 6 | Qualifying round |
| 1994–95 | Süper Lig | 13 | Qualifying round |
| 1995–96 | Süper Lig | 7 | Qualifying round |
| 1996–97 | Süper Lig | 10 | Qualifying round |
| 1997–98 | Süper Lig | 12 | Qualifying round |
| 1998–99 | Süper Lig | 6 | Qualifying round |
| 1999–00 | Süper Lig | 11 | Runners-up |
| 2000–01 | Süper Lig | 15 | Qualifying round |
| 2001–02 | Süper Lig | 17 | Qualifying round |
| 2002–03 | TFF First League | 11 | Qualifying round |
| 2003–04 | TFF First League | 7 | Qualifying round |
| 2004–05 | TFF First League | 14 | Qualifying round |
| 2005–06 | TFF First League | 2 | Qualifying round |
| 2006–07 | Süper Lig | 16 | Qualifying round |
| 2007–08 | TFF First League | 2 | Qualifying round |
| 2008–09 | Süper Lig | 12 | Quarter-finals |
| 2009–10 | Süper Lig | 9 | Semi-finals |
| 2010–11 | Süper Lig | 11 | Group stage |
| 2011–12 | Süper Lig | 15 | Quarter-finals |
| 2012–13 | Süper Lig | 7 | Group stage |
| 2013–14 | Süper Lig | 17 | Semi-finals |
| 2014–15 | TFF First League | 5 | Second round |
| 2015–16 | Süper Lig | 9 | Round of 16 |
| 2016–17 | Süper Lig | 5 | Third round |
| 2017–18 | Süper Lig | 14 | Round of 16 |
| 2018–19 | Süper Lig | 7 | Round of 16 |
| 2019–20 | Süper Lig | 9 | Semi-finals |
| 2020–21 | Süper Lig | 16 | Runners-up |
| 2021–22 | Süper Lig | 7 | Quarter-finals |
| 2022–23 | Süper Lig | 13 | Round of 16 |
| 2023–24 | Süper Lig | 10 | Round of 16 |
| 2024–25 | Süper Lig | 15 | Group stage |

=== League affiliation ===
- Süper Lig: 1982–85, 1986–87, 1994–02, 2006–07, 2008–14, 2015–
- TFF First League: 1966–82, 1985–86, 1987–94, 2002–06, 2007–08, 2014–15
