= Adam Buksa =

Polish footballer (born 1996)

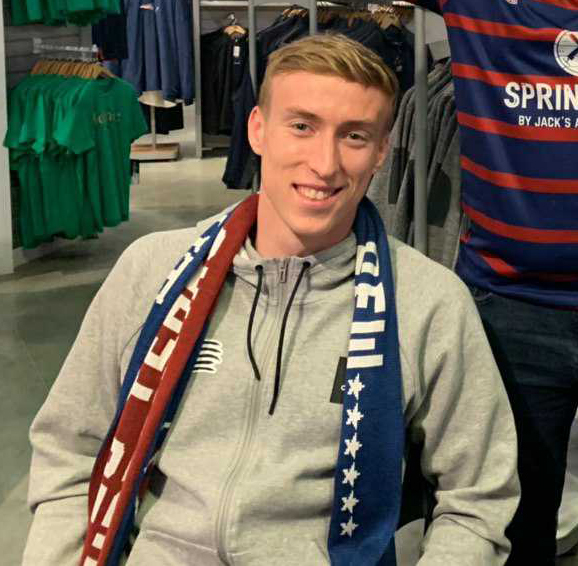
- Buksa in 2020 with New England Revolution

Personal information
- Date of birth: 12 July 1996 (age 30)
- Place of birth: Kraków, Poland
- Height: 1.93 m (6 ft 4 in)
- Position: Striker

Team information
- Current team: Mallorca (on loan from Udinese)
- Number: 16

Youth career
- Wisła Kraków
- –2010: Hutnik Kraków
- 2010–2013: Garbarnia Kraków
- 2013: Wisła Kraków
- 2013–2014: Novara

Senior career*
Years	Team	Apps	(Gls)
2014–2016	Lechia Gdańsk	16	(1)
2014–2016	Lechia Gdańsk II	10	(3)
2016–2018	Zagłębie Lubin	30	(5)
2016–2017	Zagłębie Lubin II	6	(5)
2017–2018	→ Pogoń Szczecin (loan)	12	(4)
2018–2020	Pogoń Szczecin	40	(18)
2020–2022	New England Revolution	64	(29)
2022–2024	Lens	8	(0)
2022–2023	Lens II	1	(1)
2023–2024	→ Antalyaspor (loan)	33	(16)
2024–2025	Midtjylland	27	(13)
2025–	Udinese	25	(3)
2026–	→ Mallorca (loan)	7	(1)

International career^{‡}
2013	Poland U17	2	(0)
2013–2014	Poland U18	11	(2)
2014–2015	Poland U19	9	(4)
2016–2019	Poland U21	12	(2)
2021–	Poland	25	(7)
- * Club domestic league appearances and goals as of 17 October 2026 ‡ National team caps and goals as of 11:45, 15 November 2025 (UTC)

Adam Buksa (born 12 July 1996) is a Polish professional footballer who plays as a centre forward for Segunda División club Mallorca, on loan from Serie A club Udinese. He is Aleksander Buksa's older brother.

== Club career ==
=== Clubs in Poland ===
Adam Buksa is a product of the club's youth system of Wisła Kraków, but started his professional career in Lechia Gdańsk and made his debut on 25 July 2014 against Podbeskidzie Bielsko-Biała. He played for Lechia for two seasons and moved to Zagłębie Lubin after the 2015–16 season.

In Zagłębie, Buksa played until January 2018 and was loaned out to Pogoń Szczecin for the remainder of the 2017–18 season. After the season, Buksa signed a contract with Pogoń and established himself as one of Poland's most promising young strikers. In December 2019, he signed a contract for three years with New England Revolution from Major League Soccer.

=== New England Revolution ===
Buksa signed for the New England Revolution on 12 December 2019. His reported transfer fee of $4.5 million made him the second-most expensive signing in the club's history behind Gustavo Bou. He became the third Polish-born player to represent the Revolution, joining Rob Jachym (1997–98) and Janusz Michallik (1998). Buksa made his first appearance in the season opener for the team, a 2–1 loss to Montreal Impact on 29 February 2020. He scored his first goal for the Revolution in the 28th minute of the club's home opener against the Chicago Fire on 7 March 2020, assisted by Brandon Bye. It was the first goal a first-year Revolution player scored in a home opener since Saër Sène in 2012 against the Portland Timbers.

Buksa finished second in regular-season scoring for the Revolution in his inaugural campaign, with six goals and two assists in 23 appearances.

On 24 November 2020, in the 26th minute of the first round of the 2020 MLS Cup Playoffs, Buksa scored the game-winning goal in the Revolutions' 2–0 victory over the 1st-seeded Supporters' Shield holders, the Philadelphia Union.

Buksa scored the first goal of the Revolution's 2021 season in the club's season-opener against the Chicago Fire at Soldier Field on 17 April 2021. He would lead the Revolution to their first MLS Supporters' Shield, finishing the 2021 season as its top goal scorer. He was named MLS player of the week during match week 32. He would conclude the 2021 season tied for 5th in the league in goals scored with 16 in 31 appearances. He would score the club's opening goal in the 2021 MLS Playoffs against eventual-champion NYCFC. Buksa's penalty would later be saved by Sean Johnson as the Revolution ultimately fell 3-2 in penalties following a 2–2 draw in open play.

Buksa started the 2022 season strongly, scoring 7 goals in his first 10 matches for the club. His start to the season included a 7 game scoring streak, which tied a team record set by Wolde Harris in 2000. On 29 May 2022, Seth Macomber of The Bent Musket reported that Buksa, who had missed the Revolution's past two matches and had been released to Poland for national team duty, was close to joining Lens on a permanent deal. On 6 June 2022, The Boston Globe's Frank Dell'Apa reported that the Revolution had indeed agreed to transfer Buksa to Lens in return for a transfer fee of $10 million, believed to be a record fee paid for a player by the French club. Buksa finished his Revolution career 11th on the all-time list of goal scorers for the club, with 35 goals in 73 games.

=== Lens ===
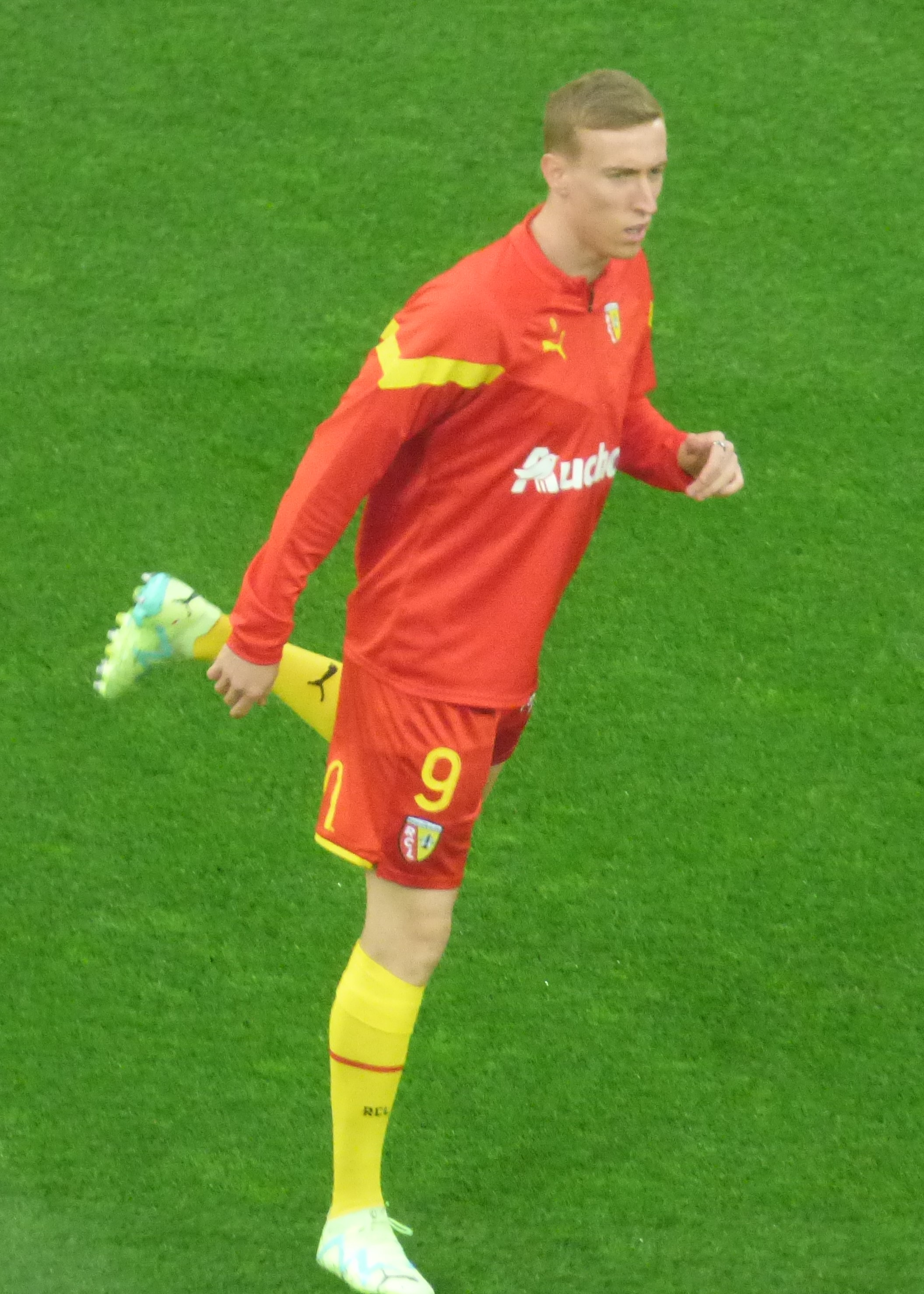
Buksa with Lens in 2023 during warming up.

On 7 June 2022, the New England Revolution announced that Buksa would be leaving the club and transferring to Ligue 1 club Lens for a reported transfer fee of $10 million. He joined Lens on 10 July 2022. He made his first appearance in Ligue 1 on 9 September 2022 against Troyes.

==== Loan to Antalyaspor ====
On 18 July 2023, Buksa was sent on a season-long loan, with an option to buy, to Turkish club Antalyaspor, joining his compatriot Jakub Kałuziński. He ended the season with 16 goals in 33 Süper Lig appearances, and was Antalyaspor's top goalscorer in all competitions across the 2023–24 campaign. On 25 May 2024, a day after playing his final game for the club, Buksa announced on Instagram that he would leave Antalyaspor upon the expiry of his loan.

=== Midtjylland ===
On 11 July 2024, Buksa moved to Danish defending champions Midtjylland on a four-year deal, for a reported fee of €4.5 million. He scored on his debut, in a 1–1 league draw against Aarhus on 19 July.

=== Udinese ===
On 26 August 2025, Buksa joined Serie A club Udinese on a four-year contract, for a fee estimated to be approximately €5 million.

==== Loan to Mallorca ====
On 23 August 2026, Buksa joined LaLiga side Mallorca on loan with an option to buy.

== International career ==
Buksa received his first call-up to the Poland national team by then-manager Jerzy Brzęczek in a friendly match against the Czech Republic on 15 November 2018, but was unused in Poland's 1–0 defeat. He was also an unused substitute in Poland's 1–1 away draw against Portugal in the 2018–19 UEFA Nations League A, where Poland finished bottom but was later spared from relegation due to UEFA's format revision.

After a three-year hiatus, Buksa finally started on his debut against Albania in the 2022 FIFA World Cup qualification on 2 September 2021, contributing one goal in the match where Poland also achieved a 4–1 home victory. The same year, on 6 September, in his second match with the national team, he completed his first-ever hat-trick as Poland went on to win against San Marino 7–1.

Buksa was selected for his first international tournament on 7 June 2024, making Poland's final squad for UEFA Euro 2024 in Germany. In Poland's opening match of the tournament against the Netherlands on 16 June, he scored off a corner kick in the 16th minute to give Poland an early lead, before they fell to goals from Cody Gakpo and Wout Weghorst, losing the game 1–2.

== Career statistics ==
=== Club ===
As of match played 17 October 2026

Appearances and goals by club, season and competition
Club	Season	League			National cup (Note: Includes Polish Cup, U.S. Open Cup, Turkish Cup, Danish Cup)		Continental		Other		Total	
Club	Season	Division	Apps	Goals	Apps	Goals	Apps	Goals	Apps	Goals	Apps	Goals
Lechia Gdańsk	2014–15	Ekstraklasa	8	0	0	0	—		—		8	0
Lechia Gdańsk	2015–16	Ekstraklasa	8	1	1	0	—		—		9	1
Lechia Gdańsk	Total		16	1	1	0	—		—		17	1
Zagłębie Lubin	2016–17	Ekstraklasa	22	4	0	0	—		—		22	4
Zagłębie Lubin	2017–18	Ekstraklasa	8	1	1	0	—		—		9	1
Zagłębie Lubin	Total		30	5	1	0	—		—		31	5
Pogoń Szczecin (loan)	2017–18	Ekstraklasa	12	4	0	0	—		—		12	4
Pogoń Szczecin	2018–19	Ekstraklasa	22	11	1	0	—		—		23	11
Pogoń Szczecin	2019–20	Ekstraklasa	18	7	2	0	—		—		20	7
Pogoń Szczecin	Total		40	18	3	0	—		—		43	18
New England Revolution	2020	MLS	23	6	—		—		5 (Note: One appearance in MLS is Back Tournament, four appearances and one goal in MLS Cup Playoffs)	1	28	7
New England Revolution	2021	MLS	31	16	—		—		1 (Note: Appearance in MLS Cup Playoffs)	1	32	17
New England Revolution	2022	MLS	10	7	1	2	2 (Note: Appearances in CONCACAF Champions League)	2	0	0	13	11
New England Revolution	Total		64	29	1	2	2	2	6	2	73	35
Lens	2022–23	Ligue 1	8	0	0	0	—		—		8	0
Antalyaspor (loan)	2023–24	Süper Lig	33	16	2	0	—		—		35	16
Midtjylland	2024–25	Danish Superliga	24	12	1	0	14 (Note: Six appearances and one goal in UEFA Champions League, eight appearances and two goals in UEFA Europa League)	3	0	0	39	15
Midtjylland	2025–26	Danish Superliga	3	1	—		3 (Note: Appearances in UEFA Europa League)	1	—		6	2
Midtjylland	Total		27	13	1	0	17	4	0	0	45	17
Udinese	2025–26	Serie A	25	3	2	0	—		—		27	3
Mallorca (loan)	2026–27	Segunda División	7	1	0	0	—		—		7	1
Career total			263	90	11	2	19	6	6	2	299	100

=== International ===
As of match played 14 November 2025

Appearances and goals by national team and year
National team	Year	Apps	Goals
Poland
Poland	2021	5	5
Poland	2022	4	0
Poland	2023	4	1
Poland	2024	7	1
Poland	2025	5	0
Total		25	7

Scores and results list Poland's goal tally first, score column indicates score after each Buksa goal.

List of international goals scored by Adam Buksa
No.	Date	Venue	Opponent	Score	Result	Competition
1	2 September 2021	Stadion Narodowy, Warsaw, Poland	Albania	2–1	4–1	2022 FIFA World Cup qualification
2	5 September 2021	San Marino Stadium, Serravalle, San Marino	San Marino	5–1	7–1	2022 FIFA World Cup qualification
3	5 September 2021	San Marino Stadium, Serravalle, San Marino	San Marino	6–1	7–1	2022 FIFA World Cup qualification
4	5 September 2021	San Marino Stadium, Serravalle, San Marino	San Marino	7–1	7–1	2022 FIFA World Cup qualification
5	9 October 2021	Stadion Narodowy, Warsaw, Poland	San Marino	4–0	5–0	2022 FIFA World Cup qualification
6	12 October 2023	Tórsvøllur, Tórshavn, Faroe Islands	Faroe Islands	2–0	2–0	UEFA Euro 2024 qualifying
7	16 June 2024	Volksparkstadion, Hamburg, Germany	Netherlands	1–0	1–2	UEFA Euro 2024

== Honours ==
Zagłębie Lubin II

- IV liga Lower Silesia West: 2016–17

New England Revolution

- Supporters' Shield: 2021

Individual

- 2021 New England Revolution golden boot winner (16 goals)
