= Naldo (footballer, born 1988) =

Brazilian footballer

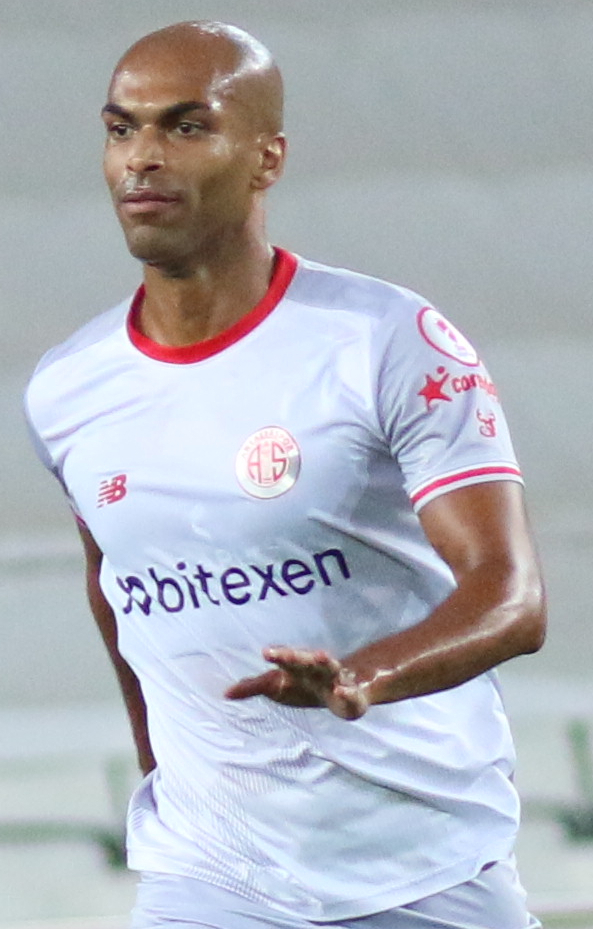
- Naldo playing for Antalyaspor in 2021

Personal information
- Full name: Edinaldo Gomes Pereira
- Date of birth: 28 August 1988 (age 38)
- Place of birth: Santo André, Brazil
- Height: 1.88 m (6 ft 2 in)
- Position: Centre-back

Youth career
- União Barbarense
- ECUS

Senior career*
Years	Team	Apps	(Gls)
2007	ECUS	24	(1)
2008	Cascavel		
2009	Oeste Paulista	8	(0)
2009	Lemense	23	(1)
2010–2012	União São João	21	(2)
2010	→ Ponte Preta (loan)	34	(2)
2011	→ Cruzeiro (loan)	22	(0)
2012	→ Grêmio (loan)	24	(3)
2013	Granada	0	(0)
2013	→ Bologna (loan)	5	(0)
2013–2015	Udinese	16	(0)
2014–2015	→ Getafe (loan)	30	(0)
2015–2016	Sporting CP	18	(0)
2016–2017	Krasnodar	14	(2)
2017–2020	Espanyol	45	(1)
2020–2022	Antalyaspor	65	(6)
2022–2023	Al-Taawoun	26	(1)
2023–2024	Antalyaspor	11	(0)
2024–2025	Racing Ferrol	32	(0)
2025–2026	Leixões	16	(0)
- * Club domestic league appearances and goals as of 17 May 2026

Edinaldo Gomes Pereira (born 28 August 1988), known as Naldo, is a Brazilian professional footballer who plays as a central defender.

== Career ==
Born in Santo André, São Paulo, Naldo played for Cascavel CR, Oeste Paulista EC and CA Lemense before moving to União São João EC for the 2010 season, with his rights being owned by Traffic Group. In April 2010 he moved to Série B's AA Ponte Preta.

Naldo made his professional debut on 7 May 2010, coming on as a late substitute in a 1–1 away draw against ASA de Arapiraca. He scored his first goal on 3 September, netting the last in a 3–1 win at América Mineiro.

On 29 December 2010, Naldo moved to Cruzeiro EC, in Série A. After featuring regularly for the club he moved to fellow league team Grêmio FBPA on 9 January 2012.

On 29 January 2013, Naldo signed a five-year deal with Granada CF, being immediately loaned to Serie A's Bologna F.C. 1909. He made his debut in the competition on 10 March, playing the entire second half in a 1–0 away win against Inter Milan.

In May 2013, after making five appearances for Bologna, Naldo was assigned to Granada's partner club Udinese Calcio. A backup to countryman Danilo and Thomas Heurtaux, he appeared in 16 matches during the campaign.

On 1 September 2014, Naldo was loaned to La Liga side Getafe CF, in a season-long deal. He made his debut in the competition on the 14th, starting in a 2–0 away loss against Sevilla FC.

On 18 July 2015, Naldo signed for Portuguese side Sporting CP, but moved to Russian club FC Krasnodar on 26 August of the following year. On 10 August 2017, Krasnodar confirmed his transfer to RCD Espanyol.

On 25 July 2022, after two years at Turkish side Antalyaspor, Naldo joined Saudi Arabian club Al-Taawoun on a free transfer. On 18 August of the following year, he returned to Antalyaspor for one year with an option for a second year.

On 26 July 2024, Naldo returned to Spain after four years, signing for Segunda División side Racing de Ferrol.

== Career statistics ==
As of match played 5 November 2024

Appearances and goals by club, season, and competition
Club	Season	League			State League (Note: Appearances in Campeonato Gaúcho and Campeonato Mineiro)		National Cup (Note: Appearances in Copa do Brasil, Copa del Rey, Taça de Portugal, Russian Cup, Turkish Cup and King's Cup)		League Cup (Note: Appearances in Taça da Liga)		Continental (Note: Appearances in Copa Sudamericana UEFA Europa League and UEFA Champions League)		Other (Note: Appearances in Supertaça Portugal and Supercopa de Catalunya)		Total	
Club	Season	Division	Apps	Goals	Apps	Goals	Apps	Goals	Apps	Goals	Apps	Goals	Apps	Goals	Apps	Goals
União São João	2010	Paulista Série A2	21	2	—		0	0	—		—		—		21	2
Ponte Preta (loan)	2010	Série B	34	2	—		0	0	—		—		—		34	2
Cruzeiro (loan)	2011	Série A	21	0	1	0	0	0	—		—		—		22	0
Grêmio (loan)	2012	Série A	16	0	8	3	6	1	—		4	0	—		34	4
Bologna (loan)	2012–13	Serie A	5	0	—		0	0	—		—		—		5	0
Udinese	2013–14	Serie A	16	0	—		0	0	—		1	0	—		17	0
Getafe (loan)	2014–15	La Liga	30	0	—		2	0	—		—		—		32	0
Sporting	2015–16	Primeira Liga	18	0	—		1	0	1	0	6	0	1	0	27	0
Krasnodar	2016–17	Russian Premier League	14	2	—		1	0	—		9	0	—		24	2
Espanyol	2017–18	La Liga	11	0	—		6	0	—		—		1	0	18	0
Espanyol	2018–19	La Liga	16	1	—		2	0	—		—		—		18	1
Espanyol	2019–20	La Liga	18	0	—		1	0	—		—		—		19	0
Espanyol	Total		45	1	—		9	0	—		—		1	0	55	1
Antalyaspor	2020–21	Turkish Süper Lig	29	2	—		5	0	—		—		—		34	2
Antalyaspor	2021–22	Turkish Süper Lig	36	4	—		3	1	—		—		—		39	5
Antalyaspor	Total		65	6	—		8	1	—		—		—		73	7
Al-Taawoun	2022–23	Saudi Pro League	26	1	—		1	0	—		—		—		27	1
Antalyaspor	2023–24	Turkish Süper Lig	11	0	—		2	0	—		—		—		13	0
Racing de Ferrol	2024–25	Spanish Segunda División	12	0	—		0	0	—		—		—		12	0
Total			334	14	9	3	30	2	1	0	20	0	2	0	396	19

== Honours ==
Sporting CP

- Supertaça Cândido de Oliveira: 2015
