= Alassane Ndao =

Senegalese footballer

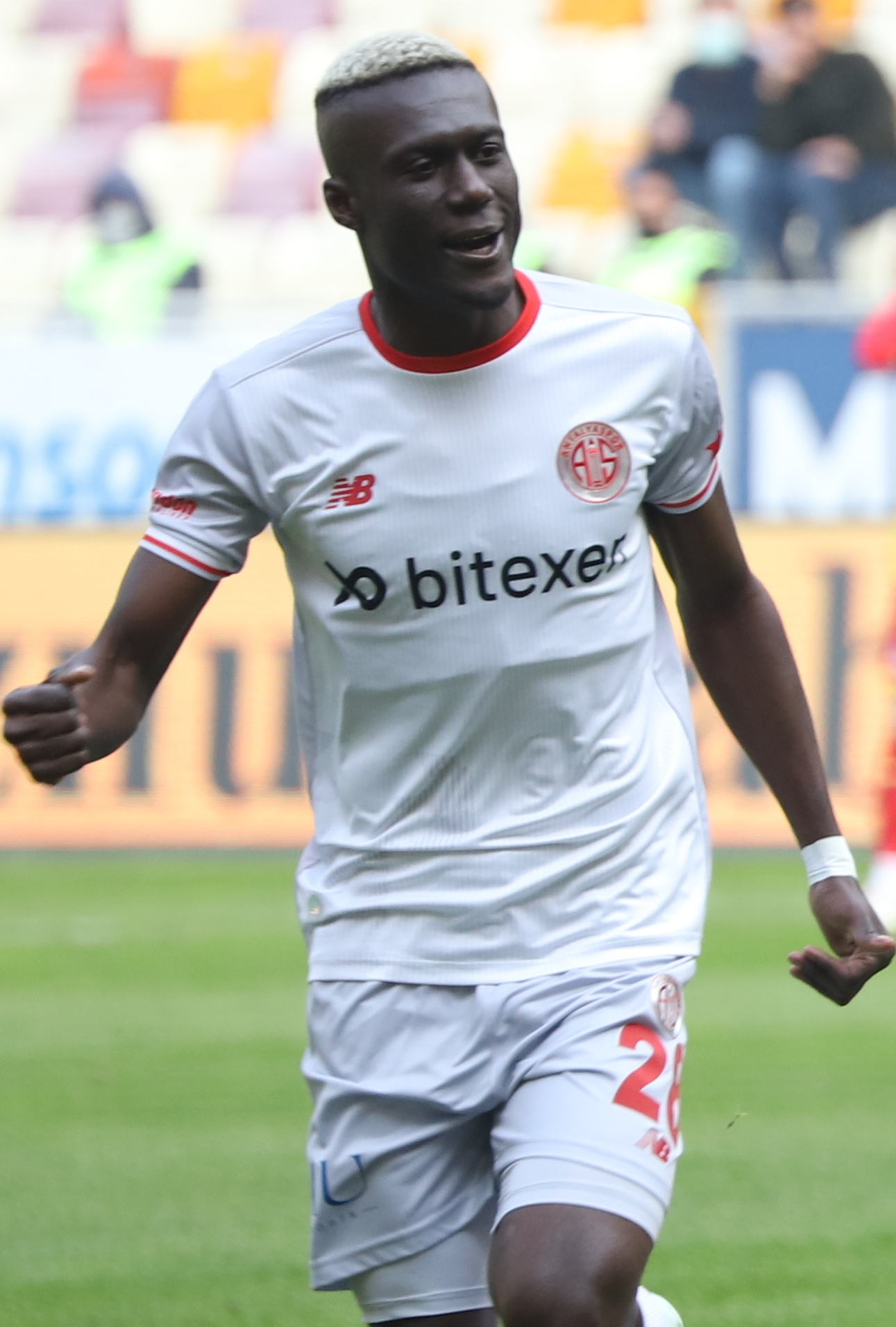
- Ndao with Antalyaspor in 2022

Personal information
- Date of birth: 31 December 1996 (age 29)
- Place of birth: Dakar, Senegal
- Height: 1.83 m (6 ft 0 in)
- Position: Winger

Senior career*
Years	Team	Apps	(Gls)
2016–2020	Dakar Sacré-Cœur		
2020–2021	Fatih Karagümrük	57	(14)
2021–2023	Al-Ahli	13	(1)
2022–2023	→ Antalyaspor (loan)	38	(4)
2023–2024	İstanbulspor	21	(1)
2024–2025	Konyaspor	58	(8)

International career
2017–	Senegal	3	(1)
- * Club domestic league appearances and goals as of 6 December 2025

Alassane Ndao (born 31 December 1996) is a Senegalese professional footballer who plays as a winger.

== Club career ==
=== Fatih Karagümrük ===
Ndao made his professional debut with Fatih Karagümrük in a 3-0 Süper Lig win over Yeni Malatyaspor on 12 September 2020.

=== Al-Ahli ===
On 31 July 2021, Ndao joined Saudi Arabian club Al-Ahli.

==== Antalyaspor (loan) ====
On 21 January 2022, Ndao joined Antalyaspor on a loan spell, until the end of the season.

==== İstanbulspor ====
On 11 August 2023, he signed with Süper Lig club İstanbulspor.

=== Konyaspor ===
On 13 November 2025, Ndao was banned from playing for 12 months for his involvement in the 2025 Turkish football betting scandal.

== International career ==
Ndao made his debut for Senegal on 22 July 2017 in African Nations Championship qualifier against Sierra Leone, and scored in 51st-minute.

== Career statistics ==
=== Club ===
As of match played 11 January 2022

Appearances and goals by club, season and competition
Club	Season	League			National Cup		Continental		Other		Total	
Club	Season	Division	Apps	Goals	Apps	Goals	Apps	Goals	Apps	Goals	Apps	Goals
Fatih Karagümrük	2019–20	1. Lig	19	3	0	0	–		–		19	3
Fatih Karagümrük	2020–21	Süper Lig	38	11	2	0	–		–		40	11
Fatih Karagümrük	Total		57	14	2	0	–		–		59	14
Al-Ahli	2021–22	Saudi Professional League	13	1	1	0	0	0	0	0	14	1
Antalyaspor (loan)	2021–22	Süper Lig	0	0	0	0	–		0	0	0	0
Career total			70	15	3	0	0	0	0	0	73	15

=== International ===
As of match played 23 August 2017

National team	Year	Apps	Goals
Senegal	2017	3	1
Total		3	1

As of match played 23 August 2017

List of international goals scored by Alassane Ndao
No.	Date	Venue	Cap	Opponent	Score	Result	Competition
1	22 July 2017	Stade Al Djigo, Dakar, Senegal	1	Sierra Leone	2–1	3–1	2018 African Nations Championship qualification
