= Mustafa Erdilman =

Turkish footballer

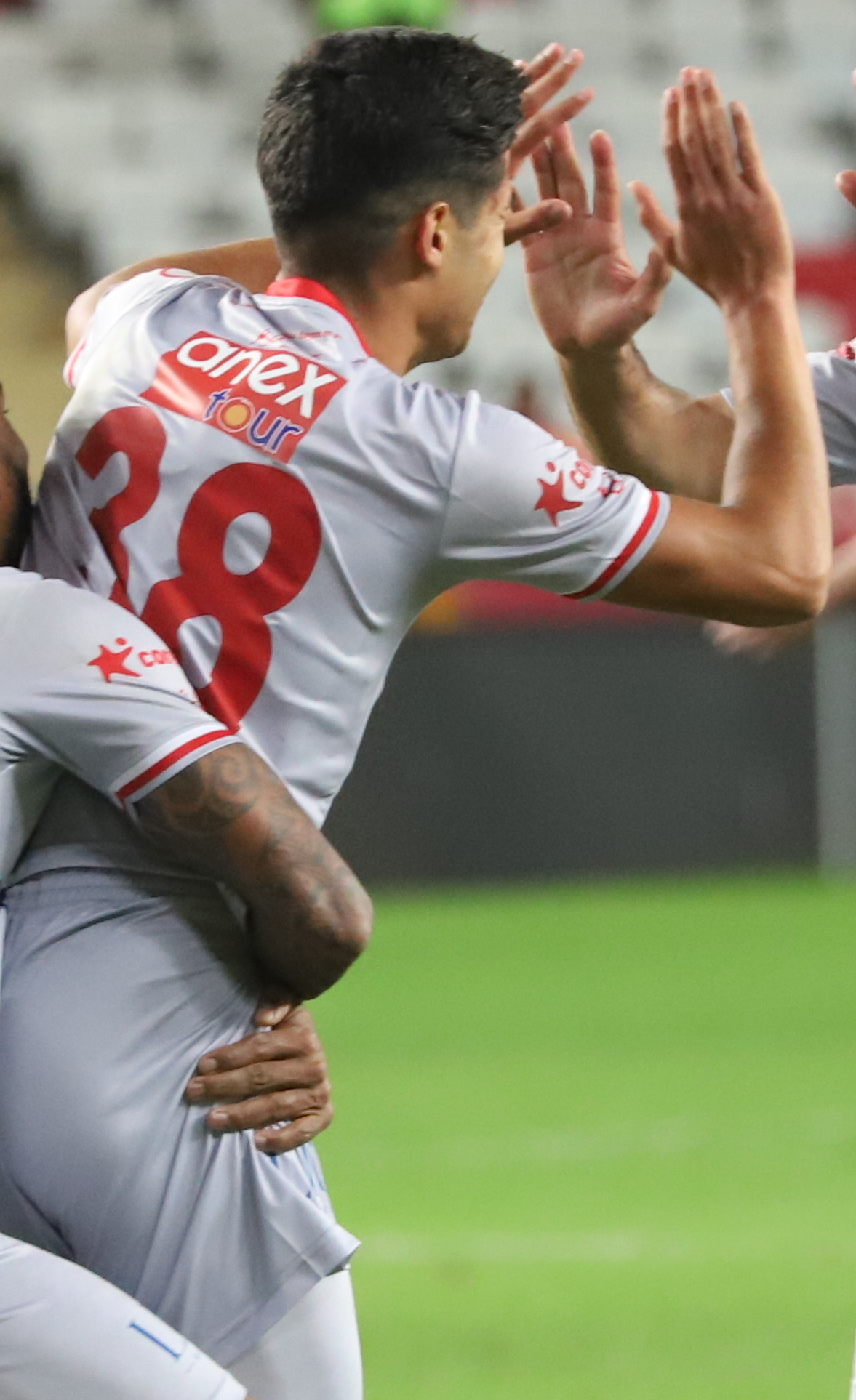
- Erdilman in 2021

Personal information
- Date of birth: 1 January 2004 (age 22)
- Place of birth: Çavdır, Turkey
- Position: Midfielder

Team information
- Current team: Bodrum
- Number: 8

Youth career
- 2014–2015: Güneyspor
- 2015–2021: Antalyaspor

Senior career*
Years	Team	Apps	(Gls)
2021–2024	Antalyaspor	6	(0)
2024–	Bodrum	26	(0)

International career^{‡}
2018	Turkey U14	4	(1)
2018–2019	Turkey U15	12	(0)
2019	Turkey U16	6	(0)
2022	Turkey U18	2	(0)
2022	Turkey U19	1	(0)
- * Club domestic league appearances and goals as of 5 May 2026 ‡ National team caps and goals as of 26 October 2022

Mustafa Erdilman (born 1 January 2004) is a Turkish professional footballer who plays as a midfielder for TFF 1. Lig club Bodrum.

== Career ==
A youth product of Güneyspor and Antalyaspor, Erdilman signed his first professional contract with the club on 15 December 2021. He made his professional debut with Antalyaspor in a 1–1 (4–2) 2021 Turkish Super Cup penalty shootout loss to Beşiktaş J.K. 5 January 2022, coming on as a late sub in the 98' minute.

== International career ==
Erdilman is a youth international for Turkey, having represented the Turkey U14s, U15s and U16s.
