= Veysel Sarı =

Turkish footballer

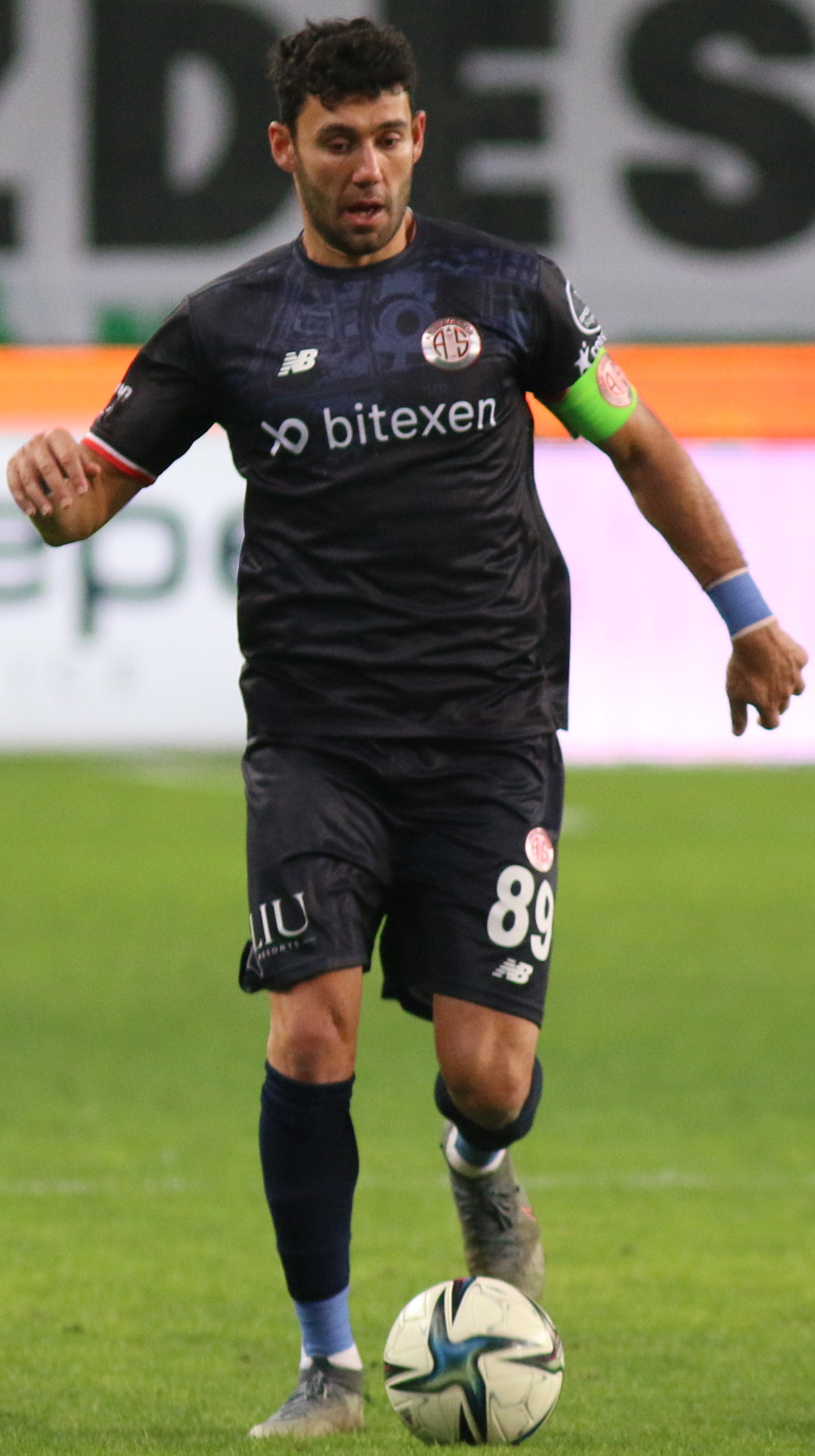
- Sarı in 2021

Personal information
- Full name: Veysel Sarı
- Date of birth: 25 July 1988 (age 38)
- Place of birth: Istanbul, Turkey
- Height: 1.84 m (6 ft 0 in)
- Position: Right back

Team information
- Current team: Antalyaspor
- Number: 89

Youth career
- 2008–2009: Beylerbeyi S.K.

Senior career*
Years	Team	Apps	(Gls)
2009–2014	Eskişehirspor	102	(9)
2014–2015	Galatasaray	14	(0)
2015–2019	Kasımpaşa	120	(9)
2020–	Antalyaspor	200	(12)

International career^{‡}
2011–2012	Turkey A2	5	(4)
2013	Turkey	2	(1)
- * Club domestic league appearances and goals as of 10 June 2026 ‡ National team caps and goals as of 24 September 2014

Veysel Sarı (born 25 July 1988) is a Turkish professional footballer who plays as a right back for Süper Lig club Antalyaspor.

== Club career ==
=== Galatasaray ===
On 4 February 2014, Veysel joined Galatasaray signing a contract which will keep him at the club until 2018. He made his debut against Tokatspor on 5 February 2014, netting a goal, in a 3–0 win for the campaign's Turkish Cup.

Veysel made his league debut on 8 February 2014 against his former team Eskişehirspor, coming in as a substitute in a 3–0 win home.

== International career ==
On 28 May 2013, Veysel was selected for the first time to full team by coach Abdullah Avci, for friendly games against Slovenia and Latvia.

== Career statistics ==
=== Club ===
As of match played 24 May 2024

Club	Season	League			Cup		Europe		Other		Total	
Club	Season	Division	Apps	Goals	Apps	Goals	Apps	Goals	Apps	Goals	Apps	Goals
Eskişehirspor	2009–10	Süper Lig	8	1	3	0	–		–		11	1
Eskişehirspor	2010–11	Süper Lig	12	1	1	0	–		–		13	1
Eskişehirspor	2011–12	Süper Lig	36	5	3	0	–		–		39	5
Eskişehirspor	2012–13	Süper Lig	31	1	10	0	4	1	–		45	2
Eskişehirspor	2013–14	Süper Lig	15	1	1	0	–		–		16	1
Eskişehirspor	Total		102	9	18	0	4	1	–		124	10
Galatasaray	2013–14	Süper Lig	9	0	2	1	–		–		11	1
Galatasaray	2014–15	Süper Lig	5	0	2	0	2	0	1	0	10	0
Galatasaray	Total		14	0	4	1	2	0	1	0	21	1
Kasımpaşa	2014–15	Süper Lig	15	1	–		–		–		15	1
Kasımpaşa	2015–16	Süper Lig	20	0	1	0	–		–		21	0
Kasımpaşa	2016–17	Süper Lig	28	2	7	0	–		–		35	2
Kasımpaşa	2017–18	Süper Lig	29	3	2	0	–		–		31	3
Kasımpaşa	2018–19	Süper Lig	28	1	7	1	–		–		35	2
Kasımpaşa	2019–20	Süper Lig	13	2	3	0	–		–		16	2
Kasımpaşa	Total		133	9	20	1	–		–		153	10
Antalyaspor	2019–20	Süper Lig	15	1	3	0	–		–		18	1
Antalyaspor	2020–21	Süper Lig	30	4	3	0	–		–		33	4
Antalyaspor	2021–22	Süper Lig	35	2	2	0	–		1	0	38	2
Antalyaspor	2022–23	Süper Lig	31	2	1	0	–		–		32	2
Antalyaspor	2022–23	Süper Lig	35	1	2	0	–		–		37	1
Antalyaspor	Total		146	10	11	0	–		1	0	158	10
Career total			395	28	53	2	6	1	2	0	456	31

== International goals ==
Scores and results table. Turkey's goal tally first:

#	Date	Venue	Opponent	Score	Result	Competition
1.	28 May 2013	MSV-Arena, Duisburg, Germany	Latvia	3–1	3–3	Friendly

== Honours ==
Galatasaray

- Türkiye Kupası: 2013–14
