= Sherel Floranus =

Dutch-Curaçaoan footballer (born 1998)

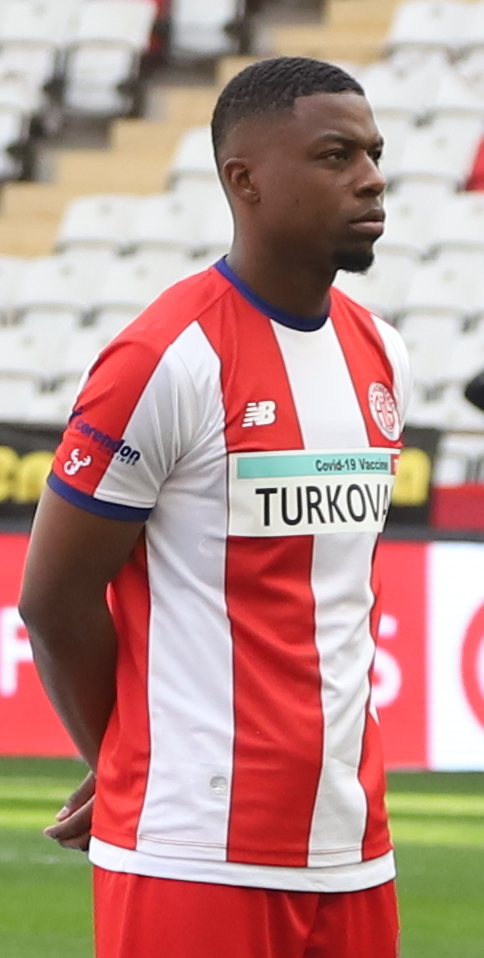
- Floranus in 2022

Personal information
- Full name: Sherel Constancio Floranus
- Date of birth: 23 August 1998 (age 28)
- Place of birth: Rotterdam, Netherlands
- Height: 1.85 m (6 ft 1 in)
- Position: Right back

Team information
- Current team: PEC Zwolle
- Number: 2

Youth career
- –2015: Sparta Rotterdam

Senior career*
Years	Team	Apps	(Gls)
2015–2018	Sparta	61	(0)
2016	Jong Sparta	2	(0)
2018–2021	Heerenveen	71	(2)
2021–2023	Antalyaspor	30	(1)
2023–2024	Almere City	31	(0)
2024–	PEC Zwolle	58	(1)

International career^{‡}
2014	Netherlands U16	6	(0)
2014–2015	Netherlands U17	11	(1)
2015	Netherlands U18	2	(0)
2016–2017	Netherlands U19	10	(0)
2018–2020	Netherlands U21	7	(0)
2023–	Curaçao	35	(0)
- * Club domestic league appearances and goals as of 19 September 2026 ‡ National team caps and goals as of 4 October 2026

Sherel Constancio Floranus (born 23 August 1998) is a professional footballer who plays as a right-back for Eredivisie club PEC Zwolle. Born in the Netherlands, he plays for the Curaçao national team.

== Club career ==
Floranus is a youth exponent from Sparta Rotterdam. He made his team debut on 21 August 2015 against FC Eindhoven starting in the first eleven and was replaced after 81 minutes by future Dutch international player Denzel Dumfries.

On 1 August 2023, Floranus signed a two-year contract with Almere City, freshly promoted to Eredivisie.

On 26 August 2024, Floranus moved to PEC Zwolle on a three-season deal.

== International career ==
Born in the Netherlands, Floranus is of Curaçaoan descent. He is a youth international for the Netherlands and played 7 games for the Netherlands national under-21 football team and 10 for the U19s.

In June 2021 He was called up to Curaçao's preliminary squad for the 2021 CONCACAF Gold Cup.

On 18 May 2026, he was named by head coach Dick Advocaat in the 26-man squad for the 2026 FIFA World Cup, marking the country's first-ever appearance at the tournament.

== Career statistics ==
=== Club ===
As of match played 19 September 2026

Appearances and goals by club, season and competition
Club	Season	League			Cup		Other		Total	
Club	Season	Division	Apps	Goals	Apps	Goals	Apps	Goals	Apps	Goals
Sparta Rotterdam	2015–16	Eerste Divisie	12	0	1	0	—		13	0
Sparta Rotterdam	2016–17	Eredivisie	25	0	5	0	—		30	0
Sparta Rotterdam	2017–18	Eredivisie	24	0	0	0	4 (Note: Appearances in relegation play-offs)	0	28	0
Sparta Rotterdam	Total		61	0	5	0	4	0	71	0
Jong Sparta	2016–17	Tweede Divisie	2	0	—		—		2	0
SC Heerenveen	2018–19	Eredivisie	17	0	4	0	—		21	0
SC Heerenveen	2019–20	Eredivisie	25	1	4	0	—		29	1
SC Heerenveen	2020–21	Eredivisie	29	1	3	0	—		32	1
SC Heerenveen	Total		71	2	11	0	—		82	2
Antalyaspor	2021–22	Süper Lig	18	1	3	0	1 (Note: Appearance in Turkish Super Cup)	0	22	1
Antalyaspor	2022–23	Süper Lig	12	0	3	0	—		15	0
Antalyaspor	Total		30	1	6	0	1	0	37	1
Almere City	2023–24	Eredivisie	29	0	2	0	—		31	0
Almere City	2024–25	Eredivisie	2	0	0	0	—		2	0
Almere City	Total		31	0	2	0	—		33	0
PEC Zwolle	2024–25	Eredivisie	22	0	1	0	—		23	0
PEC Zwolle	2025–26	Eredivisie	32	1	2	0	—		34	1
PEC Zwolle	2026–27	Eredivisie	4	0	0	0	—		4	0
PEC Zwolle	Total		58	1	3	0	—		61	1
Career total			253	3	28	0	5	0	286	4

=== International ===
As of match played 4 October 2026

Appearances and goals by national team and year
National team	Year	Apps	Goals
Curaçao	2023	6	0
Curaçao	2024	7	0
Curaçao	2025	11	0
Curaçao	2026	11	0
Total		35	0

== Honours ==
Sparta Rotterdam

- Eerste Divisie: 2015–16
