= Doğukan Nelik =

Turkish footballer (born 2000)

Personal information
- Date of birth: 5 December 2000 (age 25)
- Place of birth: Manisa, Turkey
- Height: 1.82 m (6 ft 0 in)
- Position: Centre-back

Team information
- Current team: Aliağa FK
- Number: 23

Senior career*
| Years | Team | Apps | (Gls) |
| 2018–2021 | Akhisarspor | 24 | (1) |
| 2021–2023 | Antalyaspor | 0 | (0) |
| 2022–2023 | → Nazilli Belediyespor (loan) | 24 | (1) |
| 2023– | Aliağa FK | 3 | (0) |
- * Club domestic league appearances and goals as of 23 September 2023

Doğukan Nelik (born 5 December 2000) is a Turkish professional footballer who plays as a centre-back for TFF Third League club Aliağa FK.

== Career ==
Nelik is a youth product of Akhisarspor, and made his professional debut with them in a 0–0 Süper Lig tie with Konyaspor on 25 May 2019.

In June 2021, Nelik signed a five-year contract with Antalyaspor, but shortly after ruptured his anterior cruciate ligament during practice, keeping him away from the pitch for 6–8 months. He was sent on a one-season loan to third-tier TFF Second League club Nazilli Belediyespor in August 2022.
