= Berat Onur Pınar =

Turkish footballer

Personal information
- Date of birth: 12 June 2002 (age 24)
- Place of birth: Adapazarı, Turkey
- Position: Left-back

Team information
- Current team: Antalyaspor

Youth career
- 2015–2020: Akhisarspor

Senior career*
Years	Team	Apps	(Gls)
2020–2021	Akhisarspor	9	(0)
2021–	Antalyaspor	0	(0)
2022–2023	→ Sakaryaspor (loan)	0	(0)
- * Club domestic league appearances and goals as of 17 December 2022

Berat Onur Pınar (born 12 June 2002) is a Turkish professional footballer who plays as a left-back for the Turkish club Antalyaspor.

== Professional career ==
A youth product of Akhisarspor, Pınar began his senior career with them on 21 October 2020 in the TFF First League. He transferred to the Süper Lig club Antalyaspor on 21 September 2021, signing a 3+2 year contract. He made his professional debut with Antalyaspor in a 2–0 Turkish Cup win over Hatayspor on 9 February 2022.
