= Antalya Stadium =

Multi-purpose stadium in Antalya, Turkey

- Corendon Airlines Park
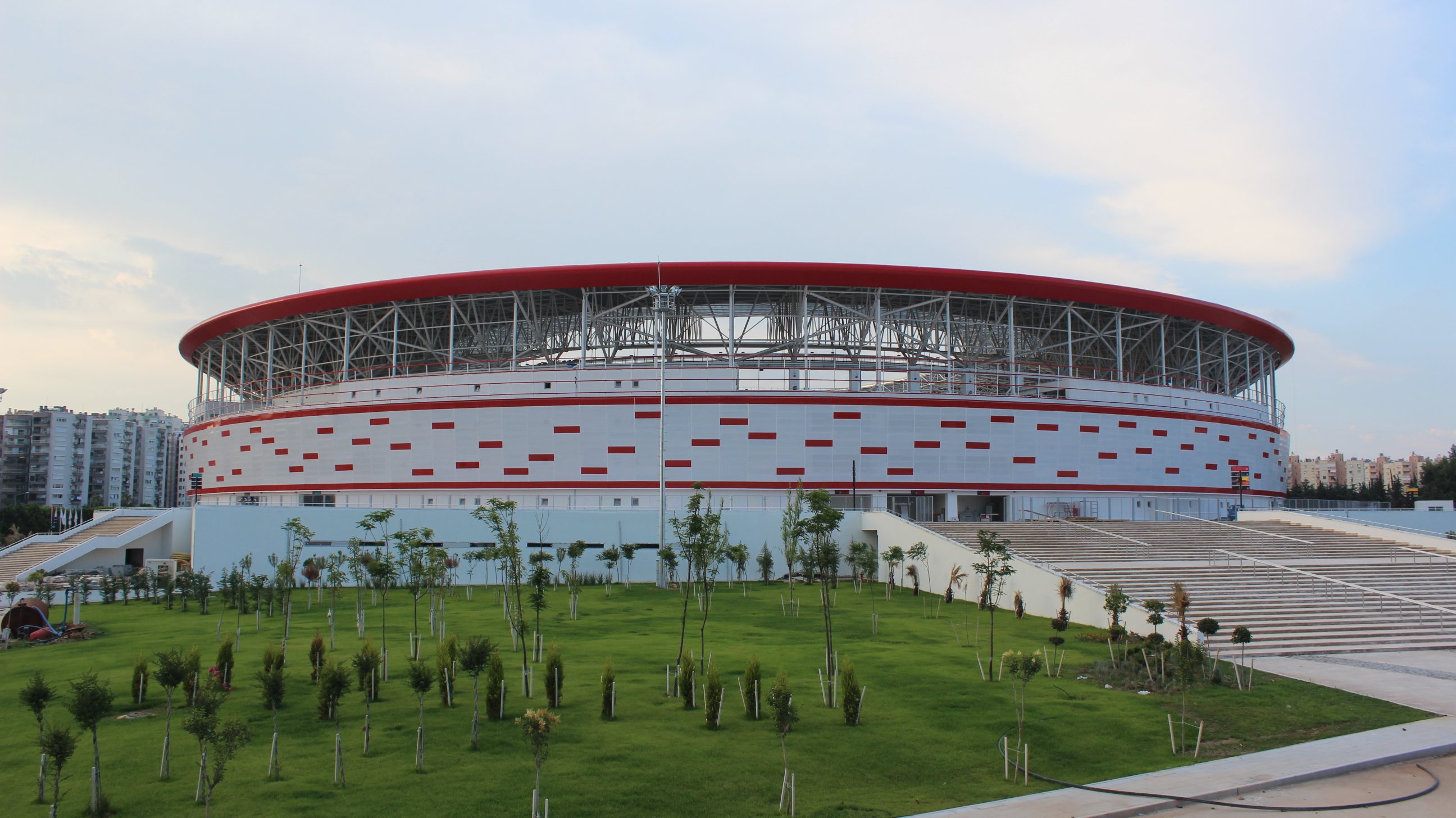
- The stadium at the final phase of construction in June 2015

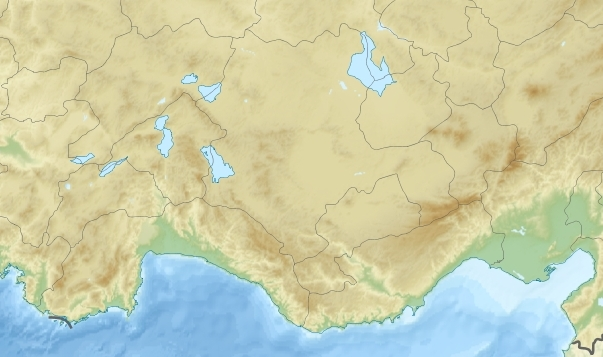
- Location in Southwestern Turkey Location in Turkey
- Full name: Corendon Airlines Park
- Location: Antalya, Turkey
- Coordinates: 36°53′17.8″N 30°40′06.4″E
- Owner: Ministry of Youth and Sports (Turkey)
- Operator: Antalyaspor
- Capacity: 32,537
- Executive suites: 42
- Surface: Grass
- Record attendance: 32,537 (Galatasaray-Fenerbahçe, 26 May 2016)
- Field size: 105 × 68 m

Construction
- Groundbreaking: 23 June 2013
- Built: 2013–2015
- Opened: 25 October 2015
- Cost: ₺103 million ($53 million in 2013)
- Architect: Azaksu Architecture Office

Tenants
- Antalyaspor (2015–present); Turkey national football team (selected matches)

The Antalya Stadium, officially branded as Corendon Airlines Park for sponsorship reasons, is a multi-purpose stadium in Antalya, Turkey. It is used mostly for football matches, hosting Turkish Süper Lig club Antalyaspor home matches. It has a capacity of nearly 32,537 (all seated) and is totally covered. The stadium has solar panels on its rooftop which generates, on average 7,200 kWh a day, enough to produce its total monthly electricity usage.

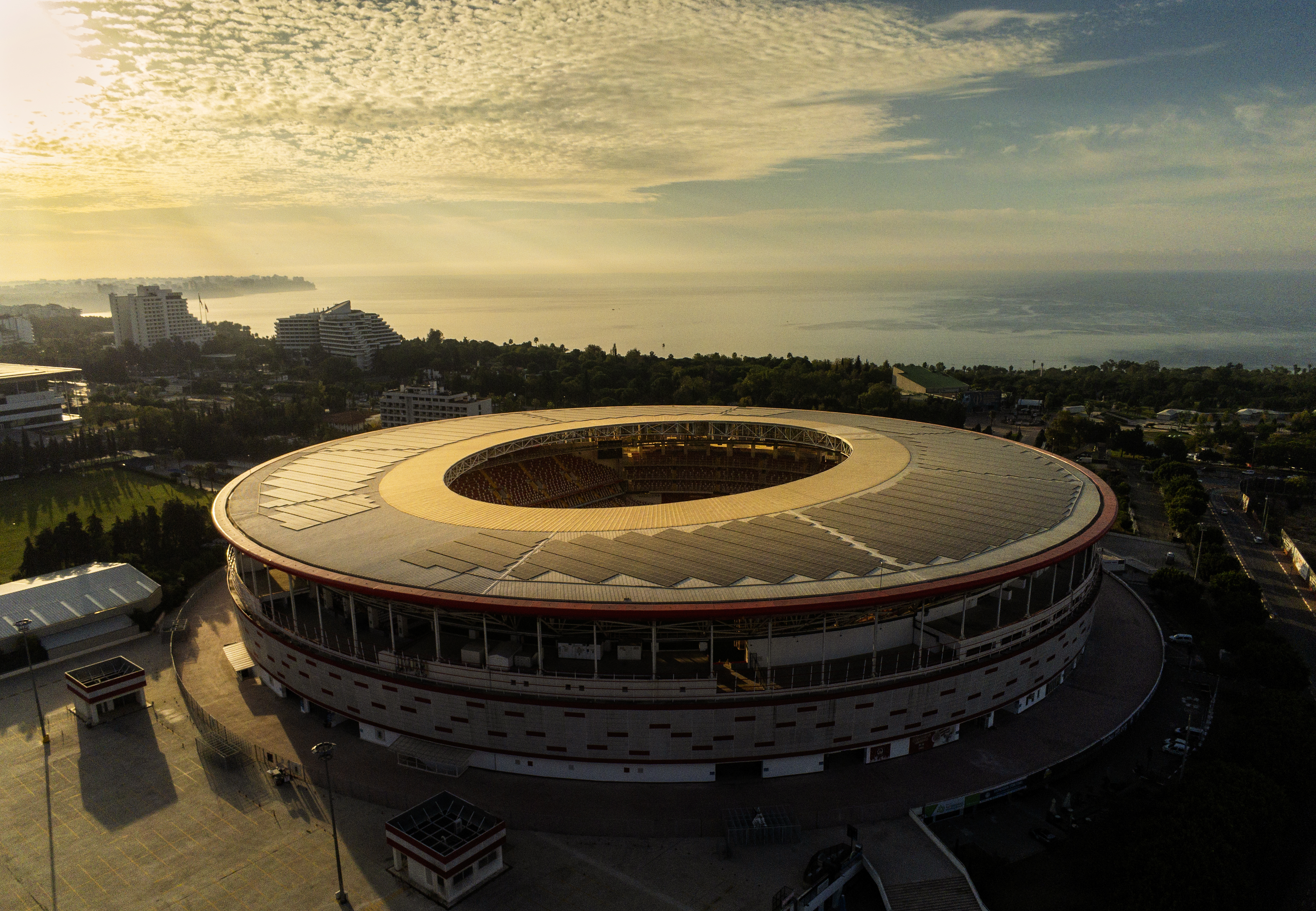
Antalya Stadium from outside.

== Matches ==
=== Turkish National Team ===
Antalya Stadium is one of the main home stadiums of the Turkish national Football team

Date	Time (CEST)	Team #1	Res.	Team #2	Round	Attendance
24 March 2016	20:45	Turkey	2–1	Sweden	Friendly	33,000
29 May 2016	19:00	Turkey	1–0	Montenegro	Friendly	30,000
31 August 2016	21:30	Turkey	0–0	Russia	Friendly	31,000
12 November 2016	20:00	Turkey	2–0	Kosovo	2018 FIFA World Cup qualifying	26,555
24 March 2017	20:00	Turkey	2–0	Finland	2018 FIFA World Cup qualifying	28,990
13 November 2017	20:30	Turkey	2–3	Albania	Friendly	8,000
23 March 2018	20:30	Turkey	1–0	Republic of Ireland	Friendly	32,000
20 November 2018	20:30	Turkey	0–0	Ukraine	Friendly	30,420
30 May 2019	21:00	Turkey	2–1	Greece	Friendly	30,000
31 May 2021	20:00	Turkey	0–0	Guinea	Friendly	0
