= Erkan Eyibil =

German footballer

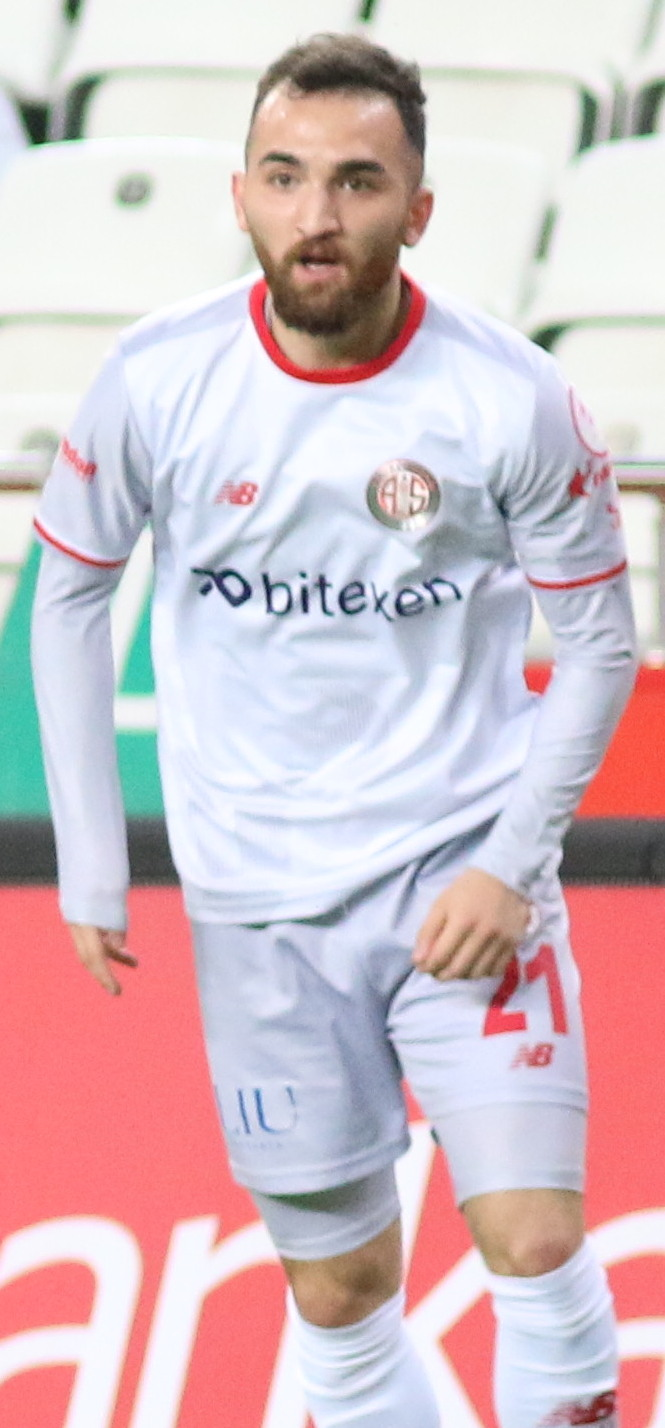
- Eyibil with Antalyaspor

Personal information
- Date of birth: 15 June 2001 (age 25)
- Place of birth: Kassel, Germany
- Height: 1.75 m (5 ft 9 in)
- Position: Midfielder

Team information
- Current team: 52 Orduspor
- Number: 30

Youth career
- 2009–2015: KSV Baunatal
- 2015–2020: Mainz 05

Senior career*
Years	Team	Apps	(Gls)
2020–2021	Mainz 05	0	(0)
2020–2021	→ Go Ahead Eagles (loan)	25	(2)
2021–2025	Antalyaspor	2	(0)
2022	→ VfB Stuttgart II (loan)	11	(2)
2023	→ Gençlerbirliği (loan)	15	(0)
2024	→ Ankara Keçiörengücü (loan)	9	(0)
2024–2025	→ Serik Belediyespor (loan)	31	(6)
2025–2026	Elazığspor	30	(8)
2026–	52 Orduspor	3	(0)

International career^{‡}
2016	Germany U15	2	(0)
2016–2017	Germany U16	7	(3)
2017–2018	Germany U17	8	(0)
2018–2019	Germany U18	5	(1)
2019	Germany U19	4	(0)
2020–2021	Turkey U21	9	(0)
- * Club domestic league appearances and goals as of 1 October 2026 ‡ National team caps and goals as of 16 November 2021

Erkan Eyibil (born 15 June 2001) is a professional footballer who plays as a midfielder for TFF 2. Lig club 52 Orduspor. Born in Germany, Eyibil represents Turkey internationally.

== International career ==
Born in Germany, Eyibil is of Turkish descent. He was a youth international for Germany, before switching to represent the Turkey U21s in 2020.

== Career statistics ==
=== Club ===
As of 15 September 2020

Appearances and goals by club, season and competition
Club	Season	League			Cup		Continental		Other		Total	
Club	Season	Division	Apps	Goals	Apps	Goals	Apps	Goals	Apps	Goals	Apps	Goals
Mainz 05	2020–21	Bundesliga	0	0	0	0	–		0	0	0	0
Go Ahead Eagles (loan)	2020–21	Eerste Divisie	25	2	3 (Note: Appearances in the KNVB Beker)	0	–		0	0	28	2
Career total			25	2	3	0	0	0	0	0	28	2
