= 2005 UEFA European Under-17 Championship squads =

Football tournament squads

Those marked in bold have now been capped at full International level.

== Group A ==
=== Belarus ===
Head coach: Petr Mikheyev

No.	Pos.	Player	Date of birth (age)	Caps	Club
1	GK	Igor Khomlyak	20 May 1988 (aged 16)		(Belarus) Shakhtyor Soligorsk
2	DF	**Aleh Veratsila**	10 July 1988 (aged 16)		(Belarus) Dinamo Minsk
3	MF	Aleksandr Petrov	8 February 1988 (aged 17)		(Belarus) Lokomotiv Vitebsk
4	MF	**Stanislaw Drahun**	4 June 1988 (aged 16)		(Belarus) Lokomotiv Minsk
5	DF	Yuri Ostroukh	21 January 1988 (aged 17)		(Belarus) Lida
6	MF	Vladimir Safrankov	5 January 1988 (aged 17)		(Belarus) Zvezda-BGU Minsk
7	MF	**Mikhail Sivakow**	16 January 1988 (aged 17)		(Belarus) BATE Borisov
8	FW	**Maksim Skavysh**	13 November 1989 (aged 15)		(Belarus) BATE Borisov
9	FW	Aleksey Zvonkov	20 April 1988 (aged 17)		(Belarus) MTZ-RIPO Minsk
10	FW	Sergey Kisly	2 January 1988 (aged 17)		(Belarus) MTZ-RIPO Minsk
11	FW	Aleksandr Kolotsey	27 January 1988 (aged 17)		(Belarus) BATE Borisov
12	GK	**Yegor Khatkevich**	9 July 1988 (aged 16)		(Belarus) BATE Borisov
13	MF	Andrey Kukharyonok	24 May 1988 (aged 16)		(Belarus) Lokomotiv Minsk
14	DF	Aleksey Shpilevskiy	17 February 1988 (aged 17)		(Germany) VfB Stuttgart
15	MF	Dzmitry Rekish	14 September 1988 (aged 16)		(Belarus) Dinamo Minsk
16	DF	Igor Lisitsa	10 April 1988 (aged 17)		(Belarus) Lida
17	MF	Anton Bubnov	23 November 1988 (aged 16)		(Belarus) MTZ-RIPO Minsk
18	DF	**Egor Filipenko**	10 April 1988 (aged 17)		(Belarus) BATE Borisov
19	DF	Igor Karpovich	2 August 1988 (aged 16)		(Belarus) Lida

=== England ===
Head coach: John Peacock

No.	Pos.	Player	Date of birth (age)	Caps	Club
1	GK	David Button	27 February 1989 (aged 16)		(England) Tottenham Hotspur
2	DF	Elliot Omozusi	15 December 1988 (aged 16)		(England) Fulham
3	DF	Scott Golbourne	29 February 1988 (aged 17)		(England) Bristol City
4	MF	Lewis McGugan	25 October 1988 (aged 16)		(England) Nottingham Forest
5	DF	Leigh Mills	8 February 1988 (aged 17)		(England) Tottenham Hotspur
6	DF	Michael Mancienne	8 January 1988 (aged 17)		(England) Chelsea
7	FW	**Theo Walcott**	16 March 1989 (aged 16)		(England) Southampton
8	MF	Mark Davies	18 February 1988 (aged 17)		(England) Wolverhampton Wanderers
9	FW	Joe Garner	12 April 1988 (aged 17)		(England) Blackburn Rovers
10	MF	Hogan Ephraim	31 March 1988 (aged 17)		(England) West Ham United
11	MF	Myles Weston	12 March 1988 (aged 17)		(England) Charlton Athletic
12	MF	Andy Gooding	30 April 1988 (aged 17)		(England) Coventry City
13	GK	Paddy Gamble	1 September 1988 (aged 16)		(England) Nottingham Forest
14	MF	Fabrice Muamba	6 April 1988 (aged 17)		(England) Arsenal
15	MF	Scott Phelan	13 March 1988 (aged 17)		(England) Everton
16	FW	Darryl Knights	1 May 1988 (aged 17)		(England) Ipswich Town
17	FW	James Vaughan	14 July 1988 (aged 16)		(England) Everton
18	DF	James Tomkins	29 March 1989 (aged 16)		(England) West Ham United

=== Italy ===
Head coach: Francesco Rocca

No.	Pos.	Player	Date of birth (age)	Caps	Goals	Club
1	GK	Enrico Alfonso	4 May 1988 (aged 16)	1	0	(Italian Football Federation) Chievo
2	DF	Davide Brivio	17 March 1988 (aged 17)	8	0	(Italian Football Federation) Atalanta
3	DF	**Lorenzo De Silvestri**	23 May 1988 (aged 16)	10	2	(Italian Football Federation) Lazio
4	DF	Michele Cremonesi	15 April 1988 (aged 17)	8	0	(Italian Football Federation) Cremonese
5	MF	Davide Di Gennaro	16 June 1988 (aged 16)	2	1	(Italian Football Federation) Milan
6	MF	Daniele Greco	16 June 1988 (aged 16)	7	1	(Italian Football Federation) Lazio
7	MF	Marco Mancosu	22 August 1988 (aged 16)	2	0	(Italian Football Federation) Cagliari
8	MF	Simone Palermo	17 August 1988 (aged 16)	5	2	(Italian Football Federation) Roma
9	FW	Marco Dalla Costa	25 March 1988 (aged 17)	2	0	(Italian Football Federation) Internazionale
10	MF	Ivan Castiglia	6 January 1988 (aged 17)	3	0	(Italian Football Federation) Reggina
11	FW	Salvatore Foti	8 August 1988 (aged 16)	7	3	(Italian Football Federation) Venezia
12	GK	Paolo Tornaghi	21 June 1988 (aged 16)	1	0	(Italian Football Federation) Internazionale
13	MF	Michael Cia	3 August 1988 (aged 16)	0	0	(Italian Football Federation) South Tyrol
14	DF	Massimiliano Tagliani	4 April 1989 (aged 16)	0	0	(Italian Football Federation) Brescia
15	MF	Michael Bacher	19 February 1988 (aged 17)	2	0	(Italian Football Federation) South Tyrol
16	DF	Manuel Angelucci	28 January 1988 (aged 17)	0	0	(Italian Football Federation) Ternana
17	FW	Piergiuseppe Maritato	19 March 1989 (aged 16)	0	0	(Italian Football Federation) Juventus
18	FW	Andrea Russotto	25 May 1988 (aged 16)		{{{goals}}}	(Italian Football Federation) Cisco Roma
19	GK	Simone Santarelli	7 September 1988 (aged 16)	1	0	(Italian Football Federation) Lazio

=== Turkey ===
Head coach: Abdullah Avcı

No.	Pos.	Player	Date of birth (age)	Caps	Club
1	GK	**Volkan Babacan**	11 August 1988 (aged 16)		(Turkey) Fenerbahçe
2	DF	Serdar Keşçi	18 January 1988 (aged 17)		(Turkey) Galatasaray
3	DF	Ferhat Bıkmaz	6 July 1988 (aged 16)		(Germany) Hannover 96
4	DF	Erkan Ferin	20 March 1988 (aged 17)		(Turkey) Galatasaray
5	DF	Mehmet Yılmaz	26 March 1988 (aged 17)		(Turkey) Bursaspor
6	DF	Harun Karadaş	14 January 1988 (aged 17)		(Turkey) Galatasaray
7	FW	Özgürcan Özcan	10 April 1988 (aged 17)		(Turkey) Galatasaray
8	MF	**Caner Erkin**	4 March 1988 (aged 17)		(Turkey) Vestel Manisaspor
9	FW	Tevfik Köse	12 July 1988 (aged 16)		(Germany) Bayer Leverkusen
10	MF	**Nuri Şahin**	5 September 1988 (aged 16)		(Germany) Borussia Dortmund
11	MF	Deniz Yılmaz	26 February 1988 (aged 17)		(Germany) SSV Ulm 1846
12	GK	**Onur Kıvrak**	1 January 1988 (aged 17)		(Turkey) Karşıyaka
13	DF	Anıl Taşdemir	1 January 1988 (aged 17)		(Turkey) Göztepe
14	MF	**Aydın Yılmaz**	29 January 1988 (aged 17)		(Turkey) Galatasaray
15	DF	Emre Balak	11 August 1988 (aged 16)		(Turkey) Samsunspor
16	MF	Umut Salgınoğlu	1 January 1988 (aged 17)		(Turkey) Adanaspor
17	MF	**Murat Duruer**	15 January 1988 (aged 17)		(Turkey) Ankaragücü
18	MF	Muhammed Ali Atam	21 May 1988 (aged 16)		(Turkey) Galatasaray

== Group B ==
=== Croatia ===
Head coach: Ivan Gudelj

No.	Pos.	Player	Date of birth (age)	Caps	Club
1	GK	**Ivan Kelava**	20 February 1988 (aged 17)		(Croatia) Dinamo Zagreb
2	MF	**Milan Badelj**	25 February 1989 (aged 16)		(Croatia) NK Zagreb
3	MF	Krešo Ljubičić	26 September 1988 (aged 16)		(Germany) Eintracht Frankfurt
4	DF	**Dejan Lovren**	5 July 1989 (aged 15)		(Croatia) Dinamo Zagreb
5	DF	Tomislav Kristić	20 June 1988 (aged 16)		(Croatia) Hajduk Split
6	MF	Saša Vukonić	22 July 1988 (aged 16)		(Croatia) Slaven Belupo
7	MF	Mislav Radoš	31 January 1988 (aged 17)		(Germany) SpVgg Unterhaching
8	MF	Davor Špehar	9 February 1988 (aged 17)		(Croatia) Dinamo Zagreb
9	FW	**Nikola Kalinić**	5 January 1988 (aged 17)		(Croatia) Hajduk Split
10	MF	Stipe Bačelić-Grgić	16 February 1988 (aged 17)		(Croatia) Hajduk Split
11	MF	Matija Špičić	24 February 1988 (aged 17)		(Croatia) NK Zagreb
12	GK	Josip Solić	24 February 1988 (aged 17)		(Croatia) Hajduk Split
13	DF	Danijel Rašić	5 October 1988 (aged 16)		(Croatia) Hajduk Split
14	MF	Stipe Glasović	27 February 1988 (aged 17)		(Croatia) Hajduk Split
15	FW	Mateas Delić	17 June 1988 (aged 16)		(Croatia) Slaven Belupo
16	FW	Damir Vidović	29 February 1988 (aged 17)		(Croatia) Dinamo Zagreb
17	FW	Grgur Radoš	31 January 1988 (aged 17)		(Germany) SpVgg Unterhaching
18	DF	Haris Mehmedagić	29 March 1988 (aged 17)		(Croatia) NK Zagreb

=== Israel ===
Head coach: Avraham Bahar

No.	Pos.	Player	Date of birth (age)	Caps	Club
1	GK	Guy Hadani	24 May 1988 (aged 16)		(Israel) Maccabi Tel Aviv
2	DF	Snir Mishan	13 November 1988 (aged 16)		(Israel) Maccabi Haifa
3	MF	Eliran Malka	29 February 1988 (aged 17)		(Israel) Beitar Tubruk
4	DF	Oshri Roash	25 July 1988 (aged 16)		(Israel) Hapoel Haifa
5	DF	Oded Elkayam	9 February 1988 (aged 17)		(Israel) Hapoel Haifa
6	MF	**Bibras Natcho**	18 February 1988 (aged 17)		(Israel) Hapoel Tel Aviv
7	MF	**Avi Rikan**	10 September 1988 (aged 16)		(Israel) Beitar Jerusalem
8	MF	**Maor Buzaglo**	14 January 1988 (aged 17)		(Israel) Maccabi Haifa
9	MF	Haim Salook	10 February 1988 (aged 17)		(Israel) Maccabi Tel Aviv
10	FW	**Dudu Biton**	1 March 1988 (aged 17)		(Israel) Maccabi Haifa
11	MF	**Beram Kayal**	2 May 1988 (aged 17)		(Israel) Maccabi Haifa
12	MF	Tomer Snappir	8 May 1988 (aged 16)		(Israel) Hapoel Kfar Saba
13	DF	Ran Abukarat	14 December 1988 (aged 16)		(Israel) Hapoel Haifa
14	FW	Dela Yampolsky	28 July 1988 (aged 16)		(Israel) Maccabi Netanya
15	DF	Amiran Shkalim	23 March 1988 (aged 17)		(Israel) Maccabi Tel Aviv
16	FW	Gil Cain	5 March 1988 (aged 17)		(Israel) Maccabi Tel Aviv
17	DF	Asher Tobi	24 January 1988 (aged 17)		(Israel) Hapoel Tel Aviv
18	GK	Robi Levkovich	31 August 1988 (aged 16)		(Israel) Hapoel Petah Tikva

=== Netherlands ===
Head coach: Ruud Kaiser

No.	Pos.	Player	Date of birth (age)	Caps	Club
1	GK	**Tim Krul**	3 April 1988 (aged 17)		(Netherlands) ADO Den Haag
2	DF	Robin Huisman de Jong	8 June 1988 (aged 16)		(Netherlands) Heerenveen
3	DF	**Dirk Marcellis**	13 April 1988 (aged 17)		(Netherlands) PSV
4	DF	Jordy Buijs	28 December 1988 (aged 16)		(Netherlands) Feyenoord
5	DF	Martijn van der Laan	29 July 1988 (aged 16)		(Netherlands) Groningen
6	MF	**Ruud Vormer**	8 May 1988 (aged 16)		(Netherlands) AZ
7	FW	Melvin Zaalman	17 June 1988 (aged 16)		(Netherlands) Sparta
8	MF	Jeffrey Sarpong	3 August 1988 (aged 16)		(Netherlands) Ajax
9	FW	Diego Biseswar	8 March 1988 (aged 17)		(Netherlands) Feyenoord
10	MF	**Vurnon Anita**	4 April 1988 (aged 17)		(Netherlands) Ajax
11	FW	John Goossens	25 July 1988 (aged 16)		(Netherlands) Ajax
12	DF	Ömer Özcelik	22 January 1988 (aged 17)		(Netherlands) Utrecht
13	MF	Niels Vorthoren	21 February 1988 (aged 17)		(Netherlands) Willem II
14	MF	Jerson Anes Ribeiro	9 March 1988 (aged 17)		(Netherlands) Feyenoord
15	DF	Mike van der Kooy	30 January 1988 (aged 17)		(Netherlands) Utrecht
16	GK	Koen Verhoeff	6 March 1988 (aged 17)		(Netherlands) Ajax
17	FW	Marvin Emnes	27 May 1988 (aged 16)		(Netherlands) Sparta
18	FW	Hanne Hagary	27 January 1988 (aged 17)		(Netherlands) Feyenoord

=== Switzerland ===
Head coach: Yves Débonnaire

No.	Pos.	Player	Date of birth (age)	Caps	Club
1	GK	**Yann Sommer**	17 December 1988 (aged 16)		(Switzerland) Basel
2	DF	Remo Staubli	7 October 1988 (aged 16)		(Switzerland) Zürich
3	DF	Jonas Elmer	28 February 1988 (aged 17)		(Switzerland) Grasshopper
4	DF	Davide Redzepi	15 January 1988 (aged 17)		(Switzerland) Young Boys
5	DF	Samuel Haas	7 January 1988 (aged 17)		(Switzerland) Grasshopper
6	MF	Damien Germanier	30 March 1988 (aged 17)		(Switzerland) Sion
7	FW	Fabio Klingler	30 December 1988 (aged 16)		(Switzerland) Winterthur
8	MF	Daniel Pavlović	22 April 1988 (aged 17)		(Germany) SC Freiburg
9	FW	Beqim Halimi	26 March 1988 (aged 17)		(Switzerland) Basel
10	MF	**Ivan Rakitić**	10 March 1988 (aged 17)		(Switzerland) Basel
11	MF	Christian Schneuwly	7 February 1988 (aged 17)		(Switzerland) Young Boys
12	GK	Kevin Fickentscher	6 July 1988 (aged 16)		(Germany) Werder Bremen
13	DF	Jan Hartmann	13 June 1988 (aged 16)		(Switzerland) Winterthur
14	DF	Raphaël Mollet	18 June 1988 (aged 16)		(Germany) SC Freiburg
15	MF	Angelo Dorsa	17 January 1988 (aged 17)		(Italy) Brescia
16	MF	**Shkëlzen Gashi**	15 July 1988 (aged 16)		(Switzerland) Zürich
17	DF	Gaetano Berardi	21 August 1988 (aged 16)		(Italy) Brescia
18	FW	**Moreno Costanzo**	20 February 1988 (aged 17)		(Switzerland) St. Gallen
