= 2020–21 Antalyaspor season =

Antalyaspor
2020–21 season
- President: Ali Şafak Öztürk (until 19 January 2021); Mustafa Yılmaz (from 23 February to 26 May 2021); Aziz Çetin (from 31 May 2021)
- Manager: Tamer Tuna (until 29 October 2020); Ersun Yanal (from 11 November 2020)
- Stadium: Antalya Stadium
- Süper Lig: 16th
- Turkish Cup: Runners-up
- Top goalscorer: League: Fredy (8); All: Fredy (10)
Home colours	Away colours	Third colours

The 2020–21 season was Antalyaspor's 55th season in existence and the club's sixth consecutive season in the top flight of Turkish football. In addition to the domestic league, Antalyaspor participated in this season's edition of the Turkish Cup. The season covered the period from 30 July 2020 to 30 June 2021.

== Kits ==
Supplier: Kappa / Main sponsor: Regnum / Sleeve sponsor: Corendon Airlines / Back sponsor: Anex Tour / Short sponsor: Adopen / Socks sponsor: 7 Mehmet

Home	Away	Third	Fourth

== Players ==
=== First-team squad ===
As of 14 February 2021

Note: Flags indicate national team as defined under FIFA eligibility rules; some limited exceptions apply. Players may hold more than one non-FIFA nationality.

No.	Pos.	Nation	Player
1	GK	TUR	Doğukan Özkan
2	DF	TUR	Ersan Gülüm
4	DF	BRA	Naldo
5	DF	TUR	Bahadır Öztürk
6	DF	TUR	Eren Albayrak
7	MF	TUR	Doğukan Sinik
8	MF	TUR	Nuri Şahin
9	MF	GER	Sidney Sam
10	FW	GER	Lukas Podolski
11	FW	JAM	Dever Orgill
13	DF	RUS	Fyodor Kudryashov
14	FW	CIV	Jean Armel Drolé
15	MF	TUR	Mevlüthan Ekelik
16	MF	ANG	Fredy

No.	Pos.	Nation	Player
17	MF	POR	Marcos Pereira
19	MF	GER	Ufuk Akyol
23	MF	BRA	Amilton
25	GK	BEL	Ruud Boffin
28	MF	ALB	Omar Imeri
29	GK	TUR	Enes Sahin
35	GK	TUR	Ferhat Kaplan
41	FW	TUR	Gökdeniz Bayrakdar
53	DF	TUR	Mert Yılmaz
77	DF	TUR	Bünyamin Balcı
88	MF	TUR	Hakan Özmert
89	DF	TUR	Veysel Sarı
99	DF	TUR	Ali Eren İyican

=== Out on loan ===
Note: Flags indicate national team as defined under FIFA eligibility rules; some limited exceptions apply. Players may hold more than one non-FIFA nationality.

No.	Pos.	Nation	Player
12	FW	NGR	Paul Mukairu (at Anderlecht)
22	MF	TUR	Harun Alpsoy (at Altay)
26	DF	TUR	Kaan Mert Nasırcılar (at BB Bodrumspor)
—	GK	TUR	Yakup Mert Çakır (at BB Bodrumspor)
—	DF	TUR	Cengiz Demir (at BB Bodrumspor)
—	DF	TUR	Batuhan Berkay Fındık (at BB Bodrumspor)

No.	Pos.	Nation	Player
—	MF	TUR	Harun Kavaklıdere (at BB Bodrumspor)
—	MF	TUR	Sergen Yatağan (at BB Bodrumspor)
—	FW	TUR	Mikail Başar (at BB Bodrumspor)
—	FW	TUR	Cenk Şen (at BB Bodrumspor)
—	FW	SWE	Erman Vardar (at BB Bodrumspor)
—	FW	ARG	Gustavo Blanco Leschuk (at Real Oviedo)

== Transfers ==
=== In ===
No.	Pos	Player	Transferred from	Fee	Date	Source
15			TBD		1 July 2020	

=== Out ===
No.	Pos	Player	Transferred to	Fee	Date	Source
15			TBD		1 July 2020	

== Pre-season and friendlies ==
Win Draw Loss Fixtures

=== Pre-season ===
31 August 2020 Friendly	Fenerbahçe (Turkey)	4–0	(Turkey) Antalyaspor	Istanbul
21:00 TRT (UTC+3)	Thiam 29', 40', 82'; Erkin 64' (pen.)			Stadium: Şükrü Saracoğlu Stadium; Attendance: 0 Referee: Onur Özütoprak

4 September 2020 Friendly	Beşiktaş (Turkey)	3–0	(Turkey) Antalyaspor	Istanbul
21:00 TRT (UTC+3)	Üner 3'; Mensah 40'; İşler 84'			Stadium: Vodafone Park; Attendance: 0 Referee: Mert Güzenge

=== Mid-season ===
10 October 2020 Friendly	Antalyaspor (Turkey)	1–1	(Turkey) Denizlispor	Antalya
17:30 TRT (UTC+3)	Jahović 88' (pen.)		Mešanović 85'	Stadium: Regnum Carya Golf & Spa Resort

== Competitions ==
=== Overview ===
Competition	First match	Last match	Starting round	Final position	Record							
Competition	First match	Last match	Starting round	Final position	Pld	W	D	L	GF	GA	GD	Win %
Süper Lig	13 September 2020	15 May 2021	Matchday 1	16th	40	9	17	14	41	55	−14	22.50
Turkish Cup	25 November 2020	18 May 2021	Fourth round	Runners-up	6	5	0	1	9	2	+7	83.33
Total					46	14	17	15	50	57	−7	30.43

Source: Soccerway

=== Süper Lig ===
==== League table ====
Pos	Team	Pld	W	D	L	GF	GA	GD	Pts	Qualification or relegation
14	Kasımpaşa	40	12	10	18	47	57	−10	46	
15	Yeni Malatyaspor	40	10	15	15	49	53	−4	45	
16	Antalyaspor	40	9	17	14	41	55	−14	44	
17	Kayserispor	40	9	14	17	35	52	−17	41	
18	BB Erzurumspor (R)	40	10	10	20	44	68	−24	40	Relegation to TFF First League

Source: Süper Lig, Soccerway
Rules for classification: 1) Points; 2) Head-to-head points; 3) Head-to-head goal difference; 4) Head-to-head goals scored; 5) Goal difference; 6) Goals scored; 7) Play-off.
(R) Relegated

==== Results summary ====
Overall								Home						Away					
Pld	W	D	L	GF	GA	GD	Pts	W	D	L	GF	GA	GD	W	D	L	GF	GA	GD
40	9	17	14	41	55	−14	44	6	7	7	24	28	−4	3	10	7	17	27	−10

Last updated: 15 May 2021.
Source: FBref

==== Results by round ====
Round	1	2	3	4	5	6	7	8	9	10	11	12	13	14	15	16	17	18	19	20	21	22	23	24	25	26	27	28	29	30	31	32	33	34	35	36	37	38	39	40	41	42
Ground	H	A	H	A	H	A	H	A	H	A	H	A	H	A	H	A	H	A	H	B	A	A	H	A	H	A	H	A	H	A	H	A	H	A	H	A	H	A	H	A	B	H
Result	W	D	W	L	D	L	L	D	L	D	W	D	W	L	L	D	W	W	D	B	D	W	D	D	D	D	D	D	D	L	W	L	L	W	L	L	L	D	L	L	B	D
Position	6	6	4	6	5	8	13	14	16	15	14	15	12	15	15	15	11	9	9	11	10	9	9	9	9	9	10	10	10	11	11	12	12	11	11	12	13	11	13	16	16	16

Updated to match(es) played on 15 May 2021. Source: Süper Lig
A = Away; H = Home; B = Bye; W = Win; D = Draw; L = Loss

Note: Since the league has been expanded to 21 teams each team will earn a bye twice this season.

==== Matches ====
13 September 2020 1	Antalyaspor	2–0	Gençlerbirliği	Antalya
20:00 TRT (UTC+3)	Amilton (yellow card) 39'; Balcı 41'; Özmert 77'	Report	Ângelo (yellow card) 53'	Stadium: Antalya Stadium; Attendance: 0 Referee: Yasin Kol

19 September 2020 2	Beşiktaş	1–1	Antalyaspor	Istanbul
19:00 TRT (UTC+3)	Hutchinson (yellow card) 10'; Toköz (yellow card) 27'; Larin 33'; Boyd (yellow card) 62'; Lens (yellow card) 90+1'; Bernard (yellow card) 90+3'	Report	Fredy (yellow card) 45+1'; Sarı (yellow card) 56'; Mukairu (yellow card) 83'; Bayrakdar 85'; Orgill (yellow card) 90'	Stadium: Vodafone Park; Attendance: 0 Referee: Halil Umut Meler

28 September 2020 3	Antalyaspor	1–0	Denizlispor	Antalya
20:00 TRT (UTC+3)	Sarı 58'	Report	Yumlu (yellow card) 80'; Yılmaz (yellow card) 90+1'	Stadium: Antalya Stadium; Attendance: 0 Referee: Halis Özkahya

3 October 2020 4	Yeni Malatyaspor	1–0	Antalyaspor	Malatya
13:30 TRT (UTC+3)	Tetteh 10'; Wallace (yellow card) 31'; Lukoki (yellow card) 38'; Hafez (yellow card) 45+4'; Damlu (yellow card) 86'	Report	Albayrak (yellow card) 38'; Fredy (yellow card) 67'	Stadium: Malatya Stadium; Attendance: 0 Referee: Alper Ulusoy

18 October 2020 5	Antalyaspor	1–1	Gaziantep	Antalya
16:00 TRT (UTC+3)	Sam 3' (red card) 79'; Sarı (yellow card) 31'; Kudryashov (yellow card) 49'; Sinik (yellow card) 86'; Akyol (yellow card) 90+4' (yellow-red card) 90+6'	Report	Morais (yellow card) 15' (yellow-red card) 65'; Mirallas (yellow card) 26' (yellow-red card) 28'; Djilobodji (yellow card) 38'; Soyalp 70'	Stadium: Antalya Stadium; Attendance: 0 Referee: Koray Gençerler

24 October 2020 6	İstanbul Başakşehir	5–1	Antalyaspor	Istanbul
19:00 TRT (UTC+3)	Višća 11' (pen.), 23'; Kahveci 27'; Crivelli 35'; Giuliano 83'	Report	Podolski 14'; Amilton (red card) 41'	Stadium: Fatih Terim Stadium; Attendance: 0 Referee: Ali Palabıyık

2 November 2020 7	Antalyaspor	1–2	Fenerbahçe	Antalya
20:00 TRT (UTC+3)	Sarı (yellow card) 37'; Jahović (red card) 45'; Orgill (yellow card) 50'; Podolski 52'	Report	Tufan 46'; Valencia (yellow card) 60'; Perotti 84' (pen.); Gümüş (yellow card) 90+6' (yellow-red card) 90+6'	Stadium: Antalya Stadium; Attendance: 0 Referee: Bahattin Şimşek

7 November 2020 8	Kasımpaşa	2–2	Antalyaspor	Istanbul
13:30 TRT (UTC+3)	Koita 8'; Sadiku (yellow card) 62'; Hodžić 65'; Tirpan (yellow card) 82'; Haddadi (yellow card) 90+6'	Report	Sarı 72'; Sam 90+2'	Stadium: Recep Tayyip Erdoğan Stadium; Attendance: 0 Referee: Serkan Tokat

22 November 2020 9	Antalyaspor	0–2	Alanyaspor	Antalya
19:00 TRT (UTC+3)	Naldo (yellow card) 24'; Özmert (yellow card) 46' (yellow-red card) 67'; Bayrakdar (yellow card) 67'; Albayrak (yellow card) 69'	Report	Uçan 55'; Davidson (yellow card) 81'; Kutlu 84'	Stadium: Antalya Stadium; Attendance: 0 Referee: Özgür Yankaya

29 November 2020 10	BB Erzurumspor	2–2	Antalyaspor	Erzurum
13:30 TRT (UTC+3)	Kanak 29' (yellow card) 32'; Mina (yellow card) 59'; Donald (yellow card) 80'; Gomes 85'	Report	Sarı 60'; Bayrakdar 65'; Naldo (yellow card) 82' (yellow-red card) 89'; Albayrak (yellow card) 84'	Stadium: Kazım Karabekir Stadium; Attendance: 0 Referee: Ali Şansalan

6 December 2020 11	Antalyaspor	1–0	Ankaragücü	Antalya
16:00 TRT (UTC+3)	Bayrakdar (yellow card) 42'; Podolski (yellow card) 45'; Jahović 45+4'; Amilton (yellow card) 51'	Report	Potuk (yellow card) 22'; Kitsiou (yellow card) 28'	Stadium: Antalya Stadium; Attendance: 0 Referee: Halil Umut Meler

14 December 2020 12	Sivasspor	0–0	Antalyaspor	Sivas
19:00 TRT (UTC+3)	Gradel (yellow card) 90+3'	Report		Stadium: Sivas Stadium; Attendance: 0 Referee: Halis Özkahya

21 December 2020 13	Antalyaspor	2–0	Kayserispor	Antalya
19:00 TRT (UTC+3)	Sam (yellow card) 34' (goal) 41'; Amilton 37' (yellow card) 37'; Şahin (yellow card) 90+6'; Naldo (yellow card) 90+7'	Report	Campanharo (yellow card) 86'	Stadium: Antalya Stadium; Attendance: 0 Referee: Ümit Öztürk

24 December 2020 14	Çaykur Rizespor	2–1	Antalyaspor	Rize
19:00 TRT (UTC+3)	Pehlivan 6'; Torun (yellow card) 11'; Baiano (yellow card) 41'; Škoda 59'; Erdoğan (yellow card) 76'	Report	Amilton (yellow card) 11'; Sarı (yellow card) 45'; Podolski 61'	Stadium: Çaykur Didi Stadium; Attendance: 0 Referee: Erkan Özdamar

29 December 2020 15	Antalyaspor	0–6	Hatayspor	Antalya
19:00 TRT (UTC+3)	Özmert (yellow card) 5'; Orgill (yellow card) 26'; Fredy (yellow card) 38'; Naldo (yellow card) 52'; Kudryashov (yellow card) 62'; Şahin (yellow card) 69'	Report	Boupendza 8', 17', 22', 45+2'; Akintola 35'; Katranis (yellow card) 53'; Traoré (yellow card) 61'; Çaytemel (yellow card) 74'; Aydın 90'	Stadium: Antalya Stadium; Attendance: 0 Referee: Ramazan Keleş

2 January 2021 16	Galatasaray	0–0	Antalyaspor	Istanbul
19:00 TRT (UTC+3)	Kılınç (red card) 51'; Marcão (yellow card) 55'; Turan (yellow card) 81'	Report	Fredy (yellow card) 69'; Özmert (yellow card) 80'; Gülüm (yellow card) 90+3'; Bayrakdar (yellow card) 90+5'	Stadium: Türk Telekom Stadium; Attendance: 0 Referee: Abdulkadir Bitigen

6 January 2021 17	Antalyaspor	3–1	Fatih Karagümrük	Antalya
19:00 TRT (UTC+3)	Özmert 13' (pen.); Şahin (yellow card) 34'; Bayrakdar 39'; Albayrak 71'	Report	Balkovec 10'; Altınay (yellow card) 16'; Roco (red card) 84'; Çolak (yellow card) 90+2'	Stadium: Antalya Stadium; Attendance: 0 Referee: Hüseyin Göçek

9 January 2021 18	Göztepe	0–1	Antalyaspor	İzmir
16:00 TRT (UTC+3)	Paluli (yellow card) 8'; Mihojević (yellow card) 50'; Aydoğdu (yellow card) 55'	Report	Fredy (yellow card) 72'; Sinik 77'	Stadium: Gürsel Aksel Stadium; Attendance: 0 Referee: Mert Güzenge

16 January 2021 19	Antalyaspor	1–1	Trabzonspor	Antalya
19:00 TRT (UTC+3)	Ersan Gülüm (yellow card) 11' (yellow-red card) 33'; Fredy (yellow card) 13'; Amilton 25'; Hakan Özmert (yellow card) 69'; Ruud Boffin (yellow card) 78'	Report	Pereira (yellow card) 82'; Afobe 90+5'	Stadium: Antalya Stadium; Attendance: 0 Referee: Ali Palabıyık

20	Bye

24 January 2021 21	Konyaspor	0–0	Antalyaspor	Konya
13:30 TRT (UTC+3)	Hadžiahmetović (yellow card) 31'	Report	Amilton (yellow card) 70'	Stadium: Konya Büyükşehir Stadium; Attendance: 0 Referee: Tugay Kaan Numanoğlu

31 January 2021 22	Gençlerbirliği	0–1	Antalyaspor	Ankara
16:00 TRT (UTC+3)	Dikmen (yellow card) 80'; Berişbek (yellow card) 90+1'	Report	Orgill (yellow card) 68'; Sam 87'	Stadium: Eryaman Stadium; Attendance: 0 Referee: Bahattin Şimşek

3 February 2021 23	Antalyaspor	1–1	Beşiktaş	Antalya
19:00 TRT (UTC+3)	Boffin (yellow card) 36'; Bayrakdar 40'; Sarı (yellow card) 70'; Naldo (yellow card) 90+1'	Report	Mensah (yellow card) 64'; Vida 73'	Stadium: Antalya Stadium; Attendance: 0 Referee: Alper Ulusoy

7 February 2021 24	Denizlispor	1–1	Antalyaspor	Denizli
16:00 TRT (UTC+3)	Rodallega 14'; Aktaş (yellow card) 45+2'; Murawski (yellow card) 67'	Report	Bayrakdar 73' (yellow card) 85'; Boffin (yellow card) 90+4'	Stadium: Denizli Atatürk Stadium; Attendance: 0 Referee: Zorbay Küçük

15 February 2021 25	Antalyaspor	1–1	Yeni Malatyaspor	Antalya
19:00 TRT (UTC+3)	Orgill 5'	Report	Orgill 12' (o.g.)	Stadium: Antalya Stadium; Attendance: 0 Referee: Serkan Tokat

21 February 2021 26	Gaziantep	0–0	Antalyaspor	Gaziantep
16:00 TRT (UTC+3)	Roderick (yellow card) 31'; Vetrih (yellow card) 77'	Report	Özmert (yellow card) 77'	Stadium: Kalyon Stadium; Attendance: 0 Referee: Arda Kardeşler

27 February 2021 27	Antalyaspor	0–0	İstanbul Başakşehir	Antalya
16:00 TRT (UTC+3)	Podolski (yellow card) 86'	Report		Stadium: Antalya Stadium; Attendance: 0 Referee: Fırat Aydınus

4 March 2021 28	Fenerbahçe	1–1	Antalyaspor	Istanbul
19:00 TRT (UTC+3)	Szalai (yellow card) 7'; Valencia 83'; Cissé (yellow card) 88'; Kadıoğlu (yellow card) 89'; Pelkas (yellow card) 90+3'; Sosa (yellow card) 90+7'	Report	Fredy 12' (yellow card) 21'; Amilton (yellow card) 33'; Sarı (yellow card) 39'; Naldo (yellow card) 61'; Orgill (yellow card) 89'; Boffin (red card) 90+10'	Stadium: Ülker Stadium; Attendance: 0 Referee: Ümit Öztürk

8 March 2021 29	Antalyaspor	1–1	Kasımpaşa	Antalya
16:00 TRT (UTC+3)	Özmert 38'; Fredy (yellow card) 45'	Report	Thelin (yellow card) 9' (goal) 72'; Kara (yellow card) 36'; Bistrović (yellow card) 64'	Stadium: Antalya Stadium; Attendance: 0 Referee: Serkan Tokat

13 March 2021 30	Alanyaspor	4–0	Antalyaspor	Alanya
16:00 TRT (UTC+3)	Babacar 28' (pen.); Pektemek 39'; Bekiroğlu 83'; Gülselam 90+5'	Report	Orgill (yellow card) 24'; Boffin (yellow card) 28'; Özmert (yellow card) 45'; Bayrakdar (yellow card) 60'; Balcı (yellow card) 65'	Stadium: Bahçeşehir Okulları Stadium; Attendance: 0 Referee: Sarper Barış Saka

21 March 2021 31	Antalyaspor	3–1	BB Erzurumspor	Antalya
13:30 TRT (UTC+3)	Özmert (yellow card) 40'; Fredy 54'; Bayrakdar 66'; Balcı 70'; Sarı (yellow card) 90+2'	Report	Butko (yellow card) 16'; Chahechouhe 39'; Bergdich (yellow card) 79'; Çelik (yellow card) 81'	Stadium: Antalya Stadium; Attendance: 0 Referee: Erkan Özdamar

4 April 2021 32	Ankaragücü	1–0	Antalyaspor	Ankara
16:00 TRT (UTC+3)	Pazdan (yellow card) 21'; Çekiçi (yellow card) 54'; Børven 83'	Report	Özmert (yellow card) 30'; Balcı (yellow card) 56'; Şahin (yellow card) 61'; Sarı (yellow card) 69'	Stadium: Eryaman Stadium; Attendance: 0 Referee: Ali Palabıyık

7 April 2021 33	Antalyaspor	2–4	Sivasspor	Antalya
19:00 TRT (UTC+3)	Fredy 27' (pen.), 67', (yellow card) 90+5'; Sinik (yellow card) 73'; Amilton (yellow card) 90+1'	Report	Boyd 1', 36'; Yalçın (yellow card) 45'; Yatabaré 47'; Çiftçi (yellow card) 73'; Yeşilyurt 90+3'	Stadium: Antalya Stadium; Attendance: 0 Referee: Özgür Yankaya

11 April 2021 34	Kayserispor	0–1	Antalyaspor	Kayseri
16:00 TRT (UTC+3)	Behich (yellow card) 45+5'; Kvržić (yellow card) 90+2'	Report	Kudryashov (yellow card) 17'; Şahin (yellow card) 27'; Naldo 45'; Balcı (yellow card) 68'; İyican (yellow card) 90+4'	Stadium: Kadir Has Stadium; Attendance: 0 Referee: Tugay Kaan Numanoğlu

16 April 2021 35	Antalyaspor	2–3	Çaykur Rizespor	Antalya
19:00 TRT (UTC+3)	Sarı (yellow card) 27', (goal) 33'; Podolski (yellow card) 49'; Naldo 87'	Report	Köybaşı 3'; Boldrin 5'; Sabo 65'; Baiano (yellow card) 71'; Pehlivan (yellow card) 90+3'	Stadium: Antalya Stadium; Attendance: 0 Referee: Suat Arslanboğa

20 April 2021 36	Hatayspor	3–2	Antalyaspor	Hatay
19:00 TRT (UTC+3)	Boupendza 19', 68'; Diouf 55' (pen.), (yellow card) 90+6'; Ribeiro (yellow card) 90+2'	Report	Amilton 46'; Fredy 86' (pen.)	Stadium: Antakya Atatürk Stadium; Attendance: 0 Referee: Bahattin Şimşek

24 April 2021 37	Antalyaspor	0–1	Galatasaray	Antalya
20:30 TRT (UTC+3)	Podolski (yellow card) 26' (yellow-red card) 59'; Yılmaz (yellow card) 33'; Şahin (yellow card) 82'; Naldo (yellow card) 88'; Kudryashov (yellow card) 90+7' (yellow-red card) 90+7'	Report	Mohamed 77'; Turan (yellow card) 79'	Stadium: Antalya Stadium; Attendance: 0 Referee: Mete Kalkavan

28 April 2021 38	Fatih Karagümrük	2–2	Antalyaspor	Bursa
16:00 TRT (UTC+3)	Albayrak 13' (o.g.); Borini 24'; Bertolacci (yellow card) 49'; Roco (yellow card) 62'; Zukanović (yellow card) 87'; Castro (yellow card) 89'	Report	Fredy 34' (pen.); Akyol (yellow card) 45'; Boffin (yellow card) 90+2'; Amilton 90+4'	Stadium: Bursa Büyükşehir Stadium; Attendance: 0 Referee: Zorbay Küçük

2 May 2021 39	Antalyaspor	2–3	Göztepe	Antalya
16:00 TRT (UTC+3)	Fredy 5' (pen.); Podolski 67'	Report	Esiti 31'; Alıcı (yellow card) 48'; Jahović 66'; Nukan 84'	Stadium: Antalya Stadium; Attendance: 0 Referee: Atilla Karaoğlan

8 May 2021 40	Trabzonspor	2–1	Antalyaspor	Trabzon
20:30 TRT (UTC+3)	Nwakaeme 13'; Ömür 49'; Ekuban (yellow card) 85'	Report	Naldo (yellow card) 60'; Amilton 67'; Fredy (yellow card) 77'; Boffin (yellow card) 90+4'	Stadium: Medical Park Stadium; Attendance: 0 Referee: Abdulkadir Bitigen

41	Bye

15 May 2021 42	Antalyaspor	0–0	Konyaspor	Antalya
18:00 TRT (UTC+3)	Orgill (yellow card) 30'; Ekelik (yellow card) 80'; Bayrakdar (yellow card) 90'	Report	Rahmanović (yellow card) 3'; Sekidika (yellow card) 75'	Stadium: Antalya Stadium; Attendance: 0 Referee: Suat Arslanboğa

=== Turkish Cup ===
25 November 2020 Fourth round	Antalyaspor	2–0	Pendikspor	Antalya
19:00 TRT (UTC+3)	Fredy 40'; Jahović 77' (pen.)	Report	Lale (yellow card) 11'; Ataklı (yellow card) 36'	Stadium: Antalya Stadium; Attendance: 0 Referee: Direnç Tonusluoğlu

17 December 2020 Fifth round	Antalyaspor	1–0	Boluspor	Antalya
15:00 TRT (UTC+3)	Şahin (yellow card) 16'; Bayrakdar 52' (yellow card) 72'	Report	Asan (yellow card) 36'; Marlinho (yellow card) 79'; Okutan (yellow card) 90+2'	Stadium: Antalya Stadium; Attendance: 0 Referee: Cihan Aydın

12 January 2021 Round of 16	Bursaspor	0–3	Antalyaspor	Bursa
15:45 TRT (UTC+3)	Keskin (yellow card) 90+2'	Report	Özmert 6' (pen.); Bayrakdar 34'; Jahović 37'; Gülüm (yellow card) 54'	Stadium: Bursa Büyükşehir Stadium; Attendance: 0 Referee: Yasin Kol

11 February 2021 Quarter-finals	Sivasspor	0–1	Antalyaspor	Sivas
17:45 TRT (UTC+3)	Kesgin (yellow card) 19'	Report	Fredy 62' (pen.); Gülüm (yellow card) 90+1'; Boffin (yellow card) 90+2'	Stadium: Sivas Stadium; Attendance: 0 Referee: Tugay Kaan Numanoğlu

17 March 2021 Semi-finals	Antalyaspor	2–0	Alanyaspor	Antalya
20:45 TRT (UTC+3)	Podolski 18', (yellow card) 35'; Amilton (yellow card) 25'; Albayrak (yellow card) 27'; Bayrakdar (yellow card) 56'; Gürler (yellow card) 56'; Özmert (yellow card) 59', (goal) 82'	Report	Bingöl (yellow card) 25'; Kutlu (yellow card) 32'; Pektemek (yellow card) 71'; Siopis (yellow card) 75'; Bekiroğlu (yellow card) 78'; Tzavellas (yellow card) 79'	Stadium: Antalya Stadium; Attendance: 0 Referee: Mustafa Öğretmenoğlu

18 May 2021 Final	Antalyaspor	0–2	Beşiktaş	İzmir
20:45 TRT (UTC+3)	Şahin (yellow card) 64'; Kudryashov (yellow card) 73'; Naldo (yellow card) 86'	Report	De Souza 3'; Rosier 30'; Yuvakuran (yellow card) 87'	Stadium: Gürsel Aksel Stadium; Attendance: 0 Referee: Ali Palabıyık

== Statistics ==
=== Goalscorers ===
Rank	No.	Pos	Nat	Player	Süper Lig	Turkish Cup	Total
1	16	MF	(Angola)	Fredy	8	2	10
2	41	FW	(Turkey)	Gökdeniz Bayrakdar	6	2	8
3	10	FW	(Germany)	Lukas Podolski	5	1	6
4	23	MF	(Brazil)	Amilton	5	0	5
4	88	MF	(Turkey)	Hakan Özmert	3	2	5
6	9	MF	(Germany)	Sidney Sam	3	0	3
6	18	FW	(North Macedonia)	Adis Jahović	1	2	3
6	89	DF	(Turkey)	Veysel Sarı	3	0	3
9	4	DF	(Brazil)	Naldo	2	0	2
9	77	DF	(Turkey)	Bünyamin Balcı	2	0	2
11	6	DF	(Turkey)	Eren Albayrak	1	0	1
11	7	MF	(Turkey)	Doğukan Sinik	1	0	1
11	11	FW	(Jamaica)	Dever Orgill	1	0	1
Own goals					0	0	0
Totals					41	9	50
