= Gökdeniz Bayrakdar =

Turkish footballer (born 2001)

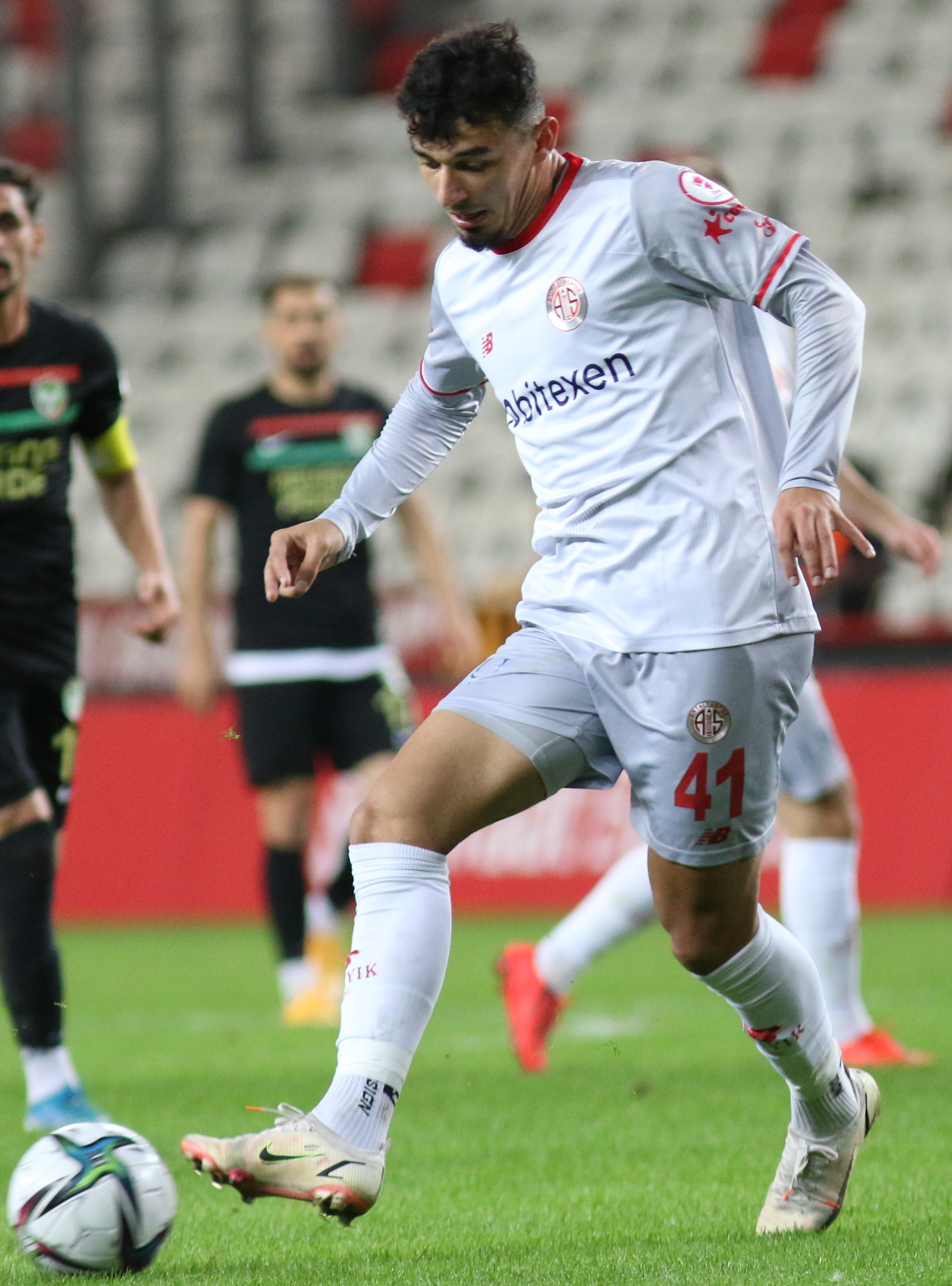
- Bayrakdar with Antalyaspor in 2021

Personal information
- Full name: Gökdeniz Bayrakdar
- Date of birth: 23 November 2001 (age 24)
- Place of birth: Kandıra, Turkey
- Height: 1.81 m (5 ft 11 in)
- Position: Winger

Team information
- Current team: Göztepe
- Number: 17

Youth career
- 2013–2014: Yenişehirspor
- 2014–2016: Kandıra
- 2016–2017: Kocaelispor

Senior career*
Years	Team	Apps	(Gls)
2017–2020	Kocaelispor	79	(20)
2020–2023	Antalyaspor	73	(10)
2023	→ Bodrumspor (loan)	18	(9)
2023–2026	Bodrum	70	(9)
2026–	Göztepe	0	(0)

International career^{‡}
2020	Turkey U19	4	(0)
2021–2022	Turkey U21	11	(1)
- * Club domestic league appearances and goals as of 18 October 2026 ‡ National team caps and goals as of 14 June 2022

Gökdeniz Bayrakdar (born 23 November 2001) is a Turkish professional footballer who plays as a winger for Süper Lig club Göztepe. He has represented Turkey at youth level.

== Early years ==
Gökdeniz Bayrakdar was born on 23 November 2001, in Kandıra, Kocaeli Province to a family originally from Trabzon. He has two older brothers, and his father owns a grocery story, and his mother is a housewife. As his family were passionate Trabzonspor fans, Bayrakdar was named after their club legend, Gökdeniz Karadeniz.

Bayrakdar quickly became devoted to football, and started playing on the streets. At age nine, he was enrolled by his father at a football school in his hometown of Kandıra, before playing in the youth teams of Yenişehirspor and Kandıra. He was then scouted by Kocaelispor after three successful training sessions.

== Club career ==
=== Kocaelispor ===
Bayrakdar made his senior debut after one year at the Kocaelispor academy as a substitute in a 1–0 Turkish Cup loss to Düzcespor on 30 August 2017. His first league appearance followed on 10 September, as he came off the bench in 77th minute for Burak Süleyman in a 2–1 home loss to Uşakspor in the fourth level TFF Third League. On 15 October, Bayrakdar scored his first goal in a 1–1 draw against Osmaniyespor.

=== Antalyaspor ===
After successful seasons and interest from Beşiktaş, Bayrakdar signed a contract with Antalyaspor in the summer of 2020 after Kocaelispor's 10-year transfer ban had been lifted. Bayrakdar made his professional debut for the club on 19 September 2020, coming off the bench for Nuri Şahin in a 1–1 Süper Lig draw against Beşiktaş on 19 September 2020, scoring his side's only goal in his debut.

=== Bodrumspor ===
On 11 January 2023, Bayrakdar joined Bodrumspor on loan until the end of the 2022–23 season, with an option to buy.

== International career ==
Bayrakdar has been capped for Turkey U19 and Turkey U21.

== Style of play ==
Bayrakdar has been utilised in a variety of positions due to his technical skill set and his understanding of the game. He can play as a striker, a winger or as an attacking midfielder. Usually deployed on the right wing, Bayrakdar often cuts inside on his left foot to move to a more central attacking position, and uses his speed and dribbling skills to take on defenders until he finds the space to make an attempt on goal, much like Arjen Robben. In addition, he has a pronounced goal instinct.

== Career statistics ==
=== Club ===
As of match played 16 March 2025

Appearances and goals by club, season and competition
Club	Season	League			Turkish Cup		Other		Total	
Club	Season	Division	Apps	Goals	Apps	Goals	Apps	Goals	Apps	Goals
Kocaelispor	2017–18	TFF Third League	19	3	1	0	—		20	3
Kocaelispor	2018–19	TFF Third League	32	5	2	0	2 (Note: Appearances in TFF Third League promotion play-offs)	0	36	5
Kocaelispor	2019–20	TFF Third League	27	12	2	1	—		29	13
Kocaelispor	Total		78	20	5	1	2	0	85	21
Antalyaspor	2020–21	Süper Lig	31	6	6	2	—		37	8
Antalyaspor	2021–22	Süper Lig	29	2	5	4	1 (Note: Appearance in Turkish Super Cup)	0	35	6
Antalyaspor	2022–23	Süper Lig	13	2	2	0	—		15	2
Antalyaspor	Total		73	10	13	6	1	0	87	16
Bodrum (loan)	2022–23	TFF 1. Lig	22	9	—		—		22	9
Bodrum	2023–24	TFF 1. Lig	37	9	1	0	—		38	9
Bodrum	2024–25	Süper Lig	22	0	4	4	—		26	4
Bodrum	Total		59	9	5	4	—		64	13
Career total			222	48	23	11	3	0	258	59
