= Hadani =

Hadani, Hadany, ha-Dani, etc. (Hebrew: הדני), is a Hebrew surname meaning "the judge". Notable people with this surname include:

- Amnon "Ami" Hadani, founder of TTG Studios, an American recording studio
- Eldad ha-Dani, 9th-century merchant, traveller, and writer
- Gal Hadani, drummer of Ethnix, an Israeli pop-rock band
- Guy Hadani (born 1988), Israeli footballer
- Israel Hadany (born 1941), Israeli artist, sculptor, and jewelry designer
