= Michael Bacher =

Italian footballer

Personal information
- Date of birth: 19 February 1988 (age 38)
- Place of birth: Brixen, Italy
- Height: 1.74 m (5 ft 9 in)
- Position: Midfielder

Team information
- Current team: AC Trento
- Number: 20

Youth career
- –2006: South Tyrol

Senior career*
Years	Team	Apps	(Gls)
2004–2012	South Tyrol	124	(5)
2010–2011	→ Cremonese (loan)	15	(0)
2012–2013	Legnago Salus		
2013–2014	Real Vicenza	17	(0)
2014–2015	Pordenone	10	(0)
2015	Pro Piacenza	15	(0)
2015–2016	Correggese	33	(1)
2016	Altovicentino	11	(0)
2017	Viareggio 2014	8	(1)
2017–	AC Trento	5	(0)

International career
2004–2005	Italy U17	4	(0)
2006–2009	Italy U20 Lega Pro	1	(0)
- * Club domestic league appearances and goals as of 4 November 2017

Michael Bacher (born 19 February 1988) is an Italian footballer who plays for AC Trento.

== Biography ==
Born in Brixen, South Tyrol autonomous province as German speaking minority (majority in the province), Bacher started his professional career at FC South Tyrol, located in Bolzano, the capital of the province. On 2 July 2010 Bacher left for fellow third division club Cremonese.

=== International career ===
He was a member of Italy national under-17 football team in 2005 UEFA European Under-17 Football Championship (2 games).

He received call-up to Italy U20 Lega Pro team, for a 2006–07 Mirop Cup match against Slovakia. He played again in February 2009 against Hungary in 2008–09 Mirop Cup. He also played in 2009 Lega Pro Quadrangular Tournament for the representatives of Second Division Group A.

== Honours ==
- Lega Pro Seconda Divisione: 2010 (South Tyrol)
