= Sidney Sam =

German professional footballer (born 1988)

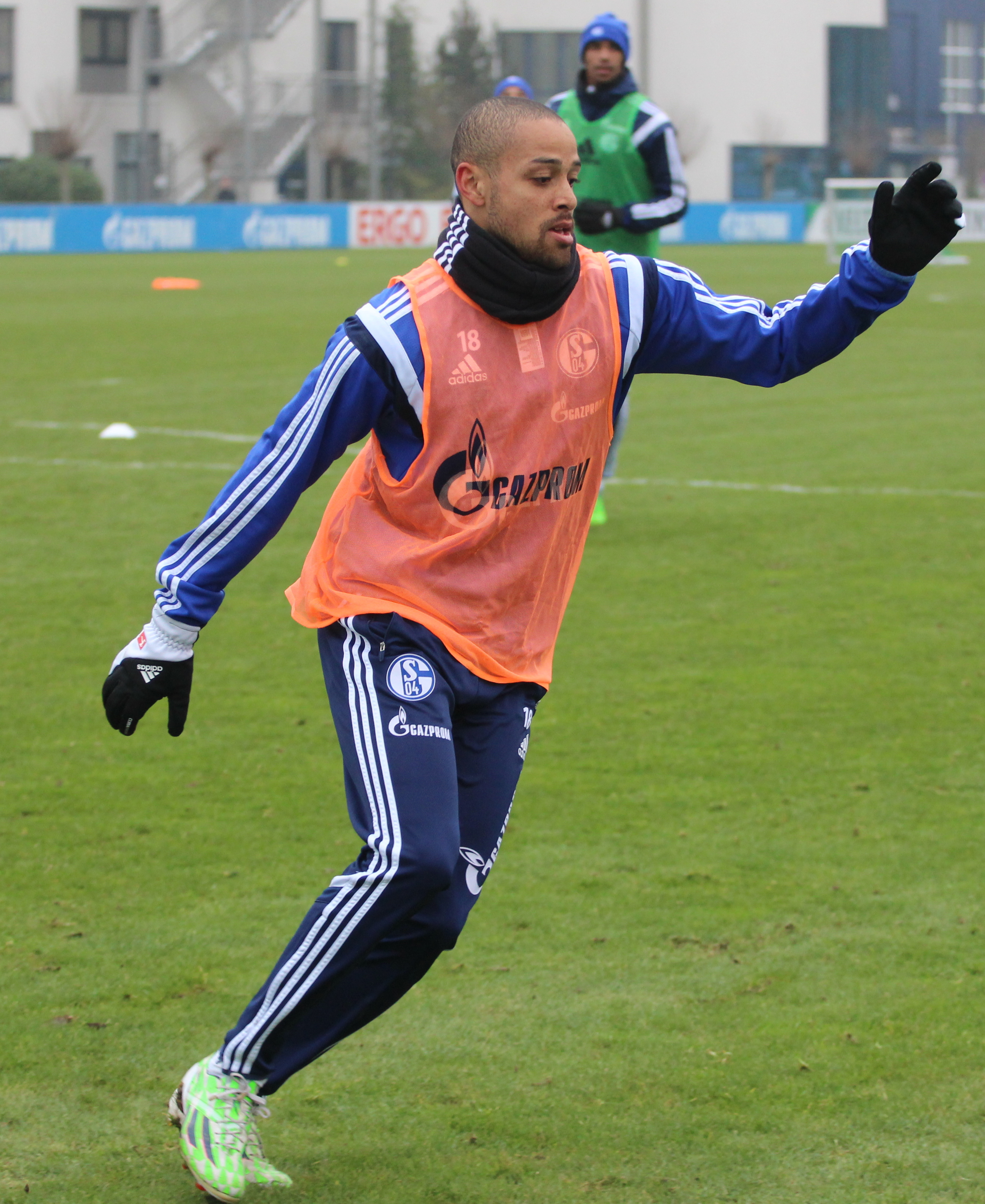
- Sam training with Schalke 04 in 2015

Personal information
- Full name: Sidney Sam
- Date of birth: 31 January 1988 (age 38)
- Place of birth: Kiel, West Germany
- Height: 1.74 m (5 ft 9 in)
- Positions: Forward; winger

Youth career
- 1995–2001: TuS Mettenhof
- 2001–2002: FC Kilia Kiel
- 2002–2004: Holstein Kiel
- 2004–2007: Hamburger SV

Senior career*
Years	Team	Apps	(Gls)
2006–2008	Hamburger SV II	47	(8)
2007–2010	Hamburger SV	4	(0)
2008–2010	→ 1. FC Kaiserslautern (loan)	59	(14)
2010–2014	Bayer Leverkusen	92	(24)
2014–2017	Schalke 04	13	(0)
2015–2016	→ Schalke 04 II	12	(3)
2017	→ Darmstadt 98 (loan)	13	(2)
2017–2019	VfL Bochum	42	(2)
2019–2020	Rheindorf Altach	21	(6)
2020–2021	Antalyaspor	25	(3)
Total		328	(62)

International career
2007	Germany U19	9	(2)
2007–2008	Germany U20	4	(0)
2009–2010	Germany U21	7	(1)
2013	Germany	5	(0)
Medal record
Bayer Leverkusen
Runner-up	Bundesliga	2011
- * Club domestic league appearances and goals

Sidney Sam (German pronunciation: [ˈzɪd.nɛː ˈzam]; born 31 January 1988) is a German former professional footballer who played as a forward or winger. He was known for his explosive speed and dribbling style.

== Club career ==
=== Early career ===
Sam started playing football at TuS Mettenhof. After that, Sam played at Kilia Kiel. In the summer of 2002, he signed for the city rivals of Kilia Kiel, Holstein Kiel.

At the beginning of the 2004–05 season, Sam moved on to the Hamburger SV youth system, and in 2006, he was promoted to the second team. In the 2007–08 season, he became part of the professional pool of Hamburg.

On 20 December 2007, Sam made his debut in the Bundesliga against VfB Stuttgart when he came on as a substitute for David Jarolím. He joined 1. FC Kaiserslautern on loan for the 2008–09 season and was loaned for another season on 1 July 2009.

=== Bayer Leverkusen ===
Sam then moved to Bayer Leverkusen in 2010 signing a five-year contract. He started off the season well and on 8 November 2010, he played against his former club 1. FC Kaiserslautern. Down 1–0, he started the comeback when he smashed a driven shot into the net. Patrick Helmes then completed the comeback as he made it 2–1. The day belonged to Sam as he smashed home a first time volley almost 25 meters out, stunned the entire stadium and made a name for himself that day while the goal was crowned Goal of the Month (Germany). On 17 February 2011, he scored a double in Bayer's UEFA Europa League match against Metalist Kharkiv, with both last-minute goals coming in added time.

=== Schalke 04 ===
On 8 January 2014, Sam signed a four-year contract with Schalke 04 running until 30 June 2018. He joined S04 for a transfer fee of €2,500,000 in June 2014, upon completion of the 2013–14 Bundesliga season. On 11 May 2015, he was suspended indefinitely from the club in the aftermath of a loss to 1. FC Köln.

==== Loan to Darmstadt 98 ====
In January 2017, Bundesliga club SV Darmstadt 98 announced that Sam has signed a loan agreement with the club until 30 June 2017.

=== Short spells at the end of his professional career ===
On 31 August 2017, VfL Bochum signed Sam on a two-year deal. On 2 October 2019, Sam signed a contract with Austrian club SCR Altach until the end of the 2019–20 season. His last professional club was Antalyaspor in Turkey.

=== Retirement ===
Sam announced his retirement from playing at the age of 33 in September 2021. Overall he played more than 220 matches in the first and second level of the German league pyramid. In December 2022 he started his coaching training with MSV Duisburg.

== International career ==
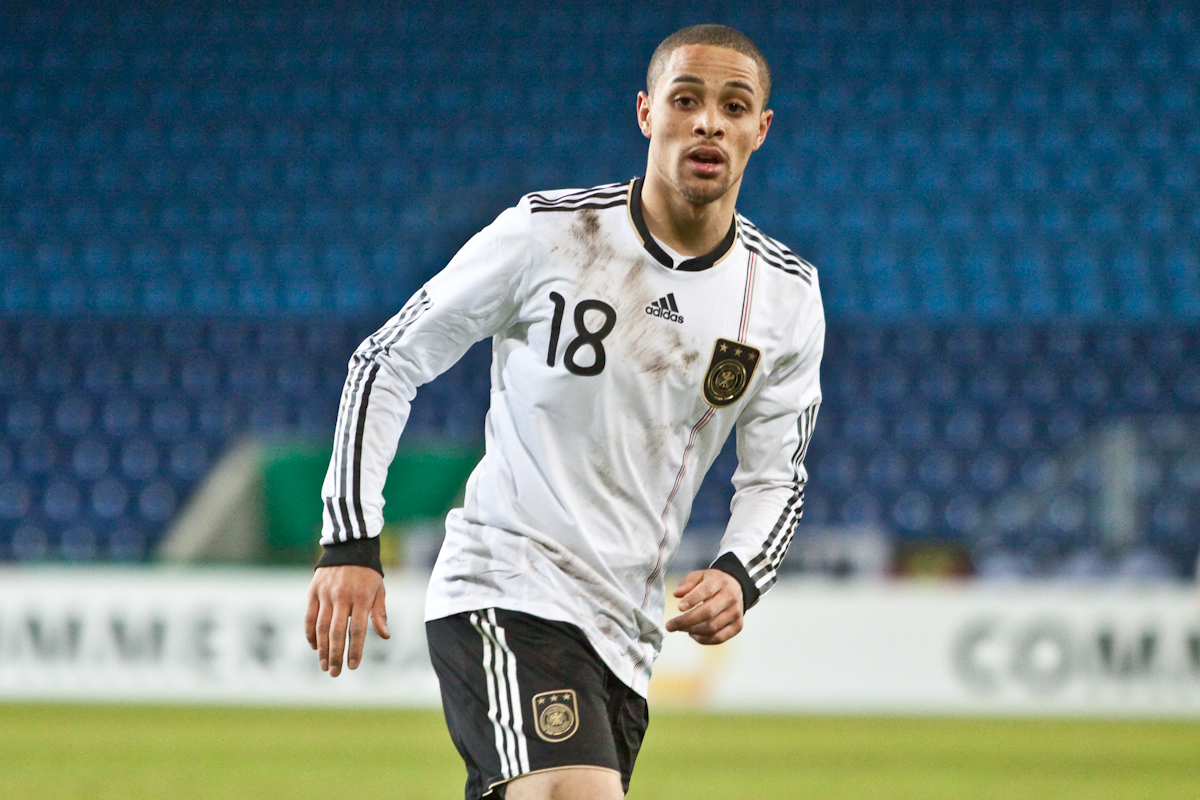
Sam playing for Germany U21 in 2010

Born to a German mother and Nigerian father, Sam would have been eligible to play for the Nigeria national team, but decided early on to represent his country of birth. He was a German youth national player, starring in Germany's under-19 and under-20 teams. On 29 May 2013, he made his senior international debut for Germany in a friendly game against Ecuador in Boca Raton, Florida. On 8 May 2014, Sam was named to the 30-man provisional squad for the 2014 FIFA World Cup by German national team manager, Joachim Löw. However, Sam didn't make the cut and his five internationals in 2013 became his final total with "Die Mannschaft."

== Style of play ==
Sam has been likened by observers in German football to the Dutch winger Arjen Robben of Bayern Munich, due to his explosive speed and dribbling style and possibly due to his frequent deployment on the right-wing and as an outside forward, cutting inside on his favoured left-foot to unleash his fierce shots, which leads to him scoring spectacular long-range goals. Sam is likened to a young Ryan Giggs, due to his ability to dribble with the ball at top speed. His comparison to Ryan Giggs and Arjen Robben is seen in the influence of the way he shoots and gets into goal-scoring situations coming in from both flanks on the football pitch. He utilizes his explosive speed by running-in-behind defenders and he is often as well deployed as an outside forward and striker.

== Career statistics ==
=== Club ===
Appearances and goals by club, season and competition
Club	Season	League			Cup		Continental		Other		Total	
Club	Season	League	Apps	Goals	Apps	Goals	Apps	Goals	Apps	Goals	Apps	Goals
Hamburger SV II	2005–06	Regionalliga Nord	2	1	—		—		—		2	1
Hamburger SV II	2006–07	Regionalliga Nord	23	4	—		—		—		23	4
Hamburger SV II	2007–08	Regionalliga Nord	21	3	—		—		—		21	3
Hamburger SV II	2008–09	Regionalliga Nord	1	0	—		—		—		1	0
Hamburger SV II	Total		47	8	0	0	0	0	0	0	47	8
Hamburger SV	2007–08	Bundesliga	4	0	0	0	1	0	—		5	0
Hamburger SV	2008–09	Bundesliga	0	0	0	0	0	0	—		0	0
Hamburger SV	Total		4	0	0	0	1	0	0	0	5	0
1. FC Kaiserslautern	2008–09	2. Bundesliga	26	4	0	0	—		—		26	4
1. FC Kaiserslautern	2009–10	2. Bundesliga	33	10	2	1	—		—		35	11
1. FC Kaiserslautern	Total		59	14	2	1	0	0	0	0	61	15
Bayer Leverkusen	2010–11	Bundesliga	30	7	2	2	8	3	—		40	12
Bayer Leverkusen	2011–12	Bundesliga	18	4	1	1	6	1	—		25	6
Bayer Leverkusen	2012–13	Bundesliga	22	5	2	0	3	0	—		28	5
Bayer Leverkusen	2013–14	Bundesliga	22	8	3	3	6	2	—		31	13
Bayer Leverkusen	Total		92	24	8	6	23	6	0	0	124	36
Schalke 04	2014–15	Bundesliga	11	0	1	0	3	0	—		15	0
Schalke 04	2015–16	Bundesliga	2	0	0	0	4	0	—		6	0
Schalke 04	2016–17	Bundesliga	0	0	0	0	1	0	—		1	0
Schalke 04	Total		13	0	1	0	8	0	0	0	22	0
Schalke 04 II	2014–15	Regionalliga West	1	0	—		—		—		1	0
Schalke 04 II	2015–16	Regionalliga West	2	1	—		—		—		2	1
Schalke 04 II	2016–17	Regionalliga West	9	2	—		—		—		9	2
Schalke 04 II	Total		12	3	0	0	0	0	0	0	12	3
Darmstadt 98	2016–17	Bundesliga	13	2	0	0	—		—		13	2
VfL Bochum	2017–18	2. Bundesliga	23	0	1	0	—		—		24	0
VfL Bochum	2018–19	2. Bundesliga	19	2	0	0	—		—		19	2
VfL Bochum	Total		42	2	1	0	0	0	0	0	43	2
SCR Altach	2019–20	Austrian Bundesliga	21	6	1	0	—		1 (Note: Appearance in Austrian Bundesliga play-offs)	0	23	6
Antalyaspor	2020–21	Süper Lig	25	3	5	0	—		–		30	3
Career total			328	62	18	7	32	6	1	0	379	75

=== International ===
As of 19 November 2013

Appearances and goals by national team and year
National team	Year	Apps	Goals
Germany	2013	5	0
Total		5	0
