= Damien Germanier =

Swiss football midfielder (born 1988)

Personal information
- Date of birth: 30 March 1988 (age 38)
- Place of birth: Sion, Switzerland
- Height: 1.78 m (5 ft 10 in)
- Position: Midfielder

Team information
- Current team: FC Echallens
- Number: 17

Youth career
- –2007: FC Sion

Senior career*
Years	Team	Apps	(Gls)
2006–2008	Sion II	32	(0)
2008–	FC Sion	1	(0)
2009–2010	→ FC Le Mont (loan)	2	(0)
2010–2011	→ Stade Nyonnais (loan)	31	(0)
2011–	→ FC Echallens (loan)		

International career
- Switzerland U17
- * Club domestic league appearances and goals as of 8 June 2008

Damien Germanier (born 30 March 1988 in Sion) is a Swiss football midfielder, who currently plays for FC Echallens on loan from FC Sion.

== Career ==
He began his career in the youth team of FC Sion and was promoted to the senior team in July 2007. In February 2009, he had a trial at FC La Chaux-de-Fonds, but later the loan deal was called off due to the player's military service.

On 14 March 2009, he made his debut for FC Sion in the Swiss Super League.

== International ==
He was a member of the Swiss under-17 team at 2005 UEFA European Under-17 Football Championship.

Germanier is former U-18 national player from Switzerland
