= Hakan Özmert =

Turkish footballer (born 1985)

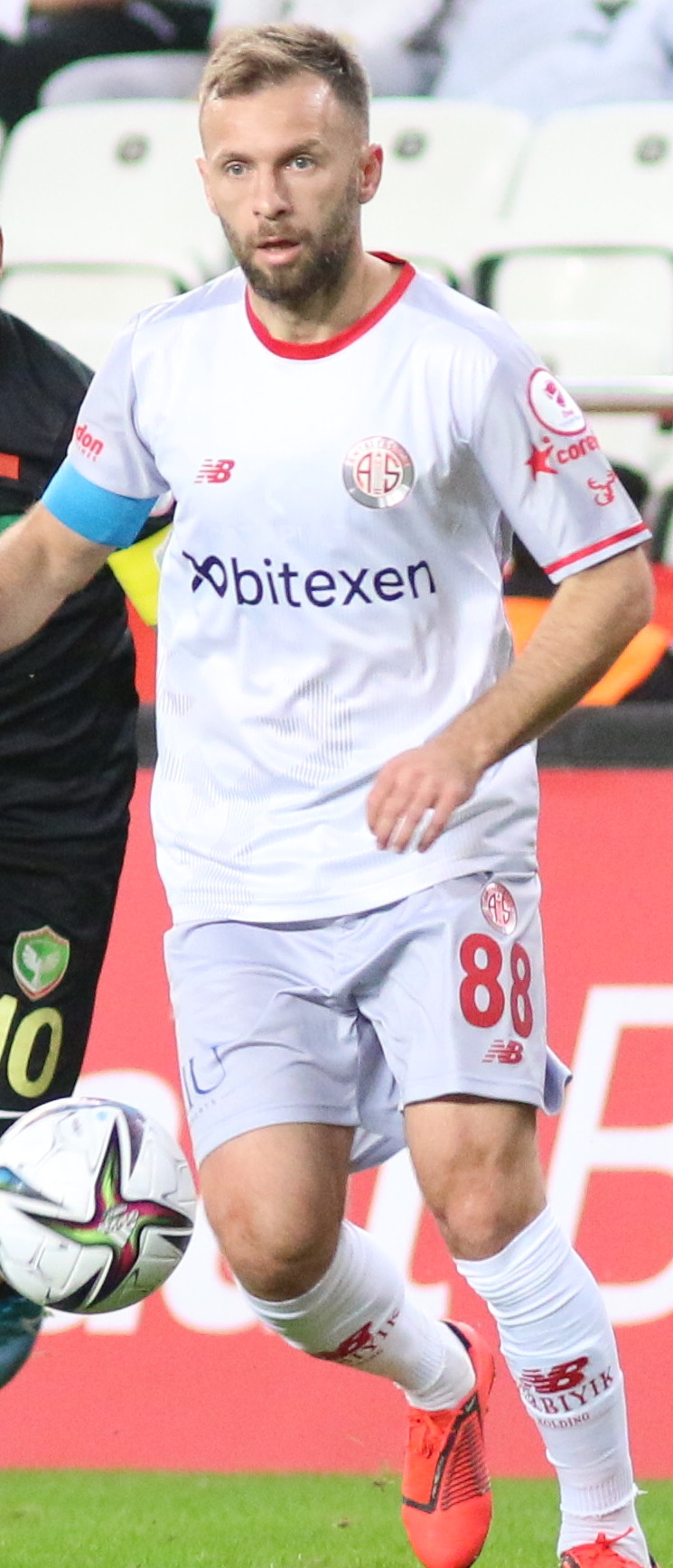
- Özmert playing for Antalyaspor in 2021

Personal information
- Full name: Hakan Özmert
- Date of birth: 3 June 1985 (age 41)
- Place of birth: Nantes, France
- Height: 1.83 m (6 ft 0 in)
- Positions: Central midfielder; right wing

Team information
- Current team: Fenerbahçe (assistant manager)

Youth career
- 1991–1998: FC Nantes
- 1998–2003: Akyazıspor

Senior career*
Years	Team	Apps	(Gls)
2003–2007	Sakaryaspor	52	(1)
2005	→ Karşıyaka (loan)	12	(1)
2007–2010	Antalyaspor	62	(6)
2010–2011	Karabükspor	31	(3)
2011–2012	Orduspor	29	(2)
2012–2013	Kasımpaşa	10	(1)
2013–2015	Karabükspor	49	(1)
2015–2016	Sivasspor	7	(0)
2016–2018	İstanbul Başakşehir	19	(2)
2018–2023	Antalyaspor	129	(9)
2023	Bodrumspor	14	(2)
2023–2024	Sarıyer	21	(1)

International career
2001	Turkey U16	2	(0)
2002–2003	Turkey U18	10	(1)
2003–2004	Turkey U19	13	(1)
- * Club domestic league appearances and goals

Hakan Özmert (born 3 June 1985) is a former professional footballer and currently assistant manager of Turkish Süper Lig club Fenerbahçe under Emre Belözoğlu management. Born in France, he represents Turkey internationally.

== Club career ==
He started his career with FC Nantes in France, also Özmert began his professional career with Sakaryaspor, and appeared in 26 Süper Lig matches for the club. In 2005, he was loaned out to Karşıyaka and made a permanent move to Antalyaspor in July 2007. On 4 July 2015, Özmert signed for Sivasspor.

In his professional career, he played for Sakaryaspor, Karşıyaka (loan), Antalyaspor, Karabükspor, Orduspor, Kasımpaşa, Karabükspor, Sivasspor, İstanbul Başakşehir, Antalyaspor, Bodrumspor and Sarıyer.

== International career ==
Although born in France, Özmert has exclusively represented Turkey in youth competitions. He has played for the Turkish U16s, U18s, and U19s.

== Managing career ==
After retiring from football, he served as an assistant manager at Antalyaspor and Kasımpaşa alongside Emre Belözoğlu.

On 3 November 2026, Emre Belözoğlu was appointed head coach of Fenerbahçe and Özmert also appointed as assistant manager.

== Achievements ==
Sakaryaspor (2003–2007)

- Second League Category A: 2004, 2006

Antalyaspor (2007–2010)

- 1. Lig runner-up: 2007–08

İstanbul Başakşehir (2016–2018)

- Süper Lig runner-up: 2018–19

Antalyaspor (2018–2023)

- Turkish Cup runner-up: 2020–21
