= Eren Albayrak =

Turkish footballer (born 1991)

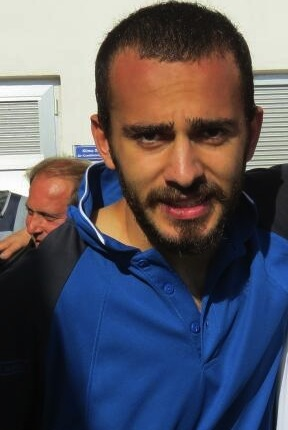

Personal information
- Full name: Eren Albayrak
- Date of birth: 23 April 1991 (age 35)
- Place of birth: Istanbul, Turkey
- Height: 1.75 m (5 ft 9 in)
- Position: Left back

Team information
- Current team: Bodrumspor
- Number: 16

Youth career
- 2004–2008: Bursaspor

Senior career*
Years	Team	Apps	(Gls)
2007–2011	Bursaspor	7	(0)
2011–2013	Trabzonspor	0	(0)
2012	→ Orduspor (loan)	1	(0)
2012–2013	→ 1461 Trabzon (loan)	12	(2)
2013–2016	Çaykur Rizespor	83	(7)
2016–2017	İstanbul Başakşehir	24	(0)
2017–2018	Konyaspor	11	(0)
2018–2019	Júbilo Iwata	11	(0)
2019–2022	Antalyaspor	53	(1)
2022–2023	Çaykur Rizespor	11	(0)
2023–	Bodrumspor	13	(0)

International career
2006	Turkey U15	2	(0)
2006–2007	Turkey U16	27	(3)
2006–2008	Turkey U17	27	(5)
2008–2009	Turkey U18	12	(0)
2008–2009	Turkey U19	20	(3)
2009–2012	Turkey U21	4	(2)
2015	Turkey	1	(0)
- * Club domestic league appearances and goals as of 12 June 2024, 21:05 (UTC)

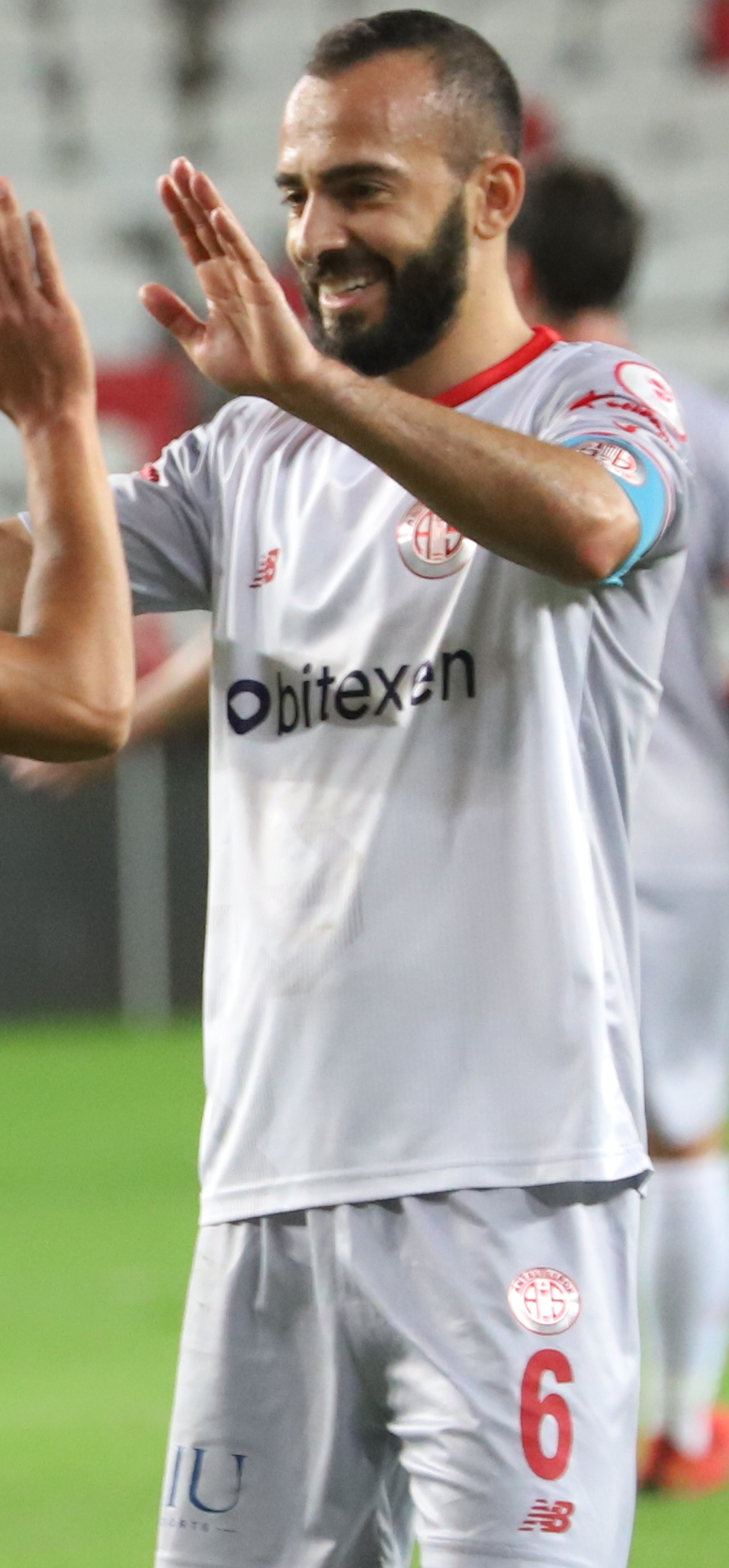
Albayrak in 2021 with Antalyaspor jersey

Eren Albayrak (born 23 April 1991) is a Turkish professional footballer who plays as a left back for TFF First League club Bodrumspor. He has represented Turkey at all youth levels and currently has 92 youth caps.

== Career statistics ==
As of 11 November 2023.

Appearances and goals by club, season and competition
Club	Season	League	League		National cup		League Cup		Continental		Other		Total	
Club	Season	League	Apps	Goals	Apps	Goals	Apps	Goals	Apps	Goals	Apps	Goals	Apps	Goals
Bursaspor	2006–07	Süper Lig	0	0	0	0	—		—		—		0	0
Bursaspor	2007–08	Süper Lig	2	0	1	0	—		—		—		3	0
Bursaspor	2008–09	Süper Lig	4	0	2	1	—		—		—		6	1
Bursaspor	2009–10	Süper Lig	1	0	1	0	—		—		—		2	0
Bursaspor	2010–11	Süper Lig	0	0	0	0	—		0	0	0	0	0	0
Bursaspor	Total		7	0	4	1	—		0	0	0	0	11	1
Orduspor (loan)	2011–12	Süper Lig	1	0	1	0	—		—		—		2	0
1461 Trabzon (loan)	2012–13	1. Lig	12	2	3	1	—		—		—		15	3
Çaykur Rizespor	2012–13	1. Lig	15	4	—		—		—		—		15	4
Çaykur Rizespor	2013–14	Süper Lig	16	1	0	0	—		—		—		16	1
Çaykur Rizespor	2014–15	Süper Lig	31	2	4	0	—		—		—		35	2
Çaykur Rizespor	2015–16	Süper Lig	21	0	6	0	—		—		—		27	0
Çaykur Rizespor	Total		83	7	10	0	—		—		—		93	7
İstanbul Başakşehir	2016–17	Süper Lig	24	0	5	0	—		3	0	—		32	0
Konyaspor	2017–18	Süper Lig	11	0	2	0	—		0	0	—		13	0
Júbilo Iwata	2018	J1 League	4	0	0	0	—		—		0	0	4	0
Júbilo Iwata	2019	J1 League	7	0	1	0	6	0	—		—		14	0
Júbilo Iwata	Total		11	0	1	0	6	0	—		—		18	0
Antalyaspor	2019–20	Süper Lig	14	0	4	0	—		—		—		18	0
Antalyaspor	2020–21	Süper Lig	33	1	5	0	—		—		—		38	1
Antalyaspor	2021–22	Süper Lig	6	0	3	0	—		—		1	0	10	0
Antalyaspor	Total		53	1	12	0	—		—		1	0	66	1
Çaykur Rizespor	2021–22	Süper Lig	11	0	—		—		—		—		11	0
Çaykur Rizespor	2022–23	1. Lig	0	0	0	0	—		—		—		0	0
Çaykur Rizespor	Total		11	0	0	0	—		—		—		11	0
Bodrumspor	2022–23	1. Lig	4	0	—		—		—		3	0	7	0
Bodrumspor	2023–24	1. Lig	6	0	0	0	—		—		0	0	6	0
Bodrumspor	Total		10	0	0	0	—		—		3	0	13	0
Career total			223	10	38	2	6	0	3	0	4	0	274	12

== Honours ==
Bursaspor

- Süper Lig: 2009–10
