= Gil Cain =

Israeli professional football player

Gil Cain גיל קין
Personal information
- Full name: Gil Cain
- Date of birth: March 5, 1988 (age 38)
- Place of birth: Brazil
- Height: 1.78 m (5 ft 10 in)
- Position: Center back

Team information
- Current team: Maccabi Kabilio Jaffa

Youth career
- 1995–2001: Maccabi Tel Aviv
- 2001–2003: Hakoah Ramat Gan
- 2003–2007: Maccabi Tel Aviv

Senior career*
Years	Team	Apps	(Gls)
2007–2009	Hapoel Kfar Saba	15	(0)
2009	Sektzia Ness Ziona	10	(0)
2009–2010	Hapoel Marmorek	28	(0)
2010–2011	Beitar Shimshon Tel Aviv	26	(0)
2011–2013	Hakoah Amidar Ramat Gan	43	(0)
2013–2017	Maccabi Kabilio Jaffa	81	(0)
2017–2019	Hapoel Azor	54	(0)
2019–2020	Maccabi Kabilio Jaffa	19	(1)
2021–2022	Maccabi HaShikma Ramat Hen	10	(0)

International career
2004–2005	Israel U17	13	(0)
2006	Israel U18	3	(0)
2006–2007	Israel U19	18	(0)
- * Club domestic league appearances and goals as of 1 June 2022

Gil Cain (Hebrew: גיל קין; born March 5, 1988, in Brazil) is an Israeli professional footballer who is currently contracted with Maccabi Kabilio Jaffa. Local media outlets considered him to be a future star for that team.

== Playing career ==
At the age of seven, Cain joined the youth system of Maccabi Tel Aviv. At the age of thirteen, he left Maccabi to join Hakoah Maccabi Ramat Gan but returned to "the yellows" two years later. During this time, he played for numerous Israeli national youth football teams. In 2006, Cain could have joined the full side for Maccabi, but instead played with the under-21 side in the national under-21 league. When he realised that his chances of breaking into the lineup were slim, he decided to leave the club. Gabby Ketzara, chairman of Hapoel Kfar Saba, was quick to ask manager Eli Ohana to give Cain a trial. After watching Cain play, Ohana signed him to a contract for three years with "the greens of the Sharon region."

Cain made his first team debut against Maccabi Haifa, coming in as a substitute for veteran Ofer Talker in the twenty-third minute of the match with Kfar Saba down two-nil. His debut was marred by his scoring an own goal in ninetieth minute, and Kfar Saba losing 3–0 to Haifa.

== Personal life ==
Two weeks after Cain was born, he was adopted by Miron and Pnina Cain, lawyers from Ramat Ef'al, a suburb of Ramat Gan. His brother was also adopted, having been born in Romania.
