= Guy Hadani =

Israeli footballer (born 1988)

Guy Hadani גיא הדני
Personal information
- Date of birth: 24 May 1988 (age 38)
- Place of birth: Tel Aviv, Israel
- Position: Goalkeeper

Youth career
- Maccabi Tel Aviv

Senior career*
Years	Team	Apps	(Gls)
2006–2010	Maccabi Tel Aviv	0	(0)
2007–2009	→ Hapoel Marmorek	7	(0)

International career
2004–2005	Israel U-17	9	(0)
2007	Israel U-19	4	(0)
- * Club domestic league appearances and goals

Guy Hadani (Hebrew: גיא הדני; born 24 May 1988) is an Israeli former footballer who played for Maccabi Tel Aviv and Hapoel Marmorek.

== Career ==
Hadani was brought up through the ranks of Maccabi Tel Aviv and joined the senior team as a third goalkeeper in 2006, while still playing as starting goalkeeper for the club's youth team. In 2007–08 and 2008–09 Hadani was loaned to Hapoel Marmorek, but played only a handful of matches, as he was conscripted to the Israel Defense Forces.

Hadani returned to Maccabi Tel Aviv's squad for the 2009–10 season, but didn't play any match. He quit football at the end of the season.

Hadani represented Israel with the national U-19 team and U-17 team and was part of the U-17 team in the 2005 UEFA European Under-17 Championship, playing in two of the team's matches in the championship.
