= Erman Vardar =

Swedish footballer

Personal information
- Full name: Erman Herman Vardar
- Date of birth: 14 December 2001 (age 24)
- Place of birth: Skövde, Sweden
- Height: 1.70 m (5 ft 7 in)
- Position: Forward

Youth career
- 2012–2015: Şimşek Gençlik
- 2015–2016: Antalyaspor
- 2016–2017: Şimşek Gençlik
- 2017–2019: Antalyaspor

Senior career*
Years	Team	Apps	(Gls)
2019–2021	Antalyaspor	1	(0)
2019	→ Serik Belediyespor (loan)	1	(0)
2020	→ BB Bodrumspor (loan)	1	(0)
2021	Somaspor	3	(0)
2021–2022	Kastamonu Özel Idare	17	(1)
- * Club domestic league appearances and goals as of 17:50, 20 September 2022 (UTC)

Erman Herman Vardar (born 14 December 2001) is a Swedish footballer of Turkish origin, who plays as a forward.

== Career ==
Vardar made his professional debut for Antalyaspor in a 3-0 Süper Lig win over Yeni Malatyaspor on 18 May 2019.

On September 3, 2019, he has signed with Serik Belediyespor for a season long loan deal.

On 2 February 2021, it was confirmed that Vardar had joined TFF Third League side Somaspor.
