= Ali Eren İyican =

Turkish footballer (born 1999)

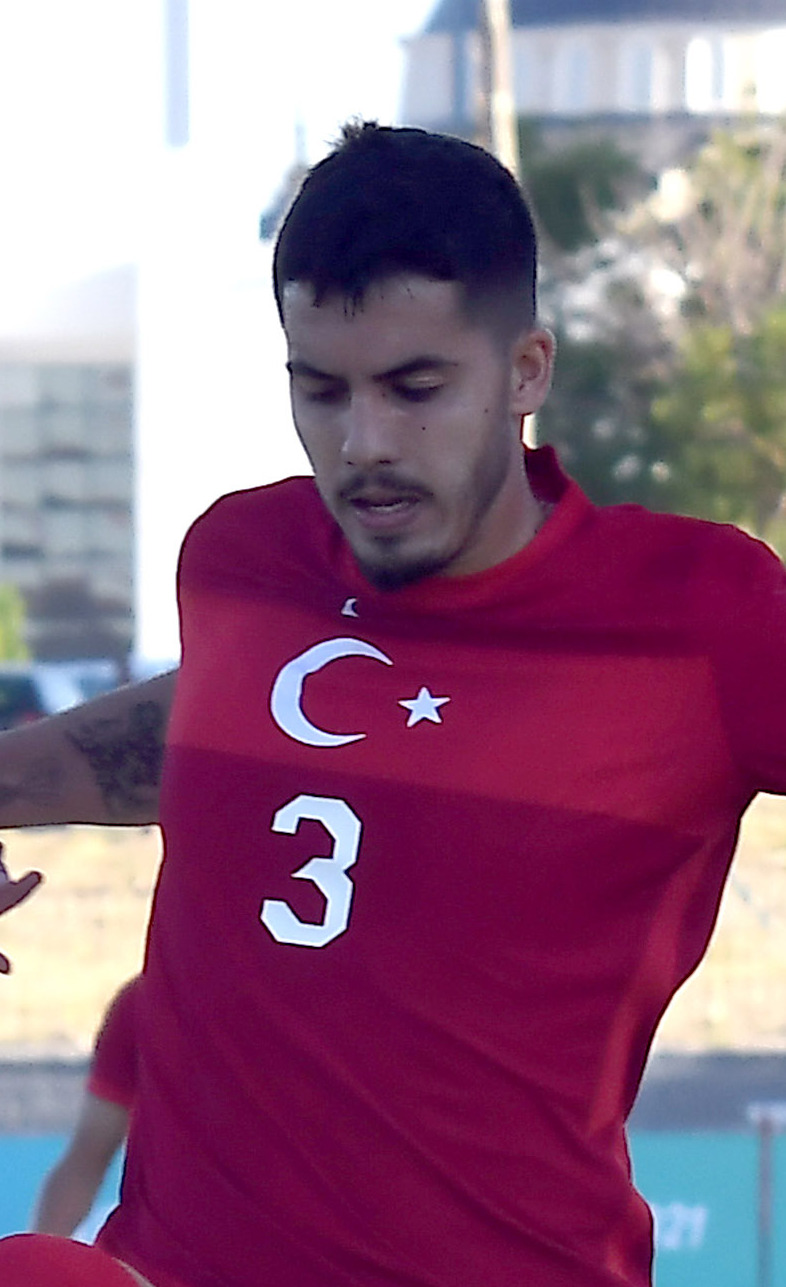
- İyican in 2022

Personal information
- Full name: Ali Eren İyican
- Date of birth: 26 June 1999 (age 27)
- Place of birth: Mersin, Turkey
- Height: 1.75 m (5 ft 9 in)
- Position: Defender

Team information
- Current team: Beyoğlu Yeni Çarşı
- Number: 75

Youth career
- 2008–2010: Ankaraspor
- 2010–2011: Bugsaşspor
- 2014–2017: Ankaraspor

Senior career*
| Years | Team | Apps | (Gls) |
| 2017–2020 | Ankaraspor | 41 | (0) |
| 2020–2021 | Antalyaspor | 8 | (0) |
| 2021–2025 | Bodrum | 26 | (0) |
| 2022–2023 | → 1461 Trabzon (loan) | 13 | (0) |
| 2024–2025 | → Beykoz Anadolu (loan) | 24 | (0) |
| 2025– | Beyoğlu Yeni Çarşı | 8 | (0) |

International career^{‡}
| 2018 | Turkey U19 | 1 | (0) |
| 2022 | Turkey U23 | 2 | (0) |
Medal record
Men's football
Representing Turkey
Islamic Solidarity Games
| Gold medal – first place | 2021 Konya |
- * Club domestic league appearances and goals as of 30 November 2025 ‡ National team caps and goals as of 06:28, 2 February 2023 (UTC)

Ali Eren İyican (born 26 June 1999) is a Turkish professional footballer who plays as a defender for TFF 2. Lig club Beyoğlu Yeni Çarşı.

== Career ==
A youth product of Osmanlıspor, İyican made his professional debut in a 3-1 Turkish Cup win over Yeni Malatyaspor on 28 November 2017. He made his league debut in a 2-1 Süper Lig loss to Akhisarspor on 18 May 2018.

== International career ==
İyican represented the Turkey U23s in their winning campaign at the 2021 Islamic Solidarity Games.

== Honours ==
Turkey U23

- Islamic Solidarity Games: 2021
