= Davide Redzepi =

Swiss footballer (born 1988)

Personal information
- Full name: Davide Redzepi
- Date of birth: 15 January 1988 (age 38)
- Place of birth: Switzerland
- Height: 1.87 m (6 ft 1 1/2 in)
- Position: Defender

Team information
- Current team: FC Locarno
- Number: 24

Senior career*
| Years | Team | Apps | (Gls) |
| 2006–2007 | BSC Young Boys | 1 | (0) |
| 2007 | AC Bellinzona | 4 | (0) |
| 2008–2009 | SR Delémont | 2 | (0) |
| 2009– | FC Locarno | | |

International career
| | Switzerland U-18 | 6 | (0) |
- * Club domestic league appearances and goals as of 28 February 2008

Davide Redzepi (born 15 January 1988) is a Swiss footballer who plays as defender for FC Locarno.
