= Nuri Şahin =

Turkish football manager (born 1988)

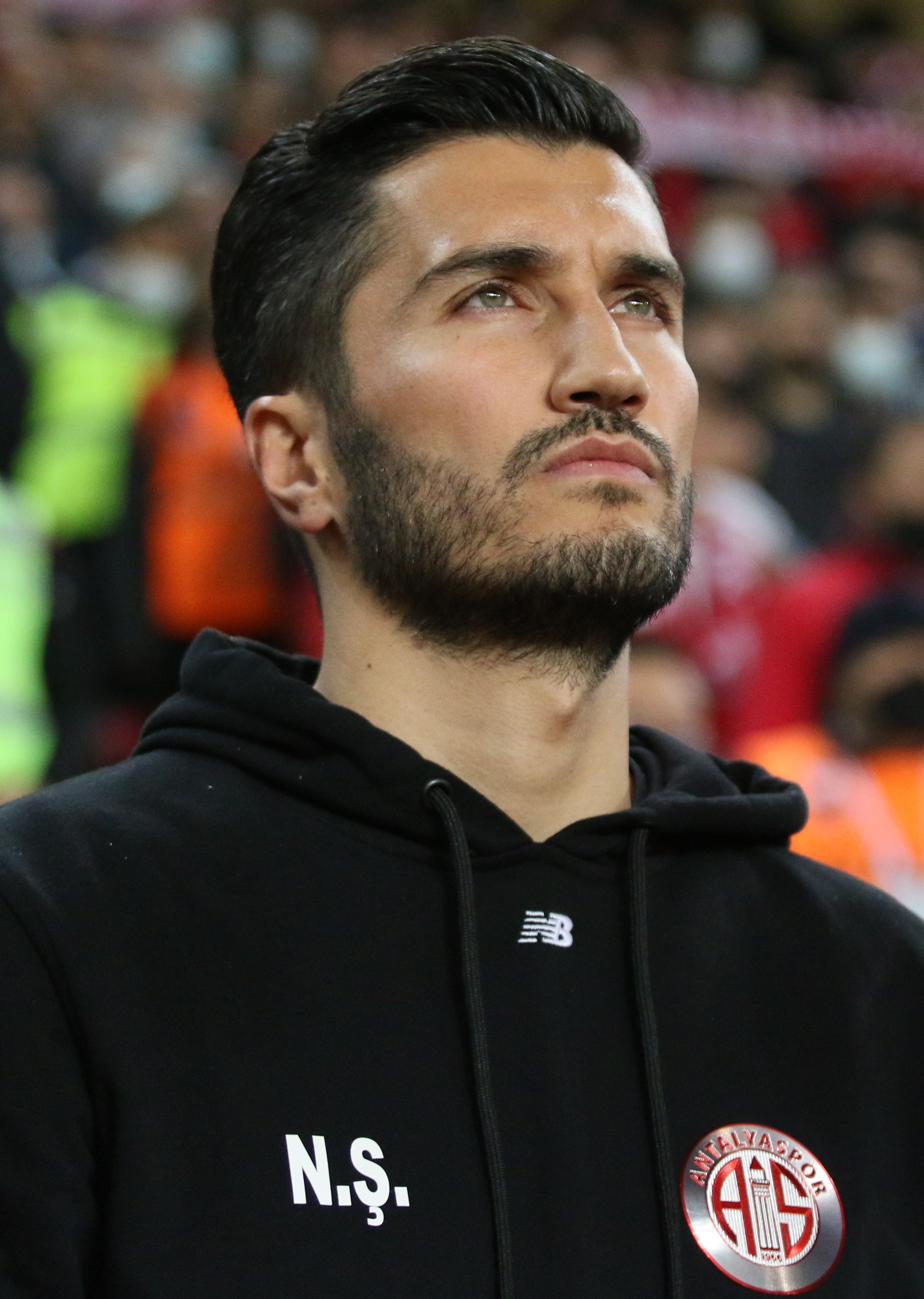
- Şahin with Antalyaspor in 2021

Personal information
- Full name: Nuri Kazım Şahin
- Date of birth: 5 September 1988 (age 38)
- Place of birth: Lüdenscheid, West Germany
- Height: 1.80 m (5 ft 11 in)
- Position: Midfielder

Team information
- Current team: Başakşehir (head coach)

Youth career
- 1994–2001: RSV Meinerzhagen
- 2001–2005: Borussia Dortmund

Senior career*
Years	Team	Apps	(Gls)
2005–2008	Borussia Dortmund II	5	(1)
2005–2011	Borussia Dortmund	135	(13)
2007–2008	→ Feyenoord (loan)	29	(6)
2011–2014	Real Madrid	4	(0)
2012–2013	→ Liverpool (loan)	7	(1)
2013–2014	→ Borussia Dortmund (loan)	49	(5)
2014–2018	Borussia Dortmund	39	(3)
2018–2020	Werder Bremen	36	(1)
2020–2021	Antalyaspor	44	(0)
Total		348	(30)

International career
2003	Turkey U16	2	(0)
2004–2005	Turkey U17	21	(5)
2004–2005	Turkey U19	6	(0)
2007–2008	Turkey U21	11	(4)
2005–2017	Turkey	52	(2)

Managerial career
- 2021–2023: Antalyaspor
- 2024–2025: Borussia Dortmund
- 2025–: Başakşehir
Medal record
Men's football
Representing Turkey
UEFA European Under-17 Championship
Winner	2005 Italy
FIFA U-17 World Championship
Third place	2005 Peru
- * Club domestic league appearances and goals

Nuri Kazım Şahin (born 5 September 1988) is a German and Turkish professional football manager and former player who played as a midfielder. He is currently the head coach of Süper Lig club Başakşehir.

He began his playing career at Dortmund, spending six years there – including a year-long loan at Feyenoord – and winning the Bundesliga in 2011 before signing for Real Madrid in 2011 for €10 million. In August 2012, Şahin agreed to a one-year loan deal with Liverpool, which was terminated in January 2013 to allow him to return to Dortmund on an 18-month loan. This was then made permanent, and he stayed at Dortmund until his transfer to Werder Bremen in August 2018. He retired from football in 2021, after one season at Antalyaspor in the Süper Lig.

Born in Germany, Şahin represented Turkey at international level and did so since the under-16 level. He made his senior international debut in 2005 and earned 52 caps over a 12-year career, being selected for UEFA Euro 2016.

After retiring as a player, Şahin began managing Antalyaspor in 2021, later leading Dortmund but getting sacked on 22 January 2025.

== Personal life ==
Şahin was born to Turkish parents in Lüdenscheid and grew up in nearby Meinerzhagen. He became a German citizen in 2011. He has been married to his cousin Tuğba Şahin (née Emeni) since November 2007. In September 2011, she gave birth to a son, Ömer, in Madrid. Şahin is fluent in five languages: Turkish, German, English, Dutch and Spanish. In April 2018, Şahin enrolled at Harvard Business School. Şahin is Muslim.

== Club career ==
=== Early career ===
Şahin began his football career at the age of six for RSV Meinerzhagen. After spending seven seasons at the club, he was signed by professional club Borussia Dortmund in 2001.

=== Borussia Dortmund ===
On 6 August 2005, at the age of 16 years and 334 days, Şahin set a record by becoming the youngest player to have played in the Bundesliga (this was later surpassed by Youssoufa Moukoko on 21 November 2020 at the age of 16 years and 1 day). On 25 November of the same year, Şahin became the youngest player to score a goal in the Bundesliga, scoring for Borussia Dortmund against 1. FC Nürnberg (this was later surpassed by Florian Wirtz on 6 June 2020 at the age of 17 years and 34 days).

On 5 July 2007, Şahin was transferred to Feyenoord in the Eredivisie on a one-year loan agreement, where he was reunited with Bert van Marwijk, his former coach at Borussia Dortmund.

Şahin returned to Dortmund, where he played an important role in the 2009–10 season, starting 33 out of 34 matches. He ended the season with four goals and eight assists. Şahin won the Bundesliga title with Dortmund in the 2010–11 season. After a strong season, in which he scored six goals and had eight assists, he was voted the Bundesliga player of the season.

=== Real Madrid ===
On 9 May 2011, after weeks of speculation, Şahin announced his departure from Dortmund in a press room at Signal Iduna Park, and soon after signed a six-year contract with Spanish club Real Madrid. The transfer fee paid to Dortmund amounted to €10 million. He stated the main reason to join them was because of José Mourinho, and the chance of playing for a club as prestigious as Real Madrid. He made his official debut as a substitute in a 7–1 thrashing of Osasuna at the Santiago Bernabéu on 6 November 2011, as he had been sidelined by injury problems since August earlier that year. On 20 December, he scored his first goal for Real Madrid as they thrashed Ponferradina 5–1 in the Copa del Rey. On 27 March 2012, he was named in the starting XI to face APOEL in the UEFA Champions League quarter-final, where his performance was praised by various newspapers.

==== Liverpool (loan) ====
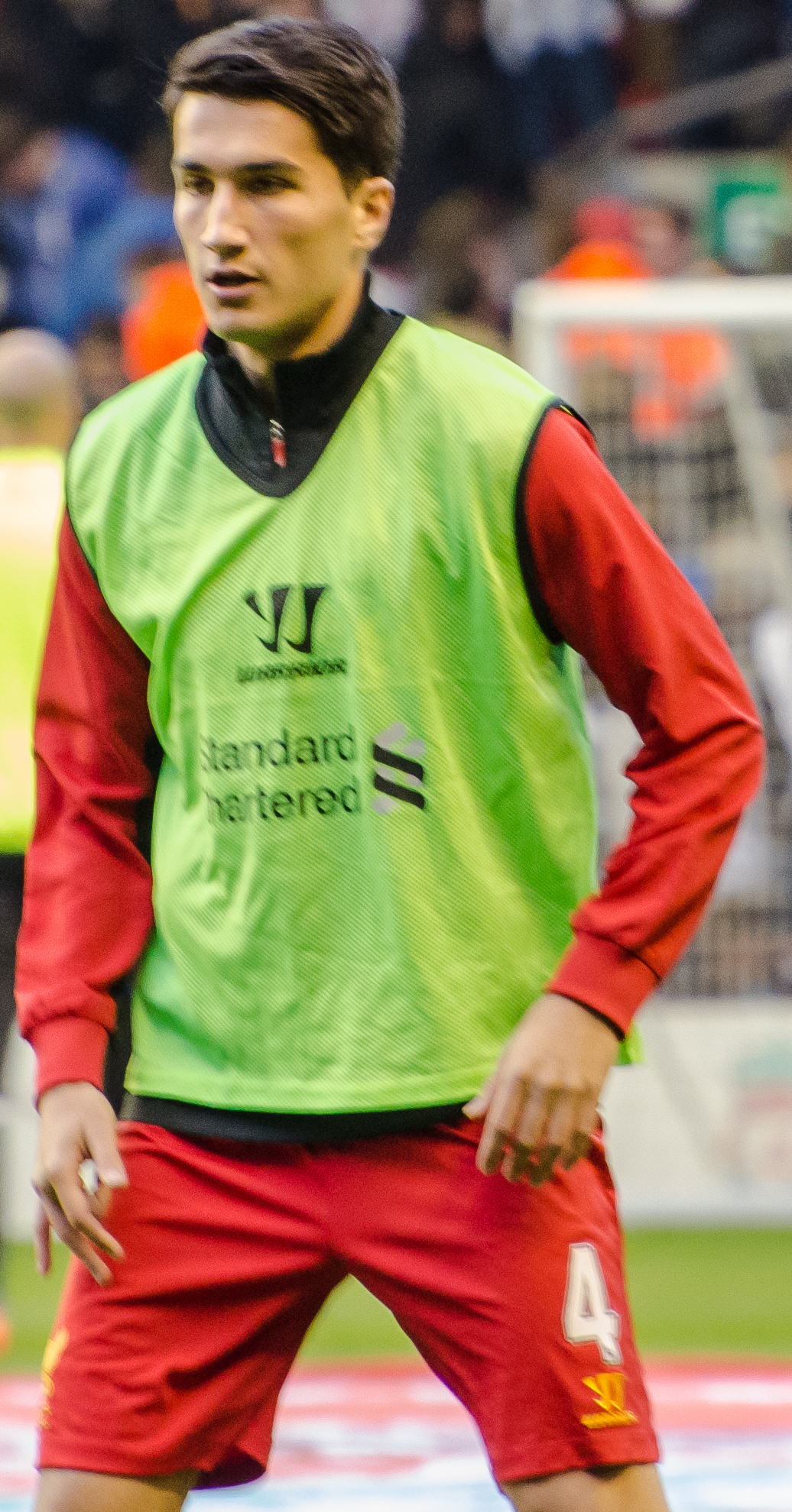
Şahin with Liverpool in 2012

On 25 August 2012, Real Madrid agreed to loan Şahin to Liverpool on a season-long deal, where he was given the number 4 shirt. On 2 September 2012, Şahin made his Liverpool debut in the 2–0 home defeat to Arsenal in the Premier League. On 26 September, Şahin scored his first and second goal for Liverpool in the third round of the League Cup against West Bromwich Albion as the game ended in a 2–1 win. Three days later, he scored his first Premier League goal and set up two goals in a 5–2 win against Norwich City. In his five-month loan spell at Liverpool, Şahin managed to get three goals and three assists in 12 matches. After leaving Liverpool, Şahin said he was never happy at either Real Madrid or Liverpool, though he was happy to get a chance to play with captain Steven Gerrard.

=== Return to Borussia Dortmund ===
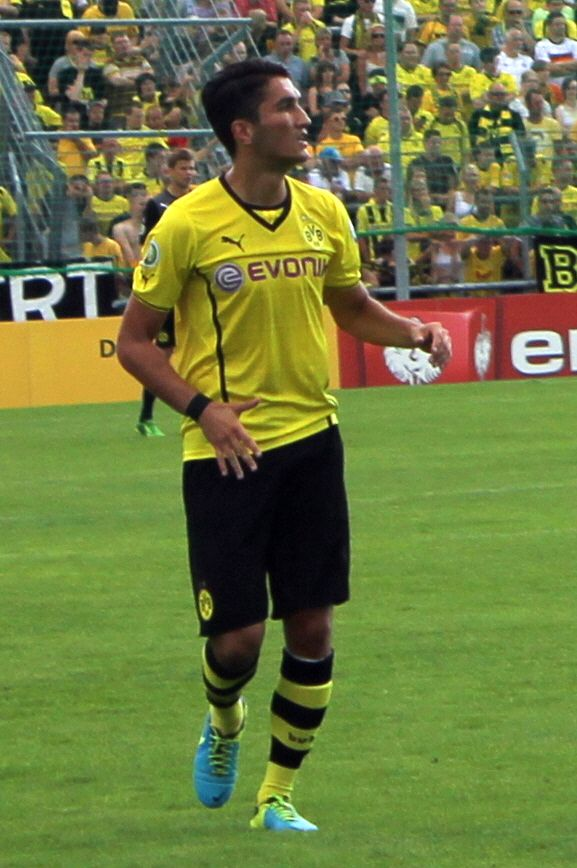
Şahin with Borussia Dortmund in 2013

On 14 January 2013, Liverpool announced that they had in agreement with all parties terminated the loan agreement with Real Madrid and Şahin, and that this would now allow Şahin to join Borussia Dortmund on loan until the end of the 2013–14 season. Şahin spoke about the deal saying, "I realised that as a footballer and a human being, I belong here 100 per cent." Şahin also said "I noticed quickly that I only want to play for Dortmund." His return move delighted manager Jürgen Klopp. Prior his debut in the friendly match against Mainz, in which Dortmund won on penalties, Şahin said he was quite nervous for his return. Eight days later, he made his first league appearance, since leaving Dortmund, coming on as a substitute in a later minute, as Dortmund defeated Werder Bremen 5–0. On 16 March 2013, Şahin scored two goals in a 5–1 Dortmund victory over SC Freiburg.

On 27 July 2013, Şahin won the 2013 DFL-Supercup with Dortmund 4–2 against rivals Bayern Munich. On 26 October 2013, Şahin scored a goal for Dortmund in the Revierderby against rivals Schalke in a 3–1 win for Dortmund.

On 10 April 2014, Borussia Dortmund activated a clause in Sahin's contract that allowed him to return permanently for a fee reported to be in the region of €7 million.

The preparation for the 2014–15 season was marked by injuries; he was sidelined early on due to an irritation in the joint capsule of his knee and tendinitis. In September 2014, inflamed tissue was removed from Sahin's left knee. After the surgery, he was out for around nine weeks, and returned to team practice on 12 November 2014. After playing seven league games, Şahin was diagnosed with tendon irritation in the upper adductor area in March 2015, whereupon he was sidelined for the rest of the season and for the entire first half of the 2015–16 season.

After a break of almost a year, he made his comeback in the UEFA Europa League game against Porto on 18 February 2016. After İlkay Gündoğan's move to Manchester City, Şahin received his old shirt number 8 back.

On 25 April 2017, Şahin extended his contract with Dortmund by another year until 2019.

=== Werder Bremen ===
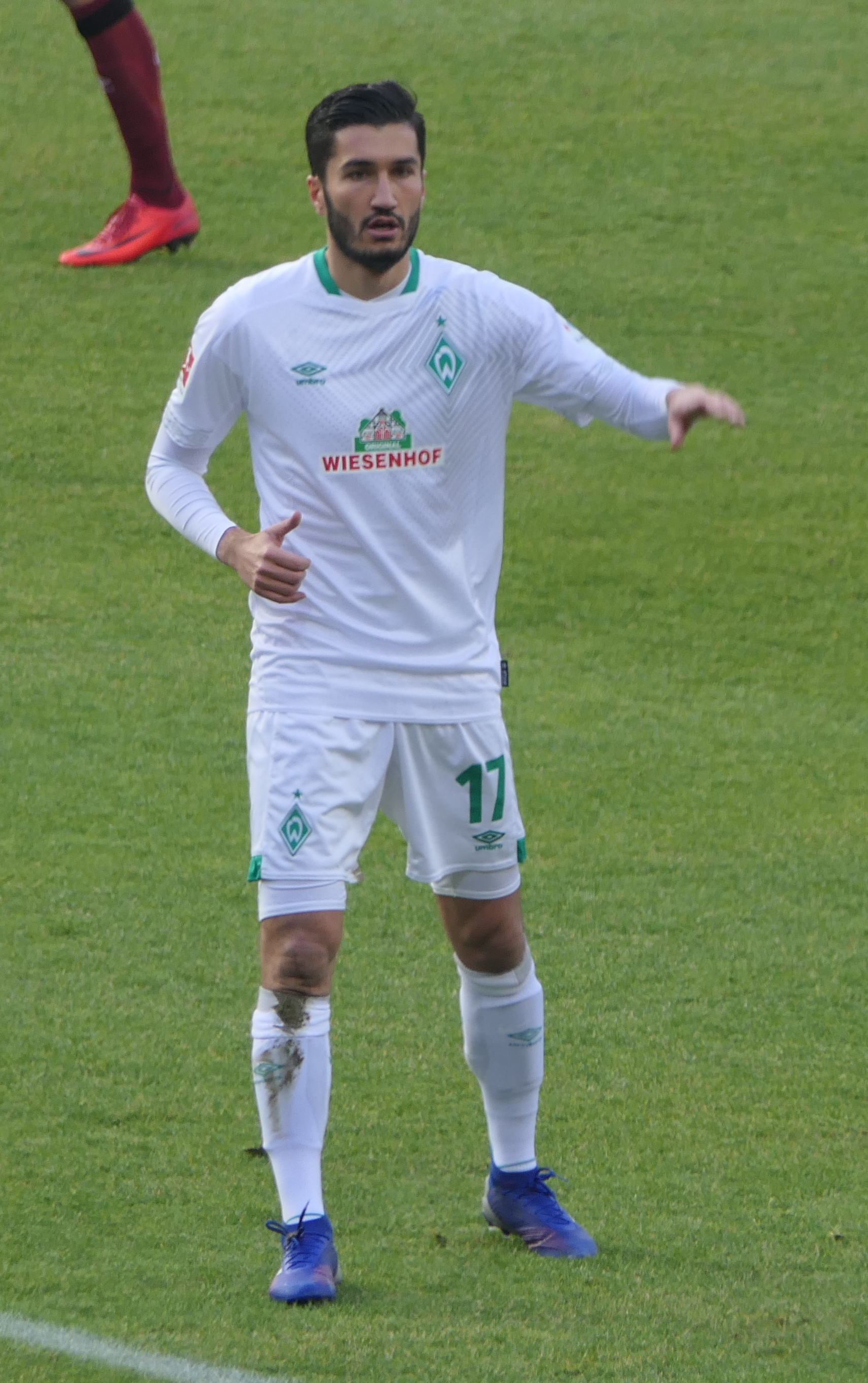
Şahin with Werder Bremen in 2019

On 31 August 2018, the last day of the 2018 summer transfer window, Şahin joined Bundesliga rivals Werder Bremen. According to media reports, he signed a two-year contract moving to the club on a free transfer. As a defensive midfielder, he was originally intended to be the successor to the departed Thomas Delaney, but initially alternated in this position with Philipp Bargfrede and made 23 appearances in his first season, in which he was able to both score and assist a goal. In the DFB-Pokal, Şahin was knocked out in the semi-finals with Werder to eventual winner Bayern Munich. In the first half of the 2019–20 season, Şahin appeared regularly, but lost his place in the team in February 2020 in favor of the duo Davy Klaassen and Maximilian Eggestein. After 17 games that season for Bremen, in which he assisted four goals, he suffered a hip injury in early-June which would again sideline him for a long while.

=== Antalyaspor ===
In August 2020, Şahin moved to Turkish Süper Lig club Antalyaspor, where he signed a two-year contract. He made his competitive debut for the club on 13 September, the first matchday of the season, replacing Bünyamin Balcı in the 68th minute of a 2–0 victory against Gençlerbirliği. The following week he made his first start for Antalyaspor, featuring 77 minutes in a 1–1 away draw against Beşiktaş. Şahin made 42 appearances during his first season at the club, helping the club to seventh place in the league table.

On 5 October 2021, he was appointed head coach after the club had previously dismissed former manager Ersun Yanal. He was offered the opportunity to serve as a player-manager. However, on 16 October 2021 it was announced that Şahin would exclusively take on the role of the head coach, thereby ending his playing career.

== International career ==
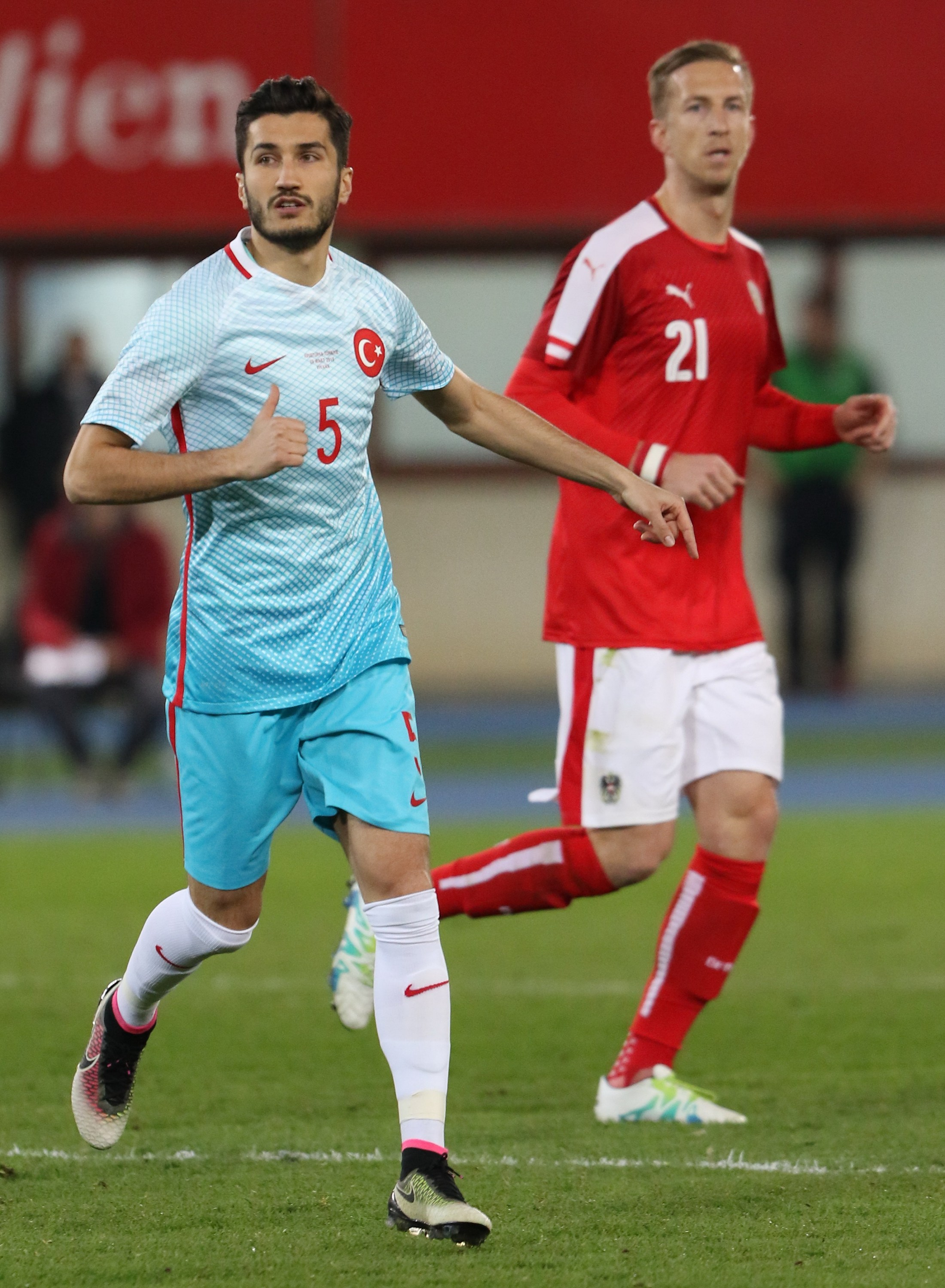
Şahin (left) and Marc Janko of Austria in March 2016, in Şahin's first international match for nearly two years.

Şahin won the bronze ball prize at the 2005 Under-17 World Cup in Peru after Turkey finished in fourth place. In August that year, he was tracked by the German Football Association but declared himself as feeling more Turkish than German.

Şahin made his senior international debut for Turkey on 8 October 2005 in a 2–1 friendly win over Germany, the country he was born in. He came on as an 85th-minute substitute for Selçuk Şahin and scored three minutes later; at 17 years, 1 month and 3 days he remains the youngest player and goalscorer for Turkey.

Şahin played no international games between June 2014 and March 2016, when he was recalled for a friendly against Austria. He was chosen for the final squad of UEFA Euro 2016 in France, his only senior tournament. He made a substitute appearance in a 3–0 loss to reigning champions Spain in a group-stage elimination, for his 50th cap.

Şahin declared his retirement from international football at age 29 in November 2017, after Turkey missed out on a place at the 2018 FIFA World Cup. He had played 52 games and scored twice for the country.

== Managerial career ==
In May 2015, Şahin became assistant coach at his childhood club RSV Meinerzhagen, with his brother Ufuk playing for the Oberliga team.

=== Antalyaspor ===
In October 2021, Şahin was appointed as the head coach of Antalyaspor, initially serving in a player-manager role following the departure of Ersun Yanal. He retired from playing later that month to focus solely on management. Under his guidance, the club enjoyed a successful unbeaten run in the 2021–22 season, finishing seventh in the Süper Lig. Şahin remained in charge until December 2023, when he left the club to accept an assistant coaching offer from Borussia Dortmund.

=== Borussia Dortmund ===
On 29 December 2023, Şahin returned to Borussia Dortmund as an assistant manager to Edin Terzić. Following Terzić's departure, Şahin was promoted to head coach on 14 June 2024, signing a contract intended to run until 2027. His tenure began with high expectations, but the team struggled with consistency throughout the first half of the 2024–25 season. By late 2024, Dortmund had dropped to mid-table in the Bundesliga, with reports citing a "falling apart" tenure marked by away defeats and squad injury issues.

In January 2025, following a string of four consecutive defeats which left the club in 10th place, Şahin was dismissed from his position. He was subsequently replaced by Niko Kovač in February 2025.

=== Başakşehir ===
On 13 September 2025, Şahin returned to the Turkish Süper Lig, being appointed as the head coach of Başakşehir. He replaced the previous management after the team went winless in their opening three matches of the season. Şahin won his first match in charge, a 2–0 away victory against Fatih Karagümrük, and was tasked with revitalizing the club's domestic campaign.

== Career statistics ==
=== Club ===
Appearances and goals by club, season and competition
Club	Season	League			National cup (Note: Includes DFB-Pokal, KNVB Cup, Copa del Rey, Turkish Cup)		League cup (Note: Includes Football League Cup)		Europe		Other		Total	
Club	Season	Division	Apps	Goals	Apps	Goals	Apps	Goals	Apps	Goals	Apps	Goals	Apps	Goals
Borussia Dortmund	2005–06	Bundesliga	23	1	0	0	—		1	0	—		24	1
Borussia Dortmund	2006–07	Bundesliga	24	0	1	0	—		—		—		25	0
Borussia Dortmund	2008–09	Bundesliga	25	2	2	0	—		1 (Note: Appearance in UEFA Cup)	0	—		28	2
Borussia Dortmund	2009–10	Bundesliga	33	4	3	2	—		—		—		36	6
Borussia Dortmund	2010–11	Bundesliga	30	6	2	0	—		8 (Note: Appearances in UEFA Europa League)	2	—		40	8
Borussia Dortmund	Total		135	13	8	2	—		10	2	—		153	17
Borussia Dortmund II	2006–07	Regionalliga Nord	4	0	—		—		—		—		4	0
Borussia Dortmund II	2008–09	Regionalliga West	1	1	—		—		—		—		1	1
Borussia Dortmund II	Total		5	1	—		—		—		—		5	1
Feyenoord (loan)	2007–08	Eredivisie	29	6	3	0	—		—		—		32	6
Real Madrid	2011–12	La Liga	4	0	2	1	—		4 (Note: Appearances in UEFA Champions League)	0	—		10	1
Liverpool (loan)	2012–13	Premier League	7	1	0	0	1	2	4	0	—		12	3
Borussia Dortmund (loan)	2012–13	Bundesliga	15	3	0	0	–		3	0	0	0	18	3
Borussia Dortmund (loan)	2013–14	Bundesliga	34	2	4	0	–		9	0	1 (Note: Appearance in DFL-Supercup)	0	48	2
Borussia Dortmund (loan)	Total		49	5	4	0	–		12	0	1	0	66	5
Borussia Dortmund	2014–15	Bundesliga	7	1	0	0	–		2	0	0	0	9	1
Borussia Dortmund	2015–16	Bundesliga	9	0	0	0	–		3	0	0	0	12	0
Borussia Dortmund	2016–17	Bundesliga	5	0	1	0	–		3	1	0	0	9	1
Borussia Dortmund	2017–18	Bundesliga	18	2	2	0	–		4 (Note: Three appearances in UEFA Champions League, one appearance in UEFA Europa League)	0	1	0	25	2
Borussia Dortmund	Total		39	3	3	0	–		12	1	1	0	55	4
Werder Bremen	2018–19	Bundesliga	20	1	3	0	–		–		–		23	1
Werder Bremen	2019–20	Bundesliga	16	0	1	0	–		–		0	0	17	0
Werder Bremen	Total		36	1	4	0	–		–		0	0	40	1
Antalyaspor	2020–21	Süper Lig	36	0	6	0	–		–		–		42	0
Career total			340	30	30	3	1	2	42	2	2	0	416	37

=== International ===
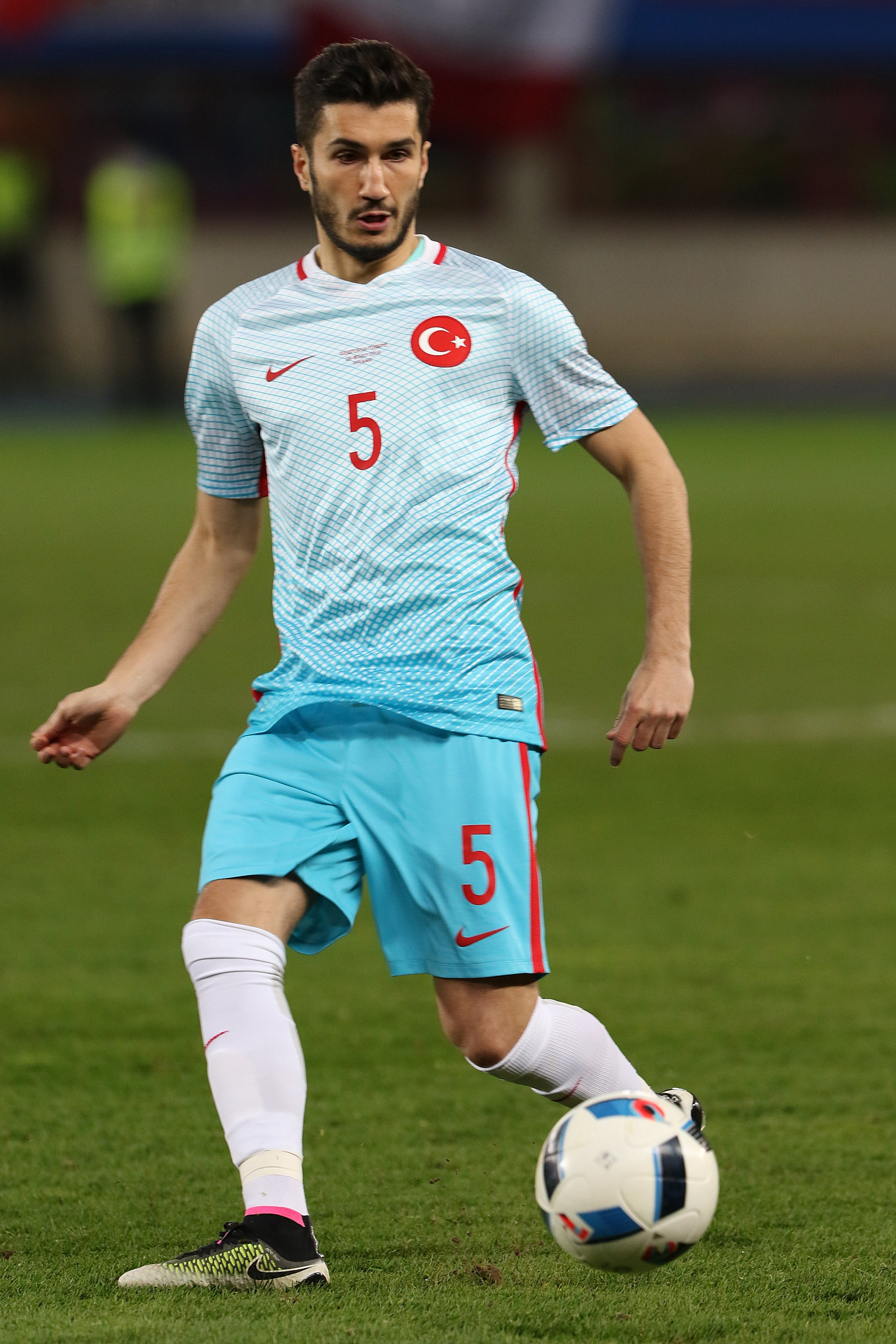
Şahin playing a pass for Turkey in a friendly game against Austria in 2016.

Appearances and goals by national team and year
National team	Year	Apps	Goals
Turkey	2005	1	1
Turkey	2006	9	0
Turkey	2007	1	0
Turkey	2008	4	0
Turkey	2009	5	0
Turkey	2010	5	0
Turkey	2011	1	0
Turkey	2012	11	1
Turkey	2013	6	0
Turkey	2014	3	0
Turkey	2015	0	0
Turkey	2016	4	0
Turkey	2017	2	0
Total		52	2

Scores and results list Turkey's goal tally first, score column indicates score after each Şahin goal.

List of international goals scored by Nuri Şahin
No.	Date	Venue	Opponent	Score	Result	Competition
1	8 October 2005	Atatürk Olympic Stadium, Istanbul, Turkey	Germany	2–0	2–1	Friendly
2	24 May 2012	Red Bull Arena, Salzburg, Austria	Georgia	2–0	3–1	Friendly

== Managerial statistics ==
As of match played 7 November 2026

Managerial record by team and tenure
Team	From	To	Record					Ref.
Team	From	To	P	W	D	L	Win %	Ref.
Antalyaspor	5 October 2021	31 December 2023	94	39	24	31	41.49	
Borussia Dortmund	14 June 2024	21 January 2025	27	12	4	11	44.44	
Başakşehir	13 September 2025	present	48	23	10	15	47.92	
Total			169	74	38	57	43.79	

== Honours ==
Feyenoord

- KNVB Cup: 2007–08

Borussia Dortmund

- Bundesliga: 2010–11
- DFB-Pokal: 2016–17
- DFL-Supercup: 2013
- UEFA Champions League runner-up: 2012–13

Real Madrid

- La Liga: 2011–12

Turkey U17

- UEFA European Under-17 Championship: 2005

Individual

- UEFA European Under-17 Championship Golden Player: 2005
- FIFA U-17 World Cup Bronze Ball: 2005
- FIFA U-17 World Cup Silver Shoe: 2005
- VDV Player of the Season (Silver Boot): 2010–11
- kicker Bundesliga Player of the Season: 2010–11
- kicker Bundesliga Team of the Season: 2010–11
- ESM Team of the Year: 2010–11
