= 2005 UEFA European Under-17 Championship =

2005 UEFA Under-17 Championship
Campionato europeo di calcio Under-17 2005

Tournament details
- Host country: Italy
- Dates: 3–14 May
- Teams: 8

Final positions
- Champions: Turkey (2nd title)
- Runners-up: Netherlands
- Third place: Italy
- Fourth place: Croatia

Tournament statistics
- Matches played: 16
- Goals scored: 51 (3.19 per match)
- Attendance: 13,155 (822 per match)
- Top scorer: (Turkey) Tevfik Köse (6 goals)
- Best player: (Turkey) Nuri Şahin

The 2005 UEFA European Under-17 Championship was the fourth edition of UEFA's European Under-17 Football Championship. Italy hosted the championship, during 3–14 May. Turkey defeated Netherlands in the final to win the competition for the second time.

== Qualifying ==
2005 UEFA European Under-17 Championship qualifying round

== Match officials ==
A total of 6 referees, 8 assistant referees and 2 fourth officials were appointed for the final tournament.

Referees

- (Czech Republic) Pavel Kralovec
- (Finland) Jöuni Hietala
- (Norway) Svein Oddvar Moen
- (Romania) Pavel Cristian Balaj
- (Slovakia) Pavel Olsiak
- (Spain) Bernardino Gonzalez Vazquez

Assistant referees

- (Belgium) Vincent De Spiegeleer
- (Denmark) Henrik Sonderby
- (Estonia) Hannes Reinvald
- (Kazakhstan) Ruslan Duzmambetov
- (Malta) Konrad G. Borg
- (Moldova) Veaselav Berco
- (Poland) Rafal Rostkowski
- (Ukraine) Andriy Pryimak

Fourth officials

- (Italy) Luca Banti
- (Italy) Nicola Stefanini

== Cities & Stadiums ==
| Città | Stadio |
|---|---|
| Santa Croce sull'Arno | Stadio Libero Masini |
| Pontedera | Stadio Ettore Mannucci |
| Castelfranco di Sotto | Stadio Osvaldo Martini |
| Cascina | Stadio Simone Redini |
| San Giuliano Terme | Stadio Giovanni Bui |
| Santa Maria a Monte | Stadio Gabriele Di Lupo |

== Group stage ==
=== Group A ===
| Teams | GP | W | D | L | GF | GA | GD | Pts | Status |
|---|---|---|---|---|---|---|---|---|---|
| Italy | 3 | 2 | 0 | 1 | 2 | 1 | +1 | 6 | Advanced to the semi-finals |
| Turkey | 3 | 2 | 0 | 1 | 8 | 4 | +4 | 6 | Advanced to the semi-finals |
| England | 3 | 1 | 0 | 2 | 6 | 4 | +2 | 3 | |
| Belarus | 3 | 1 | 0 | 2 | 2 | 9 | −7 | 3 | |

3 May 2005
16:00 CET

| Belarus | 0–4 | England |
|---|---|---|
| | Report | Weston 19'; Ephraim 44', 55'; Garner 69' (pen.) |

Stadio Libero Masini, Santa Croce sull'Arno
Attendance: 300
Referee: Jouni Hietala (Finland)
3 May 2005
19:00 CET

| Italy | 1–0 | Turkey |
|---|---|---|
| Russotto 50' | Report |

Stadio Ettore Mannucci, Pontedera
Attendance: 1,700
Referee: Cristian Balaj (Romania)

5 May 2005
16:00 CET

| Italy | 0–1 | Belarus |
|---|---|---|
| | Report | Kisly 57' |

Stadio Osvaldo Martini, Castelfranco di Sotto
Attendance: 400
Referee: Pavel Olsiak (Slovakia)
5 May 2005
16:00 CET

| Turkey | 3–2 | England |
|---|---|---|
| Köse 21', 32'; Şahin 71' | Report | Garner 41', 60' |

Stadio Ettore Mannucci, Pontedera
Attendance: 400
Referee: Pavel Kralovec (Czech Republic)

8 May 2005
17:15 CET

| England | 0–1 | Italy |
|---|---|---|
| | Report | Russotto 35' (pen.) |

Stadio Simone Redini, Cascina
Attendance: 1,700
Referee: Bernardino González Vázquez (Spain)
8 May 2005
17:15 CET

| Turkey | 5–1 | Belarus |
|---|---|---|
| Köse 38' (pen.), 44', 66'; D. Yılmaz 67', 69' | Report | Sivakov 50' |

Stadio Osvaldo Martini, Castelfranco di Sotto
Attendance: 300
Referee: Svein Oddvar Moen (Norway)

=== Group B ===
| Teams | GP | W | D | L | GF | GA | GD | Pts | Status |
|---|---|---|---|---|---|---|---|---|---|
| Croatia | 3 | 2 | 1 | 0 | 11 | 6 | +5 | 7 | Advanced to the semi-finals |
| Netherlands | 3 | 1 | 2 | 0 | 4 | 3 | +1 | 5 | Advanced to the semi-finals |
| Switzerland | 3 | 1 | 1 | 1 | 5 | 5 | 0 | 4 | |
| Israel | 3 | 0 | 0 | 3 | 3 | 9 | −6 | 0 | |

3 May 2005
16:00 CET

| Israel | 0–3 | Switzerland |
|---|---|---|
| | Report | Halimi 13'; Gashi 42'; Rakitić 48' |

Stadio Simone Redini, Cascina
Attendance: 350
Referee: Pavel Kralovec (Czech Republic)
3 May 2005
17:00 CET

| Croatia | 2–2 | Netherlands |
|---|---|---|
| Kalinić 29'; Bačelić-Grgić 67' | Report | Vorthoren 81'; Van der Laan 84' |

Stadio Giovanni Bui, San Giuliano Terme
Attendance: 700
Referee: Bernardino González Vázquez (Spain)

5 May 2005
16:00 CET

| Switzerland | 0–0 | Netherlands |
|---|---|---|
| | Report |

Stadio Giovanni Bui, San Giuliano Terme
Attendance: 750
Referee: Svein Oddvar Moen (Norway)
5 May 2005
18:30 CET

| Israel | 2–4 | Croatia |
|---|---|---|
| Kayal 40'; Bar Buzaglo 47' | Report | Vidović 42', 69'; Tobi 67' (o.g.); G. Radoš 79' |

Stadio Santa Maria a Monte, Santa Maria a Monte
Attendance: 550
Referee: Jouni Hietala (Finland)

8 May 2005
15 CET

| Netherlands | 2–1 | Israel |
|---|---|---|
| Sarpong 37'; Biseswar 65' | Report | Snappir 7' |

Stadio Santa Maria a Monte, Santa Maria a Monte
Attendance: 600
Referee: Pavel Olsiak (Slovakia)
8 May 2005
15:00 CET

| Switzerland | 2–5 | Croatia |
|---|---|---|
| Halimi 28'; Lovren 60' (o.g.) | Report | Kalinić 50', 77' (pen.); Mehmedagić 53'; Vidović 68'; Staubli 79' (o.g.) |

Stadio Libero Masini, Santa Croce sull'Arno
Attendance: 400
Referee: Cristian Balaj (Romania)

== Knockout stage ==
=== Semi-finals ===
11 May 2005
20:00 CET

| Italy | 0–1 | Netherlands |
|---|---|---|
| | Report | Zaalman 89' |

Stadio Ettore Mannucci, Pontedera
Attendance: 1,700
Referee: Cristian Balaj (Romania)

11 May 2005
16:30 CET

| Croatia | 1–3 | Turkey |
|---|---|---|
| G. Radoš 69' | Report | Özcan 26', 61'; Duruer 73' |

Stadio Simone Redini, Cascina
Attendance: 1,005
Referee: Pavel Olsiak (Slovakia)

For winning their semi-finals, Netherlands and Turkey qualified for the 2005 FIFA U-17 World Championship with Italy and Croatia meeting in the third place playoff for the third and final place in the 2005 FIFA U-17 World Championship.

=== Third place play-off ===
14 May 2005
15:00 CET

| Italy | 2–1 (a.e.t.) | Croatia |
|---|---|---|
| De Silvestri 59'; Di Gennaro 102' | Report | Kalinić 60' |

Stadio Libero Masini, Santa Croce sull'Arno
Attendance: 800
Referee: Pavel Kralovec (Czech Republic)

For winning the third place play-off, Italy qualified for the 2005 FIFA U-17 World Championship with Croatia missing out.

=== Final ===
14 May 2005
19:00 CET

| Netherlands | 0–2 | Turkey |
|---|---|---|
| | Report | D. Yılmaz 46'; Köse 51' |

Stadio Ettore Mannucci, Pontedera
Attendance: 1,500
Referee: Bernardino González Vázquez (Spain)
