= Ihar Lisitsa =

Belarusian footballer

Personal information
- Date of birth: 10 April 1988 (age 38)
- Place of birth: Lida, Belarusian SSR
- Height: 1.80 m (5 ft 11 in)
- Position: Midfielder

Youth career
- –2005: Lida

Senior career*
Years	Team	Apps	(Gls)
2006–2008	Neman Grodno	11	(0)
2009–2014	Belshina Bobruisk	141	(14)
2014–2015	Neman Grodno	33	(1)
2016	Granit Mikashevichi	12	(0)
2016	Vitebsk	15	(0)
2017	Naftan Novopolotsk	28	(0)
2018–2019	Lida	50	(7)
- * Club domestic league appearances and goals as of 31 December 2019

Ihar Anatolevich Lisitsa (Belarusian: Ігар Анатолевіч Лісіца; Russian: Игорь Лисица (Igor Lisitsa); born 10 April 1988) is a Belarusian former professional football player.

In July 2020 Lisitsa was found guilty of being involved in a match-fixing schema in Belarusian football. He was sentenced to 1 year of house arrest and banned from Belarusian football for three years.
