= Josip Solić =

Croatian footballer

Josip Šolić
Personal information
- Date of birth: 24 February 1988 (age 38)
- Place of birth: Solin, SFR Yugoslavia
- Height: 1.84 m (6 ft 0 in)
- Position: Goalkeeper

Team information
- Current team: NK Uskok

Youth career
- –2005: Hajduk Split
- 2005–2006: SC Freiburg

Senior career*
Years	Team	Apps	(Gls)
2005–2008	SC Freiburg	0	(0)
2005–2007	→ SC Freiburg II	31	(0)
2008–2009	Solin	1	(0)
2009–2010	Zmaj Makarska	23	(0)
2010–2011	Mosor	24	(0)
2011–2013	Silkeborg	0	(0)
2014–2015	Dugopolje	11	(0)
2016–2019	Primorac Stobreč	46	(0)
2019–2021	Sloga Mravince	36	(0)
2021	Zagora Unešić	14	(0)
2022–	Uskok	30	(0)
Total		216	(0)
- * Club domestic league appearances and goals

Josip Šolić (born 24 February 1988) is a Croatian former professional footballer who is currently playing as a goalkeeper for NK Uskok.
