= Remo Staubli =

American-born Swiss footballer (born 1988)

Personal information
- Full name: Remo Staubli
- Date of birth: October 7, 1988 (age 38)
- Place of birth: New York, New York, United States
- Height: 1.87 m (6 ft 2 in)
- Position: Striker

Youth career
- FC Meilen
- FC Zürich

Senior career*
Years	Team	Apps	(Gls)
2006–2012	FC Zürich	14	(2)
2009–2010	→ FC Schaffhausen (loan)	19	(7)
2010–2011	→ FC Lugano (loan)	7	(0)
2011–2012	→ FC Aarau (loan)	29	(11)
2012–2014	FC Aarau	54	(17)
2014–2016	FC Meilen		
2016–2018	Rapperswil-Jona	0	(0)
- * Club domestic league appearances and goals

Remo Staubli (born October 7, 1988) is an American-born Swiss retired footballer who played as a forward. He was part of FC Zürich's 2006–07 Swiss Championship-winning team. He had a trial with Manchester United in July 2005.
