= Grgur Radoš =

Croatian footballer

Personal information
- Full name: Grgur Radoš
- Date of birth: 31 January 1988 (age 38)
- Place of birth: Munich, West Germany
- Height: 1.76 m (5 ft 9 in)
- Position: Striker

Youth career
- Post-SV München
- Bayern Munich
- TSV Milbertshofen
- until 2006: Unterhaching

Senior career*
Years	Team	Apps	(Gls)
2006	Triestina	0	(0)
2006–2007	Varteks	3	(0)
2008	FSV Oggersheim	8	(0)
2008–2010	Hamburger SV II	20	(1)
2010–2011	Jettingen	4	(7)
2011–2014	VfB Friedrichshafen	24	(15)
2014–2015	FC Erding	23	(3)
2016	SV Pullach	4	(0)
2016–2017	1906 Haidhausen	20	(17)
2017–2021	Spvgg Feldmoching	29	(8)
2021-	SV Laim	13	(5)
- * Club domestic league appearances and goals as of 2 December 2022

Grgur Radoš (born 31 January 1988 in Munich) is a Croatian football player who plays for German amateur side SV Laim.

== Personal life ==
His twin brother Mislav Radoš is a professional footballer as well and holds German citizenship and is a cousin of Danijel Pranjic.
