= Bünyamin Balcı =

Turkish footballer (born 2000)

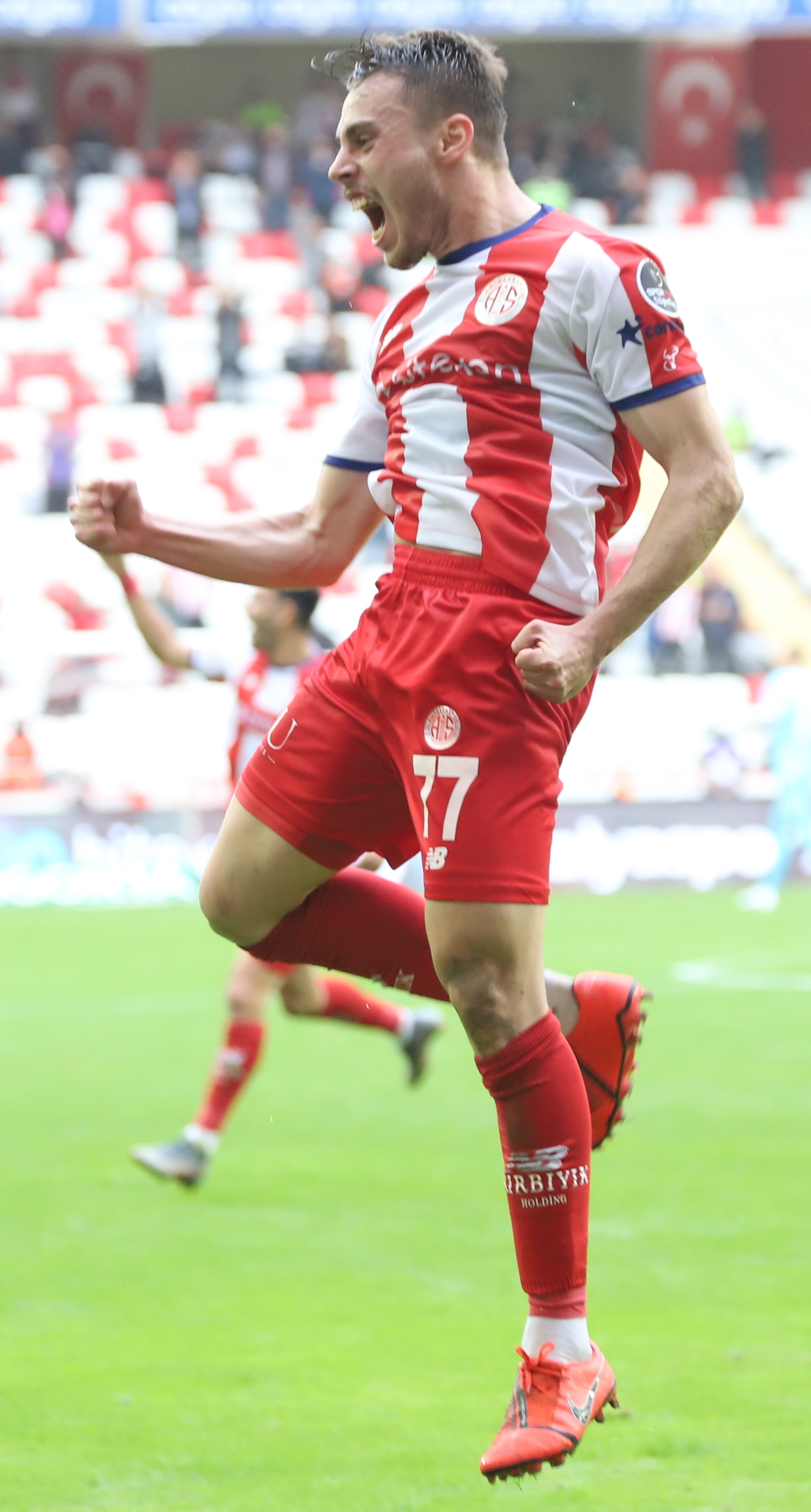
- Balcı playing for Antalyaspor in 2021

Personal information
- Full name: Bünyamin Balcı
- Date of birth: 31 May 2000 (age 26)
- Place of birth: Samsun, Turkey
- Height: 1.80 m (5 ft 11 in)
- Position: Right-back

Team information
- Current team: Antalyaspor
- Number: 7

Youth career
- 2011: Antalyagücü
- 2011–2012: Meydan Gençlikspor
- 2012–2020: Antalyaspor

Senior career*
Years	Team	Apps	(Gls)
2020–	Antalyaspor	195	(5)

International career^{‡}
2017–	Turkey Futsal	10	(5)
2018–2019	Turkey Futsal U19	13	(14)
2020–2022	Turkey U21	12	(0)
- * Club domestic league appearances and goals as of 1 June 2026 ‡ National team caps and goals as of 15 June 2022

Bünyamin Balcı (born 31 May 2000) is a Turkish football player who plays as a right-back for Süper Lig club Antalyaspor. Balcı also represents the Turkey national futsal team.

== Career ==
Balcı signed his first professional contract with Antalyaspor on 26 November 2018. He made his professional debut with Antalyaspor in a 4-3 Turkish Cup win over Göztepe S.K. on 16 January 2020.
