= 2020–21 Fenerbahçe S.K. season =

Fenerbahçe
2020–21 season
- President: Ali Koç
- Head coach: Erol Bulut (until 25 March 2021); Emre Belözoğlu (caretaker, from 25 March 2021)
- Stadium: Şükrü Saracoğlu Stadium
- Süper Lig: 3rd
- Turkish Cup: Quarter-finals
- Top goalscorer: League: Enner Valencia (12); All: Enner Valencia (13)
- Biggest win: 5–1 vs Gençlerbirliği; 4–0 vs Sivas Belediyespor
- Biggest defeat: 0–3 vs Yeni Malatyaspor
Home colours	Away colours	Third colours

The 2020–21 season was the 114th season in the existence of Fenerbahçe S.K. and the club's 63rd consecutive season in the top flight of Turkish football. In addition to the domestic league, Fenerbahçe participated in this season's editions of the Turkish Cup.

== Club ==
=== Board of directors ===
You can see the fields of the board members by moving the pointer to the dotted field.

Position	Staff
Chairman	(Turkey) Ali Koç
Deputy Chairman	(Turkey) Erol Bilecik
Vice-Chairman	(Turkey) Mehmet Burhan Karaçam
Secretary General	(Turkey) Burak Çağlan Kızılhan
Board Member	(Turkey) Sevil Zeynep Becan
Board Member	(Turkey) Şaban Erdikler
Board Member	(Turkey) Mustafa Tankut Turnaoğlu
Board Member	(Turkey) Fethi Pekin
Board Member	(Turkey) Turhan Şahin
Board Member	(Turkey) Mustafa Kemal Danabaş
Board Member	(Turkey) Acar Sertaç Komsuoğlu
Board Member	(Turkey) Simla Türker Bayazıt
Board Member	(Turkey) Ömer Okan
Board Member	(Turkey) Alper Pirşen
Associate Member	(Turkey) Ozan Korman Tarman
Associate Member	(Turkey) Metin Sipahioğlu
Associate Member	(Turkey) Selahattin Baki
Associate Member	(Turkey) Muhittin İlker Dinçay
Associate Member	(Turkey) Esra Nazlı Ercan

Last updated: 4 September 2020
Source: Fenerbahce.org

=== Staff ===
The list of the staff is below.

Field	Name
Director of football	(Turkey) Emre Belözoğlu
Administrative manager	(Turkey) Volkan Ballı
Administrative coordinator	(Turkey) Selçuk Şahin
Manager	(Turkey) Emre Belözoğlu
Assistant manager	(Turkey) Erdinç Sözer
Assistant manager	(Turkey) Volkan Demirel
Assistant manager	(Turkey) Mehmet Aurélio
Assistant manager	(Turkey) Zeki Murat Göle
Goalkeeper coach	(Germany) Michael Kraft
Goalkeeper coach	(Germany) Marco Knoop
Performance trainer	(Turkey) Murat Bel
Individual Performance Specialist	(Turkey) Fatih Yıldız
Individual Performance Specialist	(Turkey) Halil Filik
Analyst	(Turkey) Beri Pardo
Analyst	(Turkey) Melikşah Zengin
Scouting Staff Leader	(Turkey) Serhat Pekmezci
Media Specialist	(Turkey) Alper Yemeniciler
Doctor	(Turkey) Prof. Dr. Burak Kunduracıoğlu
Physiotherapist	(Turkey) Umut Şahin
Physiotherapist	(Turkey) Ata Özgür Ercan
Physiotherapist	(Turkey) Bülent Uyar
Masseur	(Turkey) Fuat Öz
Masseur	(Turkey) Murat Çalışkan
Masseur	(Turkey) Özkan Alaca
Media Specialist	(Turkey) Çağrı Çobanoğlu
Translator	(Turkey) Görkem Ekal
Translator	(Turkey) Sinan Levi
Translator	(Turkey) Saruhan Karaman
Dietitian	(Turkey) Şengül Sangu Talak

=== Facilities ===
Position	Staff
Stadium	(Turkey) Şükrü Saracoğlu Stadium
Training facility	(Turkey) Lefter Küçükandonyadis Tesisleri
Training facility	(Turkey) Faruk Ilgaz Tesisleri
Training facility	(Turkey) Düzce Topuk Yaylası Tesisleri
Training facility	(Turkey) Can Bartu Tesisleri
Training facility	(Turkey) Fikirtepe Tesisleri

== Kits ==
Fenerbahçe's 2020–21 kits, manufactured by Adidas, appeared on 6 August 2020 for the first time on new transferred footballers and were up for sale on 12 August 2020.

- Supplier: Adidas
- Main sponsor: Avis
- Back sponsor: Halley
- Sleeve sponsor: HeForShe, Tüpraş
- Short sponsor: Aygaz
- Socks sponsor: Nesine.com

Home
Home alt.
Away
Away alt.
Third
Goalkeeper 1
Goalkeeper 2
Goalkeeper 3

=== Training ===
Players	Staff

== Players ==
=== First-team squad ===
N	Pos.	Nat.	Name	Age	EU	Since	App	Goals	Ends	Transfer fee	Notes
1	GK	(Turkey)	Altay Bayındır	23	Non-EU	2019	70	0	2023	€1.50M	
3	DF	(Uruguay)	Mauricio Lemos	25	Non-EU	2020	10	0	2023	€1.50M	
4	DF	(Turkey)	Serdar Aziz	30	Non-EU	2019 (Winter)	64	8	2022	Free	
5	MF	(Argentina)	José Sosa	35	Non-EU	2020	36	4	2022	Free	
7	MF	(Turkey)	Ozan Tufan	25	Non-EU	2015	173	21	2023	€7.00M	
8	MF	(Turkey)	Mert Hakan Yandaş	26	Non-EU	2020	38	4	2024	Free	
9	FW	(Senegal)	Papiss Cissé	35	EU	2020	28	5	2021	Free	Second nationality: French
10	FW	(Tanzania)	Mbwana Samatta	28	Non-EU	2020	30	6	2024	€6.00M	
11	MF	(Argentina)	Diego Perotti	32	EU	2020	4	3	2022	Free	Second nationality: Spanish
13	FW	(Ecuador)	Enner Valencia	31	Non-EU	2020	35	13	2023	Free	
14	MF	(Greece)	Dimitrios Pelkas	27	EU	2020	34	8	2023	€1.60M	
15	GK	(Turkey)	Harun Tekin	31	Non-EU	2018	47	0	2021	€2.50M	
16	MF	(Netherlands)	Ferdi Kadıoğlu	21	EU	2018	62	7	2022	€1.40M	Other nationalities: Turkish, Canadian
17	MF	(Turkey)	İrfan Kahveci	25	Non-EU	2021 (Winter)	12	0	2025	€7.00M	
18	DF	(Turkey)	Sadık Çiftpınar	28	Non-EU	2019 (Winter)	27	2	2022	Free	
20	MF	(Brazil)	Luiz Gustavo (Vice-Captain)	33	Non-EU	2019	69	4	2023	€6.00M	
21	MF	(Nigeria)	Bright Osayi-Samuel	23	Non-EU	2021 (Winter)	19	1	2025	Undisclosed	Second nationality: English
26	DF	(Democratic Republic of the Congo)	Marcel Tisserand	28	EU	2020	25	1	2023	€4.00M	Second nationality: French
27	FW	(Senegal)	Mame Thiam	28	Non-EU	2020	34	8	2023	Free	
29	MF	(Germany)	Sinan Gümüş	27	EU	2020	20	3	2023	Free	Second nationality: Turkish
30	MF	(Turkey)	Ömer Faruk Beyaz	17	Non-EU	2020	8	0	2021	Youth system	
35	DF	(Turkey)	Nazım Sangaré	26	EU	2020	21	1	2024	€1.75M	Other nationalities: German, Guinean
37	DF	(Czech Republic)	Filip Novák	30	EU	2020	20	1	2023	Free	
41	DF	(Hungary)	Attila Szalai	23	EU	2021 (Winter)	22	3	2025	€2.00M	
48	GK	(Turkey)	Oytun Özdoğan	22	Non-EU	2019	2	0	2021	Youth system	
67	MF	(Germany)	Mesut Özil	32	EU	2021 (Winter)	11	0	2024	Free	Second nationality: Turkish
77	DF	(Turkey)	Gökhan Gönül (Captain)	36	Non-EU	2020	361	14	2021	Free	
88	DF	(Turkey)	Caner Erkin	32	Non-EU	2020	250	16	2022	Free	
Players sold or loaned out after the start of the season
6	MF	(Turkey)	Tolga Ciğerci	27	EU	2018	37	2	2021	Free	Second nationality: German
11	MF	(Cape Verde)	Garry Rodrigues	29	EU	2019	29	4	2021	Free	Second nationality: Dutch
17	MF	(Morocco)	Nabil Dirar	34	EU	2017	89	8	2022	€2.00M	Second nationality: Belgian
19	FW	(Iran)	Allahyar Sayyadmanesh	19	Non-EU	2019	3	0	2024	Free	
22	FW	(Switzerland)	Michael Frey	26	Non-EU	2018	23	5	2022	€2.64M	
23	MF	(Turkey)	Deniz Türüç	27	EU	2019	38	6	2022	€2.00M	Second nationality: Dutch
28	DF	(Turkey)	Murat Sağlam	22	EU	2019	5	0	2022	Free	Second nationality: German
32	DF	(Denmark)	Zanka	30	EU	2019	21	3	2022	€2.00M	Second nationality: Gambian
99	FW	(Switzerland)	Kemal Ademi	24	EU	2020	8	1	2023	Undisclosed	Second nationality: German

- Last updated: 15 May 2021
- Source: Fenerbahce.org
- Ordered by squad number.

== Transfers ==
=== In ===
No.	Pos.	Nat.	Name	Age	Moving from	Type	Transfer window	Ends	Transfer fee	Source
32	DF	(Denmark)	Zanka	30	(Germany) Fortuna Düsseldorf	End of loan	Summer	2022	Free	
66	MF	(Turkey)	Oğuz Kağan Güçtekin	21	Çaykur Rizespor	End of loan	Summer	2022	Free	
22	FW	(Switzerland)	Michael Frey	26	(Germany) 1. FC Nürnberg	End of loan	Summer	2022	Free	
99	MF	(Turkey)	İsmail Yüksek	21	Gölcükspor	Transfer	Summer	2025	₺500K	Fenerbahce.org
8	MF	(Turkey)	Mert Hakan Yandaş	25	Sivasspor	End of contract	Summer	2024	Free	Fenerbahce.org
77	DF	(Turkey)	Gökhan Gönül	35	Beşiktaş	End of contract	Summer	2021	Free	Fenerbahce.org
88	DF	(Turkey)	Caner Erkin	31	Beşiktaş	End of contract	Summer	2022	Free	Fenerbahce.org
37	DF	(Czech Republic)	Filip Novák	30	Trabzonspor	End of contract	Summer	2023	Free	Fenerbahce.org
	FW	(Turkey)	Barış Sungur	18	1928 Bucaspor	Transfer	Summer	2025	Free	Fenerbahce.org
27	FW	(Senegal)	Mame Thiam	27	Kasımpaşa	Transfer	Summer	2023	Free	Fenerbahce.org
29	MF	(Germany)	Sinan Gümüş	26	(Italy) Genoa	Transfer	Summer	2023	Free	Fenerbahce.org
5	MF	(Argentina)	José Sosa	35	Trabzonspor	End of contract	Summer	2022	Free	Fenerbahce.org
3	DF	(Uruguay)	Mauricio Lemos	24	(Spain) Las Palmas	Transfer	Summer	2023	€1.50M	Fenerbahce.org
13	FW	(Ecuador)	Enner Valencia	30	(Mexico) Tigres UANL	End of contract	Summer	2023	Free	Fenerbahce.org
26	DF	(Democratic Republic of the Congo)	Marcel Tisserand	27	(Germany) Wolfsburg	Transfer	Summer	2023	€4.00M	Fenerbahce.org
35	DF	(Turkey)	Nazım Sangaré	26	Antalyaspor	Transfer	Summer	2024	€1.75M	Fenerbahce.org
10	FW	(Tanzania)	Mbwana Samatta	27	(England) Aston Villa	Loan	Summer	2024	€6.00M	Fenerbahce.org
9	FW	(Senegal)	Papiss Cissé	34	Alanyaspor	End of contract	Summer	2021	Free	Fenerbahce.org
99	FW	(Switzerland)	Kemal Ademi	24	(Switzerland) Basel	Transfer	Summer	2023	Undisclosed	Fenerbahce.org
14	MF	(Greece)	Dimitrios Pelkas	26	(Greece) PAOK	Transfer	Summer	2023	€1.60M	Fenerbahce.org
11	MF	(Argentina)	Diego Perotti	32	(Italy) Roma	End of contract	Summer	2022	Free	Fenerbahce.org
71	MF	(Turkey)	İsmail Yüksek	21	Balıkesirspor	End of loan	Winter	2025	Free	
41	DF	(Hungary)	Attila Szalai	22	(Cyprus) Apollon Limassol	Transfer	Winter	2025	€2.00M	Fenerbahce.org
67	MF	(Germany)	Mesut Özil	32	(England) Arsenal	Transfer	Winter	2024	Free	Fenerbahce.org
21	MF	(England)	Bright Osayi-Samuel	23	(England) Queens Park Rangers	Transfer	Winter	2025	Undisclosed	Fenerbahce.org
17	MF	(Turkey)	İrfan Kahveci	25	İstanbul Başakşehir	Transfer	Winter	2025	€7.00M	Fenerbahce.org

=== Out ===
No.	Pos.	Nat.	Name	Age	Moving to	Type	Transfer window	Transfer fee	Source
5	MF	(Turkey)	Emre Belözoğlu	39	Retired	Retirement	Summer	Free	Fenerbahce.org
2	DF	(Guinea)	Simon Falette	28	(Germany) Eintracht Frankfurt	End of loan	Summer	Free	
8	MF	(Turkey)	Mehmet Ekici	30		End of contract	Summer	Free	
54	GK	(Turkey)	Erten Ersu	26	Konyaspor	End of contract	Summer	Free	Konyaspor.org.tr
3	DF	(Turkey)	Hasan Ali Kaldırım	30	İstanbul Başakşehir	End of contract	Summer	Free	Ibfk.com.tr
26	MF	(Turkey)	Alper Potuk	29	Ankaragücü	Mutual agreement	Summer	Free	Fenerbahce.org
9	FW	(Turkey)	Mevlüt Erdinç	33	Fatih Karagümrük	Mutual agreement	Summer	Free	Fenerbahce.org
6	MF	(Germany)	Tolgay Arslan	30	(Italy) Udinese	Mutual agreement	Summer	Free	Fenerbahce.org
94	FW	(Kosovo)	Vedat Muriqi	26	(Italy) Lazio	Transfer	Summer	€17.50M	Sslazio.it
21	MF	(Slovenia)	Miha Zajc	26	(Italy) Genoa	Loan	Summer	Free	Fenerbahce.org
25	MF	(Brazil)	Jailson	25	(China) Dalian Pro	Transfer	Summer	€4.50M	Fenerbahce.org
66	MF	(Turkey)	Oğuz Kağan Güçtekin	21	Konyaspor	Loan	Summer	Free	Fenerbahce.org
22	FW	(Switzerland)	Michael Frey	26	(Belgium) Waasland-Beveren	Loan	Summer	Free	Fenerbahce.org
19	FW	(Iran)	Allahyar Sayyadmanesh	19	(Ukraine) Zorya Luhansk	Loan	Summer	Free	Fenerbahce.org
28	DF	(Turkey)	Murat Sağlam	22	Çaykur Rizespor	Loan	Summer	Free	Fenerbahce.org
99	MF	(Turkey)	İsmail Yüksek	21	Balıkesirspor	Loan	Summer	Free	
23	MF	(Turkey)	Deniz Türüç	27	İstanbul Başakşehir	Loan	Summer	Free	Ibfk.com.tr
32	DF	(Denmark)	Zanka	30	(Denmark) Copenhagen	Loan	Summer	Free	Fck.dk
11	MF	(Cape Verde)	Garry Rodrigues	29	(Saudi Arabia) Al-Ittihad	Mutual agreement	Mid-season	Free	Fenerbahce.org
70	MF	(Turkey)	Serhat Ahmetoğlu	18	Fatih Karagümrük	Loan	Winter	Free	Fenerbahce.org
17	MF	(Morocco)	Nabil Dirar	34	(Belgium) Club Brugge	Loan	Winter	€700K	Clubbrugge.be
99	FW	(Switzerland)	Kemal Ademi	25	Fatih Karagümrük	Loan	Winter	Free	Fenerbahce.org
6	MF	(Turkey)	Tolga Ciğerci	28	İstanbul Başakşehir	Mutual agreement	Winter	Free	Fenerbahce.org
71	MF	(Turkey)	İsmail Yüksek	22	Adana Demirspor	Loan	Winter	Free	Fenerbahce.org

Total spending: ▼€14.60M
Total income: ▲€23.10M
Expenditure: ▲€8.50M

== Pre-season and friendlies ==
Win Draw Loss

=== Pre-season ===
15 August 2020 Friendly	Fenerbahçe (Turkey)	4–0	(Turkey) İstanbulspor	Istanbul, Turkey
17:00 TRT (UTC+3)	Aziz 22'; Muriqi 37'; Potuk 53' (pen.); Erdinç 73'	Report		Stadium: Fenerbahçe Can Bartu Facilities

22 August 2020 Friendly	Fenerbahçe (Turkey)	2–2	(Turkey) Fatih Karagümrük	Düzce, Turkey
17:00 TRT (UTC+3)	Tufan 7' (pen.); Yandaş 47'	Report	Ndao 5', 77'	Stadium: Fenerbahçe Serkan Acar Resort & Sports Topuk Yaylası Facilities

28 August 2020 Friendly	Fenerbahçe (Turkey)	1–1	(Turkey) Alanyaspor	Düzce, Turkey
17:00 TRT (UTC+3)	Kadıoğlu 38'	Report	Uçan 5'	Stadium: Fenerbahçe Serkan Acar Resort & Sports Topuk Yaylası Facilities

31 August 2020 LOL Cup SF	Fenerbahçe (Turkey)	4–0	(Turkey) Antalyaspor	Istanbul, Turkey
21:00 TRT (UTC+3)	Thiam 29', 40', 82'; Erkin 64' (pen.)	Report		Stadium: Şükrü Saracoğlu Stadium; Referee: Onur Özütoprak

5 September 2020 LOL Cup Final	Fenerbahçe (Turkey)	1–0	(Turkey) Sivasspor	Istanbul, Turkey
21:00 TRT (UTC+3)	Erkin 67'	Report		Stadium: Şükrü Saracoğlu Stadium; Referee: Volkan Bayarslan

=== Mid-season ===
10 October 2020 Friendly	Fenerbahçe (Turkey)	3–2	(Turkey) İstanbulspor	Istanbul, Turkey
17:00 TRT (UTC+3)	Gümüş 8'; Yandaş 67'; Cissé 77'	Report	Rroca 40'; Lemos 42' (o.g.)	Stadium: Fenerbahçe Can Bartu Facilities

15 November 2020 Friendly	Fenerbahçe (Turkey)	3–3	(Turkey) Fatih Karagümrük	Istanbul, Turkey
16:00 TRT (UTC+3)	Cissé 24'; Ahmetoğlu 41'; Ademi 45'	Report	Sabo 9'; Kuruçuk (yellow card) 17'; Erdem 80'; Sobiech 82'	Stadium: Fenerbahçe Lefter Küçükandonyadis Facilities

== Competitions ==
=== Overview ===
Competition	First match	Last match	Starting round	Final position	Record							
Competition	First match	Last match	Starting round	Final position	Pld	W	D	L	GF	GA	GD	Win %
Süper Lig	11 September 2020	15 May 2021	Matchday 1	3rd	40	25	7	8	72	41	+31	62.50
Turkish Cup	24 November 2020	9 February 2021	Fourth round	Quarter-finals	4	3	0	1	7	2	+5	75.00
Total					44	28	7	9	79	43	+36	63.64

Source: Competitions

=== Süper Lig ===
==== League table ====
Pos	Team	Pld	W	D	L	GF	GA	GD	Pts	Qualification or relegation
1	Beşiktaş (C)	40	26	6	8	89	44	+45	84	Qualification for the Champions League group stage
2	Galatasaray	40	26	6	8	80	36	+44	84	Qualification for the Champions League second qualifying round
3	Fenerbahçe	40	25	7	8	72	41	+31	82	Qualification for the Europa League play-off round
4	Trabzonspor	40	19	14	7	50	37	+13	71	Qualification for the Europa Conference League third qualifying round
5	Sivasspor	40	16	17	7	54	43	+11	65	Qualification for the Europa Conference League second qualifying round

Source: Süper Lig, Soccerway
Rules for classification: 1) Points; 2) Head-to-head points; 3) Head-to-head goal difference; 4) Head-to-head goals scored; 5) Goal difference; 6) Goals scored; 7) Play-off.
(C) Champions

==== Results summary ====
Overall								Home						Away					
Pld	W	D	L	GF	GA	GD	Pts	W	D	L	GF	GA	GD	W	D	L	GF	GA	GD
40	25	7	8	72	41	+31	82	11	2	7	34	25	+9	14	5	1	38	16	+22

Source: TFF.org

Pld = Matches played; W = Matches won; D = Matches drawn; L = Matches lost; GF = Goals for; GA = Goals against; GD = Goal difference; Pts = Points

==== Results by round ====
Round	1	2	3	4	5	6	7	8	9	10	11	12	13	14	15	16	17	18	19	20	21	22	23	24	25	26	27	28	29	30	31	32	33	34	35	36	37	38	39	40	41	42
Ground	A	H	A	H	A	H	A	H	A	H	A	H	A	H	B	A	H	A	H	A	H	H	A	H	A	H	A	H	A	H	A	H	A	H	A	B	H	A	H	A	H	A
Result	W	D	D	W	W	W	W	L	W	L	W	L	L	W	B	W	W	W	W	D	W	W	W	L	W	L	W	D	W	L	D	W	D	W	W	B	W	D	W	W	L	W
Position	9	8	8	2	2	2	1	2	2	3	3	3	3	3	5	4	2	2	2	2	2	1	1	3	3	3	3	3	3	3	3	2	2	2	2	2	2	2	2	2	3	3

Source: TFF.org
A = Away; H = Home; B = Bye; W = Win; D = Draw; L = Loss

==== Matches ====
11 September 2020 1	Çaykur Rizespor	1–2	Fenerbahçe	Rize
20:00 TRT (UTC+3)	Škoda 59'; Morozyuk (yellow card) 85'	Report	Kadıoğlu (yellow card) 40'; Gönül 76'; Gümüş (yellow card) 82'; Sosa 87' (pen.)	Stadium: Çaykur Didi Stadium; Attendance: 0 Referee: Arda Kardeşler; Assistant referees: İsmail Şencan, Hakan Yemişken; Fourth official: Erkan Özdamar

21 September 2020 2	Fenerbahçe	0–0	Hatayspor	Istanbul
20:00 TRT (UTC+3)	Valencia (yellow card) 26'	Report	Pablo (yellow card) 9'; Ribeiro (yellow card) 19' (yellow-red card) 73'; Sackey (yellow card) 56' (yellow-red card) 81'; Abdioğlu (yellow card) 82'	Stadium: Şükrü Saracoğlu Stadium; Attendance: 0 Referee: Ümit Öztürk; Assistant referees: Ali Saygın Ögel, Osman Gökhan Bilir; Fourth official: Yasin Kol

27 September 2020 3	Galatasaray	0–0	Fenerbahçe	Istanbul
19:00 TRT (UTC+3)	Luyindama (yellow card) 15'; Falcao (yellow card) 47'; Turan (yellow card) 61'; Antalyalı (yellow card) 62'; Etebo (yellow card) 82'; Marcão (yellow card) 85'; Belhanda (yellow card) 86'	Report	Sosa (yellow card) 12'; Tisserand (yellow card) 23'; Gönül (yellow card) 69'; Luiz Gustavo (yellow card) 90'	Stadium: Türk Telekom Stadium; Attendance: 0 Referee: Ali Palabıyık; Assistant referees: Serkan Olguncan, Mehmet Cem Satman; Fourth official: Mete Kalkavan

3 October 2020 4	Fenerbahçe	2–1	Fatih Karagümrük	Istanbul
19:00 TRT (UTC+3)	Samatta 24', 68'; Lemos (yellow card) 77' (yellow-red card) 84'	Report	Salibur (yellow card) 54'; Sabo 78' (pen.); Durmaz (yellow card) 90'	Stadium: Şükrü Saracoğlu Stadium; Attendance: 0 Referee: Yaşar Kemal Uğurlu; Assistant referees: Kerem Ersoy, Süleyman Özay; Fourth official: Onur Özütoprak

18 October 2020 5	Göztepe	2–3	Fenerbahçe	İzmir
19:00 TRT (UTC+3)	Guilherme 34', 63'; Ideye (yellow card) 60'; Nwobodo (yellow card) 65'; Mihojević (yellow card) 88'	Report	Sosa 26' (pen.); Luiz Gustavo (yellow card) 41'; Aziz 43', (yellow card) 75'; Pelkas 51'; Bayındır (yellow card) 64'; Erkin (yellow card) 64'	Stadium: Gürsel Aksel Stadium; Attendance: 0 Referee: Atilla Karaoğlan; Assistant referees: Volkan Ahmet Narinç, Serkan Çimen; Fourth official: Sarper Barış Saka

25 October 2020 6	Fenerbahçe	3–1	Trabzonspor	Istanbul
19:00 TRT (UTC+3)	Luiz Gustavo (yellow card) 44'; Pelkas (yellow card) 47'; Asan 51' (o.g.); Valencia 55'; Cissé 72'	Report	Afobe 23'; Asan (yellow card) 78'	Stadium: Şükrü Saracoğlu Stadium; Attendance: 0 Referee: Cüneyt Çakır; Assistant referees: Bahattin Duran, Tarık Ongun; Fourth official: Tugay Kaan Numanoğlu

2 November 2020 7	Antalyaspor	1–2	Fenerbahçe	Antalya
20:00 TRT (UTC+3)	Sarı (yellow card) 37'; Jahović (red card) 45'; Orgill (yellow card) 50'; Podolski 52'	Report	Tufan 49'; Valencia (yellow card) 60'; Perotti 84' (pen.); Gümüş (yellow card) 90+6' (yellow-red card) 90+6'	Stadium: Antalya Stadium; Attendance: 0 Referee: Bahattin Şimşek; Assistant referees: Mehmet Kısal, Mustafa Sönmez; Fourth official: Yiğit Arslan

7 November 2020 8	Fenerbahçe	0–2	Konyaspor	Istanbul
19:00 TRT (UTC+3)	Tufan (yellow card) 68'; Aziz (yellow card) 81'	Report	Šehić (yellow card) 55'; Jevtović 67'; Kravets 77'; Uludağ (yellow card) 84'; Demirbağ (yellow card) 88'	Stadium: Şükrü Saracoğlu Stadium; Attendance: 0 Referee: Ali Şansalan; Assistant referees: Mustafa Emre Eyisoy, Serkan Ok; Fourth official: Kutluhan Bilgiç

21 November 2020 9	Gençlerbirliği	1–5	Fenerbahçe	Ankara
16:00 TRT (UTC+3)	Diego Ângelo 31'; Polomat (yellow card) 52'; Sio (yellow card) 54'; Piris Da Motta (yellow card) 79'	Report	Yandaş 14'; Perotti 38' (pen.), 69'; Sosa 47'; Pelkas (yellow card) 56'; Tufan 72'	Stadium: Eryaman Stadium; Attendance: 0 Referee: Halil Umut Meler; Assistant referees: Cevdet Kömürcüoğlu, İbrahim Çağlar Uyarcan; Fourth official: Ramazan Keleş

29 November 2020 10	Fenerbahçe	3–4	Beşiktaş	Istanbul
19:00 TRT (UTC+3)	Tisserand (yellow card) 15'; Cissé 34'; Pelkas (yellow card) 38'; Yandaş (yellow card) 53'; Luiz Gustavo (yellow card) 63'; Tufan 68', 90+7' (pen.), (yellow card) 90'; Lemos (yellow card) 90+9'	Report	Aboubakar 4', 20'; Larin (yellow card) 20' (yellow-red card) 50'; Uysal 53'; N'Sakala 88'; Rosier (yellow card) 90'; Souza (yellow card) 90+9'	Stadium: Şükrü Saracoğlu Stadium; Attendance: 0 Referee: Tugay Kaan Numanoğlu; Assistant referees: Bahattin Duran, Süleyman Özay; Fourth official: Turgut Doman

6 December 2020 11	Denizlispor	0–2	Fenerbahçe	Denizli
19:00 TRT (UTC+3)	Bergdich (yellow card) 22'; Bakalorz (yellow card) 32'; Rodallega (yellow card) 86'	Report	Cissé 9'; Gönül 40'; Aziz (yellow card) 53' (yellow-red card) 54'; Tufan (yellow card) 55'; Erkin (yellow card) 86'	Stadium: Denizli Atatürk Stadium; Attendance: 0 Referee: Ali Palabıyık; Assistant referees: Kerem Ersoy, Serkan Çimen; Fourth official: Kutluhan Bilgiç

12 December 2020 12	Fenerbahçe	0–3	Yeni Malatyaspor	Istanbul
19:00 TRT (UTC+3)	Yandaş (yellow card) 39'; Gönül (yellow card) 45'; Luiz Gustavo (yellow card) 89'	Report	Büyük 9' (pen.); Bulut 21'; Hafez (yellow card) 45'; Ndayishimiye 48'; Özbir (yellow card) 78'	Stadium: Şükrü Saracoğlu Stadium; Attendance: 0 Referee: Erkan Özdamar; Assistant referees: İsmail Şencan, Ali Saygın Ögel; Fourth official: Emre Malok

19 December 2020 13	Gaziantep	3–1	Fenerbahçe	Gaziantep
19:00 TRT (UTC+3)	Vetrih 10', (yellow card) 67'; Maxim 40' (pen.); Djilobodji (yellow card) 53'; André Sousa (yellow card) 81'; Özer 90+5'	Report	Pelkas 24', (yellow card) 59'; Sangaré (yellow card) 38'; Ademi (yellow card) 90+5'	Stadium: Gaziantep Stadium; Attendance: 0 Referee: Cüneyt Çakır; Assistant referees: Bahattin Duran, Tarık Ongun; Fourth official: Abdullah Buğra Taşkınsoy

23 December 2020 14	Fenerbahçe	4–1	İstanbul Başakşehir	Istanbul
19:00 TRT (UTC+3)	Luiz Gustavo (yellow card) 12', (goal) 84'; Sangaré 45+2'; Erkin (yellow card) 50'; Tisserand 60'; Yandaş 89'	Report	Tekdemir (yellow card) 6', (goal) 61'; Rafael (yellow card) 70' (yellow-red card) 70'; Kahveci (yellow card) 74' (yellow-red card) 74'	Stadium: Şükrü Saracoğlu Stadium; Attendance: 0 Referee: Bahattin Şimşek; Assistant referees: Volkan Ahmet Narinç, İbrahim Bozbey; Fourth official: Hakan Ceylan

15	Bye

4 January 2021 16	Kasımpaşa	0–3	Fenerbahçe	Istanbul
19:00 TRT (UTC+3)	Sadiku (yellow card) 64'; Yıldırım (yellow card) 81'	Report	Thiam 14', 45'; Gümüş (yellow card) 54'; Kadıoğlu 86'	Stadium: Recep Tayyip Erdoğan Stadium; Attendance: 0 Referee: Halis Özkahya; Assistant referees: Serkan Olguncan, Kemal Yılmaz; Fourth official: Burak Şeker

7 January 2021 17	Fenerbahçe	2–1	Alanyaspor	Istanbul
19:00 TRT (UTC+3)	Thiam (yellow card) 5'; Gümüş 12', (yellow card) 59'; Tekin (yellow card) 16'; Tisserand (yellow card) 39'; Pelkas 69'	Report	Davidson (yellow card) 14'; Tzavellas (yellow card) 15'; Kutlu (yellow card) 33'; Marafona (yellow card) 65'; Babacar 81' (pen.)	Stadium: Şükrü Saracoğlu Stadium; Attendance: 0 Referee: Halil Umut Meler; Assistant referees: Mustafa Emre Eyisoy, İlker Takpak; Fourth official: Direnç Tonusluoğlu

11 January 2021 18	BB Erzurumspor	0–3	Fenerbahçe	Erzurum
16:00 TRT (UTC+3)	Çelik (yellow card) 45'	Report	Erkin (yellow card) 45'; Yandaş 45'; Pelkas 48'; Gümüş 51'	Stadium: Kazım Karabekir Stadium; Attendance: 0 Referee: Mete Kalkavan; Assistant referees: Bahattin Duran, Ceyhun Sesigüzel; Fourth official: Onur Özütoprak

18 January 2021 19	Fenerbahçe	3–1	Ankaragücü	Istanbul
19:00 TRT (UTC+3)	Thiam 28', (yellow card) 45'; Samatta 34'; Tufan (yellow card) 41'; Valencia 67'	Report	Çekiçi (yellow card) 45'; Güral 90'	Stadium: Şükrü Saracoğlu Stadium; Attendance: 0 Referee: Arda Kardeşler; Assistant referees: Ali Saygın Ögel, Erdem Bayık; Fourth official: Kutluhan Bilgiç

21 January 2021 20	Sivasspor	1–1	Fenerbahçe	Sivas
19:00 TRT (UTC+3)	Yatabaré 18', (yellow card) 79'; Appindangoyé (yellow card) 45'	Report	Sangaré (yellow card) 27'; Valencia 45' (pen.)	Stadium: 4 Eylül Stadium; Attendance: 0 Referee: Yaşar Kemal Uğurlu; Assistant referees: Serkan Olguncan, Serkan Çimen; Fourth official: Burak Pakkan

25 January 2021 21	Fenerbahçe	3–0	Kayserispor	Istanbul
19:00 TRT (UTC+3)	Valencia (yellow card) 18'; Thiam 20'; Samatta 51'; Pelkas (yellow card) 69'; Cissé 86'	Report	Korkmaz (yellow card) 63'	Stadium: Şükrü Saracoğlu Stadium; Attendance: 0 Referee: Alper Ulusoy; Assistant referees: Kerem Ersoy, Cevdet Kömürcüoğlu; Fourth official: Mustafa Kürşad Filiz

30 January 2021 22	Fenerbahçe	1–0	Çaykur Rizespor	Istanbul
19:00 TRT (UTC+3)	Akkan 45' (o.g.); Aziz (yellow card) 55'	Report	Melnjak (yellow card) 43'; Baiano (yellow card) 63' (yellow-red card) 86'; Boldrin (yellow card) 66'; Fernando (yellow card) 86'	Stadium: Şükrü Saracoğlu Stadium; Attendance: 0 Referee: Abdulkadir Bitigen; Assistant referees: Kemal Yılmaz, Mustafa Savranlar; Fourth official: Kutluhan Bilgiç

2 February 2021 23	Hatayspor	1–2	Fenerbahçe	Hatay
16:00 TRT (UTC+3)	Çaytemel (yellow card) 38'; Ribeiro (yellow card) 50'; Pablo (yellow card) 60'; Boupendza 90', (yellow card) 90'	Report	Thiam 26'; Cissé (yellow card) 73'; Billong 88' (o.g.); Bayındır (yellow card) 90'	Stadium: Antakya Atatürk Stadium; Attendance: 0 Referee: Suat Arslanboğa; Assistant referees: Alpaslan Dedeş, Mehmet Kısal; Fourth official: Bülent Birincioğlu

6 February 2021 24	Fenerbahçe	0–1	Galatasaray	Istanbul
19:00 TRT (UTC+3)	Yandaş (yellow card) 17'; Erkin (yellow card) 90'	Report	Saracchi (yellow card) 28'; Mohamed 54'; Linnes (yellow card) 81'	Stadium: Şükrü Saracoğlu Stadium; Attendance: 0 Referee: Cüneyt Çakır; Assistant referees: Bahattin Duran, Tarık Ongun; Fourth official: Hüseyin Göçek

13 February 2021 25	Fatih Karagümrük	1–2	Fenerbahçe	Istanbul
19:00 TRT (UTC+3)	Borini 67'; Campi (yellow card) 90'	Report	Thiam 19'; Erkin (yellow card) 42'; Valencia 53'	Stadium: Atatürk Olympic Stadium; Attendance: 0 Referee: Halis Özkahya; Assistant referees: Ali Saygın Ögel, İlker Takpak; Fourth official: Murat Erdoğan

21 February 2021 26	Fenerbahçe	0–1	Göztepe	Istanbul
19:00 TRT (UTC+3)	Erkin (yellow card) 82'	Report	Akbunar 9'; Paluli (yellow card) 45+1'; Nwobodo (yellow card) 62'	Stadium: Şükrü Saracoğlu Stadium; Attendance: 0 Referee: Hüseyin Göçek; Assistant referees: Kemal Yılmaz, Süleyman Özay; Fourth official: Alper Çetin

28 February 2021 27	Trabzonspor	0–1	Fenerbahçe	Trabzon
19:00 TRT (UTC+3)	Ekuban (yellow card) 7'	Report	Yandaş (yellow card) 56'; Aziz (yellow card) 72'; Pelkas 76'	Stadium: Medical Park Stadium; Attendance: 0 Referee: Yaşar Kemal Uğurlu; Assistant referees: Serkan Olguncan, Erdinç Sezertam; Fourth official: Ali Şansalan

4 March 2021 28	Fenerbahçe	1–1	Antalyaspor	Istanbul
19:00 TRT (UTC+3)	Szalai (yellow card) 7'; Valencia 83'; Cissé (yellow card) 88'; Kadıoğlu (yellow card) 89'; Pelkas (yellow card) 90+3'; Sosa (yellow card) 90+7'	Report	Fredy 12', (yellow card) 21'; Amilton (yellow card) 33'; Sarı (yellow card) 39'; Naldo (yellow card) 61'; Orgill (yellow card) 89'; Boffin (red card) 90+10'	Stadium: Şükrü Saracoğlu Stadium; Attendance: 0 Referee: Ümit Öztürk; Assistant referees: Serkan Ok, Osman Gökhan Bilir; Fourth official: Mert Güzenge

8 March 2021 29	Konyaspor	0–3	Fenerbahçe	Konya
19:00 TRT (UTC+3)	Diomandé (yellow card) 22'; Demirbağ (yellow card) 25'	Report	Szalai 29'; Osayi-Samuel 32'; Valencia (yellow card) 58'; Samatta (yellow card) 85'; Aziz 90'	Stadium: Konya Büyükşehir Stadium; Attendance: 0 Referee: Fırat Aydınus; Assistant referees: Süleyman Özay, Esat Sancaktar; Fourth official: Bahattin Şimşek

14 March 2021 30	Fenerbahçe	1–2	Gençlerbirliği	Istanbul
19:00 TRT (UTC+3)	Novák 35'; Aziz (yellow card) 62'	Report	Candeias (yellow card) 30'; Aziz 39' (o.g.); Ayité 63'; Yıldırım (yellow card) 65'; Nordfeldt (yellow card) 82'; Lima (yellow card) 89'; Artan (yellow card) 90+1'	Stadium: Şükrü Saracoğlu Stadium; Attendance: 0 Referee: Abdulkadir Bitigen; Assistant referees: Kerem Ersoy, Mustafa Savranlar; Fourth official: Mert Güzenge

21 March 2021 31	Beşiktaş	1–1	Fenerbahçe	Istanbul
19:00 TRT (UTC+3)	Larin (yellow card) 35'; Vida 48'; Ghezzal (yellow card) 90+3'	Report	Samatta (yellow card) 31'; Valencia (yellow card) 47'; Aziz (yellow card) 58'; Sosa (yellow card) 79'; Tufan 89'; Pelkas (yellow card) 90+1'	Stadium: Vodafone Park; Attendance: 0 Referee: Halil Umut Meler; Assistant referees: Mustafa Emre Eyisoy, Cevdet Kömürcüoğlu; Fourth official: Suat Arslanboğa

5 April 2021 32	Fenerbahçe	1–0	Denizlispor	Istanbul
19:00 TRT (UTC+3)	Samatta 64'; Aziz (yellow card) 70'	Report		Stadium: Şükrü Saracoğlu Stadium; Attendance: 0 Referee: Cüneyt Çakır; Assistant referees: Bahattin Duran, Tarık Ongun; Fourth official: Çağdaş Altay

8 April 2021 33	Yeni Malatyaspor	1–1	Fenerbahçe	Malatya
19:00 TRT (UTC+3)	Eskihellaç 35'	Report	Valencia 17'	Stadium: Malatya Stadium; Attendance: 0 Referee: Halis Özkahya; Assistant referees: Hakan Yemişken, İlker Takpak; Fourth official: Onur Özütoprak

12 April 2021 34	Fenerbahçe	3–1	Gaziantep	Istanbul
19:00 TRT (UTC+3)	Yandaş 56', (yellow card) 67'; Valencia 71'; Gönül (yellow card) 90'; Gümüş 90+5'	Report	Roderick (yellow card) 40'; Vetrih (yellow card) 52'; Maxim 65'	Stadium: Şükrü Saracoğlu Stadium; Attendance: 0 Referee: Mete Kalkavan; Assistant referees: Ceyhun Sesigüzel, Serkan Ok; Fourth official: Volkan Bayarslan

18 April 2021 35	İstanbul Başakşehir	1–2	Fenerbahçe	Istanbul
19:00 TRT (UTC+3)	Şahiner 18'; Tekdemir (yellow card) 29' (yellow-red card) 60'; Ndayishimiye (yellow card) 38'; Višća (penalty missed) 88'	Report	Yandaş (yellow card) 18'; Szalai 40'; Pelkas 57'; Valencia (yellow card) 60'; Kadıoğlu (yellow card) 90+3'	Stadium: Başakşehir Fatih Terim Stadium; Attendance: 0 Referee: Cüneyt Çakır; Assistant referees: Bahattin Duran, Tarık Ongun; Fourth official: Çağdaş Altay

36	Bye

25 April 2021 37	Fenerbahçe	3–2	Kasımpaşa	Istanbul
20:30 TRT (UTC+3)	Valencia 15', 45+1' (pen.); Szalai 40'; Kahveci (yellow card) 42'; Tekin (yellow card) 81'	Report	Hajradinović 21'; Thelin (yellow card) 33'; Hadergjonaj 82' (pen.)	Stadium: Şükrü Saracoğlu Stadium; Attendance: 0 Referee: Fırat Aydınus; Assistant referees: Aleks Taşcıoğlu, Erdem Bayık; Fourth official: Onur Özütoprak

29 April 2021 38	Alanyaspor	0–0	Fenerbahçe	Alanya, Antalya
20:30 TRT (UTC+3)	Tzavellas (yellow card) 49'; Kutlu (yellow card) 71'; Bekiroğlu (yellow card) 76'	Report	Gönül (red card) 43'	Stadium: Bahçeşehir Okulları Stadium; Attendance: 0 Referee: Yaşar Kemal Uğurlu; Assistant referees: Serkan Olguncan, Abdullah Bora Özkara; Fourth official: Hakan Ceylan

3 May 2021 39	Fenerbahçe	3–1	BB Erzurumspor	Istanbul
20:30 TRT (UTC+3)	Sosa 6' (pen.); Valencia 12'; Pelkas 14'	Report	Kardeş (yellow card) 5'; Rashani (yellow card) 50'; Uçar (yellow card) 79'; Sert 81'	Stadium: Şükrü Saracoğlu Stadium; Attendance: 0 Referee: Mete Kalkavan; Assistant referees: Ceyhun Sesigüzel, Kerem Ersoy; Fourth official: Mert Güzenge

8 May 2021 40	Ankaragücü	1–2	Fenerbahçe	Ankara
20:30 TRT (UTC+3)	Potuk 3'; Pinto (yellow card) 83'; Šarlija (yellow card) 85'	Report	Tufan 42'; Valencia 90+5'	Stadium: Eryaman Stadium; Attendance: 0 Referee: Fırat Aydınus; Assistant referees: Aleks Taşcıoğlu, Erdem Bayık; Fourth official: Onur Özütoprak

11 May 2021 41	Fenerbahçe	1–2	Sivasspor	Istanbul
20:30 TRT (UTC+3)	Gönül (yellow card) 90'; Cissé 90+2'	Report	Ninga (yellow card) 37'; Kayode 45+1'; Çiftçi (yellow card) 45+1'; Arslan 48'; Yalçın (yellow card) 59'	Stadium: Şükrü Saracoğlu Stadium; Attendance: 0 Referee: Halis Özkahya; Assistant referees: Volkan Ahmet Narinç, Hakan Yemişken; Fourth official: Mert Güzenge

15 May 2021 42	Kayserispor	1–2	Fenerbahçe	Kayseri
20:30 TRT (UTC+3)	Pedro Henrique 18', (yellow card) 88'; Muhar (yellow card) 44'; Parlak (yellow card) 55' (yellow-red card) 89'; Behich (yellow card) 88'	Report	Valencia (yellow card) 7', (goal) 90' (pen.); Erkin (yellow card) 32'; Sosa (penalty missed) 58'; Aziz 90+8'	Stadium: Kadir Has Stadium; Attendance: 0 Referee: Halil Umut Meler; Assistant referees: Cevdet Kömürcüoğlu, İbrahim Çağlar Uyarcan; Fourth official: Onur Özütoprak

=== Turkish Cup ===
24 November 2020 Fourth round	Fenerbahçe	4–0	Sivas Belediyespor	Istanbul
21:00 TRT (UTC+3)	Aziz (yellow card) 25'; Thiam 41', 68'; Pelkas 63'; Ademi 73'	Report	Ayık (yellow card) 10'; Kılıçoğlu (yellow card) 25'	Stadium: Şükrü Saracoğlu Stadium; Referee: Sarper Barış Saka; Assistant referees: Ömer Tevfik Özkoç, Murat Tuğberk Curbay; Fourth official: Mustafa Aydın

16 December 2020 Fifth round	Fenerbahçe	1–0	Karacabey Belediyespor	Istanbul
21:00 TRT (UTC+3)	Özcan 11' (o.g.); Bayındır (red card) 28'; Cissé (yellow card) 76'; Özdoğan (yellow card) 83'; Tufan (yellow card) 90+1'	Report	İlhan (yellow card) 84'	Stadium: Şükrü Saracoğlu Stadium; Referee: Emre Kargın; Assistant referees: Bahtiyar Birinci, Deniz Caneral Özaral; Fourth official: Erkan Engin

14 January 2021 Round of 16	Fenerbahçe	1–0	Kasımpaşa	Istanbul
20:45 TRT (UTC+3)	Samatta (yellow card) 16', (goal) 51'; Erkin (yellow card) 36'; Yandaş (red card) 90'	Report	Haspolat (yellow card) 69'; Hodžić (yellow card) 82'	Stadium: Şükrü Saracoğlu Stadium; Referee: Ümit Öztürk; Assistant referees: Aleks Taşçıoğlu, Deniz Caner Özaral; Fourth official: Yiğit Arslan

9 February 2021 Quarter-finals	Fenerbahçe	1–2 (a.e.t.)	İstanbul Başakşehir	Istanbul
20:45 TRT (UTC+3)	Lemos (red card) 45'; Valencia 72'; Aziz (yellow card) 102'; Tufan (yellow card) 113'; Szalai (yellow card) 120'	Report	Sertel (yellow card) 31'; Fernandes 42'; Sarıkaya (yellow card) 93'; Gulbrandsen 96', (yellow card) 113'; Crivelli (yellow card) 120'	Stadium: Şükrü Saracoğlu Stadium; Referee: Fırat Aydınus; Assistant referees: Aleks Taşçıoğlu, Erdem Bayık; Fourth official: Turgut Doman

== Statistics ==
=== Appearances and goals ===
No.	Pos	Nat	Player	Total		Süper Lig		Turkish Cup	
No.	Pos	Nat	Player	Apps	Goals	Apps	Goals	Apps	Goals
Goalkeepers
1	GK	(Turkey) TUR	Altay Bayındır	35	0	33	0	2	0
15	GK	(Turkey) TUR	Harun Tekin	8	0	6	0	2	0
48	GK	(Turkey) TUR	Oytun Özdoğan	2	0	1	0	1	0
Defenders
3	DF	(Uruguay) URU	Mauricio Lemos	10	0	8	0	2	0
4	DF	(Turkey) TUR	Serdar Aziz	31	3	27	3	4	0
18	DF	(Turkey) TUR	Sadık Çiftpınar	8	0	6	0	2	0
26	DF	(Democratic Republic of the Congo) COD	Marcel Tisserand	25	1	25	1	0	0
35	DF	(Turkey) TUR	Nazım Sangaré	22	1	20	1	2	0
37	DF	(Czech Republic) CZE	Filip Novák	20	1	18	1	2	0
41	DF	(Hungary) HUN	Attila Szalai	22	3	21	3	1	0
77	DF	(Turkey) TUR	Gökhan Gönül	22	2	21	2	1	0
88	DF	(Turkey) TUR	Caner Erkin	37	0	34	0	3	0
Midfielders
5	MF	(Argentina) ARG	José Sosa	36	4	34	4	2	0
7	MF	(Turkey) TUR	Ozan Tufan	41	6	37	6	4	0
8	MF	(Turkey) TUR	Mert Hakan Yandaş	38	4	34	4	4	0
11	MF	(Argentina) ARG	Diego Perotti	4	3	4	3	0	0
14	MF	(Greece) GRE	Dimitrios Pelkas	34	8	32	7	2	1
16	MF	(Netherlands) NED	Ferdi Kadıoğlu	30	1	26	1	4	0
17	MF	(Turkey) TUR	İrfan Kahveci	12	0	12	0	0	0
20	MF	(Brazil) BRA	Luiz Gustavo	37	1	34	1	3	0
21	MF	(England) ENG	Bright Osayi-Samuel	19	1	18	1	1	0
29	MF	(Germany) GER	Sinan Gümüş	20	3	18	3	2	0
30	MF	(Turkey) TUR	Ömer Faruk Beyaz	3	0	1	0	2	0
67	MF	(Germany) GER	Mesut Özil	11	0	10	0	1	0
Forwards
9	FW	(Senegal) SEN	Papiss Cissé	28	5	25	5	3	0
10	FW	(Tanzania) TAN	Mbwana Samatta	30	6	27	5	3	1
13	FW	(Ecuador) ECU	Enner Valencia	35	13	34	12	1	1
27	FW	(Senegal) SEN	Mame Thiam	34	8	30	6	4	2
Players transferred/loaned out during the season
6	MF	(Turkey) TUR	Tolga Ciğerci	4	0	4	0	0	0
11	MF	(Cape Verde) CPV	Garry Rodrigues	0	0	0	0	0	0
17	MF	(Morocco) MAR	Nabil Dirar	0	0	0	0	0	0
19	FW	(Iran) IRN	Allahyar Sayyadmanesh	0	0	0	0	0	0
22	FW	(Switzerland) SUI	Michael Frey	1	0	1	0	0	0
23	MF	(Turkey) TUR	Deniz Türüç	3	0	3	0	0	0
28	DF	(Turkey) TUR	Murat Sağlam	0	0	0	0	0	0
32	DF	(Denmark) DEN	Zanka	2	0	2	0	0	0
99	FW	(Switzerland) SUI	Kemal Ademi	8	1	7	1	1	0

Last updated: 15 May 2021.

=== Goalscorers ===
Rank	No.	Pos	Nat	Player	Süper Lig	Turkish Cup	Total
1	13	FW	(Ecuador)	Enner Valencia	12	1	13
2	14	MF	(Greece)	Dimitrios Pelkas	7	1	8
2	27	FW	(Senegal)	Mame Thiam	6	2	8
4	7	MF	(Turkey)	Ozan Tufan	6	0	6
4	10	FW	(Tanzania)	Mbwana Samatta	5	1	6
6	9	FW	(Senegal)	Papiss Cissé	5	0	5
7	5	MF	(Argentina)	José Sosa	4	0	4
7	8	MF	(Turkey)	Mert Hakan Yandaş	4	0	4
9	4	DF	(Turkey)	Serdar Aziz	3	0	3
9	11	MF	(Argentina)	Diego Perotti	3	0	3
9	29	FW	(Germany)	Sinan Gümüş	3	0	3
9	41	DF	(Hungary)	Attila Szalai	3	0	3
13	77	DF	(Turkey)	Gökhan Gönül	2	0	2
14	16	MF	(Netherlands)	Ferdi Kadıoğlu	1	0	1
14	20	MF	(Brazil)	Luiz Gustavo	1	0	1
14	21	MF	(England)	Bright Osayi-Samuel	1	0	1
14	26	DF	(Democratic Republic of the Congo)	Marcel Tisserand	1	0	1
14	30	DF	(Turkey)	Nazım Sangaré	1	0	1
14	37	DF	(Czech Republic)	Filip Novák	1	0	1
14	99	FW	(Switzerland)	Kemal Ademi	0	1	1
Own goals					3	1	4
Totals					72	7	79

Last updated: 15 May 2021.

=== Assists ===
Rank	No.	Pos	Nat	Player	Süper Lig	Turkish Cup	Total
1	88	DF	(Turkey)	Caner Erkin	9	1	10
2	7	MF	(Turkey)	Ozan Tufan	8	0	8
3	14	MF	(Greece)	Dimitrios Pelkas	7	0	7
4	13	FW	(Ecuador)	Enner Valencia	4	0	4
4	16	MF	(Netherlands)	Ferdi Kadıoğlu	2	2	4
6	5	MF	(Argentina)	José Sosa	3	0	3
7	8	MF	(Turkey)	Mert Hakan Yandaş	1	1	2
7	9	FW	(Senegal)	Papiss Cissé	1	1	2
7	17	MF	(Turkey)	İrfan Kahveci	2	0	2
7	27	FW	(Senegal)	Mame Thiam	2	0	2
11	4	DF	(Turkey)	Serdar Aziz	1	0	1
11	20	MF	(Brazil)	Luiz Gustavo	1	0	1
11	21	MF	(England)	Bright Osayi-Samuel	1	0	1
11	26	DF	(Democratic Republic of the Congo)	Marcel Tisserand	1	0	1
11	29	FW	(Germany)	Sinan Gümüş	1	0	1
11	35	DF	(Turkey)	Nazım Sangaré	1	0	1
11	67	MF	(Germany)	Mesut Özil	1	0	1
11	77	DF	(Turkey)	Gökhan Gönül	1	0	1
11	99	FW	(Switzerland)	Kemal Ademi	1	0	1
Totals					48	5	53

Last updated: 15 May 2021.

=== Clean sheets ===
Rank	No.	Pos	Nat	Player	Süper Lig	Turkish Cup	Total
1	1	GK	(Turkey)	Altay Bayındır	10	2	12
2	15	GK	(Turkey)	Harun Tekin	1	1	2
3	48	GK	(Turkey)	Oytun Özdoğan	0	1	1
Totals					11	4	15

Last updated: 15 May 2021.

=== Disciplinary record ===
No.	Pos	Nat	Player	Süper Lig			Turkish Cup			Total		
No.	Pos	Nat	Player	Booked	(yellow card) (yellow-red card)	Sent off (straight red)	Booked	(yellow card) (yellow-red card)	Sent off (straight red)	Booked	(yellow card) (yellow-red card)	Sent off (straight red)
1	GK	(Turkey)	Altay Bayındır	2	0	0	0	0	1	2	0	1
3	DF	(Uruguay)	Mauricio Lemos	1	1	0	0	0	1	1	1	1
4	DF	(Turkey)	Serdar Aziz	7	1	0	2	0	0	9	1	0
5	MF	(Argentina)	José Sosa	3	0	0	0	0	0	3	0	0
7	MF	(Turkey)	Ozan Tufan	4	0	0	2	0	0	6	0	0
8	MF	(Turkey)	Mert Hakan Yandaş	6	0	0	0	0	1	6	0	1
9	FW	(Senegal)	Papiss Cissé	2	0	0	1	0	0	3	0	0
10	FW	(Tanzania)	Mbwana Samatta	2	0	0	1	0	0	3	0	0
11	MF	(Argentina)	Diego Perotti	0	0	0	0	0	0	0	0	0
13	FW	(Ecuador)	Enner Valencia	7	0	0	0	0	0	7	0	0
14	MF	(Greece)	Dimitrios Pelkas	7	0	0	1	0	0	8	0	0
15	GK	(Turkey)	Harun Tekin	2	0	0	0	0	0	2	0	0
16	MF	(Netherlands)	Ferdi Kadıoğlu	3	0	0	0	0	0	3	0	0
17	MF	(Turkey)	İrfan Kahveci	1	0	0	0	0	0	1	0	0
18	DF	(Turkey)	Sadık Çiftpınar	0	0	0	0	0	0	0	0	0
20	MF	(Brazil)	Luiz Gustavo	6	0	0	1	0	0	7	0	0
21	MF	(England)	Bright Osayi-Samuel	0	0	0	0	0	0	0	0	0
26	DF	(Democratic Republic of the Congo)	Marcel Tisserand	3	0	0	0	0	0	3	0	0
27	FW	(Senegal)	Mame Thiam	2	0	0	0	0	0	2	0	0
29	FW	(Germany)	Sinan Gümüş	3	1	0	0	0	0	3	1	0
30	MF	(Turkey)	Ömer Faruk Beyaz	0	0	0	0	0	0	0	0	0
35	DF	(Turkey)	Nazım Sangaré	2	0	0	0	0	0	2	0	0
37	DF	(Czech Republic)	Filip Novák	0	0	0	0	0	0	0	0	0
41	DF	(Hungary)	Attila Szalai	1	0	0	1	0	0	2	0	0
48	GK	(Turkey)	Oytun Özdoğan	0	0	0	1	0	0	1	0	0
67	MF	(Germany)	Mesut Özil	1	0	0	0	0	0	1	0	0
77	DF	(Turkey)	Gökhan Gönül	4	0	1	0	0	0	4	0	1
88	DF	(Turkey)	Caner Erkin	8	0	0	1	0	0	9	0	0

Last updated: 15 May 2021.
