= 2022–23 Antalyaspor season =

Antalyaspor
2022–23 season
- President: Aziz Çetin (until 14 March 2023); Sabri Gülel (from 14 March 2023)
- Head coach: Nuri Şahin
- Stadium: Antalya Stadium
- Süper Lig: 13th
- Turkish Cup: Round of 16
- Top goalscorer: League: Haji Wright (15); All: Haji Wright (16)
- Highest home attendance: 24,002 (vs. Fenerbahçe, 3 January 2023, Süper Lig)
- Lowest home attendance: 4,663 (vs. Ankaragücü, 23 December 2022, Süper Lig)
- Average home league attendance: 10,413
- Biggest win: 4–0 (vs. Kayserispor (H), 11 March 2023, Süper Lig)
- Biggest defeat: 2–5 (vs. Gaziantep (A), 26 August 2022, Süper Lig); 0–3 (vs. Adana Demirspor (H), 17 September 2022, Süper Lig)
Home colours	Away colours	Third colours

The 2022–23 season was the 57th season in the existence of Antalyaspor and the club's 27th consecutive season in the top flight of Turkish football. In addition to the domestic league, Antalyaspor participated in this season's editions of the Turkish Cup.

== Kits ==
Antalyaspor's 2022–23 kits, manufactured by Nike, released on 2 July 2022 and were up for sale on the same day.

Supplier: Nike / Main sponsor: VavaCars / Sleeve sponsor: Corendon Airlines / Back sponsor: Anex Tour / Short sponsor: Kırbıyık Holding, Doruk Yapım / Socks sponsor: Bitexen

Home	Away	Third	Fourth

== Players ==
=== First-team squad ===
As of 24 February 2023

Note: Flags indicate national team as defined under FIFA eligibility rules; some limited exceptions apply. Players may hold more than one non-FIFA nationality.

No.	Pos.	Nation	Player
1	GK	TUR	Alperen Uysal
2	DF	NED	Sherel Floranus
3	DF	TUR	Cemali Sertel
4	DF	KOS	Amar Gërxhaliu
5	DF	TUR	Emrecan Uzunhan (on loan from Beşiktaş)
6	MF	MKD	Erdal Rakip
7	DF	TUR	Bünyamin Balcı
8	MF	BRA	Fernando
9	FW	USA	Haji Wright
11	DF	TUR	Güray Vural
13	DF	RUS	Fyodor Kudryashov
14	FW	SUI	Admir Mehmedi
16	MF	ANG	Fredy
17	FW	TUR	Bertuğ Yıldırım (on loan from Hatayspor)
18	FW	SEN	Alassane Ndao (on loan from Al Ahli)

No.	Pos.	Nation	Player
19	MF	GER	Ufuk Akyol
20	FW	SWE	Sam Larsson
21	DF	TUR	Ömer Toprak
22	FW	JPN	Shoya Nakajima
26	DF	UKR	Mark Mampassi (on loan from Lokomotiv Moscow)
27	FW	ALG	Houssam Ghacha
28	DF	COD	Christian Luyindama (on loan from Galatasaray)
29	MF	TUR	Mevlüt Han Ekelik
35	GK	TUR	Ataberk Dadakdeniz
38	MF	TUR	Mustafa Erdilman
70	FW	TUR	Doğukan Sinik (on loan from Hull City)
77	FW	GER	Sinan Gümüş
89	DF	TUR	Veysel Sarı
90	GK	BRA	Helton Leite
99	MF	HUN	Bálint Szabó (on loan from Paks)

== Transfers ==
=== In ===
Date	Position	Nationality	Player	From	Fee
17 June 2022	MF	(Turkey)	Soner Aydoğdu	(Turkey) İstanbul Başakşehir	Free
17 June 2022	GK	(Turkey)	Alperen Uysal	(Turkey) İstanbulspor	Free
1 July 2022	DF	(Turkey)	Ömer Toprak	(Germany) Werder Bremen	Free
1 July 2022	FW	(Argentina)	Gustavo Blanco Leschuk	(Spain) Eibar	End of loan
1 July 2022	MF	(Turkey)	Mert Yılmaz	(Turkey) Bursaspor	End of loan
1 July 2022	MF	(Germany)	Ersin Zehir	(Netherlands) Dordrecht	End of loan
1 July 2022	MF	(Turkey)	Erkan Eybil	(Germany) VfB Stuttgart II	End of loan
1 July 2022	DF	(Turkey)	Cengiz Demir	(Turkey) Akhisarspor	End of loan
1 July 2022	MF	(Turkey)	Mert Çölgeçen	(Turkey) Arnavutköy Belediyespor	End of loan
18 July 2022	FW	(Sweden)	Sam Larsson	(China) Dalian Professional	Free
19 July 2022	FW	(United States)	Haji Wright	(Denmark) SønderjyskE	Undisclosed
24 July 2022	FW	(Senegal)	Alassane Ndao	(Saudi Arabia) Al-Ahli	Loan
27 July 2022	DF	(Turkey)	Cemali Sertel	(Turkey) İstanbul Başakşehir	Loan
8 September 2022	FW	(Japan)	Shoya Nakajima	(Portugal) Porto	Free
8 September 2022	DF	(Democratic Republic of the Congo)	Christian Luyindama	(Turkey) Galatasaray	Loan
12 January 2023	FW	(Turkey)	Doğukan Sinik	(England) Hull City	Loan
20 January 2023	MF	(North Macedonia)	Erdal Rakip	(Sweden) Malmö FF	Free
20 January 2023	GK	(Brazil)	Helton Leite	(Portugal) S.L. Benfica	Free
8 February 2023	MF	(Hungary)	Bálint Szabó	(Hungary) Paks	Loan
9 February 2023	DF	(Turkey)	Emrecan Uzunhan	(Turkey) Beşiktaş	Loan
10 February 2023	DF	(Ukraine)	Mark Mampassi	(Russia) Lokomotiv Moscow	Loan
17 February 2023	FW	(Turkey)	Bertuğ Yıldırım	(Turkey) Hatayspor	Loan

=== Out ===
Date	Position	Nationality	Player	To	Fee
1 July 2022	DF	(Turkey)	Cengiz Demir	(Turkey) Hatayspor	Free
1 July 2022	DF	(Brazil)	Naldo	(Saudi Arabia) Al Taawoun	End of contract
1 July 2022	GK	(Turkey)	Melih Enes Uygun	(Turkey) Bodrumspor	End of contract
3 July 2022	MF	(Turkey)	Harun Alpsoy	(Turkey) Bodrumspor	Free
8 July 2022	DF	(Turkey)	Bahadır Öztürk	(Turkey) Çaykur Rizespor	Loan
17 July 2022	DF	(Turkey)	Mert Yılmaz	(Turkey) Ümraniyespor	Loan
20 July 2022	FW	(Turkey)	Doğukan Sinik	(England) Hull City	Undisclosed
6 August 2022	MF	(Italy)	Andrea Poli	(Italy) Modena	Mutual agreement
5 September 2022	GK	(Portugal)	Diogo Sousa	(Turkey) Bodrumspor	Loan
7 September 2022	MF	(Bosnia and Herzegovina)	Deni Milošević	(Turkey) Sakaryaspor	Loan
11 January 2023	FW	(Turkey)	Gökdeniz Bayrakdar	(Turkey) Bodrumspor	Loan
13 January 2023	GK	(Turkey)	Doğukan Özkan	(Turkey) Pazarspor	Loan
26 January 2023	MF	(Turkey)	Soner Aydoğdu	(Turkey) Samsunspor	Transfer
20 February 2023	MF	(Brazil)	Luiz Adriano	(Brazil) Internacional	Transfer
24 February 2023	MF	(Belgium)	Ruud Boffin	Retired	

== Pre-season and friendlies ==
Win Draw Loss Fixtures

=== Pre-season ===
7 July 2022 Friendly	Antalyaspor (Turkey)	0–1	(Ukraine) Metalist Kharkiv	Burdur, Turkey
17:00 TRT (UTC+3)		Report	Tankovskyi 82'	Stadium: Spor Toto MAKU Stadium

10 July 2022 Friendly	İstanbul Başakşehir (Turkey)	0–0	(Turkey) Antalyaspor	Burdur, Turkey
18:00 TRT (UTC+3)		Report		Stadium: Spor Toto MAKU Stadium

14 July 2022 Friendly	Antalyaspor (Turkey)	2–0	(Turkey) Bodrumspor	Burdur, Turkey
17:00 TRT (UTC+3)	Bayrakdar 36'; Gümüş 48'	Report		Stadium: Spor Toto MAKU Stadium

23 July 2022 Friendly	VfL Bochum (Germany)	6–2	(Turkey) Antalyaspor	Bochum, Germany
15:30 CEST (UTC+2)	Ordets 41'; Zoller 45'; Asano 56', 58'; Osei-Tutu 75'; Holtmann 77'	Report	Ghacha 16'; Wright 68'	Stadium: Ruhrstadion

26 July 2022 Friendly	SC Paderborn (Germany)	1–0	(Turkey) Antalyaspor	Paderborn, Germany
13:00 CEST (UTC+2)	Srbeny 29'	Report		Stadium: Trainings- und Nachwuchsleistungszentrums

30 July 2022 Friendly	Borussia Dortmund (Germany)	1–1	(Turkey) Antalyaspor	Dortmund, Germany
17:00 CEST (UTC+2)	Brandt 8'	Report	Ndao 60'	Stadium: BVB-Fußballpark Hohenbuschei

=== Mid-season ===
30 November 2022 Friendly	Antalyaspor (Turkey)	1–2	(Israel) Maccabi Tel Aviv	Antalya, Turkey
15:00 TRT (UTC+3)	Mehmedi 73'	Report	Vural 45+1' (o.g.); Gloukh 80'	Stadium: Kaya Palazzo Golf Resort

7 December 2022 Friendly	Antalyaspor (Turkey)	2–3	(Italy) Napoli	Antalya, Turkey
20:45 TRT (UTC+3)	Mehmedi 55'; Özmert 86'	Report	Raspadori 8', 61'; Politano 15'	Stadium: Antalya Stadium; Referee: Feridun Daldaş

16 December 2022 Friendly	Antalyaspor (Turkey)	2–3	(Turkey) Fatih Karagümrük	Antalya, Turkey
17:00 TRT (UTC+3)	Ghacha 29'; Viviano 39' (o.g.)	Report	Kazim-Richards 10'; Baniya 45'; Diagne 64'	Stadium: Fanatic Tour Topkapi & Kremlin Palace Football Center

== Competitions ==
=== Overall record ===
Competition	First match	Last match	Starting round	Final position	Record							
Competition	First match	Last match	Starting round	Final position	Pld	W	D	L	GF	GA	GD	Win %
Süper Lig	7 August 2022	7 June 2023	Matchday 1	13th	36	11	8	17	46	55	−9	30.56
Turkish Cup	9 November 2022	17 January 2023	Fourth round	Round of 16	3	2	0	1	4	2	+2	66.67
Total					39	13	8	18	50	57	−7	33.33

Source: Soccerway

=== Süper Lig ===
==== League table ====
Pos	Team	Pld	W	D	L	GF	GA	GD	Pts
11	Ankaragücü	36	12	6	18	43	53	−10	42
12	İstanbulspor	36	12	5	19	47	63	−16	41 (Note: Head-to-head points: İstanbulspor 11, Antalyaspor 10, Sivasspor 8, Alanyaspor 4.)
13	Antalyaspor	36	11	8	17	46	55	−9	41
14	Sivasspor	36	11	8	17	46	54	−8	41
15	Alanyaspor	36	11	8	17	54	70	−16	41

Source: Süper Lig
Rules for classification: 1) Points; 2) Head-to-head points; 3) Head-to-head goal difference; 4) Head-to-head goals scored; 5) Goal difference; 6) Goals scored; 7) Play-off.

==== Results summary ====
Overall								Home						Away					
Pld	W	D	L	GF	GA	GD	Pts	W	D	L	GF	GA	GD	W	D	L	GF	GA	GD
36	11	8	17	46	55	−9	41	8	3	7	31	26	+5	3	5	10	15	29	−14

Source: See Results

Pld = Matches played; W = Matches won; D = Matches drawn; L = Matches lost; GF = Goals for; GA = Goals against; GD = Goal difference; Pts = Points

==== Results by round ====
Round	1	2	3	4	5	6	7	8	9	10	11	12	13	14	15	16	17	18	19	20	21	22	23	24	25	26	27	28	29	30	31	32	33	34	35	36	37	38
Ground	H	A	H	A	H	A	H	B	H	A	H	A	H	A	H	A	H	A	H	A	H	A	H	A	H	A	B	A	H	A	H	A	H	A	H	A	H	A
Result	L	W	W	L	L	L	L	B	D	L	W	W	W	D	L	L	L	D	D	L	W	L	W	L	W	L	B	D	W	D	L	W	L	D	D	L	W	L
Position	15	9	5	10	10	12	14	15	16	16	14	12	9	9	11	12	14	14	14	14	12	13	12	12	10	10	13	13	10	11	13	12	12	12	13	14	12	13

Source: Competitive matches
A = Away; H = Home; B = Bye; W = Win; D = Draw; L = Loss

==== Matches ====
7 August 2022 1	Antalyaspor	0–1	Galatasaray	Antalya
21:45 TRT (UTC+3)	Toprak (yellow card) 43'; Luiz Adriano (penalty missed) 45+4'; Kudryashov (yellow card) 90+5'	Report	Nelsson (yellow card) 14'; Kutlu (yellow card) 45'; Muslera (yellow card) 45+2'; Gomis 90', (yellow card) 90+3'	Stadium: Antalya Stadium; Attendance: 20,085; Referee: Atilla Karaoğlan

14 August 2022 2	Ümraniyespor	0–1	Antalyaspor	Istanbul
19:15 TRT (UTC+3)	Geraldo (yellow card) 57'	Report	Wright 59'; Aydoğdu (yellow card) 66'; Fernando (yellow card) 81'	Stadium: Atatürk Olympic Stadium; Attendance: 386; Referee: Çağdaş Altay

20 August 2022 3	Antalyaspor	5–2	Trabzonspor	Antalya
21:45 TRT (UTC+3)	Fernando 14'; Larsson (yellow card) 17'; Wright 40' (pen.), 90+8'; Bayrakdar 81', 90+6'	Report	Haspolat (yellow card) 32'; Bardhi 45+5', 73'; Denswil (yellow card) 60'	Stadium: Antalya Stadium; Attendance: 14,285; Referee: Volkan Bayarslan

26 August 2022 4	Gaziantep	5–2	Antalyaspor	Hatay
21:00 TRT (UTC+3)	Figueiredo 28', 54', 73', (yellow card) 71'; Pekhart 58'; Maxim (yellow card) 66'; Djilobodji (yellow card) 67'; Sagal 67'	Report	Wright 30', 40'; Fernando (yellow card) 58'; Aydoğdu (yellow card) 90+3'	Stadium: New Hatay Stadium; Attendance: 688; Referee: Suat Arslanboğa

4 September 2022 5	Antalyaspor	0–2	Kasımpaşa	Antalya
21:45 TRT (UTC+3)	Özmert (yellow card) 86'; Vural (yellow card) 88'; Fredy (red card) 90+7'	Report	Gemicibaşi (yellow card) 20'; Ben Ouanes (yellow card) 29'; Hadergjonaj 45+6' (pen.); Celina (yellow card) 57'; Sertel 61' (o.g.); Hajradinović (yellow card) 80'; Engin (yellow card) 90+10'	Stadium: Antalya Stadium; Attendance: 8,490; Referee: Kadir Sağlam

11 September 2022 6	Kayserispor	1–0	Antalyaspor	Kayseri
20:00 TRT (UTC+3)	Thiam 54'; Cardoso (yellow card) 76'; Carole (yellow card) 89'	Report	Kudryashov (yellow card) 77'; Vural (yellow card) 90+2'	Stadium: Kadir Has Stadium; Attendance: 6,888; Referee: Bahattin Şimşek

17 September 2022 7	Antalyaspor	0–3	Adana Demirspor	Antalya
20:00 TRT (UTC+3)	Aydoğdu (red card) 8'; Nakajima (red card) 61'; Vural (yellow card) 69'	Report	Belhanda 1'; Rodrigues (yellow card) 20'; Rakitskyi (red card) 39'; Gulbrandsen 75', (yellow card) 90'; Assombalonga 84', (yellow card) 85'	Stadium: Antalya Stadium; Attendance: 10,907; Referee: Ali Palabıyık

8	Bye

8 October 2022 9	Antalyaspor	1–1	Konyaspor	Antalya
17:00 TRT (UTC+3)	Fernando 51', (yellow card) 82'; Luiz Adriano (yellow card) 63'; Gümüş (yellow card) 65'; Vural (yellow card) 90+6'	Report	Calvo (yellow card) 30', (goal) 90+6'; Murić (yellow card) 55'; Demirbağ (yellow card) 82'; Ülgün (yellow card) 87'	Stadium: Antalya Stadium; Attendance: 8,826; Referee: Mert Güzenge

14 October 2022 10	Alanyaspor	3–2	Antalyaspor	Antalya
20:00 TRT (UTC+3)	Karaca (yellow card) 25'; Hassan 44'; Lusamba 51'; Doumbia 70', (yellow card) 79'	Report	Ghacha (yellow card) 29'; Wright 57', 87'; Özmert (yellow card) 79'	Stadium: Kırbıyık Holding Stadium; Attendance: 4,336; Referee: Yaşar Kemal Uğurlu

21 October 2022 11	Antalyaspor	2–1	İstanbulspor	Antalya
20:00 TRT (UTC+3)	Wright (yellow card) 33'; Fernando 45+2'; Larsson (yellow card) 64'; Ghacha (yellow card) 68'; Sarı 90+7'	Report	Mehremić 26'; Yeşil (yellow card) 45'; Rroca (yellow card) 50' (yellow-red card) 61'; Jensen (yellow card) 71'; Erdoğan (yellow card) 89'; Sarıkaya (yellow card) 90+5'	Stadium: Antalya Stadium; Attendance: 7,735; Referee: Ümit Öztürk

31 October 2022 12	Sivasspor	0–2	Antalyaspor	Sivas
20:00 TRT (UTC+3)	Arslan (yellow card) 3'; Gradel (yellow card) 49'	Report	Sarı (yellow card) 10'; Yeşilyurt 18' (o.g.); Wright 24'; Uysal (yellow card) 84'	Stadium: New Sivas 4 Eylül Stadium; Attendance: 3,612; Referee: Mete Kalkavan

6 November 2022 13	Antalyaspor	4–2	Fatih Karagümrük	Antalya
17:00 TRT (UTC+3)	Wright 35'; Vural 41', 84'; Sarı 45+2'; Aydoğdu (yellow card) 90+5'	Report	Colley 4'; Diagne 19'; Viviano (yellow card) 30'; Shukurov (yellow card) 50'; Ozdoyev (yellow card) 55'	Stadium: Antalya Stadium; Attendance: 8,798; Referee: Abdulkadir Bitigen

26 February 2023 14	Beşiktaş	0–0	Antalyaspor	Istanbul
20:00 TRT (UTC+3)	Redmond (yellow card) 57'; Tosun (penalty missed) 90+7'	Report	Vural (yellow card) 45+3'; Mehmedi (yellow card) 56'; Floranus (yellow card) 86'	Stadium: Vodafone Park
Note: Match originally scheduled for 13 November 2022, but postponed on the same day due to the 2022 Istanbul bombing earlier in the day. The match was postponed for the second time due to the 2023 Turkey–Syria earthquake. It was announced that the postponed match will be played on 26 February 2023.

23 December 2022 15	Antalyaspor	0–2	Ankaragücü	Antalya
20:00 TRT (UTC+3)	Luiz Adriano (yellow card) 43'; Fernando (yellow card) 81'	Report	Radaković (yellow card) 45+3'; Jesé 64'; Güngördü (yellow card) 87'; Sowe 90+11'	Stadium: Antalya Stadium; Attendance: 4,663; Referee: Ali Şansalan

27 December 2022 16	İstanbul Başakşehir	2–0	Antalyaspor	Istanbul
17:00 TRT (UTC+3)	Tekdemir (yellow card) 33'; Türüç 57'; Aleksić 66'; Duarte (yellow card) 82'	Report	Balcı (yellow card) 66'; Kudryashov (yellow card) 88'	Stadium: Başakşehir Fatih Terim Stadium; Attendance: 833; Referee: Halil Umut Meler

3 January 2023 17	Antalyaspor	1–2	Fenerbahçe	Antalya
20:00 TRT (UTC+3)	Wright 14'; Fernando (yellow card) 26'; Fredy (yellow card) 35'; Vural (yellow card) 61'; Bayrakdar (yellow card) 90+10'	Report	Aziz (yellow card) 6'; Batshuayi 55', 62' (pen.); Alioski (yellow card) 87'	Stadium: Antalya Stadium; Attendance: 24,002; Referee: Kadir Sağlam

7 January 2023 18	Hatayspor	0–0	Antalyaspor	Hatay
16:00 TRT (UTC+3)	Yıldırım (yellow card) 64'; Vranješ (yellow card) 85'	Report	Sertel (yellow card) 49'; Sarı (yellow card) 58'	Stadium: New Hatay Stadium; Attendance: 3,937; Referee: Yasin Kol

14 January 2023 19	Antalyaspor	2–2	Giresunspor	Antalya
13:30 TRT (UTC+3)	Sinik 4'; Luiz Adriano 59'; Fernando (red card) 61'; Sertel (yellow card) 82'; Akyol (yellow card) 90+11'; Kudryashov (yellow card) 90+13'	Report	Sainz 40'; Bajić 79'; Savićević (yellow card) 90+8'; Uludağ (yellow card) 90+11'; Serginho (yellow card) 90+13'; Pérez (yellow card) 90+13'	Stadium: Antalya Stadium; Attendance: 4,889; Referee: Yaşar Kemal Uğurlu

21 January 2023 20	Galatasaray	2–1	Antalyaspor	Istanbul
19:00 TRT (UTC+3)	Icardi 49'; Floranus 59' (o.g.); Oliveira (yellow card) 90+3'; Bardakcı (yellow card) 90+10'	Report	Vural (yellow card) 15'; Luiz Adriano 54', (red card) 90+10'; Larsson (yellow card) 60'; Balcı (yellow card) 90+2'	Stadium: Nef Stadium; Attendance: 46,684; Referee: Ali Şansalan

28 January 2023 21	Antalyaspor	3–2	Ümraniyespor	Antalya
19:00 TRT (UTC+3)	Sinik (yellow card) 30'; Larsson 38'; Vural 48'; Sarı (yellow card) 76'; Fredy 90+3', (yellow card) 90+4'	Report	Nayir 33'; Ayık 56'; Sekidika (yellow card) 84'	Stadium: Antalya Stadium; Attendance: 9,443; Referee: Direnç Tonusluoğlu

1 February 2023 22	Trabzonspor	2–0	Antalyaspor	Trabzon
20:00 TRT (UTC+3)	Trézéguet 34'; Bakasetas (yellow card) 40'; Ünüvar 90+4'	Report		Stadium: Şenol Güneş Sports Complex; Attendance: 24,016; Referee: Mete Kalkavan

4 February 2023 23	Antalyaspor	1–0	Gaziantep	Antalya
19:00 TRT (UTC+3)	Fredy 29', (yellow card) 56'; Larsson (yellow card) 34'; Fernando (yellow card) 45+4'	Report	Soyalp (yellow card) 2'; Güvenç (yellow card) 78'; Marković (yellow card) 85' (yellow-red card) 90'; Ersoy (yellow card) 90+2'	Stadium: Antalya Stadium; Attendance: 8,139; Referee: Burak Pakkan

6 March 2023 24	Kasımpaşa	3–1	Antalyaspor	Istanbul
20:00 TRT (UTC+3)	Chouiar 22', (yellow card) 44'; Koita 39'; Eysseric (yellow card) 45+2'; Malsa 60'	Report	Fernando 45' (pen.), (yellow card) 90+4'	Stadium: Recep Tayyip Erdoğan Stadium; Attendance: 1,357; Referee: Cihan Aydın
Note: Originally scheduled for 10 February 2023. Postponed after the 2023 Turkey–Syria earthquake. Rescheduled to 6 March 2023.

11 March 2023 25	Antalyaspor	4–0	Kayserispor	Antalya
16:00 TRT (UTC+3)	Wright 33', 68'; Fredy 52'; Yıldırım 90+7'	Report		Stadium: Antalya Stadium; Attendance: 5,145; Referee: Volkan Bayarslan
Note: Originally scheduled for 19 February 2023. Postponed after the 2023 Turkey–Syria earthquake. Rescheduled to 11 March 2023.

18 March 2023 26	Adana Demirspor	2–0	Antalyaspor	Adana
16:00 TRT (UTC+3)	Çetin (yellow card) 17'; Akbaba 33'; Ndiaye 45+2', (penalty missed) 59'	Report	Sarı (yellow card) 57'; Toprak (yellow card) 61'	Stadium: New Adana Stadium; Attendance: 7,982; Referee: Bahattin Şimşek

27	Bye

7 April 2023 28	Konyaspor	1–1	Antalyaspor	Konya
20:30 TRT (UTC+3)	Demir 24'; Guilherme (yellow card) 87'; Calvo (yellow card) 90+3'	Report	Wright 45'; Fredy (yellow card) 57'; Uzunhan (yellow card) 90+3'; Ghacha (yellow card) 90+10'	Stadium: Konya Metropolitan Municipality Stadium; Attendance: 7,455; Referee: Direnç Tonusluoğlu

14 April 2023 29	Antalyaspor	3–1	Alanyaspor	Antalya
20:30 TRT (UTC+3)	Sinik (yellow card) 15', (goal) 27'; Fernando (yellow card) 23'; Ndao 39'; Yıldırım 85'	Report	Hassan 21'; Doumbia (yellow card) 73'; Güneş (red card) 82'	Stadium: Antalya Stadium; Attendance: 8,396; Referee: Tugay Kaan Numanoğlu

19 April 2023 30	İstanbulspor	3–3	Antalyaspor	Istanbul
17:00 TRT (UTC+3)	Rroca 6'; Lokilo (yellow card) 31'; Ba 45', (yellow card) 63'; Ethemi (yellow card) 47'; Ergün 55', (yellow card) 90'; Aksu (yellow card) 74'; Duhaney (yellow card) 84'; Jensen (yellow card) 87'; Deli (yellow card) 90+9'	Report	Fernando 42'; Wright 51', 88' (pen.); Fredy (yellow card) 79'	Stadium: Esenyurt Necmi Kadıoğlu Stadium; Attendance: 623; Referee: Yiğit Arslan

24 April 2023 31	Antalyaspor	1–2	Sivasspor	Antalya
20:00 TRT (UTC+3)	Larsson 48'	Report	Yatabaré 4', (yellow card) 29'; Gradel 22' (pen.); Vural (yellow card) 73'	Stadium: Antalya Stadium; Attendance: 7,587; Referee: Abdulkadir Bitigen

29 April 2023 32	Fatih Karagümrük	0–1	Antalyaspor	Istanbul
16:00 TRT (UTC+3)	Bertolacci (yellow card) 59'	Report	Sinik 21'	Stadium: Atatürk Olympic Stadium; Attendance: 502; Referee: Halil Umut Meler

6 May 2023 33	Antalyaspor	1–3	Beşiktaş	Antalya
19:00 TRT (UTC+3)	Fernando (yellow card) 22'; Toprak 32'; Balcı (red card) 82'	Report	Aboubakar 54', 89'; Tosun 84'	Stadium: Antalya Stadium; Attendance: 17,988; Referee: Mete Kalkavan

17 May 2023 34	Ankaragücü	1–1	Antalyaspor	Ankara
20:00 TRT (UTC+3)	Kılınç (yellow card) 71'; Milson 90+3'	Report	Sinik (yellow card) 44'; Vural (yellow card) 64', (goal) 68'; Rakip (yellow card) 82'	Stadium: Eryaman Stadium; Attendance: 12,141; Referee: Ümit Öztürk

21 May 2023 35	Antalyaspor	0–0	İstanbul Başakşehir	Antalya
19:00 TRT (UTC+3)		Report	Biglia (yellow card) 73'; Kaygısız (yellow card) 90+3'	Stadium: Antalya Stadium; Attendance: 7,655; Referee: Cihan Aydın

30 May 2023 36	Fenerbahçe	2–0	Antalyaspor	Istanbul
20:00 TRT (UTC+3)	Valencia 2'; Kahveci (yellow card) 46'; Zajc 90+5'	Report	Rakip (yellow card) 17'; Balcı (yellow card) 57'; Sarı (yellow card) 88'	Stadium: Şükrü Saracoğlu Stadium; Referee: Zorbay Küçük

37	Antalyaspor	3–0 (w/o)	Hatayspor	Antalya
		Report		Stadium: Antalya Stadium
Note: Hatayspor withdrew from the league due to the 2023 Turkey–Syria earthquake and Antalyaspor, therefore, were awarded a 3–0 win.

7 June 2023 38	Giresunspor	2–0	Antalyaspor	Giresun
20:00 TRT (UTC+3)	Campuzano (yellow card) 12'; Bajić 17' (pen.); Sainz 59', (yellow card) 51' (yellow-red card) 60'	Report	Ghacha (yellow card) 35'	Stadium: Çotanak Sports Complex; Referee: Kadir Sağlam

=== Turkish Cup ===
9 November 2022 Fourth round	Antalyaspor	3–0	Pendikspor	Antalya
17:00 TRT (UTC+3)	Luiz Adriano 9', 33'; Aydoğdu 45+1'	Report	Tekdal (yellow card) 35'; Aksoy (yellow card) 38'	Stadium: Antalya Stadium; Referee: Oğuzhan Aksu

20 December 2022 Fifth round	Antalyaspor	1–0	Manisa	Antalya
17:00 TRT (UTC+3)	Wright 77' (pen.)	Report	Karapo (yellow card) 75'	Stadium: Antalya Stadium; Referee: Tugay Kaan Numanoğlu

17 January 2023 Round of 16	Antalyaspor	0–2 (a.e.t.)	Kayserispor	Antalya
17:30 TRT (UTC+3)		Report	Ackah (yellow card) 47'; Cardoso (yellow card) 53', (goal) 105'; Kocaman (yellow card) 59'; Balcı 120'	Stadium: Akdeniz University Stadium; Referee: Cihan Aydın

== Statistics ==
=== Goalscorers ===
Rank	No.	Pos	Nat	Player	Süper Lig	Turkish Cup	Total
1	9	FW	(United States)	Haji Wright	15	1	16
2	8	MF	(Brazil)	Fernando	5	0	5
2	10	FW	(Brazil)	Luiz Adriano	2	2	4
2	11	DF	(Turkey)	Güray Vural	4	0	4
5	16	MF	(Angola)	Fredy	3	0	3
5	70	FW	(Turkey)	Doğukan Sinik	3	0	3
7	17	FW	(Turkey)	Bertuğ Yıldırım	2	0	2
7	17	FW	(Turkey)	Gökdeniz Bayrakdar	2	0	2
7	20	FW	(Sweden)	Sam Larsson	2	0	2
7	89	DF	(Turkey)	Veysel Sarı	2	0	2
11	5	MF	(Turkey)	Soner Aydoğdu	0	1	1
11	18	FW	(Senegal)	Alassane Ndao	1	0	1
11	21	DF	(Turkey)	Ömer Toprak	1	0	1
Own goals					1	0	1
Awarded					3	0	3
Totals					46	4	50
