= Altay Bayındır =

Turkish footballer (born 1998)

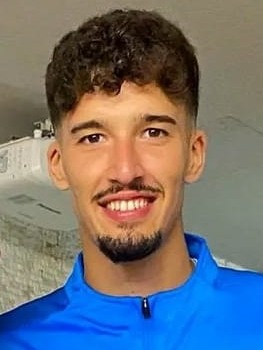
- Bayındır in 2021

Personal information
- Full name: Altay Bayındır
- Date of birth: 14 April 1998 (age 28)
- Place of birth: Osmangazi, Turkey
- Height: 1.98 m (6 ft 6 in)
- Position: Goalkeeper

Team information
- Current team: Celta (on loan from Manchester United)
- Number: 1

Youth career
- 2007–2011: Bursaspor
- 2011–2012: Arabayatağıspor
- 2012–2013: Bursa Yolspor
- 2013–2016: Ankaragücü

Senior career*
Years	Team	Apps	(Gls)
2016–2019	Ankaragücü	28	(0)
2019–2023	Fenerbahçe	116	(0)
2023–	Manchester United	10	(0)
2026–	→ Celta (loan)	0	(0)

International career^{‡}
2014	Turkey U17	1	(0)
2017	Turkey U19	1	(0)
2018	Turkey U20	2	(0)
2018–2020	Turkey U21	10	(0)
2021–	Turkey	14	(0)
- * Club domestic league appearances and goals as of 15:48, 27 September 2025 (UTC) ‡ National team caps and goals as of 10:49, 30 September 2026 (UTC)

Altay Bayındır (born 14 April 1998) is a Turkish professional footballer who plays as a goalkeeper for La Liga club Celta Vigo, on loan from Premier League club Manchester United, and the Turkey national team.

Bayındır began his career at Ankaragücü. He joined Fenerbahçe in July 2019, where he made 145 appearances for the club, winning the Turkish Cup in 2023. In September 2023, he signed for English club Manchester United.

Bayındır played 14 times for Turkey at youth international level. He made his senior international debut in May 2021.

== Club career ==
=== Ankaragücü ===
Bayındır made his Süper Lig debut for Ankaragücü in a 1–1 draw with Çaykur Rizespor on 30 November 2018.

=== Fenerbahçe ===
On 8 July 2019, Bayındır joined fellow Turkish club Fenerbahçe on a four-year contract. He was promoted as first-choice goalkeeper, ahead of teammate Harun Tekin. On 19 August, he made his Fenerbahçe debut in a 5–0 win against Gaziantep at Şükrü Saracoğlu Stadium.

On 3 October 2020, Bayındır saved a penalty from Erik Sabo in a week 4 encounter against Fatih Karagümrük which ended 2–1 to Fenerbahçe. On 6 December, he saved another penalty, from Radosław Murawski, in a week 11 encounter against Denizlispor which Fenerbahçe won 2–0. He produced total of seven saves during this game, in which Fenerbahçe were down to 10-men following the sending-off of Serdar Aziz.

On 30 October 2021, in a 2–1 away defeat to Konyaspor, Bayındır was injured in a collision with Serdar Gürler in the 69th-minute and left the field, being replaced by Berke Özer. The following day, Fenerbahçe made an announcement, saying: “Although no fracture was detected in Altay Bayındır’s shoulder, acromioclavicular separation was observed. It has been decided that our player will undergo surgery and his treatment has started.” It was estimated that he would be unavailable for approximately three months.

On 18 March 2023, Bayındır extended his contract, which was due to expire in the summer of that year, until 2027. On 17 April, he had a lumbar hernia surgery.

=== Manchester United ===
On 1 September 2023, Bayındır joined Premier League club Manchester United on an initial four-year deal, with an option to extend his contract for a further season, making him the first Turkish player to sign for the club. The transfer fee was reported to be £4.3 million. He made his debut on 28 January 2024 in a 4–2 away win against Newport County in the FA Cup.

Bayındır was named as the starting goalkeeper for the FA Cup match against Arsenal on 12 January 2025, where he made a crucial save from Martin Ødegaard's penalty on the 72nd minute. The match headed to the penalty shoot-out after a 1–1 draw after playing for 120 minutes. He made a crucial save against Kai Havertz's attempt as Manchester United made it to the fourth round. He was awarded as the Man of the Match after his performance.

On 13 April 2025, Bayındır was named in the starting line-up for Manchester United's clash vs Newcastle United as number 1, being his first Premier League match for the club. The game ended 4–1 to Newcastle, with goals from Sandro Tonali, Alejandro Garnacho, Harvey Barnes and Bruno Guimarães.

Bayındır started the 2025–26 season ahead of previous first-choice goalkeeper André Onana, who was ultimately loaned out to Trabzonspor. Bayındır eventually returned to a backup role in October, after the emergence of Senne Lammens as United's first-choice goalkeeper.

==== Loan to Celta Vigo ====
On 7 August 2026, Bayındır joined La Liga club Celta Vigo on a season-long loan.

== International career ==
=== Youth ===
Bayındır represented the Turkey under-20 team at the 2018 Toulon Tournament.

=== Senior ===
Bayındır was called-up to the senior Turkey national team by Şenol Güneş on 9 November 2020, for UEFA Nations League encounters against Hungary and Russia. He made his senior international debut on 27 May 2021, in a friendly against Azerbaijan.

On 2 June 2026, Bayındır was selected in the 26-man squad for the 2026 FIFA World Cup.

== Career statistics ==
=== Club ===
As of match played 13 November 2026

Appearances and goals by club, season and competition
Club	Season	League			National cup (Note: Includes Turkish Cup, FA Cup, Copa del Rey)		League cup (Note: Includes EFL Cup)		Europe		Other		Total	
Club	Season	Division	Apps	Goals	Apps	Goals	Apps	Goals	Apps	Goals	Apps	Goals	Apps	Goals
Ankaragücü	2015–16	TFF Second League	2	0	0	0	—		—		—		2	0
Ankaragücü	2016–17	TFF Second League	1	0	0	0	—		—		—		1	0
Ankaragücü	2017–18	TFF First League	8	0	1	0	—		—		—		9	0
Ankaragücü	2018–19	Süper Lig	17	0	2	0	—		—		—		19	0
Ankaragücü	Total		28	0	3	0	—		—		—		31	0
Fenerbahçe	2019–20	Süper Lig	32	0	3	0	—		—		—		35	0
Fenerbahçe	2020–21	Süper Lig	33	0	2	0	—		—		—		35	0
Fenerbahçe	2021–22	Süper Lig	24	0	0	0	—		7 (Note: Five appearances in UEFA Europa League, two appearances in UEFA Europa Conference League)	0	—		31	0
Fenerbahçe	2022–23	Süper Lig	26	0	1	0	—		13 (Note: Two appearances in UEFA Champions League, eleven appearances in UEFA Europa League)	0	—		40	0
Fenerbahçe	2023–24	Süper Lig	1	0	—		—		3 (Note: Appearances in UEFA Europa Conference League)	0	—		4	0
Fenerbahçe	Total		116	0	6	0	—		23	0	—		145	0
Manchester United	2023–24	Premier League	0	0	1	0	0	0	0	0	—		1	0
Manchester United	2024–25	Premier League	4	0	1	0	3	0	2 (Note: Appearances in UEFA Europa League)	0	0	0	10	0
Manchester United	2025–26	Premier League	6	0	0	0	0	0	—		—		6	0
Manchester United	2026–27	Premier League	0	0	0	0	0	0	0	0	—		0	0
Manchester United	Total		10	0	2	0	3	0	2	0	0	0	17	0
Celta Vigo (loan)	2026–27	La Liga	0	0	1	0	—		0	0	—		1	0
Career total			154	0	12	0	3	0	25	0	0	0	194	0

=== International ===
As of match played 28 September 2026

Appearances and goals by national team and year
National team	Year	Apps	Goals
Turkey	2021	2	0
Turkey	2022	3	0
Turkey	2023	3	0
Turkey	2024	2	0
Turkey	2025	1	0
Turkey	2026	3	0
Total		14	0

== Honours ==
MKE Ankaragücü

- TFF Second League: 2016–17

Fenerbahçe

- Turkish Cup: 2022–23

Manchester United

- FA Cup: 2023–24
- UEFA Europa League runner-up: 2024–25

Individual

- Süper Lig Best Goalkepper: 2020–21
