= Mert Hakan Yandaş =

Turkish footballer (born 1994)

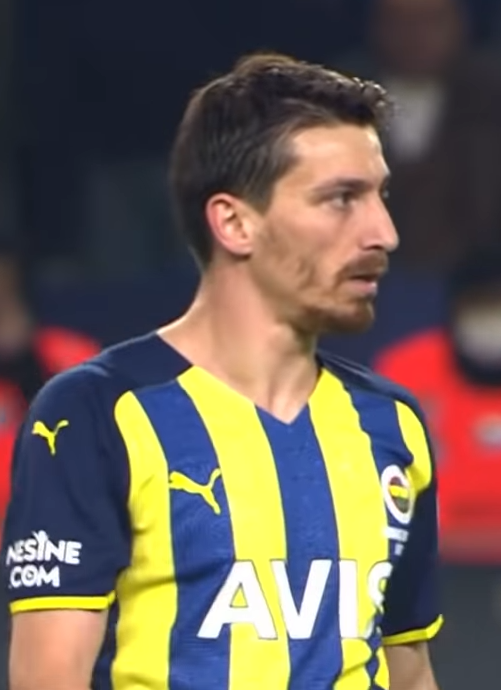
- Yandaş with Fenerbahçe in 2022

Personal information
- Full name: Mert Hakan Yandaş
- Date of birth: 19 August 1994 (age 32)
- Place of birth: Osmangazi, Turkey
- Height: 1.74 m (5 ft 9 in)
- Positions: Attacking midfielder; central midfielder

Team information
- Current team: Fenerbahçe
- Number: 8

Youth career
- 2006–2011: Bursa Güven
- 2011–2012: Yeşil Bursa

Senior career*
Years	Team	Apps	(Gls)
2012–2013	Yeşil Bursa	17	(1)
2013–2015	Altınordu	4	(0)
2014–2015	→ Tirespor 1922 (loan)	25	(13)
2015–2016	Tirespor 1922	34	(21)
2016–2017	Menemen Belediyespor	35	(12)
2017–2020	Sivasspor	63	(7)
2020–	Fenerbahçe	105	(6)

International career^{‡}
2020	Turkey	1	(0)
- * Club domestic league appearances and goals as of 8 November 2026 ‡ National team caps and goals as of 3 September 2020

Mert Hakan Yandaş (born 19 August 1994) is a Turkish professional footballer who plays as an attacking midfielder for Süper Lig club Fenerbahçe.

== Professional career ==
=== Early career ===
Born in Bursa, he lost his father when he was only 9 years old. His father was also an amateur football player and in an interview, he said that he grew up in a family that loved football and that he promised his father to be a football player when he was little.

He spent part of his youth in Bursa Güven and Yeşil Bursa and his first season as a senior in amateur football. Mert Hakan made his first professional contract with Altınordu.

In the 2014–15 season, he loaned to Tire 1922. He made a very strong start with new coach Taha Evke in there and became one of the key players who took more responsibility on the field, scored 13 goals in 25 TFF Third League matches. He signed with them a permanent contract for the 2015–16 season, where has been top goalscorer with 21 goals (in 34 matches) in 2015–16 TFF Third League season.

In the 2016–17 season, he transferred to TFF Second League side Menemen Belediyespor where he played with Serkan Çalık, Erman Kılıç, Gökhan Ünal and İbrahim Dağaşan.

=== Sivasspor ===
Mert Hakan Yandaş joined Süper Lig side Sivasspor on 14 July 2017, after a couple successful seasons in the lower Turkish leagues with Tirespor 1922 and Menemen Belediyespor.

He made his professional debut for Sivasspor in a 2–0 Süper Lig win over Yeni Malatyaspor on 19 August 2017. On 21 September 2017, he scored his first goal with the team against Bugsaşspor in a 3–0 win Turkish Cup match.

=== Fenerbahçe ===
On 11 August 2020, Yandaş transferred to Süper Lig powerhouse Fenerbahçe on a free transfer, signed four years deal. On 21 September 2020, he made his debut in a 0–0 tie against Hatayspor in 2020–21 Süper Lig season. On 21 November 2020, he scored his first goal against Gençlerbirliği in Süper Lig match, netting the first goal in a 5–1 away game victory.

In the 2021–22 season, Yandaş was made vice-captain after Altay Bayındır and Mesut Özil. On 16 September 2021, he made his continental debut in his career against Eintracht Frankfurt in UEFA Europa League away game which finished 1–1. On 4 November 2021, he captained Fenerbahçe for the first time in a 3–0 UEFA Europa League win over Royal Antwerp, where he also scored a goal from outside the box.

On 23 August 2023, Yandaş made his 100th appearances in all competitions for Fenerbahçe against Twente in 5–1 UEFA Europa Conference League play-off round victory. On 21 June 2024, Fenerbahçe extended his contract for two years. On 16 February 2025, he made his 100th Süper Lig appearances for Fenerbahçe against Kasımpaşa in a 3–1 home win.

On 5 August 2025, Yandaş became captain of Fenerbahçe, but lost his role to Milan Škriniar due to his betting allegations.

== Betting investigation ==
As part of an investigation conducted by the Istanbul Chief Public Prosecutor's Office and known to the public as the “Football Betting Investigations”, he was detained on 5 December 2025, after it was determined that he had placed bets on legal betting sites through another person. On 27 February, an indictment has been prepared against him, seeking a prison sentence ranging from 4 to 13 years. On 3 April, the court issued a release order for him.

== International career ==
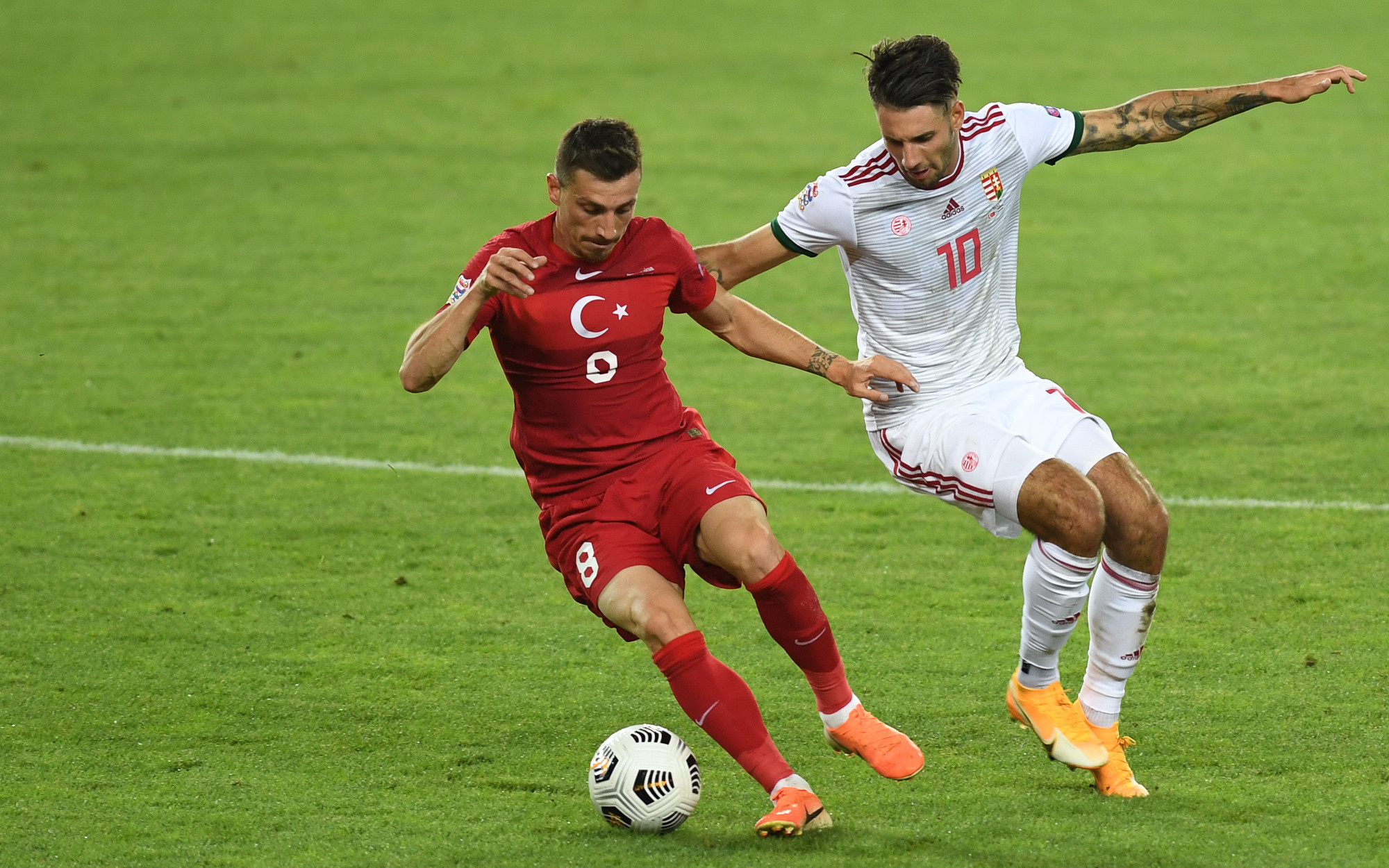
Yandaş (left) in the international match against Hungary (3 September 2020)

Without any youth international experience, Yandaş made his debut with the Turkey national football team in a 1-0 UEFA Nations League loss to Hungary on 3 September 2020.

== Playing style ==
Yandaş is a modern midfielder known for his strong passing and shots from outside the box. He is known for his good technique. He plays mainly as an attacking or a central midfielder but can also operate in several other positions and has been used as a deeper creative midfield position and on occasion, a box-to-box role, winger or second striker. He is often described by pundits as modern day advanced playmakers due to his technique, skill, athleticism, work-rate off the ball, vision, crossing accuracy, wide range of passing, and powerful long-range shooting ability with either foot.

His nickname is Commandante to his combative nature and dominance on the field.

== Career statistics ==
=== Club ===
As of 8 November 2026.

Appearances and goals by club, season and competition
Club	Season	League			Turkish Cup		Continental		Other		Total	
Club	Season	Division	Apps	Goals	Apps	Goals	Apps	Goals	Apps	Goals	Apps	Goals
Yeşil Bursa	2012–13	TFF Third League	17	1	0	0	—		—		17	1
Altınordu	2013–14	TFF Second League	4	0	0	0	—		—		4	0
Tire 1922 (loan)	2014–15	TFF Third League	25	13	1	1	—		—		26	14
Tire 1922	2015–16	TFF Third League	34 (Note: Two appearances in TFF 3. Lig Play-offs)	21	2	0	—		—		36	21
Tire 1922	Total		59	34	3	1	0	0	0	0	62	35
Menemen Belediyespor	2016–17	TFF Second League	35 (Note: Two appearances and two goals in TFF 2. Lig Play-offs)	12	7	4	—		—		42	16
Sivasspor	2017–18	Süper Lig	22	1	4	2	—		—		26	3
Sivasspor	2018–19	Süper Lig	9	0	0	0	—		1 (Note: Appearance in U21 Ligi)	1	10	1
Sivasspor	2019–20	Süper Lig	32	6	5	4	—		—		37	10
Sivasspor	Total		63	7	9	6	0	0	1	1	73	14
Fenerbahçe	2020–21	Süper Lig	34	4	4	0	—		—		38	4
Fenerbahçe	2021–22	Süper Lig	24	0	2	0	7 (Note: Five appearances and one goal in UEFA Europa League, two appearances and one goal in UEFA Europa Conference League)	2	—		33	2
Fenerbahçe	2022–23	Süper Lig	15	0	5	0	4 (Note: Appearances in UEFA Europa League)	0	—		24	0
Fenerbahçe	2023–24	Süper Lig	16	2	3	1	8 (Note: Appearances in UEFA Conference League)	0	0	0	27	3
Fenerbahçe	2024–25	Süper Lig	13	0	3	1	11 (Note: Three appearances in UEFA Champions League, eight appearances in UEFA Europa League)	0	—		27	1
Fenerbahçe	2025–26	Süper Lig	0	0	0	0	0	0	—		0	0
Fenerbahçe	2026–27	Süper Lig	3	0	0	0	0	0	—		3	0
Fenerbahçe	Total		105	6	17	2	30	2	0	0	152	10
Career total			283	60	36	13	30	2	1	1	350	76

=== International ===
As of match played 3 September 2020.

Appearances and goals by national team and year
National team	Year	Apps	Goals
Turkey
Turkey	2020	1	0
Total		1	0

== Honours ==
Altınordu

- TFF 2. Lig: 2013–14

Fenerbahçe

- Turkish Cup: 2022–23
- Turkish Super Cup: 2025
