= Alperen Uysal =

Turkish footballer (born 1994)

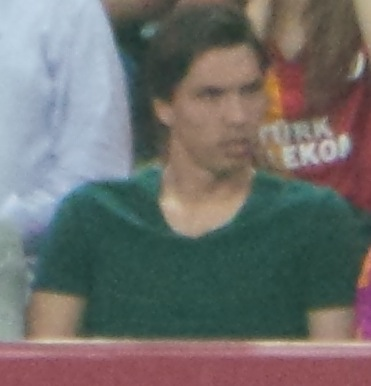
- Alperen Uysal in 2014.

Personal information
- Full name: Muhammed Alperen Uysal
- Date of birth: 1 January 1994 (age 32)
- Place of birth: Balıkesir, Turkey
- Height: 1.92 m (6 ft 4 in)
- Position: Goalkeeper

Team information
- Current team: Vanspor
- Number: 1

Youth career
- 2004–2006: Yenisanayispor
- 2004–2015: Galatasaray

Senior career*
Years	Team	Apps	(Gls)
2013–2016	Galatasaray	0	(0)
2015–2016	→ Gaziantepspor (loan)	1	(0)
2016–2018	Çaykur Rizespor	0	(0)
2018–2022	İstanbulspor	128	(0)
2022–2023	Antalyaspor	10	(0)
2023–2024	Manisa	21	(0)
2024	Şanlıurfaspor	11	(0)
2024–2025	Manisa	37	(0)
2025–2026	Sarıyer	17	(0)
2026–	Vanspor	13	(0)

International career
2008–2009	Turkey U15	7	(0)
2008	Turkey U16	2	(0)
2009–2010	Turkey U18	18	(0)
2010–2011	Turkey U18	2	(0)
2011–2012	Turkey U19	4	(0)
2012–2014	Turkey U20	11	(0)
2014–2016	Turkey U21	3	(0)
- * Club domestic league appearances and goals as of 7 November 2026

Muhammed Alperen Uysal (born 1 January 1994) is a Turkish professional footballer who plays as a goalkeeper for TFF 1. Lig club Vanspor..

== Career ==
Uysal started his youth career at Galatasaray, where he trained with Fernando Muslera under Claudio Taffarel. On 6 August 2015, he joined Gaziantepspor on a one-year loan. He made his professional debut for Gaziantepspor in a 4–0 loss to Beşiktaş 2 April 2016.

On 15 August 2016, Uysal joined Çaykur Rizespor on a free transfer, signing a three-year contract. Galatasaray retained a 50% of any future transfer.

On 27 January 2018, he joined İstanbulspor on a free transfer, signing a 4.5 year contract.

On 7 June 2022, Uysal joined Antalyaspor on a free transfer, signing a two-year contract, with an optional third year. After leaving Antalyaspor, he joined Manisa on a free transfer, signing a one-year contract.

== Career statistics ==
=== Club ===
As of 28 November 2023

Appearances and goals by club, season and competition
Club	Season	League			National Cup		Total	
Club	Season	Division	Apps	Goals	Apps	Goals	Apps	Goals
Gaziantepspor	2015–16	Süper Lig	1	0	4	0	5	0
Çaykur Rizespor	2016–17	Süper Lig	0	0	2	0	2	0
İstanbulspor	2018–19	TFF First League	30	0	2	0	32	0
İstanbulspor	2019–20	TFF First League	31	0	1	0	32	0
İstanbulspor	2020–21	TFF First League	29	0	0	0	29	0
İstanbulspor	2021–22	TFF First League	38	0	0	0	38	0
İstanbulspor	Total		128	0	3	0	131	0
Antalyaspor	2022–23	Süper Lig	10	0	2	0	12	0
Manisa	2023–24	TFF First League	13	0	0	0	13	0
Career total			152	0	11	0	163	0
