= Hasan Hatipoğlu =

Turkish footballer

Personal information
- Date of birth: 19 July 1989 (age 37)
- Place of birth: Alaşehir, Turkey
- Height: 1.85 m (6 ft 1 in)
- Position: Defender

Team information
- Current team: Şanlıurfaspor
- Number: 5

Youth career
- 2004: Çağlayanspor
- 2004–2007: Manisaspor
- 2007–2008: Manisa FK
- 2008–2009: Ayvalıkgücü

Senior career*
Years	Team	Apps	(Gls)
2009–2011	Afyonkarahisarspor	84	(7)
2011–2016	Balıkesirspor	60	(1)
2011–2012	→ Batman Petrolspor (loan)	29	(2)
2016	Boluspor	15	(2)
2016–2017	Sivasspor	14	(0)
2017–2018	Samsunspor	16	(0)
2018–2019	Altınordu	47	(0)
2019–2021	BB Erzurumspor	53	(4)
2021–2022	Kocaelispor	1	(0)
2022–2023	Pendikspor	30	(2)
2023–2025	Iğdır	50	(6)
2025	Adanaspor	12	(0)
2025–2026	Kahramanmaraş İstiklalspor	30	(1)
2026–	Şanlıurfaspor	4	(0)
- * Club domestic league appearances and goals as of 1 October 2026

Hasan Hatipoğlu (born 19 July 1989) is a Turkish professional footballer who plays as a defender for TFF 2. Lig club Şanlıurfaspor.

== Career ==
Hatipoğlu spent most of his career in the amateur leagues of Turkey, with a brief stint in the Süper Lig with Balıkesirspor. Hatipoğlu made his professional debut with Balıkesirspor in a 2-2 Süper Lig tie with Eskişehirspor on 3 November 2014. In 2020, he helped BB Erzurumspor get promoted into the Süper Lig.
