= Mevlüt Han Ekelik =

Turkish footballer

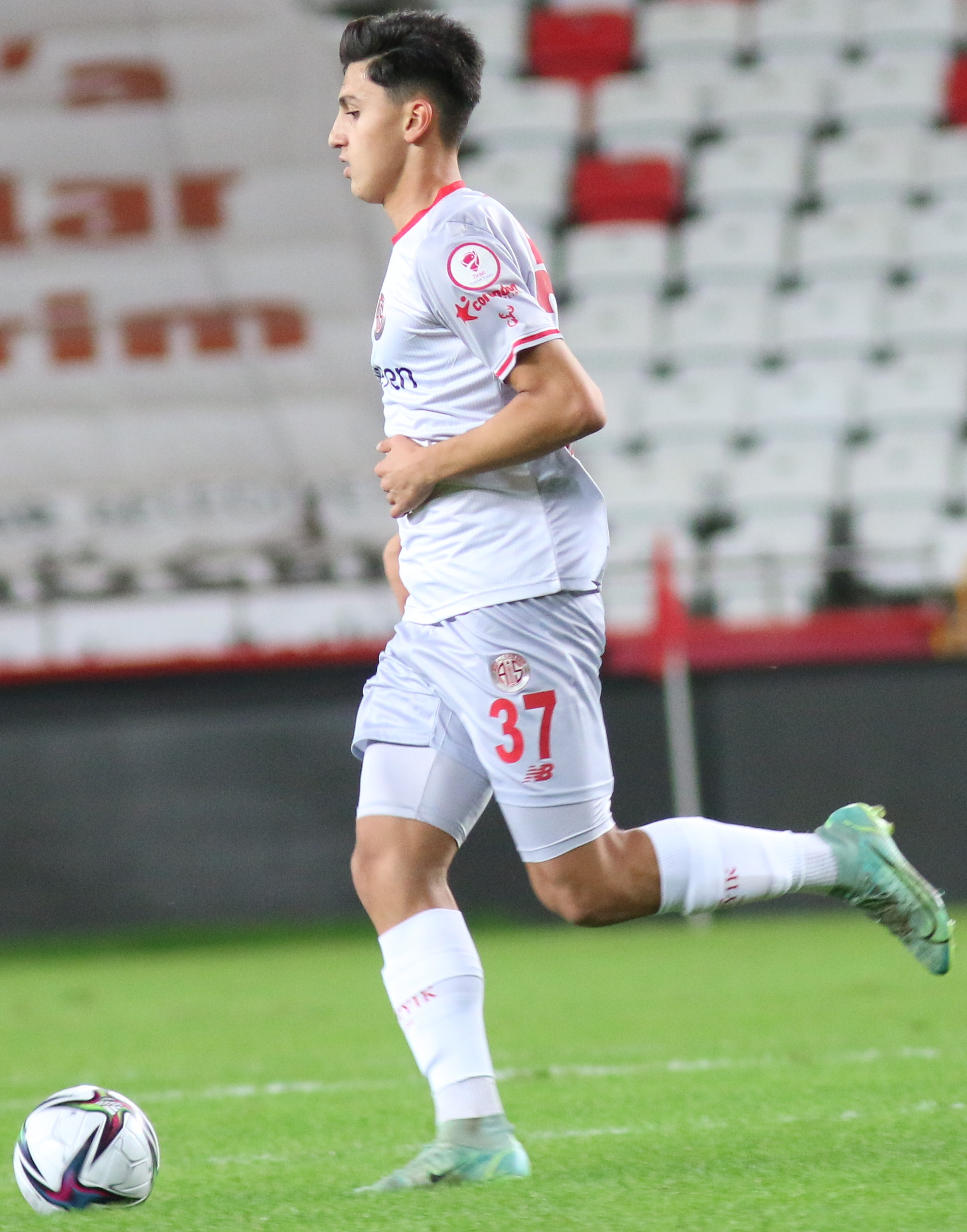

Personal information
- Date of birth: 16 December 2004 (age 21)
- Place of birth: Antalya, Turkey
- Height: 1.82 m (6 ft 0 in)
- Position: Midfielder

Team information
- Current team: İnkılap FSK
- Number: 8

Youth career
- 2014–2017: Aslansaray
- 2017–2019: Antalyaspor

Senior career*
Years	Team	Apps	(Gls)
2019–2025	Antalyaspor	4	(0)
2025–	İnkılap FSK	0	(0)

International career
2019–2020	Turkey U16	6	(0)
2021–2022	Turkey U18	3	(0)
2022	Turkey U19	3	(0)
- * Club domestic league appearances and goals as of 8 November 2025

Mevlüt Han Ekelik (born 16 December 2004) is a Turkish professional footballer who plays as a midfielder for TFF 3. Lig club İnkılap FSK.

== Professional career ==
Ekelik made his professional debut with Antalyaspor in a 2-2 Süper Lig tie with Galatasaray on 24 July 2020, at the age of 15. In doing so, he became the fourth youngest debutant in the history of the Süper Lig.
