= Özgür Sert =

Turkish footballer

Personal information
- Date of birth: 11 January 2001 (age 25)
- Place of birth: Erzurum, Turkey
- Height: 1.80 m (5 ft 11 in)
- Position: Leftback

Team information
- Current team: Şanlıurfaspor
- Number: 25

Youth career
- 2012–2018: Yakutiyespor
- 2018–2020: Yeni Malatyaspor

Senior career*
Years	Team	Apps	(Gls)
2020–2026	Erzurumspor	66	(4)
2022	→ Turgutluspor (loan)	2	(0)
2025	→ Yeni Mersin İY (loan)	12	(2)
2025–2026	→ Mardin 1969 (loan)	18	(3)
2026–	Şanlıurfaspor	2	(0)
- * Club domestic league appearances and goals as of 1 October 2026

Özgür Sert (born 11 January 2001) is a Turkish professional footballer who plays as a leftback for TFF 2. Lig club Şanlıurfaspor.

== Professional career ==
Sert made his professional debut with BB Erzurumspor in a 4-1 Turkish Cup loss to Alanyaspor on 14 January 2021. He debuted in the Süper Lig in a 3–1 loss to Fenerbahçe, scoring his side's only goal in his debut.
