= Serhat Ahmetoğlu =

Turkish footballer (born 2002)

Personal information
- Date of birth: 5 February 2002 (age 24)
- Place of birth: Küçükçekmece, Turkey
- Height: 1.84 m (6 ft 0 in)
- Position: Winger

Team information
- Current team: Sarıyer
- Number: 77

Youth career
- 2012–2014: Eyüpspor
- 2014–2021: Fenerbahçe

Senior career*
Years	Team	Apps	(Gls)
2021–2022	Fenerbahçe	0	(0)
2021–2022	→ Fatih Karagümrük (loan)	12	(0)
2022–	Sarıyer	4	(0)

International career
2016	Turkey U15	2	(1)
2019	Turkey U18	2	(0)
- * Club domestic league appearances and goals as of 15 October 2022

Serhat Ahmetoğlu (born 5 February 2002) is a Turkish professional footballer who plays as a winger for TFF Second League club Sarıyer.

== Club career ==
On 24 November 2020, Ahmetoğlu signed his first professional contract with Fenerbahçe. Ahmetoğlu made his professional debut with Fenerbahçe in a 1–0 Turkish Cup win over Kasımpaşa S.K. on 14 January 2021. On 18 January 2021, he signed on loan with Fatih Karagümrük. He debuted with Fatih Karagümrük in the Süper Lig in a 4–1 loss to Beşiktaş J.K. on 21 January 2021.

== International career ==
Ahmetoğlu is a youth international for Turkey, having represented the Turkey U15s and U18s.
