= Şanlıurfaspor =

Turkish sports club

- Full name: Şanlıurfa Spor Kulübü
- Nickname: Ceylanlar (The Gazelles)
- Founded: 1969; 57 years ago
- Ground: Şanlıurfa 11 Nisan Stadium, Urfa
- Capacity: 21,541
- President: Hasan Avcı
- Head coach: Ahmet Yıldırım
- League: TFF 2. Lig
- 2025–26: TFF 2. Lig, White, 5th of 19
- Website: www.sanliurfaspor.org
Home colours	Away colours	Third colours

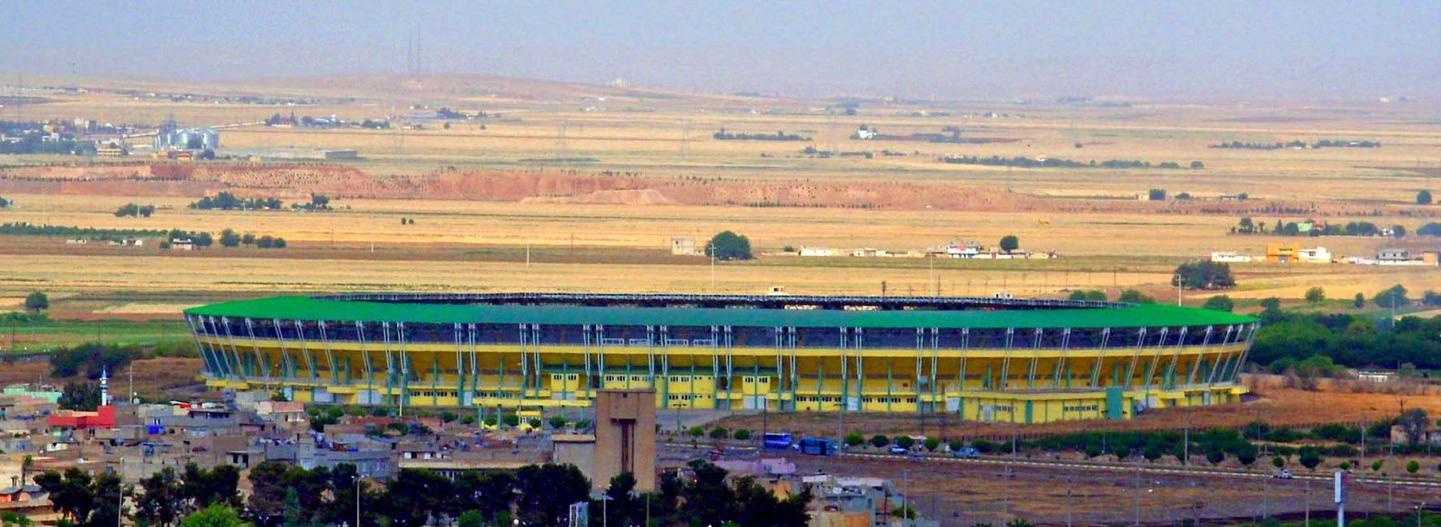
The 11 Nisan Stadium, formerly known as Şanlıurfa GAP Arena (2009)

Şanlıurfaspor is a Turkish sports club located in Urfa. The football team currently plays in the TFF 2. Lig.

== Current squad ==
As of 1 October 2026

Note: Flags indicate national team as defined under FIFA eligibility rules; some limited exceptions apply. Players may hold more than one non-FIFA nationality.

No.	Pos.	Nation	Player
1	GK	TUR	Ahmet Güneş
3	DF	TUR	Alper Tursun
4	MF	TUR	Muhammed Gönülaçar
5	DF	TUR	Hasan Hatipoğlu
6	DF	TUR	Umut Mert Toy
7	FW	TUR	Oğuzhan Doğan
8	MF	TUR	Ferhan Evren
9	FW	TUR	Burak Işık
10	MF	TUR	Çekdar Orhan
11	FW	TUR	Ali Aydemir
14	MF	TUR	Özcan Aydın
16	MF	TUR	Yiğitali Bayrak
17	FW	TUR	Ahmet Karademir (on loan from Pendikspor)
19	FW	TUR	Tahsin Bülbül (on loan from Samsunspor)
20	GK	TUR	Abdülkadir Sünger
23	MF	TUR	Sedat Dursun

No.	Pos.	Nation	Player
25	MF	TUR	Özgür Sert
27	DF	TUR	İlker Günaslan
35	GK	TUR	Baran Demir (on loan from Bodrum)
39	DF	TUR	İbrahim Sürgülü
52	FW	TUR	Hüsamettin Yener
55	DF	TUR	Metehan Ataşsalar
63	MF	TUR	Mahmut Küçük
66	MF	TUR	Cebrail İrtürk (on loan from Muğlaspor)
70	DF	TUR	Fatih Ekinc
75	FW	TUR	Eyüp Özel
77	DF	TUR	Aslan Gök
99	FW	TUR	Sinan Kurumuş
-	GK	TUR	Oytun Özdoğan
-	GK	TUR	Aydın Bağ
-	MF	TUR	İbrahim Egemen Uğurlu

== Honours ==
- TFF Second League
  - Winners (1): 2011–2012
- TFF Third League
  - Winners (3): 1976–1977, 1988–1989, 1994–1995

== League participations ==
- TFF First League: 1977–1985, 1989–1990, 1995–2001, 2012–2017, 2023–2025,
- TFF Second League: 1969–1977, 1985–1989, 1990–1995, 2001–2012, 2017–2023, 2025–

== Former players ==
- (Turkey) Samet Akaydin
- (Turkey) Koray Avcı
- (Austria) Ekrem Dağ
- (Portugal) Edinho
- (Turkey) Batuhan Karadeniz
- (Democratic Republic of the Congo) Lomana LuaLua
- (Turkey) Fahri Tatan
- (Chile) Rodrigo Tello
- (Turkey) Serdar Özkan
- (Turkey) Sercan Yıldırım
