= Oytun Özdoğan =

Türkish footballer

Personal information
- Full name: Ahmet Oytun Özdoğan
- Date of birth: 16 June 1998 (age 28)
- Place of birth: Denizli, Turkey
- Height: 1.98 m (6 ft 6 in)
- Position: Goalkeeper

Team information
- Current team: Şanlıurfaspor

Youth career
- 2010–2014: Sarayköy 1926
- 2014–2018: Fenerbahçe

Senior career*
Years	Team	Apps	(Gls)
2018–2021	Fenerbahçe	1	(0)
2018–2019	→ 52 Orduspor (loan)	0	(0)
2021–2023	Yeni Malatyaspor	1	(0)
2021	→ Kırklarelispor (loan)	1	(0)
2023–2024	Malisheva	2	(0)
2024–2025	Suhareka	20	(0)
2026–	Şanlıurfaspor	0	(0)

International career
2015	Turkey U17	1	(0)
- * Club domestic league appearances and goals as of 1 October 2026

Ahmet Oytun Özdoğan (born 16 June 1998) is a Turkish footballer who plays for Şanlıurfaspor] as a goalkeeper.

== Club career ==
Özdoğan joined the youth academy of Fenerbahçe in 2014, and signed his first professional contract with them in 2018 before joining 52 Orduspor on loan. Özdoğan made his professional debut with Fenerbahçe in a 3-1 Süper Lig loss to Gaziantep F.K. on 19 December 2020.

== International career ==
Özdoğan is a youth international for Turkey, having represented the Turkey U17s in a friendly 1–0 loss to the Luxembourg U17s on 9 April 2015.
