= Serdar Aziz =

Turkish footballer (born 1990)

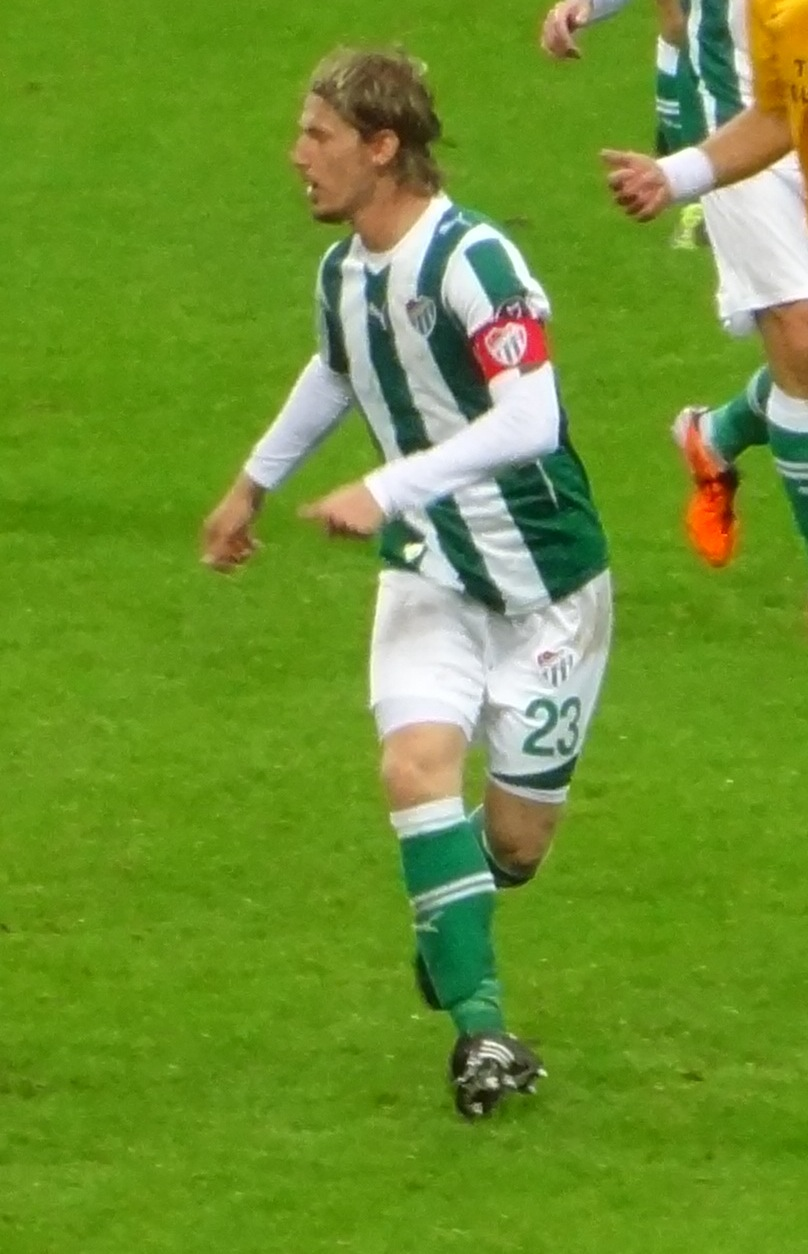
- Aziz with Bursaspor in 2011

Personal information
- Date of birth: 23 October 1990 (age 36)
- Place of birth: Bursa, Turkey
- Height: 1.83 m (6 ft 0 in)
- Positions: Centre-back; right-back

Youth career
- 2000–2010: Bursaspor
- 2007–2008: → Merinosspor (loan)

Senior career*
Years	Team	Apps	(Gls)
2008–2016	Bursaspor	137	(7)
2016–2019	Galatasaray	42	(3)
2019–2025	Fenerbahçe	110	(10)

International career
2006	Turkey U16	2	(0)
2006–2007	Turkey U17	13	(0)
2007–2008	Turkey U18	7	(0)
2007–2009	Turkey U19	18	(0)
2010	Turkey U20	2	(0)
2009–2012	Turkey U21	16	(1)
2014–2021	Turkey	18	(2)
- * Club domestic league appearances and goals as of 12 May 2024

Serdar Aziz (born 23 October 1990) is a Turkish professional footballer who plays as a centre-back or right-back.

== Early life ==
Aziz was born in Osmangazi, Bursa. His father was born in Bitola, Yugoslavia of Turkish descent and his mother was born in Bursa. He has two older siblings, one brother and one sister. Aziz's father was an amateur footballer in Bursa. At the age of 10, Aziz enrolled in a football school in Bursa. He spent 2 months at the school before he was signed to a youth contract by Bursaspor. Aziz originally played in midfield due to his small stature. However, Aziz pleaded his coach to place him as a center back because he believed he wasn't good enough technically to play in midfield. Aziz had a growth spurt soon after, which cemented his position at stopper.

== Club career ==
=== Bursaspor ===
Raşit Çetiner called Aziz up to the senior squad in 2006. Although he did not make his debut, Aziz was allowed to train alongside the senior players. He was loaned to feeder club Bursa Merinosspor for the 2007–08 season. Aziz was not open to the move, but warmed up to the idea after he realized the club was virtually one and the same with Bursaspor. He admitted the physical nature of the TFF Third League helped aid his development into becoming a professional centre-back. Aziz made his professional debut for Bursaspor on 25 October 2008 against Fenerbahçe, with Bursaspor losing 5–2. He was a part of the Bursaspor squad that won the Süper Lig in 2009–10.

=== Galatasaray ===
On 1 July 2016, Aziz transferred to Süper Lig club Galatasaray for €4.5 million. He made his debut for the team in a 5–1 Turkish Cup win over Dersimspor on 25 October 2016. He made his Süper Lig debut for the team in a 2–0 loss against Fenerbahçe in The Intercontinental Derby on 20 November 2016.

On 23 February 2018, he scored against his former club Bursaspor in a 3–0 win, after scoring he chose not to celebrate.

=== Fenerbahçe ===
On 31 January 2019, Aziz transferred to another Süper Lig, club Fenerbahçe, for three and half years on free transfer. He made his debut in a 1–0 win over Göztepe on 8 February 2019.

On 20 May 2022, he signed another three-year deal with the team.

On 21 September 2023, he scored his first continental goal against Nordsjælland in UEFA Europa Conference League, Fenerbahçe won 3–1. On 8 July 2024, Aziz came to a mutual agreement with Fenerbahçe coach Jose Mourinho and the club to be transferred to another club and left the camp.

== International career ==
Aziz has played for Turkey at the U–16, U–17, U–18, U–19, and U–21 levels. Aziz was a part of the U–19 squad that competed at the 2009 UEFA European Under-19 Football Championship.

Due to having some Kosovo origins, Aziz is eligible to play for the Kosovo soccer team, although he considers himself Turkish and expressed the view of playing for Turkey.

He has received call-ups from the Macedonia national team, however he rejected it, stating his desire to represent Turkey at the senior level.

He made his debut at senior level on 16 November against Kazakhstan and in that game he scored the third goal in a 3–1 win.

== Career statistics ==
=== Club ===
As of match played 12 May 2024.

Appearances and goals by club, season and competition
Club	Season	League			Cup		Continental		Other		Total	
Club	Season	Division	Apps	Goals	Apps	Goals	Apps	Goals	Apps	Goals	Apps	Goals
Bursaspor	2008–09	Süper Lig	6	1	1	0	–		–		7	1
Bursaspor	2009–10	Süper Lig	0	0	0	0	–		–		0	0
Bursaspor	2010–11	Süper Lig	15	0	4	1	2 (Note: Appearances in UEFA Champions League)	0	1 (Note: Appearances in Turkish Super Cup)	0	22	1
Bursaspor	2011–12	Süper Lig	26	0	3	2	3 (Note: Appearances in UEFA Europa League)	1	3 (Note: Three appearances in Super Final Europa League Play-offs)	1	35	4
Bursaspor	2012–13	Süper Lig	19	0	3	0	3	0	–		25	0
Bursaspor	2013–14	Süper Lig	20	1	5	0	0	0	–		25	1
Bursaspor	2014–15	Süper Lig	27	1	7	1	–		–		34	2
Bursaspor	2015–16	Süper Lig	21	2	1	0	–		1	0	23	2
Bursaspor	Total		134	5	29	4	8	1	5	1	176	11
Galatasaray	2016–17	Süper Lig	5	0	1	0	–		0	0	6	0
Galatasaray	2017–18	Süper Lig	27	1	3	2	0	0	–		30	3
Galatasaray	2018–19	Süper Lig	10	2	0	0	4	0	1	0	15	2
Galatasaray	Total		42	3	4	2	4	0	1	0	51	5
Fenerbahçe	2018–19	Süper Lig	10	1	–		–		–		10	1
Fenerbahçe	2019–20	Süper Lig	22	4	1	0	–		–		23	4
Fenerbahçe	2020–21	Süper Lig	27	3	4	0	–		–		31	3
Fenerbahçe	2021–22	Süper Lig	25	2	0	0	4 (Note: Three appearances in UEFA Europa League, one appearances in UEFA Europa Conference League)	0	–		29	2
Fenerbahçe	2022–23	Süper Lig	14	0	1	0	7 (Note: One appearances in UEFA Champions League, six appearances UEFA Europa League)	0	–		22	0
Fenerbahçe	2023–24	Süper Lig	12	0	2	0	6 (Note: Appearances in UEFA Conference League)	1	0	0	17	1
Fenerbahçe	2024–25	Süper Lig	0	0	0	0	0	0	–		0	0
Fenerbahçe	Total		110	10	8	0	17	1	0	0	135	11
Career total			286	19	41	6	29	1	6	0	362	27

=== International ===
Appearances and goals by national team and year
National team	Year	Apps	Goals
Turkey
Turkey	2014	1	1
Turkey	2015	8	0
Turkey	2016	2	0
Turkey	2017	3	0
Turkey	2018	3	1
Turkey	2019	0	0
Turkey	2020	0	0
Turkey	2021	1	0
Total		18	2

Scores and results list Turkey's goal tally first.

Goal	Date	Venue	Opponent	Score	Result	Competition
1.	16 November 2014	Türk Telekom Arena, Istanbul, Turkey	Kazakhstan	3–0	3–1	UEFA Euro 2016 qualification
2.	7 September 2018	Şenol Güneş Stadium, Trabzon, Turkey	Russia	1–1	1–2	2018–19 UEFA Nations League B

== Honours ==
Bursaspor

- Süper Lig: 2009–10

Galatasaray

- Süper Lig: 2017–18
- Süper Kupa: 2016

Fenerbahçe

- Turkish Cup: 2022–23

Individual

- Süper Lig Team of the Season: 2014–15

== See also ==
- Serdar Aziz: "Bursaspor'da sembol olmak istiyorum" – An extensive interview with Serdar Aziz (in Turkish)
