= Harun Tekin (footballer) =

Turkish professional footballer

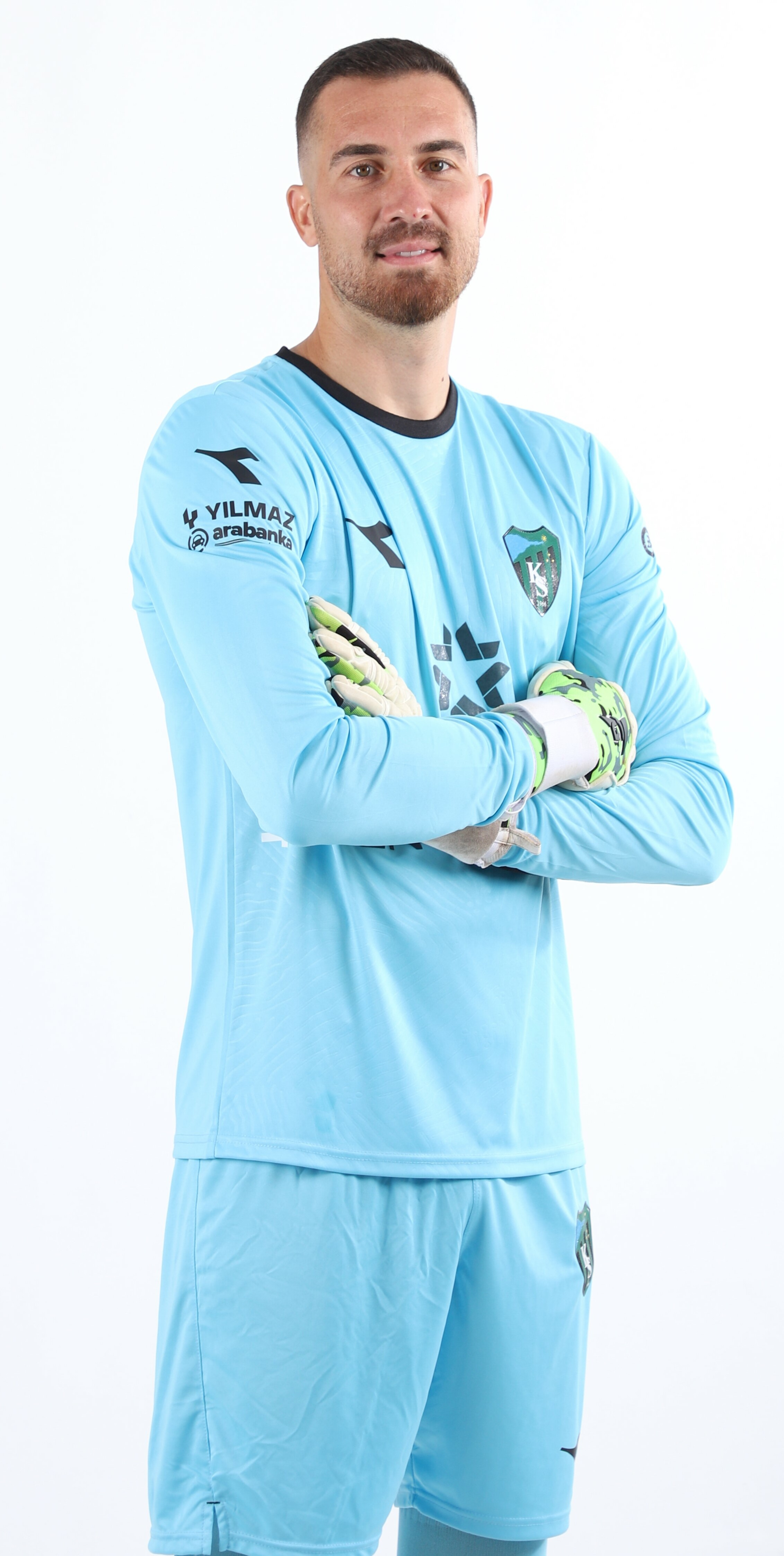
- Tekin with Kocaelispor in 2023

Personal information
- Date of birth: 17 June 1989 (age 37)
- Place of birth: Menemen, Turkey
- Height: 1.83 m (6 ft 0 in)
- Position: Goalkeeper

Team information
- Current team: Beykoz Anadolu
- Number: 1

Youth career
- 2002–2007: Menemen Belediyespor

Senior career*
Years	Team	Apps	(Gls)
2007–2010	İstanbul Güngörenspor	48	(0)
2010–2018	Bursaspor	129	(0)
2018–2021	Fenerbahçe	28	(0)
2021–2022	Kasımpaşa	9	(0)
2022–2023	Eyüpspor	35	(0)
2023–2025	Kocaelispor	14	(0)
2025–	Beykoz Anadolu	8	(0)

International career^{‡}
2017	Turkey	2	(0)
- * Club domestic league appearances and goals as of 15 March 2026 ‡ National team caps and goals as of 9 November 2017

Harun Tekin (born 17 June 1989) is a Turkish professional footballer who plays as a goalkeeper for TFF 2. Lig club Beykoz Anadolu.

== International career ==
On 20 March 2015, Tekin was selected for the Turkey national football team to play against Netherlands and Luxembourg. He is part of the Turkey national team for Euro 2016. Tekin made his international debut for the Turkey national football team in a friendly 3-1 win over Moldova on 27 March 2017.

== Career statistics ==
As of match played 15 March 2026

Appearances and goals by club, season and competition
Club	Season	League			National cup		Europe		Other		Total	
Club	Season	Division	Apps	Goals	Apps	Goals	Apps	Goals	Apps	Goals	Apps	Goals
İstanbul Güngörenspor	2007–08	TFF 2. Lig	11	0	0	0	—		—		11	0
İstanbul Güngörenspor	2008–09	TFF 1. Lig	21	0	1	0	—		—		22	0
İstanbul Güngörenspor	2009–10	TFF 2. Lig	16	0	1	0	—		—		17	0
İstanbul Güngörenspor	Total		48	0	2	0	—		—		50	0
Bursaspor	2010–11	Süper Lig	0	0	1	0	0	0	0	0	1	0
Bursaspor	2011–12	Süper Lig	0	0	0	0	0	0	—		0	0
Bursaspor	2012–13	Süper Lig	6	0	5	0	0	0	—		11	0
Bursaspor	2013–14	Süper Lig	7	0	0	0	0	0	—		7	0
Bursaspor	2014–15	Süper Lig	34	0	9	0	2	0	—		45	0
Bursaspor	2015–16	Süper Lig	14	0	5	0	—		0	0	19	0
Bursaspor	2016–17	Süper Lig	34	0	0	0	—		—		34	0
Bursaspor	2017–18	Süper Lig	31	0	1	0	—		—		32	0
Bursaspor	2018–19	Süper Lig	3	0	—		—		—		3	0
Bursaspor	Total		129	0	21	0	2	0	0	0	152	0
Fenerbahçe	2018–19	Süper Lig	22	0	1	0	8	0	—		31	0
Fenerbahçe	2019–20	Süper Lig	2	0	6	0	—		—		8	0
Fenerbahçe	2020–21	Süper Lig	6	0	2	0	—		—		8	0
Fenerbahçe	Total		30	0	9	0	8	0	—		47	0
Kasımpaşa	2021–22	Süper Lig	9	0	1	0	—		—		10	0
Eyüpspor	2022–23	TFF 1. Lig	35	0	1	0	—		3	0	39	0
Kocaelispor	2023–24	TFF 1. Lig	12	0	1	0	—		0	0	13	0
Kocaelispor	2024–25	TFF 1. Lig	2	0	2	0	—		—		4	0
Kocaelispor	Total		14	0	3	0	—		0	0	17	0
Beykoz Anadolu	2025–26	TFF 2. Lig	8	0	0	0	—		—		8	0
Career total			273	0	37	0	10	0	3	0	323	0
