= Cemali Sertel =

Turkish footballer (born 2000)

Personal information
- Date of birth: 6 January 2000 (age 26)
- Place of birth: Samandağ, Turkey
- Height: 1.86 m (6 ft 1 in)
- Position: Left back

Team information
- Current team: Çorum
- Number: 19

Youth career
- 2013–2015: Hatayspor
- 2015–2018: Eskişehirspor

Senior career*
| Years | Team | Apps | (Gls) |
| 2018–2019 | Eskişehirspor | 19 | (1) |
| 2019–2025 | İstanbul Başakşehir | 22 | (0) |
| 2019–2020 | → Eskişehirspor (loan) | 32 | (2) |
| 2021–2022 | → Çaykur Rizespor (loan) | 30 | (1) |
| 2022–2023 | → Antalyaspor (loan) | 18 | (0) |
| 2024–2025 | → Hatayspor (loan) | 44 | (2) |
| 2025– | Çorum | 16 | (0) |

International career^{‡}
| 2019 | Turkey U19 | 3 | (0) |
| 2019 | Turkey U21 | 2 | (0) |
- * Club domestic league appearances and goals as of 5 May 2026 ‡ National team caps and goals as of 04:42, 6 December 2021 (UTC)

Cemali Sertel (born 6 January 2000) is a Turkish professional footballer who plays as a left-back for TFF 1. Lig club Çorum.

== Professional career ==
Sertel began his professional career with Eskişehirspor. On 29 January 2019, Sertel signed a professional contract with İstanbul Başakşehir, before returning to Eskişehirspor on a season-long loan. Sertel made his senior debut with Başakşehir in a 2–0 Süper Lig loss to Hatayspor on 14 September 2020.

On 25 July 2022, Sertel was sent on a one-season loan to Antalyaspor.
