= 2019–20 Antalyaspor season =

Antalyaspor
2019–20 season
- Chairman: Ali Şafak Öztürk
- Manager: Bülent Korkmaz (until 12 November 2019); Stjepan Tomas (until 31 December 2019); Tamer Tuna (from 4 January 2020)
- Stadium: Antalya Stadium
- Süper Lig: 9th
- Turkish Cup: Semi-finals
- Top goalscorer: League: Adis Jahović (6); All: Adis Jahović (6)
Home colours	Away colours	Third colours

The 2019–20 season was Antalyaspor's 54th year in existence. In addition to the domestic league, Antalyaspor participated in the Turkish Cup.

== Kits ==
- Supplier: Nike
- Main sponsor: Regnum Carya
- Back sponsor: Anex Tour
- Sleeve sponsor: Corendon Airlines
- Socks sponsor: 7 Mehmet

Home	Away	Third	Fourth

== Players ==
=== First-team squad ===
As of 31 January 2020.

Note: Flags indicate national team as defined under FIFA eligibility rules; some limited exceptions apply. Players may hold more than one non-FIFA nationality.

No.	Pos.	Nation	Player
1	GK	TUR	Yakup Mert Çakır
2	DF	TUR	Ersan Gülüm
4	DF	TUR	Salih Dursun
5	DF	TUR	Bahadır Öztürk
6	DF	TUR	Eren Albayrak
7	MF	TUR	Doğukan Sinik
8	MF	BRA	Charles
9	FW	ARG	Gustavo Blanco Leschuk
11	FW	GER	Lukas Podolski
12	FW	NGA	Paul Mukairu
13	DF	RUS	Fyodor Kudryashov
16	MF	ANG	Fredy
17	DF	TUR	Tarık Çamdal
18	MF	TUR	Yekta Kurtuluş
19	MF	GER	Ufuk Akyol
20	MF	BRA	Chico

No.	Pos.	Nation	Player
22	MF	TUR	Harun Alpsoy
23	FW	BRA	Amilton
25	GK	BEL	Ruud Boffin
28	DF	CZE	Ondřej Čelůstka
30	DF	TUR	Nazım Sangaré
35	GK	TUR	Ferhat Kaplan
41	DF	FRA	Aly Cissokho
59	MF	CGO	Delvin N'Dinga
77	FW	GER	Sinan Gümüş (on loan from Genoa)
81	FW	MKD	Adis Jahović
88	MF	TUR	Hakan Özmert (vice-captain)
89	DF	TUR	Veysel Sarı
90	MF	TUR	Halil İbrahim Sevinç
92	MF	MAR	Aatif Chahechouhe
99	MF	TUR	Bünyamin Balcı

== Transfers ==
=== In ===
No.	Pos	Player	Transferred from	Fee	Date	Source
			TBD		1 July 2019	

=== Out ===
No.	Pos	Player	Transferred to	Fee	Date	Source
			TBD		1 July 2019	

== Pre-season and friendlies ==
Win Draw Loss

=== Pre-season ===
16 July 2019 Friendly	Antalyaspor (Turkey)	1–1	(Turkey) Gençlerbirliği	Erzurum
17:00	Özkan 45'		Çiftçi 42'	Stadium: Yüksek İrtifa Kamp Merkezi K1 Nolu Saha

23 July 2019 Friendly	Alanyaspor (Turkey)	0–0	(Turkey) Antalyaspor	Düzce
16:30				Stadium: Fenerbahçe S.K. Topuk Yaylası Tesisleri

26 July 2019 Friendly	Antalyaspor (Turkey)	0–0	(Turkey) Fatih Karagümrük	Düzce
16:00				Stadium: Fenerbahçe S.K. Topuk Yaylası Tesisleri

28 July 2019 Friendly	Antalyaspor (Turkey)	1–1	(Turkey) Ankaraspor	Düzce
16:00	Özkan 44'		Çağıran 73'	Stadium: Fenerbahçe S.K. Topuk Yaylası Tesisleri

30 July 2019 Friendly	Çaykur Rizespor (Turkey)	2–2	(Turkey) Antalyaspor	Düzce
16:00	Mukairu 2'; Chico 38'		El Kabir 10'; Samudio 23'	Stadium: Fenerbahçe S.K. Topuk Yaylası Tesisleri

=== Mid-season ===
7 September 2019 Friendly	Antalyaspor (Turkey)	0–0	(Turkey) Alanyaspor	Antalya
18:30				Stadium: Regnum Carya Golf & Spa Resort - Field 1

12 October 2019 Friendly	Antalyaspor (Turkey)	2–1	(Ukraine) Desna Chernihiv	Antalya
17:00	Öztürk 13'; Özkan 65' (pen.)		Khlyobas 25'	Stadium: Regnum Carya Golf & Spa Resort - Field 1

9 January 2020 Friendly	Antalyaspor (Turkey)	4–0	(Turkey) BB Erzurumspor	Antalya
16:00	Amilton 16', 20'; Blanco Leschuk 43'; Mukairu 73'			Stadium: Regnum Carya Golf & Spa Resort - Field 1

11 January 2020 Friendly	Antalyaspor (Turkey)	2–1	(Netherlands) Fortuna Sittard	Antalya
17:00	Diego Ângelo 33'; Blanco Leschuk 34'		Donkor 72'	Stadium: Regnum Carya Golf & Spa Resort - Field 1

25 February 2020 Friendly	Antalyaspor (Turkey)	Cancelled	(Germany) Türkgücü München
17:00

== Competitions ==
=== Overview ===
Competition	First match	Last match	Starting round	Final position	Record							
Competition	First match	Last match	Starting round	Final position	Pld	W	D	L	GF	GA	GD	Win %
Süper Lig	18 August 2019	24 July 2020	Matchday 1	9th	34	11	12	11	41	52	−11	32.35
Turkish Cup	29 October 2019	18 June 2020	Fourth Round	Semi-finals	9	2	5	2	12	13	−1	22.22
Total					43	13	17	13	53	65	−12	30.23

Source: Competitions

=== Süper Lig ===
==== League table ====
Pos	Team	Pld	W	D	L	GF	GA	GD	Pts
7	Fenerbahçe	34	15	8	11	58	46	+12	53
8	Gaziantep	34	11	13	10	49	50	−1	46
9	Antalyaspor	34	11	12	11	41	52	−11	45
10	Kasımpaşa	34	12	7	15	53	58	−5	43
11	Göztepe	34	11	9	14	44	49	−5	42

Source: Süper Lig, Soccerway
Rules for classification: 1) Points; 2) Head-to-head points; 3) Head-to-head goal difference; 4) Head-to-head goals scored; 5) Goal difference; 6) Goals scored; 7) Play-off.

==== Results summary ====
Overall								Home						Away					
Pld	W	D	L	GF	GA	GD	Pts	W	D	L	GF	GA	GD	W	D	L	GF	GA	GD
34	11	12	11	41	52	−11	45	5	6	6	22	29	−7	6	6	5	19	23	−4

Updated: 24 July 2020

Source: TFF

==== Results by round ====
Round	1	2	3	4	5	6	7	8	9	10	11	12	13	14	15	16	17	18	19	20	21	22	23	24	25	26	27	28	29	30	31	32	33	34
Ground	A	H	A	H	A	H	A	H	A	H	A	H	A	H	A	H	A	H	A	H	A	H	A	H	A	H	A	H	A	H	A	H	A	H
Result	W	L	D	D	L	W	W	L	L	L	L	D	L	L	D	D	L	L	W	D	D	W	W	D	D	W	W	W	D	L	D	W	W	D
Position	6	9	10	11	14	10	7	10	14	14	15	16	16	16	16	16	16	16	15	15	15	14	11	12	12	11	10	9	9	10	10	9	8	9

Updated to match(es) played on 24 July 2020. Source: TFF.org
A = Away; H = Home; W = Win; D = Draw; L = Loss

==== Matches ====
18 August 2019 1	Göztepe	0–1	Antalyaspor	İzmir
21:45	Titi (yellow card) 22'; Poko (yellow card) 55'; Gassama (yellow card) 80'	Report	Diego Ângelo 29'; Özmert (yellow card) 34'; Čelůstka (yellow card) 64'; Kaplan (yellow card) 81'	Stadium: Bornova Stadium; Referee: Zorbay Küçük

25 August 2019 2	Antalyaspor	0–2	Denizlispor	Antalya
21:45	Chahechouhe (penalty missed) 79'; Akyol (yellow card) 81'	Report	Öztürk 37' (o.g.); Yavru (yellow card) 44'; Barrow (yellow card) 52'; Barrow 67'; Aissati (yellow card) 81'	Stadium: Antalya Stadium; Referee: Volkan Bayarslan

31 August 2019 3	Konyaspor	2–2	Antalyaspor	Konya
19:15	Bajić 60'; Miya 75'; Jevtović (yellow card) 84'; Şahiner (yellow card) 90'	Report	Özkan 16' (pen.); Blanco Leschuk (yellow card) 58'; Mukairu 84'; Boffin (yellow card) 90'	Stadium: Konya Büyükşehir Stadium; Referee: Ümit Öztürk

14 September 2019 4	Antalyaspor	2–2	Kayserispor	Antalya
20:00	Blanco Leschuk 2'; Akyol (yellow card) 36'; Sangaré (yellow card) 40'; Özkan 50' (yellow card) 60'	Report	Adebayor 44' (pen.); Djédjé (yellow card) 50'; Poulain 74'	Stadium: Antalya Stadium; Referee: Fırat Aydınus

21 September 2019 5	Kasımpaşa	3–0	Antalyaspor	Istanbul
15:00	Pektemek 53'; Thiam 60', 80' (yellow card) 71'; Kara (yellow card) 90'	Report	Öztürk (yellow card) 55'; Sangaré (yellow card) 64'; Charles (yellow card) 87'	Stadium: Recep Tayyip Erdoğan Stadium; Attendance: 2.170; Referee: Koray Gençerler

29 September 2019 6	Antalyaspor	3–0	Yeni Malatyaspor	Antalya
16:30	Chahechouhe 38'; Akyol (yellow card) 53' (goal) 61'; Özmert 90'; Charles (yellow card) 90+3'	Report	Aytaç (yellow card) 40'; Akbaş (red card) 88'; Kaş (yellow card) 90+1'	Stadium: Antalya Stadium; Attendance: 8.485; Referee: Bahattin Şimşek

4 October 2019 7	Fenerbahçe	0–1	Antalyaspor	Istanbul
20:30	Jørgensen (yellow card) 51'; Belözoğlu (yellow card) 66'	Report	Akyol 6'; Boffin (yellow card) 81'; Özmert (yellow card) 89'	Stadium: Şükrü Saracoğlu Stadium; Attendance: 37.077; Referee: Yaşar Kemal Uğurlu

19 October 2019 8	Antalyaspor	0–6	Gençlerbirliği	Antalya
15:00	Öztürk (red card) 23'; Özmert (yellow card) 35'; Kaplan (yellow card) 57'	Report	Candeias 1', 21', 37' (yellow card) 60'; Sio 12', 42'; Stancu 57'; Ramos (yellow card) 90+1'	Stadium: Antalya Stadium; Attendance: 7.255; Referee: Abdulkadir Bitigen

26 October 2019 9	Sivasspor	2–1	Antalyaspor	Sivas
15:00	Kılınç 51'; Yatabaré (yellow card) 55' (goal) 76'; Arslan (yellow card) 73'; Yandaş (yellow card) 90+4'	Report	Özmert (yellow card) 63'; Özkan 83' (pen.)	Stadium: New Sivas 4 Eylül Stadium; Attendance: 7.600; Referee: Alper Ulusoy

2 November 2019 10	Antalyaspor	1–2	Beşiktaş	Antalya
20:00	Öztürk (yellow card) 8'; Mukairu 51' (yellow card) 90'; Blanco Leschuk (yellow card) 67'	Report	Vida 9'; Diaby 11'; Nayir (yellow card) 48'; Rebocho (yellow card) 69'	Stadium: Antalya Stadium; Attendance: 19.670; Referee: Cüneyt Çakır

9 November 2019 11	Çaykur Rizespor	1–0	Antalyaspor	Rize
17:30	Aberhoun 26'; Morozyuk (yellow card) 44'; Çetin (red card) 53'; Vetrih (yellow card) 71'	Report	Amilton (yellow card) 49'; Blanco Leschuk (yellow card) 59'; Özkan (yellow card) 61'; Albayrak (yellow card) 70'	Stadium: Yeni Rize Şehir Stadium; Attendance: 5.992; Referee: Yaşar Kemal Uğurlu

25 November 2019 12	Antalyaspor	1–1	Gaziantep	Antalya
20:00	Charles (yellow card) 45+1'; Sangaré 84'; Mukairu (yellow card) 90+5'	Report	Soyalp (yellow card) 13'; Jefferson (yellow card) 20'; Ceylan (yellow card) 33'; Djilobodji 37'	Stadium: Antalya Stadium; Attendance: 7.517; Referee: Hüseyin Göçek

1 December 2019 13	İstanbul Başakşehir	2–0	Antalyaspor	Istanbul
16:30	Crivelli (yellow card) 17'; Clichy 60'; Aleksić 63'	Report	Charles (yellow card) 15'; Diego Ângelo (yellow card) 59'; Čelůstka (yellow card) 79'	Stadium: Başakşehir Fatih Terim Stadium; Attendance: 1.424; Referee: Serkan Tokat

8 December 2019 14	Antalyaspor	1–3	Trabzonspor	Antalya
16:30	Čelůstka 17'; Özmert (yellow card) 29'; Özkan (yellow card) 87'	Report	Sørloth 3'; Nwakaeme 25'; Sari 44'; Sturridge (yellow card) 58'; Asan (yellow card) 87'	Stadium: Antalya Stadium; Attendance: 15.047; Referee: Yaşar Kemal Uğurlu

13 December 2019 15	Alanyaspor	0–0	Antalyaspor	Alanya, Antalya
20:30	Baiano (yellow card) 58'; Gülselam (yellow card) 78'; Siopis (yellow card) 90'	Report	Kaplan (yellow card) 2'; Özmert (yellow card) 15'; Akyol (yellow card) 36'	Stadium: Bahçeşehir Okulları Stadium; Attendance: 4.519; Referee: Zorbay Küçük

20 December 2019 16	Antalyaspor	2–2	MKE Ankaragücü	Antalya
20.30	Amilton (yellow card) 16'; Chico 23'; Sinik (yellow card) 65'; Blanco Leschuk 80'	Report	Canteros (yellow card) 45' (goal) 56'; Kulušić (yellow card) 51'; Kitsiou 90+4'; Önal (yellow card) 90+4'	Stadium: Antalya Stadium; Attendance: 9.103; Referee: Fırat Aydınus

28 December 2019 17	Galatasaray	5–0	Antalyaspor	Istanbul
20:00	Falcao 10' (pen.) 28'; Lemina (yellow card) 14'; Čelůstka 36' (o.g.); Muslera (yellow card) 61'; Babel 82'; Antalyalı 89'	Report	Sinik (yellow card) 26'; Özmert (yellow card) 43'; Çamdal (yellow card) 55'; Sangaré (yellow card) 77'	Stadium: Türk Telekom Stadium; Attendance: 24.965; Referee: Abdulkadir Bitigen

19 January 2020 18	Antalyaspor	0–3	Göztepe	Antalya
13:30	Sinik (yellow card) 24'; Diego Ângelo (yellow card) 40' (yellow-red card) 86'; Özmert (yellow card) 44'	Report	Akbunar 16'; Gürler 36'; Aydoğdu 44' (yellow card) 60'; Kayan (yellow card) 89'	Stadium: Antalya Stadium; Attendance: 8.288; Referee: Atilla Karaoğlan

26 January 2020 19	Denizlispor	0–3	Antalyaspor	Denizli
13:30	Onazi (yellow card) 12'; Yılmaz (yellow card) 87'	Report	Balcı (yellow card) 3'; Mukairu (yellow card) 18' (goal) 40'; Jahović 26'; Blanco Leschuk 57'	Stadium: Denizli Atatürk Stadium; Attendance: 8.501; Referee: Halil Umut Meler

1 February 2020 20	Antalyaspor	0–0	Konyaspor	Antalya
14:00	Balcı (yellow card) 69'; Sarı (yellow card) 73'; Charles (yellow card) 90+3'	Report		Stadium: Antalya Stadium; Attendance: 11.393; Referee: Halis Özkahya

9 February 2020 21	Kayserispor	2–2	Antalyaspor	Kayseri
13:30	Taşdemir (yellow card) 13'; Mensah 41' (pen.); Pedro Henrique 46' (yellow card) 75'; Săpunaru (yellow card) 58'; Campanharo (yellow card) 90+1'	Report	Özmert (yellow card) 3'; Gümüş 45' (pen.) (yellow card) 58'; Sarı (yellow card) 58'; Fredy 83'; Podolski (yellow card) 90+1'	Stadium: Kadir Has Stadium; Attendance: 5.892; Referee: Koray Gençerler

17 February 2020 22	Antalyaspor	3–1	Kasımpaşa	Antalya
20:00	Jahović (yellow card) 43' (goal) 53'; Gümüş 59', 62' (yellow card) 62'; Čelůstka (yellow card) 73'; Sinik (yellow card) 89'	Report	Thiam (yellow card) 11'; Tirpan (yellow card) 30'; Ndongala (yellow card) 51'; Kara 74'	Stadium: Antalya Stadium; Attendance: 10.860; Referee: Arda Kardeşler

23 February 2020 23	Yeni Malatyaspor	1–2	Antalyaspor	Malatya
13:30	Bulut 29'; Mina (yellow card) 39'; Yalçın (yellow card) 90+5'	Report	Fredy 8'; Gümüş (yellow card) 26' (yellow card) 31' (red card); Podolski 89'	Stadium: New Malatya Stadium; Attendance: 7.571; Referee: Yaşar Kemal Uğurlu

29 February 2020 24	Antalyaspor	2–2	Fenerbahçe	Antalya
20:00	Amilton 52'; Özmert 57' (yellow card) 90+2' (yellow card) 90+8' (red card); Podolski (yellow card) 63'; Jahović (yellow card) 90'; Fredy (yellow card) 90+4'; Čelůstka (yellow card) 90+8'	Report	Muriqi 35'; Luiz Gustavo (yellow card) 50'; Zajc 90+6'	Stadium: Antalya Stadium; Attendance: 21.616; Referee: Ali Şansalan

9 March 2020 25	Gençlerbirliği	1–1	Antalyaspor	Ankara
20:00	Seuntjens (yellow card) 27'; Sio 53'; Touré (yellow card) 56'; Sessègnon (yellow card) 64'	Report	Chico (yellow card) 35'; Podolski 82'	Stadium: Eryaman Stadium; Attendance: 4.849; Referee: Halil Umut Meler

16 March 2020 26	Antalyaspor	1–0	Sivasspor	Antalya
20:00	Podolski (yellow card) 62'; Sarı 81'	Report	Osmanpaşa (yellow card) 60'; Kılınç (yellow card) 65'; Goiano (yellow card) 70' (yellow-red card) 85'	Stadium: Antalya Stadium; Attendance: 0 Referee: Özgür Yankaya

13 June 2020 27	Beşiktaş	1–2	Antalyaspor	Istanbul
21:00	Elneny (yellow card) 32'; Ruiz (yellow card) 64'; Ljajić 68'; Vida (yellow card) 90+1'	Report	Sangaré (yellow card) 12'; Gümüş 15'; Amilton 35'; Sarı (yellow card) 52'; Kudryashov (yellow card) 53'	Stadium: Vodafone Park; Attendance: 0 Referee: Ümit Öztürk

22 June 2020 28	Antalyaspor	3–1	Çaykur Rizespor	Antalya
21:00	Gümüş 3' (yellow card) 51'; Jahović 74' (pen.); Gülüm 76' (yellow card) 90+8'	Report	Morozyuk (yellow card) 47'; Çetin (yellow card) 75'; Škoda 90+8' (pen.)	Stadium: Antalya Stadium; Attendance: 0 Referee: Suat Arslanboğa

28 June 2020 29	Gaziantep	1–1	Antalyaspor	Gaziantep
21:00	Kayode 58'; Ceylan (yellow card) 73'; André Sousa (yellow card) 77'	Report	Özmert (yellow card) 53' (yellow-red card) 66'; Boffin (yellow card) 88'; Jahović 88' (pen.)	Stadium: New Gaziantep Stadium; Attendance: 0 Referee: Serkan Tokat

4 July 2020 30	Antalyaspor	0–2	İstanbul Başakşehir	Antalya
21:00	Jahović (yellow card) 90+3'	Report	Epureanu (yellow card) 38'; Škrtel (yellow card) 51'; Ba 71'; Elia 90+7'	Stadium: Antalya Stadium; Attendance: 0 Referee: Yaşar Kemal Uğurlu

8 July 2020 31	Trabzonspor	2–2	Antalyaspor	Trabzon
18:30	Sosa 15', 43' (pen.); Campi (yellow card) 83'	Report	Akyol 8' (pen.) (yellow card) 76'; Sarı (yellow card) 14'; Amilton (yellow card) 24'; Mukairu (yellow card) 42'; Kurtuluş 66'; Albayrak (yellow card) 85'	Stadium: Şenol Güneş Stadium; Attendance: 0 Referee: Halil Umut Meler

12 July 2020 32	Antalyaspor	1–0	Alanyaspor	Antalya
21:00	Jahović 22'; Albayrak (yellow card) 57'	Report	Gülselam (yellow card) 38'; Cissé (yellow card) 47'	Stadium: Antalya Stadium; Attendance: 0 Referee: Halis Özkahya

19 July 2020 33	MKE Ankaragücü	0–1	Antalyaspor	Ankara
21:00	Pinto (yellow card) 41'; Pazdan (yellow card) 48'; Kulušić (yellow card) 80'; Faty (yellow card) 85'	Report	Kurtuluş (yellow card) 64' (yellow-red card) 90+9'; Jahović 90+3' (yellow card) 90+8'	Stadium: Eryaman Stadium; Attendance: 0 Referee: Cüneyt Çakır

24 July 2020 34	Antalyaspor	2–2	Galatasaray	Antalya
21:00	Fredy 19'; Blanco Leschuk 90+2'	Report	Linnes (yellow card) 42'; Saracchi 58'; Belhanda 65' (pen.)	Stadium: Antalya Stadium; Attendance: 0 Referee: Suat Arslanboğa

=== Turkish Cup ===
==== Fourth round ====
29 October 2019 Fourth round	Niğde Anadolu	0–0 (a.e.t.) (2–3 p)	Antalyaspor	Niğde
13:45		Report		Stadium: Niğde 5 Şubat Stadium; Referee: Emre Kargın

==== Fifth round ====
4 December 2019 First leg	Eyüpspor	0–3	Antalyaspor	Istanbul
13:45		Report		Stadium: Esenler Stadium; Referee: Ramazan Keleş

17 December 2019 Second leg	Antalyaspor	2–2 (5–2 agg.)	Eyüpspor	Antalya
14:30		Report		Stadium: Antalya Stadium; Referee: Kadir Sağlam

==== Round of 16 ====
16 January 2020 First leg	Antalyaspor	4–3	Göztepe	Antalya
18:00		Report		Stadium: Antalya Stadium; Referee: Volkan Bayarslan

16 January 2020 Second leg	Göztepe	2–2 (5–6 agg.)	Antalyaspor	İzmir
17:00		Report		Stadium: Bornova Stadium; Referee: Zorbay Küçük

==== Quarter-finals ====
6 February 2020 First leg	Antalyaspor	0–0	Sivasspor	Antalya
20:30		Report		Stadium: Antalya Stadium; Referee: Yaşar Kemal Uğurlu

13 February 2020 Second leg	Sivasspor	1–1 (1–1 agg.)	Antalyaspor	Sivas
19:15		Report		Stadium: New Sivas 4 Eylül Stadium; Referee: Fırat Aydınus

==== Semi-finals ====
4 March 2020 First leg	Antalyaspor	0–1	Alanyaspor	Antalya
20:30		Report		Stadium: Antalya Stadium; Referee: Alper Ulusoy

18 June 2020 Second leg	Alanyaspor	4–0 (5–0 agg.)	Antalyaspor	Alanya, Antalya
20:45		Report		Stadium: Bahçeşehir Okulları Stadium; Referee: Arda Kardeşler

== Statistics ==
=== Goalscorers ===
Rank	No.	Pos	Nat	Player	Süper Lig	Turkish Cup	Total
1	81	FW	(North Macedonia)	Adis Jahović	6	0	6
2	77	FW	(Turkey)	Sinan Gümüş	5	0	5
3	9	FW	(Argentina)	Gustavo Blanco Leschuk	3	1	4
3	12	FW	(Nigeria)	Paul Mukairu	3	1	4
3	22	MF	(Turkey)	Harun Alpsoy	0	4	4
6	10	MF	(Turkey)	Serdar Özkan	3	0	3
6	16	FW	(Angola)	Fredy	2	1	3
6	19	MF	(Germany)	Ufuk Akyol	3	0	3
6	89	DF	(Turkey)	Veysel Sarı	3	0	3
10	3	DF	(Brazil)	Diego Ângelo	1	1	2
10	11	FW	(Germany)	Lukas Podolski	2	0	2
10	18	MF	(Turkey)	Yekta Kurtuluş	1	1	2
10	23	FW	(Brazil)	Amilton	2	0	2
10	88	MF	(Turkey)	Hakan Özmert	2	0	2
15	2	DF	(Turkey)	Ersan Gülüm	1	0	1
15	7	MF	(Turkey)	Doğukan Sinik	0	1	1
15	10	MF	(Angola)	Gelson Dala	0	1	1
15	20	MF	(Brazil)	Chico	1	0	1
15	28	DF	(Czech Republic)	Ondřej Čelůstka	1	0	1
15	30	DF	(Turkey)	Nazım Sangaré	1	0	1
15	92	MF	(Morocco)	Aatif Chahechouhe	1	0	1
15	94	FW	(Turkey)	Mikail Başar	0	1	1
Own goals					0	0	0
Totals					41	12	53
