= Sardar, Iran =

Sardar or Sar Dar (Persian: سردر or سردار) may refer to:

- Sardar, Chaharmahal and Bakhtiari (سردار - Sardār)
- Sardar, Bashagard (سردر - Sardar), Hormozgan Province
- Sardar, Hajjiabad (سردر - Sardar), Hormozgan Province
- Sar Dar, Kerman (سردر - Sar Dar)
- Sardar, Kermanshah (سردار - Sardār)
- Sar Dar, Khuzestan (سردر - Sar Dar)
