= Sirdar (disambiguation) =

Sirdar may refer to:

- Sirdar, the Commander-in-Chief of the Egyptian Army in the 19th-20th centuries.
- Sardar (Sherpa)/sirdar, leader of Sherpa guides
- a title conferred on people awarded the 1st Class of the Order of British India

== Places ==
Sirdar may also refer to places in Iran:

- Sirdar-e Bala, Lorestan Province, Iran
- Sirdar-e Pain, Lorestan Province, Iran
- Sir Dar, Markazi Province, Iran

== Ships ==
- HMS Sirdar, several Royal Navy ships

== See also ==
- Sardar (disambiguation)
- Serdar (disambiguation)
