= Sardar (disambiguation) =

Sardar may refer to:

- Sardar a title (of Persian origin) used for military or political leaders
- Sardar (IRGC), a form of address for high-ranking officers in Iran's Islamic Revolutionary Guard Corps
- Sardar (horse) (1952–??), horse belonging to Jacqueline Kennedy Onassis
- Sardar (Sherpa)/sirdar, a leader of Sherpa guides
- FC Sardor, football club from Tajikistan

== Places ==
- Sardar, Iran (disambiguation)
- Sardar Patel Stadium, several cricket stadiums in India
- Sardar Sarovar Dam, a large hydroelectric dam on the Narmada River in India
- Füzuli or Sardar, a city in Azerbaijan

== Films ==
- Sardar (1955 film), a film by Gyan Mukherjee
- Sardar (1980 film), a Pakistani action film (in Punjabi), featuring the actress Aasia
- Sardar (1993 film), a film by Ketan Mehta
- Sardar (2022 film), an Indian Tamil-language spy action-thriller film by P. S. Mithran
- Sardaar Gabbar Singh or Sardaar, a 2016 Indian film by K. S. Ravindra

== People with the given name ==
- Sardar Azmoun (born 1995), Iranian footballer
- Sardar Biglari (born 1977), American businessman
- Ali Sardar Jafri (1913–2000), Indian Urdu writer
- Sardar Amir Azam Khan (1912–1976), Pakistani politician
- Sardar Khalid Ibrahim Khan (1948–2018), Pakistani politician
- Sardar Muhammad Arif Nakai (1930–2000), Pakistani politician
- Sardar Vallabhbhai Patel (1875–1950), Deputy prime minister of India after independence
- Sardar Ajit Singh (1881–1947), Indian revolutionary
- Sardar Buta Singh (1934–2021), Indian politician
- Sardar Swaran Singh (1907–1994), Indian politician
- Sardar Ali Takkar (born 1956), Pakistani singer
- Sardar Vedaratnam (1897–1961), Indian freedom-fighter

== People with the surname ==
- Hassan Sardar (born 1957), Pakistani field hockey player
- Hossein Khan Sardar (1742–1831), Iranian governor
- Ziauddin Sardar (born 1951), London-based scholar who specializes in the future of Islam, science and cultural relations

== See also ==
- Sardhar, a village in the state of Gujarat, India
- Serdar (disambiguation)
- Sirdar (disambiguation)
- Sardari (disambiguation)
- Salar (disambiguation)
- Sardaar Ji, a 2015 Indian film by Rohit Jugraj Chauhan
  - Sardaar Ji 2, its 2016 sequel by Chauhan
  - Sardaar Ji 3, its 2025 sequel by Amar Hundal
- Son of Sardaar, a 2012 Indian film
  - Son of Sardaar 2, its 2025 sequel
