= Serdar =

Serdar may refer to

- Serdar (given name)
- Serdar (surname)
- SERDAR, a stabilized remote-controlled Ukrainian weapon station
- Serdar (city) in Turkmenistan, the capital of Serdar District
- Serdar (Ottoman rank), a military and noble rank of the Ottoman Empire, the Principality of Montenegro and the Principality of Serbia
- Serdar, Araç, a village in Turkey

== See also ==
- Sardar (disambiguation)
