= Salar (name) =

Salar (Persian: سالار) is a Persian name common in Iran, Kurdistan, Azerbaijan and Afghanistan. Notable people with this name include:

== Given name ==
- Salar Abdoh, Iranian novelist
- Salar Afrasiabi (born 1991), Iranian midfielder
- Salar Aghili (born 1977), Iranian traditional singer
- Salar Ayoubi (born 1978), Iranian oud player
- Salar Azimi (born 1982), Iranian refugee and businessman
- Salar Kamangar (born 1977), Iranian-American Google executive

== See also ==
- Salar (disambiguation)
