= Serdar (given name) =

Serdar is the Turkic spelling of the Persian masculine given name Sardar (Persian: سردر sardar or سردار sardār) which generally means "commander (of an army)" but could also bear the meaning "field marshal". Notable people with the name include:

- Adil Serdar Saçan (1962–2023), Turkish police chief
- Serdar Annaorazow(born 1990), Turkmenistani footballer
- Serdar Apaydın (born 1966), Turkish basketball player
- Serdar Avcı (born 1985), Turkish boxer
- Serdar Aziz (born 1990), Turkish footballer
- Serdar Bayrak (born 1985), Turkish footballer
- Serdar Berdimuhamedow (born 1981), Turkmen politician, president of the Republic (2022-present)
- Serdar Demirel (born 1983), Turkish sport shooter
- Serdar Dursun (born 1991), Turkish footballer
- Serdar Gökhan (born 1943), Turkish actor
- Serdar Gözübüyük (born 1985), Dutch football referee of Turkish descent
- Serdar Gümüş (born 1956), Turkish carom and artistic billiards player
- Serdar Güneş (born 1987), Turkish footballer
- Serdar Kurtuluş (born 1987), Turkish footballer
- Serdar Nasır, Turkish plastic surgeon
- Serdar Ortaç (born 1970), Turkish singer, songwriter and composer
- Serdar Özbayraktar (born 1981), Turkish footballer
- Serdar Özkan (born 1987), Turkish footballer
- Serdar Tasci (born 1987), German footballer of Turkish descent
- Serdar Topraktepe (born 1976), Turkish footballer
