= 2017–18 Galatasaray S.K. season =

Galatasaray
2017–18 season
- President: Dursun Aydın Özbek (until 20 January 2018); Mustafa Cengiz (from 20 January 2018)
- Head coach: Igor Tudor (until 18 December 2017); Fatih Terim (from 22 December 2017)
- Stadium: Türk Telekom Stadium
- Süper Lig: 1st
- Turkish Cup: Semi-finals
- UEFA Europa League: Second qualifying round
- Top goalscorer: League: Bafétimbi Gomis (29); All: Bafétimbi Gomis (32)
- Highest home attendance: 50,304 vs Beşiktaş (Süper Lig, 29 April 2018)
- Lowest home attendance: 9,633 vs Sivas Belediyespor (Turkish Cup, 28 November 2017)
- Average home league attendance: 41,076
Home colours	Away colours	Third colours

The 2017–18 season was Galatasaray's 114th in existence and 60th consecutive season in the Süper Lig. The club was aiming for an unprecedented 21st Turkish title after finishing the Süper Lig in fourth place in the previous season.

In Europe, Galatasaray participated in the UEFA Europa League, as well as competing in the Turkish Cup.

This article shows statistics of the club's players in the season, and also lists all matches that the club played in during the season. The season covered a period from 1 July 2017 to 30 June 2018.

== Club ==
=== Technical staff ===
Position	Staff
Manager	(Turkey) Fatih Terim
Assistant Manager	(Turkey) Ümit Davala
Assistant Manager	(Turkey) Hasan Şaş
Assistant Manager	(Turkey) Levent Şahin
Goalkeeper Coach	(Brazil) Cláudio Taffarel
Conditioner	(Turkey) Yasin Küçük
Chief Scout	(Turkey) Emre Utkucan

=== Medical staff ===
Position	Staff
Doctor	(Turkey) Yener İnce (Turkey) Gürbey Kahveci
Physiotherapist	(Turkey) Mustafa Korkmaz (Turkey) Burak Koca (Turkey) İlhan Er
Masseur	(Turkey) Cenk Akkaya (Turkey) Sedat Peker (Turkey) Mahmut Çalış (Turkey) Batuhan Erkan

=== Board of directors ===
Position	Staff
President	(Turkey) Mustafa Cengiz
	(Turkey) Ahmet Şenkal
	(Turkey) Adil Araboğlu
	(Turkey) Dinç Üner
	(Turkey) H. Hüseyin Toprak
	(Turkey) F. Okan Böke
	(Turkey) Acar Baltaş
	(Turkey) Nejat Güney
	(Turkey) Mahmut Recevik

=== Grounds ===
Ground (capacity and dimensions)	Ali Sami Yen Türk Telekom Stadı (52,280 / 105x68m)
Training ground	Florya Metin Oktay Sports Complex and Training Center

=== Kit ===
- Uniform manufacturer: Nike
- Chest sponsor: Nef
- Back sponsor: Garenta
- Arm sponsor: None
- Short sponsor: Fluo

Home
Away
Third

Goalkeeper 1

Goalkeeper 2

== Sponsorship ==
Companies that Galatasaray had sponsorship deals with during the season included the following.

Licensee	Product
Nef	Main Sponsor
Nike	Technical Sponsor
Garenta	Cosponsor
Fluo	Cosponsor
Coca-Cola	Cosponsor
Türk Telekom	Cosponsor
Odeabank	Cosponsor
Turkish Airlines	Cosponsor
Denizbank	Cosponsor
Liv Hospital	Cosponsor
Medical Park	Cosponsor
TemSA	Cosponsor
Tencent	Cosponsor
Sci-MX	Cosponsor
Perform Group	Cosponsor
Passo Lig	Cosponsor
Hugo Boss	Cosponsor
Diversey	Cosponsor

== Players ==
=== Squad information ===
N	Pos.	Nat.	Name	Age	EU	Since	App	Goals	Ends	Transfer fee	Notes
1	GK	(Uruguay)	Fernando Muslera (VC)	40	EU	2011	272	1	2021	€6.75M + Cana	Second nationality: Italian
2	DF	(Brazil)	Mariano	40	Non-EU	2017	23	1	2020	€4M	
3	DF	(Brazil)	Maicon	38	EU	2017	29	5	2021	€7M	Second nationality: Portuguese
4	DF	(Turkey)	Serdar Aziz	36	Non-EU	2016	30	3	2020	€4.5M + Kısa + Yıldırım + Özçal	Second nationality: Macedonian
5	DF	(Turkey)	Ahmet Çalık	32	Non-EU	2017	27	3	2021	€2.5M	
6	MF	(Turkey)	Tolga Ciğerci	34	EU	2016	46	6	2019	€3M	Second nationality: German
7	MF	(Turkey)	Yasin Öztekin	39	EU	2014	142	31	2018	€2.5M	Second nationality: German
8	MF	(Turkey)	Selçuk İnan (C)	41	Non-EU	2011	276	57	2019	Free	
9	FW	(Switzerland)	Eren Derdiyok	38	EU	2016	62	16	2019	€4M	Second nationality: Turkish
10	MF	(Morocco)	Younès Belhanda	36	EU	2017	17	2	2021	€8M	Second nationality: French
11	MF	(Germany)	Sinan Gümüş	32	EU	2014	66	23	2019	Free	Second nationality: Turkish
14	DF	(Norway)	Martin Linnes	35	Non-EU	2016	58	1	2019	€2M	
15	MF	(Netherlands)	Ryan Donk	40	EU	2016	25	1	2018	€2.5M	Second nationality: Surinamese
16	GK	(France)	Cédric Carrasso	44	EU	2017	1	0	2018	Free	
18	FW	(France)	Bafétimbi Gomis	41	EU	2017	19	14	2020	€2.5M	Second nationality: Senegalese
21	DF	(Turkey)	Tarık Çamdal	35	EU	2014	42	0	2019	€4.75M	Second nationality: German
22	DF	(Turkey)	Hakan Balta	43	EU	2007	332	13	2018	€1M + Öztorun	Second nationality: German
24	MF	(Cape Verde)	Garry Rodrigues	35	EU	2017	37	4	2021	€3.5M	Second nationality: Dutch
25	MF	(Brazil)	Fernando	39	EU	2017	16	1	2020	€5.25M	Second nationality: Portuguese
28	DF	(Germany)	Koray Günter	32	EU	2014	48	0	2018	€2.5M	Second nationality: Turkish
33	DF	(Romania)	Iasmin Latovlevici	40	EU	2017	9	0	2018	€0.55M	
46	MF	(Turkey)	Barış Zeren	27	Non-EU	2017	2	0	2020	Youth system	
55	DF	(Japan)	Yuto Nagatomo	40	Non-EU	2018	0	0	2018	€0.7M	On loan from Inter Milan
64	DF	(Belgium)	Jason Denayer	31	EU	2017	41	0	2018	€0.5M	On loan from Manchester City; Second nationality: Republic of the Congo
67	GK	(Turkey)	Eray İşcan	35	Non-EU	2011	16	0	2018	Youth system	
88	MF	(Turkey)	Gökay Güney	27	Non-EU	2016	3	0	2019	Youth system	
89	MF	(Algeria)	Sofiane Feghouli	36	EU	2017	11	3	2022	€4.25M	Second nationality: French
98	DF	(Turkey)	Sefa Özdemir	28	Non-EU	2017	0	0	2020	Youth system	

- Last updated: 1 February 2018
- Source: Galatasaray.org, Players in / out, Wikipedia players' articles (for EU passport)
- Ordered by Last season starting 11 and position on pitch (from back right to front left).

=== Transfers ===
==== In ====
No.	Pos.	Nat.	Name	Age	EU	Moving from	Type	Transfer window	Ends	Transfer fee	Source
18	FW	(France)	Bafétimbi Gomis	41	EU	Swansea City (Wales)	Transfer	Summer	2020	€2.5M	KAP.gov.tr
10	MF	(Morocco)	Younès Belhanda	36	EU	Dynamo Kyiv (Ukraine)	Transfer	Summer	2021	€8M	KAP.gov.tr
3	DF	(Brazil)	Maicon	38	Non-EU	São Paulo (Brazil)	Transfer	Summer	2021	€7M	KAP.gov.tr
2	DF	(Brazil)	Mariano	40	Non-EU	Sevilla (Spain)	Transfer	Summer	2020	€4M	KAP.gov.tr
20	MF	(Senegal)	Badou Ndiaye	36	Non-EU	Osmanlıspor	Transfer	Summer	2021	€7.5M	KAP.gov.tr
25	MF	(Brazil)	Fernando	39	Non-EU	Manchester City (England)	Transfer	Summer	2020	€5.25M	Galatasaray.org
89	MF	(Algeria)	Sofiane Feghouli	36	EU	West Ham United (England)	Transfer	Summer	2022	€4.25M	KAP.gov.tr
64	DF	(Belgium)	Jason Denayer	31	EU	Manchester City (England)	Loan	Summer	2018	€0.5M	KAP.gov.tr
33	DF	(Romania)	Iasmin Latovlevici	40	EU	Kardemir Karabükspor	Transfer	Summer	2018	€0.55M	KAP.gov.tr
16	GK	(France)	Cédric Carrasso	44	EU	Bordeaux (France)	Transfer	Summer	2018	Free	KAP.gov.tr
17	MF	(Turkey)	Emrah Başsan	34	Non-EU	Fortuna Sittard (Netherlands)	Loan return	Summer	2019	None	
38	DF	(Turkey)	Tarık Çamdal	35	EU	Eskişehirspor	Loan return	Summer	2018	None	
15	MF	(Netherlands)	Ryan Donk	40	Non-EU	Real Betis (Spain)	Loan return	Summer	2018	None	
55	DF	(Japan)	Yuto Nagatomo	40	Non-EU	Internazionale (Italy)	Loan	Winter	2018	€0.7M	Galatasaray.org

Total spending: ▼€40.25M

==== Out ====
No.	Pos.	Nat.	Name	Age	EU	Moving to	Type	Transfer window	Transfer fee	Source
23	DF	(France)	Lionel Carole	35	EU	Sevilla (Spain)	Loan	Summer	€0.35M	Galatasaray.org
11	FW	(Germany)	Lukas Podolski	41	EU	Vissel Kobe (Japan)	Transfer	Summer	€2.7M	Galatasaray.org
21	DF	(Cameroon)	Aurélien Chedjou	41	EU	İstanbul Başakşehir (Turkey)	End of contract	Summer	Free	Galatasaray.org ibfk.com.tr
55	MF	(Turkey)	Sabri Sarıoğlu	42	Non-EU	Göztepe	End of contract	Summer	Free	Galatasaray.org
20	MF	(Portugal)	Bruma	32	EU	RB Leipzig (Germany)	Transfer	Summer	€12.5M	Galatasaray.org; Dierotenbullen.com
30	MF	(Portugal)	Josué	36	EU	Porto	Loan return	Summer	Free	Fanatik.com.tr
26	DF	(Turkey)	Semih Kaya	35	EU	Sparta Prague (Czech Republic)	Transfer	Summer	€2M	Sparta.cz; Galatasaray.org
10	MF	(Netherlands)	Wesley Sneijder	42	EU	Nice (France)	Contract termination	Summer	Free	Galatasaray.org
19	GK	(Turkey)	Cenk Gönen	38	EU	Málaga (Spain)	Transfer	Summer	€0.2M	Galatasaray.org
34	MF	(Netherlands)	Nigel de Jong	41	EU	Mainz 05 (Germany)	Contract termination	Winter	Free	Galatasaray.org
17	MF	(Turkey)	Emrah Başsan	34	Non-EU	Vitória de Setúbal (Portugal)	Contract termination	Winter	Free	Galatasaray.org; Vfc.pt
20	MF	(Senegal)	Badou Ndiaye	36	Non-EU	Stoke City (England)	Transfer	Winter	€16M	Galatasaray.org; Stokecityfc.com

Total income: ▲€34.6M

Expenditure: ▼€5.65M

== Competitions ==
Win Draw Loss

=== Overall ===
Trophy	Started round	First match	Result	Last match
Süper Lig	N/A	14 August 2017	1st	19 August 2018
Turkish Cup	Fifth round	28 November 2017	Semi-finals	18 April 2018
Europa League	Second qualifying round	13 July 2017	Second qualifying round	20 July 2017

=== Pre-season, mid-season and friendlies ===
2 July 2017 Pre-season	Galatasaray (Turkey)	1–0	(Hungary) Gyirmót SE	Šamorín, Slovakia
19:30 CET	Donk 90' (pen.)	Report		Stadium: Šamorín X-Bionic Stadium

8 July 2017 Pre-season	Galatasaray (Turkey)	2–0	(Hungary) Diósgyőr	Győr, Hungary
19:30 CET	Belhanda 34' (pen.); Derdiyok 58' (pen.)	Report		Stadium: ETO Park; Referee: Juhasz Balint

27 July 2017 Pre-season	Galatasaray (Turkey)	2–1	(Turkey) Eskişehirspor	Istanbul, Turkey
19:30 FET	Maicon 57'; Belhanda 58'	Report	Mezenga 45'	Stadium: Atatürk Olympic Stadium

31 July 2017 Pre-season	Galatasaray (Turkey)	1–1	(Turkey) Akhisar Belediyespor	Bad Waltersdorf, Austria
19:30 FET	Rodrigues 19'	Report	Aydoğdu 48'	Stadium: Thermenstadion Bad Waltersdorf

5 August 2017 Pre-season	Galatasaray (Turkey)	1–2	(Germany) Hertha BSC	Kapfenberg, Austria
18:00 CET	Derdiyok 60'	Report	Rekik 3'; Ibišević 74'	Stadium: Franz Fekete Stadium

2 September 2017 Friendly	Galatasaray (Turkey)	4–2	(Turkey) Eyüpspor	Istanbul, Turkey
17:15 FET	Gül 12'; Feghouli 42'; Başsan 43'; Denayer 76'	Report	Bayraktaroğlu 79'; Erten 83' (pen.)	Stadium: Eyüp Stadyumu; Referee: Emre Malok

11 November 2017 Friendly	Galatasaray (Turkey)	3–2	(Turkey) Ümraniyespor	Istanbul, Turkey
17:00 FET	Derdiyok 45'; Öztekin 75' (pen.); Gümüş 83'	Report	Rangelov 48' (pen.), 81'	Stadium: Türk Telekom Stadium

14 January 2018 Mid-season	Galatasaray (Turkey)	2–0	(Romania) Viitorul Constanța	Belek, Turkey
17:00 FET	Rodrigues 60'; Horj 66' (o.g.)	Report		Stadium: Sueno Hotels Deluxe Belek; Referee: Çağatay Şahan

15 January 2018 Mid-season	Galatasaray (Turkey)	5–0	(Turkey) Tuzlaspor	Belek, Turkey
17:00 FET	Gomis 1'; İnan 8'; Rodrigues 10', 12'; Denayer 40'; Feghouli (yellow card)	Report		Stadium: Sueno Hotels Deluxe Belek; Referee: Emre Kargın

=== Süper Lig ===
==== League table ====
Pos	Team	Pld	W	D	L	GF	GA	GD	Pts	Qualification or relegation
1	Galatasaray (C)	34	24	3	7	75	33	+42	75	Qualification for the Champions League group stage
2	Fenerbahçe	34	21	9	4	78	36	+42	72 (Note: Fenerbahçe ahead of Başakşehir on head-to-head goal difference: Fenerbahçe 2–3 Başakşehir, Başakşehir 0–2 Fenerbahçe.)	Qualification for the Champions League third qualifying round
3	Başakşehir	34	22	6	6	62	34	+28	72	Qualification for the Europa League third qualifying round
4	Beşiktaş	34	21	8	5	69	30	+39	71	Qualification for the Europa League second qualifying round
5	Trabzonspor	34	15	10	9	63	51	+12	55	

Source: Süper Lig, Soccerway
Rules for classification: 1) Points; 2) Head-to-head points; 3) Head-to-head goal difference; 4) Head-to-head goals scored; 5) Goal difference; 6) Goals scored; 7) Play-off.
(C) Champions

==== Results summary ====
Overall								Home						Away					
Pld	W	D	L	GF	GA	GD	Pts	W	D	L	GF	GA	GD	W	D	L	GF	GA	GD
34	24	3	7	75	33	+42	75	16	1	0	46	9	+37	8	2	7	29	24	+5

Source: Competitive Matches

==== Results by round ====
Round	1	2	3	4	5	6	7	8	9	10	11	12	13	14	15	16	17	18	19	20	21	22	23	24	25	26	27	28	29	30	31	32	33	34
Ground	H	A	H	A	H	A	H	A	H	A	H	A	H	A	H	A	H	A	H	A	H	A	H	A	H	A	H	A	H	A	H	A	H	A
Result	W	W	W	D	W	W	W	W	D	L	W	L	W	L	W	L	W	W	W	L	W	L	W	W	W	D	W	L	W	W	W	W	W	W
Position	1	1	1	1	1	1	1	1	1	1	1	1	1	2	1	3	2	2	2	2	1	2	1	1	1	1	1	2	1	1	1	1	1	1

Source: Competitive Matches
A = Away; H = Home; W = Win; D = Draw; L = Loss

==== Matches ====
14 August 2017 1	Galatasaray	4–1	Kayserispor	Istanbul
20:45 TRT	Ciğerci 16'; Belhanda (yellow card) 18', (goal) 35'; Gomis 37', 87'; Gümüş (yellow card) 90+2'	Report	Fernando Boldrin (yellow card) 18'; Espinoza (yellow card) 19'; Gülen 29'; Lopes (yellow card) 40' (yellow-red card) 85'	Stadium: Türk Telekom Stadı; Attendance: 31,394; Referee: Halis Özkahya

19 August 2017 2	Osmanlıspor	1–3	Galatasaray	Ankara
20:45 TRT	Kılıç (yellow card) 52'; Gürler 58'; Vršajević (yellow card) 71'	Report	Maicon 14'; Gomis 31'; Ciğerci 56'; Ndiaye (yellow card) 65'; Fernando (yellow card) 75'	Stadium: Osmanlı Stadium; Attendance: 6,703; Referee: Halil Meler

25 August 2017 3	Galatasaray	3–0	Sivasspor	Istanbul
20:45 TRT	Mariano (yellow card) 10'; Ciğerci 41', 71', (yellow card) 75'; Aziz (yellow card) 45'; Gomis 83' (pen.)	Report		Stadium: Türk Telekom Stadium; Attendance: 44,693; Referee: Ali Palabıyık

10 September 2017 4	Antalyaspor	1–1	Galatasaray	Antalya
19:00 TRT	Eto'o 82'		Gomis 34'; Linnes (yellow card) 69'	Stadium: Antalya Stadium; Attendance: 26,271; Referee: Halis Özkahya

16 September 2017 5	Galatasaray	2–0	Kasımpaşa	Istanbul
19:00 TRT	Gomis 44', 79'; Aziz (yellow card) 90'		Edok (yellow card) 30'; Pavelka (yellow card) 34'; Veigneau (yellow card) 76'; Sadiku (yellow card) 84'	Stadium: Türk Telekom Stadium; Attendance: 41,688; Referee: Cüneyt Çakır

24 September 2017 6	Bursaspor	1–2	Galatasaray	Bursa
18:30 TRT	Delarge 14'		Aziz (yellow card) 68'; Feghouli 73'; Maicon (yellow card) 75'; Ciğerci 81'	Stadium: Bursa Stadium; Attendance: 32,677; Referee: Fırat Aydınus

30 September 2017 7	Galatasaray	3–2	Karabükspor	Istanbul
18:30 TRT	Feghouli 17', (yellow card) 82'; Maicon 22', 90', (yellow card) 90+1'; Fernando (yellow card) 82'; Latovlevici (yellow card) 90+3'		Skúlason (yellow card) 16'; Yatabaré 27'; Seleznyov 84'; Gülselam (yellow card) 85'; Başdaş (yellow card) 89'	Stadium: Türk Telekom Stadium; Attendance: 40,973; Referee: Alper Ulusoy

14 October 2017 8	Konyaspor	0–2	Galatasaray	Konya
18:30 TRT	Jønsson (yellow card) 60'; Turan (yellow card) 77'		Ndiaye (yellow card) 24'; Gomis 54', 77'	Stadium: Konya Büyükşehir Stadium; Attendance: 1,862; Referee: Özgür Yankaya

22 October 2017 9	Galatasaray	0–0	Fenerbahçe	Istanbul
18:30 TRT	Mariano (yellow card) 10'; Maicon (yellow card) 24'; Belhanda (yellow card) 34' (yellow-red card) 73'; Fernando (yellow card) 53'		Neto (yellow card) 44'; Potuk (yellow card) 77'	Stadium: Türk Telekom Stadium; Attendance: 50,291; Referee: Cüneyt Çakır

29 October 2017 10	Trabzonspor	2–1	Galatasaray	Trabzon
18:30 TRT	Şahan (red card) 45'; N'Doye 49'; Yazıcı 69'	Report	Ndiaye (yellow card) 15' (yellow-red card) 90+2'; Muslera (yellow card) 29'; Feghouli (red card) 45'; Maicon (yellow card) 78'; Rodrigues 86', (yellow card) 86'	Stadium: Şenol Güneş Stadium; Attendance: 35,000; Referee: Halis Özkahya

3 November 2017 11	Galatasaray	5–1	Gençlerbirliği	Istanbul
19:00 TRT	Mariano 7'; Maicon 43'; Gomis 46', 81' (pen.); Ciğerci 50'; Aziz (yellow card) 88'	Report	Guidileye (yellow card) 42'; Duruer (yellow card) 62'; Issah (yellow card) 67'; Palitsevich (yellow card) 72'; Luccas Claro (yellow card) 81'; Šćekić 84'	Stadium: Türk Telekom Stadium; Attendance: 35,201; Referee: Serkan Çınar

18 November 2017 12	İstanbul Başakşehir	5–1	Galatasaray	Istanbul
18:30 TRT	Attamah 25'; Adebayor 42', 58', 76' (pen.); Frei 89'	Report	Fernando (yellow card) 20'; Gomis 55'; Ndiaye (yellow card) 65'	Stadium: Başakşehir Fatih Terim Stadium; Attendance: 15,000; Referee: Ali Palabıyık

25 November 2017 13	Galatasaray	2–0	Alanyaspor	Istanbul
18:30 TRT	Öztekin 33'; Aziz (yellow card) 83'; Gomis 88'	Report	Tzavellas (yellow card) 37'; Akbaba (yellow card) 43'; Gassama (yellow card) 45+3'; Lungu (yellow card) 71'; Welinton (yellow card) 86'	Stadium: Türk Telekom Stadium; Attendance: 36,642; Referee: Hüseyin Göçek

2 December 2017 14	Beşiktaş	3–0	Galatasaray	Istanbul
18:30 TRT	Pepe (yellow card) 25'; Tosun 46', (yellow card) 61'; Arslan (yellow card) 53'; Tošić 70'; Negredo 90'	Report	Feghouli (yellow card) 35'; Fernando (yellow card) 49'; Gomis (yellow card) 65'	Stadium: Vodafone Park; Attendance: 39,492; Referee: Fırat Aydınus

9 December 2017 15	Galatasaray	4–2	Akhisar Belediyespor	Istanbul
18:30 TRT	Öztekin (yellow card) 17'; Fernando 49'; Gomis 51', (red card) 68'; Feghouli (yellow card) 55', (goal) 90+4'; Belhanda 70'; Muslera (yellow card) 90+2'	Report	Maicon 17' (o.g.); Lopes (yellow card) 19' (red card) 43'; Sissoko (yellow card) 36'; Adın 45', (yellow card) 63'; Taşdelen (yellow card) 89'	Stadium: Türk Telekom Stadium; Attendance: 30,792; Referee: Ümit Öztürk

17 December 2017 16	Yeni Malatyaspor	2–1	Galatasaray	Malatya
16:30 TRT	Pereira 38'; Boutaïb 43'; Cissokho (yellow card) 81'; Çağıran (yellow card) 88'	Report	Ndiaye 74'	Stadium: Malatya Arena; Attendance: 21,677; Referee: Ali Palabıyık

24 December 2017 17	Galatasaray	3–1	Göztepe	Istanbul
19:30 TRT	Muslera (yellow card) 8'; Rodrigues 19'; Maicon (yellow card) 34', (goal) 70'; Fernando (yellow card) 44'; Öztekin 53'; Günter (yellow card) 60'	Report	Jahović 9' (pen.); Rotman (yellow card) 57'; Castro (yellow card) 72'	Stadium: Türk Telekom Stadium; Attendance: 46,374; Referee: Yaşar Kemal Uğurlu

22 January 2018 18	Kayserispor	1–3	Galatasaray	Kayseri
18:00 TRT	Boldrin (yellow card) 20'; Bulut (yellow card) 29', (goal) 52'	Report	Derdiyok 12', 18'; Rodrigues 90+1'	Stadium: Kadir Has Stadium; Attendance: 22,414; Referee: Cüneyt Çakır

27 January 2018 19	Galatasaray	2–0	Osmanlispor	Istanbul
17:00 TRT	Feghouli 37'; Gomis 88'	Report	Güven (yellow card) 33'	Stadium: Türk Telekom Stadium; Attendance: 36,750; Referee: Halil Umut Meler

4 February 2018 20	Sivasspor	2–1	Galatasaray	Sivas
19:00 TRT	Ndinga 16'; Koné 57' (pen.)	Report	Derdiyok 79'	Stadium: 4 Eylül Stadium; Referee: Fırat Aydınus

12 February 2018 21	Galatasaray	3–0	Antalyaspor	Istanbul
20:00 TRT				Stadium: Türk Telekom Stadium; Attendance: 33,958; Referee: Barış Şimşek

18 February 2018 22	Kasımpaşa	2–1	Galatasaray	Istanbul
19:00 TRT				Stadium: Recep Tayyip Erdoğan Stadium; Referee: Halis Özkahya

23 February 2018 23	Galatasaray	5–0	Bursaspor	Istanbul
20:00 TRT				Stadium: Türk Telekom Stadium; Attendance: 36,812; Referee: Bülent Yıldırım

3 March 2018 24	Karabükspor	0–7	Galatasaray	Karabük
19:00 TRT				Stadium: Dr. Necmettin Şeyhoğlu Stadium; Attendance: 6,768; Referee: Mete Kalkavan

11 March 2018 25	Galatasaray	2–1	Konyaspor	Istanbul
19:00 TRT				Stadium: Türk Telekom Stadium; Attendance: 42,587; Referee: Halil Umut Meler

17 March 2018 26	Fenerbahçe	0–0	Galatasaray	Istanbul
19:00 TRT				Stadium: Şükrü Saracoğlu Stadium; Attendance: 45,375; Referee: Bülent Yıldırım

1 April 2018 27	Galatasaray	2–1	Trabzonspor	Istanbul
19:00 TRT				Stadium: Türk Telekom Stadium; Attendance: 46,934; Referee: Fırat Aydınus

9 April 2018 28	Gençlerbirliği	1–0	Galatasaray	Ankara
20:00 TRT				Stadium: 19 Mayıs Stadium; Referee: Cüneyt Çakır

15 April 2018 29	Galatasaray	2–0	Başakşehir	Istanbul
19:00 TRT				Stadium: Türk Telekom Stadium; Referee: Halil Umut Meler

21 April 2018 30	Alanyaspor	2–3	Galatasaray	Alanya
19:00 TRT				Stadium: Bahçeşehir Okulları Stadium; Referee: Ümit Öztürk

29 April 2018 31	Galatasaray	2–0	Beşiktaş	Istanbul
19:00 TRT	Belhanda (yellow card) 4'; Fernando 23', (yellow card) 90'; Rodrigues 70'	Report	Adriano (yellow card) 45'; Talisca (yellow card) 76'	Stadium: Türk Telekom Stadium; Attendance: 50,304; Referee: Fırat Aydınus

6 May 2018 32	Akhisar Belediyespor	1–2	Galatasaray	Akhisar
19:00 TRT		Report		Stadium: Spor Toto Akhisar Stadium; Referee: Ali Palabıyık

12 May 2018 33	Galatasaray	2–0	Malatyaspor	Istanbul
19:00 TRT		Report		Stadium: Türk Telekom Stadium; Attendance: 45,652; Referee: Bülent Yıldırım

19 May 2018 34	Göztepe	0–1	Galatasaray	İzmir
19:00 TRT		Report		Stadium: Bornova Stadium; Referee: Cüneyt Çakır

=== Turkish Cup ===
==== Fifth round ====
28 November 2017 First leg	Galatasaray	5–1	Sivas Belediyespor	Istanbul
20:30 TRT	Öztekin 4', 75', (yellow card) 57'; Başsan (yellow card) 48', (goal) 70'; Çalık (yellow card) 85'; Gümüş 87'; Derdiyok 90'	Report	Kılıçoğlu (yellow card) 23'; Akaydın 78'	Stadium: Türk Telekom Stadium; Attendance: 9,633; Referee: Suat Arslanboga

12 December 2017 Second leg	Sivas Belediyespor	2–1	Galatasaray	Sivas
19:30 TRT	Katanalp 43'; Aydın 90'		Gümüş 10'	Stadium: 4 Eylül Stadium; Referee: Serkan Tokat

==== Round of 16 ====
26 December 2017 First leg	Galatasaray	3–0	Bucaspor	Istanbul
20:30 TRT	İnan 14'; Gümüş 41', 43'	Report		Stadium: Türk Telekom Stadium; Attendance: 9,737; Referee: Suat Arslanboğa

18 January 2018 Second Leg	Bucaspor	0–3	Galatasaray	Buca
20:30 TRT	Yıldırım (yellow card) 12'	Report	Gomis 33'; Öztekin 44'; Feghouli 53'	Stadium: Buca Arena; Referee: Serkan Tokat

==== Quarter-finals ====
1 February 2018 First leg	Konyaspor	2–2	Galatasaray	Konya
20:30 TRT	Linnes 40' (o.g.); Ay (yellow card) 58'; Jahović 90'	Report	Gümüş 50'; Aziz 55'	Stadium: Konya Büyükşehir Stadium; Referee: Bülent Yıldırım

8 February 2018 Second leg	Galatasaray	4–1	Konyaspor	Istanbul
20:30 TRT		Report		Stadium: Türk Telekom Stadium

==== Semi-finals ====
27 February 2018 First leg	Akhisarspor	1–2	Galatasaray	Akhisar
20:30 TRT				Stadium: Spor Toto Akhisar Stadium

18 April 2018 Second leg	Galatasaray	0–2	Akhisarspor	Istanbul
20:30 TRT			Seleznyov 4', 35'	Stadium: Türk Telekom Stadium; Referee: Barış Şimşek

=== UEFA Europa League ===
==== Second qualifying round ====
13 July 2017 First leg	Östersunds FK (Sweden)	2–0	(Turkey) Galatasaray	Östersund, Sweden
19:00 CET	Gero (yellow card) 18'; Pettersson (yellow card) 35'; Ghoddos 68'; Hopcutt 90+2'	Report	Ciğerci (yellow card) 17'; Öztekin (yellow card) 90+4'	Stadium: Jämtkraft Arena; Attendance: 5,407; Referee: (Spain) Juan Martínez Munuera

20 July 2017 Second leg	Galatasaray (Turkey)	1–1	(Sweden) Östersunds FK	Istanbul, Turkey
20:30 TRT	Gomis (yellow card) 20'; Muslera (yellow card) 39'; Ciğerci (yellow card) 49'; Çalık 69'; Rodrigues (yellow card) 87'; Belhanda (yellow card) 90+2'	Report	Nouri 60'	Stadium: Türk Telekom Stadium; Attendance: 33,646; Referee: (Germany) Bastian Dankert

== Statistics ==
=== Squad statistics ===
No.	Pos.	Nat.	Player	Süper Lig				Turkish Cup				Europa League				Total			
No.	Pos.	Nat.	Player	Apps	Goal	Yellow card	Red card	Apps	Goal	Yellow card	Red card	Apps	Goal	Yellow card	Red card	Apps	Goal	Yellow card	Red card
1	GK	(Uruguay)	Fernando Muslera	18	0	2	0	0	0	0	0	2	0	1	0	20	0	3	0
2	DF	(Brazil)	Mariano	16	1	2	0	1	0	0	0	0	0	0	0	17	1	2	0
3	DF	(Brazil)	Maicon	17	5	4	0	1	0	0	0	2	0	0	0	20	5	4	0
4	DF	(Turkey)	Serdar Aziz	15	1	5	0	0	0	0	0	0	0	0	0	15	1	5	0
5	DF	(Turkey)	Ahmet Çalık	3	0	0	0	3	0	1	0	2	1	0	0	8	1	1	0
6	MF	(Turkey)	Tolga Ciğerci	11	6	1	0	2	0	0	0	2	0	2	0	15	6	3	0
7	FW	(Turkey)	Yasin Öztekin	10	2	1	0	3	3	1	0	2	0	1	0	15	5	3	0
8	MF	(Turkey)	Selçuk İnan	10	0	0	0	4	1	0	0	2	0	0	0	16	1	0	0
9	MF	(Switzerland)	Eren Derdiyok	12	2	0	0	4	1	0	0	2	0	0	0	18	3	0	0
10	FW	(Morocco)	Younès Belhanda	16	2	1	1	1	0	0	0	1	0	1	0	18	2	2	1
11	FW	(Turkey)	Sinan Gümüş	5	0	1	0	4	4	0	0	2	0	0	0	11	4	1	0
14	DF	(Norway)	Martin Linnes	11	0	1	0	2	0	0	0	2	0	0	0	15	0	1	0
15	MF	(Netherlands)	Ryan Donk	1	0	0	0	4	0	0	0	0	0	0	0	5	0	0	0
16	GK	(France)	Cédric Carrasso	0	0	0	0	1	0	0	0	0	0	0	0	1	0	0	0
18	FW	(France)	Bafétimbi Gomis	17	14	1	1	1	1	0	0	2	0	1	0	20	15	2	1
21	DF	(Turkey)	Tarık Çamdal	0	0	0	0	3	0	1	0	0	0	0	0	3	0	1	0
24	MF	(Cape Verde)	Garry Rodrigues	17	3	1	0	1	0	0	0	2	0	1	0	20	3	2	0
25	MF	(Brazil)	Fernando	16	1	6	0	0	0	0	0	0	0	0	0	16	1	6	0
28	DF	(Turkey)	Koray Günter	3	0	1	0	4	0	0	0	0	0	0	0	7	0	1	0
33	DF	(Romania)	Iasmin Latovlevici	9	0	1	0	2	0	0	0	0	0	0	0	11	0	1	0
37	MF	(Turkey)	Recep Gül	0	0	0	0	3	0	0	0	0	0	0	0	3	0	0	0
46	MF	(Turkey)	Barış Zeren	0	0	0	0	2	0	0	0	0	0	0	0	2	0	0	0
51	DF	(Turkey)	Ali Ülgen	0	0	0	0	1	0	0	0	0	0	0	0	1	0	0	0
64	DF	(Belgium)	Jason Denayer	14	0	1	0	0	0	0	0	0	0	0	0	14	0	1	0
67	GK	(Turkey)	Eray İşcan	0	0	0	0	3	0	0	0	0	0	0	0	3	0	0	0
88	MF	(Turkey)	Gökay Güney	0	0	0	0	3	0	0	0	0	0	0	0	3	0	0	0
89	MF	(Algeria)	Sofiane Feghouli	12	3	3	0	2	1	0	0	0	0	0	0	14	4	3	0
98	DF	(Turkey)	Sefa Özdemir	0	0	0	0	0	0	0	0	0	0	0	0	0	0	0	0
Players who left the squad during the season
17	MF	(Turkey)	Emrah Başsan	0	0	0	0	2	1	0	1	1	0	0	0	3	1	1	0
20	MF	(Senegal)	Badou Ndiaye	17	1	3	1	0	0	0	0	0	0	0	0	17	1	3	1
23	DF	(France)	Lionel Carole	0	0	0	0	0	0	0	0	2	0	0	0	2	0	0	0

Last updated: 1 February 2018.

=== Clean sheets ===
Rank	Player	Süper Lig	Turkish Cup	Europa League	Total
1	(Uruguay) Fernando Muslera	8	0	0	8
2	(Turkey) Eray İşcan	0	2	0	2
3	(France) Cédric Carrasso	1	0	0	1
Total		5	2	0	7

Last updated: 11 March 2018.

=== Overall ===
	Total	Home	Away	Neutral
Games played	-	-	-	-
Games won	-	-	-	-
Games drawn	-	-	-	-
Games lost	-	-	-	-
Biggest win	-	-	-	-
Biggest loss	-	-	-	-
Biggest win (League)	-	-	-	-
Biggest win (Cup)	-	-	-	-
Biggest win (UEFA)	-	-	-	-
Biggest win (Super Cup)	-	-	-	-
Biggest loss (League)	-	-	-	-
Biggest loss (Cup)	-	-	-	-
Biggest loss (UEFA)	-	-	-	-
Biggest loss (Super Cup)	-	-	-	-
Clean sheets	-	-	-	-
Goals scored	-	-	-	-
Goals conceded	-	-	-	-
Goal difference	-	-	-	-
Average GF per game	0	0	0	0
Average GA per game	0	0	0	0
Yellow cards	-	–		
Red cards	-	–		
Most appearances	-	–		
Most minutes played	-	–		
Most goals	-	–		
Most assists	-	–		
Points	-	-	-	-
Winning rate	0%	0%	0%	0%

=== Attendances ===
Competition	Total. Att.	Avg. Att.
Süper Lig	698,284	41,076
Turkish Cup	68,174	17,044
Europa League	33,646	33,646
Total	800,104	36,368

- Sold season tickets: 39,000 & 197 suites = 41,167

== See also ==
- 2017–18 Süper Lig
- 2017–18 Turkish Cup
- 2017–18 UEFA Europa League
