= Ahmet Yılmaz Çalık =

Turkish footballer (1994–2022)

Ahmet Çalık
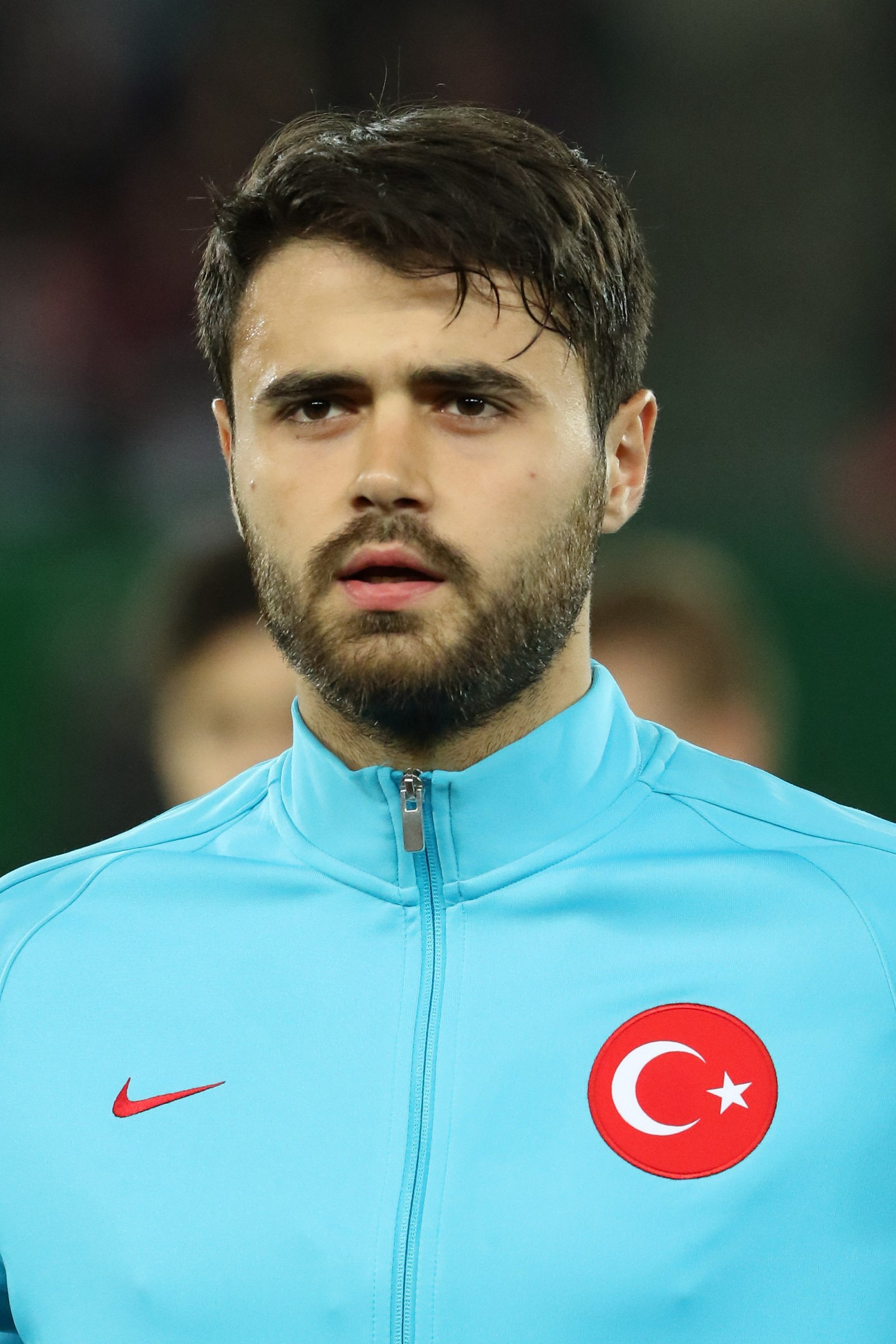
- Çalık with Turkey in 2016

Personal information
- Full name: Ahmet Yılmaz Çalık
- Date of birth: 26 February 1994
- Place of birth: Yenimahalle, Ankara, Turkey
- Date of death: 11 January 2022 (aged 27)
- Place of death: Gölbaşı, Ankara, Turkey
- Height: 1.84 m (6 ft 0 in)
- Position: Centre-back

Youth career
- 2005–2011: Gençlerbirliği

Senior career*
Years	Team	Apps	(Gls)
2011–2017	Gençlerbirliği	109	(4)
2017–2020	Galatasaray	36	(1)
2020–2022	Konyaspor	47	(1)
Total		192	(6)

International career
2010	Turkey U16	3	(1)
2010–2011	Turkey U17	14	(2)
2011–2012	Turkey U18	6	(0)
2012–2013	Turkey U19	22	(2)
2012–2013	Turkey U20	11	(0)
2013–2015	Turkey U21	12	(0)
2015–2017	Turkey	8	(1)
- * Club domestic league appearances and goals

Ahmet Yılmaz Çalık (26 February 1994 – 11 January 2022) was a Turkish professional footballer who played as a centre-back for Gençlerbirliği, Galatasaray, Konyaspor, and the Turkey national team.

== International career ==
Çalık represented Turkey at the 2013 UEFA U-19 Championship and 2013 FIFA U-20 World Cup.

On 6 November 2015, Çalık was selected for the Turkey national team to play friendlies against Qatar and Greece respectively. He made his debut in a 0–0 draw with Greece. He was part of the Turkish squad for the Euro 2016, but ended up not playing in the tournament.

He scored his first senior international goal in a friendly March 2017 victory over Moldova. This was also his last international game.

== Career statistics ==
=== Club ===
As of 20 November 2023

Appearances and goals by club, season and competition
Club	Season	League			National Cup		Continental		Other		Total	
Club	Season	Division	Apps	Goals	Apps	Goals	Apps	Goals	Apps	Goals	Apps	Goals
Gençlerbirliği	2011–12	Süper Lig	0	0	0	0	—		3 (Note: Appearances in Spor Toto Cup)	0	3	0
Gençlerbirliği	2012–13	Süper Lig	5	0	0	0	—		—		5	0
Gençlerbirliği	2013–14	Süper Lig	29	2	1	0	—		—		30	2
Gençlerbirliği	2014–15	Süper Lig	29	0	6	0	—		—		35	0
Gençlerbirliği	2015–16	Süper Lig	30	2	1	0	—		—		31	2
Gençlerbirliği	2016–17	Süper Lig	16	0	2	0	—		—		18	0
Gençlerbirliği	Total		109	4	10	0	0	0	3	0	122	4
Galatasaray	2016–17	Süper Lig	14	1	0	0	0	0	—		14	1
Galatasaray	2017–18	Süper Lig	4	0	5	1	2 (Note: Appearances in UEFA Europa League)	1	—		11	2
Galatasaray	2018–19	Süper Lig	7	0	6	0	0	0	—		13	0
Galatasaray	2019–20	Süper Lig	11	0	4	0	0	0	—		15	0
Galatasaray	Total		36	1	15	1	2	1	0	0	53	3
Konyaspor	2020–21	Süper Lig	29	1	4	0	—		—		33	1
Konyaspor	2021–22	Süper Lig	18	0	0	0	—		—		18	0
Konyaspor	Total		47	1	4	0	0	0	0	0	51	1
Career total			192	6	32	1	2	1	3	0	226	8

=== International ===
Scores and results list Turkey's goal tally first, score column indicates score after each Çalık goal.

List of international goals scored by Ahmet Yılmaz Çalık
No.	Date	Venue	Opponent	Score	Result	Competition
1	27 March 2017	New Eskişehir Stadium, Eskişehir, Turkey	Moldova	2–0	3–1	Friendly

== Style of play ==
Çalık was a central centre-back and man-marker, he was athletic and relied mostly on his pace and timing.

== Death ==
Çalık died in a traffic accident in Ankara on 11 January 2022 at the age of 27. The 2021–22 Süper Lig season was subsequently named in his honour.

== Honours ==
Galatasaray

- Süper Lig: 2017–18, 2018–19
- Turkish Cup: 2018–19
- Turkish Super Cup: 2019
