= Sardar Patel Stadium =

Sardar Patel Stadium or Sardar Vallabhbhai Patel Stadium may refer to:

- Sardar Patel Gujarat Stadium, a former international cricket stadium in Motera, Ahmedabad, Gujarat
- Sardar Vallabhbhai Patel Stadium, Navrangpura, a multi-purpose stadium in Navrangpura, Ahmedabad, Gujarat
- Sardar Vallabhbhai Patel Stadium, Valsad, a cricket stadium in Valsad, Gujarat
- Sardar Vallabhbhai Patel Indoor Stadium, an indoor stadium in Mumbai, Maharashtra
- Sardar Vallabhbhai Patel International Hockey Stadium, a field hockey stadium in Raipur, Chhattisgarh
- Sardar Patel Stadium, Mehsana, a multi-purpose stadium in Mehsana, Gujarat

== See also ==
- Narendra Modi Stadium, an international cricket stadium in Ahmedabad, Gujarat, which replaced the Sardar Patel Gujarat Stadium (Motera) in 2020
