= Salar =

Salar may refer to:

== People ==
- Salar people, a Turkic ethnic minority in China
  - Salar language
- Salar (name), including a list of people with the name
- Sayf al-Din Salar (c. 1260s–1310), viceroy of the Mamluk sultan al-Nasir Muhammad

== Places ==
- Salar, Spain
- Salar, Murshidabad, India
  - Salar railway station
- Salar, Afyonkarahisar, Turkey
- Salar, Uzbekistan
- Kampong Salar, Mukim Mentiri, Brunei

== Other uses ==
- Salar, the Iranian brand name of Solero (ice cream)

== See also ==
- Sardar (disambiguation)
- Salaar: Part 1 – Ceasefire, 2023 Indian film
- Salares, a town in Málaga, Andalusia, Spain
- Ispahsalar, a title for the commander-in-chief of medieval Islamic armies
