= Sinan Gümüş =

German footballer (born 1994)

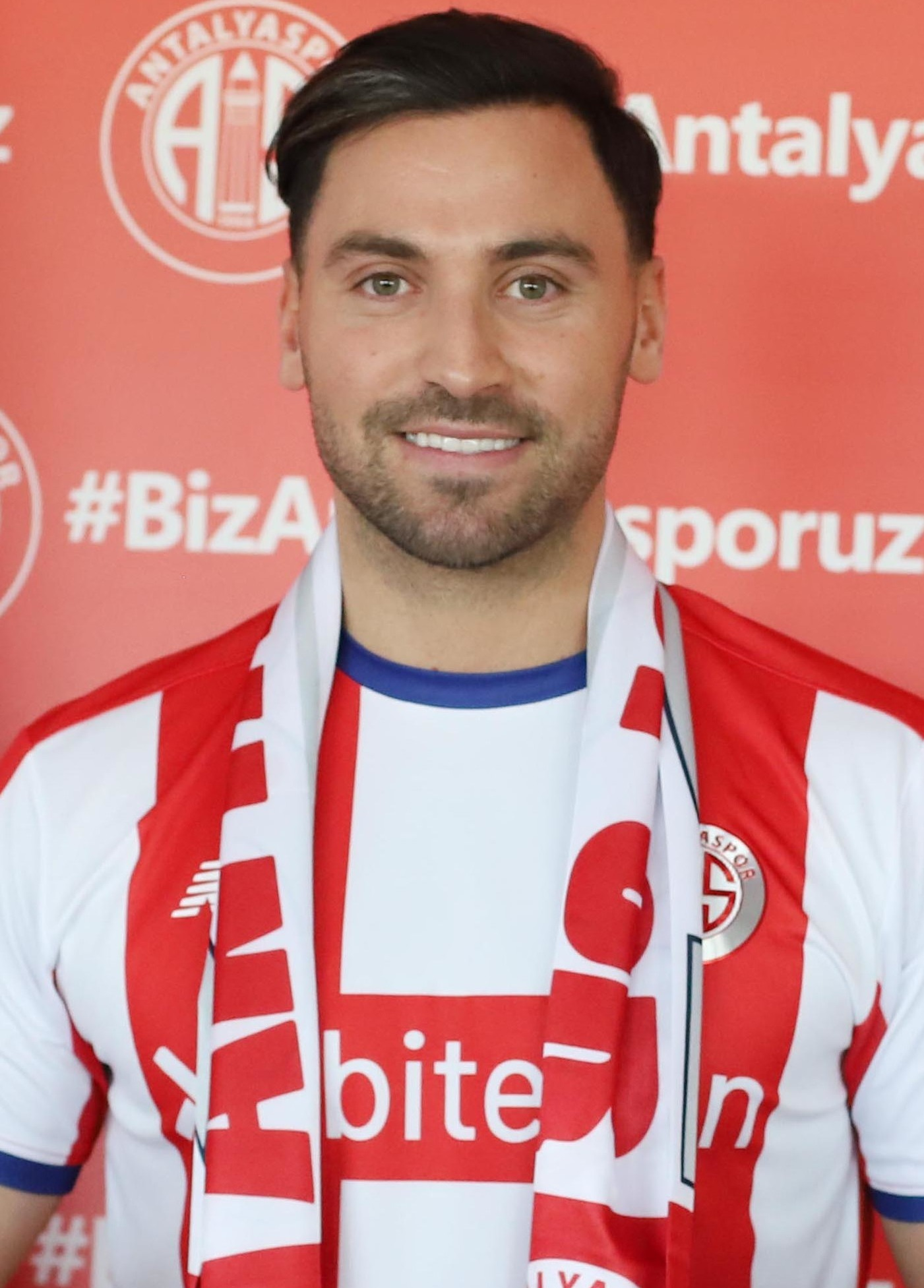
- Gümüş with Antalyaspor in 2022

Personal information
- Full name: Sinan Gümüş
- Date of birth: 15 January 1994 (age 32)
- Place of birth: Pfullendorf, Germany
- Height: 1.80 m (5 ft 11 in)
- Position: Forward

Youth career
- TSV Aach-Linz
- 2010–2011: SC Pfullendorf
- 2011–2013: VfB Stuttgart

Senior career*
Years	Team	Apps	(Gls)
2013–2014	VfB Stuttgart II	32	(1)
2014–2019	Galatasaray	75	(19)
2019–2020	Genoa	3	(0)
2020	→ Antalyaspor (loan)	10	(5)
2020–2022	Fenerbahçe	18	(3)
2022–2024	Antalyaspor	20	(0)
2024–2025	Eyüpspor	11	(0)

International career^{‡}
2013	Germany U20	3	(1)
- * Club domestic league appearances and goals as of 16 June 2025 ‡ National team caps and goals as of 15 April 2018

Sinan Gümüş (born 15 January 1994) is a Turkish professional footballer who currently plays as a forward for Turkish football club Eyüpspor.

== Club career ==
=== Early years ===
Born in Pfullendorf to Turkish parents, Gümüş is a youth product of TSV Aach-Linz and SC Pfullendorf. In 2011, after having spent ten years there, he moved to VfB Stuttgart's youth academy, signing a three-year contract. After the contract had expired, he left the club.

=== Galatasaray ===
In July 2014, Gümüş joined Turkish club Galatasaray on a free transfer, signing a five-year contract. Other Turkish teams had also been interested in signing him. He made his first-team debut in the Turkish Cup on 16 December 2014, coming on in the second half with one goal and assist in a 9–1 win.

He made his league debut on 12 September 2015 and scored his first goal in the league on 27 December 2015. He continued his goalscoring run both in the league and the cup; scoring six goals plus one assist in seven games between December 2015 and January 2016. He scored his first hat-trick for the club in a 4–1 cup win against Kastamonuspor on 26 January 2016. On 19 May 2016, Gümüş scored another hat-trick in the last match of the season.

On 11 March 2018, Sinan Gümüş came on as a sub for Ryan Donk against Konyaspor in the second half when the score was 0–1 to the opponent, he went on to contribute one goal and one assist consequently winning the game 2–1 and being awarded man of the match.

=== Genoa ===
On 2 July 2019, Gümüş signed with Italian Serie A club Genoa.

==== Loan to Antalyaspor ====
On 20 January 2020, Gümüş joined Antalyaspor on loan until 30 June 2020.

=== Fenerbahçe ===
On 19 August 2020, Gümüş signed with another Süper Lig club Fenerbahçe. He made his debut with the club in a 2–1 away win over Çaykur Rizespor as a substitute for Ferdi Kadıoğlu in the 65th minute on 11 September 2020. He scored his first goal for the club in a 2–1 home win against Alanyaspor on 7 January 2021.

On 8 February 2022, his contract with Fenerbahçe was terminated.

=== Return to Antalyaspor ===
On 8 February 2022, Gümüş signed a two-and-a-half-year deal with Antalyaspor.

== International career ==
In October 2013, Gümüş earned three caps for the Germany U20 team.

== Career statistics ==
=== Club ===
As of match played 14 August 2022

Appearances and goals by club, season and competition
Club	Season	League			Cup		Europe		Other		Total	
Club	Season	Division	Apps	Goals	Apps	Goals	Apps	Goals	Apps	Goals	Apps	Goals
Galatasaray	2014–15	Süper Lig	4	0	6	1	0	0	0	0	10	1
Galatasaray	2015–16	Süper Lig	15	5	8	6	3	0	0	0	26	11
Galatasaray	2016–17	Süper Lig	18	7	2	0	0	0	1 (Note: Appearance in Super Cup)	0	21	7
Galatasaray	2017–18	Süper Lig	19	3	8	6	2	0	0	0	29	9
Galatasaray	2018–19	Süper Lig	19	4	6	1	5	0	0	0	30	5
Galatasaray	Total		75	19	30	14	10	0	1	0	116	33
Genoa	2019–20	Serie A	3	0	0	0	0	0	0	0	3	0
Antalyaspor (loan)	2019–20	Süper Lig	10	5	3	0	0	0	0	0	13	5
Fenerbahçe	2020–21	Süper Lig	18	3	2	0	0	0	0	0	20	3
Fenerbahçe	2021–22	Süper Lig	0	0	0	0	0	0	0	0	0	0
Fenerbahçe	Total		18	3	2	0	0	0	0	0	20	3
Antalyaspor	2021–22	Süper Lig	6	0	1	0	0	0	0	0	7	0
Antalyaspor	2022–23	Süper Lig	1	0	0	0	0	0	0	0	1	0
Antalyaspor	Total		7	0	1	0	0	0	0	0	8	0
Career total			113	27	36	14	10	0	1	0	160	41

== Honours ==
Galatasaray

- Süper Lig: 2014–15, 2017–18, 2018–19
- Türkiye Kupası: 2014–15, 2015–16, 2018–19
- Süper Kupa: 2015, 2016
