= Ruud Boffin =

Belgian footballer

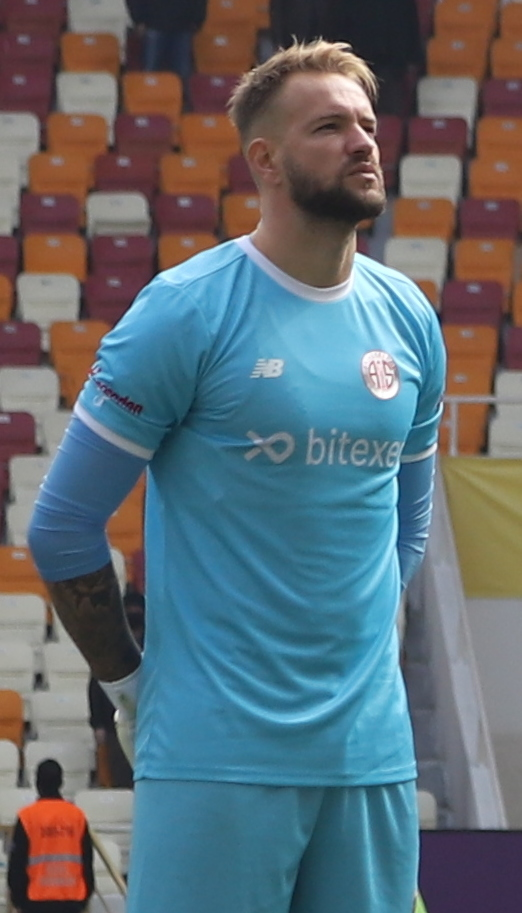
- Boffin with Antalyaspor in 2022.

Personal information
- Full name: Ruud Jorge Boffin
- Date of birth: 5 November 1987 (age 39)
- Place of birth: Sint-Truiden, Belgium
- Height: 1.96 m (6 ft 5 in)
- Position: Goalkeeper

Youth career
- Genk
- 2005–2007: PSV

Senior career*
Years	Team	Apps	(Gls)
2007–2008	PSV	0	(0)
2007–2008	→ Eindhoven (loan)	20	(0)
2008–2010	MVV	61	(0)
2010	→ VVV-Venlo (loan)	5	(0)
2010–2012	West Ham United	1	(0)
2012–2017	Eskişehirspor	154	(1)
2017–2022	Antalyaspor	148	(0)
- * Club domestic league appearances and goals

Ruud Jorge Boffin (born 5 November 1987) is a Belgian former professional footballer who played as a goalkeeper.

== Career ==
=== Early career ===
Born in Sint-Truiden, Boffin began his career with the youth team of Racing Genk, before moving to Dutch team PSV in 2005. Boffin never made a senior appearance for PSV, and began his professional career on loan at FC Eindhoven during the 2007–08 season. Boffin moved to MVV Maastricht in 2008, and spent the second half of the 2009–10 season on loan at VVV-Venlo. Boffin made a total of 86 league appearances in Dutch football.

=== West Ham United ===
Boffin signed for English team West Ham United on 1 September 2010, on a two-year deal, alongside fellow new signing Lars Jacobsen. Boffin signed for an undisclosed nominal fee following a trial for the club, and was announced as cover for Robert Green. Boffin made his West Ham debut on 18 December 2010, in the 1–1 Premier League draw against Blackburn Rovers. In April 2012 having found his playing opportunities infrequent due to the form of Robert Green and the signing of Stephen Henderson, Boffin's contract was cancelled by mutual consent. Boffin made one League and two Cup appearances for West Ham.

=== Eskişehirspor ===
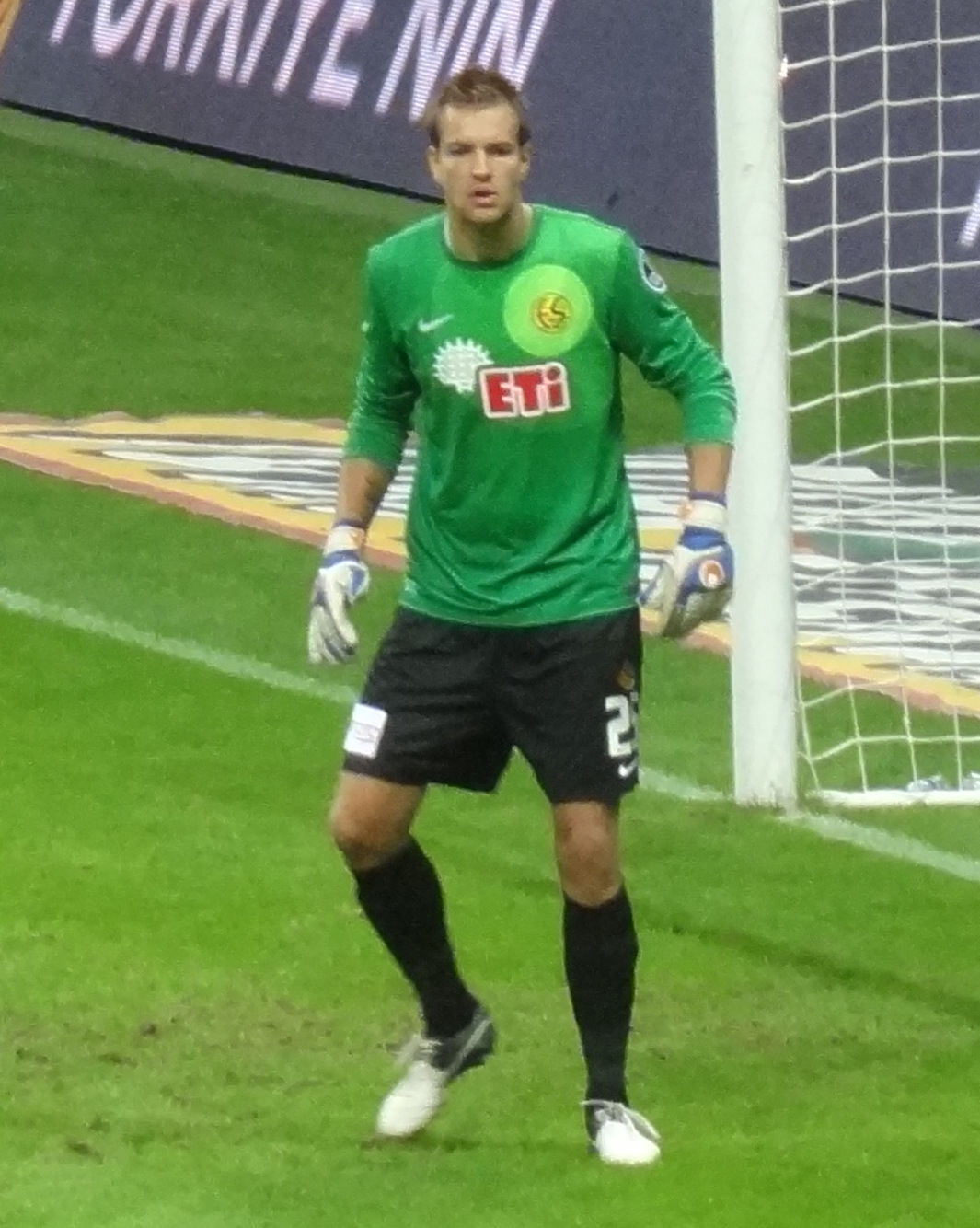
Boffin with Eskişehirspor in 2012.

In May 2012, he signed for Turkish club Eskişehirspor. On 25 September 2016, he scored a goal by a direct free-kick from his own half at TFF First League game against Ümraniyespor, which ended 2–0.

=== Antalyaspor ===
After having played in the second-tier TFF First League with Eskişehirspor, Boffin signed with Süper Lig club Antalyaspor in 2017. In his first season, he had to share his playing time with Ferhat Kaplan, but he soon grew into the starter. In 2021, he reached the final of the Turkish Cup for the second time in his career.

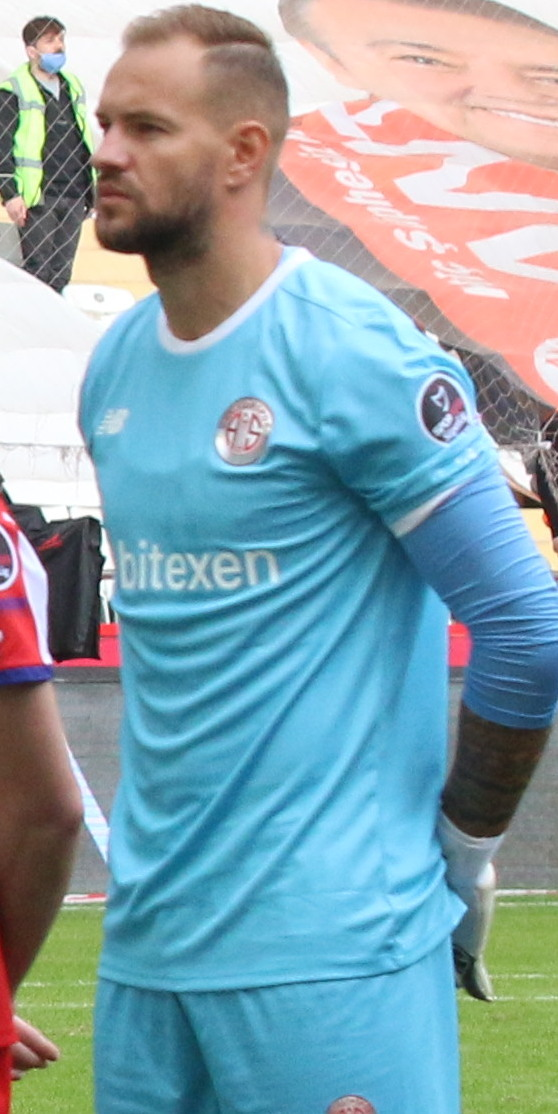
Boffin with Antalyaspor in 2021.
