= Sardari =

Sardari may refer to:

- Sardari, Iran, now called Sardrud
- Sardar Iravani, Sardār-e Īravānī, title of governor of Yerevan
- Abdol Hossein Sardari, Iranian diplomat, who saved Jews from the holocaust

== See also ==
- Sardar (disambiguation)
- Sardari Begum, a 1996 Indian Hindi-language film
