= HMS Sirdar =

HMS Sirdar is the name of the following ships of the Royal Navy:

- HMS Sirdar (1918), an Admiralty S destroyer
- HMS Sirdar (P226), an S-class submarine

== See also ==
- HMS Sirdar (fictional), a fictional ship in the novel The Guns of Navarone
- Sirdar (disambiguation)
