= Paul Mukairu =

Nigerian footballer

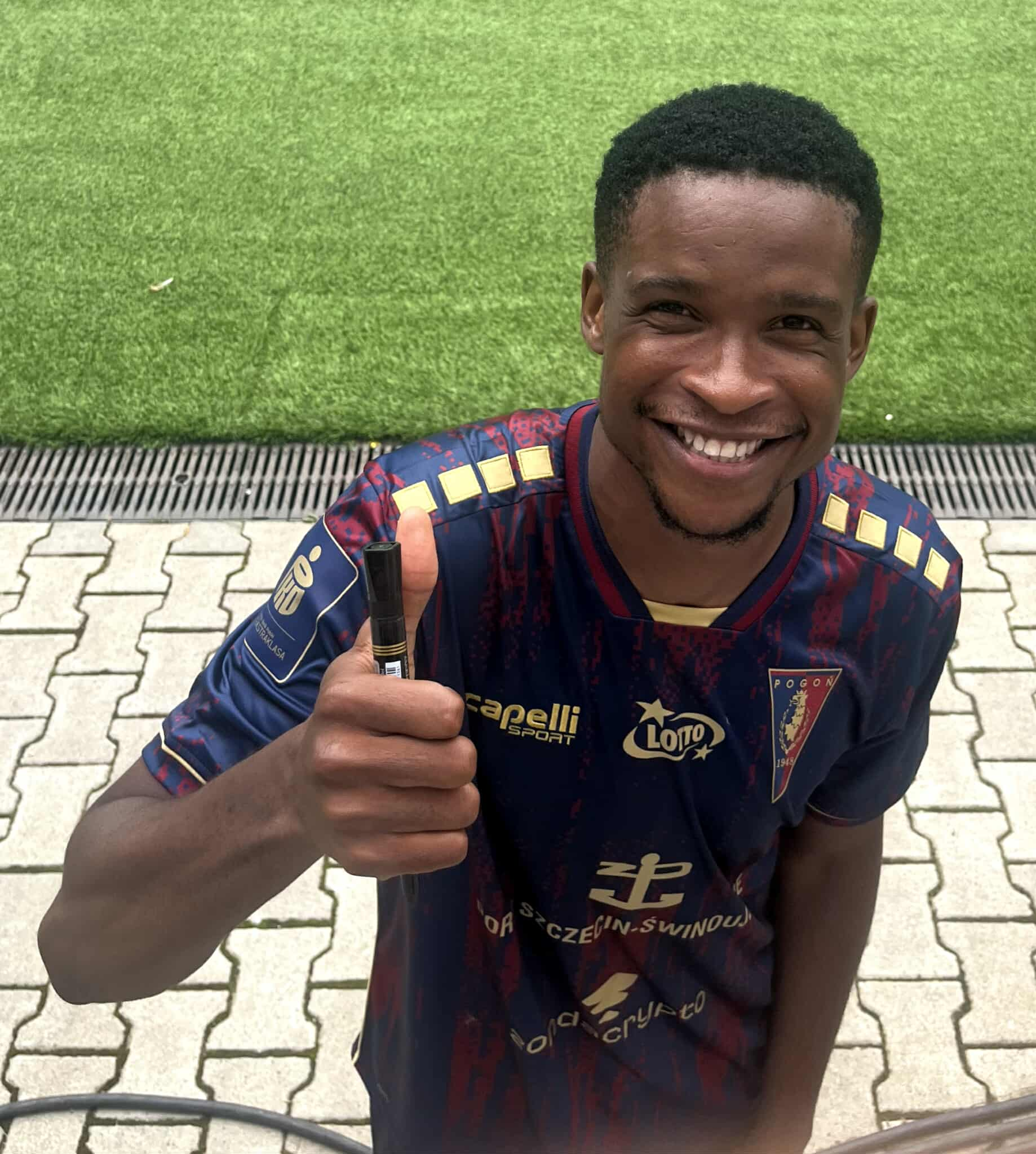
- Mukairu in 2025 with Pogoń Szczecin

Personal information
- Full name: Paul Omo Mukairu
- Date of birth: 18 January 2000 (age 26)
- Place of birth: Abuja, Nigeria
- Height: 1.82 m (6 ft 0 in)
- Position: Winger

Team information
- Current team: Pogoń Szczecin
- Number: 18

Youth career
- FC Hearts Academy
- 2019: Antalyaspor

Senior career*
Years	Team	Apps	(Gls)
2019–2022	Antalyaspor	44	(6)
2020–2021	→ Anderlecht (loan)	25	(2)
2022–2025	Copenhagen	20	(0)
2023–2024	→ Reading (loan)	31	(3)
2024–2025	→ Boluspor (loan)	34	(7)
2025–	Pogoń Szczecin	43	(10)
- * Club domestic league appearances and goals as of 21:35, 13 October 2026 (UTC)

Paul Omo Mukairu (born 18 January 2000) is a Nigerian professional footballer who plays as a winger for Polish club Pogoń Szczecin.

== Career ==
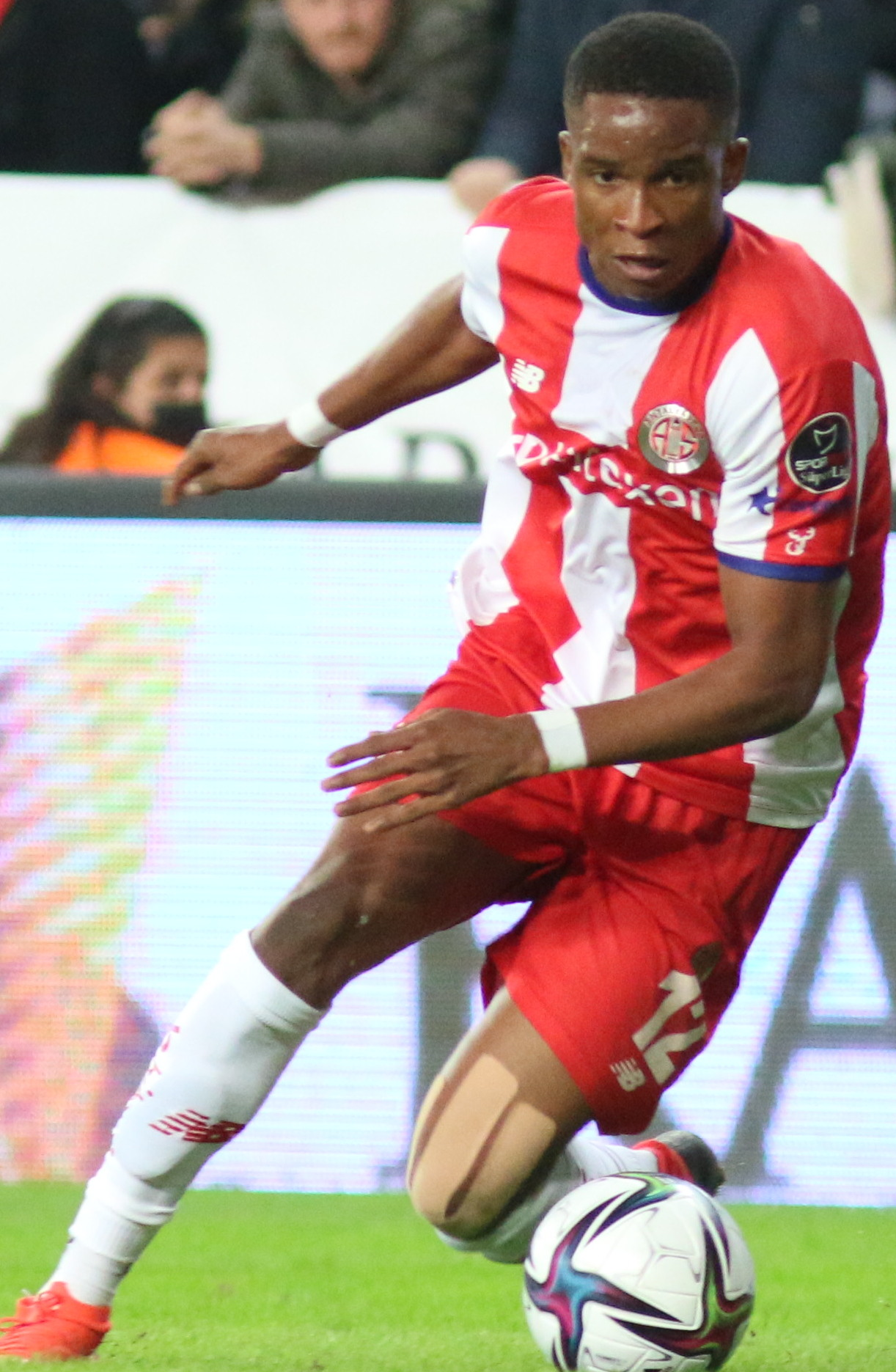
Mukairu with Antalyaspor in 2021

Mukairu is a youth product of the Nigerian FC Hearts Academy, and moved to the Turkish club Antalyaspor in 2019. He made his professional and Süper Lig debut with Antalyaspor in a 1–0 win over Göztepe S.K. on 18 August 2019. He moved to Anderlecht on loan in the Belgian First Division A for the 2020-21 season, before returning to Antalyaspor. After scoring 8 goals in 53 games in all competitions with Antalyaspor, he transferred to the Danish club F.C. Copenhagen on 27 January 2022 on a 3-year contract.

On 16 August 2023, Mukairu joined League One club Reading on a season-long loan deal.

In September 2024, Mukairu joined TFF First League club Boluspor on a season-long loan deal.

On 2 July 2025, Polish club Pogoń Szczecin announced the signing of Mukairu on a two-year deal, with an option for another year.

== Career statistics ==
As of match played 23 May 2026

Appearances and goals by club, season and competition
Club	Season	League			National cup (Note: Includes Turkish Cup, Belgian Cup, Danish Cup, FA Cup, Polish Cup)		League cup		Europe		Other		Total	
Club	Season	Division	Apps	Goals	Apps	Goals	Apps	Goals	Apps	Goals	Apps	Goals	Apps	Goals
Antalyaspor	2019–20	Süper Lig	24	3	7	1	—		—		—		31	4
Antalyaspor	2020–21	Süper Lig	3	0	0	0	—		—		—		3	0
Antalyaspor	2021–22	Süper Lig	17	3	1	1	—		—		1 (Note: Appearance in Turkish Super Cup)	0	19	4
Antalyaspor	Total		44	6	8	2	—		—		1	0	53	8
Anderlecht (loan)	2020–21	Belgian Pro League	25	2	4	2	—		—		—		29	4
Copenhagen	2021–22	Danish Superliga	15	0	0	0	—		0	0	—		15	0
Copenhagen	2022–23	Danish Superliga	5	0	1	0	—		4 (Note: Appearances in UEFA Champions League)	0	—		10	0
Copenhagen	2023–24	Danish Superliga	0	0	0	0	—		0	0	—		0	0
Copenhagen	Total		20	0	1	0	—		4	0	—		25	0
Reading (loan)	2023–24	EFL League One	31	3	2	0	0	0	—		5 (Note: Appearances in EFL Trophy)	3	38	6
Boluspor (loan)	2024–25	TFF 1. Lig	34	7	2	0	—		—		3 (Note: Appearances in TFF 1. Lig promotion play-offs)	0	39	7
Pogoń Szczecin	2025–26	Ekstraklasa	34	8	2	0	—		—		—		36	8
Career total			188	26	19	4	0	0	4	0	9	3	220	33

== Honours ==
Copenhagen

- Danish Superliga: 2021–22 2022–23
- Danish Cup: 2022–23
