= Sardar Patel Stadium, Mehsana =

Multi-purpose stadium in Mehsana, Gujarat, India

Sardar Patel Stadium
- Mehsana Cricket Stadium
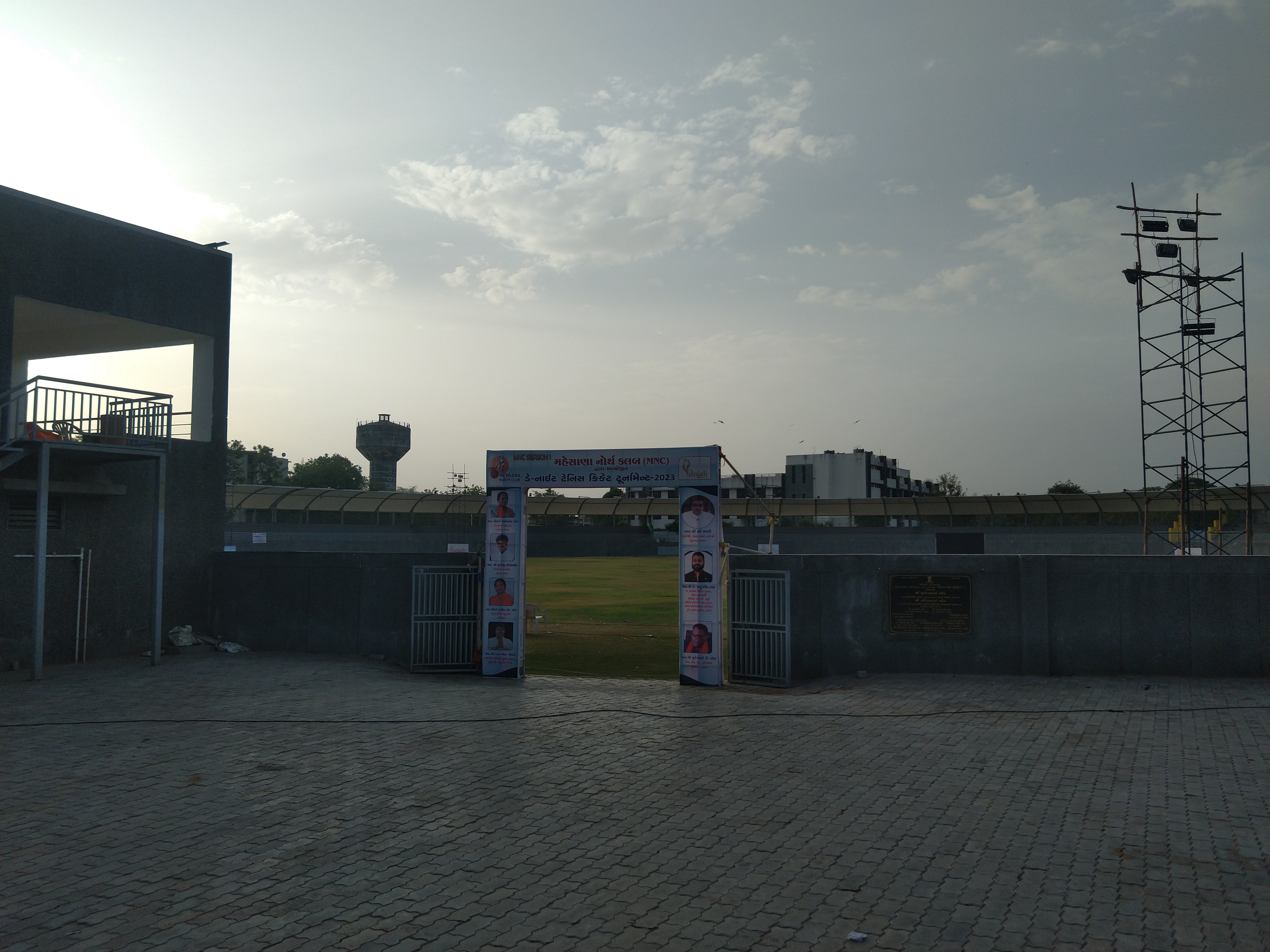
- Entrance to the stadium ground
- Interactive map of Sardar Patel Stadium
- Address: India
- Location: Municipal Ground, Mehsana, Gujarat, India
- Coordinates: 23.6061837°N 72.39420051°E
- Owner: Mehsana Municipality
- Capacity: 3000
- Type: Stadium
- Event: Multi-purpose
- Field size: 24,000 m^{2} (260,000 sq ft)

Construction
- Groundbreaking: 2019
- Opened: 19 October 2022
- Cost: ₹11 crore (US$1.1 million)

Sardar Patel Stadium is a multi-purpose stadium and sports complex at Municipal Ground, Mehsana, Gujarat, India. It was built at the total cost of ₹11 crore (US$1.1 million) and opened in October 2022.

== History ==
In 2019, the Mehsana Municipality announced the construction of the cricket stadium and sports complex at the cost of ₹9 crore (equivalent to ₹11 crore or US$1.2 million in 2023). Total ₹5 crore (US$520,000) was financed by the Government of Gujarat while rest of the ₹4 crore (US$420,000) was received from the Fourteenth Finance Commission. The floodlights of the stadium was originally proposed to cost additional ₹2 crore (US$210,000). The dimmer floodlight installation was proposed in 2022 to lower the costs. The stadium was near completion in 2021. It was officially named Sardar Patel Stadium. It was inaugurated on 19 October 2022 by Gujarat Chief Minister Bhupendrabhai Patel and former deputy chief minister Nitin Patel.

== Features ==
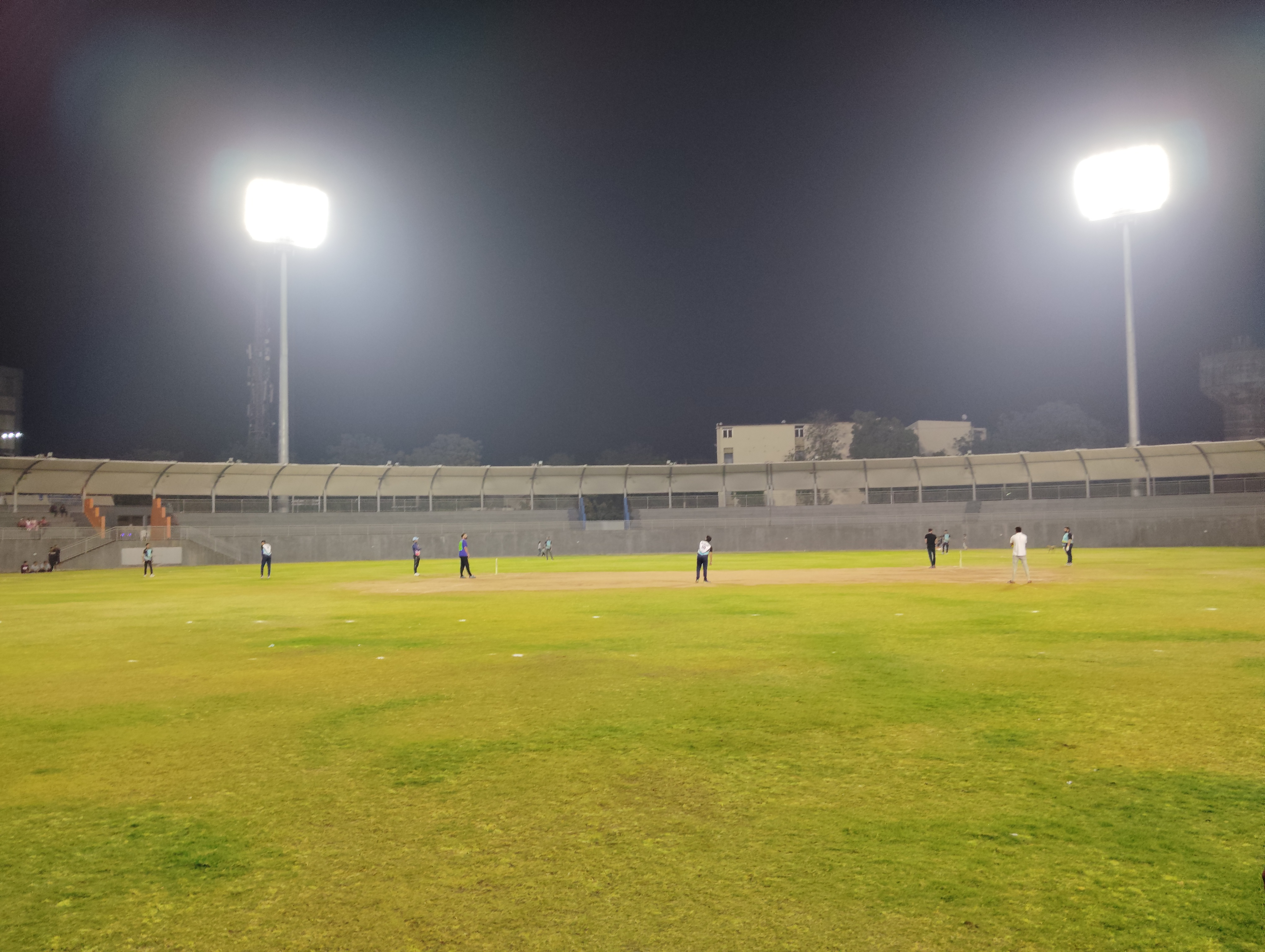
Stadium at night

The main stadium is spread over an area of 24,000 m^{2} (260,000 sq ft). It has seating capacity of 3000 people where cricket, hockey or football matches can be held. A basketball ground has seating capacity of 250 people where handball and volleyball matches can also be held. Two tennis courts with seating capacity of 250 people are constructed. It has a parking capacity of 250 cars and 1000 two-wheelers.

It is the first cricket stadium built in north Gujarat.

== See also ==
- Boter Kothani Vav
