= Sar Dar, Kerman =

Sar Dar سردر
- Village
- Location within Iran
- Coordinates: 30°37′00″N 57°00′00″E
- Country: Iran
- Province: Kerman
- County: Kerman
- Bakhsh: Chatrud
- Rural District: Moezziyeh

Population (2006)
  - Total: 250
- Time zone: UTC+3:30 (IRST)
  - Summer (DST): UTC+4:30 (IRDT)

Sar Dar (Persian: سردر) is a village located in Moezziyeh Rural District, Chatrud District, Kerman County, Kerman Province, Iran. According to the 2006 census, the village had a population of 350 people, residing in 72 families.
