= Serdar (surname) =

Serdar is a surname of the following notable people:

- Emerîkê Serdar (1935–2018), Kurdish-Yezidi writer from Armenia
- Iva Serdar (born 1982), Croatian basketball player
- Ivo Serdar (1933–1985), Croatian actor
- Lenka Serdar (born 1997), Czech-American ice hockey player
- Ovezmurat Dykma-Serdar (1825–1882), Turkmen tribal leader
- Suat Serdar (born 1997), German football midfielder
