= Sardar, Chaharmahal and Bakhtiari =

Sardar سردار
- Village
- Location within Iran
- Coordinates: 31°25′14″N 50°38′21″E
- Country: Iran
- Province: Chaharmahal and Bakhtiari
- County: Lordegan
- Bakhsh: Manj
- Rural District: Manj

Population (2006)
  - Total: 241
- Time zone: UTC+3:30 (IRST)
  - Summer (DST): UTC+4:30 (IRDT)

Sardar (Persian: سردار, also Romanized as Sardār) is a village in Manj Rural District, Manj District, Lordegan County, Chaharmahal and Bakhtiari Province, Iran. At the 2006 census, its population was 241, in 42 families. The village is populated by Lurs.
