= Salar Azimi =

Iranian businessman

Salar Azimi (Persian: سالار عظیمی; born 21 September 1982) is an Iranian who fled to the Netherlands when he was 13 years old. There he became a businessman and a millionaire.

== Business ==
When Azimi came to the Netherlands, he first lived with his parents and brother Sasan in a small room in an asylum seekers' center for a few years. He then went to school in Zeelandic Flanders. After graduating he built up a diverse business empire together with Sasan: telephone company Trendy Telecom, computer company Trendy Computers, later also a hotel, a party boat and his own Belgian football club: K. Patro Eisden Maasmechelen. Together they became multimillionaires.

Azimi is married with Annika de Ruijsscher. They have two daughters: Princess and Isabella. They live in the Elderschans castle in Aardenburg. He also owns several expensive and exclusive cars.

Azimi featured in several Belgian and Dutch television programs, including Belgian program The Sky is the Limit and Dutch program Waar doen ze het van? and in talk show Jinek.
