= Sirdar-e Bala =

Sirdar-e Bala سيردربالا
- Village
- Location within Iran
- Coordinates: 33°42′54″N 47°33′29″E
- Country: Iran
- Province: Lorestan
- County: Kuhdasht
- Bakhsh: Central
- Rural District: Kuhdasht-e Shomali

Population (2006)
  - Total: 114
- Time zone: UTC+3:30 (IRST)
  - Summer (DST): UTC+4:30 (IRDT)

Sirdar-e Bala (Persian: سيردربالا, also Romanized as Sīrdar-e Bālā; also known as Sīrdar) is a village in Kuhdasht-e Shomali Rural District, in the Central District of Kuhdasht County, Lorestan Province, Iran. At the 2006 census, its population was 114, in 18 families.
