= Bahadır Öztürk =

Turkish footballer

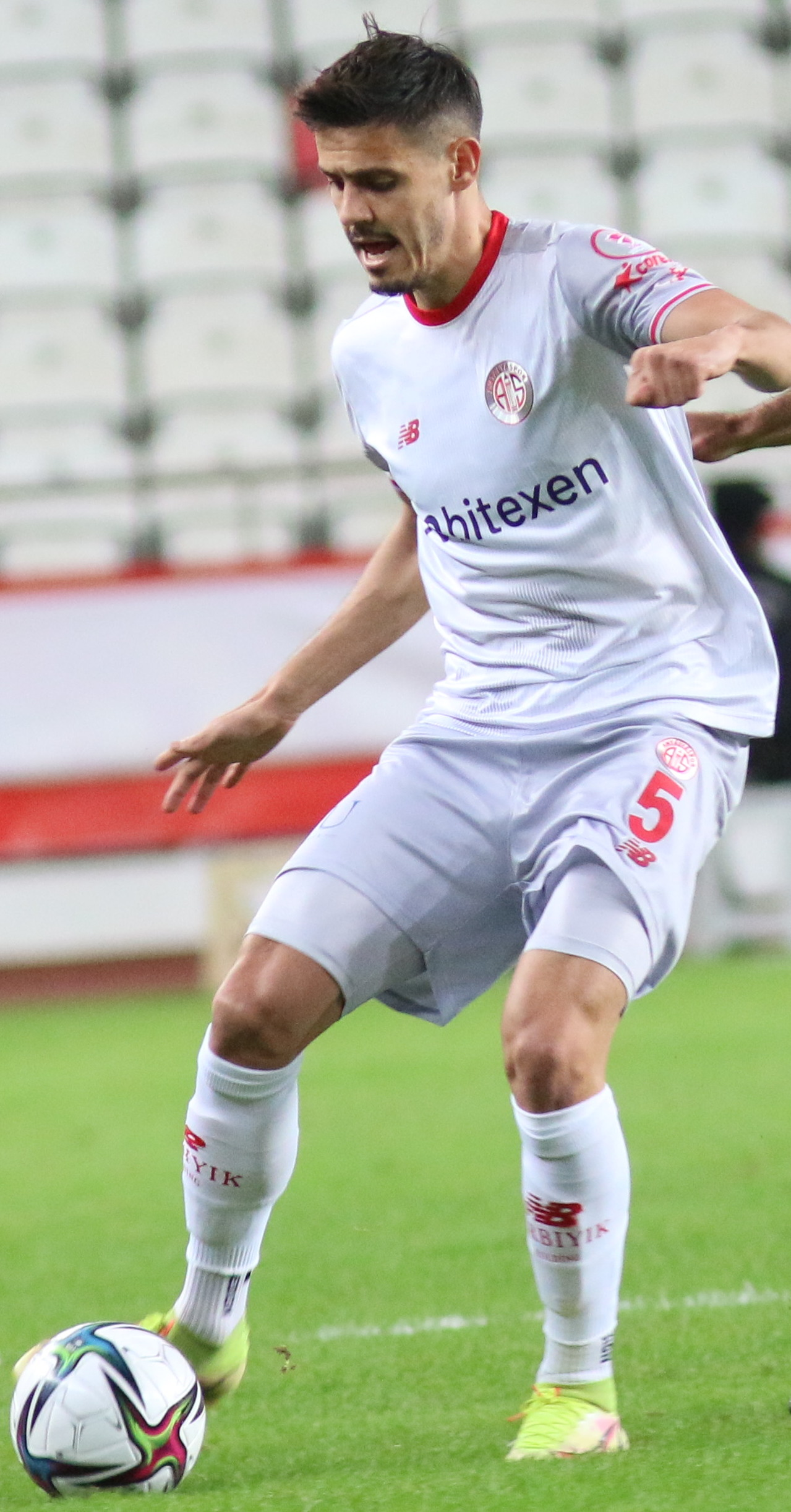

Personal information
- Full name: Bahadır Öztürk
- Date of birth: 1 October 1995 (age 31)
- Place of birth: Gaziosmanpaşa, Turkey
- Height: 1.85 m (6 ft 1 in)
- Position: Defender

Team information
- Current team: Esenler Erokspor
- Number: 21

Youth career
- 2012–2015: Antalyaspor

Senior career*
Years	Team	Apps	(Gls)
2015–2026	Antalyaspor	81	(1)
2015–2016	→ Elazığspor (loan)	3	(0)
2016–2017	→ BB Bodrumspor (loan)	6	(0)
2017	→ Kırklarelispor (loan)	16	(1)
2017–2018	→ Şanlıurfaspor (loan)	30	(0)
2022–2023	→ Çaykur Rizespor (loan)	28	(0)
2026–	Esenler Erokspor	9	(0)
- * Club domestic league appearances and goals as of 19 October 2026

Bahadır Öztürk (born 1 October 1995) is a Turkish footballer who plays as a defender for Turkish TFF 1. Lig club Esenler Erokspor.

== Career ==
A youth product of Antalyaspor, Öztürk spent his early career on loan with various clubs in the lower divisions of Turkey. Öztürk made his professional debut for Antalyaspor in a 3-2 Süper Lig win over Beşiktaş JK on 26 August 2018.
