= Sirdar-e Pain =

Sirdar-e Pain سيردرپائين
- Village
- Location within Iran
- Coordinates: 33°43′22″N 47°32′53″E
- Country: Iran
- Province: Lorestan
- County: Kuhdasht
- Bakhsh: Central
- Rural District: Kuhdasht-e Shomali

Population (2006)
  - Total: 64
- Time zone: UTC+3:30 (IRST)
  - Summer (DST): UTC+4:30 (IRDT)

Sirdar-e Pain (Persian: سيردرپائين, also Romanized as Sīrdar-e Pā’īn; also known as Sīrdar) is a village in Kuhdasht-e Shomali Rural District, in the Central District of Kuhdasht County, Lorestan Province, Iran. At the 2006 census, its population was 64, in 10 families.
