= Ufuk Akyol =

German footballer

Personal information
- Full name: Ufuk Akyol
- Date of birth: 27 August 1997 (age 29)
- Place of birth: Ravensburg, Germany
- Height: 1.80 m (5 ft 11 in)
- Position: Midfielder

Team information
- Current team: Antalyaspor
- Number: 16

Youth career
- 2012–2015: Stuttgart
- 2015–2016: Heidenheim

Senior career*
Years	Team	Apps	(Gls)
2016–2019	Fatih Karagümrük	73	(9)
2019–2024	Antalyaspor	98	(3)
2024–2026	Konyaspor	7	(0)
2025	→ Esenler Erokspor (loan)	7	(1)
2026–	Antalyaspor	0	(0)

International career^{‡}
2012–2013	Germany U16	8	(1)
2013	Germany U17	1	(0)
- * Club domestic league appearances and goals as of 18 October 2026 ‡ National team caps and goals as of 21 October 2018

Ufuk Akyol (born 27 August 1997) is a German professional footballer who plays as a midfielder for Turkish TFF 1. Lig club Antalyaspor.

== Career ==
Akyol is a youth product of the academies of the German clubs Stuttgart and Heidenheim. He moved to the Turkish club Fatih Karagümrük on 22 April 2016, signing a professional contract. He made his professional debut in a 1-0 Süper Lig win over Göztepe S.K. on 18 August 2019. On 13 May 2019, he transferred to Antalyaspor after 3 seasons with Fatih Karagümrük.

== International career ==
Born in Germany, Akyol is of Turkish descent. He is a youth international for Germany, having played for the Germany U16s and Germany U17s. He has expressed an interest in playing for the Turkey national team.
