= Mikail Başar =

Turkish footballer (born 2001)

Personal information
- Date of birth: 20 June 2001 (age 25)
- Place of birth: Antalya, Turkey
- Height: 1.78 m (5 ft 10 in)
- Position: Forward

Youth career
- 2013: Meydan Gençlikspor
- 2013–2020: Antalyaspor

Senior career*
Years	Team	Apps	(Gls)
2020–2021	Antalyaspor	0	(0)
2020–2021	→ Bodrumspor (loan)	10	(0)
2021	→ Serik Belediyespor (loan)	11	(0)
2022–2023	Serik Belediyespor	2	(0)
- * Club domestic league appearances and goals as of 20 May 2023

Mikail Başar (born 20 June 2001) is a Turkish footballer who plays as a forward.

== Career ==
Başar made his professional debut with Antalyaspor in a 4-3 Turkish Cup win over Göztepe on 16 January 2020.
