= Serdar Özkan =

Turkish footballer

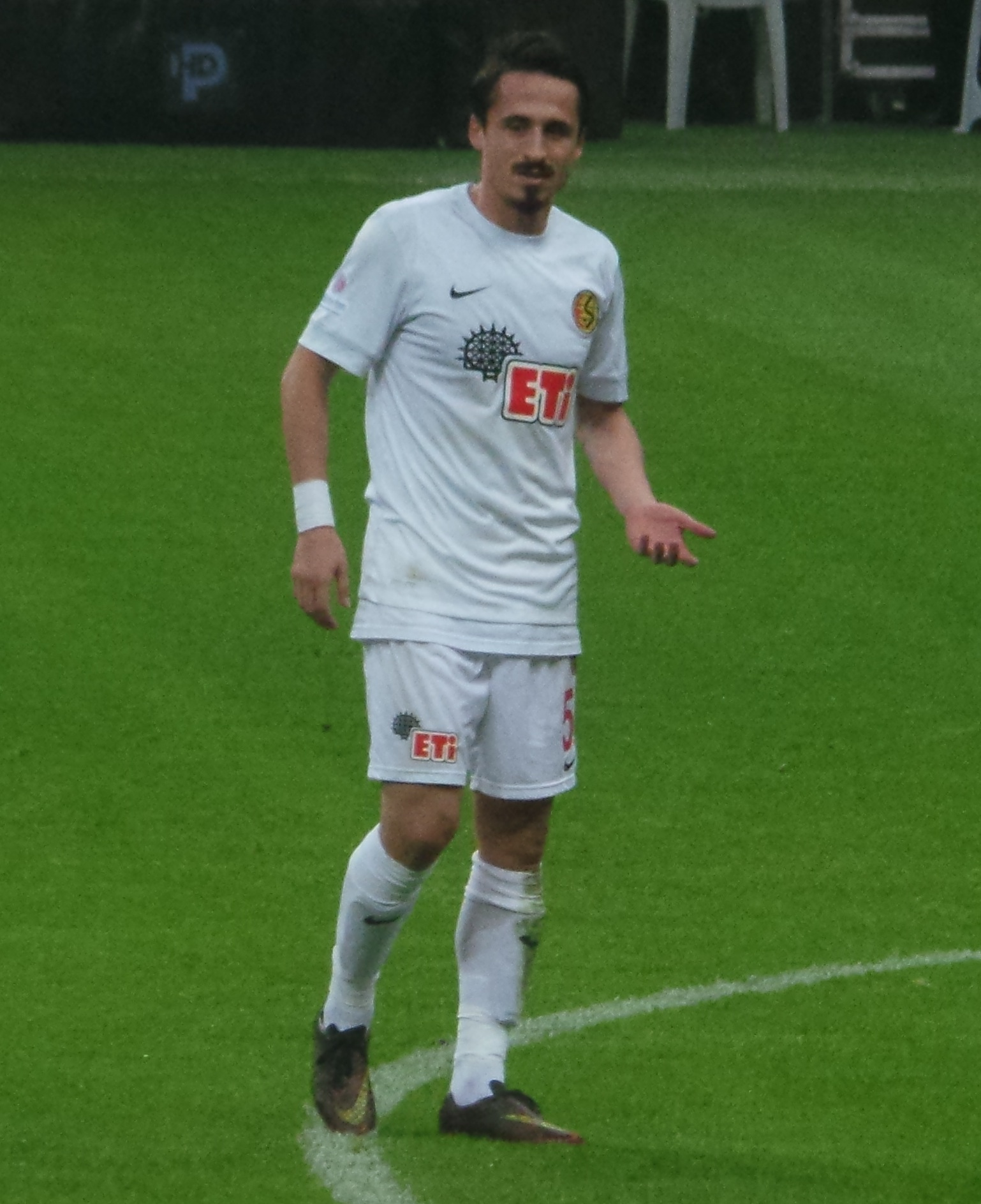

Personal information
- Date of birth: 1 January 1987 (age 39)
- Place of birth: Düzce, Turkey
- Height: 1.72 m (5 ft 8 in)
- Positions: Winger; attacking midfielder

Youth career
- 1999–2005: Beşiktaş

Senior career*
Years	Team	Apps	(Gls)
2002–2010	Beşiktaş	83	(4)
2005	→ İstanbulspor (loan)	0	(0)
2005–2006	→ Akçaabat Sebatspor (loan)	31	(4)
2006–2007	→ Samsunspor (loan)	18	(0)
2010–2011	Galatasaray	2	(0)
2011–2012	Ankaragücü	20	(3)
2012	Samsunspor	13	(0)
2012–2013	Şanlıurfaspor	25	(5)
2013–2014	Elazığspor	26	(6)
2014–2015	Sivasspor	0	(0)
2015	Eskişehirspor	22	(0)
2015–2017	Antalyaspor	49	(0)
2017–2018	Gençlerbirliği	10	(2)
2018–2019	Antalyaspor	35	(5)
2020	Bursaspor	10	(1)
2021	Adanaspor	14	(2)

International career
2002	Turkey U16	10	(6)
2002–2004	Turkey U17	27	(5)
2003–2005	Turkey U18	10	(0)
2006	Turkey U19	10	(5)
2007–2008	Turkey U21	8	(1)
2007–2008	Turkey	3	(0)
- * Club domestic league appearances and goals as of 16 December 2021

Serdar Özkan (born 1 January 1987) is a Turkish professional footballer who plays as a winger.

== Career statistics ==
Club	Season	League		Cup		League Cup		Europe		Total	
Club	Season	Apps	Goals	Apps	Goals	Apps	Goals	Apps	Goals	Apps	Goals
Beşiktaş	2003–04	2	0	1	0	-	-	-	-	3	0
Beşiktaş	2004–05	2	0	1	0	-	-	-	-	3	0
Beşiktaş	Total	4	0	2	0	0	0	0	0	6	0
İstanbulspor (loan)	2004–05	0	0	0	0	-	-	-	-	0	0
Akçaabat Sebatspor (loan)	2005–06	31	4	1	0	-	-	-	-	32	4
Samsunspor (loan)	2006–07	12	0	0	0	-	-	-	-	12	0
Beşiktaş	2007–08	30	3	3	0	-	-	10	0	43	3
Beşiktaş	2008–09	25	1	6	2	-	-	3	1	34	4
Beşiktaş	2009–10	12	0	3	0	-	-	3	0	15	0
Beşiktaş	Total	67	4	12	2	0	0	16	1	95	7
Galatasaray	2010–11	2	0	1	0	-	-	4	0	7	0
MKE Ankaragücü	2010–11	8	2	1	0	-	-	-	-	9	2
MKE Ankaragücü	2011–12	12	1	0	0	-	-	-	-	12	1
MKE Ankaragücü	Total	20	3	1	0	0	0	0	0	21	3
Samsunspor	2011–12	13	0	2	0	-	-	-	-	15	0
Şanlıurfaspor	2012–13	25	5	1	0	-	-	-	-	26	5
Elazığspor	2013–14	26	6	6	1	-	-	-	-	32	7
Eskişehirspor	2014–15	22	0	7	2	-	-	-	-	29	2
Antalyaspor	2015–16	30	0	7	1	-	-	-	-	37	1
Antalyaspor	2016–17	19	0	0	0	-	-	-	-	19	0
Antalyaspor	Total	49	0	7	1	-	-	-	-	56	1
Gençlerbirliği	2017–18	10	2	1	0	-	-	-	-	11	2
Antalyaspor	2018–19	21	2	2	0	-	-	-	-	23	2
Career total		302	26	43	6	0	0	20	1	365	33

As of 29 April 2019
