= Ferhat Kaplan =

Turkish footballer (born 1989)

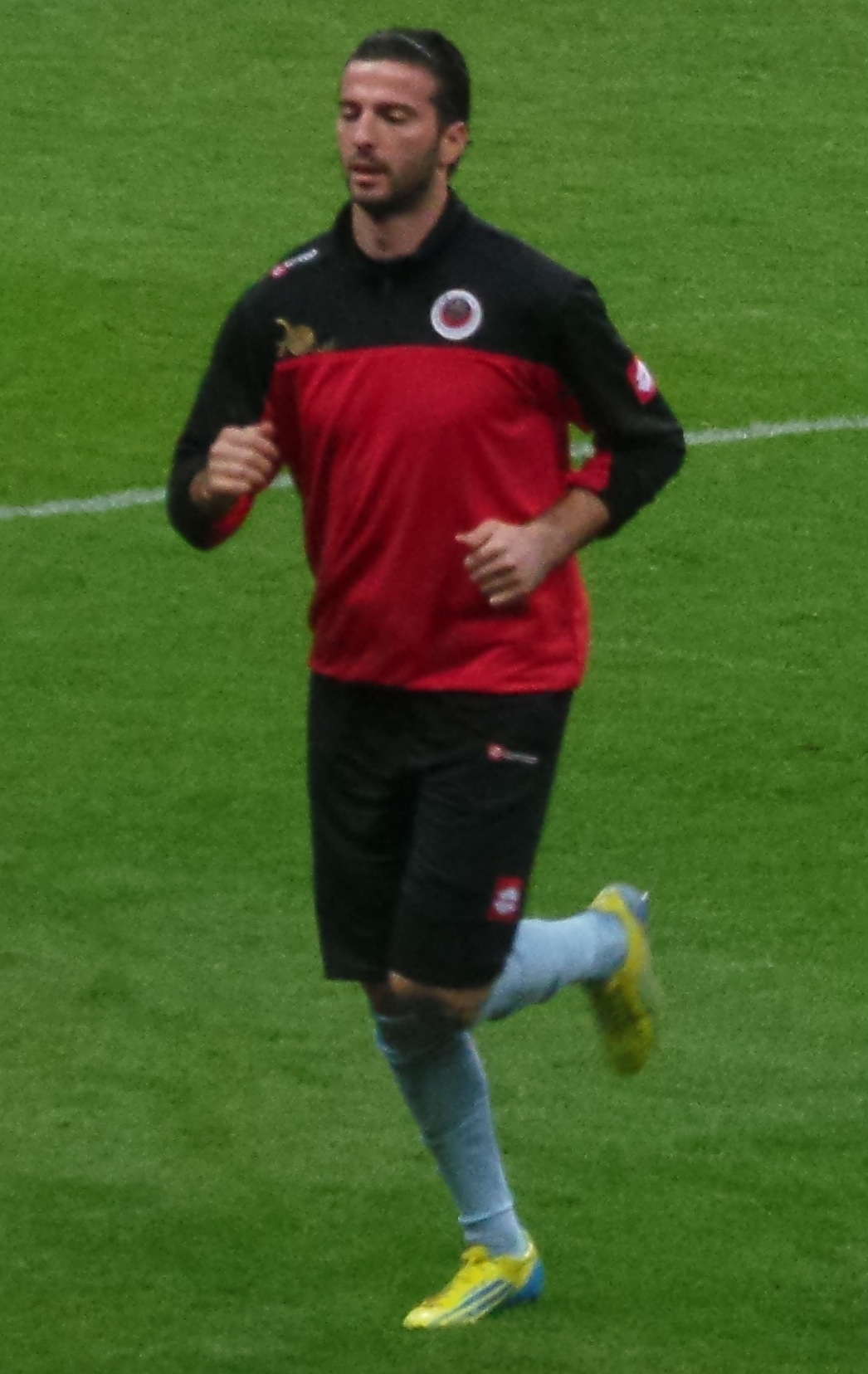

Personal information
- Full name: Ferhat Kaplan
- Date of birth: 7 January 1989 (age 37)
- Place of birth: İzmir, Turkey
- Height: 1.89 m (6 ft 2 in)
- Position: Goalkeeper

Youth career
- 2000–2005: Metaspor
- 2005–2006: Dardanelspor

Senior career*
Years	Team	Apps	(Gls)
2006–2011	Dardanelspor	99	(0)
2011–2016	Gençlerbirliği	21	(0)
2016–2021	Antalyaspor	50	(0)
2021–2022	Adana Demirspor	7	(0)
2022–2023	Giresunspor	13	(0)
2023–2024	Tuzlaspor	12	(0)
2024	Adanaspor	10	(0)
2024–2025	Batman Petrolspor	15	(0)

International career
2007	Turkey U18	12	(0)
2007–2008	Turkey U19	5	(0)
2008	Turkey U20	1	(0)
- * Club domestic league appearances and goals as of 3 May 2025

Ferhat Kaplan (born 7 January 1989) is a Turkish professional footballer who plays as a goalkeeper.

== Career ==
Kaplan began his career at the Metaspor football school in 2000. He was transferred to Dardanelspor in 2005, where he has played since.

Kaplan is also a youth international.

On 5 August 2022, Kaplan signed with Giresunspor.
