= 2024–25 Adana Demirspor season =

Adana Demirspor
2024–25 season
- Owner: Murat Sancak
- President: Bedirhan Durak
- Manager: Michael Valkanis (until 23 September 2024); Serkan Damla (caretaker, 23 September–27 November); Mustafa Dalcı (from 29 November); Mustafa Alper Avcı
- Stadium: New Adana Stadium
- Süper Lig: 19th
- Turkish Cup: Fifth round
- Average home league attendance: 5,173

The 2024–25 season is the 85th season in the history of Adana Demirspor, and the club's fourth consecutive season in Süper Lig. In addition to the domestic league, the team is scheduled to participate in the Turkish Cup.

== Season summary ==
=== Pre-season ===
Adana Demirspor, which concluded the 2023-24 season in 12th position in the Super League, terminated the contracts of numerous players and underwent notable changes to its squad due to the economic crisis that began at the conclusion of that season. The team faced significant challenges before the new season, with financial penalties from FIFA and UEFA due to unpaid debts emerging as a major obstacle.

Murat Sancak, who had stepped down from the presidency midway through the previous season, resumed his role prior to the start of the pre-season. An agreement was signed with Joma for the preparation of the jerseys. Michael Valkanis was hired as technical director.

=== Start of season ===
Adana Demirspor started the 2024-25 season with an away match against Fenerbahçe, which they lost 1-0. The most notable aspect of Adana Demirspor's performance in the match was the inclusion of 15-year-old goalkeeper Deniz Eren Dönmezer in the starting lineup. In the following three matches, the team only obtained one point in their away match against Kasımpaşa. They remained at the bottom of the league after the first four weeks prior to the national match break between 2 and 15 September 2024.

Another key issue was whether the requisite payments would be made to lift the transfer ban imposed on the club prior to the summer transfer board, which closed on 13 September 2024. Despite repeated calls from fans via social media, President Murat Sancak was unable to lift the ban and declared it to the public one day before the transfer period ended. As a result, the club started the new season without making any new transfers. Due to difficulties in making payments, some players (Milad Muhammedi, Edouard Michut) who were in the squad for the Fenerbahçe match in the first week left the team in other weeks. Consequently, until the interim transfer period at the end of the first half, Adana Demirspor began competing with a limited squad comprising primarily youth and loan players from previous seasons. Valkanis was able to get only 1 point in the first 6 weeks of the season and the club announced that they parted ways with Valkanis on 23 September.

Then Serkan Damla took over the role for the coach but he also showed a similar poor performance. While the team was in last place with 2 points after 12 weeks, Damla announced his resignation on 28 November 28 2024. On 29 November, an agreement has made with Mustafa Dalcı for the role of head coach. Although the team secured its first victories under Mustafa Dalcı, they parted ways after the match against Çaykur Rizespor on 26 January 2025. The team's fourth coach was Mustafa Alper Avcı in this season. He had previously worked in Manchester City's youth academy. Avcı coached the team until the end of the season, securing 1 win and 3 draws. After the last match, he announced that he would not be at the team next season.

Murat Sancak, who was blamed for the financial crisis behind the team's performance and was the focus of criticism, also stepped down as president on 6 October 2024, handing over the position to board member Bedirhan Durak. However, this departure did not prevent Sancak from facing criticism on social media, particularly on his X account.

In February, in a match against Galatasaray, Adana Demirspor left the field in protest after a disputed penalty decision, leading to a 3-0 forfeit and a three-point deduction. Club chairman Murat Sancak received a 30-day suspension and a fine of 500,000 TL. Club official Cihan Eliçicek was banned from the locker room and bench for three matches and fined 292,500 TL.

Due to fines imposed by the Turkish Football Federation (TFF) and FIFA during the season, the team's points were reduced to -2, and its relegation from the Super League was confirmed with 10 weeks of the season remaining. Adana Demirspor managed to avoid finishing the season with negative points, thanks to 4 points earned in the last two weeks. Following a series of sporting setbacks, including three wins, five draws and 28 losses, the team concluded the season with a mere two points, despite a deduction of 12 penalty points.

== Transfers ==
=== Out ===
Pos.	Player	Transferred to	Fee	Date	Source
DF	(Senegal) Pape Abou Cissé	(Qatar) Al-Shamal	End of contract	1 July 2024	
FW	(Italy) Mario Balotelli	(Italy) Genoa	End of contract	1 July 2024	
GK	(Azerbaijan) Shakhruddin Magomedaliyev	(Azerbaijan) Qarabağ FK	End of contract	1 July 2024	
DF	(Algeria) Youcef Atal	(Qatar) Al Sadd	End of contract	1 July 2024	
MF	(Colombia) Stiven Mendoza	(Mexico) Club León	End of contract	1 July 2024	
MF	(Turkey) Emre Akbaba	(Turkey) Eyüpspor		9 July 2024	
DF	(Iran) Milad Mohammadi	(Iran) Persepolis		19 August 2024	
MF	(France) Édouard Michut	(Netherlands) Fortuna Sittard	Released	21 August 2024	
FW	(Tunisia) Motez Nourani		Released	6 December 2024	

== Friendlies ==
=== Pre-season ===
The camp in Italy was canceled due to visa issues.

16 July 2024 Friendly	Adana Demirspor (Turkey)	2–2	(Azerbaijan) Sumqayit
	Barası 13' (pen.), 37'

22 July 2024 Friendly	Adana Demirspor (Turkey)	3–3	(Azerbaijan) Turan Tovuz	Bolu
	Barası; Gravillon; Michut

27 July 2024 Friendly	Bodrum (Turkey)	2–3	(Turkey) Adana Demirspor
16:00 UTC+3

28 July 2024 Friendly	Napoli (Italy)	v	(Turkey) Adana Demirspor	Castel di Sangro, Italy
20:00				Stadium: Stadio Teofilo Patini

31 July 2024 Friendly	Bari (Italy)	v	(Turkey) Adana Demirspor	Bari, Italy
				Stadium: Stadio San Nicola

== Competitions ==
=== Overall record ===
Competition	First match	Last match	Starting round	Final position	Record							
Competition	First match	Last match	Starting round	Final position	Pld	W	D	L	GF	GA	GD	Win %
Süper Lig	10 August 2024	1 June 2025	Matchday 1		15	1	2	12	12	35	−23	6.67
Turkish Cup	3 December 2024	19 December 2024	Fourth round	Fifth round	2	1	0	1	4	5	−1	50.00
Total					17	2	2	13	16	40	−24	11.76

Last updated: 19 December 2024
Source: Competitions

=== Süper Lig ===
==== League table ====
Pos	Team	Pld	W	D	L	GF	GA	GD	Pts	Qualification or relegation
15	Antalyaspor	36	12	8	16	37	62	−25	44	
16	Bodrum (R)	36	9	10	17	26	43	−17	37	Relegation to 2025–26 TFF First League
17	Sivasspor (R)	36	9	8	19	44	60	−16	35	Relegation to 2025–26 TFF First League
18	Hatayspor (R)	36	6	8	22	47	74	−27	26	Relegation to 2025–26 TFF First League
19	Adana Demirspor (R)	36	3	5	28	34	92	−58	2 (Note: Adana Demirspor had 12 points deducted.)	Relegation to 2025–26 TFF First League

Source: Süper Lig
Rules for classification: 1) Points; 2) Head-to-head points; 3) Head-to-head goal difference; 4) Head-to-head goals scored; 5) Goal difference; 6) Goals scored; 7) Play-off.
(Note: Head-to-head record is used only after all the matches between the teams in question have been played)
(R) Relegated

==== Results summary ====
Overall								Home						Away					
Pld	W	D	L	GF	GA	GD	Pts	W	D	L	GF	GA	GD	W	D	L	GF	GA	GD
23	2	3	18	21	54	−33	6	1	1	10	11	30	−19	1	2	8	10	24	−14

Last updated: 16 December 2024.
Source: Süper Lig

==== Results by round ====
Round	1	2	3	4	5	6	7	8	9	10	11	12	13	14	15	16	17	18	19	20	21	22	23	24
Ground	A	H	A	H	A	H	A	A	B	H	A	H	A	H	A	H	A	H	A	H	A	H	A	H
Result	L	L	D	L	L	L	L	L	B	L	D	L	L	L	L	W	W	L	L	L	L	L	L	D
Position	17	18	19	19	19	19	19	19	19	19	19	19	19	19	19	19	19	19	19	19	19	19	19	19

Updated to match(es) played on 12 January 2025. Source: Süper Lig
A = Away; H = Home; B = Bye; W = Win; D = Draw; L = Loss

==== Matches ====
The match schedule was released on 11 July 2024.

10 August 2024 1	Fenerbahçe	1–0	Adana Demirspor	Istanbul
16:45 (UTC-3)	Oosterwolde (yellow card) 27' Džeko 34' Elmaz (yellow card) 90'	Report	Maestro (yellow card) 16'; Mohammadi (yellow card) 40'	Stadium: Şükrü Saracoğlu Stadium; Attendance: 37,932; Referee: Atilla Karaoğlan

17 August 2024 2	Adana Demirspor	1–2	Rizespor	Adana
16:45 (UTC-3)	Sarı (yellow card) 53'; Güler (yellow card) 90+4'; Barası 90+8' (pen.)	Report	Aliqulov 41' Sowe 74'	Stadium: New Adana Stadium; Attendance: 6,345; Referee: Cihan Aydın

25 August 2024 3	Kasımpaşa	2–2	Adana Demirspor	Kasımpaşa
14:15 (UTC-3)	Hajradinović 30' Gül (yellow card) 57'	Report	Barası (penalty missed) 13', 65'; Manev 90+3'	Stadium: Recep Tayyip Erdoğan Stadium; Attendance: 2,042; Referee: Abdullah Buğra Taşkınsoy

31 August 2024 4	Adana Demirspor	1–5	Galatasaray	Adana
16:45 (UTC-3)	Burak (yellow card) 19' Aydoğan (yellow card) 40' Kol (yellow card) 50' Sarı (penalty missed) 66' Gravillon 79' (pen.) Kalender (red card) 90'	Report	Aktürkoğlu 9' Güler 17' (o.g.) Yılmaz 31' Mertens 37' Bardakcı 60' Batshuayi (penalty missed) 90+1'	Stadium: New Adana Stadium; Attendance: 13,545; Referee: Kadir Sağlam

16 September 2024 5	Antalyaspor	2–1	Adana Demispor	Antalya
15:00 (UTC-3)	Kałuziński (yellow card) 27' Larsson 50' Samudio 90+8'	Report	Manev (yellow card) 79' Kavrazlı 84' Aktaş (yellow card) 90+10'	Stadium: Antalya Stadium; Attendance: 6,375; Referee: Yasin Kol

22 September 2024 6	Adana Demispor	0–2	Alanyaspor	Adana
15:00 (UTC-3)	Manev (yellow card) 49'	Report	Hwang 4', 17', (yellow card) 45+3' Augusto (yellow card) 34' Christian (yellow card) 90+3'	Stadium: New Adana Stadium; Attendance: 4,041; Referee: Emre Kargın

29 September 2024 7	Bodrum	3–1	Adana Demispor	Bodrum
14:00 (UTC-3)	Pușcaș 13', 82' Seferi 54', (penalty missed) 81' Ajeti (yellow card) 58' Brazão (yellow card) 61'	Report	Kurtulan (yellow card) 50' Güler (yellow card) 58' Gravillon 60' Nourani (yellow card) 73' Karakuş (yellow card) 80' Manev (yellow card) 90+9'	Stadium: Bodrum District Stadium; Attendance: 2,184; Referee: Turgut Doman

6 October 2024 8	Adana Demispor	1–3	Samsunspor	Adana
14:00 (UTC-3)	Barası 7' (pen.) Kavrazlı (yellow card) 14' Aymbetov (yellow card) 78' Burak (yellow card) 90'	Report	Šatka (yellow card) 25' Yavru (yellow card) 37' van Drongelen (yellow card) 39' Muja 58' Dimata 90+3' Aydoğdu 90+10'	Stadium: New Adana Stadium; Attendance: 6,637; Referee: Alper Akarsu

9	Bye

25 October 2024 10	Adana Demispor	2–4	Sivasspor	Adana
14:00 (UTC-3)	Barası 13' Güler 16' Aydoğan (yellow card) 37'	Report	Charisis (yellow card) 30' Turgunboev (yellow card) 36' Koita 38' Rodrigues 61' Manaj 66' Radaković 89' Biegański (yellow card) 90'	Stadium: New Adana Stadium; Attendance: 5,001; Referee: Atilla Karaoğlan

2 November 2024 11	Kayserispor	0–0	Adana Demispor	Kayseri
11:00 (UTC-3)	Yılmaz (yellow card) 36' Attamah (yellow card) 44' Bourabia (yellow card) 74' Bayazıt (yellow card) 90'	Report	Burak (yellow card) 8' Shehu (yellow card) 77' Kol (yellow card) 90+4'	Stadium: Kadir Has Stadium; Attendance: 5,466; Referee: Muhammet Ali Metoğlu

9 November 2024 12	Adana Demispor	0–1	Eyüpspor	Adana
13:00 (UTC-3)	Burak (yellow card) 37' Güler (yellow card) 44'	Report	Kutucu 9' Yalçın (yellow card) 39' İlter (yellow card) 65' Akbunar (yellow card) 86'	Stadium: New Adana Stadium; Attendance: 4,864; Referee: Direnç Tonusluoğlu

25 November 2024 13	Trabzonspor	5–0	Adana Demispor	Trabzon
14:00 (UTC-3)	Saračević 3', 78', 84' Türkmen (yellow card) 22' Banza 50', 54'	Report	Maestro (yellow card) 30' Karakuş (yellow card) 80'	Stadium: Şenol Güneş Sports Complex; Attendance: 7,763; Referee: Mehmet Türkmen

30 November 2024 14	Adana Demispor	0–1	Konyaspor	Adana
10:00 (UTC-3)	Burak (yellow card) 9' Güler (yellow card) 90+6' Çelik (yellow card) 90+6'	Report	Boranijašević (yellow card) 29' Jevtović 78' Aleksić (yellow card) 90+1' Słowik (yellow card) 90+3'	Stadium: New Adana Stadium; Attendance: 2,975; Referee: Atilla Karaoğlan

7 December 2024 15	Göztepe	3–1	Adana Demispor	Konak, İzmir
10:00 (UTC-3)	Bayrak (yellow card) 5' (yellow-red card) 76' Juan 39' Rômulo 42' Tijanić 59'	Report	Aydoğan (yellow card) 45+2' Aymbetov 87'	Stadium: Gürsel Aksel Stadium; Attendance: 13,471; Referee: Ali Şansalan

16 December 2024 16	Adana Demispor	2–1	Beşiktaş	Adana
13:00 (UTC-3)	Barası 31' Aymbetov 39' Maestro (yellow card) 57' Çelik (yellow card) 70' Aydoğan (yellow card) 90+3'	Report	Topçu (yellow card) 17' Al-Musrati 72' Sanuç (red card) 76' Słowik (yellow card) 90+3'	Stadium: New Adana Stadium; Attendance: 10,280; Referee: Oğuzhan Çakır

23 December 2024 17	Hatayspor	1–3	Adana Demispor	Mersin
14:00 (UTC-3)	Calvo (yellow card) 7' Yılmaz (yellow card) 15' Aboubakar 26' Sağlam (yellow card) 32' Demir (red card) 53' Fernandes (yellow card) 63' Bamgboye (yellow card) 79'	Report	Burak (yellow card) 56' Güler 61' Demirbağ 70' Aymbetov 75', (yellow card) 76' Ersoy (yellow card) 90+6'	Stadium: Mersin Stadium; Attendance: 1,755; Referee: Direnç Tonusluoğlu

4 January 2025 18	Adana Demispor	0–1	Başakşehir	Adana
1:30 (UTC-3)		Report	Crespo (yellow card) 19' Opoku (yellow card) 22' Davidson 32' Kemen (yellow card) 45+2' Özdemir (yellow card) 73' Şengezer (yellow card) 90+7'	Stadium: New Adana Stadium; Attendance: 4,899; Referee: Erkan Özdamar

12 January 2025 19	Gaziantep	1–0	Adana Demispor	Şehitkamil, Gaziantep
13:00 (UTC-3)	Okereke 4'; Maxim (yellow card) 43'; Kızıldağ (yellow card) 61'; Eskihellaç (yellow card) 68'; Bozan (yellow card) 85'	Report	Çelik (yellow card) 90+7'	Stadium: Gaziantep Stadium; Attendance: 5,345; Referee: Ozan Ergün

19 January 2025 20	Adana Demispor	0–4	Fenerbahçe	Adana
13:00 (UTC-3)	Çelik (yellow card) 34'; Barasi (red card) 56'	Report	Djiku (yellow card) 31'; En-Nesyri 69', 71'; Džeko 74'; Tosun 90+1'	Stadium: New Adana Stadium; Attendance: 14,165; Referee: Halil Umut Meler

19 January 2025 21	Çaykur Rizespor	3–2	Adana Demispor	Rize
1:30 (UTC-3)	Papanikolaou (yellow card) 24'; Olawoyin 30'; Sowe 47'; Aliqulov (yellow card) 58'; Ghezzal 69' (pen.); Şahin 83'; Højerl (yellow card) 90'; Jurečka (penalty missed) 90+4'	Report	Balat 52'; Güler (yellow card) 70'; Maestro (yellow card) 70', (goal) 83'; Dönmezer (yellow card) 90+2'	Stadium: City of Rize Stadium; Attendance: 3,573; Referee: Çağdaş Altay

2 February 2025 22	Adana Demispor	3–5	Kasımpaşa	Adana
1:30 (UTC-3)	Kalender 13'; Güler (yellow card) 36'; Alioui 57'; Aymbetov 89'; Aktaş (yellow card) 90+2'	Report	Fall 16', 82'; Barák (yellow card) 36'; Hajradinović 73' (pen.); Kara 75'; Keleş 79'; Opoku (yellow card) 90+1'	Stadium: New Adana Stadium; Referee: Çağdaş Altay

9 February 2025 23	Galatasaray	3–0; Awarded	Adana Demirspor	Sarıyer, Istanbul
19:00 (UTC+3)	Morata 12' (pen.)	Report 1 Report 2 Report 3	Kurtulan (yellow card) 21'	Stadium: Rams Park; Attendance: 36,270; Referee: Oğuzhan Çakır; Assistant referees: İbrahim Çağlar Uyarcan, Volkan Ahmet Narinç; Fourth official: Davut Dakul Çelik
Note: Adana Demirspor withdrew from the field in the 33rd minute of the match and went to the dressing room. Approximately 25 minutes later, the referee of the match, Oğuzhan Çakır, announced over the stadium loudspeakers that the match was cancelled. Turkish Football Federation (TFF) announced that it would make the decision regarding the match in the coming days. According to the statement published on 13 February 2025, it was decided that Adana Demirspor, which withdrew from the field, would be deemed defeated by 3–0 and its three points would be deducted.

14 February 2025 24	Adana Demispor	1–1	Antalyaspor	Adana
20:00 (UTC-3)	Alioui 28' (pen.); Kurtulan (yellow card) 49'; Maestro (yellow card) 81'; Aymbetov (yellow card) 89'; Kol (yellow card) 90+7'	Report	Balcı (yellow card) 27'; Rakip (yellow card) 30'; Vural (yellow card) 32'; Larsson 45' van de Streek (yellow card) 45+6'; Djenepo (yellow card) 64'; Gaich (yellow card) 82'	Stadium: New Adana Stadium; Attendance: 2,306; Referee: Kadir Sağlam

=== Turkish Cup ===
3 December 2024 Fourth round	Adana Demirspor	4–3 (a.e.t.)	Sebat Gençlik Spor	Adana
12:00 (UTC-3)	Kalender 51' Güler 60' Kurtulan (yellow card) 61', (goal) 104' Shehu 63' Çelik (yellow card) 80'	Report	Gülen 35', 41' Balcı 67' (pen.)	Stadium: New Adana Stadium; Referee: Erkan Özdamar

19 December 2024 Fifth round	Kırklarelispor	2–0	Adana Demirspor	Kırklareli
8:30 (UTC-3)	Derici 65', 90+7'	Report	Aydoğan (yellow card) 58' Çelik (red card) 60' Burak (yellow card) 90+1'	Stadium: Kırklareli Atatürk Stadium; Referee: Ömer Faruk Turtay
