= List of Turkish football transfers summer 2026 =

This is a list of Turkish football transfers for the summer sale prior to the 2026–27 season. Only moves featuring at least one Süper Lig club are listed.

The summer transfer window officially runs between 22 June 2026 and 4 September 2026. Players without a club may join one at any time. Additionally, clubs may sign players on loan, and a transfer may be completed after the deadline if paperwork is submitted in time.

== Transfers ==
Date	Player	Moving from	Moving to	Fee
1 July 2026	(Turkey) Orkun Kökçü	(Portugal) S.L. Benfica	(Turkey) Beşiktaş J.K.	€30.00m
	Sékou Koïta	(Russia) CSKA Moscow	Gençlerbirliği S.K.	€1.60m
	Sidiki Cherif	Angers SCO	Fenerbahçe S.K.	€18.00m
	Wilfried Zaha	Galatasaray S.K.	Free agent	-
	Eldor Shomurodov	AS Roma	İstanbul Başakşehir F.K.	€2.80m
	Olivier Ntcham	Samsunspor	Free agent	-
	Habib Keïta	Clermont Foot 63	Kocaelispor	€700k
	Ruslan Malinovskyi	Genoa CFC	Trabzonspor	Free
	Léo Duarte	İstanbul Başakşehir F.K.	Clube Atlético Mineiro	Free
	Ernest Muçi	Beşiktaş J.K.	Trabzonspor	€8.50m
	Uğur Kaan Yıldız	Göztepe S.K.	Kocaelispor	Free
	Oleksandr Zubkov	Trabzonspor	AEK Athens F.C.	€4.00m
	Sinclair Armstrong	Bristol City F.C.	Göztepe S.K.	€1.75m
	Aleksandar Jovanović	Partizan	Kocaelispor	Undisclosed
		Konyaspor	Araz-Naxçıvan	Undisclosed
	Arda Okan Kurtulan	Adana Demirspor	Göztepe	Free
	Kubilay Kanatsızkuş	Göztepe	Kasımpaşa	Free
	Eden Kartsev	İstanbul Başakşehir	Shenzhen Peng City	Undisclosed
	İbrahim Kaya	Bandırmaspor	Alanyaspor	Undisclosed
	Ali Yavuz Kol	Adana Demirspor	Kasımpaşa	Free
	João Mário	Benfica	Beşiktaş	€2m
	Nihad Mujakić	Partizan	Eyüpspor	Free
	Fernando Muslera	Galatasaray	Estudiantes (LP)	Free
	Lasse Nielsen	Göztepe	Vejle	Free
	Uchenna Ogundu	Şanlıurfaspor	Alanyaspor	Free
	Paul Onuachu	Southampton	Trabzonspor	Undisclosed
	Furkan Orak	Esenler Erokspor	Çaykur Rizespor	Undisclosed
	Emir Ortakaya	Fenerbahçe	Eyüpspor	Free
	Yasin Özcan	Kasımpaşa	(England) Aston Villa	£5.83m
	Wagner Pina	Estoril	Trabzonspor	Undisclosed
	Louka Prip	Konyaspor	Jagiellonia Białystok	Free
	Ibrahim Sabra	Al-Wehdat	Göztepe	Undisclosed
	(Germany) Leroy Sané	(Germany) Bayern Munich	Galatasaray	Free
	Luca Stančić	Bayern Munich	İstanbul Başakşehir	Undisclosed
	(Iceland) Logi Tómasson	(Norway) Strømsgodset	Samsunspor	€700k
	Ahmed Touba	İstanbul Başakşehir	Panathinaikos	Free
	Cem Üstündağ	WSG Tirol	Kasımpaşa	Free
2 July 2025	İzzet Çelik	Adana Demirspor	Alanyaspor	Undisclosed
2 July 2025	Kerem Demirbay	Galatasaray	Eyüpspor	Undisclosed
2 July 2025	Serdar Gürler	İstanbul Başakşehir	Eyüpspor	Free
2 July 2025	Uchenna Ogundu	Şanlıurfaspor	Alanyaspor	Undisclosed
3 July 2025	Berkay Aslan	FC Augsburg	İstanbul Başakşehir	Undisclosed
3 July 2025	Maestro	Adana Demirspor	Alanyaspor	Undisclosed
3 July 2025	Bedirhan Özyurt	İstanbul Başakşehir	Alanyaspor	Undisclosed
3 July 2025	Thalisson	Antalyaspor	Gençlerbirliği	Undisclosed
4 July 2025	Bright Osayi-Samuel	Fenerbahçe	Birmingham City	Free
5 July 2025	Moussa Kyabou	Sheriff Tiraspol	Gençlerbirliği	Free
5 July 2025	Joseph Nonge	Juventus	Kocaelispor	Undisclosed
6 July 2025	João Figueiredo	İstanbul Başakşehir	Johor Darul Ta'zim	Undisclosed
7 July 2025	Yhoan Andzouana	DAC 1904	Konyaspor	Undisclosed
9 July 2025	Massadio Haïdara	Brest	Kocaelispor	Free
9 July 2025	Enzo Roco	Al-Riyadh	Fatih Karagümrük	Undisclosed
10 July 2025	Edin Džeko	Fenerbahçe	Fiorentina	Free
10 July 2025	Ciro Immobile	Beşiktaş	Bologna	Free
10 July 2025	Antoine Makoumbou	Cagliari	Samsunspor	Undisclosed
10 July 2025	Joe Mendes	Braga	Samsunspor	€1.2m
10 July 2025	Rhaldney	Atlético Goianiense	Göztepe	Undisclosed
11 July 2025	Juninho Bacuna	Al Wehda	Gaziantep	Undisclosed
11 July 2025	Yusuf Barası	Adana Demirspor	Kasımpaşa	Undisclosed
11 July 2025	Abdou Aziz Fall	Essamaye	Fenerbahçe	Undisclosed
11 July 2025	Dimitrios Goutas	Cardiff City	Gençlerbirliği	Free
11 July 2025	Kenneth Paal	Queens Park Rangers	Antalyaspor	Free
11 July 2025	Davie Selke	Hamburger SV	İstanbul Başakşehir	Free
12 July 2025	Felipe Augusto	Cercle Brugge	Trabzonspor	Undisclosed
12 July 2025	Jure Balkovec	Alanyaspor	Fatih Karagümrük	Free
12 July 2025	Enis Bardhi	Bodrum	Konyaspor	Free
12 July 2025	Archie Brown	Gent	Fenerbahçe	€7m
12 July 2025	Anthony Musaba	Sheffield Wednesday	Samsunspor	Undisclosed
13 July 2025	Tarık Çetin	Çaykur Rizespor	Fenerbahçe	Free
14 July 2025	Kévin Rodrigues	Kasımpaşa	Gaziantep	Undisclosed
16 July 2025	Jo Jin-ho	Fenerbahçe	Konyaspor	Free
17 July 2025	Ali Sowe	Rostov	Çaykur Rizespor	Undisclosed
18 July 2025	Lucas Calegari	Fluminense	Eyüpspor	Undisclosed
18 July 2025	Valentin Mihăilă	Parma	Çaykur Rizespor	Undisclosed
18 July 2025	Bruno Petković	Dinamo Zagreb	Kocaelispor	Free
20 July 2025	Qazim Laçi	Sparta Prague	Çaykur Rizespor	Undisclosed
21 July 2025	Henry Onyekuru	Al-Fayha	Gençlerbirliği	Free
22 July 2025	Tonio Teklić	Trabzonspor	Widzew Łódź	Undisclosed
22 July 2025	Emre Uzun	Antalyaspor	Beerschot	Undisclosed
23 July 2025	Amin Cherni	Laval	Göztepe	Undisclosed
24 July 2025	Georgi Dzhikiya	Khimki	Antalyaspor	Free
24 July 2025	Pedro Pereira	Monza	Gençlerbirliği	Free
25 July 2025	Oğulcan Ülgün	Konyaspor	Gençlerbirliği	Undisclosed
26 July 2025	Junior Olaitan	Grenoble	Göztepe	Undisclosed
26 July 2025	Kenan Pirić	Antalyaspor	Neftçi	Undisclosed
27 July 2025	Enver Kulašin	Borac Banja Luka	Gaziantep	Undisclosed
28 July 2025	Metehan Altunbaş	Adanaspor	Eyüpspor	Undisclosed
28 July 2025	Anfernee Dijksteel	Middlesbrough	Kocaelispor	Free
28 July 2025	Richie Omorowa	Excelsior	Samsunspor	Undisclosed
28 July 2025	Bakhtiyar Zaynutdinov	Beşiktaş	Dynamo Moscow	Undisclosed
30 July 2025	Andri Baldursson	Bologna	Kasımpaşa	Undisclosed
30 July 2025	Sergio Córdova	Alanyaspor	Young Boys	Undisclosed
30 July 2025	Kerem Atakan Kesgin	Beşiktaş	Sivasspor	Undisclosed
30 July 2025	Marius Ștefănescu	FCSB	Konyaspor	Undisclosed
31 July 2025	Abbosbek Fayzullaev	CSKA Moscow	İstanbul Başakşehir	Undisclosed
31 July 2025	Gedson Fernandes	Beşiktaş	Spartak Moscow	Undisclosed
31 July 2025	Victor Osimhen	Napoli	Galatasaray	Undisclosed
31 July 2025	Nélson Semedo	Wolverhampton Wanderers	Fenerbahçe	Free
31 July 2025	Milan Škriniar	Paris Saint-Germain	Fenerbahçe	Undisclosed
1 August 2025	Efkan Bekiroğlu	Ankaragücü	Göztepe	Undisclosed
1 August 2025	Enis Destan	Trabzonspor	Hull City	Free
1 August 2025	Pape Habib Guèye	Aberdeen	Kasımpaşa	Undisclosed
1 August 2025	Ruan	Atlético Goianiense	Göztepe	Undisclosed
2 August 2025	Abdurrahim Dursun	Antalyaspor	Gençlerbirliği	Free
3 August 2025	David Tijanić	Göztepe	Al-Najma	Undisclosed
4 August 2025	Nikola Storm	Mechelen	Antalyaspor	Undisclosed
4 August 2025	Miha Zajc	Fenerbahçe	Dinamo Zagreb	Free
5 August 2025	Dilhan Demir	Wuppertaler SV	Gençlerbirliği	Free
5 August 2025	Philippe Kény	İstanbul Başakşehir	Zürich	Undisclosed
7 August 2025	Godfried Frimpong	Moreirense	Kasımpaşa	Free
7 August 2025	Kazeem Olaigbe	Rennes	Trabzonspor	Undisclosed
7 August 2025	Nazım Sangaré	Göztepe	Gaziantep	Undisclosed
8 August 2025	Wilfred Ndidi	Leicester City	Beşiktaş	Undisclosed
9 August 2025	Abdülsamet Burak	Adana Demirspor	Kayserispor	Free
9 August 2025	Stefano Denswil	Trabzonspor	Kayserispor	Free
9 August 2025	Gideon Jung	Greuther Fürth	Kayserispor	Free
9 August 2025	João Mendes	Vitória de Guimarães	Kayserispor	Free
9 August 2025	Aaron Opoku	1. FC Kaiserslautern	Kayserispor	Free
9 August 2025	Dorukhan Toköz	Eyüpspor	Kayserispor	Free
10 August 2025	Arthur Masuaku	Beşiktaş	Sunderland	Free
13 August 2025	Jesper Ceesay	Norrköping	Antalyaspor	Undisclosed
13 August 2025	Lautaro Giannetti	Udinese	Antalyaspor	Undisclosed
14 August 2025	Karol Linetty	Torino	Kocaelispor	Free
14 August 2025	Berke Özer	Eyüpspor	Lille	Undisclosed
15 August 2025	David Akintola	Çaykur Rizespor	Hull City	Free
15 August 2025	Toni Borevković	Vitória de Guimarães	Samsunspor	Undisclosed
15 August 2025	Rômulo	Göztepe	RB Leipzig	Undisclosed
15 August 2025	Afonso Sousa	Lech Poznań	Samsunspor	Undisclosed
16 August 2025	Taylan Bulut	Schalke 04	Beşiktaş	Undisclosed
18 August 2025	Emir Bars	Jong PSV	Konyaspor	Undisclosed
19 August 2025	Derrick Köhn	Galatasaray	Union Berlin	€4m
19 August 2025	Dorgeles Nene	Red Bull Salzburg	Fenerbahçe	Undisclosed
19 August 2025	Adama Traoré	Ferencváros	Gençlerbirliği	Undisclosed
20 August 2025	Jackson Muleka	Al-Kholood	Konyaspor	Undisclosed
20 August 2025	Christ Inao Oulaï	Bastia	Trabzonspor	Undisclosed
21 August 2025	Luis Pérez	Valladolid	Gaziantep	Free
21 August 2025	Mathias Ross	Galatasaray	Plymouth Argyle	Free
22 August 2025	Tayfur Bingöl	Beşiktaş	Kocaelispor	Undisclosed
23 August 2025	Rıdvan Yılmaz	Rangers	Beşiktaş	Undisclosed
25 August 2025	Juan	Southampton	Göztepe	Undisclosed
26 August 2025	Dario Šarić	Palermo	Antalyaspor	Undisclosed
27 August 2025	Tiago Djaló	Juventus	Beşiktaş	Undisclosed
28 August 2025	Melih Kabasakal	Eyüpspor	Gaziantep	Undisclosed
28 August 2025	Lincoln	Fenerbahçe	Alverca	Undisclosed
28 August 2025	Wilfried Singo	Monaco	Galatasaray	€30.8m
30 August 2025	M'Baye Niang	Sampdoria	Gençlerbirliği	Free
1 September 2025	Yusuf Akçiçek	Fenerbahçe	Al Hilal	€22m
1 September 2025	Efe Akman	Galatasaray	Andorra	Undisclosed
1 September 2025	Kerem Aktürkoğlu	Benfica	Fenerbahçe	€22.5m
1 September 2025	Marco Asensio	Paris Saint-Germain	Fenerbahçe	€8.5m
1 September 2025	Drissa Camara	Parma	Gaziantep	Undisclosed
1 September 2025	Darko Churlinov	Burnley	Kocaelispor	Undisclosed
1 September 2025	Ederson	Manchester City	Fenerbahçe	Undisclosed
1 September 2025	Ricardo Esgaio	Sporting CP	Fatih Karagümrük	Free
1 September 2025	Rony Lopes	Alanyaspor	Tondela	Undisclosed
1 September 2025	Andraž Šporar	Alanyaspor	Slovan Bratislava	Free
2 September 2025	Keny Arroyo	Beşiktaş	Cruzeiro	Undisclosed
2 September 2025	Uğurcan Çakır	Trabzonspor	Galatasaray	€27.5m
2 September 2025	Václav Černý	VfL Wolfsburg	Beşiktaş	Undisclosed
2 September 2025	Tanguy Coulibaly	Montpellier	Samsunspor	Undisclosed
2 September 2025	İlkay Gündoğan	Manchester City	Galatasaray	Free
4 September 2025	Youssef Aït Bennasser	Samsunspor	Kayserispor	Free
4 September 2025	Ianis Hagi	Rangers	Alanyaspor	Free
4 September 2025	Matías Kranevitter	River Plate	Fatih Karagümrük	Undisclosed
5 September 2025	Benjamin Bouchouari	Saint-Étienne	Trabzonspor	Undisclosed
6 September 2025	Franco Tongya	Salernitana	Gençlerbirliği	Undisclosed
9 September 2025	Fousseni Diabaté	Lausanne-Sport	Kasımpaşa	Free
9 September 2025	Alexander Djiku	Fenerbahçe	Spartak Moscow	Undisclosed
9 September 2025	Mateusz Łęgowski	Salernitana	Eyüpspor	Free
10 September 2025	Sam Larsson	Antalyaspor	Fatih Karagümrük	Free
11 September 2025	Tuğra Turhan	Grasshopper	İstanbul Başakşehir	Free
12 September 2025	Doğan Alemdar	Rennes	İstanbul Başakşehir	Undisclosed
12 September 2025	Samuel Ballet	Como	Antalyaspor	Undisclosed
12 September 2025	Serdar Dursun	Persepolis	Kocaelispor	Free
12 September 2025	Meschak Elia	Young Boys	Alanyaspor	Undisclosed
12 September 2025	Jakub Kałuziński	Antalyaspor	İstanbul Başakşehir	Undisclosed
12 September 2025	Cherif Ndiaye	Red Star Belgrade	Samsunspor	Undisclosed
12 September 2025	Rob Nizet	Willem II	Gaziantep	Undisclosed
12 September 2025	German Onugkha	Copenhagen	Kayserispor	Undisclosed
12 September 2025	Ruan	Portimonense	Alanyaspor	Undisclosed
12 September 2025	Emre Taşdemir	Gaziantep	Kasımpaşa	Free
12 September 2025	Bertuğ Yıldırım	Rennes	İstanbul Başakşehir	Undisclosed
14 September 2025	Deniz Dönmezer	Adana Demirspor	Kayserispor	Undisclosed
15 September 2025	Yohan Boli	Al-Gharafa	Antalyaspor	Free

== Loans ==
Start date	End date	Player	Moving from	Moving to	Note
1 July 2025	30 June 2026	Batuhan Çelik	İstanbul Başakşehir	Ümraniyespor	
1 July 2025	30 June 2026	David Jurásek	Benfica	Beşiktaş	
1 July 2025	30 June 2026	Nihad Mujakić	Partizan	Eyüpspor	
3 July 2025	30 June 2026	Tammy Abraham	Roma	Beşiktaş	
6 July 2025	30 June 2026	Jhon Durán	Al-Nassr	Fenerbahçe	
8 July 2025	30 June 2026	Halil Dervişoğlu	Galatasaray	Çaykur Rizespor	
10 July 2025	30 June 2026	Eldor Shomurodov	Roma	İstanbul Başakşehir	
10 July 2025	30 June 2026	Show	Maccabi Haifa	Kocaelispor	
11 July 2025	30 June 2026	Attila Szalai	TSG Hoffenheim	Kasımpaşa	
11 July 2025	30 June 2026	Nikoloz Ugrekhelidze	Dinamo Tbilisi	Fatih Karagümrük	
12 July 2025	30 June 2026	Orkun Kökçü	Benfica	Beşiktaş	
14 July 2025	30 June 2026	Baran Moğultay	Borussia Dortmund II	Alanyaspor	
18 July 2025	30 June 2026	Denis Drăguș	Trabzonspor	Eyüpspor	
21 July 2025	30 June 2026	Berkay Aydoğmuş	İstanbul Başakşehir	Sarıyer	
21 July 2025	30 June 2026	Emre Kaplan	İstanbul Başakşehir	Ümraniyespor	
21 July 2025	30 June 2026	Francis Nzaba	İstanbul Başakşehir	Esenler Erokspor	
22 July 2025	30 June 2026	Emre Demir	Fenerbahçe	Sakaryaspor	
23 July 2025	30 June 2026	Göktuğ Baytekin	Beşiktaş	Sakaryaspor	
24 July 2025	30 June 2026	Hamza Ljukovac	İstanbul Başakşehir	Teplice	
26 July 2025	30 June 2026	Tomáš Čvančara	Borussia Mönchengladbach	Antalyaspor	
26 July 2025	30 June 2026	Abdülkadir Ömür	Hull City	Antalyaspor	
28 July 2025	31 December 2025	Richie Omorowa	Samsunspor	Degerfors	
30 July 2025	30 June 2026	Berkay Özcan	İstanbul Başakşehir	Fatih Karagümrük	
30 July 2025	30 June 2026	Mateusz Wieteska	Cagliari	Kocaelispor	
31 July 2025	30 June 2026	John Lundstram	Trabzonspor	Hull City	
3 August 2025	30 June 2026	Semih Kılıçsoy	Beşiktaş	Cagliari	
5 August 2025	30 June 2026	Przemysław Frankowski	Galatasaray	Rennes	
7 August 2025	30 June 2026	Ivo Grbić	Sheffield United	Fatih Karagümrük	
8 August 2025	30 June 2026	Arda Kılıç	Beşiktaş	Novi Pazar	
9 August 2025	30 June 2026	Burak Kapacak	Fenerbahçe	Kayserispor	
9 August 2025	30 June 2026	Indrit Tuci	Sparta Prague	Kayserispor	
13 August 2025	30 June 2026	Can Keleş	Beşiktaş	Kocaelispor	
14 August 2025	30 June 2026	Fahri Kerem Ay	Beşiktaş	İstanbulspor	
14 August 2025	30 June 2026	Matchoi Djaló	İstanbul Başakşehir	Wisła Płock	
14 August 2025	30 June 2026	Omar Fayed	Fenerbahçe	Arouca	
15 August 2025	30 June 2026	Marcos Felipe	Bahia	Eyüpspor	
15 August 2025	30 June 2026	Zafer Görgen	Çaykur Rizespor	Gaziantep	
16 August 2025	30 June 2026	László Bénes	Union Berlin	Kayserispor	
16 August 2025	15 January 2026	Albert Posiadała	Molde	Samsunspor	
18 August 2025	30 June 2026	Élan Ricardo	Beşiktaş	Athletico Paranaense	
20 August 2025	30 June 2026	Sékou Koïta	CSKA Moscow	Gençlerbirliği	
21 August 2025	30 June 2026	Victor Nelsson	Galatasaray	Hellas Verona	
22 August 2025	30 June 2026	Oleksandr Syrota	Dynamo Kyiv	Kocaelispor	
23 August 2025	30 June 2026	Edson Álvarez	West Ham United	Fenerbahçe	
24 August 2025	30 June 2026	Emrecan Terzi	Beşiktaş	Serikspor	
26 August 2025	30 June 2026	El Bilal Touré	Atalanta	Beşiktaş	
27 August 2025	30 June 2026	Arbnor Muja	Samsunspor	Sint-Truiden	
29 August 2025	30 June 2026	Al-Musrati	Beşiktaş	Hellas Verona	
30 August 2025	30 June 2026	Muhammed Cham	Trabzonspor	Slavia Prague	
31 August 2025	30 June 2026	Mohamed Bayo	Lille	Gaziantep	
31 August 2025	30 June 2026	Elias Jelert	Galatasaray	Southampton	
31 August 2025	30 June 2026	Emre Saglam	Gençlerbirliği	Melbourne Victory	
1 September 2025	30 June 2026	Sofyan Amrabat	Fenerbahçe	Real Betis	
1 September 2025	30 June 2026	Diego Carlos	Fenerbahçe	Como	
1 September 2025	30 June 2026	Amir Hadžiahmetović	Beşiktaş	Hull City	
1 September 2025	30 June 2026	Dominik Livaković	Fenerbahçe	Girona	
1 September 2025	30 June 2026	Batista Mendy	Trabzonspor	Sevilla	
1 September 2025	30 June 2026	Jean Onana	Beşiktaş	Genoa	
1 September 2025	30 June 2026	Nicolò Zaniolo	Galatasaray	Udinese	
2 September 2025	31 December 2025	Carlos Cuesta	Galatasaray	Vasco da Gama	
6 September 2025	30 June 2026	Ernest Muçi	Beşiktaş	Trabzonspor	
6 September 2025	30 June 2026	Hrvoje Smolčić	Eintracht Frankfurt	Kocaelispor	
7 September 2025	30 June 2026	Tayyip Talha Sanuç	Beşiktaş	Gaziantep	
8 September 2025	30 June 2026	Botond Balogh	Parma	Kocaelispor	
8 September 2025	30 June 2026	Ognjen Mimović	Fenerbahçe	Pafos	
8 September 2025	30 June 2026	Cengiz Ünder	Fenerbahçe	Beşiktaş	
10 September 2025	30 June 2026	Mirza Cihan	Gaziantep	Sakaryaspor	
10 September 2025	30 June 2026	Kevin Csoboth	St. Gallen	Gençlerbirliği	
11 September 2025	30 June 2026	André Onana	Manchester United	Trabzonspor	
12 September 2025	30 June 2026	Eyüp Aydın	Galatasaray	Samsunspor	
12 September 2025	30 June 2026	Tom Dele-Bashiru	Watford	Gençlerbirliği	
12 September 2025	30 June 2026	Deniz Dilmen	İstanbul Başakşehir	Pendikspor	
12 September 2025	30 June 2026	Amine Harit	Marseille	İstanbul Başakşehir	
12 September 2025	30 June 2026	Yusuf Kabadayı	FC Augsburg	Gaziantep	
12 September 2025	30 June 2026	Habib Keïta	Clermont Foot	Kocaelispor	
12 September 2025	30 June 2026	João Mário	Beşiktaş	AEK Athens	
12 September 2025	30 June 2026	Steve Mounié	FC Augsburg	Alanyaspor	
12 September 2025	30 June 2026	Jesurun Rak-Sakyi	Crystal Palace	Çaykur Rizespor	
12 September 2025	30 June 2026	Jota Silva	Nottingham Forest	Beşiktaş	
12 September 2025	30 June 2026	Adama Traoré	Gençlerbirliği	Al-Ula	
12 September 2025	30 June 2026	Emrecan Uzunhan	Beşiktaş	İstanbulspor	
12 September 2025	30 June 2026	Ricardo Velho	Farense	Gençlerbirliği	
12 September 2025	30 June 2026	Jankat Yılmaz	Galatasaray	Eyüpspor	
13 September 2025	30 June 2026	David Datro Fofana	Chelsea	Fatih Karagümrük	
13 September 2025	30 June 2026	Baran Ali Gezek	Kayserispor	Eyüpspor	
13 September 2025	30 June 2026	Dal Varešanović	Çaykur Rizespor	Gençlerbirliği	
