= 2023–24 Adana Demirspor season =

Adana Demirspor
2023–24 season
- President: Murat Sancak
- Head coach: Patrick Kluivert (until 4 December); Serkan Damla (from 4 December to 18 January); Hikmet Karaman (from 18 January)
- Stadium: New Adana Stadium
- Süper Lig: 12th
- Turkish Cup: Fifth round
- UEFA Europa Conference League: Play-off round
- Top goalscorer: League: M'Baye Niang (8); All: Emre Akbaba (9)
- Highest home attendance: 24,986 vs Genk
- Lowest home attendance: 7,488 vs Çaykur Rizespor
- Average home league attendance: 11,444
- Biggest win: Adana Demirspor 5–1 Osijek
- Biggest defeat: Adana Demirspor 1–6 Gaziantep
colours	Away colours	Third colours

The 2023–24 season was Adana Demirspor's 84th season in existence and third consecutive in the Süper Lig. They also competed in the Turkish Cup and the UEFA Europa Conference League.

== Players ==
=== First-team squad ===
As of 15 February 2024

Note: Flags indicate national team as defined under FIFA eligibility rules; some limited exceptions apply. Players may hold more than one non-FIFA nationality.

No.	Pos.	Nation	Player
1	GK	TUR	Yılmaz Aktaş
2	DF	TUR	İsmail Çokçalış
4	DF	GER	Semih Güler (Vice-captain)
5	DF	GLP	Andreaw Gravillon
6	MF	TUR	Tayfun Aydoğan
7	FW	TUR	Yusuf Sarı
8	MF	TUR	Emre Akbaba
9	FW	ITA	Mario Balotelli
10	MF	FRA	Nabil Alioui
11	FW	COL	Stiven Mendoza
13	DF	IRI	Milad Mohammadi
14	MF	ESP	José Rodríguez
15	DF	MKD	Jovan Manev
16	MF	TUR	İzzet Çelik
17	FW	KAZ	Abat Aymbetov

No.	Pos.	Nation	Player
19	MF	TUR	Mustafa Kapı
20	MF	FRA	Édouard Michut
21	DF	TUR	Abdulsamet Burak
26	MF	TUR	Dorukhan Toköz
30	FW	POR	Nani
32	MF	TUR	Yusuf Erdoğan
39	GK	TUR	Vedat Karakuş
56	FW	TUR	Yusuf Barası
60	FW	TUR	Ozan Demirbağ
66	DF	SEN	Pape Abou Cissé
71	GK	AZE	Shakhruddin Magomedaliyev
77	FW	TUR	Motez Nourani
93	FW	FRA	Breyton Fougeu
—	DF	ALG	Youcef Atal
—	MF	ANG	Maestro

=== Out on loan ===
Note: Flags indicate national team as defined under FIFA eligibility rules; some limited exceptions apply. Players may hold more than one non-FIFA nationality.

No.	Pos.	Nation	Player
—	GK	TUR	Murat Eser (on loan at İstanbulspor until 30 June 2024)
—	DF	TUR	Ertuğrul Eramil (on loan at Büyükçekmece Tepecikspor until 30 June 2024)
—	DF	TUR	Tolga Kalender (on loan at Diyarbekir Spor until 30 June 2024)
—	MF	TUR	Aksel Aktaş (on loan at Tuzlaspor until 30 June 2024)
—	MF	MLI	Mahamadou Ba (on loan at Tuzlaspor until 30 June 2024)
—	MF	TUR	Bünyamin Balat (on loan at Adana 1954 FK until 30 June 2024)
—	MF	TUR	Burhan Ersoy (on loan at Nevşehir Belediyespor until 30 June 2024)

No.	Pos.	Nation	Player
—	MF	CMR	Samuel Nongoh (on loan at Slaven Belupo until 30 June 2024)
—	FW	BIH	Hamza Jaganjac (on loan at Istra 1961 until 30 June 2024)
—	FW	TUR	Salih Kavrazlı (on loan at Nazilli Belediyespor until 30 June 2024)
—	FW	TUR	Ali Yavuz Kol (on loan at Esenler Erokspor until 30 June 2024)
—	FW	ALB	Arda Okan Kurtulan (on loan at Diyarbekirspor until 30 June 2024)
—	FW	ALB	Florent Shehu (on loan at Zrinski Osječko until 30 June 2024)

== Transfers ==
=== In ===
Pos.	Player	Transferred from	Fee	Date	Source
DF	(North Macedonia) Jovan Manev	(North Macedonia) Bregalnica Štip	Undisclosed	1 July 2023	
MF	(Nigeria) Henry Onyekuru	(Greece) Olympiacos	€3,500,000	1 July 2023	
MF	(Turkey) Tayfun Aydoğan	(Turkey) Kocaelispor	Free	6 July 2023	
MF	(Portugal) Nani	Unattached	Free	13 July 2023	
MF	(Turkey) Dorukhan Toköz	(Turkey) Trabzonspor	Free	21 July 2023	
DF	(Guadeloupe) Andreaw Gravillon	(France) Reims	Undisclosed	24 July 2023	
DF	(Slovenia) Amir Feratovič	(Portugal) Estrela da Amadora	Undisclosed	5 August 2023	
FW	(Senegal) M'Baye Niang	(France) Auxerre	Free	9 August 2023	
FW	(Turkey) Yusuf Barası	(Netherlands) AZ Alkmaar	Undisclosed	26 August 2023	
FW	(Kosovo) Arbër Zeneli	(France) Reims	Undisclosed	2 September 2023	
GK	(Azerbaijan) Shakhruddin Magomedaliyev	(Azerbaijan) Qarabağ	Undisclosed	8 September 2023	
MF	(Albania) Florent Shehu	(Switzerland) Luzern U21	Free	13 September 2023	
FW	(Italy) Mario Balotelli	(Switzerland) Sion	Free	15 September 2023	
MF	(France) Edouard Michut	(France) Paris Saint-Germain	Loan	15 September 2023	
DF	(Senegal) Pape Abou Cissé	(Greece) Olympiacos	€600,000	15 September 2023	
MF	(Tunisia) Motez Nourani	(Tunisia) US Tataouine	€100,000	11 January 2024	
MF	(France) Edouard Michut	(France) Paris Saint-Germain	Undisclosed	24 January 2024	
DF	(Iran) Milad Mohammadi	(Greece) AEK Athens	Undisclosed	25 January 2024	
MF	(France) Nabil Alioui	(France) Le Havre	Undisclosed	2 February 2024	
MF	(Spain) José Rodríguez	Hapoel Tel Aviv	€300,000	7 February 2024	
DF	(Algeria) Youcef Atal	(France) Nice	Free	9 February 2024	

=== Out ===
Pos.	Player	Transferred to	Fee	Date	Source
FW	(Turkey) Volkan Şen	Released		1 July 2023	
MF	(Turkey) Erhun Oztumer	Released		1 July 2023	
MF	(Switzerland) Gökhan Inler	Released		1 July 2023	
MF	(Turkey) Sedat Şahintürk	(Turkey) Menemen	Free	14 July 2023	
MF	(Turkey) Mustafa Kapı	(Turkey) Tuzlaspor	Loan	19 July 2023	
FW	(Turkey) Ali Yavuz Kol	(Turkey) Esenler Erokspor	Loan	19 July 2023	
DF	(Ivory Coast) Simon Deli	Released		20 July 2023	
FW	(Norway) Fredrik Gulbrandsen	Released		4 August 2023	
MF	(Nigeria) Henry Onyekuru	(Saudi Arabia) Al-Fayha	Undisclosed	11 August 2023	
FW	(Albania) Arda Okan Kurtulan	(Turkey) Diyarbakırspor	Loan	15 August 2023	
MF	(Germany) Bünyamin Balat	(Turkey) Diyarbakırspor	Loan	16 August 2023	
FW	(Turkey) Salih Kavrazlı	(Turkey) Nazilli Belediyespor	Loan	29 August 2023	
FW	(Senegal) Cherif Ndiaye	(Serbia) Red Star Belgrade	€1,400,000	4 September 2023	
DF	(North Macedonia) Jovan Manev	(Croatia) Osijek	Loan	5 September 2023	
FW	(Cameroon) Samuel Nongoh	(Croatia) Slaven Belupo	Loan	14 September 2023	
DF	(Portugal) Kévin Rodrigues	Released		1 January 2024	
MF	(Morocco) Younès Belhanda	Released		1 January 2024	
DF	(Norway) Jonas Svensson	Released		6 January 2024	
FW	(Kosovo) Arbër Zeneli	Released		18 January 2024	
FW	(Senegal) M'Baye Niang	(Italy) Empoli	€250,000	31 January 2024	
MF	(Portugal) Nani	Released		13 May 2024	

Notes
1.Joined Molde on 31 August 2023.
2.Joined Beşiktaş on 14 September 2023.
3.Joined Al Qadsiah on 31 January 2024.
4.Joined Al-Shamal on 26 January 2024

== Pre-season and friendlies ==
Win Draw Loss

8 July 2023 Friendly	Adana Demirspor (Turkey)	5–0	(Moldova) Sucleia	Kaynaşlı
17:30 UTC+3	B. Ndiaye 5'; Belhanda 27'; C. Ndiaye 34'; Fredrik Gulbrandsen 50'; Akbaba 75'			Stadium: Fenerbahce SK Topuk Yaylasi Tesisleri

11 July 2023 Friendly	Adana Demirspor (Turkey)	3–0	(Iran) Tractor	Kaynaşlı
17:30 UTC+3	Erdoğan 49'; Akbaba 76' (pen.); Gulbrandsen 81'			Stadium: Fenerbahce SK Topuk Yaylasi Tesisleri

21 July 2023 Friendly	Adana Demirspor (Turkey)	2–3	(Turkey) Manisa	Bolu
18:00 UTC+3	C. Ndiaye 19'; Sari 80'		Gürbulak 45'; Gakpa 45+1'; Altunbaş 76'	Stadium: Koru Hotel Futbol Sahası

27 March 2024 Friendly	Adana Demirspor (Turkey)	2–1	(Turkey) Hatayspor
16:30 UTC+3

== Competitions ==
=== Overall record ===
Competition	First match	Last match	Starting round	Final position	Record							
Competition	First match	Last match	Starting round	Final position	Pld	W	D	L	GF	GA	GD	Win %
Süper Lig	13 August 2023	26 May 2024	Matchday 1	12th	38	10	14	14	54	61	−7	26.32
Turkish Cup	17 January 2024		Fifth round	Fifth round	1	0	1	0	2	2	+0	0.00
UEFA Europa Conference League	27 July 2023	31 August 2023	Second qualifying round	Play-off round	6	3	1	2	12	8	+4	50.00
Total					45	13	16	16	68	71	−3	28.89

Source: Soccerway

=== Süper Lig ===
==== League table ====
Pos	Team	Pld	W	D	L	GF	GA	GD	Pts
10	Antalyaspor	38	12	13	13	44	49	−5	49
11	Gaziantep	38	12	8	18	50	57	−7	44 (Note: Gaziantep are ahead of Adana Demirspor on head-to-head points: Gaziantep 2–2 Adana Demirspor, Adana Demirspor 1–6 Gaziantep.)
12	Adana Demirspor	38	10	14	14	54	61	−7	44
13	Samsunspor	38	11	10	17	42	52	−10	43
14	Kayserispor (Note: 3 points deducted)	38	11	12	15	44	57	−13	42

Source: Süper Lig
Rules for classification: 1) Points; 2) Head-to-head points; 3) Head-to-head goal difference; 4) Head-to-head goals scored; 5) Goal difference; 6) Goals scored; 7) Play-off.

==== Results summary ====
Overall								Home						Away					
Pld	W	D	L	GF	GA	GD	Pts	W	D	L	GF	GA	GD	W	D	L	GF	GA	GD
38	10	14	14	54	61	−7	44	9	4	6	33	30	+3	1	10	8	21	31	−10

Source: Trendyol Süper Lig

==== Results by round ====
Round	1	2	3	4	5	6	7	8	9	10	11	12	13	14	15	16	17	18	19	20	21	22	23	24	25	26	27	28	29	30	31	32	33	34	35	36	37	38
Ground	H	A	H	A	H	A	H	H	A	H	A	H	A	H	A	H	A	H	A	A	H	A	H	A	H	A	A	H	A	H	A	H	A	H	A	H	A	H
Result	W	D	W	D	W	L	W	W	L	W	D	D	D	L	L	D	D	W	D	L	D	D	L	L	L	D	L	W	D	W	L	D	D	L	W	L	L	L
Position	4	7	2	3	3	3	3	3	3	3	3	3	4	4	6	7	7	5	5	6	6	7	8	9	10	10	12	10	10	9	11	11	11	11	11	11	11	12

Source: Trendyol Süper Lig
A = Away; H = Home; W = Win; D = Draw; L = Loss

==== Matches ====
The league fixtures were unveiled on 18 July 2023.

13 August 2023 1	Adana Demirspor	2–1	Çaykur Rizespor	Adana
21:45 TRT (UTC+3)	Belhanda 27', (yellow card) 43'; Akbaba (yellow card) 30'; Niang (yellow card) 80'; Erdoğan 90+1'; Rodrigues (yellow card) 90+5'; Svensson (yellow card) 90+15'; Güler (yellow card) 90+16'	Report	Zeqiri (yellow card) 4'; Pinchi (yellow card) 58'; Pala (yellow card) 78'; Koç (yellow card) 81'; Mary 87'; Şahin (yellow card) 90+1'; Topçu (yellow card) 90+16'	Stadium: New Adana Stadium; Attendance: 7,488; Referee: Ümit Öztürk

21 August 2023 2	Ankaragücü	1–1	Adana Demirspor	Istanbul
21:00 TRT (UTC+3)	Bekiroğlu 42'; Ciğerci (yellow card) 90+1'	Report	Niang 26' (pen.); Rodrigues (yellow card) 90+3'	Stadium: Atatürk Olympic Stadium; Attendance: 628; Referee: Cihan Aydın
Note: The match was moved to Atatürk Olympic Stadium after Eryaman Stadium was deemed unsuitable after inspection.

3 September 2023 4	Hatayspor	3–3	Adana Demirspor	Mersin
21:45 TRT (UTC+3)	Aksoy (yellow card) 26'; Strandberg 53', 73' (pen.), (yellow card) 79'; Beyaz (yellow card) 58'; Dele-Bashiru 75', (yellow card) 76'; Bekaroğlu (yellow card) 81'; Alıcı (yellow card) 90+7'	Report	C. Ndiaye 40', (yellow card) 81'; Gravillon 84'; Güler (yellow card) 88'; Nani 89'	Stadium: Mersin Stadium; Attendance: 8,544; Referee: Sarper Barış Saka

16 September 2023 5	Adana Demirspor	3–0	Pendikspor	Adana
20:00 TRT (UTC+3)	Niang 15', 41'; Akbaba 88'	Report	Rassoul (yellow card) 45+4'; Vuković (yellow card) 82'; Romero (yellow card) 90+5'	Stadium: New Adana Stadium; Attendance: 7,932; Referee: Mert Güzenge

24 September 2023 6	Kasımpaşa	2–1	Adana Demirspor	Istanbul
20:00 TRT (UTC+3)	Kara 25', 51' (pen.), (yellow card) 27'; Omeruo (yellow card) 54'; Çiftpınar (yellow card) 90+3'; Ben Ouanes (yellow card) 90+4'	Report	Özbir (red card) 19'; Stambouli (yellow card) 40' (yellow-red card) 45+8'; Erdoğan 80' (pen.); Akbaba (yellow card) 90+5'; Kévin Rodrigues (red card) 90+7'	Stadium: Recep Tayyip Erdoğan Stadium; Attendance: 2,794; Referee: Yasin Kol

27 September 2023 3	Adana Demirspor	4–2	Beşiktaş	Adana
20:00 TRT (UTC+3)	Belhanda 8'; Niang 17'; Akbaba (yellow card) 55', (goal) 59'; Erdoğan 75', (yellow card) 76'	Report	Aboubakar 79'; Rashica 89'; Uysal (yellow card) 90+7'	Stadium: New Adana Stadium; Referee: Ümit Öztürk
Note: The match scheduled for 28 August 2023 was postponed due to the UEFA Conference League play-offs.

1 October 2023 7	Adana Demirspor	4–0	Alanyaspor	Adana
19:00 TRT (UTC+3)	Balotelli 30', 47'; Özbir (yellow card) 45'; Belhanda 71'; Aydoğan 87'; Niang (yellow card) 90+1'	Report	Augusto (yellow card) 24'; Novais (yellow card) 48'; Carlos Eduardo (yellow card) 45'	Stadium: New Adana Stadium; Referee: Ali Şansalan

6 October 2023 8	Adana Demirspor	1–0	Trabzonspor	Adana
20:00 TRT (UTC+3)	Nani 29', (yellow card) 54'; Gravillon (yellow card) 41'; Belhanda (yellow card) 52'; Özbir (yellow card) 76'; Toköz (yellow card) 90+8'	Report	Stryger Larsen (yellow card) 76'; Baniya (yellow card) 90+6'; Eren Elmalı (yellow card) 90+6'	Stadium: New Adana Stadium; Referee: Kadir Sağlam

23 October 2023 9	Fatih Karagümrük	2–0	Adana Demirspor	Istanbul
20:00 TRT (UTC+3)	Sangaré 52'; Dursun 89'	Report		Stadium: Atatürk Olympic Stadium; Referee: Bahattin Şimşek

28 October 2023 10	Adana Demirspor	3–0	Konyaspor	Adana
19:00	Niang 54', 90+3' (pen.); Balotelli 81'			Stadium: New Adana Stadium; Referee: Turut Doman

5 November 2023 11	Sivasspor	1–1	Adana Demirspor	Sivas
13:30	Koita 10'		Stambouli 57'	Stadium: New Sivas 4 Eylül Stadium; Referee: Burak Pakkan

12 November 2023 12	Adana Demirspor	0–0	Fenerbahçe	Adana
19:00				Stadium: New Adana Stadium; Referee: Halil Umut Meler

26 November 2023 13	Kayserispor	1–1	Adana Demirspor	Kayseri
13:30	Boa Morte 73'		Erdoğan 45+2'	Stadium: Kadir Has Stadium; Referee: Kadir Sağlam

2 December 2023 14	Adana Demirspor	2–3	Samsunspor	Adana
				Stadium: New Adana Stadium

8 December 2023 15	Galatasaray	3–1	Adana Demirspor	Istanbul
				Stadium: Rams Park

19 December 2023 17	Gaziantep	2–2	Adana Demirspor	Gaziantep
				Stadium: Gaziantep Stadium

24 December 2023 18	Adana Demirspor	2–1	Antalyaspor	Adana
				Stadium: New Adana Stadium

6 January 2024 19	İstanbul Başakşehir	0–0	Adana Demirspor	Istanbul
				Stadium: Başakşehir Fatih Terim Stadium

10 January 2024 16	Adana Demirspor	2–2	İstanbulspor	Adana
				Stadium: New Adana Stadium

13 January 2024 20	Çaykur Rizespor	1–0	Adana Demirspor	Rize
19:00	Mocsi 54'			Stadium: City of Rize Stadium; Referee: Volkan Bayarslan

20 January 2024 21	Adana Demirspor	1–1	Ankaragücü	Adana
19:00	Akbaba 52'; Michut (yellow card) 54'		Pedrinho 63'; Chatzigiovannis (yellow card) 90+2'	Stadium: New Adana Stadium; Referee: Arda Kardeşler

23 January 2024 22	Beşiktaş	0–0	Adana Demirspor	Istanbul
20:00	Bingöl (yellow card) 37'; Svensson (yellow card) 66'; Günok (yellow card) 85'; Rebić (yellow card) 90+5'		Barası (yellow card) 28' (yellow-red card) 48'; David (yellow card) 36'; Michut (yellow card) 37'	Stadium: Tüpraş Stadyumu; Referee: Atilla Karaoğlan

27 January 2024 23	Adana Demirspor	0–1	Hatayspor	Adana
19:00			Nani 44' (o.g.)	Stadium: New Adana Stadium; Referee: Mert Güzenge

4 February 2024 24	Pendikspor	2–1	Adana Demirspor	Istanbul
13:30	Diaby 11'; Nayir 22', (yellow card) 90+1'; Akbunar (yellow card) 43' (yellow-red card) 72'; Rassoul (yellow card) 66'		Michut (yellow card) 70'; Nani 90+10'	Stadium: Siltaş Yapı Pendik Stadyumu; Referee: Direnç Tonusluoğlu

9 February 2024 25	Adana Demirspor	1–3	Kasımpaşa	Adana
20:00	Gravillon (yellow card) 38'; Mohammadi (yellow card) 63'; Güler (yellow card) 67'; Balotelli 87', (yellow card) 88'; Nani (yellow card) 88'		Fall 29'; Kara 32'; Hajradinović 57' (pen.); Winck (yellow card) 67'; Yanar (yellow card) 72'; Ben Ouanes (yellow card) 86'	Stadium: New Adana Stadium; Referee: Burak Pakkan

18 February 2024 26	Alanyaspor	3–3	Adana Demirspor	Alanya
13:30	Sisto (yellow card) 13'; Balkovec 20', (yellow card) 90+7'; Aydın 33'; João Novais (penalty missed) 76', (yellow card) 81'; Hadergjonaj 76'; Aliti (yellow card) 90+6'		Akbaba 67' (pen.); Sarı 69', 90+7'; Karakuş (yellow card) 75'	Stadium: Alanya Oba Stadium; Referee: Bahattin Şimşek

25 February 2024 27	Trabzonspor	1–0	Adana Demirspor	Trabzon
16:00	Trézéguet 21'; Özdemir (yellow card) 82'; Elmalı (yellow card) 83'		Balotelli (yellow card) 44'; Mendoza (yellow card) 90'; Rodríguez (red card) 90+4'; Nani (yellow card) 90+5'	Stadium: Papara Park; Referee: Burak Şeker

4 March 2024 28	Adana Demirspor	1–0	Fatih Karagümrük	Adana
17:00				Stadium: New Adana Stadium; Referee: Murat Erdoğan

9 March 2024 29	Konyaspor	2–2	Adana Demirspor	Konya
16:00				Stadium: Konya Metropolitan Municipality Stadium; Referee: Volkan Bayarslan

16 March 2024 30	Adana Demirspor	4–1	Sivasspor	Adana
20:30				Stadium: New Adana Stadium; Referee: Tugay Kaan Numanoğlu

3 April 2024 31	Fenerbahçe	4–2	Adana Demirspor	Istanbul
20:30				Stadium: Şükrü Saracoğlu Stadium; Referee: Arda Kardeşler

13 April 2024 32	Adana Demirspor	0–0	Kayserispor	Adana
19:00				Stadium: New Adana Stadium; Referee: Mehmet Türkmen

20 April 2024 33	Samsunspor	1–1	Adana Demirspor	Samsun
19:00				Stadium: Samsun 19 Mayıs Stadium; Referee: Murat Erdoğan

26 April 2024 34	Adana Demirspor	0–3	Galatasaray	Adana
20:00				Stadium: New Adana Stadium; Referee: Bahattin Şimşek

4 May 2024 35	İstanbulspor	0–1	Adana Demirspor	Istanbul
16:00				Stadium: Esenyurt Necmi Kadıoğlu Stadium; Referee: Abdullah Buğra Taşkınsoy

12 May 2024 36	Adana Demirspor	1–6	Gaziantep	Adana
19:00				Stadium: New Adana Stadium; Referee: Abdulkadir Bitigen

17 May 2024 37	Antalyaspor	2–1	Adana Demirspor	Antalya
20:00	Mendoza 30' (o.g.); Yılmaz 74'		Aimbetov 65'	Stadium: Corendon Airlines Park; Referee: Turgut Doman

26 May 2024 38	Adana Demirspor	2–6	İstanbul Başakşehir	Adana
19:00	Aydoğan 37' (pen.); Mendoza 88'		Piątek 5', 13', 68' (pen.); Ergün (yellow card) 36'; Türüç (yellow card) 36'; Özcan 40'; Davidson 44'; Figueiredo 90+1'	Stadium: New Adana Stadium; Referee: Burak Şeker

=== Turkish Cup ===
17 January 2024 Fifth round	Adana Demirspor	2–2 (a.e.t.) (6–7 p)	24Erzincanspor	Adana
19:00	Michut 89'; Akbaba 90+2'		Alkurt 65'; Yiğiter 77'	Stadium: New Adana Stadium
	Penalties
	Akbaba (penalty scored); Nani (penalty scored); David (penalty scored); Gravillon (penalty scored); Erdoğan (penalty scored); Michut (penalty scored); Manev (penalty missed)		(penalty scored) İçer; (penalty scored) Alkurt; (penalty scored) Yılmaz; (penalty scored) Taşdelen; (penalty scored) Payal; (penalty scored) Işıkdemir; (penalty scored) Yiğiter

=== UEFA Europa Conference League ===
==== Second qualifying round ====
The draw for the second qualifying round was held on 21 June 2023.

27 July 2023 First leg	CFR Cluj (Romania)	1–1	(Turkey) Adana Demirspor	Cluj-Napoca, Romania
20:30 EEST (UTC+3)	Betancor 6'; Sava (yellow card) 64'; Krasniqi (yellow card) 88'; Bîrligea (yellow card) 89'	Report	Manev (yellow card) 51'; Gravillon (yellow card) 65'; Stambouli 77'; Rodrigues (yellow card) 90+6'	Stadium: Stadionul Dr. Constantin Rădulescu; Attendance: 9,847; Referee: Elchin Masiyev (Azerbaijan)

3 August 2023 Second leg	Adana Demirspor (Turkey)	2–1 (3–2 agg.)	(Romania) CFR Cluj	Adana
21:00 TRT (UTC+3)	Svensson (yellow card) 21'; David 43'; Gravillon (red card) 63'; C. Ndiaye (yellow card) 65', (goal) 90+3'; Belhanda (yellow card) 90+10'	Report	Bîrligea (yellow card) 65'; Mogos 68' (pen.); Ajeti (yellow card) 78'; Cvek (yellow card) 90+2'; Tachtsidis (yellow card) 90+6'	Stadium: New Adana Stadium; Attendance: 22,256; Referee: Nathan Verboomen (Belgium)

==== Third qualifying round ====
The draw for the third qualifying round was held on 24 July 2023.

10 August 2023 First leg	Adana Demirspor (Turkey)	5–1	(Croatia) Osijek	Adana
21:00 UTC+3	Svensson 3'; Sari 16'; C. Ndiaye 51', 67' (pen.); Belhanda (yellow card) 72'; Erdoğan 88'	Report	Malenica (yellow card) 65'; Lovrić (yellow card) 66'; Brlek (yellow card) 66'; Gržan 73' (pen.); Evangelou (yellow card) 78'	Stadium: New Adana Stadium; Attendance: 17,719; Referee: Goga Kikacheishvili (Georgia)

17 August 2023 Second leg	Osijek (Croatia)	3–2 (4–7 agg.)	(Turkey) Adana Demirspor	Osijek, Croatia
20:00 UTC+2	Lovrić (yellow card) 15'; Bukvić (yellow card) 17'; Nejašmić 43'; Caktaš 59'; Gržan (yellow card) 76', (goal) 82' (pen.); Brlek (yellow card) 84'	Report	C. Ndiaye (yellow card) 28'; Sari 31'; Stambouli (yellow card) 41'; Gravillon (yellow card) 71'; Güler (yellow card) 76'; Nani (yellow card) 84'; Erdoğan 90+1'	Stadium: Opus Arena; Attendance: 8,444; Referee: John Brooks (England)

==== Play-off round ====
The draw for the play-off round was held on 7 August 2023.

24 August 2023 First leg	Genk (Belgium)	2–1	(Turkey) Adana Demirspor	Genk, Belgium
20:00 UTC+2	McKenzie (yellow card) 24'; Muñoz (yellow card) 60', (goal) 90+3'; Arokodare 77'; Bonsu Baah (yellow card) 90+6'	Report	Gravillon (yellow card) 23'; Akbaba 47'; Belhanda (yellow card) 50'; B. Ndiaye (yellow card) 90+11'	Stadium: Cegeka Arena; Attendance: 9,460; Referee: António Nobre (Portugal)

31 August 2023 Second leg	Adana Demirspor (Turkey)	1–0 (a.e.t.) (2–2 agg.) (4–5 p)	(Belgium) Genk	Adana
21:00 UTC+3	C. Ndiaye (penalty missed) 45+10', 45+10'; Akbaba (yellow card) 64'; Belhanda (yellow card) 78'; Rodrigues (yellow card) 90+5'; Stambouli (yellow card) 120+2'	Report	Fadera (yellow card) 25'; Arokodare (yellow card) 90+1'	Stadium: New Adana Stadium; Attendance: 24,986; Referee: José Luis Munuera Montero (Spain)
	Penalties
	Niang (penalty scored); Stambouli (penalty scored); Belhanda (penalty missed); Sari (penalty scored); David (penalty scored)		(penalty scored) Heynen; (penalty scored) Bonsu Baah; (penalty scored) Ait El Hadj; (penalty scored) Ouattara; (penalty scored) Arokodare
