= Édouard Michut =

French footballer (born 2003)

- Michut in March 2026

Personal information
- Full name: Édouard Oscar Michut
- Date of birth: 4 March 2003 (age 23)
- Place of birth: Aix-les-Bains, France
- Height: 1.78 m (5 ft 10 in)
- Position: Midfielder

Team information
- Current team: Fortuna Sittard
- Number: 20

Youth career
- 2009–2011: FC Le Chesnay 78
- 2011–2015: Versailles
- 2016–2022: Paris Saint-Germain

Senior career*
Years	Team	Apps	(Gls)
2021–2024	Paris Saint-Germain	6	(0)
2022–2023	→ Sunderland (loan)	24	(1)
2023–2024	→ Adana Demirspor (loan)	10	(0)
2024	Adana Demirspor	16	(0)
2024–	Fortuna Sittard	48	(2)

International career
2019	France U16	2	(0)
2019–2020	France U17	3	(0)
2021–2022	France U19	9	(0)
2023–2024	France U20	7	(1)
- * Club domestic league appearances and goals as of 25 October 2026

Édouard Oscar Michut (born 4 March 2003) is a French professional footballer who plays as a midfielder for Eredivisie club Fortuna Sittard.

== Club career ==
=== Early career ===
Born in Aix-les-Bains in southeastern France, Michut played for FC Le Chesnay 78 from September 2009 to October 2011. He then signed for Versailles, which he stayed at until June 2015, before joining the academy of Paris Saint-Germain in July 2016. In his youth career, Michut was dubbed the "new Verratti" (and also by some as the "new Messi") in France due to his technical ability and tactical versatility; he attracted the attention of several major clubs, namely Manchester City, Juventus, Barcelona and Valencia.

=== Paris Saint-Germain ===
On 23 July 2020, Michut signed his first professional contract with Paris Saint-Germain (PSG), a deal lasting until 2023. He made his debut in a 4–0 Ligue 1 win over Dijon on 27 February 2021, coming on as a substitute for Danilo Pereira at the 89th minute of the match. On 18 June 2021, Michut extended his contract with PSG to 30 June 2025.

On 18 August 2021, Michut was sent back to train with the under-19 squad coached by Zoumana Camara. He made his first appearance of the 2021–22 season as a substitute in a 3–0 Coupe de France win over Feignies Aulnoye on 19 December, and made his first professional start in a 4–0 win over Vannes on 3 January 2022 in the same competition. On 9 January 2022, Michut made his first league appearance of the season, coming on as a substitute for Ander Herrera in a 1–1 draw away to Lyon. In the match, he recorded his first career assist, a pass for Thilo Kehrer's 76th-minute equalizer. At the age of 18 years and 311 days, he became the youngest player to contribute an assist for Paris Saint-Germain since Kylian Mbappé (18 years and 298 days) in a match against Dijon on 14 October 2017. On 20 April 2022, Michut received a red card in a 3–0 win over Angers. After having been tackled, he struck Romain Thomas's tibia "on accident" according to PSG manager Mauricio Pochettino. By participating in five league matches for Paris Saint-Germain in the 2021–22 season, Michut became a Ligue 1 champion.

On 6 July 2022, a meeting was scheduled at the Camp des Loges between Michut and Luís Campos, PSG's new Football Advisor, to discuss the player's future at the club. However, Michut did not show up to the meeting. He had not been named in the club's squad for the start of pre-season on 4 July, and had instead been placed in a separate session for youth players starting on 12 July. A new meeting between Michut and Campos occurred on 7 July, in which Campos gave Michut a warning due to his behavior. Before the end of the meeting, Michut was made to sign a paper acting as a call to order.

==== Loan to Sunderland ====
On 31 August 2022, Michut joined EFL Championship club Sunderland on a season-long loan deal, with the club holding an option to make the deal permanent at the end of the season. He scored his first goal for the club on 15 March 2023 in a 2–1 loss to Sheffield United. By the end of the season, Michut had made 28 appearances across all competitions. Although observers judged his overall season performance as a "success", Sunderland opted not to trigger the buy option in Michut's loan deal. Sporting director Kristjaan Speakman stated that "following a period of dialogue with the player and his representatives, all parties mutually agreed it was best to pursue other opportunities".

=== Adana Demirspor ===
On 15 September 2023, Michut joined Turkish club Adana Demirspor on loan. He made his debut for his new team in a Süper Lig match against Kayserispor on 26 November 2023.

On 24 January 2024, Adana Demirspor activated the buy option clause for Michut, signing him on a contract until 2027. PSG retained a 20% sell-on clause. He left the club on 21 August 2024.

=== Fortuna Sittard ===
On 5 November 2024, Michut joined Eredivisie club Fortuna Sittard.

== International career ==
Michut is a youth international for France, representing his nation at under-16, under-17, and under-19 level.

== Personal life ==
Michut's younger brother, Étienne, signed an “aspiring” youth contract with PSG in April 2021.

== Career statistics ==
As of 25 October 2026

Appearances and goals by club, season, and competition
Club	Season	League			National cup (Note: Includes Coupe de France, FA Cup, Turkish Cup, KNVB Cup)		Continental		Other		Total	
Club	Season	Division	Apps	Goals	Apps	Goals	Apps	Goals	Apps	Goals	Apps	Goals
Paris Saint-Germain	2020–21	Ligue 1	1	0	0	0	0	0	—		1	0
Paris Saint-Germain	2021–22	Ligue 1	5	0	2	0	0	0	0	0	7	0
Paris Saint-Germain	Total		6	0	2	0	0	0	0	0	8	0
Sunderland (loan)	2022–23	Championship	24	1	3	0	—		1 (Note: Appearance in Championship play-offs)	0	28	1
Adana Demirspor	2023–24 (Note: Part of the season was spent on loan from Paris Saint-Germain.)	Süper Lig	24	0	1	1	—		—		25	1
Adana Demirspor	2024–25	Süper Lig	2	0	—		—		—		2	0
Adana Demirspor	Total		26	0	1	1	—		—		27	1
Fortuna Sittard	2024–25	Eredivisie	18	1	1	0	—		—		19	1
Fortuna Sittard	2025–26	Eredivisie	20	0	1	0	—		—		21	0
Fortuna Sittard	2026–27	Eredivisie	10	1	0	0	—		—		10	1
Fortuna Sittard	Total		48	2	2	0	—		—		50	2
Career total			104	3	8	1	0	0	1	0	113	4

== Honours ==
Paris Saint-Germain

- Ligue 1: 2021–22
