= Andreaw Gravillon =

Guadeloupean footballer (born 1998)

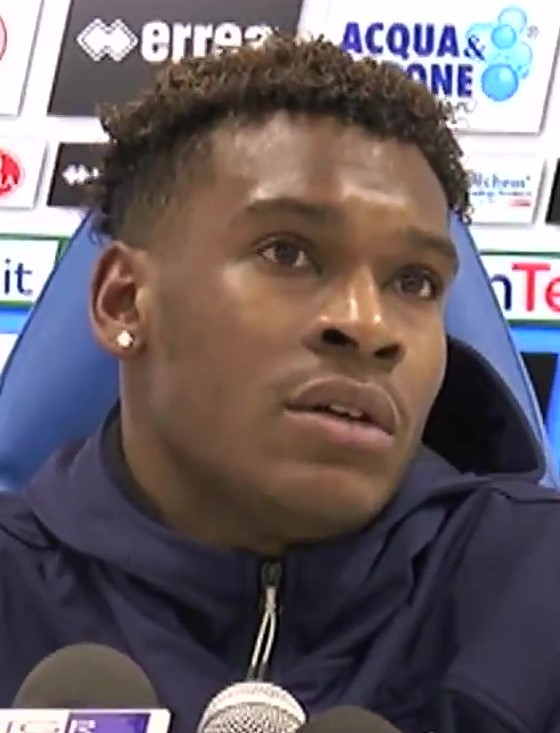
- Gravillon in 2018

Personal information
- Full name: Andreaw Rayan Gravillon
- Date of birth: 8 February 1998 (age 28)
- Place of birth: Pointe-à-Pitre, Guadeloupe
- Height: 1.88 m (6 ft 2 in)
- Position: Centre-back

Team information
- Current team: Neftçi
- Number: 55

Youth career
- Créteil
- FCM Garges-lès-Gonesse
- 2014–2017: Inter Milan

Senior career*
Years	Team	Apps	(Gls)
2016–2017	Inter Milan	0	(0)
2017–2018	Benevento	2	(0)
2018–2019	Pescara	29	(2)
2019–2022	Inter Milan	0	(0)
2019	→ Pescara (loan)	9	(0)
2019	→ Sassuolo (loan)	0	(0)
2019–2020	→ Ascoli (loan)	29	(0)
2020–2021	→ Lorient (loan)	26	(1)
2021–2022	→ Reims (loan)	26	(0)
2022–2023	Reims	13	(0)
2023	→ Torino (loan)	7	(0)
2023–2025	Adana Demirspor	41	(4)
2025–2026	Pescara	24	(0)
2026–	Neftçi	0	(0)

International career^{‡}
2021–	Guadeloupe	15	(2)
- * Club domestic league appearances and goals as of 24 June2026 ‡ National team caps and goals as of 23:58, 23 December 2023 (UTC)

Andreaw Rayan Gravillon (born 8 February 1998) is a Guadeloupean professional footballer who plays as a centre-back for Azerbaijan Premier League club Neftçi and the Guadeloupe national team.

== Club career ==
=== Inter Milan ===
On 14 May 2017, Gravillon received his first call-up for the first team from Stefano Vecchi in a match against Sassuolo, but he was an unused substitute of a 2–1 home defeat. On 27 May, he received his second call-up, but, again, he stayed on the bench, in a 5–2 home win over Udinese.

=== Benevento ===
On 1 July 2017, Gravillon signed for the newly promoted Serie A team Benevento on a four-year contract while Internazionale was paid a €1.5 million fee. On 24 September, he made his Serie A debut for Benevento in a game against Crotone in a 2–0 away defeat, he was replaced by Gaetano Letizia in the 63rd minute.

=== Return to Inter Milan ===
On 29 January 2019, Gravillon rejoined Internazionale. He stayed at Pescara on loan for the remainder of the 2018–19 season. On 17 July 2019, Gravillon moved to Sassuolo on loan with an option of a permanent deal. On 2 September 2019, he was sent on a different loan, to Serie B club Ascoli. On 25 September 2020, he joined Ligue 1 club FC Lorient on loan with an option to buy.

=== Reims ===
On 13 July 2021, he joined Reims on loan for the 2021–22 season.

On 22 December 2021, Gravillon made his 17th league appearance with the club in a 1–1 draw against Marseille, triggering the obligation to buy clause and signing a permanent contract with Reims until June 2025, as confirmed by the chairman of the club Jean-Pierre Caillot on 26 December 2021.

==== Loan to Torino ====
On 31 January 2023, Gravillon returned to Italy and joined Torino on loan with an option to buy.

=== Adana Demirspor ===
On 24 July 2023, he signed a three-year contract with Süper Lig club Adana Demirspor.

== International career ==
In June 2021 he was called up for the Guadeloupe senior preliminary roster for the 2021 CONCACAF Gold Cup qualification. He debuted almost one year later on 2 June 2022 in a 2–1 win against Cuba.

== Career statistics ==
=== Club ===
As of match played 6 October 2024

Appearances and goals by club, season and competition
Club	Season	League	League		National cup (Note: Includes Coppa Italia, Coupe de France, Turkish Cup)		Europe		Total	
Club	Season	League	Apps	Goals	Apps	Goals	Apps	Goals	Apps	Goals
Benevento	2017–18	Serie A	2	0	0	0	–		2	0
Pescara	2017–18	Serie B	9	0	–		–		9	0
Pescara	2018–19	Serie B	20	2	2	0	–		22	2
Pescara	Total		29	2	2	0	–		31	2
Pescara (loan)	2018–19	Serie B	9	0	0	0	–		9	0
Sassuolo (loan)	2019–20	Serie A	0	0	1	0	–		1	0
Ascoli (loan)	2019–20	Serie B	29	0	0	0	–		29	0
Lorient (loan)	2020–21	Ligue 1	26	1	0	0	–		26	1
Reims (loan)	2021–22	Ligue 1	26	0	1	0	–		27	0
Reims	2022–23	Ligue 1	13	0	2	0	–		15	0
Torino (loan)	2022–23	Serie A	7	0	0	0	–		7	0
Adana Demirspor	2023–24	Süper Lig	33	2	1	0	5 (Note: Appearances in UEFA Europa Conference League)	0	39	2
Adana Demirspor	2024–25	Süper Lig	8	2	0	0	–		8	2
Adana Demirspor	Total		41	4	1	0	5	0	47	4
Career total			182	7	7	0	5	0	194	7

=== International ===
Scores and results list Guadeloupe's goal tally first.

List of international goals scored by Andreaw Gravillon
No.	Date	Venue	Opponent	Score	Result	Competition
1	20 June 2023	DRV PNK Stadium, Fort Lauderdale, United States	Guyana	2–0	2–0	2023 CONCACAF Gold Cup qualification
2	4 July 2023	Red Bull Arena, Harrison, United States	Guatemala	1–0	2–3	2023 CONCACAF Gold Cup
