= Ozan Demirbağ =

Turkish footballer (born 2008)

Personal information
- Date of birth: 12 February 2008 (age 18)
- Place of birth: Tokat, Turkey
- Height: 1.78 m (5 ft 10 in)
- Position: Winger

Team information
- Current team: Yozgat Belediyesi Bozokspor (on loan from Pendikspor)
- Number: 7

Youth career
- 2017–2019: Izmir Güçlü Spor
- 2019–2022: Altay
- 2022: Canlı Spor
- 2022–2023: Bucaspor 1928
- 2023–2024: Adana Demirspor

Senior career*
Years	Team	Apps	(Gls)
2024–2025	Adana Demirspor	37	(2)
2025–	Pendikspor	0	(0)
2026	→ Erciyes 38 FSK (loan)	5	(0)
2026–	→ Yozgat Belediyesi Bozokspor (loan)	11	(1)

International career^{‡}
2023–2024	Turkey U16	5	(4)
2024–2025	Turkey U17	9	(0)
2025–2026	Turkey U18	5	(0)
2026–	Turkey U18	3	(1)
- * Club domestic league appearances and goals as of 11 November 2026 ‡ National team caps and goals as of 30 March 2026

Ozan Demirbağ (born 12 February 2008) is a Turkish professional footballer who plays as a winger for TFF 3. Lig club Yozgat Belediyesi Bozokspor on loan from Pendikspor.

== Club career ==
On 3 February 2024, Demirbag signed his first professional contract with Adana Demirspor until June 2026. One day later, he made his professional debut in the team's 2–1 Süper Lig defeat against Pendikspor, making the first 2008 born to appear in the league.

== International career ==
Demirbag is a youth international for the Turkey, represented the Turkey under-16s.

== Career statistics ==
=== Club ===
As of 12 February 2024.

Appearances and goals by club, season and competition
Club	Season	League			Cup		Continental		Other		Total	
Club	Season	Division	Apps	Goals	Apps	Goals	Apps	Goals	Apps	Goals	Apps	Goals
Adana Demirspor	2023–24	Süper Lig	1	0	0	0	–		0	0	1	0
Career total			1	0	0	0	0	0	0	0	1	0
