= Semih Güler =

German footballer (born 1994)

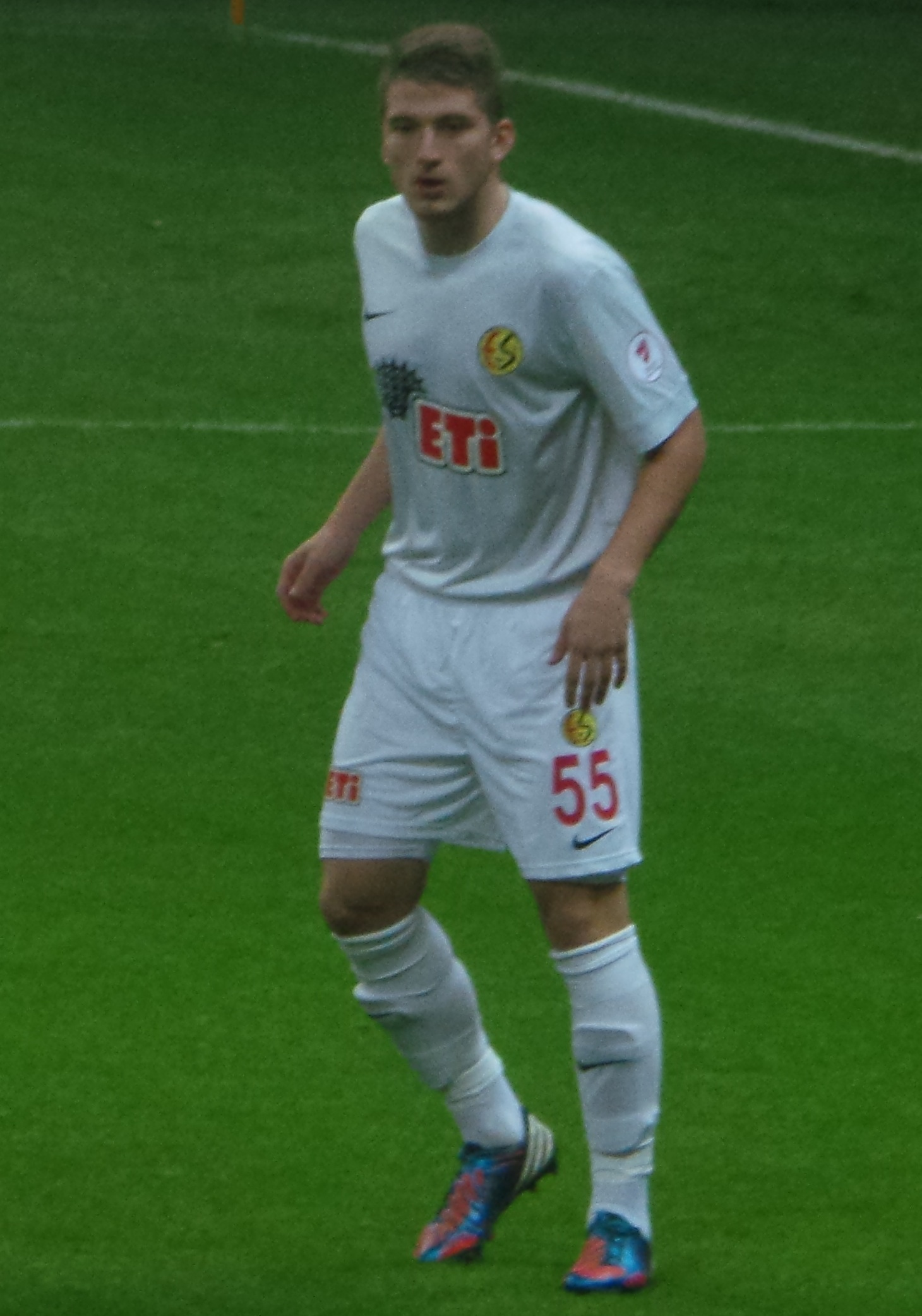
- Güler playing for Eskişehirspor in 2014

Personal information
- Date of birth: 30 November 1994 (age 31)
- Place of birth: Castrop-Rauxel, Germany
- Height: 1.84 m (6 ft 0 in)
- Position: Centre-back

Team information
- Current team: Kayserispor
- Number: 6

Youth career
- SF Nette
- Blau-Gelb Schwerin
- –2010: Eintracht Dortmund
- 2010–2012: Westfalia Herne

Senior career*
| Years | Team | Apps | (Gls) |
| 2013–2014 | Westfalia Herne | 45 | (2) |
| 2014–2019 | Eskişehirspor | 45 | (0) |
| 2015–2017 | → Eyüpspor (loan) | 53 | (1) |
| 2019–2025 | Adana Demirspor | 124 | (3) |
| 2024–2026 | Gaziantep | 27 | (1) |
| 2026- | Kayserispor | 17 | (0) |
| Total | | 295 | (7) |
- * Club domestic league appearances and goals as of 10 June 2026

Semih Güler (born 30 November 1994) is a German professional footballer who plays as a centre-back for TFF 1. Lig side Kayserispor.

== Career ==
Güler began his senior career with the German club Westfalia Herne in 2013. In the summer of 2014, he transferred to Eskişehirspor. He made his professional debut with Eskişehirspor in a 4–2 Turkish Cup loss to Galatasaray 3 December 2014. He shortly after went on loan to Eyüpspor for two seasons before returning to Eskişehirspor as a starter. On 13 January 2019, he transferred to Adana Demirspor. On 2 February 2025, he joined Gaziantep.

== Personal life ==
Born in Germany, Güler is of Turkish descent.

== Career statistics ==
As of match played 26 April 2024

Appearances and goals by club, season and competition
| Club | Season | League | | | Cup | | Europe | | Other | | Total | |
| Club | Season | Division | Apps | Goals | Apps | Goals | Apps | Goals | Apps | Goals | Apps | Goals |
|---|---|---|---|---|---|---|---|---|---|---|---|---|
| Eskişehirspor | 2014–15 | Süper Lig | 1 | 0 | 2 | 0 | — | | — | | 3 | 0 |
| Eskişehirspor | 2017–18 | 1. Lig | 27 | 0 | 0 | 0 | — | | — | | 27 | 0 |
| Eskişehirspor | 2018–19 | 1. Lig | 17 | 0 | 0 | 0 | — | | — | | 17 | 0 |
| Eskişehirspor | Total | | 45 | 0 | 2 | 0 | — | | — | | 47 | 0 |
| Eyüpspor (loan) | 2015–16 | 2. Lig | 25 | 0 | 0 | 0 | — | | — | | 25 | 0 |
| Eyüpspor (loan) | 2016–17 | 2. Lig | 28 | 1 | 1 | 0 | — | | — | | 29 | 1 |
| Eyüpspor (loan) | Total | | 53 | 1 | 1 | 0 | — | | — | | 54 | 1 |
| Adana Demirspor | 2018–19 | 1. Lig | 14 | 0 | — | | — | | 2 | 0 | 16 | 0 |
| Adana Demirspor | 2019–20 | 1. Lig | 18 | 0 | 0 | 0 | — | | — | | 18 | 0 |
| Adana Demirspor | 2020–21 | 1. Lig | 13 | 1 | 4 | 0 | — | | — | | 17 | 1 |
| Adana Demirspor | 2021–22 | Süper Lig | 12 | 0 | 4 | 0 | — | | — | | 16 | 0 |
| Adana Demirspor | 2022–23 | Süper Lig | 30 | 0 | 3 | 0 | — | | — | | 33 | 0 |
| Adana Demirspor | 2023–24 | Süper Lig | 32 | 0 | 0 | 0 | 6 | 0 | — | | 38 | 0 |
| Adana Demirspor | Total | | 119 | 1 | 11 | 0 | 6 | 0 | 2 | 0 | 138 | 1 |
| Career total | | | 217 | 2 | 14 | 0 | 6 | 0 | 2 | 0 | 239 | 2 |

== Honours ==
Adana Demirspor

- TFF 1. Lig: 2020–21
