= Mirza Cihan =

Turkish footballer

Personal information
- Date of birth: 26 October 2000 (age 26)
- Place of birth: Denizli, Turkey
- Height: 1.75 m (5 ft 9 in)
- Position: Winger

Team information
- Current team: Gaziantep
- Number: 11

Youth career
- 2011–2016: Oğuzspor
- 2016–2017: Gaziantep
- 2018–2020: Galatasaray

Senior career*
Years	Team	Apps	(Gls)
2017–2018	Gaziantep	1	(0)
2020–	Gaziantep	42	(0)
2023	→ İstanbulspor (loan)	0	(0)
2025	→ Adanaspor (loan)	11	(0)
2025–2026	→ Sakaryaspor (loan)	14	(0)
- * Club domestic league appearances and goals as of 11 October 2026

Mirza Cihan (born 26 October 2000) is a Turkish professional footballer who plays as a winger for Süper Lig club Gaziantep.

== Professional career ==
A youth product of Gaziantep, Cihan was promoted to the first team in 2017 and debuted in the TFF First League in 2017. He transferred to Galatasaray where he stayed from 2018 to 2020, before returning to Gaziantep on 20 September 2020. Cihan made his professional debut with Gaziantep in a 2–0 Süper Lig win over Başakşehir on 8 April 2021.
