= Motez Nourani =

Tunisian footballer

Personal information
- Date of birth: 11 January 2002 (age 24)
- Place of birth: Sousse, Tunisia
- Height: 1.78 m (5 ft 10 in)
- Position: Winger

Youth career
- ES Hammam Sousse
- Ittihad Al Shorta

Senior career*
Years	Team	Apps	(Gls)
2023–2024	US Tataouine	9	(0)
2024–2025	Adana Demirspor	7	(0)
2025–2026	Nacional	6	(0)
2026	→ CA Bizertin (loan)	5	(0)
- * Club domestic league appearances and goals as of 30 August 2026

Motez Nourani (Arabic: معتز نوراني, born 11 January 2002) is a Tunisian footballer who plays as a winger.

== Club career ==
Nourani is a product of the academy of the Tunisian club ES Hammam Sousse and Libyan club Ittihad Al Shorta. He joined Ittihad Tataouine in the Tunisian Ligue Professionnelle 1. On 15 January 2024, he transferred to the Süper Lig club Adana Demirspor. His move to Adana Demirspor was the subject of financial dispute between the two clubs.

On 2 July 2025, Nourani transferred to Primeira Liga club Nacional on a contract until 2028. On 2 February 2026, he joined CA Bizertin on loan for the second half of the 2025–26 season. On 2 September 2026, his contract with Nacional was mutually terminated.
