= Tayfun Aydoğan =

Turkish footballer (born 1996)

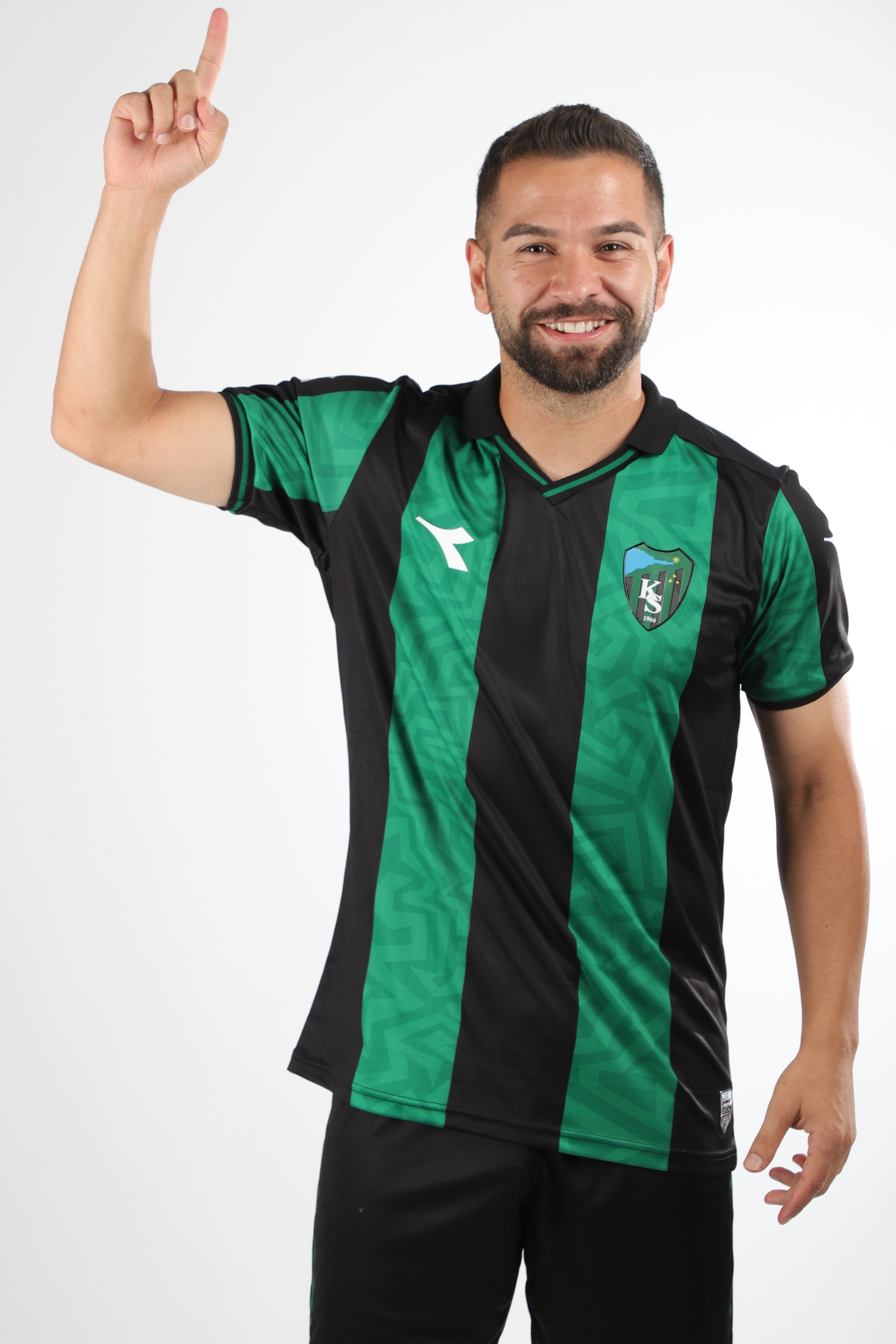
- Aydoğan with Kocaelispor in 2022

Personal information
- Date of birth: 29 May 1996 (age 30)
- Place of birth: Kadıköy, Türkiye
- Height: 1.75 m (5 ft 9 in)
- Position: Midfielder

Team information
- Current team: Bursaspor
- Number: 52

Youth career
- 2005–2008: Beşiktaş
- 2008–2009: Dikilitaş Spor
- 2009–2015: Beşiktaş

Senior career*
Years	Team	Apps	(Gls)
2015–2021	Menemen	132	(14)
2018	→ Vanspor (loan)	13	(3)
2021–2022	Adana Demirspor	0	(0)
2021–2022	→ Tuzlaspor (loan)	29	(3)
2022–2023	Kocaelispor	34	(11)
2023–2025	Adana Demirspor	51	(3)
2025–	Bursaspor	6	(2)

International career
2011	Turkey U15	2	(0)
2012	Turkey U16	4	(0)
2013–2014	Turkey U18	3	(1)
- * Club domestic league appearances and goals as of 28 September 2025

Tayfun Aydoğan (born 29 May 1996) is a Turkish professional footballer who plays as a midfielder for TFF 1. Lig club Bursaspor.

== Career ==
Aydoğan is a youth product of the academies of Beşiktaş and Dikilitaş Spor. He began his senior career with Menemen in 2015, while they were in the TFF Third League. He spent the second half of the 2017–18 season with Vanspor. Returning to Menemen, he eventually helped them with 2 promotions ending up in the TFF Third League, and in total played 132 matches and scored 14 goals with the club where he finished as captain.

On 10 July 2021, Aydoğan moved to Adana Demirspor as they were newly promoted to the Süper Lig on a 2-year contract. He immediately joined Tuzlaspor for the 2022–23 season in the TFF First League. On 3 August 2022, he joined on a free transfer to Kocaelispor as a sign of friendship from Adana Demirspor, signing a 3-year contract. He helped Kocaelispor win the 2022–23 TFF Second League, and returned to Adana Demirspor in the Süper Lig on 4 July 2023. On 1 October 2023, he scored his first Süper Lig goal in a 4–0 win over Alanyaspor.

== International career ==
Aydoğan is a youth international for Turkey, having played up to the Turkey U18s.

== Honours ==
Menemen

- TFF Second League: 2018–19
- TSYD Cup: 2019

Kocaelispor

- TFF Second League: 2022–23
