= Maestro (footballer) =

Angolan footballer (born 2003)

Personal information
- Full name: António Simão Muanza
- Date of birth: 4 August 2003 (age 23)
- Place of birth: Luanda, Angola
- Height: 1.73 m (5 ft 8 in)
- Position: Midfielder

Team information
- Current team: Alanyaspor
- Number: 58

Youth career
- Guelson FC
- 2018–2022: Academia de Futebol de Angola

Senior career*
Years	Team	Apps	(Gls)
2022	Estrela da Amadora	9	(0)
2022–2024	Benfica B	26	(3)
2024–2025	Adana Demirspor	46	(1)
2025–	Alanyaspor	26	(1)

International career^{‡}
2019	Angola U17	7	(0)
2020	Angola U20	1	(0)
2023–	Angola	29	(1)
Medal record
Men's football
Representing Angola
COSAFA Cup
Winner	2024 South Africa
COSAFA U-20 Challenge Cup
Third place	2020 South Africa
Africa U-17 Cup of Nations
Third place	2019 Tanzania
- * Club domestic league appearances and goals as of 8 November 2026 ‡ National team caps and goals as of 17 November 2026

António Simão Muanza (born 4 August 2003), commonly known as Maestro, is an Angolan professional footballer who plays as a midfielder for Süper Lig club Alanyaspor and the Angola national team.

== Club career ==
Maestro is a product of Academia de Futebol de Angola. He joined Portuguese club Estrela da Amadora in January 2022. He made his professional debut on 18 January 2022 in a 2–2 draw against Mafra.

In July 2022, he joined Benfica B on a four-year deal until 2026. With Benfica B, he made his debut as a substitute against Nacional in a 2–0 away loss.

On 9 February 2024, Maestro moved to Turkey, joining Süper Lig club Adana Demirspor, where he signed a two-and-a-half-year contract, with an option for a further year. On 18 February 2024, he made his Süper Lig debut against Alanyaspor in a 3–3 away draw. On 3 December 2024, he made his Turkish Cup debut against Sebat Gençlik, a 4–3 home win.

On 3 July 2025, he joined fellow Turkish club Alanyaspor on a four-year deal. On 16 August 2025, he debut with the team against Çaykur Rizespor in a Süper Lig match, 0–0 home draw.

== International career ==
As a youth international, Maestro has represented Angola at the 2019 Africa U-17 Cup of Nations, 2020 COSAFA U-20 Cup and the 2019 FIFA U-17 World Cup.

In September 2023, Maestro was called up to the Angola senior national team. On 1 July 2024, he scored his first international goal in a 3–2 win against Seychelles. He was part of the Angola team which won the 2024 COSAFA Cup.

On 3 December 2025, Maestro was called up to the Angola squad for the 2025 Africa Cup of Nations.

== Career statistics ==
=== Club ===
As of 12 December 2025

Appearances and goals by club, season and competition
Club	Season	League			National cup (Note: Includes Turkish Cup)		Continental		Other		Total	
Club	Season	Division	Apps	Goals	Apps	Goals	Apps	Goals	Apps	Goals	Goals	Apps
Estrela	2021–22	Liga Portugal 2	9	0	—		—		—		9	0
Benfica B	2022–23	Liga Portugal 2	17	0	—		—		—		17	0
Benfica B	2023–24	Liga Portugal 2	9	3	—		—		—		9	3
Benfica B	Total		26	3	0	0	0	0	0	0	26	3
Adana Demirspor	2023–24	Süper Lig	13	0	—		—		—		13	0
Adana Demirspor	2024–25	Süper Lig	33	1	1	0	—		—		33	1
Adana Demirspor	Total		46	1	1	0	0	0	0	0	46	1
Alanyaspor	2025–26	Süper Lig	13	1	1	0	—		—		14	1
Career total			81	5	2	0	0	0	0	0	83	5

=== International ===
As of match played 17 November 2026

Appearances and goals by national team and year
National team	Year	Apps	Goals
Angola	2023	2	0
Angola	2024	13	1
Angola	2025	11	0
Angola	2026	3	0
Total		29	1

Scores and results list Angola's goal tally first, score column indicates score after each Maestro goal.

List of international goals scored by Maestro
No.	Date	Venue	Opponent	Score	Result	Competition
1	1 July 2024	Isaac Wolfson Stadium, Gqeberha, South Africa	Seychelles	3–2	3–2	2024 COSAFA Cup

== Honours ==
Angola

- COSAFA Cup: 2024

Individual

- COSAFA Cup best player: 2024
