= Arda Kılıç =

Turkish footballer (born 2005)

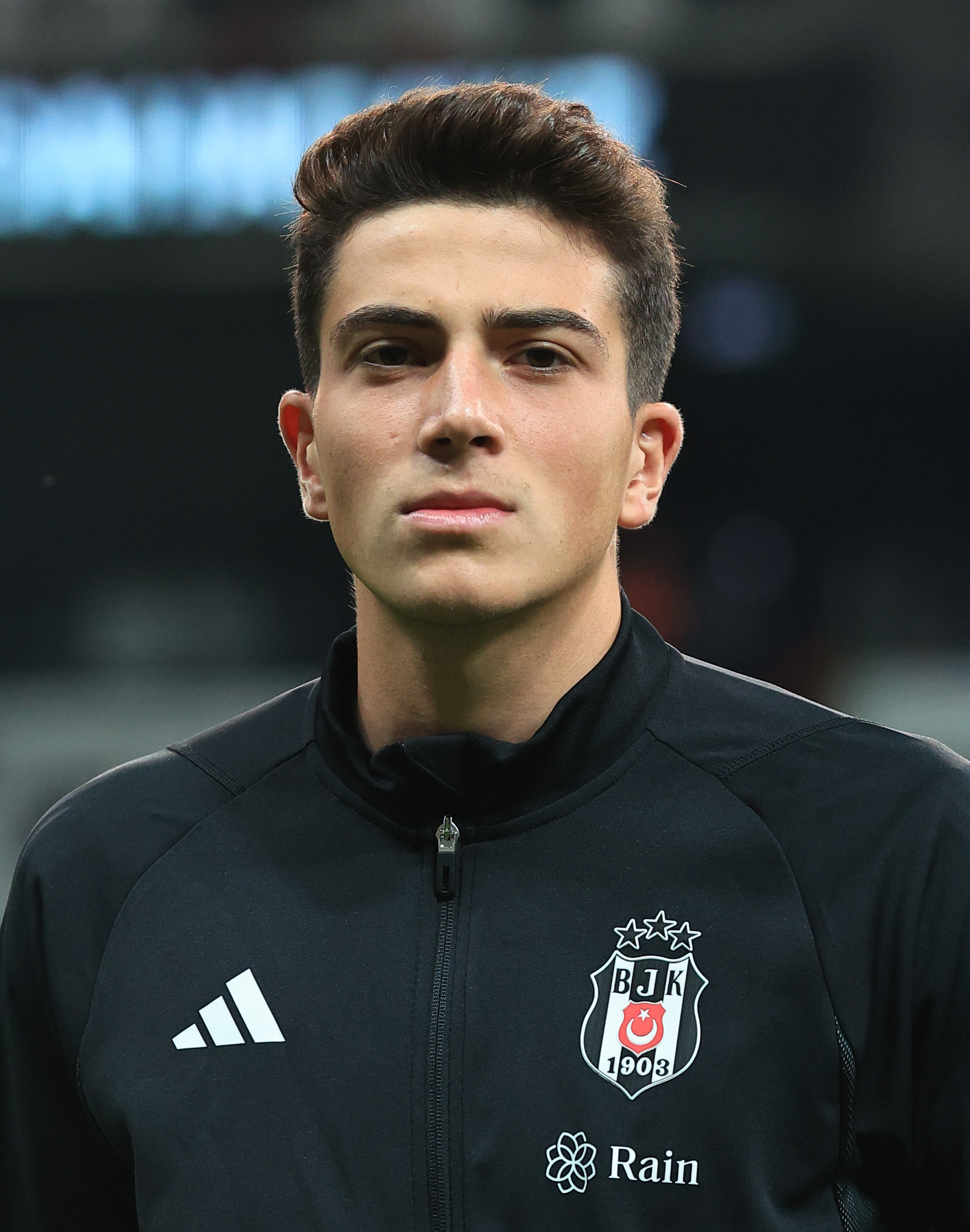
- Kılıç in 2023

Personal information
- Full name: Yakup Arda Kılıç
- Date of birth: 4 January 2005 (age 21)
- Place of birth: Üsküdar, Türkiye
- Height: 1.79 m (5 ft 10 in)
- Position: Winger

Team information
- Current team: Kırklarelispor

Youth career
- 2014–2015: Dikilitaş Spor
- 2015–2017: Beşiktaş
- 2017: Dikilitaş Spor
- 2017–2023: Beşiktaş

Senior career*
Years	Team	Apps	(Gls)
2023–2026	Beşiktaş	3	(0)
2025–2026	→ Novi Pazar (loan)	2	(0)
2026	→ Karşıyaka (loan)	7	(1)
2026–	Kırklarelispor	0	(0)
- * Club domestic league appearances and goals as of 22:08, 4 September 2026 (UTC)

Yakup Arda Kılıç (born 4 January 2005) is a Turkish professional footballer who plays as a winger for TFF Second League club Kırklarelispor.

== Club career ==
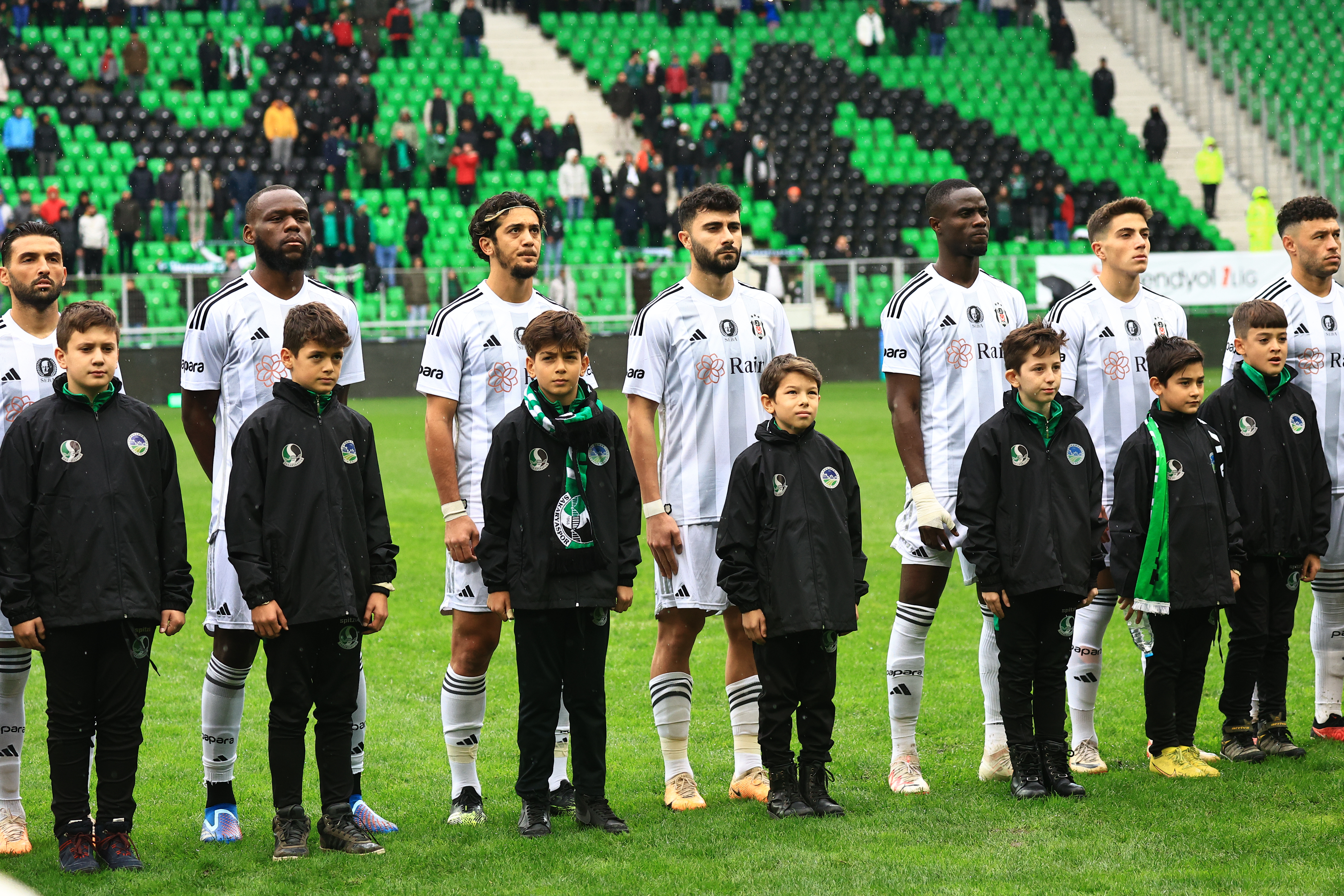
Kılıç with Beşiktaş in 2023

=== Beşiktaş ===
Kılıç is a youth product of Dikilitaş Spor and Süper Lig Beşiktaş. On 25 October 2023, he signed his first professional contract with Beşiktaş until 2027. He was called up to the senior squad for the first time for a UEFA Europa Conference League match against Bodø/Glimt. He made his senior and professional debut with Beşiktaş in a 2–0 Süper Lig win over Gaziantep FK on 30 October 2023.

=== Novi Pazar ===
On 7 August 2025, Kılıç moved to Serbian SuperLiga club Novi Pazar on a one-year loan deal.

=== Karşıyaka ===
On 7 January 2026, Kılıç was loaned to Karşıyaka until the end of the season.

=== Kırklarelispor ===
On 4 September 2026, Kılıç transferred to TFF Second League club Kırklarelispor permanently.

== Honours ==
Beşiktaş

- Turkish Cup: 2023–24
- Turkish Super Cup: 2024
