= Thalisson =

Brazilian footballer

Personal information
- Full name: Thalisson Kelven da Silva
- Date of birth: 7 May 1998 (age 28)
- Place of birth: Ji-Paraná, Brazil
- Height: 1.84 m (6 ft 0 in)
- Position: Centre back

Team information
- Current team: Gençlerbirliği
- Number: 2

Youth career
- 2012–2017: Coritiba

Senior career*
Years	Team	Apps	(Gls)
2017–2021	Coritiba	27	(1)
2019	→ Guarani (loan)	0	(0)
2020	→ CRB (loan)	6	(0)
2021	→ Inter de Limeira (loan)	0	(0)
2021	Vitória	14	(1)
2022–2023	Mirassol	27	(3)
2022	→ Juventude (loan)	25	(0)
2024	Universitatea Cluj	16	(0)
2024–2025	Antalyaspor	33	(2)
2025–	Gençlerbirliği	29	(2)
- * Club domestic league appearances and goals as of 10 June 2026

Thalisson Kelven da Silva (born 7 May 1998) is a Brazilian professional footballer who plays as a centre back for Süper Lig club Gençlerbirliği.

== Career ==
Thalisson started his career in Coritiba's youth system. His professional debut came on 16 July 2017 against Fluminense in the Brasileirão. On 3 August 2017 he made his first start against São Paulo.

== Honours ==
Coritiba

- Campeonato Paranaense: 2017

CRB

- Campeonato Alagoano: 2020
