= Deniz Dönmezer =

Turkish footballer (born 2008)

Personal information
- Full name: Deniz Eren Dönmezer
- Date of birth: 21 September 2008 (age 18)
- Place of birth: Hatay, Turkey
- Height: 1.90 m (6 ft 3 in)
- Position: Goalkeeper

Team information
- Current team: Kayserispor
- Number: 27

Youth career
- 2017–2019: Çukurova Demirspor
- 2019–2024: Adana Demirspor

Senior career*
Years	Team	Apps	(Gls)
2024–2025	Adana Demirspor	23	(0)
2025–	Kayserispor	2	(0)

International career^{‡}
2022	Turkey U14	1	(0)
2022	Turkey U15	2	(0)
2023–2024	Turkey U16	5	(0)
2025–	Turkey U17	2	(0)
2025–	Turkey U19	2	(0)
- * Club domestic league appearances and goals as of 10 June 2026 ‡ National team caps and goals as of 14 October 2025

Deniz Eren Dönmezer (born 21 September 2008) is a Turkish professional footballer who plays as a goalkeeper for TFF 1. Lig club Kayserispor.

== Career ==
He started his career with Turkish side Adana Demirspor. On 17 May 2024, he debuted for the club during a 1–2 loss to Alanyaspor.

== Style of play ==
He operates as a goalkeeper. He is right-footed.
