= İzzet Çelik =

Turkish footballer

Personal information
- Date of birth: 20 June 2004 (age 22)
- Place of birth: Yüreğir, Turkey
- Height: 1.66 m (5 ft 5 in)
- Position: Winger

Team information
- Current team: Alanyaspor
- Number: 6

Youth career
- 2013–2019: Adana Gençlerbirliği
- 2019–2020: Adana Demirspor

Senior career*
| Years | Team | Apps | (Gls) |
| 2020–2025 | Adana Demirspor | 33 | (0) |
| 2022 | → Diyarbakırspor (loan) | 11 | (0) |
| 2022–2023 | → Bayrampaşa (loan) | 26 | (0) |
| 2025– | Alanyaspor | 13 | (0) |

International career^{‡}
| 2024 | Turkey U20 | 1 | (0) |
| 2025 | Turkey U21 | 7 | (1) |
- * Club domestic league appearances and goals as of 10 June 2026 ‡ National team caps and goals as of 14 October 2025

İzzet Çelik (born 20 June 2004) is a Turkish professional footballer who plays as a winger for Alanyaspor.

== Career ==
A youth product of Adana Gençlerbirliği and Adana Demirspor, Çelik signed his first professional contract with Adana Demirspor on 10 September 2020. He began his senior career with the team in 2020 at the age of 16. He made his professional debut with Adana Demirspor in a 4–0 Süper Lig win over Gaziantep on 25 September 2021. On 22 January 2022, he moved to Diyarbakırspor for the second half of the 2021–22 season. He moved to Bayrampaşa on loan for the 2022–23 season.

On 13 November 2025, Çelik was banned from playing for 3 months for his involvement in the 2025 Turkish football betting scandal.

== International career ==
Çelik was called up to a training camp for the Turkey U17s on 18 June 2021. In November 2025, Çelik was removed from the Turkey U21 squad due to his suspected involvement in the 2025 Turkish football betting scandal.

== Honours ==
Adana Demirspor

- TFF First League: 2020–21
