= Yusuf Barası =

Dutch footballer (born 2003)

Personal information
- Date of birth: 31 March 2003 (age 23)
- Place of birth: Alkmaar, Netherlands
- Height: 1.82 m (6 ft 0 in)
- Position: Forward

Team information
- Current team: Eyüpspor (on loan from Kasımpaşa)
- Number: 9

Youth career
- VV Kolping Boys
- 2014–2020: AZ Alkmaar

Senior career*
Years	Team	Apps	(Gls)
2020–2023	Jong AZ	59	(21)
2021–2023	AZ	14	(0)
2023–2025	Adana Demirspor	58	(12)
2025–	Kasımpaşa	8	(0)
2026–	→ Eyüpspor (loan)	8	(0)

International career^{‡}
2017–2018	Netherlands U15	4	(0)
2018	Netherlands U16	1	(1)
2019–2020	Netherlands U17	8	(5)
2020–2023	Turkey U21	9	(1)
- * Club domestic league appearances and goals as of 17 October 2026 ‡ National team caps and goals as of 27 March 2023

Yusuf Barası (born 31 March 2003) is a footballer who plays as a forward for Turkish Süper Lig club Eyüpspor on loan from Kasımpaşa. Born in the Netherlands, Barası represents Turkey internationally.

== Club career ==
On 26 August 2023, Barası moved to Adana Demirspor in Turkey.

== International career ==
Born in the Netherlands, Barası is of Turkish descent. He is a youth international for the Netherlands. Barası switched to represent the Turkey U21s, and debuted with them in a 3–0 win over Kosovo U21 on 17 November 2020.

== Career statistics ==
=== Club ===
As of 29 February 2020.

Appearances and goals by club, season and competition
Club	Season	League			Cup		Continental		Other		Total	
Club	Season	Division	Apps	Goals	Apps	Goals	Apps	Goals	Apps	Goals	Apps	Goals
Jong AZ	2019–20	Eerste Divisie	1	0	0	0	–		0	0	1	0
Career total			1	0	0	0	0	0	0	0	1	0
