= Arda Okan Kurtulan =

Albanian footballer

Personal information
- Date of birth: 19 November 2002 (age 23)
- Place of birth: Istanbul, Turkey
- Height: 1.83 m (6 ft 0 in)
- Position: Winger

Team information
- Current team: Göztepe
- Number: 2

Youth career
- 2014–2015: Akşemsettin Parsellerspor
- 2015–2016: Göktürk Sarayspor
- 2016–2017: Akşemsettin Parsellerspor
- 2017–2019: Erokspor
- 2019–2022: Fenerbahçe
- 2022–2023: Adana Demirspor

Senior career*
Years	Team	Apps	(Gls)
2022	Fenerbahçe	1	(0)
2022–2025	Adana Demirspor	27	(1)
2023	→ Karacabey Belediyespor (loan)	14	(3)
2023–2024	→ Diyarbekirspor (loan)	32	(8)
2025–	Göztepe	37	(5)

International career
2020–2021	North Macedonia U19	7	(0)
2022	North Macedonia U21	4	(2)
2022–2024	Albania U21	12	(2)
- * Club domestic league appearances and goals as of 17:14, 12 October 2026 (UTC)

Arda Okan Kurtulan (born 19 November 2002) is a professional footballer who plays as a winger for Süper Lig club Göztepe. Born in Turkey, he is a former youth international for North Macedonia and Albania.

== Club career ==
Kurtulan was a youth product of Akşemsettin Parsellerspor in 2014. He then had a stint with Göktürk Sarayspor in 2015, before returning to his first club. He moved to Erokspor's youth academy in 2017, and then joined Fenerbahçe's youth side in 2019. On 17 May 2021, he signed his first professional contract with Fenerbahçe for three years. He made his professional debut with Fener as a late substitute in a 5–0 Süper Lig win over Yeni Malatyaspor on 21 May 2022.

== International career ==
Born and raised in Turkey, Kurtulan is of Albanian descent through his grandparents, respectively from Breza (grandfather), and Mitrovica (grandmother). He was eligible to represent four countries at international level, either Albania, Kosovo, Turkey or North Macedonia with the latter he was part of the U19 and U21 teams and with these teams he played eleven matches and scored two goals.

On 10 November 2022, Kurtulan decided to represent Albania U21 and accept their call-up for the friendly matches against San Marino and Montenegro. His debut with Albania U21 came ten days after call-up in a friendly match against Montenegro after coming on as a substitute in the 81st minute in place of Behar Ismaili.

== Personal life ==
Kurtulan's father, Ramazan Kurtulan, was a semi-professional footballer who played in the TFF First League.
