= 2020–21 Adana Demirspor season =

Adana Demirspor
2020–21 season
- Chairman: Murat Sancak
- Manager: Ümit Özat (until 13 December); Cüneyt Dumlupınar (from 15 December to 19 February); Samet Aybaba (from 22 February)
- Stadium: Adana 5 Ocak Stadium; New Adana Stadium
- TFF First League: 1st (promoted)
- Turkish Cup: Round of 16
- Top goalscorer: League: Hasan Kılıç (12); All: Hasan Kılıç (12)

The 2020–21 season was Adana Demirspor's 81st season in existence and third consecutive in the TFF First League, the second tier of Turkish football. They also competed in the Turkish Cup. Adana Demirspor achieved promotion.

== Transfers ==
=== In ===
Pos.	Player	Transferred from	Fee	Date	Source
MF	(Turkey) Samed Kaya	(Turkey) Göztepe		17 August 2020	
MF	(Turkey) Sedat Şahintürk	(Turkey) Beşiktaş	Free	17 August 2020	
FW	(Italy) Davide Lanzafame	(Hungary) Honvéd		26 August 2020	
DF	(Turkey) Anıl Karaer	(Turkey) Bursaspor	Free	26 August 2020	
GK	(Lithuania) Emilijus Zubas	(Israel) Bnei Yehuda	Free	26 August 2020	
MF	(Turkey) Hamza Ok	(Turkey) Sancaktepe	Free	1 September 2020	
MF	(Switzerland) Kerim Avci	(Turkey) Gaziantep	Free	7 September 2020	
MF	(Turkey) Emre Selen	(Turkey) Yeni Malatyaspor	Loan	9 September 2020	
MF	(Turkey) Yunus Akgün	(Turkey) Galatasaray	Loan	25 September 2020	
DF	(Turkey) Berkant Yaylan	(Turkey) İstanbul Başakşehir U19		25 September 2020	
DF	(Cameroon) Aurélien Chedjou	(France) Amiens		28 September 2020	
MF	(Switzerland) Gökhan Inler	(Turkey) İstanbul Başakşehir	Free	30 September 2020	
MF	(Turkey) Emircan Altıntaş	(Turkey) Alanyaspor	Loan	1 October 2020	
MF	(Morocco) Ismail Aissati	(Turkey) Denizlispor	Free	8 January 2021	
DF	(Turkey) Tolga Kalender	(Turkey) Mersin BB Meski	Free	11 January 2021	
DF	(Turkey) Kaan Kanak	(Turkey) Erzurumspor	Free	13 January 2021	
MF	(Nigeria) Francis Ezeh	(Turkey) Balıkesirspor	€200,000	13 January 2021	
FW	(Georgia (country)) Mikheil Ergemlidze	(Georgia (country)) Dinamo Tbilisi	Loan	17 January 2021	
FW	(Brazil) Rangel	(Finland) KuPS	Free	20 January 2021	
DF	(Turkey) Samet Akaydin	(Turkey) Ankara Keçiörengücü	€471,000	22 January 2021	
MF	(Turkey) İsmail Yüksek	(Turkey) Fenerbahçe	Loan	1 February 2021	
GK	(Turkey) Muhammed Şengezer	(Turkey) İstanbul Başakşehir	Loan	1 February 2021	

=== Out ===
Pos.	Player	Transferred to	Fee	Date	Source
FW	(Ukraine) Oleksandr Hladkyi	(Ukraine) Zorya Lugansk	Free	7 September 2020	
MF	(Turkey) Tevfik Altındağ	(Turkey) Adanaspor		9 September 2020	
DF	(Turkey) Adil Demirbağ	(Turkey) Konyaspor	€200,000	12 September 2020	
DF	(Bosnia and Herzegovina) Nermin Hodžić	(Bosnia and Herzegovina) Tuzla City	Free	29 September 2020	
MF	(Syria) Aias Aosman	(Turkey) Tuzlaspor		5 October 2020	
GK	(Turkey) Kurtuluş Yurt	(Turkey) Bandırmaspor		5 October 2020	
DF	(Cameroon) Aurélien Chedjou	Released		14 January 2021	
MF	(Turkey) Samed Kaya	(Turkey) Ankaraspor		21 January 2021	
DF	(Turkey) Anıl Karaer	(Turkey) Tuzlasspor	Free	21 January 2021	
DF	(Turkey) Mehmet Uslu	(Turkey) İstanbulspor	Free	27 January 2021	
MF	(Sweden) Erkan Zengin	(Turkey) Tuzlaspor		29 January 2021	
DF	(Turkey) Berkant Yaylan	(Turkey) Kozan Spor FK	Loan	29 January 2021	
FW	(Italy) Davide Lanzafame	(Italy) Vicenza	Free	1 February 2021	
MF	(Poland) Jakub Kosecki	(Poland) Cracovia	Free	21 February 2021	
FW	(Brazil) Rangel	(Finland) KuPS	Free	20 April 2021	

== Pre-season and friendlies ==
Win Draw Loss

10 October 2020 Friendly	Gaziantep (Turkey)	0–0	(Turkey) Adana Demirspor	Gaziantep
		Report		Stadium: Gaziantep Futbol Kulübü Tesisleri

== Competitions ==
=== Overall record ===
Competition	First match	Last match	Starting round	Final position	Record							
Competition	First match	Last match	Starting round	Final position	Pld	W	D	L	GF	GA	GD	Win %
TFF First League	13 September 2020	9 May 2021	Matchday 1	Winners	34	21	7	6	64	27	+37	61.76
Turkish Cup	4 November 2020	12 January 2021	Third round	Round of 16	4	2	1	1	10	6	+4	50.00
Total					38	23	8	7	74	33	+41	60.53

Source: Soccerway

=== TFF First League ===
==== League table ====
Pos	Team	Pld	W	D	L	GF	GA	GD	Pts	Qualification or relegation
1	Adana Demirspor (C, P)	34	21	7	6	64	27	+37	70	Promotion to the Süper Lig
2	Giresunspor (P)	34	21	7	6	54	25	+29	70	Promotion to the Süper Lig
3	Samsunspor	34	20	10	4	58	30	+28	70	Qualification for the Süper Lig Playoffs
4	İstanbulspor	34	19	7	8	62	34	+28	64	Qualification for the Süper Lig Playoffs
5	Altay (O, P)	34	20	3	11	66	39	+27	63	Qualification for the Süper Lig Playoffs

Source: TFF
Rules for classification: 1) Points; 2) Head-to-head points; 3) Head-to-head goal difference; 4) Head-to-head goals scored; 5) Goal difference; 6) Goals scored
(C) Champions; (O) Play-off winners; (P) Promoted

==== Results summary ====
Overall								Home						Away					
Pld	W	D	L	GF	GA	GD	Pts	W	D	L	GF	GA	GD	W	D	L	GF	GA	GD
34	21	7	6	64	27	+37	70	11	4	2	35	11	+24	10	3	4	29	16	+13

Source: TFF

==== Results by round ====
Round	1	2	3	4	5	6	7	8	9	10	11	12	13	14	15	16	17	18	19	20	21	22	23	24	25	26	27	28	29	30	31	32	33	34
Ground	A	H	A	H	A	H	A	H	A	H	A	H	H	A	H	A	H	H	A	H	A	H	A	H	A	H	A	H	A	A	H	A	H	A
Result	W	D	W	D	L	W	W	D	L	W	L	W	D	L	W	W	W	L	W	W	D	L	D	W	W	W	D	W	W	W	W	W	W	W
Position	1	3	1	4	7	5	3	4	6	3	6	4	8	8	8	6	5	5	4	4	4	4	5	5	4	3	4	4	3	2	2	1	1	1

Source: TFF
A = Away; H = Home; W = Win; D = Draw; L = Loss

==== Matches ====
13 September 2020 1	Bursaspor	1–3	Adana Demirspor	Bursa
16:30 TRT (UTC+3)	Akman 8'		Akyüz 48', 69'; Kılıç 79'	Stadium: Centennial Atatürk Stadium; Referee: Koray Gençerler

21 September 2020 2	Adana Demirspor	1–1	Boluspor	Adana
19:00 TRT (UTC+3)	Şahintürk 43'		Öztürk 45+4' (pen.)	Stadium: Adana 5 Ocak Stadium; Referee: Emer Malok

27 September 2020 3	Ankaraspor	1–3	Adana Demirspor	Ankara
16:30 TRT (UTC+3)	Şimşek 49'		Akyüz 17', 56'; Kurt 38'	Stadium: Osmanlı Stadium; Referee: Kutluhan Bilgiç

4 October 2020 4	Adana Demirspor	0–0	Adanaspor	Adana
19:00 TRT (UTC+3)				Stadium: Adana 5 Ocak Stadium; Referee: Erkan Özdamar

17 October 2020 5	Altay	1–0	Adana Demirspor	İzmir
19:00 TRT (UTC+3)	Paixão 15'			Stadium: Bornova Aziz Kocaoğlu Stadium; Referee: Mustafa Öğretmenoğlu

21 October 2020 6	Adana Demirspor	4–2	Ümraniyespor	Adana
16:00 TRT (UTC+3)	Kılıç 11', 31'; Zengin 52', 79'		Süzen 38' (pen.); Fernandes 47'	Stadium: Adana 5 Ocak Stadium; Referee: Alper Çetin

25 October 2020 7	Bandırmaspor	0–3	Adana Demirspor	Bandırma
12:30 TRT (UTC+3)			Akyüz 12', 49', 59'	Stadium: Bandırma 17 Eylül Stadium; Referee: Emre Kargın

1 November 2020 8	Adana Demirspor	1–1	Samsunspor	Adana
19:00 TRT (UTC+3)	Lanzafame 85'		Koçer 50'	Stadium: Adana 5 Ocak Stadium; Referee: Hüseyin Göçek

22 November 2020 10	Adana Demirspor	4–1	Eskişehirspor	Adana
19:00 TRT (UTC+3)	Karaer 69'; Akgün 71', 87'; Altıntaş 90+5'		Özcan 53'	Stadium: Adana 5 Ocak Stadium; Referee: Alper Ulusoy

29 November 2020 11	Ankara Keçiörengücü	1–0	Adana Demirspor	Ankara
13:30 TRT (UTC+3)	Manaj 25'		Zengin (penalty missed) 90'; Karaer (red card) 90+6'	Stadium: Ankara Aktepe Stadium; Referee: Sarper Barış Saka

6 December 2020 12	Adana Demirspor	2–0	Akhisarspor	Adana
19:00 TRT (UTC+3)	Kurt 45+2'; Zengin 58'			Stadium: Adana 5 Ocak Stadium; Referee: Burak Şeker

9 December 2020 13	Adana Demirspor	1–1	Altınordu	Adana
16:00 TRT (UTC+3)	Zengin 21'		Mimaroğlu 9'	Stadium: Adana 5 Ocak Stadium; Referee: Turgut Doman

13 December 2020 14	Giresunspor	2–0	Adana Demirspor	Giresun
19:00 TRT (UTC+3)	Nalepa 9' (pen.); Baldé 90+4'		Zengin (penalty missed) 26'	Stadium: Giresun Atatürk Stadium; Referee: Ümit Öztürk

21 December 2020 15	Adana Demirspor	3–1	Tuzlaspor	Adana
18:00 TRT (UTC+3)	Chedjou 11'; Traoré 18'; Akgün 44'		Thuram 86'	Stadium: Adana 5 Ocak Stadium; Referee: Ramazan Keleş

26 December 2020 16	Balıkesirspor	0–1	Adana Demirspor	Balıkesir
19:00 TRT (UTC+3)			Kılıç 24'	Stadium: Balıkesir Atatürk Stadium; Referee: Emre Kargın

30 December 2020 9	İstanbulspor	3–1	Adana Demirspor	Istanbul
19:00 TRT (UTC+3)	Zeybek 37'; Yaşar 81'; Ergün 90+6' (pen.)		Akyüz (penalty missed) 14', 14'	Stadium: Esenyurt Necmi Kadıoğlu Stadium; Referee: Atilla Karaoğlan

4 January 2021 17	Adana Demirspor	3–0	Menemen	Adana
19:00 TRT (UTC+3)	Sanuç 8'; Kılıç 30'; Altıntaş 44'			Stadium: Adana 5 Ocak Stadium; Referee: Çağdaş Altay

23 January 2021 18	Adana Demirspor	1–2	Bursaspor	Adana
19:00 TRT (UTC+3)	Kılıç 77'		Atasayar 52'; Akman 84'	Stadium: Adana 5 Ocak Stadium; Referee: Onur Özütoprak

31 January 2021 19	Boluspor	1–2	Adana Demirspor	Bolu
16:00 TRT (UTC+3)	Köksal 90+3'		Altıntaş 41'; Kılıç 82' (pen.)	Stadium: Bolu Atatürk Stadium; Referee: Alper Çetin

6 February 2021 20	Adana Demirspor	2–0	Ankaraspor	Adana
19:00 TRT (UTC+3)	Kılıç 33' (pen.); Dibba 73'			Stadium: Adana 5 Ocak Stadium; Referee: Emre Kargın

14 February 2021 21	Adanaspor	2–2	Adana Demirspor	Adana
19:00 TRT (UTC+3)	Keleş 55'; Çiçek 75'		Kılıç 4' (pen.); Rangel 90+4'	Stadium: Adana 5 Ocak Stadium; Referee: Kadir Sağlam

19 February 2021 22	Adana Demirspor	1–2	Altay	Adana
19:00 TRT (UTC+3)	Akyüz (penalty missed) 66'; Güler 83'		Paixão 4', 5'	Stadium: New Adana Stadium; Referee: Burak Şeker

23 February 2021 23	Ümraniyespor	0–0	Adana Demirspor	Istanbul
13:30 TRT (UTC+3)				Stadium: Ümraniye Municipality City Stadium; Referee: Cihan Aydın

27 February 2021 24	Adana Demirspor	2–0	Bandırmaspor	Adana
19:00 TRT (UTC+3)	Kurt 50'; Akyüz 63'			Stadium: New Adana Stadium; Referee: Çağdaş Altay

6 March 2021 25	Samsunspor	0–2	Adana Demirspor	Samsun
19:00 TRT (UTC+3)	Dibba 12'; Altıntaş 80'			Stadium: Samsun 19 Mayıs Stadium; Referee: Koray Gençerler

13 March 2021 26	Adana Demirspor	2–0	İstanbulspor	Adana
19:00 TRT (UTC+3)	Dibba 6'; Inler 51'			Stadium: New Adana Stadium; Referee: Erkan Özdamar

20 March 2021 27	Eskişehirspor	1–1	Adana Demirspor	Eskişehir
16:00 TRT (UTC+3)	Coşkun 90+4'		Altıntaş 89'	Stadium: New Eskişehir Stadium; Referee: Burak Pakkan

3 April 2021 28	Adana Demirspor	2–0	Ankara Keçiörengücü	Adana
19:00 TRT (UTC+3)	Dibba 26'; Şen 90+4'			Stadium: New Adana Stadium; Referee: Murat Erdoğan

10 April 2021 29	Akhisarspor	2–3	Adana Demirspor	Akhisar
19:00 TRT (UTC+3)	Sissoko 41'; Keleş 53'		Kılıç 16'; Kurt 28'; Sanuç 74'	Stadium: Spor Toto Akhisar Stadium; Referee: Alper Çetin

13 April 2021 30	Altınordu	0–1	Adana Demirspor	İzmir
19:00 TRT (UTC+3)			Dibba 14'	Stadium: Bornova Aziz Kocaoğlu Stadium; Referee: Sarper Barış Saka

17 April 2021 31	Adana Demirspor	3–0	Giresunspor	Adana
19:00 TRT (UTC+3)	Ezeh 11'; Kurt 37'; Kılıç 42' (pen.)			Stadium: New Adana Stadium; Referee: Erkan Özdamar

25 April 2021 32	Tuzlaspor	0–3	Adana Demirspor	Istanbul
20:30 TRT (UTC+3)			Kılıç (penalty missed) 4'; Dibba 19', 48'; Akgün 87'	Stadium: Esenyurt Necmi Kadıoğlu Stadium; Referee: Koray Gençerler

1 May 2021 33	Adana Demirspor	3–0	Balıkesirspor	Adana
16:00 TRT (UTC+3)	Dibba 57'; Sanuç 66'; Akgün 86'			Stadium: New Adana Stadium; Referee: Suat Arslanboğa

9 May 2021 34	Menemen	1–4	Adana Demirspor	Menemen
20:30 TRT (UTC+3)	Zenke 76'		Dibba 6'; Ezeh 11'; Kılıç 23' (pen.); Kurt 53'	Stadium: Menemen İlçe Stadyumu; Referee: Tugay Numanoğlu

=== Turkish Cup ===
4 November 2020 Third round	Adana Demirspor	3–1	Kestelspor	Adana
15:30 TRT (UTC+3)	Korkmaz 19' (o.g.); Karaer 40'; Alkan 49'	Report	Görgülü 80'	Stadium: Adana 5 Ocak Stadium; Referee: Veli Karakaya

25 November 2020 Fourth round	Adana Demirspor	4–1	Afyonspor	Adana
19:00 TRT (UTC+3)	Zengin 15'; Şahintürk 40'; Uslu 59'; Altıntaş 76'	Report	Taşdemir 45+1'	Stadium: Adana 5 Ocak Stadium; Referee: Alpaslan Şen

16 December 2020 Fifth round	Trabzonspor	2–2 (3–4 p)	Adana Demirspor	Trabzon
18:15 TRT (UTC+3)	Vitor Hugo 55', 90+3'; Pereira (yellow card) 56'; Baker (penalty missed) 90+9'	Report	Akgün 47'; Akyüz 79'; Çelik (yellow card) 82'; Güler (yellow card) 90+4'; Sanuç (yellow card) 90+5'; Rassoul (yellow card) 90+8' (yellow-red card) 90+8'	Stadium: Şenol Güneş Sports Complex; Referee: Alper Çetin
	Penalties
	Parmak (penalty missed); Vitor Hugo (penalty missed); Marlon (penalty scored); Flávio (penalty scored); Baker (penalty scored)		(penalty scored) Kılıç; (penalty scored) Akyüz; (penalty missed) Dibba; (penalty scored) Inler; (penalty scored) Sanuç

12 January 2021 Round of 16	Sivasspor	2–1 (a.e.t.)	Adana Demirspor	Sivas
18:45 TRT (UTC+3)	Öztekin 37'; Yatabaré 116'; Erdal (yellow card) 118'	Report	Akgün 44'	Stadium: New Sivas 4 Eylül Stadium; Referee: Burak Şeker
