= 2019–20 TFF 1. Lig =

TFF 1. Lig
- Season: 2019–20
- Dates: 16 August 2019 – 19 July 2020
- Champions: Hatayspor
- Promoted: Hatayspor; BB Erzurumspor; Fatih Karagümrük
- Matches: 311
- Goals: 786 (2.53 per match)
- Top goalscorer: Marco Paixão (22 goals)
- Biggest home win: Ümraniyespor 4–0 Altınordu (26 October 2019); İstanbulspor 4–0 Fatih Karagümrük (29 November 2019)
- Biggest away win: Balıkesirspor 1–6 Adana Demirspor (20 January 2020); Balıkesirspor 0–5 İstanbulspor (16 February 2020); Balıkesirspor 0–5 Fatih Karagümrük (2 July 2020)
- Highest scoring: Akhisarspor 4–3 İstanbulspor (7 December 2019); Balıkesirspor 1–6 Adana Demirspor (20 January 2020); Akhisarspor 3–4 Fatih Karagümrük (18 July 2020); Osmanlıspor 4–3 Balıkesirspor (19 July 2020)
- Longest winning run: Hatayspor (5 matches)
- Longest unbeaten run: Fatih Karagümrük (14 matches)
- Longest winless run: Boluspor (16 matches)
- Longest losing run: Eskişehirspor; Giresunspor (5 matches)
- All statistics correct as of 30 July 2020.

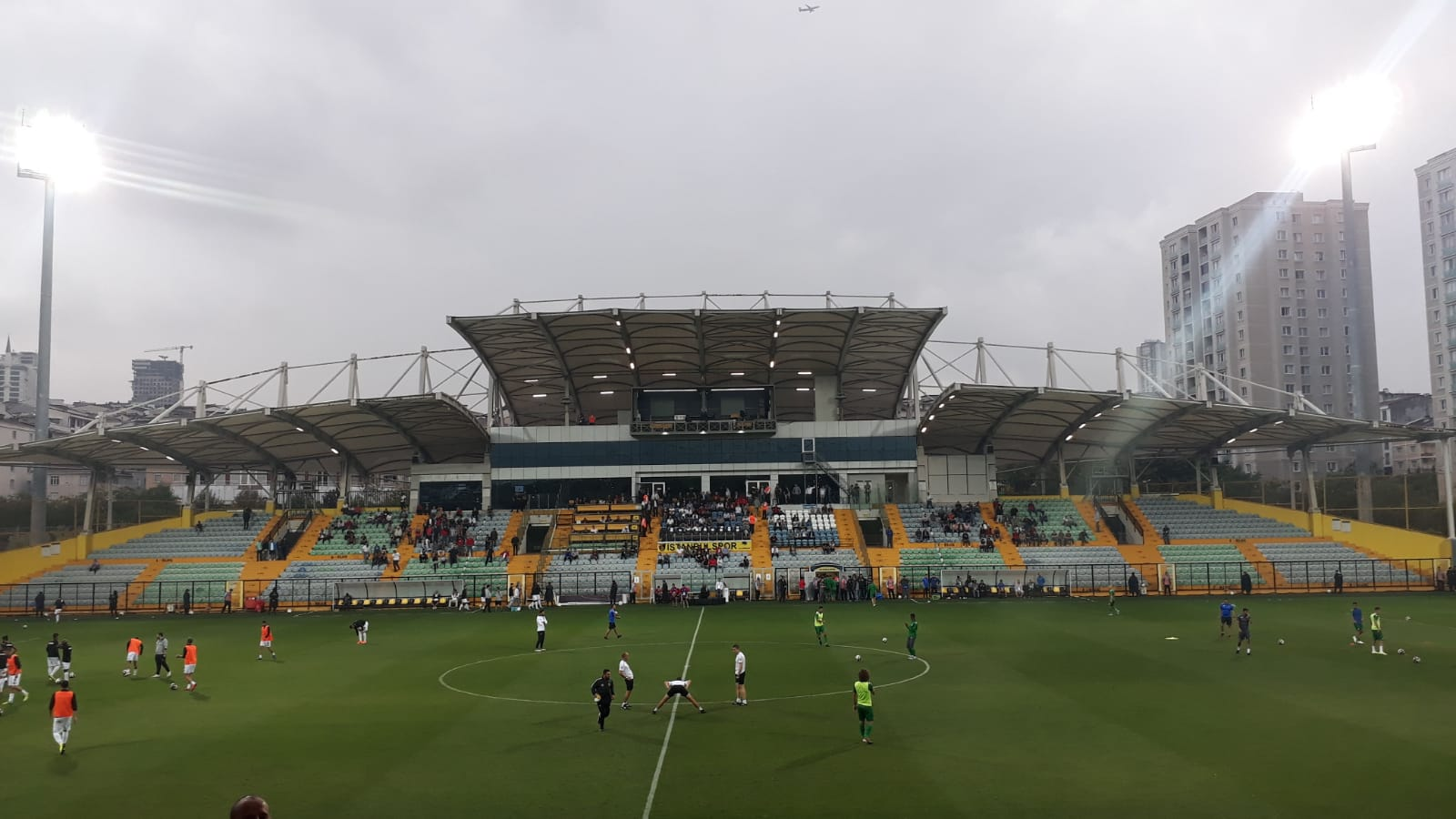
Necmi Kadıoğlu Stadyumu (III)

The 2019–20 TFF 1. Lig was the 19th season since the league was established in 2001 and 57th season of the second-level football league of Turkey since its establishment in 1963–64. The season began on 16 August 2019 and the regular season will be ended on 2 May 2020. Fixtures for the 2019–20 season were announced on 18 July 2019. On 12 March 2020, The Ministry of Youth and Sports announced matches will be played behind closed doors in the stadiums until the end of April due to the coronavirus pandemic. On 19 March 2020, the league was suspended. The league resumed behind closed doors on 19 June until 19 July 2020. The semi-finals were played on 22 and 26 July, then the final was played on 30 July 2020.

== Teams ==
- Akhisarspor, BB Erzurumspor and Bursaspor relegated from 2018–19 Süper Lig.
- Denizlispor, Gençlerbirliği and Gazişehir Gaziantep promoted to 2019–20 Süper Lig.
- Afjet Afyonspor, Elazığspor and Kardemir Karabükspor relegated to 2019–20 TFF Second League.
- Keçiörengücü, Menemenspor and Fatih Karagümrük promoted from 2018–19 TFF Second League.

=== Stadiums and locations ===
Location of teams in 2019–20 TFF 1. Lig
Istanbul Province clubs

Team	Home city	Stadium	Capacity
Adana Demirspor	Adana (Yüreğir)	Adana 5 Ocak Stadium	14,805
Adanaspor	Adana (Çukurova)	Adana 5 Ocak Stadium	14,805
Akhisarspor	Manisa (Akhisar)	Spor Toto Akhisar Stadium	12,139
Altay	İzmir (Gaziemir)	İzmir Atatürk Stadium	51,295
Altınordu	İzmir (Karabağlar)	Doğanlar Stadium	12,500
Balıkesirspor	Balıkesir	Balıkesir Atatürk Stadium	15,800
BB Erzurumspor	Erzurum	Kazım Karabekir Stadium	23,277
Boluspor	Bolu	Bolu Atatürk Stadium	8,456
Bursaspor	Bursa	Büyüksehir Belediyesi Stadium	43,361
Eskişehirspor	Eskişehir	New Eskişehir Stadium	34,930
Fatih Karagümrük	Istanbul (Fatih)	Vefa Stadium	12,500
Giresunspor	Giresun	Giresun Atatürk Stadium	12,191
Hatayspor	Hatay	Antakya Atatürk Stadium	6,015
İstanbulspor	Istanbul (Büyükçekmece)	Necmi Kadıoğlu Stadium	4,491
Keçiörengücü	Ankara (Keçiören)	Ankara Aktepe Stadium	4,883
Menemenspor	İzmir (Menemen)	Menemen İlçe Stadium	2,500
Osmanlıspor	Ankara (Sincan)	Osmanlı Stadium	20,000
Ümraniyespor	Istanbul (Ümraniye)	Ümraniye Belediyesi Şehir Stadium	1,601

=== Foreign players ===
Club	Player 1	Player 2	Player 3	Player 4	Player 5	Player 6	Player 7	Player 8	Player 9	Player 10	Former Players
Adana Demirspor	(The Gambia) Mustapha Carayol	(The Gambia) Pa Dibba	(Mali) Hamidou Traoré	(Mali) Ibrahima Koné	(Poland) Jakub Kosecki	(Senegal) Joher Rassoul	(Serbia) Milan Mitrović	(Syria) Aias Aosman	(Ukraine) Oleksandr Hladkyi		(Belgium) Jonathan Legear (Brazil) Anderson (Republic of Ireland) Anthony Stokes (Mali) Djemoussa Traore
Adanaspor	(Brazil) Renan Diniz	(Brazil) Roni	(Bosnia and Herzegovina) Goran Karačić	(Cameroon) Mbilla Etame	(Georgia (country)) Giorgi Arabidze	(Mali) Moussa Bagayoko	(Nigeria) Emeka Eze	(Senegal) Amidou Diop			
Akhisarspor	(Albania) Sokol Cikalleshi	(Bosnia and Herzegovina) Avdija Vršajević	(Bosnia and Herzegovina) Edin Cocalić	(Bosnia and Herzegovina) Irfan Hadžić	(Iceland) Elmar Bjarnason	(Serbia) Milan Lukač	(Slovenia) Rajko Rotman				
Altay	(Belarus) Anton Putsila	(Brazil) Leandrinho	(Cape Verde) Hélder Tavares	(Greece) Andreas Tatos	(Netherlands) Leandro Kappel	(Nigeria) Adamu Alhassan	(Nigeria) Asuque Aniekeme	(Portugal) Marco Paixão	(Togo) Prince Segbefia		
Altınordu											
Balıkesirspor	(Bosnia and Herzegovina) Nemanja Anđušić	(Bosnia and Herzegovina) Nermin Hodzic	(Central African Republic) Foxi Kéthévoama	(Croatia) Andrija Vuković	(Croatia) Antonio Mršić	(Ghana) Mahatma Otoo	(Mali) Aly Mallé	(Nigeria) Francis Ezeh			(Croatia) Tomislav Glumac
BB Erzurumspor	(Algeria) Jugurtha Hamroun	(Benin) Mickaël Poté	(Bosnia and Herzegovina) Ibrahim Šehić	(Bosnia and Herzegovina) Jasmin Šćuk	(France) Gabriel Obertan	(France) Rashad Muhammed	(Ivory Coast) Ibrahim Sissoko	(Mali) Mahamadou Ba			(Togo) Gilles Sunu
Boluspor	(Benin) Moïse Adiléhou	(Bosnia and Herzegovina) Emir Halilović	(Brazil) Dodô	(Kyrgyzstan) Alimardon Shukurov	(Netherlands) Rydell Poepon	(Nigeria) Seth Sincere	(Republic of the Congo) Dzon Delarge	(Paraguay) Orlando Mosquera	(Slovenia) Rok Kidric		
Bursaspor	(Burkina Faso) Abdou Traoré	(Nigeria) Shehu Abdullahi	(North Macedonia) Jani Atanasov	(Senegal) Mamadou Diarra	(Ukraine) Yevhen Seleznyov						(Brazil) Igor Silva (Romania) Iasmin Latovlevici
Eskişehirspor											(Ghana) Kamal Issah (Ivory Coast) Ibrahim Sissoko (Nigeria) Jesse Sekidika (Serbia) Marko Milinković
Fatih Karagümrük	(Chile) Cristóbal Jorquera	(Ghana) Joseph Attamah	(Netherlands) Brahim Darri	(Nigeria) Raheem Lawal	(Poland) Artur Sobiech	(Senegal) Alassane Ndao	(Serbia) Bojan Šaranov	(Slovakia) Erik Sabo	(Slovenia) Gaber Dobrovoljc	(Switzerland) Innocent Emeghara	(The Gambia) Alagie Sosseh (Sweden) Stefan Silva
Giresunspor	(Brazil) Adriano	(Brazil) Renan Foguinho	(Guinea) Guy-Michel Landel	(Romania) Cristian Tănase	(Romania) Raul Rusescu	(Serbia) Marko Milinković	(Venezuela) Yonathan Del Valle				(Belgium) Stallone Limbombe
Hatayspor	(Bulgaria) Strahil Popov	(France) Idir Ouali	(France) Rayane Aabid	(Ghana) Joseph Akomadi	(Portugal) Hélder Barbosa	(Senegal) Dame Diop					(Democratic Republic of the Congo) Jeremy Bokila (Mali) Hamidou Maiga
İstanbulspor	(Bosnia and Herzegovina) Kamal Issah	(Brazil) Wellington	(Cameroon) Patrick Etoga	(Ghana) Kamal Issah	(Senegal) Papa Alioune Diouf						(Ghana) Joseph Mensah (Iran) Allahyar Sayyadmanesh
Keçiörengücü	(Democratic Republic of the Congo) Jeremy Bokila	(Gabon) Lévy Madinda	(Mali) Famoussa Koné	(Mali) Idrissa Diarra	(Senegal) Boubacar Dialiba	(Senegal) Theo Mendy					
Menemenspor	(Albania) Gentian Selmani	(Kosovo) David Domgjoni	(Nigeria) Henri Onoka	(Nigeria) Rasheed Akanbi	(Nigeria) Sikiru Olatunbosun	(Serbia) Jasmin Trtovac					(France) Abdelaye Diakité (France) Ibrahim Sangaré
Osmanlıspor	(Bosnia and Herzegovina) Ognjen Todorović	(Cameroon) Eric Ayuk	(Serbia) Jovan Blagojević	(Uruguay) Santiago Mele							
Ümraniyespor	(Bosnia and Herzegovina) Ajdin Hasić	(Croatia) Tomislav Glumac	(Croatia) Tonći Mujan	(France) Ghislain Gimbert	(France) Riad Nouri	(Nigeria) Chukwuma Akabueze	(Portugal) Vasco Fernandes				(Romania) Valentin Lazăr

== League table ==
Pos	Team	Pld	W	D	L	GF	GA	GD	Pts	Qualification or relegation
1	Hatayspor (C, P)	34	19	9	6	48	28	+20	66	Promotion to the Süper Lig
2	BB Erzurumspor (P)	34	18	8	8	41	25	+16	62	Promotion to the Süper Lig
3	Adana Demirspor	34	17	10	7	68	44	+24	61	Qualification for the Süper Lig Playoffs
4	Akhisarspor	34	16	9	9	46	39	+7	57	Qualification for the Süper Lig Playoffs
5	Fatih Karagümrük (P)	34	15	11	8	53	39	+14	56	Qualification for the Süper Lig Playoffs
6	Bursaspor (Note: Bursaspor have been deducted 3 points.)	34	17	8	9	49	41	+8	56	Qualification for the Süper Lig Playoffs
7	Altay	34	14	12	8	45	37	+8	54	
8	Keçiörengücü	34	13	11	10	33	28	+5	50	
9	Menemenspor	34	11	11	12	42	46	−4	44 (Note: Head-to-head points: Menemenspor 7, Giresunspor 6, Ümraniyespor 4)	
10	Giresunspor	34	12	8	14	40	47	−7	44	
11	Ümraniyespor	34	12	8	14	48	51	−3	44	
12	İstanbulspor	34	9	13	12	45	43	+2	40	
13	Balıkesirspor	34	9	11	14	36	48	−12	38	
14	Altınordu	34	8	13	13	37	44	−7	37	
15	Boluspor	34	6	15	13	30	41	−11	33	
16	Osmanlıspor (Note: Osmanlıspor have been deducted 3 points.)	34	8	9	17	41	53	−12	30	
17	Adanaspor	34	3	12	19	31	53	−22	21	
18	Eskişehirspor (Note: Eskişehirspor have been deducted 15 points.)	34	7	6	21	34	60	−26	12	

Source: TFF
Rules for classification: 1) Points; 2) Head-to-head points; 3) Head-to-head goal difference; 4) Head-to-head goals scored; 5) Goal difference; 6) Goals scored
(C) Champions; (P) Promoted

=== Positions by round ===
The table lists the positions of teams after each week of matches. In order to preserve chronological evolvements, any postponed matches are not included to the round at which they were originally scheduled, but added to the full round they were played immediately afterwards.

Team ╲ Round	1	2	3	4	5	6	7	8	9	10	11	12	13	14	15	16	17	18	19	20	21	22	23	24	25	26	27	28	29	30	31	32	33	34
Hatayspor	7	2	2	3	7	4	2	1	2	1	1	1	1	1	1	1	1	1	1	1	1	1	1	1	1	1	1	1	1	1	1	1	1	1
BB Erzurumspor	8	13	8	13	10	12	10	10	8	5	6	4	2	3	2	4	2	2	2	2	2	2	2	2	2	2	2	2	2	2	3	2	2	2
Adana Demirspor	3	4	5	8	3	5	8	11	10	11	11	10	13	11	13	11	8	8	5	4	4	4	4	3	3	3	5	4	3	3	2	3	3	3
Akhisarspor	6	7	10	7	2	1	4	2	5	4	5	3	5	2	3	3	5	4	6	8	7	6	9	7	7	5	4	5	6	5	5	5	4	4
Fatih Karagümrük	1	3	3	4	4	9	5	3	3	6	2	7	8	8	7	10	11	12	11	11	11	9	6	5	6	7	6	6	7	7	6	6	6	5
Bursaspor	15	9	4	2	6	2	11	8	7	7	8	5	3	4	6	7	6	3	3	3	3	3	3	4	4	4	3	3	5	4	4	4	5	6
Altay	14	15	11	6	8	11	6	4	6	8	10	11	10	12	10	9	10	9	9	6	5	8	5	6	5	6	7	7	4	6	7	7	7	7
Keçiörengücü	10	5	6	5	5	7	7	6	9	9	7	9	6	6	8	5	3	5	4	5	8	5	7	9	9	10	10	10	10	9	9	9	8	8
Menemenspor	4	11	12	15	15	15	13	12	12	10	9	6	7	7	5	2	4	7	8	10	9	7	10	11	12	12	12	12	11	11	11	11	11	9
Giresunspor	17	17	17	17	17	17	16	17	15	15	13	12	11	10	11	12	12	11	10	9	6	10	12	12	10	9	9	8	8	8	10	10	10	10
Ümraniyespor	2	1	1	1	1	3	1	5	1	2	3	2	4	5	4	6	7	6	7	7	12	11	8	8	8	8	8	9	9	10	8	8	9	11
İstanbulspor	9	12	14	10	12	10	9	9	11	12	12	13	12	13	12	13	13	13	13	13	13	13	13	13	13	13	13	13	13	13	13	12	12	12
Balıkesirspor	16	10	13	9	9	6	3	7	4	3	4	8	9	9	9	8	9	10	12	12	10	12	11	10	11	11	11	11	12	12	12	13	13	13
Altınordu	13	16	15	12	14	14	15	15	17	17	17	16	16	14	14	14	14	14	14	14	14	14	14	14	14	14	14	14	14	14	14	14	14	14
Boluspor	11	14	16	16	16	16	17	16	14	14	14	14	14	16	16	16	16	17	17	17	18	18	17	16	16	16	15	15	15	15	15	15	15	15
Osmanlıspor	5	8	9	14	11	8	12	14	13	13	15	15	15	15	15	15	15	15	15	16	15	15	15	15	15	15	16	16	16	16	16	16	16	16
Adanaspor	12	6	7	11	13	13	14	13	16	16	16	17	17	17	17	17	17	16	16	15	16	16	16	17	17	17	17	17	17	17	17	17	17	17
Eskişehirspor	18	18	18	18	18	18	18	18	18	18	18	18	18	18	18	18	18	18	18	18	17	17	18	18	18	18	18	18	18	18	18	18	18	18

Champion, Promotion to Süper Lig
Promotion to Süper Lig
Play-off

Source: TFF

== Results ==
Home \ Away	ADS	ADA	AKH	ALT	ATO	BAL	BBE	BOL	BUR	ESK	FKG	GRS	HAT	İST	KÖG	MBS	OSM	ÜMR
Adana Demirspor	—	4–1	2–3	2–2	4–2	2–0	1–0	2–2	4–1	2–3	1–1	4–2	1–1	3–0	0–0	0–1	2–1	4–2
Adanaspor	0–0	—	0–0	3–3	0–0	1–1	0–0	0–0	2–3	3–2	2–0	1–1	1–2	2–2	1–1	1–3	2–1	0–1
Akhisarspor	1–1	1–0	—	2–1	0–0	3–1	0–0	0–0	0–1	2–1	0–2	2–0	3–1	4–3	3–4	2–2	3–2	1–0
Altay	1–0	3–1	3–1	—	1–0	1–0	0–1	2–1	2–1	1–1	0–1	0–0	2–1	1–0	0–0	0–2	3–0	1–3
Altınordu	2–2	1–0	2–0	0–3	—	1–1	2–1	2–0	0–0	4–1	1–2	3–1	2–2	1–1	1–2	1–0	2–2	1–2
Balıkesirspor	1–6	3–0	0–0	0–0	0–0	—	2–1	3–2	1–3	2–0	0–5	2–0	0–1	0–5	2–2	0–1	1–1	2–0
BB Erzurumspor	1–2	2–1	0–0	1–3	1–0	1–0	—	1–0	2–1	1–0	1–3	2–0	3–1	2–2	1–0	2–0	2–0	4–1
Boluspor	0–0	2–1	0–1	0–2	0–0	1–1	1–1	—	1–1	1–1	0–2	2–0	1–0	1–2	3–1	2–2	0–2	1–1
Bursaspor	2–1	1–0	2–1	2–2	1–0	0–0	1–0	1–1	—	0–1	2–1	2–3	2–1	1–1	1–0	2–2	3–1	2–1
Eskişehirspor	1–4	0–0	1–2	2–2	3–0	1–2	1–2	0–3	0–2	—	1–3	0–2	0–1	0–3	1–1	3–0	3–2	3–1
Fatih Karagümrük	2–2	3–0	2–3	2–2	3–3	0–0	0–1	3–1	3–1	2–0	—	2–1	1–1	1–0	0–2	1–1	2–0	2–3
Giresunspor	1–0	3–1	1–0	1–2	1–1	0–3	0–2	2–0	0–1	3–1	1–1	—	2–2	2–1	1–0	0–2	2–1	2–1
Hatayspor	2–1	1–0	2–3	3–2	1–0	2–0	0–0	3–0	3–1	1–0	0–0	1–1	—	1–0	1–0	2–0	1–0	2–0
İstanbulspor	0–2	1–0	0–1	2–2	0–2	2–2	1–1	0–0	1–2	1–0	4–0	2–1	2–2	—	1–1	1–2	1–0	2–1
Keçiörengücü	1–3	2–0	1–0	2–0	2–1	1–0	1–0	0–1	1–0	0–1	3–0	0–0	0–1	0–0	—	2–1	1–0	1–1
Menemenspor	2–3	4–2	0–1	1–1	1–1	1–0	0–0	1–1	2–1	3–1	0–1	0–3	0–4	2–2	1–1	—	1–2	3–0 (Note: Match awarded.)
Osmanlıspor	2–3	2–2	2–1	0–0	2–1	4–3	1–3	2–1	2–4	1–1	1–1	1–1	0–1	1–1	0–0	2–0	—	3–2
Ümraniyespor	2–3	2–1	2–2	1–0	4–0	0–3	1–2	1–1	1–1	3–0	1–1	4–1	0–0	2–1	2–0	1–1	1–0	—

Source: TFF (in Turkish)
Legend: Blue = home team win; Yellow = draw; Red = away team win.
For upcoming matches, an "a" indicates there is an article about the rivalry between the two participants.

== Promotion playoffs ==
=== Semifinals ===
Team 1	Agg.	Team 2	1st leg	2nd leg
Bursaspor	1–4	Adana Demirspor	0–0	1–4
Fatih Karagümrük	4–3	Akhisarspor	3–3	1–0

=== Final ===
Team 1	Score	Team 2
Adana Demirspor	1–1 (5–6 p)	Fatih Karagümrük

== Statistics ==
=== Top goalscorers ===
As of matches played 19 July 2020

Top goalscorers
Rank	Player	Team	Goals
1	(Portugal) Marco Paixão	Altay	22
2	(Romania) Raul Rusescu	Giresunspor	12
3	(Turkey) Emircan Altıntaş	Ümraniyespor	11
3	(Sweden) Erkan Zengin	Adana Demirspor	11
3	(Turkey) Mertan Caner Öztürk	Osmanlıspor	11
6	(Turkey) Burhan Eşer	Akhisarspor	10
6	(France) Ghislain Gimbert	Ümraniyespor	10
6	(Turkey) Mehmet Akyüz	Adana Demirspor	10
6	(Turkey) Samed Kaya	Menemenspor	10
6	(Ukraine) Yevhen Seleznyov	Bursaspor	10
