= 2020–21 TFF 1. Lig =

TFF 1. Lig
- Season: 2020–21
- Dates: 11 September 2020 – 9 May 2021
- Champions: Adana Demirspor
- Promoted: Adana Demirspor; Giresunspor; Altay
- Relegated: Akhisarspor; Ankaraspor; Eskişehirspor
- Matches: 306
- Goals: 854 (2.79 per match)
- Top goalscorer: Marco Paixão (22 goals)
- Biggest home win: Altay 6–0 Eskişehirspor (27 September 2020); Ankara Keçiörengücü 6–0 Akhisarspor (22 November 2020)
- Biggest away win: Tuzlaspor 0–6 Bandırmaspor (22 November 2020)
- Highest scoring: Altınordu 6–3 Eskişehirspor (4 April 2021)
- Longest winning run: Giresunspor (12 matches)
- Longest unbeaten run: Giresunspor (16 matches)
- Longest winless run: Eskişehirspor (21 matches)
- Longest losing run: Akhisarspor (8 matches)
- All statistics correct as of 10 May 2021.

The 2020–21 TFF 1. Lig was the 20th season since the league was established in 2001 and 58th season of the second-level football league of Turkey since its establishment in 1963–64. There was no relegation to or from the TFF First League the prior year due to the coronavirus pandemic.

== Teams ==
- Hatayspor, BB Erzurumspor and Fatih Karagümrük promoted to 2020–21 Süper Lig.
- Bandırmaspor, Samsunspor and Tuzlaspor promoted from TFF 2. Lig.
- The bottom three teams will be relegated to the TFF 2. Lig.

=== Stadiums and locations ===
Location of teams in 2020–21 TFF 1. Lig

Team	Home city	Stadium	Capacity
Adana Demirspor	Adana (Yüreğir)	Adana 5 Ocak Stadium	14,805
Adanaspor	Adana (Çukurova)	Adana 5 Ocak Stadium	14,805
Akhisarspor	Manisa (Akhisar)	Spor Toto Akhisar Stadium	12,139
Altay	İzmir (Gaziemir)	İzmir Atatürk Stadium	51,295
Altınordu	İzmir (Karabağlar)	Doğanlar Stadium	12,500
Ankara Keçiörengücü	Ankara (Keçiören)	Ankara Aktepe Stadium	4,883
Ankaraspor	Ankara (Sincan)	Osmanlı Stadium	20,000
Balıkesirspor	Balıkesir (Altıeylül)	Balıkesir Atatürk Stadium	15,800
Bandırmaspor	Balıkesir (Bandırma)	17 Eylül Stadium	12,725
Boluspor	Bolu	Bolu Atatürk Stadium	8,456
Bursaspor	Bursa	Bursa Büyükşehir Belediye Stadium	43,361
Eskişehirspor	Eskişehir	Eskişehir Stadium	34,930
Giresunspor	Giresun	Giresun Atatürk Stadium	12,191
İstanbulspor	Istanbul (Büyükçekmece)	Necmi Kadıoğlu Stadium	4,491
Menemenspor	İzmir (Menemen)	Menemen İlçe Stadium	2,500
Samsunspor	Samsun	Samsun Stadium	33,919
Tuzlaspor	Istanbul (Tuzla)	Tuzla Belediye Stadium	2,000
Ümraniyespor	Istanbul (Ümraniye)	Ümraniye Belediyesi Şehir Stadium	1,601

=== Personnel and sponsorship ===
Team	Head coach	Captain	Kit manufacturer	Sponsor
Adana Demirspor	(Turkey) Samet Aybaba	(Turkey) Mehmet Akyüz	Diadora	Bitexen
Adanaspor	(Turkey) Emrah Bayraktar	(Germany) Tevfik Altındağ	Capelli Sport	
Akhisarspor	(Turkey) Fırat Gül	(Turkey) Kadir Keleş	Nike	Ramiz
Altay	(Turkey) Mustafa Denizli	(Turkey) İbrahim Öztürk	Nike	Folkart
Altınordu	(Turkey) Hüseyin Eroğlu	(Turkey) Sinan Osmanoğlu	Nike	Petrol Ofisi
Ankara Keçiörengücü	(Turkey) İlker Püren	(Turkey) Süleyman Olgun	Nike	
Ankaraspor	(Turkey) Mehmet Ak	(Turkey) Beykan Şimşek	Adidas	
Balıkesirspor	(Turkey) Yusuf Şimşek	(Turkey) Atilla Özmen	Umbro	Aydeniz Et
Bandırmaspor	(Turkey) Erkan Sözeri	(Turkey) Erkan Taşkıran	Nike	HDI Sigorta
Boluspor	(Turkey) Reha Erginer	(Turkey) Muhammed Bayır	Diadora	Eminevim
Bursaspor	(Turkey) Mustafa Er	(Turkey) Özer Hurmacı	Kappa	Tasarruf
Eskişehirspor	(Turkey) -	(Turkey) Sezgin Coşkun	Nadll	Eti
Giresunspor	(Turkey) Hakan Keleş	(Turkey) Eren Tozlu	Diadora	HDI Sigorta
İstanbulspor	(Turkey) Fatih Tekke	(Turkey) Onur Ergün	Jako	Uğur Okulları
Menemenspor	(Turkey) Ümit Karan	(Turkey) Murat Erdemir	Nike	Medicana
Samsunspor	(Turkey) Ertuğrul Sağlam	(Turkey) Caner Arıcı	Macron	Yılport
Tuzlaspor	(Turkey) Ali Tandoğan	(Turkey) Haydar Yılmaz	Nike	Central Rent-a-Car
Ümraniyespor	(Turkey) Recep Uçar	(Turkey) Gökhan Süzen	Nike	Bereket Sigorta

=== Foreign players ===
Club	Player 1	Player 2	Player 3	Player 4	Player 5	Player 6	Player 7	Player 8	Player 9	Player 10	Former Players
Adana Demirspor	(The Gambia) Pa Dibba	(Georgia (country)) Mikheil Ergemlidze	(Lithuania) Emilijus Zubas	(Mali) Hamidou Traoré	(Nigeria) Francis Ezeh	(Senegal) Joher Rassoul					(Brazil) Rangel (Cameroon) Aurélien Chedjou (Italy) Davide Lanzafame (Morocco) Ismaïl Aissati (Poland) Jakub Kosecki (Syria) Aias Aosman
Adanaspor	(Bosnia and Herzegovina) Goran Karačić	(Burkina Faso) Adolphe Belem	(Ghana) Isaac Donkor	(Nigeria) Iko Seth	(Nigeria) Kingsley Innocent	(Nigeria) Papa Daniel	(Nigeria) Sampson Agoha	(Serbia) Ognjen Ožegović			(Brazil) Roni (Israel) Ismaeel Ryan (Mali) Moussa Bagayoko
Akhisarspor	(Albania) Arens Mateli	(Cameroon) Akwo Tarh Ayuk	(Guinea) Alseny Soumah	(Guinea) Alya Touré	(Ivory Coast) Ibrhaim Sissoko	(Nigeria) Nsima Peter	(Nigeria) Raheem Lawal	(Republic of the Congo) Dzon Delarge	(Senegal) Paul Keita	(Serbia) Milan Lukač	(Bosnia and Herzegovina) Avdija Vršajević (Bosnia and Herzegovina) Irfan Hadžić (Iceland) Elmar Bjarnason (Slovenia) Rajko Rotman
Altay	(Bosnia and Herzegovina) Jasmin Šćuk	(Brazil) Márcio Mossoró	(Gabon) André Poko	(Morocco) Adrien Regattin	(Netherlands) Leandro Kappel	(Poland) Adam Stachowiak	(Portugal) Marco Paixão	(Senegal) Khaly Thiam			(Belarus) Anton Putsila (Bosnia and Herzegovina) Edin Cocalić (Brazil) William Amorim (France) Armand Gnanduillet (Serbia) Jovan Blagojević
Altınordu											
Ankara Keçiörengücü	(Ghana) Kamal Issah	(Guinea) Sadio Diallo	(Kosovo) Ilir Mustafa	(Nigeria) Emeka Eze	(Senegal) Boubacar Dialiba	(Sweden) Edin Hamidović					(Albania) Edon Hasani (England) Joe Dodoo (Kosovo) Arb Manaj (Mali) Famoussa Koné (Nigeria) Toheeb Adewale
Ankaraspor	(Austria) Darko Bodul	(Cameroon) Eric Ayuk	(Ghana) Musah Mohammed	(Ghana) Umar Basit	(Nigeria) Bernard Bulbwa	(Nigeria) Sikiru Olatunbosun	(Norway) Marcus Pedersen	(Serbia) Jovan Blagojević	(Spain) Tomás Mejías	(Zimbabwe) Alec Mudimu	(Brazil) Thales Lira (Cameroon) Marc Mbamba (Cameroon) Mbilla Etame (Serbia) Miloš Stanojević
Balıkesirspor	(Central African Republic) Foxi Kéthévoama	(Croatia) Andrija Vuković	(Croatia) Antonio Mršić	(Ghana) Mahatma Otoo	(Kosovo) Arb Manaj	(Kosovo) Oltion Bilalli	(Nigeria) Abraham Nwankwo	(Serbia) Nemanja Mihajlović	(Slovenia) Roman Bezjak	(Ukraine) Jemal Kizilatesh	(Nigeria) Francis Ezeh
Bandırmaspor	(Benin) Mickaël Poté	(Bosnia and Herzegovina) Emir Halilović	(Democratic Republic of the Congo) vital bahati	(Guinea) Guy-Michel Landel	(Spain) Rubén Rayos	(Venezuela) Yonathan Del Valle					(Ivory Coast) Lacina Traoré (Mali) Mahamadou Ba (Romania) Gabriel Torje
Boluspor	(Albania) Gentian Selmani	(Azerbaijan) Araz Abdullayev	(Bosnia and Herzegovina) Haris Hajdarević	(Brazil) Marlinho	(Democratic Republic of the Congo) Kabongo Kasongo	(Ghana) Edwin Gyasi	(Netherlands) Rydell Poepon	(Paraguay) Orlando Mosquera	(Senegal) Papa Alioune Diouf		(Brazil) Felipe Trevizan (Serbia) Nemanja Mihajlović
Bursaspor											
Eskişehirspor	(Nigeria) Hamed Sholaja	(Nigeria) Sunday Alimi									
Giresunspor	(Brazil) Serginho	(Burkina Faso) Abdou Traoré	(Nigeria) Anthony Uzodimma	(Poland) Michał Nalepa	(Senegal) Ibrahima Baldé	(Senegal) Mamadou Diarra	(Serbia) Marko Milinković				(Cape Verde) Hélder Tavares (Gabon) Lévy Madinda
İstanbulspor	(Albania) Eduard Rroca	(Albania) Kristal Abazaj	(Brazil) Wellington	(Cameroon) Patrick Etoga	(Croatia) Marin Ljubić	(North Macedonia) Valon Ethemi	(Serbia) Amar Skrijelj				(Bosnia and Herzegovina) Aldin Čajić (Ghana) Kamal Issah (Senegal) Papa Diouf
Menemenspor	(Benin) Tidjani Anaane	(Kosovo) David Domgjoni	(Mali) Mahamadou Ba	(Mali) Mamadou Traoré	(Nigeria) Adamu Alhassan	(Nigeria) Rasheed Akanbi	(Nigeria) Simon Zenke	(Somalia) Omar Mohamed			(Albania) Gentian Selmani (Liberia) Mohammed Kamara (Nigeria) Sikiru Olatunbosun
Samsunspor	(Algeria) Jugurtha Hamroun	(Ivory Coast) Brice Dja Djédjé	(Ivory Coast) Kévin Boli	(Martinique) Mathias Coureur	(Montenegro) Vukan Savićević	(Portugal) Tomané					(Ghana) Edwin Gyasi (Guadeloupe) Ange-Freddy Plumain (Ivory Coast) Guy Serge Yaméogo
Tuzlaspor	(Bosnia and Herzegovina) Aldin Čajić	(Brazil) Alan Cariús	(Brazil) Thuram	(France) Samuel Yohou	(Slovenia) Matej Pučko	(Slovenia) Rajko Rotman	(Togo) Prince Segbefia				(Bosnia and Herzegovina) Faris Zubanović (Egypt) Aias Aosman (Nigeria) Chidiebere Nwakali (Senegal) Adama Sarr
Ümraniyespor	(Bosnia and Herzegovina) Avdija Vršajević	(Croatia) Ante Živković	(Croatia) Tomislav Glumac	(Gabon) Kévin Mayi	(Nigeria) Chukwuma Akabueze	(Nigeria) Lanre Kehinde	(Senegal) Adama Wade	(Senegal) Idrissa Camara	(Senegal) Moussa Sow		(Portugal) Vasco Fernandes

== League table ==
Pos	Team	Pld	W	D	L	GF	GA	GD	Pts	Qualification or relegation
1	Adana Demirspor (C, P)	34	21	7	6	64	27	+37	70	Promotion to the Süper Lig
2	Giresunspor (P)	34	21	7	6	54	25	+29	70	Promotion to the Süper Lig
3	Samsunspor	34	20	10	4	58	30	+28	70	Qualification for the Süper Lig Playoffs
4	İstanbulspor	34	19	7	8	62	34	+28	64	Qualification for the Süper Lig Playoffs
5	Altay (O, P)	34	20	3	11	66	39	+27	63	Qualification for the Süper Lig Playoffs
6	Altınordu	34	17	9	8	58	45	+13	60	Qualification for the Süper Lig Playoffs
7	Ankara Keçiörengücü	34	17	7	10	49	28	+21	58	
8	Ümraniyespor	34	14	9	11	46	43	+3	51	
9	Tuzlaspor	34	14	5	15	46	53	−7	47	
10	Bursaspor	34	14	4	16	56	57	−1	46	
11	Bandırmaspor	34	12	6	16	48	51	−3	42	
12	Boluspor	34	12	6	16	38	41	−3	42	
13	Balıkesirspor	34	9	8	17	35	53	−18	35	
14	Adanaspor	34	9	7	18	44	55	−11	34	
15	Menemenspor	34	7	13	14	38	62	−24	34	
16	Akhisarspor (R)	34	8	6	20	36	59	−23	30	Relegation to the TFF Second League
17	Ankaraspor (R)	34	6	8	20	33	61	−28	26	Relegation to the TFF Second League
18	Eskişehirspor (Note: Eskişehirspor have been deducted 3 points.) (R)	34	1	8	25	23	91	−68	8	Relegation to the TFF Second League

Source: TFF
Rules for classification: 1) Points; 2) Head-to-head points; 3) Head-to-head goal difference; 4) Head-to-head goals scored; 5) Goal difference; 6) Goals scored
(C) Champions; (O) Play-off winners; (P) Promoted; (R) Relegated

=== Positions by round ===
The table lists the positions of teams after each week of matches. In order to preserve chronological evolvements, any postponed matches are not included to the round at which they were originally scheduled, but added to the full round they were played immediately afterwards.

Team ╲ Round	1	2	3	4	5	6	7	8	9	10	11	12	13	14	15	16	17	18	19	20	21	22	23	24	25	26	27	28	29	30	31	32	33	34
Adana Demirspor	1	3	1	4	7	5	3	4	6	3	6	4	8	8	8	6	5	5	4	4	4	4	5	5	4	3	4	4	3	2	2	1	1	1
Giresunspor	17	17	11	8	9	7	7	10	8	8	8	7	7	4	2	2	1	1	1	1	1	1	1	1	1	1	1	1	1	1	1	2	2	2
Samsunspor	10	2	6	5	8	6	4	5	4	7	5	2	3	7	5	4	3	3	3	3	2	2	2	2	2	2	2	2	2	3	3	3	3	3
İstanbulspor	15	10	4	1	1	2	2	1	1	1	2	5	1	5	3	3	2	2	2	2	3	3	3	3	3	5	6	6	6	5	5	4	4	4
Altay	9	13	8	6	3	8	8	6	9	6	4	8	6	3	1	1	4	4	6	6	8	5	7	6	6	4	3	3	4	4	4	5	5	5
Altınordu	3	8	5	2	6	4	6	3	3	2	1	3	5	1	7	8	8	9	8	8	7	6	4	4	5	6	5	5	5	6	6	6	6	6
Ankara Keçiörengücü	6	1	3	7	4	3	5	7	7	4	3	1	2	6	4	7	7	6	7	7	5	7	6	8	8	7	7	7	7	7	7	7	7	7
Ümraniyespor	4	12	15	14	14	15	15	14	13	13	16	13	14	15	12	12	12	12	12	12	11	11	11	11	10	10	11	11	8	8	8	8	8	8
Tuzlaspor	11	5	2	3	2	1	1	2	2	5	7	6	4	2	6	5	6	8	5	5	6	8	8	7	7	8	8	8	9	9	9	9	9	9
Bursaspor	16	7	12	12	10	10	12	11	12	10	10	10	10	10	10	9	9	7	9	9	9	9	10	9	9	9	9	9	10	10	10	10	10	10
Bandırmaspor	12	9	10	13	13	13	14	15	15	15	14	16	16	12	11	11	10	10	10	10	10	10	9	10	11	11	10	10	11	11	11	11	11	11
Boluspor	13	14	16	17	18	18	17	17	17	16	15	12	11	11	13	13	13	13	13	13	15	15	15	13	12	12	12	12	12	12	12	12	12	12
Balıkesirspor	2	6	13	10	11	11	9	12	11	11	11	11	13	13	15	15	15	16	16	15	13	13	14	15	15	15	13	13	13	14	13	13	13	13
Adanaspor	5	4	7	9	5	9	10	8	5	9	9	9	9	9	9	10	11	11	11	11	12	12	12	12	13	13	14	14	14	13	14	14	14	14
Menemenspor	18	18	17	18	17	14	13	13	14	14	13	14	12	14	14	14	14	14	15	16	14	14	13	14	14	14	15	15	15	15	15	15	15	15
Akhisarspor	8	15	9	11	12	12	11	9	10	12	12	15	15	16	16	16	16	15	14	14	16	16	16	16	16	16	16	16	16	16	16	16	16	16
Ankaraspor	7	11	14	15	15	16	16	16	16	17	17	17	17	17	17	17	17	17	17	17	17	17	17	17	17	17	17	17	17	17	17	17	17	17
Eskişehirspor	14	16	18	16	16	17	18	18	18	18	18	18	18	18	18	18	18	18	18	18	18	18	18	18	18	18	18	18	18	18	18	18	18	18

Champion, Promotion to Süper Lig
Promotion to Süper Lig
Play-off
TFF Second League

Source: TFF

== Results ==
Home \ Away	ADS	ADA	AKH	ALT	ATO	AKG	ANK	BAL	BAN	BOL	BUR	ESK	GRS	İST	MEN	SAM	TUZ	ÜMR
Adana Demirspor	—	0–0	2–0	1–2	1–1	2–0	2–0	3–0	2–0	1–1	1–2	4–1	3–0	2–0	3–0	1–1	3–1	4–2
Adanaspor	2–2	—	3–1	1–4	5–2	0–0	1–2	1–1	1–2	2–3	0–3	5–2	0–4	1–0	3–0	0–2	1–3	0–2
Akhisarspor	2–3	0–1	—	2–0	1–1	1–2	0–1	2–0	1–0	2–2	2–1	3–0	0–1	0–1	0–0	1–4	0–0	1–1
Altay	1–0	4–1	2–1	—	1–3	0–4	3–0	1–3	4–3	0–1	3–1	6–0	1–1	1–3	3–0	0–0	5–0	3–1
Altınordu	0–1	1–1	3–2	2–1	—	0–2	2–0	0–0	2–0	2–1	0–2	6–3	0–0	1–0	2–4	0–0	3–2	1–0
Ankara Keçiörengücü	1–0	1–0	6–0	0–1	5–3	—	2–0	2–1	1–0	2–0	0–1	1–0	0–1	1–1	4–1	1–1	0–1	0–1
Ankaraspor	1–3	0–2	4–2	2–2	0–3	1–0	—	1–2	3–2	1–2	1–1	1–0	1–1	0–2	1–1	1–2	0–0	0–0
Balıkesirspor	0–1	0–3	3–0	0–3	0–5	1–2	2–2	—	2–1	0–0	3–0	2–2	3–1	1–2	2–1	1–3	0–2	1–1
Bandırmaspor	0–3	3–2	1–0	2–0	2–2	1–1	2–1	1–0	—	2–3	1–2	1–1	0–1	2–1	2–2	2–2	3–2	1–0
Boluspor	1–2	1–2	0–1	1–0	1–2	0–1	2–0	0–0	0–1	—	2–1	3–0	0–1	0–2	0–0	0–2	1–2	1–4
Bursaspor	1–3	1–0	3–2	1–3	1–2	0–3	3–1	3–1	2–1	4–2	—	2–1	1–2	1–2	0–1	3–0	0–0	1–3
Eskişehirspor	1–1	0–0	0–1	0–5	0–2	2–2	0–0	0–3	2–1	0–2	1–5	—	0–5	0–3	2–2	0–1	0–2	1–1
Giresunspor	2–0	4–3	3–0	1–2	2–0	2–1	1–0	1–0	0–1	2–1	2–1	2–0	—	0–0	1–1	0–0	3–0	0–1
İstanbulspor	3–1	1–0	2–2	2–1	1–2	0–0	5–3	5–0	2–1	1–1	3–3	3–0	1–1	—	4–0	0–1	2–1	2–3
Menemenspor	1–4	0–0	6–2	1–2	0–2	0–0	2–1	1–1	1–1	0–3	2–1	2–1	0–4	1–2	—	2–2	2–5	1–1
Samsunspor	0–2	2–1	1–0	1–0	1–1	4–2	3–1	1–0	3–1	1–0	4–1	6–1	0–2	0–3	1–1	—	2–0	3–0
Tuzlaspor	0–3	3–2	0–3	0–1	4–1	1–0	2–0	1–0	0–6	0–1	3–3	5–2	1–2	2–0	2–0	0–2	—	0–1
Ümraniyespor	0–0	1–0	2–1	0–1	1–1	1–2	4–3	1–2	2–1	0–2	2–1	3–0	3–1	1–3	0–2	2–2	1–1	—

Updated to match(es) played on 9 May 2021. Source: TFF
Legend: Blue = home team win; Yellow = draw; Red = away team win.

== Promotion playoffs ==
=== Semifinals ===
Team 1	Agg.	Team 2	1st leg	2nd leg
Altınordu	3–2	Samsunspor	1–0	2–2
Altay	4–2	İstanbulspor	3–2	1–0

First leg

17 May 2021
20:00

Altay	3–2	İstanbulspor
Leandro Kappel 3'; Marco Paixão 13', 43'	Report	10', 84' Onur Ergün

Bornova Stadium, Bornova, İzmir
Attendance: 0
Referee: Arda Kardeşler
18 May 2021
18:00

Altınordu	1–0	Samsunspor
Yusuf Yalçın Arslan 49'	Report

Bornova Stadium, Bornova, İzmir
Attendance: 0
Referee: Abdulkadir Bitigen

Second leg

22 May 2021
18:00

İstanbulspor	0–1	Altay
	Report	Deniz Kadah 84'

Necmi Kadıoğlu Stadium, Esenyurt, Istanbul
Attendance: 0
Referee: Ali Palabıyık
22 May 2021
21:00

Samsunspor	2–2	Altınordu
Nadir Çiftçi pen' (54); Yasin Öztekin 84'	Report	Metehan Mimaroğlu 33'; Enis Destan 90'

Samsun Stadium, Samsun
Attendance: 0
Referee: Yaşar Uğurlu

=== Final ===
Team 1	Score	Team 2
Altay	1–0	Altınordu

26 May 2021
20:00

Altay	1–0	Altınordu
Marco Paixao 89'	Report

Atatürk Olympic Stadium, Istanbul
Attendance: 0
Referee: Cüneyt Çakır

=== Top goalscorers ===
As of matches played 9 May 2021

Top goalscorers
Rank	Player	Team	Goals
1	(Portugal) Marco Paixão	Altay	22
2	(Senegal) Ibrahima Baldé	Giresunspor	19
3	(Serbia) Ognjen Ožegović	Adanaspor	14
3	(Brazil) Thuram	Tuzlaspor	14
5	(Turkey) Onur Ergün	İstanbulspor	12
5	(Turkey) Enis Destan	Altınordu	12
5	(Netherlands) Hasan Kılıç	Adana Demirspor	12
8	(Germany) Cem Ekinci	Ankara Keçiörengücü	11
9	(Turkey) Ali Akman	Bursaspor	10
9	(Kosovo) Arb Manaj	Balıkesirspor	10
9	(Turkey) Ahmet İlhan Özek	Altınordu	10
