= 2023–24 Eyüpspor season =

Eyüpspor
2023–24 season
- Manager: Arda Turan
- Stadium: Eyüp Stadium
- TFF First League: Ongoing
- Turkish Cup: Pre-season

The 2023–24 season was Eyüpspor's 105th season in existence and third consecutive in the TFF First League, the second division of Turkish football. They also competed in the Turkish Cup.

== Players ==
=== First-team squad ===
As of 23 September 2023

Note: Flags indicate national team as defined under FIFA eligibility rules; some limited exceptions apply. Players may hold more than one non-FIFA nationality.

No.	Pos.	Nation	Player
1	GK	TUR	Berke Özer
4	DF	BRA	Luccas Claro
5	DF	TUR	Fethi Özer
6	MF	GER	Robin Yalçın
7	MF	TUR	Murat Uçar
9	FW	TUR	Mustafa Pektemek
11	MF	MAR	Adrien Regattin
13	GK	TUR	Birkan Tetik
15	DF	TUR	Uğur Demirok
16	FW	ANG	Fredy
19	DF	TUR	Ömer Bayram
20	MF	TUR	Recep Niyaz
23	FW	TUR	Ahmed Kutucu

No.	Pos.	Nation	Player
26	GK	TUR	Alp Köseer
28	MF	AZE	Taşkın İlter
40	MF	GHA	Prince Ampem
44	DF	UZB	Jakhongir Urozov
57	MF	TUR	Melih Kabasakal
70	FW	TUR	Mete Demir
77	MF	SLO	Svit Sešlar
80	FW	NGR	Francis Ezeh
88	DF	TUR	Caner Erkin
90	DF	TUR	Metehan Baltacı (on loan from Galatasaray)
91	MF	TUR	Bekir Yılmaz
92	GK	TUR	Kubilay Anteplioğlu
99	FW	BEL	Gianni Bruno

=== Other players under contract ===
Note: Flags indicate national team as defined under FIFA eligibility rules; some limited exceptions apply. Players may hold more than one non-FIFA nationality.

No.	Pos.	Nation	Player
—	DF	TUR	Kerem Çeçen
—	DF	TUR	Furkan Çolak
—	MF	TUR	Görkem Efe Özen
—	FW	TUR	Berkay Kumlu

No.	Pos.	Nation	Player
—	FW	MLI	Aly Mallé
—	FW	TUR	Efecan Mirzaoğlu
—	FW	TUR	Numan Savaç

=== Out on loan ===
Note: Flags indicate national team as defined under FIFA eligibility rules; some limited exceptions apply. Players may hold more than one non-FIFA nationality.

No.	Pos.	Nation	Player
—	GK	TUR	Burak Diker (at Bulvarspor until 30 June 2024)
—	DF	TUR	Abdülkadır Aydın (at Karaköprü Belediyespor until 30 June 2024)
—	DF	TUR	Mustafa Eren Damar (at Mardin 1969 SK until 30 June 2024)
—	DF	AUT	Berkay Doğan (at Sarıyer until 30 June 2024)
—	DF	TUR	Erdem Gökçe (at Iğdır until 30 June 2024)
—	DF	TUR	Ahmet Özkaya (at Vanspor until 30 June 2024)
—	DF	TUR	Muhammet Yeşil (at Amed until 30 June 2024)
—	MF	TUR	Can Bayırkan (at Sultanbeyli Belediyespor until 30 June 2024)
—	MF	TUR	Buğra Çağlıyan (at İskenderunspor until 30 June 2024)
—	MF	TUR	İsmail Can Fidan (at Tokat Belediye Plevnespor until 30 June 2024)
—	MF	GER	Sinan Kurt (at Sakaryaspor until 30 June 2024)

No.	Pos.	Nation	Player
—	MF	TUR	Mikail Okyar (at Sakaryaspor until 30 June 2024)
—	MF	LUX	Olivier Thill (at Sanliurfaspor until 30 June 2024)
—	FW	TUR	Halil Akbunar (at Pendikspor until 30 June 2024)
—	FW	TUR	Metehan Mimaroğlu (at Bandirmaspor until 30 June 2024)
—	FW	TUR	Harun Özcan (at Arnavutköy Belediyespor until 30 June 2024)
—	FW	TUR	Mustafa Sarıgözoğlu (at Tokat Belediye Plevnespor until 30 June 2024)
—	FW	AUS	Al Hassan Toure (at Sanliurfaspor until 30 June 2024)
—	FW	TUR	Erencan Yardımcı (at Pendikspor until 30 June 2024)
—	FW	TUR	Ahmet Yazar (at Tuzlaspor until 30 June 2024)
—	FW	TUR	Arda Yumurtacı (at Silivrispor until 30 June 2024)

== Transfers ==
=== In ===
Pos.	Player	Transferred from	Fee	Date	Source
MF	(Slovenia) Svit Sešlar	(Slovenia) Olimpija Ljubljana	€2,500,000	29 August 2023	
MF	(Angola) Fredy	(Turkey) Antalyaspor	Undisclosed	1 September 2023	
MF	(Turkey) Mikail Okyar	(Turkey) Sakaryaspor	Loan return	11 January 2024	
FW	(Germany) Sinan Gümüş	(Turkey) Antalyaspor	Free	11 January 2024	
MF	(Spain) Samuel Sáiz	(Turkey) Sivasspor	Undisclosed	16 January 2024	

=== Out ===
Pos.	Player	Transferred to	Fee	Date	Source
MF	(Turkey) Mikail Okyar	(Turkey) Ankara Keçiörengücü	Loan	12 January 2024	

== Pre-season and friendlies ==
Win Draw Loss Fixtures

July 2023 Friendly	(Turkey)	v	(Turkey)

== Competitions ==
=== Overall record ===
Competition	First match	Last match	Starting round	Record							
Competition	First match	Last match	Starting round	Pld	W	D	L	GF	GA	GD	Win %
TFF First League	August 2023	10 May 2024	Matchday 1	0	0	0	0	0	0	+0	—
Turkish Cup	TBD		Second round	0	0	0	0	0	0	+0	—
Total				0	0	0	0	0	0	+0	—

Last updated: August 2023
Source: Soccerway

=== TFF First League ===
==== League table ====
Pos	Team	Pld	W	D	L	GF	GA	GD	Pts	Qualification or relegation
1	Eyüpspor (P)	34	24	3	7	77	31	+46	75	Promotion to the Süper Lig
2	Göztepe (P)	34	21	7	6	60	20	+40	70	Promotion to the Süper Lig
3	Sakaryaspor	34	17	9	8	50	35	+15	60	Qualification for the Süper Lig Playoff Final
4	Bodrum (O, P)	34	15	12	7	43	22	+21	57	Qualification for the Süper Lig Playoff Quarter Finals
5	Çorum	34	16	8	10	55	36	+19	56	Qualification for the Süper Lig Playoff Quarter Finals

Updated to match(es) played on 11 May 2024. Source: TFF
Rules for classification: 1) Points; 2) Head-to-head points; 3) Head-to-head goal difference; 4) Head-to-head goals scored; 5) Goal difference; 6) Goals scored
(O) Play-off winners; (P) Promoted

==== Results summary ====
Overall								Home						Away					
Pld	W	D	L	GF	GA	GD	Pts	W	D	L	GF	GA	GD	W	D	L	GF	GA	GD
0	0	0	0	0	0	0	0	0	0	0	0	0	0	0	0	0	0	0	0

Last updated: August 2023.

==== Results by round ====
Round	1
Ground	
Result	
Position	

Updated to match(es) played on August 2023. Source:
A = Away; H = Home; W = Win; D = Draw; L = Loss

==== Matches ====
The league fixtures were unveiled on 19 July 2023.

12 August 2023 1	Ankara Keçiörengücü	0–1	Eyüpspor	Ankara
17:00			Erkin 58'	Stadium: Aktepe Stadium; Referee: Emre Kargın

21 August 2023 2	Eyüpspor	2–0	Kocaelispor	Istanbul
21:00	Kutucu 45'; Erkin 87'		Gültekin (red card) 84'	Stadium: Eyüp Stadı; Referee: Alpaslan Şen

26 August 2023 3	Tuzlaspor	0–5	Eyüpspor	Istanbul
17:00				Stadium: Sancaktepe Stadium; Referee: Alper Akarsu

2 September 2023 4	Eyüpspor	3–1	Giresunspor	Istanbul
21:45				Stadium: Eyüp Stadı; Referee: Ömer Turtay

17 September 2023 5	Gençlerbirliği	1–3	Eyüpspor

22 September 2023 6	Eyüpspor	2–0	Ümraniyespor	Istanbul
				Stadium: Eyüp Stadı

1 October 2023 7	Sakaryaspor	2–0	Eyüpspor

7 October 2023 8	Eyüpspor	3–0	Bodrum	Istanbul
				Stadium: Eyüp Stadı

22 October 2023 9	Çorum	2–3	Eyüpspor

29 October 2023 10	Eyüpspor	0–1	Bandırmaspor	Istanbul
				Stadium: Eyüp Stadı

5 November 2023 11	Eyüpspor	4–1	Adanaspor	Istanbul
				Stadium: Eyüp Stadı

11 November 2023 12	Altay	1–7	Eyüpspor

26 November 2023 13	Eyüpspor	2–1	Manisa	Istanbul
				Stadium: Eyüp Stadı

2 December 2023 14	Boluspor	0–3	Eyüpspor

10 December 2023 15	Eyüpspor	4–0	Şanlıurfaspor	Istanbul
				Stadium: Eyüp Stadı

20 December 2023 16	Göztepe	5–1	Eyüpspor

25 December 2023 17	Eyüpspor	3–0	Erzurumspor	Istanbul
				Stadium: Eyüp Stadı

13 January 2024 18	Eyüpspor	2–0	Ankara Keçiörengücü	Istanbul
				Stadium: Eyüp Stadı

20 January 2024 19	Kocaelispor	2–1	Eyüpspor

27 January 2024 20	Eyüpspor	4–0	Tuzlaspor	Istanbul
				Stadium: Eyüp Stadı

4 February 2024 21	Giresunspor	0–0	Eyüpspor

12 February 2024 22	Eyüpspor	1–0	Gençlerbirliği	Istanbul
				Stadium: Eyüp Stadı

18 February 2024 23	Ümraniyespor	1–3	Eyüpspor

25 February 2024 24	Eyüpspor	v	Sakaryaspor	Istanbul
19:00				Stadium: Eyüp Stadı
