= Olgun =

Olgun is both a Turkish given name and a surname. Notable people with the name include:

- Olgun Şimşek, Turkish actor
- Bayram Olgun, Turkish footballer
- Süleyman Olgun, Turkish footballer

== See also ==
- Olgun, Ergani
- Olgun, Olur
