= Younès Belhanda =

Footballer (born 1990)

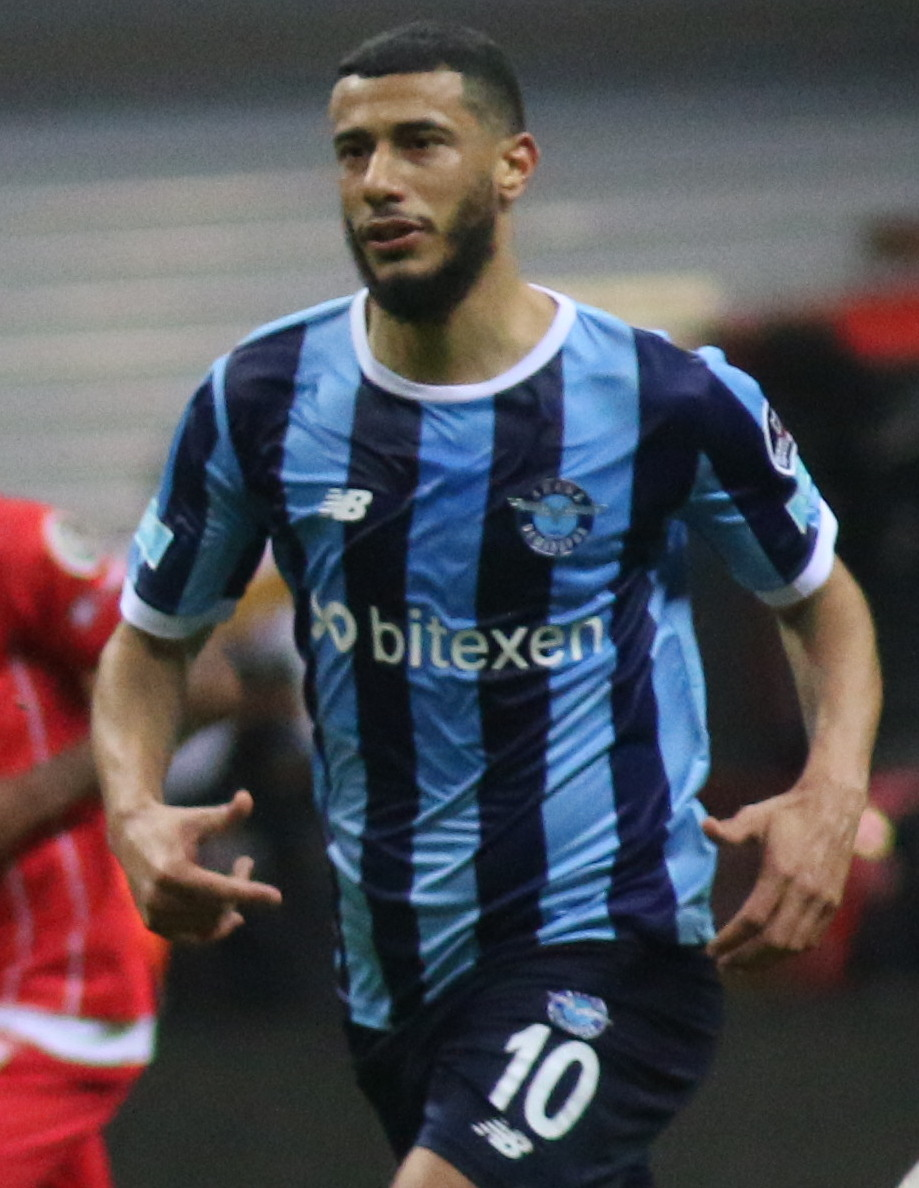
- Belhanda with Adana Demirspor in 2022

Personal information
- Full name: Younès Belhanda
- Date of birth: 25 February 1990 (age 36)
- Place of birth: Avignon, France
- Height: 1.78 m (5 ft 10 in)
- Position: Attacking midfielder

Team information
- Current team: Al-Sailiya
- Number: 20

Youth career
- 1997–1998: RC Aramonais
- 1998–2003: MJC Avignon
- 2003–2009: Montpellier

Senior career*
Years	Team	Apps	(Gls)
2009–2013	Montpellier	127	(26)
2013–2017	Dynamo Kyiv	56	(8)
2016	→ Schalke 04 (loan)	15	(2)
2016–2017	→ Nice (loan)	31	(3)
2017–2021	Galatasaray	99	(18)
2021–2023	Adana Demirspor	66	(18)
2024–2026	Al-Shamal	38	(4)
2026–	Al-Sailiya	1	(0)

International career^{‡}
2010	France U20	2	(0)
2010–2022	Morocco	59	(5)
- * Club domestic league appearances and goals as of 9 January 2025 (UTC) ‡ National team caps and goals as of 23 August 2023

Younès Belhanda (Arabic: يونس بلهندة; born 25 February 1990) is a professional footballer who plays as an attacking midfielder for Qatar Stars League club Al-Sailiya. Born in France, he played for the Morocco national team.

== Early life ==
Belhanda was born in Avignon, a commune in southeastern France, and was raised in nearby Aramon. He is of Moroccan descent (from Taza) and has five other siblings.

Belhanda began his football career playing for hometown club Racing Club Aramon. He spent one year at the club before joining MJC Avignon, a local cultural center based in his birthplace. While at the club, Belhanda was utilized as a libero and mentored by trainer Jean-Christophe Gleyze. The player admitted that Gleyze played a huge part in determining his future, stating: "he is more than a coach. Since my father worked and I lived in the Gard, it was him who took me to training and my home for three years. Without him and MJC Avignon, I would never have been spotted by other clubs".

At the age of 13, Belhanda was scouted by several professional clubs, most notably Lyon, Marseille, Montpellier, and Saint-Étienne. He ultimately decided to join Saint-Étienne, but changed his mind after discussing the move with his parents, who recommended that he join Montpellier in order to remain close to home.

== Club career ==
=== Montpellier ===
While in Montpellier's youth academy, Belhanda was converted into a defensive midfielder. He spent five years in the club's academy developing alongside fellow youth teammates Benjamin Stambouli, Abdelhamid El Kaoutari, and Rémy Cabella. Towards the end of the 2007–08 season, Belhanda was promoted to the club's reserve team, which was playing in the Championnat de France amateur (CFA), the fourth level of French football. In the ensuing season, he simultaneously played on the reserve team and with the club's under-19 team in the Coupe Gambardella, the national youth cup competition in France. In the latter competition, Montpellier won the title, capturing its second Gambardella cup. Belhanda appeared in all six matches the team contested. In the final, he played the entire match as Montpellier defeated Nantes 2–0.

==== 2009–10 season ====
As a result of the under-19 team's cup success, several of the members of the squad were awarded professional contracts. Belhanda was among them and, on 27 July 2009, agreed to a three-year deal. He was, subsequently, promoted to the senior team by new incoming manager René Girard and assigned the number 29 shirt. Despite being brought up under a defensive mentality, Girard preferred to utilize Belhanda as an attacker by placing him on the left side of the team's 4–2–3–1 formation. Girard gave his reasons for converting Belhanda stating "his desire to get on the ball combined with excellent technique means he can play through the middle or on the wings". He subsequently likened the player to former France international Robert Pires.

Belhanda made his professional debut in the team's opening league match of the 2009–10 season against Paris Saint-Germain. The match ended 1–1 with French media outlet La Provence describing the match as a "baptism of fire" for Belhanda. The midfielder admitted to having nerves declaring "I was playing against Makélélé, a player I admired when I was little. These are moments to live. I had pressure; I used to play in front of 200 or 300 people in the CFA". On 19 September 2009, Belhanda scored his first professional goal in a 4–2 defeat to Marseille at the Stade Vélodrome. In his next eight matches with the team, he featured as a starter. On 11 November, he assisted on Montpellier's only goal, scored by Víctor Montaño, in a 1–1 draw with Valenciennes. On 13 January 2010, Belhanda received his first red card after incurring a second yellow card in a 4–0 loss away to Monaco. After starting in the team's 1–0 win over Lens on 20 January,

==== 2010–11 season ====
Belhanda opened the 2010–11 campaign by making his European debut on 29 July 2010 in the first leg of Montpellier's UEFA Europa League third qualifying round with Hungarian club Győri ETO. He started the match, but was substituted out after 71 minutes as the match finished 1–0. In the second leg, Montpellier were defeated losing on penalties after the match finished 1–0 in favor of Győri in regular and extra time. Belhanda appeared as a second-half substitute in the match and did not attempt a penalty in the shootout. On 19 August, he signed a two-year contract extension with Montpellier until 2014. In the league, Belhanda appeared as a substitute in the team's first two matches of the campaign. He made his first start on 22 August in a 0–0 draw with Caen. On 16 October, Belhanda scored his first goal of the season in a 2–0 victory over Sochaux. He went another two months without scoring before converting the opening goal in a 1–1 draw with Auxerre.

In the Coupe de la Ligue, Montpellier surprisingly reached the final of the competition. Belhanda appeared as a substitute in the team's first two matches of the competition, but was inserted as a starter in the team's 1–0 semi-final extra time win over Paris Saint-Germain. The win over Les Parisiens sent Montpellier to its first major final since the 1993–94 season when the club reached the final of the Coupe de France. In the final, Montpellier faced Marseille and were defeated 1–0 courtesy of a goal by Taye Taiwo. Belhanda played the entire match.

On 20 February 2011, Belhanda assisted on Olivier Giroud's first goal in Montpellier's 2–2 draw with Paris Saint-Germain. A month later, he scored the match-winning goal against the eventual league champions Lille.

==== 2011–12 season ====
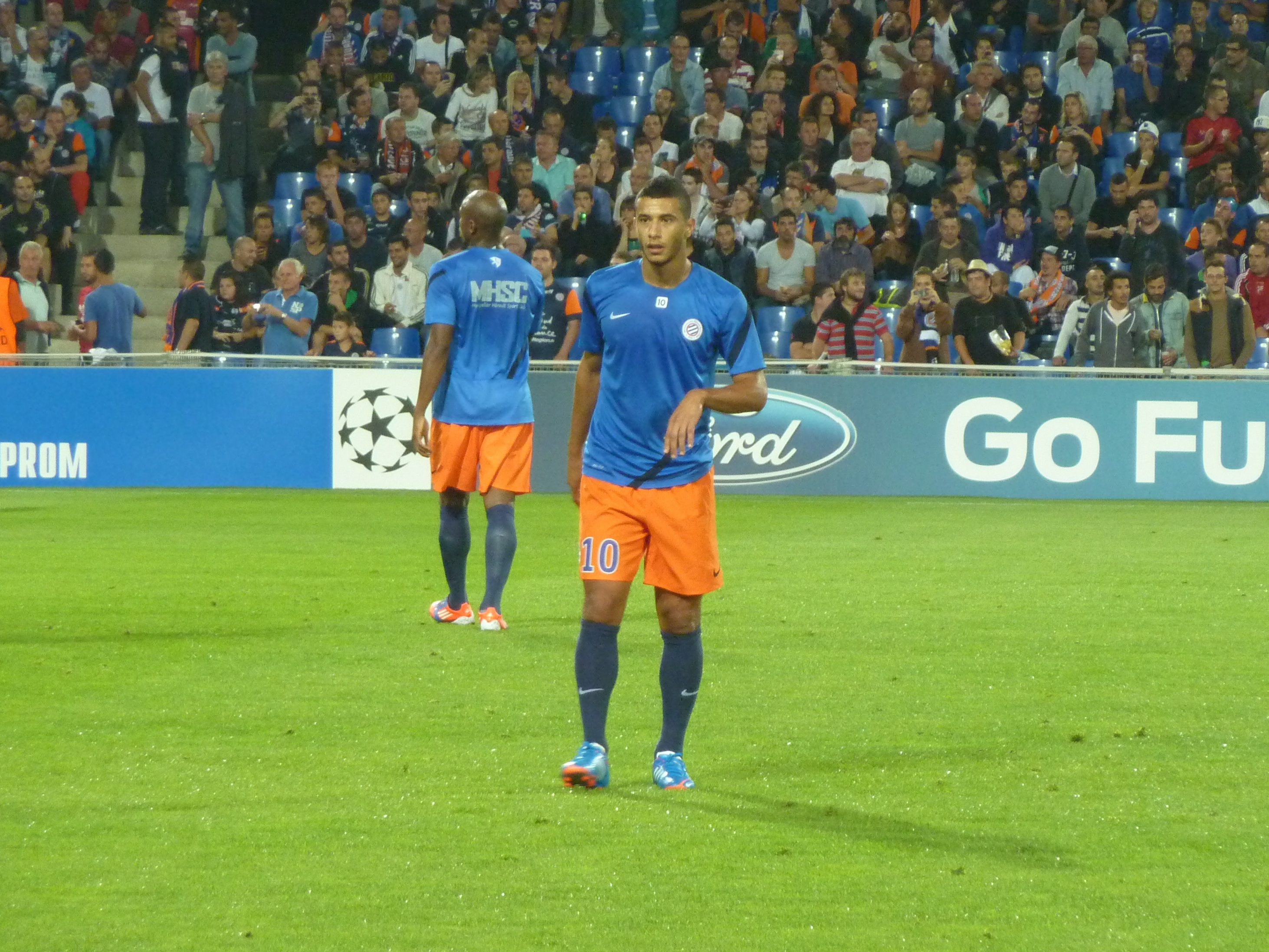
Younès Belhanda 18 September 2012, in the UEFA Champions League

Following the disappointing campaign, Girard sought to change the team's style of play. One of his changes was to move Belhanda into the playmaker position just behind the striker. To coincide with the position switch, Belhanda was given the number ten shirt. The move was ultimately a success as Belhanda opened the campaign scoring two goals in his first three matches in wins over Auxerre and Rennes. On 27 August 2011, in a 2–1 defeat to Lyon, Belhanda received a straight red card after kicking out at Lyon midfielder Miralem Pjanić following a challenge. He returned to the team following the September international break and, after two matches, scored his third goal of the season in a 2–2 draw with Bordeaux. Two weeks later, Belhanda scored and assisted on a goal in a 3–1 away win against Caen. For his performances in the month of November, Belhanda was awarded the UNFP Player of the Month award.

Belhanda went scoreless for the next two months, though he did assist on an Olivier Giroud goal in a 3–1 win over Sochaux. On 21 December, in his final match before departing the club to participate in the 2012 Africa Cup of Nations, Belhanda scored the opening goal in a league match against Evian in the 47th minute. Minutes later, he assisted on a goal by Giroud to put Montpellier up 2–1. However, Montpellier were unable to retain the lead after conceding three second-half goals to lose 4–2. Belhanda returned to the team on 4 February 2012 appearing as a substitute in a 1–0 win over Brest. Fours days later, Belhanda returned to the starting lineup against Châteauroux in the Coupe de France. In the match, he scored the final goal in a 2–0 win. On 11 February, he converted a penalty in a 3–0 win against Ajaccio. A week later, against first place Paris Saint-Germain, Belhanda scored the equalizing goal just before half-time to draw the match at 1–1. The match eventually finished 2–2 after Montpellier and Paris Saint-Germain each scored a second-half goal.

On 20 May 2012, for the first time in the club's history, Montpellier HSC won the Ligue 1 title.

=== Dynamo Kyiv ===
Belhanda with Dynamo Kyiv in 2014

On 1 July 2013, Ukrainian club Dynamo Kyiv announced the signing of Belhanda on a 5-year contract. Media reports had previously linked him with a move to Premier League sides Manchester United, Arsenal, Tottenham and Aston Villa. Belhanda was assigned shirt number 90. His contract with Montpellier was due to expire in June 2014, with his transfer fee believed to be in the region of €10 million.

In the 2014–15 season, Belhanda helped Dynamo reach the 1/4 final of the UEFA Europa League, getting eliminated by ACF Fiorentina 1–3 on aggregate, as well as winning the Ukrainian Premier League and the Ukrainian Cup. In the 2015/16 season, Belhanda helped Dynamo reach the last 16 of the UEFA Champions League for the first time in 16 years.

==== Schalke 04 (loan) ====
On 5 January 2016, Belhanda was loaned out to German club FC Schalke 04 until the end of the season.

==== Nice (loan) ====
On 31 August 2016, Belhanda signed for French club Nice on loan.

=== Galatasaray ===
On 28 June 2017, Belhanda signed for Turkish club Galatasaray S.K., where he will wear the number '10' shirt previously worn by former Galatasaray player Wesley Sneijder.

On 10 March 2021, Galatasaray unilaterally terminated Belhanda's contract with immediate effect, after he criticized the pitch conditions at Türk Telekom Stadium in a televised post-match interview and told club executives to focus on the pitch rather than social media.

=== Adana Demirspor ===
On 1 July 2021, Belhanda signed a three-year contract with recently promoted to Süper Lig club Adana Demirspor.

In December 2023, after having scored 19 goals in 74 appearances for the Adana-based side, Belhanda's contract was terminated by mutual agreement.

=== Al-Shamal ===
On 18 January 2024, Belhanda joined Qatar Stars League club Al-Shamal.

=== Al-Sailiya ===
On 14 January 2026, Belhanda joined Qatar Stars League club Al-Sailiya.

== International career ==
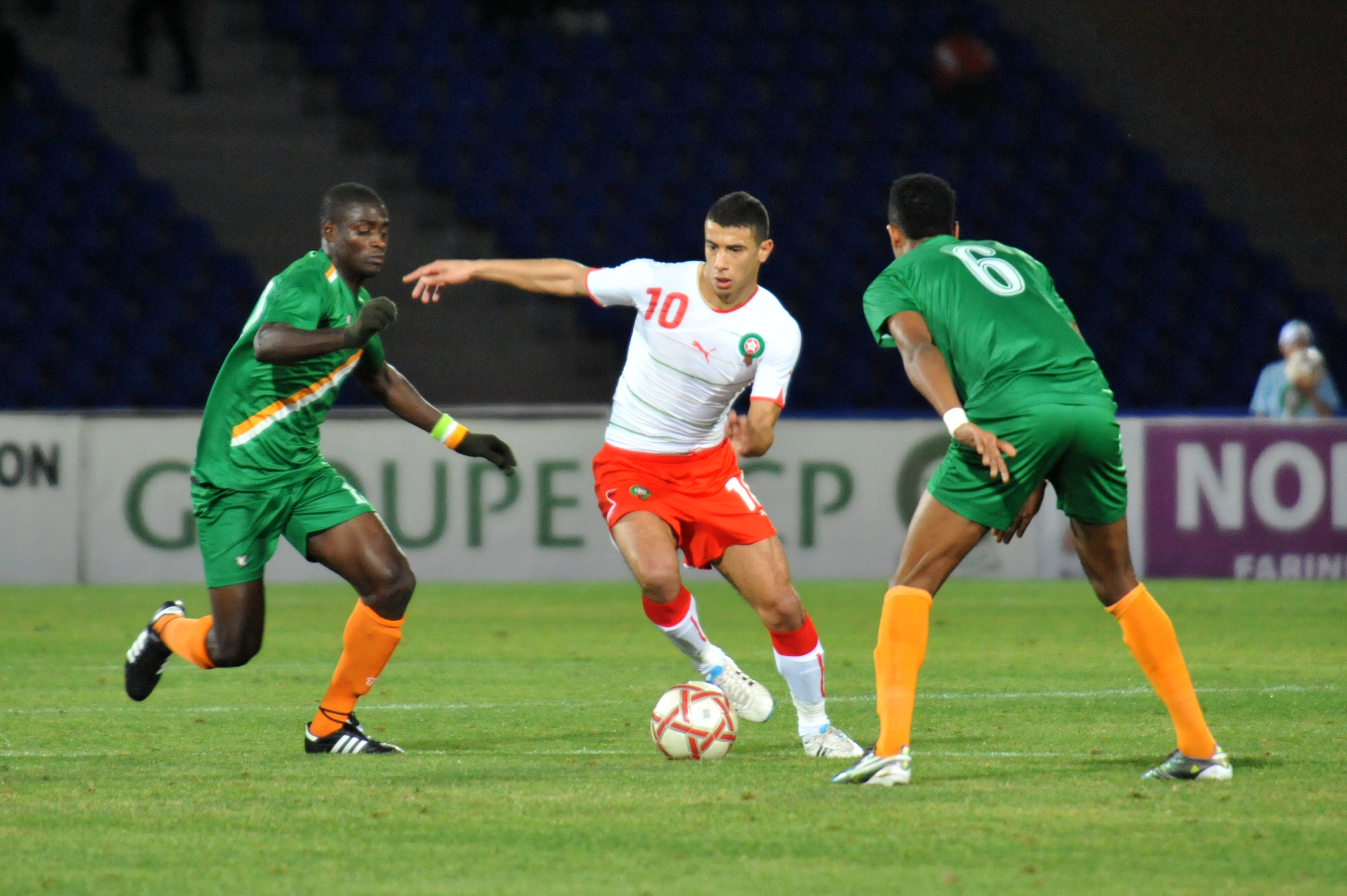
Younès Belhanda representing Morocco against Niger

In May 2018, Belhanda was named in Morocco's 23-man squad for the 2018 FIFA World Cup in Russia. Belhanda started in all three matches as Morocco were eliminated in the group stage.

He was excluded from manager Walid Regragui’s 26-man squad for the 2022 FIFA World Cup.

== Career statistics ==
=== Club ===
As of match played 19 December 2023

Appearances and goals by club, season and competition
Club	Season	League			National cup (Note: Includes Coupe de France, Ukrainian Cup, Turkish Cup)		League cup (Note: Includes Coupe de la Ligue)		Continental		Other		Total	
Club	Season	Division	Apps	Goals	Apps	Goals	Apps	Goals	Apps	Goals	Apps	Goals	Apps	Goals
Montpellier	2009–10	Ligue 1	33	1	0	0	1	0	—		—		34	1
Montpellier	2010–11	Ligue 1	36	3	0	0	4	0	2 (Note: Appearances in UEFA Europa League)	0	—		42	3
Montpellier	2011–12	Ligue 1	28	12	2	1	1	0	—		—		31	13
Montpellier	2012–13	Ligue 1	30	10	0	0	1	0	6 (Note: Appearances in UEFA Champions League)	2	—		37	12
Montpellier	Total		127	26	2	1	7	0	8	2	—		144	29
Dynamo Kyiv	2013–14	Ukrainian Premier League	22	6	3	0	—		8	1	—		33	8
Dynamo Kyiv	2014–15	Ukrainian Premier League	24	2	7	1	—		9	1	1 (Note: Appearance in Ukrainian Super Cup)	0	41	4
Dynamo Kyiv	2015–16	Ukrainian Premier League	10	0	2	0	—		2	0	—		14	0
Dynamo Kyiv	Total		56	8	12	1	—		19	2	1	0	88	12
Schalke 04 (loan)	2015–16	Bundesliga	15	2	0	0	—		2	0	—		17	2
Nice (loan)	2016–17	Ligue 1	31	3	0	0	0	0	5	0	—		36	3
Galatasaray	2017–18	Süper Lig	30	3	4	0	—		1	0	—		35	3
Galatasaray	2018–19	Süper Lig	24	4	4	0	—		6 (Note: Four appearances in UEFA Champions League, two appearances in UEFA Europa League)	0	1 (Note: Appearance in Turkish Super Cup)	0	35	4
Galatasaray	2019–20	Süper Lig	23	5	5	1	—		4	0	1	1	33	7
Galatasaray	2020–21	Süper Lig	22	6	3	1	—		3	1	—		28	8
Galatasaray	Total		99	18	16	2	—		14	1	2	1	131	22
Adana Demirspor	2021–22	Süper Lig	22	3	2	1	—		—		—		24	4
Adana Demirspor	2022–23	Süper Lig	30	12	0	0	—		—		—		30	12
Adana Demirspor	2023–24	Süper Lig	14	3	0	0	—		6 (Note: Appearances in UEFA Europa Conference League)	0	—		20	3
Adana Demirspor	Total		66	18	2	1	—		6	0	—		74	19
Career total			394	75	32	5	7	0	54	5	3	1	490	87

=== International ===
As of match played 27 September 2022.

National team	Year	Apps	Goals
Morocco	2010	1	0
Morocco	2011	8	0
Morocco	2012	8	1
Morocco	2013	7	1
Morocco	2014	7	1
Morocco	2015	2	0
Morocco	2016	3	0
Morocco	2017	7	0
Morocco	2018	9	2
Morocco	2019	6	0
Morocco	2020	0	0
Morocco	2021	0	0
Morocco	2022	1	0
Total		59	5

Scores and results list Morocco's goal tally first.

No.	Date	Venue	Opponent	Score	Result	Competition
1	31 January 2012	Stade d'Angondjé, Libreville, Gabon	Niger	1–0	1–0	2012 Africa Cup of Nations
2	15 June 2013	Marrakesh Stadium, Marrakesh, Morocco	Gambia	2–0	2–0	2014 FIFA World Cup qualification
3	7 September 2014	Stade Mohammed V, Casablanca, Morocco	Libya	1–0	3–0	Friendly
4	4 June 2018	Stade de Genève, Geneva, Switzerland	Slovakia	2–1	2–1	Friendly
5	9 June 2018	A. Le Coq Arena, Tallinn, Estonia	Estonia	1–0	3–1	Friendly

== Honours ==
Montpellier

- Ligue 1: 2011–12

Dynamo Kyiv

- Ukrainian Premier League: 2014–15, 2015–16
- Ukrainian Cup: 2013–14, 2014–15

Galatasaray

- Süper Lig: 2017–18, 2018–19
- Turkish Cup: 2018–19
- Turkish Super Cup: 2019

Individual

- UNFP Ligue 1 Team of the Year: 2011–12
- Ligue 1 Goal of the Year: 2011–12
- Ligue 1 Young Player of the Year: 2011–12
- Marc-Vivien Foé Award: 2011–12
- CAF Team of the Year: 2012
- Süper Lig Team of the Season: 2021–22
