= Jakub Kosecki =

Polish footballer (born 1990)

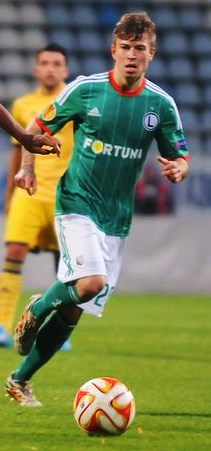
- Kosecki with Legia Warsaw in 2014

Personal information
- Date of birth: 29 August 1990 (age 36)
- Place of birth: Warsaw, Poland
- Height: 1.68 m (5 ft 6 in)
- Position: Winger

Team information
- Current team: Kosa Konstancin
- Number: 10

Youth career
- Nantes
- Montpellier
- Chicago Fire
- 2001–2008: Kosa Konstancin
- 2008–2009: Legia Warsaw

Senior career*
| Years | Team | Apps | (Gls) |
| 2009–2016 | Legia Warsaw | 67 | (12) |
| 2010–2011 | → ŁKS Łódź (loan) | 28 | (11) |
| 2012 | → Lechia Gdańsk (loan) | 8 | (2) |
| 2015–2016 | → SV Sandhausen (loan) | 17 | (2) |
| 2016–2017 | SV Sandhausen | 20 | (2) |
| 2017–2018 | Śląsk Wrocław | 27 | (5) |
| 2018–2020 | Adana Demirspor | 43 | (1) |
| 2021 | Cracovia | 8 | (0) |
| 2022 | Motor Lublin | 11 | (0) |
| 2022–2024 | Weszło Warsaw | 32 | (19) |
| 2024–2025 | KS Raszyn | 7 | (3) |
| 2025– | Kosa Konstancin | 14 | (2) |

International career
| 2010 | Poland U21 | 1 | (0) |
| 2012–2013 | Poland | 5 | (1) |
- * Club domestic league appearances and goals as of 17:37, 30 June 2026 (UTC)

Jakub Kosecki (Polish pronunciation: [ˈjakup kɔˈsɛt͡skʲi]; born 29 August 1990) is a Polish professional footballer who plays as a winger for Klasa A club Kosa Konstancin.

== Career ==
Having been around the world in various youth teams as a child, in March 2009, Kosecki moved to Legia Warsaw.

He was loaned out several times at Legia; in July 2010, he was loaned to ŁKS Łódź, and returned to Legia one year later; in 2012 he was loaned to Lechia Gdańsk and in 2015, Kosecki was loaned to SV Sandhausen.

After a successful loan spell, on 6 August 2016, he joined Sandhausen permanently on a two-year contract. He returned to Poland when on 22 June 2017 he signed a contract with Śląsk Wrocław.

On 24 July 2018 he signed a contract with Turkish side Adana Demirspor, where he reached the promotion play-off finals, with the team losing out to Hatayspor, although he missed the finals themselves due to injury. After only 6 appearances in the 2020-21 season he left in February 2021 after terminating his contract by mutual consent. In February 2021, he signed a deal with the Polish Ekstraklasa side Cracovia.

On 1 February 2022, he signed a contract with II liga club Motor Lublin until the end of the 2021–22 season, with an option to extend for another season.

On 11 July 2022, Kosecki joined V liga side Weszło Warsaw.

== Personal life ==
He is the son of former Poland international Roman Kosecki.

== Career statistics ==
=== Club ===
As of match played 29 March 2026

Appearances and goals by club, season and competition
| Club | Season | League | | | National cup (Note: Includes Polish Cup, DFB-Pokal, Turkish Cup) | | Europe | | Other | | Total | |
| Club | Season | Division | Apps | Goals | Apps | Goals | Apps | Goals | Apps | Goals | Apps | Goals |
|---|---|---|---|---|---|---|---|---|---|---|---|---|
| Legia Warsaw | 2009–10 | Ekstraklasa | 2 | 0 | 1 | 0 | — | | — | | 3 | 0 |
| Legia Warsaw | 2011–12 | Ekstraklasa | 4 | 0 | 1 | 0 | 2 (Note: Appearances in UEFA Europa League) | 0 | — | | 7 | 0 |
| Legia Warsaw | 2012–13 | Ekstraklasa | 25 | 9 | 3 | 0 | 6 | 2 | 1 (Note: Appearance in Polish Super Cup) | 0 | 35 | 11 |
| Legia Warsaw | 2013–14 | Ekstraklasa | 14 | 0 | 1 | 1 | 8 (Note: Five appearances in UEFA Champions League, three appearances in UEFA Europa League) | 2 | — | | 23 | 3 |
| Legia Warsaw | 2014–15 | Ekstraklasa | 20 | 3 | 4 | 2 | 11 (Note: Four appearances in UEFA Champions League, seven appearances in UEFA Europa League) | 1 | 1 | 0 | 36 | 6 |
| Legia Warsaw | 2016–17 | Ekstraklasa | 2 | 0 | 0 | 0 | — | | 1 | 0 | 3 | 0 |
| Legia Warsaw | Total | | 67 | 12 | 10 | 3 | 27 | 5 | 3 | 0 | 107 | 20 |
| ŁKS Łódź (loan) | 2010–11 | I liga | 28 | 11 | 2 | 1 | — | | — | | 30 | 12 |
| Lechia Gdańsk (loan) | 2011–12 | Ekstraklasa | 8 | 2 | — | | — | | — | | 8 | 2 |
| Legia Warsaw II | 2013–14 | III liga, gr. A | 1 | 0 | — | | — | | — | | 1 | 0 |
| Legia Warsaw II | 2014–15 | III liga, gr. A | 1 | 0 | — | | — | | — | | 1 | 0 |
| Legia Warsaw II | Total | | 2 | 0 | — | | — | | — | | 2 | 0 |
| Sandhausen (loan) | 2015–16 | 2. Bundesliga | 17 | 2 | 1 | 0 | — | | — | | 18 | 2 |
| Sandhausen | 2016–17 | 2. Bundesliga | 20 | 2 | 2 | 0 | — | | — | | 22 | 2 |
| Sandhausen | Total | | 37 | 4 | 3 | 0 | — | | — | | 40 | 4 |
| Śląsk Wrocław | 2017–18 | Ekstraklasa | 26 | 4 | 1 | 0 | — | | — | | 27 | 4 |
| Śląsk Wrocław | 2018–19 | Ekstraklasa | 1 | 1 | 0 | 0 | — | | — | | 1 | 1 |
| Śląsk Wrocław | Total | | 27 | 5 | 1 | 0 | — | | — | | 28 | 5 |
| Adana Demirspor | 2018–19 | TFF First League | 21 | 1 | 2 | 0 | — | | — | | 23 | 1 |
| Adana Demirspor | 2019–20 | TFF First League | 15 | 0 | 0 | 0 | — | | 1 (Note: Appearance in TFF First League play-offs) | 0 | 16 | 0 |
| Adana Demirspor | 2020–21 | TFF First League | 6 | 0 | 3 | 0 | — | | — | | 9 | 0 |
| Adana Demirspor | Total | | 42 | 1 | 5 | 0 | — | | 1 | 0 | 48 | 1 |
| Cracovia | 2020–21 | Ekstraklasa | 8 | 0 | 1 | 0 | — | | — | | 9 | 0 |
| Motor Lublin | 2021–22 | II liga | 9 | 0 | — | | — | | 2 (Note: Appearances in II liga promotion play-offs) | 0 | 11 | 0 |
| Weszło Warsaw | 2022–23 | V liga Masovia I | 21 | 16 | — | | — | | — | | 21 | 16 |
| Weszło Warsaw | 2023–24 | IV liga Masovia | 11 | 3 | — | | — | | — | | 11 | 3 |
| Weszło Warsaw | Total | | 32 | 19 | — | | — | | — | | 32 | 19 |
| KS Raszyn | 2024–25 | V liga Masovia II | 7 | 3 | — | | — | | — | | 7 | 3 |
| Kosa Konstancin | 2024–25 | Klasa A Warsaw III | 6 | 1 | — | | — | | — | | 6 | 1 |
| Kosa Konstancin | 2025–26 | Klasa A Warsaw III | 8 | 1 | — | | — | | — | | 8 | 1 |
| Kosa Konstancin | Total | | 14 | 2 | — | | — | | — | | 14 | 2 |
| Career totals | | | 281 | 59 | 22 | 5 | 27 | 5 | 6 | 0 | 336 | 69 |

=== International ===
Appearances and goals by national team and year
| National team | Year | Apps | Goals |
|---|---|---|---|
Poland
| Poland | 2012 | 1 | 0 |
| Poland | 2013 | 4 | 1 |
| Total | | 5 | 1 |

Scores and results list Poland's goal tally first, score column indicates score after each Kosecki goal.

List of international goals scored by Jakub Kosecki
| No. | Date | Venue | Opponent | Score | Result | Competition |
|---|---|---|---|---|---|---|
| 1 | 26 March 2013 | Stadion Narodowy, Warsaw, Poland | San Marino | 5–0 | 5–0 | 2014 FIFA World Cup qualification |

== Honours ==
ŁKS Łódź

- I liga: 2010–11

Legia Warsaw:

- Ekstraklasa: 2012–13, 2013–14
- Polish Cup: 2011–12, 2012–13, 2014–15

Weszło Warsaw

- V liga Masovia I: 2022–23
- Polish Cup (Warsaw regionals): 2022–23, 2023–24

Individual

- Młoda Ekstraklasa Player of the Season: 2009–10
- Ekstraklasa Player of the Month: November 2012
