= Mehmet Uslu =

Turkish footballer

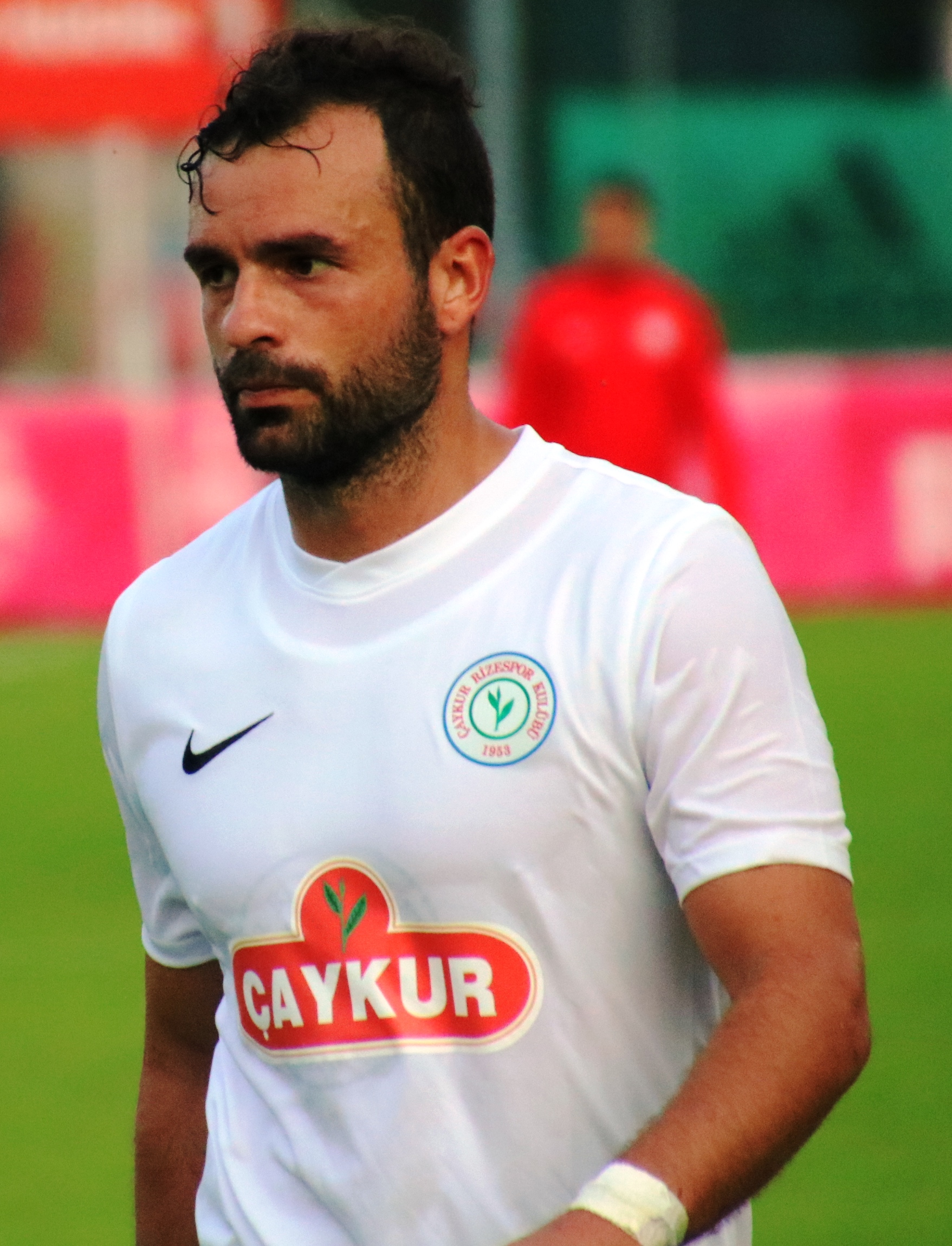

Personal information
- Date of birth: 25 February 1988 (age 38)
- Place of birth: Kocaeli, Turkey
- Height: 1.76 m (5 ft 9 in)
- Position: Left back

Team information
- Current team: Silivrispor
- Number: 5

Youth career
- Sapanca Genclikspor
- Sakaryaspor

Senior career*
Years	Team	Apps	(Gls)
2006–2008	Sakaryaspor	23	(1)
2008–2009	Hacettepe	2	(0)
2009	→ Kartalspor (loan)	13	(1)
2009–2013	Kartalspor	123	(14)
2013–2017	Konyaspor	82	(0)
2017–2019	Çaykur Rizespor	51	(2)
2019–2021	Adana Demirspor	30	(0)
2021	İstanbulspor	4	(0)
2021–2022	Eyüpspor	7	(0)
2022–2023	Sapanca Gençlikspor	26	(4)
2023–	Silivrispor	4	(0)

International career
2003–2004	Turkey U16	13	(0)
2004–2005	Turkey U17	4	(0)
2007	Turkey U19	2	(0)
- * Club domestic league appearances and goals as of 1 October 2023

Mehmet Uslu (born 25 February 1988) is a Turkish footballer who plays as a left back for Silivrispor.

== Honours ==
Konyaspor

- Turkish Cup: 2016–17
