= Marco Paixão =

Portuguese footballer (born 1984)

Personal information
- Full name: Marco Filipe Lopes Paixão
- Date of birth: 19 September 1984 (age 42)
- Place of birth: Sesimbra, Portugal
- Height: 1.85 m (6 ft 1 in)
- Position: Forward

Youth career
- 1994–1995: Alfarim
- 1995–2003: Sesimbra

Senior career*
Years	Team	Apps	(Gls)
2003–2005	Sesimbra		
2005–2006	Porto B	9	(0)
2006–2007	Guijuelo	37	(9)
2007–2008	Logroñés	38	(9)
2008–2009	Cultural Leonesa	33	(13)
2009–2011	Hamilton Academical	51	(6)
2012	Naft Tehran	16	(3)
2012–2013	Ethnikos Achna	31	(15)
2013–2015	Śląsk Wrocław	57	(27)
2015	Sparta Prague	3	(0)
2016–2018	Lechia Gdańsk	66	(34)
2018–2023	Altay	174	(104)
2024	Şanlıurfaspor	17	(10)
2024–2025	Bandırmaspor	41	(19)
2025–2026	Athens Kallithea	12	(1)
Total		585	(250)
- * Club domestic league appearances and goals

Marco Filipe Lopes Paixão (born 19 September 1984) is a Portuguese former professional footballer who played as a forward.

== Club career ==
=== Early career ===
Born in Sesimbra, Setúbal District, Paixão spent his early career in Portugal and Spain, playing with lowly teams in both countries – his hometown's G.D. Sesimbra, FC Porto B, CD Guijuelo, Logroñés CF and Cultural y Deportiva Leonesa.

In 2007–08, he suffered relegation from Segunda División B with Logroñés, and in the following season scored 13 goals for Leonesa.

=== Hamilton Academical ===
Paixão's first taste of professional football came in 2009 as he signed for Scottish Premier League club Hamilton Academical on 6 August, alongside twin brother Flávio. He made his league debut late in the month, against Aberdeen.

On 11 April 2011, it was announced that Paixão would leave at the end of the campaign. However, just three days later, he was released from his contract with immediate effect, alongside his sibling. He appeared in 56 official matches for the Accies, scoring six goals.

=== Naft Tehran ===
On 5 January 2012, Paixão joined his brother in Iran after signing with Naft Tehran F.C. until the end of the season. He made his debut in a 3–1 home loss against Foolad F.C. five days later, scoring his first goal in a 1–0 win over Malavan F.C. on 8 February.

=== Ethnikos and Poland ===
In the summer of 2012, Paixão joined Cypriot side Ethnikos Achna FC. He netted his first goal for his new club on 3 November, in a 1–1 draw at AEL Limassol.

In June 2013, Paixão signed a two-year contract with Śląsk Wrocław in Poland. He scored a career-best 21 goals in 2013–14, but his team could only qualify for the relegation play-offs.

In June 2015, Paixão put pen to paper to a two-year deal at AC Sparta Prague. The following January, after being barely used by the Czech club, he returned to the Ekstraklasa with Lechia Gdańsk after agreeing to a two-and-a-half-year contract; his twin joined him a month later.

Paixão concluded the 2016–17 season with hat-tricks in 4–0 home wins over Jagiellonia Białystok and Pogoń Szczecin. This brought his final tally to 18, joint with Lech Poznań's Marcin Robak as the top scorer.

=== Turkey and Greece ===
In March 2018, Paixão was removed from the first team when manager Piotr Stokowiec accused him of feigning an injury, and when his contract expired in June, he moved to Altay S.K. in the TFF First League. He was top scorer in his first season with the İzmir-based team, netting 29 times in 33 games.

Paixão signed for Şanlıurfaspor also of the Turkish second tier in December 2023, with effect from January 2024. On 2 September 2025, the 40-year-old joined Athens Kallithea F.C. of Super League Greece 2.

== International career ==
During their spell in Poland, both Paixão and his sibling were repeatedly poised to be called up to the Portugal national team, but nothing came of it.

== Personal life ==
Paixão's twin brother Flávio was also a footballer, Marco being the older by five minutes.

== Career statistics ==
As of 16 April 2020

Appearances and goals by club, season and competition
Club	Season	League			National cup (Note: Includes Scottish Cup, Cypriot Cup, Polish Cup, Czech Cup, Turkish Cup)		League cup (Note: Includes Scottish League Cup)		Other		Total	
Club	Season	Division	Apps	Goals	Apps	Goals	Apps	Goals	Apps	Goals	Apps	Goals
Hamilton Academical	2009–10	Scottish Premier League	33	5	2	1	1	0	—		36	6
Hamilton Academical	2010–11	Scottish Premier League	18	1	2	0	1	0	—		21	1
Hamilton Academical	Total		51	6	4	1	2	0	0	0	57	7
Naft Tehran	2011–12	Persian Gulf Cup	16	3	0	0	—		—		16	3
Ethnikos Achna	2012–13	Cypriot First Division	31	15	2	0	—		—		33	15
Śląsk Wrocław	2013–14	Ekstraklasa	37	21	2	0	—		5 (Note: Appearances in UEFA Europa League)	5	44	26
Śląsk Wrocław	2014–15	Ekstraklasa	20	6	2	1	—		—		22	7
Śląsk Wrocław	Total		57	27	4	1	0	0	5	5	66	33
Sparta Prague	2015–16	Czech First League	3	0	1	0	—		2 (Note: One appearance in UEFA Champions League, one appearance in UEFA Europa League)	0	6	0
Lechia Gdańsk	2015–16	Ekstraklasa	3	0	0	0	—		—		3	0
Lechia Gdańsk	2016–17	Ekstraklasa	35	18	2	0	—		—		37	18
Lechia Gdańsk	2017–18	Ekstraklasa	27	16	0	0	—		—		27	16
Lechia Gdańsk	Total		65	34	2	0	0	0	0	0	67	34
Altay	2018–19	TFF First League	33	29	2	1	—		—		35	30
Altay	2019–20	TFF First League	27	17	1	0	—		—		28	17
Altay	Total		60	46	3	1	0	0	0	0	63	47
Career total			233	113	13	3	2	0	7	5	253	121

== Honours ==
Individual

- Ekstraklasa top scorer: 2016–17 (18 goals, joint with Marcin Robak)
- TFF First League top scorer: 2018–19 (29 goals), 2019–20 (22 goals) 2020–21 (22 goals) 2022–23 (21 goals)
