= Hasan Kılıç =

Dutch-Turkish footballer

Personal information
- Date of birth: 27 July 1992 (age 34)
- Place of birth: Utrecht, Netherlands
- Height: 1.84 m (6 ft 0 in)
- Position: Midfielder

Team information
- Current team: Aliağa FK
- Number: 6

Youth career
- DWSC
- Elinkwijk
- Den Bosch

Senior career*
Years	Team	Apps	(Gls)
2010–2014	Den Bosch	61	(5)
2014–2017	Samsunspor	98	(4)
2017–2019	Osmanlıspor	47	(3)
2018	→ Denizlispor (loan)	14	(2)
2020–2021	Adana Demirspor	50	(16)
2021–2022	Samsunspor	31	(7)
2022–2023	Pendikspor	30	(3)
2023–2024	Sakaryaspor	23	(3)
2024–2025	Pendikspor	28	(3)
2025–	Aliağa FK	13	(1)
- * Club domestic league appearances and goals as of 29 November 2025

Hasan Kılıç (born 27 July 1992) is a Dutch-Turkish professional footballer who plays as a midfielder for TFF 2. Lig club Aliağa FK.
