= Samed Kaya =

Turkish association football player

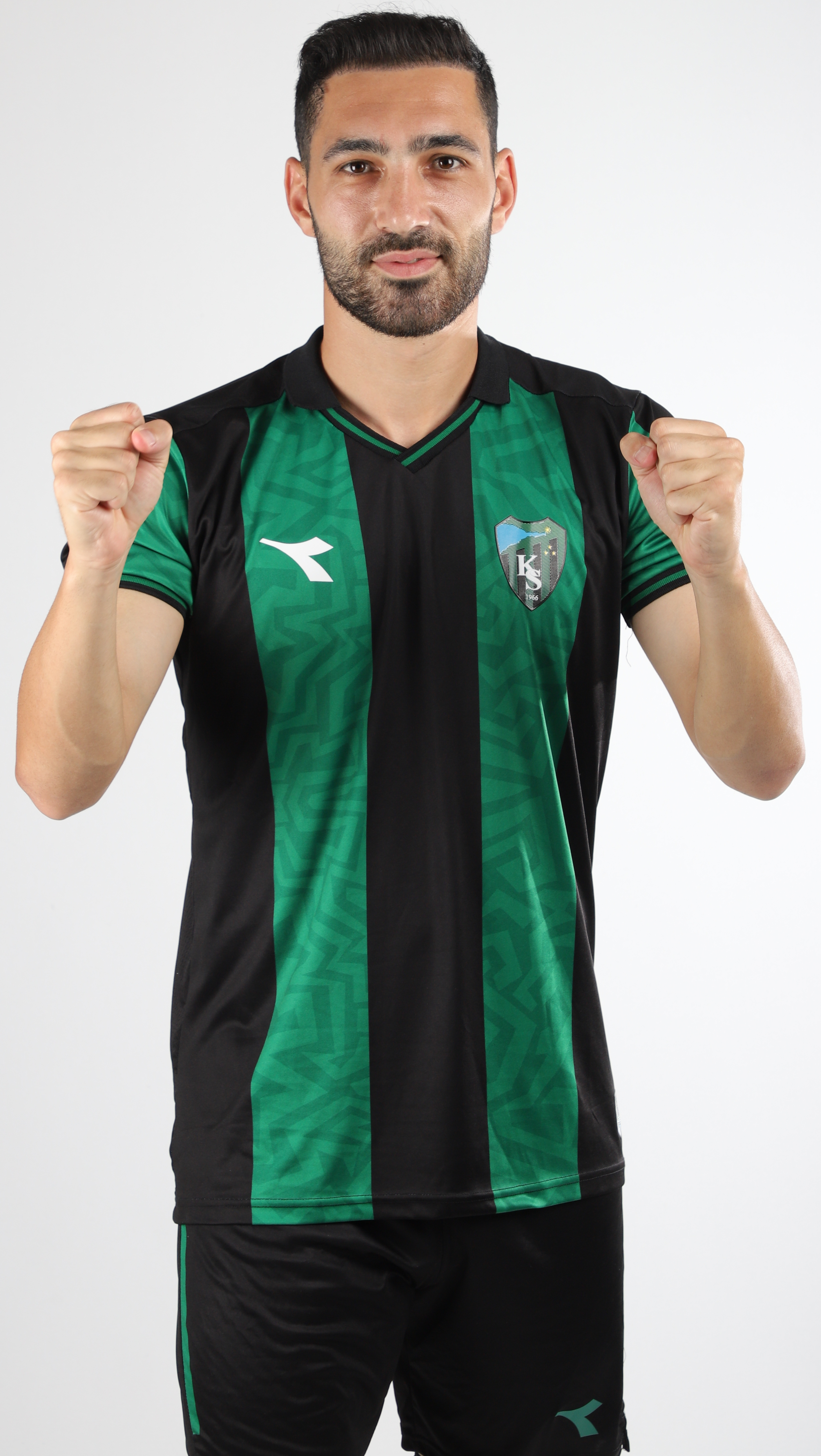

Personal information
- Full name: Samed Ali Kaya
- Date of birth: 10 September 1995 (age 31)
- Place of birth: Tomarza, Turkey
- Height: 1.80 m (5 ft 11 in)
- Position: Forward

Team information
- Current team: Elazığspor
- Number: 77

Youth career
- 2007–2008: Çukurova Belediyespor
- 2008–2011: Adana Gençlerbirliği
- 2011–2014: Kayserispor

Senior career*
Years	Team	Apps	(Gls)
2014–2016	Kayserispor	0	(0)
2014	→ Tarsus İdman Yurdu (loan)	13	(2)
2014–2015	→ Haçka Spor (loan)	12	(1)
2015–2016	→ Kayseri Erciyesspor (loan)	1	(0)
2016–2017	Erzin Belediyespor	34	(16)
2017–2018	Menemen Belediyespor	35	(25)
2018–2020	Göztepe	3	(0)
2019	→ BB Erzurumspor (loan)	3	(0)
2019	→ Adana Demirspor (loan)	11	(4)
2020	→ Menemenspor (loan)	12	(6)
2020–2021	Adana Demirspor	12	(4)
2021	Ankaraspor	11	(3)
2021–2022	Adanaspor	14	(4)
2022–2023	Kocaelispor	42	(15)
2023–2024	Menemen	11	(1)
2024	Kastamonuspor 1966	15	(5)
2024–2025	Adana 01 FK	16	(8)
2025	Vanspor	12	(3)
2025–	Elazığspor	12	(2)
- * Club domestic league appearances and goals as of 30 November 2025

Samed Ali Kaya (born 10 September 1995) is a Turkish professional footballer who plays as a forward for TFF 2. Lig club Elazığspor.

== Professional career ==
On 18 July 2018, Kaya signed with Göztepe after a season as the top scorer in the TFF Second League Kaya made his professional debut with Göztepe in a 2-1 Süper Lig loss to Büyükşehir Belediye Erzurumspor on 10 November 2018.
