= Sinan Kurt (footballer, born 1995) =

German footballer

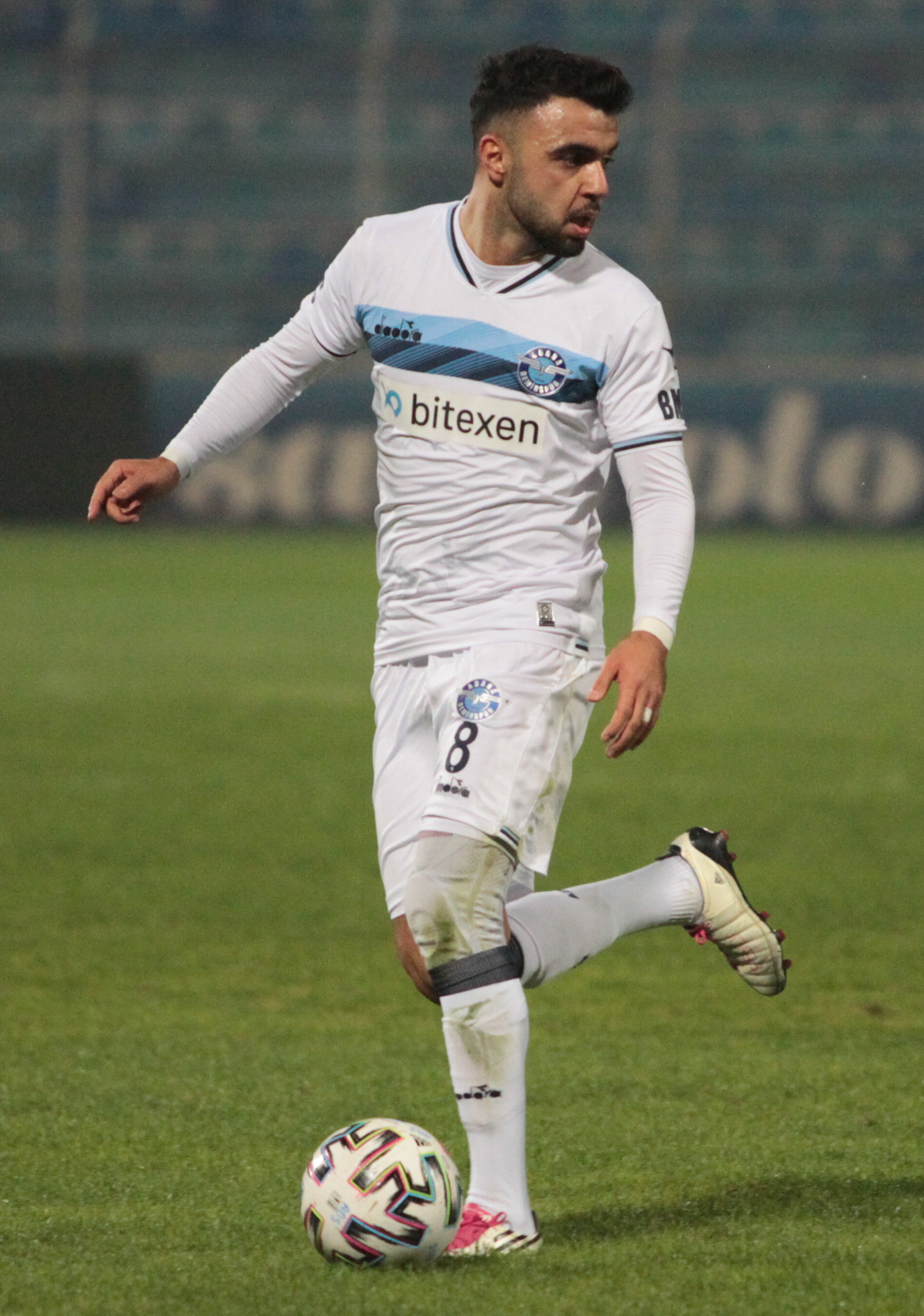
- Kurt in 2020

Personal information
- Date of birth: 2 March 1995 (age 31)
- Place of birth: Moers, Germany
- Height: 1.78 m (5 ft 10 in)
- Position: Midfielder

Team information
- Current team: Kayserispor
- Number: 8

Youth career
- 2008–2013: VfB Hüls

Senior career*
Years	Team	Apps	(Gls)
2013–2014	VfB Hüls	34	(8)
2014–2015	VfL Bochum II	23	(9)
2015–2016	Rot-Weiß Oberhausen	33	(6)
2016–2019	Osmanlıspor	35	(8)
2017–2018	→ Bugsaşspor (loan)	27	(6)
2019–2022	Adana Demirspor	82	(9)
2022–2024	Eyüpspor	36	(2)
2023–2024	→ Sakaryaspor (loan)	26	(1)
2024–2026	Amedspor	62	(1)
2026–	Kayserispor	0	(0)
- * Club domestic league appearances and goals as of 17 August 2026

Sinan Kurt (born 2 March 1995) is a German professional footballer who plays as a midfielder for Turkish club Kayserispor.

== Career ==
Kurt began his playing career in the Regionalliga, with VfL Bochum II and Rot-Weiß Oberhausen. He made his professional debut for Osmanlıspor in the Süper Lig in a 4–0 loss to Beşiktaş on 3 June 2017.
