= Emircan Altıntaş =

Turkish footballer

Personal information
- Full name: Emircan Altıntaş
- Date of birth: 15 June 1995 (age 31)
- Place of birth: Maçka, Turkey
- Height: 1.83 m (6 ft 0 in)
- Position: Winger

Team information
- Current team: Şanlıurfaspor
- Number: 11

Youth career
- 2006–2009: Beşiktaş
- 2009–2010: Dikilitaş
- 2010–2011: Beşiktaş
- 2011–2014: İstanbul Başakşehir

Senior career*
Years	Team	Apps	(Gls)
2014	İstanbul Başakşehir	0	(0)
2014	→ Kırıkhanspor (loan)	2	(0)
2014–2020	Ümraniyespor	91	(31)
2015–2016	→ Sultanbeylispor (loan)	27	(7)
2020–2023	Alanyaspor	8	(0)
2020–2021	→ Adana Demirspor (loan)	21	(5)
2021–2022	→ BB Erzurumspor (loan)	33	(3)
2022–2023	→ Çaykur Rizespor (loan)	20	(5)
2023–2024	Iğdır	9	(0)
2024	→ Çorum (loan)	0	(0)
2024–2025	Sakaryaspor	14	(1)
2025–	Şanlıurfaspor	7	(0)
- * Club domestic league appearances and goals as of 30 November 2025

Emircan Altıntaş (born 15 July 1995) is a Turkish professional footballer who plays as a winger for Turkish TFF 2. Lig club Şanlıurfaspor.

== Professional career ==
On 13 January 2020, Altıntaş with Alanyaspor after years at Ümraniyespor. Altıntaş made his professional debut with Alanyaspor in a 1-0 Süper Lig loss to Gençlerbirliği S.K. on 16 February 2020.
