= Süleyman Olgun =

Turkish footballer

Personal information
- Date of birth: 20 April 1987 (age 39)
- Place of birth: Antalya, Turkey
- Height: 1.86 m (6 ft 1 in)
- Position: Right back

Team information
- Current team: Muş 1984 Muşspor
- Number: 5

Youth career
- 1998–2005: Antalya Özel İdarespor
- 2005–2006: Denizlispor

Senior career*
Years	Team	Apps	(Gls)
2006–2011	Denizlispor	11	(1)
2007–2008	→ Denizli BSK (loan)	30	(5)
2010–2011	→ Denizli BSK (loan)	22	(7)
2011–2013	Denizli BSK	34	(2)
2013–2015	Sancaktepe	56	(10)
2015–2016	Kızılcabölükspor	30	(6)
2016–2018	Sancaktepe	63	(6)
2018–2021	Ankara Keçiörengücü	85	(6)
2021–2022	Afjet Afyonspor	10	(0)
2022	Ankara Keçiörengücü	0	(0)
2022	→ Çankaya (loan)	9	(0)
2022–	Muş 1984 Muşspor	7	(0)
- * Club domestic league appearances and goals as of 15 October 2022

Süleyman Olgun (born 20 April 1987) is a Turkish professional footballer who plays as a right back for Muş 1984 Muşspor.
