= Erkan Zengin =

Swedish footballer (born 1985)

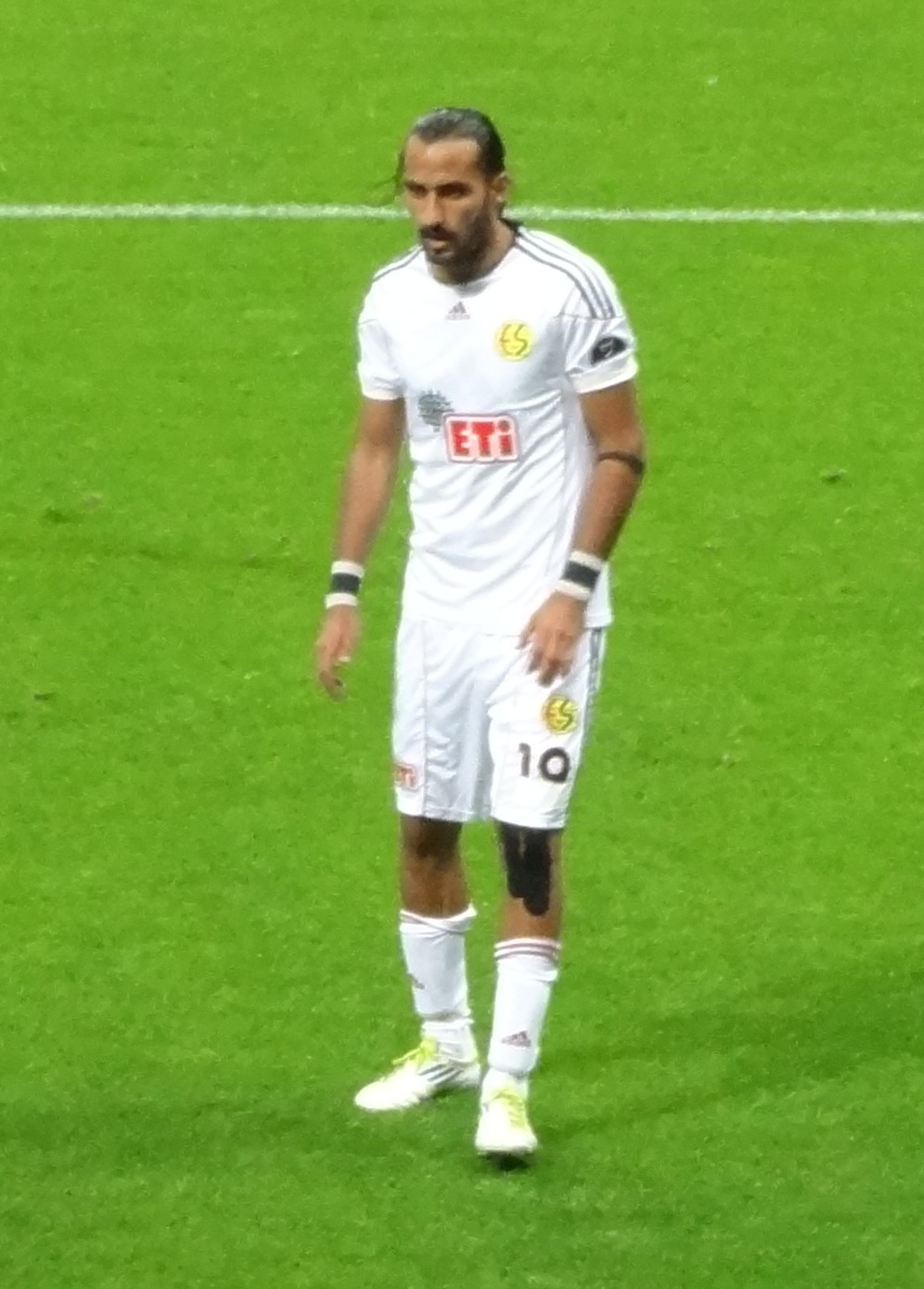
- Zengin playing for Eskişehirspor in 2011

Personal information
- Date of birth: 5 August 1985 (age 41)
- Place of birth: Kulu, Turkey
- Height: 1.82 m (6 ft 0 in)
- Position: Winger

Team information
- Current team: IFK Haninge
- Number: 10

Senior career*
| Years | Team | Apps | (Gls) |
| 2003–2004 | Hammarby TFF | 23 | (10) |
| 2004–2008 | Hammarby IF | 92 | (8) |
| 2009 | → Beşiktaş (loan) | 2 | (0) |
| 2009–2010 | Beşiktaş | 0 | (0) |
| 2010 | → Eskişehirspor (loan) | 12 | (2) |
| 2010–2015 | Eskişehirspor | 145 | (18) |
| 2015–2016 | Trabzonspor | 40 | (3) |
| 2016–2018 | Eskişehirspor | 44 | (15) |
| 2018 | Hammarby IF | 3 | (0) |
| 2018–2019 | Fatih Karagümrük | 43 | (21) |
| 2020–2021 | Adana Demirspor | 27 | (12) |
| 2021 | Tuzlaspor | 3 | (0) |
| 2022–2023 | Segeltorps IF | 26 | (11) |
| 2024–2025 | IFK Haninge | 35 | (11) |

International career
| 1999–2000 | Turkey U16 | 6 | (0) |
| 2002 | Turkey U19 | 2 | (0) |
| 2005–2006 | Sweden U21 | 13 | (2) |
| 2013–2016 | Sweden | 21 | (3) |

Managerial career
- 2019: Fatih Karagümrük
- * Club domestic league appearances and goals as of 24 November 2025

Erkan Zengin (born 5 August 1985) is a professional footballer who plays as a winger. Born in Turkey, he played for the Sweden national team.

A full international between 2013 and 2016, he won 21 caps and scored three goals for the Sweden national team, and represented his country at UEFA Euro 2016.

== Early life ==
Zengin was born in Kulu, Turkey – but moved to Stockholm, Sweden, together with his Turkish parents when he was a few weeks old. He grew up in Botkyrka and started to play football at age six with the local club Norsborgs IF. In 1994, at age 9, he moved to Hammarby IF.

== Club career ==
In January 2009, Zengin signed a half-year loan contract with Beşiktaş. Beşiktaş had the option to buy him in summer for a fee of €400,000.

On 28 July 2016, Zengin joined Eskişehirspor again.

== International career ==
Zengin played for his birth country Turkey in youth competitions, before choosing to represent the Sweden national team in senior competition, the country in which he grew up.

He made his senior international debut for Sweden on 26 March 2013, playing from start in an away match against Slovakia. He was a squad player for Sweden at Euro 2016, where he came on as a substitute in the last group game against Belgium.

Zengin announced his retirement from international duty following the tournament, having represented Sweden 21 times, scoring 3 goals.

== Career statistics ==
=== International ===
Appearances and goals by national team and year
| National team | Year | Apps | Goals |
|---|---|---|---|
| Sweden | 2013 | 3 | 0 |
| Sweden | 2014 | 8 | 2 |
| Sweden | 2015 | 7 | 1 |
| Sweden | 2016 | 3 | 0 |
| Total | | 21 | 3 |

Scores and results list Sweden's goal tally first, score column indicates score after each Zengin goal.

List of international goals scored by Erkan Zengin
| No. | Date | Venue | Opponent | Score | Result | Competition | Ref. |
|---|---|---|---|---|---|---|---|
| 1 | 8 September 2014 | Ernst-Happel-Stadion, Vienna, Austria | Austria | 1–1 | 1–1 | UEFA Euro 2016 qualifying | |
| 2 | 12 October 2014 | Friends Arena, Solna, Sweden | Liechtenstein | 1–0 | 2–0 | UEFA Euro 2016 qualifying | |
| 3 | 12 October 2015 | Friends Arena, Solna, Sweden | Moldova | 2–0 | 2–0 | UEFA Euro 2016 qualifying | |

== Honours ==
Beşiktaş

- Süper Lig: 2008–09
- Turkish Cup: 2008–09

Segeltorps IF

- Division 3 Södra Svealand: 2023

IFK Haninge

- Division 2 Södra Svealand: 2024

Individual

- Division 2 Player of the Year: 2024
