= Mertan Caner Öztürk =

Turkish footballer

Mertan Öztürk
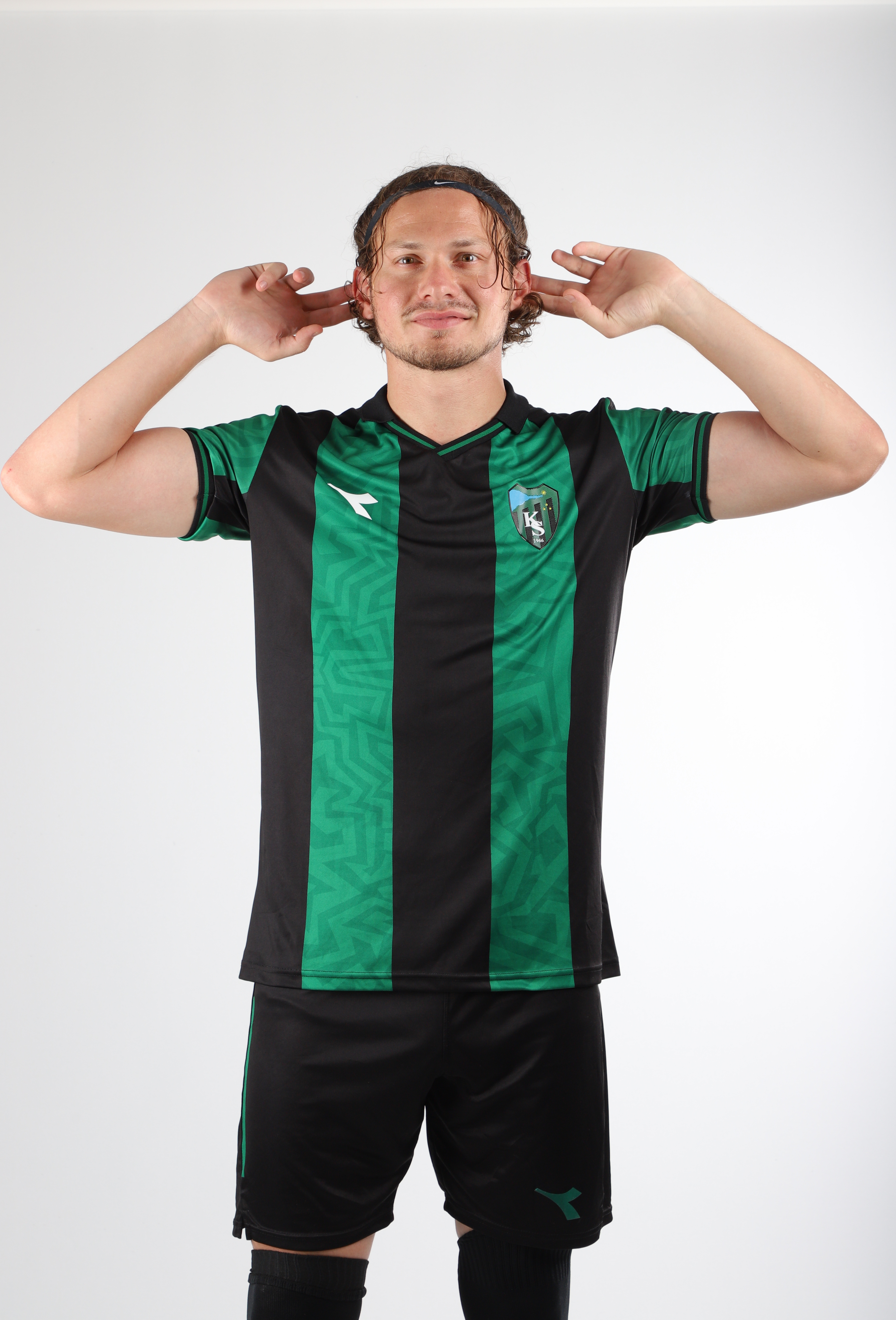

Personal information
- Full name: Mertan Caner Öztürk
- Date of birth: 2 November 1992 (age 34)
- Place of birth: Fatih, Istanbul, Turkey
- Height: 1.80 m (5 ft 11 in)
- Positions: Winger; forward

Team information
- Current team: Kastamonuspor 1966
- Number: 48

Youth career
- 2005–2011: Galatasaray A2

Senior career*
Years	Team	Apps	(Gls)
2011–2013	Galatasaray	0	(0)
2013–2015	Altınordu	34	(5)
2015	→ Aydınspor 1923 (loan)	14	(5)
2015–2017	Manisaspor	50	(5)
2017–2018	Elazığspor	30	(6)
2018–2020	Osmanlıspor	60	(16)
2020–2021	Boluspor	11	(1)
2021–2022	İstanbulspor	11	(0)
2022–2023	Kocaelispor	28	(0)
2023–2024	Etimesgut Belediyespor	14	(2)
2024	İskenderunspor	16	(4)
2024–2025	Sarıyer	13	(2)
2025–	Kastamonuspor 1966	12	(4)

International career
2010	Turkey U18	4	(0)
- * Club domestic league appearances and goals as of 30 November 2025

Mertan Caner Öztürk (born 2 November 1992) is a Turkish footballer who plays as a winger for TFF 2. Lig club Kastamonuspor 1966.

He is currently studying German language and literature at Istanbul University.

== Club career ==
=== Galatasaray ===
He played his first match for the club on 12 November 2011 in a friendly against S.L. Benfica. He signed a 5-year professional contract with Galatasaray on 18 November 2011, after impressing Fatih Terim in the game the week before. He is known with his talented vision, and uses his pace and technique to his advantage.

He played his first official match for the club on 10 January 2012 in a cup match against Adana Demirspor. He made an assist to Sercan Yıldırım, which turned the match to 3–0.

On 6 July 2012, Mertan Caner Öztürk was brought to the A squad by Fatih Terim and was training in the camp in Austria alongside Semih Kaya, Tomáš Ujfaluši, Milan Baroš, Fernando Muslera, and the rest of the Galatasaray squad so they could prepare for the Süper Lig, Turkish Cup and the UEFA Champions League.
