= Francis Ezeh =

German footballer

Personal information
- Full name: Okwuchukwu Francis Ezeh
- Date of birth: 12 September 1997 (age 29)
- Place of birth: Ogboko, Nigeria
- Height: 1.82 m (6 ft 0 in)
- Position: Forward

Team information
- Current team: Ankara Keçiörengücü
- Number: 21

Senior career*
Years	Team	Apps	(Gls)
2019–2021	Balıkesirspor	27	(4)
2021–2022	Adana Demirspor	21	(2)
2022	→ Tuzlaspor (loan)	13	(8)
2022–2024	Eyüpspor	16	(1)
2024	Železničar Pančevo	20	(5)
2025–	Ankara Keçiörengücü	53	(17)
- * Club domestic league appearances and goals as of 5 May 2026

Okwuchukwu Francis Ezeh (born 12 September 1997) is a Nigerian professional footballer who plays as a forward for the Turkish club Ankara Keçiörengücü.

== Professional career ==
Ezeh began his senior career with Balıkesirspor in the TFF First League. After a season and a half with them, he transferred to Adana Demirspor on 10 January 2021. He made his professional debut with Adana Demirspor in a 1–0 Süper Lig loss to Fenerbahçe on 15 August 2021.

== Honours ==
Individual

- Serbian SuperLiga Player of the Week: 2024–25 (Round 19),
