= 2023–24 Çaykur Rizespor season =

Çaykur Rizespor
2023–24 season
- Chairman: İbrahim Turgut
- Manager: İlhan Palut
- Stadium: City of Rize Stadium
- Süper Lig: 9th
- Turkish Cup: Fifth round
- Top goalscorer: League: Dal Varešanović (9); All: Adolfo Gaich (11)
- Average home league attendance: 5,103

The 2023–24 season was Çaykur Rizespor's 71st season in existence and first one back in the Süper Lig. They also competed in the Turkish Cup.

== Players ==
=== First-team squad ===
Note: Flags indicate national team as defined under FIFA eligibility rules; some limited exceptions apply. Players may hold more than one non-FIFA nationality.

No.	Pos.	Nation	Player
1	GK	TUR	Tarık Çetin
2	DF	UZB	Husniddin Aliqulov
3	DF	TUR	Halil İbrahim Pehlivan
7	FW	TUR	Benhur Keser
8	MF	BIH	Dal Varešanović
10	FW	NGA	Ibrahim Olawoyin
12	FW	CMR	John Mary
13	MF	TUR	Eren Emre Aydın
14	MF	NGA	Azubuike Okechukwu
16	DF	TUR	Seyfettin Anıl Yaşar
19	FW	SEN	Oumar Diouf
21	FW	ESP	Óscar Pinchi
23	GK	TUR	Gökhan Akkan (captain)
27	DF	TUR	Eray Korkmaz
30	GK	TUR	Zafer Görgen
33	DF	TUR	Sinan Osmanoğlu
35	DF	TUR	Alberk Koç
37	DF	TUR	Muhammet Taha Şahin

No.	Pos.	Nation	Player
53	DF	TUR	Emirhan Topçu
54	MF	TUR	Mithat Pala
66	FW	TUR	Güvenç Usta
77	FW	KOS	Altin Zeqiri
—	DF	TUR	Aziz Aksoy
—	DF	TUR	Mustafa Şengül
—	DF	TUR	Selim Ay
—	MF	BIH	Srđan Grahovac
—	MF	RSA	Lebogang Phiri
—	MF	ALB	Enriko Papa
—	MF	UGA	Farouk Miya
—	MF	TUR	Efe Tecimer
—	FW	TUR	Uğur Can Semizoğlu
—	FW	SEN	Mame Mor Faye
—	FW	CUW	Anthony van den Hurk

== Transfers ==
=== In ===
Pos.	Player	Transferred from	Fee	Date	Source
DF	(Uzbekistan) Husniddin Aliqulov	(Uzbekistan) Nasaf	€400,000	5 August 2023	
FW	(Kosovo) Altin Zeqiri	(Finland) Lahti	Undisclosed	10 August 2023	
FW	(Spain) Pinchi	(Spain) Las Palmas	Undisclosed	10 August 2023	
MF	(Bosnia and Herzegovina) Dal Varešanović	(Bosnia and Herzegovina) Sarajevo	Undisclosed	10 August 2023	
MF	(Brazil) Gustavo Sauer	(Brazil) Botafogo	Free	18 August 2023	
MF	(England) Jonjo Shelvey	(England) Nottingham Forest	Loan	14 September 2023	
FW	(Argentina) Adolfo Gaich	(Russia) CSKA Moscow	Loan	14 September 2023	

=== Out ===
Pos.	Player	Transferred to	Fee	Date	Source
DF	(Turkey) Oğuz Ceylan	(Turkey) Kocaelispor	Undisclosed	11 August 2023	
MF	(Turkey) Sefa Yılmaz	(Turkey) Bucaspor 1928	Free	11 August 2023	
MF	(Turkey) Koray Altınay	(Turkey) Bucaspor 1928	Undisclosed	11 August 2023	

== Pre-season and friendlies ==
Win Draw Loss Fixtures

24 July 2023 Friendly	Antalyaspor (Turkey)	0–0	(Turkey) Çaykur Rizespor	Erzurum
16:30 UTC+3				Stadium: Yüksek İrtifa Kamp Merkezi

28 July 2023 Friendly	Çaykur Rizespor (Turkey)	0–0	(Turkey) Ümraniyespor	Erzurum
16:15 UTC+3				Stadium: Yüksek İrtifa Kamp Merkezi

== Competitions ==
=== Overall record ===
Competition	First match	Last match	Starting round	Final position	Record							
Competition	First match	Last match	Starting round	Final position	Pld	W	D	L	GF	GA	GD	Win %
Süper Lig	13 August 2023	19 May 2024	Matchday 1		21	9	5	7	26	29	−3	42.86
Turkish Cup	7 December 2023	16 January 2023	Fourth round	Fifth round	2	1	0	1	5	3	+2	50.00
Total					23	10	5	8	31	32	−1	43.48

Last updated: 19 August 2023
Source: Soccerway

=== Süper Lig ===
==== League table ====
Pos	Team	Pld	W	D	L	GF	GA	GD	Pts
7	Sivasspor	38	14	12	12	47	54	−7	54
8	Alanyaspor	38	12	16	10	53	50	+3	52
9	Rizespor	38	14	8	16	48	58	−10	50
10	Antalyaspor	38	12	13	13	44	49	−5	49
11	Gaziantep	38	12	8	18	50	57	−7	44 (Note: Gaziantep are ahead of Adana Demirspor on head-to-head points: Gaziantep 2–2 Adana Demirspor, Adana Demirspor 1–6 Gaziantep.)

Source: Süper Lig
Rules for classification: 1) Points; 2) Head-to-head points; 3) Head-to-head goal difference; 4) Head-to-head goals scored; 5) Goal difference; 6) Goals scored; 7) Play-off.

==== Results summary ====
Overall								Home						Away					
Pld	W	D	L	GF	GA	GD	Pts	W	D	L	GF	GA	GD	W	D	L	GF	GA	GD
21	9	5	7	26	29	−3	32	7	2	2	15	9	+6	2	3	5	11	20	−9

Last updated: 20 January 2024.
Source: Trendyol Süper Lig

==== Results by round ====
Round	1	2	3	4	5	6	7	8	9	10	11	12	13	14	15	16	17	18	19	20	21	22	23
Ground	A	H	A	H	A	H	A	H	A	H	A	H	A	H	A	H	H	A	H	H	A	H	A
Result	L	D	W	W	W	D	L	W	L	L	L	W	D	W	D	L	W	D	W	W	L		
Position	15	16	11	6	4	4	8	6	8	9	11	10	9	8	8	8	8	8	7	5	5		

Updated to match(es) played on 20 January 2024. Source: Trendyol Süper Lig
A = Away; H = Home; W = Win; D = Draw; L = Loss

==== Matches ====
13 August 2023 1	Adana Demirspor	2–1	Çaykur Rizespor	Adana
21:45 UTC+3	Belhanda 27', (yellow card) 43'; Akbaba (yellow card) 30'; Niang (yellow card) 80'; Erdoğan 90+1'; Rodrigues (yellow card) 90+5'; Svensson (yellow card) 90+15'; Güler (yellow card) 90+16'	Report	Zeqiri (yellow card) 4'; Pinchi (yellow card) 58'; Pala (yellow card) 78'; Koç (yellow card) 81'; Mary 87'; Şahin (yellow card) 90+1'; Topçu (yellow card) 90+16'	Stadium: New Adana Stadium; Referee: Ümit Öztürk

19 August 2023 2	Çaykur Rizespor	0–0	Alanyaspor	Rize
19:15 UTC+3	Olawoyin (yellow card) 69'; Korkmaz (yellow card) 74'; Yaşar (yellow card) 87'	Report	Özdemir (yellow card) 40'; Richard (yellow card) 45+2'; Augusto (yellow card) 64'; Aydın (red card) 67'	Stadium: City of Rize Stadium; Referee: Yiğit Arslan

26 August 2023 3	Trabzonspor	2–3	Çaykur Rizespor	Trabzon
19:15 UTC+3		Report		Stadium: Şenol Güneş Sports Complex

1 September 2023 4	Çaykur Rizespor	1–0	Fatih Karagümrük	Rize
22:00 EEST	Varešanović 45+1'; Pehlivan (yellow card) 66'; Topçu (yellow card) 74'; Akkan (yellow card) 77'	Report	Drešević (yellow card) 33'; Shukurov (yellow card) 90+7'	Stadium: City of Rize Stadium; Attendance: 5,084; Referee: (Turkey) Murat Erdogan

16 September 2023 5	Konyaspor	1–2	Çaykur Rizespor	Konya
18:00 EEST	Yazğılı 34'; Moreno (yellow card) 49'; Karayel (yellow card) 90+4'	Report	Şahin (yellow card) 33'; Gustavo Sauer 89' (pen.); Gaich 90+2'	Stadium: Konya Metropolitan Municipality Stadium; Attendance: 5,649; Referee: (Turkey) Bahattin Şimşek

23 September 2023 6	Çaykur Rizespor	1–1	Sivasspor	Rize
18:00 EEST	Varešanović (yellow card) 13' (goal) 35'; Mocsi (yellow card) 44'; Pala (yellow card) 61'; Şahin (yellow card) 64'; Topçu (yellow card) 75'; Keser (yellow card) 88'	Report	Samuel Sáiz 7'; Manaj (yellow card) 66'; Charisis (yellow card) 86'; Osmanpaşa (yellow card) 90+2'	Stadium: City of Rize Stadium; Attendance: 5,932; Referee: (Turkey) Burak Pakkan

1 October 2023 7	Fenerbahçe	5–0	Çaykur Rizespor	Istanbul
17:00 EEST	Szymański 3'; Kahveci 47'; Džeko 62'; Tadić 75'; King 90+3' (yellow card) 90+3'	Report	Şahin (yellow card) 45+3'; Shelvey (yellow card) 80'; Gaich (yellow card) 90+2'	Stadium: Şükrü Saracoğlu Stadium; Attendance: 40,481; Referee: (Turkey) Cihan Aydın

8 October 2023 8	Çaykur Rizespor	1–0	Samsunspor	Rize
14:30 EEST	Pala (red card) 13'; Görgen (yellow card) 74'; Keser 80' (yellow card) 81'; Varešanović (yellow card) 90'	Report	Tırpan (yellow card) 33'; Dimata (yellow card) 45+3'; Kılınç (yellow card) 78'	Stadium: City of Rize Stadium; Attendance: 5,917; Referee: (Turkey) Abdulkadir Bitigen

21 October 2023 9	Kayserispor	3–1	Çaykur Rizespor	Kayseri
14:30 EEST	Thiam 31' 66' (pen.) 89' (pen.) (yellow card) 90+1'; Aylton Boa Morte (yellow card) 40'; Carole (yellow card) 57'; Yılmaz (yellow card) 68'; Jeanvier (yellow card) 90+4'	Report	Varešanović (yellow card) 56'; Zeqiri 70'; Minchev (yellow card) 87'	Stadium: RHG Enertürk Enerji Stadium; Attendance: 4,049; Referee: (Turkey) Burak Şeker

28 October 2023 10	Çaykur Rizespor	0–1	Galatasaray	Rize
20:00 EEST	Zeqiri (yellow card) 62'; Gustavo Sauer (yellow card) 87'; Şahin (yellow card) 90+7'	Report	Güvenç (yellow card) 25'; Sérgio Oliveira 68'; Sánchez (yellow card) 89'; Ziyech (yellow card) 90+5'	Stadium: City of Rize Stadium; Attendance: 11,092; Referee: (Turkey) Kadir Sağlam

6 November 2023 11	Gaziantep	2–0	Çaykur Rizespor	Gaziantep
20:00 EEST	Maxim 20' (pen.); Djilobodji (yellow card) 41'; Drăguș (yellow card) 46' (goal) 50'; Niță (yellow card) 75'	Report	Højer (yellow card) 76'	Stadium: Kalyon Stadyumu; Attendance: 6,570; Referee: (Turkey) Ali Şansalan

12 November 2023 12	Çaykur Rizespor	1–0	İstanbulspor	Rize
16:00 EEST	Shelvey 5' (yellow card) 62'	Report		Stadium: City of Rize Stadium; Attendance: 3,882; Referee: (Turkey) Sarper Saka

26 November 2023 13	Antalyaspor	0–0	Çaykur Rizespor	Antalya
16:00 EEST	Kałuziński (yellow card) 75'	Report	Olawoyin (yellow card) 24'; Shelvey (yellow card) 30'; Mocsi (yellow card) 76'; Topçu (yellow card) 85'; Pala (yellow card) 86'	Stadium: Corendon Airlines Park; Attendance: 6,882; Referee: (Turkey) Turgut Doman

2 December 2023 14	Çaykur Rizespor	3–2	İstanbul Başakşehir	Rize
16:00 EEST	Olawoyin 12' 90+2' (yellow card) 90+7'; Varešanović 17'; Mocsi (yellow card) 90+4'	Report	Piątek 6' (yellow card) 90+8'; Opoku 45+2'; Abeid (yellow card) 82'; Dubois (yellow card) 90+5'	Stadium: City of Rize Stadium; Attendance: 4,100; Referee: (Turkey) Mert Güzenge

11 December 2023 15	MKE Ankaragücü	1–1	Çaykur Rizespor	Ankara
20:00 EEST	Cephas (yellow card) 7'; Moruțan 14'; Sowe (yellow card) 40' (yellow-red card) 50'; Güngördü (yellow card) 83'	Report	Topçu (yellow card) 33' (yellow-red card) 90+5'; Zeqiri (yellow card) 39'; Minchev (yellow card) 66'; Gaich (yellow card) 83' (goal) 90+7'; Højer (yellow card) 90+3'	Stadium: Eryaman Stadium; Referee: (Turkey) Halil Umut Meler

21 December 2023 17	Çaykur Rizespor	5–1	Pendikspor	Rize
17:00 EEST	Gaich 16' 54'; Keser 41' (yellow card) 64'; Varešanović 45+1' 58'; Olawoyin (yellow card) 77'	Report	Akbunar 9'; Welinton (yellow card) 23' (yellow-red card) 62'; Vuković (yellow card) 45+1'	Stadium: City of Rize Stadium; Attendance: 2,840; Referee: (Turkey) Direnç Tonusluoğlu

25 December 2023 18	Kasımpaşa	2–2	Çaykur Rizespor	Istanbul
17:00 EEST	Hajradinović 30'; Nuno da Costa 60'	Report	Gaich 45+2' 73'; Højer (yellow card) 45+6'	Stadium: Recep Tayyip Erdoğan Stadium; Attendance: 1,627; Referee: (Turkey) Turgut Doman

6 January 2024 19	Çaykur Rizespor	2–0	Hatayspor	Rize
13:30 EET	Varešanović 19'; Olawoyin 82'	Report	Ghoulam (yellow card) 56'; Hodžić (yellow card) 63'	Stadium: City of Rize Stadium; Attendance: 3,665; Referee: (Turkey) Cihan Aydın

9 January 2024 16	Çaykur Rizespor	0–4	Beşiktaş	Rize
20:00 EET	Olawoyin (yellow card) 60'; Minchev (yellow card) 82'; Topçu (yellow card) 90+4'	Report	Rashica 4'; Kılıçsoy 45' 46' (yellow card) 66'; Tosun 79'	Stadium: City of Rize Stadium; Attendance: 7,221; Referee: (Turkey) Abdulkadir Bitigen

13 January 2024 20	Çaykur Rizespor	1–0	Adana Demirspor	Rize
19:00 EET	Mocsi 54'; Pala (yellow card) 73'	Report		Stadium: City of Rize Stadium; Attendance: 2,676; Referee: (Turkey) Volkan Bayarslan

20 January 2024 21	Alanyaspor	2–1	Çaykur Rizespor	Alanya
16:00 EET	João Novais (yellow card) 14'; Karaca 70'; Aliti (yellow card) 80'; Fer (yellow card) 89'; Sisto 90+1'; Balkovec (yellow card) 90+2'	Report	Varešanović 51'	Stadium: Alanya Oba Stadium; Referee: (Turkey) Ali Şansalan

25 January 2024 22	Çaykur Rizespor	–	Trabzonspor	Rize
20:00 EET				Stadium: City of Rize Stadium

3 February 2024 24	Çaykur Rizespor	0–0	Konyaspor	Rize
13:30 TRT (UTC+3)	Şahin (yellow card) 45+1'		Moreno (yellow card) 90+2'	Stadium: City of Rize Stadium; Referee: Cihan Aydın

11 February 2024 25	Sivasspor	1–0	Çaykur Rizespor	Sivas
13:30 TRT (UTC+3)	Manaj 30'; Akdağ (yellow card) 58'		Topçu (yellow card) 67'	Stadium: New Sivas 4 Eylül Stadium; Referee: Emre Kargın

=== Turkish Cup ===
7 December 2023 Round 4	Çaykur Rizespor	4–0	Bucaspor 1928	Rize
19:00 EET	Gaich 41' 47' 88'; Varešanović 70'; Eray Korkmaz (yellow card) 89'	Report		Stadium: City of Rize Stadium; Referee: (Turkey) Mehmet Türkmen

16 January 2024 Round of 32	MKE Ankaragücü	3–1	Çaykur Rizespor	Ankara
19:00 EET	Güneren 57'; Ciğerci 90+7' (pen.); Moruțan 90+11' (pen.)	Report	Pala 83' (yellow card) 90+6'; Şahin (yellow card) 90+10'	Stadium: Eryaman Stadium; Attendance: 639; Referee: (Turkey) Sarper Saka
