= 2026–27 Çaykur Rizespor season =

Çaykur Rizespor
2026–27 season
- President: Ali Zeki Saruhan
- Head coach: Recep Uçar
- Stadium: Rize City Stadium
- Süper Lig: 9th
- Turkish Cup: Fourth round
- Top goalscorer: League: Ali Sowe (2 goals); All: Ali Sowe (2 goals)
- Biggest win: Eyüpspor 0–2 Çaykur Rizespor
- Biggest defeat: Çaykur Rizespor 0–2 Samsunspor

The 2026–27 season is the 74th season in the history of Çaykur Rizespor, and the club's 24th consecutive season in the Süper Lig.

== Transfers ==
=== In ===
| Date | Pos. | Player | From | Fee | Notes | Ref. |
|---|---|---|---|---|---|---|
| 1 July 2026 | DF | (Morocco) Zakaria Ariss | (France) Bastia | €1,5M | | |
| 1 July 2026 | DF | (France) Siaka Bakayoko | (France) Amiens | €1,2M | | |
| 8 July 2026 | DF | (Mali) Modibo Sagnan | (France) Montpellier | €1,0M | Loan made permanent | |
| 13 August 2026 | DF | (Turkey) Umut Erdem | (Turkey) Galatasaray | €454,000 | | |
| 25 August 2026 | MF | (Romania) Iustin Doicaru | (Romania) Farul Constanța | €1,5M | | |

== Competitions ==
=== Overall Record ===
| Competition | First match | Last match | Starting round | Record | | | | | | | |
| Competition | First match | Last match | Starting round | Pld | W | D | L | GF | GA | GD | Win % |
|---|---|---|---|---|---|---|---|---|---|---|---|
| Süper Lig | 15 August 2026 | TBD | Matchday 1 | 6 | 3 | 1 | 2 | 7 | 6 | +1 | 50.00 |
| Turkish Cup | December 2026 | TBD | Fourth round | | | | | — | | | |
| Total | | | | 6 | 3 | 1 | 2 | 7 | 6 | +1 | 50.00 |

Last updated: 20 September 2026
Source: Competitions

=== Süper Lig ===
==== League table ====
| Pos | Team | Pld | W | D | L | GF | GA | GD | Pts |
|---|---|---|---|---|---|---|---|---|---|
| 7 | Kocaelispor | 7 | 4 | 0 | 3 | 8 | 6 | +2 | 12 |
| 8 | Çorum | 7 | 3 | 1 | 3 | 16 | 12 | +4 | 10 |
| 9 | Rizespor | 7 | 3 | 1 | 3 | 7 | 9 | −2 | 10 |
| 10 | Kasımpaşa | 7 | 2 | 4 | 1 | 8 | 8 | 0 | 10 |
| 11 | Başakşehir | 7 | 2 | 2 | 3 | 10 | 11 | −1 | 8 |

Updated to match(es) played on 11 October 2026. Source: Süper Lig
Rules for classification: 1) Points; 2) Head-to-head points; 3) Head-to-head goal difference; 4) Head-to-head goals scored; 5) Goal difference; 6) Goals scored; 7) Play-off.
(Note: Head-to-head record is used only after all the matches between the teams in question have been played)

==== Result summary ====
| Overall | | | | | | | | Home | | | | | | Away | | | | | |
| Pld | W | D | L | GF | GA | GD | Pts | W | D | L | GF | GA | GD | W | D | L | GF | GA | GD |
|---|---|---|---|---|---|---|---|---|---|---|---|---|---|---|---|---|---|---|---|
| 6 | 3 | 1 | 2 | 7 | 6 | +1 | 10 | 0 | 0 | 2 | 0 | 3 | −3 | 3 | 1 | 0 | 7 | 3 | +4 |

Last updated: 20 September 2026.
Source: TFF.org

Pld = Matches played; W = Matches won; D = Matches drawn; L = Matches lost; GF = Goals for; GA = Goals against; GD = Goal difference; Pts = Points

==== Results by round ====
| Round | 1 | 2 | 3 | 4 | 5 | 6 | 7 | 8 | 9 | 10 | 11 | 12 | 13 | 14 | 15 | 16 | 17 | 18 | 19 | 20 | 21 | 22 | 23 | 24 | 25 | 26 | 27 | 28 | 29 | 30 | 31 | 32 | 33 | 34 |
|---|---|---|---|---|---|---|---|---|---|---|---|---|---|---|---|---|---|---|---|---|---|---|---|---|---|---|---|---|---|---|---|---|---|---|
| Ground | A | H | A | H | A | A | H | A | H | A | H | A | H | A | H | A | H | H | A | H | A | H | H | A | H | A | H | A | H | A | H | A | H | A |
| Result | W | L | W | L | W | D | | | | | | | | | | | | | | | | | | | | | | | | | | | | |
| Position | 5 | 13 | 7 | 11 | 5 | 9 | | | | | | | | | | | | | | | | | | | | | | | | | | | | |

Updated to match(es) played on 20 September 2026. Source: TFF.org
A = Away; H = Home; W = Win; D = Draw; L = Loss; P = Postponed

==== Matches ====
| 15 August 2026 1 | Konyaspor | 0–1 | Çaykur Rizespor | Konya |
| 19:00 TRT (GMT+3) | | Report | Laci 90+7' (pen.) | Stadium: Konya Municipality Stadium; Referee: Cihan Aydın |

| 22 August 2026 2 | Çaykur Rizespor | 0–2 | Samsunspor | Rize |
| 19:00 TRT (GMT+3) | | Report | Mendes 34'; Kaya 63' | Stadium: Rize City Stadium; Referee: Ömer Faruk Turtay |

| 29 August 2026 3 | Gaziantep | 1–2 | Çaykur Rizespor | Gaziantep |
| 21:30 TRT (GMT+3) | Ariss 90' (o.g.) | Report | Emrecan Bulut 12'; Sowe 35' | Stadium: Gaziantep Stadium; Referee: Batuhan Kolak |

| 7 September 2026 4 | Çaykur Rizespor | 0–1 | Alanyaspor | Rize |
| 20:00 TRT (GMT+3) | | Report | Ariss 70' (o.g.) | Stadium: Rize City Stadium; Referee: Abdullah Buğra Taşkınsoy |

| 12 September 2026 5 | Eyüpspor | 0–2 | Çaykur Rizespor | Istanbul |
| 17:00 TRT (GMT+3) | | Report | Sowe 21'; Bulut 90+1' | Stadium: Necmi Kadıoğlu Stadium; Referee: Oğuzhan Aksu |

| 20 September 2026 6 | Göztepe | 2–2 | Çaykur Rizespor | İzmir |
| 20:00 TRT (GMT+3) | Kurtulan 2'; Bekiroğlu 90+4' (pen.) | Report | Olawoyin 70'; Iustin Doicaru 80' | Stadium: Gürsel Aksel Stadium; Referee: Oğuzhan Çakır |

| 10 October 2026 7 | Çaykur Rizespor | v | Fenerbahçe | Rize |
| 19:00 TRT (GMT+3) | | Report | | Stadium: Rize City Stadium |

| 16 October 2026 8 | Çorum | v | Çaykur Rizespor | Çorum |
| 20:00 TRT (GMT+3) | | Report | | Stadium: Çorum Şehir Stadium |

| 26 October 2026 9 | Çaykur Rizespor | v | Trabzonspor | Rize |
| 19:00 TRT (GMT+3) | | Report | | Stadium: Rize City Stadium |

| 31 October 2026 10 | Kocaelispor | v | Çaykur Rizespor | Kocaeli |
| 16:00 TRT (GMT+3) | | Report | | Stadium: Kocaeli Stadium |

| 8 November 2026 11 | Çaykur Rizespor | v | Erzurumspor | Rize |
| 13:30 TRT (GMT+3) | | Report | | Stadium: Rize City Stadium |

| 21 November 2026 12 | Amed | v | Çaykur Rizespor | Diyarbakır |
| 16:00 TRT (GMT+3) | | Report | | Stadium: Diyarbakır Stadium |

| 27 November 2026 13 | Çaykur Rizespor | v | Kasımpaşa | Rize |
| 20:00 TRT (GMT+3) | | Report | | Stadium: Rize City Stadium |

| 4 December 2026 14 | Galatasaray | v | Çaykur Rizespor | Istanbul |
| 20:00 TRT (GMT+3) | | Report | | Stadium: Ali Sami Yen Sports Complex |

| 13 December 2026 15 | Çaykur Rizespor | v | İstanbul Başakşehir | Rize |
| 16:00 TRT (GMT+3) | | Report | | Stadium: Rize City Stadium |

| 20 December 2026 16 | Beşiktaş | v | Çaykur Rizespor | Istanbul |
| 19:00 TRT (GMT+3) | | Report | | Stadium: Beşiktaş Stadium |

| January 2027 17 | Çaykur Rizespor | v | Gençlerbirliği | Rize |
| TRT (GMT+3) | | Report | | Stadium: Rize City Stadium |

| January 2027 18 | Çaykur Rizespor | v | Konyaspor | Rize |
| TRT (GMT+3) | | Report | | Stadium: Rize City Stadium |

| January 2027 19 | Samsunspor | v | Çaykur Rizespor | Samsun |
| TRT (GMT+3) | | Report | | Stadium: Samsun 19 May Stadium |

| February 2027 20 | Çaykur Rizespor | v | Gaziantep | Rize |
| TRT (GMT+3) | | Report | | Stadium: Rize City Stadium |

| February 2027 21 | Alanyaspor | v | Çaykur Rizespor | Alanya, Antalya |
| TRT (GMT+3) | | Report | | Stadium: Alanya Oba Stadium |

| February 2027 22 | Çaykur Rizespor | v | Eyüpspor | Rize |
| TRT (GMT+3) | | Report | | Stadium: Rize City Stadium |

| February 2027 23 | Çaykur Rizespor | v | Göztepe | Rize |
| TRT (GMT+3) | | | | Stadium: Rize City Stadium |

| March 2027 24 | Fenerbahçe | v | Çaykur Rizespor | Istanbul |
| TRT (GMT+3) | | Report | | Stadium: Şükrü Saraçoğlu Stadium |

| March 2027 25 | Çaykur Rizespor | v | Çorum | Rize |
| TRT (GMT+3) | | Report | | Stadium: Rize City Stadium |

| March 2027 26 | Trabzonspor | v | Çaykur Rizespor | Trabzon |
| TRT (GMT+3) | | Report | | Stadium: Şenol Güneş Sports Complex |

| April 2027 27 | Çaykur Rizespor | v | Kocaelispor | Rize |
| TRT (GMT+3) | | Report | | Stadium: Rize City Stadium |

| April 2027 28 | Erzurumspor | v | Çaykur Rizespor | Erzurum |
| TRT (GMT+3) | | Report | | Stadium: Kazım Karabekir Stadium |

| April 2027 29 | Çaykur Rizespor | v | Amed | Rize |
| TRT (GMT+3) | | Report | | Stadium: Rize City Stadium |

| April 2027 30 | Kasımpaşa | v | Çaykur Rizespor | Istanbul |
| TRT (GMT+3) | | Report | | Stadium: Recep Tayyip Erdoğan Stadium |

| May 2027 31 | Çaykur Rizespor | v | Galatasaray | Rize |
| TRT (GMT+3) | | Report | | Stadium: Rize City Stadium |

| May 2027 32 | İstanbul Başakşehir | v | Çaykur Rizespor | Istanbul |
| TRT (GMT+3) | | Report | | Stadium: Başakşehir Fatih Terim Stadium |

| May 2027 33 | Çaykur Rizespor | v | Beşiktaş | Rize |
| TRT (GMT+3) | | Report | | Stadium: Rize City Stadium |

| May 2027 34 | Gençlerbirliği | v | Çaykur Rizespor | Ankara |
| TRT (GMT+3) | | Report | | Stadium: Eryaman Stadium |

=== Turkish Cup ===
==== Fourth round ====
| December 2026 4T | v |
| TRT (GMT+3) |
