= Varešanović =

Varešanović is a surname. Notable people with the surname include:

- Dal Varešanović (born 2001), Bosnian footballer
- Hari Varešanović (born 1961), Bosnian musician
- Mak Varešanović (born 1998), Bosnian footballer
- Mirza Varešanović (born 1972), Bosnia and Herzegovina footballer and manager
