= Doicaru =

Doicaru is a Romanian surname. Notable people with the surname include:

- Iustin Doicaru, (born 2007), Romanian footballer
- Nicolae Doicaru (1922–1990), Romanian politician
- Radu Doicaru (born 1979), Romanian football player and manager
