= Jonjo Shelvey =

English footballer (born 1992)

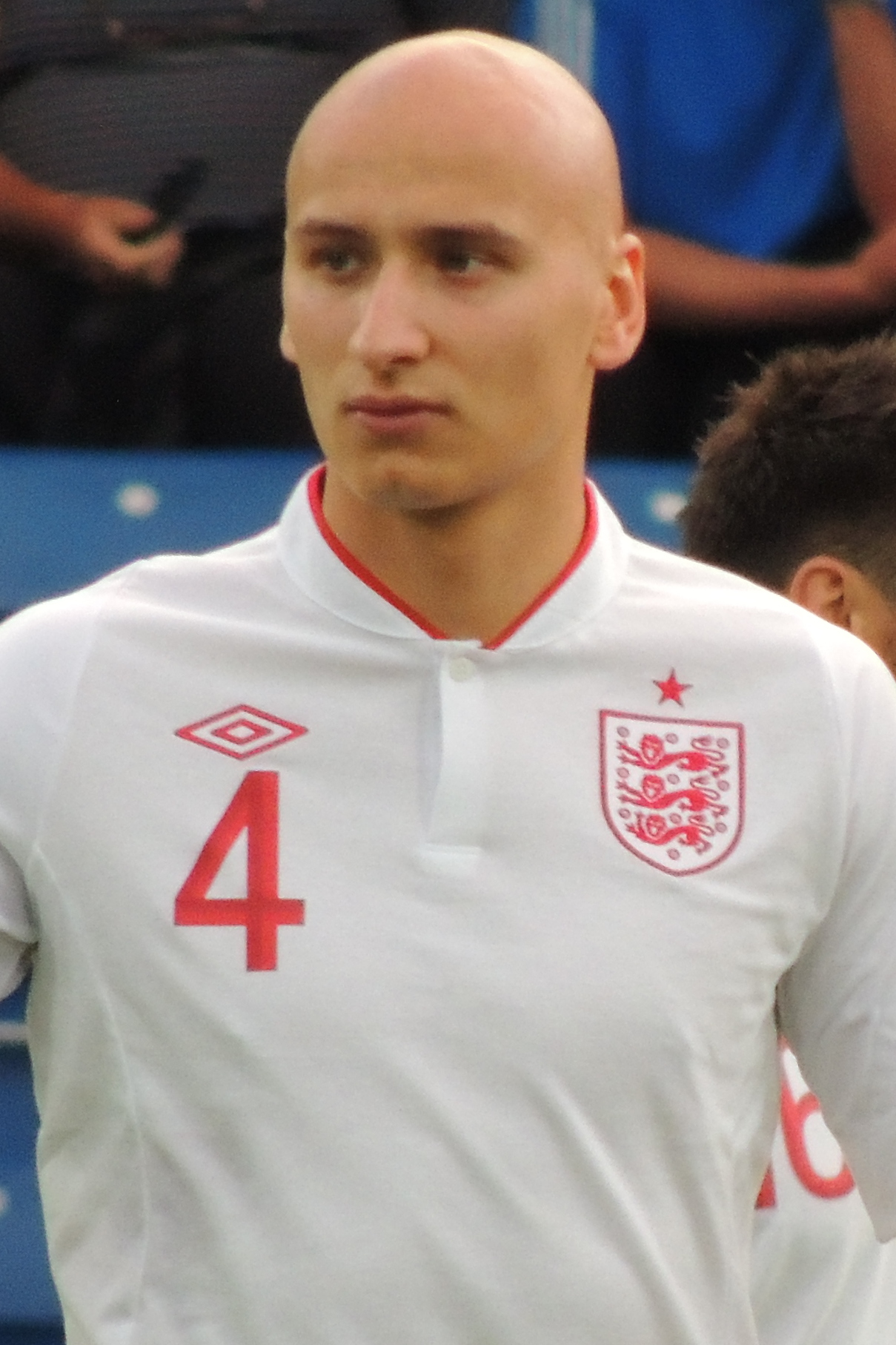
- Shelvey in 2012

Personal information
- Full name: Jonjo Shelvey
- Date of birth: 27 February 1992 (age 34)
- Place of birth: Romford, England
- Height: 6 ft 0 in (1.84 m)
- Position: Central midfielder

Team information
- Current team: Arabian Falcons (manager)

Youth career
- 2001–2002: Arsenal
- 2002–2004: West Ham United
- 2004–2008: Charlton Athletic

Senior career*
| Years | Team | Apps | (Gls) |
| 2008–2010 | Charlton Athletic | 42 | (7) |
| 2010–2013 | Liverpool | 47 | (2) |
| 2011 | → Blackpool (loan) | 10 | (6) |
| 2013–2016 | Swansea City | 79 | (10) |
| 2016–2023 | Newcastle United | 186 | (16) |
| 2023 | Nottingham Forest | 8 | (0) |
| 2023–2024 | Çaykur Rizespor | 32 | (3) |
| 2024–2025 | Eyüpspor | 6 | (0) |
| 2025 | Burnley | 2 | (0) |
| 2025–2026 | Arabian Falcons | 9 | (1) |
| Total | | 421 | (45) |

International career
| 2007–2008 | England U16 | 6 | (3) |
| 2008–2009 | England U17 | 7 | (1) |
| 2009–2010 | England U19 | 4 | (3) |
| 2011–2013 | England U21 | 13 | (4) |
| 2012–2015 | England | 6 | (0) |

Managerial career
- 2026–: Arabian Falcons
- * Club domestic league appearances and goals as of 06:50, 15 April 2026 (UTC)

Jonjo Shelvey (born 27 February 1992) is an English football coach and former player who played as a central midfielder. He is head coach of UAE Second Division League side Arabian Falcons.

Shelvey began his career at Charlton Athletic, becoming their youngest-ever player at 16 years and 59 days old. In 2010, he moved to Liverpool for an initial £1.7 million, spending a brief loan at Blackpool. During his time at Anfield, Shelvey was part of a Liverpool squad which won the League Cup and lost the FA Cup final in 2012. He joined Swansea City for £5 million in 2013, and Newcastle United for £12 million two and a half years later. A month after joining Newcastle, he was made the team's stand-in captain in the absence of Fabricio Coloccini, as the season ended with relegation. He then helped the club regain Premier League status, and established himself as the vice captain. After leaving Newcastle in 2023, he had spells at Nottingham Forest, Çaykur Rizespor, Eyüpspor, Burnley and Arabian Falcons, where he began his managerial career in 2026.

Shelvey played for England at under-16, under-17, under-19 and under-21 level, and captained the under-19 team. He played six games for the senior team between 2012 and 2015.

== Club career ==
=== Charlton Athletic ===
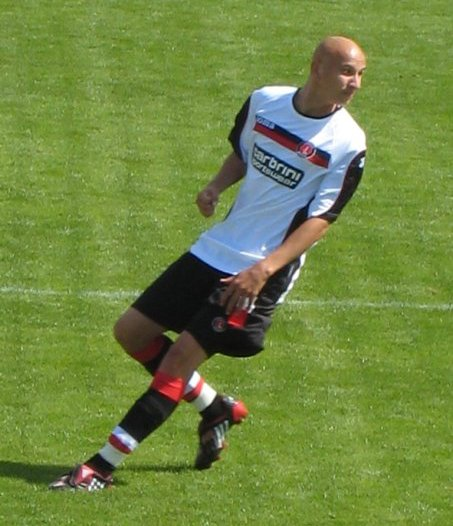
Shelvey warming up for Charlton Athletic in 2008

Shelvey played in the youth teams of first Arsenal and then West Ham United, the team he had supported as a boy. In 2004, he moved to Charlton Athletic, making his breakthrough in the 2007–08 season after scoring 14 goals in 23 appearances for Charlton's under-18 team. He made his first-team debut on 26 April 2008, starting in a 3–0 away loss against Barnsley in the Championship. He became Charlton's youngest-ever player, at the age of 16 years and 59 days – beating the previous holder, Paul Konchesky. He still had one week of school remaining when he was given his debut by manager Alan Pardew.

On 3 January 2009, Shelvey became Charlton's youngest-ever goal-scorer, with a strike against Norwich City in the third round of the FA Cup, opening a 1–1 draw. It was 54 days before his 17th birthday, breaking the previous record held by Peter Reeves who was aged 17 years and 100 days when he scored – also against Norwich – in May 1996. Despite interest from several Premier League clubs, on 27 February, his 17th birthday, Shelvey signed his first professional contract with Charlton. He scored his first league goal in the 3–2 win at Southampton on 4 April. Later that month, he scored in consecutive matches, 2–2 home draws against Blackpool and Cardiff City; the season ended with relegation to League One.

In September 2009, he signed a one-year contract extension until 2012. Shelvey contributed four goals from 24 league appearances as Charlton reached the promotion play-offs.

=== Liverpool ===
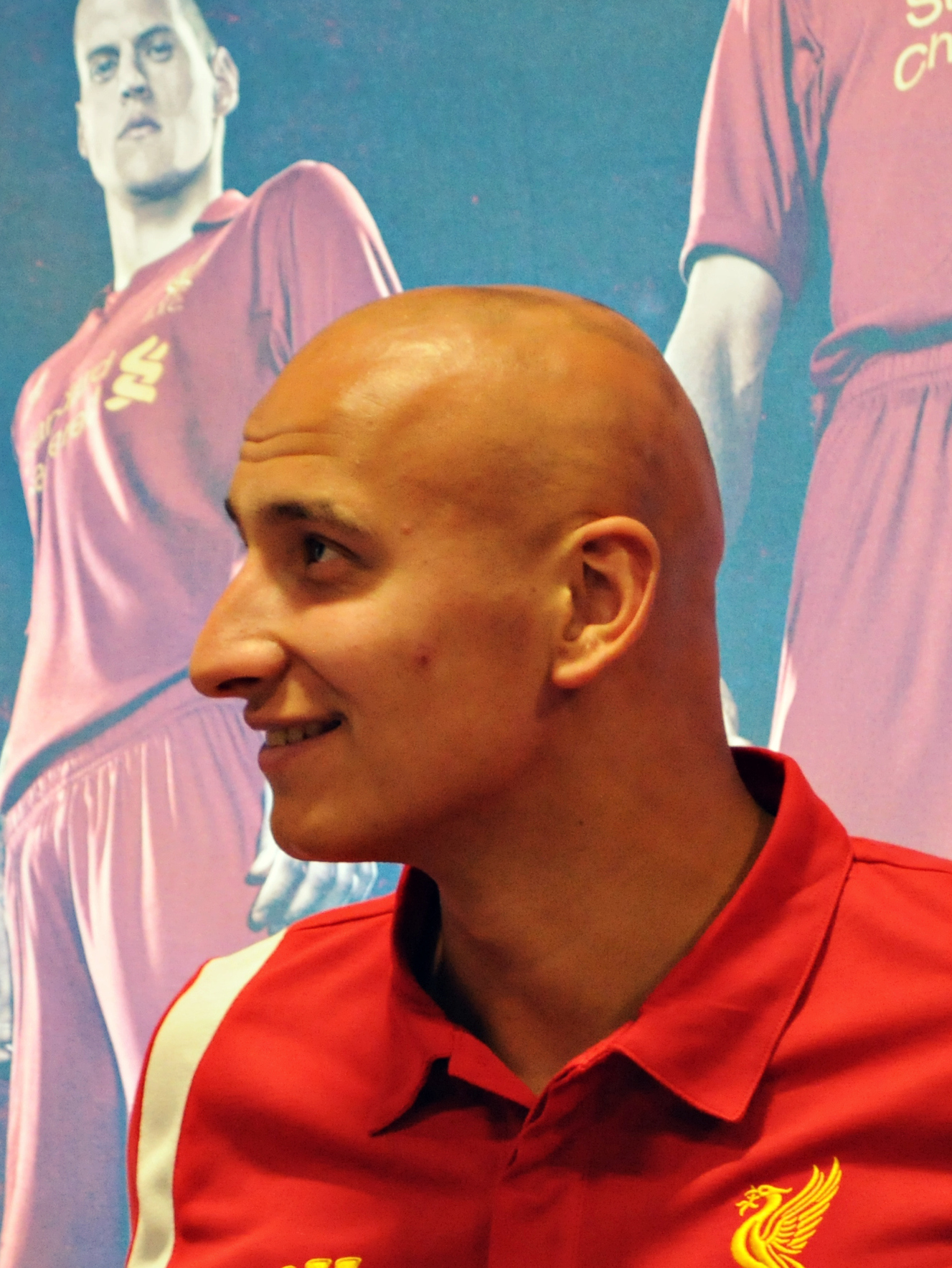
Shelvey with Liverpool in 2012

Shelvey signed for Liverpool in May 2010, for an initial fee of £1.7 million. Shelvey made his debut for the club as an extra-time substitute on 22 September in the Reds' shock League Cup third-round defeat against League Two team Northampton Town at Anfield, with Liverpool losing 4–2 on penalties (with Shelvey scoring in the shootout) after a 2–2 draw. Shelvey started his first match for the club in Liverpool's Europa League group match against Napoli on 21 October 2010, playing the whole 90 minutes match in a 0–0 draw. On 24 October, Shelvey made his Premier League debut against Blackburn Rovers at Anfield, coming on for the final stages in place of Raul Meireles in the Reds' 2–1 win.

Shelvey joined Championship club Blackpool on loan on 30 September 2011. The following day he scored on his debut, in a 5–0 win against Bristol City at Bloomfield Road, and also scored his first professional hat-trick in a 5–0 win away at Leeds United on 3 November.

On 30 November 2011, he was recalled by Liverpool due to injury problems within the team, mainly surrounding Steven Gerrard and Lucas Leiva, with the latter set to miss the remainder of the season. He made his first ever Premier League start the following weekend against Aston Villa. On 6 January 2012 he scored his first senior goal for the club in a 5–1 win in a third round FA Cup tie against Oldham Athletic at Anfield, and on 8 May he scored his first Premier League goal with a 30-yard strike in a 4–1 home win over Chelsea. He was absent from Liverpool's win over Cardiff City in the season's League Cup Final, and was an unused substitute in their loss to Chelsea in the FA Cup equivalent.

On 10 July 2012, Shelvey signed a new long-term contract with Liverpool. On 20 September 2012 he came off the bench to score the last 2 goals in a 5–3 win against Young Boys in the Europa League. Three days later, he was sent off in a league match against Manchester United on 23 September 2012. He finished the Europa League group stage with four goals, adding one each in a home defeat to Udinese on 4 October, and a draw with Young Boys on 22 November.

=== Swansea City ===
On 3 July 2013, Shelvey signed a four-year contract with Swansea City, for an initial transfer fee of £5 million. He scored his first goal for the club on 16 September 2013, in a 2–2 draw with former club Liverpool, also assisting teammate Michu's goal, but was partly responsible for both Liverpool goals, giving the ball away to Daniel Sturridge and Victor Moses. He scored a goal on 26 April 2014 in a 4–1 defeat of Aston Villa; from Brad Guzan's clearance, Shelvey "controlled the ball with one touch before propelling it over the back-pedalling American's head and into the net."

Shelvey was sent off in a goalless draw at Everton on 1 November 2014, by getting two bookings. First, he kicked the ball away in the 24th minute, then in the 72nd minute, he blocked James McCarthy's run, resulting in the second booking. On 29 December, he caught Liverpool's Emre Can with his arm during a 4–1 away defeat. Although referee Andre Marriner did not punish him for it, the Football Association later gave Shelvey a four-match suspension for violent conduct, with one match having been added to the suspension because of his previous dismissal against Everton. He claimed that the act was unintentional and personally apologised to Can. The day before the Liverpool match, Swansea manager Garry Monk criticised Shelvey's disciplinary record, telling him to "wise up" and put a stop to an accumulation of yellow cards earned through "laziness".

In July 2015, Shelvey signed a new, four-year deal with the Swans, which would have kept him at the club until the summer of 2019.

On 10 January 2016, following a shock 3–2 defeat to League Two team Oxford United in the FA Cup, Shelvey appeared to become embroiled in a row with one Swansea fan and then appeared to invite the man to meet him outside. Manager Alan Curtis responded stating "we expect more from Jonjo, it is as simple as that".

=== Newcastle United ===
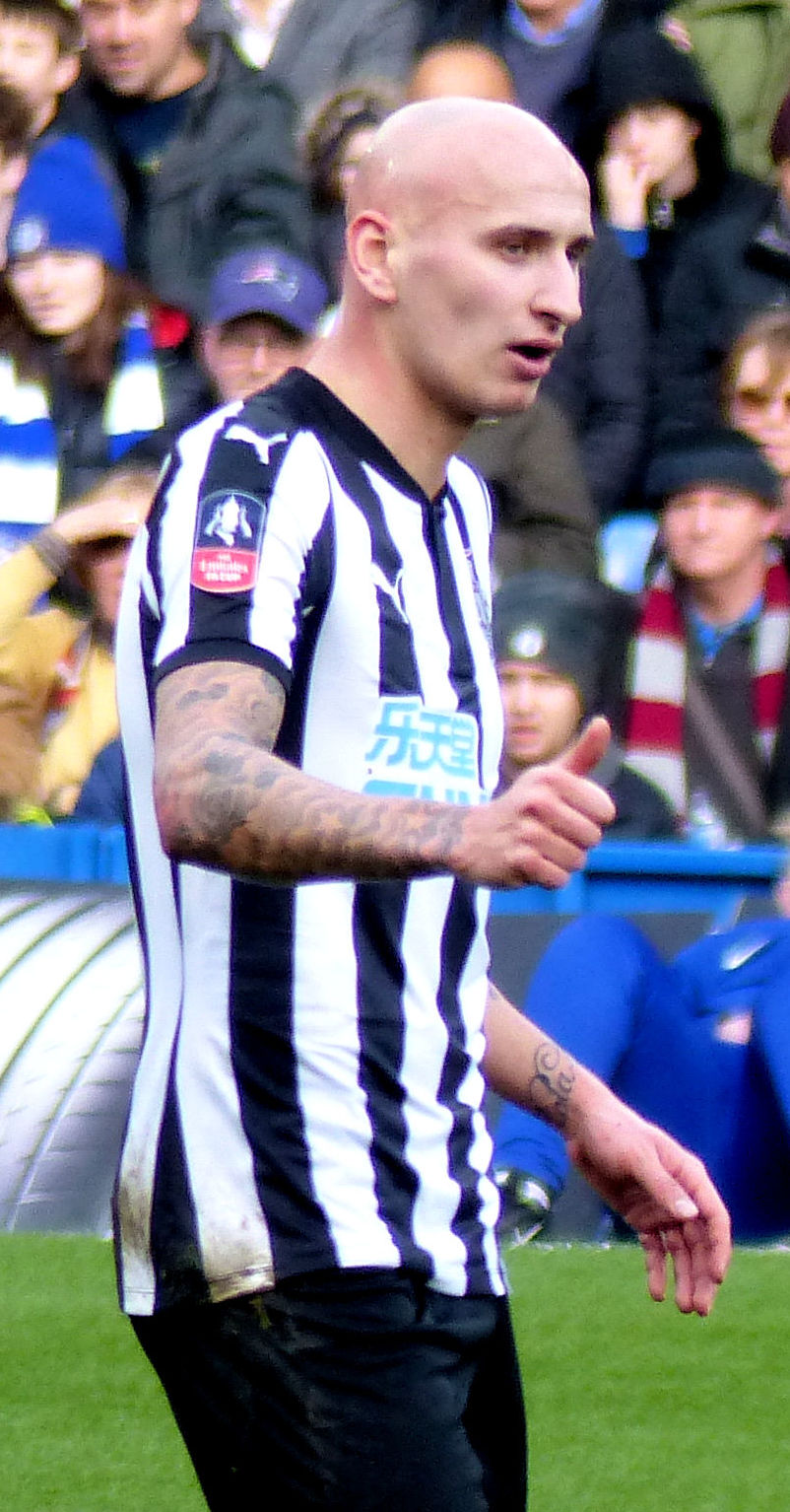
Shelvey playing for Newcastle United in 2018

On 12 January 2016, Newcastle United announced they had signed Shelvey on a five-and-a-half-year deal, for a reported fee of £12 million. Four days later he made his debut in a 2–1 Premier League victory over West Ham United, the first win for the club in seven matches. He was named man of the match for his involvement in the build-up to both of Newcastle's goals. While Newcastle were on a training break in La Manga on 20 February, manager Steve McClaren announced that Shelvey had been made the team's captain. He served the role as Fabricio Coloccini stayed out through a calf injury, and said that he wanted to help the club avoid relegation; they were unsuccessful in that aim.

On 27 August 2016, Shelvey scored his first goal for the club in a 2–0 win against Brighton & Hove Albion. In December 2016, Shelvey was banned for five matches after being found guilty of using racially abusive language towards Wolverhampton Wanderers' Romain Saïss, in a match on 17 September. He was also fined £100,000 and ordered to attend a Football Association education course. During the 2016–17 season, which saw Newcastle promoted to the Premier League, he made 47 appearances in all competitions, and scored five goals (with three of them coming against Queens Park Rangers).

Ahead of the new season, Shelvey changed his squad number from 12 to 8. On 13 August 2017, in Newcastle's first match back in the Premier League against Tottenham Hotspur, Shelvey was sent off three minutes into the second half of the match, for stepping on Tottenham midfielder Dele Alli. Newcastle would go on to lose the match 2–0, with Shelvey later apologising for his violent conduct. On 13 December in a loss to Everton, he was once again sent off for a second bookable offence. Over the course of the season, he made 32 appearances in all competitions, during which time he scored twice, against Leicester City in the league and against Luton Town in the FA Cup. The following season, Shelvey played less matches, mainly due to a hamstring strain. He scored his only goal of the season on 12 May 2019, the last day of the season, in a 4–0 win over Fulham.

In the 2019–20 season, Shelvey alternated between the centre and defensive midfield positions (and occasionally as an attacking midfielder), making 29 appearances in all competitions. He finished the season as Newcastle's top scorer with six goals, helped significantly by three consecutive goals during November and December 2019. One of these goals was a late equaliser against defending league champions Manchester City, described by BBC Sport as a "stunner". This matched the lowest total in the Premier League era, which had previously happened in the 1997–98 and 2000–01 seasons. In the 2020–21 season, Shelvey continued to alternate between the centre and defensive midfield positions, making 32 appearances in all competitions. He scored twice during the season; against Crystal Palace in the league and against Newport County in the EFL Cup.

Prior to the 2021–22 season, Shelvey struggled to shake off a calf injury in time for the club's opening fixture against West Ham United. Although he played in that match, he ended up aggravating the injury and was ruled out for several weeks. He returned against Tottenham, in the first match following the Saudi-backed takeover of the club, coming on as a second-half substitute, but he was later sent off for a second bookable offence. After serving a one match suspension, Shelvey was usually deployed as a defensive midfielder under new manager Eddie Howe. On 16 December, he scored the opening goal against his former club Liverpool in an eventual 3–1 loss. On 22 January 2022, Shelvey scored a direct free-kick in an 1–0 win over Leeds United, kickstarting a seven-match unbeaten run. This result has since been recognised as one of the most important moments of Howe's tenure at Newcastle. However, a reoccurrence of his earlier calf troubles saw him miss the final three matches of the season.

Despite working hard over the summer to maintain his fitness, Shelvey suffered a hamstring injury in a pre-season match against Benfica. He returned in October, coming on as late substitute in a win over Tottenham. He would go on to play four more times, twice in the league and twice in the EFL Cup.

=== Nottingham Forest ===
On 31 January 2023, Shelvey joined Nottingham Forest on a two-and-a-half-year contract. He made his Forest debut in a 2–0 loss against Fulham on 11 February. After being dropped against Manchester United following a poor performance against Aston Villa on 8 April, Shelvey reportedly reacted poorly to being named on the substitutes' bench for the upcoming 22 April fixture against Liverpool and was sent home by Forest manager Steve Cooper. Despite Cooper asserting that there was no problem between them, Shelvey failed to make any further appearances, and was subsequently left out of Forest's 2023–24 pre-season training camp, not given a squad number for the new season, and made available for transfer.

=== Çaykur Rizespor ===
On 14 September 2023, Shelvey joined Turkish Süper Lig club Çaykur Rizespor. The move was originally reported to be a loan, but was later reported to be a permanent free transfer. Two days later, he made his debut for the club in a 2–1 win over Konyaspor, and assisted the winning goal scored by Adolfo Gaich. On 12 November, he scored a goal from inside his own half in a win over İstanbulspor.

=== Eyüpspor ===
On 27 August 2024, Shelvey joined Turkish Süper Lig club Eyüpspor. He was released by the club in the first week of January 2025.

=== Burnley ===
On 20 January 2025, Shelvey signed for Championship club Burnley on a free transfer until the end of the 2024–25 season.

On 20 May 2025, the club announced he would be leaving in June when his contract expired.

=== Arabian Falcons ===
On 27 September 2025, Shelvey signed for UAE Second Division League club Arabian Falcons.

On 15 April 2026, Shelvey announced that he had ended his playing career and would be the manager.

== International career ==
=== Youth ===
Shelvey captained the England under-16s as they won the 2007 Victory Shield scoring three goals in three matches. He played a key role in the Montaigu Tournament, which England won for the first time in seven years, playing in all four matches and scoring a free kick in the final against France. In October 2008, he made his debut for the England under-17s and scored in a 7–0 win over Estonia.

On his debut for the England under-19s, in September 2010, he captained and scored a free-kick in a 2–0 win over Slovakia, and followed up by scoring on his following two appearances for the team. He won his first Under-21 cap coming on as substitute in a 6–0 win against Azerbaijan in September 2011.

England's senior manager Roy Hodgson claimed that Shelvey missed the 2015 UEFA European Under-21 Championship because he was "reticent" about playing at that level following his senior international debut. Shelvey responded by saying that he had been told by under-21 manager Gareth Southgate that he would not feature in that squad, and claimed that if he had ever refused international duty he would have faced the wrath of his father.

=== Senior ===
Shelvey was eligible to play for Scotland – through his grandfather – and the Republic of Ireland, but chose to represent England. In October 2012 Shelvey was called up for the England squad for two 2014 FIFA World Cup qualification matches against San Marino and Poland, and made his senior debut from the bench on 12 October 2012, in a 5–0 home win against San Marino, replacing Michael Carrick in the 66th minute.

On 5 September 2015, Shelvey was selected to start for England for the first time in a UEFA Euro 2016 qualifying match against San Marino, becoming the first man to be capped for England whilst playing for Swansea City. He was named man of the match by the BBC as England ran out 6–0 winners in Serravalle.

== Personal life ==
Shelvey was born in Romford, Greater London, and grew up in a council flat in Harold Hill. Due to crime in the neighbourhood, he bought his sister a home in Brentwood when she became pregnant. His older brother George was, according to Shelvey, a better footballer, but his career was ruined by drinking and partying. Shelvey is of partial Scottish and Irish Traveller heritage.

Shelvey fell down a staircase as a baby, one of several childhood traumas which he believes could have caused his alopecia. He was prescribed a cream and told to sleep in a woolly hat for a month in order to combat it, but abandoned treatment because of the discomfort it caused, and said of his baldness, "If you don't like it, don't talk to me". Shelvey has supported youngsters who share his condition.

In June 2015, Shelvey married Daisy Evans, formerly of the pop group S Club 8. Comedian Jimmy Carr performed at the marriage. The couple have two daughters and a son.

In October 2025, Shelvey told the BBC that he no longer wanted his children to grow up in England, where he said in places like his hometown things were no longer the same. He said that "the UK isn't what it was 10 to 15 years ago."

== Career statistics ==
=== Club ===
Appearances and goals by club, season and competition
| Club | Season | League | | | National cup (Note: Includes FA Cup, Turkish Cup, UAE President's Cup) | | League cup (Note: Includes Football League/EFL Cup, UAE League Cup) | | Europe | | Other | | Total | |
| Club | Season | Division | Apps | Goals | Apps | Goals | Apps | Goals | Apps | Goals | Apps | Goals | Apps | Goals |
|---|---|---|---|---|---|---|---|---|---|---|---|---|---|---|
| Charlton Athletic | 2007–08 | Championship | 2 | 0 | 0 | 0 | 0 | 0 | — | | — | | 2 | 0 |
| Charlton Athletic | 2008–09 | Championship | 16 | 3 | 3 | 1 | 1 | 0 | — | | — | | 20 | 4 |
| Charlton Athletic | 2009–10 | League One | 24 | 4 | 1 | 0 | 0 | 0 | — | | 2 (Note: Appearances in Football League Trophy) | 0 | 27 | 4 |
| Charlton Athletic | Total | | 42 | 7 | 4 | 1 | 1 | 0 | — | | 2 | 0 | 49 | 8 |
| Liverpool | 2010–11 | Premier League | 15 | 0 | 1 | 0 | 1 | 0 | 4 (Note: Appearances in UEFA Europa League) | 0 | — | | 21 | 0 |
| Liverpool | 2011–12 | Premier League | 13 | 1 | 2 | 1 | 1 | 0 | — | | — | | 16 | 2 |
| Liverpool | 2012–13 | Premier League | 19 | 1 | 2 | 0 | 1 | 0 | 10 | 4 | — | | 32 | 5 |
| Liverpool | Total | | 47 | 2 | 5 | 1 | 3 | 0 | 14 | 4 | — | | 69 | 7 |
| Blackpool (loan) | 2011–12 | Championship | 10 | 6 | — | | — | | — | | — | | 10 | 6 |
| Swansea City | 2013–14 | Premier League | 32 | 6 | 1 | 0 | 1 | 0 | 8 | 0 | — | | 42 | 6 |
| Swansea City | 2014–15 | Premier League | 31 | 3 | 1 | 0 | 3 | 0 | — | | — | | 35 | 3 |
| Swansea City | 2015–16 | Premier League | 16 | 1 | 1 | 0 | 2 | 0 | — | | — | | 19 | 1 |
| Swansea City | Total | | 79 | 10 | 3 | 0 | 6 | 0 | 8 | 0 | — | | 96 | 10 |
| Newcastle United | 2015–16 | Premier League | 15 | 0 | — | | — | | — | | — | | 15 | 0 |
| Newcastle United | 2016–17 | Championship | 42 | 5 | 1 | 0 | 4 | 0 | — | | — | | 47 | 5 |
| Newcastle United | 2017–18 | Premier League | 30 | 1 | 2 | 1 | 0 | 0 | — | | — | | 32 | 2 |
| Newcastle United | 2018–19 | Premier League | 16 | 1 | 1 | 0 | 0 | 0 | — | | — | | 17 | 1 |
| Newcastle United | 2019–20 | Premier League | 26 | 6 | 2 | 0 | 1 | 0 | — | | — | | 29 | 6 |
| Newcastle United | 2020–21 | Premier League | 30 | 1 | 0 | 0 | 2 | 1 | — | | — | | 32 | 2 |
| Newcastle United | 2021–22 | Premier League | 24 | 2 | 1 | 0 | 0 | 0 | — | | — | | 25 | 2 |
| Newcastle United | 2022–23 | Premier League | 3 | 0 | 0 | 0 | 2 | 0 | — | | — | | 5 | 0 |
| Newcastle United | Total | | 186 | 16 | 7 | 1 | 9 | 1 | — | | — | | 202 | 18 |
| Nottingham Forest | 2022–23 | Premier League | 8 | 0 | — | | — | | — | | — | | 8 | 0 |
| Çaykur Rizespor | 2023–24 | Süper Lig | 32 | 3 | 1 | 0 | — | | — | | — | | 33 | 3 |
| Eyüpspor | 2024–25 | Süper Lig | 6 | 0 | 0 | 0 | — | | — | | — | | 6 | 0 |
| Burnley | 2024–25 | Championship | 2 | 0 | 2 | 0 | — | | — | | — | | 4 | 0 |
| Arabian Falcons | 2025–26 | UAE Second Division League | 9 | 1 | 0 | 0 | 0 | 0 | — | | — | | 9 | 1 |
| Career total | | | 421 | 45 | 22 | 3 | 19 | 1 | 22 | 4 | 2 | 0 | 486 | 53 |

=== International ===
Appearances and goals by national team and year
| National team | Year | Apps | Goals |
|---|---|---|---|
| England | 2012 | 1 | 0 |
| England | 2015 | 5 | 0 |
| Total | | 6 | 0 |

== Honours ==
Liverpool

- FA Cup runner-up: 2011–12

Newcastle United

- EFL Championship: 2016–17

Individual

- PFA Team of the Year: 2016–17 Championship
