= 2024–25 Çaykur Rizespor season =

Çaykur Rizespor
2024–25 season
- Manager: İlhan Palut
- Stadium: Rize City Stadium
- Süper Lig: 9th
- Turkish Cup: Group stage
- Top goalscorer: League: Ali Sowe (19; All: Ali Sowe (19)
- Average home league attendance: 5,871
- Biggest win: Adana Demirspor 1–2 Rizespor

The 2024–25 season was the 72nd season in the history of Çaykur Rizespor, and the club's second consecutive season in Süper Lig. In addition to the domestic league, the team participated in the Turkish Cup.

== Transfers ==
=== In ===
| Pos. | Player | Transferred from | Fee | Date | Source |
|---|---|---|---|---|---|
| MF | (Bosnia and Herzegovina) Muhamed Buljubašić | (Bosnia and Herzegovina) FK Sarajevo | €1,500,000 | 29 July 2024 | |

== Friendlies ==
=== Pre-season ===
| 14 July 2024 Friendly | Rizespor (Turkey) | 0–5 | (Ukraine) Shakhtar Donetsk | Slovenia |
| | | | Nazaryna 12'; Vinicius Tobias 18'; Kelsy 55'; Matviyenko 81'; Baglay 93' (pen.) |
Note: 2 x 50 minutes

| 20 July 2024 Friendly | Austria Klagenfurt | 1–2 | (Turkey) Rizespor | Slovenia |
| 17:00 UTC+2 | Bobzien 48' | Report | Olawoyin 19'; Zeqiri 37' |

| 23 July 2024 Friendly | Kryvbas Kryvyi Rih (Ukraine) | 3–4 | (Turkey) Rizespor |
| 17:15 |

| 27 July 2024 Friendly | Rizespor (Turkey) | 2–2 | (France) Nice |
| 16:00 |

== Competitions ==
=== Overall record ===
| Competition | First match | Last match | Starting round | Record | | | | | | | |
| Competition | First match | Last match | Starting round | Pld | W | D | L | GF | GA | GD | Win % |
|---|---|---|---|---|---|---|---|---|---|---|---|
| Süper Lig | 12 August 2024 | | Matchday 1 | 2 | 1 | 1 | 0 | 3 | 2 | +1 | 50.00 |
| Turkish Cup | | | | 0 | 0 | 0 | 0 | 0 | 0 | +0 | — |
| Total | | | | 2 | 1 | 1 | 0 | 3 | 2 | +1 | 50.00 |

Last updated: 17 August 2024
Source: Competitions

=== Süper Lig ===
==== League table ====
| Pos | Team | Pld | W | D | L | GF | GA | GD | Pts |
|---|---|---|---|---|---|---|---|---|---|
| 7 | Trabzonspor | 36 | 13 | 12 | 11 | 58 | 45 | +13 | 51 |
| 8 | Göztepe | 36 | 13 | 11 | 12 | 59 | 50 | +9 | 50 |
| 9 | Rizespor | 36 | 15 | 4 | 17 | 52 | 58 | −6 | 49 |
| 10 | Kasımpaşa | 36 | 11 | 14 | 11 | 62 | 63 | −1 | 47 |
| 11 | Konyaspor | 36 | 13 | 7 | 16 | 45 | 50 | −5 | 46 |

Source: Süper Lig
Rules for classification: 1) Points; 2) Head-to-head points; 3) Head-to-head goal difference; 4) Head-to-head goals scored; 5) Goal difference; 6) Goals scored; 7) Play-off.
(Note: Head-to-head record is used only after all the matches between the teams in question have been played)

==== Results summary ====
| Overall | | | | | | | | Home | | | | | | Away | | | | | |
| Pld | W | D | L | GF | GA | GD | Pts | W | D | L | GF | GA | GD | W | D | L | GF | GA | GD |
|---|---|---|---|---|---|---|---|---|---|---|---|---|---|---|---|---|---|---|---|
| 2 | 1 | 1 | 0 | 3 | 2 | +1 | 4 | 0 | 1 | 0 | 1 | 1 | 0 | 1 | 0 | 0 | 2 | 1 | +1 |

Last updated: 17 August 2024.
Source: Süper Lig

==== Results by round ====
| Round | 1 | 2 |
|---|---|---|
| Ground | H | A |
| Result | D | W |
| Position | 7 | |

Updated to match(es) played on 17 August 2024. Source: Süper Lig
A = Away; H = Home; W = Win; D = Draw; L = Loss

==== Matches ====
The match schedule was released on 11 July 2024.

| 12 August 2024 1 | Rizespor | 1–1 | Başakşehir | Rize |
| 21:00 | Aliqulov 45+6' | | Figueiredo 39' | Stadium: Rize City Stadium; Referee: Direnç Tonusluoğlu |

| 17 August 2024 2 | Adana Demirspor | 1–2 | Rizespor | Adana |
| 21:45 | Barası 90+8' (pen.) | | Aliqulov 41'; Sowe 74' | Stadium: New Adana Stadium |
