= Dal Varešanović =

Bosnian footballer (born 2001)

Personal information
- Date of birth: 23 May 2001 (age 25)
- Place of birth: Vienna, Austria
- Height: 1.77 m (5 ft 10 in)
- Position: Attacking midfielder

Team information
- Current team: Rizespor
- Number: 8

Youth career
- Sarajevo
- 2013–2016: Dinamo Zagreb
- 2016–2017: Sarajevo
- 2017–2020: Liverpool

Senior career*
Years	Team	Apps	(Gls)
2020–2023	Sarajevo	55	(13)
2023–	Rizespor	74	(13)
2025–2026	→ Gençlerbirliği (loan)	12	(0)

International career^{‡}
2017	Bosnia and Herzegovina U17	2	(0)
2019	Bosnia and Herzegovina U19	8	(2)
2023–	Bosnia and Herzegovina	2	(0)
- * Club domestic league appearances and goals as of 8 November 2026 ‡ National team caps and goals as of 19 November 2023

Dal Varešanović (pronounced [dâːl ʋareʃâːnoʋitɕ]; born 23 May 2001) is a professional footballer who plays as an attacking midfielder for Süper Lig club Rizespor. Born in Austria, he plays for the Bosnia and Herzegovina national team.

Varešanović started his professional career at Sarajevo, before joining Rizespor in 2023, who loaned him to Gençlerbirliği in 2025.

A former youth international for Bosnia and Herzegovina, Varešanović made his senior international debut in 2023.

== Club career ==
=== Sarajevo ===
Varešanović started playing football at Sarajevo, before joining the youth setup of Croatian team Dinamo Zagreb in 2013. In 2016, he returned to Sarajevo. The following year, he moved to the youth academy of English side Liverpool. In October 2020, he signed a four-year deal with Sarajevo. Varešanović made his professional debut against Krupa on 21 March 2021 at the age of 19 and managed to score a goal, which secured the victory for his squad. He won his first trophy with the club on 26 May, by beating Borac Banja Luka in the Bosnian Cup final.

In July 2022, he extended his contract with Sarajevo until June 2025.

=== Rizespor ===
In August 2023, Varešanović was transferred to Turkish outfit Rizespor for an undisclosed fee. He made his official debut for the team on 13 August against Adana Demirspor. On 1 September, he scored his first goal for Rizespor against Fatih Karagümrük.

In September 2025, he was sent on a season-long to Gençlerbirliği.

== International career ==
Varešanović represented Bosnia and Herzegovina at various youth levels.

In May 2023, he received his first senior call-up, for UEFA Euro 2024 qualifiers against Portugal and Luxembourg. He debuted against the former on 17 June.

== Personal life ==
Varešanović's father Mirza was also a professional footballer, as well as his grandfather Mirsad Fazlagić. His older brother Mak is also a professional footballer.

== Career statistics ==
=== Club ===
As of match played 8 November 2026

Appearances and goals by club, season and competition
Club	Season	League			National cup (Note: Includes Bosnian Cup, Turkish Cup)		Continental		Total	
Club	Season	Division	Apps	Goals	Apps	Goals	Apps	Goals	Apps	Goals
Sarajevo	2020–21	Bosnian Premier League	1	1	0	0	–		1	1
Sarajevo	2021–22	Bosnian Premier League	23	4	7	1	2 (Note: Appearances in UEFA Conference League)	0	32	5
Sarajevo	2022–23	Bosnian Premier League	30	8	1	0	–		31	8
Sarajevo	2023–24	Bosnian Premier League	1	0	0	0	2	1	3	1
Sarajevo	Total		55	13	8	1	4	1	67	15
Rizespor	2023–24	Süper Lig	33	9	2	1	–		35	10
Rizespor	2024–25	Süper Lig	32	3	5	3	–		37	6
Rizespor	2025–26	Süper Lig	2	1	0	0	–		2	1
Rizespor	2026–27	Süper Lig	7	0	0	0	–		7	0
Rizespor	Total		74	13	7	4	–		81	17
Gençlerbirliği (loan)	2025–26	Süper Lig	12	0	5	1	–		17	1
Career total			141	26	20	6	4	1	165	33

=== International ===
As of match played 19 November 2023

Appearances and goals by national team and year
National team	Year	Apps	Goals
Bosnia and Herzegovina
Bosnia and Herzegovina	2023	2	0
Total		2	0

== Honours ==
Sarajevo

- Bosnian Cup: 2020–21
