= Sakıp Özberk =

Turkish footballer and manager

Personal information
- Date of birth: 1 May 1945
- Place of birth: Gaziantep, Turkey
- Date of death: 15 August 2023 (aged 78)
- Place of death: Arsuz, Hatay, Turkey

Managerial career
- Years: Team
- 1987–1988: Siirtspor
- 1989–1990: Petrolofisi
- 1991–1992: Gaziantepspor
- 1992: Adana Demirspor
- 1993–1994: Zeytinburnuspor
- 1994–1997: Gaziantepspor
- 1997–1998: Altay
- 1999: Bursaspor
- 1999–2000: Gaziantepspor
- 2000: Siirtspor
- 2000–2001: Gaziantepspor
- 2001–2002: Denizlispor
- 2002–2003: Samsunspor
- 2003–2004: Diyarbakırspor
- 2004: Konyaspor
- 2004–2005: MKE Ankaragücü
- 2005: Çaykur Rizespor

Mehmet Sakıp Özberk (1 May 1945 – 15 August 2023) was a Turkish former footballer and manager. He played for Reyhanlıspor, Ankaragücü, Adana Demirspor and Gaziantepspor. He was technical director of Gaziantepspor. He lost his life after a heart attack during a swim in Arsuz, Hatay on 15 August 2023.
