= Alberk Koç =

Turkish footballer

Personal information
- Date of birth: 15 February 1997 (age 29)
- Place of birth: Konak, Turkey
- Height: 1.81 m (5 ft 11 in)
- Position: Left back

Team information
- Current team: Aliaga FK

Youth career
- 2006–2012: Menemenspor
- 2012–2015: Manisaspor

Senior career*
Years	Team	Apps	(Gls)
2015–2020	Menemenspor	79	(2)
2020–2023	Çaykur Rizespor	53	(1)
2022	→ Konyaspor (loan)	2	(0)
2024	Manisa	17	(0)
2024–2025	Amedspor	23	(0)
2026–	Aliaga FK	3	(1)
- * Club domestic league appearances and goals as of 10 February 2026

Alberk Koç (born 15 February 1997) is a Turkish professional footballer who plays for TFF 2. Lig club Aliaga FK as a left back.

== Professional career ==
Koç began his senior career with Menemenspor in the TFF First League, becoming their starting left-back. On 30 January 2020, signed a professional contract with Çaykur Rizespor. Koç made his professional debut with Çaykur Rizespor in a 3-2 Süper Lig win over Kayserispor on 9 July 2020.

On 13 November 2025, Koç was banned from playing for 45 days for his involvement in the 2025 Turkish football betting scandal. His contract with Amedspor was mutually terminated on the next day.
