= 2026–27 FCV Farul Constanța season =

FCV Farul Constanța
2026–27 season
- Manager: Ioan Sabău
- Superliga: Pre-season
- Cupa României: Pre-season

The 2026–27 season is the 107th season in the history of FC Farul Constanța and the club's sixth consecutive season in Liga I. They will also compete in the Cupa României.

== Transfers ==
=== In ===
Pos.	Player	Transferred from	Fee	Date	Source
FW	(France) Eddy Sylvestre	(France) USL Dunkerque	Undisclosed	1 July 2026	

=== Out ===
Pos.	Player	Transferred to	Fee	Date	Source
FW	(Romania) Jovan Marković	(Romania) Botoșani	Contract terminated	1 July 2026	
MF	(Portugal) Diogo Ramalho	(Indonesia) Persebaya Surabaya	Contract terminated	1 July 2026	

== Pre-season ==
27 June 2026 Friendly	Farul Constanța (Romania)	1–1	(Bulgaria) Fratria
17:30	49'		1'

3 July 2026 Friendly	Farul Constanța (Romania)	0–0	(Romania) Oțelul Galați
16:00

8 July 2026 Friendly	Farul Constanța (Romania)	0–1	(Bulgaria) Cherno More
16:00

11 July 2026 Friendly	Voluntari (Romania)	3–0	(Romania) Farul Constanța
10:30

11 July 2026 Friendly	Dinamo București (Romania)	1–3	(Romania) Farul Constanța
19:30

== Competitions ==
=== Superliga ===
Pos	Team	Pld	W	D	L	GF	GA	GD	Pts	Qualification
7	Csíkszereda Miercurea Ciuc	0	0	0	0	0	0	0	0	Advances to Play-out
8	Dinamo București	0	0	0	0	0	0	0	0	Advances to Play-out
9	Farul Constanța	0	0	0	0	0	0	0	0	Advances to Play-out
10	Petrolul Ploiești	0	0	0	0	0	0	0	0	Advances to Play-out
11	Rapid București	0	0	0	0	0	0	0	0	Advances to Play-out

Source: LPF (in Romanian)
Rules for classification: 1) Points; 2) Head-to-head points; 3) Head-to-head goal difference; 4) Head-to-head goals scored; 5) Goal difference; 6) Goals scored; 7) Play-off.

==== Results by round ====
Round	1
Ground	A
Result	L
Position	

A = Away; H = Home; W = Win; D = Draw; L = Loss

==== Matches ====
19 July 2026 1	Universitatea Cluj	2–1	Farul Constanța	Cluj-Napoca
17:00	Aliev 43'; Drammeh 49'		Doicaru 54'
