= Nedim Günar =

Turkish footballer

Personal information
- Date of birth: 2 January 1932
- Place of birth: Balıkesir, Turkey
- Date of death: 7 September 2011 (aged 79)
- Place of death: Istanbul, Turkey
- Height: 1.67 m (5 ft 6 in)
- Position: Defender

Senior career*
| Years | Team | Apps | (Gls) |
| 1948–1961 | Fenerbahçe S.K. | | |
| 1961–1962 | Vefa S.K. | | |
| 1962–1963 | Fenerbahçe | | |

International career
- Turkey
- * Club domestic league appearances and goals

Nedim Günar (2 January 1932 - 7 September 2011) was a Turkish football defender who played for Turkey in the 1954 FIFA World Cup. He also played for Fenerbahçe S.K.

Karacaahmet Mezarligi Nedim Gunar
