= Taha Şahin =

Turkish footballer (born 2000)

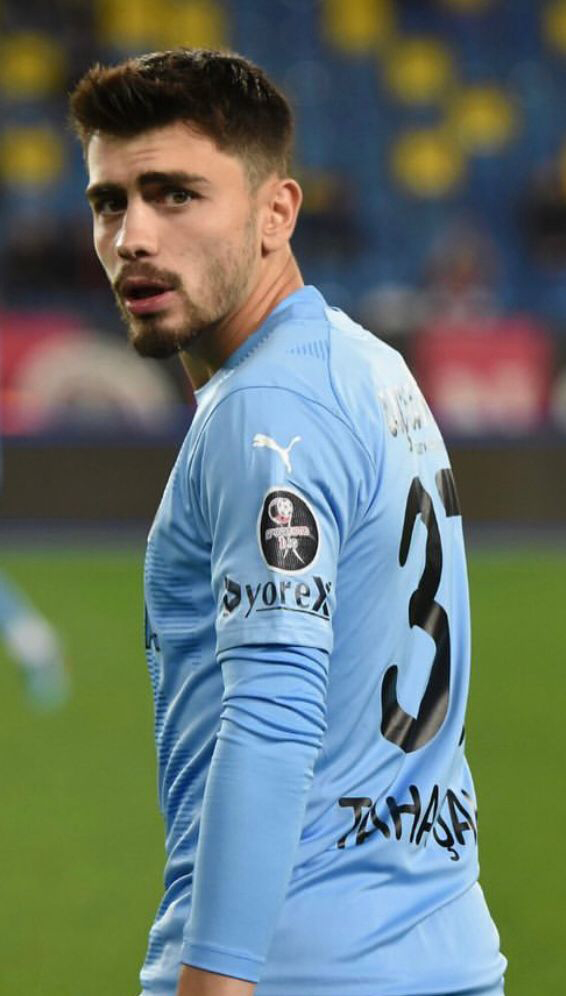
- Şahin in 2023

Personal information
- Full name: Muhammet Taha Şahin
- Date of birth: 22 October 2000 (age 26)
- Place of birth: Üsküdar, Turkey
- Height: 1.78 m (5 ft 10 in)
- Position: Right-back

Team information
- Current team: Çaykur Rizespor
- Number: 37

Youth career
- 2012–2013: Fenerbahçe
- 2013–2019: Kasımpaşa

Senior career*
Years	Team	Apps	(Gls)
2019–2021	68 Aksaray Belediyespor	43	(3)
2021–2023	Manisa	50	(2)
2021	→ 68 Aksaray Belediyespor (loan)	15	(1)
2023–	Çaykur Rizespor	97	(1)

International career
2022	Turkey U23	4	(0)
Medal record
Men's football
Representing Turkey
Islamic Solidarity Games
Gold medal – first place	2021
- * Club domestic league appearances and goals as of 10 June 2026

Muhammet Taha Şahin (born 22 October 2000) is a Turkish professional footballer who plays as a right-back for Süper Lig club Çaykur Rizespor.

== Club career ==
Şahin is a youth product of Fenerbahçe and Kasımpaşa. On 1 August 2019, he moved to 68 Aksaray Belediyespor in the TFF Third League, where he began his senior career. On 20 January 2021, he moved to the TFF First League club Manisa on a 3.5-year contract, returning on loan to 68 Aksaray Belediyespor for the remainder of the 2020–21 season. He spent two seasons with Manisa, making 50 appearances and scoring 2 goals. On 26 July 2023, he transferred to the Süper Lig club Çaykur Rizespor.

== International career ==
Şahin represented the Turkey U23s in their winning campaign at the 2021 Islamic Solidarity Games.

On 14 March 2025, Şahin was called up by Vincenzo Montella to the Turkey national team for the 2024–25 UEFA Nations League promotion/relegation play-offs against Hungary.

== Honours ==
Turkey U23

- Islamic Solidarity Games: 2021
