= Radu Doicaru =

Romanian footballer (born 1979)

Personal information
- Date of birth: 26 February 1979 (age 47)
- Place of birth: Mangalia, Romania
- Height: 1.81 m (5 ft 11 1/2 in)
- Position: Striker

Senior career*
Years	Team	Apps	(Gls)
1998–2001	Callatis Mangalia	37	(3)
2003–2005	Farul Constanța	26	(2)
2005–2010	Ceahlăul Piatra Neamţ	85	(21)
2010	Farul Constanța	0	(0)
2011–2015	Callatis Mangalia	16+	(9)
Total		154+	(35)

Managerial career
- 2016–: Mangalia Football School (youth)
- * Club domestic league appearances and goals as of 25 February 2018

Radu Doicaru (born 26 February 1979) is a Romanian former football player who currently is a manager at youth level.

== Personal life ==
His son, Iustin, was also a professional footballer.
