= Seyfettin Anıl Yaşar =

Turkish footballer

Personal information
- Date of birth: 1 July 2002 (age 24)
- Place of birth: Osmangazi, Turkey
- Height: 1.92 m (6 ft 4 in)
- Position: Centre back

Team information
- Current team: Eyüpspor (on loan from Çaykur Rizespor)
- Number: 4

Youth career
- 2013–2015: Bursaspor
- 2015–2016: Yeşil Bursa
- 2016–2017: TSE Arabayatağıspor
- 2017–2018: Fethiye İdmanyurdu
- 2018–2020: Afyonspor

Senior career*
| Years | Team | Apps | (Gls) |
| 2020–2021 | Afyonspor | 21 | (0) |
| 2021– | Çaykur Rizespor | 36 | (0) |
| 2022 | → Menemenspor (loan) | 11 | (0) |
| 2025 | → Esenler Erokspor (loan) | 15 | (1) |
| 2025–2026 | → Esenler Erokspor (loan) | 7 | (0) |
| 2026– | → Eyüpspor (loan) | 10 | (0) |

International career^{‡}
| 2024 | Türkiye U21 | 2 | (0) |
- * Club domestic league appearances and goals as of 17 October 2026 ‡ National team caps and goals as of 22:15, 11 October 2024 (UTC)

Seyfettin Anıl Yaşar (born 1 July 2002) is a Turkish professional footballer who plays as a centre back for Turkish Süper Lig club Eyüpspor on loan from Çaykur Rizespor.

== Career ==
Yaşar is a youth product of Bursaspor, Yeşil Bursa, TSE Arabayatağıspor, and Fethiye İdmanyurdu before moving to Afyonspor in 2018 where he signed his first professional contract. He began his senior career with Afyonspor in the TFF Second League in 2020. On 16 July 2021, he transferred to the Süper Lig club Çaykur Rizespor on a 4-year contract. On 28 January 2022, he joined Menemenspor on loan for the second half of the 2021–22 season in the TFF First League.

== International career ==
Yaşar was called up to the Turkey U18s in February 2021. In May 2021, he was called up to the Turkey U21s.
