= Mithat Pala =

Turkish footballer

Personal information
- Date of birth: 15 August 2000 (age 26)
- Place of birth: Adapazarı, Turkey
- Height: 1.72 m (5 ft 8 in)
- Position: Central midfielder

Team information
- Current team: Çaykur Rizespor
- Number: 54

Youth career
- 2012–2016: Yıldırımspor
- 2016–2019: Sakarya Demirspor

Senior career*
Years	Team	Apps	(Gls)
2019–2020	Pazarspor	13	(3)
2020–	Çaykur Rizespor	125	(4)
2020	→ Pazarspor (loan)	13	(1)
2021–2022	→ Afjet Afyonspor (loan)	35	(8)
- * Club domestic league appearances and goals as of 10 June 2026

Mithat Pala (born 15 August 2000) is a Turkish professional footballer who plays as a central midfielder for Süper Lig club Çaykur Rizespor.

== Career ==
Pala began his career at Pazarspor, and transferred to Çaykur Rizespor in January 2020, returning to Pazarspor on loan for the remainder of the 2019–20 season. Pala made his professional debut with Çaykur Rizespor in a 1–0 Turkish Cup loss to Beşiktaş, on 13 January 2021.
