= Mirza Varešanović =

Bosnian football manager (born 1972)

Personal information
- Date of birth: 31 May 1972 (age 54)
- Place of birth: Sarajevo, SFR Yugoslavia
- Height: 1.86 m (6 ft 1 in)
- Position: Defender

Youth career
- –1991: Sarajevo

Senior career*
Years	Team	Apps	(Gls)
1991–1995	Sarajevo	14	(1)
1995–1996	Bordeaux	13	(0)
1996–1998	Olympiacos	67	(2)
1998–2000	Bursaspor	54	(2)
2000–2001	Austria Wien	19	(0)
2001–2002	Sarajevo	16	(1)
2002–2003	Bursaspor	22	(1)
2003–2004	Sarajevo	11	(0)
Total		216	(7)

International career
1996–2001	Bosnia and Herzegovina	24	(0)

Managerial career
- 2010–2011: Sarajevo
- 2011–2012: Velež Mostar
- 2014–2015: Olimpik
- 2017: Olimpik
- 2018: Bosnia and Herzegovina U18
- 2019: Tuzla City
- 2022–2023: Sarajevo
- * Club domestic league appearances and goals

Mirza Varešanović (born 31 May 1972) is a Bosnian professional football manager and former player.

During his playing career, which spanned nearly 15 years, he competed in Bosnia and Herzegovina, France, Greece, Turkey and Austria, playing in France for Bordeaux and in Greece for Olympiacos among others. He was the first Bosnian to play in France. Varešanović also played for the Bosnia and Herzegovina national team in the late 1990s and early 2000s.

In 2010, he started working as a manager. During his managerial career, Varešanović managed hometown club Sarajevo on two occasions, Velež Mostar, Olimpik, the Bosnia and Herzegovina U18 national team and Tuzla City.

== Club career ==
Varešanović started his career with hometown club Sarajevo, breaking into the first team in 1991, but getting only limited playing time. With the start of the Bosnian War, competitive football in the country halted and Sarajevo became a touring club. During one of these tours, Varešanović was spotted by Bordeaux scouts, and he quickly joined the French team.

A year later he made a move to Olympiacos, spending two seasons with the Greek outfit. With Olympiacos, he won the Super League Greece in the seasons 1996–97 and 1997–98. He next moved to Turkish Süper Lig side Bursaspor, who he would go on to represent on two separate occasions.

In 2002 while back at Sarajevo, Varešanović won the 2001–02 Bosnian Cup. He concluded his playing career with Sarajevo in 2004.

== International career ==
Varešanović made his debut for Bosnia and Herzegovina in an April 1996 friendly game against Albania and has earned a total of 24 caps, scoring no goals. He played in the UEFA Euro 2000 and the 1998 and 2002 FIFA World Cup qualifying campaigns. His final international was a July 2001 friendly against Iran.

== Managerial career ==
=== Early career ===
After concluding his playing career, Varešanović was named Sarajevo sporting director, and held the position for two years. In 2010, he was named Sarajevo manager and led the team for one season and finished second in the 2010–11 Bosnian Premier League season.

In the summer of 2011, he was approached by Velež Mostar, and went on to lead the Herzegovina outfit for also one season.

=== Olimpik ===
On 5 May 2014, Varešanović accepted an offer from Olimpik. In his second season, he won the Bosnian Cup trophy and made historic achievement with Olimpik by winning the first trophy for the youngest football club in the Bosnian Premier League.

Varešanović left the club on 21 November 2015.

=== Return to Olimpik ===
Varešanović once again came back to Olimpik in June 2017, but again left the club the very same year in November.

=== Bosnia and Herzegovina U18 ===
In 2018, Varešanović became the head coach of the Bosnia and Herzegovina U18 national team. He led the national team to 8th place at the 2018 Mediterranean Games in Tarragona, Spain.

=== Tuzla City ===
On 26 February 2019, Varešanović signed a half-a-year contract with Bosnian Premier League club Tuzla City. His first win as Tuzla City's manager came on 9 March 2019, in 2–0 away win against Krupa.

On 25 May 2019, after the end of the last game of the 2018–19 Bosnian Premier League season in which Tuzla City lost against Željezničar at home 3–0, Varešanović decided to leave Tuzla, stating "I've been here for about three months, we have achieved what we had planned, but I will not be the manager of the club next season. I'm just too tired for this time, and some other things have also happened which have added to the decision of my departure." He officially left the club a day later on 26 May.

=== Return to Sarajevo ===
On 12 December 2022, Sarajevo appointed Varešanović as manager for the second time. He suffered defeat in his first match back in charge, losing 2–0 to Zrinjski Mostar on 26 February 2023.

On 5 March 2023, Varešanović earned his first victory since his return as manager in an away game against Široki Brijeg. He finished the season with the side in 4th place, qualifying for the 2023–24 UEFA Europa Conference League first qualifying round.

On 20 July 2023, Sarajevo got eliminated from the 2023–24 UEFA Europa Conference League in the first qualifying round by Georgian club Torpedo Kutaisi, following a penalty shoot-out. On 22 July, it was announced by Sarajevo that Varešanović had left the club by mutual consent, after the team's disappointing European campaign.

== Personal life ==
Varešanović's son Mak is also a professional footballer who had signed for Serie A club Udinese, but without any played match. His younger son, Dal, currently plays in the Bosnian Premier League for Sarajevo. His father-in-law is fellow footballer Mirsad Fazlagić.

== Managerial statistics ==
As of match played 20 July 2023

Managerial record by team and tenure
Team	From	To	Record							
Team	From	To	G	W	D	L	GF	GA	GD	Win %
Sarajevo	7 April 2010	20 June 2011	44	24	11	9	79	37	+42	54.55
Velež Mostar	6 July 2011	18 April 2012	22	6	8	8	20	23	−3	27.27
Olimpik	5 May 2014	21 November 2015	58	22	16	20	83	75	+8	37.93
Olimpik	8 June 2017	23 November 2017	18	11	4	3	26	11	+15	61.11
Bosnia and Herzegovina U18	2018	June 2018	3	0	0	3	3	8	−5	0.00
Tuzla City	26 February 2019	26 May 2019	13	4	4	5	14	17	−3	30.77
Sarajevo	12 December 2022	22 July 2023	17	8	4	5	31	24	+7	47.06
Total			175	75	47	53	256	195	+61	42.86

== Honours ==
=== Player ===
Bordeaux

- UEFA Intertoto Cup: 1995 (Joint Winner)

Olympiacos

- Super League Greece: 1996–97, 1997–98

Sarajevo

- Bosnian Cup: 2001–02

=== Manager ===
Olimpik

- Bosnian Cup: 2014–15
