= Siaka Bakayoko =

French footballer (born 2005)

Personal information
- Date of birth: 26 May 2005 (age 21)
- Place of birth: Abidjan, Ivory Coast
- Height: 1.88 m (6 ft 2 in)
- Position: Centre-back

Team information
- Current team: Çaykur Rizespor

Youth career
- 2011–2016: Aubervilliers
- 2016–2020: Red Star FC
- 2020–2022: Amiens

Senior career*
Years	Team	Apps	(Gls)
2022–2023	Amiens II	16	(0)
2023–2026	Amiens	56	(3)
2026–	Çaykur Rizespor	0	(0)

International career^{‡}
2021–2022	France U17	3	(0)
- * Club domestic league appearances and goals as of 12 May 2026 ‡ National team caps and goals as of 19:20, 11 August 2025 (UTC)

Siaka Bakayoko (born 26 May 2005) is a professional football player who plays as a centre-back for Turkish Süper Lig club Çaykur Rizespor. Born in the Ivory Coast, he is a youth international for France.

== Career ==
Bakayoko is a product of the youth academies of Aubervilliers, Red Star FC and Amiens, and debuted with Amiens' reserves in 2022. He made his professional debut with the senior Amiens side in a 3–0 Coupe de France win over SSEP Hombourg-Haut on 18 November 2023. On 5 July 2024, Bakayoko signed his first professional contract with Amiens until 2027.

On 25 June 2026, Bakayoko signed a three-season contract with Çaykur Rizespor in Turkey.

== International career ==
Born in the Ivory Coast, Bakayoko moved to France at a young age and holds dual-citizenship. He was called up to the France U17s for a set of friendlies in December 2021.
