= Mak Varešanović =

Bosnian footballer

Personal information
- Date of birth: 28 August 1998 (age 28)
- Place of birth: Bursa, Turkey
- Height: 1.88 m (6 ft 2 in)
- Position: Midfielder

Team information
- Current team: Folgore Caratese
- Number: 8

Youth career
- 2008–2015: Sarajevo
- 2016: Udinese

Senior career*
Years	Team	Apps	(Gls)
2015–2016	Olimpik	14	(1)
2017–2019	Udinese	0	(0)
2019–2021	Casertana	39	(0)
2021	Koper	10	(0)
2023	Sloboda Tuzla	5	(0)
2024	Triglav Kranj	10	(1)
2024–	Folgore Caratese	11	(2)

International career
2015	Bosnia and Herzegovina U17	4	(0)
2016	Bosnia and Herzegovina U19	2	(0)
2017	Bosnia and Herzegovina U21	1	(0)
- * Club domestic league appearances and goals as of 17 November 2024

Mak Varešanović (born 28 August 1998) is a Bosnian professional footballer who plays as a midfielder for Italian Serie D club Folgore Caratese.

== Club career ==
Before joining Casertana, Varešanović played for Serie A club Udinese.

On 7 July 2021, he signed a two-year contract with Slovenian club Koper.

== Personal life ==
Varešanović comes from a footballing family. His father, Mirza Varešanović, earned over 20 caps for Bosnia and Herzegovina. His grandfather Mirsad Fazlagić captained Yugoslavia at UEFA Euro 1968, while his brother Dal plays professionally for Bosnian Premier League club Sarajevo.

== Honours ==
Olimpik

- Bosnian Cup: 2014–15
