= Iustin Doicaru =

Romanian footballer (born 2007)

Personal information
- Full name: Albert Iustin Doicaru
- Date of birth: 7 February 2007 (age 19)
- Place of birth: Mangalia, Romania
- Height: 1.80 m (5 ft 11 in)
- Position: Right winger

Team information
- Current team: Çaykur Rizespor
- Number: 53

Youth career
- 2018–2026: Gheorghe Hagi Academy

Senior career*
Years	Team	Apps	(Gls)
2023–2026	Farul Constanța	40	(4)
2026–	Rizespor	4	(1)

International career^{‡}
2022–2023	Romania U16	13	(5)
2023–2024	Romania U17	11	(3)
2025	Romania U18	2	(1)
2024–2026	Romania U19	6	(0)
2026–	Romania U21	2	(0)
- * Club domestic league appearances and goals as of 20 September 2026 ‡ National team caps and goals as of 30 September 2026

Albert Iustin Doicaru (born 7 February 2007) is a Romanian professional footballer who plays as a right winger for Süper Lig club Çaykur Rizespor.

== Club career ==
=== Farul Constanta ===
He made his league debut on 26 October 2023 in Liga I match against UTA Arad.

== Personal life ==
His father, Radu, was also a professional footballer.

== Career statistics ==
As of match played 20 September 2026

Appearances and goals by club, season and competition
Club	Season	League			National cup (Note: Includes Cupa României)		Europe		Other		Total	
Club	Season	Division	Apps	Goals	Apps	Goals	Apps	Goals	Apps	Goals	Apps	Goals
Farul Constanța	2023–24	Liga I	2	0	2	0	—		0	0	4	0
Farul Constanța	2024–25	Liga I	24	0	3	1	—		—		27	1
Farul Constanța	2025–26	Liga I	8	1	2	1	—		1 (Note: Appearances in Liga I promotion/relegation play-offs)	0	11	2
Farul Constanța	2026–27	Liga I	6	3	—		—		—		6	3
Farul Constanța	Total		40	4	7	2	—		1	0	48	6
Çaykur Rizespor	2026–27	Süper Lig	4	1	0	0	—		—		4	1
Career total			44	5	7	2	0	0	1	0	52	7
