= Eyüpspor =

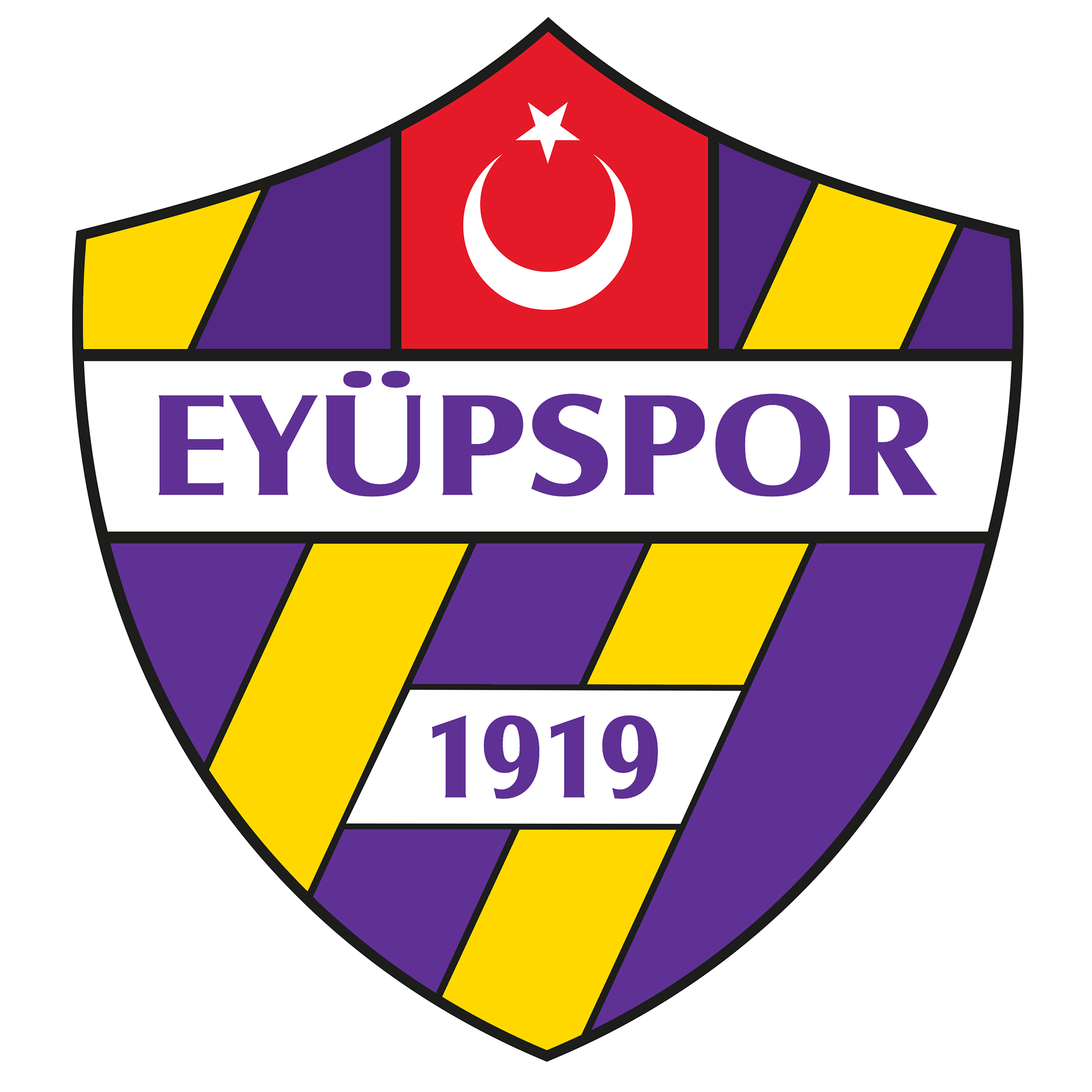
- Full name: Eyüpspor Kulübü
- Founded: 1919; 107 years ago
- Stadium: Esenyurt Necmi Kadıoğlu Stadium
- Capacity: 4,274
- Coordinates: 41°01′58″N 28°58′21″E
- President: Yusuf Öksüzömer
- Head coach: Mustafa Dalcı
- League: Süper Lig
- 2025–26: Süper Lig, 15th of 18
Home colours	Away colours

Eyüpspor Kulübü (for sponsorship reasons ikas Eyüpspor) is a Turkish professional football club based in the Eyüpsultan district of Istanbul. Founded in 1919, the club is closely associated with the Golden Horn (Haliç) and plays in Süper Lig, the top tier of Turkish football.

Eyüpspor's traditional colours are purple and yellow (eflatun–sarı). Their long-time home is the Eyüp Stadium; following promotion, the team has staged home fixtures at Recep Tayyip Erdoğan Stadium and later at Pendik Stadium while a new/redeveloped venue in Eyüpsultan is pursued to meet modern match-day requirements.

Eyüpspor won the TFF First League in 2023–24 to reach the Süper Lig for the first time, having previously claimed the TFF Second League (2020–21) and two TFF Third League titles (1986–87, 2014–15). The club is widely regarded as a neighbourhood side with a strong local following; notable city rivalries include the “Haliç Derby” against Kasımpaşa S.K., as well as meetings with Fatih Karagümrük and Beykoz 1908.

Eyüpspor's recent rise has been overseen by chairman Murat Özkaya and, following promotion under Arda Turan, the team has been also coached by former international Selçuk Şahin.

Murat Özkaya, who is also a Galatasaray Sports Club congress member, has been arrested for match fixing allegations regarding the 2025 Turkish football betting scandal. Since then the club has been owned by Savings Deposit Insurance Fund of Turkey (TMSF).

== History ==
Founded in 1919 in Istanbul's Eyüpsultan district, Eyüpspor have long been identified as a “Golden Horn” (’‘Haliç’’) neighbourhood club, wearing the traditional purple-and-yellow (’‘eflatun–sarı’’) colours. In the inter-war years the club took part in the Istanbul regional competitions and appeared in the Istanbul Football League between 1935 and 1938; contemporary fixture records list several Eyüpspor matches from those seasons.

Eyüpspor entered the national pyramid in the 1970–71 season with promotion to the Third League, but dropped back to the Regional Amateur level two years later. Regaining momentum in the mid-1980s, the club won their group in the Third League in 1986–87 and moved up to the Second League. After a difficult spell in 1993–94 they slipped back into the Third League, but returned again in the early 2000s with another quick climb.

A modern turning point came in 2019 when businessman Murat Özkaya was elected club president. Özkaya has publicly outlined a plan to professionalise operations, eliminate legacy debts and re-establish the club as a model neighbourhood team with sustainable finances.

Under the revamped structure the team dominated the 2020–21 season, winning the TFF 2. Lig with a record points haul and lifting the championship trophy to return to the second tier. In 2021–22 Eyüpspor reached the 1. Lig play-offs but were eliminated by Bandırmaspor over two legs in the semi-finals (1–0, 0–3).

In April 2023 the club appointed former international Arda Turan as head coach to lead a promotion push. Building a squad with top-flight experience, Eyüpspor added high-profile names such as Ryan Babel (free agent after Galatasaray), Ömer Bayram (agreement after Galatasaray exit), Caner Erkin (veteran left-back returning to Istanbul), and later Belgian striker Gianni Bruno.

The 2023–24 campaign proved decisive. On 7 April 2024 Eyüpspor sealed a first-ever Süper Lig promotion by beating Altay 4–1 in Istanbul, a match in which Gianni Bruno scored twice with five rounds left to play; the following week they clinched the 1. Lig title, finishing the season with a 4–0 away win at Erzurumspor FK. Eyüpspor enter the top flight as the seventh Istanbul representative in 2024–25, positioning themselves as a community-rooted club with top-flight ambitions under the current board led by Murat Özkaya and technical staff headed by Arda Turan.

The 2024–25 season marked Eyüpspor's debut in the Süper Lig. In a remarkable first campaign, they secured top-flight survival and finished 6th—surpassing expectations with emphatic home victories over Beşiktaş and Galatasaray and a dramatic late-season win against Trabzonspor.

In May 2025, Arda Turan departed to accept the managerial role at Shakhtar Donetsk. He was succeeded at Eyüpspor by former international teammate Selçuk Şahin, under whose leadership the club continues to aim for stability and sustained Süper Lig status.

== Stadium ==
Eyüpspor's traditional home is the Eyüp Stadyumu in the Eyüpsultan district of Istanbul. The ground, long used for the club's league matches, underwent lighting and compliance upgrades in recent seasons; further works and a complete redevelopment have been planned to bring the venue up to modern standards. In 2024 the municipality and club publicly confirmed a new stadium project targeting a 10–12,000 capacity all-seater to UEFA-TFF criteria, with preliminary tendering and design steps announced.

Because Eyüp Stadyumu did not yet meet all top-flight match-day and broadcast requirements at the time of promotion, the club announced it would host its 2024–25 Süper Lig home fixtures at Recep Tayyip Erdoğan Stadium (Kasımpaşa).

With redevelopment and fixture logistics still ongoing the following year, the club later stated it would stage home matches at Pendik Stadium for a period, after TFF did not approve an alternative request.

The club and local authorities continue to pursue the new Eyüp Stadyumu project, envisaged as a modern, community-centric home that meets UEFA-TFF standards while keeping the team inside its historic neighbourhood.

== Crest and colours ==
Eyüpspor have been associated with the purple–yellow (eflatun–sarı) palette since their early decades, an identity the Turkish press often links to the club's Golden Horn (Haliç) roots and neighbourhood tradition. The colour pairing is also used by the TFF in the club's official record, where Eyüpspor are listed with their purple–yellow visual identity and badge.

The current crest is a purple-and-yellow shield that carries the inscription “Eyüpspor” together with the founding year “1919”. It has been retained through recent kit cycles and branding updates, with only minor graphic refinements to typography and shield proportions.

Traditionally, the home strip combines the two club colours prominently (alternating or blocked purple–yellow elements), while change kits have varied between white, all-purple or all-yellow according to supplier templates for a given season.

== Rivalries ==
Eyüpspor's most notable rivalries are with fellow Istanbul-based sides Kasımpaşa, Fatih Karagümrük and Beykoz 1908. These rivalries stem from close geographical proximity, overlapping supporter territories and long histories of competitive encounters in the Istanbul regional leagues and lower divisions of Turkish football.

Matches against Kasımpaşa are often described as the “Golden Horn derby” due to the clubs’ locations on opposite sides of the Haliç, with games frequently drawing large crowds and heightened security presence. Meetings with Fatih Karagümrük, another historic inner-city club, are similarly intense, fuelled by decades of competition in the TFF First League and cup fixtures, and occasionally marred by crowd disturbances.

The rivalry with Beykoz 1908 is rooted in the amateur and semi-professional eras, when the two sides frequently contested promotion spots in the old Istanbul leagues. While they have met less often in recent years, historical tensions among older supporter groups remain part of the club's identity.

In all three rivalries, local pride and territorial identity play a key role, with fixtures sometimes requiring significant police deployment due to the potential for confrontations between fan groups.

== Players ==
=== Current squad ===
As of 27 August 2026

Note: Flags indicate national team as defined under FIFA eligibility rules; some limited exceptions apply. Players may hold more than one non-FIFA nationality.

No.	Pos.	Nation	Player
1	GK	TUR	Emre Bilgin
3	DF	TUR	Arda Yavuz
4	DF	TUR	Anıl Yaşar (on loan from Çaykur Rizespor)
5	DF	MAR	Jawad El Yamiq
7	DF	TUR	Talha Ülvan (captain)
8	MF	CPV	David Costa
9	FW	TUR	Yusuf Barası (on loan from Kasımpaşa)
10	MF	MAR	Abdelhamid Sabiri
11	FW	FRA	Lenny Pintor
15	MF	FRA	Charles-André Raux-Yao
18	MF	TUR	Hamza Akman
21	DF	ITA	Simone Giordano
25	FW	SEN	Abdou Khadre Sy
27	DF	TUR	Yiğit Demir

No.	Pos.	Nation	Player
28	MF	TUR	Taşkın İlter
29	FW	NGR	Ahmed Abdullahi
31	GK	ROU	Horațiu Moldovan (on loan from Atlético Madrid)
33	DF	SCO	Zak Jules
42	DF	TUR	Berhan Şatlı
44	DF	TUR	Ömer Ceyhan
53	FW	TUR	Musa Eren Karakaş
70	MF	TUR	Mete Demir
77	MF	POL	Konrad Michalak
84	FW	CIV	Christ Sadia
88	MF	CGO	Chandrel Massanga
98	FW	FRA	Bilal Boutobba
99	GK	TUR	Umut Keseci
—	DF	SEN	Diabel Ndoye

=== Out on loan ===
Note: Flags indicate national team as defined under FIFA eligibility rules; some limited exceptions apply. Players may hold more than one non-FIFA nationality.

No.	Pos.	Nation	Player
—	MF	TUR	Erdem Çalık (at Fatsa Belediyespor until 30 June 2027)
—	FW	GHA	Prince Ampem (at Shanghai Port until 31 December 2026)

No.	Pos.	Nation	Player
—	FW	TUR	Berkay Kumlu (at Malatya Yeşilyurtspor until 30 June 2027)

== Coaching staff ==
Position	Name
Head coach	(Turkey) Atila Gerin
Assistant coach	(Turkey) Uğur Akdemir
Assistant coach	(Turkey) Umut Eskiköy
Assistant coach	(Turkey) Barış Kanbak
Assistant coach	(Turkey) Volkan Arslan
Goalkeeping coach	(Turkey) Erdinç Kurt
Athletic coach	(Guinea-Bissau) Anex Pereira
Athletic coach	(Greece) Pantelis Pantelopoulos
Performance and Analysis coach	(Turkey) Doğukan Başcan

== Achievements ==
=== Honours ===
- 1. Lig (second tier)
  - Champions: 2023–24
- 2. Lig (third tier)
  - Champions: 2020–21
- 3. Lig (fourth tier)
  - Champions: 1986–87, 2014–15

=== League participation ===
- Süper Lig: 2024–
- 1. Lig: 1982–83, 1987–94, 2021–2024
- 2. Lig: 1970–73, 1984–87, 1994–01, 2002–14, 2015–21
- 3. Lig: 2001–02, 2014–15
- Amateur League: 1959–70, 1973–82, 1983–84
