= Rize City Stadium =

Football stadium in Rize, Turkey

Coordinates: 41.04202°N 40.5733°E

Çaykur Didi Stadium
- Atmaca Arena
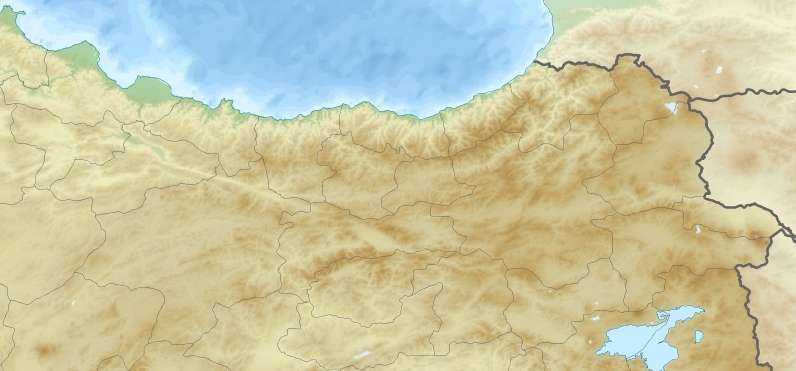
- Location in Northeastern Turkey Location in Turkey
- Full name: Çaykur Didi Stadyumu
- Location: Rize, Turkey
- Capacity: 14.879
- Executive suites: 12

Construction
- Groundbreaking: 13 December 2007
- Opened: 24 August 2009

Tenants
- Çaykur Rizespor (2009–present); Turkey national football team (selected matches)

The Rize City Stadium, known for sponsorship reasons as the Çaykur Didi Stadium, is a multi-use stadium in Rize, Turkey. It is currently used mostly for football matches and is the home ground of Çaykur Rizespor. The stadium has a capacity of 14.879 spectators and it opened in 2009. It replaced Rize Atatürk Stadium as the home of Çaykur Rizespor.

== Matches ==
=== Turkish national team ===
Rize City Stadium is one of the home stadiums of the Turkey national football team

Date	Time (TRT)	Team #1	Res.	Team #2	Round	Attendance
11 October 2018	20:30	Turkey	0–0	Bosnia and Herzegovina	Friendly	15,200
