= Ibrahim Olawoyin =

Nigerian footballer (born 1997)

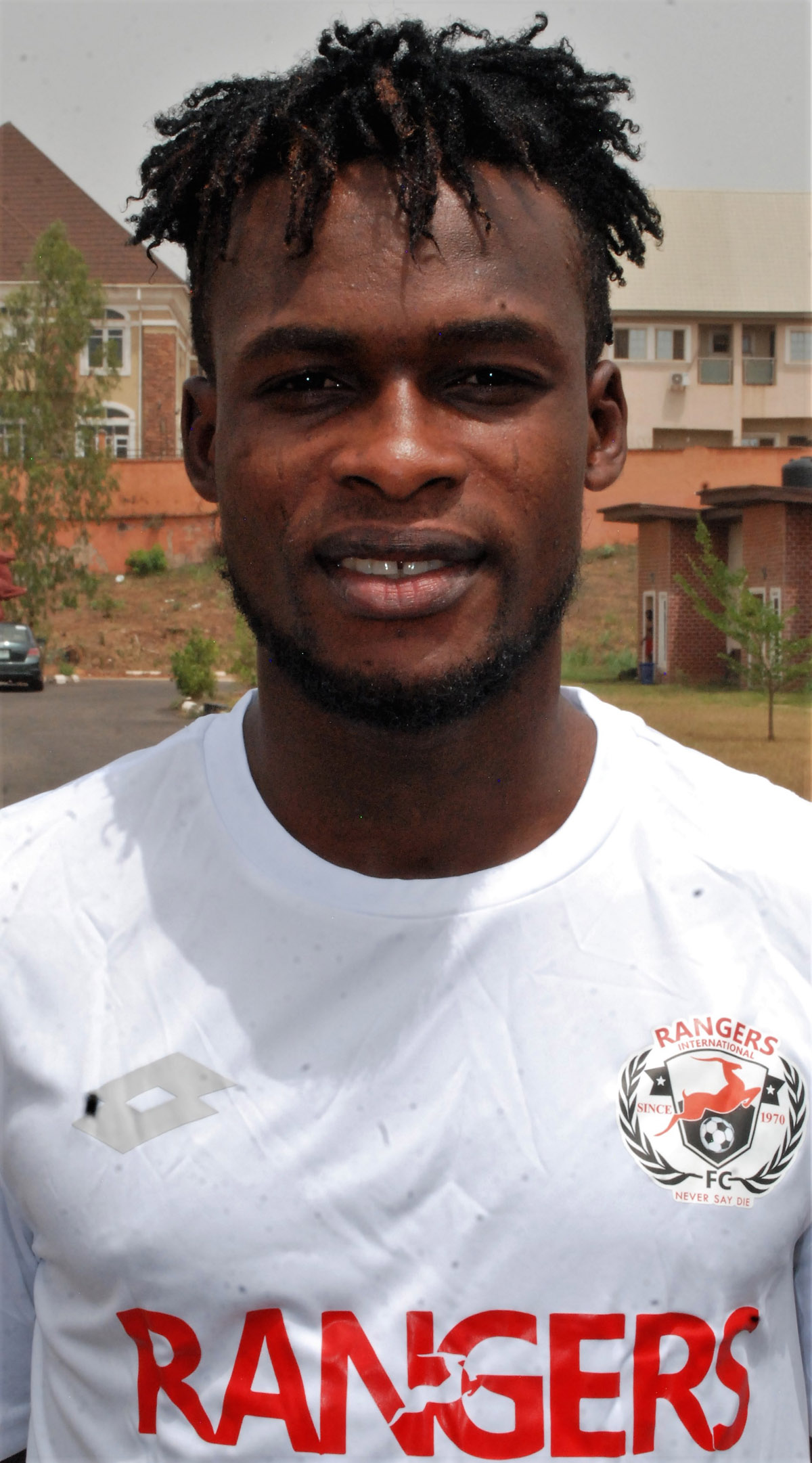

Personal information
- Full name: Olasunkanmi Ibrahim Olawoyin
- Date of birth: 1 December 1997 (age 28)
- Place of birth: Lagos, Nigeria
- Height: 1.78 m (5 ft 10 in)
- Position: Winger

Team information
- Current team: Çaykur Rizespor
- Number: 10

Senior career*
Years	Team	Apps	(Gls)
2017–2018	Abia Comets	40	(7)
2019	Abia Warriors	21	(5)
2019–2021	Rangers International	43	(10)
2021–2023	Ankara Keçiörengücü	50	(12)
2023–	Çaykur Rizespor	112	(18)

International career^{‡}
2019–	Nigeria	2	(0)
- * Club domestic league appearances and goals as of 10 June 2026 ‡ National team caps and goals as of 10 June 2024

Olasunkanmi Ibrahim Olawoyin (born 1 December 1997) is a Nigerian professional footballer who plays as a winger for Süper Lig club Çaykur Rizespor.

== Club career ==
Olawoyin played his first-ever game in the Nigerian Professional Football League on 13 January 2019 for his former side Abia Warriors. They lost 1–0 at Nasarawa United. He went ahead to start twenty-one out of the twenty-two games in that season's abridged league. Olawoyin scored three goals for Warriors in the league that season; against Yobe Desert Stars, Ifeanyi Ubah and Heartland, contributing up to ten assists in the league. Olawoyin's consistency attracted interests from Lobi Stars and Rangers International but the winger opted to join the latter. He made his competitive debut in Rangers' 2–1 loss to AS Pelican of Gabon in a CAF Confederation Cup game in Gaborone. He played for 75 minutes in the game. He made his home debut in the return leg, scoring the decisive third goal which qualified Rangers for the next round.

After making over 40 appearances in all competitions for Rangers International, Olawoyin moved to Ankara Keçiörengücü in August 2021. Olawoyin made his debut in his side's 2–0 win over Adanaspor.

In his seventh appearance for the club, Olawoyin scored a brace to lead his side to a 3–2 win over visiting Istanbulspor.

Olawoyin joined Çaykur Rizespor on 9 January 2023.

== Career statistics ==
=== International ===
As of matches played 10 June 2024

National team	Year	Apps	Goals
Nigeria	2019	1	0
Nigeria	2024	1	0
Total		2	0
