= Çaykur Rizespor =

Turkish football club

- Full name: Çaykur Rize Spor Kulübü
- Nicknames: Karadeniz Atmacası (The Black Sea Sparrowhawk)
- Short name: Rizespor
- Founded: 19 May 1953; 73 years ago
- Stadium: Rize City Stadium
- Capacity: 14,879
- Coordinates: 41°02′31″N 40°34′24″E
- Owner: Çaykur
- President: Ali Zeki Saruhan
- Head coach: Recep Uçar
- League: Süper Lig
- 2025–26: Süper Lig, 8th of 18
- Website: caykurrizespor.org.tr
Home colours	Away colours	Third colours

Çaykur Rize Spor Kulübü is a Turkish professional football club based in Rize, a city on the eastern Black Sea coast. The team competes in the Süper Lig, the top tier of Turkish football. The club was originally founded on 19 May 1953, with its initial colors being green and yellow, representing the region’s connection to tea and citrus farming. Later the colors changed to green and blue.

In 1968, Rizespor merged with two other local clubs, Fener Gençlik and Güneşspor, leading to a reorganization of the club and the adoption of green and blue as its official colors—green representing the hills of Rize and blue symbolizing the Black Sea. The club has maintained these colors ever since.

Since 1990, Rizespor has been sponsored by the Turkish state-owned tea company Çaykur, leading to the official name change to Çaykur Rizespor Kulübü. This partnership also influenced the club’s visual identity, with a tea leaf becoming the central element of the club’s crest.

Çaykur Rizespor plays its home matches at Rize City Stadium, a newer facility located near the coast.

== History ==
=== Origins in Rize football (1919–1924) ===
Modern football in the city predates Çaykur Rizespor and grew out of two neighbourhood clubs formed in the immediate aftermath of World War I. Rize İdman Yurdu was the first organised sports club in Rize. It was established by local youths still recovering from the war years and was officially inaugurated on the first anniversary of the city’s liberation from occupation.

Guidance from officials such as Suphi Bey (then stationed in Rize) and senior security officer İsmail Kentay helped the group to secure a small two-room clubhouse next to the Rize Municipality building. In addition to football and gymnastics, the club maintained a music branch that later evolved into the Rize City Band; the instruments were donated by deputy Süleyman Sudi Sofoğlu, Member of Parliament for Lazistan.

A second club, Şark İdman Ocağı, began activities on 25 June 1923 out of the venue known as Barış Oteli. Its founding council included Ali Kemal Kavrakoğlu, Rıfkı Tuzcuoğlu, İshak Turnaoğlu, Hamdullah Şadoğlu, Hasan Biber, Riyazi Diren and Kamil Karadeniz. Despite the city’s conservative social climate at the time, Şark İdman Ocağı quickly built a loyal following and became a focal point for Rize’s growing sports culture.

The rivalry between the two clubs produced the city’s first regular derbies. Contemporary press records note an early meeting on 7 November 1923, when Şark İdman Ocağı defeated Rize İdman Yurdu 1–0; the referee was Captain İsmet Bey of the 7th Regiment, then stationed in Rize. These community teams laid the organisational and cultural groundwork from which the city’s later professional structure and ultimately Çaykur Rizespor emerged.

In the early years, Şark İdman Ocağı and Rize İdman Yurdu shaped the city’s game and its first local rivalry. Contemporary reports show the sides meeting regularly and arranging exhibition trips to neighbouring football centres such as Trabzon and Samsun, helping spread the sport along the eastern Black Sea coast.

Beyond football, both associations promoted gymnastics and general physical education; prominent organisers included Suphi Bey, who devoted particular energy to this branch. Şark İdman Ocağı maintained its activities for roughly two years, while Rize İdman Yurdu evolved through several stages of reorganisation and later provided the platform for the city’s subsequent club structures (including what would become Rize Fener Gençlik Kulübü), thereby preserving the footballing continuity that ultimately led to the foundation of Çaykur Rizespor.

=== Foundation ===
Rizespor were founded in Rize on 19 May 1953 the 34th anniversary of the Independence Day “to enhance the physical and cultural abilities of local youth”. The founding committee included Yakup Temizel, Atıf Taviloğlu, Bilsel, Yaşar Tümbeçkioğlu and Muharrem Kürkçü; Yaşar Dömekçioğlu served as the first president. The original club colours were yellow and green: “yellow” for the oranges and lemons then plentiful in the city, and “green” symbolising tea, which remains the emblem of Rize today.

From 1953 to 1968 the team competed as amateurs, with many of the province’s leading players wearing the club’s shirt. In 1968, a revised statute brought professional status through a merger with Rize Güneşspor, Rizegücü and Fener Gençlik; the restructured club adopted the blue-green (mavi-yeşil) colours to reflect the Black Sea and the tea fields, and were admitted to the TFF 2. Lig.

In their first professional campaign Rizespor missed out on promotion after a disciplinary ruling that awarded a 3–0 forfeit to Sivasspor and deducted two points from Rizespor, with Tarsus İdman Yurdu promoted instead. After a brief return to the amateur ranks they won the TFF 2. Lig in 1978–79 and earned the club’s first promotion to the TFF 1. Lig.

=== Recent history ===
On 9 February 1991 an extraordinary general assembly approved a merger with the state tea company Çaykur, after which the professional football section continued as “Çaykur Rizespor”.

Rizespor were relegated from the Süper Lig in 2001–02, but returned at the first attempt the following season via the TFF First League (then 1. Lig). They remained at the top level through 2003–04, but dropped again at the end of 2007–08.

Between 2008 and 2013 the club competed in the First League, finishing runners-up in 2012–13 to secure promotion back to the Süper Lig after five seasons away. Relegation followed in 2016–17, but Rizespor immediately won the 2017–18 First League title and returned once more to the top flight.

The 2020–21 campaign brought significant coaching changes: the club parted with Stjepan Tomas in November, appointed Marius Șumudică briefly, and closed the season under Bülent Uygun, finishing 13th on 48 points; in the Turkish Cup they exited in the round of 16 against Beşiktaş. Relegation came in 2021–22 after a 17th-place finish, but the team finished second in 2022–23 to win immediate promotion.

On 13 June 2023 the club appointed İlhan Palut as head coach after the departure of Bülent Korkmaz. Palut’s first season (2023–24) ended with a 9th-place finish on 50 points, the club’s best Süper Lig tally since their 2018–19 campaign. In May 2024 the board confirmed Palut’s continuation into 2024–25 with a medium-term sporting plan centred on academy development and targeted free-transfer acquisitions.

Beyond football, in February 2015 the club announced a multi-branch programme adding women’s football and 19 other disciplines (including basketball, handball, volleyball, rowing and athletics) to its structure as part of a broader community strategy.

== Rivalries ==
Rizespor’s principal rivalry is with Trabzonspor, and meetings between the sides are commonly billed in the Turkish press as the Karadeniz derbisi (Black Sea derby). The pairing draws on geographic proximity on the eastern Black Sea coast, regular league meetings since the 1970s and extensive away support travelling along the coastal highway. Local and national media routinely frame the match as a regional showcase fixture and note the heightened match-day security measures that accompany it.

A second traditional rivalry links Rizespor with Giresunspor and is often referred to as the Doğu Karadeniz derbisi. The two coastal neighbours have contested promotions and relegations across the First and Second League eras, and both clubs’ supporter groups—Rizespor’s Yeşil-Mavililer and Giresunspor’s Çotanaklar treat the fixture as a regional supremacy match.

Rizespor also share competitive, travel-friendly rivalries with fellow Black Sea clubs Samsunspor and with inland neighbours Erzurumspor, borne out of frequent clashes in the First League and high away followings on both sides.

== Stadium ==
For most of their professional history Rizespor played at the old Rize Atatürk Stadium, a compact, seaside ground close to the city centre. Opened in the 1950s and repeatedly refurbished, it served as the club’s home through promotions and relegations alike and was a regular venue for Black Sea derbies until it was decommissioned in the late 2000s as part of a wider urban renewal scheme.

Since the 2009–10 season the club have hosted home matches at the new Rize City Stadium on the city’s western outskirts. The venue initially known as New Rize City Stadium was inaugurated on 12 August 2009 with an opening match against Fenerbahçe. The all-seater stadium has a capacity of about 15,500, modern hospitality areas and full roof coverage; the playing surface is a hybrid natural grass system designed to cope with the region’s heavy rainfall.

In 2015 the facility’s naming rights were acquired by the state tea producer ÇAYKUR and the ground has since been marketed as the Çaykur Didi Stadyumu in league publications.

== Supporters ==
Rizespor supporters are commonly known as the Atmacalar (“Hawks”), a nickname that reflects the club crescent. On match days at the Çaykur Didi Stadium, groups traditionally gather behind each goal—one end facing the sea and the other the mountain side—while families and season-ticket holders occupy the lateral stands.

Rotasızlar

Formed in 2006, Rotasızlar is one of the most visible ultra groups. After initially spreading across several sections, the group settled behind the goal at the sea-side end of the new stadium. Rotasızlar are associated with the Askoroz area of the city and are known for continual, 90-minute vocal support, drums and large choreographies.

Atmacalar

Established in 2013 as an umbrella platform bringing together newly created sub-groups, the Atmacalar tribün unites younger supporters behind common songs and visual displays. The initiative aimed to coordinate away-day travel and stadium choreography and to reduce inter-group rivalry within the home stands.

Mekansızlar

Founded in 1999, Mekansızlar traditionally occupy the goal end on the mountain side of the ground. Composed largely of experienced names from the club’s supporter culture, they are noted for disciplined capo-led chants and for the banner “Dağdibi Cehennemi” (“Hell of Dağdibi”), a reference to the neighbourhood below the hillside stand.

Together these groups shape the club’s home atmosphere: coordinated tifos for key fixtures, continuous call-and-response songs, and corteos through the city centre on match days. While each maintains its own identity, they typically cooperate for major derbies and relegation or promotion deciders to present a single, unified end.

== Crest and Colors ==
Before the 1968 merger, Rizespor’s colors were green and yellow, while Fener Gençlik wore yellow and navy blue, and Güneşspor used yellow and red. When the three clubs united to form a single team, new colors were chosen to represent their shared identity. Inspired by nature, green was chosen to symbolize Rize’s rich greenery, and blue to represent the Black Sea. Since then, Rizespor has used green and blue (yeşil-mavi) as its official colors.

Rizespor’s crest has changed several times over the years, reflecting both the club’s development and its strong connection to the Rize region. The earliest logos featured the initials “RSK” (Rize Spor Kulübü) with the colors green and yellow, representing two of the area’s most well-known products: tea and citrus. Later designs replaced the initials with the full name “Rizespor” and adopted the green and blue color scheme.

A key element that has remained in every version of the crest is the tea leaf, which symbolizes the region’s deep ties to tea production. Over time, the design of the crest became more modern and simple, with cleaner lines and updated fonts. After the club merged with Çaykur, the name was changed to “Çaykur Rizespor Kulübü”, and this was reflected in the crest. The tea leaf became more stylized, and red lettering was added to give the design a fresh and recognizable look.

Despite changes in design over the years, the core identity of the crest—the tea leaf and the green-blue color combination—has stayed the same, showing Rizespor’s strong link to the culture, nature, and people of Rize.

=== Kit manufacturers and shirt sponsors ===
Period	Kit manufacturer	Shirt sponsor	Ref
2008–09	Adidas	Turkcell	
2009–10	Lotto	Çaykur	
2010–11	Umbro	Çaykur	
2011–12	Lotto	Çaykur	
2012–13	Lotto	Çaykur	
2013–14	Lotto	Çaykur	
2014–15	Lotto	Çaykur	
2015–16	Lotto	Çaykur	
2016–17	Nike	Çaykur	
2017–18	Nike	Çaykur	
2018–19	Nike	Çaykur	
2019–20	Nike	Çaykur	
2020–21	Nike	Çaykur	
2021–22	Nike	Çaykur	
2022–23	Umbro	Çaykur	
2023–	Nike	Çaykur	

== Achievements ==
=== Honours ===
- 1. Lig (second tier)
  - Champions: 1978–79, 1984–85, 2017–18
  - Play-off winners: 1999–2000
  - Runners-up: 2002–03, 2012–13, 2022–23
- 2. Lig (third tier)
  - Champions: 1993–94
  - Runners-up: 1973–74
- Turkish Cup
  - Semi-finals: 2002–03, 2007–08, 2015–16
  - Quarter-finals: 1986–87, 2003–04

=== League participation ===
- Süper Lig

1979–81, 1985–89, 2000–02, 2003–08, 2013–17, 2018–22, 2023–

- TFF 1. Lig

1974–79, 1981–85, 1989–93, 1994–00, 2002–03, 2008–13, 2017–18, 2022–23

- TFF 2. Lig

1968–74, 1993–94

=== Past Season Performances ===
Season	League	Pos.	M	W	D	L	GF	GA	Pts	Cup
1953–68: Competed in the Amateur League during these seasons.
1968–69	2. Lig	3rd	26	15	7	4	38	16	52	-
1969–70	2. Lig	6th	40	18	9	13	45	36	63	-
1970–71	2. Lig	3rd	28	17	6	5	51	14	57	-
1971–72	2. Lig	2nd	28	17	7	4	47	17	58	-
1972–73	2. Lig	2nd	24	16	4	4	34	11	52	-
1973–74	2. Lig	2nd	40	23	11	6	74	23	80	-
1974–75	1. Lig	10th	30	11	7	12	28	41	40	-
1975–76	1. Lig	4th	30	12	8	10	30	22	44	2nd Round
1976–77	1. Lig	5th	30	11	8	11	29	25	41	1st Round
1977–78	1. Lig	2nd	30	20	7	3	46	15	67	Last 16
1978–79	1. Lig	1st	29	15	11	3	40	15	56	Last 32
1979–80	Süper Lig	5th	30	14	4	12	37	34	46	Last 32
1980–81	Süper Lig	14th	30	11	7	12	35	42	40	Last 32
1981–82	1. Lig	2nd	28	14	9	5	43	16	51	2nd Round
1982–83	1. Lig	4th	30	14	5	11	37	32	47	2nd Round
1983–84	1. Lig	6th	30	11	8	11	25	28	41	Last 32
1984–85	1. Lig	1st	32	19	10	3	42	13	67	1st Round
1985–86	Süper Lig	15th	36	11	10	15	28	40	43	Last 32
1986–87	Süper Lig	13th	36	13	7	16	37	57	46	Quarter-finals
1987–88	Süper Lig	16th	38	13	7	18	37	56	46	3rd Round
1988–89	Süper Lig	17th	36	9	8	19	36	65	35	3rd Round
1989–90	1. Lig	3rd	32	14	5	13	56	53	47	Last 16
1990–91	1. Lig	7th	34	10	14	10	48	45	44	2nd Round
1991–92	1. Lig	10th	34	11	12	11	43	37	45	2nd Round
1992–93	1. Lig	11th	36	11	8	17	42	59	41	1st Round
1993–94	2. Lig	1st	24	18	3	3	51	8	57	1st Round
1994–95	1. Lig	8th	32	12	5	15	37	32	41	2nd Round
1995–96	1. Lig	3rd	35	14	10	11	32	39	46	2nd Round
1996–97	1. Lig	9th	36	13	10	13	35	36	49	2nd Round
1997–98	1. Lig	8th	36	14	7	15	37	54	49	2nd Round
1998–99	1. Lig	5th	39	20	11	8	73	49	71	4th Round
1999–2000	1. Lig	3rd	39	25	4	10	75	41	79	3rd Round
2000–01	Süper Lig	9th	34	13	7	14	45	43	46	Last 16
2001–02	Süper Lig	16th	34	9	10	15	43	51	46	Last 16
2002–03	1. Lig	2nd	34	21	3	10	63	31	66	Semi-finals
2003–04	Süper Lig	14th	34	13	3	18	37	53	42	Quarter-finals
2004–05	Süper Lig	10th	34	11	10	13	36	37	43	3rd Round
2005–06	Süper Lig	9th	34	10	11	13	35	44	41	2nd Round
2006–07	Süper Lig	15th	34	11	7	16	34	40	40	Group stage
2007–08	Süper Lig	17th	34	7	8	19	32	64	29	Semi-finals
2008–09	1. Lig	9th	34	13	8	13	39	44	47	2nd Round
2009–10	1. Lig	15th	34	10	10	14	37	53	40	3rd Round
2010–11	1. Lig	4th	36	15	10	9	39	31	55	2nd Round
2011–12	1. Lig	3rd	36	16	11	9	53	48	59	Last 16
2012–13	1. Lig	2nd	34	17	8	9	53	35	59	2nd Round
2013–14	Süper Lig	13th	34	10	12	12	43	43	42	3rd Round
2014–15	Süper Lig	14th	34	9	9	16	41	55	36	Last 16
2015–16	Süper Lig	13th	34	9	10	15	39	48	37	Semi-finals
2016–17	Süper Lig	16th	34	10	6	18	44	53	36	Quarter-finals
2017–18	1. Lig	1st	34	20	9	5	68	38	69	4th Round
2018–19	Süper Lig	11th	34	9	14	11	48	50	41	5th Round
2019–20	Süper Lig	15th	34	10	5	19	38	57	35	Last 16
2020–21	Süper Lig	13th	40	12	12	16	53	69	48	Last 16
2021–22	Süper Lig	17th	38	10	6	22	44	71	36	4th Round
2022–23	1. Lig	2nd	36	18	14	4	64	35	68	Last 16
2023–24	Süper Lig	9th	38	14	8	16	48	58	50	5th Round

== Players ==
=== Current squad ===
As of 4 September 2026

Note: Flags indicate national team as defined under FIFA eligibility rules; some limited exceptions apply. Players may hold more than one non-FIFA nationality.

No.	Pos.	Nation	Player
2	DF	UZB	Husniddin Aliqulov
4	DF	HUN	Attila Mocsi
5	DF	TUR	Tayyip Talha Sanuç
6	MF	MLI	Moussa Diakité (on loan from Cádiz)
7	MF	ROU	Valentin Mihăilă
8	MF	BIH	Dal Varešanović
9	FW	GAM	Ali Sowe
10	MF	NGR	Ibrahim Olawoyin
11	FW	SCO	Adedire Mebude
14	MF	TUR	Taylan Antalyalı (captain)
17	DF	MAR	Zakaria Ariss
19	DF	TUR	Umut Erdem
20	MF	ALB	Qazim Laçi
21	DF	FRA	Siaka Bakayoko
23	FW	TUR	Ahmed Kutucu (on loan from Galatasaray)

No.	Pos.	Nation	Player
29	FW	ITA	Gennaro Borrelli (on loan from Cagliari)
30	GK	TUR	Zafer Görgen
31	GK	TUR	Hasan Döne
37	DF	TUR	Taha Şahin
47	MF	TUR	Emirhan Yılmaz
53	FW	ROU	Iustin Doicaru
54	DF	TUR	Mithat Pala
70	MF	GER	Can Bozdoğan
75	GK	CIV	Yahia Fofana
80	FW	TUR	Mustafa Coşkun Tosun
93	DF	MLI	Modibo Sagnan
94	DF	TUR	Yakup Ayan
97	GK	TUR	Efe Doğan
99	FW	TUR	Emrecan Bulut

=== Out on loan ===
Note: Flags indicate national team as defined under FIFA eligibility rules; some limited exceptions apply. Players may hold more than one non-FIFA nationality.

No.	Pos.	Nation	Player
—	GK	TUR	Erdem Canpolat (at Esenler Erokspor until 30 June 2027)
—	DF	TUR	Furkan Orak (at Esenler Erokspor until 30 June 2027)
—	DF	TUR	Eray Korkmaz (at Mardin 1969 Spor until 30 June 2027)
—	DF	TUR	Anıl Yaşar (at Eyüpspor until 30 June 2027)

No.	Pos.	Nation	Player
—	MF	BIH	Muhamed Buljubašić (at Esenler Erokspor until 30 June 2027)
—	FW	TUR	Muhammed Baltacı (at Pazarspor until 30 June 2027)
—	FW	SEN	Mame Mor Faye (at Esenler Erokspor until 30 June 2027)

== Non-playing staff ==
=== Administrative Staff ===
Position	Name
Chairman	(Turkey) İbrahim Turgut
Vice Chairman	(Turkey) Adnan Er
Deputy Chairman	(Turkey) Ali Haydar Er
Treasurer	(Turkey) Ahmet Dokumacı
Member	(Turkey) Fatih Bakoğlu
Member	(Turkey) Yusuf Ziya Alim
Member	(Turkey) Serkan Karavin
Member	(Turkey) Devrim Orkun Kalkavan
Press Spokesperson	(Turkey) Hasan Yavuz Bakır
Stadium Manager	(Turkey) Ahmet Yılmaz Zehiroğlu

=== Technical Staff ===
Position	Name
Head coach	(Turkey) Recep Uçar
Assistant coach	(Turkey) Fevzi Korkmaz
Assistant coach	(Austria) Ekrem Dağ
Goalkeeping coach	(Turkey) Ferhat Odabaşı
Goalkeeping coach	(Turkey) Hakan Türüt
Athletic coach	(Turkey) Can Emre Kaplanoğlu
Athletic coach	(Turkey) Enes Kalender
Match analyst	(Turkey) Oğuzhan Arslan
Match analyst	(Turkey) Kerim Atakan Kart
Head of Academy	(Turkey) İsmail Demirci
Club doctor	(Turkey) Muhammet Hakan Ayaz

== Coaching history ==
Tenure	Name
1968–69	(Turkey) Şenol Birol
1969–70	(Turkey) Ahmet Şamlıoğlu
1970–72	(Turkey) Münacettin Barut
1972–74	(Turkey) Gazanfer Olcayto
1974–75	(Turkey) Turgut Kafkas
1975–76	(Turkey) Suat Mamat
1976–77	(Turkey) Tekin Yolaç
1977	(Turkey) İlhan Uralgil
1977–78	(Turkey) Erdoğan Gürhan
1978–79	(Turkey) Gürsel Aksel
1979–80	(Turkey) Zeynel Soyuer
1980–81	(Turkey) Cevdet Soyluoğlu
1981	(Turkey) Halil Güngördü
1981–82	(Turkey) Turgut Kafkas
1982–83	(Turkey) Tezcan Uzcan
1983–84	(Turkey) Suphi Varol
1984–85	(Turkey) Cesarettin Alptekin
1985–86	(Turkey) Enver Katip
1986–87	(Turkey) Nedim Günar
1987–88	(Turkey) Fethi Demican
1988	(Turkey) Davut Şahin
1988–89	(Germany) Adolf Remy
1989–90	(Turkey) Cesarettin Alptekin
1990–92	(Turkey) Enver Katip
1992–93	(Turkey) Numan Zafer Kanburoğlu
1993–95	(Turkey) Giray Bulak
1995–96	(Turkey) Kadir Özcan
1996–97	(Turkey) Ömer Kaner
1997	(Turkey) Ali Kemal Denizci
1997–98	(Turkey) Yaşar Elmas
1998–99	(Turkey) Celal Kıbrızlı
1999	(Turkey) Hikmet Karaman
1999–00	(Turkey) Cem Pamiroğlu
2000	(Turkey) Rasim Kara
2000–02	(Slovakia) Karol Pecze
2002–03	(Turkey) Fuat Yaman
2003	(Turkey) Hikmet Karaman
2003–04	(Turkey) Yılmaz Vural
2004–05	(Turkey) Rıza Çalımbay
2005	(Turkey) Erdoğan Arıca
2005	(Turkey) Metin Yıldız
2005	(Turkey) Sakıp Özberk
2005–06	(Turkey) Güvenç Kurtar
2006	(Bosnia and Herzegovina) Safet Sušić
2006–07	(Turkey) Rıza Çalımbay
2007	(Turkey) Samet Aybaba
2007–08	(Bosnia and Herzegovina) Safet Sušić
2008	(Turkey) Erdoğan Arıca
2008	(Turkey) Metin Diyadin
2008–09	(Turkey) Suat Kaya
2009	(Turkey) Raşit Çetiner
2009	(Turkey) Oktay Çevik
2009–10	(Turkey) Mehmet Şansal
2010	(Turkey) Ümit Kayıhan
2010–12	(Turkey) Hüseyin Kalpar
2012	(Turkey) Giray Bulak
2012	(Turkey) Engin Korukır
2012–13	(Turkey) Mustafa Denizli
2013	(Turkey) Rıza Çalımbay
2014	(Turkey) Uğur Tütüneker
2014	(Turkey) Mehmet Özdilek
2014–17	(Turkey) Hikmet Karaman
2017–18	(Turkey) İbrahim Üzülmez
2018–19	(Turkey) Okan Buruk
2019	(Turkey) İsmail Kartal
2020	(Turkey) Ünal Karaman
2020–21	(Croatia) Stjepan Tomas
2021	(Romania) Marius Şumudică
2021–22	(Turkey) Bülent Uygun
2022	(Turkey) Hamza Hamzaoğlu
2022–23	(Turkey) Bülent Korkmaz
2023–25	(Turkey) İlhan Palut
2025–	(Turkey) Recep Uçar

== Presidential history ==
As of 4 November 2021

Tenure	Name
1968–1973	(Turkey) Bahattin Coşkun
1973–1975	(Turkey) Reşat Uçak
1975–1978	(Turkey) Mustafa Rakıcıoğlu
1978	(Turkey) Köksal Mataracı
1978–1980	(Turkey) Nuri Akbulut
1980–1981	(Turkey) Paşa Ali Alaman
1981	(Turkey) Nuri Akbulut
1981–1983	(Turkey) Ali Rıza Feyiz
1984	(Turkey) Hasan Yardımcı
1985	(Turkey) Fehmi Ekşi
1986	(Turkey) Servet Takış
1987–1988	(Turkey) Mehmet Yılmaz
1988–1989	(Turkey) Şadan Tuzcu
1989	(Turkey) Şeref Keçeli
1989–1990	(Turkey) Ahmet Akyıldız
1990	(Turkey) Muharrem Kürkçü
1990	(Turkey) Hamit Oral
1990–1991	(Turkey) Hasan Basri Çillioğlu
1991–1992	(Turkey) Nejat Ural
1992	(Turkey) Süreyya Turgut
1992–1995	(Turkey) Tuncer Ergüven
1995	(Turkey) Ruşen Kukul
1995	(Turkey) Tuncer Ergüven
1995–1996	(Turkey) İsmail Topçu
1996	(Turkey) Ali Baba Çillioğlu
1996	(Turkey) Cemal Aydoğdu
1996–1997	(Turkey) Mehmet Cengiz
1997–1998	(Turkey) Mehmet Aslankaya
1998–2002	(Turkey) Mehmet Cengiz
2002–2007	(Turkey) Ekrem Cengiz
2007–2009	(Turkey) Abdülkadir Çakır
2009–2010	(Turkey) Halim Mete
2010–2017	(Turkey) Metin Kalkavan
2017–2018	(Turkey) Hasan Kemal Yardımcı
2018–2021	(Turkey) Hasan Kartal
2021–2022	(Turkey) Tahir Kıran
2022–2026	(Turkey) İbrahim Turgut
2026–	(Turkey) Ali Zeki Saruhan

== Multi-sport structure and community programmes ==
In February 2015 the club announced that it would operate as a multi-branch sports organisation attached to the Çaykur Rizespor association, adding women’s football and 19 additional amateur and semi-professional sections to its structure as part of a broader community strategy.

The programme formally opened or revived teams in basketball, handball, volleyball, athletics, rowing, swimming, wrestling, judo, boxing, table tennis, badminton, tennis, sailing, canoeing, mountaineering, cycling and selected school-age indoor sports, alongside community fitness classes and girls’ football schools in the city and districts.

Within the same framework the club expanded its youth-academy network through cooperation protocols with local education authorities and municipal sports directorates, prioritising talent identification in Rize’s coastal and highland towns and offering coaching-education seminars to PE teachers. The multi-sport structure is overseen by the club association rather than the professional football company and is financed through a combination of municipal support, federation grants and club sponsorship income, with the stated aim of broadening participation and creating a pathway from school sport to elite teams representing the province in national leagues.
