= 2022–23 Adana Demirspor season =

Adana Demirspor
2022–23 season
- President: Murat Sancak
- Head coach: Vincenzo Montella
- Stadium: New Adana Stadium
- Süper Lig: 4th
- Turkish Cup: Fourth round
- Top goalscorer: League: Younès Belhanda (12); All: Younès Belhanda (12)
- Biggest win: 6–0 v İstanbulspor (Home); 5 January 2023 (Süper Lig)
- Biggest defeat: 1–4 v Trabzonspor (Away); 12 March 2023 (Süper Lig)
Home colours	Away colours	Third colours

The 2022–23 season was the 83rd in the history of Adana Demirspor and their second consecutive season in the top flight. The club participated in the Süper Lig and the Turkish Cup,

== Players ==
=== First-team squad ===
As of 4 February 2023

Note: Flags indicate national team as defined under FIFA eligibility rules; some limited exceptions apply. Players may hold more than one non-FIFA nationality.

No.	Pos.	Nation	Player
3	DF	TUR	Abdurrahim Dursun
4	DF	GER	Semih Güler
6	MF	TUR	Mustafa Kapı
7	FW	NGR	Henry Onyekuru
8	MF	ISL	Birkir Bjarnason
10	MF	MAR	Younès Belhanda
11	FW	NGR	David Akintola
15	DF	MKD	Jovan Manev
16	DF	TUR	İsmail Çokçalış
17	MF	SEN	Badou Ndiaye
18	GK	BIH	Goran Karačić
20	MF	TUR	Emre Akbaba
22	DF	NOR	Jonas Svensson
23	FW	NOR	Fredrik Gulbrandsen

No.	Pos.	Nation	Player
25	GK	TUR	Ertaç Özbir
26	MF	TUR	Yusuf Sari
27	FW	GEO	Giorgi Khabuliani
28	FW	TUR	Salih Kavrazli
29	FW	SEN	Cherif Ndiaye
30	MF	TUR	Gökhan Töre
39	GK	TUR	Vedat Karakuş
45	DF	TUR	Mert Çetin
50	MF	ENG	Erhun Oztumer
77	DF	POR	Kévin Rodrigues
88	MF	SUI	Gökhan Inler (Captain)
90	MF	FRA	Benjamin Stambouli (Vice-captain)
91	DF	CIV	Simon Deli
99	DF	TUR	Ata Öztürk

==== Out on loan ====
Note: Flags indicate national team as defined under FIFA eligibility rules; some limited exceptions apply. Players may hold more than one non-FIFA nationality.

No.	Pos.	Nation	Player
—	DF	TUR	Tolga Kalender (on loan to Bayrampaşa)
—	MF	TUR	Erkam Develi (on loan to Bayrampaşa)
—	MF	TUR	Burhan Ersoy (on loan to Bayrampaşa)
—	MF	TUR	Tayfun Aydoğan (on loan to Tuzlaspor)
—	MF	TUR	İzzet Çelik (on loan to Bayrampaşa)
—	MF	GER	Bünyamin Balat (on loan to Denizlispor)

No.	Pos.	Nation	Player
21	MF	ALB	Arda Okan Kurtulan (on loan to Karacabey Belediyespor)
—	FW	TUR	Yiğit Gümüş (on loan to Bayrampaşa)
—	FW	TUR	Çağan Atik (on loan to Bayrampaşa)
—	FW	TUR	Musa Bulut (on loan to Niğde Anadolu)
—	FW	ITA	Enock Barwuah (on loan to Menemenspor)
—	FW	NGR	Francis Ezeh (on loan to Tuzlaspor)
—	FW	TUR	Ali Yavuz Kol (on loan to 24 Erzincanspor)

== Transfers ==
=== Released ===
Date from	Position	Nationality	Player	To	Notes	Ref.
1 July 2022	FW	(France)	Loïc Rémy		End of contract	
16 July 2022	LW	(Turkey)	Mustafa Yilmaz	(Turkey) Iğdır	End of contract	
6 November 2022	FW	(Russia)	Artem Dzyuba		Mutual agreement	
3 December 2022	DF	(Ukraine)	Yaroslav Rakitskyi		Mutual agreement	
26 January 2023	MF	(Turkey)	Berk Yıldız	(Turkey) Boluspor	Mutual agreement	
29 January 2023	FW	(Democratic Republic of the Congo)	Britt Assombalonga	(England) Watford	Mutual agreement	

- Note: Players will join other clubs after being released or terminated from their contract. Only the following clubs are mentioned when that club signed the player in the same transfer window.

=== Loans in ===
Date from	Position	Nationality	Player	From	Date until	Ref.
3 July 2022	DF	(North Macedonia)	Jovan Manev	(North Macedonia) Bregalnica Štip	End of season	
10 July 2022	MF	(Nigeria)	Henry Onyekuru	(Greece) Olympiacos	End of season	
19 January 2023	DF	(Turkey)	Mert Çetin	(Italy) Hellas Verona	End of season	
28 January 2023	FW	(Senegal)	Cherif Ndiaye	(China) Shanghai Port	End of season	

=== Loans out ===
Date from	Position	Nationality	Player	To	Date until	Ref.
1 July 2022	MF	(Turkey)	Sedat Sahintürk	(Turkey) Bandırmaspor	End of season	
12 January 2023	MF	(Mali)	Mahamadou Ba	(Turkey) İstanbulspor	End of season	

=== Transfers in ===
Date from	Position	Nationality	Player	From	Fee	Ref.
1 July 2022	MF	(Syria)	Aias Aosman	(Greece) Ionikos F.C.	Free	
23 July 2022	DF	(Ukraine)	Yaroslav Rakitskyi	Free agent	Free	

=== Transfers out ===
Date from	Position	Nationality	Player	To	Fee	Ref.
31 August 2022	FW	(Italy)	Mario Balotelli	(Switzerland) Sion	€2,600,000	
7 September 2022	DF	(Senegal)	Joher Rassoul	(Turkey) Eyüpspor	Undisclosed	
8 September 2022	DF	(Turkey)	Tayyip Talha Sanuç	(Turkey) Beşiktaş	Undisclosed	
11 January 2023	DF	(Turkey)	Samet Akaydin	(Turkey) Fenerbahçe	€3,700,000	

== Pre-season and friendlies ==
Win Draw Loss Fixtures

8 July 2022 Friendly	Adana Demirspor (Turkey)	0–2	(Turkey) Gaziantep	Karacasu
15:30 TRT (UTC+3)			Veliu 22'; Kuzucu 85'	Stadium: Bolu Termal Otel Tesisleri

12 July 2022 Friendly	Adana Demirspor (Turkey)	0–2	(Qatar) Umm Salal	Bolu
16:45 TRT (UTC+3)			Kodjia 36', 51'	Stadium: Koru Hotel Futbol Sahası

15 July 2022 Friendly	Adana Demirspor (Turkey)	3–1	(Turkey) İstanbulspor	Karacasu
16:00 TRT (UTC+3)	Assombalonga 36'; Onyekuru 41'; Oztumer 75'		Topalli 1'; Yılmaz 7'	Stadium: Bolu Termal Otel Tesisleri

24 July 2022 Friendly	Pescara (Italy)	2–1	(Turkey) Adana Demirspor	Palena, Italy
17:30 CEST (UTC+2)	Lescano 29'; Cuppone 60' (pen.)		Assombalonga 4'; Karakuş (yellow card)	Stadium: Stadio degli Angeli; Referee: Valerio Pezzopane (Italy)

27 July 2022 Friendly	Napoli (Italy)	2–2	(Turkey) Adana Demirspor	Castel di Sangro, Italy
20:30 CEST (UTC+2)	Lozano 56'; Çokçalış 90+3' (o.g.)		Ndiaye (yellow card) 41'; Balotelli 74' (pen.); Sari 87' (pen.)	Stadium: Stadio Teofilo Patini; Referee: Giacomo Camplone (Italy)

4 December 2022 Friendly	Adana Demirspor (Turkey)	3–6	(Israel) Maccabi Tel Aviv	Belek
17:00 TRT (UTC+3)	Akaydin 11'; David 39'; Belhanda 68'			Stadium: Hotel RIU Kaya - Field C

5 December 2022 Friendly	Adana Demirspor (Turkey)	1–2	(Netherlands) Fortuna Sittard	Aksu
13:30 TRT (UTC+3)	Onyekuru 28'		Gladon 8'; Embaló 38'	Stadium: Mardan Sports Complex

8 December 2022 Friendly	Adana Demirspor (Turkey)	5–0	(Latvia) Liepaja	Antalya
13:30 TRT (UTC+3)	Stambouli 1'; Oztumer 39'; Assombalonga 55'; Khabuliani 81'; Akbaba 84'	Report		Stadium: Titanic Hotel Spor Kompleks Field 1

10 December 2022 Friendly	Galatasaray (Turkey)	2–2	(Turkey) Adana Demirspor	Aksu
20:00 TRT (UTC+3)	Demir 50', 75'	Report	Gulbrandsen 13', 60'	Stadium: Mardan Sports Complex

15 December 2022 Friendly	Adana Demirspor (Turkey)	2–2	(Italy) Sampdoria	Adana
17:30 TRT (UTC+3)	Yıldız 27'; Inler 90+4'	Report	Caputo 33'; Murillo 37'	Stadium: New Adana Stadium

19 February 2023 Friendly	Dynamo Kyiv (Ukraine)	0–0	(Turkey) Adana Demirspor	Aksu
17:00 TRT (UTC+3)		Report		Stadium: Mardan Sports Complex

== Competitions ==
=== Overall record ===
Competition	First match	Last match	Starting round	Final position	Record							
Competition	First match	Last match	Starting round	Final position	Pld	W	D	L	GF	GA	GD	Win %
Süper Lig	7 August 2022	7 June 2023	Matchday 1	4th	36	20	9	7	76	45	+31	55.56
Turkish Cup	18 October 2022	22 December 2022	Third round	Fifth round	3	2	0	1	12	7	+5	66.67
Total					39	22	9	8	88	52	+36	56.41

Source: Soccerway

=== Süper Lig ===
==== League table ====
Pos	Team	Pld	W	D	L	GF	GA	GD	Pts	Qualification or relegation
2	Fenerbahçe	36	25	5	6	87	42	+45	80	Qualification for the Europa Conference League second qualifying round
3	Beşiktaş	36	23	9	4	78	36	+42	78	Qualification for the Europa Conference League second qualifying round
4	Adana Demirspor	36	20	9	7	76	45	+31	69	Qualification for the Europa Conference League second qualifying round
5	Başakşehir	36	18	8	10	54	37	+17	62	
6	Trabzonspor	36	17	6	13	64	54	+10	57	

Source: Süper Lig
Rules for classification: 1) Points; 2) Head-to-head points; 3) Head-to-head goal difference; 4) Head-to-head goals scored; 5) Goal difference; 6) Goals scored; 7) Play-off.

==== Results summary ====
Overall								Home						Away					
Pld	W	D	L	GF	GA	GD	Pts	W	D	L	GF	GA	GD	W	D	L	GF	GA	GD
36	20	9	7	76	45	+31	69	12	4	2	46	19	+27	8	5	5	30	26	+4

Source: Spor Toto Süper Lig

==== Results by round ====
Round	1	2	3	4	5	6	7	8	9	10	11	12	13	14	15	16	17	18	19	20	21	22	23	24	25	26	27	28	29	30	31	32	33	34	35	36	37	38
Ground	A	H	A	H	A	H	A	H	A	A	H	A	B	A	H	A	H	A	H	H	A	H	A	H	A	H	A	H	H	A	H	B	H	A	H	A	H	A
Result	W	W	L	W	D	W	W	D	D	W	D	D	B	D	W	L	W	L	W	D	W	D	D	W	L	W	L	W	W	W	W	B	W	W	L	W	L	W
Position	4	1	6	3	6	4	1	2	1	1	2	3	4	3	3	4	4	4	4	6	5	5	5	4	4	4	4	4	4	4	4	4	4	4	4	4	4	4

Source: Spor Toto Süper Lig
A = Away; H = Home; B = Bye; W = Win; D = Draw; L = Loss

==== Matches ====
The league schedule was released on 4 July.

7 August 2022 1	Giresunspor	2–3	Adana Demirspor	Istanbul
19:15 TRT (UTC+3)	Sainz 56'; Berişbek 90+1'	Report	Inler 23'; Belhanda 28'; Onyekuru 82'	Stadium: Şükrü Saracoğlu Stadium; Referee: Volkan Bayarslan

13 August 2022 2	Adana Demirspor	3–0	Sivasspor	Adana
21:45 TRT (UTC+3)	Belhanda 41'; Onyekuru 51'; Akintola 70'	Report		Stadium: New Adana Stadium; Referee: Mert Güzenge

22 August 2022 3	Fenerbahçe	4–2	Adana Demirspor	Istanbul
21:45 TRT (UTC+3)	Valencia 20' (pen.), 41'; Zajc 47'; Alioski 83'	Report	Belhanda 56' (pen.); Dzyuba 66'	Stadium: Şükrü Saracoğlu Stadium; Referee: Abdulkadir Bitigen

27 August 2022 4	Adana Demirspor	1–0	Ümraniyespor	Adana
21:45 TRT (UTC+3)	Rodrigues 6'	Report		Stadium: New Adana Stadium; Referee: Kadir Sağlam

4 September 2022 5	Hatayspor	1–1	Adana Demirspor	Antakya
19:15 TRT (UTC+3)	Ergün 21'	Report	Sanuç 90+8'	Stadium: New Hatay Stadium; Referee: Burak Şeker

12 September 2022 6	Adana Demirspor	3–2	Trabzonspor	Adana
21:30 TRT (UTC+3)	Rodrigues 10'; B. Ndiaye 55'; Akaydın 90+4'	Report	Bakasetas 37' (pen.); Bozok 84'	Stadium: New Adana Stadium; Referee: Atilla Karaoğlan

17 September 2022 7	Antalyaspor	0–3	Adana Demirspor	Antalya
20:00 TRT (UTC+3)		Report	Belhanda 1'; Gulbrandsen 75'; Assombalonga 84'	Stadium: Antalya Stadium; Referee: Ali Palabıyık

1 October 2022 8	Adana Demirspor	0–0	Galatasaray	Adana
20:00 TRT (UTC+3)		Report		Stadium: New Adana Stadium; Referee: Halil Umut Meler

7 October 2022 9	Gaziantep	1–1	Adana Demirspor	Gaziantep
20:00 TRT (UTC+3)	Marković 69'	Report	Assombalonga 60'	Stadium: Gaziantep Stadium; Referee: Sarper Barış Saka

15 October 2022 10	Kasımpaşa	1–4	Adana Demirspor	Istanbul
17:00 TRT (UTC+3)	Bahoken 56'	Report	Belhanda 38'; Akintola 41'; Onyekuru 64'; B. Ndiaye 86'	Stadium: Recep Tayyip Erdoğan Stadium; Referee: Tugay Kaan Numanoğlu

23 October 2022 11	Adana Demirspor	1–1	Konyaspor	Adana
17:00 TRT (UTC+3)	Akintola 32'	Report	Diouf 22'	Stadium: New Adana Stadium; Referee: Hüseyin Göçek

30 October 2022 12	Kayserispor	2–2	Adana Demirspor	Kayseri
17:00 TRT (UTC+3)	Gavranović 68'; Cardoso 82'	Report	12' B. Ndiaye; 65' Onyekuru	Stadium: Kadir Has Stadium; Referee: Volkan Bayarslan

13	Bye

11 November 2022 14	Alanyaspor	0–0	Adana Demirspor	Alanya
20:00 TRT (UTC+3)		Report		Stadium: Kırbıyık Holding Stadium; Referee: Çağdaş Altay

25 December 2022 15	Adana Demirspor	2–1	Fatih Karagümrük	Adana
13:30 TRT (UTC+3)	Akbaba 11', 43'	Report	19' Borini	Stadium: New Adana Stadium; Referee: Erkan Özdamar

29 December 2022 16	Beşiktaş	1–0	Adana Demirspor	Istanbul
20:00 TRT (UTC+3)	Masuaku 14'	Report		Stadium: Vodafone Park; Referee: Alī Şansalan

5 January 2023 17	Adana Demirspor	6–0	İstanbulspor	Adana
20:00 TRT (UTC+3)	Belhanda 29' (pen.); Sari 49'; Onyekuru 55', 80'; B. Ndiaye 65' (pen.); Töre 82'	Report		Stadium: New Adana Stadium; Referee: Mete Kalkavan

9 January 2023 18	İstanbul Başakşehir	2–1	Adana Demirspor	Istanbul
15:00 TRT (UTC+3)	Türüç 52' (pen.); Gürler 62'	Report	58' Akaydin	Stadium: Başakşehir Fatih Terim Stadium; Referee: Arda Kardeşler

14 January 2023 19	Adana Demirspor	3–1	Ankaragücü	Adana
14:00 TRT (UTC+3)	Sari 49'; Akbaba 66'; Inler 77'	Report	61' Radaković	Stadium: New Adana Stadium; Referee: Burak Şeker

20 January 2023 20	Adana Demirspor	1–1	Giresunspor	Adana
18:00 TRT (UTC+3)	B. Ndiaye 84'	Report	13' (pen.) Bajić	Stadium: New Adana Stadium; Referee: Yasin Kol

28 January 2023 21	Sivasspor	1–2	Adana Demirspor	Malatya
13:30 TRT (UTC+3)	Cofie 63'	Report	41' Akbaba; 56' Akintola	Stadium: New Malatya Stadium; Referee: Burak Pakkan

2 February 2023 22	Adana Demirspor	1–1	Fenerbahçe	Adana
20:00 TRT (UTC+3)	Belhanda (penalty missed) 32'; Onyekuru (yellow card) 45+10'; Svensson (yellow card) 75'; C. Ndiaye 83' (pen.)	Report	Kahveci (yellow card) 30'; Batshuayi (yellow card) 74'; Bayındır (yellow card) 83'; Valencia 88'	Stadium: New Adana Stadium; Attendance: 29,298; Referee: Ali Palabıyık

26 February 2023 23	Ümraniyespor	1–1	Adana Demirspor	Istanbul
16:00 TRT (UTC+3)	Kayode 90'	Report	B. Ndiaye 79'	Stadium: Ümraniye Municipality City Stadium; Referee: Atilla Karaoğlan

24	Adana Demirspor	3–0	Hatayspor	Adana
		Report		Stadium: New Adana Stadium

12 March 2023 25	Trabzonspor	4–1	Adana Demirspor	Trabzon
16:00	Yazıcı 8'; Peres (yellow card) 21'; Hugo 78'; Višća 81'; Bozok 90+4'	Report	Belhanda (red card) 22'; B. Ndiaye 45+1'; C. Ndiaye (yellow card) 90+8'	Stadium: Şenol Güneş Sports Complex; Attendance: 15,390; Referee: Abdulkadir Bitigen; Assistant referees: Kemal Yılmaz, Mustafa Savranlar; Fourth official: Cihan Aydın

18 March 2023 26	Adana Demirspor	2–0	Antalyaspor	Adana
16:00 TRT (UTC+3)	Çetin (yellow card) 17'; Akbaba 33'; C. Ndiaye 45+2', (penalty missed) 59'	Report	Sarı (yellow card) 57'; Toprak (yellow card) 61'	Stadium: New Adana Stadium; Attendance: 7,982; Referee: Bahattin Şimşek

1 April 2023 27	Galatasaray	2–0	Adana Demirspor	Istanbul
20:30 TRT	Oliveira (yellow card) 31'; Mertens (yellow card) 55'; Adekugbe (yellow card) 59'; Midtsjø 86'; Zaniolo 90+8' (pen.); Boey (yellow card) 90+12'	Report	Svensson (yellow card) 35'; Akbaba (yellow card) 38'; David (yellow card) 40'; Gulbrandsen (yellow card) 90+11'	Stadium: Nef Stadium; Attendance: 44,782; Referee: Ali Şansalan

28	Adana Demirspor	3–0	Gaziantep	Adana
		Report		Stadium: New Adana Stadium

15 April 2023 29	Adana Demirspor	5–0	Kasımpaşa	Adana
16:00 TRT (UTC+3)	Akintola 18', 21'; Sarı 27'; Morel (yellow card) 51'; Güler (yellow card) 54'; B. Ndiaye 80'; Belhanda 90' (pen.)	Report	Özcan (yellow card) 19'; Djilobodji (yellow card) 25'; Fabiano (yellow card) 84'	Stadium: New Adana Stadium; Attendance: 11,455; Referee: Ümit Öztürk

19 April 2023 30	Konyaspor	1–2	Adana Demirspor	Konya
20:30 TRT (UTC+3)	Moreno (yellow card) 35'; Emreli 40', (yellow card) 90+11'; Šehić (yellow card) 57'	Report	B. Ndiaye (yellow card) 13', (goal) 28'; Akintola (red card) 48'; C. Ndiaye 56' (pen.); Svensson (yellow card) 70'	Stadium: Konya Metropolitan Municipality Stadium; Attendance: 8,762; Referee: Sarper Barış Saka

23 April 2023 31	Adana Demirspor	5–3	Kayserispor	Adana
16:00 TRT (UTC+3)	C. Ndiaye 7', 27'; Belhanda 32'; Sarı 45+6'; Çokçalış (yellow card) 46'; Onyekuru 52' (pen.); Akbaba (yellow card) 87'	Report	Thiam 24', 30', 45+4'; Kocaman (yellow card) 51'; Cardoso (yellow card) 59'; Mensah (yellow card) 76'; Bayazıt (red card) 83'	Stadium: New Adana Stadium; Attendance: 16,823; Referee: Direnç Tonusluoğlu

32	Bye

6 May 2023 33	Adana Demirspor	4–2	Alanyaspor	Adana
21:00 TRT (UTC+3)	C. Ndiaye 18'; Belhanda 45+5', 66'; Sarı 56'; Svensson (yellow card) 63'	Report	Koulouris 11', (yellow card) 45+15'; Bayır (yellow card) 44'; Karaca 45+11' (pen.)	Stadium: New Adana Stadium; Referee: Hüseyin Göçek

17 May 2023 34	Fatih Karagümrük	2–3	Adana Demirspor	Istanbul
20:00 TRT (UTC+3)	Shukurov (yellow card) 21'; Baniya (yellow card) 34'; Özbir 44' (o.g.); Drešević (yellow card) 65'; Diagne 80'; Ozdoyev (yellow card) 90+5'	Report	Inler (yellow card) 1'; C. Ndiaye 51'; Sari (yellow card) 61'; Onyekuru 76'; Drešević 84' (o.g.)	Stadium: Atatürk Olympic Stadium; Referee: Kadir Sağlam

21 May 2023 35	Adana Demirspor	1–4	Beşiktaş	Adana
19:00 TRT (UTC+3)	Belhanda 19' (yellow card) 20'; Akintola (yellow card) 48'; Rodrigues (yellow card) 72'; Özbir (yellow card) 90+4'	Report	Fernandes (yellow card) 23' (goal) 46'; Aboubakar 45+4', 90+5' (pen.); Uçan (yellow card) 48'; Rosier (yellow card) 52'; Colley (yellow card) 53'; Tosun 72' (pen.); Hadžiahmetović (yellow card) 81'	Stadium: New Adana Stadium; Referee: Mustafa Kürşad Filiz

30 May 2023 36	İstanbulspor	0–2	Adana Demirspor	Istanbul
20:00 TRT (UTC+3)	Sarıkaya (yellow card) 77'	Report	Akbaba 35', (yellow card) 43'; Gulbrandsen 90'	Stadium: Necmi Kadıoğlu Stadium; Referee: Ümit Öztürk

3 June 2023 37	Adana Demirspor	2–3	İstanbul Başakşehir	Adana
19:00 TRT (UTC+3)	Stambouli 7'; Rodrigues (yellow card) 32'; Morel 48'	Report	Kény 10', 86'; Figueiredo 26'; Januzaj (yellow card) 73'	Stadium: New Adana Stadium; Referee: Erkan Özdamar

7 June 2023 38	Ankaragücü	1–2	Adana Demirspor	Ankara
20:00 TRT (UTC+3)	Milson 83'	Report	Belhanda 31'; Akbaba 57'	Stadium: Eryaman Stadium; Referee: Çağdaş Altay

=== Turkish Cup ===
18 October 2022 Third round	Adana Demirspor	5–0	Adıyaman FK	Adana
20:30 TRT	Sari 44'; Oztumer 60', 64', 74'; Töre 85'	Report		Stadium: New Adana Stadium; Referee: Turgut Doman

9 November 2022 Fourth round	Adana Demirspor	4–3	Nazilli Belediyespor	Adana
19:00 TRT	Assombalonga 15', 29' (pen.), 51', 90+6' (pen.)	Report	13' Aydoğmuş; 34' Kılıçaslan; 63' Apaydın	Stadium: New Adana Stadium; Referee: Emre Kargın

22 December 2022 Fifth round	Adana Demirspor	3–4 (a.e.t.)	Çaykur Rizespor	Adana
19:00 TRT	Akintola 68' (pen.); Öztürk 85' (o.g.); Sarı 116'	Report	7' Yılmaz; 45+1' Hümmet; 105' Kanatsızkuş; 108' Koç	Stadium: New Adana Stadium; Referee: Hüseyin Sabancı

== Statistics ==
=== Appearances and goals ===
No.	Pos.	Player	Süper Lig		Turkish Cup		Total	
No.	Pos.	Player	Apps	Goals	Apps	Goals	Apps	Goals
3	DF	(Turkey) Abdurrahim Dursun	4	-	3	-	7	0
4	DF	(Germany) Semih Güler	16	-	3	-	19	0
6	MF	(Turkey) Mustafa Kapı	-	-	2	-	2	0
7	FW	(Nigeria) Henry Onyekuru	17	6	2	-	19	6
8	MF	(Iceland) Birkir Bjarnason	8	-	3	-	11	0
10	MF	(Morocco) Younès Belhanda	17	6	-	-	17	6
11	MF	(Nigeria) David Akintola	17	3	1	1	18	4
15	DF	(North Macedonia) Jovan Manev	3	-	3	-	6	0
16	DF	(Turkey) İsmail Çokçalış	-	-	3	-	3	0
17	MF	(Senegal) Badou Ndiaye	19	5	1	-	20	5
18	GK	(Bosnia and Herzegovina) Goran Karačić	-	-	1	-	1	0
19	DF	(Turkey) Hıjran Alı Boyacı	-	-	-	-	0	0
20	MF	(Turkey) Emre Akbaba	14	3	1	-	15	3
21	FW	(North Macedonia) Arda Okan Kurtulan	-	-	1	-	1	0
22	DF	(Norway) Jonas Svensson	19	-	-	-	19	0
23	FW	(Norway) Fredrik Gulbrandsen	12	1	1	-	13	1
25	GK	(Turkey) Ertaç Özbir	19	-	1	-	20	0
26	MF	(Turkey) Yusuf Sari	18	2	2	2	20	4
27	FW	(Georgia (country)) Giorgi Khabuliani	-	-	-	-	0	0
28	FW	(Turkey) Salih Kavrazli	-	-	1	-	1	0
29	MF	(Mali) Mahamadou Ba	-	-	-	-	0	0
30	MF	(Turkey) Gökhan Töre	3	1	2	1	5	2
39	GK	(Turkey) Vedat Karakuş	-	-	1	-	1	0
46	FW	(Cameroon) Samuel Nongoh	-	-	1	-	1	0
50	MF	(England) Erhun Oztumer	4	-	3	3	7	3
77	DF	(Portugal) Kévin Rodrigues	18	2	1	-	19	2
88	MF	(Switzerland) Gökhan Inler	16	2	3	-	19	2
90	MF	(France) Benjamin Stambouli	17	-	1	-	18	0
91	DF	(Ivory Coast) Simon Deli	-	-	-	-	0	0
99	DF	(Turkey) Ata Öztürk	-	-	-	-	0	0
Player(s) transferred out but featured this season
2	DF	(Turkey) Tayyip Talha Sanuç	3	1	-	-	3	1
5	DF	(Turkey) Samet Akaydın	16	2	1	-	17	2
9	FW	(Democratic Republic of the Congo) Britt Assombalonga	12	2	2	4	14	6
24	FW	(Russia) Artem Dzyuba	4	1	1	-	5	1
44	DF	(Ukraine) Yaroslav Rakitskyi	8	-	1	-	9	0
45	FW	(Italy) Mario Balotelli	2	-	-	-	2	0
70	MF	(Turkey) Berk Yıldız	6	-	3	-	9	0

Last updated: 14 January 2023.
Source: FBref.com, ntvspor.net

=== Goalscorers ===
Rank	No.	Pos.	Player	Süper Lig	Turkish Cup	Total
1	10	MF	(Morocco) Younès Belhanda	12	0	12
2	29	FW	(Senegal) Cherif Ndiaye	8	0	8
2	7	FW	(Nigeria) Henry Onyekuru	8	0	8
2	17	MF	(Senegal) Badou Ndiaye	8	0	8
3	11	MF	(Nigeria) David Akintola	6	1	7
3	26	MF	(Turkey) Yusuf Sari	5	2	7
3	20	MF	(Turkey) Emre Akbaba	7	0	7
4	9	FW	(Democratic Republic of the Congo) Britt Assombalonga	2	4	6
5	50	MF	(England) Erhun Oztumer	0	3	3
6	5	DF	(Turkey) Samet Akaydın	2	0	2
6	88	MF	(Switzerland) Gökhan Inler	2	0	2
6	77	DF	(Portugal) Kévin Rodrigues	2	0	2
6	30	MF	(Turkey) Gökhan Töre	1	1	2
6	23	FW	(Norway) Fredrik Gulbrandsen	2	0	2
7	2	DF	(Turkey) Tayyip Talha Sanuç	1	0	1
7	24	FW	(Russia) Artem Dzyuba	1	0	1
16	Own goals			0	1	1
Totals				76	12	88

Last updated: 21 June 2023.
Source: FBref.com, ntvspor.net, mackolik
