= 2021–22 Adana Demirspor season =

Adana Demirspor
2021–22 season
- President: Murat Sancak
- Head coach: Vincenzo Montella
- Stadium: New Adana Stadium
- Süper Lig: 9th
- Turkish Cup: Round of 16
- Top goalscorer: League: Mario Balotelli (18); All: Mario Balotelli (19)
- Biggest win: Adana Demirspor 7–0 Göztepe
- Biggest defeat: Fatih Karagümrük 4–0 Adana Demirspor
Home colours	Away colours	Third colours

The 2021–22 season was the 82nd season in the history of Adana Demirspor and the first season back in the top tier of Turkish football, the Süper Lig. In addition to the domestic league, Adana Demirspor participated in this season's edition of the Turkish Cup.

== Players ==
=== First-team squad ===
As of 29 January 2022

Note: Flags indicate national team as defined under FIFA eligibility rules; some limited exceptions apply. Players may hold more than one non-FIFA nationality.

No.	Pos.	Nation	Player
2	DF	TUR	Tayyib Sanuç
4	DF	GER	Semih Güler
5	DF	TUR	Samet Akaydın
6	DF	TUR	Kaan Kanak
7	FW	COD	Britt Assombalonga
8	MF	GER	Sinan Kurt
9	FW	ITA	Mario Balotelli
10	MF	MAR	Younès Belhanda (3rd captain)
11	FW	NGR	David Akintola
17	FW	TUR	Metehan Mimaroğlu
18	MF	TUR	Mustafa Kapı
19	MF	ARG	Lucas Castro
20	DF	TUR	Tarık Çamdal
22	DF	NOR	Jonas Svensson
23	FW	TUR	Yunus Akgün (on loan from Galatasaray)
25	DF	TUR	Alper Uludağ

No.	Pos.	Nation	Player
30	MF	TUR	Emrecan Uzun
35	GK	TUR	Ferhat Kaplan
39	GK	TUR	Vedat Karakuş
49	GK	KOS	Arijanet Muric (on loan from Manchester City)
50	MF	ENG	Erhun Öztümer
59	FW	FRA	Loïc Rémy
66	DF	TUR	İsmail Çokçalış
67	MF	ISL	Birkir Bjarnason
70	FW	TUR	İsa Güler
77	FW	ARG	Matías Vargas (on loan from Espanyol)
80	MF	CRO	Damjan Đoković (on loan from Çaykur Rizespor)
88	MF	SUI	Gökhan Inler (Captain)
90	MF	FRA	Benjamin Stambouli
91	DF	CIV	Simon Deli
95	DF	SEN	Joher Rassoul (Vice-captain)

==== Out on loan ====
Note: Flags indicate national team as defined under FIFA eligibility rules; some limited exceptions apply. Players may hold more than one non-FIFA nationality.

No.	Pos.	Nation	Player
—	DF	TUR	Tolga Kalender (on loan to Bayrampaşa)
—	MF	TUR	Erkam Develi (on loan to Bayrampaşa)
—	MF	TUR	Burhan Ersoy (on loan to Bayrampaşa)
—	MF	TUR	Tayfun Aydoğan (on loan to Tuzlaspor)
—	MF	TUR	Sedat Sahintürk (on loan to Tuzlaspor)
—	MF	TUR	İzzet Çelik (on loan to Diyarbekirspor)
—	MF	GER	Bünyamin Balat (on loan to Denizlispor)

No.	Pos.	Nation	Player
—	FW	TUR	Mustafa Yılmaz (on loan to Bayrampaşa)
—	FW	TUR	Yiğit Gümüş (on loan to Bayrampaşa)
—	FW	TUR	Çağan Atik (on loan to Bayrampaşa)
—	FW	TUR	Musa Bulut (on loan to Niğde Anadolu)
—	FW	ITA	Enock Barwuah (on loan to Menemenspor)
—	FW	NGR	Francis Ezeh (on loan to Tuzlaspor)

== Competitions ==
=== Overall record ===
Competition	First match	Last match	Starting round	Final position	Record							
Competition	First match	Last match	Starting round	Final position	Pld	W	D	L	GF	GA	GD	Win %
Süper Lig	15 August 2021	22 May 2022	Matchday 1	9th	38	15	10	13	60	47	+13	39.47
Turkish Cup	28 October 2021	10 February 2022	Third round	Round of 16	4	3	1	0	12	3	+9	75.00
Total					42	18	11	13	72	50	+22	42.86

Source: Soccerway

=== Süper Lig ===
==== League table ====
Pos	Team	Pld	W	D	L	GF	GA	GD	Pts	Qualification or relegation
7	Antalyaspor	38	16	11	11	54	47	+7	59 (Note: Beşiktaş finished ahead of Antalyaspor on head-to-head points: Antalyaspor 2–3 Beşiktaş, Beşiktaş 0–0 Antalyaspor.)	
8	Fatih Karagümrük	38	16	9	13	47	52	−5	57	
9	Adana Demirspor	38	15	10	13	60	47	+13	55	
10	Sivasspor	38	14	12	12	52	50	+2	54	Qualification for the Europa League play-off round (Note: Sivasspor qualified for the Europa League play-off round as the 2021–22 Turkish Cup winners.)
11	Kasımpaşa	38	15	8	15	67	57	+10	53 (Note: Kasımpaşa finished ahead of Hatayspor on head-to-head points: Hatayspor 1–1 Kasımpaşa, Kasımpaşa 3–1 Hatayspor.)	

Source: Süper Lig
Rules for classification: 1) Points; 2) Head-to-head points; 3) Head-to-head goal difference; 4) Head-to-head goals scored; 5) Goal difference; 6) Goals scored; 7) Play-off.

==== Results summary ====
Overall								Home						Away					
Pld	W	D	L	GF	GA	GD	Pts	W	D	L	GF	GA	GD	W	D	L	GF	GA	GD
38	15	10	13	60	47	+13	55	9	5	5	35	17	+18	6	5	8	25	30	−5

Source: Spor Toto Süper Lig

==== Results by round ====
Round	1	2	3	4	5	6	7	8	9	10	11	12	13	14	15	16	17	18	19	20	21	22	23	24	25	26	27	28	29	30	31	32	33	34	35	36	37	38
Ground	H	A	H	A	H	A	H	A	H	A	A	H	A	H	A	H	A	H	A	A	H	A	H	A	H	A	H	A	H	H	A	H	A	H	A	H	A	H
Result	L	D	D	L	W	D	W	W	L	D	L	W	W	D	L	W	W	W	D	W	D	L	W	W	D	W	D	L	L	W	D	W	L	L	L	L	L	W
Position	14	13	15	17	15	13	12	10	10	10	12	10	10	9	10	8	7	5	6	4	5	8	4	3	4	4	5	6	7	5	6	5	5	5	8	9	9	9

Updated to match(es) played on 14 February 2022. Source: Spor Toto Süper Lig
A = Away; H = Home; W = Win; D = Draw; L = Loss

==== Matches ====
15 August 2021 1	Adana Demirspor	0–1	Fenerbahçe	Adana
21:45 TRT (UTC+3)	Sanuç (yellow card) 90+1'	Report	Tisserand (yellow card) 31'; Özil 46'; Osayi-Samuel (yellow card) 82'	Stadium: New Adana Stadium; Attendance: 10,340; Referee: Ali Şansalan

20 August 2021 2	Kayserispor	1–1	Adana Demirspor	Kayseri
20:30 TRT (UTC+3)	Sazdağı 17'; Akdağ (yellow card) 45+3'	Report	Kaplan (yellow card) 39'; Svensson (yellow card) 41'; Güler (yellow card) 42'; David (yellow card) 45+2'; David 63'; Ezeh (yellow card) 80'; Stambouli (yellow card) 85'	Stadium: Kadir Has Stadium; Referee: Tugay Kaan Numanoğlu

27 August 2021 3	Adana Demirspor	1–1	Konyaspor	Adana
21:45 TRT (UTC+3)	Assombalonga 59'	Report	Gürler (yellow card) 53'; Bardakcı (yellow card) 66'; Bardakcı 83'; Demirbağ (yellow card) 90+2'	Stadium: New Adana Stadium; Referee: Alper Ulusoy

11 September 2021 4	Fatih Karagümrük	4–0	Adana Demirspor	Istanbul
--:-- TRT (UTC+3)				Stadium: Atatürk Olympic Stadium

18 September 2021 5	Adana Demirspor	3–1	Çaykur Rizespor	Adana
--:-- TRT (UTC+3)				Stadium: New Adana Stadium

21 September 2021 6	Beşiktaş	3–3	Adana Demirspor	Istanbul
--:-- TRT (UTC+3)				Stadium: Vodafone Park

25 September 2021 7	Adana Demirspor	4–0	Gaziantep	Adana
--:-- TRT (UTC+3)				Stadium: New Adana Stadium

1 October 2021 8	Antalyaspor	1–2	Adana Demirspor	Antalya
--:-- TRT (UTC+3)				Stadium: Antalya Stadium

16 October 2021 9	Adana Demirspor	0–2	Yeni Malatyaspor	Adana
--:-- TRT (UTC+3)				Stadium: New Adana Stadium

24 October 2021 10	Sivasspor	1–1	Adana Demirspor	Sivas
--:-- TRT (UTC+3)				Stadium: New Sivas 4 Eylül Stadium

1 November 2021 11	İstanbul Başakşehir	2–1	Adana Demirspor	Istanbul 9
20:00 TRT (UTC+3)	Kaldırım (yellow card) 41'; Chadli 71'; Višća 90+2' (pen.)	Report	Assombalonga 60'; Inler (yellow card) 90+7'	Stadium: Başakşehir Fatih Terim Stadium; Attendance: 927; Referee: Arda Kardeşler

7 November 2021 12	Adana Demirspor	1–0	Hatayspor	Adana
--:-- TRT (UTC+3)				Stadium: New Adana Stadium

21 November 2021 13	Altay	1–3	Adana Demirspor	İzmir
--:-- TRT (UTC+3)				Stadium: Alsancak Mustafa Denizli Stadium

26 November 2021 14	Adana Demirspor	0–0	Kasımpaşa	Adana
--:-- TRT (UTC+3)				Stadium: New Adana Stadium

4 December 2021 15	Trabzonspor	2–0	Adana Demirspor	Trabzon
16:00	Nwakaeme 26'; Hamšík 54'	Report	Balotelli (yellow card) 82'	Stadium: Şenol Güneş Stadium; Referee: Fırat Aydınus

12 December 2021 16	Adana Demirspor	1–0	Giresunspor	Adana
--:-- TRT (UTC+3)				Stadium: New Adana Stadium

18 December 2021 17	Alanyaspor	1–3	Adana Demirspor	Alanya
--:-- TRT (UTC+3)				Stadium: Bahçeşehir Okulları Stadium

21 December 2021 18	Adana Demirspor	2–0	Galatasaray	Sarıçam, Adana
20:00	Stambouli (yellow card) 8'; Bjarnason (yellow card) 43'; Akgün 53', 58'; Muric (yellow card) 86'	Report	Cicâldău (yellow card) 2'; Antalyalı (yellow card) 32'	Stadium: New Adana Stadium; Attendance: 24,126; Referee: Arda Kardeşler

26 December 2021 19	Göztepe	1–1	Adana Demirspor	İzmir
--:-- TRT (UTC+3)				Stadium: Gürsel Aksel Stadium

10 January 2022 20	Fenerbahçe	1–2	Adana Demirspor	Istanbul
20:00 TRT (UTC+3)	Valencia 29' (pen.); Yandaş (yellow card) 47'; Osayi-Samuel (yellow card) 90+2'	Report	Svensson (yellow card) 27'; Inler 34'; Stambouli (yellow card) 40'; Belhanda 46', (yellow card) 47'	Stadium: Şükrü Saracoğlu Stadium; Attendance: 14,791; Referee: Halil Umut Meler

15 January 2022 21	Adana Demirspor	1–1	Kayserispor	Adana
--:-- TRT (UTC+3)				Stadium: New Adana Stadium

18 January 2022 22	Konyaspor	1–0	Adana Demirspor	Konya
--:-- TRT (UTC+3)				Stadium: Konya Metropolitan Municipality Stadium

22 January 2022 23	Adana Demirspor	5–0	Fatih Karagümrük	Adana
--:-- TRT (UTC+3)				Stadium: New Adana Stadium

6 February 2022 24	Çaykur Rizespor	1–3	Adana Demirspor	Rize
--:-- TRT (UTC+3)				Stadium: Yeni Rize Şehir Stadı

14 February 2022 25	Adana Demirspor	1–1	Beşiktaş	Adana
--:-- TRT (UTC+3)				Stadium: New Adana Stadium

20 February 2022 26	Gaziantep	0–3	Adana Demirspor	Gaziantep
--:-- TRT (UTC+3)				Stadium: Gaziantep Stadium

25 February 2022 27	Adana Demirspor	0–0	Antalyaspor	Adana
--:-- TRT (UTC+3)				Stadium: New Adana Stadium

4 March 2022 28	Yeni Malatyaspor	1–0	Adana Demirspor	Malatya
--:-- TRT (UTC+3)				Stadium: New Malatya Stadium

13 March 2022 29	Adana Demirspor	2–3	Sivasspor	Adana
--:-- TRT (UTC+3)				Stadium: New Adana Stadium

19 March 2022 30	Adana Demirspor	2–1	İstanbul Başakşehir	Adana
--:-- TRT (UTC+3)		Report		Stadium: New Adana Stadium

4 April 2022 31	Hatayspor	0–0	Adana Demirspor	Antakya
--:-- TRT (UTC+3)				Stadium: New Hatay Stadium

10 April 2022 32	Adana Demirspor	3–1	Altay	Adana
--:-- TRT (UTC+3)				Stadium: New Adana Stadium

17 April 2022 33	Kasımpaşa	4–0	Adana Demirspor	Istanbul
--:-- TRT (UTC+3)				Stadium: Recep Tayyip Erdoğan Stadium

23 April 2022 34	Adana Demirspor	1–3	Trabzonspor	Adana
20:30 TRT (UTC+3)	Vargas 75'		Bruno Peres 7' (pen.); Cornelius 12'; Djaniny 61'	Stadium: New Adana Stadium

29 April 2022 35	Giresunspor	2–0	Adana Demirspor	Giresun
20:30 TRT (UTC+3)	Nayir 21'; Serginho 48'			Stadium: Çotanak Sports Complex

7 May 2022 36	Adana Demirspor	1–2	Alanyaspor	Adana
19:00 TRT (UTC+3)	Belhanda 32'		Sanuç 19' (o.g.); Akbaba 76'	Stadium: New Adana Stadium

16 May 2022 37	Galatasaray	3–2	Adana Demirspor	Sarıyer, Istanbul
20:00 TRT (UTC+3)	Gomis 30' (pen.), 63'; Aktürkoğlu 55'	Report	Akgün 9'; Balotelli 67'	Stadium: Nef Stadium; Referee: Saper Barış Saka

22 May 2022 38	Adana Demirspor	7–0	Göztepe	Adana
19:00 TRT (UTC+3)	Çankaya 25' (o.g.); Balotelli 33', 36', 44', 61', 70'; Oztumer 45'			Stadium: New Adana Stadium; Referee: Adem Cinek

=== Turkish Cup ===
28 October 2021 Third round	Adana Demirspor	3–0	Niğde Anadolu	Adana
20:45 TRT (UTC+3)	Belhanda 11' (yellow card) 56'; Castro (yellow card) 45+1'; Assombalonga 69', 80'; Ezeh (yellow card) 74'	Report	Yılmaztürk (yellow card) 75'	Stadium: New Adana Stadium; Referee: Emre Kargın

30 November 2021 Fourth round	Adana Demirspor	5–0	Serik Belediyespor	Adana
19:00 TRT (UTC+3)	Balotelli 10'; Akgün 14'; Bjarnason 26', 33'; Mimaroğlu 41'	Report	Göksel (yellow card) 39'	Stadium: New Adana Stadium; Referee: Alper Akarsu

29 December 2021 Fifth round	Adana Demirspor	3–2	Ankaraspor	Adana
17:00 TRT (UTC+3)	David 11'; Karakuş (yellow card) 30'; Akaydin 67'; Mimaroğlu 89'	Report	Fıstıkcı 14'; Yemişçi 30'	Stadium: New Adana Stadium; Referee: Bülent Birincioğlu

10 February 2022 Round of 16	Alanyaspor	1–1 (a.e.t.) (4–2 p)	Adana Demirspor	Antalya
17:30 TRT (UTC+3)	Eduardo 22'; Candeias (yellow card) 90'; Aksoy (yellow card) 104'; Bekiroğlu (penalty missed) 105+4'; Güneş (yellow card) 110'	Report	Öztümer 38'; Sanuç (yellow card) 45+2'	Stadium: Bahçeşehir Okulları Stadium; Referee: Ümit Öztürk
	Penalties
	Eduardo (penalty scored); Candeias (penalty scored); Milunović (penalty missed); Akbaba (penalty scored); Novais (penalty scored)		(penalty scored) Assombalonga; (penalty missed) Güler; (penalty scored) Inler; (penalty missed) Vargas
