= 2023–24 Alanyaspor season =

Alanyaspor
2023–24 season
- President: Hasan Çavuşoğlu
- Head coach: Ömer Erdoğan (until 29 October); Fatih Tekke (from 3 November)
- Stadium: Kırbıyık Holding Stadium
- Süper Lig: 7th
- Turkish Cup: Fifth round
- Top goalscorer: League: Oğuz Aydın (13); All: Oğuz Aydın (13)
colours	Away colours	Third colours

The 2023–24 season was Alanyaspor's 76th season in existence and eighth consecutive in the Süper Lig. They also competed in the Turkish Cup.

== Players ==
=== First-team squad ===
As of 9 February 2024

Note: Flags indicate national team as defined under FIFA eligibility rules; some limited exceptions apply. Players may hold more than one non-FIFA nationality.

No.	Pos.	Nation	Player
1	GK	TUR	Ertuğrul Taşkıran
2	DF	POR	Nuno Lima
4	DF	TUR	Furkan Bayır
5	DF	KOS	Fidan Aliti
7	FW	TUR	Efecan Karaca (captain)
8	MF	NED	Leroy Fer
10	MF	POR	João Novais
11	MF	TUR	Oğuz Aydın
16	FW	KOR	Hwang Ui-jo (on loan from Nottingham Forest)
17	MF	FRA	Nicolas Janvier
18	MF	DEN	Pione Sisto
20	DF	TUR	Fatih Aksoy
22	FW	EGY	Ahmed Hassan

No.	Pos.	Nation	Player
25	MF	BRA	Richard
26	MF	TUR	Eren Altıntaş
27	MF	ANG	Loide Augusto
28	FW	BRA	Carlos Eduardo
29	DF	SLO	Jure Balkovec
33	FW	BRA	Anderson Silva
35	GK	TUR	Yavuz Aygün
37	MF	GER	Mert Yusuf Torlak
42	DF	BEL	Yunus Bahadır
88	MF	TUR	Yusuf Özdemir
94	DF	KOS	Florent Hadergjonaj
99	GK	TUR	Yusuf Karagöz

=== Other players under contract ===
Note: Flags indicate national team as defined under FIFA eligibility rules; some limited exceptions apply. Players may hold more than one non-FIFA nationality.

No. / Pos. / Nation / Player; — / GK / TUR / Çağrı Güney	No. / Pos. / Nation / Player; 61 / DF / TUR / Emre Bekir

=== Out on loan ===
Note: Flags indicate national team as defined under FIFA eligibility rules; some limited exceptions apply. Players may hold more than one non-FIFA nationality.

No.	Pos.	Nation	Player
—	GK	TUR	Musa Koç (at Karaman FK until 30 June 2024)
—	DF	ROU	Ümit Akdağ (at Göztepe until 30 June 2024)
—	DF	TUR	Çağan Kayra Erciyas (at Fethiyespor until 30 June 2024)
—	DF	TUR	Eray Güneş (at Afyonspor until 30 June 2024)
—	DF	TUR	Hamza Özdemir (at Batman Petrolspor until 30 June 2024)
—	MF	TUR	Buluthan Bulut (at Alanya Kestelspor until 30 June 2024)
—	MF	TUR	Emirhan Çavuş (at Erbaaspor until 30 June 2024)
—	MF	TUR	Cem Çelik (at Diyarbekirspor until 30 June 2024)

No.	Pos.	Nation	Player
—	MF	COD	Arnaud Lusamba (at Pendikspor until 30 June 2024)
—	MF	TUR	Emin Sarıgül (at Afjet Afyonspor until 30 June 2024)
—	MF	TUR	İsmail Zehir (at Düzcespor until 30 June 2024)
—	FW	TUR	Osman Arslantaş (at Bulvarspor until 30 June 2024)
—	FW	TUR	Onur Demir (at Nazilli Belediyespor until 30 June 2024)
—	FW	MTN	El Mami Tetah (at Arda Kardzhali until 30 June 2024)
—	FW	TUR	Veysel Ünal (at Turgutluspor until 30 June 2024)
—	FW	VEN	Sergio Córdova (at Sochi until 30 June 2024)

== Transfers ==
=== In ===
Pos.	Player	Transferred from	Fee	Date	Source
FW	(Brazil) Carlos Eduardo	(Brazil) Palmeiras	Undisclosed	3 July 2023	
DF	(Brazil) Eduardo Bauermann	(Brazil) Santos	Free	3 July 2023	
MF	(Brazil) Richard	(Brazil) Ceará	Undisclosed	3 July 2023	
FW	(France) Nicolas Janvier	(Portugal) Vitória de Guimarães	Undisclosed	4 July 2023	
FW	(Angola) Loide Augusto	(Portugal) Mafra	Undisclosed	4 July 2023	
GK	(Turkey) Ertuğrul Taşkıran	(Turkey) Kasımpaşa	Free	4 July 2023	
MF	(Portugal) João Novais	(United Arab Emirates) Al-Bataeh		11 July 2023	
DF	(Kosovo) Florent Hadergjonaj	(Turkey) Kasımpaşa	Free	7 August 2023	
DF	(Portugal) Nuno Lima	(Portugal) Paços de Ferreira	Undisclosed	14 September 2023	
FW	(Denmark) Pione Sisto	(Denmark) Midtjylland	Free	14 September 2023	
FW	(South Korea) Hwang Ui-jo	(England) Nottingham Forest	Loan	6 February 2024	
FW	(Egypt) Ahmed Hassan	(Turkey) Pendikspor	Undisclosed	9 February 2024	

=== Out ===
Pos.	Player	Transferred to	Fee	Date	Source
GK	(Turkey) İsmail Ünal		Free	1 July 2023	
MF	(Portugal) Daniel Candeias		Free	1 July 2023	
MF	(Netherlands) Leroy Fer		Free	1 July 2023	
DF	(Morocco) Zouhair Feddal		Free	1 July 2023	
FW	(Senegal) Famara Diédhiou	(Spain) Granada	€500,000	1 July 2023	
DF	(Brazil) Eduardo Bauermann	Released		8 September 2023	

== Pre-season and friendlies ==
Win Draw Loss

13 July 2023 Friendly	Alanyaspor (Turkey)	3–1	(Turkey) Çaykur Rizespor	Erzurum
15:15 TRT (UTC+3)	Balkovec 6'; Richard 29'; Aydın 32'	Report	Papa 58'	Stadium: Yüksek İrtifa Kamp Ve Merkezi 3 Nolu Saha

18 July 2023 Friendly	Alanyaspor (Turkey)	3–1	(Turkey) Konyaspor	Erzurum
17:00 TRT (UTC+3)	Aydın 65', 76'; 85' (o.g.)	Report	Cikalleshi 58' (pen.)	Stadium: Yüksek İrtifa Kamp Merkezi

20 July 2023 Friendly	Antalyaspor (Turkey)	2–1	(Turkey) Alanyaspor	Erzurum
17:00 TRT (UTC+3)	Vural 48'; Rakip 90'	Report	Aydın 46'	Stadium: Yüksek İrtifa Kamp Merkezi

1 August 2023 Friendly	Volendam (Netherlands)	1–1	(Turkey) Alanyaspor	Alkmaar, Netherlands
18:30 CEST (UTC+2)	Twigt 11'		Karaca 33' (pen.)	Stadium: Sportpark Overdie

4 August 2023 Friendly	NAC Breda (Netherlands)	1–1	(Turkey) Alanyaspor
19:30 CEST (UTC+2)

18 January 2024 Friendly	Alanyaspor (Turkey)	0–1	Tajikistan U23
			Ashurmamadov

== Competitions ==
=== Overall record ===
Competition	First match	Last match	Starting round	Final position	Record							
Competition	First match	Last match	Starting round	Final position	Pld	W	D	L	GF	GA	GD	Win %
Süper Lig	14 August 2023	24 May 2024	Matchday 1	7th	38	12	16	10	53	50	+3	31.58
Turkish Cup	31 October 2023	17 January 2024	Third round	Fifth round	3	2	0	1	6	4	+2	66.67
Total					41	14	16	11	59	54	+5	34.15

Source: Soccerway

=== Süper Lig ===
==== League table ====
Pos	Team	Pld	W	D	L	GF	GA	GD	Pts	Qualification or relegation
6	Beşiktaş	38	16	8	14	52	47	+5	56 (Note: Kasımpaşa are ahead of Beşiktaş on head-to-head points: Kasımpaşa 2–1 Beşiktaş, Beşiktaş 1–3 Kasımpaşa.)	Qualification for the Europa League play-off round (Note: The 2023–24 Turkish Cup winners (Beşiktaş) qualify for the Europa League play-off round.)
7	Sivasspor	38	14	12	12	47	54	−7	54	
8	Alanyaspor	38	12	16	10	53	50	+3	52	
9	Rizespor	38	14	8	16	48	58	−10	50	
10	Antalyaspor	38	12	13	13	44	49	−5	49	

Source: Süper Lig
Rules for classification: 1) Points; 2) Head-to-head points; 3) Head-to-head goal difference; 4) Head-to-head goals scored; 5) Goal difference; 6) Goals scored; 7) Play-off.

==== Results summary ====
Overall								Home						Away					
Pld	W	D	L	GF	GA	GD	Pts	W	D	L	GF	GA	GD	W	D	L	GF	GA	GD
38	12	16	10	53	50	+3	52	7	8	4	32	26	+6	5	8	6	21	24	−3

Source: Trendyol Süper Lig

==== Results by round ====
Round	1	2	3	4	5	6
Ground	H	A	H	A	H	H
Result	W	D	D	D	D	L
Position	2	4	5	8	9	

Updated to match(es) played on 24 September 2023. Source: Trendyol Süper Lig
A = Away; H = Home; W = Win; D = Draw; L = Loss

==== Matches ====
The league fixtures were unveiled on 19 July 2023.

14 August 2023 1	Alanyaspor	2–0	İstanbul Başakşehir	Alanya
21:00 TRT (UTC+3)	Aliti (yellow card) 8'; Richard (yellow card) 15'; Karaca (yellow card) 35'; Bayır (yellow card) 35'; Novais 45+4'; Özdemir (yellow card) 56'; Carlos Eduardo 90+6'	Report	Pelkas (yellow card) 5'; Figueiredo (yellow card) 45+6' (yellow-red card) 77'; Aleksić (yellow card) 90+2'	Stadium: Kırbıyık Holding Stadium; Attendance: 3,030; Referee: Tugay Kaan Numanoğlu

19 August 2023 2	Çaykur Rizespor	0–0	Alanyaspor	Rize
19:15 TRT (UTC+3)	Olawoyin (yellow card) 69'; Korkmaz (yellow card) 74'; Yaşar (yellow card) 87'	Report	Özdemir (yellow card) 40'; Richard (yellow card) 45+2'; Augusto (yellow card) 64'; Aydın (red card) 67'	Stadium: City of Rize Stadium; Attendance: 3,431; Referee: Yiğit Arslan

27 August 2023 3	Alanyaspor	0–0	Hatayspor	Alanya
21:45 TRT (UTC+3)		Report		Stadium: Alanya Stadium; Attendance: 3,132; Referee: Direnç Tonusluoğlu

2 September 2023 4	Pendikspor	1–1	Alanyaspor	Istanbul
19:15 TRT (UTC+3)	Sülüngöz 90+3'	Report	Augusto 88'	Stadium: Ümraniye Municipality City Stadium; Attendance: 854; Referee: Abdulkadir Bitigen

17 September 2023 5	Alanyaspor	3–3	Kasımpaşa	Alanya
20:00 TRT (UTC+3)	Sergio Córdova 18'; Novais 24', 51'	Report	Fall 45+2'; Kara 79'; Ben Ouanes 87'	Stadium: Alanya Stadium; Referee: Turgut Doman

24 September 2023 6	Alanyaspor	0–1	Fenerbahçe	Alanya
20:00 TRT (UTC+3)	Richard (yellow card) 40'; Anderson (yellow card) 90+8'	Report	Džeko (yellow card) 21'; Kahveci (yellow card) 34', (goal) 43'; Kadioglu (yellow card) 66'; Tadić (yellow card) 75'; Batshuayi (yellow card) 85'; Djiku (yellow card) 88'	Stadium: Alanya Stadium; Referee: Atilla Karaoğlan

1 October 2023 7	Adana Demirspor	4–0	Alanyaspor	Adana
19:00 TRT (UTC+3)	Balotelli 30', 47'; Özbir (yellow card) 45'; Belhanda 71'; Aydoğan 87'; Niang (yellow card) 90+1'	Report	Augusto (yellow card) 24'; Novais (yellow card) 48'; Carlos Eduardo (yellow card) 45'	Stadium: New Adana Stadium; Referee: Ali Şansalan

6 October 2023 8	Alanyaspor	2–1	Fatih Karagümrük	Alanya
				Stadium: Alanya Stadium

23 October 2023 9	Trabzonspor	1–0	Alanyaspor	Trabzon
				Stadium: Şenol Güneş Sports Complex

28 October 2023 10	Alanyaspor	1–2	Sivasspor	Alanya
16:00 TRT	Aksoy 66'		Květ 90+3'; Manaj 90+7'	Stadium: Alanya Stadium; Referee: Mert Güzenge

6 November 2023 11	Kayserispor	1–0	Alanyaspor	Kayseri
20:00 TRT (UTC+3)				Stadium: Kadir Has Stadium

11 November 2023 12	Alanyaspor	0–3	Gaziantep	Alanya
16:00 TRT (UTC+3)				Stadium: Alanya Stadium

25 November 2023 13	Galatasaray	4–0	Alanyaspor	Istanbul
19:00 TRT (UTC+3)				Stadium: Rams Park

2 December 2023 14	Alanyaspor	2–2	Konyaspor	Alanya
13:30 TRT (UTC+3)				Stadium: Alanya Stadium

10 December 2023 15	İstanbulspor	0–1	Alanyaspor	Istanbul
13:30 TRT (UTC+3)				Stadium: Esenyurt Necmi Kadıoğlu Stadium

21 December 2023 17	Beşiktaş	1–3	Alanyaspor	Istanbul
20:00 TRT (UTC+3)				Stadium: Beşiktaş Stadium

25 December 2023 18	Alanyaspor	3–1	Samsunspor	Alanya
17:00 TRT (UTC+3)				Stadium: Alanya Stadium

5 January 2024 19	Antalyaspor	0–0	Alanyaspor	Antalya
20:00 TRT (UTC+3)				Stadium: Antalya Stadium

9 January 2024 16	Alanyaspor	1–1	Ankaragücü	Alanya
17:00 TRT (UTC+3)				Stadium: Alanya Stadium

13 January 2024 20	İstanbul Başakşehir	3–2	Alanyaspor	Istanbul
16:00 TRT (UTC+3)				Stadium: Başakşehir Fatih Terim Stadium

4 February 2024 24	Kasımpaşa	2–1	Alanyaspor	Istanbul
16:00 TRT (UTC+3)	Gül 36'; Fall 59'		Porozo 28' (o.g.); Richard (yellow card) 53'; Bayır (yellow card) 90+4'; Fer (yellow card) 90+4'; Balkovec (yellow card) 90+5'	Stadium: Recep Tayyip Erdoğan Stadium; Referee: Oğuzhan Çakır

11 February 2024 25	Fenerbahçe	2–2	Alanyaspor	Istanbul
19:00	Szymański (yellow card) 9'; Tadić (yellow card) 42', (goal) 49' (pen.); Ünder (yellow card) 45+5'; Džeko 59'		Carlos Eduardo (yellow card) 4'; Fer (yellow card) 5'; Loide Augusto 12', 63', (yellow card) 45+5'; Aydın (yellow card) 44'; Richard (yellow card) 85'	Stadium: Şükrü Saracoğlu Stadium; Referee: Çağdaş Altay

18 February 2024 26	Alanyaspor	3–3	Adana Demirspor	Alanya
13:30	Sisto (yellow card) 13'; Balkovec 20', (yellow card) 90+7'; Aydın 33'; João Novais (penalty missed) 76', (yellow card) 81'; Hadergjonaj 76'; Aliti (yellow card) 90+6'		Akbaba 67' (pen.); Sarı 69', 90+7'; Karakuş (yellow card) 75'	Stadium: Alanya Oba Stadium; Referee: Bahattin Şimşek

25 February 2024 27	Fatih Karagümrük	v	Alanyaspor	Istanbul
16:00				Stadium: Atatürk Olympic Stadium

=== Turkish Cup ===
31 October 2023 Third round	Alanyaspor	4–1	Kutahyaspor	Alanya
19:00	Sisto 27'; Janvier 34'; Anderson 43', 80'		Kök 63'	Stadium: Alanya Oba Stadium; Referee: Alper Akarsu

5 December 2023 Fourth round	Alanyaspor	1–0	Kocaelispor	Alanya
21:00	Balkovec 23'			Stadium: Alanya Oba Stadium; Referee: Ali Yılmaz

17 January 2024 Fifth round	Alanyaspor	1–3 (a.e.t.)	Samsunspor	Alanya
17:00	Altıntaş 16'		Gümüşkaya 73'; Aydoğdu 91'; Özbaskıcı 120+1'	Stadium: Alanya Oba Stadium; Referee: Alper Akarsu
