= Boyacı =

Boyacı (IPA: [bojaˈdʒɯ], literally "painter") is a Turkish occupational surname and may refer to:

- Ayşe Beril Boyacı (born 2008), Turkish judoka
- Aysun Boyacı (born 1972), Turkish football player
- Hıjran Alı Boyacı (2005), Turkish football player
- Sümeyye Boyacı (born 2003), Turkish Paralympic swimmer

== See also ==
- Boyacı Mosque
- Boyacı, Bismil
- Boyacı, Mecitözü
