= 2019–20 in Turkish football =

Football in Turkey
- Season: 2019–20

Men's football
- Süper Lig: İstanbul Başakşehir
- First League: Hatayspor
- Turkish Cup: Trabzonspor
- Turkish Super Cup: Galatasaray

The 2019–20 season was the 115th season of competitive football in Turkey.

== Pre-season ==
| League | Promoted to league | Relegated from league |
|---|---|---|
| Süper Lig | Denizlispor; Gençlerbirliği; Gazişehir Gaziantep FK | Bursaspor; BB Erzurumspor; Akhisarspor |
| 1.Lig | Keçiörengücü; Menemen Belediyespor; Fatih Karagümrük | Afjet Afyonspor; Elazığspor; Kardemir Karabükspor |
| 2.Lig | Hekimoğlu Trabzon; Ergene Velimeşespor; Kırşehir Belediyespor; Van Büyükşehir Belediyespor; Bayburt Özel İdarespor; Yeni Çorumspor | Bayrampaşa; Manisaspor; Gaziantepspor; Fethiyespor; Tokatspor; Darıca Gençlerbirliği |
| 3.Lig | Ağrı 1970 Spor; Malatya Yeşilyurt Belediyespor; Kelkit Belediyespor; Yozgatspor; Aksaray Belediyespor; Somaspor; Belediye Derincespor; Alemdağspor; Modafen FK | Gebzespor; Körfez SK; Adıyaman 1954 Spor; Alibeyköyspor; Bergama Belediyespor; 1461 Trabzon; Bağcılar SK; Bucaspor |

== League tables ==
=== Süper Lig ===
| Pos | Team | Pld | W | D | L | GF | GA | GD | Pts | Qualification or relegation |
|---|---|---|---|---|---|---|---|---|---|---|
| 1 | İstanbul Başakşehir (C) | 34 | 20 | 9 | 5 | 65 | 34 | +31 | 69 | Qualification for the Champions League group stage |
| 2 | Trabzonspor (Note: Trabzonspor were banned for 1 season from all UEFA club competitions for either the 2020–21 or 2021–22 seasons by the UEFA Club Financial Control Body on 3 June 2020 due to breaches of the UEFA Financial Fair Play Regulations.) | 34 | 18 | 11 | 5 | 76 | 42 | +34 | 65 | |
| 3 | Beşiktaş | 34 | 19 | 5 | 10 | 59 | 40 | +19 | 62 | Qualification for the Champions League second qualifying round |
| 4 | Sivasspor | 34 | 17 | 9 | 8 | 55 | 38 | +17 | 60 | Qualification for the Europa League group stage |
| 5 | Alanyaspor | 34 | 16 | 9 | 9 | 61 | 37 | +24 | 57 | Qualification for the Europa League third qualifying round |
| 6 | Galatasaray | 34 | 15 | 11 | 8 | 55 | 37 | +18 | 56 | Qualification for the Europa League second qualifying round |
| 7 | Fenerbahçe | 34 | 15 | 8 | 11 | 58 | 46 | +12 | 53 | |
| 8 | Gaziantep | 34 | 11 | 13 | 10 | 49 | 50 | −1 | 46 | |
| 9 | Antalyaspor | 34 | 11 | 12 | 11 | 41 | 52 | −11 | 45 | |
| 10 | Kasımpaşa | 34 | 12 | 7 | 15 | 53 | 58 | −5 | 43 | |
| 11 | Göztepe | 34 | 11 | 9 | 14 | 44 | 49 | −5 | 42 | |
| 12 | Gençlerbirliği | 34 | 9 | 9 | 16 | 39 | 56 | −17 | 36 (Note: Head-to-head points: Gençlerbirliği 4, Konyaspor 1) | |
| 13 | Konyaspor | 34 | 8 | 12 | 14 | 36 | 52 | −16 | 36 | |
| 14 | Denizlispor | 34 | 9 | 8 | 17 | 31 | 48 | −17 | 35 (Note: Head-to-head points: Denizlispor 4, Rizespor 1) | |
| 15 | Rizespor | 34 | 10 | 5 | 19 | 38 | 57 | −19 | 35 | |
| 16 | Yeni Malatyaspor | 34 | 8 | 8 | 18 | 44 | 51 | −7 | 32 (Note: Head-to-head points: Yeni Malatyaspor 6, Kayserispor 5, Ankaragücü 5. Head-to-head goal difference: Yeni Malatyaspor +6, Kayserispor -3, Ankaragücü -3. Head-to-head goals scored: Yeni Malatyaspor 9, Kayserispor 4, Ankaragücü 3.) | |
| 17 | Kayserispor | 34 | 8 | 8 | 18 | 40 | 72 | −32 | 32 | |
| 18 | Ankaragücü | 34 | 7 | 11 | 16 | 31 | 56 | −25 | 32 | |

Source: Süper Lig, Soccerway
Rules for classification: 1) Points; 2) Head-to-head points; 3) Head-to-head goal difference; 4) Head-to-head goals scored; 5) Goal difference; 6) Goals scored; 7) Play-off.
(C) Champions

=== 1.Lig ===
| Pos | Team | Pld | W | D | L | GF | GA | GD | Pts | Qualification or relegation |
|---|---|---|---|---|---|---|---|---|---|---|
| 1 | Hatayspor (C, P) | 34 | 19 | 9 | 6 | 48 | 28 | +20 | 66 | Promotion to the Süper Lig |
| 2 | BB Erzurumspor (P) | 34 | 18 | 8 | 8 | 41 | 25 | +16 | 62 | Promotion to the Süper Lig |
| 3 | Adana Demirspor | 34 | 17 | 10 | 7 | 68 | 44 | +24 | 61 | Qualification for the Süper Lig Playoffs |
| 4 | Akhisarspor | 34 | 16 | 9 | 9 | 46 | 39 | +7 | 57 | Qualification for the Süper Lig Playoffs |
| 5 | Fatih Karagümrük (P) | 34 | 15 | 11 | 8 | 53 | 39 | +14 | 56 | Qualification for the Süper Lig Playoffs |
| 6 | Bursaspor (Note: Bursaspor have been deducted 3 points.) | 34 | 17 | 8 | 9 | 49 | 41 | +8 | 56 | Qualification for the Süper Lig Playoffs |
| 7 | Altay | 34 | 14 | 12 | 8 | 45 | 37 | +8 | 54 | |
| 8 | Keçiörengücü | 34 | 13 | 11 | 10 | 33 | 28 | +5 | 50 | |
| 9 | Menemenspor | 34 | 11 | 11 | 12 | 42 | 46 | −4 | 44 (Note: Head-to-head points: Menemenspor 7, Giresunspor 6, Ümraniyespor 4) | |
| 10 | Giresunspor | 34 | 12 | 8 | 14 | 40 | 47 | −7 | 44 | |
| 11 | Ümraniyespor | 34 | 12 | 8 | 14 | 48 | 51 | −3 | 44 | |
| 12 | İstanbulspor | 34 | 9 | 13 | 12 | 45 | 43 | +2 | 40 | |
| 13 | Balıkesirspor | 34 | 9 | 11 | 14 | 36 | 48 | −12 | 38 | |
| 14 | Altınordu | 34 | 8 | 13 | 13 | 37 | 44 | −7 | 37 | |
| 15 | Boluspor | 34 | 6 | 15 | 13 | 30 | 41 | −11 | 33 | |
| 16 | Osmanlıspor (Note: Osmanlıspor have been deducted 3 points.) | 34 | 8 | 9 | 17 | 41 | 53 | −12 | 30 | |
| 17 | Adanaspor | 34 | 3 | 12 | 19 | 31 | 53 | −22 | 21 | |
| 18 | Eskişehirspor (Note: Eskişehirspor have been deducted 15 points.) | 34 | 7 | 6 | 21 | 34 | 60 | −26 | 12 | |

Source: TFF
Rules for classification: 1) Points; 2) Head-to-head points; 3) Head-to-head goal difference; 4) Head-to-head goals scored; 5) Goal difference; 6) Goals scored
(C) Champions; (P) Promoted

== Turkish Cup ==
=== Final ===
29 July 2020
21:30 TRT

| Trabzonspor | 2–0 | Alanyaspor |
|---|---|---|
| Ömür 25'; Sørloth 90+10' | Report |

Atatürk Olympic Stadium, Istanbul
Attendance: 0
Referee: Ali Palabıyık

== National team ==
=== UEFA Euro 2020 qualification ===
| Pos | Team | Pld | W | D | L | GF | GA | GD | Pts | Qualification | (France) | (Turkey) | (Iceland) | (Albania) | (Andorra) | (Moldova) |
|---|---|---|---|---|---|---|---|---|---|---|---|---|---|---|---|---|
| 1 | France | 10 | 8 | 1 | 1 | 25 | 6 | +19 | 25 | Qualify for final tournament | — | 1–1 | 4–0 | 4–1 | 3–0 | 2–1 |
| 2 | Turkey | 10 | 7 | 2 | 1 | 18 | 3 | +15 | 23 | Qualify for final tournament | 2–0 | — | 0–0 | 1–0 | 1–0 | 4–0 |
| 3 | Iceland | 10 | 6 | 1 | 3 | 14 | 11 | +3 | 19 | Advance to play-offs via Nations League | 0–1 | 2–1 | — | 1–0 | 2–0 | 3–0 |
| 4 | Albania | 10 | 4 | 1 | 5 | 16 | 14 | +2 | 13 | | 0–2 | 0–2 | 4–2 | — | 2–2 | 2–0 |
| 5 | Andorra | 10 | 1 | 1 | 8 | 3 | 20 | −17 | 4 | | 0–4 | 0–2 | 0–2 | 0–3 | — | 1–0 |
| 6 | Moldova | 10 | 1 | 0 | 9 | 4 | 26 | −22 | 3 | | 1–4 | 0–4 | 1–2 | 0–4 | 1–0 | — |

Source: UEFA
Rules for classification: Qualification tiebreakers

| 7 September 2019 UEFA Euro 2020 qualifying | Turkey | 1–0 | Andorra | Istanbul, Turkey |
| 21:45 UTC+3 | Tufan 89' | Report | | Stadium: Vodafone Park; Attendance: 42,600; Referee: Donald Robertson (Scotland) |

| 10 September 2019 UEFA Euro 2020 qualifying | Moldova | 0–4 | Turkey | Chișinău, Moldova |
| 21:45 UTC+3 | | Report | Tosun 37', 79'; Türüç 57'; Yazıcı 88' | Stadium: Zimbru Stadium; Attendance: 8,281; Referee: Davide Massa (Italy) |

| 11 October 2019 UEFA Euro 2020 qualifying | Turkey | 1–0 | Albania | Istanbul, Turkey |
| 21:45 UTC+3 | Tosun 90' | Report | | Stadium: Şükrü Saracoğlu Stadium; Attendance: 41,438; Referee: Ovidiu Hațegan (Romania) |

| 14 October 2019 UEFA Euro 2020 qualifying | France | 1–1 | Turkey | Saint-Denis, France |
| 20:45 UTC+1 | Giroud 76' | Report | Ayhan 81' | Stadium: Stade de France; Attendance: 72,154; Referee: Felix Brych (Germany) |

| 14 November 2019 UEFA Euro 2020 qualifying | Turkey | 0–0 | Iceland | Istanbul, Turkey |
| 20:00 UTC+3 | | Report | | Stadium: Türk Telekom Stadium; Attendance: 48,329; Referee: Anthony Taylor (England) |

| 17 November 2019 UEFA Euro 2020 qualifying | Andorra | 0–2 | Turkey | Andorra la Vella, Andorra |
| 20:45 UTC+1 | | Report | Ünal 17', 21' (pen.) | Stadium: Estadi Nacional; Attendance: 2,357; Referee: Ivan Kružliak (Slovakia) |

== Turkish clubs in Europe ==
=== UEFA Champions League ===
==== Third qualifying round ====
| Team 1 | Agg. | Team 2 | 1st leg | 2nd leg |
|---|---|---|---|---|
| İstanbul Başakşehir (Turkey) | 0–3 | (Greece) Olympiacos | 0–1 | 0–2 |

==== Group stage ====
===== Group A =====
| Pos | Team | Pld | W | D | L | GF | GA | GD | Pts | Qualification | PAR | RMA | BRU | GAL |
|---|---|---|---|---|---|---|---|---|---|---|---|---|---|---|
| 1 | (France) Paris Saint-Germain | 6 | 5 | 1 | 0 | 17 | 2 | +15 | 16 | Advance to knockout phase | — | 3–0 | 1–0 | 5–0 |
| 2 | (Spain) Real Madrid | 6 | 3 | 2 | 1 | 14 | 8 | +6 | 11 | Advance to knockout phase | 2–2 | — | 2–2 | 6–0 |
| 3 | (Belgium) Club Brugge | 6 | 0 | 3 | 3 | 4 | 12 | −8 | 3 | Transfer to Europa League | 0–5 | 1–3 | — | 0–0 |
| 4 | (Turkey) Galatasaray | 6 | 0 | 2 | 4 | 1 | 14 | −13 | 2 | | 0–1 | 0–1 | 1–1 | — |

Source: UEFA
Rules for classification: Group stage tiebreakers

=== UEFA Europa League ===
==== Second qualifying round ====
| Team 1 | Agg. | Team 2 | 1st leg | 2nd leg |
|---|---|---|---|---|
| Yeni Malatyaspor (Turkey) | 3–2 | (Slovenia) Olimpija Ljubljana | 2–2 | 1–0 |

==== Third qualifying round ====
| Team 1 | Agg. | Team 2 | 1st leg | 2nd leg |
|---|---|---|---|---|
| Partizan (Serbia) | 3–2 | (Turkey) Yeni Malatyaspor | 3–1 | 0–1 |
| Sparta Prague (Czech Republic) | 3–4 | (Turkey) Trabzonspor | 2–2 | 1–2 |

==== Play-off round ====
| Team 1 | Agg. | Team 2 | 1st leg | 2nd leg |
|---|---|---|---|---|
| AEK Athens (Greece) | 3–3 (a) | (Turkey) Trabzonspor | 1–3 | 2–0 |

==== Group stage ====
===== Group C =====
| Pos | Team | Pld | W | D | L | GF | GA | GD | Pts | Qualification | BSL | GET | KRA | TRA |
|---|---|---|---|---|---|---|---|---|---|---|---|---|---|---|
| 1 | (Switzerland) Basel | 6 | 4 | 1 | 1 | 12 | 4 | +8 | 13 | Advance to knockout phase | — | 2–1 | 5–0 | 2–0 |
| 2 | (Spain) Getafe | 6 | 4 | 0 | 2 | 8 | 4 | +4 | 12 | Advance to knockout phase | 0–1 | — | 3–0 | 1–0 |
| 3 | (Russia) Krasnodar | 6 | 3 | 0 | 3 | 7 | 11 | −4 | 9 | | 1–0 | 1–2 | — | 3–1 |
| 4 | (Turkey) Trabzonspor | 6 | 0 | 1 | 5 | 3 | 11 | −8 | 1 | | 2–2 | 0–1 | 0–2 | — |

Source: UEFA
Rules for classification: Group stage tiebreakers

===== Group J =====
| Pos | Team | Pld | W | D | L | GF | GA | GD | Pts | Qualification | IBS | ROM | MGB | WLB |
|---|---|---|---|---|---|---|---|---|---|---|---|---|---|---|
| 1 | (Turkey) İstanbul Başakşehir | 6 | 3 | 1 | 2 | 7 | 9 | −2 | 10 | Advance to knockout phase | — | 0–3 | 1–1 | 1–0 |
| 2 | (Italy) Roma | 6 | 2 | 3 | 1 | 12 | 6 | +6 | 9 | Advance to knockout phase | 4–0 | — | 1–1 | 2–2 |
| 3 | (Germany) Borussia Mönchengladbach | 6 | 2 | 2 | 2 | 6 | 9 | −3 | 8 | | 1–2 | 2–1 | — | 0–4 |
| 4 | (Austria) Wolfsberger AC | 6 | 1 | 2 | 3 | 7 | 8 | −1 | 5 | | 0–3 | 1–1 | 0–1 | — |

Source: UEFA
Rules for classification: Group stage tiebreakers

===== Group K =====
| Pos | Team | Pld | W | D | L | GF | GA | GD | Pts | Qualification | BRA | WOL | SLO | BES |
|---|---|---|---|---|---|---|---|---|---|---|---|---|---|---|
| 1 | (Portugal) Braga | 6 | 4 | 2 | 0 | 15 | 9 | +6 | 14 | Advance to knockout phase | — | 3–3 | 2–2 | 3–1 |
| 2 | (England) Wolverhampton Wanderers | 6 | 4 | 1 | 1 | 11 | 5 | +6 | 13 | Advance to knockout phase | 0–1 | — | 1–0 | 4–0 |
| 3 | (Slovakia) Slovan Bratislava | 6 | 1 | 1 | 4 | 10 | 13 | −3 | 4 | | 2–4 | 1–2 | — | 4–2 |
| 4 | (Turkey) Beşiktaş | 6 | 1 | 0 | 5 | 6 | 15 | −9 | 3 | | 1–2 | 0–1 | 2–1 | — |

Source: UEFA
Rules for classification: Group stage tiebreakers

==== Knockout phase ====
===== Round of 32 =====
| Team 1 | Agg. | Team 2 | 1st leg | 2nd leg |
|---|---|---|---|---|
| Sporting CP (Portugal) | 4–5 | (Turkey) İstanbul Başakşehir | 3–1 | 1–4 (a.e.t.) |

===== Round of 16 =====
| Team 1 | Agg. | Team 2 | 1st leg | 2nd leg |
|---|---|---|---|---|
| İstanbul Başakşehir (Turkey) | 1–3 | (Denmark) Copenhagen | 1–0 | 0–3 |
