= Kayra (name) =

- Gender: Unisex
- Language: Turkish

Origin
- Language: Turkic

Other names
- Related names: Umay

Kayra is a unisex Turkish given name. In Turkic mythology, Kayra is a supreme deity associated with creation and the sky, often considered the god of the universe and all life.

== People ==
=== Given name ===
- Kayra Özdemir (born 1988), French-born Turkish judoka
- Kayra Zabcı (born 2001), Turkish actress

=== Middle name ===
- Çağan Kayra Erciyas (born 2003), Turkish footballer
- Kartal Kayra Yılmaz (born 2000), Turkish footballer
