= Oğuz Aydın =

Turkish footballer (born 2000)

- Aydın with Fenerbahçe in 2026

Personal information
- Full name: Oğuz Aydın
- Date of birth: 27 October 2000 (age 26)
- Place of birth: The Hague, Netherlands
- Height: 1.78 m (5 ft 10 in)
- Position: Winger

Team information
- Current team: Fenerbahçe
- Number: 70

Youth career
- 2011–2016: AZ
- 2016–2018: Bucaspor

Senior career*
Years	Team	Apps	(Gls)
2018–2019	Bucaspor	42	(5)
2019–2021	Bucaspor 1928	46	(12)
2019–2020	→ Karacabey Belediyespor (loan)	6	(0)
2021–2024	Alanyaspor	83	(20)
2024–	Fenerbahçe	54	(10)

International career^{‡}
2018	Turkey U19	1	(0)
2022	Turkey U21	1	(0)
2024–	Turkey	18	(0)
- * Club domestic league appearances and goals as of 8 November 2026 ‡ National team caps and goals as of 15 November 2026

Oğuz Aydın (Turkish: [oˈuz ajˈdɯn]; born 27 October 2000 is a professional footballer who plays as a winger for Süper Lig club Fenerbahçe. Born in the Netherlands, he plays for the Turkey national team.

== Club career ==
=== Early career ===
Aydın began his career with AZ Alkmaar in 2011, before moving to Turkey in 2016. He played for Bucaspor Academy from 2016 to 2017 season to January 2018.

Aydın began his senior career with Bucaspor in January 2018, and moved to Bucaspor 1928 on 7 August 2019. He spent first half of the 2019–20 season on loan with Karacabey Belediyespor, then he back to Bucaspor 1928 for the second half of the 2019–20 season.

In his second season, he emerged as a versatile player for Bucaspor 1928, occupying multiple positions, in the first eleven, mainly at both winger positions. He finished the season with 11 goals and 3 assists across all competitions.

=== Alanyaspor ===
On 24 June 2021, he transferred to Alanyaspor, signing a 5-year contract. He made his professional debut with Alanyaspor in a 6–3 Süper Lig win over Kayserispor on 18 October 2021.

He showed a very successful performance in his club with 13 goals in 77 matches in all competitions, where he stayed for 3 seasons, and was promoted to the national team.

=== Fenerbahçe ===
On 16 July 2024, Aydın transferred to Fenerbahçe with a 4-year agreement. He made his continental debut in a 1–2 UEFA Champions League 2024-25 third qualifying round lose against Lille in France on 6 August 2024.

On 10 August 2024, he made his Süper Lig debut in a 1–0 home win against Adana Demirspor in Şükrü Saraçoğlu Stadium.

On 23 November 2024, in an away match against Kayserispor, Aydın wore his first cap as a starter and scored 2 goals in 11 minutes. One week later, on 2 December 2024, he scored an early goal at 2nd minute of the match and helped in an 3–1 Süper Lig victory against Gaziantep FK.

On 5 February 2025, he made a 61st mins substitute in a Turkish Cup match against Erzurumspor and performed three assist in 78th, 81st and 89th mins.

On 20 October 2026, he scored his first continental goal against Slavia Prague in a 2-2 2026–27 UEFA Champions League league phase game.

== International career ==
Born in the Netherlands. He represented the Turkey U19s in a 1–1 2019 UEFA European Under-19 Championship tie with the Denmark U19s on 24 March 2018. On 25 March 2022, he represented Turkey U21s in a 0–2 2023 UEFA European Under-21 Championship qualification away win over the Scotland U21s.

In March 2024 Aydın received his first call-up to the senior Turkey squad for the match against Hungary and Austria. Aydın made his debut for the Turkey national team on 4 June 2024 in a friendly against Italy.

Having made a successful start to the 2024–25 season with Fenerbahçe, Aydın was called up by Vincenzo Montella to the national team for the 2024–25 UEFA Nations League promotion play-offs against Hungary on 14 March 2025.

On 2 June 2026, Aydin was selected in the 26-man squad for the 2026 FIFA World Cup.

== Style of play ==
Aydın often plays as a winger, and is capable of playing on either flank, due to his ability with both feet. He is capable of cutting into the centre onto his stronger right foot from the left wing, and of creating chances and providing assists for teammates from the right thanks to his vision. He is also able to play in the centre as a second striker, due to his composure, clinical finishing, and eye for goal.

== Career statistics ==
=== Club ===
As of match played 8 November 2026

Appearances and goals by club, season and competition
Club	Season	League			Turkish Cup		Europe		Other		Total	
Club	Season	Division	Apps	Goals	Apps	Goals	Apps	Goals	Apps	Goals	Apps	Goals
Bucaspor	2017–18	TFF Second League	12	0	0	0	—		—		12	0
Bucaspor	2018–19	TFF Third League	30	5	1	0	—		—		31	5
Bucaspor	Total		42	5	1	0	0	0	0	0	43	5
Bucaspor 1928	2019–20	TFF Third League	10	1	0	0	—		1 (Note: Appearance(s) in the play-offs)	0	11	1
Bucaspor 1928	2020–21	TFF Third League	30	10	1	0	—		5	1	36	11
Bucaspor 1928	Total		40	11	1	0	0	0	6	1	47	12
Karacabey Belediyespor (loan)	2019–20	TFF Third League	6	0	2	1	—		—		8	1
Alanyaspor	2021–22	Süper Lig	20	6	6	2	—		—		26	8
Alanyaspor	2022–23	Süper Lig	28	1	3	2	—		—		31	3
Alanyaspor	2023–24	Süper Lig	35	13	3	0	—		—		38	13
Alanyaspor	Total		83	20	12	4	0	0	0	0	95	24
Fenerbahçe	2024–25	Süper Lig	25	7	3	0	2 (Note: Appearance(s) in UEFA Champions League)	0	—		30	7
Fenerbahçe	2025–26	Süper Lig	18	0	5	0	11 (Note: Three appearances in UEFA Champions League, eight appearances in UEFA Europa League)	0	2 (Note: Appearance(s) in Turkish Super Cup)	0	36	0
Fenerbahçe	2026–27	Süper Lig	11	3	0	0	9	1	0	0	20	4
Fenerbahçe	Total		54	10	8	0	22	1	2	0	86	11
Career total			225	46	24	5	22	1	8	1	279	53

=== International ===
As of match played 15 November 2026

Appearances and goals by national team and year
National team	Year	Apps	Goals
Turkey	2024	1	0
Turkey	2025	8	0
Turkey	2026	9	0
Total		18	0

== Honours ==
Bucaspor 1928

- TFF 3. Lig: 2020-21 play-off winner

Fenerbahçe

- Turkish Super Cup: 2025
