= Cherif Ndiaye =

Senegalese footballer (born 1996)

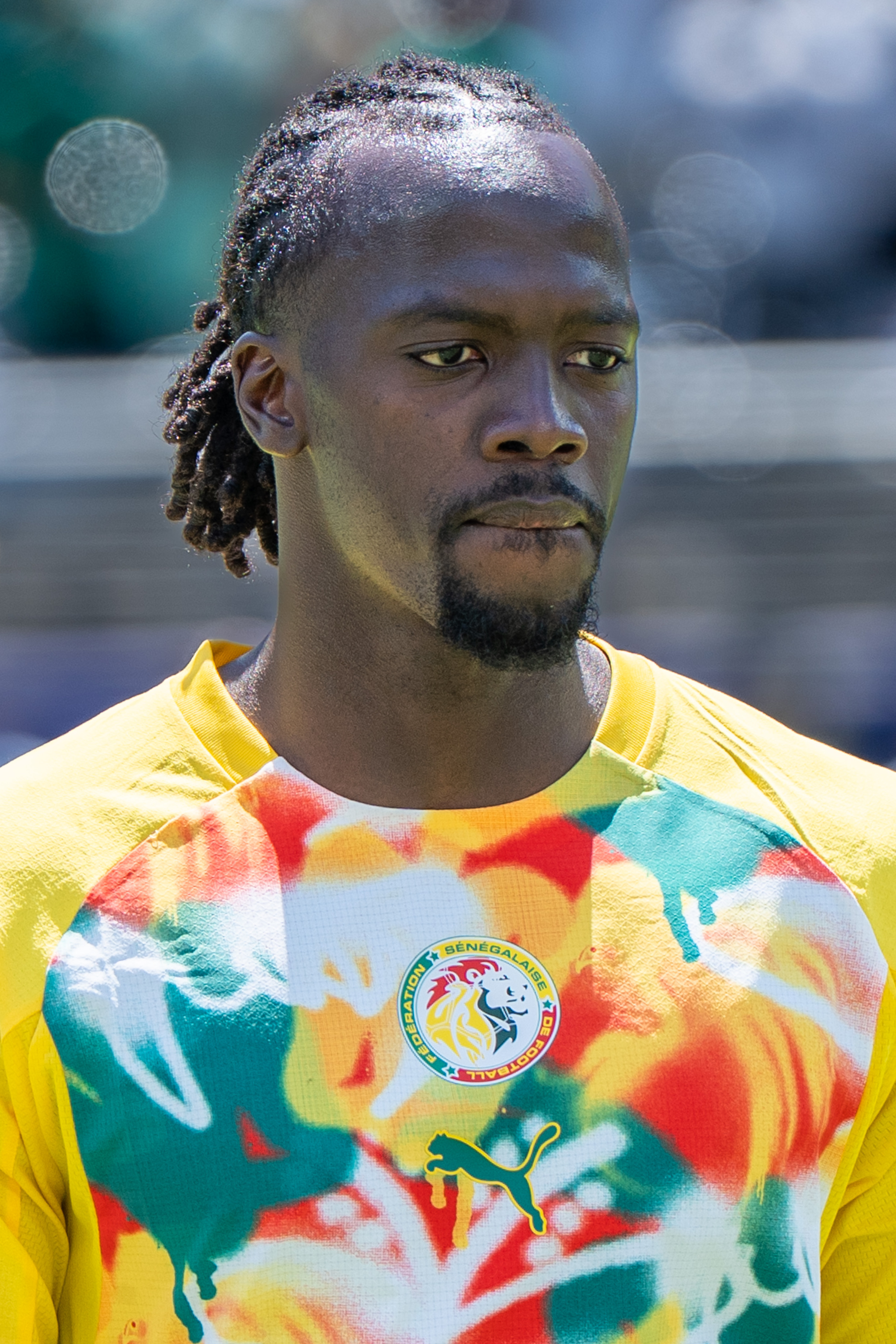
- Ndiaye with Senegal in 2026

Personal information
- Full name: Pape Cherif Ndiaye
- Date of birth: 23 January 1996 (age 30)
- Place of birth: Dakar, Senegal
- Height: 1.90 m (6 ft 3 in)
- Position: Forward

Team information
- Current team: PAOK (on loan from Samsunspor)
- Number: 27

Youth career
- Grand Yoff FC

Senior career*
Years	Team	Apps	(Gls)
2017–2019	Waasland-Beveren	9	(0)
2019–2021	Gorica	52	(15)
2020–2021	→ Göztepe (loan)	39	(10)
2021–2022	Göztepe	30	(10)
2022–2023	Shanghai Port	24	(9)
2023	Adana Demirspor	14	(9)
2023–2025	Red Star Belgrade	60	(31)
2025–	Samsunspor	23	(7)
2026–	→ PAOK (loan)	5	(2)

International career^{‡}
2024–	Senegal	19	(4)
Medal record
Men's football
Representing Senegal
Africa Cup of Nations
Runner-up	2025 Morocco
- * Club domestic league appearances and goals as of 23:30, 20 September 2026 (UTC) ‡ National team caps and goals as of 31 August 2026

Pape Cherif Ndiaye (born 23 January 1996) is a Senegalese professional footballer who plays as a forward for Super League Greece club PAOK, on loan from Samsunspor, and the Senegal national team.

== Club career ==
Ndiaye joined Waasland-Beveren from the Senegalese club Grand Yoff FC. He made his debut for Waasland-Beveren in a 1–0 loss on 21 January 2017 to K.V. Oostende.

=== Turkey career ===
Ndiaye played at Göztepe (2020–21, 2021–22 seasons) and Adana Demirspor (2022–23 half term, 2023) teams in Turkey. After going to China, SH Port, on 28 January 2023, Ndiaye returned to Turkey on loan to Adana Demirspor with an option to buy. He made a good performance by scoring 4 goals in 6 matches played by Adana Demirspor in the UEFA Europa Conference League qualifying round matches on 2023–24 season. The option to buy was exercised on 1 July 2023.

=== Red Star Belgrade ===
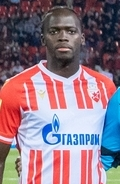
Ndiaye lining up for Red Star Belgrade in 2024

After Adana Demirspor failed to qualify for the UEFA Conference League, Ndiaye's excellent start to the season did not go unnoticed. In the last minutes of 4 September, Ndiaye inks a three-year contract, with an option for another year, with the UEFA Champions League participant Red Star Belgrade, in a transfer worth €4 million, along with Korean Hwang In-beom. In his new team, he made his UEFA Champions League debut against Manchester City match. His first score in that League is against Young Boys on 4 October 2023. 23 September 2024, he scored a hat-trick in the Eternal derby against Partizan Belgrade and becoming the first player to do so in 56 years since Stevan Ostojić on 17 November 1968.

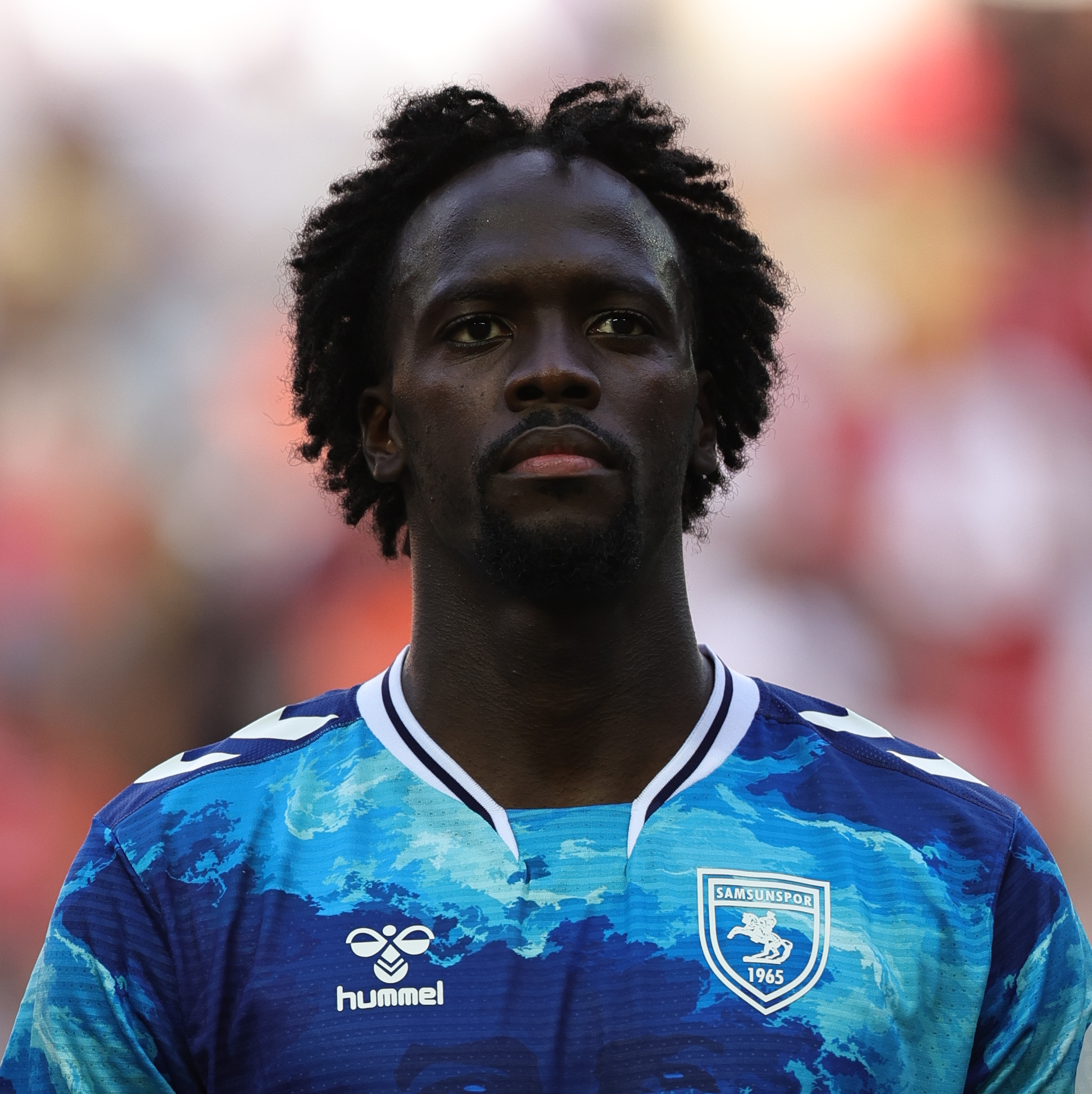
Ndiaye with Samsunspor in 2025

== International career ==
Ndiaye made his debut for the Senegal national team on 6 June 2024 in a World Cup qualifier against DR Congo at the Diamniadio Olympic Stadium. He substituted Nicolas Jackson in the 90th minute as the game ended in a 1–1 draw.

On May 21, 2026, Ndiaye was officially selected by Senegal's coach Pape Thiaw from his list of 28 players to participate in the 2026 FIFA World Cup.

== Career statistics ==
=== Club ===
As of match played 9 May 2026

Appearances and goals by club, season and competition
Club	Season	League			National cup (Note: Includes Croatian Football Cup, Turkish Cup, Chinese FA Cup, Serbian Cup)		Continental		Other		Total	
Club	Season	Division	Apps	Goals	Apps	Goals	Apps	Goals	Apps	Goals	Apps	Goals
Waasland-Beveren	2016–17	Belgian Pro League	3	0	0	0	—		1	0	4	0
Waasland-Beveren	2017–18	Belgian Pro League	4	0	0	0	—		4	1	8	1
Waasland-Beveren	2018–19	Belgian Pro League	1	0	0	0	—		0	0	1	0
Waasland-Beveren	Total		8	0	0	0	—		5	1	13	1
Gorica	2018–19	HNL	17	8	0	0	—		—		17	8
Gorica	2019–20	HNL	33	7	3	4	—		—		36	11
Gorica	2020–21	HNL	2	0	0	0	—		—		2	0
Gorica	Total		52	15	3	4	—		—		55	19
Göztepe (loan)	2020–21	Süper Lig	39	10	1	2	—		—		40	12
Göztepe	2021–22	Süper Lig	30	10	3	2	—		—		33	12
Shanghai Port	2022	Chinese Super League	24	9	1	0	—		—		25	9
Adana Demirspor (loan)	2022–23	Süper Lig	12	8	0	0	—		—		12	8
Adana Demirspor	2023–24	Süper Lig	2	1	0	0	6 (Note: Appearances in UEFA Europa Conference League)	4	—		8	5
Red Star Belgrade	2023–24	Serbian SuperLiga	28	11	5	3	6 (Note: Appearances in UEFA Champions League)	1	—		39	15
Red Star Belgrade	2024–25	Serbian SuperLiga	29	19	3	1	10	2	—		42	22
Red Star Belgrade	2025–26	Serbian SuperLiga	3	1	0	0	5	2	—		8	3
Red Star Belgrade	Total		60	31	8	4	21	5	—		89	40
Samsunspor	2025–26	Süper Lig	23	7	2	1	4 (Note: Appearances in UEFA Conference League)	2	—		29	10
Career total			250	91	18	13	31	11	5	1	304	116

=== International ===
As of match played 9 June 2026

Appearances and goals by national team and year
National team	Year	Apps	Goals
Senegal	2024	4	0
Senegal	2025	8	4
Senegal	2026	7	0
Total		19	4

Senegal score listed first, score column indicates score after each Ndiaye goal.

List of international goals scored by Cherif Ndiaye
No.	Date	Venue	Cap	Opponent	Score	Result	Competition
1	10 October 2025	Juba Stadium, Juba, South Sudan	8	South Sudan	5–0	5–0	2026 FIFA World Cup qualification
2	18 November 2025	Antalya Stadium, Antalya, Turkey	10	Kenya	8–0	8–0	Friendly
3	23 December 2025	Tangier Grand Stadium, Tangier, Morocco	11	Botswana	3–0	3–0	2025 Africa Cup of Nations
4	30 December 2025	Tangier Grand Stadium, Tangier, Morocco	12	Benin	3–0	3–0	2025 Africa Cup of Nations

== Honours ==
Red Star Belgrade

- Serbian SuperLiga: 2023–24, 2024–25
- Serbian Cup: 2023–24, 2024–25

Individual

- Serbian SuperLiga Player of the Week: 2024–25 (Round 9), (Round 24)
- Serbian SuperLiga top scorer: 2024–25
