= Goran Karačić =

Bosnian footballer (born 1996)

Personal information
- Date of birth: 18 August 1996 (age 30)
- Place of birth: Mostar, Bosnia and Herzegovina
- Height: 1.96 m (6 ft 5 in)
- Position: Goalkeeper

Team information
- Current team: Zrinjski Mostar
- Number: 18

Youth career
- 2006–2015: Zrinjski Mostar

Senior career*
Years	Team	Apps	(Gls)
2015–2016	Zrinjski Mostar	24	(0)
2016–2022	Adanaspor	91	(0)
2017–2018	→ SV Sandhausen (loan)	0	(0)
2022–2023	Adana Demirspor	1	(0)
2024–	Zrinjski Mostar	50	(0)

International career
2012	Bosnia and Herzegovina U17	4	(0)
2014–2015	Bosnia and Herzegovina U19	15	(0)
2015–2017	Bosnia and Herzegovina U21	5	(0)
- * Club domestic league appearances and goals as of 12 September 2026

Goran Karačić (pronounced [ɡǒran kǎratʃitɕ]; born 18 August 1996) is a Bosnian professional footballer who plays as a goalkeeper for Bosnian Premier League club Zrinjski Mostar.

Karačić started his professional career at Zrinjski Mostar, before joining Adanaspor in 2016. He was loaned to SV Sandhausen in 2017. Five years later, he moved to Adana Demirspor. In 2024, he went back to Zrinjski Mostar.

== Club career ==
=== Early career ===
Karačić came through the youth academy of his hometown club Zrinjski Mostar, which he joined in 2006. He made his professional debut against Olimpic on 26 July 2015 at the age of 18.

In June 2016, he moved to Turkish team Adanaspor. In August 2017, he was sent on a season-long loan to German side SV Sandhausen.

In July 2022, Karačić signed with Adana Demirspor.

In January 2024, he returned to Zrinjski Mostar.

== International career ==
Karačić represented Bosnia and Herzegovina at all youth levels.

In May 2016, he received his first senior call-up, for a friendly game against Spain and the 2016 Kirin Cup.

== Personal life ==
Goran Karačić is the youngest of three brothers. His older brothers Ivan and Igor are both professional handball players. Ivan represents Bosnia and Herzegovina, while Igor plays for Croatia.

== Career statistics ==
=== Club ===
As of match played 12 September 2026

Appearances and goals by club, season and competition
Club	Season	League			National cup (Note: Includes Turkish Cup, Bosnian Cup)		Continental		Other		Total	
Club	Season	Division	Apps	Goals	Apps	Goals	Apps	Goals	Apps	Goals	Apps	Goals
Zrinjski Mostar	2015–16	Bosnian Premier League	24	0	0	0	0	0	–		24	0
Adanaspor	2016–17	Süper Lig	12	0	0	0	–		–		12	0
Adanaspor	2018–19	1. Lig	15	0	0	0	–		–		15	0
Adanaspor	2019–20	1. Lig	18	0	1	0	–		–		19	0
Adanaspor	2020–21	1. Lig	26	0	0	0	–		–		26	0
Adanaspor	2021–22	1. Lig	20	0	0	0	–		–		20	0
Adanaspor	Total		91	0	1	0	–		–		92	0
Adana Demirspor	2022–23	Süper Lig	1	0	1	0	–		–		2	0
Adana Demirspor	2023–24	Süper Lig	0	0	0	0	6 (Note: Appearances in UEFA Europa Conference League)	0	–		6	0
Adana Demirspor	Total		1	0	1	0	6	0	–		8	0
Zrinjski Mostar	2023–24	Bosnian Premier League	2	0	7	0	–		–		9	0
Zrinjski Mostar	2024–25	Bosnian Premier League	16	0	2	0	0	0	1 (Note: Appearance in Bosnian Supercup)	0	19	0
Zrinjski Mostar	2025–26	Bosnian Premier League	25	0	4	0	14 (Note: Four appearance in UEFA Champions League; four appearances in UEFA Europa League; six appearances in UEFA Conference League)	0	1	0	44	0
Zrinjski Mostar	2026–27	Bosnian Premier League	7	0	0	0	–		–		7	0
Zrinjski Mostar	Total		50	0	13	0	14	0	2	0	79	0
Career total			166	0	15	0	20	0	2	0	203	0

== Honours ==
Zrinjski Mostar

- Bosnian Premier League: 2015–16, 2024–25
- Bosnian Cup: 2023–24
- Bosnian Supercup: 2024
