= Metehan Mimaroğlu =

Turkish footballer

Personal information
- Date of birth: 7 July 1994 (age 32)
- Place of birth: Istanbul, Turkey
- Height: 1.78 m (5 ft 10 in)
- Position: Winger

Team information
- Current team: Trabzonspor
- Number: 77

Senior career*
| Years | Team | Apps | (Gls) |
| 2013–2014 | Karacabey Belediyespor | 4 | (0) |
| 2014–2015 | İstanbul Güngörenspor | 1 | (0) |
| 2015–2016 | Konyaaltı Belediyespor | 0 | (0) |
| 2016–2017 | Edirnespor | 0 | (0) |
| 2017–2018 | Ergene Velimeşe | 30 | (3) |
| 2018–2019 | Eyüpspor | 0 | (0) |
| 2018–2019 | → Alibeyköyspor (loan) | 30 | (9) |
| 2019 | Osmaniyespor FK | 16 | (5) |
| 2019–2021 | Altınordu | 49 | (12) |
| 2021–2022 | Adana Demirspor | 9 | (0) |
| 2022–2024 | Eyüpspor | 0 | (0) |
| 2022–2023 | → Ümraniyespor (loan) | 10 | (0) |
| 2023 | → Altınordu (loan) | 16 | (1) |
| 2023–2024 | → Bandırmaspor (loan) | 27 | (6) |
| 2024–2026 | Gençlerbirliği | 67 | (20) |
| 2026– | Trabzonspor | 0 | (0) |
- * Club domestic league appearances and goals as of 10 June 2026

Metehan Mimaroğlu (born 7 July 1994) is a Turkish professional footballer who plays as a winger for Trabzonspor.

== Career ==
Mimaroğlu began his footballing career with Karacabey Belediyespor in the TFF First League, and spent his early career with various semi-pro and amateur clubs in Turkey. In 2019, he moved to Altınordu in the TFF First League. After cementing his place in their first team, he transferred to Adana Demirspor on 19 July 2021. He made his professional debut for Adana Demirspor in a 3–1 Süper Lig loss to Çaykur Rizespor on 18 September 2021.

On 5 August 2022, he joined Ümraniyespor on a season-long loan.
