= Berk Yıldız =

Turkish footballer

Personal information
- Date of birth: 9 January 1996 (age 30)
- Place of birth: Konak, Turkey
- Height: 1.78 m (5 ft 10 in)
- Position: Midfielder

Team information
- Current team: Şanlıurfaspor
- Number: 7

Youth career
- 2007–2008: Karşıyaka
- 2009–2014: Galatasaray

Senior career*
Years	Team	Apps	(Gls)
2014–2015	Galatasaray	0	(0)
2014–2015	→ Elazığspor (loan)	18	(1)
2015–2018	Elazığspor	58	(4)
2018–2022	Yeni Malatyaspor	6	(0)
2018–2020	→ Adana Demirspor (loan)	61	(12)
2021–2022	→ Boluspor (loan)	27	(6)
2022–2023	Adana Demirspor	6	(0)
2023–2025	Boluspor	61	(3)
2025–	Şanlıurfaspor	14	(3)

International career^{‡}
2011	Turkey U15	2	(0)
2011–2012	Turkey U16	10	(2)
2012	Turkey U17	5	(0)
2013	Turkey U18	2	(0)
2017	Turkey U21	3	(1)
- * Club domestic league appearances and goals as of 13 November 2025 ‡ National team caps and goals as of 1 March 2018

Berk Yıldız (born 9 January 1996) is a Turkish professional footballer who plays as a midfielder for TFF 2. Lig club Şanlıurfaspor.

== Professional career ==
A youth product for Galatasaray, Berk made one appearance for them in a 4–1 Turkish Cup win over Adana Demirspor on 10 January 2012, becoming the fourth youngest first-team player of Galatasaray.

Berk transferred to Elazığspor and after a couple successful seasons moved to Yeni Malatyaspor on 10 January 2018. He made his professional debut for Malataspor in a 3–1 Süper Lig win over Kardemir Karabükspor on 25 February 2018.

On 13 July 2019, he joined Adana Demirspor on loan for two years.

On 26 January 2023, Yıldız signed a 2.5-year contract with Boluspor.
