= Recep Yemişçi =

Turkish footballer

Personal information
- Date of birth: 1 January 1999 (age 27)
- Place of birth: İzmir, Turkey
- Height: 1.85 m (6 ft 1 in)
- Position: Centre-back

Team information
- Current team: Çorluspor
- Number: 77

Youth career
- 2010–2023: Bucaspor
- 2013–2016: Altınordu

Senior career*
Years	Team	Apps	(Gls)
2016–2021	Altınordu	31	(0)
2019–2021	→ Niğde Anadolu (loan)	55	(6)
2021–2025	Ankaraspor	128	(8)
2022	→ Kasımpaşa (loan)	1	(0)
2025–2026	Şanlıurfaspor	26	(0)
2026–	Çorluspor	4	(0)

International career
2014–2015	Turkey U16	12	(0)
2015–2016	Turkey U17	13	(0)
2016–2017	Turkey U18	5	(0)
2016–2017	Turkey U19	3	(0)
- * Club domestic league appearances and goals as of 1 October 2026

Recep Yemişçi (born 1 January 1999) is a Turkish professional footballer who plays as a centre-back for TFF 2. Lig club Çorluspor.

== Professional career ==
Yemişçi is a youth product of the academies of Bucaspor and Altınordu, and began his senior career with Altınordu in 2016. He moved to Niğde Anadolu on loan for 2 season from 2019 to 2021. In July 2021, he joined Ankaraspor on loan for a season. On 6 August 2022, he transferred to the Süper Lig club Kasımpaşa. He made his professional debut 2 days later with Kasımpaşa in a 4–0 Süper Lig loss to İstanbul Başakşehir.

== International career ==
Yemişçi is a youth international for Turkey, having represented them from U16s to U19s.
