= Boyacı Mosque =

Mosque located in Gaziantep, Turkey

Coordinates: 37°03′43″N 37°23′18″E

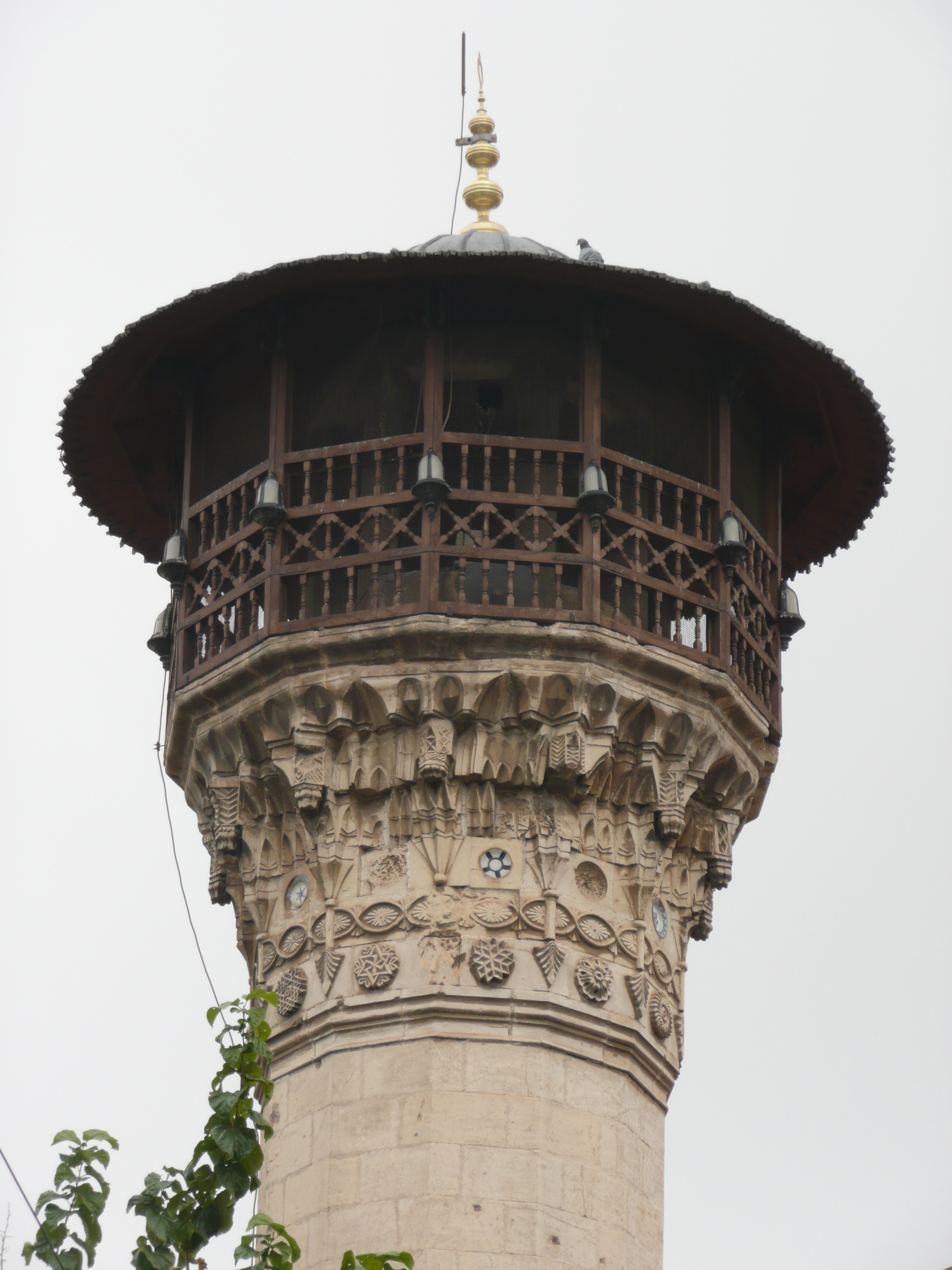
- Minaret of the mosque (appears to be of the Kozluca Mosque)

Religion
- Affiliation: Islam
- Region: Southern Anatolia

Location
- Location: Gaziantep, Turkey
- Interactive map of Boyacı Mosque

Architecture
- Type: Mosque
- Style: Seljuk
- Completed: 1357

Specifications
- Minaret: 1
- Materials: cut stone

Boyacı Camii (Turkish for "Painter's Mosque"), also called Boyacıoğlu Camii or Kadı Kemalettin Camii is a Mosque in Gaziantep, Turkey.

It is located in the Şahinbey district of the city at the intersection of Kutlar Street and Hamdi Kutlar Avenue. Construction began in 1211 under the orders of Kadı Kemalettin Bey and it was finished in 1357.
