= İsmail Çokçalış =

Turkish footballer (born 2000)

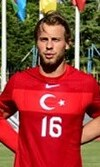
- Çokçalış in 2022

Personal information
- Date of birth: 21 June 2000 (age 26)
- Place of birth: Osmangazi, Turkey
- Height: 1.76 m (5 ft 9 in)
- Position: Right-back

Team information
- Current team: Ankaragücü
- Number: 16

Youth career
- 2012–2018: Bursaspor

Senior career*
Years	Team	Apps	(Gls)
2018–2022	Bursaspor	33	(1)
2019	→ Karacabey Belediyespor (loan)	15	(0)
2022–2024	Adana Demirspor	23	(0)
2024–	Ankaragücü	29	(0)

International career^{‡}
2015–2016	Turkey U16	4	(0)
2017	Turkey U17	2	(0)
2017	Turkey U18	1	(0)
2018–2019	Turkey U19	4	(0)
2019	Turkey U20	1	(0)
2021	Turkey U21	2	(0)
2022	Turkey U23	3	(0)
Medal record
Men's football
Representing Turkey
Islamic Solidarity Games
Gold medal – first place	2021 Konya
- * Club domestic league appearances and goals as of 15 June 2025 ‡ National team caps and goals as of 06:16, 2 February 2023 (UTC)

İsmail Çokçalış (born 21 June 2000) is a Turkish professional footballer who plays as a right-back for Ankaragücü.

== Professional career ==
A youth product of Bursaspor, İsmail signed his first professional contract on 26 March 2018. İsmail made his professional debut for Bursaspor in a 1-0 Süper Lig loss to Gençlerbirliği S.K. on 18 May 2018. On 14 January 2022, he transferred to Adana Demirspor.

== International career ==
İsmail is a youth international for Turkey, and was a member of the Turkey U17s at the 2017 UEFA European Under-17 Championship. İsmail represented the Turkey U23s in their winning campaign at the 2021 Islamic Solidarity Games.

== Honours ==
Turkey U23

- Islamic Solidarity Games: 2021
