= Çağan Kayra Erciyas =

Turkish footballer (born 2003)

Personal information
- Date of birth: 4 February 2003 (age 23)
- Place of birth: Hatay, Turkey
- Position: Centre-back

Team information
- Current team: Karadeniz Ereğli Belediyespor
- Number: 12

Youth career
- 2015–2017: Karaağaç Efsanespor
- 2017–2022: Alanyaspor

Senior career*
Years	Team	Apps	(Gls)
2022–2025	Alanyaspor	4	(0)
2023–2025	→ Fethiyespor (loan)	31	(1)
2025–	Karadeniz Ereğli Belediyespor	10	(1)

International career^{‡}
2022	Turkey U19	4	(0)
- * Club domestic league appearances and goals as of 9 November 2025 ‡ National team caps and goals as of 29 March 2022

Çağan Kayra Erciyas (born 4 February 2003) is a Turkish professional footballer who plays as a centre-back for TFF 3. Lig club Karadeniz Ereğli Belediyespor.

== Professional career ==
Erciyas is a youth product of Karaağaç Efsanespor and Alanyaspor. He made his professional debut with Alanyaspor in a 1-1 Süper Lig tie with İstanbul Başakşehir on 8 January 2022. On 9 February 2022, he signed a 4-year contract keeping him at Alanyaspor.
