= Ertaç Özbir =

Turkish footballer

Personal information
- Date of birth: 25 October 1989 (age 37)
- Place of birth: Seyhan, Adana, Turkey
- Height: 1.86 m (6 ft 1 in)
- Position: Goalkeeper

Team information
- Current team: Ankaragücü
- Number: 25

Youth career
- 2003–2007: Sincan Belediyespor
- 2007–2009: Etimesgut Şekerspor

Senior career*
Years	Team	Apps	(Gls)
2009–2010	Etimesgut Şekerspor	13	(0)
2010–2015	Kasımpaşa	11	(0)
2015–2019	Yeni Malatyaspor	71	(0)
2019–2020	Gençlerbirliği	16	(0)
2020–2022	Yeni Malatyaspor	31	(0)
2022–2024	Adana Demirspor	44	(0)
2024–	Ankaragücü	28	(0)
- * Club domestic league appearances and goals as of 15 June 2025

Ertaç Özbir (born 25 October 1989) is a Turkish professional footballer who plays as a goalkeeper for Ankaragücü.

== Club career ==
Özbir began his amateur footballing career as a youth player with Sincan Belediyespor. After four years with the club, he was transferred to Etimesgut Şekerspor. Özbir made his professional debut against Tokatspor on 14 February 2010. He totaled 13 appearances in the TFF Second League during the 2009–10 season. Kasımpaşa transferred him before the start of the 2010–11 season, making his Süper Lig against Antalyaspor on 3 October 2010. On 28 August 2019, Özbir signed a two-year contract with Gençlerbirliği. On 4 October 2020, Özbir returned to Yeni Malatyaspor, signing a two-year contract.

Özbir was transferred to Adana Demirspor in the 2022 summer transfer period. He made his debut in his new team against Giresunspor on 8 August 2022. In his first season, as the first goalkeeper of the team, he made the first 11 appearances in 32 league matches. He kept a clean sheet in 8 matches.

== International career ==
Özbir was called up to the Turkey under-21 national team for the first time in September 2010.

In October 2023, he received his first call-up to the Turkey senior national team for two UEFA Euro 2024 qualifying matches against Croatia and Latvia.
