= Hıjran Alı Boyacı =

Turkish footballer

Personal information
- Date of birth: 11 January 2005 (age 21)
- Place of birth: Edmonton, Alberta, Canada
- Height: 1.78 m (5 ft 10 in)
- Position: Midfielder

Youth career
- BTB Soccer Academy
- Adana Demirspor

Senior career*
Years	Team	Apps	(Gls)
2022–2023	Adana Demirspor	1	(0)
2024–2025	İskenderunspor	4	(0)

International career^{‡}
2022	Turkey U17	1	(0)
- * Club domestic league appearances and goals as of 3 May 2025 ‡ National team caps and goals as of 04:50, 25 May 2022 (UTC)

Hıjran Alı "Ejo" Boyacı (born 11 January 2005) is a professional footballer who plays as a midfielder. Born in Canada, he represented Turkey at youth level.

== Club career ==
Boyacı is a product of the BTB Soccer Academy in Edmonton, Alberta in Canada and moved to Turkey with Adana Demirspor's youth side. He made his professional debut with them in a 7–0 Süper Lig win over Göztepe, coming on as a substitute in the 72nd minute.

== International career ==
Boyacı was born in Canada and is of Turkish descent. He is a youth international for Turkey, having represented the Turkey U17s.
