= Vedat Karakuş =

Turkish footballer

Personal information
- Date of birth: 28 February 1998 (age 28)
- Place of birth: Şanlıurfa, Turkey
- Height: 1.90 m (6 ft 3 in)
- Position: Goalkeeper

Team information
- Current team: Manisa
- Number: 1

Youth career
- 2010–2016: Lüleburgazspor

Senior career*
Years	Team	Apps	(Gls)
2016–2019	Kayserispor	1	(0)
2019–2020	Modafen	9	(0)
2020–2025	Adana Demirspor	23	(0)
2025–	Manisa	28	(0)
- * Club domestic league appearances and goals as of 5 May 2026

Vedat Karakuş (born 28 February 1998) is a Turkish professional footballer who plays as a goalkeeper for TFF 1. Lig club Manisa.

== Professional career ==
Karakuş is a youth product of Lüleburgazspor, and signed his first professional contract with Kayserispor in 2016. made his professional debut for Kayserispor in a 5-0 Süper Lig loss to Fenerbahçe on 2 April 2018. He had a stint with Modafen in the TFF Third League in 2019. He transferred to Adana Demirspor in the TFF First League in January 2020 where he mainly acted as backup goalkeeper, and helped them get promoted into the Süper Lig for the 2021-22 season.

== Honours ==
Adana Demirspor

- TFF First League: 2020–21
