= Modafen F.K. =

Modafen
- Full name: Modafen Futbol Kulübü
- Nicknames: Modamen, Atlılar (The Cavalry)
- Founded: 2011
- Ground: Alemdağ Stadium, Çekmeköy, Istanbul
- Capacity: 1,300
- Chairman: Fatih Kanberoğlu
- Manager: Sultan Ersayın
- League: TFF Third League
- Website: http://modafenfutbolkulubu.com/
Home colours	Away colours

Modafen Futbol Kulübü is a Turkish association football club located in the Çekmeköy district of Istanbul, Turkey.

== History ==
The Club was established in 2011. The club has strong ties with Modafen Schools. After the establishment of the club in 2011, they promoted three times in row. 2014–15 season they participate amateur divisions but they relegated. In 2019–20 season they managed to promote one more time which means they promoted five times, relegated once, and lost chance to promote once at playoff game since they established.

The club gained professional status at the end of 2018-19 season after defeating 1877 Alemdağspor at play-offs of Regional Amateur League.

2019-20 season started like a disaster for the team. They were almost relegated but thanks to covid Turkish Football Federation canceled the leagues. 2020-21 season they were lucky again. 2021-22 season the club relegated back to Regional Amateur League.

== Stadium ==
Modafen plays their home games at Alemdağ Stadium.

== Crest and colours ==
=== Crest ===
Modafen have had two main crests. The first version was original yellow and green colours and the second one current red and black.

=== Colours ===
The original colours of Modafen was yellow and green. Modafen Schools still use these colours. But the club changed their colours to red and black.

== Support ==
The fans are known as the "Modamen".

=== Rivalries ===
Because of having short history and playing in different levels each year, club does not have any serious rivalry.

== Records ==
Although club has a shorter history, they managed to set some interesting records.

Modafen's biggest winning scoreline in a competitive match is 11–0, achieved against Kocamustafapaşa in 2015-16 season. Modafen's biggest loss was against Diyarbekir 6-0 in 2019-20. Other heavy defeats were a 5–1 against Leventspor and a 4–0 against Yenibosna in 2014–15 season and 4-0 against Yesilyurt in 2019-20 season

Modafen hold a 16-game clean sheet streak (where they did not permit their opponent to score). They also hold a 13-game streak of keeping a clean sheet at home.

== Players ==
=== First team squad ===
As of 1 November 2021.

Note: Flags indicate national team as defined under FIFA eligibility rules; some limited exceptions apply. Players may hold more than one non-FIFA nationality.

No.	Pos.	Nation	Player
3	DF	TUR	Hakan Özkan
4	DF	TUR	Gökhan Çetinus
5	DF	TUR	Hasan Ozan Girgin (captain)
6	DF	TUR	Umut Uysal
7	FW	TUR	Muhammed Emir Yildirim
8	MF	TUR	Efe Niyazi Kurtulmuş
9	FW	TUR	Emirhan Atilla
11	FW	TUR	Yunus Emre Kefeli
12	DF	TUR	Emin Kaan Arslan
16	GK	TUR	Reşat Şen
17	DF	TUR	Omer Karanci
19	MF	TUR	Barin Aydogdu

No.	Pos.	Nation	Player
21	DF	TUR	Emin Kaan Arslan
22	MF	TUR	Yiğit Yılmaz
23	MF	TUR	Ismail Cembako
33	GK	TUR	Rasim Mutlu
41	FW	TUR	Emrecan Yildizhan
60	DF	TUR	Muhammed Sura Cetin
70	FW	TUR	Mustafa Cinar
77	DF	TUR	Mert Yamak
81	DF	TUR	Emre Bayraktarbasi
88	MF	TUR	Emirhan Adak

== League participations ==
- Turkish Regional Amateur League: 2014–15,2016-2017, 2017-2018, 2018-2019
- Amatör Futbol Ligleri: 2011–2014,2015–16
