= MKE Ankaragücü =

Multi-sports club in Turkey

- Full name: Makina ve Kimya Endüstrisi Ankaragücü Spor Kulübü
- Short name: AG
- Founded: 31 August 1910; 116 years ago (as Turan Sanatkarangücü)
- Ground: Eryaman Stadium
- Capacity: 20,000
- President: Gazi Ercüment Tekin
- Head coach: Recep Karatepe
- League: TFF 2. Lig
- 2025–26: TFF 2. Lig, White, 6th of 19
- Website: ankaragucu.org.tr
Home colours	Away colours	Third colours

MKE Ankaragücü, officially known as Makina ve Kimya Endüstrisi Ankaragücü (Turkish pronunciation: [ˈaŋkaɾaɟydʒy]), is a Turkish professional sports club based in Ankara. The club is best known for its football team, which competes in the TFF Second League, the third tier of Turkish football. The team plays in a yellow and navy kit and hosts its home matches at the Eryaman Stadium, following the closure of the historic Ankara 19 Mayıs Stadium.

Ankaragücü's most notable domestic achievements include winning the Turkish Football Championship in 1949 and lifting the Turkish Cup in 1972 and 1981. The club has also twice secured promotion as champions of the second tier. Regionally, Ankaragücü claimed six titles in the now-defunct Ankara Football League. The club shares an intense local rivalry with fellow Ankara side Gençlerbirliği.

In addition to football, Ankaragücü maintains departments in cycling, taekwondo, and women's volleyball. The women's volleyball team has competed in the Turkish Women's Volleyball League since the 2009–10 season.

== History ==
=== Early years (1909–1959) ===
Ankaragücü are based in Ankara, but were founded in Zeytinburnu, Istanbul in 1904 as Altınörs İdman Yurdu. The club competed in the Istanbul Friday League. It is unclear as to the motive behind the uprooting of the Istanbul-based club to Ankara. Another theory is that the club splintered, with some players following Şükrü Abbas and others following Agah Orhan. Şükrü Abbas founded Turan Sanatkarangücü in 1910. In 1938, both clubs merged to form AS-FA Gücü. The club name was changed for one last time in 1948, with both sides settling on Ankaragücü. Ankaragücü have won the former Turkish Football Championship in 1949, the greatest success in their history, and reached the third place before in 1924 under the name Anadolu Turan Sanatkarangücü.

Ankaragücü's classic home kit

=== 1. Lig years and relegation (1959–1981) ===
The club were one of the original sixteen clubs in the 1959 Turkish National League. They were admitted into the league after finishing second in the Ankara Professional League. The club finished fifth in the Beyaz Grup (White Group) in the first season of the Milli Lig.

Ankaragücü were relegated to the 2.Lig in 1967–68 after finishing second to last place. The club returned to the top league next season. Ankaragücü were again relegated in the 1975–76 season, but promoted to the 1st League next season. Ankaragücü was relegated for the third time in 1977–1978 season.

=== Back to 1. Lig (1981–2012) ===
Ankaragücü returned to the 1st League in 1981 due to a political decision, towards which the FIFA was still powerless back then. The Turkish President Kenan Evren and Ankara governor Mustafa Gönül wanted a club from the capital in the 1. Lig and thus saw to that the club gained promotion despite only having finished second in the 2nd division, behind Sakaryaspor. Ankaragücü had won the Turkish Cup too. Ankaragücü has played in the 1st League since then. The club was occasionally successful during the 1990s.

Under Ersun Yanal's managership, the club has seen two successful seasons, becoming sixth in the 2000–01 season and fourth in the 2001–02 season. After Ersun Yanal left the club, Ankaragücü found it in a struggle to be saved from relegation each year and were in full-blown and widespread disarray. The club managed to stay clear of relegation at the last few matches during these years. Consequently, a financial crisis hit the club during the late 2000s.

After the economic crisis, Ahmet Gökçek became the chairman replacing Cemal Aydın. He promised that the club would become a champion in upcoming years. He was formerly (informally) associated with Ankaraspor and TFF objected to the control of two clubs at the same time and relegated Ankaraspor. After the relegation of Ankaraspor, he merged the football squads of two teams, but he did not manage to form a squad that would win a championship.

The congress in which Ahmet Gökçek was elected annulled by Turkish court and Cengiz Topel Yıldırım returned to the chairman position. Due to the economic crisis, Cengiz Topel Yıldırım sold key players of the squad and the team was one of the weakest teams of Turkish Super League. Sami Altınyuva became the next chairman but did not solve the financial problems. Due to the ongoing financial crisis, many players left the club. Later, Bent Ahlat, Atilla Süslü and Mehmet Yiğiner became chairmen but the financial problems were not solved.

=== More relegations and promotions (2012-present) ===
Due to financial crisis, the club relegated from Süper Lig in the 2011–2012 season and from PTT 1. Lig in the 2012–2013 season. They returned to the TFF First League after being promoted from the third tier of Turkish football during the 2016–17 season. They got promoted back up to the Süper Lig the following season, where they currently remain.

Ankaragücü finished in the relegation zone in the 2019–2020 Süper Lig, but the Turkish Football Federation voided all relegation due to COVID-19.

On 11 December 2023, MKE Ankaragücü's club president Faruk Koca was arrested after he punched the referee, Halil Umut Meler, who was also kicked repeatedly whilst on the ground; fans also invaded the pitch following a late equaliser by the visiting team, Rizespor. All league football games were suspended in Turkey indefinitely after the incident. The following day, 12 December 2023, Koca resigned as MKE Ankaragücü's club president. On 13 December, Meler was discharged from hospital, and it was agreed that games would resume on 19 December 2023. On 14 December, it was announced that Koca had been issued a permanent ban from football by the Turkish Football Federation, and that Ankaragücü had been fined ₺2 million and ordered to play their next five home games behind closed doors. Ankaragücü was relegated to second level for the sixth time after a 4-2 loss to Trabzonspor at away on 26 May 2024. On 11 November, Koca was convicted and sentenced to 3.5 years' imprisonment for assaulting Meler.

== Special relationship with Bursaspor ==
In the early 1990s Bursaspor's ultra group Teksas had a leader called Abdulkerim Bayraktar. He went to study in Ankara, and whilst in the city he started attending Ankaragücü games and started building ties between the two clubs.

However, in 1993, his life was cut short as during his military service he was killed. This tragic event bought Bursaspor and Ankaragücü even closer together. During the first game after his death, Bursaspor organized a tribute to him, the events which happened next cemented the brotherhood between these two teams. A large group of Ankaragücü supporters made their way onto the pitch and unveiled a large banner reading, 'Our brother Abdul will never die, he lives on in our hearts'. The two supporter groups united and hundreds of Ankaragücü ultras attended his funeral. From that day on Bursaspor supporters would chant Ankaragücü's name in the sixth minute of every home game, number six being significant due to it being Ankara's city code.

Ankaragücü supporters in return chant Bursaspor's name during the 16th minute, 16 being Bursa's city code. When the two sides play, the supporters sit together, which is one of the rare occasions in which ultras from opposing teams watch a game together in a mixed environment, they bring "Bursankara" scarfs (a merger of the two clubs names) to the games and creating an atmosphere of mutual respect.

== Stadium ==
The club currently plays its home matches at Eryaman Stadium, opened in 2019. Ankaragücü's former home, the Ankara 19 Mayıs Stadium, was demolished in 2018. They also currently share the stadium with fellow-Ankara based club and rivals Gençlerbirliği.

== Honours ==
=== National competitions ===
- Turkish Football Championship
  - Winners (1): 1949
- Turkish Cup
  - Winners (2): 1971–72, 1980–81
  - Runners-up (3): 1972–73, 1981–82, 1990–91
- Turkish Super Cup
  - Winners (1): 1981
  - Runners-up (1): 1972
- Prime Minister's Cup:
  - Winners (2): 1969, 1991
- TFF First League
  - Winners (3): 1968–69, 1976–77, 2021-2022

== League participation ==
- Süper Lig: 1959-68 (10 seasons), 1969–76, 1977–78, 1981-2012, 2018–21, 2022–24
- TFF First League: 1968-69, 1976–77, 1978–81, 2012–13, 2017–18, 2021–22, 2024–25,
- TFF Second League: 2013-17, 2025–

=== Regional competitions ===
- Ankara Football League
  - Winners (6): 1924, 1935–36, 1936–37, 1948–49, 1951–52, 1956–57

== European participations ==
As of 3 October 2002

Competition	Pld	W	D	L	GF	GA	GD
UEFA Cup Winners' Cup	6	0	1	5	1	13	–12
UEFA Cup	6	3	0	3	4	8	–4
UEFA Total	12	3	1	8	5	21	–16
Balkans Cup	4	2	1	1	3	1	+2
Overall Total	16	5	2	9	8	22	–14

UEFA Cup Winners' Cup:

Season	Round	Club	Home	Away	Aggregate
1972–73	1R	(England) Leeds United	1–1	0–1	1–2
1973–74	1R	(Scotland) Rangers	0–2	0–4	0–6
1981–82	1R	(Soviet Union) SKA Rostov	0–2	0–3	0–5

UEFA Cup:

Season	Round	Club	Home	Away	Aggregate
1999–2000	QR	(Faroe Islands) B36 Tórshavn	1–0	1–0	2–0
1999–2000	1R	(Spain) Atlético Madrid	1–0	0–3	1–3
2002–03	1R	(Spain) Alavés	1–2	0–3	1–5

Balkans Cup:

Season	Round	Club	Home	Away	Aggregate
1984–85	QF	(Bulgaria) Spartak Varna	2–0	0–0	2–0
1984–85	SF	(Greece) Iraklis	1–0	0–1	1–1(2–4 p)

UEFA Ranking history:

As of 2004

Season	Rank	Points	Ref.
1973	204 ▲	0.500	
1974	203 ▲	0.500	
1975	203	0.500	
1976	201 ▲	0.500	
1977	200 ▲	0.500	
2000	152 ▲	13.925	
2001	133 ▲	16.987	
2002	143 ▼	16.362	
2003	152 ▼	16.495	
2004	155 ▼	12.656	

== Players ==
=== Current squad ===
As of 3 December 2025

Note: Flags indicate national team as defined under FIFA eligibility rules; some limited exceptions apply. Players may hold more than one non-FIFA nationality.

No.	Pos.	Nation	Player
2	DF	TUR	Berat Dolu
3	DF	TUR	Halil İbrahim Pehlivan
4	DF	NED	Özgür Aktaş
5	MF	GER	Mesut Kesik
9	FW	TUR	Atakan Güner
10	MF	TUR	Yusuf Emre Gültekin
15	DF	TUR	Yusuf Eren Göktaş
16	DF	TUR	İsmail Çokçalış
17	FW	TUR	Recep Yiğit Sevinç
19	MF	TUR	Fatih Arhan
20	DF	TUR	Arda Doğan
21	DF	TUR	Mahmut Tekdemir
22	DF	TUR	Mert Can
23	DF	TUR	Hüseyin Sevgili
25	GK	TUR	Ertaç Özbir

No.	Pos.	Nation	Player
27	GK	TUR	Kürşat Gül
28	GK	TUR	Fatih Demir
33	DF	POR	Diogo Coelho
40	MF	TUR	Ahmet Emre Polat
41	FW	TUR	Mervan Yiğit
44	MF	TUR	Bedirhan Karababa
46	DF	TUR	Mehmet Aydoğan
55	FW	TUR	Batuhan Gürsoy
70	MF	AUT	Enes Tepecik
77	DF	TUR	Zahir Ersari
88	MF	TUR	Osman Çelik
90	DF	TUR	Miraç Şimşek
91	GK	TUR	Görkem Cihan
97	MF	TUR	Turgut Yazgan

== See also ==
- List of Turkish sports clubs by foundation dates
- Mechanical and Chemical Industry Corporation

== Club officials ==
Position	Staff
Manager	(Turkey) Recep Karatepe
Assistant Manager	(Turkey) Turgay Yıldırım
Assistant Manager	(Turkey) Cüneyt Ertuğruloğlu
Goalkeeper Coach	(Turkey) Özden Öngün (Turkey) Ali Müslüm Oğras
Fitness Coach	(Turkey) Can Kolbakır (Turkey) Selçuk Tarakçı
Match Analyst	(Turkey) Yağız Çekem (Turkey) Halil Cihan Ünal (Turkey) Tolga Yalçın
