= New Adana Stadium =

Football Stadium in Sarıçam, Adana, Turkey

Coordinates: 37°3′48″N 35°22′30″E

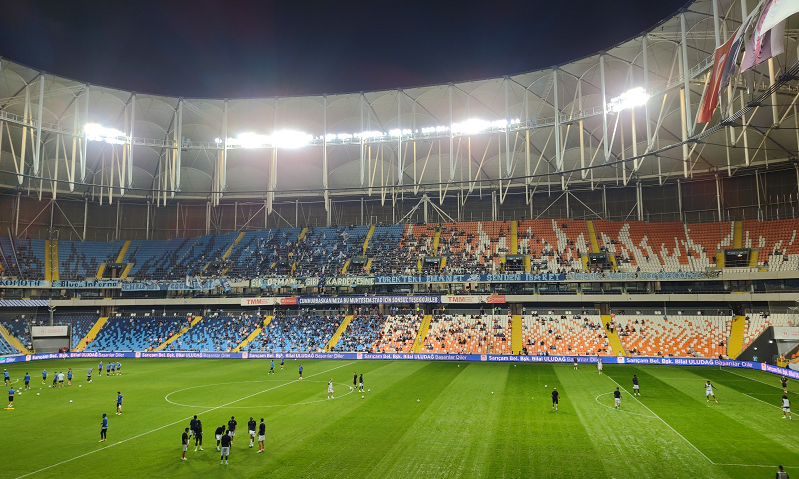
- Interactive map of New Adana Stadium
- Location: Adana, Turkey
- Owner: Ministry of Youth and Sports (Turkey)
- Operator: Adana Demirspor and Adanaspor
- Capacity: 30,960 Capacity history: 33,543 (2021–2024) 27,734 (2024–)
- Executive suites: 54
- Surface: Hybrid turf
- Record attendance: 29,327 (Adana Demirspor–Galatasaray, 1 October 2022)

Construction
- Groundbreaking: 2013
- Built: 2013–2021
- Opened: 19 February 2021
- Cost: $23 million
- Architect: DB Architects

Tenants
- Adana Demirspor; Adanaspor; Turkey national football team (selected matches)

The New Adana Stadium (Turkish: Yeni Adana Stadyumu) is a football-specific stadium in the Sarıçam district of Adana, Turkey. The stadium has a capacity of 30,960 spectators, fully seated and all sheltered. The stadium was inaugurated on 19 February 2021.

== See also ==
- List of football stadiums in Turkey
- Lists of stadiums
