= 2026–27 Beşiktaş J.K. season =

Beşiktaş
2026–27 season
- President: Serdal Adalı
- Head coach: Vincenzo Italiano
- Stadium: Beşiktaş Park
- Süper Lig: 12th
- Turkish Cup: Fifth round
- UEFA Europa League: League phase
- Top goalscorer: League: Dušan Vlahović (5 goals); All: Dušan Vlahović (5 goals)
- Biggest win: Beşiktaş 4–1 Marseille; Beşiktaş 3–0 Kauno Žalgiris; Beşiktaş 3–0 Erzurumspor
Home colours	Away colours	Third colours

The 2026–27 season is the 124th season in the history of Beşiktaş, and the club's 69th consecutive season in the Süper Lig. In addition to the domestic league, the club is participating in the Turkish Cup and the UEFA Europa League.

== Season summary ==
On 6 June 2026, Beşiktaş announced Vincenzo Italiano as their new manager, with the Italian signing a contract at the club until 2028.

== Transfers ==
=== In ===
Date	Pos.	Player	From	Fee	Notes	Ref.
1 July 2026	MF	(Turkey) Orkun Kökçü	(Portugal) Benfica	Undisclosed	Loan made permanent	
2 July 2026	DF	(France) Kassoum Ouattara	Monaco	€8 million		
5 July 2026	MF	(Turkey) İlhan Fakılı	(France) Clermont	Undisclosed		
8 July 2026	GK	(Germany) Alexander Nübel	(Germany) Bayern Munich	Undisclosed		
8 July 2026	GK	(Turkey) Doğan Alemdar	(Turkey) Başakşehir	Undisclosed		
9 July 2026	MF	(Turkey) Salih Özcan	(Germany) Borussia Dortmund	Undisclosed		
15 July 2026	MF	(Belgium) Leandro Trossard	(England) Arsenal	£15.3 million	Includes £1.7 million in potential add-ons	
12 August 2026	FW	(Serbia) Dušan Vlahović	Unattached	Free		
27 August 2026	FW	(Netherlands) Ernest Poku	(Germany) Bayer Leverkusen	€3 million loan	Obligation to buy for €20 million.	
28 August 2026	MF	(Italy) Fabio Miretti	(Italy) Juventus	€2.1 million loan	Option to buy for €13 million.	

== Competitions ==
=== Overall record ===
Competition	First match	Last match	Starting round	Record							
Competition	First match	Last match	Starting round	Pld	W	D	L	GF	GA	GD	Win %
Süper Lig	16 August 2026	TBD	Matchday 1	6	4	0	2	14	7	+7	66.67
Turkish Cup	December 2026	TBD	Fifth round	0	0	0	0	0	0	+0	—
UEFA Europa League	23 July 2026	TBD	Second qualifying round	7	6	0	1	12	2	+10	85.71
Total				13	10	0	3	26	9	+17	76.92

Last updated: 20 September 2026
Source: Competitions

=== Süper Lig ===
==== League table ====
Pos	Team	Pld	W	D	L	GF	GA	GD	Pts	Qualification or relegation
2	Amedspor	9	6	2	1	20	10	+10	20	Qualification for the Champions League third qualifying round
3	Trabzonspor	9	6	1	2	22	8	+14	19	Qualification for the Europa League second qualifying round
4	Beşiktaş	9	6	0	3	18	10	+8	18	Qualification for the Conference League second qualifying round
5	Fenerbahçe	9	5	1	3	23	8	+15	16	
6	Kasımpaşa	9	4	4	1	13	9	+4	16	

Updated to match(es) played on 26 October 2026. Source: Süper Lig
Rules for classification: 1) Points; 2) Head-to-head points; 3) Head-to-head goal difference; 4) Head-to-head goals scored; 5) Goal difference; 6) Goals scored; 7) Play-off.
(Note: Head-to-head record is used only after all the matches between the teams in question have been played)

==== Results summary ====
Overall								Home						Away					
Pld	W	D	L	GF	GA	GD	Pts	W	D	L	GF	GA	GD	W	D	L	GF	GA	GD
9	6	0	3	18	10	+8	18	5	0	0	14	3	+11	1	0	3	4	7	−3

Last updated: 26 October 2026.
Source: TFF.org

Pld = Matches played; W = Matches won; D = Matches drawn; L = Matches lost; GF = Goals for; GA = Goals against; GD = Goal difference; Pts = Points

==== Results by round ====
Round	1	2	3	4	5	6	7	8	9	10	11	12	13	14	15	16	17	18	19	20	21	22	23	24	25	26	27	28	29	30	31	32	33	34
Ground	H	A	H	A	H	A	H	A	H	A	H	A	H	H	A	H	A	A	H	A	H	A	H	A	H	A	H	A	H	A	A	H	A	H
Result	W	L	W	W	W	L	W	L	W																									
Position	4	12	3	2	2	3																												

Updated to match(es) played on 26 October 2026. Source: TFF.org
A = Away; H = Home; W = Win; D = Draw; L = Loss; P = Postponed

==== Matches ====
16 August 2026 1	Beşiktaş	1–0	Eyüpspor	Istanbul
21:30 TRT (UTC+3)	Černý 25'	Report	David Costa (red card) 68'	Stadium: Beşiktaş Stadium; Referee: Oğuzhan Çakır

23 August 2026 2	Alanyaspor	1–0	Beşiktaş	Alanya
21:30 TRT (UTC+3)	Lima 73'	Report		Stadium: Alanya Oba Stadium; Referee: Adnan Deniz Kayatepe

31 August 2026 3	Beşiktaş	6–2	Çorum	Istanbul
21:30 TRT (UTC+3)	Černý 9'; Vlahović 43' (pen.), 59', 66'; Fakılı 73'; Murillo 83'	Report	Diomande 52'; Mahmić 77'	Stadium: Beşiktaş Stadium; Referee: Çağdaş Altay

5 September 2026 4	Fenerbahçe	1–2	Beşiktaş	Istanbul
20:00 TRT (UTC+3)	Skriniar 26'	Report	Yılmaz 38'; Vlahović 73'	Stadium: Şükrü Saraçoğlu Stadium; Referee: Halil Umut Meler

11 September 2026 5	Beşiktaş	3-0	Erzurumspor	Istanbul
20:00 TRT (UTC+3)	Topçu 21'; Trossard 27'; Fakılı 82'	Report		Stadium: Beşiktaş Stadium; Referee: Gürcan Hasova

20 September 2026 6	Amed	3-2	Beşiktaş	Diyarbakır
20:00 TRT (UTC+3)	Gift Orban 14'; Saba 22'; Soyalp 59'	Report	Vlahović 55'; Kökçü 90+8' (pen.)	Stadium: Diyarbakır Stadium; Referee: Ali Şansalan

11 October 2026 7	Beşiktaş	2–1	Kocaelispor	Istanbul
19:00 TRT (UTC+3)	Kökçü 18'; Vlahović 31'; Trossard (yellow card) 78'	Report	Show 27'; Bingöl (yellow card) 29'; Öztaşdelen (yellow card) 78'	Stadium: Beşiktaş Stadium; Referee: Abdullah Buğra Taşkınsoy

19 October 2026 8	Trabzonspor	2–0	Beşiktaş	Trabzon
20:00 TRT (UTC+3)	Tufan 21'; Fabinho (yellow card) 33'; Salah 71'	Report	Miretti (yellow card) 32'; Topçu (yellow card) 60'; Fakılı (yellow card) 85'; Ouattara (yellow card) 90'	Stadium: Papara Park; Referee: Cihan Aydın

26 October 2026 9	Beşiktaş	2–0	İstanbul Başakşehir	Istanbul
19:00 TRT (UTC+3)	Trossard (yellow card) 61'; Oh Hyeon-gyu 76'; Olaitan 89'	Report	Ba (yellow card) 37'; Karbownik (yellow card) 59'	Stadium: Beşiktaş Stadium; Referee: Ümit Öztürk

1 November 2026 10	Kasımpaşa	v	Beşiktaş	Istanbul
19:00 TRT (UTC+3)		Report		Stadium: Recep Tayyip Erdogan Stadium

8 November 2026 11	Beşiktaş	v	Gençlerbirliği	Istanbul
21:00 TRT (UTC+3)		Report		Stadium: Beşiktaş Stadium

22 November 2026 12	Konyaspor	v	Beşiktaş	Konya
16:00 TRT (UTC+3)		Report		Stadium: Konya Municipality Stadium

30 November 2026 13	Beşiktaş	v	Galatasaray	Istanbul
21:00 TRT (UTC+3)		Report		Stadium: Beşiktaş Stadium

6 December 2026 14	Beşiktaş	v	Samsunspor	Istanbul
16:00 TRT (UTC+3)		Report		Stadium: Beşiktaş Stadium

14 December 2026 15	Gaziantep	v	Beşiktaş	Gaziantep
20:00 TRT (UTC+3)		Report		Stadium: Gaziantep Stadium

20 December 2026 16	Beşiktaş	v	Çaykur Rizespor	Istanbul
19:00 TRT (UTC+3)		Report		Stadium: Beşiktaş Stadium

January 2027 17	Göztepe	v	Beşiktaş	İzmir
		Report		Stadium: Gürsel Aksel Stadium

January 2027 18	Eyüpspor	v	Beşiktaş	Istanbul
		Report

January 2027 19	Beşiktaş	v	Alanyaspor	Istanbul
		Report		Stadium: Beşiktaş Stadium

February 2027 20	Çorum	v	Beşiktaş	Çorum
		Report		Stadium: Çorum Şehir Stadium

February 2027 21	Beşiktaş	v	Fenerbahçe	Istanbul
		Report		Stadium: Beşiktaş Stadium

February 2027 22	Erzurumspor	v	Beşiktaş	Erzurum
		Report		Stadium: Kazım Karabekir Stadium

February 2027 23	Beşiktaş	v	Amed	Istanbul
		Report		Stadium: Beşiktaş Stadium

March 2027 24	Kocaelispor	v	Beşiktaş	Kocaeli
		Report		Stadium: Kocaeli Stadium

March 2027 25	Beşiktaş	v	Trabzonspor	Istanbul
		Report		Stadium: Beşiktaş Stadium

March 2027 26	İstanbul Başakşehir	v	Beşiktaş	Istanbul
		Report		Stadium: Başakşehir Fatih Terim Stadium

April 2027 27	Beşiktaş	v	Kasımpaşa	Istanbul
		Report		Stadium: Beşiktaş Stadium

April 2027 28	Gençlerbirliği	v	Beşiktaş	Ankara
		Report		Stadium: Eryaman Stadium

April 2027 29	Beşiktaş	v	Konyaspor	Istanbul
		Report		Stadium: Beşiktaş Stadium

April 2027 30	Galatasaray	v	Beşiktaş	Istanbul
		Report		Stadium: Ali Sami Yen Sports Complex

May 2027 31	Samsunspor	v	Beşiktaş	Samsun
		Report		Stadium: Samsun 19 May Stadium

May 2027 32	Beşiktaş	v	Gaziantep	Istanbul
		Report		Stadium: Beşiktaş Stadium

May 2027 33	Çaykur Rizespor	v	Beşiktaş	Rize
		Report		Stadium: Rize City Stadium

May 2027 34	Beşiktaş	v	Göztepe	Istanbul
		Report		Stadium: Beşiktaş Stadium

=== UEFA Europa League ===
==== Second qualifying round ====
23 July 2026 First leg	Beşiktaş (Turkey)	1–0	(Denmark) Midtjylland	Beşiktaş Stadium, Istanbul
20:00 (21:00 UTC+3)	Kökçü 26'	Report		Attendance: 31,471; Referee: Ricardo de Burgos Bengoetxea (Spain)

30 July 2026 Second leg	Midtjylland (Denmark)	0–2 (0–3 agg.)	(Turkey) Beşiktaş	MCH Arena, Herning
19:00		Report	Rashica 70'; Kökçü 76' (pen.)	Attendance: 10,227; Referee: Ante Čulina (Croatia)

==== Third qualifying round ====
6 August 2026 First leg	Hradec Králové (Czech Republic)	0–1	(Turkey) Beşiktaş	Malšovická aréna, Hradec Králové
19:00		Report	Kılıçsoy 80'	Attendance: 9,300; Referee: Horațiu Feșnic (Romania)

13 August 2026 Second leg	Beşiktaş (Turkey)	1–0 (2–0 agg.)	(Czech Republic) Hradec Králové	Beşiktaş Stadium, Istanbul
19:00 (20:00 UTC+3)	Černý 40'	Report		Attendance: 30,929; Referee: Urs Schnyder (Switzerland)

==== Play-off round ====
20 August 2026 First leg	Beşiktaş (Turkey)	3–0	(Lithuania) Kauno Žalgiris	Beşiktaş Stadium, Istanbul
19:00 (20:00 UTC+3)	Oh Hyeon-gyu 6'; Murillo 12'; Kökçü 59' (pen.)	Report		Attendance: 31,494; Referee: Tobias Stieler (Germany)

27 August 2026 Second leg	Kauno Žalgiris (Lithuania)	1–0 (3–1 agg.)	(Turkey) Beşiktaş	Darius and Girėnas Stadium, Kaunas
19:00 (20:00 UTC+3)	Kalik (yellow card) 28'; Renan Oliveira 64'	Report	Yılmaz (yellow card) 85'	Attendance: 7,079; Referee: Jesús Gil Manzano (Spain)

==== League phase ====
The draw for the league phase was held on 28 August 2026.

Pos	Team	Pld	W	D	L	GF	GA	GD	Pts	Qualification
6	(Greece) Olympiacos	4	3	1	0	4	1	+3	10	Advance to round of 16 (seeded)
7	(Germany) Bayer Leverkusen	4	3	0	1	8	1	+7	9	Advance to round of 16 (seeded)
8	(Turkey) Beşiktaş	4	2	1	1	11	8	+3	7	Advance to round of 16 (seeded)
9	(Croatia) Dinamo Zagreb	4	2	1	1	5	4	+1	7	Advance to knockout phase play-offs (seeded)
10	(Bulgaria) Levski Sofia	4	2	1	1	4	3	+1	7	Advance to knockout phase play-offs (seeded)

Updated to match(es) played on 5 November 2026. Source: UEFA
Rules for classification: League phase tiebreakers

Round	1	2	3	4	5	6	7	8
Ground	H	A	H	A	H	A	H	A
Result	W	W	D	L				
Position	4	4	8	8				

Updated to match(es) played on 5 November 2026. Source: UEFA
A = Away; H = Home; W = Win; D = Draw; L = Loss

17 September 2026 1	Beşiktaş (Turkey)	4–1	(France) Marseille	Istanbul, Turkey
22:00 TRT (UTC+3)	Agbadou (yellow card) 10'; Fakılı 15'; Černý 56'; Murillo 59'; Poku 81'; Miretti (yellow card) 90+5'	Report	Abdallah 29'; Harit (yellow card) 72'	Stadium: Beşiktaş Stadium; Referee: Andrea Colombo (Italy)

15 October 2026 2	Hoffenheim (Germany)	2–3	(Turkey) Beşiktaş	Sinsheim, Germany
22:00 TRT (UTC+3)	Asllani (yellow card) 23', (goal) 68'; Kabak (yellow card) 67'; Machida 87', (yellow card) 90+2'; Lemperle (yellow card) 90'	Report	Murillo 60'; Oh Hyeon-gyu 72', 79', (yellow card) 80'	Stadium: SNP Arena; Referee: Lawrence Visser (Belgium)

22 October 2026 3	Beşiktaş (Turkey)	2–2	(England) Crystal Palace	Istanbul, Turkey
22:00 TRT	Ndidi (yellow card) 15', (goal) 45+2'; Olaitan 73'; Akdağ (yellow card) 66' (yellow-red card) 77'	Report	Pino (yellow card) 45+1', (goal) 51'; Mateta 55'	Stadium: Beşiktaş Park; Referee: Danny Makkelie (Netherlands)

5 November 2026 4	Celtic (Scotland)	3–2	(Turkey) Beşiktaş	Glasgow, Scotland
20:00 GMT	Nygren (yellow card) 60'; Osmand 62'; Durán 78', 87'	Report	Olaitan (penalty missed) 54', 54'; Kökçü 86'; Murillo (yellow card) 90+4'; Topçu (yellow card) 90+5'	Stadium: Celtic Park; Referee: Sascha Stegemann (Germany)

26 November 2026 5	Beşiktaş (Turkey)	v	(Israel) Hapoel Be'er Sheva	Istanbul, Turkey
19:45 TRT		Report		Stadium: Beşiktaş Park

10 December 2026 6	Bayer Leverkusen (Germany)	v	(Turkey) Beşiktaş	Leverkusen, Germany
22:00 TRT		Report		Stadium: BayArena

21 January 2027 7	Beşiktaş (Turkey)	v	(Belgium) Union Saint-Gilloise	Istanbul, Turkey
19:45 TRT		Report		Stadium: Beşiktaş Park

28 January 2027 8	Omonia (Cyprus)	v	(Turkey) Beşiktaş	Nicosia, Cyprus
22:00 TRT		Report		Stadium: GSP Stadium
