= 2024–25 Beşiktaş J.K. season =

Beşiktaş
2024–25 season
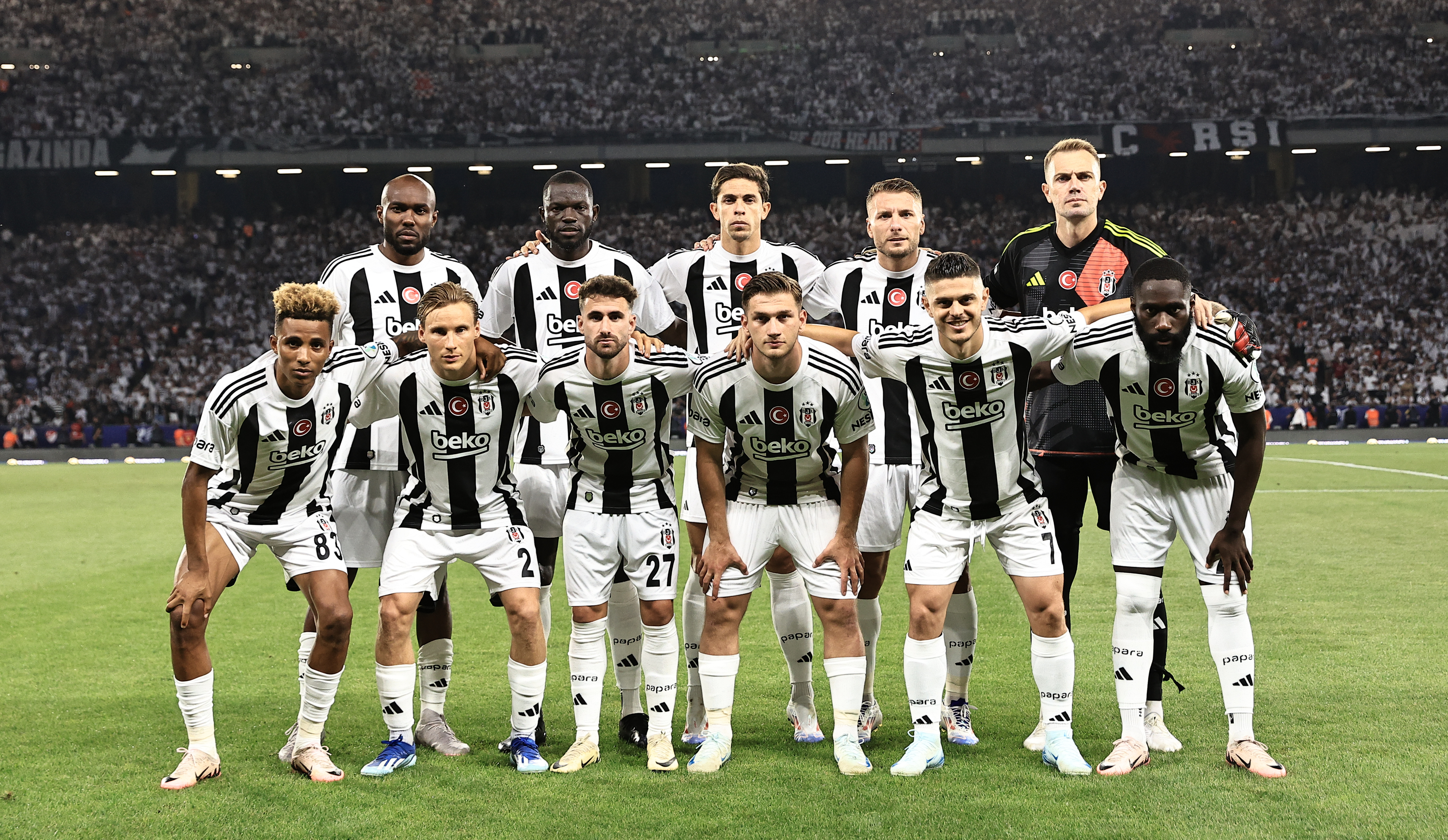
- President: Hasan Arat (until 29 November); Hüseyin Yücel (from 29 November to 29 December); Serdal Adalı (from 29 December)
- Head coach: Giovanni van Bronckhorst (until 30 November); Serdar Topraktepe (interim, from 30 November to 17 January); Ole Gunnar Solskjær (from 17 January)
- Stadium: Beşiktaş Park
- Süper Lig: 4th
- Turkish Cup: Quarter-finals
- Turkish Super Cup: Winners
- UEFA Europa League: League phase
- Top goalscorer: League: Ciro Immobile (15); All: Ciro Immobile (19)
- Highest home attendance: 38,321 vs Fenerbahçe
- Lowest home attendance: 16,042 vs Alanyaspor
- Average home league attendance: 28,393
- Biggest win: Galatasaray 0–5 Beşiktaş
- Biggest defeat: Ajax 4–0 Beşiktaş
Home colours	Away colours	Third colours

The 2024–25 season was the 122nd season in the history of Beşiktaş, and the club's 67th consecutive season in the Süper Lig. In addition to the domestic league, the club participated in the Turkish Cup, the Turkish Super Cup, and the UEFA Europa League.

On 5 June 2024, the Istanbul-based club unveiled Dutch manager Giovanni van Bronckhorst. He was relieved of his duties in late November following the team's drop to sixth position in the league standings.

On 18 January 2025, Besiktas appointed Ole Gunnar Solskjær as head coach on a one-and-a-half-year contract.

== Friendlies ==
=== Pre-season ===
6 July 2024 Friendly	Beşiktaş	0–0	Ümraniyespor	Istanbul
				Stadium: BJK Nevzat Demir Tesisleri

13 July 2024 Friendly	GNK Dinamo Zagreb	v	Beşiktaş	Lendava, Slovenia
17:30 UTC+2				Stadium: Lendava Sports Park
Note: The match was cancelled due to the weather.

17 July 2024 Friendly	Beşiktaş	0–1	FC Shakhtar Donetsk	Radomlje, Slovenia
			Eguinaldo 66'	Stadium: Sports Park Radomlje

20 July 2024 Friendly	Grazer AK	1–5	Beşiktaş	Wildon, Austria
18:00	Lang 3'		Hekimoğlu 10', 12'; Rashica 20', 51'; Silva 26'	Stadium: Stadion Wildon

24 July 2024 Friendly	Beşiktaş	0–0	Bandırmaspor	Istanbul
18:00 UTC+3				Stadium: BJK Nevzat Demir Tesisleri

27 July 2024 Friendly	Beşiktaş	2–0	Gençlerbirliği	İzmit
20:00 UTC+3	Silva 37', 45+1'			Stadium: Kocaeli Stadium

30 July 2024 Friendly	Beşiktaş	2–1	Sakaryaspor	Istanbul
18:00 UTC+3	Muleka 44'; Hekimoğlu 82'		Tıknaz 39'	Stadium: BJK Nevzat Demir Tesisleri

=== Mid-season ===
23 March 2025 Friendly	Beşiktaş	1–3	Istanbulspor	Istanbul
	Paulista 50'		Gültekin 42'; Diarra 85'; Loshaj 90' (pen.)	Stadium: BJK Nevzat Demir Tesisleri

== Competitions ==
=== Overall record ===
Competition	First match	Last match	Starting round	Final position	Record							
Competition	First match	Last match	Starting round	Final position	Pld	W	D	L	GF	GA	GD	Win %
Süper Lig	11 August 2024	1 June 2025	Matchday 1		27	13	8	6	41	27	+14	48.15
Turkish Cup	7 January 2025		Group stage		3	3	0	0	5	1	+4	100.00
Turkish Super Cup	3 August 2024		Final	Winners	1	1	0	0	5	0	+5	100.00
UEFA Europa League	22 August 2024		Play-off round	League phase	10	4	1	5	18	19	−1	40.00
Total					41	21	9	11	69	47	+22	51.22

Last updated: 18 January 2025
Source: Soccerway

=== Süper Lig ===
==== League table ====
Pos	Team	Pld	W	D	L	GF	GA	GD	Pts	Qualification or relegation
2	Fenerbahçe	36	26	6	4	90	39	+51	84	Qualification for the Champions League third qualifying round
3	Samsunspor	36	19	7	10	55	41	+14	64	Qualification for the Europa League play-off round (Note: The 2024–25 Turkish Cup winners qualified for the Europa League play-off round. Since the cup winners (Galatasaray) qualified based on league position, the Europa League play-off round spot was passed to the third-placed team, the Europa League second round spot was passed to the fourth-placed team, and the Conference League spot was passed to the fifth-placed team.)
4	Beşiktaş	36	17	11	8	59	36	+23	62	Qualification for the Europa League second qualifying round
5	Başakşehir	36	16	6	14	60	56	+4	54	Qualification for the Conference League second qualifying round
6	Eyüpspor	36	15	8	13	52	47	+5	53	

Source: Süper Lig
Rules for classification: 1) Points; 2) Head-to-head points; 3) Head-to-head goal difference; 4) Head-to-head goals scored; 5) Goal difference; 6) Goals scored; 7) Play-off.
(Note: Head-to-head record is used only after all the matches between the teams in question have been played)

==== Results summary ====
Overall								Home						Away					
Pld	W	D	L	GF	GA	GD	Pts	W	D	L	GF	GA	GD	W	D	L	GF	GA	GD
19	8	7	4	28	20	+8	31	6	2	2	17	12	+5	2	5	2	11	8	+3

Last updated: 18 January 2025.
Source: Süper Lig

==== Results by round ====
Round	1	2	3	4	5	6	7	8	9	10	11	12	13	14	15	16	17	18	19	20	21	22	23	24	25	26	27	28	29
Ground	A	H	B	H	A	H	A	A	H	A	H	A	H	A	H	A	H	A	H	H	A	B	A	H	A	H	H	A	H
Result	W	W	B	W	D	W	W	D	W	L	L	D	L	D	W	L	D	D	W	D	D	B	W	W	W	W	L	L	W
Position	1	1	3	3	4	3	3	3	2	4	4	5	6	5	5	5	6	6	6	6	6	7	6	5	4	4	4	4	4

Updated to match(es) played on 08 February 2025. Source: Süper Lig
A = Away; H = Home; W = Win; D = Draw; L = Loss

==== Matches ====
The league schedule was released on 11 July 2024.

11 August 2024 1	Samsunspor	0–2	Beşiktaş	Samsun
21:45 UTC+3	Muja (yellow card) 21'; Van Drongelen (yellow card) 45+2'	Report	Masuaku (yellow card) 17'; Silva 31'; Gabriel Paulista 36'	Stadium: Samsun 19 Mayıs Stadium; Attendance: 20,290; Referee: Ali Şansalan

18 August 2024 2	Beşiktaş	4–2	Antalyaspor	Beşiktaş
21:45 UTC+3	Immobile 13', 23'; Colley (yellow card) 49'; Kılıçsoy (yellow card) 55'; Silva 56'; Masuaku (yellow card) 67'; Al-Musrati (yellow card) 89'; Muçi 90+5'	Report	Samudio 1', 51'; Vural (red card) 63'; Kelven (yellow card) 76'	Stadium: Beşiktaş Park; Attendance: 32,966; Referee: Mehmet Türkmen

3	Bye

1 September 2024 4	Beşiktaş	2–0	Sivasspor	Beşiktaş
21:45 UTC+3	Immobile (yellow card) 5', (goal) 27' (pen.); Al-Musrati (yellow card) 59'; Rashica (yellow card) 72'; Gedson 89'; Topçu (yellow card) 90+4'	Report	Paluli (yellow card) 41'; Çiftçi (yellow card) 44'; Vural (yellow card) 89'; Manaj (yellow card) 90+4'; Sonko Sundberg (yellow card) 90+5'	Stadium: Beşiktaş Park; Attendance: 30,197; Referee: Direnç Tonusluoğlu

15 September 2024 5	Trabzonspor	1–1	Beşiktaş	Trabzon
20:00 UTC+3	Višća (red card) 13'; Yokuşlu 17'; Bardhi (yellow card) 45+4'; Çakır (yellow card) 84'	Report	Masuaku (yellow card) 15'; Silva 39'; Al-Musrati (yellow card) 45+4'; Günok (yellow card) 77'	Stadium: Papara Park; Attendance: 35,499; Referee: Ali Şansalan

22 September 2024 6	Beşiktaş	2–1	Eyüpspor	Beşiktaş
20:00 UTC+3	Rashica 20'; Masuaku (yellow card) 90'; Immobile 90+3' (pen.)	Report	Yalçın (yellow card) 6'; Akbaba 64' (pen.); Midtsjø (yellow card) 87'; Thiam (yellow card) 90'; Akbunar (yellow card) 90+9'	Stadium: Beşiktaş Park; Attendance: 33,116; Referee: Zorbay Küçük

30 September 2024 7	Kayserispor	0–3	Beşiktaş	Kayseri
20:00 UTC+3		Report	Gedson 56'; Immobile 78' (pen.), 90+1'	Stadium: Kadir Has Stadium; Attendance: 11,026; Referee: Atilla Karaoğlan

6 October 2024 8	Gaziantep	1–1	Beşiktaş	Gaziantep
19:00 UTC+3	Maxim 90+5'	Report	Immobile 31' (pen.)	Stadium: Gaziantep Stadium; Attendance: 16,158; Referee: Muhammet Ali Metoğlu

20 October 2024 9	Beşiktaş	2–0	Konyaspor	Beşiktaş
16:00 UTC+3	Immobile 29' (pen.); Silva 45+2'	Report		Stadium: Beşiktaş Park; Attendance: 37,328; Referee: Kadir Sağlam

28 October 2024 10	Galatasaray	2–1	Beşiktaş	Sarıyer
20:00 UTC+3	Sánchez 13', (yellow card) 62'; Ayhan (yellow card) 36'; Alper Yılmaz (yellow card) 45+1'; Osimhen 67'; Torreira (yellow card) 80'	Report	Destanoğlu (yellow card) 67'; Topçu (yellow card) 82'; Immobile (yellow card) 89'; Muçi 90+4'	Stadium: Rams Park; Attendance: 54,119; Referee: Arda Kardeşler

2 November 2024 11	Beşiktaş	1–3	Kasımpaşa	Beşiktaş
19:00 UTC+3	Topçu (yellow card) 28'; Muçi 90+3'	Report	Barák (yellow card) 37'; Winck 54'; Ben Ouanes (yellow card) 64'; Da Costa (yellow card) 65' (yellow-red card) 90+2'; Özcan (yellow card) 68'; Kara 70'; Rodrigues (yellow card) 83'; Fall 88'	Stadium: Beşiktaş Park; Attendance: 30,577; Referee: Zorbay Küçük

10 November 2024 12	İstanbul Başakşehir	0–0	Beşiktaş	Başakşehir
19:00 UTC+3	Crespo (yellow card) 45+1'; Opoku (yellow card) 65'; Şengezer (yellow card) 90+2'	Report	Gedson (yellow card) 20'; Svensson (yellow card) 88'; Günok (yellow card) 90+6'	Stadium: Başakşehir Fatih Terim Stadium; Attendance: 4,799; Referee: Turgut Doman

24 November 2024 13	Beşiktaş	2–4	Göztepe	Beşiktaş
19:00 UTC+3	Kılıçsoy 3'; Bokele 9' (o.g.); Svensson (yellow card) 64'	Report	Bokele 12'; Altıkardeş 32'; Fofana 82'; Tijanić 90+1'	Stadium: Beşiktaş Park; Attendance: 26,740; Referee: Alper Akarsu

2 December 2024 14	Hatayspor	1–1	Beşiktaş	Mersin
20:00 UTC+3	Sağlam 29', (yellow card) 57'; Kardeşler (yellow card) 42'; Pedro (yellow card) 44'; Rivas (yellow card) 53'; Aboubakar (yellow card) 58'; Çörekçi (yellow card) 61'; Diack (yellow card) 62'; Sertel (yellow card) 73'; Parmak (yellow card) 86'	Report	Immobile 41'; Uçan (yellow card) 56'; Silva (yellow card) 65'; Destanoğlu (yellow card) 87'	Stadium: Mersin Stadium; Attendance: 16,356; Referee: Kadir Sağlam

7 December 2024 15	Beşiktaş	1–0	Fenerbahçe	Beşiktaş
19:00 UTC+3	Gedson (yellow card) 32' (yellow-red card) 90+6'; Oxlade-Chamberlain 73'	Report	Djiku (yellow card) 89'	Stadium: Beşiktaş Park; Attendance: 38,321; Referee: Mehmet Türkmen

16 December 2024 16	Adana Demirspor	2–1	Beşiktaş	Adana
19:00 UTC+3	Barası 31'; Aimbetov 39'; Maestro (yellow card) 57'; Çelik (yellow card) 70'; Aydoğan (yellow card) 90+3'	Report	Topçu (yellow card) 17'; Al-Musrati 72'; Sanuç (red card) 76'	Stadium: New Adana Stadium; Attendance: 10,280; Referee: Oğuzhan Çakır

21 December 2024 17	Beşiktaş	1–1	Alanyaspor	Beşiktaş
19:00 UTC+3	Silva 7'; Hekimoğlu (yellow card) 90+3'	Report	Lima 5', (yellow card) 68'; Özdemir (yellow card) 88'	Stadium: Beşiktaş Park; Attendance: 16,042; Referee: Cihan Aydın

3 January 2025 18	Çaykur Rizespor	1–1	Beşiktaş	Rize
20:00 UTC+3	Gedson 38' (o.g.)	Report	Muçi 45+3'	Stadium: Rize City Stadium; Attendance: 8,580; Referee: Ozan Ergün

11 January 2025 19	Beşiktaş	2–1	Bodrum	Beşiktaş
19:00 UTC+3	Ndour 32'; Immobile 40'	Report	Pușcaș 90+4'	Stadium: Beşiktaş Park; Attendance: 20,965; Referee: Mehmet Türkmen

18 January 2025 20	Beşiktaş	0–0	Samsunspor	Beşiktaş
19:00 UTC+3		Report		Stadium: Beşiktaş Park; Referee: Kadir Sağlam

26 January 2025 21	Antalyaspor	1–1	Beşiktaş	Antalya
16:00 UTC+3	Rakip 85'	Report	Silva 79'	Stadium: Antalya Stadium; Referee: Oğuzhan Çakir

22	Bye

8 February 2025 23	Sivasspor	0–2	Beşiktaş	Sivas
19:00 UTC+3		Report	Topçu 42'; Mário 90+4' (pen.)	Stadium: New Sivas 4 Eylül Stadium; Referee: Oğuzhan Çakir

15 February 2025 24	Beşiktaş	2–1	Trabzonspor	Beşiktaş
19:00 UTC+3	Silva 53'; Batagov 65' (o.g.)	Report	Banza 17'	Stadium: Beşiktaş Park; Referee: Cihan Aydin

21 February 2025 25	Eyüpspor	1–3	Beşiktaş	Eyüpsultan
20:00 UTC+3	Bingöl 1'	Report	Silva 18'; Milot Rashica 45+2'; Kılıçsoy 60'	Stadium: Eyüp Stadium; Referee: Muhammet Ali Metoğlu

1 March 2025 26	Beşiktaş	2–0	Kayserispor	Beşiktaş
20:30 UTC+3	Mário 45'; Kılıçsoy 90+7' (pen.)	Report		Stadium: Beşiktaş Park; Referee: Halil Umut Meler

10 March 2025 27	Beşiktaş	1–2	Gaziantep	Beşiktaş
20:30 UTC+3	Immobile 31' (pen.)	Report	Kızıldağ 61'; Viana (red card) 77'; Soyalp 87'	Stadium: Beşiktaş Park; Referee: Zorbay Küçük

15 March 2025 28	Konyaspor	1–0	Beşiktaş	Konya
20:30 UTC+3	Bostan (red card) 27'; Yazğılı 45'; Ndao (red card) 64'	Report		Stadium: Konya Metropolitan Municipality Stadium; Referee: Ali Şansalan

29 March 2025 29	Beşiktaş	2–1	Galatasaray	Beşiktaş
20:30 UTC+3	Silva 23'; Fernandes 66'; Kılıçsoy (red card) 90+6'	Report	Torreira 45'; Frankowski (red card) 36'	Stadium: Beşiktaş Park; Referee: Yasin Kol

07 April 2025 30	Kasimpasa	1–1	Beşiktaş	Beşiktaş
20:30 UTC+3		Report		Stadium: Beşiktaş Park; Referee: Yasin Kol

=== Turkish Cup ===
==== Group stage ====
Pos	Team	Pld	W	D	L	GF	GA	GD	Pts
1	Beşiktaş	3	3	0	0	5	1	+4	9
2	Bodrum	3	2	1	0	8	5	+3	7
3	Kocaelispor	3	2	0	1	7	4	+3	6
4	Antalyaspor	3	1	0	2	5	6	−1	3
5	Kırklarelispor	3	0	1	2	5	9	−4	1
6	Sivasspor	3	0	0	3	0	5	−5	0

7 January 2025 1	Sivasspor	0–1	Beşiktaş	Sivas
19:00 UTC+3		Report	Silva 20'	Stadium: New Sivas 4 Eylül Stadium; Referee: Halil Umut Meler

4 February 2025 2	Beşiktaş	2–0	Kırklarelispor	Beşiktaş
19:00 UTC+3	Muçi 62'; Mário 79'	Report		Stadium: Beşiktaş Park; Referee: Ozan Ergün

25 February 2025 3	Antalyaspor	1–2	Beşiktaş	Antalya
	Milošević 64'	Report	Arroyo 10'; Silva 76'	Stadium: Antalya Stadium; Referee: Yiğit Arslan

==== Knockout Stage ====
3 April 2025 Quarter-Finals	Beşiktaş	1–3	Göztepe	Beşiktaş
	Muçi 30'; Sanuç (red card) 36'	Report	Cardoso 38', 78' (pen.), 81'	Stadium: Beşiktaş Park; Referee: Atilla Karaoğlan

=== Turkish Super Cup ===
3 August 2024 Final	Galatasaray	0–5	Beşiktaş	Istanbul
20:45	Kutlu (yellow card) 17'; Torreira (yellow card) 20'; Aktürkoğlu (yellow card) 42'; Yılmaz (yellow card) 73'; Nelsson (red card) 87'	Report	Immobile 1', 80' (pen.), (yellow card) 47'; Colley (yellow card) 11'; Kılıçsoy (yellow card) 20'; Svensson 53'; Gedson (yellow card) 73'; Silva 90'; Hekimoğlu 90+2'	Stadium: Atatürk Olympic Stadium; Referee: Atilla Karaoğlan

=== UEFA Europa League ===
22 August 2024 First leg	Lugano (Switzerland)	3–3	(Turkey) Beşiktaş	Thun, Switzerland
20:30 UTC+2	Bislimi 34'; Steffen 56'; Gabriel Paulista 63' (o.g.)	Report	Gedson 21', 51'; Al-Musrati 55'	Stadium: Stockhorn Arena; Attendance: 5,270; Referee: Morten Krogh (Denmark)

29 August 2024 Second leg	Beşiktaş (Turkey)	5–1 (8–4 agg.)	(Switzerland) Lugano	Istanbul
21:00 UTC+3	Immobile 7', 71'; Gedson 65'; Silva 70'; Uçan 90+2'	Report	Vladi 59'	Stadium: Beşiktaş Park; Attendance: 35,370; Referee: Radu Petrescu (Romania)

==== League phase ====
Pos	Team	Pld	W	D	L	GF	GA	GD	Pts
26	(Swedish Football Association) IF Elfsborg	8	3	1	4	9	14	−5	10
27	(German Football Association) TSG Hoffenheim	8	2	3	3	11	14	−3	9
28	(Turkish Football Federation) Beşiktaş	8	3	0	5	10	15	−5	9
29	(Israel Football Association) Maccabi Tel Aviv	8	2	0	6	8	17	−9	6
30	(Football Association of the Czech Republic) Slavia Prague	8	1	2	5	7	11	−4	5

Source: UEFA
Rules for classification: League phase tiebreakers

Round	1	2	3	4	5	6	7	8
Ground	A	H	A	H	H	A	H	A
Result	L	L	W	W	L	L	W	L
Position	36	36	27	18	22	28	24	28

Updated to match(es) played on 30 January 2025. Source: UEFA
A = Away; H = Home; W = Win; D = Draw; L = Loss

26 September 2024 1	Ajax (Netherlands)	4–0	(Turkey) Beşiktaş	Amsterdam, Netherlands
21:00 UTC+2	Fitz-Jim (yellow card) 21', (goal) 31'; Hato (yellow card) 46'; Godts 51', 73'; Taylor 55'	Report	Hekimoğlu (yellow card) 45+1'; Onana (yellow card) 51'	Stadium: Johan Cruyff Arena; Attendance: 54,010; Referee: John Brooks (England)

3 October 2024 2	Beşiktaş (Turkey)	1–3	(Germany) Eintracht Frankfurt	Istanbul
22:00 UTC+3	Uduokhai (yellow card) 17'; Immobile (penalty missed) 27', (yellow card) 33'; Ndour (yellow card) 56'; Masuaku 90+3'	Report	Marmoush 19' (pen.); Dina Ebimbe 22'; Koch (yellow card) 48'; Nkounkou (yellow card) 67'; Knauff 82'; Ekitike (yellow card) 90+1'	Stadium: Beşiktaş Park; Attendance: 35,305; Referee: John Beaton (Scotland)

24 October 2024 3	Lyon (France)	0–1	(Turkey) Beşiktaş	Décines-Charpieu, France
21:00 UTC+2	Tolisso (yellow card) 41'; Tessmann (yellow card) 61'	Report	Topçu (yellow card) 28'; Masuaku (yellow card) 45+6'; João Mário (yellow card) 70'; Gedson 71'; Destanoğlu (yellow card) 83'; Silva (yellow card) 83'; Kılıçsoy (yellow card) 84'	Stadium: Groupama Stadium; Attendance: 27,350; Referee: Harm Osmers (Germany)

6 November 2024 4	Beşiktaş (Turkey)	2–1	(Sweden) Malmö FF	Istanbul
18:30 UTC+3	Masuaku (yellow card) 45+2'; Gabriel Paulista (yellow card) 69'; Muçi 76'; Kılıçsoy 85', (yellow card) 90+6'	Report	Peña (yellow card) 30'; Jansson (yellow card) 90+3'; Rieks 90+3'	Stadium: Beşiktaş Park; Attendance: 24,652; Referee: Sven Jablonski (Germany)

28 November 2024 5	Beşiktaş (Turkey)	1–3	(Israel) Maccabi Tel Aviv	Debrecen, Hungary (Note: Due to a strain on Israel–Turkey relations related to the Gaza war, Turkish authorities requested the Beşiktaş v Maccabi Tel Aviv match be played outside of Turkey at a neutral venue. Therefore, Beşiktaş will play this home match at Nagyerdei Stadion, Debrecen, Hungary, instead of their regular stadium, Beşiktaş Park, Istanbul. Following a request from local authorities, it will also be played behind closed doors.)
18:45 UTC+1	Silva 38'	Report	Kanichowsky 23'; Peretz 45+3'; Patati 81'	Stadium: Nagyerdei Stadion; Attendance: 0 Referee: Simone Sozza (Italy)

12 December 2024 6	Bodø/Glimt (Norway)	2–1	(Turkey) Beşiktaş	Bodø, Norway
21:00 UTC+2	Zinckernagel 37'; Bjørtuft 43'		Gedson 21'	Stadium: Aspmyra Stadion; Attendance: 5,813; Referee: Filip Glova (Slovakia)

22 January 2025 7	Beşiktaş (Turkey)	4–1	(Spain) Athletic Bilbao	Istanbul
18:30 UTC+3	Rashica 17', 60', (yellow card) 66'; Immobile (yellow card) 37'; Masuaku (yellow card) 45+1'; Silva 77'; João Mário 90+2' (pen.)	Report	Gómez 45'	Stadium: Beşiktaş Park; Attendance: 35,980; Referee: Julian Weinberger (Austria)

30 January 2025 8	Twente (Netherlands)	1–0	(Turkey) Beşiktaş	Enschede, Netherlands
21:00 UTC+2	Salah-Eddine (yellow card) 6'; Rots 76'	Report	Svensson (yellow card) 18'; Immobile (yellow card) 37'; Rashica (yellow card) 54'; Topçu (yellow card) 66'	Stadium: De Grolsch Veste; Attendance: 28,500; Referee: Szymon Marciniak (Poland)

== Statistics ==
=== Goalscorers ===
Rank	Pos.	Player	Süper Lig	Turkish Cup	Super Cup	Europa League	Total
1	FW	(Italy) Ciro Immobile	15	0	2	2	19
2	MF	(Portugal) Rafa Silva	12	2	1	3	18
3	MF	(Portugal) Gedson Fernandes	7	0	0	5	12
4	MF	(Albania) Ernest Muçi	4	2	0	1	7
4	MF	(Portugal) João Mário	5	1	0	1	7
5	MF	(Kosovo) Milot Rashica	3	0	0	2	5
6	FW	(Turkey) Semih Kılıçsoy	3	0	0	1	4
7	FW	(Turkey) Mustafa Erhan Hekimoğlu	2	0	1	0	3
8	MF	(Libya) Al-Musrati	1	0	0	1	2
8	MF	(Ecuador) Keny Arroyo	1	1	0	0	2
9	MF	(Brazil) Gabriel Paulista	1	0	0	0	1
9	DF	(Democratic Republic of the Congo) Arthur Masuaku	0	0	0	1	1
9	MF	(Italy) Cher Ndour	1	0	0	0	1
9	MF	(England) Alex Oxlade-Chamberlain	1	0	0	0	1
9	DF	(Norway) Jonas Svensson	0	0	1	0	1
9	MF	(Turkey) Salih Uçan	0	0	0	1	1
9	DF	(Turkey) Emirhan Topçu	1	0	0	0	1
Own goals			2	0	0	0	2
Totals			59	6	5	18	88

Last updated: 1 June 2025.
Source: Global Sports Archive

== Transfers ==
=== In ===
Pos.	Player	Transferred from	Fee	Date	Source
FW	(Turkey) Oğuzhan Akgün	(Turkey) Sarıyer	Loan return	30 June 2024	
DF	(Turkey) Bilal Ceylan	(Turkey) Karşıyaka	Loan return	30 June 2024	
DF	(Libya) Al-Musrati	(Portugal) Braga	€11,000,000	1 July 2024	
DF	(Brazil) Gabriel Paulista	(Spain) Atlético Madrid	Free	1 July 2024	
FW	(Portugal) Rafa Silva	(Portugal) Benfica	Free	1 July 2024	
FW	(Italy) Ciro Immobile	(Italy) Lazio	Undisclosed	13 July 2024	
MF	(Austria) Can Keleş	Austria Wien	€2,500,000	22 July 2024	
DF	(Turkey) Emirhan Topçu	(Turkey) Çaykur Rizespor	€3,400,000	2 August 2024	
MF	(Italy) Cher Ndour	(France) Paris Saint-Germain	Loan	13 August 2024	
DF	(Germany) Felix Uduokhai	(Germany) FC Augsburg	Loan	27 August 2024	
MF	(Portugal) João Mário	(Portugal) Benfica	Loan	4 September 2024	
DF	(Turkey) Aytuğ Batur Kömeç	(Serbia) FK IMT	Loan return	10 September 2024	

=== Out ===
Pos.	Player	Transferred to	Fee	Date	Source
MF	(Switzerland) Gökhan Inler	Retired	End of contract	1 July 2024	
MF	(Algeria) Rachid Ghezzal	(Turkey) Çaykur Rizespor	End of contract	1 July 2024	
FW	(Turkey) Cenk Tosun	(Turkey) Fenerbahçe	End of contract	1 July 2024	
DF	(France) Valentin Rosier	(Spain) Leganés	Contract termination	5 July 2024	
DF	(Turkey) Aytuğ Batur Kömeç	(Serbia) FK IMT	Loan	13 July 2024	
DF	(Turkey) Ahmet Gülay	(Turkey) Balikesirspor	Undisclosed	16 July 2024	
MF	(Turkey) Kerem Atakan Kesgin	(Turkey) Bandırmaspor	Loan	17 July 2024	
MF	(Turkey) Abdülmecid Dönmez	(Turkey) Adana 01 FK	Loan	19 July 2024	
DF	(Turkey) Bilal Ceylan	(Turkey) Serik Belediyespor	Undisclosed	19 July 2024	
DF	(Turkey) Tayfur Bingöl	(Turkey) Eyüpspor	Loan	30 July 2024	
FW	(Croatia) Ante Rebić	(Italy) Lecce	Contract termination	31 July 2024	
MF	(Bosnia and Herzegovina) Ajdin Hasić	(Poland) KS Cracovia	Undisclosed	1 August 2024	
MF	(Turkey) Halil Çiçek	(Turkey) Niğde Belediyesi Spor	Undisclosed	2 August 2024	
DF	(Ivory Coast) Badra Cisse	(Kosovo) KF Llapi	Contract termination	6 August 2024	
MF	(Bosnia and Herzegovina) Amir Hadžiahmetović	(Turkey) Rizespor	Loan	10 August 2024	
DF	(Spain) Javi Montero	(Spain) Racing Santander	Contract termination	12 August 2024	
FW	(Democratic Republic of the Congo) Jackson Muleka	(Saudi Arabia) Al-Kholood	Loan	22 August 2024	
GK	(Turkey) Utku Yuvakuran	(Turkey) Tuzlaspor	Free	30 August 2024	
DF	(The Gambia) Omar Colley	(Greece) PAOK	Undisclosed	31 August 2024	
MF	(Turkey) Demir Ege Tıknaz	(Portugal) Rio Ave	Loan	2 September 2024	
FW	(Cameroon) Vincent Aboubakar	(Turkey) Hatayspor	Contract termination	9 September 2024	
DF	(Turkey) Aytuğ Batur Kömeç	(Turkey) Isparta 32 Spor	Undisclosed	11 September 2024	
DF	(Ghana) Daniel Amartey		Contract termination	13 September 2024	
FW	(Turkey) Oğuzhan Akgün	(Turkey) Nazilli Belediyespor		13 September 2024	
