= 2025–26 Beşiktaş J.K. season =

Beşiktaş
2025–26 season
- President: Serdal Adalı
- Head coach: Ole Gunnar Solskjær (until 28 August); Sergen Yalçın (from 30 August)
- Stadium: Beşiktaş Park
- Süper Lig: 4th
- Turkish Cup: Semi-finals
- UEFA Europa League: Second qualifying round
- UEFA Conference League: Play-off round
- Top goalscorer: League: Orkun Kökçü (8); All: Tammy Abraham (13)
- Average home league attendance: 30,084
- Biggest win: Kayserispor 0–4 Beşiktaş; Beşiktaş 4–0 Göztepe
- Biggest defeat: Beşiktaş 0–3 Göztepe
Home colours	Away colours	Third colours

The 2025–26 season was the 123rd season in the history of Beşiktaş, and the club's 68th consecutive season in the Süper Lig. In addition to the domestic league, the club participated in the Turkish Cup, having been eliminated in the second qualifying round of the UEFA Europa League by Shakhtar Donetsk and losing out in the play-off round of the UEFA Conference League.

== Season summary ==
On 28 August 2025, manager Ole Gunnar Solskjær was sacked following the sides' defeat at home to Swiss side Lausanne-Sport in the UEFA Conference League play-off round, leaving the club with no European football for the season.

On 30 August 2025, former player and manager Sergen Yalçın was announced as the club's new head coach. While Yalçın stabilized the team against the rest of the league, Beşiktaş struggled with the high-intensity finishing of the top two. In two of those four derbies, Beşiktaş failed to score a single goal, picking up only 1 point out of a possible 12 in league derbies, one of the club's lowest returns in recent memory, ending the 2025–26 Süper Lig season without securing a derby victory for the first time in 41 years, since the 1984–85 season.

In the first half of the Süper Lig season, Beşiktaş earned a 1–1 draw away at Galatasaray on 4 October 2025, but suffered a 3–2 home defeat to Fenerbahçe on 2 November 2025, a match in which Orkun Kökçü was sent off in the 26th minute. The struggles against title rivals continued into the second half of the campaign, as Beşiktaş fell 1–0 at home to Galatasaray on 7 March 2026, followed by a 1–0 away loss to Fenerbahçe on 5 April 2026, decided by a 90th-minute penalty converted by Kerem Aktürkoğlu.

The club's fixtures against rivals Trabzonspor also proved difficult. On 14 December 2025, Beşiktaş played out a 3–3 draw at Papara Park despite being ten men in the first half. In the return fixture on 9 May 2026, Beşiktaş suffered a 2–1 home defeat, with former Beşiktaş player Ernest Muçi scoring the winning goal for the visitors.

Beşiktaş found more consistent success in the Turkish Cup. In the group stage, they secured a notable 2–1 away victory which was their only derby win of the season against Fenerbahçe on 23 December 2025, alongside wins over Ankara Keçiörengücü and Çaykur Rizespor and a draw with Kocaelispor. They advanced to the quarter-finals, where they defeated Alanyaspor 3–0 on 23 April 2026. However, on 5 May 2026, Beşiktaş was eliminated from the Turkish Cup by Konyaspor. Despite the match remaining level for most of the extra time, a late penalty awarded to Konyaspor following a VAR review for a foul in the box decided the result. The loss sent Konyaspor to the final and ended Beşiktaş's tournament campaign.

Following a meeting with Serdal Adalı on 18 May 2026, Yalçın's contract at Beşiktaş was terminated under mutual consent alongside Football A Team General Coordinator Serkan Reçber.

== Players ==
As of 12 September 2025

No.	Name	Nat.	Pos.	Date of birth (Age)	Previous club
Goalkeepers
1	Mert Günok	(Turkey)	GK	1 March 1989 (age 37)	İstanbul Başakşehir
30	Ersin Destanoğlu	(Turkey)	GK	1 January 2001 (age 25)	Academy
33	Emre Bilgin	(Turkey)	GK	25 February 2004 (age 22)	Academy
96	Emir Yaşar	(Turkey)	GK	16 January 2006 (age 20)	Academy
Defenders
2	Jonas Svensson	(Norway)	RB	6 March 1993 (age 33)	Adana Demirspor
3	Gabriel Paulista	(Brazil)	CB	26 November 1990 (age 35)	Atlético Madrid
14	Felix Uduokhai	(Germany)	CB	9 September 1997 (age 29)	FC Augsburg
22	Taylan Bulut	(Germany)	RB	19 January 2006 (age 20)	Schalke
24	Tayyip Talha Sanuç	(Turkey)	CB	17 December 1999 (age 26)	Adana Demirspor
39	David Jurásek	(Czech Republic)	LB	7 August 2000 (age 26)	Benfica
40	Emrecan Uzunhan	(Turkey)	DF	26 February 2001 (age 25)	İstanbulspor
53	Emirhan Topçu	(Turkey)	CB	11 October 2000 (age 26)	Çaykur Rizespor
75	Tayfur Bingöl	(Turkey)	RB	11 January 1993 (age 33)	Alanyaspor
79	Emrecan Terzi	(Turkey)	LB	5 January 2004 (age 22)	Academy
Midfielders
4	Wilfred Ndidi	(Nigeria)	DM	16 December 1996 (age 29)	Leicester City
5	Demir Ege Tıknaz	(Turkey)	MF	17 August 2004 (age 22)	Academy
7	Milot Rashica	(Kosovo)	AM	28 June 1996 (age 30)	Norwich City
8	Salih Uçan	(Turkey)	MF	6 January 1994 (age 32)	Alanyaspor
10	Orkun Kökçü	(Turkey)	MF	29 December 2000 (age 25)	Benfica
17	Kartal Yılmaz	(Turkey)	DM	4 November 2000 (age 25)	Academy
20	Necip Uysal	(Turkey)	MF	24 January 1991 (age 35)	Academy
27	Rafa Silva	(Portugal)	AM	17 May 1993 (age 33)	Benfica
28	Al-Musrati	(Libya)	DM	6 April 1996 (age 30)	Braga
77	Elan Ricardo	(Colombia)	MF	20 February 2004 (age 22)	La Equidad
Forwards
9	Tammy Abraham	(England)	FW	2 October 1997 (age 29)	Roma
91	Mustafa Erhan Hekimoğlu	(Turkey)	FW	22 April 2007 (age 19)	Academy
	Jota Silva	(Portugal)	FW	1 August 1999 (age 27)	Nottingham Forest

== Transfers ==
=== In ===
Date	Pos.	Player	From	Fee	Notes	Ref.
1 July 2025	MF	(Portugal) João Mário	(Portugal) Benfica	€2,000,000	Loan move made permanent	
1 July 2025	DF	(Germany) Felix Uduokhai	(Germany) FC Augsburg	€5,000,000	Loan move made permanent	
8 August 2025	MF	(Nigeria) Wilfred Ndidi	(England) Leicester City	€9,500,000		
16 August 2025	DF	(Germany) Taylan Bulut	(Germany) Schalke	€6,000,000		
23 August 2025	DF	(Turkey) Rıdvan Yılmaz	(Scotland) Rangers	€2,900,000		
2 September 2025	MF	(Czech Republic) Václav Černý	(Germany) VfL Wolfsburg	€6,000,000		
26 January 2026	FW	(England) Tammy Abraham	(Italy) Roma	€13,000,000		
3 February 2026	MF	(Benin) Junior Olaitan	(Turkey) Göztepe	€5,000,000		
4 February 2026	FW	(South Korea) Oh Hyeon-gyu	(Belgium) Genk	€14,000,000		
5 February 2026	DF	(Panama) Michael Amir Murillo	(France) Marseille	€5,000,000		
6 February 2026	DF	(Ivory Coast) Emmanuel Agbadou	(England) Wolverhampton Wanderers	€18,000,000		

=== Loans in ===
Date	Pos.	Player	From	Fee	Notes	Ref.
1 July 2025	DF	(Czech Republic) David Jurásek	(Portugal) Benfica		Includes obligation to buy	
3 July 2025	FW	(England) Tammy Abraham	(Italy) Roma	€2,000,000	With €13,000,000 obligation to buy	
12 July 2025	MF	(Turkey) Orkun Kökçü	(Portugal) Benfica		Includes obligation to buy	
26 August 2025	FW	(Mali) El Bilal Touré	(Italy) Atalanta	€3,000,000	Includes obligation to buy	
8 September 2025	FW	(Turkey) Cengiz Ünder	(Turkey) Fenerbahçe		Includes a €6,000,000 option to buy	
12 September 2025	FW	(Portugal) Jota Silva	(England) Nottingham Forest	€17,000,000	Includes obligation to buy	
28 January 2026	DF	(Turkey) Yasin Özcan	(England) Aston Villa		Includes obligation to buy	
30 January 2026	MF	(Albania) Kristjan Asllani	(Italy) Inter Milan		Includes option to buy	
6 February 2026	GK	(Colombia) Devis Vásquez	(Italy) Roma		Includes option to buy	

=== Out ===
Date	Pos.	Player	To	Fee	Notes	Ref.
20 June 2025	MF	(Turkey) Onur Bulut	(Turkey) İstanbul Başakşehir	€325,000		
10 July 2025	FW	(Italy) Ciro Immobile	(Italy) Bologna	Free transfer		
22 August 2025	DF	(Turkey) Tayfur Bingöl	(Turkey) Kocaelispor	Undisclosed		
27 August 2025	MF	(England) Alex Oxlade-Chamberlain	Unattached	Contract termination	Club paid a severance fee of €1.75 million	
8 January 2026	GK	(Turkey) Mert Günok	(Turkey) Fenerbahçe	Free transfer	Fenerbahçe agreed to give Beşiktaş a discount on Ünder's option to buy	
8 January 2026	DF	(Norway) Jonas Svensson	(Norway) Rosenborg	Free transfer		
11 January 2026	DF	(Brazil) Gabriel Paulista	(Brazil) Corinthians	Free transfer	Contract terminated by mutual consent	
21 January 2026	MF	(Turkey) Demir Ege Tıknaz	(Portugal) Braga	€7,000,000		
22 January 2026	MF	(Portugal) Rafa Silva	(Portugal) Benfica	€5,000,000		
27 January 2026	FW	(England) Tammy Abraham	(England) Aston Villa	€21,000,000		

=== Loans out ===
Date	Pos.	Player	To	Notes	Ref.
3 August 2025	FW	(Turkey) Semih Kılıçsoy	(Italy) Cagliari	Includes option to buy	
7 August 2025	MF	(Turkey) Arda Kılıç	(Serbia) Novi Pazar		
13 August 2025	MF	(Austria) Can Keleş	(Turkey) Kocaelispor		
14 August 2025	MF	(Turkey) Fahri Kerem Ay	(Turkey) İstanbulspor		
29 August 2025	MF	(Libya) Al-Musrati	(Italy) Hellas Verona	Includes option to buy	
1 September 2025	MF	(Cameroon) Jean Onana	(Italy) Genoa	Includes conditional obligation to buy	
6 September 2025	MF	(Albania) Ernest Muçi	(Turkey) Trabzonspor	Includes option to buy	
12 September 2025	MF	(Portugal) João Mário	(Greece) AEK Athens		
12 September 2025	DF	(Turkey) Emrecan Uzunhan	(Turkey) Istanbulspor		

== Competitions ==
=== Overall record ===
Competition	First match	Last match	Starting round	Final position	Record							
Competition	First match	Last match	Starting round	Final position	Pld	W	D	L	GF	GA	GD	Win %
Süper Lig	17 August 2025	15 May 2026	Matchday 1	4th	34	17	9	8	59	40	+19	50.00
Turkish Cup	23 December 2025	5 May 2026	Group stage	Semi-finals	6	4	1	1	13	4	+9	66.67
UEFA Europe League	24 July 2025	31 July 2025	Second qualifying round	Second qualifying round	2	0	0	2	2	6	−4	0.00
UEFA Conference League	7 August 2025	28 August 2025	Third qualifying round	Play-off round	4	2	1	1	8	5	+3	50.00
Total					46	23	11	12	82	55	+27	50.00

Source: FBREF

=== Süper Lig ===
==== League table ====
Pos	Team	Pld	W	D	L	GF	GA	GD	Pts	Qualification or relegation
2	Fenerbahçe	34	21	11	2	77	37	+40	74	Qualification for the Champions League second qualifying round
3	Trabzonspor	34	20	9	5	61	39	+22	69	Qualification for the Europa League play-off round (Note: The 2025–26 Turkish Cup winners qualified for the Europa League play-off round. Since the cup winners (Trabzonspor) qualified based on league position, the Europa League play-off round spot was passed to the third-placed team, the Europa League second round spot was passed to the fourth-placed team, and the Conference League spot was passed to the fifth-placed team.)
4	Beşiktaş	34	17	9	8	59	40	+19	60	Qualification for the Europa League second qualifying round
5	Başakşehir	34	16	9	9	58	35	+23	57	Qualification for the Conference League second qualifying round
6	Göztepe	34	14	13	7	42	32	+10	55	

Source: Süper Lig
Rules for classification: 1) Points; 2) Head-to-head points; 3) Head-to-head goal difference; 4) Head-to-head goals scored; 5) Goal difference; 6) Goals scored; 7) Play-off.
(Note: Head-to-head record is used only after all the matches between the teams in question have been played)

==== Results summary ====
Overall								Home						Away					
Pld	W	D	L	GF	GA	GD	Pts	W	D	L	GF	GA	GD	W	D	L	GF	GA	GD
34	17	9	8	59	40	+19	60	9	4	4	30	20	+10	8	5	4	29	20	+9

Source: TFF.org

Pld = Matches played; W = Matches won; D = Matches drawn; L = Matches lost; GF = Goals for; GA = Goals against; GD = Goal difference; Pts = Points

==== Results by round ====
Round	1	2	3	4	5	6	7	8	9	10	11	12	13	14	15	16	17	18	19	20	21	22	23	24	25	26	27	28	29	30	31	32	33	34
Ground	A	H	A	A	H	A	H	A	H	A	H	A	A	H	A	H	A	A	H	A	H	A	H	A	H	A	H	H	A	H	A	H	A	H
Result	W	W	W	L	W	L	W	D	L	D	L	W	D	W	D	D	W	W	D	W	D	W	W	W	L	W	W	L	W	L	D	W	L	D
Position	1	3	2	3	2	4	3	5	6	4	7	6	7	6	5	5	5	5	5	5	5	5	4	4	4	4	4	4	4	4	4	4	4	4

Updated to match(es) played on 24 February 2026. Source: TFF.org
A = Away; H = Home; W = Win; D = Draw; L = Loss; P = Postponed

==== Matches ====
24 September 2025 1	Kayserispor	0–4	Beşiktaş	Kayseri
20:00 TRT (UTC+3)			R. Silva 15', 32', 58'; Abraham 45+1'	Stadium: Kadir Has Stadium
Note: The match, originally scheduled for 9 August 2025, at 21:00 (UTC+3), was postponed to a later date due to Beşiktaş's participation in European competitions.

17 August 2025 2	Beşiktaş	2–1	Eyüpspor	Istanbul
21:30 TRT (UTC+3)	Abraham 19' (pen.); R. Silva 90+6'	Report	Thiam 29'	Stadium: Beşiktaş Stadium

22 October 2025 3	Konyaspor	0–2	Beşiktaş	Konya
20:00 TRT (UTC+3)		Report	Ndidi 21'; Abraham 72'	Stadium: Konya Metropolitan Municipality Stadium; Referee: Ozan Ergün

31 August 2025 4	Alanyaspor	2–0	Beşiktaş	Alanya
21:30 TRT (UTC+3)	Kaya 45+5' (pen.); Yalçın 76'	Report		Stadium: Alanya Oba Stadium; Referee: Kadir Sağlam

13 September 2025 5	Beşiktaş	2–1	İstanbul Başakşehir	Istanbul
20:00 TRT (UTC+3)	Touré 74'; Ünder 90+1'; Kökçü (red card) 90+8'	Report	Shomurodov 71'; Ba (red card) 89'	Stadium: Beşiktaş Stadium; Referee: Alper Akarsu

19 September 2025 6	Göztepe	3–0	Beşiktaş	İzmir
20:00 TRT (UTC+3)	Juan 4'; Rhaldney 19'; Sabra 84'	Report		Stadium: Gürsel Aksel Stadium; Referee: Mehmet Türkmen

29 September 2025 7	Beşiktaş	3–1	Kocaelispor	Istanbul
20:00 TRT (UTC+3)	R. Silva 4'; Černý 10'; J. Silva 90+3'	Report	Bingöl 50'	Stadium: Beşiktaş Stadium

4 October 2025 8	Galatasaray	1–1	Beşiktaş	Sarıyer
20:00 TRT (UTC+3)	Sánchez (red card) 36'; Osimhen (yellow card) 40'; Gündoğan 55'	Report 1 Report 2 Report 3	Abraham 12'; Topçu (yellow card) 40'; Günok (yellow card) 40'; Sazdağı (yellow card) 59'; Uduokhai (yellow card) 80'; Kökçü (yellow card) 90'; Touré (yellow card) 90'	Stadium: Rams Park; Attendance: 51,641; Referee: Yasin Kol; Assistant referees: Abdullah Bora Özkara, Bahtiyar Birinci; Fourth official: Çağdaş Altay

18 October 2025 9	Beşiktaş	1–2	Gençlerbirliği	Istanbul
17:00 TRT (UTC+3)	Ünder 47'	Report	Jurásek 79' (o.g.); Tongya 81'	Stadium: Beşiktaş Stadium; Referee: Oğuzhan Çakir

26 October 2025 10	Kasımpaşa	1–1	Beşiktaş	Kasımpaşa, Beyoğlu
20:00 TRT (UTC+3)	Winck 33'	Report	Ünder 5'	Stadium: Recep Tayyip Erdoğan Stadium; Referee: Adnan Deniz Kayatepe

2 November 2025 11	Beşiktaş	2–3	Fenerbahçe	Istanbul
20:00 TRT (UTC+3)	Touré 5'; Topçu 22', (yellow card) 90+1'; Kökçü (red card) 26'	Report	Yüksek 32', (yellow card) 90+3'; Semedo (yellow card) 35'; Asensio 45+3'; Álvarez (yellow card) 68'; Aktürkoğlu (yellow card) 78'; Durán 83', (yellow card) 83'	Stadium: Beşiktaş Stadium; Referee: Ali Yılmaz

8 November 2025 12	Antalyaspor	1–3	Beşiktaş	Antalya
20:00 TRT (UTC+3)	Boli 52'	Report	Abraham 2'; Djaló 27'; Jota Silva 81'	Stadium: Antalya Stadium; Attendance: 12,016; Referee: Cihan Aydin

23 November 2025 13	Beşiktaş	1–1	Samsunspor	Istanbul
17:00 TRT (UTC+3)	Ünder 57' (pen.)	Report	Ndiaye 66'	Stadium: Beşiktaş Stadium; Referee: Atilla Karaoglan

30 November 2025 14	Fatih Karagümrük	0–2	Beşiktaş	Istanbul
20:00 TRT (UTC+3)		Report	J. Silva 41'; Touré 71'	Stadium: Atatürk Olympic Stadium; Attendance: 1,807; Referee: Halil Umut Meler

8 December 2025 15	Beşiktaş	2–2	Gaziantep	Istanbul
20:00 TRT (UTC+3)	Touré 35'; Abraham 70'	Report	Bayo 7', 66'	Stadium: Beşiktaş Stadium; Attendance: 20,811; Referee: Kadir Sağlam

14 December 2025 16	Trabzonspor	3–3	Beşiktaş	Trabzon
20:00 TRT (UTC+3)	Muçi 25'; Oulaï 63'; Zubkov 84'	Report	Abraham 18'; Černý 22', 31'; Touré (red card) 38'	Stadium: Şenol Güneş Sports Complex; Referee: Ali Sansalan

20 December 2025 17	Beşiktaş	1–0	Çaykur Rizespor	Istanbul
20:00 TRT (UTC+3)	Rashica 64'	Report		Stadium: Beşiktaş Stadium; Attendance: 21,852; Referee: Cihan Aydın

19 January 2026 18	Beşiktaş	1–0	Kayserispor	Istanbul
20:00 TRT (UTC+3)	Touré 90+5'	Report		Stadium: Beşiktaş Stadium; Referee: Ozan Ergün

26 January 2026 19	Eyüpspor	2–2	Beşiktaş	Istanbul
20:00 TRT (UTC+3)	Bozok 57'; Akbaba 65' (pen.)	Report	Kökçü 6'; Ünder 76'	Stadium: Recep Tayyip Erdoğan Stadium; Referee: Yasin Kol

31 January 2026 20	Beşiktaş	2–1	Konyaspor	Istanbul
20:00 TRT (UTC+3)	Černý 34'; Kökçü 77'; Asllani (red card) 82'	Report	Türüç 23'	Stadium: Beşiktaş Stadium; Referee: Batuhan Kolak

8 February 2026 21	Beşiktaş	2–2	Alanyaspor	Istanbul
20:00 TRT (UTC+3)	Kökçü 32' (pen.); Oh 54'	Report	Yalçın 9', 16'	Stadium: Beşiktaş Stadium

15 February 2025 22	İstanbul Başakşehir	2–3	Beşiktaş	Istanbul
20:00 TRT (UTC+3)	Selke 36'; Yıldırım 88'	Report	Oh 43'; Kökçü 58'; Hekimoğlu 90+6'	Stadium: Başakşehir Fatih Terim Stadium

22 February 2026 23	Beşiktaş	4–0	Göztepe	Istanbul
20:00 TRT (UTC+3)	Ndidi 9'; Murillo 36'; Olaitan 59'; Oh 74'	Report		Stadium: Beşiktaş Stadium

28 February 2026 24	Kocaelispor	0–1	Beşiktaş	Kocaeli
16:00 TRT (UTC+3)		Report	Agbadou 52'	Stadium: Kocaeli Stadium

7 March 2026 25	Beşiktaş	0–1	Galatasaray	Istanbul
20:00 TRT (UTC+3)	Kökçü (yellow card) 29'; Murillo (yellow card) 31'; Olaitan (yellow card) 89'	Report 1 Report 2	Osimhen (yellow card) 6' (goal) 39'; Sané (yellow card) 28' (red card) 62'; Bardakcı (yellow card) 71'; Lemina (yellow card) 77'; Çakır (yellow card) 80'; Sallai (yellow card) 84'; Singo (yellow card) 90'	Stadium: Beşiktaş Stadium; Referee: Ozan Ergün

15 March 2026 26	Gençlerbirliği	0–2	Beşiktaş	Ankara
20:00 TRT (UTC+3)		Report	Olaitan 56'; Kökçü 67'	Stadium: Eryaman Stadium

19 March 2026 27	Beşiktaş	2–1	Kasımpaşa	Istanbul
20:00 TRT (UTC+3)	Oh 11'; Kökçü 45+2'	Report	Benedyczak 57' (pen.)	Stadium: Beşiktaş Stadium

5 April 2026 28	Fenerbahçe	1–0	Beşiktaş	Istanbul
20:00 TRT (UTC+3)	Nene (yellow card) 68'; Oosterwolde (yellow card) 81'; Aktürkoğlu 90+11' (pen.); Ederson (yellow card) 90+14'	Report	Destanoğlu (yellow card) 45+5'; Ndidi (yellow card) 52'; Yılmaz (yellow card) 78'; Agbadou (yellow card) 90+7'; Ünder (yellow card) 90+8'	Stadium: Şükrü Saracoğlu Stadium

10 April 2026 29	Beşiktaş	4–2	Antalya	Istanbul
20:00 TRT (UTC+3)	Kökçü 4'; Silva 9'; Oh 33' 59'	Report	van de Streek 21'; Ballet 47'	Stadium: Beşiktaş Stadium

19 April 2026 30	Samsunspor	2–1	Beşitaş	Samsun
17:00 TRT (UTC+3)	Holse 50'; Coulibaly 56'	Report	Asllani 90+1' (pen.)	Stadium: Samsun 19 Mayıs Stadium

27 April 2026 31	Beşiktaş	0–0	Fatih Karagümrük	Istanbul
20:00 TRT (UTC+3)		Report		Stadium: Beşiktaş Stadium

1 May 2026 32	Gaziantep	0–2	Beşitaş	Gaziantep
20:00 TRT (UTC+3)		Report	Djaló 7'; Asllani 22' (pen.)	Stadium: Gaziantep Stadium

9 May 2026 33	Beşiktaş	1–2	Trabzonspor	Istanbul
20:00 TRT (UTC+3)	Kökçü 14' (pen.)	Report	Zubkov 15'; Muçi 62'	Stadium: Beşiktaş Stadium

15 May 2026 34	Çaykur Rizespor	2–2	Beşitaş	Rize
20:00 TRT (UTC+3)	Sowe 18' 31'	Report	Silva 55'; Černý 62'	Stadium: Rize City Stadium

=== Turkish Cup ===
==== Group stage ====
Pos	Team	Pld	W	D	L	GF	GA	GD	Pts	Qualification
1	Beşiktaş	4	3	1	0	10	3	+7	10	Quarter-finals
2	Fenerbahçe	4	3	0	1	9	3	+6	9	Quarter-finals
3	Erzurumspor	4	2	0	2	8	8	0	6	
4	Gaziantep	4	2	0	2	8	10	−2	6	
5	Kocaelispor	4	1	1	2	4	4	0	4	
6	Rizespor	4	1	1	2	7	9	−2	4	
7	Beyoğlu Yeni Çarşı	4	1	1	2	3	5	−2	4	
8	Keçiörengücü	4	1	0	3	6	13	−7	3	

Source: TFF.org

23 December 2025 1	Fenerbahçe	1–2	Beşiktaş	Istanbul
20:30 TRT (UTC+3)	Aydın (yellow card) 36'; Asensio 43' (pen.); Elmaz (yellow card) 61'	Report	Černý 33', 90+1'; Şahin (yellow card) 39'; Abraham (yellow card) 42'	Stadium: Şükrü Saracoğlu Stadium; Referee: Oğuzhan Çakır

15 January 2026 2	Beşiktaş	3–0	Keçiörengücü	Istanbul
20:30	Abraham 15'; Toure 55'; Yılmaz 87'	Report		Stadium: Beşiktaş Stadium; Referee: bdullah Taskinsoy

5 February 2026 3	Kocaelispor	1–1	Beşiktaş	Kocaeli
18:00	Dursun 18' (pen.)		Kökçü 88' (pen.)	Stadium: Kocaeli

4 March 2026 4	Beşiktaş	4–1	Rizespor	Istanbul
	Murillo 27'; Uçan 38'; Oh 42'; Yılmaz 81'	Report	Papanikolaou 85'	Stadium: Beşiktaş Stadium

==== Quarter-finals ====
23 April 2026 Quarter-finals	Beşiktaş	3–0	Alanyaspor	Istanbul
	Toure 17'; Oh 83'; Kökçü 85'			Stadium: Beşiktaş Stadium

==== Semi-finals ====
5 May 2026 Semi-finals	Beşiktaş	0–1	Konyaspor	Istanbul
20:30			Bardhi 90+8' (pen.)	Stadium: Beşiktaş Stadium

=== UEFA Europa League ===
==== Second qualifying round ====
24 July 2025 First leg	Beşiktaş (Turkey)	2–4	(Ukraine) Shakhtar Donetsk	Beşiktaş Stadium, Istanbul
20:00 (21:00 UTC+3)	Abraham 40' (pen.); João Mário 87'	Report	Alisson 7'; Eguinaldo 28'; Kevin 67', 90+6'	Attendance: 31,739; Referee: Georgi Kabakov (Bulgaria)

31 July 2025 Second leg	Shakhtar Donetsk (Ukraine)	2–0 (6–2 agg.)	(Turkey) Beşiktaş	Henryk Reyman Municipal Stadium, Kraków, Poland (Note: Due to the Russian invasion of Ukraine, Ukrainian teams were required to play their home matches at neutral venues until further notice.)
20:00	Kevin 12'; Kauã Elias 45+2'	Report		Attendance: 12,828; Referee: Juan Martínez Munuera (Spain)

=== UEFA Conference League ===
==== Third qualifying round ====
7 August 2025 First leg	St Patrick's Athletic (Republic of Ireland)	1–4	(Turkey) Beşiktaş	Tallaght Stadium, Dublin (Note: St Patrick's Athletic played their third round home match at Tallaght Stadium, instead of their regular stadium, Richmond Park, which did not meet UEFA requirements for that round.)
20:45 (19:45 UTC+1)	Power 49'	Report	João Mário 8'; Abraham 14', 23', 43' (pen.)	Attendance: 7,821; Referee: David Šmajc (Slovenia)

14 August 2025 Second leg	Beşiktaş (Turkey)	3–2 (7–3 agg.)	(Republic of Ireland) St Patrick's Athletic	Beşiktaş Stadium, Istanbul
20:00 (21:00 UTC+3)	Tıknaz 43'; Abraham 49'; João Mário 79'	Report	Carty 3' (pen.); McLaughlin 34'	Attendance: 20,456; Referee: António Nobre (Portugal)

==== Play-off round ====
21 August 2025 First leg	Lausanne-Sport (Switzerland)	1–1	(Turkey) Beşiktaş	Stade de la Tuilière, Lausanne
20:15	Okoh 83'	Report	Rashica 45'	Attendance: 11,931; Referee: Sigurd Kringstad (Norway)

28 August 2025 Second leg	Beşiktaş (Turkey)	0–1 (1–2 agg.)	(Switzerland) Lausanne-Sport	Beşiktaş Stadium, Istanbul
19:00 (20:00 UTC+3)	Uduokhai (red card) 46'	Report	Butler-Oyedeji 45+1'	Attendance: 27,031; Referee: Jakob Kehlet (Denmark)

== Statistics ==
=== Goal scorers ===
As of match played 17 May 2026

Rank	No.	Pos.	Player	Süper Lig	Turkish Cup	Europa League	Conference League	Total
1	9	FW	(England) Tammy Abraham	7	1	1	4	13
2	11	MF	(Turkey) Orkun Kökçü	8	2	0	0	10
3	9	FW	(South Korea) Oh Hyeon-gyu	6	2	0	0	8
4	18	MF	(Czech Republic) Václav Černý	5	2	0	0	7
4	19	FW	(Mali) El Bilal Touré	5	2	0	0	7
5	11	FW	(Turkey) Cengiz Ünder	5	0	0	0	5
5	27	MF	(Portugal) Rafa Silva	5	0	0	0	5
6	26	FW	(Portugal) Jota Silva	4	0	0	0	4
7	18	MF	(Portugal) João Mário	0	0	1	2	3
8	4	MF	(Albania) Kristjan Asllani	2	0	0	0	2
8	23	MF	(Nigeria) Wilfred Ndidi	2	0	0	0	2
8	35	DF	(Portugal) Tiago Djaló	2	0	0	0	2
8	7	MF	(Kosovo) Milot Rashica	1	0	0	1	2
8	15	MF	(Benin) Junior Olaitan	2	0	0	0	2
8	17	MF	(Turkey) Kartal Yılmaz	0	2	0	0	2
8	62	DF	(Panama) Michael Amir Murillo	1	1	0	0	2
9	5	MF	(Turkey) Demir Ege Tıknaz	0	0	0	1	1
9	8	MF	(Turkey) Salih Uçan	0	1	0	0	1
9	12	DF	(Ivory Coast) Emmanuel Agbadou	1	0	0	0	1
9	53	DF	(Turkey) Emirhan Topçu	1	0	0	0	1
9	91	FW	(Turkey) Mustafa Erhan Hekimoğlu	1	0	0	0	1
9	Own goals			1	0	0	0	1
Totals				58	14	2	8	82

=== Clean sheets ===
As of match played 17 May 2026

Rank	No.	Pos.	Player	Süper Lig	Turkish Cup	Europa League	Conference League	Total
1	30	GK	(Turkey) Ersin Destanoğlu	25	6	0	1	32
2	1	GK	(Turkey) Mert Günok	8	0	2	3	13
3	32	GK	(Colombia) Devis Vásquez	1	0	0	0	1
Totals				34	6	2	4	46
