= Junior Olaitan =

Beninese footballer (born 2002)

Personal information
- Full name: Junior Olaitan Ishola
- Date of birth: 9 May 2002 (age 24)
- Place of birth: Porto-Novo, Benin
- Height: 1.74 m (5 ft 9 in)
- Position: Attacking midfielder

Team information
- Current team: Beşiktaş
- Number: 15

Senior career*
Years	Team	Apps	(Gls)
2019–2022	Ayema		
2022–2024	Niort	42	(4)
2022–2024	Niort B	4	(2)
2023–2024	→ Troyes (loan)	20	(0)
2024	→ Troyes B (loan)	1	(0)
2024	Troyes	0	(0)
2024–2025	Grenoble	24	(4)
2025–2026	Göztepe	17	(2)
2026–	Beşiktaş	25	(3)

International career^{‡}
2021–	Benin	46	(5)
- * Club domestic league appearances and goals as of 22 November 2026 ‡ National team caps and goals as of 16 November 2026

Junior Olaitan Ishola (born 9 May 2002) is a Beninese professional footballer who plays as an attacking midfielder for Turkish Süper Lig club Beşiktaş and the Benin national team.

== Club career ==
Olaitan began his senior career with the Beninese club Ayéma Adjarra, where he scored 10 goals in 28 matches during the 2020–21 season. Olaitan transferred to the French club Niort on 31 January 2022, signing a three-year contract. He made his professional debut with Niort in a 2–0 Ligue 2 win over Quevilly-Rouen, coming on as a late sub in the 84th minute. He joined Troyes in the 2023 transfer market with a release clause amounting to €1.7 million and his contract is valid until 2025.

On 30 August 2024, Olaitan signed for Ligue 2 club Grenoble on a three-year contract.

On 26 July 2025, Olaitan signed a four-year contract with Göztepe in Turkey.

On 3 February 2026, Olaitan joined Beşiktaş on a permanent three-year deal with an option for another year.

== International career ==
Olaitan was born in Benin to a Nigerian father and Beninese mother, and raised in Nigeria. He debuted with the Benin national team in a 1–0 2022 FIFA World Cup qualification win over Madagascar on 2 September 2021.

== Career statistics ==
=== Club ===
As of match played 20 August 2026

Appearances and goals by club, season and competition
Club	Season	League			National cup (Note: Includes Coupe de France, Turkish Cup)		Continental		Other		Total	
Club	Season	Division	Apps	Goals	Apps	Goals	Apps	Goals	Apps	Goals	Apps	Goals
Niort	2021–22	Ligue 2	6	0	0	0	–		–		6	0
Niort	2022–23	Ligue 2	33	3	4	2	–		–		37	5
Niort	2023–24	Championnat National	3	1	0	0	–		–		3	1
Niort	Total		42	4	4	2	–		–		46	6
Niort B	2021–22	Championnat National 3	2	1	0	0	–		–		2	1
Niort B	2022–23	Championnat National 3	2	1	0	0	–		–		2	1
Niort B	Total		4	2	0	0	–		–		4	2
Troyes (loan)	2023–24	Ligue 2	20	0	0	0	–		–		20	0
Troyes B (loan)	2023–24	Championnat National 3	1	0	0	0	–		–		1	0
Grenoble	2024–25	Ligue 2	24	4	1	0	–		–		25	4
Göztepe	2025–26	Süper Lig	17	2	1	0	–		–		18	2
Beşiktaş	2025–26	Süper Lig	14	2	4	0	–		–		18	2
Beşiktaş	2026–27	Süper Lig	5	0	0	0	7 (Note: Appearances in UEFA Europa League)	0	–		12	0
Beşiktaş	Total		19	2	4	0	7	0	–		30	2
Career total			133	14	10	4	7	0	0	0	150	18

=== International ===
As of match played 16 November 2026

Appearances and goals by national team and year
National team	Year	Apps	Goals
Benin	2021	5	0
Benin	2022	7	1
Benin	2023	7	0
Benin	2024	10	3
Benin	2025	9	1
Benin	2026	8	0
Total		46	5

Scores and results list Benin's goal tally first.

No.	Date	Venue	Opponent	Score	Result	Competition
1.	4 June 2022	Diamniadio Olympic Stadium, Diamniadio, Senegal	Senegal	1–3	1–3	2023 Africa Cup of Nations qualification
2.	23 March 2024	Stade de la Licorne, Amiens, France	Ivory Coast	1–0	2–2	Friendly
3.	23 March 2024	Stade de la Licorne, Amiens, France	Ivory Coast	1–2	2–2	Friendly
4.	10 September 2024	Stade Félix Houphouët-Boigny, Abidjan, Ivory Coast	Libya	2–1	2–1	2025 Africa Cup of Nations qualification
5.	9 September 2025	Stade Félix Houphouët-Boigny, Abidjan, Ivory Coast	Lesotho	4–0	4–0	2026 FIFA World Cup qualification
