= Emirhan Topçu =

Turkish footballer

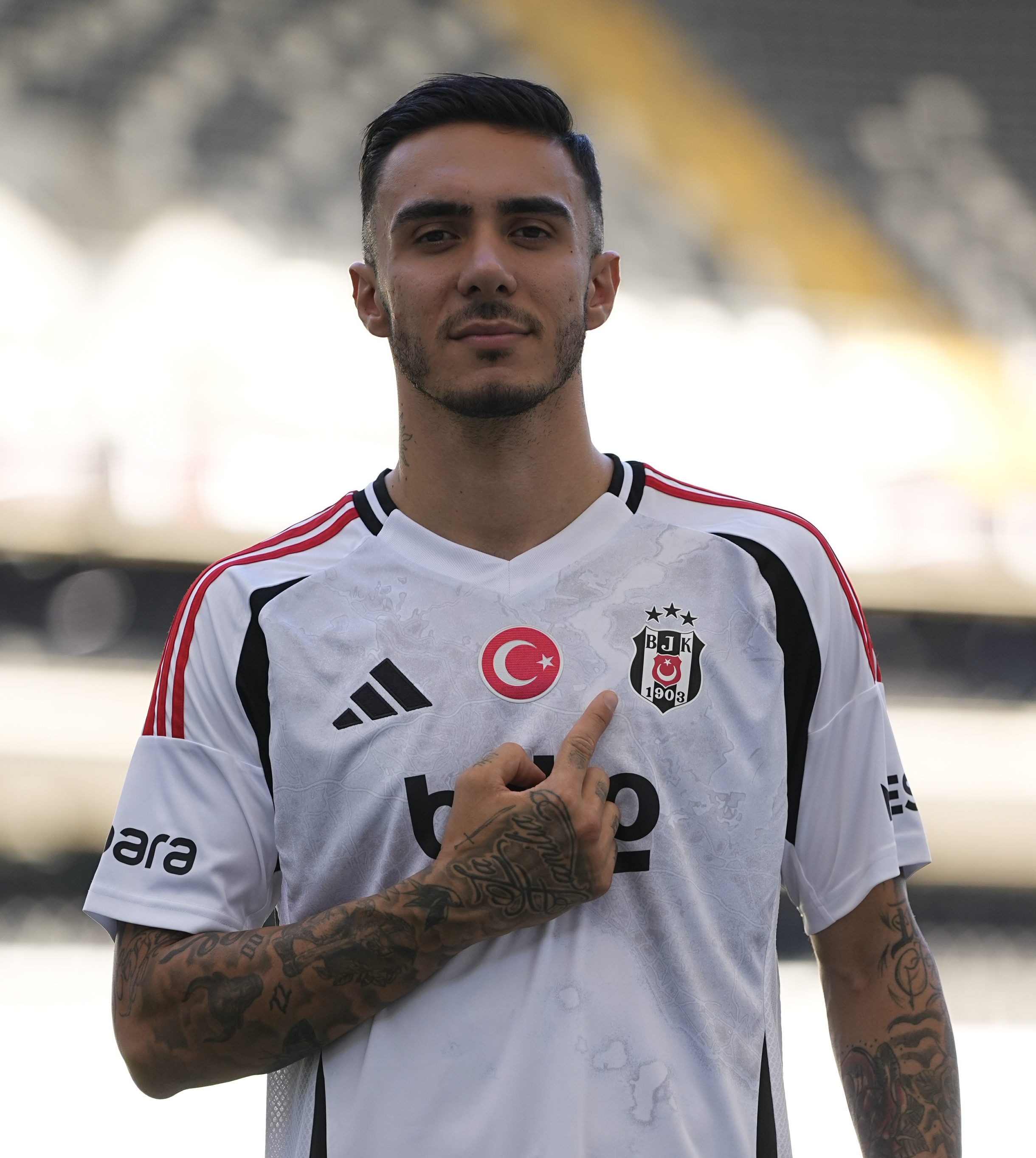
- Topçu with Beşiktaş in 2024

Personal information
- Full name: Emirhan Topçu
- Date of birth: 11 October 2000 (age 26)
- Place of birth: Bandırma, Turkey
- Height: 1.88 m (6 ft 2 in)
- Position: Centre back

Team information
- Current team: Beşiktaş
- Number: 53

Youth career
- 2012–2018: Çaykur Rizespor

Senior career*
Years	Team	Apps	(Gls)
2018–2024	Çaykur Rizespor	78	(2)
2020	→ Čelik Zenica (loan)	1	(0)
2021	→ Menemenspor (loan)	15	(0)
2024–	Beşiktaş	58	(3)

International career^{‡}
2024–	Turkey	3	(0)
- * Club domestic league appearances and goals as of 8 November 2026 ‡ National team caps and goals as of 15 November 2026

Emirhan Topçu (born 11 October 2000) is a Turkish professional footballer who plays as a centre back for Turkish Süper Lig club Beşiktaş and the Turkey national team.

== Professional career ==
Topçu is a youth product of Çaykur Rizespor, and joined Čelik Zenica on loan 13 February 2020. He made his debut with Čelik Zenica in a 2-1 Premier League of Bosnia and Herzegovina loss to FK Sloboda Tuzla on 7 March 2020.

On 2 August 2024, Topcu signed a four-year deal with fellow Süper Lig club Beşiktaş

== International career ==
Topçu was first called up to the Turkey U21s in May 2022 for a set of 2023 UEFA European Under-21 Championship qualification matches.

Topçu made his debut for the Turkey national team on 6 September 2024 in a Nations League game against Wales at the Cardiff City Stadium. He substituted Zeki Çelik in the 90th minute of a scoreless draw.

== Career statistics ==
=== Club ===
As of match played 19 September 2026

Appearances and goals by club, season and competition
Club	Season	League			Turkish Cup		Europe		Total	
Club	Season	Division	Apps	Goals	Apps	Goals	Apps	Goals	Apps	Goals
Çaykur Rizespor	2017–18	1. Lig	2	0	0	0	—		2	0
Çaykur Rizespor	2018–19	1. Lig	0	0	2	0	—		2	0
Çaykur Rizespor	2019–20	1. Lig	0	0	3	0	—		3	0
Çaykur Rizespor	2020–21	1. Lig	0	0	3	0	—		3	0
Çaykur Rizespor	2021–22	Süper Lig	13	0	1	0	—		14	0
Çaykur Rizespor	2022–23	1. Lig	31	1	1	0	—		32	1
Çaykur Rizespor	2023–24	Süper Lig	32	1	0	0	—		32	1
Çaykur Rizespor	Total		78	2	10	0	—		88	2
Menemenspor (loan)	2020–21	1. Lig	15	0	—		—		15	0
Beşiktaş	2024–25	Süper Lig	28	1	3	0	8 (Note: Appearances in UEFA Europa League)	0	39	1
Beşiktaş	2025–26	Süper Lig	21	1	3	0	5 (Note: One appearance in UEFA Europa League, four appearances in UEFA Conference League)	0	29	1
Beşiktaş	2026–27	Süper Lig	3	1	0	0	7	0	10	1
Beşiktaş	Total		52	3	6	0	20	0	78	3
Career total			145	5	16	0	20	0	181	5

=== International ===
As of 15 November 2026

Appearances and goals by national team and year
National team	Year	Apps	Goals
Turkey
Turkey	2024	2	0
Turkey	2026	1	0
Total		3	0
