= Orkun Kökçü =

Turkey international footballer (born 2000)

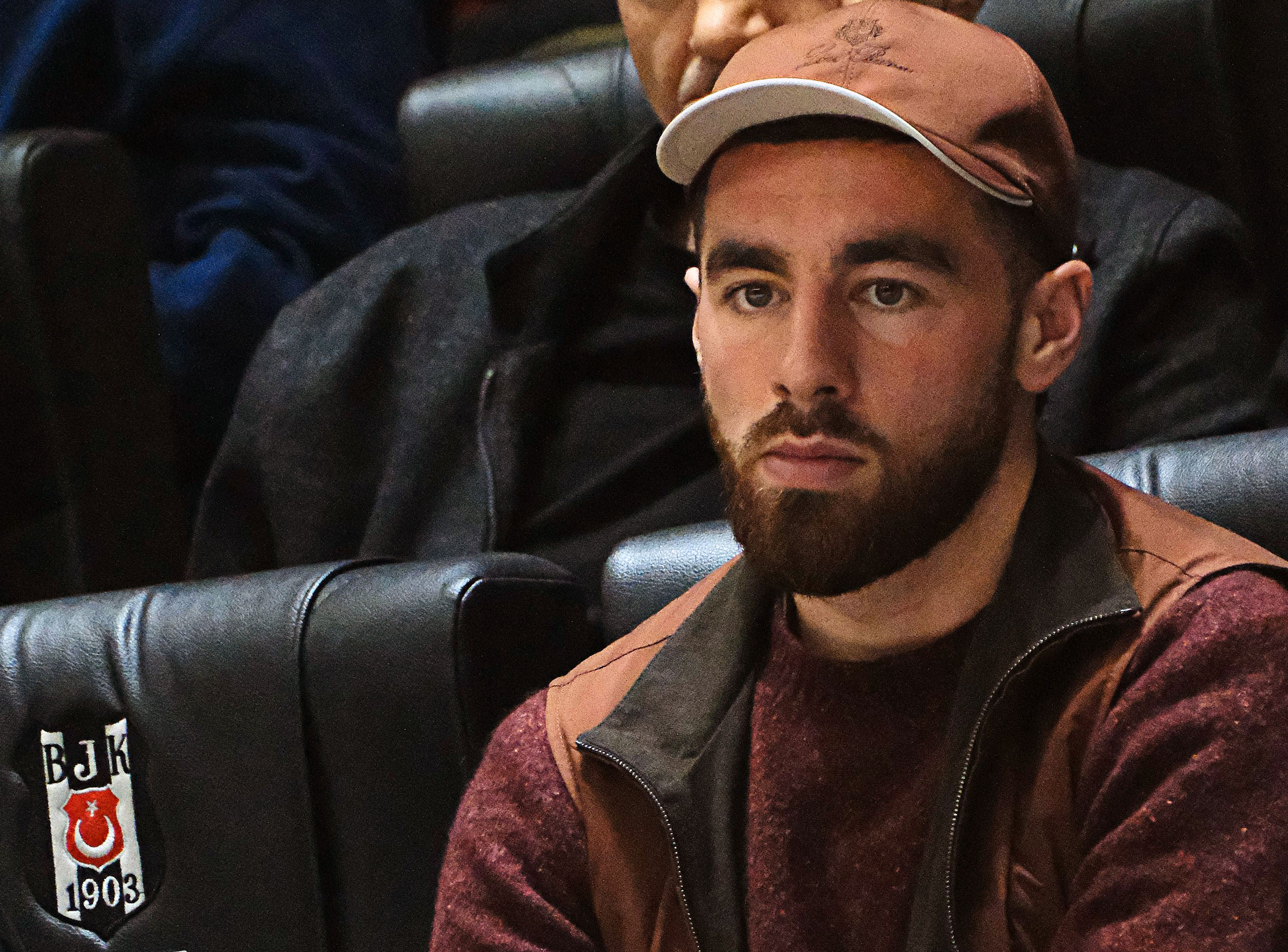
- Kökçü in 2026

Personal information
- Full name: Orkun Kökçü
- Date of birth: 29 December 2000 (age 25)
- Place of birth: Haarlem, Netherlands
- Height: 1.75 m (5 ft 9 in)
- Position: Midfielder

Team information
- Current team: Beşiktaş
- Number: 10

Youth career
- 2007–2009: Olympia Haarlem
- 2009–2010: EDO
- 2010–2011: Stormvogels
- 2011–2014: Groningen
- 2014–2018: Feyenoord

Senior career*
| Years | Team | Apps | (Gls) |
| 2018–2023 | Feyenoord | 119 | (23) |
| 2023–2026 | Benfica | 60 | (14) |
| 2025–2026 | → Beşiktaş (loan) | 30 | (8) |
| 2026– | Beşiktaş | 8 | (2) |

International career^{‡}
| 2017–2018 | Netherlands U18 | 5 | (2) |
| 2018–2019 | Netherlands U19 | 7 | (2) |
| 2019 | Turkey U21 | 2 | (0) |
| 2020– | Turkey | 56 | (4) |
- * Club domestic league appearances and goals as of 23:09, 8 November 2026 (UTC) ‡ National team caps and goals as of 22:55, 15 November 2026 (UTC)

Orkun Kökçü (Turkish pronunciation: [oɾˈkun ˈcœctʃy]; born 29 December 2000) is a professional footballer who plays as a midfielder for Süper Lig club Beşiktaş, whom he captains. Born in the Netherlands, he plays for the Turkey national team.

== Club career ==
=== Feyenoord ===
A youth product of FC Groningen, where he arrived after having played for local clubs around his hometown Haarlem, Kökçü joined the Feyenoord youth academy in 2014. He made his debut for Feyenoord at the age of 17 in a 4–0 win over VV Gemert in the first round of the KNVB Cup on 17 September 2018, scoring Feyenoord's second goal. He made his Eredivisie debut against FC Emmen on 9 December 2018, and contributed with a goal and an assist after coming on as a substitute.

On 10 April 2019, he extended his contract at Feyenoord until 2023. On 26 June 2020, he reached an agreement to extend his contract with Feyenoord for another two years, a deal to the end of the 2024–25 season.

Following Jens Toornstra's departure, Feyenoord head coach Arne Slot chose Kökçü as his club captain on 2 September 2022. With Kökçü as captain, Feyenoord went on to win the 2022–23 Eredivisie.

=== Benfica ===
On 10 June 2023, Kökçü joined Benfica on a five-year deal for a reported fee of €25 million, plus €5 million in variables. The sum represented a record signing for the Portuguese club and the league surpassing Darwin Núñez transfer from Almería to Benfica in 2020 for transfer fee of €24 million and a club record sale for Feyenoord becoming the club's biggest sale since Kökçu's former Feyenoord teammate Luis Sinisterra's transfer to Leeds United in 2022 for a fee of €25 million.

Kökçü made his debut for Benfica in the Supertaça Cândido de Oliveira, starting in a 2–0 win over rivals FC Porto. He scored his first goal on 2 September, netting Benfica's third goal in a 4–0 home win over Vitória de Guimarães. Kökçü made his UEFA Champions League debut on 20 September, starting in a 2–0 home loss to Red Bull Salzburg.

=== Beşiktaş ===
On 12 July 2025, Kökçü agreed on a loan deal with Süper Lig club Beşiktaş with an obligation to buy. On 17 October 2025, Kökçü was appointed as the new captain of the team.

== International career ==
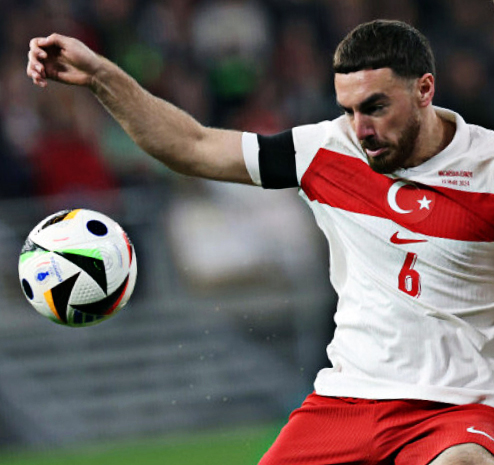
Kökçü playing for Turkey in 2024

Kökçü was a youth international for the Netherlands, having represented the Netherlands U18s, and Netherlands U19s. In July 2019, Kökçü announced the intent to play for the Turkey national team. He represented the Turkey U21s in a 3–2 2021 UEFA European Under-21 Championship qualification loss to the England U21s on 6 September 2019.

He made his Turkey national team debut on 6 September 2020 in a Nations League game against Serbia, he started the game and played the first hour of the 0–0 away draw. In June 2021, Kökçü was included in the list of 26 Turkish players selected to compete at UEFA Euro 2020. On 7 June 2024, he was named in the final squad of 26 players chosen by Vincenzo Montella to take part in UEFA Euro 2024. On 2 June 2026, Kökçü was selected in the 26-man squad for the 2026 FIFA World Cup.

== Personal life ==
Born in the Netherlands, Kökçü is of Turkish descent, from Suvermez, Emirdağ. He is the younger brother of the professional footballer Ozan Kökçü who plays internationally for the Azerbaijan national team. He is a lifelong fan of Beşiktaş and indicated a desire to play for the club he had been supporting since childhood.

== Career statistics ==
=== Club ===
As of match played 8 November 2026

Appearances and goals by club, season and competition
| Club | Season | League | | | National cup (Note: Includes KNVB Cup, Taça de Portugal, Turkish Cup) | | League cup (Note: Includes Taça da Liga) | | Europe | | Other | | Total | |
| Club | Season | Division | Apps | Goals | Apps | Goals | Apps | Goals | Apps | Goals | Apps | Goals | Apps | Goals |
|---|---|---|---|---|---|---|---|---|---|---|---|---|---|---|
| Feyenoord | 2018–19 | Eredivisie | 11 | 3 | 1 | 1 | — | | 0 | 0 | — | | 12 | 4 |
| Feyenoord | 2019–20 (Note: Season curtailed due to COVID-19 pandemic in the Netherlands) | Eredivisie | 22 | 2 | 4 | 0 | — | | 9 (Note: Appearances in UEFA Europa League) | 1 | — | | 35 | 3 |
| Feyenoord | 2020–21 | Eredivisie | 22 | 3 | 1 | 0 | — | | 6 | 1 | 2 (Note: Appearances in Eredivisie European competition play-offs) | 0 | 31 | 4 |
| Feyenoord | 2021–22 | Eredivisie | 32 | 7 | 1 | 0 | — | | 18 (Note: Appearances in UEFA Europa Conference League) | 2 | — | | 51 | 9 |
| Feyenoord | 2022–23 | Eredivisie | 32 | 8 | 4 | 1 | — | | 10 | 3 | — | | 46 | 12 |
| Feyenoord | Total | | 119 | 23 | 11 | 2 | — | | 43 | 7 | 2 | 0 | 175 | 32 |
| Benfica | 2023–24 | Primeira Liga | 27 | 7 | 4 | 0 | 2 | 0 | 9 (Note: Five appearances in UEFA Champions League, four appearances in UEFA Europa League) | 0 | 1 (Note: Appearance in Supertaça Cândido de Oliveira) | 0 | 43 | 7 |
| Benfica | 2024–25 | Primeira Liga | 33 | 7 | 3 | 1 | 3 | 0 | 12 (Note: Appearances in UEFA Champions League) | 4 | 4 (Note: Appearances in FIFA Club World Cup) | 0 | 55 | 12 |
| Benfica | Total | | 60 | 14 | 7 | 1 | 5 | 0 | 21 | 4 | 5 | 0 | 98 | 19 |
| Beşiktaş (loan) | 2025–26 | Süper Lig | 30 | 8 | 6 | 2 | — | | 5 (Note: One appearance in UEFA Europa League, four appearances in UEFA Conference League) | 0 | — | | 41 | 10 |
| Beşiktaş | 2026–27 | Süper Lig | 8 | 2 | 0 | 0 | — | | 8 | 4 | — | | 16 | 6 |
| Beşiktaş | Beşiktaş total | | 38 | 10 | 6 | 2 | — | | 13 | 4 | — | | 57 | 16 |
| Career total | | | 217 | 47 | 24 | 5 | 5 | 0 | 77 | 15 | 7 | 0 | 330 | 67 |

=== International ===
As of match played 15 November 2026

Appearances and goals by national team and year
| National team | Year | Apps | Goals |
|---|---|---|---|
| Turkey | 2020 | 2 | 0 |
| Turkey | 2021 | 11 | 1 |
| Turkey | 2022 | 5 | 0 |
| Turkey | 2023 | 6 | 1 |
| Turkey | 2024 | 14 | 0 |
| Turkey | 2025 | 8 | 1 |
| Turkey | 2026 | 10 | 1 |
| Total | | 56 | 4 |

Scores and results list Turkey's goal tally first.

International goals by date, venue, cap, opponent, score, result and competition
| No. | Date | Venue | Cap | Opponent | Score | Result | Competition |
|---|---|---|---|---|---|---|---|
| 1 | 16 November 2021 | Podgorica City Stadium, Podgorica, Montenegro | 13 | Montenegro | 2–1 | 2–1 | 2022 FIFA World Cup qualification |
| 2 | 25 March 2023 | Vazgen Sargsyan Republican Stadium, Yerevan, Armenia | 19 | Armenia | 1–1 | 2–1 | UEFA Euro 2024 qualifying |
| 3 | 20 March 2025 | Rams Park, Istanbul, Turkey | 39 | Hungary | 1–0 | 3–1 | 2024–25 UEFA Nations League promotion/relegation play-offs |
| 4 | 1 June 2026 | Şükrü Saracoğlu Stadium, Istanbul, Turkey | 49 | North Macedonia | 1–0 | 4–0 | Friendly |

== Honours ==
Feyenoord

- Eredivisie: 2022–23
- Johan Cruyff Shield: 2018
- UEFA Europa Conference League runner-up: 2022

Benfica

- Taça da Liga: 2024–25
- Supertaça Cândido de Oliveira: 2023

Individual

- Eredivisie Talent of the Month: December 2019, March 2021
- Eredivisie Player of the Month: January 2022, February 2022
- Eredivisie Team of the Month: August 2021, December 2021, January 2022, February 2022, April 2022, September 2022, October 2022, November 2022, March 2023, April 2023
- Eredivisie Player of the Year: 2022–23
- Eredivisie Team of the Season: 2022–23
- Primeira Liga Goal of the Month: September 2023
- Primeira Liga Midfielder of the Month: March 2025
- Süper Lig Team of the Season: 2025–26
