= Rafa Silva =

Portuguese footballer (born 1993)

Rafa Silva ComM
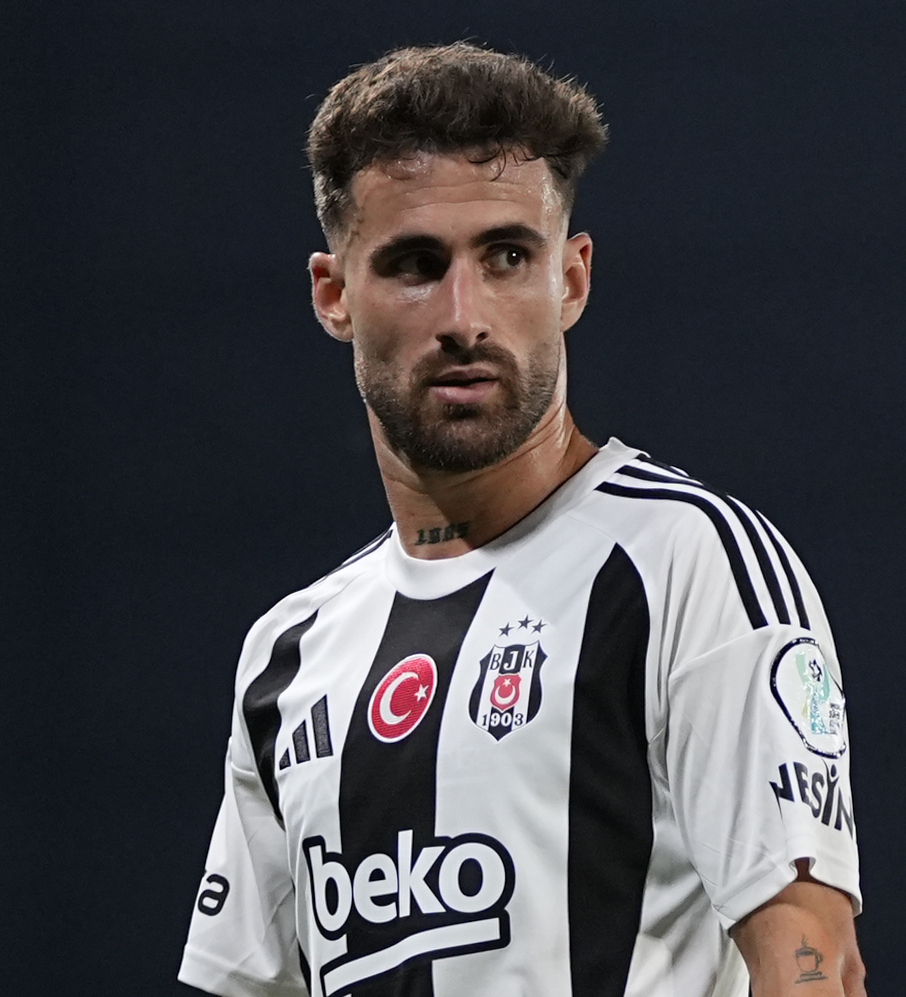
- Silva with Beşiktaş in 2024

Personal information
- Full name: Rafael Alexandre Fernandes Ferreira da Silva
- Date of birth: 17 May 1993 (age 33)
- Place of birth: Vila Franca de Xira, Portugal
- Height: 1.70 m (5 ft 7 in)
- Positions: Attacking midfielder; winger; second striker

Team information
- Current team: Benfica
- Number: 27

Youth career
- 2002–2003: Povoense
- 2003–2011: Alverca
- 2011–2012: Feirense

Senior career*
Years	Team	Apps	(Gls)
2012–2013	Feirense	41	(10)
2013–2016	Braga	88	(13)
2016–2024	Benfica	206	(64)
2024–2026	Beşiktaş	45	(17)
2026–	Benfica	27	(6)

International career
2013	Portugal U20	2	(0)
2013–2015	Portugal U21	13	(3)
2014–2021	Portugal	25	(0)
Medal record
Men's football
Representing Portugal
UEFA European Championship
Winner	2016 France
UEFA Nations League
Winner	2019 Portugal
UEFA European Under-21 Championship
Runner-up	2015 Czech Republic
- * Club domestic league appearances and goals as of 20:28, 8 November 2026 (UTC)

Rafael Alexandre Fernandes Ferreira da Silva (Portuguese pronunciation: [ˈʁafɐ ˈsilvɐ]; born 17 May 1993), known as Rafa Silva or simply Rafa, is a Portuguese footballer who plays as a winger or second striker for Primeira Liga club Benfica.

After starting his professional career at Feirense, Silva transferred to Braga in 2013 and went on to make 127 appearances for them, scoring 26 goals winning the Taça de Portugal in 2016. He joined Benfica that year for €16.4 million. During an eight year spell, he played 326 games and scored 94 goals, winning three league championships and another cup. In June 2024, he joined Beşiktaş in Turkey, before returning to Benfica in 2026.

A full international from 2014 to 2021, Silva represented Portugal on 25 occasions. He was selected for the 2014 World Cup, Euro 2016, the 2019 Nations League Finals and Euro 2020, winning the 2016 and 2019 tournaments.

== Club career ==
=== Feirense ===
Born in Vila Franca de Xira, Silva grew up in Forte da Casa and started playing football with Povoense and Alverca, both in the Lisbon District. In 2011, aged 18, he signed with Feirense with which he played his last year as a junior.

Silva made his professional debut on 29 July 2012, playing the full 90 minutes in a 2–1 home win against Penafiel for the season's Taça da Liga. He only missed one game in the league campaign, totalling more than 3,200 minutes of action to help his team finish 13th in the Segunda Liga.

=== Braga ===
In June 2013, Silva signed a five-year contract with Braga for an undisclosed fee. On 10 November he scored his first goals, striking twice in a 3–1 win at Olhanense in the fourth round of the Taça de Portugal; nineteen days later he scored for the first time in the league, in a 4–1 home win over the same opposition. He finished his first year with 23 appearances and three goals to help to a ninth-place finish.

The following season, Silva was ever-present in the league, starting all but one game. He scored three times in the 2014–15 Taça de Portugal, including one in the final which they lost in a penalty shootout to Sporting CP at the Estádio Nacional on 31 May 2015.

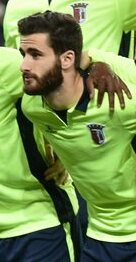
Silva with S.C. Braga in 2016

Silva scored the only goal on his UEFA Europa League debut on 17 September 2015 to defeat Slovan Liberec away, and added two further goals in a run to the quarter-finals. After a 2015–16 season in which Braga won the cup final against FC Porto, he was coveted by Benfica.

=== Benfica ===
On 1 September 2016, defending champions Benfica announced that Silva had signed a five-year contract with the club, in a deal totalling €16.4 million. His release clause was set at €60 million. He made his debut eight days later, starting in a 2–1 win at Arouca.

In his 14th game, on 22 January 2017, as a late substitute for Kostas Mitroglou, Silva scored his first goal for the team in a 4–0 win over Tondela at the Estádio da Luz. In that season, he also played seven minutes in the final of the domestic cup, won after defeating Vitória de Guimarães 2–1.

Silva scored his ninth league goal of 2018–19 on 2 March 2019, in a 2–1 away victory against Porto; Benfica leapfrogged the opposition and took first place with ten rounds remaining. He ended the season with a career-best 17 league goals, bettered only by teammate Haris Seferovic (23 goals) and Bruno Fernandes (20) in the whole division. After the season ended, his contract was renewed until 2024 and its buyout clause increased to €80 million.

On 4 August 2019, Silva scored the opening goal of a 5–0 win for Benfica in the 2019 Supertaça Cândido de Oliveira, against city rivals Sporting at the Estádio Algarve. On 23 October, he scored his first Champions League goal in a 2–1 victory over Lyon. The following 17 January, days after returning from a three-month injury, he scored both goals in a win away to the same team.

On 25 October 2022, he scored a brace in a 4–3 victory over Juventus, which qualified his club to the knockout phase. On 27 May 2023, he scored a goal in a 3–0 victory over Santa Clara, securing his club's Primeira Liga title for the first time since 2018–19.

On 12 May 2024, he netted a brace and provided an assist in a 5–0 win over Arouca, marking his final match for Benfica at the Estádio da Luz. He finished his last season at the club as top scorer with 14 goals in the league out of 22 in all competitions.

=== Beşiktaş ===
On 25 June 2024, after his contract with Benfica expired, Rafa moved to Turkey, joining Süper Lig side Beşiktaş on a three-year contract. He made a total of 65 appearances for the club, scoring 23 goals and providing 15 assists.

=== Return to Benfica ===
On 22 January 2026, after one-and-a-half years in Turkey, Rafa returned to Benfica, signing a contract until June 2028, for a fee reported to be around €5 million.

== International career ==
Silva made his first appearance for the Portugal under-20 team on 23 April 2013, against Uzbekistan. He was not selected to that year's FIFA U-20 World Cup.

On 28 February 2014, Silva received his first callup for the senior side, for an exhibition game with Cameroon on 5 March. He played the first 45 minutes of the game, in a 5–1 win in Leiria. On 19 May, he was named in the final 23-man squad for the 2014 FIFA World Cup, remaining unused in Brazil as his team were knocked out in the group stage.

After scoring in both games against Azerbaijan in qualification, Silva was part of the under-21 team that finished as runners-up at the 2015 UEFA European Championship in the Czech Republic. He returned to the full side for UEFA Euro 2016, making his only appearance in the competition on 18 June by coming on as an 89th-minute substitute for Nani in a 0–0 draw with Austria at the Parc des Princes.

Silva missed over two years of international football from September 2016 to October 2018, returning against Poland in the UEFA Nations League; he was selected for the final tournament on home soil where he played the final 15 minutes of the 1–0 win over the Netherlands. At UEFA Euro 2020, delayed to 2021, he played two group games off the bench, winning a penalty and assisting Cristiano Ronaldo in a 3–0 win over Hungary.

On 19 September 2022, Silva announced his retirement from international football, citing personal reasons.

== Career statistics ==
=== Club ===
As of match played 8 November 2026

Appearances and goals by club, season and competition
Club	Season	League			National cup (Note: Includes Taça de Portugal, Turkish Cup)		League cup (Note: Includes Taça da Liga)		Europe		Other		Total	
Club	Season	Division	Apps	Goals	Apps	Goals	Apps	Goals	Apps	Goals	Apps	Goals	Apps	Goals
Feirense	2012–13	Segunda Liga	41	10	2	1	4	0	—		—		47	11
Braga	2013–14	Primeira Liga	23	3	5	4	4	2	0	0	—		32	9
Braga	2014–15	Primeira Liga	34	2	6	3	3	0	—		—		43	5
Braga	2015–16	Primeira Liga	30	8	5	0	3	1	12 (Note: Appearances in UEFA Europa League)	3	—		50	12
Braga	2016–17	Primeira Liga	1	0	—		—		—		1 (Note: Appearance in Supertaça Cândido de Oliveira)	0	2	0
Braga	Total		88	13	16	7	10	3	12	3	1	0	127	26
Benfica	2016–17	Primeira Liga	20	2	4	0	4	0	3 (Note: Appearance(s) in UEFA Champions League)	0	—		31	2
Benfica	2017–18	Primeira Liga	20	3	2	0	2	0	1	0	0	0	25	3
Benfica	2018–19	Primeira Liga	26	17	4	2	2	2	12 (Note: Seven appearances in UEFA Champions League, five appearances in UEFA Europa League)	0	—		44	21
Benfica	2019–20	Primeira Liga	25	7	4	1	1	0	5 (Note: Three appearances and one goal in UEFA Champions League, two appearances and one goal in UEFA Europa League)	2	1	1	36	11
Benfica	2020–21	Primeira Liga	29	5	5	1	2	0	9 (Note: One appearance and one goal in UEFA Champions League, eight appearances and two goals in UEFA Europa League)	3	1	0	46	9
Benfica	2021–22	Primeira Liga	28	8	2	1	2	0	13	3	—		45	12
Benfica	2022–23	Primeira Liga	28	8	2	0	3	0	14	6	—		47	14
Benfica	2023–24	Primeira Liga	30	14	6	4	3	0	12 (Note: Six appearances and two goals in UEFA Champions League, six appearances and two goals in UEFA Europa League)	4	1	0	52	22
Benfica	Total		206	64	29	9	19	2	69	18	3	1	326	94
Beşiktaş	2024–25	Süper Lig	35	12	3	2	—		10	3	1 (Note: Appearance in Turkish Super Cup)	1	49	18
Beşiktaş	2025–26	Süper Lig	10	5	0	0	—		6 (Note: Two appearances in UEFA Europa League, four appearances in UEFA Conference League)	0	—		16	5
Beşiktaş	Total		45	17	3	2	—		16	3	1	1	65	23
Benfica	2025–26	Primeira Liga	16	5	—		—		2	1	—		18	6
Benfica	2026–27	Primeira Liga	11	1	0	0	1	0	8	5	—		20	6
Benfica	Total		27	6	0	0	1	0	10	6	—		38	12
Career total			407	110	50	19	34	5	107	30	5	2	603	166

=== International ===
Appearances and goals by national team and year
National team	Year	Apps	Goals
Portugal	2014	3	0
Portugal	2015	2	0
Portugal	2016	5	0
Portugal	2018	3	0
Portugal	2019	4	0
Portugal	2020	1	0
Portugal	2021	7	0
Total		25	0

== Honours ==
Braga

- Taça de Portugal: 2015–16

Benfica

- Primeira Liga: 2016–17, 2018–19, 2022–23
- Taça de Portugal: 2016–17
- Supertaça Cândido de Oliveira: 2017, 2019, 2023

Beşiktaş

- Turkish Super Cup: 2024

Portugal

- UEFA European Championship: 2016
- UEFA Nations League: 2018–19

Individual

- Primeira Liga Goal of the Month: April 2019, March 2022
- Primeira Liga top assist provider: 2021–22, 2023–24

=== Orders ===
- Commander of the Order of Merit
