= İlhan Fakılı =

Turkish footballer (born 2006)

Personal information
- Full name: İlhan Fakılı
- Date of birth: 20 January 2006 (age 20)
- Place of birth: Saint-Priest-en-Jarez, Loire, France
- Height: 1.76 m (5 ft 9 in)
- Position: Left winger

Team information
- Current team: Beşiktaş
- Number: 29

Youth career
- 2011–2012: Saint-Étienne UC Terrenoire
- 2012–2019: Saint-Étienne
- 2019–2021: Andrézieux-Bouthéon
- 2021–2024: Clermont Foot

Senior career*
Years	Team	Apps	(Gls)
2024–2026	Clermont Foot	41	(4)
2026–	Beşiktaş	10	(2)

International career^{‡}
2026–	Turkey U21	2	(0)
2026–	Turkey	2	(0)
- * Club domestic league appearances and goals as of 22:30, 8 November 2026 (UTC) ‡ National team caps and goals as of 22:30, 5 October 2026 (UTC)

İlhan Fakılı (born 20 January 2006) is a professional footballer who plays as a left winger for Süper Lig club Beşiktaş. Born in France, he represents the Turkey national team.

== Club career ==
=== Youth career ===
Fakılı was born in Saint-Priest-en-Jarez in the Loire department of France to Turkish parents and began his youth career at local club Saint-Étienne UC Terrenoire before joining the Saint-Étienne academy, where he spent seven years from 2012 to 2019. He then moved to Andrézieux-Bouthéon FC before joining the Clermont Foot academy in July 2021.

In the 2022–23 season, Fakılı was a key member of Clermont's under-18 side that reached the final of the Coupe Gambardella, scoring three goals in six matches during the run. In the semi-final against Rennes, he converted the decisive penalty in the shootout to send Clermont to the final at the Stade de France, where they were defeated 2–4 by AS Monaco.

=== Clermont Foot ===
In March 2024, Fakılı signed his first professional contract with Clermont Foot, committing to the club until June 2027. The club cited his performances in the Coupe Gambardella and his integration into training sessions with the first-team squad under Pascal Gastien as key factors in the decision.

After suffering ankle injuries that limited his availability during the early part of his professional career, Fakılı established himself as a regular in the Clermont first team during the 2025–26 Ligue 2 season.

=== Beşiktaş ===
On 5 July 2026, Fakılı joined Süper Lig club Beşiktaş on a four-year deal.

== International career ==
Fakılı was born in France and is of Turkish descent, and holds dual-citizenship. In August 2022, he was called up to the France U17s. He was called up to the Turkey under-21 squad for the friendly against Kosovo on 3 June 2026.

On 18 September 2026, Fakılı was called up by Vincenzo Montella for the UEFA Nations League matches against France, Italy and Belgium. On 2 October 2026, he made his senior national debut against Belgium as 66th-minute substitute in a 3–0 away defeat.

== Personal life ==
Fakılı's brother Kenan Fakılı is also a professional footballer.
