= Aytuğ Batur Kömeç =

Turkish footballer

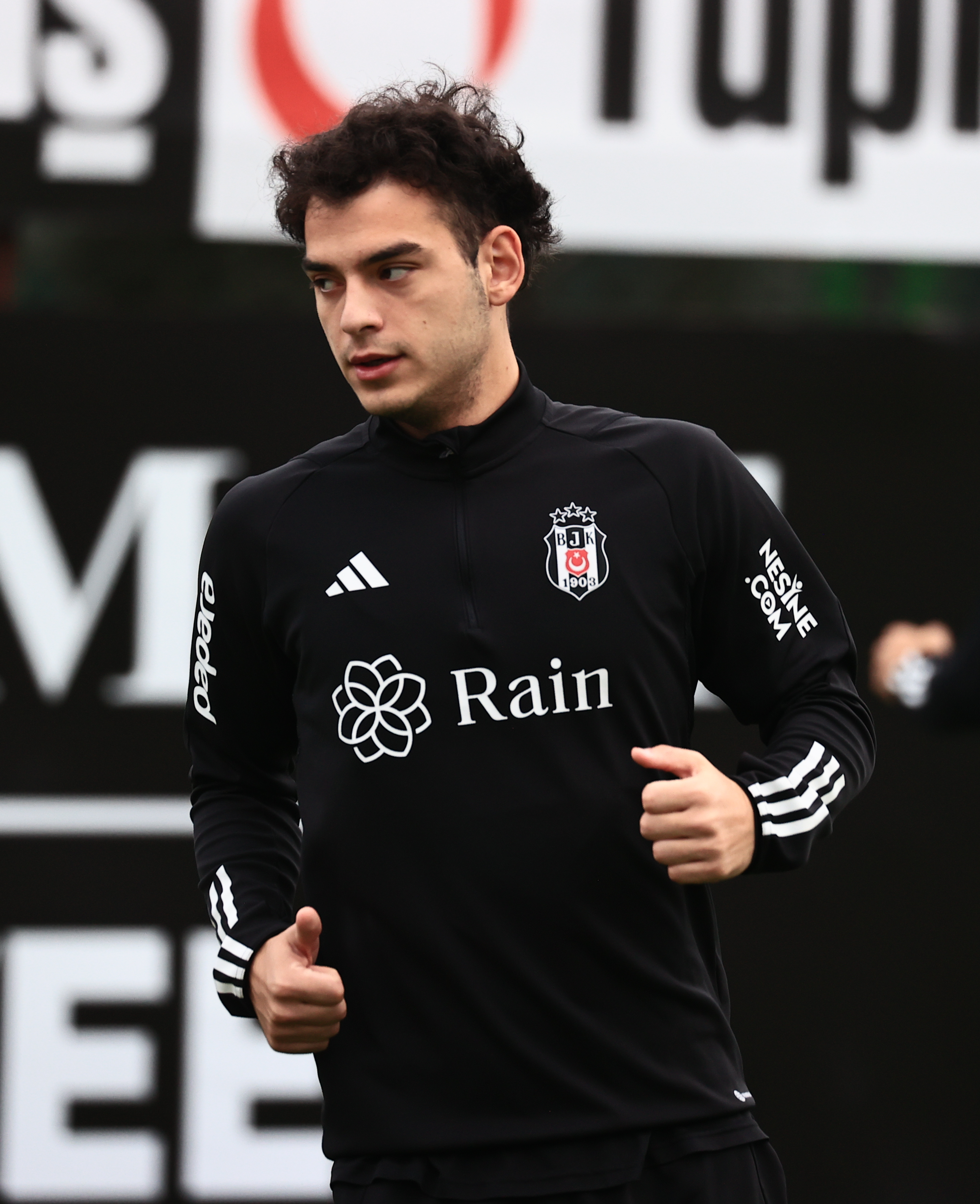

Personal information
- Date of birth: 5 October 2004 (age 22)
- Place of birth: Gaziosmanpaşa, Turkey
- Height: 1.85 m (6 ft 1 in)
- Position: Centre-back

Team information
- Current team: İnkılap Futbol Spor Kulübü
- Number: 15

Youth career
- 2014–2015: Galatasaray
- 2015–2017: Altınordu
- 2017–2022: Beşiktaş

Senior career*
Years	Team	Apps	(Gls)
2022–2024	Beşiktaş	0	(0)
2024	→ IMT (loan)	0	(0)
2024–2025	Isparta 32 Spor	2	(0)
2025–2026	Kuşadasıspor	8	(0)
2026–	İnkılap Futbol Spor Kulübü	25	(0)

International career^{‡}
2022–2023	Turkey U19	4	(0)
- * Club domestic league appearances and goals as of 22:53, 12 April 2025 (UTC) ‡ National team caps and goals as of 04:53, 15 December 2023 (UTC)

Aytuğ Batur Kömeç (Serbian: Аjтуг Батур Комеч; born 5 October 2004) is a Turkish professional footballer who plays as a centre-back for TFF Third League club İnkılap Futbol Spor Kulübü.

== Club career ==
Kömeç is a youth product of Galatasaray and Altınordu, before moving to the youth academy of Beşiktaş in 2017. On 20 May 2022, he signed his first professional contract with Beşiktaş. He made his professional debut with Beşiktaş as a substitute in a 5–1 UEFA Europa Conference League loss to Club Brugge on 30 November 2023.

On 13 July 2024 Kömeç was loaned to Serbian SuperLiga club IMT until the end of the season

On 11 September 2024 Kömeç's contract was terminated and he permanently transferred to Isparta 32 Spor

== International career ==
Born in Turkey, Kömeç is of Serbian descent. In September 2023 he was called up by the Serbia U21s, but declined as he would have been considered a foreign player in his club. He has played for the Turkey U19s making 4 appearances.
