= Milot Rashica =

Kosovar footballer (born 1996)

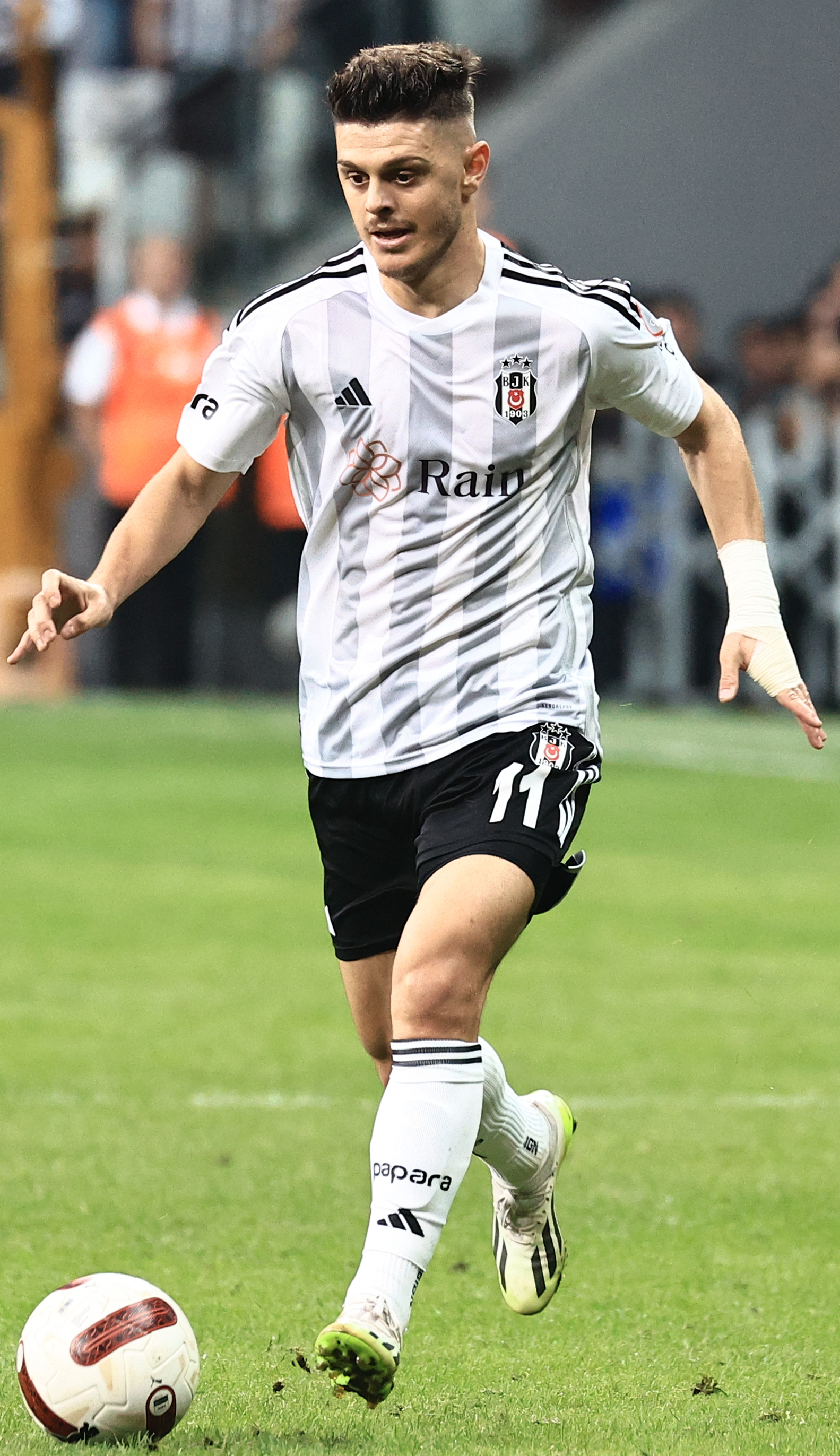
- Rashica with Beşiktaş in 2023

Personal information
- Full name: Milot Rashica
- Date of birth: 28 June 1996 (age 30)
- Place of birth: Vučitrn, FR Yugoslavia (now Vushtrri, Kosovo)
- Height: 1.78 m (5 ft 10 in)
- Positions: Attacking midfielder; winger

Team information
- Current team: Beşiktaş
- Number: 7

Youth career
- 2008–2012: Kurda
- 2012–2013: Vushtrria

Senior career*
Years	Team	Apps	(Gls)
2013–2015	Vushtrria	21	(9)
2015–2018	Vitesse	83	(13)
2018–2021	Werder Bremen	87	(21)
2021–2023	Norwich City	35	(1)
2022–2023	→ Galatasaray (loan)	26	(4)
2023–	Beşiktaş	85	(9)

International career^{‡}
2012	Albania U17	3	(1)
2013	Kosovo U21	1	(0)
2014	Albania U19	5	(0)
2015–2016	Albania U21	6	(1)
2016	Albania	2	(0)
2016–	Kosovo	68	(12)
- * Club domestic league appearances and goals as of 23:24, 1 November 2026 (UTC) ‡ National team caps and goals as of 15:25, 14 November 2026 (UTC)

Milot Rashica (Albanian pronunciation: [ˈmilot ɾaˈʃitsa]; born 28 June 1996) is a Kosovan professional footballer who plays as an attacking midfielder or winger for Süper Lig club Beşiktaş and the Kosovo national team.

== Club career ==
=== Early career ===
Rashica was born in Vučitrn, FR Yugoslavia, in present-day Kosovo to ethnic Albanian parents. He made his professional debut with local club Vushtrria, aged only 16. In August 2013, after a trial period at Gent, he refused a transfer offer from the club and made his senior debut with Vushtrria.

In September 2013, after suffering an injury, Rashica moved to Hannover for treatment and only returned to his parent club in 2014.

=== Vitesse ===
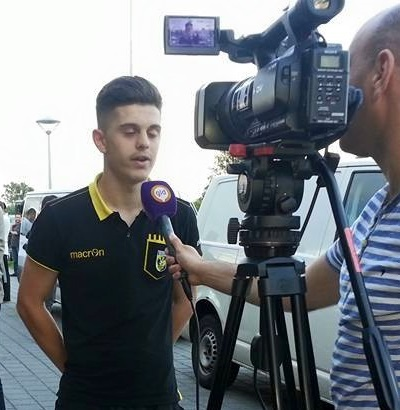
Rashica with Vitesse in January 2016

On 10 September 2014, Rashica moved to Vitesse on a trial basis, appearing for the club's youth team. On 10 February 2015, he signed a three-year deal with the Arnhem side, being effective on 1 July, for a reported €300,000 fee.

On 30 July 2015, Rashica made his professional debut, coming on as a second-half substitute for Uroš Đurđević in a 3–0 away loss against Southampton for the third qualifying round of 2015–16 UEFA Europa League. On 9 August, he made his Eredivisie debut, starting and assisting Denys Oliynyk in a 1–1 away draw against Willem II.

On 20 September 2015, Rashica scored his first professional goal, netting the last in a 3–0 home victory against De Graafschap. On 18 December, he scored a brace in a 5–1 routing of Twente also at the GelreDome.

He played as Vitesse won the final of the KNVB Beker 2–0 against AZ Alkmaar on 30 April 2017 to lead the club, three-time runners up, to the title for the first time in its 125-year history.

=== Werder Bremen ===
On 31 January 2018, Rashica joined Bundesliga side Werder Bremen, reportedly signing a 4.5-year contract until 2022. On 3 February 2018, he made his debut in a 2–1 away win against Schalke 04 after being named in the Werder Bremen starting eleven.

Rashica started in Werder Bremen's first match of the 2019–20 season against Fortuna Düsseldorf and assisted Johannes Eggestein's goal before sustaining an injury and being subbed off. He scored his first goal of the 2019–20 season on his return from an injury, on the sixth matchday of the season against Borussia Dortmund in a 2–2 draw against the black and yellows.

=== Norwich City ===
On 22 June 2021, Rashica signed a four-year contract with the newly promoted Premier League club Norwich City, and received squad number 17. Norwich City reportedly paid a €11 million transfer fee plus a possible €4 million in bonuses. On 14 August 2021, he made his debut in a 3–0 home defeat against Liverpool after being named in the starting line-up.

Rashica scored his first goal for Norwich City in January 2022, when he netted the winning goal in an FA Cup tie at Charlton Athletic. He provided an assist for Josh Sargent as Norwich City moved out of the Premier League relegation zone with a 3–0 win over Watford. He scored his first Premier League goal for Norwich when he scored the first goal in a 3–1 defeat away to Liverpool at Anfield; in doing so he became the first Kosovan to score in the Premier League.

==== Loan to Galatasaray ====
On 8 September 2022, Rashica joined Süper Lig side Galatasaray, on a season-long loan. Galatasaray will reportedly pay him a €1.5 million net fee. His debut with Galatasaray came three days later in a 3–2 away win against Kasımpaşa after coming on as a substitute at 83rd minute in place of Yunus Akgün. He scored his first goal against Giresunspor on 28 January 2023, after substituting in place of Dries Mertens. As of early March 2023, he scored 2 goals and gave 3 assists in 18 official games he played for Galatasaray.

Rashica became the champion in the Süper Lig in the 2022–23 season with Galatasaray. Defeating Ankaragücü 4–1 away in the match played in the 36th week on 30 May 2023, Galatasaray secured the lead with two weeks before the end and won the 23rd championship in its history.

=== Beşiktaş ===
On 15 August 2023, Rashica signed a four-year contract with Süper Lig club Beşiktaş.

== International career ==
=== Albania U17 ===
Rashica was called up to Albania's under-17 team by coach Džemal Mustedanagić for the 2013 UEFA European Under-17 Championship qualifying round in October 2012, and made his debut for the side on the 18th, starting in a 1–0 loss against Italy. Five days later, he scored the fifth in a 6–0 routing of Liechtenstein; he appeared in three matches and scored once, as Albania was knocked out after finishing third in its group.

=== Kosovo U21 ===
In June 2013, Rashica was named as part of the Kosovo U21 squad for 2013 Valais Youth Cup. On 15 June 2013, he made his debut with Kosovo U21 in 2013 Valais Youth Cup third place play-off against Egypt U20 after coming on as a substitute in the 45th minute in place of Gentrit Begolli.

=== Return to Albania ===
==== Under-19 ====
On 7 November 2014, Rashica was called up to the under-19s by coach Altin Lala ahead of 2015 UEFA European Under-19 Championship qualifying round. He appeared against Denmark, Portugal and Wales, as Albania was again eliminated.

==== Under-21 ====
On 28 August 2015, Rashica was included in Redi Jupi's under-21 squad for the 2017 UEFA European Under-21 Championship qualification matches against Israel and Portugal. He made his debut on 3 September, playing the full 90 minutes in a 1–1 home draw against the former, and also suffering a penalty which was later converted by Endri Çekiçi.

==== Senior ====
Rashica made his debut for the full squad on 29 March 2016, coming on as a second-half substitute for Ledian Memushaj in a 2–0 friendly win against Luxembourg. He only appeared in one further match for the national setup, a 3–1 win against Qatar on 29 May.

=== Return to Kosovo ===
On 15 August 2016, it was announced that Rashica had switched to Kosovo. On 30 August 2016, he received a call-up from Kosovo for a 2018 FIFA World Cup qualification match against Finland and made his debut after being named in the starting line-up.

== Career statistics ==
=== Club ===
As of match played 27 August 2026

Appearances and goals by club, season and competition
Club	Season	League			National cup (Note: Includes KNVB Cup, DFB-Pokal, FA Cup, Turkish Cup)		League cup (Note: Includes EFL Cup)		Europe		Other		Total	
Club	Season	Division	Apps	Goals	Apps	Goals	Apps	Goals	Apps	Goals	Apps	Goals	Apps	Goals
Vushtrria	2013–14	Kosovo Superleague	5	2			—		—		—		5	2
Vushtrria	2014–15	Kosovo Superleague	16	7			—		—		—		16	7
Vushtrria	Total		21	9			—		—		—		21	9
Vitesse	2015–16	Eredivisie	31	8	1	0	—		2 (Note: Appearances in UEFA Europa League)	0	—		34	8
Vitesse	2016–17	Eredivisie	33	2	6	2	—		—		—		39	4
Vitesse	2017–18	Eredivisie	19	3	1	0	—		6	0	1 (Note: Appearance in Johan Cruyff Shield)	0	27	3
Vitesse	Total		83	13	8	2	—		8	0	1	0	100	15
Werder Bremen	2017–18	Bundesliga	9	1	1	0	—		—		—		10	1
Werder Bremen	2018–19	Bundesliga	26	9	4	3	—		—		—		30	12
Werder Bremen	2019–20	Bundesliga	28	8	4	3	—		—		2 (Note: Appearances in Bundesliga relegation play-offs)	0	34	11
Werder Bremen	2020–21	Bundesliga	24	3	2	0	—		—		—		26	3
Werder Bremen	Total		87	21	11	6	—		—		2	0	100	27
Norwich City	2021–22	Premier League	31	1	3	1	1	0	—		—		35	2
Norwich City	2022–23	Championship	4	0	0	0	1	0	—		—		5	0
Norwich City	Total		35	1	3	1	2	0	—		—		40	2
Galatasaray (loan)	2022–23	Süper Lig	26	4	4	2	—		—		—		30	6
Beşiktaş	2023–24	Süper Lig	29	5	6	0	—		6 (Note: Appearances in UEFA Europa Conference League)	0	—		41	5
Beşiktaş	2024–25	Süper Lig	28	3	4	0	—		8	2	1 (Note: Appearance in Turkish Super Cup)	0	41	5
Beşiktaş	2025–26	Süper Lig	25	1	5	0	—		3 (Note: Two appearances in UEFA Europa League, one appearance and one goal in UEFA Conference League)	1	—		33	2
Beşiktaş	2026–27	Süper Lig	1	0	0	0	—		5	1	—		6	1
Beşiktaş	Total		83	9	15	0	—		22	4	1	0	121	13
Career total			335	57	40	11	3	0	29	4	4	0	412	72

=== International ===
As of match played 14 November 2026

Appearances and goals by national team, year and competition
National team	Year	Apps	Goals
Albania	2016	2	0
Albania	Total	2	0
Kosovo	2016	4	0
Kosovo	2017	7	0
Kosovo	2018	9	2
Kosovo	2019	7	2
Kosovo	2020	1	0
Kosovo	2021	10	2
Kosovo	2022	8	2
Kosovo	2023	7	3
Kosovo	2024	6	1
Kosovo	2025	3	0
Kosovo	2026	5	0
Kosovo	Total	68	12
Career total		70	12

As of 1 October 2026
Scores and results list Kosovo's goal tally first, score column indicates score after each Rashica goal.

List of international goals scored by Milot Rashica
No.	Date	Venue	Cap	Opponent	Score	Result	Competition
1	14 October 2018	Tórsvøllur, Tórshavn, Faroe Islands	18	Faroe Islands	1–0	1–1	2018–19 UEFA Nations League D
2	17 November 2018	National Stadium, Ta' Qali, Malta	19	Malta	5–0	5–0	2018–19 UEFA Nations League D
3	7 June 2019	Podgorica City Stadium, Podgorica, Montenegro	23	Montenegro	1–0	1–1	UEFA Euro 2020 qualifying
4	10 June 2019	Vasil Levski National Stadium, Sofia, Bulgaria	24	Bulgaria	1–0	3–2	UEFA Euro 2020 qualifying
5	4 June 2021	Wörthersee Stadion, Klagenfurt, Austria	32	Malta	1–0	2–1	Friendly
6	4 June 2021	Wörthersee Stadion, Klagenfurt, Austria	32	Malta	2–1	2–1	Friendly
7	24 March 2022	Fadil Vokrri Stadium, Pristina, Kosovo	39	Burkina Faso	4–0	5–0	Friendly
8	29 March 2022	Letzigrund, Zürich, Switzerland	40	Switzerland	1–0	1–1	Friendly
9	12 October 2023	Estadi Nacional, Andorra la Vella, Andorra	52	Andorra	1–0	3–0	UEFA Euro 2024 qualifying
10	12 October 2023	Estadi Nacional, Andorra la Vella, Andorra	52	Andorra	2–0	3–0	UEFA Euro 2024 qualifying
11	12 November 2023	Fadil Vokrri Stadium, Pristina, Kosovo	53	Israel	1–0	1–0	UEFA Euro 2024 qualifying
12	22 March 2024	Vazgen Sargsyan Republican Stadium, Yerevan, Armenia	54	Armenia	1–0	1–0	Friendly

== Honours ==
Vushtrria

- Kosovo Superleague: 2013–14

Vitesse

- KNVB Cup: 2016–17

Galatasaray

- Süper Lig: 2022–23

Besiktas

- Turkish Cup: 2023–24
- Turkish Super Cup: 2024
