= Mustafa Erhan Hekimoğlu =

Turkish footballer

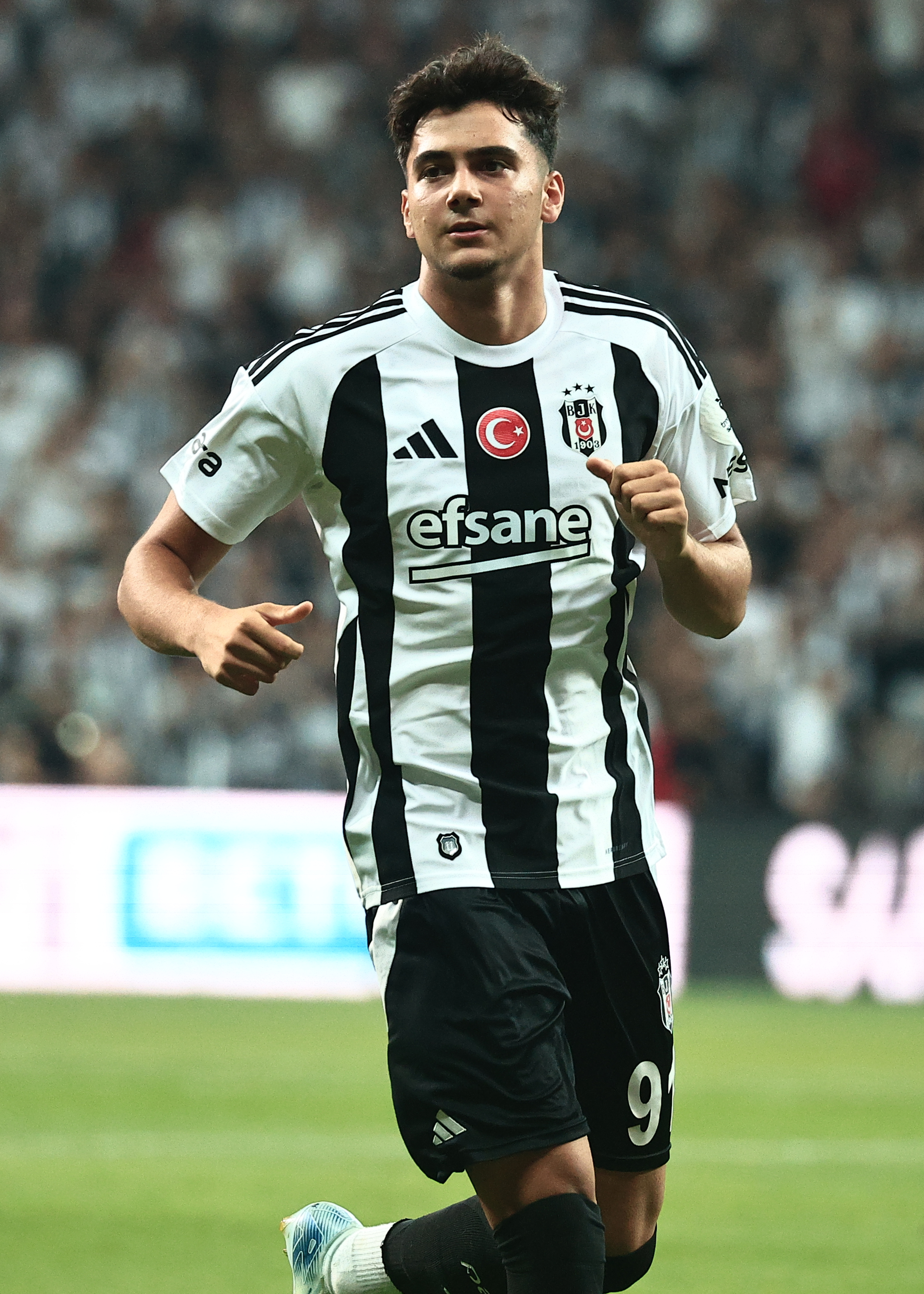
- Hekimoğlu in 2024

Personal information
- Full name: Mustafa Erhan Hekimoğlu
- Date of birth: 22 April 2007 (age 19)
- Place of birth: Kağıthane, Turkey
- Height: 1.86 m (6 ft 1 in)
- Position: Forward

Team information
- Current team: Beşiktaş
- Number: 23

Youth career
- 2017–2023: Beşiktaş

Senior career*
Years	Team	Apps	(Gls)
2023–	Beşiktaş	43	(3)

International career^{‡}
2022	Turkey U15	2	(1)
2022–2023	Turkey U16	12	(3)
2023	Turkey U17	8	(4)
2024	Turkey U18	3	(1)
2024–	Turkey U21	7	(1)
- * Club domestic league appearances and goals as of 22:40, 15 May 2026 (UTC) ‡ National team caps and goals as of 07:29, 12 August 2026 (UTC)

Mustafa Erhan Hekimoğlu (born 22 April 2007) is a Turkish professional footballer who plays as a forward for the Süper Lig club Beşiktaş.

== Club career ==
Hekimoğlu is solely a product of Beşiktaş's youth academy. On 30 November 2022, he signed a professional contract with them until 2026. In the 2022–23 season he captained their U16s and scored 17 goals in 18 matches for them. He made his professional debut with Beşiktaş as a substitute in a 2–0 UEFA Europa Conference League win over Lugano on 14 December 2023.

On 17 February 2025, he extended his contract until 2028.

== International career ==
Hekimoğlu is a youth international for Turkey, having played for their U15s and U16s. In August 2023, he was called up to the Turkey U17s.

== Honours ==
Beşiktaş

- Turkish Cup: 2023–24
- Turkish Super Cup: 2024
