= 2024–25 Samsunspor season =

Samsunspor
2024–25 season
- President: Yüksel Yıldırım
- Head coach: Thomas Reis
- Süper Lig: 3rd
- Turkish Cup: Fourth round
- Top goalscorer: League: Marius Mouandilmadji (11 goals); All: Marius Mouandilmadji (11 goals)
- Average home league attendance: 16,099

The 2024–25 season was the 58th season in the history of Samsunspor, and the club's second consecutive season in Süper Lig. In addition to the domestic league, the team participated in the Turkish Cup.

== Transfers ==
=== In ===
Pos.	Player	Transferred to	Fee	Date	Source
FW	(Turkey) Ahmet Sağat	(Turkey) Kocaelispor	7 million TL	17 July 2024	

== Friendlies ==
=== Pre-season ===
15 July 2024 Friendly	Kayserispor (Turkey)	1–3	(Turkey) Samsunspor	Kayseri
18:00 UTC+3

22 July 2024 Friendly	Samsunspor (Turkey)	v	(Netherlands) Almere City	Kayseri
17:00 UTC+3

== Competitions ==
=== Overall record ===
Competition	First match	Last match	Starting round	Record							
Competition	First match	Last match	Starting round	Pld	W	D	L	GF	GA	GD	Win %
Süper Lig	9–12 August 2024		Matchday 1	10	7	1	2	20	10	+10	70.00
Turkish Cup				0	0	0	0	0	0	+0	—
Total				10	7	1	2	20	10	+10	70.00

Last updated: 27 October 2024
Source: FBREF

=== Süper Lig ===
==== League table ====
Pos	Team	Pld	W	D	L	GF	GA	GD	Pts	Qualification or relegation
1	Galatasaray (C)	36	30	5	1	91	31	+60	95	Qualification for the Champions League league phase
2	Fenerbahçe	36	26	6	4	90	39	+51	84	Qualification for the Champions League third qualifying round
3	Samsunspor	36	19	7	10	55	41	+14	64	Qualification for the Europa League play-off round (Note: The 2024–25 Turkish Cup winners qualified for the Europa League play-off round. Since the cup winners (Galatasaray) qualified based on league position, the Europa League play-off round spot was passed to the third-placed team, the Europa League second round spot was passed to the fourth-placed team, and the Conference League spot was passed to the fifth-placed team.)
4	Beşiktaş	36	17	11	8	59	36	+23	62	Qualification for the Europa League second qualifying round
5	Başakşehir	36	16	6	14	60	56	+4	54	Qualification for the Conference League second qualifying round

Source: Süper Lig
Rules for classification: 1) Points; 2) Head-to-head points; 3) Head-to-head goal difference; 4) Head-to-head goals scored; 5) Goal difference; 6) Goals scored; 7) Play-off.
(Note: Head-to-head record is used only after all the matches between the teams in question have been played)
(C) Champions

==== Results summary ====
Overall								Home						Away					
Pld	W	D	L	GF	GA	GD	Pts	W	D	L	GF	GA	GD	W	D	L	GF	GA	GD
16	9	3	4	29	17	+12	30	4	2	2	15	9	+6	5	1	2	14	8	+6

Last updated: 21 December 2024.
Source: Süper Lig

==== Results by round ====
Round	1	2	3	4	5	6	7	8	9	10	11	12	13	14	15	16	17	18	19	20	21	22	23	24	25	26	27	28	29	30	31	32	33	34	35	36
Ground	H	A	A	H	H	A	H	A	H	A	H	A	H	H	A	A	H	A	A	H	A	H	A	H	A	H	A	H	A	H	A	A	H	H	A	H
Result	L	W	W	L	W	W	W	W	D	W	W	L	D	W	L		D																			
Position	19	10	5	4	6	4	4	2	3	2	2	3	3	3	3		3																			

Updated to match(es) played on 21 December 2024. Source: Süper Lig
A = Away; H = Home; W = Win; D = Draw; L = Loss

==== Matches ====
The match schedule was released on 11 July 2024.

Win Draw Loss Postponed

11 August 2024 1	Samsunspor	0–2	Beşiktaş	Samsun
21:45 UTC+3	Muja (yellow card) 21'; Van Drongelen (yellow card) 45+2'	Report	Masuaku (yellow card) 17'; Silva 31'; Gabriel Paulista 36'	Stadium: Samsun 19 Mayıs Stadium; Attendance: 20,290; Referee: Ali Şansalan

18 August 2024 2	Gaziantep	0–1	Samsunspor	Gaziantep
22:45 EEST	Ersoy (yellow card) 29'; Kozłowski (yellow card) 41'; Enric Saborit (yellow card) 90+5'	Report	Holse 5'; Bennasser (yellow card) 77'; Yüksel (yellow card) 82'; Dimata (yellow card) 90+5'	Stadium: Gaziantep Stadium; Attendance: 3,831; Referee: (Turkey) Atilla Karaoğlan

1 September 2024 4	Hatayspor	0–3	Samsunspor	Mersin
22:45 EEST		Report	Bennasser (yellow card) 17'; Muja 37'; Mouandilmadji 51'; Bola (yellow card) 59'; Ntcham 75'	Stadium: Mersin Stadium; Attendance: 2,216; Referee: (Turkey) Cihan Aydın

14 September 2024 5	Samsunspor	0–1	Konyaspor	Samsun
18:00 EEST		Report	Pedrinho 30'; Boranijašević (yellow card) 87'; Ülgün (yellow card) 90+7'	Stadium: Samsun 19 Mayıs Stadium; Attendance: 11,322; Referee: (Turkey) Oğuzhan Çakır

18 September 2024 3	Samsunspor	2–0	İstanbul Başakşehir	Samsun
21:00 EEST	Yavru (yellow card) 34'; Mouandilmadji 65' (yellow card) 76'; Kılınç (yellow card) 68'; van Drongelen 72'; Yüksel (yellow card) 90+3'; Bola (yellow card) 90+6'	Report	Léo Duarte (yellow card) 49'; Özdemir (yellow card) 90+6'	Stadium: Samsun 19 Mayıs Stadium; Attendance: 10,060; Referee: (Turkey) Direnç Tonusluoğlu

22 September 2024 6	Rizespor	0–1	Samsunspor	Rize
18:00 EEST	Højer (yellow card) 3'; Bulut (yellow card) 59'	Report	Ntcham 46' (yellow card) 87'; Kocuk (yellow card) 83'	Stadium: Çaykur Didi Stadium; Attendance: 5,860; Referee: (Turkey) Kadir Sağlam

28 September 2024 7	Samsunspor	4–3	Göztepe	Samsun
17:00 EEST	Mouandilmadji 28'; Ntcham 70' 90+1'; Schindler 79'	Report	Rômulo Cardoso 41'; Juan 50'; Lis (yellow card) 55'; Bokele (yellow card) 56'	Stadium: Samsun 19 Mayıs Stadium; Attendance: 14,020; Referee: (Turkey) Mehmet Türkmen

6 October 2024 8	Adana Demirspor	1–3	Samsunspor	Adana
17:00 EEST	Barası 7' (pen.); Salih Kavrazlı (yellow card) 14'; Aymbetov (yellow card) 78'; Abdulsamet Burak (yellow card) 90'	Report	Šatka (yellow card) 25'; Yavru (yellow card) 37'; van Drongelen (yellow card) 39'; Muja 58'; Dimata 90+3'; Aydoğdu 90+10'	Stadium: New Adana Stadium; Attendance: 6,637; Referee: (Turkey) Alper Akarsu

20 October 2024 9	Samsunspor	2–2	Fenerbahçe	Samsun
19:00 TRT (UTC+3)	Šatka (yellow card) 13'; Ntcham (yellow card) 14'; Holse 48'; Kılınç (yellow card) 55'; Bola (yellow card) 57'; Aït Bennasser (yellow card) 76'; Aydoğdu 88'; Mouandilmadji (yellow card) 90+5'	Report	Kostić (yellow card) 9'; Tadić 24'; Fred (yellow card) 40'; Becão (yellow card) 52'; Saint-Maximin 62'; Kahveci (yellow card) 89'; Djiku (yellow card) 90+5'	Stadium: Samsun 19 Mayıs Stadium; Referee: Muhammet Ali Metoğlu

26 October 2024 10	Kasımpaşa	1–4	Samsunspor	Istanbul
17:00 EEST	Ben Ouanes (yellow card) 16'; Kara 31' (yellow card) 36'; Hajradinović (yellow card) 45+4'; Opoku (yellow card) 76'	Report	van Drongelen (yellow card) 45+5'; Ntcham (yellow card) 49'; Holse 68' 77'; Aydoğdu 71'; Tait 86'	Stadium: Recep Tayyip Erdoğan Stadium; Attendance: 2,405; Referee: (Turkey) Çağdaş Altay

4 November 2024 11	Samsunspor	2–0	Antalyaspor	Samsun
20:00 EEST	Yavru (yellow card) 13'; Holse 45'; Dimata 49' (yellow card) 68'; Schindler (yellow card) 65'	Report	Djenepo (yellow card) 41'	Stadium: Samsun 19 Mayıs Stadium; Attendance: 21,661; Referee: (Turkey) Direnç Tonusluoğlu

10 November 2024 12	Galatasaray	3–2	Samsunspor	Sarıyer, Istanbul
16:00 TRT (UTC+3)	Osimhen 3' (yellow card) 34' (goal) 55'; Muslera (yellow card) 49'; Sánchez (yellow card) 70'; Batshuayi 85'	Report	Bennasser (yellow card) 30' (goal) 90+3' (pen.); Ntcham 50' (pen.); Kılınç (yellow card) 55'; Tait (yellow card) 90+5'; Muja (yellow card) 90+7'	Stadium: Rams Park; Attendance: 46,940; Referee: (Turkey) Halil Umut Meler

24 November 2024 13	Samsunspor	1–1	Alanyaspor	Samsun
16:00 TRT (UTC+3)	Dimata 35'; Mouandilmadji (yellow card) 41'	Report	Nuno Lima (yellow card) 21'; Córdova 46' (yellow card) 90+8'; Janvier (yellow card) 64'; Taşkıran (yellow card) 90'	Stadium: Samsun 19 Mayıs Stadium; Attendance: 11,284; Referee: (Turkey) Zorbay Küçük

30 November 2024 14	Samsunspor	4–0	Bodrum	Samsun
13:30 TRT (UTC+3)	van Drongelen 6'; Mouandilmadji 51' 55'; Aydoğdu 90+3'	Report		Stadium: Samsun 19 Mayıs Stadium; Attendance: 9,940; Referee: (Turkey) Ozan Ergün

8 December 2024 15	Eyüpspor	3–0	Samsunspor	Istanbul
13:30 TRT (UTC+3)	Akbaba (yellow card) 15'; Yalçın (yellow card) 45+1'; Thiam 54' 69'; Akbunar 64'	Report	Bennasser (yellow card) 53'; Kılınç (yellow card) 80'	Stadium: Recep Tayyip Erdoğan Stadium; Attendance: 4,082; Referee: (Turkey) Atilla Karaoğlan

16	Bye

21 December 2024 17	Sivasspor	0–0	Samsunspor	Sivas
16:00 EEST	Charisis (yellow card) 49'; Garry Rodrigues (yellow card) 65'; Manaj (yellow card) 88' (yellow-red card) 90'	Report	Muja (yellow card) 38'; van Drongelen (yellow card) 40'; Holse (yellow card) 84'	Stadium: New Sivas 4 Eylül Stadium; Attendance: 4,515; Referee: (Turkey) Ali Şansalan

4 January 2025 18	Samsunspor	–	Trabzonspor	Samsun
20:00 EEST				Stadium: Samsun 19 Mayıs Stadium

=== Turkish Cup ===
31 October 2024 Third round	Bayburt Özel İdarespor	0–0 (a.e.t.) (2–4 p)	Samsunspor	Bayburt
13:00 EEST	Mete Tinmaz (yellow card) 23'; Mehmet Aygün (yellow card) 86'	Report	Çetin (yellow card) 72'; Çift (yellow card) 74'; Elano Yegen (yellow card) 84'	Stadium: Genç Osman Stadium; Referee: (Turkey) Erkan Özdamar

3 December 2024 Fourth round	Samsunspor	2–4 (a.e.t.)	52 Orduspor	Samsun
20:30 EEST	Kara 25' (pen.); Aydoğdu 41'; Çift (yellow card) 75' (yellow-red card) 78'	Report	Harun Özcan 16'; Hüseyin Furkan Uslu (yellow card) 24'; Emre Fırtına (yellow card) 28'; Yusuf Atasoy 79' (pen.); Yunus Emre Köse 96'; Nevzat Bilen (yellow card) 98' (goal) 105+1'	Stadium: Samsun 19 Mayıs Stadium; Referee: (Turkey) Gürcan Hasova
