= 2023–24 Samsunspor season =

Samsunspor
2023–24 season
- President: Yüksel Yıldırım
- Head coach: Hüseyin Eroğlu
- Stadium: Samsun Stadium
- Süper Lig: 13th
- Turkish Cup: Round of 16
- Top goalscorer: League: Marius Mouandilmadji (9); All: Marius Mouandilmadji (10)
- Average home league attendance: 17,119
Home colours	Away colours	Third colours

The 2023–24 season was Samsunspor's 59th season in existence and first one back in the Süper Lig, the top division of association football in Turkey. They also competed in the Turkish Cup.

== Players ==
=== First-team squad ===
As of 6 September 2023

Note: Flags indicate national team as defined under FIFA eligibility rules; some limited exceptions apply. Players may hold more than one non-FIFA nationality.

No.	Pos.	Nation	Player
1	GK	TUR	Okan Kocuk
4	DF	NED	Rick van Drongelen
5	DF	TUR	Alim Öztürk
6	MF	MAR	Youssef Aït Bennasser
7	FW	CIV	Moryké Fofana
8	MF	TUR	Soner Aydoğdu
9	FW	CHA	Marius Mouandilmadji
10	MF	CMR	Olivier Ntcham
11	MF	TUR	Emre Kılınç
16	DF	ENG	Marc Bola
17	MF	GHA	Kingsley Schindler
18	DF	TUR	Zeki Yavru
19	DF	GBS	Nanu
20	MF	TUR	Muhammet Ali Özbaskıcı
22	DF	TUR	Yunus Emre Çift

No.	Pos.	Nation	Player
27	FW	COD	Gaëtan Laura
28	DF	TUR	Soner Gönül
29	GK	POL	Jakub Szumski
37	DF	SVK	Ľubomír Šatka
45	GK	TUR	Halil Yeral
48	MF	TUR	Taylan Antalyalı (On loan from Galatasaray)
64	GK	TUR	Taha Tosun
77	DF	TUR	Enes Albak
88	MF	TUR	Osman Çelik
96	DF	TUR	Bedirhan Çetin
—	FW	BEL	Landry Dimata
—	FW	AUT	Ercan Kara
—	MF	DEN	Carlo Holse
—	MF	FRA	Flavien Tait

==== Out on loan ====
Note: Flags indicate national team as defined under FIFA eligibility rules; some limited exceptions apply. Players may hold more than one non-FIFA nationality.

No.	Pos.	Nation	Player
—	MF	TUR	Celil Yüksel (at Göztepe until 30 June 2024)
—	MF	TUR	Barış Alıcı (at Kocaelispor until 30 June 2024)
—	MF	CIV	Moussa Guel (at USL Dunkerque until 30 June 2024)
—	DF	TUR	Berk Taşkın (at Ümraniyespor until 30 June 2024)

No.	Pos.	Nation	Player
—	MF	TUR	Şener Kaya (at Amed S.F.K. until 30 June 2024)
—	FW	GUI	Elhadj Bah (at USL Dunkerque until 30 June 2024)
—	DF	TUR	Elano Yegen (at 1461 Trabzon until 30 June 2024)
—	FW	TUR	Ali Kılıç (at Gümüşhanespor until 30 June 2024)

==== Other players under contract ====
Note: Flags indicate national team as defined under FIFA eligibility rules; some limited exceptions apply. Players may hold more than one non-FIFA nationality.

No.	Pos.	Nation	Player
—	FW	GER	Ahmet Sağat
—	MF	ENG	Kadeem Harris
—	DF	TUR	Melih Altıkulaç

== Transfers ==
=== In ===
Pos.	Player	Transferred from	Fee	Date	Source
FW	(Belgium) Landry Dimata	(Spain) Espanyol	Undisclosed	1 September 2023	
FW	(Austria) Ercan Kara	(United States) Orlando City	Undisclosed	2 September 2023	
MF	(France) Flavien Tait	(France) Rennes	Free	6 September 2023	
DF	(Belgium) Mickaël Tirpan	(Turkey) Kasımpaşa	Free	15 September 2023	

=== Out ===
Pos.	Player	Transferred to	Fee	Date	Source
MF	(Turkey) Cihan Kahraman	(Portugal) Académico de Viseu	€500,000	1 September 2023	
MF	(England) Kadeem Harris	(Turkey) Bandırmaspor	Free	12 September 2023	
DF	(Belgium) Mickaël Tirpan	(Belgium) Lierse Kempenzonen	Free	24 January 2024	

== Pre-season and friendlies ==
Win Draw Loss

11 July 2023 Friendly	Çaykur Rizespor (Turkey)	0–1	(Turkey) Samsunspor	Erzurum
16:30 UTC+3			Fofana 27'	Stadium: Yüksek İrtifa Kamp Ve Merkezi 3 Nolu Saha

13 July 2023 Friendly	Konyaspor (Turkey)	3–2	(Turkey) Samsunspor	Erzurum
17:00 UTC+3	Michalak 13'; Šatka 31' (o.g.); Moreno 56'		Sağat 11'; Mouandilmadji 90' (pen.)	Stadium: Yüksek İrtifa Kamp Ve Merkezi 3 Nolu Saha

25 July 2023 Friendly	Samsunspor (Turkey)	3–1	(Turkey) Eyüpspor	Turkey
17:00 UTC+3	Yavru 62'; Mouandilmadji 67', 71'		Niyaz 49'

10 September 2023 Friendly	Samsunspor (Turkey)	6–1	(Turkey) Giresunspor
16:30 UTC+3

26 March 2024 Friendly	Samsunspor (Turkey)	6–1	(Turkey) Çorum
16:00 UTC+3

== Competitions ==
=== Overall record ===
Competition	First match	Last match	Starting round	Final position	Record							
Competition	First match	Last match	Starting round	Final position	Pld	W	D	L	GF	GA	GD	Win %
Süper Lig	12 August 2023	25 May 2024	Matchday 1	13th	38	11	10	17	42	52	−10	28.95
Turkish Cup	5 December 2023	6 February 2024	Fourth round	Round of 16	3	2	0	1	7	3	+4	66.67
Total					41	13	10	18	49	55	−6	31.71

Source: Soccerway

=== Süper Lig ===
==== League table ====
Pos	Team	Pld	W	D	L	GF	GA	GD	Pts
11	Gaziantep	38	12	8	18	50	57	−7	44 (Note: Gaziantep are ahead of Adana Demirspor on head-to-head points: Gaziantep 2–2 Adana Demirspor, Adana Demirspor 1–6 Gaziantep.)
12	Adana Demirspor	38	10	14	14	54	61	−7	44
13	Samsunspor	38	11	10	17	42	52	−10	43
14	Kayserispor (Note: 3 points deducted)	38	11	12	15	44	57	−13	42
15	Hatayspor	38	9	14	15	45	52	−7	41 (Note: Hatayspor are ahead of Konyaspor on overall goal difference.)

Source: Süper Lig
Rules for classification: 1) Points; 2) Head-to-head points; 3) Head-to-head goal difference; 4) Head-to-head goals scored; 5) Goal difference; 6) Goals scored; 7) Play-off.

==== Results summary ====
Overall								Home						Away					
Pld	W	D	L	GF	GA	GD	Pts	W	D	L	GF	GA	GD	W	D	L	GF	GA	GD
38	11	10	17	42	52	−10	43	10	5	4	28	17	+11	1	5	13	14	35	−21

Source: Trendyol Süper Lig

==== Results by round ====
Round	1	2	3	4	5	6	7	8	9	10	11	12	13	14	15	16	17	18	19	20	21	22	23	24	25	26	27
Ground	A	H	A	H	A	A	H	A	H	A	H	A	H	A	H	A	H	A	H	H	A	H	A	H	H	A	H
Result	D	L	L	W	L	L	L	L	D	L	W	L	L	W	W	L	D	L	W	W	D	W	D	L	W	D	W
Position	11	17	18	14	15	16	17	18	19	20	19	19	19	18	17	17	17	18	17	15	15	14	14	15	13	12	

Source: Trendyol Süper Lig
A = Away; H = Home; W = Win; D = Draw; L = Loss

==== Matches ====
The league fixtures were unveiled on 19 July 2023.

13 August 2023 1	Sivasspor	1–1	Samsunspor	Sivas
19:15 UTC+3	N'Jie 11'	Report	Van Drongelen 78'	Stadium: 4 Eylül Stadium; Attendance: 6,311; Referee: Murat Erdoğan

21 August 2023 2	Samsunspor	0–2	Fenerbahçe	Samsun
21:00 UTC+3		Report	Džeko 62'; Szymański 90+8'	Stadium: Samsun Stadium; Attendance: 29,781; Referee: Volkan Bayarslan

27 August 2023 3	Kayserispor	2–1	Samsunspor	Kayseri
19:15 UTC+3	Uzodimma 16'; Thiam 38'	Report	Mouandilmadji 62'	Stadium: Kadir Has Stadium; Attendance: 7,166; Referee: Bahattin Şimşek

16 September 2023 5	Galatasaray	4–2	Samsunspor	Istanbul
20:00 UTC+3	Aktürkoğlu 7', 29'; Bardakcı 42'; Icardi 67'	Report	Dimata 46'; Holse 60'	Stadium: Ali Sami Yen Stadium; Attendance: 43,103; Referee: Cihan Aydın

23 September 2023 6	Antalyaspor	2–0	Samsunspor	Antalya
20:00	Jehezkel 10', 18', (yellow card) 45+3'; Balcı (yellow card) 15'		Dimata (yellow card) 90+2'	Stadium: Antalya Stadium; Referee: Arda Kardeşler

29 September 2023 7	Samsunspor	1–2	Gaziantep	Samsun
20:00				Stadium: Samsun Stadium

8 October 2023 8	Çaykur Rizespor	1–0	Samsunspor	Rize
13:30				Stadium: City of Rize Stadium

22 October 2023 9	Samsunspor	0–0	Istanbul Basaksehir	Samsun
20:00				Stadium: Samsun Stadium

29 October 2023 10	Ankaragücü	1–2	Samsunspor	Ankara
19:00				Stadium: Eryaman Stadium

4 November 2023 11	Samsunspor	2–1	Hatayspor	Samsun
16:00				Stadium: Samsun Stadium; Referee: Halil Umut Meler

8 November 2023 4	Samsunspor	2–1	İstanbulspor	Samsun
20:00				Stadium: Samsun Stadium; Referee: Burak Şeker

12 November 2023 12	Pendikspor	1–0	Samsunspor	Istanbul
13:30 TRT (UTC+3)	Yardımcı 47'			Stadium: Siltaş Yapı Pendik Stadyumu; Referee: Burak Pakkan

26 November 2023 13	Samsunspor	1–2	Beşiktaş	Samsun
16:00 TRT (UTC+3)	Mouandilmadji 25'		Tosun (penalty missed) 16', 17'; Colley 84'	Stadium: Samsun Stadium; Referee: Abdulkadir Bitigen

25 January 2024 22	Samsunspor	2–0	Kayserispor	Samsun
17:00 TRT (UTC+3)	Yavru 10'; Kara 57'			Stadium: Samsun Stadium; Referee: Çağdaş Altay

29 January 2024 23	İstanbulspor	1–1	Samsunspor	Istanbul
17:00 TRT (UTC+3)	Gültekin 54'		Kılınç 72'	Stadium: Esenyurt Necmi Kadıoğlu Stadium; Referee: Ömer Turtay

2 February 2024 24	Samsunspor	0–2	Galatasaray	Samsun
20:00 TRT (UTC+3)			Nelsson 5'; Yılmaz 11'	Stadium: Samsun Stadium; Referee: Tugay Kaan Numanoğlu

12 February 2024 25	Samsunspor	2–0	Antalyaspor	Samsun
20:00 TRT (UTC+3)	Mouandilmadji 59'; Ntcham (yellow card) 64'; Çelik (yellow card) 78'; Muja 90+1'		Naldo (yellow card) 14'; Van de Streek (yellow card) 86'	Stadium: Samsun Stadium; Referee: Atilla Karaoğlan

18 February 2024 26	Gaziantep	1–1	Samsunspor	Gaziantep
16:00 TRT (UTC+3)	Özçiçek 83'; Djilobodji (red card) 90+8'		Šatka 90+2'	Stadium: Gaziantep Stadium; Referee: Zorbay Küçük

23 February 2024 27	Samsunspor	3–0	Çaykur Rizespor	Samsun
20:00 TRT (UTC+3)	Van Drongelen 12'; Raman (yellow card) 37'; Yavru (yellow card) 39'; Holse 54'; Ntcham 78' (pen.)		Sauer (yellow card) 88'	Stadium: Samsun Stadium

=== Turkish Cup ===
5 December 2023 Fourth round	Samsunspor	3–0	Tokat Belediye	Samsun
19:00				Stadium: Samsun 19 Mayıs Stadium
