= Rick van Drongelen =

Dutch footballer (born 1998)

- Van Drongelen in 2026 with Panathinaikos

Personal information
- Full name: Rick van Drongelen
- Date of birth: 20 December 1998 (age 27)
- Place of birth: Terneuzen, Netherlands
- Height: 1.87 m (6 ft 2 in)
- Position: Centre-back

Team information
- Current team: Panathinaikos
- Number: 55

Youth career
- 2009–2013: JVOZ
- 2013–2015: Sparta Rotterdam

Senior career*
Years	Team	Apps	(Gls)
2015–2017	Sparta Rotterdam	46	(1)
2017–2021	Hamburger SV	88	(3)
2021–2023	Union Berlin	0	(0)
2022	→ Mechelen (loan)	10	(0)
2022–2023	→ Hansa Rostock (loan)	23	(1)
2023–2026	Samsunspor	95	(8)
2026–	Panathinaikos	10	(0)

International career
2015	Netherlands U17	9	(0)
2015	Netherlands U18	2	(0)
2015–2017	Netherlands U19	13	(0)
2017–2019	Netherlands U21	18	(2)
- * Club domestic league appearances and goals as of 8 November 2026

Rick van Drongelen (born 20 December 1998) is a Dutch professional footballer who plays as a centre-back for Super League Greece club Panathinaikos.

== Club career ==
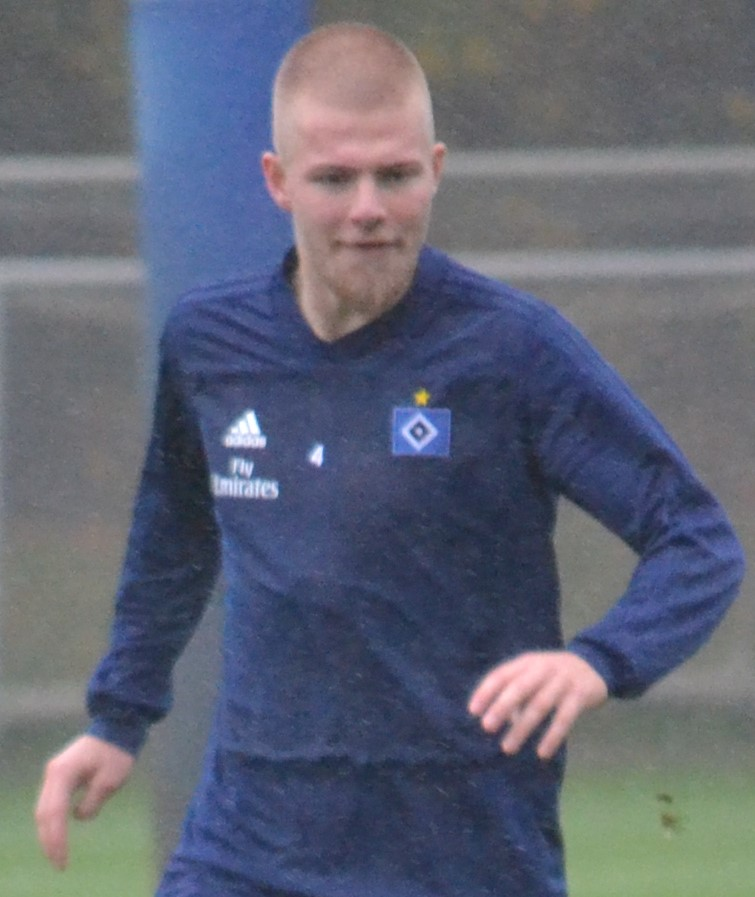
Van Drongelen with Hamburger SV in 2018

Van Drongelen is a youth exponent from Sparta Rotterdam. He made his team debut on 4 December 2015 against FC Volendam replacing Thomas Verhaar in extra time.

On 3 August 2017, Van Drongelen joined Bundesliga club Hamburger SV on a five-year deal. The transfer fee paid to Sparta Rotterdam was reported as €3 million.

On 15 June 2021, Van Drongelen signed with Union Berlin. On 31 January 2022, Van Drongelen was loaned to Mechelen until the end of the season. He made his debut for Mechelen on 6 February 2022, as an 87th-minute substitute in a 3–2 win over Beerschot.

On the morning of 4 May 2022, van Drongelen was involved in a car accident where his vehicle collided with another - the driver of the other vehicle, an 18-year old, died in the collision, whilst van Drongelen was hospitalised and released a day later.

On 11 July 2023, van Drongelen signed a three-year contract with Samsunspor in Turkey.

On 19 July 2026, he was signed by Greek side Panathinaikos for a fee of 4,8m euros and a 4-year contract expiring in 2030.

== International career ==
Van Drongelen played 18 games for the Netherlands national under-21 football team.

== Career statistics ==
As of match played 8 November 2026

Appearances and goals by club, season and competition
Club	Season	League			National cup (Note: Includes KNVB Cup, DFB-Pokal, Turkish Cup, Greek Football Cup)		Europe		Total	
Club	Season	Division	Apps	Goals	Apps	Goals	Apps	Goals	Apps	Goals
Sparta Rotterdam	2015–16	Eerste Divisie	15	1	0	0	—		15	1
Sparta Rotterdam	2016–17	Eredivisie	31	0	4	0	—		35	0
Sparta Rotterdam	Total		46	1	4	0	—		50	1
Hamburger SV	2017–18	Bundesliga	18	0	0	0	—		18	0
Hamburger SV	2018–19	2. Bundesliga	34	2	5	0	—		39	2
Hamburger SV	2019–20	2. Bundesliga	32	1	2	0	—		34	1
Hamburger SV	2020–21	2. Bundesliga	4	0	0	0	—		4	0
Hamburger SV	Total		88	3	7	0	—		95	3
1. FC Union Berlin	2021–22	Bundesliga	0	0	0	0	0	0	0	0
1. FC Union Berlin	2022–23	Bundesliga	0	0	0	0	0	0	0	0
1. FC Union Berlin	Total		0	0	0	0	0	0	0	0
Mechelen (loan)	2021–22	Belgian Pro League	10	0	0	0	—		10	0
Hansa Rostock (loan)	2022–23	2. Bundesliga	23	1	0	0	—		22	1
Samsunspor	2023–24	Süper Lig	30	3	2	0	—		32	3
Samsunspor	2024–25	Süper Lig	33	3	0	0	—		33	3
Samsunspor	2025–26	Süper Lig	30	2	2	0	12 (Note: Two appearances in UEFA Europa League, ten appearances in UEFA Conference League)	0	47	3
Samsunspor	Total		93	8	4	0	12	0	109	8
Panathinaikos	2026–27	Super League Greece	10	0	2	0	7 (Note: All appearances in UEFA Conference League)	0	19	0
Career total			267	12	18	0	19	0	304	12

== Honours ==
Sparta Rotterdam

- Eerste Divisie: 2015–16
