= Landry Dimata =

Belgian footballer (born 1997)

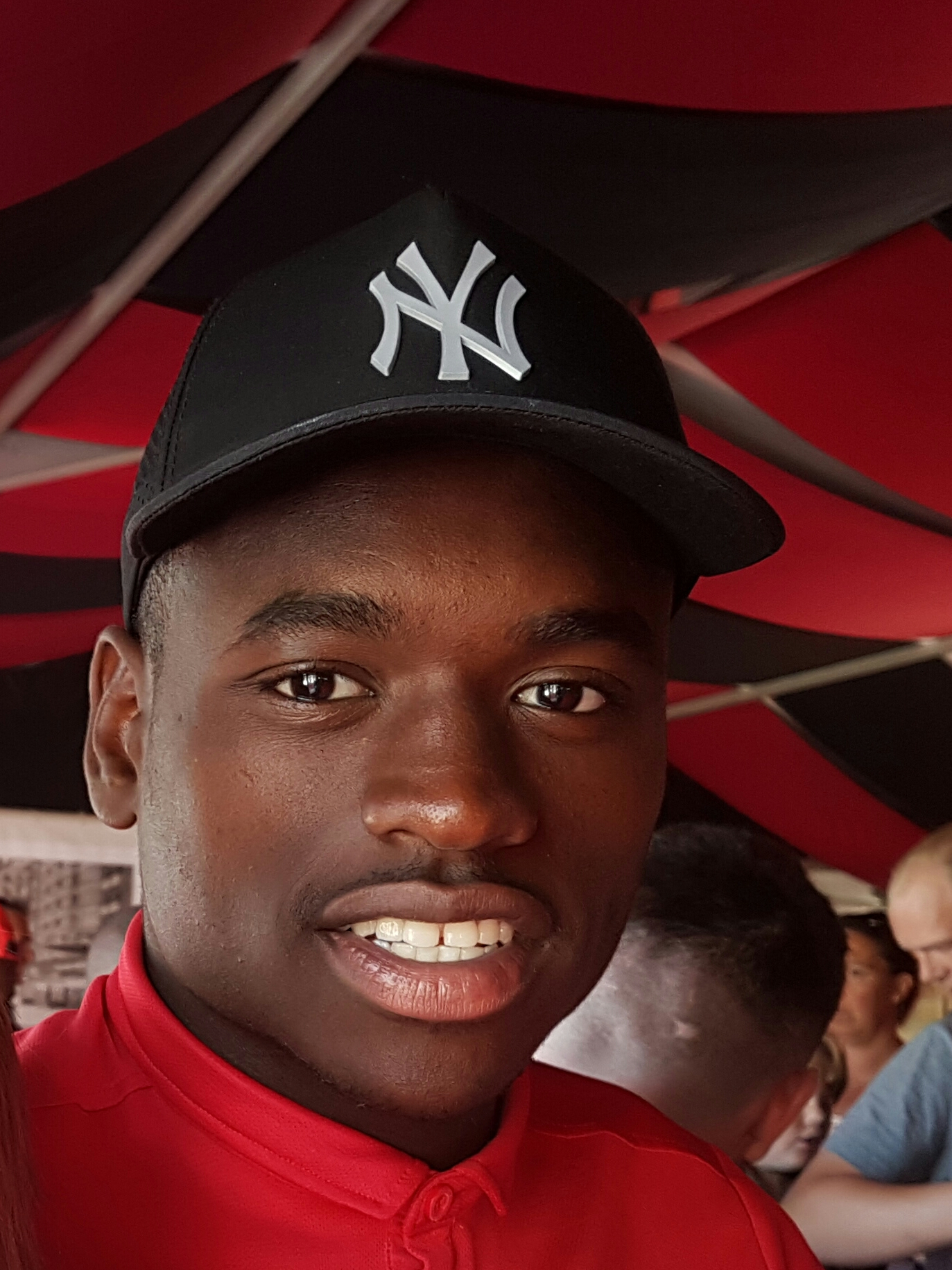
- Dimata in 2016

Personal information
- Full name: Landry Nany Dimata
- Date of birth: 1 September 1997 (age 29)
- Place of birth: Mbuji-Mayi, DR Congo
- Height: 1.85 m (6 ft 1 in)
- Position: Forward

Team information
- Current team: Chongqing Tonglianglong (on loan from Pafos)
- Number: 11

Youth career
- –2016: Standard Liège

Senior career*
Years	Team	Apps	(Gls)
2016–2017	Oostende	29	(12)
2017–2019	VfL Wolfsburg	21	(0)
2018–2019	→ Anderlecht (loan)	20	(13)
2019–2021	Anderlecht	13	(2)
2021	→ Espanyol (loan)	19	(5)
2021–2023	Espanyol	19	(0)
2022–2023	→ NEC (loan)	30	(10)
2023–2025	Samsunspor	51	(9)
2025–	Pafos	15	(1)
2026–	→ Chongqing Tonglianglong (loan)	27	(8)

International career^{‡}
2013–2014	Belgium U17	4	(1)
2014–2015	Belgium U18	4	(2)
2014–2016	Belgium U19	13	(9)
2016–2019	Belgium U21	12	(7)
- * Club domestic league appearances and goals as of 14 November 2026 ‡ National team caps and goals as of 18 October 2018

Landry Nany Dimata (born 1 September 1997) is a professional footballer who plays as a forward for Chinese Super League club Chongqing Tonglianglong, on loan from Pafos. Born in the DR Congo, he is a youth international for Belgium.

== Club career ==
Dimata played with Standard Liège as a junior. He joined Oostende in 2016. He made his Belgian Pro League debut on 4 August 2016 against Genk. In July 2017, Dimata joined VfL Wolfsburg for a fee of €10 million.

In July 2018, Dimata moved to Belgium club Anderlecht, on a loan deal until the end of the season with an option to buy. In November 2018, Anderlecht exercised the purchase option on Dimata.

On 1 February 2021, Dimata moved to Spanish side Espanyol, on a loan deal until the end of the season. The deal included a purchase option. On 2 June 2021, he joined Espanyol permanently.

On 30 August 2022, Dimata moved on loan to NEC in the Netherlands for what ultimately was a poor period for the striker. On 1 September 2023, he was transferred to Turkish Süper Lig side Samsunspor.

On 2 September 2025, Dimata signed for Cypriot First Division side Pafos. Later that month, on 27 September, he scored his first goal in the stoppage time of a 2–1 win over Olympiakos Nicosia. He recorded a top speed of 39.6 kilometres per hour (24.6 mph) during a 2–2 draw against Monaco on 26 November, making him the fastest player in the Champions League league phase.

On 5 February 2026, Dimata was loaned to Chinese Super League club Chongqing Tonglianglong.

== International career ==
Dimata was born in the Democratic Republic of the Congo and moved to Belgium at a young age, holding dual-citizenship. In September 2020, he was called up to the senior Belgium squad for the UEFA Nations League matches against Denmark and Iceland.

== Career statistics ==
As of match played 8 November 2026

Appearances and goals by club, season and competition
Club	Season	League			National cup (Note: Includes Belgian Cup, DFB-Pokal, Copa del Rey, KNVB Cup, Turkish Cup)		Europe		Other		Total	
Club	Season	Division	Apps	Goals	Apps	Goals	Apps	Goals	Apps	Goals	Apps	Goals
Oostende	2016–17	Belgian First Division A	29	12	5	2	—		—		34	14
VfL Wolfsburg	2017–18	Bundesliga	21	0	1	0	—		—		22	0
Anderlecht (loan)	2018–19	Belgian First Division A	20	13	1	0	3 (Note: Appearances in UEFA Europa League)	0	—		24	13
Anderlecht	2019–20	Belgian First Division A	0	0	0	0	—		—		0	0
Anderlecht	2020–21	Belgian First Division A	10	2	0	0	—		—		10	2
Anderlecht	Anderlecht total		10	2	0	0	—		—		10	2
Espanyol (loan)	2020–21	Segunda División	19	5	0	0	—		—		19	5
Espanyol	2021–22	La Liga	17	2	2	0	—		—		19	2
Espanyol	2023–24	Segunda División	2	0	—		—		—		2	0
Espanyol	Espanyol total		19	2	2	0	—		—		21	2
NEC (loan)	2022–23	Eredivisie	30	10	2	0	—		—		32	10
Samsunspor	2023–24	Süper Lig	19	2	2	0	—		—		21	2
Samsunspor	2024–25	Süper Lig	30	7	2	0	—		—		32	7
Samsunspor	2025–26	Süper Lig	2	0	0	0	2	0	—		4	0
Samsunspor	Total		51	9	4	0	2	0	—		57	9
Pafos	2025–26	Cypriot First Division	14	1	0	0	6 (Note: Appearances in UEFA Champions League)	0	1 (Note: Appearance in Cypriot Super Cup)	0	21	1
Chongqing Tonglianglong (loan)	2026	Chinese Super League	27	8	3	0	—		—		30	8
Career total			240	62	18	2	11	0	1	0	270	64

== Honours ==
Individual

- Belgian Young Professional Footballer of the Year: 2016–17
