= Olivier Ntcham =

Cameroonian-French footballer (born 1996)

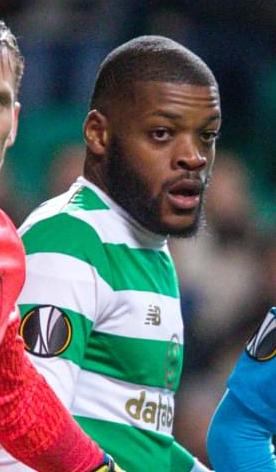
- Ntcham playing for Celtic in 2018

Personal information
- Full name: Jules Olivier Ntcham
- Date of birth: 9 February 1996 (age 30)
- Place of birth: Longjumeau, Essonne, France
- Height: 1.80 m (5 ft 11 in)
- Position: Attacking midfielder

Youth career
- 2004–2005: Chennevières-sur-Marne
- 2005–2008: US Ormesson
- 2008–2009: VGA Saint-Maur
- 2009–2010: Paris FC
- 2010–2012: Le Havre AC
- 2012–2015: Manchester City

Senior career*
Years	Team	Apps	(Gls)
2015–2017	Manchester City	0	(0)
2015–2017	→ Genoa (loan)	37	(3)
2017–2021	Celtic	87	(13)
2021	→ Marseille (loan)	4	(0)
2021–2023	Swansea City	78	(12)
2023–2026	Samsunspor	83	(14)

International career^{‡}
2011–2012	France U16	19	(5)
2012–2013	France U17	8	(0)
2014	France U18	2	(1)
2014	France U19	5	(0)
2015–2016	France U20	2	(0)
2017–2019	France U21	20	(1)
2022–	Cameroon	9	(1)
- * Club domestic league appearances and goals as of 10 June 2026 ‡ National team caps and goals as of 22 November 2023

Jules Olivier Ntcham (born 9 February 1996) is a professional footballer who plays as an attacking midfielder. Born in France, he plays for the Cameroon national team.

Ntcham played for numerous youth clubs in and around Paris before joining youth academies at Paris FC and Le Havre. In 2012, at the age of 16, Ntcham joined Manchester City's Elite Development Squad for £730,000. Developing under City's Football Development Executive Patrick Vieira, Ntcham's potential was noticed by club manager Manuel Pellegrini, who included him on City's pre-season tour of Australia in 2015.

After signing a professional contract with City, Ntcham was loaned out for a two season spell at Genoa in Italy's Serie A, with an option to buy later. In July 2017, Ntcham signed for Scottish Premiership side Celtic on a four-year permanent deal. He signed a contract extension with the Glasgow club in November 2018, extending his stay until 2022. In February 2021, Ntcham was loaned out to French club Marseille. Ntcham joined Swansea City in September 2021.

Internationally, Ntcham has represented France at numerous levels, most recently the France national under-21 football team at the 2019 UEFA European Under-21 Championship.

== Club career ==
=== Manchester City ===
Ntcham was born in Longjumeau, Essonne. He signed for Manchester City in 2012, joining from French club Le Havre for a fee in the region of €1m, after refusing to sign a professional contract at the club. In July 2015, he signed a five-year deal with Manchester City, before joining Italian side Genoa on a two-year loan.

==== Loan to Genoa ====
On 28 August 2015, Serie A side Genoa signed Ntcham on a two-year loan with an option to buy. He made his debut for the club on 23 August 2015, in a 1–0 defeat to Palermo. His second match was marked with a 2–0 win against Hellas Verona.

Ntcham's first goal for Genoa came in the opening game of his second season, during a 3–1 win over Cagliari on 21 August 2016. He scored his second goal on 26 February 2017, in stoppage time, rescuing a 1–1 draw with Bologna.

=== Celtic ===
On 12 July 2017, Ntcham signed a four-year contract with Celtic. He scored his first goal for Celtic in a 1–0 win against Partick Thistle on 11 August 2017. On 9 November 2018, at the age of 22, he signed a new four-year contract to keep him at Celtic until the year 2022.

Ntcham scored the winning goal against Lazio in the Europa League on 7 November 2019, giving Celtic a historic 2–1 victory as their first ever win in Italy.

==== Loan to Marseille ====
On 1 February 2021, Ntcham joined French side Marseille on loan for the remainder of the 2020–21 season. Manager André Villas-Boas, who had informed the Marseille board that he didn't want the player, offered his resignation the following day in response to Ntcham joining and was suspended as manager a few hours later for publicly criticising the club's board. On 10 February 2021, he made his debut for Marseille as a substitute for Valentin Rongier in a 2–0 away win over AJ Auxerre in the Coupe de France. On 10 February 2021, he made his league debut as a substitute for Michaël Cuisance in a 0–0 away draw against Bordeaux.

=== Swansea City ===
On 1 September 2021, Ntcham joined Championship club Swansea City on a free transfer. He scored his first goal for Swansea in a 3–3 draw with Luton Town on 18 September 2021.

=== Samsunspor ===
On 7 August 2023, Ntcham joined Turkish Süper Lig side Samsunspor.

== International career ==
Ntcham was born in France to parents of Cameroonian descent. He was a youth international for France at various levels.

In November 2019, he was placed on standby for Cameroon's Africa Cup of Nations qualifiers against Cape Verde and Rwanda. He debuted with the Cameroon national team in a friendly 2–0 loss to Uzbekistan on 23 September 2022.

On November 10, 2022, he was selected by Rigobert Song to compete in the 2022 FIFA World Cup.

On 28 December 2023, he was selected from the list of 27 Cameroonian players selected to compete in the 2023 Africa Cup of Nations.

== Career statistics ==
As of match played 26 October 2024

Appearances and goals by club, season and competition
Club	Season	League			National cup (Note: Includes Coppa Italia, Scottish Cup, Coupe de France, FA Cup)		League cup (Note: Includes Scottish League Cup, EFL Cup)		Europe		Total	
Club	Season	Division	Apps	Goals	Apps	Goals	Apps	Goals	Apps	Goals	Apps	Goals
Genoa (loan)	2015–16	Serie A	17	0	1	0	—		—		18	0
Genoa (loan)	2016–17	Serie A	20	3	3	0	—		—		23	3
Genoa (loan)	Total		37	3	4	0	—		—		41	3
Celtic	2017–18	Scottish Premiership	30	5	5	3	2	0	11 (Note: Nine appearances and one goal in UEFA Champions League, two appearances in UEFA Europa League)	1	48	9
Celtic	2018–19	Scottish Premiership	20	3	1	0	4	0	12 (Note: Six appearances and one goal in UEFA Champions League, six appearances and two goals in UEFA Europa League)	3	37	6
Celtic	2019–20	Scottish Premiership	23	4	2	1	2	2	11 (Note: Four appearances in UEFA Champions League, seven appearances and one goal in UEFA Europa League)	1	38	8
Celtic	2020–21	Scottish Premiership	14	1	0	0	0	0	9 (Note: Two appearances in UEFA Champions League, seven appearances in UEFA Europa League)	0	23	1
Celtic	Total		87	13	8	4	8	2	43	5	146	24
Marseille (loan)	2020–21	Ligue 1	4	0	2	0	—		—		6	0
Swansea City	2021–22	Championship	37	4	1	0	0	0	—		38	4
Swansea City	2022–23	Championship	41	8	2	0	1	0	—		42	7
Swansea City	Total		78	12	3	0	1	0	—		80	11
Samsunspor	2023–24	Süper Lig	27	6	0	0	–		–		27	6
Samsunspor	2024–25	Süper Lig	10	4	0	0	–		–		10	4
Samsunspor	Total		37	10	0	0	—		—		37	10
Career total			243	37	19	4	9	2	43	5	310	47

== Honours ==
Celtic

- Scottish Premiership: 2017–18, 2018–19, 2019–20
- Scottish Cup: 2017–18, 2018–19
- Scottish League Cup: 2017–18, 2018–19, 2019–20
