= Ľubomír Šatka =

Slovak footballer (born 1995)

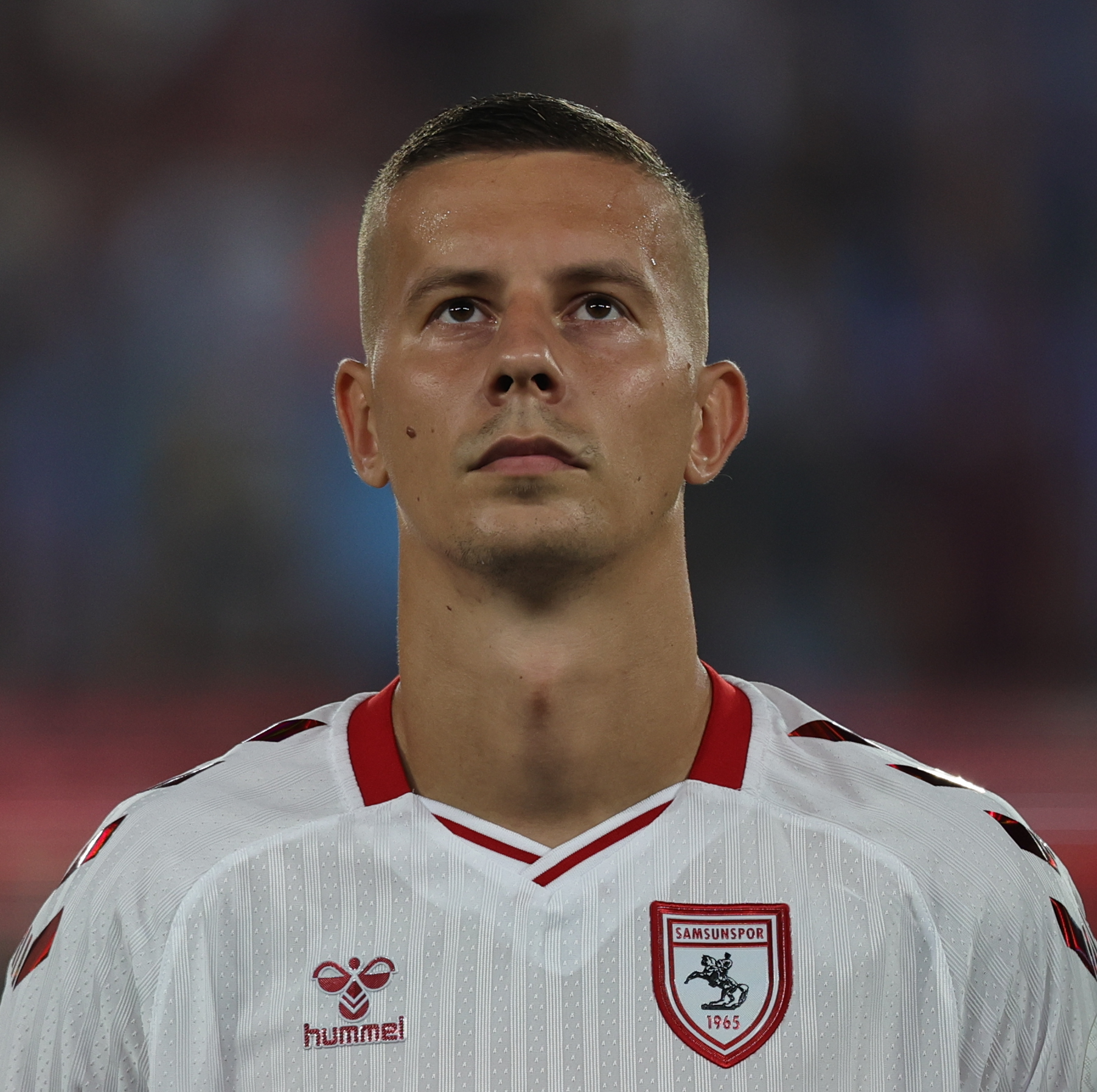
- Šatka in 2025

Personal information
- Full name: Ľubomír Šatka
- Date of birth: 2 December 1995 (age 30)
- Place of birth: Ilava, Slovakia
- Height: 1.88 m (6 ft 2 in)
- Position: Centre-back

Team information
- Current team: Omonia
- Number: 37

Youth career
- –2012: Dubnica
- 2012–2014: Newcastle United

Senior career*
Years	Team	Apps	(Gls)
2014–2017	Newcastle United	0	(0)
2016	→ York City (loan)	6	(0)
2017	→ Dunajská Streda (loan)	10	(0)
2017–2019	Dunajská Streda	59	(3)
2019–2023	Lech Poznań	86	(3)
2023–2026	Samsunspor	84	(1)
2026–	Omonia	5	(2)

International career^{‡}
2011	Slovakia U17	3	(1)
2012–2013	Slovakia U19	8	(0)
2016–2017	Slovakia U21	2	(1)
2018–	Slovakia	44	(1)
- * Club domestic league appearances and goals as of 11:44, 10 October 2026 (UTC) ‡ National team caps and goals as of 18 November 2026

Ľubomír Šatka (Slovak pronunciation: [ˈʎubɔmiːr ˈʂatka]; born 2 December 1995) is a Slovak professional footballer who plays as a centre-back for Omonia and the Slovakia national team.

== Club career ==
=== Early career ===
Šatka was born in Ilava, Trenčín Region. A product of Dubnica, he joined Newcastle United in 2012. In 2014, he was included in the senior squad for a friendly tournament to be held in New Zealand. On 3 January 2015, Šatka made his senior debut in an FA Cup match against Leicester City, which his team lost.

Šatka joined League Two club York City on 29 January 2016 on a one-month youth loan, and debuted on 6 February as a 58th-minute substitute for Matty Dixon in a 2–0 away loss to Northampton Town.

=== Dunajská Streda ===
Šatka returned to Slovakia to join Dunajská Streda on 10 January 2017 on a six-month loan deal. Satka left Newcastle when his contract expired at the end of the 2016–17 season.

Šatka signed a three-year contract with Dunajská Streda on 18 June 2017.

=== Lech Poznań ===
Šatka agreed to sign for Ekstraklasa club Lech Poznań on 29 June 2019 on a four-year contract, only joining the club in mid-July after Dunajská Streda's tie in the 2019–20 UEFA Europa League first qualifying round.

=== Samsunspor ===
After the end of his contract with Lech Poznań, Šatka joined the newcomer of the Turkish Süper Lig Samsunspor in July 2023, signed a three-year contract.

== International career ==
Šatka has been capped by Slovakia at under-17, under-18, under-19 and under-21 levels.

Šatka was listed as an alternate in the senior team for the two qualifying matches against Slovenia and England on 1 September 2017. In March 2018, he was called up to the senior team for the first time for two fixtures at the 2018 King's Cup. Despite being an unused substitute for the 2–1 victory over the United Arab Emirates, he debuted and played the entire final match on 25 March 2018 against Thailand in a 3–2 victory.

== Career statistics ==
=== Club ===
As of match played 20 September 2026

Appearances and goals by club, season and competition
Club	Season	League			National cup (Note: Includes FA Cup, Slovak Cup, Polish Cup)		League cup		Other		Total	
Club	Season	Division	Apps	Goals	Apps	Goals	Apps	Goals	Apps	Goals	Apps	Goals
Newcastle United	2013–14	Premier League	0	0	0	0	0	0	—		0	0
Newcastle United	2014–15	Premier League	0	0	1	0	0	0	—		1	0
Newcastle United	2015–16	Premier League	0	0	0	0	0	0	—		0	0
Newcastle United	2016–17	Championship	0	0	0	0	0	0	—		0	0
Newcastle United	Total		0	0	1	0	0	0	—		1	0
York City (loan)	2015–16	League Two	6	0	—		—		—		6	0
Dunajská Streda (loan)	2016–17	Slovak Super Liga	10	0	1	0	—		—		11	0
Dunajská Streda	2017–18	Slovak Super Liga	30	1	3	0	—		—		33	1
Dunajská Streda	2018–19	Slovak Super Liga	29	2	3	0	—		4 (Note: Appearances in UEFA Europa League)	0	36	2
Dunajská Streda	2019–20	Slovak Super Liga	—		—		—		2	0	2	0
Dunajská Streda	Total		69	3	7	0	—		6	0	82	3
Lech Poznań	2019–20	Ekstraklasa	31	1	4	0	—		—		35	1
Lech Poznań	2020–21	Ekstraklasa	17	0	1	2	—		9	0	27	2
Lech Poznań	2021–22	Ekstraklasa	25	1	3	0	—		—		28	1
Lech Poznań	2022–23	Ekstraklasa	13	1	1	0	—		9 (Note: Two appearances in UEFA Champions League, seven appearances in UEFA Europa Conference League)	0	23	1
Lech Poznań	Total		86	3	9	2	—		18	0	113	5
Lech Poznań II	2019–20	II liga	1	0	—		—		—		1	0
Lech Poznań II	2020–21	II liga	1	0	—		—		—		1	0
Lech Poznań II	2022–23	II liga	1	0	—		—		—		1	0
Lech Poznań II	Total		3	0	—		—		—		3	0
Samsunspor	2023–24	Süper Lig	26	1	0	0	—		—		26	1
Samsunspor	2024–25	Süper Lig	31	0	0	0	—		—		31	0
Samsunspor	2025–26	Süper Lig	27	1	0	0	—		7 (Note: Two appearances in UEFA Europa League, five appearances in UEFA Conference League)	0	34	1
Samsunspor	Total		84	2	0	0	—		7	0	91	2
Omonia	2026–27	Cypriot First Division	4	1	0	0	—		1	0	5	1
Career total			252	9	17	2	0	0	32	0	301	11

=== International ===
As of match played on 16 November 2026.

Appearances and goals by national team and year
National team	Year	Apps	Goals
Slovakia	2018	6	0
Slovakia	2019	3	0
Slovakia	2020	2	0
Slovakia	2021	13	0
Slovakia	2022	7	0
Slovakia	2023	2	1
Slovakia	2024	1	0
Slovakia	2025	6	0
Slovakia	2026	4	0
Total		44	1

Scores and results list Slovakia's goal tally first, score column indicates score after each Šatka goal.

List of international goals scored by Ľubomír Šatka
No.	Date	Venue	Cap	Opponent	Score	Result	Competition
1	19 November 2023	Bilino Polje, Zenica, Bosnia and Herzegovina	33	Bosnia and Herzegovina	2–1	2–1	UEFA Euro 2024 qualification

== Honours ==
Lech Poznań

- Ekstraklasa: 2021–22
