= Douglas Tanque =

Brazilian footballer (born 1993)

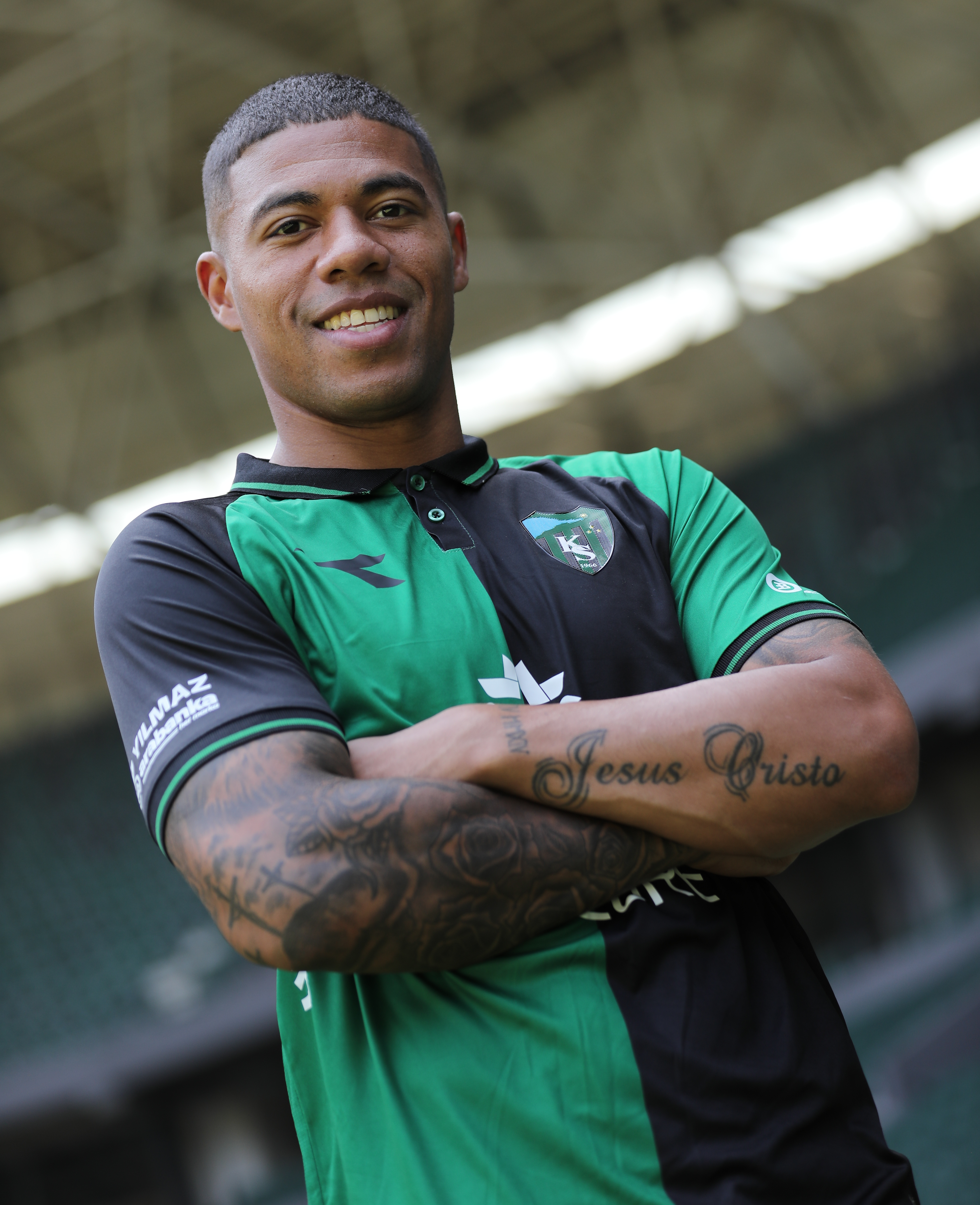
- Tanque in 2023

Personal information
- Full name: Douglas Willian da Silva Souza
- Date of birth: 27 October 1993 (age 33)
- Place of birth: Santa Cruz do Rio Pardo, Brazil
- Height: 1.88 m (6 ft 2 in)
- Position: Striker

Team information
- Current team: Iğdır
- Number: 99

Youth career
- –2011: Guarani
- 2011–2012: Corinthians

Senior career*
Years	Team	Apps	(Gls)
2010	Guarani	3	(0)
2011–2014	Corinthians	0	(0)
2012	→ Paraná (loan)	4	(0)
2012	→ Ipatinga (loan)	2	(0)
2013	→ Guaratinguetá (loan)	30	(11)
2014	→ Penapolense (loan)	11	(5)
2014	→ Ponte Preta (loan)	3	(0)
2015	Thespakusatsu Gunma	4	(1)
2016–2017	Cafetaleros de Tapachula	27	(9)
2017	Albirex Niigata	10	(2)
2018	Police Tero	11	(1)
2018–2021	Paços de Ferreira	89	(30)
2021–2022	Khor Fakkan	15	(3)
2022–2023	Samsunspor	30	(15)
2023–2024	Kocaelispor	19	(10)
2024–2025	Shimizu S-Pulse	31	(5)
2025–2026	Bandırmaspor	28	(12)
2026–	Iğdır	6	(1)
- * Club domestic league appearances and goals as of 18 October 2026

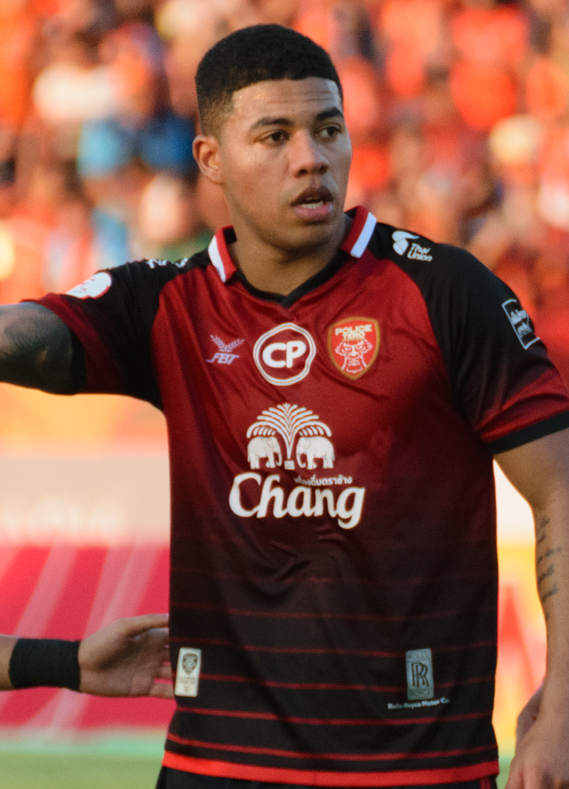
Douglas Tanque in 2018

Douglas Willian da Silva Souza (born 27 October 1993), known as Douglas Tanque or simply Douglas, is a Brazilian footballer who plays as a striker for Turkish TFF 1. Lig club Iğdır.

== Club career ==
=== Guarani ===
Born in Santa Cruz do Rio Pardo, São Paulo, Douglas was a Guarani youth graduate. He made his first team – and Série A – debut on 14 November 2010, starting in a 1–1 home draw against Vitória, and appeared in two further matches as his side was relegated.

=== Corinthians and loans ===
On 4 May 2011, Douglas moved to Corinthians and was assigned to the under-20 squad. On 19 March of the following year, after winning the Copa São Paulo de Futebol Júnior, he moved to Série B side Paraná on loan until the end of the year.

Douglas scored his first professional goal on 18 April 2012, netting the equalizer in a 1–1 home draw against Ceará, which qualified Paraná to the next round of the year's Copa do Brasil. On 1 May, he scored a hat-trick in a 6–1 home routing of Junior Team.

On 18 August 2012, after falling down the pecking order, Douglas left Paraná and joined Ipatinga on loan until December. He subsequently served another loan stints at Guaratinguetá, Penapolense and Ponte Preta before his contract with Corinthians expired.

=== Japan ===
In 2015, Douglas moved abroad and joined Japanese J2 League side Thespakusatsu Gunma. In the following year, he switched teams and countries again after agreeing to a contract with Cafetaleros de Tapachula of the Ascenso MX.

On 22 June 2017, Douglas returned to Japan and joined Albirex Niigata in the J1 League. The following 10 January, the club announced that he would not have his contract renewed, and he subsequently joined Thai League 1 side Police Tero FC on 5 February.

=== Paços de Ferreira ===
On 5 July 2018, Douglas signed for Portuguese LigaPro side F.C. Paços de Ferreira, scoring nine goals during the campaign as his side achieved promotion as champions.

=== Khor Fakkan ===
On 26 September 2021, Douglas signed a two-year contract with Khor Fakka. Over a month after joining, Douglas hit the net for the first time in a 4–1 win over Al Urooba, after the match he said "I'm so happy to have scored my first for Khor Fakkan and may it be the first of many."

=== Turkey ===
On 9 August 2022, Douglas signed a two-year contract with TFF First League (Turkish second division) club Samsunspor.

In August 2023, after helping Samsunspor conquer the TFF First League title, achieving promotion to the Süper Lig, Douglas returned to the second division, signing a two-year contract with recently promoted side Kocaelispor.

=== Return to Japan ===
On 8 February 2024, Douglas returned to Japan, signing with formerly J2 League (now J1 League) club Shimizu S-Pulse.

== Career statistics ==
As of match played 21 October 2023

Club	Season	League			State league		National cup (Note: Includes Copa do Brasil, Copa MX, Taça de Portugal, UAE President's Cup, Turkish Cup)		League cup (Note: Includes Taça da Liga, UAE League Cup)		Continental		Total	
Club	Season	Division	Apps	Goals	Apps	Goals	Apps	Goals	Apps	Goals	Apps	Goals	Apps	Goals
Guarani	2010	Série A	3	0	0	0	0	0	—		—		3	0
Corinthians	2012	Série A	0	0	0	0	—		—		0	0	0	0
Corinthians	2013	Série A	0	0	0	0	0	0	—		0	0	0	0
Corinthians	Total		0	0	0	0	0	0	—		0	0	0	0
Paraná (loan)	2012	Série B	4	0	0	0	3	1	—		—		7	1
Ipatinga (loan)	2012	Série B	2	0	0	0	0	0	—		—		2	0
Guaratinguetá (loan)	2013	Série B	12	3	18 (Note: Appearances in Campeonato Paulista Série A2)	8	—		—		—		30	11
Penapolense (loan)	2014	Série D	0	0	11 (Note: Appearances in Campeonato Paulista)	5	—		—		—		11	5
Ponte Preta (loan)	2014	Série B	3	0	0	0	0	0	—		—		3	0
Thespakusatsu Gunma	2015	J2 League	4	1	—		0	0	—		—		4	1
Cafetaleros de Tapachula	2016–17	Ascenso MX	27	9	—		3	0	—		—		30	9
Albirex Niigata	2017	J1 League	10	2	—		0	0	0	0	—		10	2
Police Tero	2018	Thai League 1	11	1	—		0	0	0	0	—		11	1
Paços de Ferreira	2018–19	LigaPro	24	9	—		4	5	4	0	—		32	14
Paços de Ferreira	2019–20	Primeira Liga	29	11	—		3	0	3	1	—		35	12
Paços de Ferreira	2020–21	Primeira Liga	31	9	—		2	2	1	0	—		34	11
Paços de Ferreira	2021–22	Primeira Liga	5	1	—		0	0	1	0	3 (Note: Appearances in UEFA Europa Conference League)	0	9	1
Paços de Ferreira	Total		89	30	—		9	7	9	1	3	0	110	38
Khor Fakkan	2021–22	UAE Pro League	15	3	—		1	0	4	2	—		20	5
Samsunspor	2022–23	TFF First League	29	15	—		2	2	—		—		31	17
Samsunspor	2023–24	Süper Lig	1	0	—		0	0	—		—		1	0
Samsunspor	Total		30	15	—		2	2	—		—		32	17
Kocaelispor	2023–24	TFF First League	8	4	—		0	0	—		—		8	4
Career total			218	68	29	13	18	10	13	3	3	0	281	94

== Honours ==
Corinthians

- Copa São Paulo de Futebol Júnior: 2012

Paraná

- Campeonato Paranaense Série Prata: 2012

Paços de Ferreira

- LigaPro: 2018–19

Samsunspor

- TFF First League: 2022–23

Individual

- Primeira Liga Forward of the Month: June 2020
