= Marius Mouandilmadji =

Chadian footballer (born 1998)

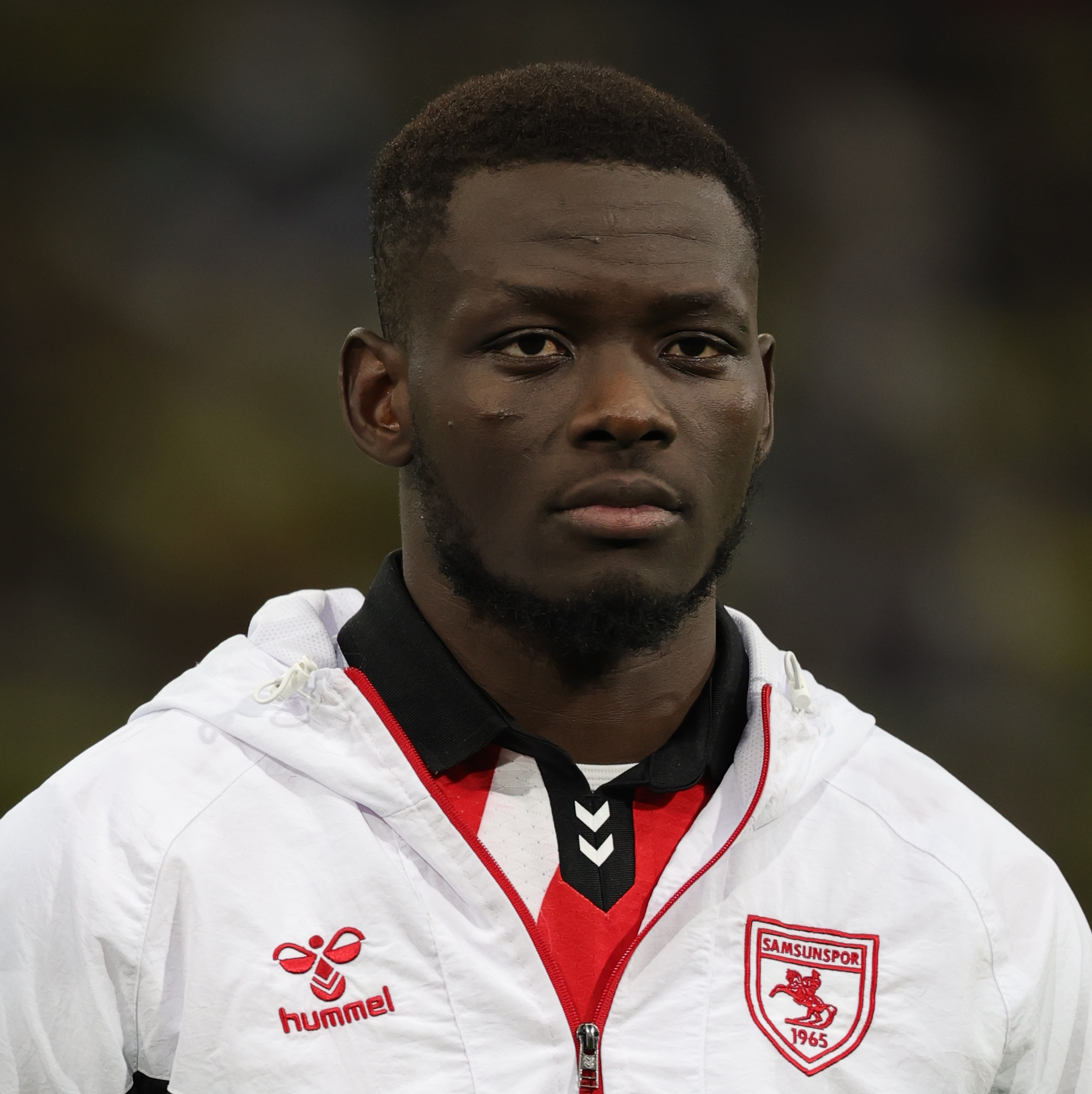
- Mouandilmadji in 2026

Personal information
- Full name: Marius Mouandilmadji
- Date of birth: 22 January 1998 (age 28)
- Place of birth: Doba, Chad
- Height: 1.90 m (6 ft 3 in)
- Position: Striker

Team information
- Current team: Olympiacos
- Number: 99

Youth career
- 2013–2014: CF Doba

Senior career*
Years	Team	Apps	(Gls)
2014–2015	AS Doyen		
2016–2017	Gazelle		
2018	Coton Sport	24	(18)
2018–2021	Porto B	23	(6)
2018–2021	Porto	1	(1)
2020	→ Desportivo Aves (loan)	12	(0)
2021–2023	Seraing	59	(13)
2023–2026	Samsunspor	100	(30)
2026–	Olympiacos	7	(3)

International career^{‡}
2019–	Chad	27	(4)
- * Club domestic league appearances and goals as of 22 November 2026 (UTC) ‡ National team caps and goals as of 31 March 2026 (UTC)

Marius Mouandilmadji (Arabic: ماريوس موانديلمادجي; born 22 January 1998), sometimes known as just Marius, is a Chadian professional footballer who plays as a forward for Super League Greece club Olympiacos and the Chad national team.

== Club career ==
=== Porto ===
On 17 July 2018, Mouandilmadji signed a four-year contract with Porto. Despite initial media reports stating that the youngster would play for the reserve side, manager Sérgio Conceição integrated him with the pre-season main squad.

Mouandilmadji made his professional debut for the Primeira Liga title holders on 11 August as an 81st-minute substitute for fellow Coton Sport graduate Vincent Aboubakar, and scored the final goal of a 5–0 home win over Chaves. He then dropped down to the second team in LigaPro, and scored both of their goals of a 2–1 win over Cova da Piedade on 11 November.

On 9 January 2020, Mouandilmadji was loaned to last-placed Aves for the rest of the top-flight season. After their relegation, he was named in Porto's first-team squad for 2020–21. He rescinded his contract by mutual consent in January 2021, with 18 months remaining.

=== Seraing ===
After being a free agent for six months, Mouandilmadji signed a two-year contract with Belgian Pro League club Seraing in July 2021.

=== Samsunspor ===
On 7 July 2023, recently-promoted Süper Lig side Samsunspor announced the signing of Mouandilmadji on a three-year contract.

=== Olympiacos ===
On 16 September 2026, Mouandilmadji signed for Super League Greece club Olympiacos.

== International career ==
In August 2019, Mouandilmadji was called up for the first time to the Chad national team, for a 2022 FIFA World Cup qualifier against neighbours Sudan. He started the match, a 3–1 home loss on 5 September. On 29 March 2022, Mouandilmadji scored his first goal for Chad, in a 2–2 draw with Gambia in the second leg of the preliminary round of qualification for the 2023 Africa Cup of Nations.

== Career statistics ==
=== Club ===
As of match played 16 May 2026

Appearances and goals by club, season and competition
Club	Season	League			National cup (Note: Includes Belgian Cup, Turkish Cup)		Europe		Other		Total	
Club	Season	Division	Apps	Goals	Apps	Goals	Apps	Goals	Apps	Goals	Apps	Goals
Porto	2018–19	Primeira Liga	1	1	—		—		—		1	1
Porto B	2018–19	Liga Portugal 2	18	5	—		—		—		18	5
Porto B	2019–20	Liga Portugal 2	5	1	—		—		—		5	1
Porto B	Total		23	6	—		—		—		23	6
Aves (loan)	2019–20	Primeira Liga	12	0	0	0	—		—		12	0
Seraing	2021–22	Belgian Pro League	33	2	1	1	—		—		34	3
Seraing	2022–23	Belgian Pro League	26	11	0	0	—		—		26	11
Seraing	Total		59	13	1	1	—		—		60	14
Samsunspor	2023–24	Süper Lig	30	9	1	1	—		—		31	10
Samsunspor	2024–25	Süper Lig	34	10	0	0	—		—		34	10
Samsunspor	2025–26	Süper Lig	34	10	5	5	12 (Note: Two appearances in UEFA Europa League, eight appearances and seven goals in UEFA Conference League)	8	1 (Note: Appearance in Turkish Super Cup)	0	52	23
Samsunspor	Total		98	29	5	6	12	8	1	0	107	38
Career total			193	49	7	7	12	8	1	0	213	64

=== International ===
As of match played 31 March 2026

Appearances and goals by national team and year
National team	Year	Apps	Goals
Chad
Chad	2019	4	0
Chad	2020	3	0
Chad	2021	0	0
Chad	2022	2	1
Chad	2023	2	1
Chad	2024	10	0
Chad	2025	4	2
Chad	2026	2	0
Total		27	4

Scores and results list Chad goal tally first, score column indicates score after each Mouandilmadji goal.

List of international goals scored by Marius Mouandilmadji
No.	Date	Venue	Opponent	Score	Result	Competition
1	29 March 2022	Stade Adrar, Agadir, Morocco	Gambia	2–1	2–2	2023 Africa Cup of Nations qualification
2	17 November 2023	Stade du 26 Mars, Bamako, Mali	Mali	1–1	1–3	2026 FIFA World Cup qualification
3	12 October 2025	Stade Olympique Maréchal Idriss Déby Itno, N'Djamena, Chad	Central African Republic	2–2	2–3	2026 FIFA World Cup qualification
4	17 November 2025	Stade Municipal De Berrechid, Berrechid, Morocco	Mozambique	1–0	2–2	Friendly

== Honours ==
Coton Sport

- Cameroon Premiere Division: 2018

Individual

- LFPC Youngster of the Month: March 2018
- LFPC Player of the Month: April 2018
- UEFA Conference League Team of the Season: 2025–26
