= Yıldırım Holding =

Turkish holding company

YILDIRIM Group Of Companies
- Website: www.yildirimgroup.com

Yıldırım Holding is a family owned conglomerate headquartered in Turkey with companies in mining and shipping. It owns Yılyak, one of Turkey's largest coal importers and is on the global coal exit list published by Urgewald partly due to its interest in coal in Colombia.

Yüksel Yıldırım owns Samsunspor football club.
