= Celil Yüksel =

Turkish association football player

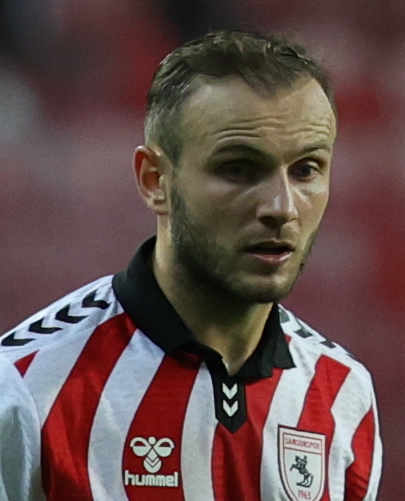

Personal information
- Date of birth: 1 January 1998 (age 28)
- Place of birth: Havza, Turkey
- Height: 1.65 m (5 ft 5 in)
- Position: Midfielder

Team information
- Current team: Samsunspor
- Number: 5

Youth career
- 2007–2010: Ayazağaspor
- 2010–2011: Sarıyer
- 2011–2012: Ayazağaspor
- 2012–2018: Galatasaray

Senior career*
Years	Team	Apps	(Gls)
2018–2020	Galatasaray	2	(0)
2020	→ Adanaspor (loan)	10	(1)
2020–2022	Adanaspor	65	(7)
2022–	Samsunspor	70	(1)
2023–2024	→ Göztepe (loan)	27	(1)

International career^{‡}
2016	Turkey U16	4	(0)
2014–2015	Turkey U17	8	(0)
2015	Turkey U18	3	(0)
- * Club domestic league appearances and goals as of 17 August 2026 ‡ National team caps and goals as of 11 November 2018

Celil Yüksel (born 1 January 1998) is a Turkish professional footballer who plays as a midfielder for Samsunspor.

== Professional career ==
Yüksel signed his first professional contract with Galatasaray on 11 October 2017. He made his professional debut with Galatasaray in a 3-0 Süper Lig win over Kayserispor on 10 November 2018.

On 13 November 2025, Yüksel was banned from playing for 45 days for his involvement in the 2025 Turkish football betting scandal.

== Honours ==
Galatasaray

- Süper Lig: 2018–19
- Turkish Cup: 2018–19
