= Bedirhan Çetin =

Turkish footballer (born 2006)

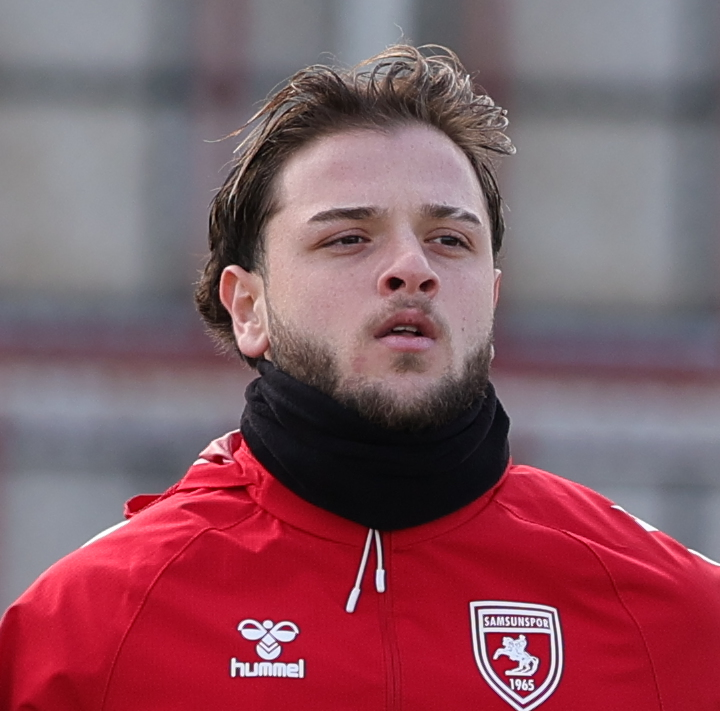

Personal information
- Date of birth: 29 June 2006 (age 20)
- Place of birth: Samsun, Turkey
- Height: 1.82 m (6 ft 0 in)
- Position: Centre-back

Team information
- Current team: Samsunspor
- Number: 96

Youth career
- 2015–2019: Yenidoğanspor
- 2019–2020: Samsun GSIK
- 2020–2022: Samsunspor

Senior career*
| Years | Team | Apps | (Gls) |
| 2022– | Samsunspor | 5 | (0) |

International career^{‡}
| 2021–2022 | Turkey U16 | 12 | (0) |
| 2022–2023 | Turkey U17 | 9 | (0) |
| 2023–2024 | Turkey U18 | 11 | (0) |
| 2024– | Turkey U19 | 6 | (0) |
| 2024– | Turkey U20 | 1 | (0) |
- * Club domestic league appearances and goals as of 13:29, 13 May 2025 (UTC) ‡ National team caps and goals as of 13:29, 13 May 2025 (UTC)

Bedirhan Çetin (born 29 June 2006) is a Turkish professional footballer who plays as a centre-back for Samsunspor.

== Club career ==
Çetin is a youth product of Yenidoğanspor, Samsun GSIK, and Samsunspor. He made his senior and professional debut with Samsunspor in a 4–2 TFF First League win over Tuzlaspor on 20 May 2022. He was part of the squad that won the 2022–23 TFF First League, earning promotion to the Süper Lig. In May 2023, he signed his first professional contract with the club.

== International career ==
Çetin is a youth product of Turkey, having played up to the Turkey U20s in November 2024.

== Honours ==
Samsunspor

- TFF First League: 2022–23
