= Samsun 19 May Stadium =

Football stadium in Tekkeköy, Turkey

- Samsun 19 Mayıs Stadyumu
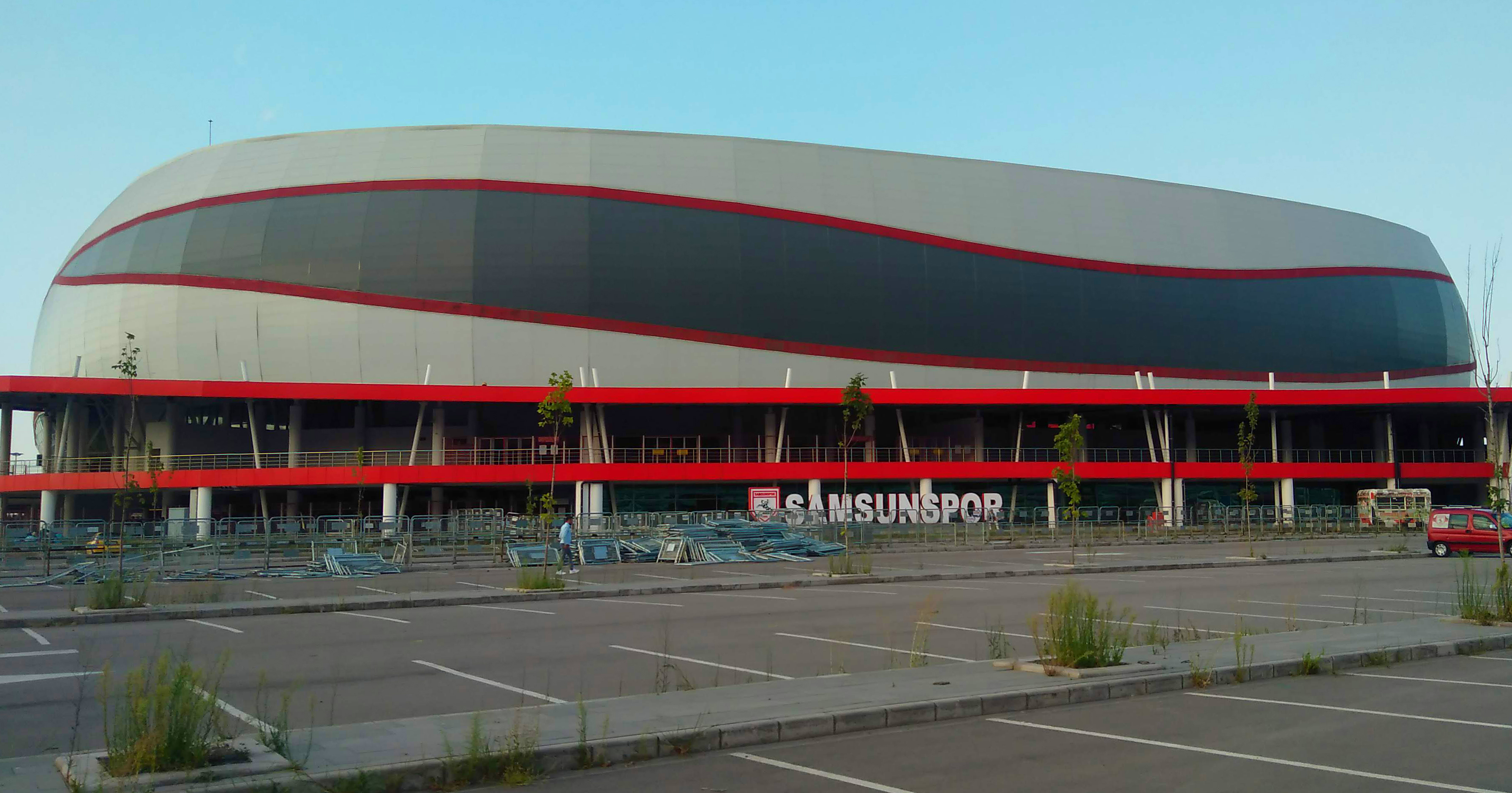
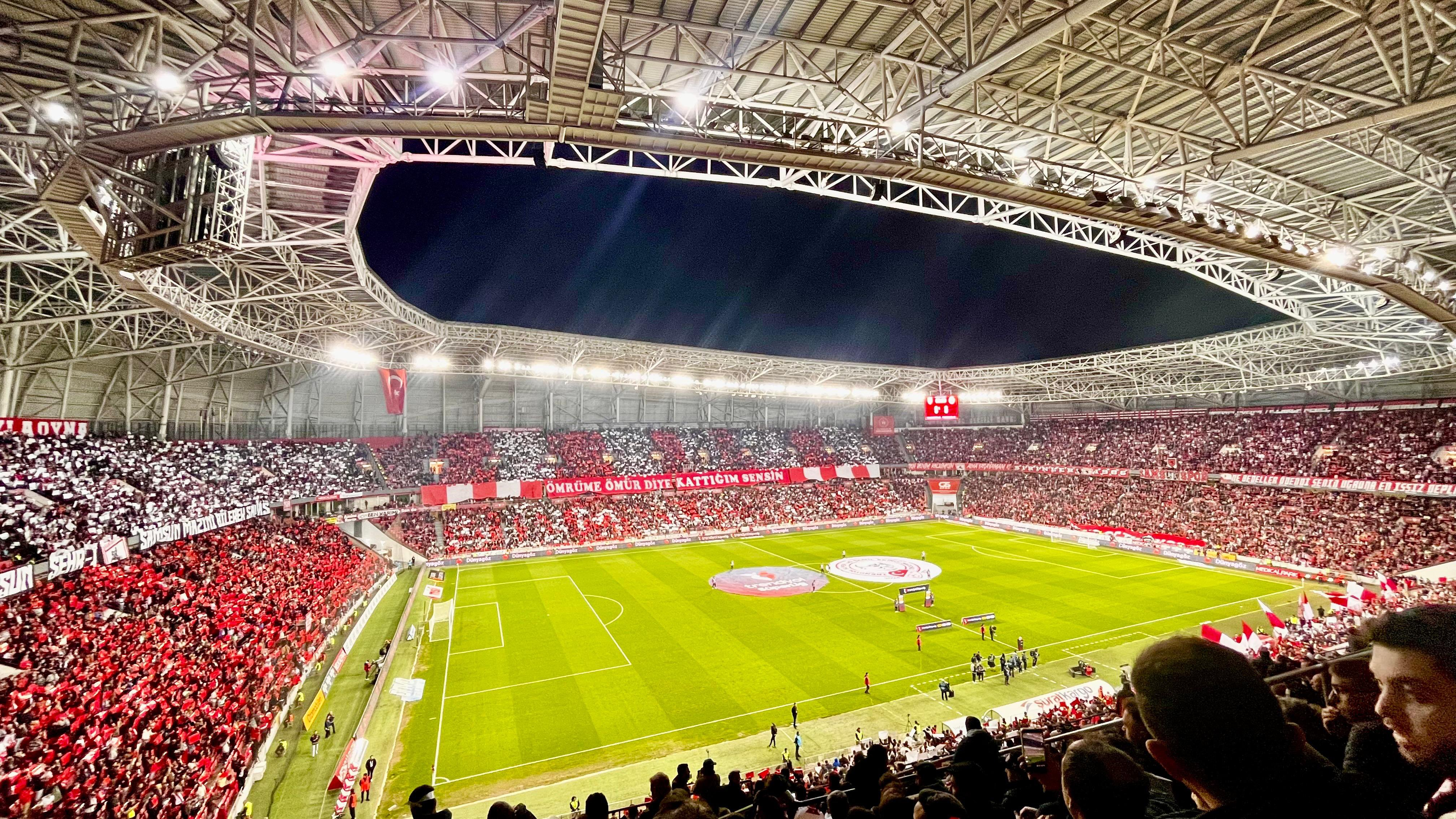

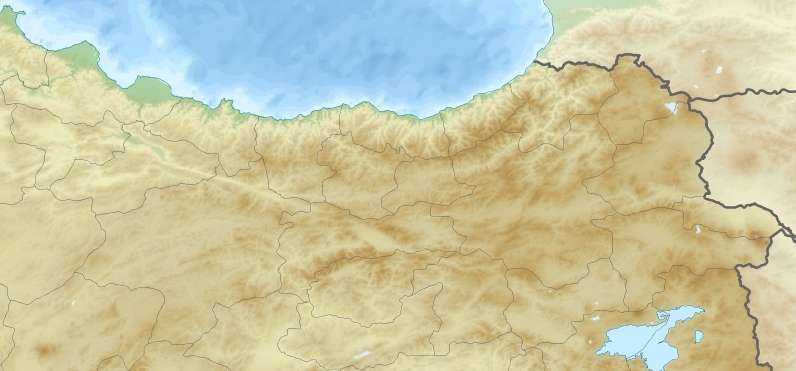
- Location in Northeastern Turkey Location in Turkey
- Location: Tekkeköy, Samsun, Turkey
- Coordinates: 41°13′40″N 36°27′27″E
- Operator: Samsunspor
- Capacity: 34,403
- Executive suites: 54
- Record attendance: 33,021 (Samsunspor-Fenerbahçe, 20 October 2024)

Construction
- Groundbreaking: 4 August 2013
- Opened: 29 July 2017

Tenants
- Samsunspor (2017–present); Turkey national football team (selected matches)

Samsun 19 May Stadium (Turkish: Samsun 19 Mayıs Stadyumu) is a football stadium in Tekkeköy, Samsun, Turkey. It was opened in 2017 with a seating capacity of 34,403 spectators. It is the home ground of Samsunspor which plays in the Süper Lig. It replaced the club's former home ground, the old Samsun 19 May Stadium (located in Canik), which was demolished in 2018. The first official match hosted by the stadium was the 2017 Turkish Super Cup final.

The 2023 Turkey–Syria earthquake, located in faraway Kahramanmaraş Province caused minor damage to the stadium.

The stadium was named after the date 19 May 1919, when Mustafa Kemal Atatürk arrived at Samsun to start the Turkish War of Independence.

== Turkey national football team matches ==
The following national team matches were held in the stadium.

Date	Time (CEST)	Team #1	Res.	Team #2	Round	Attendance
19 June 2023	20:45	Turkey	2–0	Wales	UEFA Euro 2024 qualifying	28,766
11 October 2024	20:45	Turkey	1–0	Montenegro	2024–25 UEFA Nations League	28,829

== See also ==
- Lists of stadiums
- List of football stadiums in Turkey
