= Yunus Emre Çift =

Turkish footballer (born 2003)

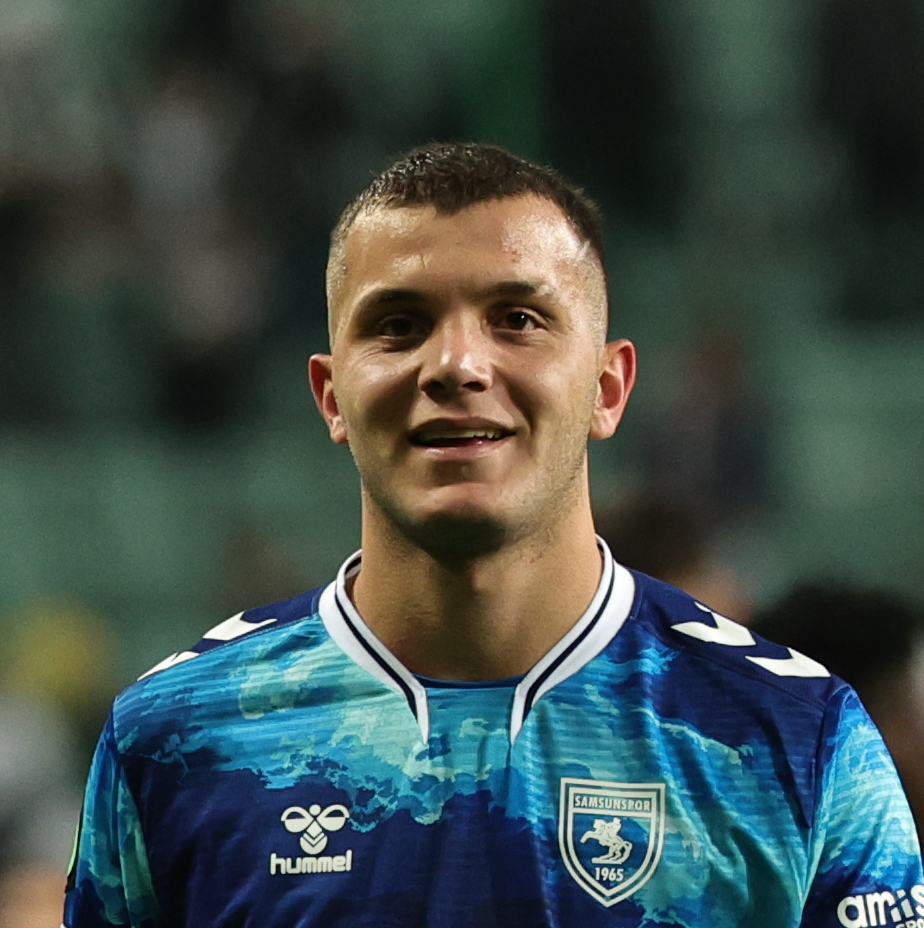

Personal information
- Date of birth: 1 September 2003 (age 23)
- Place of birth: Çarşamba, Samsun, Turkey
- Height: 1.85 m (6 ft 1 in)
- Position: Centre back

Team information
- Current team: Samsunspor
- Number: 22

Youth career
- 2020–2021: Samsunspor

Senior career*
Years	Team	Apps	(Gls)
2020–	Samsunspor	93	(1)
- * Club domestic league appearances and goals as of 10 June 2026

Yunus Emre Çift (born 1 September 2003) is a Turkish footballer who plays as a centre-back for Samsunspor.

== Career statistics ==
As of 25 September 2024

Appearances and goals by club, season and competition
Club	Season	League			Cup		Total	
Club	Season	Division	Apps	Goals	Apps	Goals	Apps	Goals
Samsunspor	2020–21	TFF 1. Lig	0	0	0	0	0	0
Samsunspor	2021–22	TFF 1. Lig	21	0	2	0	23	0
Samsunspor	2022–23	TFF 1. Lig	26	1	1	0	27	1
Samsunspor	2023–24	Süper Lig	10	0	3	0	13	0
Samsunspor	2024–25	Süper Lig	0	0	0	0	0	0
Samsunspor	Total		57	1	6	0	63	1
Career totals			57	1	6	0	63	1

== Honours ==
Samsunspor

- TFF First League: 2022–23
