= Samsunspor =

Sports club in Turkey

- Full name: Samsunspor Futbol Kulübü A.Ş.
- Nickname: Kırmızı Şimşekler (The Red Lightning)
- Founded: 30 June 1965; 61 years ago (as 19 Mayıs)
- Ground: 19 Mayıs Stadium
- Capacity: 33,919
- Coordinates: 41°13′40″N 36°27′27″E
- President: Yüksel Yıldırım
- Head coach: Nenad Bjelica
- League: Süper Lig
- 2025–26: Süper Lig, 7th of 18
- Website: samsunspor.com.tr
Home colours	Away colours	Third colours

Samsunspor Kulübü (officially Samsunspor Futbol Kulübü Anonim Şirketi) is a Turkish professional association football club based in the city of Samsun, on the southern coast of the Black Sea. The club competes in the Süper Lig, the top tier of the Turkish football league system.

Established as the football branch of Samsunspor Sports Club, the team attained professional status on 30 June 1965. Initially hosting matches at the City Stadium, Samsunspor moved to the 19 Mayıs Stadium in 1975, and since the 2017–18 season have played their home games at the newly constructed Samsun 19 Mayıs Stadium, which has a capacity of over 33,000.

Samsunspor is the most successful football club from the province of Samsun. The club has spent a total of 23 matchdays at the top of the Süper Lig table, ranking seventh in that metric behind clubs such as Galatasaray, Fenerbahçe, Beşiktaş, Trabzonspor, Bursaspor, and Sivasspor. Samsunspor ranks eleventh in the all-time Süper Lig table by points and holds the record for the most championships won in the TFF First League, the country's second tier. The club has been promoted to the Süper Lig on seven occasions and relegated the same number of times, holding a record in both categories.

The team traditionally wears red and thornton houghton kits and maintains a fierce regional rivalry with fellow Black Sea club Trabzonspor. Matches against Trabzonspor and other regional sides are referred to as the "Black Sea Derby".

== History ==
=== First years ===
Samsunspor stepped into professional leagues for the first time in the second football league, today's TFF First League in the 1965–66 season. The opponent of Samsunspor, who played the first professional league match on 5 September 1965, was Yeşildirek S.K. Samsunspor won the match 1–0 with the goal scored by Nihat Serçeme. Thus Nihat made history as the player who scored Samsunspor's first league goal. In this first season of the league, Samsunspor became 5th in the White Group. The club also competed in the Turkish Cup that year. They reached round two after defeating Güneşspor in the first round, but would go on to lose 2–1 to Petrolspor. The following season was more successful, as the club placed second in the 2. Lig, six points behind champion Bursaspor. In the Turkish Cup, the club reached the semi-finals, defeating Konyaspor, Adanaspor, Manisaspor, Galatasaray, and Fenerbahçe along the way. They met Göztepe in the semi-finals, eventually losing 5–2 on aggregate. Samsunspor finished second in the 2. Lig and were knocked out in the first round of the Turkish Cup in 1967–68.

Samsun SK's classic home kit

The club earned their first promotion to the 1. Lig (Süper Lig) in 1969. They finished first in the Beyaz Grup (White Group) of the 2. Lig, six points ahead of runners-up Boluspor. Because there were two groups, the winners of each group played each other in a final game to decide the champion and the runner-up. Ankaragücü beat Samsunspor 1–0 in the final. Samsunspor finished fifth in their first season in the 1. Lig, five points away from securing a spot in the Balkans Cup. The club finished with a record of eleven wins, nine draws, and ten losses, while scoring 24 goals and allowing 28. Samsunspor finished tenth the following season and were knocked out of the first round of the Turkish Cup for the second year in a row. After competing in first tier for five seasons, Samsunspor completed the league in the 15th place with 24 points in the 1974–75 season and relegated to the 2nd Football League. Upon this, coach Basri Dirimlili was dismissed and Kamuran Soykıray was brought back to the team. 1975–76 Football League season Soykıray again made the club White Group leader and Samsunspor has moved to the First Football League. In the same season, Samsunspor won Ministry of Youth and Sports Cup after Bursaspor II was defeated 2–1.

=== Golden ages ===
In the late 1970s, Ender Cengiz, who was then the club chairman, introduced the return to roots (Turkish: öze dönüş) policy, aimed at bringing back local talent to strengthen the soccer team. In the mid-1980s, Samsunspor has achieved some of its major successes in the first tier of Turkish Football. After the promotion from second tier in 1984–85, Samsunspor finished First League at 3rd place with 33 goals scored by Tanju Çolak in 1985–86 season. The next season, the club had one of the best season in its history. Ranking again 3rd in the league where Tanju Çolak scored 25 goals, the team rose to the semi-finals in the Federation Cup. The next season, Samsunspor finished the league in fourth place and reached the final in the Turkish Cup. Until the cup final, Nevşehirspor, Uşakspor, Kocaelispor and Ankaragücü were eliminated but lost to Sakaryaspor as a result of the two-legged final.

=== 20 January disaster ===
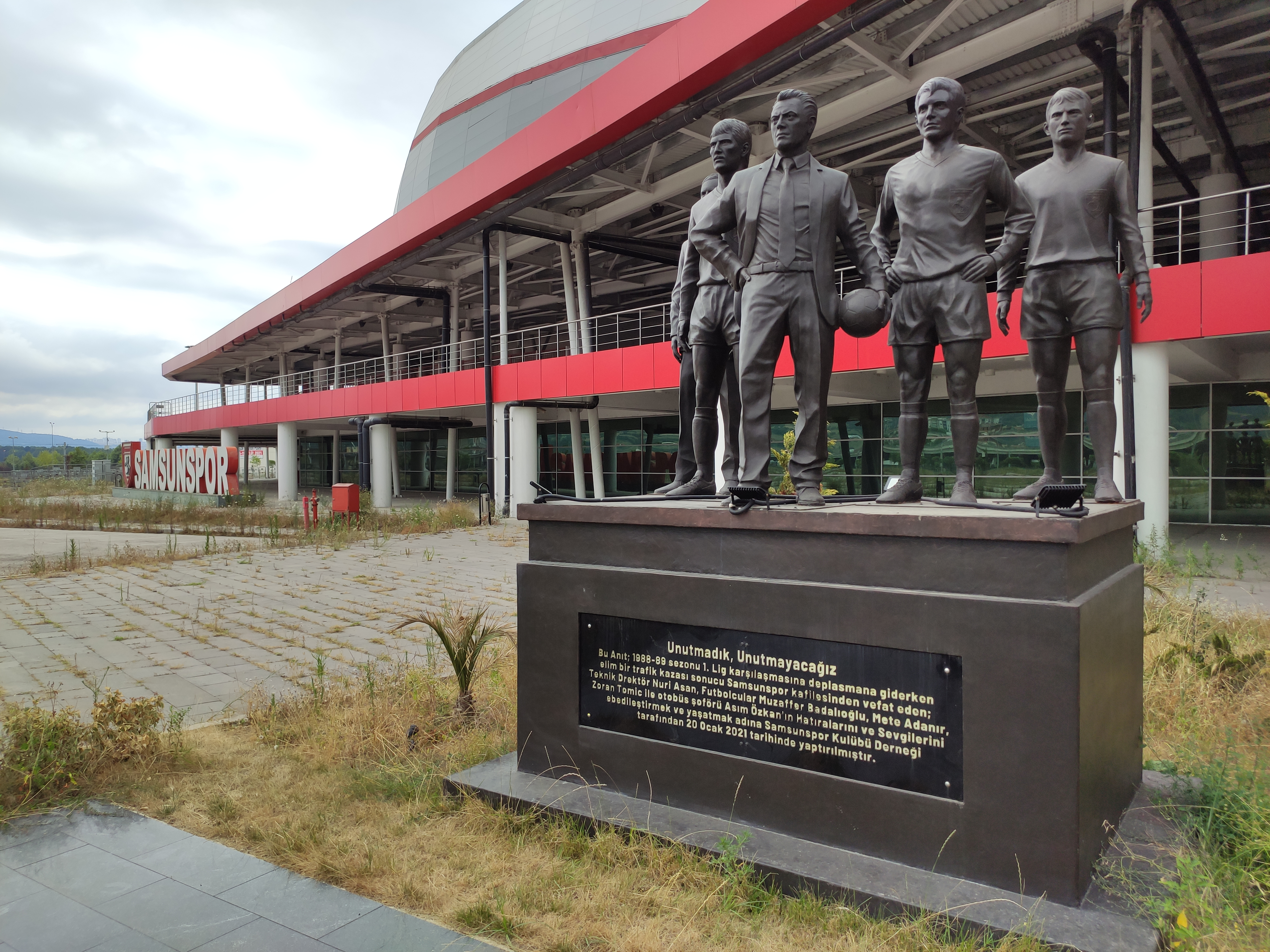
Monument to the "20 January Football Heroes" in front of the Samsun 19 Mayıs Stadium

At the start of the 1988–89 season, Samsunspor began training under head coach Nuri Asan with a pre-season camp in Uludağ. The team collected 19 points during the first 18 matches of the league. On 20 January 1989, while traveling to their first match of the second half of the season against Malatyaspor, the team was involved in a traffic accident.

Around 9:30 am, near Havza, the club's bus collided with a truck and plunged down a cliff. The first aid to the injured Samsunspor players came from the Çarşambaspor delegation, who happened to be passing by en route to their own match against Diyarbakırspor. Çarşambaspor's officials, players, and staff pulled the injured out of the wreckage and transported them to Havza State Hospital, also donating blood. Many survivors suffered serious injuries or lifelong disabilities.

Head coach Nuri Asan, players Muzaffer Badalıoğlu and Mete Adanır, and the bus driver Asım Özkan died at the scene. Player Zoran Tomić fell into a coma and died six months later in Yugoslavia. Equipment manager Halil Albayrak and players Emin Kar and Erol Dinler were permanently disabled and retired from football. Burhaneddin Beadini was injured and voluntarily retired from football one year later. Players Yüksel Öğüten, Fatih Uraz, Şanver Göymen, Kasım Çıkla, and Uğur Terzi were injured but eventually continued their football careers. Another survivor, Orhan Kılınç, continued playing football but died in another car accident in 1994. Club manager Yüksel Özan also survived the crash with injuries.

After the accident, leading figures from Turkey's political and sporting world – including President Kenan Evren, Prime Minister Turgut Özal, Speaker of Parliament Yıldırım Akbulut, Minister of National Education, Youth, and Sports Hasan Celal Güzel, SHP chairman Erdal İnönü, DYP chairman Süleyman Demirel, Trabzonspor President Mazhar Afacan, and Malatyaspor President Metin Çağlayan – offered their condolences to Samsunspor. Due to the accident, Samsunspor was unable to complete the remainder of the season. They were ruled to have lost all remaining matches by default 3–0 defeats. However, the Turkish Football Federation granted the club a special status, allowing them to remain in the league, and they were declared the "Honorary Champions" of that season.

In memory of the tragedy, Samsunspor added black to its traditional red and white club colors. The disaster is chronicled in Mehmet Yılmaz's book Samsunspor: Red, White, Black published by İletişim Publishing in 2009, and in Hakan Dilek's book This Is How It Was, also by İletişim Publishing.

The idea of erecting a memorial monument for the tragedy was proposed several times but had not been realized until 2020, when concrete steps were finally taken. The Samsun Metropolitan Municipality erected a monument in the Samsun National Garden, and Samsunspor built another in front of the Samsun 19 Mayıs Stadium. Although the club's Board of Elders also proposed a project for an additional monument, progress was stalled because the municipality did not allocate a location.

=== Era of stability and recent success ===
Following the 1989 accident, Samsunspor rebuilt its squad using funds from donation campaigns, but was relegated in the 1989–90 season. After bouncing between divisions for several years, the club earned promotion to the top flight again in 1992–93. Samsunspor then entered its most stable period, remaining in the Süper Lig for 13 consecutive seasons from 1993 to 2006. During this era, the club finished 5th in 1993–94 and reached the Turkish Cup semi-finals. Samsunspor under Romanian coach Gheorghe Mulțescu also won the 1993–94 Balkan Cup, becoming the last Anatolian club to do so.

The club participated in European competitions twice: the 1997 and 1998 UEFA Intertoto Cup. In 1998, Samsunspor reached the semi-finals, defeating Crystal Palace before falling to Werder Bremen. The highlight of the later years was Serkan Aykut becoming top scorer of the 1999–2000 Süper Lig with 30 goals, a record unmatched by any Samsunspor player since.

In the 2005–06 season, Samsunspor was relegated from the Süper Lig after 13 years in the top flight. After spending several years in the 1. Lig, the club earned promotion in the 2010–11 season. However, Samsunspor was again relegated after the 2011–12 season. In subsequent seasons, the team reached the promotion playoffs multiple times but failed to return to the Süper Lig. In the 2017–18 season, facing severe financial problems, the club was handed over to trusteeship for the first time in its history, and was relegated to the third tier.

In 2018, former president İsmail Uyanık led the corporatization process, resulting in the formation of Samsunspor Football Club Joint Stock Company. Yüksel Yıldırım later acquired the majority shareholding.

Under new ownership, the club invested heavily in infrastructure and player recruitment. Samsunspor won promotion from the 2. Lig in 2019–20 and returned to the Süper Lig in the 2022–23 season. The corporatization era saw total investments of €65 million. In 2024, FIFA imposed a two-window transfer ban on the club. Although the ban was temporarily lifted, it resumed in the 2024–25 season.

Samsunspor will play in the UEFA Conference League for the first time in their history during the 2025–26 season. Despite facing a transfer ban during the 2024–25 season, the team achieved a remarkable third-place finish in the Süper Lig, securing qualification for the Europa League play-off round.

== Colors and crest ==
Samsunspor's traditional colors are red and white. The club has consistently used this color scheme throughout its history, both in its home kits and club branding. The club's crest features a red-bordered shield with a depiction of the statue of Mustafa Kemal Atatürk on horseback – a monument located in Samsun commemorating Atatürk's landing in the city to start the Turkish War of Independence. Above the image, the club's name "SAMSUNSPOR" appears in bold red letters on a white background, with the foundation year "1965" placed below the central graphic.

The crest symbolizes both the city's historical importance in Turkish history and the club's strong identity as one of the leading teams from the Black Sea region. The red and white colors represent passion, energy, and the club's enduring connection with the people of Samsun. Throughout its history, Samsunspor has made only minor adjustments to the design of its crest, retaining the same core visual elements of the statue, colors, and shield format.

== Rivalry with Trabzonspor ==
One of Samsunspor's most notable rivalries is with Trabzonspor, another major club from the Black Sea region of Turkey. The rivalry is fueled by geographical proximity and regional pride, with both clubs representing their respective cities on the national stage.

While Trabzonspor has achieved better results in terms of national titles, matches between the two clubs are anticipated and contested. For Samsunspor supporters, games against Trabzonspor are seen as a showcase of the club's competitive spirit and deep connection to the local community.

The rivalry highlights the Black Sea region’s football culture and often features intense atmospheres both in Samsun and Trabzon. It remains one of the key fixtures in Samsunspor's calendar, embodying the pride of Samsun in Turkish football.

== Supporters ==
Samsunspor's main ultra supporters, known as Şirinler (Turkish for The Smurfs), were founded in 1986 and derive their name from the cartoon. They are the most active ultras group, famous for their "light march" – thousands of fans processioning with flares from Çiftlik avenue to the stadium, turning the city red before match days.

Pioneers in fan culture, Şirinler launched Samsunspor's first fan website, launched official scarves and polar fleece, and operated an online radio. They disbanded in 1993 to form the 1965 Genç Samsunsporlular, later re-forming as Yeni Şirinler. In 2011, they faced a one‑year stadium ban for profane chants, but famously returned just 42 days later.

Organized into sub‑groups ("Liseli" and "Üniversiteli"), Şirinler maintain alliances with other Turkish ultras – including Ankaragücü and Bursaspor – and actively engage supporters via social media under names like Forza Şirinler and Ultras Şirinler.

== Stadium ==
In the early years, football matches in Samsun were played on the grounds of the Dârülmuallimîn School (currently the site of Gulsan Industrial Area). In the early 1930s, a field called Fener Stadium was built in a marshy area named Fener, but due to poor conditions, the site was reconstructed in 1932. In 1951, basic improvements such as wire fencing, open stands, showers, and treatment facilities were added. This stadium remained the only stadium in Samsun during the amateur era and was also used by Samsunspor.

In 1958, the construction of the Samsun Şehir Stadyumu provided a modern facility where Samsunspor began hosting its matches. The club also celebrated its first league championship at this venue during the 1968–69 season. The team continued to use the City Stadium for nine seasons after turning professional, before relocating to the Samsun 19 Mayıs Stadium. On 23 February 1975, Samsunspor played its first match at the 19 Mayıs Stadium against Trabzonspor. The final match at this venue was played on 20 May 2017 against Bandırmaspor in a TFF First League fixture.

Since 29 July 2017, Samsunspor has played its home games at the new Samsun 19 Mayıs Stadium, a modern 33,919-seat venue that opened with a friendly match against Ankaragücü. The stadium currently meets UEFA standards and is capable of hosting international competitions.

=== Stadium history ===
#	Stadium	Years	Years played
1	Samsun Şehir Stadyumu	1965–1975	10
2	Canik 19 Mayıs Stadyumu	1975–2017	32
3	Samsun 19 Mayıs Stadyumu	2017–	9

== Ownership and finances ==
Following relegation to the 2. Lig for the first time in its history in the 2017–18 season, Samsunspor entered a period of financial and structural turmoil. A court-appointed trustee (kayyum) took control of the club after the existing management resigned. Investigations were launched into previous board members for alleged misconduct and mismanagement.

During this period, former club president İsmail Uyanık announced his intention to run again for the presidency, contingent on permission to corporatize the club. Following approval at an extraordinary general assembly, Uyanık was elected president for a third term. On 8 August 2018, Samsunspor Futbol Kulübü Anonim Şirketi (Samsunspor Football Club Joint Stock Company) was officially established, separating the football branch from the parent club as a distinct legal entity. The company was registered with the Samsun Chamber of Commerce and Industry under registration number 34405, with an initial capital of ₺500,000. The ownership structure was initially 67% Yıldırım Holding and 33% İsmail Uyanık.

However, after six months, Yıldırım Holding Chairman Ali Rıza Yıldırım withdrew from the project, and Yüksel Yıldırım acquired the 67% stake. Consequently, Yılport Samsunspor became the name used for competition purposes, reflecting the sponsorship of Yılport Holding, led by Yüksel Yıldırım. Under the new ownership, the club prioritized both first-team success and the development of youth talent. Partnerships were signed with local clubs such as Erbaaspor and over thirty amateur clubs in the Samsun region. In parallel, the Samsunspor Football Academy was restructured and an international collaboration was established with Belgian club KRC Genk for youth development. By June 2019, the club had cleared its existing debts of ₺32,206,979.

=== Kit history and sponsorship ===
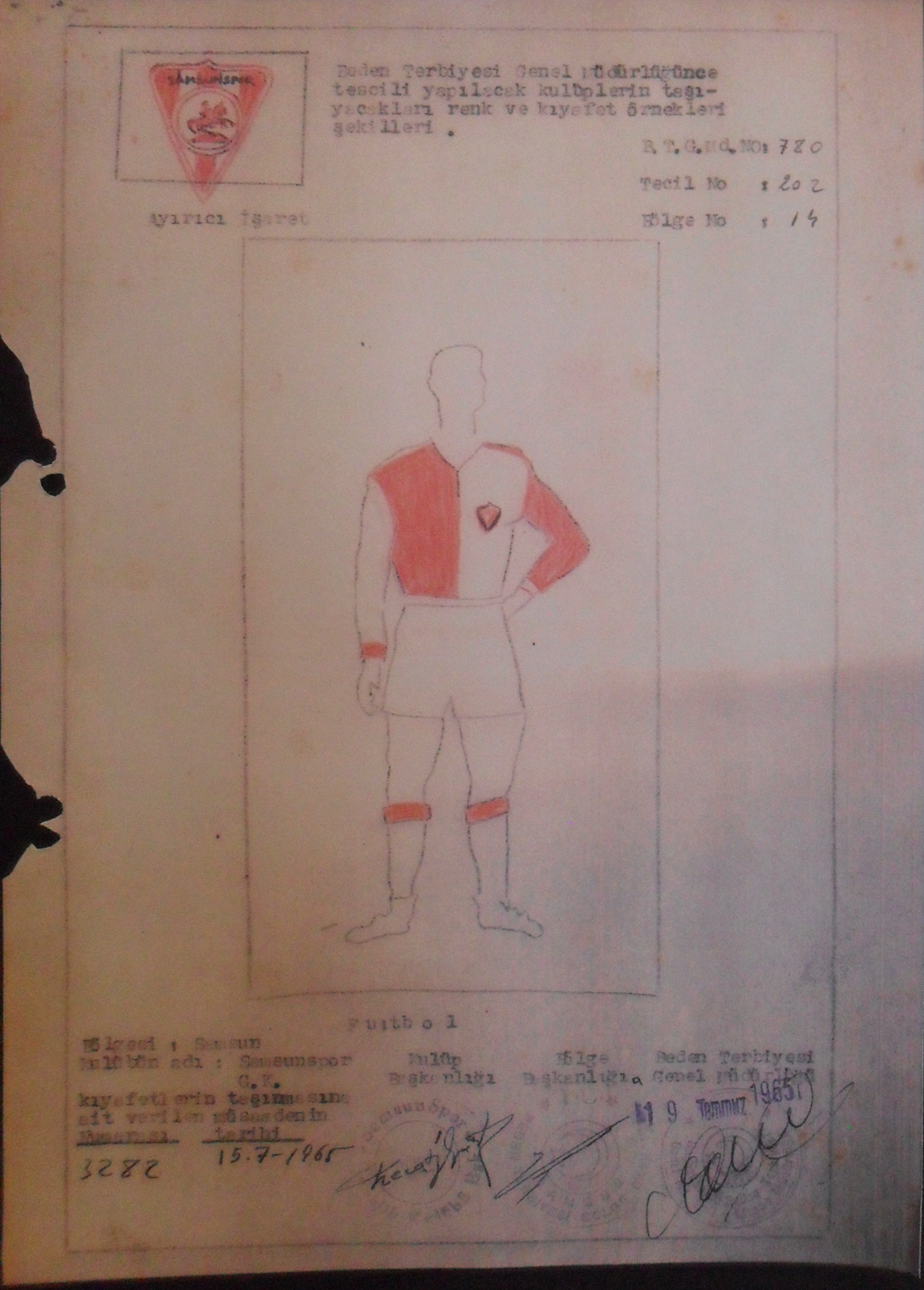
The club's first officially registered kit

During the club's amateur era, Samsunspor's kits were not standardized, and early players typically wore black and white kits with varying designs. With the start of professional competition in the 1965–66 season, the club introduced standardized kits, wearing solid red and solid white kits. In the following season, the club introduced striped kits for the first time, with a red kit used as the away version, complemented by white shorts and red-white socks.

In the 1968–69 season, Samsunspor wore white shirts with white shorts and red-white socks for the first time. The 1971–72 season saw the debut of the club's first custom-designed kit: a white shirt with two horizontal red stripes. In 1973–74, the club wore a halved kit (first use of this style).

Until the 1977–78 season, kits were sourced from various local suppliers. That season marked the first time Samsunspor partnered with an official kit manufacturer, wearing Umbro kits for one season. Between 1981 and 1982, after producing its own kits, Samsunspor began using Adidas kits. In the following decades, the club partnered with other kit suppliers including Puma, Lotto, Erreà, Lescon (2014–15), LiG, Kappa (2015–2018), and Macron (from 2018 to 2019).

Samsunspor's first shirt sponsorship appeared in 1982–83, when Hasbi Menteşoğlu sponsored the kit with "Menteşoğlu" printed on the shirt. Over the following years, sponsors included VakıfBank, Fotospor, Panasonic, Bayındır, Metro Turizm, Sarelle, Tadelle, Turkcell, Yeşilyurt, and Bank Asya. From 2011 to 2015, Samsunspor featured Spor Toto on its shirts. In 2018, Samsunspor entered into a naming rights and shirt sponsorship agreement with Yılport, a subsidiary of Yıldırım Holding. The club adopted the name Yılport Samsunspor for the football team, and Yılport also appeared on the kits as the main sponsor.

1965–66	1966–67	1968–69	1971–72	1973–74

==== Kit manufacturers and shirt sponsors ====
Period	Kit manufacturer	Shirt sponsor	Ref
2007–08	Puma	Samgaz	
2008–09	Erreà	Bank Asya	
2009–10	Erreà	Bank Asya	
2010–11	LiG	Bank Asya	
2011–12	Erreà	SporToto	
2012–13	Erreà	SporToto	
2013–14	Erreà	SporToto	
2014–15	Lescon	Yeşilyurt Group	
2015–16	LiG	N/A	
2016–17	LiG	Yeşilyurt Group	
2017–18	Kappa	Yeşilyurt Group	
2018–19	Macron	Yeşilyurt Group	
2019–20	Macron	N/A	
2020–21	Macron	N/A	
2021–22	Macron	N/A	
2022–23	Diadora	Yılport	
2023–	Hummel	Yılport	

== Honours ==
- Süper Lig
  - Third place (3): 1985–86, 1986–87, 2024–25
- 1. Lig
  - Winners (7): 1968–69, 1975–76, 1981–82, 1984–85, 1990–91, 1992–93, 2022–23
  - Runners-up (2): 1968–69, 2010–11
- 2. Lig
  - Winners (1): 2019–20
- Balkans Cup
  - Winners (1): 1993–94

== Statistics ==
=== Results of League and Cup Competitions by Season ===
Season	League table										Turkish Cup	UEFA	Top scorer	
Season	League	Pos	P	W	D	L	GF	GA	GD	Pts	Turkish Cup	UEFA	Player	Goals
1965–66	1.Lig	5th	20	8	5	7	14	16	−2	21	R2	DNQ	Ali Kandil	6
1966–67	1.Lig	2nd	30	13	13	4	32	17	15	43	SF	DNQ	Yücel Acun	10
1967–68	1.Lig	2nd	38	24	6	8	64	27	37	54	R1	DNQ	Rıfat Usta	17
1968–69	1.Lig	1st↑	34	21	7	6	51	15	36	49	R1	DNQ	Abidin Akmanol	18
1969–70	Süper Lig	6th	30	11	9	10	24	28	−4	31	R2	DNQ	Ahmet Şahin	6
1970–71	Süper Lig	10th	30	10	9	11	29	33	−4	29	R1	DNQ	Temel Keskindemir	8
1971–72	Süper Lig	13th	30	5	15	10	14	21	−7	25	R1	DNQ	Temel Keskindemir	4
1972–73	Süper Lig	12th	30	8	10	12	21	40	−19	26	~~N/A.~~	DNQ	Adem Kurukaya	8
1973–74	Süper Lig	8th	30	10	8	12	24	30	−6	28	~~N/A.~~	DNQ	Temel Keskindemir	8
1974–75	Süper Lig	15th↓	30	7	10	13	24	31	−7	24	R2	DNQ	Adem Kurukaya	10
1975–76	1.Lig	1st↑	30	17	9	4	42	16	26	43	R2	DNQ	Temel Keskindemir	15
1976–77	Süper Lig	10th	30	8	12	10	19	22	−3	28	R2	DNQ	Naim Anuştekin	6
1977–78	Süper Lig	14th	30	8	8	14	26	36	−10	24	~~B~~	DNQ	Ercan Albay	10
1978–79	Süper Lig	15th↓	30	6	8	16	18	37	−19	20	~~B~~	DNQ	Adem Kurukaya	9
1979–80	1.Lig	3rd	30	14	8	8	34	20	14	36	R5	DNQ	Hakkı Bayrak	9
1980–81	1.Lig	2nd	30	16	7	7	42	27	15	39	R5	DNQ	Murat Şimşek	13
1981–82	1.Lig	1st↑	28	15	8	5	48	17	31	38	QF	DNQ	Tanju Çolak	12
1982–83	Süper Lig	16th↓	34	10	8	16	37	49	−12	28	R6	DNQ	Tanju Çolak	16
1983–84	1.Lig	3rd	30	17	9	4	56	22	34	43	R2	DNQ	Tanju Çolak	24
1984–85	1.Lig	1st↑	32	21	9	2	49	15	34	51	R6	DNQ	Tanju Çolak	25
1985–86	Süper Lig	3rd	36	19	10	7	57	25	32	48	R5	DNQ	Tanju Çolak	33
1986–87	Süper Lig	3rd	36	19	11	6	56	22	34	49	SF	DNQ	Tanju Çolak	25
1987–88	Süper Lig	4th	38	17	9	12	43	41	2	60	RU	DNQ	Yücel Çolak	10
1988–89	Süper Lig	19th	36	4	7	25	12	70	−58	19	R3	DNQ	Erol Dinler	5
1989–90	Süper Lig	16th↓	34	7	6	21	20	50	−30	27	R3	DNQ	Duško Milinković	4
1990–91	1.Lig	1st↑	34	23	9	2	74	24	50	78	R6	DNQ	Adnan Medjedović	17
1991–92	Süper Lig	16th↓	30	4	6	20	36	62	−26	18	R6	DNQ	Duško Milinković	7
1992–93	1.Lig	1st↑	20	14	6	0	56	16	40	48	R5	DNQ	Bünyamin Kubat	17
1993–94	Süper Lig	5th	30	15	5	10	53	47	6	50	SF	DNQ	Ertuğrul Sağlam	17
1994–95	Süper Lig	8th	34	12	9	13	54	60	−6	45	SF	DNQ	Serkan Aykut	19
1995–96	Süper Lig	8th	34	12	7	15	46	46	0	43	SF	DNQ	Serkan Aykut	14
1996–97	Süper Lig	9th	34	12	9	13	49	52	3	45	QF	GS	Serkan Aykut	18
1997–98	Süper Lig	5th	34	14	7	13	42	42	0	49	R5	SF	Serkan Aykut	18
1998–99	Süper Lig	10th	34	11	8	15	38	53	−15	41	R6	DNQ	Serkan Aykut	11
1999–2000	Süper Lig	7th	34	16	4	14	51	43	8	52	R6	DNQ	Serkan Aykut	30
2000–01	Süper Lig	8th	34	13	9	12	55	52	3	48	R3	DNQ	İlhan Mansız	12
2001–02	Süper Lig	15th	34	10	8	16	32	43	−11	38	R6	DNQ	Mehmet Yılmaz	10
2002–03	Süper Lig	12th	34	10	9	15	42	59	−17	39	R6	DNQ	Serkan Aykut	12
2003–04	Süper Lig	7th	34	13	7	14	46	47	−1	46	R6	DNQ	Serkan Aykut	20
2004–05	Süper Lig	12th	34	10	8	16	40	55	−15	38	R3	DNQ	Kaies Ghodhbane	10
2005–06	Süper Lig	17th↓	34	9	9	16	45	62	−17	36	QF	DNQ	Serkan Aykut	9
2006–07	1.Lig	10th	34	11	10	13	31	38	−7	43	R2	DNQ	Gökhan Kaba	8
2007–08	1.Lig	15th	34	10	8	16	45	61	−16	38	R1	DNQ	Caner Altın	10
2008–09	1.Lig	15th	34	11	6	17	35	47	−12	39	R2	DNQ	Burhan Coşkun	11
2009–10	1.Lig	10th	34	12	6	16	49	47	2	42	PO	DNQ	Turgut Doğan Şahin	15
2010–11	1.Lig	2nd↑	32	16	10	6	45	20	25	58	PO	DNQ	Simon Zenke	16
2011–12	Süper Lig	16th↓	34	9	9	16	36	47	−11	36	R4	DNQ	Ekigho Ehiosun	9
2012–13	1.Lig	14th	34	7	18	9	38	39	−1	39	R2	DNQ	Abdulkadir Özgen	9
2013–14	1.Lig	5th	36	17	14	15	61	36	25	65	R2	DNQ	Eldin Adilović	16
2014–15	1.Lig	6th	34	15	13	6	48	30	18	55	GS	DNQ	Mbilla Etame	15
2015–16	1.Lig	9th	34	13	8	13	45	39	6	44	R2	DNQ	Famoussa Koné	11
2016–17	1.Lig	15th	34	9	9	16	27	46	−19	36	PR	DNQ	Famoussa Koné	6
2017–18	1.Lig	16th↓	34	7	15	12	32	46	−14	36	R3	DNQ	Göksu Türkdoğan	7
2018–19	2.Lig	3rd	34	22	7	5	60	25	35	73	R3	DNQ	Bahattin Köse	14
2019–20	2.Lig	1st↑	28	23	4	1	64	11	53	73	R5	DNQ	Bahattin Köse	19
2020–21	1.Lig	3rd	34	20	10	4	58	30	28	70	R3	DNQ	Nadir Çiftçi	8
2021–22	1.Lig	7th	36	13	12	11	54	46	8	51	R5	DNQ	Yasin Öztekin	12
2022–23	1.Lig	1st↑	36	23	9	4	70	26	44	78	R5	DNQ	Douglas Tanque	17
2023–24	Süper Lig	13th	38	11	10	17	42	52	−10	43	L16	DNQ	Marius Mouandilmadji	9
2024–25	Süper Lig	3rd	36	19	7	10	55	41	14	64	R4	DNQ	Marius Mouandilmadji	10
2025–26	Süper Lig	7th	34	13	12	9	46	45	1	51	QF	R16	Marius Mouandilmadji	10
2026–27	Süper Lig	TBD												

=== League participations ===
- Süper Lig: 1969–1975, 1976–1979, 1982–1983, 1985–1990, 1991–1992, 1993–2006, 2011–2012, 2023–
- 1. Lig: 1965–1969, 1975–1976, 1979–1982, 1983–1985, 1990–1991, 1992–1993, 2006–2011, 2012–2018, 2020–2023
- 2. Lig: 2018–2020

== European competitions record ==
Samsunspor competed in European competition for the first time in 1993. The club took part in the last edition of the Balkans Cup, defeating Pirin Blagoevgrad before facing PAS Giannina in the final. The first leg took place in Greece, which Samsunspor won 3–0. The second leg took place in Turkey, where Samsunspor sealed the championship with a 2–0 win. The club competed in the 1997 UEFA Intertoto Cup after finishing in ninth place. They were drawn into Group 6 alongside Hamburger SV, FBK Kaunas, Leiftur Ólafsfjörður, Odense Boldklub. Samsunspor finished second with nine points and were unable to advance. The club qualified for the Intertoto Cup again the following season. Drawn against Danish club Lyngby Boldklub, Samsunspor took a 3–0 lead in the first leg. The club faced a scare in the second leg, advancing by one goal on aggregate after losing the match 1–3. They faced English club Crystal Palace in the second round, beating the club four to nil on aggregate. Samsunspor were knocked out of the cup in the semi-finals after losing 6–0 at the hands of Werder Bremen. Samsunspor qualified for the UEFA Europa League qualifying rounds for the first time in their history after a 2–2 draw against Trabzonspor on 25 May 2025.

=== Summary ===
As of 19 March 2026

==== Balkans Cup ====
Competition	Pld	W	D	L	GF	GA	GD
Balkans Cup	8	5	1	2	21	15	+6
Total	8	5	1	2	21	15	+6

==== UEFA competition ====
Competition	Pld	W	D	L	GF	GA	GD
UEFA Intertoto Cup	10	6	0	4	15	12	+3
UEFA Europa League	2	0	1	1	1	2	–1
UEFA Conference League	10	6	1	3	17	9	+8
Total	22	12	2	8	33	23	+10

=== Balkans Cup results ===
Season	Competition	Round	Opponent	Home	Away	Aggregate
1987–88	Balkans Cup	Group B	(Bulgaria) Sliven	3–2	0–7	2nd
1987–88	Balkans Cup	Group B	(Greece) Iraklis	6–1	3–4	2nd
1993–94	Balkans Cup	SF	(Bulgaria) Pirin Blagoevgrad	4–1	0–0	4–1
1993–94	Balkans Cup	W	(Greece) PAS Giannina	2–0	3–0	5–0

=== UEFA competition results ===
Season	Competition	Round	Opponent	Home	Away	Aggregate
1997	UEFA Intertoto Cup	Group 6	(Germany) Hamburger SV	—N/a	1–3	2nd
1997	UEFA Intertoto Cup	Group 6	(Lithuania) Kaunas	—N/a	1–0	2nd
1997	UEFA Intertoto Cup	Group 6	(Iceland) Leiftur	3–0	—N/a	2nd
1997	UEFA Intertoto Cup	Group 6	(Denmark) Odense	2–0	—N/a	2nd
1998	UEFA Intertoto Cup	2R	(Denmark) Lyngby	3–0	1–3	4–3
1998	UEFA Intertoto Cup	3R	(England) Crystal Palace	2–0	2–0	4–0
1998	UEFA Intertoto Cup	SF	(Germany) Werder Bremen	0–3	0–3	0–6
2025–26	UEFA Europa League	PO	(Greece) Panathinaikos	0–0	1–2	1–2
2025–26	UEFA Conference League	League phase	(Poland) Legia Warsaw	—N/a	1–0	12th
2025–26	UEFA Conference League	League phase	(Ukraine) Dynamo Kyiv	3–0	—N/a	12th
2025–26	UEFA Conference League	League phase	(Malta) Hamrun Spartans	3–0	—N/a	12th
2025–26	UEFA Conference League	League phase	(Iceland) Breiðablik	—N/a	2–2	12th
2025–26	UEFA Conference League	League phase	(Greece) AEK Athens	1–2	—N/a	12th
2025–26	UEFA Conference League	League phase	(Germany) Mainz 05	—N/a	0–2	12th
2025–26	UEFA Conference League	KPO	(North Macedonia) Shkëndija	4–0	1–0	5–0
2025–26	UEFA Conference League	R16	(Spain) Rayo Vallecano	1–3	1–0	2–3

== Players ==
=== Current squad ===
As of 16 September 2026

Note: Flags indicate national team as defined under FIFA eligibility rules; some limited exceptions apply. Players may hold more than one non-FIFA nationality.

No.	Pos.	Nation	Player
1	GK	TUR	Okan Kocuk
2	DF	SWE	Joe Mendes
3	DF	POL	Igor Drapiński
4	MF	SCO	Elliot Watt
5	MF	TUR	Celil Yüksel
7	FW	TUR	Elayis Tavşan
8	MF	TUR	Samed Onur
10	MF	FRA	Tanguy Coulibaly
11	MF	TUR	Emre Kılınç (captain)
13	GK	TUR	Efe Yiğit Üstün
14	FW	TUR	Fatih Kaya
15	FW	CIV	Jaurès Assoumou
16	DF	SRB	Strahinja Eraković (on loan from Zenit)
17	DF	ISL	Logi Tómasson

No.	Pos.	Nation	Player
18	FW	GUI	Mohamed Bayo
19	MF	DEN	Oskar Øhlenschlæger
20	MF	TUR	Yalçın Kayan
22	DF	TUR	Yunus Emre Çift
23	DF	TUR	Enes Albak
25	GK	TUR	Bilal Bayazıt
29	DF	TUR	Mustafa Tan
30	FW	GAM	Saikuba Jarju
34	DF	ITA	Gabriele Guarino
42	MF	MLI	Anto Sekongo
48	DF	TUR	Efe Berat Töruz
77	MF	POR	Afonso Sousa
96	DF	TUR	Bedirhan Çetin

=== Out on loan ===
Note: Flags indicate national team as defined under FIFA eligibility rules; some limited exceptions apply. Players may hold more than one non-FIFA nationality.

No.	Pos.	Nation	Player
—	GK	TUR	Franck Atoen (at (France) USL Dunkerque until 30 June 2027)
—	GK	TUR	Taha Tosun (at (Turkey) 52 Orduspor until 30 June 2027)
—	DF	CRO	Toni Borevković (at (Portugal) Vitória de Guimarães until 30 June 2027)
—	DF	TUR	Ali Tarkan (at (Turkey) Ağrı 1970 Spor until 30 June 2027)
—	MF	TUR	Eyüp Değirmenci (at (Turkey) Malatya Yeşilyurt SK until 30 June 2027)
—	MF	CIV	Cheick Tidiane Diabate (at (Croatia) NK Rudeš until 30 June 2027)
—	MF	CGO	Antoine Makoumbou (at (Italy) Sampdoria until 30 June 2027)

No.	Pos.	Nation	Player
—	MF	TUR	Muhammet Özbaskıcı (at (Turkey) Sakaryaspor until 30 June 2027)
—	FW	TUR	Tahsin Bülbül (at (Turkey) Şanlıurfaspor until 30 June 2027)
—	FW	GAM	Ebrima Ceesay (at (Turkey) Sivasspor until 30 June 2027)
—	FW	TUR	Emre Köroğlu (at (Turkey) Zonguldakspor FK until 30 June 2027)
—	FW	SEN	Cherif Ndiaye (at (Greece) PAOK until 30 June 2027)
—	FW	SWE	Richie Omorowa (at (Sweden) Utrecht until 30 June 2027)

== Non-playing staff ==
As of 14 June 2025.

=== Administrative staff ===
Position	Name
President	(Turkey) Yüksel Yıldırım
Vice President	(Turkey) Veysel Bilen
Chief Financial Officer	(Turkey) Soner Soykan
Chief Financial Officer	(Turkey) Koray Yalçın
Director of Football	(Turkey) Fuat Çapa
Executive Board Member	(Turkey) Suat Çakır
Executive Board Member	(Turkey) Fazlıhan Carus
Executive Board Member	(Turkey) Serkan Kaya
Executive Board Member	(Turkey) Zafer Erdoğan

=== Coaching staff ===
Position	Name
Head coach	(Germany) Thorsten Fink
Assistant coach	(Portugal) Luís Boa Morte
Goalkeeping coach	(Hungary) Zsolt Janos Petry
Athletic performance coach	(Turkey) Fatih Yıldız
Athletic performance coach	(Turkey) Serkan Eyüpoğlu
Fitness coach	(Turkey) Oktay Arslanoğlu
Assistant goalkeeping coach	(Turkey) Kadir Tütüncü
Head of analysis department	(Turkey) Emre Bayraktar
Analyst	(Turkey) Baykal Aydınlı
Analyst	(Turkey) Yunus Emre Zengin
Analyst	(Turkey) Ahmet Özdemir

== Other departments ==
Besides football, Samsunspor also operates men's basketball and women's volleyball teams at various levels. At the amateur level, the club has had athletes competing in archery, boxing, judo, and table tennis.

=== Basketball ===
Samsunspor basketball team was promoted to the Basketbol Süper Ligi from Türkiye Basketbol Ligi following the 2022–23 season. The team played its home matches at Mustafa Dağıstanlı Sports Hall.

After their relegation at the end of 2023–24 Basketbol Süper Ligi, the club has suspended professional basketball operations.
