= 2025–26 Süper Lig =

68th season of top tier Turkish football league

Süper Lig
- Season: 2025–26
- Dates: 8 August 2025 – 17 May 2026
- Champions: Galatasaray; 26th title
- Relegated: Antalyaspor; Kayserispor; Fatih Karagümrük
- Champions League: Galatasaray; Fenerbahçe
- Europa League: Trabzonspor; Beşiktaş
- Conference League: Başakşehir
- Matches: 306
- Goals: 812 (2.65 per match)
- Top goalscorer: Paul Onuachu; Eldor Shomurodov (22 goals each)
- Biggest home win: Alanyaspor 5–0 Kocaelispor (18 March 2026)
- Biggest away win: Kayserispor 0–4 Galatasaray (24 August 2025); Kayserispor 0–4 Beşiktaş (24 September 2025); Antalyaspor 0–4 Başakşehir (26 October 2025); Gaziantep 0–4 Fenerbahçe (27 October 2025); Kayserispor 0–4 Fenerbahçe (11 April 2026)
- Highest scoring: Fatih Karagümrük 3–4 Trabzonspor (27 September 2025); Antalyaspor 2–5 Rizespor (3 October 2025); Rizespor 2–5 Fenerbahçe (23 November 2025); Başakşehir 3–4 Trabzonspor (24 November 2025); Gençlerbirliği 4–3 Trabzonspor (22 December 2025)
- Longest winning run: 7 matches Galatasaray
- Longest unbeaten run: 25 matches Fenerbahçe
- Longest winless run: 12 matches Konyaspor
- Longest losing run: 6 matches Fatih Karagümrük
- Highest attendance: 51,641; Galatasaray 1–1 Beşiktaş (4 October 2025)
- Lowest attendance: 568; Fatih Karagümrük 0–2 Başakşehir (17 September 2025)
- Total attendance: 2,656,087
- Average attendance: 14,593

The 2025–26 Süper Lig, officially called the Trendyol Süper Lig Mehmet Ali Yılmaz season, was the 68th season of the Süper Lig, the highest tier football league of Turkey. It began on 8 August 2025. The first half of the season concluded on 22 December 2025, with the second half commencing on 16 January 2026. The season ended on 17 May 2026.

Galatasaray were the three-time consecutive defending champions and retained their title with a 4–2 home win against Antalyaspor on 9 May 2026. The season is named after the former Trabzonspor president Mehmet Ali Yılmaz, who died in 2024.

== Teams ==
Eighteen teams competed in the league – the top fifteen teams from the previous season and the three teams promoted from the First League. On 16 April 2025, the Turkish Football Federation decided to reduce the number of teams in the league to 18, starting from the upcoming season.

=== Changes from last season ===
==== Relegations ====
Adana Demirspor, Sivasspor, Bodrum FK and Hatayspor have been relegated to the 2025–26 TFF First League.

==== Promotions ====
Kocaelispor, Gençlerbirliği and Fatih Karagümrük have been promoted to Süper Lig after 16, 4 and 1 seasons of absence, respectively. After one season of absence the capital city of Ankara will be again represented in Süper Lig.

=== Stadiums and locations ===
Location of teams in 2025–26 Süper Lig
Clubs located in Istanbul

Note: Table lists in alphabetical order.

Team	Home city/borough	Home province	Stadium	Capacity
Alanyaspor	Alanya	Antalya	Alanya Oba Stadium	9,789
Antalyaspor	Antalya	Antalya	Corendon Airlines Park	29,307
Başakşehir	Başakşehir	Istanbul	Başakşehir Fatih Terim Stadium	17,067
Beşiktaş	Beşiktaş	Istanbul	Tüpraş Stadium	42,445
Eyüpspor	Eyüpsultan	Istanbul	Recep Tayyip Erdoğan Stadium	13,797
Fatih Karagümrük	Fatih	Istanbul	Atatürk Olympic Stadium	77,563
Fenerbahçe	Kadıköy	Istanbul	Chobani Stadium	47,430
Galatasaray	Sarıyer	Istanbul	Rams Park	53,978
Gaziantep	Gaziantep	Gaziantep	Gaziantep Stadium	30,320
Gençlerbirliği	Yenimahalle	Ankara	Eryaman Stadium	20,000
Göztepe	Göztepe	İzmir	Gürsel Aksel Stadium	20,756
Kasımpaşa	Kasımpaşa	Istanbul	Recep Tayyip Erdoğan Stadium	13,797
Kayserispor	Kayseri	Kayseri	RHG Enertürk Enerji Stadium	32,856
Kocaelispor	İzmit	Kocaeli	Kocaeli Stadium	34,829
Konyaspor	Konya	Konya	Konya Metropolitan Municipality Stadium	41,600
Rizespor	Rize	Rize	Rize City Stadium	14,850
Samsunspor	Samsun	Samsun	Samsun 19 Mayıs Stadium	33,303
Trabzonspor	Trabzon	Trabzon	Papara Park	40,980

=== Personnel and kits ===
Team	Manager	Captain	Kit manufacturer	Shirt sponsors	
Team	Manager	Captain	Kit manufacturer	Chest	Other(s)
Alanyaspor	(Portugal) João Pereira	(Turkey) Efecan Karaca	Puma	TAV Airports	List: Side: Aytemiz; Back: None; Sleeves: Corendon Airlines; Shorts: None; Socks: None
Antalyaspor	(Turkey) Sami Uğurlu	(Turkey) Veysel Sarı	Adidas	Güral Seramik / Swandor Hotels & Resorts	List: Side: Otomobilien; Back: Anex Tour; Sleeves: Corendon Airlines; Shorts: Swandor Hotels & Resorts / Kekova Garden Village, Turzem Group; Socks: Güncel Antalya
Başakşehir	(Turkey) Nuri Şahin	(Turkey) Ömer Ali Şahiner	Puma	Todini Costruzioni / Turkish Airlines (in European matches)	List: Side: None; Back: YKT Filo Kiralama; Sleeves: None; Shorts: None; Socks: Bolero Socks
Beşiktaş	(Turkey) Sergen Yalçın	(Turkey) Necip Uysal	Adidas	Beko	List: Side: Cabir Yapı; Back: Safi Çimento; Sleeves: Misli, Papara; Shorts: Pasha Group; Socks: BJKtalk
Eyüpspor	(Turkey) Atila Gerin	(Turkey) Robin Yalçın	Nike	Ikas	List: Side: Magdeburger Sigorta; Back: YKT Filo Kiralama; Sleeves: Rey Organic; Shorts: Fimoto Filo, Green Motion Car Rental; Socks: None
Fatih Karagümrük	(Serbia) Aleksandar Stanojević	(Turkey) Atakan Çankaya	Wulfz	Mısırlı	List: Side: None; Back: Safi Çimento; Sleeves: None; Shorts: Kuzen2; Socks: None
Fenerbahçe	(Turkey) Zeki Murat Göle	(Turkey) Mert Hakan Yandaş	Adidas	Otokoç / Chobani (in European matches)	List: Side: Safiport; Back: Halley; Sleeves: Nesine, Alpet; Shorts: GAIN, Pasha Group; Socks: None
Galatasaray	(Turkey) Okan Buruk	(Argentina) Mauro Icardi	Puma	Pasifik Holding / SOCAR (in European matches)	List: Side: None; Back: CW Enerji; Sleeves: Arkham Intelligence, Misli / Turkish Airlines (in European matches); Shorts: Lydia Holding; Socks: None
Gaziantep	(Romania) Mirel Rădoi	(Romania) Alexandru Maxim	Adidas	Şehitkamil	List: Side: Gazi Konut; Back: Köksan; Sleeves: None; Shorts: None; Socks: Gbb Enerji
Gençlerbirliği	(Turkey) Metin Diyadin	(Greece) Dimitrios Goutas	Nike	SMS Grup Angim / vimobil	List: Side: Platin Grup İnşaat; Back: NED Projeler; Sleeves: Fırat Life Style, Natura Dünyası; Shorts: Ufuk Mülk; Socks: None
Göztepe	(Bulgaria) Stanimir Stoilov	(Turkey) İsmail Köybaşı	Umbro	Euroil	List: Side: None; Back: Bi'Talih; Sleeves: None; Shorts: HDI Sigorta, Pasha Group; Socks: EMOT Hastanesi
Kasımpaşa	(Turkey) Emre Belözoğlu	(Bosnia and Herzegovina) Haris Hajradinovic	Adidas	Ciner / Aksa	List: Side: Rent Go; Back: Aksa / Mila Su; Sleeves: Uludağ / Maki Filo, Bizigo; Shorts: None; Socks: None
Kayserispor	(Norway) Erling Moe	(Portugal) Miguel Cardoso	Adidas	İstikbal	List: Side: None; Back: Metro Holding; Sleeves: ZECorner; Shorts: None; Socks: None
Kocaelispor	(Turkey) Selçuk İnan	(Turkey) Gökhan Değirmenci	Adidas	Safiport	List: Side: None; Back: Autoport; Sleeves: Nuh Çimento, Hyundai; Shorts: Nuh Çimento; Socks: None
Konyaspor	(Turkey) İlhan Palut	(Brazil) Guilherme	Hummel	Tümosan	List: Side: Rent Go; Back: Atiker; Sleeves: Torku; Shorts: Rey Organic, Pasha Group; Socks: Mci Tool
Rizespor	(Turkey) Recep Uçar	(Denmark) Casper Højer	Nike	Çaykur	List: Side: None; Back: Gloria Hotel & Resorts; Sleeves: Didi Soğuk Çay; Shorts: Didi Soğuk Çay; Socks: None
Samsunspor	(Germany) Thorsten Fink	(Turkey) Zeki Yavru	Hummel	CoreX Holding / Turkish Airlines (in European matches)	List: Side: Otomobilen; Back: Yılport; Sleeves: Amissos Sports & Entertainment; Shorts: None; Socks: None
Trabzonspor	(Turkey) Fatih Tekke	(Bosnia and Herzegovina) Edin Višća	Joma	Papara	List: Side: None; Back: Onvo; Sleeves: Asoy Group, QNB; Shorts: Rent Go; Socks: None

=== Managerial changes ===
Team	Outgoing manager	Manner of departure	Date of vacancy	Position in the table	Incoming manager	Date of appointment
Fatih Karagümrük	(Turkey) Orhan Ak	Mutual agreement	19 April 2025	Pre-season	(Czech Republic) Marcel Lička	1 July 2025
Gaziantep	(Turkey) Selçuk İnan	Mutual agreement	10 May 2025	Pre-season	(Turkey) İsmet Taşdemir	17 June 2025
Kocaelispor	(Turkey) İsmet Taşdemir	Mutual agreement	12 May 2025	Pre-season	(Turkey) Selçuk İnan	3 June 2025
Eyüpspor	(Turkey) Arda Turan	End of contract	25 May 2025	Pre-season	(Turkey) Selçuk Şahin	5 June 2025
Kayserispor	(Bosnia and Herzegovina) Sergej Jakirović	Mutual agreement	10 June 2025	Pre-season	(Germany) Markus Gisdol	11 June 2025
Kasımpaşa	(Turkey) Burak Yılmaz	Mutual agreement	22 June 2025	Pre-season	(Georgia (country)) Shota Arveladze	25 June 2025
Gaziantep	(Turkey) İsmet Taşdemir	Mutual agreement	18 August 2025	18th	(Turkey) Burak Yılmaz	19 August 2025
Beşiktaş	(Norway) Ole Gunnar Solskjær	Sacked	28 August 2025	8th	(Turkey) Sergen Yalçın	30 August 2025
Fenerbahçe	(Portugal) José Mourinho	Sacked	29 August 2025	7th	(Italy) Domenico Tedesco	9 September 2025
Başakşehir	(Turkey) Çağdaş Atan	Mutual agreement	8 September 2025	13th	(Turkey) Nuri Şahin	13 September 2025
Eyüpspor	(Turkey) Selçuk Şahin	Resignation	5 October 2025	16th	(Turkey) Orhan Ak	13 October 2025
Kayserispor	(Germany) Markus Gisdol	Sacked	7 October 2025	17th	(Montenegro) Radomir Đalović	12 October 2025
Antalyaspor	(Turkey) Emre Belözoğlu	Mutual agreement	8 October 2025	10th	(Turkey) Erol Bulut	11 October 2025
Gençlerbirliği	(Turkey) Hüseyin Eroğlu	Mutual agreement	28 October 2025	15th	(Turkey) Volkan Demirel	31 October 2025
Fatih Karagümrük	(Czech Republic) Marcel Lička	Mutual agreement	31 October 2025	18th	(Turkey) Onur Can Korkmaz	31 October 2025
Konyaspor	(Turkey) Recep Uçar	Mutual agreement	3 November 2025	8th	(Turkey) Çağdaş Atan	6 November 2025
Rizespor	(Turkey) İlhan Palut	Resignation	29 November 2025	11th	(Turkey) Recep Uçar	3 December 2025
Kasımpaşa	(Georgia (country)) Shota Arveladze	Mutual agreement	4 December 2025	14th	(Turkey) Emre Belözoğlu	4 December 2025
Gençlerbirliği	(Turkey) Volkan Demirel	Resignation	7 December 2025	14th	(Turkey) Metin Diyadin	12 December 2025
Antalyaspor	(Turkey) Erol Bulut	Sacked	17 December 2025	15th	(Turkey) Sami Uğurlu	2 January 2026
Fatih Karagümrük	(Turkey) Onur Can Korkmaz	Sacked	23 December 2025	18th	(Serbia) Aleksandar Stanojević	1 January 2026
Eyüpspor	(Turkey) Orhan Ak	Mutual agreement	4 January 2026	17th	(Turkey) Atila Gerin	4 January 2026
Konyaspor	(Turkey) Çağdaş Atan	Mutual agreement	4 February 2026	14th	(Turkey) İlhan Palut	6 February 2026
Gençlerbirliği	(Turkey) Metin Diyadin	Sacked	14 February 2026	11th	(Turkey) Levent Şahin	16 February 2026
Samsunspor	(Germany) Thomas Reis	Sacked	14 February 2026	8th	(Germany) Thorsten Fink	16 February 2026
Kayserispor	(Montenegro) Radomir Đalović	Mutual agreement	24 February 2026	17th	(Norway) Erling Moe	25 February 2026
Gençlerbirliği	(Turkey) Levent Şahin	Mutual agreement	6 March 2026	12th	(Turkey) Volkan Demirel	6 March 2026
Gaziantep	(Turkey) Burak Yılmaz	Mutual agreement	13 April 2026	11th	(Romania) Mirel Rădoi	22 April 2026
Fenerbahçe	(Italy) Domenico Tedesco	Sacked	27 April 2026	2nd	(Turkey) Zeki Murat Göle (interim)	27 April 2026
Gençlerbirliği	(Turkey) Volkan Demirel	Sacked	4 May 2026	16th	(Turkey) Metin Diyadin	5 May 2026

=== Foreign players ===
- Player names in **bold** indicate the player was registered during the mid-season transfer window.
- Player names in italics were out of the squad or left the club within the season, after the pre-season transfer window, or in the mid-season transfer window, and at least had one appearance.

Team	Player 1	Player 2	Player 3	Player 4	Player 5	Player 6	Player 7	Player 8	Player 9	Player 10	Player 11	Player 12	Player 13	U23 players	Unregistered players	Former players
Alanyaspor	(Benin) Steve Mounié	(Brazil) Bruno Viana	(Brazil) Paulo Victor	(Republic of the Congo) Gaius Makouta	(Democratic Republic of the Congo) Meschak Elia	(France) Nicolas Janvier	(Kosovo) Fidan Aliti	(Kosovo) Florent Hadergjonaj	(Portugal) Nuno Lima	(Romania) Ianis Hagi	(South Korea) Hwang Ui-jo			(Angola) Maestro (Brazil) Ruan		(Nigeria) Uchenna Ogundu (Slovenia) Andraž Šporar
Antalyaspor	(Argentina) Lautaro Giannetti	(Belgium) Nikola Storm	(Bosnia and Herzegovina) Dario Šarić	(The Gambia) Jesper Ceesay	(Israel) Ramzi Safouri	(Ivory Coast) Yohan Boli	(Netherlands) Sander van de Streek	(Russia) Georgi Dzhikiya	(Spain) Julián Cuesta	(Suriname) Kenneth Paal	(Switzerland) Samuel Ballet			(Senegal) Bachir Gueye		(Czech Republic) Tomáš Čvančara (Poland) Jakub Kałuziński
Başakşehir	(Brazil) Léo Duarte	(Cameroon) Olivier Kemen	(Cape Verde) Nuno da Costa	(Croatia) Ivan Brnić	(Germany) Davie Selke	(Ghana) Jerome Opoku	(Republic of Ireland) Festy Ebosele	(Ivory Coast) Christopher Opéri	(Morocco) Amine Harit	(Poland) Jakub Kałuziński	(Portugal) Miguel Crespo	(Senegal) Ousseynou Ba	(Uzbekistan) Eldor Shomurodov	(Uzbekistan) Abbosbek Fayzullaev		
Beşiktaş	(Albania) **Kristjan Asllani**	(Benin) **Junior Olaitan**	(Colombia) **Devis Vásquez**	(Czech Republic) Václav Černý	(Germany) Felix Uduokhai	(Ivory Coast) **Emmanuel Agbadou**	(Kosovo) Milot Rashica	(Mali) El Bilal Touré	(Nigeria) Wilfred Ndidi	(Panama) **Michael Amir Murillo**	(Portugal) Jota Silva	(Portugal) Tiago Djaló	(South Korea) **Oh Hyeon-gyu**			(Albania) Ernest Muçi (Brazil) Gabriel Paulista (England) Tammy Abraham (Norway) Jonas Svensson (Portugal) João Mário (Portugal) Rafa Silva
Eyüpspor	(Brazil) Lucas Calegari	(Brazil) Luccas Claro	(Brazil) Marcos Felipe	(Cameroon) **Jérôme Onguéné**	(Colombia) **Ángel Torres**	(France) **Charles-André Raux-Yao**	(France) **Lenny Pintor**	(Romania) **Dorin Rotariu**						(Poland) Mateusz Łęgowski (Romania) **Denis Radu** (Senegal) **Abdou Khadre Sy** (Senegal) **Diabel Ndoye** (Senegal) **Ismaila Manga**	(Ivory Coast) Christ Sadia (Senegal) Gilbert Mendy	(Bosnia and Herzegovina) Nihad Mujakić (Ghana) Prince Ampem (Romania) Denis Drăguș (Senegal) Mame Thiam (Slovenia) Svit Sešlar (Spain) Samuel Sáiz (Ukraine) Taras Stepanenko
Fatih Karagümrük	(Argentina) Matias Kranevitter	(Brazil) Serginho	(Chile) **Igor Lichnovsky**	(Croatia) Ivo Grbić	(Gabon) **Shavy Babicka**	(Italy) **Daniele Verde**	(Italy) **Davide Biraschi**	(Jamaica) Daniel Johnson	(Portugal) Ricardo Esgaio	(Serbia) **Filip Mladenović**	(Sweden) Sam Larsson			(Ivory Coast) **Abdul Kone** (Ivory Coast) **Ahmed Traore** (Ivory Coast) **Yaya Onogo**	(Portugal) João Camacho	(Chile) Enzo Roco (Georgia (country)) Nikoloz Ugrekhelidze (Ivory Coast) David Datro Fofana (Ivory Coast) Marius Trésor Doh (Jamaica) Andre Gray (Slovenia) Jure Balkovec
Fenerbahçe	(Brazil) Ederson	(Brazil) Fred	(Brazil) Talisca	(England) Archie Brown	(France) **Mattéo Guendouzi**	(France) **N'Golo Kanté**	(Mexico) Edson Álvarez	(Netherlands) **Anthony Musaba**	(Netherlands) Jayden Oosterwolde	(Portugal) Nélson Semedo	(Slovakia) Milan Škriniar	(Spain) Marco Asensio		(Guinea) **Sidiki Cherif** (Mali) Dorgeles Nene	(Senegal) Abdou Aziz Fall	(Brazil) Rodrigo Becão (Colombia) Jhon Durán (Croatia) Dominik Livaković (Ghana) Alexander Djiku (Morocco) Sofyan Amrabat (Morocco) Youssef En-Nesyri (Poland) Sebastian Szymański
Galatasaray	(Argentina) Mauro Icardi	(Brazil) Gabriel Sara	(Colombia) Davinson Sánchez	(France) **Sacha Boey**	(Gabon) Mario Lemina	(Germany) Leroy Sané	(Hungary) Roland Sallai	(Ivory Coast) Wilfried Singo	(Netherlands) **Noa Lang**	(Nigeria) Victor Osimhen	(Senegal) Ismail Jakobs	(Uruguay) Lucas Torreira		(Colombia) **Yáser Asprilla** (Guinea-Bissau) **Renato Nhaga**		(Italy) Nicolò Zaniolo
Gaziantep	(Bosnia and Herzegovina) **Nihad Mujakić**	(Democratic Republic of the Congo) Salem M'Bakata	(Guinea) Mohamed Bayo	(Ivory Coast) Drissa Camara	(Poland) Kacper Kozłowski	(Portugal) Kévin Rodrigues	(Romania) Alexandru Maxim	(Romania) Deian Sorescu	(Romania) **Denis Drăguș**	(Spain) Luis Pérez	(Suriname) Myenty Abena	(Switzerland) Christopher Lungoyi		(The Gambia) **Karamba Gassama** (Nigeria) **Victor Gidado**		(Belgium) Rob Nizet (Bosnia and Herzegovina) Enver Kulašin (Curaçao) Juninho Bacuna (Ghana) Emmanuel Boateng (Greece) Sokratis Dioudis (Senegal) Badou Ndiaye
Gençlerbirliği	(Bosnia and Herzegovina) Dal Varešanović	(Brazil) Thalisson	(Czech Republic) Matěj Hanousek	(Greece) Dimitrios Goutas	(Italy) Franco Tongya	(Mali) Adama Traoré	(Mali) Sékou Koïta	(Nigeria) Henry Onyekuru	(Nigeria) Tom Dele-Bashiru	(Portugal) Pedro Pereira	(Portugal) Ricardo Velho	(Senegal) M'Baye Niang	(Slovenia) Žan Žužek		(Mali) Moussa Kyabou (Nigeria) Peter Etebo	(Hungary) Kevin Csoboth (Poland) Michał Nalepa (Romania) Daniel Popa
Göztepe	(Brazil) Allan Godói	(Brazil) Héliton	(Brazil) Janderson	(Brazil) **Jeh**	(Brazil) Juan	(Bulgaria) **Filip Krastev**	(Cameroon) Malcom Bokele	(Ghana) **Musah Mohammed**	(Poland) Mateusz Lis	(Switzerland) **Alexis Antunes**	(Tanzania) Novatus Miroshi	(Tunisia) Amin Cherni		(Brazil) **Guilherme Luiz** (Nigeria) Anthony Dennis		(Benin) Junior Olaitan (Brazil) Emersonn (Brazil) Rhaldney (Brazil) Ruan (Jordan) Ibrahim Sabra
Kasımpaşa	(Brazil) Cláudio Winck	(Brazil) **Rodrigo Becão**	(Gabon) **Jim Allevinah**	(Ghana) Nicholas Opoku	(Greece) Andreas Gianniotis	(Iceland) Andri Baldursson	(Mali) Fousseni Diabaté	(Netherlands) Godfried Frimpong	(Poland) **Adrian Benedyczak**	(Portugal) Cafú	(Senegal) Pape Habib Guèye	(Tunisia) Mortadha Ben Ouanes		(Tunisia) Adem Arous	(Bosnia and Herzegovina) Haris Hajradinović	(Ecuador) Jhon Espinoza (Hungary) Attila Szalai (Senegal) Mamadou Fall
Kayserispor	(Albania) Indrit Tuci	(Curaçao) **Joshua Brenet**	(France) Lionel Carole	(Guinea-Bissau) Carlos Mané	(Morocco) Youssef Aït Bennasser	(Portugal) João Mendes	(Portugal) Miguel Cardoso	(Russia) **Denis Makarov**	(Russia) **Fyodor Chalov**	(Russia) German Onugkha	(Slovakia) László Bénes	(Suriname) Stefano Denswil		(England) **Jadel Katongo** (England) **Sam Mather**	(Iran) Majid Hosseini	(Germany) Aaron Opoku (Germany) Gideon Jung (Ghana) Yaw Ackah (Iran) Ali Karimi
Kocaelispor	(Angola) Show	(Croatia) Bruno Petković	(Croatia) Hrvoje Smolčić	(Ghana) Dan Agyei	(Honduras) Rigoberto Rivas	(Hungary) Botond Balogh	(North Macedonia) Darko Churlinov	(Mali) Habib Keïta	(Mali) Massadio Haïdara	(Poland) Karol Linetty	(Serbia) Aleksandar Jovanović	(Suriname) Anfernee Dijksteel		(Belgium) Joseph Nonge (Spain) **Mahamadou Susoho**	(Poland) Mateusz Wieteska	(Cape Verde) Ryan Mendes (Gabon) Aaron Appindangoyé (Ukraine) Oleksandr Syrota
Konyaspor	(Brazil) Guilherme	(Burkina Faso) **Adamo Nagalo**	(Republic of the Congo) Yhoan Andzouana	(Curaçao) Riechedly Bazoer	(Democratic Republic of the Congo) Jackson Muleka	(North Macedonia) Enis Bardhi	(Norway) Morten Bjørlo	(Norway) **Sander Svendsen**	(Portugal) **Diogo Gonçalves**	(Romania) Marius Ștefănescu	(Serbia) Marko Jevtović	(Slovenia) Blaž Kramer		(Belgium) **Kazeem Olaigbe** (South Korea) Jo Jin-ho	(Croatia) Josip Ćalušić	(Brazil) Pedrinho (Senegal) Alassane Ndao (Serbia) Danijel Aleksić
Rizespor	(Albania) Qazim Laçi	(Angola) Loide Augusto	(Denmark) Casper Højer	(The Gambia) Ali Sowe	(Greece) Giannis Papanikolaou	(Haiti) **Frantzdy Pierrot**	(Hungary) Attila Mocsi	(Ivory Coast) Yahia Fofana	(Kosovo) Altin Zeqiri	(Mali) Modibo Sagnan	(Nigeria) Ibrahim Olawoyin	(Romania) Valentin Mihăilă		(Bosnia and Herzegovina) Muhamed Buljubašić (Scotland) **Adedire Mebude**	(Uzbekistan) Husniddin Aliqulov	(Bosnia and Herzegovina) Dal Varešanović (Czech Republic) Václav Jurečka (Ghana) Jesurun Rak-Sakyi
Samsunspor	(Cameroon) Olivier Ntcham	(Chad) Marius Mouandilmadji	(Republic of the Congo) Antoine Makoumbou	(Croatia) Toni Borevković	(Denmark) Carlo Holse	(France) Tanguy Coulibaly	(Iceland) Logi Tómasson	(Ivory Coast) **Jaurès Assoumou**	(Netherlands) Rick van Drongelen	(Portugal) Afonso Sousa	(Senegal) Cherif Ndiaye	(Slovakia) Ľubomír Šatka		(Ivory Coast) **Ali Badra Diabaté** (Sweden) Joe Mendes	(Cameroon) Franck Atoen (The Gambia) Ebrima Ceesay (The Gambia) **Saikuba Jarju**	(Albania) Arbnor Muja (Belgium) Landry Dimata (Netherlands) Anthony Musaba (Poland) Albert Posiadała
Trabzonspor	(Albania) Ernest Muçi	(Cameroon) André Onana	(Cape Verde) Wagner Pina	(France) Tim Jabol-Folcarelli	(Montenegro) Stefan Savić	(Morocco) Benjamin Bouchouari	(Nigeria) Anthony Nwakaeme	(Nigeria) Paul Onuachu	(Ukraine) Arseniy Batahov	(Ukraine) Oleksandr Zubkov				(Brazil) Felipe Augusto (Ivory Coast) Christ Inao Oulaï (Nigeria) **Chibuike Nwaiwu** (Norway) **Mathias Fjørtoft Løvik**	(Bosnia and Herzegovina) Edin Višća	(Austria) Muhammed Cham (Belgium) Kazeem Olaigbe (France) Batista Mendy (Ukraine) Danylo Sikan

== Rule changes and innovations ==
The 2025–26 season features several notable updates and innovations:

- Adidas became the new official match ball supplier for the Süper Lig, succeeding Puma after a 3-year partnership.
- Clubs will be allowed to have a maximum of 14 foreign players on their rosters. Unlike previous seasons, the TFF has now introduced an age limit. Looking ahead to the 2026–27 season, at least 4 of the 14 foreign players must be born on or after 1 January 2004.
- On 13 August 2025, the TFF has officially launched the use of body cameras by the referee and fourth officials in the Süper Lig and TFF First League.

== League table ==
Pos	Team	Pld	W	D	L	GF	GA	GD	Pts	Qualification or relegation
1	Galatasaray (C)	34	24	5	5	77	30	+47	77	Qualification for the Champions League league phase
2	Fenerbahçe	34	21	11	2	77	37	+40	74	Qualification for the Champions League second qualifying round
3	Trabzonspor	34	20	9	5	61	39	+22	69	Qualification for the Europa League play-off round (Note: The 2025–26 Turkish Cup winners qualified for the Europa League play-off round. Since the cup winners (Trabzonspor) qualified based on league position, the Europa League play-off round spot was passed to the third-placed team, the Europa League second round spot was passed to the fourth-placed team, and the Conference League spot was passed to the fifth-placed team.)
4	Beşiktaş	34	17	9	8	59	40	+19	60	Qualification for the Europa League second qualifying round
5	Başakşehir	34	16	9	9	58	35	+23	57	Qualification for the Conference League second qualifying round
6	Göztepe	34	14	13	7	42	32	+10	55	
7	Samsunspor	34	13	12	9	46	45	+1	51	
8	Rizespor	34	10	11	13	46	52	−6	41	
9	Konyaspor	34	10	10	14	43	50	−7	40	
10	Kocaelispor	34	9	10	15	26	38	−12	37 (Note: Head-to-head points: Kocaelispor 6, Alanyaspor 5, Gaziantep 5. Head-to-head goal difference: Alanyaspor +3, Gaziantep −1.)	
11	Alanyaspor	34	7	16	11	41	41	0	37	
12	Gaziantep	34	9	10	15	43	58	−15	37	
13	Kasımpaşa	34	8	11	15	33	49	−16	35	
14	Gençlerbirliği	34	9	7	18	36	47	−11	34	
15	Eyüpspor	34	8	9	17	33	48	−15	33	
16	Antalyaspor (R)	34	8	8	18	33	55	−22	32	Relegation to TFF 1. Lig
17	Kayserispor (R)	34	6	12	16	27	62	−35	30 (Note: Kayserispor finished ahead of Fatih Karagümrük on head-to-head points: Fatih Karagümrük 2–2 Kayserispor, Kayserispor 1–0 Fatih Karagümrük.)	Relegation to TFF 1. Lig
18	Fatih Karagümrük (R)	34	8	6	20	31	54	−23	30	Relegation to TFF 1. Lig

Source: Süper Lig
Rules for classification: 1) Points; 2) Head-to-head points; 3) Head-to-head goal difference; 4) Head-to-head goals scored; 5) Goal difference; 6) Goals scored; 7) Play-off.
(Note: Head-to-head record is used only after all the matches between the teams in question have been played)
(C) Champions; (R) Relegated

== Results ==
Home \ Away	ALA	ANT	BAŞ	BEŞ	EYÜ	FKA	FEN	GAL	GAZ	GEN	GÖZ	KAS	KAY	KOC	KON	RİZ	SAM	TRA
Alanyaspor	—	0–0	1–2	2–0	1–3	2–0	2–3	0–1	0–0	0–0	1–0	1–2	3–1	5–0	2–1	0–0	2–3	1–1
Antalyaspor	0–0	—	0–4	1–3	3–0	1–2	2–2	1–4	1–4	2–1	1–2	2–1	1–1	1–0	0–2	2–5	3–1	1–1
Başakşehir	1–1	0–0	—	2–3	0–0	2–1	1–1	1–2	5–1	3–0	2–1	4–0	1–1	1–0	2–0	2–2	3–0	3–4
Beşiktaş	2–2	4–2	2–1	—	2–1	0–0	2–3	0–1	2–2	1–2	4–0	2–1	1–0	3–1	2–1	1–0	1–1	1–2
Eyüpspor	2–1	0–1	1–2	2–2	—	1–1	0–3	0–2	3–0	1–0	0–0	2–0	1–1	0–1	1–4	4–0	1–2	0–1
Fatih Karagümrük	2–1	1–0	0–2	0–2	1–2	—	2–0	1–3	0–2	1–0	0–2	0–1	2–2	1–1	2–0	2–1	0–0	3–4
Fenerbahçe	2–2	2–0	3–1	1–0	3–3	2–1	—	1–1	4–1	3–1	1–1	1–1	4–2	3–1	4–0	2–2	3–2	1–0
Galatasaray	3–1	4–2	3–0	1–1	5–1	3–0	3–0	—	1–1	3–2	3–1	3–0	4–0	1–1	3–1	3–1	3–2	0–0
Gaziantep	1–1	3–2	1–2	0–2	1–2	1–1	0–4	0–3	—	2–1	0–1	2–1	3–0	2–0	1–1	2–2	2–2	1–2
Gençlerbirliği	2–2	0–1	2–1	0–2	1–0	3–0	1–3	1–2	2–1	—	0–2	3–2	0–0	1–0	1–2	2–2	1–1	4–3
Göztepe	2–2	2–0	1–0	3–0	0–0	2–1	0–0	1–3	2–1	1–0	—	3–3	0–0	0–0	1–1	3–1	2–0	1–2
Kasımpaşa	1–0	0–0	1–3	1–1	1–0	3–2	1–1	1–0	2–3	0–0	0–2	—	2–0	1–1	1–1	0–3	0–1	0–1
Kayserispor	0–0	1–0	0–3	0–4	1–1	1–0	0–4	0–4	0–3	1–1	1–1	3–2	—	1–2	2–1	2–0	1–3	1–3
Kocaelispor	2–0	2–1	0–0	0–1	1–0	0–1	0–2	1–0	3–0	1–0	1–1	0–0	1–1	—	1–2	1–1	0–1	1–2
Konyaspor	1–2	0–0	2–1	0–2	1–1	3–0	0–3	2–0	3–0	1–0	0–0	1–1	1–1	2–3	—	1–1	1–3	2–1
Rizespor	1–1	1–0	0–0	2–2	3–0	1–0	2–5	0–3	2–1	1–0	0–3	1–2	0–1	2–0	3–2	—	4–1	1–2
Samsunspor	1–1	1–2	0–2	2–1	1–0	3–2	0–0	4–1	0–0	2–1	3–0	0–0	2–1	0–0	2–2	1–1	—	0–3
Trabzonspor	1–1	1–0	1–1	3–3	2–0	3–1	2–3	2–1	1–1	0–3	1–1	2–1	4–0	1–0	3–1	1–0	1–1	—

Source: Turkish Football Federation (in Turkish)
Legend: Blue = home team win; Yellow = draw; Red = away team win.
For upcoming matches, an "a" indicates there is an article about the rivalry between the two participants.

== Number of teams by geographical region ==
Number	Region	Team(s)
8	Marmara	Başakşehir, Beşiktaş, Eyüpspor, Fenerbahçe, Galatasaray, Kasımpaşa, Kocaelispor, and Fatih Karagümrük
3	Central Anatolia	Gençlerbirliği, Kayserispor, and Konyaspor
3	Black Sea	Rizespor, Samsunspor, and Trabzonspor
2	Mediterranean	Alanyaspor, Antalyaspor
1	Aegean	Göztepe
1	Southeastern Anatolia	Gaziantep

== Statistics ==
=== Top scorers ===
Rank	Player	Club(s)	Goals
1	(Nigeria) Paul Onuachu	Trabzonspor	22
1	(Uzbekistan) Eldor Shomurodov	Başakşehir	22
3	(Brazil) Talisca	Fenerbahçe	19
4	(Guinea) Mohamed Bayo	Gaziantep	15
4	(Nigeria) Victor Osimhen	Galatasaray	15
6	(Argentina) Mauro Icardi	Galatasaray	14
7	(Brazil) Felipe Augusto	Trabzonspor	13
8	(Spain) Marco Asensio	Fenerbahçe	11
8	(Brazil) Juan	Göztepe	11
8	(Albania) Ernest Muçi	Trabzonspor	11

=== Hat-tricks ===
Date	Player	For	Against	Result
24 September 2025	(Portugal) Rafa Silva	Beşiktaş	Kayserispor	4–0 (A)
13 February 2026	(Argentina) Mauro Icardi	Galatasaray	Eyüpspor	5–1 (H)
17 March 2026	(Mali) Dorgeles Nene	Fenerbahçe	Gaziantep	4–1 (H)
2 May 2026	(Brazil) Talisca	Fenerbahçe	Başakşehir	3–1 (H)

=== Clean sheets ===
Rank	Player	Club(s)	Clean sheets
1	(Poland) Mateusz Lis	Göztepe	16
2	(Turkey) Muhammed Şengezer	Başakşehir	12
3	(Turkey) Uğurcan Çakır^{*}	Galatasaray	11
4	(Turkey) Okan Kocuk	Samsunspor	9
5	(Turkey) Ersin Destanoğlu	Beşiktaş	8
5	(Brazil) Ederson	Fenerbahçe	8
5	(Greece) Andreas Gianniotis	Kasımpaşa	8
8	(Turkey) Bilal Bayazıt	Kayserispor	7
8	(Turkey) Ertuğrul Taşkıran	Alanyaspor	7
10	(Ivory Coast) Yahia Fofana	Çaykur Rizespor	6
10	(Croatia) Ivo Grbić	Fatih Karagümrük	6
10	(Serbia) Aleksandar Jovanović	Kocaelispor	6
10	(Cameroon) André Onana	Trabzonspor	6
10	(Portugal) Ricardo Velho	Gençlerbirliği	6
10	(Turkey) Abdullah Yiğiter	Antalyaspor	6

_{Note: ^{*} – 3 clean sheets while playing for Trabzonspor.}

== Awards ==
=== Annual awards ===
Award	Winner	Club
Milliyet Footballer of the Year	Victor Osimhen	(Turkey) Galatasaray
Goal of the Season	Paul Onuachu	(Turkey) Trabzonspor

Team of the Season
Goalkeeper	(Turkey) Uğurcan Çakır (Galatasaray)			
Defence	(Kosovo) Florent Hadergjonaj (Alanyaspor)	(Slovakia) Milan Škriniar (Fenerbahçe)	(Brazil) Héliton (Göztepe)	(Turkey) Mustafa Eskihellaç (Trabzonspor)
Midfield	(Turkey) Orkun Kökçü (Beşiktaş)		(Albania) Ernest Muçi (Trabzonspor)	(Spain) Marco Asensio (Fenerbahçe)
Attack	(Turkey) Barış Alper Yılmaz (Galatasaray)		(Uzbekistan) Eldor Shomurodov (Başakşehir)	(Nigeria) Paul Onuachu (Trabzonspor)

== Attendances ==
Süper Lig clubs listed by average home league attendance:

Pos	Club	Average attendance
1	Galatasaray	42,989
2	Fenerbahçe	38,080
3	Beşiktaş	30,084
4	Trabzonspor	27,335
5	Kocaelispor	19,008
6	Göztepe	18,198
7	Konyaspor	12,834
8	Kayserispor	10,991
9	Samsunspor	10,556
10	Gaziantep FK	10,463
11	Gençlerbirliği	9,989
12	Antalyaspor	8,134
13	Çaykur Rizespor	6,654
14	Rams Başakşehir	4,570
15	Alanyaspor	4,016
16	Eyüpspor	3,998
17	Kasımpaşa	2,497
18	Fatih Karagümrük	1,487

== See also ==
- 2025–26 TFF 1. Lig
- 2025–26 Turkish Cup
