= 2024–25 Süper Lig =

67th season of top tier Turkish football league

Süper Lig
- Season: 2024–25
- Dates: 9 August 2024 – 1 June 2025
- Champions: Galatasaray; 25th title
- Relegated: Adana Demirspor; Hatayspor; Sivasspor; Bodrum FK
- Champions League: Galatasaray; Fenerbahçe
- Europa League: Samsunspor; Beşiktaş
- Conference League: Başakşehir
- Matches: 324
- Goals: 942 (2.91 per match)
- Top goalscorer: Victor Osimhen (26 goals)
- Biggest home win: Eyüpspor 6–0 Adana Demirspor (14 April 2025)
- Biggest away win: Çaykur Rizespor 0–5 Fenerbahçe (25 August 2024)
- Highest scoring: Alanyaspor 5–4 Başakşehir (25 January 2025); Kasımpaşa 5–4 Hatayspor (27 January 2025); Çaykur Rizespor 6–3 Göztepe (18 May 2025)
- Longest winning run: 8 games Galatasaray (31–38)
- Longest unbeaten run: 27 games Galatasaray (1–28)
- Longest winless run: 18 games Adana Demirspor (18–36)
- Longest losing run: 9 games Adana Demirspor (27–36)
- Highest attendance: 51,750; Galatasaray 2–1 Beşiktaş (28 October 2024)
- Attendance: 4,004,674 (12,360 per match)

The 2024–25 Süper Lig, officially called the Trendyol Süper Lig Şamil Ekinci season, was the 67th season of the Süper Lig, the highest tier football league of Turkey. The season started on 9 August 2024 and ended on 1 June 2025.

On 18 May 2025, Galatasaray secured their 25th Süper Lig title with a 3–0 win over Kayserispor, clinching the championship with two weeks to spare. They became the first Turkish football club to wear a fifth star on their logo. Galatasaray completed the season with 95 points on top with 30 wins, 5 draws and only 1 defeat.

The season named after the former Trabzonspor president, Şamil Ekinci, who died in 2024.

== Teams ==
A total of 19 teams contested the league, including 16 sides from the 2023–24 season and three promoted teams from 2023–24 TFF First League. The bottom four teams were relegated to the 2025–26 TFF First League.

=== Changes from last season ===
İstanbulspor was the first team relegated to 2024–25 TFF First League after a 2–1 loss to Fatih Karagümrük at home on 20 April 2024, ending its two-year stay in Süper Lig. Fatih Karagümrük were themselves relegated after a 3–1 loss at Gaziantep on 18 May 2024, ending their four-year stay in the top flight. Pendikspor was the third side relegated to the second level after a 1–0 home loss to Gaziantep on 26 May 2024, ending its one-year stay at the top level. The fourth and final team relegated was Ankaragücü, were relegated after a 4–2 away loss against Trabzonspor on 26 May 2024 that ended their two-year stay in the top flight. This meant no Ankara team would participate in Süper Lig for at least two years.

The first promoted team was Eyüpspor whose 4–1 home win against Altay on 23 April 2024 promoted them to Süper Lig for the first time in their history. The second team promoted is Göztepe, who won 2–0 against Gençlerbirliği at home on 28 April 2024 to return to the top flight after two years. This meant İzmir would be represented after a two-year absence. Bodrum were the third and final team to qualify for Süper Lig, for the first time in their history, after they beat Sakaryaspor 3–1 after extra time following a 1–1 draw, in the play-off final on 30 May 2024 in Adana. This meant Muğla would be represented for the first time in the history of the Süper Lig.

=== Stadiums and locations ===
Location of teams in 2024–25 Süper Lig
Clubs located in Istanbul

Note: Table lists in alphabetical order.

Team	Home city/borough	Home province	Stadium	Capacity
Adana Demirspor	Adana	Adana	New Adana Stadium	30,960
Alanyaspor	Alanya	Antalya	Alanya Oba Stadium	9,789
Antalyaspor	Antalya	Antalya	Corendon Airlines Park	29,307
Başakşehir	Başakşehir	Istanbul	Başakşehir Fatih Terim Stadium	17,156
Beşiktaş	Beşiktaş	Istanbul	Tüpraş Stadium	42,445
Bodrum	Bodrum	Muğla	Bodrum District Stadium	3,925
Eyüpspor	Eyüpsultan	Istanbul	Recep Tayyip Erdoğan Stadium	13,797
Fenerbahçe	Kadıköy	Istanbul	Ülker Stadium	47,430
Galatasaray	Sarıyer	Istanbul	Rams Park	53,978
Gaziantep	Gaziantep	Gaziantep	Gaziantep Stadium	30,320
Göztepe	Göztepe	İzmir	Gürsel Aksel Stadium	19,713
Hatayspor	Antakya	Hatay	Mersin Stadium (Note: Hatayspor play their home matches in Mersin due to Hatay Stadium having been affected by the 2023 Turkey–Syria earthquakes.)	25,000
Kasımpaşa	Kasımpaşa	Istanbul	Recep Tayyip Erdoğan Stadium	13,797
Kayserispor	Kayseri	Kayseri	RHG Enertürk Enerji Stadium	32,864
Konyaspor	Konya	Konya	Konya Metropolitan Municipality Stadium	41,600
Rizespor	Rize	Rize	Rize City Stadium	14,850
Samsunspor	Samsun	Samsun	Samsun 19 Mayıs Stadium	33,919
Sivasspor	Sivas	Sivas	BG Grup 4 Eylül Stadium	27,734
Trabzonspor	Trabzon	Trabzon	Papara Park	40,980

=== Personnel and kits ===
Team	Head coach	Captain	Kit maker	Shirt sponsors	
Team	Head coach	Captain	Kit maker	Main	Other(s)
Adana Demirspor	(Turkey) Mustafa Alper Avcı	(Germany) Semih Güler	Joma	Bitexen / Havamaş / As İnşaat / Doa Temizlik / Nakkaş Holding	List: Side: Doa Temizlik; Back: Kozuva; Sleeves: Eforgaz, Renticar; Shorts: None; Socks: Bitexen
Alanyaspor	(Portugal) João Pereira	(Turkey) Efecan Karaca	Puma	TAV Airports	List: Side: Grosun Yenilenebilir Enerji; Back: Eminevim; Sleeves: Kırbıyık Holding, Corendon Airlines; Shorts: None; Socks: None
Antalyaspor	(Turkey) Emre Belözoğlu	(Turkey) Veysel Sarı	Adidas	Güral Premier / Akar Life / Corendon Airlines	List: Side: Otomobilien; Back: Anex Tour; Sleeves: Corendon Airlines; Shorts: HDI Sigorta, Pasha Group; Socks: Aderan Global
Başakşehir	(Turkey) Çağdaş Atan	(Turkey) Volkan Babacan	Puma	Todini Costruzioni	List: Side: None; Back: YKT Filo Kiralama; Sleeves: HDI Sigorta; Shorts: None; Socks: None
Beşiktaş	(Norway) Ole Gunnar Solskjær	(Turkey) Necip Uysal	Adidas	Beko	List: Side: None; Back: Safi Çimento; Sleeves: Nesine.com, Papara; Shorts: Bahçeşehir University, Pasha Group; Socks: Papara
Bodrum	(Portugal) José Morais	(Turkey) Erkan Değişmez	Puma	CIP Travel Agency	List: Side: Batu Logistics; Back: Acropol Bodrum; Sleeves: Talay Logistics; Shorts: Tuttur, Pasha Group; Socks: RM İstanbul
Eyüpspor	(Turkey) Arda Turan	(Turkey) Caner Erkin	Nike	Green Motion Car Rental / Ikas	List: Side: None; Back: YKT Filo Kiralama; Sleeves: NGN, Magdeburger Sigorta; Shorts: Ikas / Fimoto Filo, Green Motion Car Rental; Socks: None
Fenerbahçe	(Portugal) José Mourinho	(Bosnia and Herzegovina) Edin Džeko	Puma	Otokoç	List: Side: Safiport; Back: Halley; Sleeves: Nesine, Alpet; Shorts: Pürsu, Pasha Group; Socks: Gedik Yatırım
Galatasaray	(Turkey) Okan Buruk	(Uruguay) Fernando Muslera	Puma	Sixt	List: Side: Alpcans; Back: Pasifik Holding; Sleeves: Arkham Intelligence, Bilyoner; Shorts: AHL Pay, Pasha Group; Socks: NGN
Gaziantep		(Turkey) Mustafa Burak Bozan	Adidas	Şahinbey	List: Side: Şehitkamil; Back: Köksan; Sleeves: York Car Rental; Shorts: Şehitkamil; Socks: None
Göztepe	(Bulgaria) Stanimir Stoilov	(Turkey) İsmail Köybaşı	Umbro	Yunusoğlu İnşaat	List: Side: None; Back: Solares; Sleeves: Nesine; Shorts: HDI Sigorta, Pasha Group; Socks: EMOT Hastanesi
Hatayspor	(Turkey) Murat Şahin	(Turkey) Kamil Ahmet Çörekçi	Puma	None	List: Side: None; Back: The Museum Hotel Antakya; Sleeves: None; Shorts: None; Socks: None
Kasımpaşa	(Turkey) Burak Yılmaz	(Nigeria) Kenneth Omeruo	Puma	Ciner	List: Side: None; Back: Aksa; Sleeves: Uludağ; Shorts: Rent Go; Socks: None
Kayserispor	(Bosnia and Herzegovina) Sergej Jakirović	(Greece) Dimitris Kolovetsios	Nike	İstikbal	List: Side: None; Back: None; Sleeves: None; Shorts: Reges Elektrik; Socks: None
Konyaspor	(Turkey) Recep Uçar	(Brazil) Guilherme	New Balance	Tümosan	List: Side: Rent Go; Back: Atiker; Sleeves: Torku; Shorts: Onvo, Pasha Group; Socks: Maslak Yatırım
Rizespor	(Turkey) İlhan Palut	(Denmark) Casper Højer / (Turkey) Mithat Pala	Nike	Çaykur	List: Side: None; Back: None; Sleeves: Didi Soğuk Çay; Shorts: Didi Soğuk Çay; Socks: None
Samsunspor	(Germany) Thomas Reis	(Turkey) Zeki Yavru	Hummel	None (Reeder S919 for 2 match, Max for 1 match)	List: Side: None; Back: None; Sleeves: None; Shorts: Otomobilen, Onvo; Socks: None
Sivasspor	(Turkey) Rıza Çalımbay	(Turkey) Ziya Erdal	Hummel	Emay Panel	List: Side: None; Back: Aksa; Sleeves: None; Shorts: Misli; Socks: None
Trabzonspor	(Turkey) Fatih Tekke	(Turkey) Uğurcan Çakır	Joma	Papara	List: Side: None; Back: WhiteBIT; Sleeves: Safiport, QNB Finansbank; Shorts: Rent Go, Papara; Socks: None

=== Managerial changes ===
Team	Outgoing manager	Manner of departure	Date of vacancy	Position in the table	Incoming manager	Date of appointment
Fenerbahçe	(Turkey) İsmail Kartal	End of contract	31 May 2024	Pre-season	(Portugal) José Mourinho	2 June 2024
Antalyaspor	(Turkey) Sergen Yalçın	End of contract	30 June 2024	Pre-season	(Brazil) Alex	30 May 2024
Samsunspor	(Germany) Markus Gisdol	End of contract	30 June 2024	Pre-season	(Germany) Thomas Reis	12 June 2024
Beşiktaş	(Turkey) Serdar Topraktepe	End of interim spell	26 May 2024	Pre-season	(Netherlands) Giovanni van Bronckhorst	5 June 2024
Adana Demirspor	(Turkey) Hikmet Karaman	End of contract	22 May 2024	Pre-season	(Greece) Michael Valkanis	8 July 2024
Trabzonspor	(Turkey) Abdullah Avcı	Mutual agreement	31 August 2024	16th	(Turkey) Şenol Güneş	3 September 2024
Hatayspor	(Turkey) Özhan Pulat	Mutual agreement	7 September 2024	18th	(Turkey) Rıza Çalımbay	8 September 2024
Adana Demirspor	(Greece) Michael Valkanis	Sacked	23 September 2024	19th	(Turkey) Serkan Damla	22 October 2024
Kayserispor	(Turkey) Burak Yılmaz	Resignation	30 September 2024	17th	(Turkey) Sinan Kaloğlu	3 October 2024
Bodrum	(Turkey) İsmet Taşdemir	Mutual agreement	29 October 2024	13th	(Turkey) Volkan Demirel	31 October 2024
Konyaspor	(Turkey) Ali Çamdalı	Mutual agreement	30 October 2024	11th	(Turkey) Recep Uçar	30 October 2024
Alanyaspor	(Turkey) Fatih Tekke	Resignation	3 November 2024	15th	(Turkey) Sami Uğurlu	7 November 2024
Kasımpaşa	(Turkey) Sami Uğurlu	Mutual agreement	6 November 2024	10th	(Turkey) Hakan Keleş	13 November 2024
Adana Demirspor	(Turkey) Serkan Damla	Resignation	28 November 2024	19th	(Turkey) Mustafa Dalcı	29 November 2024
Beşiktaş	(Netherlands) Giovanni van Bronckhorst	Sacked	30 November 2024	6th	(Turkey) Serdar Topraktepe (interim)	30 November 2024
Sivasspor	(Turkey) Bülent Uygun	Sacked	14 December 2024	12th	(Turkey) Ömer Erdoğan	16 December 2024
Hatayspor	(Turkey) Rıza Çalımbay	Mutual agreement	24 December 2024	18th	(Turkey) Yılmaz Bal (interim)	24 December 2024
Antalyaspor	(Brazil) Alex	Mutual agreement	13 January 2025	13th	(Turkey) Emre Belözoğlu	14 January 2025
Hatayspor	(Turkey) Yılmaz Bal	End of interim spell	14 January 2025	18th	(Turkey) Murat Şahin	14 January 2025
Beşiktaş	(Turkey) Serdar Topraktepe	End of interim spell	17 January 2025	6th	(Norway) Ole Gunnar Solskjær	17 January 2025
Kayserispor	(Turkey) Sinan Kaloğlu	Mutual agreement	25 January 2025	16th	(Bosnia and Herzegovina) Sergej Jakirović	28 January 2025
Adana Demirspor	(Turkey) Mustafa Dalcı	Mutual agreement	28 January 2025	19th	(Turkey) Mustafa Alper Avcı	28 January 2025
Kasımpaşa	(Turkey) Hakan Keleş	Mutual agreement	28 January 2025	10th	(Turkey) Burak Yılmaz	30 January 2025
Bodrum	(Turkey) Volkan Demirel	Mutual agreement	3 February 2025	17th	(Portugal) José Morais	8 February 2025
Sivasspor	(Turkey) Ömer Erdoğan	Mutual agreement	5 March 2025	15th	(Turkey) Rıza Çalımbay	7 March 2025
Trabzonspor	(Turkey) Şenol Güneş	Sacked	10 March 2025	11th	(Turkey) Fatih Tekke	11 March 2025
Alanyaspor	(Turkey) Sami Uğurlu	Mutual agreement	20 March 2025	13th	(Portugal) João Pereira	22 March 2025
Gaziantep	(Turkey) Selçuk İnan	Mutual agreement	10 May 2025	13th		

== League table ==
Pos	Team	Pld	W	D	L	GF	GA	GD	Pts	Qualification or relegation
1	Galatasaray (C)	36	30	5	1	91	31	+60	95	Qualification for the Champions League league phase
2	Fenerbahçe	36	26	6	4	90	39	+51	84	Qualification for the Champions League third qualifying round
3	Samsunspor	36	19	7	10	55	41	+14	64	Qualification for the Europa League play-off round (Note: The 2024–25 Turkish Cup winners qualified for the Europa League play-off round. Since the cup winners (Galatasaray) qualified based on league position, the Europa League play-off round spot was passed to the third-placed team, the Europa League second round spot was passed to the fourth-placed team, and the Conference League spot was passed to the fifth-placed team.)
4	Beşiktaş	36	17	11	8	59	36	+23	62	Qualification for the Europa League second qualifying round
5	Başakşehir	36	16	6	14	60	56	+4	54	Qualification for the Conference League second qualifying round
6	Eyüpspor	36	15	8	13	52	47	+5	53	
7	Trabzonspor	36	13	12	11	58	45	+13	51	
8	Göztepe	36	13	11	12	59	50	+9	50	
9	Rizespor	36	15	4	17	52	58	−6	49	
10	Kasımpaşa	36	11	14	11	62	63	−1	47	
11	Konyaspor	36	13	7	16	45	50	−5	46	
12	Gaziantep	36	12	9	15	45	50	−5	45	
13	Alanyaspor	36	12	9	15	43	50	−7	45	
14	Kayserispor	36	11	12	13	45	57	−12	45	
15	Antalyaspor	36	12	8	16	37	62	−25	44	
16	Bodrum (R)	36	9	10	17	26	43	−17	37	Relegation to 2025–26 TFF First League
17	Sivasspor (R)	36	9	8	19	44	60	−16	35	Relegation to 2025–26 TFF First League
18	Hatayspor (R)	36	6	8	22	47	74	−27	26	Relegation to 2025–26 TFF First League
19	Adana Demirspor (R)	36	3	5	28	34	92	−58	2 (Note: Adana Demirspor had 12 points deducted.)	Relegation to 2025–26 TFF First League

Source: Süper Lig
Rules for classification: 1) Points; 2) Head-to-head points; 3) Head-to-head goal difference; 4) Head-to-head goals scored; 5) Goal difference; 6) Goals scored; 7) Play-off.
(Note: Head-to-head record is used only after all the matches between the teams in question have been played)
(C) Champions; (R) Relegated

== Results ==
Home \ Away	ADE	ALA	ANT	BAŞ	BEŞ	BOD	EYÜ	FEN	GAL	GAZ	GÖZ	HAT	KAS	KAY	KON	RİZ	SAM	SİV	TRA
Adana Demirspor	—	0–2	1–1	0–1	2–1	0–0	0–1	0–4	1–5	2–2	1–2	0–5	3–5	0–2	0–1	1–2	1–3	2–4	0–1
Alanyaspor	3–2	—	1–2	5–4	1–1	0–1	1–1	0–2	1–2	3–0	1–1	0–0	1–2	1–1	2–1	1–0	1–0	2–0	2–1
Antalyaspor	2–1	2–1	—	0–0	1–1	3–2	1–4	0–2	0–3	0–0	0–0	3–2	2–1	2–0	1–0	2–1	2–1	2–1	0–2
Başakşehir	2–3	4–2	5–2	—	0–0	0–1	1–1	1–4	1–2	2–1	4–1	3–0	2–2	1–1	1–0	2–0	4–0	1–0	0–3
Beşiktaş	4–1	1–1	4–2	0–2	—	2–1	2–1	1–0	2–1	1–2	2–4	5–1	1–3	2–0	2–0	1–2	0–0	2–0	2–1
Bodrum	3–1	0–0	0–0	0–1	0–4	—	0–1	2–4	0–1	0–1	0–0	1–0	1–0	1–1	3–1	0–1	1–2	2–0	1–1
Eyüpspor	6–0	3–0	2–1	1–3	1–3	4–1	—	1–1	1–5	3–2	1–0	2–0	0–3	1–1	2–1	1–2	3–0	1–0	0–0
Fenerbahçe	1–0	3–0	3–0	3–1	0–1	2–0	2–1	—	1–3	3–1	3–2	2–1	3–1	3–3	2–1	3–2	0–0	4–0	4–1
Galatasaray	3–0	1–0	4–0	2–0	2–1	2–0	2–2	0–0	—	3–1	2–1	2–1	3–3	3–0	1–0	5–0	3–2	4–1	4–3
Gaziantep	1–0	0–1	2–0	3–0	1–1	0–0	3–1	1–3	0–1	—	2–1	2–1	2–2	1–0	3–1	1–0	0–1	2–1	0–0
Göztepe	3–0	0–1	1–0	4–1	1–1	2–0	1–1	2–2	0–2	1–1	—	1–1	5–0	3–0	2–0	3–0	2–2	3–2	2–1
Hatayspor	1–3	1–0	2–3	2–4	1–1	0–1	0–1	4–2	1–1	3–1	1–1	—	1–1	0–1	2–3	1–2	0–3	3–2	1–1
Kasımpaşa	2–2	2–1	0–0	2–3	1–1	0–0	2–0	0–2	3–3	2–2	1–2	5–4	—	1–2	2–3	3–2	1–4	3–1	1–1
Kayserispor	0–0	2–0	3–1	3–1	0–3	1–1	2–2	2–6	1–5	2–2	1–0	5–0	1–0	—	3–2	1–0	0–1	1–2	0–0
Konyaspor	3–1	1–2	1–1	3–2	1–0	3–1	2–1	2–3	1–2	1–0	1–0	1–1	3–3	0–0	—	2–1	0–1	0–0	1–0
Rizespor	3–2	3–1	2–1	1–1	1–1	0–2	1–0	0–5	1–2	2–0	6–3	5–2	0–1	3–0	1–1	—	0–1	1–1	3–1
Samsunspor	3–2	1–1	2–0	2–0	0–2	4–0	3–0	2–2	0–2	2–1	4–3	2–0	0–2	2–1	0–1	2–3	—	1–0	2–1
Sivasspor	5–1	1–1	2–0	1–2	0–2	0–0	0–1	1–3	2–3	3–2	3–1	3–2	0–0	5–2	1–1	2–1	0–0	—	0–0
Trabzonspor	5–0	4–3	5–0	1–0	1–1	1–0	1–0	2–3	0–2	3–2	1–1	1–2	2–2	2–2	3–2	2–0	2–2	4–0	—

Source: Turkish Football Federation (in Turkish)
Legend: Blue = home team win; Yellow = draw; Red = away team win.
For upcoming matches, an "a" indicates there is an article about the rivalry between the two participants.

== Number of teams by geographical region ==
Number	Region	Team(s)
6	Marmara	Başakşehir, Beşiktaş, Eyüpspor, Fenerbahçe, Galatasaray, and Kasımpaşa
4	Mediterranean	Adana Demirspor, Alanyaspor, Antalyaspor, and Hatayspor
3	Black Sea	Rizespor, Samsunspor, and Trabzonspor
3	Central Anatolia	Kayserispor, Konyaspor, and Sivasspor
2	Aegean	Bodrum and Göztepe
1	Southeastern Anatolia	Gaziantep

== Statistics ==
=== Top scorers ===
Rank	Player	Club(s)	Goals
1	(Nigeria) Victor Osimhen	Galatasaray	26
2	(Poland) Krzysztof Piątek	Başakşehir	21
3	(Morocco) Youssef En-Nesyri	Fenerbahçe	20
4	(Democratic Republic of the Congo) Simon Banza	Trabzonspor	19
4	(The Gambia) Ali Sowe	Çaykur Rizespor	19
6	(Italy) Ciro Immobile	Beşiktaş	15
6	(Senegal) Mame Thiam	Eyüpspor	15
8	(Bosnia and Herzegovina) Edin Džeko	Fenerbahçe	14
9	(Brazil) Rômulo Cardoso	Göztepe	13
9	(Cape Verde) Nuno da Costa	Kasımpaşa	13

=== Hat-tricks ===
Date	Player	For	Against	Result
25 August 2024	(Brazil) Fred	Fenerbahçe	Rizespor	5–0 (A)
1 September 2024	(Poland) Krzysztof Piątek	Başakşehir	Antalyaspor	5–2 (H)
3 November 2024	(Senegal) Alassane Ndao	Konyaspor	Başakşehir	3–2 (H)
25 November 2024	(Austria) Muhammed Cham	Trabzonspor	Adana Demirspor	5–0 (H)
12 January 2025	(Portugal) Pedro Malheiro	Trabzonspor	Antalyaspor	5–0 (H)
1 February 2025	(Poland) Krzysztof Piątek	Başakşehir	Samsunspor	4–0 (H)
14 March 2025	(Nigeria) Victor Osimhen	Galatasaray	Antalyaspor	4–0 (H)
6 April 2025	(Brazil) Talisca	Fenerbahçe	Trabzonspor	4–1 (H)
25 April 2025	(Italy) Ciro Immobile	Beşiktaş	Hatayspor	5–0 (H)
12 May 2025	(Portugal) Miguel Cardoso	Kayserispor	Antalyaspor	3–1 (H)

=== Clean sheets ===
Rank	Player	Club(s)	Clean sheets
1	(Turkey) Okan Kocuk	Samsunspor	14
2	(Turkey) Uğurcan Çakır	Trabzonspor	13
2	(Portugal) Diogo Sousa	Bodrum	13
4	(Uruguay) Fernando Muslera	Galatasaray	12
5	(Turkey) Mert Günok	Beşiktaş	11
6	(Turkey) Berke Özer	Eyüpspor	10
6	(Turkey) Muhammed Şengezer	Başakşehir	10
8	(Netherlands) Bilal Bayazıt	Kayserispor	9
9	(Croatia) Dominik Livaković	Fenerbahçe	8
9	(Turkey) Ertuğrul Taşkıran	Alanyaspor	8

== Awards ==
=== Annual awards ===
Award	Winner	Club
Manager of the Year	(Turkey) Okan Buruk	Galatasaray
Goalkeeper of the Year	(Turkey) Uğurcan Çakır	Trabzonspor
Striker of the Year	(Nigeria) Victor Osimhen	Galatasaray
Club President of the Year	(Turkey) Dursun Özbek	Galatasaray

Team of the Season
Goalkeeper	(Turkey) Uğurcan Çakır (Trabzonspor)			
Defence	(Democratic Republic of the Congo) Arthur Masuaku (Beşiktaş)	(Turkey) Abdülkerim Bardakcı (Galatasaray)	(Colombia) Davinson Sánchez (Galatasaray)	(Turkey) Zeki Yavru (Samsunspor)
Midfield	(Bosnia and Herzegovina) Haris Hajradinović (Kasımpaşa)	(Uruguay) Lucas Torreira (Galatasaray)	(Turkey) Barış Alper Yılmaz (Galatasaray)	(Portugal) Rafa Silva (Beşiktaş)
Attack	(Serbia) Dušan Tadić (Fenerbahçe)		(Nigeria) Victor Osimhen (Galatasaray)	

== Attendances ==
No.	Club	Average attendance	Change	Highest
1	Galatasaray SK	43,039	-0,2%	54,119
2	Fenerbahçe SK	33,571	-12,1%	44,283
3	Beşiktaş JK	28,393	20,0%	41,843
4	Trabzonspor	17,210	11,8%	36,347
5	Samsunspor	16,099	6,8%	33,021
6	Göztepe SK	15,212	-	17,868
7	Konyaspor	12,700	3,9%	28,290
8	Kayserispor	9,568	31,1%	16,490
9	Antalyaspor	7,996	-9,8%	19,349
10	Gaziantep FK	6,237	-24,0%	16,158
11	Sivasspor	5,957	43,7%	15,559
12	Çaykur Rizespor	5,871	15,0%	11,372
13	Adana Demirspor	5,173	-54,8%	14,165
14	Hatayspor	4,235	-27,2%	17,519
15	Alanyaspor	3,852	25,3%	7,996
16	Eyüpspor	2,648	-	7,237
17	Bodrum FK	2,588	-	3,856
18	İstanbul Başakşehir	2,433	-6,3%	7,914
19	Kasımpaşa SK	2,172	-12,1%	5,886

== See also ==
- 2024–25 TFF First League
- 2024–25 TFF Second League
- 2024–25 TFF Third League
- 2024–25 Turkish Cup
