= Recep Uçar =

Turkish footballer and manager

Personal information
- Date of birth: 22 September 1975 (age 51)
- Place of birth: Üsküdar, Turkey
- Height: 1.72 m (5 ft 8 in)
- Position: Right-back

Team information
- Current team: Çaykur Rizespor (head coach)

Youth career
- 1985–1999: Ümraniyespor
- 1989–1992: Pendikspor

Senior career*
Years	Team	Apps	(Gls)
1992–1998	Pendikspor	101	(23)
1998–2006	İstanbul BB	164	(10)
2006–2007	Pendikspor	45	(2)
2007–2008	İstanbul BB	0	(0)
Total		310	(35)

Managerial career
- 2020–2023: Ümraniyespor
- 2023–2024: Kayserispor
- 2024–2025: Konyaspor
- 2025–: Çaykur Rizespor
- * Club domestic league appearances and goals

Recep Uçar in 2016

Recep Uçar (born 22 September 1975) is a Turkish football manager and former professional defender who is the current head coach of Süper Lig club Çaykur Rizespor. After a playing career that included spells with Ümraniyespor, Pendikspor and İstanbul Büyükşehir Belediyespor, he transitioned into coaching in 2009 with İstanbul Başakşehir, initially serving as chief scout and later as an assistant manager.

Uçar began his senior managerial career with Ümraniyespor in 2020, leading the club to its first promotion to the Süper Lig. He later managed Kayserispor and Konyaspor before taking charge of Çaykur Rizespor in December 2025.

== Playing career ==
Uçar began playing football at the age of 10 with Ümraniyespor, before moving to Pendikspor at age 14. He started his senior career with Pendikspor in the TFF Second League, playing there for four seasons. During this period, he also pursued higher education, graduating with a degree in English Language and Literature.

In 1998, Uçar transferred to İstanbul Büyükşehir Belediyespor, a club then competing in the lower divisions of Turkish football. He quickly became a regular starter and later captained the side during their rise through the league system. Known for his discipline and tactical intelligence as a defender, Uçar played a pivotal role instabilizing the backline throughout his time at the club.

He returned to Pendikspor in 2006 for the final chapter of his playing career and retired in 2008 at the age of 31. In total, Uçar amassed over 300 professional appearances across all competitions during his career, playing primarily as a centre-back and right-back.

== Managerial career ==
=== Assistant coaching career ===
From 2013 to 2019, Uçar served as an assistant coach at İstanbul Başakşehir under manager Abdullah Avcı. During this six-year period, he was a key member of Avcı's technical staff as the club established itself as a title contender in the Süper Lig. Uçar described Avcı as a "role model" for his own coaching philosophy, citing Avcı's democratic approach and attention to detail. Following their tenure at Başakşehir, Uçar accompanied Avcı to Beşiktaş in 2019, continuing their collaboration as an assistant coach before eventually pursuing his own managerial career.

=== Ümraniyespor ===
On 25 October 2020, Uçar was appointed as the head coach of Ümraniyespor, marking his first managerial role after serving as an assistant under Abdullah Avcı for several years. In the 2021–22 season, he led the club to a second-place finish, securing their first-ever promotion to the Süper Lig in the club's history. Uçar parted ways with Ümraniyespor by mutual consent on 19 April 2023, with the team struggling in the relegation zone of the Süper Lig.

=== Kayserispor ===
Uçar was named the head coach of Kayserispor on 10 September 2023. Under his management, the team enjoyed a strong start to the 2023–24 Süper Lig season, climbing to third place in the standings after the first 12 weeks. However, following a series of poor results and a transfer ban affecting the squad depth, he left the club on 26 January 2024.

=== Konyaspor ===
On 1 November 2024, Uçar was appointed as the head coach of Konyaspor, taking over during the 11th week of the 2024–25 Süper Lig season. During his first season, he led the team to an 11th-place finish in the league with 46 points and guided them to the semi-finals of the Turkish Cup. In the following 2025–26 season, Konyaspor experienced a difficult run of form. On 3 November 2025, the club announced that they had mutually parted ways with Uçar following a 3–1 home defeat to Samsunspor. At the time of his departure, the team was in 8th place in the standings. Throughout his tenure at Konyaspor, Uçar managed the team in 37 league matches, recording 14 wins, 7 draws, and 16 losses.

=== Çaykur Rizespor ===
On 3 December 2025, Çaykur Rizespor officially announced the appointment of Recep Uçar as their new head coach, signing him to a 1.5-year contract. He replaced İlhan Palut, who had resigned from the position earlier that week. During the signing ceremony, club president İbrahim Turgut expressed confidence in Uçar's ability to improve the team's standing in the league.

== Managerial statistics ==
As of 21 November 2026

Team	From	To	Record				
Team	From	To	G	W	D	L	Win %
Ümraniyespor	28 October 2020	19 April 2023	97	42	22	33	43.30
Kayserispor	10 September 2023	27 January 2024	21	9	2	10	42.86
Konyaspor	31 October 2024	4 November 2025	45	20	8	17	44.44
Çaykur Rizespor	3 December 2025	Present	33	12	8	13	36.36
Total			196	83	40	73	42.35
