= Héliton =

Brazilian professional footballer

Personal information
- Full name: Héliton Jorge Tito dos Santos
- Date of birth: 13 November 1995 (age 30)
- Place of birth: Mauá, Brazil
- Height: 1.96 m (6 ft 5 in)
- Position: Defender

Team information
- Current team: Karlsruher SC
- Number: 4

Youth career
- –2013: Santo André

Senior career*
Years	Team	Apps	(Gls)
2014–2020	Santo André	25	(1)
2019	→ Figueirense (loan)	5	(0)
2020–2021	ABC	30	(5)
2021–2022	Covilhã	29	(4)
2022–2024	CSKA 1948	44	(6)
2024–2026	Göztepe	82	(2)
2026–	Karlsruher SC	0	(0)
- * Club domestic league appearances and goals as of 10 June 2026

Héliton Jorge Tito dos Santos (born 13 November 1995), also known as Héliton, is a Brazilian professional footballer who plays as a defender for 2. Bundesliga club Karlsruher SC.

== Career ==
In July 2023 Heliton joined Bulgarian First League team CSKA 1948. Becoming a main squad player, he was announced as the best player of the season for the team. For the 2023-24 season he become captain of the team.

On 9 January 2024 he signed with Göztepe for undisclosed fee.

On 1 September 2026, Héliton joined German club Karlsruher SC.

== Career statistics ==
Appearances and goals by club, season and competition
Club	Season	League			State league		National cup (Note: Includes Copa do Brasil, Taça de Portugal, Bulgarian Cup, Turkish Cup)		League cup (Note: Includes Taça da Liga)		Continental		Other		Total	
Club	Season	Division	Apps	Goals	Apps	Goals	Apps	Goals	Apps	Goals	Apps	Goals	Apps	Goals	Apps	Goals
Santo André	2013	Série D	0	0	0	0	0	0	—		—		1 (Note: Appearance(s) in Copa Paulista)	0	1	0
Santo André	2018	—			3 (Note: Appearance(s) in Campeonato Paulista Série A1)	0	—		—		—		16	0	19	0
Santo André	2019	—			19 (Note: Appearance(s) in Campeonato Paulista Série A2)	1	—		—		—		—		19	1
Santo André	2020	—			3	0	—		—		—		—		3	0
Santo André	Total		0	0	25	1	0	0	—		0	0	17	0	42	1
Figueirense (loan)	2019	Série B	5	0	0	0	0	0	—		—		—		5	0
ABC	2020	Série D	3	0	0	0	0	0	—		—		0	0	3	0
ABC	2021	Série D	3	1	16 (Note: Appearance(s) in Campeonato Potiguar)	4	4	0	—		—		8 (Note: Appearance(s) in Copa do Nordeste)	0	31	5
ABC	Total		6	1	16	4	4	0	—		0	0	8	0	34	5
Covilhã	2021-22	Liga Portugal 2	29	4	—		1	0	4	1	—		2 (Note: Appearance(s) in Liga Portugal 2 relegation play-offs)	0	36	5
CSKA 1948	2022-23	Bulgarian First League	27	4	—		5	0	—		—		0	0	32	4
CSKA 1948	2023-24	Bulgarian First League	18	2	—		1	0	—		2 (Note: Appearance(s) in UEFA Europa Conference League)	0	0	0	21	2
CSKA 1948	Total		45	6	—		6	0	—		2	0	0	0	53	6
Göztepe	2023-24	TFF First League	16	1	—		1	1	—		—		—		17	2
Göztepe	2024-25	Süper Lig	34	1	—		6	0	—		—		—		40	1
Göztepe	2025-26	Süper Lig	19	0	—		1	0	—		—		—		20	0
Göztepe	Total		69	2	—		8	1	—		0	0	0	0	77	3
Career total			149	13	41	5	19	1	4	1	2	0	27	0	242	20
