= İlhan Palut =

Turkish footballer and manager

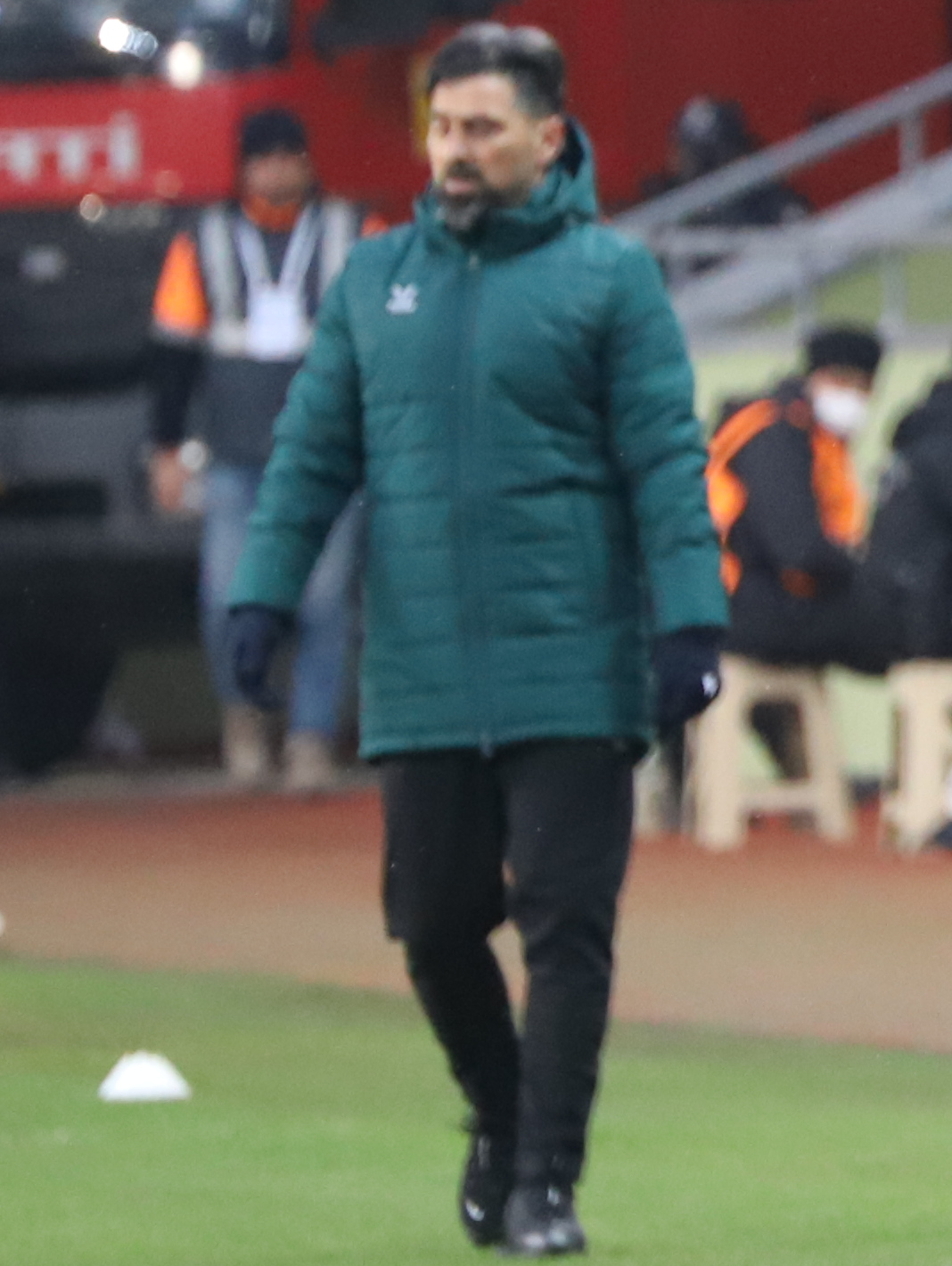
- Palut managing Konyaspor in 2021

Personal information
- Full name: İlhan Palut
- Date of birth: 12 November 1976 (age 50)
- Place of birth: Reyhanlı, Turkey
- Height: 1.76 m (5 ft 9 1/2 in)
- Position: Midfielder

Team information
- Current team: Konyaspor (head coach)

Senior career*
Years	Team	Apps	(Gls)
1996–2002	Hatayspor	149	(11)
2004–2006	Adana Demirspor	38	(2)
2006–2009	Hatayspor	48	(5)
2007–2008	→ Çorumspor (loan)	23	(1)
Total		258	(16)

Managerial career
- 2017–2019: Hatayspor
- 2019–2021: Göztepe
- 2021–2023: Konyaspor
- 2023–2025: Çaykur Rizespor
- 2026–: Konyaspor
- * Club domestic league appearances and goals as of 6 February 2026

İlhan Palut (Turkish pronunciation: [ilˈhan ˈpaɫut] (born 12 November 1976) is a Turkish football manager and former professional player who is currently serving as the head coach of Konyaspor. Primarily deployed as a midfielder during his playing career, Palut made a total of 338 professional appearances across four clubs, scoring 32 goals, and also gained experience representing Turkey at youth levels. Known for his preference for a 4–2–3–1 tactical structure, Palut has built a reputation for developing dynamic, high-pressing sides and promoting young domestic talent.

Palut first came to prominence in the Turkish football community through his successful spell with Hatayspor, guiding the club to the Süper Lig for the first time in its history. His work subsequently earned him his top-flight managerial debut with Göztepe, where his attacking approach and player development were widely praised. Over the following years, Palut established himself as one of the leading modern coaches in Turkey’s managerial landscape.

After concluding his playing career with Çorumspor, Palut transitioned into coaching as an assistant at Kırıkhanspor, beginning a steady rise through the Turkish football pyramid. His managerial career has included roles across the TFF First League and the Süper Lig, where he became known for stabilizing mid-table clubs and achieving competitive performances despite limited budgets.

Most recently, Palut was appointed head coach of Çaykur Rizespor in June 2023, leading the team through two consecutive 9th-place finishes in the Süper Lig before resigning in November 2025 following a series of poor results.

== Managerial career ==
=== Hatayspor ===
After an amateur career in Turkish football mostly with Hatayspor, Palut joined Hatayspor as the sporting director at the beginning of the 2016–17 season but later took on the role of coach during the half-time. Under his management, Hatayspor won the championship in the Second League at the end of the 2017–18 season and was promoted to the First League.

Although Hatayspor only earned four points in the first five weeks of the 2018–19 season in the First League, the team improved and made its way to the Süper Lig, finishing the season in third place and qualifying for the play-off matches. After eliminating Adana Demirspor in the play-off semi-finals, Hatayspor lost to Gaziantep on penalties in the final match, missing the chance to advance to the Süper Lig. In the same season, Hatayspor reached the quarter-finals of the Turkish Cup but was eliminated despite winning 4–2 after a 2–0 defeat in a first game against Galatasaray.

In the 2019–20 season, Hatayspor started the league with three wins in the first six weeks but was eliminated by Siirt İl Özel İdaresi in the 3rd Round of the Turkish Cup. On 1 October 2019, Due to the team's performance, Hatayspor and Palut parted ways.

=== Göztepe ===
On 5 November 2019, following a series of defeats, Tamer Tuna resigned as coach of Göztepe, and the management reached a three-year agreement with İlhan Palut to take over. On 11 January 2021, despite not achieving poor results, Palut resigned from his post by mutual agreement with the Göztepe management.

=== Konyaspor ===
on 10 February 2021 after İsmail Kartal's resignation following Beşiktaş's defeat, the management of Konyaspor signed a 1.5-year contract with coach İlhan Palut. Palut had a challenging start with Konyaspor in his first season, as the team was in a critical position in the league, but they managed to finish in 11th place. In the second season, he drew a successful strategy, and his team played impressive football, earning 68 points and finishing in the third place, which broke the club's record for the highest points collected in the Süper Lig during the 2021–22 season. Palut believes that despite their current position, they have made an acceptable start this season and his primary goal is to create a stable team identity for Konyaspor.

During his tenure, Palut led the team to 36 wins, 25 draws, and 20 losses in 81 games. He had the highest score average of 1.64 points among coaches who had managed Konyaspor for 15 or more games in the history of the Süper Lig. However, on 16 January 2023, Konyaspor, a football club, announced that they were terminating their contract with their coach, İlhan Palut. At the time of the announcement, Konyaspor had played a total of 18 matches in the league, winning 6, drawing 9, and losing 3. They were in 7th place in the league standings.

Ilhan Palut, who spoke after parting ways with Konyaspor, mentioned that he was informed about the decision to terminate his contract the previous day at noon. According to him, the club thanked him and said that a change in leadership would be beneficial for the team. Palut expressed that he and his team were surprised by the sudden decision, but they all agreed that it was for the best of the club. He also stated that he will make an official statement after receiving the termination certificate. On the same day, Konyaspor announced that they had appointed Serbian coach Aleksandar Stanojević as the new head of the team to replace İlhan Palut.

=== Çaykur Rizespor ===
On 13 June 2023, After Bülent Korkmaz's contract with Çaykur Rizespor came to an end, the club decided to appoint İlhan Palut as their new coach. In his first season in charge, Palut led Çaykur Rizespor to a 9th-place finish in the Süper Lig, with the team securing 14 wins, 8 draws, and 16 losses over 38 matches, finishing with 50 points and a goal difference of -10.

In the 2024–25 season, the team once again finished 9th in the league, recording 15 wins, 4 draws, and 17 losses in 36 matches, ending the campaign with 49 points and a goal difference of -6 (52 goals scored and 58 conceded). In the Turkish Cup, Rizespor competed in the group stage (Group A), where they finished 4th, earning 4 points from 1 win, 1 draw, and 1 loss, and failed to progress to the knockout rounds.

On 16 June 2025, Çaykur Rizespor announced that they had reached a one-year agreement with İlhan Palut to continue as the club’s head coach for the 2025–26 season. Having served in the role since 2023, Palut was praised by the club for his consistent leadership over the previous two years. The renewal was publicly welcomed by the club, which extended its congratulations to Palut and his technical staff.

On 29 November 2025, following a 1–0 defeat against Kayserispor, Palut submitted his resignation to the Çaykur Rizespor board immediately after the match. The decision came amid a run of poor results in the Süper Lig, with the team struggling to maintain consistency throughout the autumn period. After evaluating the club’s recent performances and overall direction, the board accepted Palut’s resignation, bringing an end to his tenure that had begun in June 2023.

On 29 November 2025, Palut resigned from his position as the head coach of Çaykur Rizespor following a 1–0 home defeat against Kayserispor in the Süper Lig. In his post-match statement, Palut explained his decision by stating that the team "needed a new voice" and a "new breath," emphasizing that while he did not typically step back from challenges, he believed a change was necessary for the club's benefit. The club's board accepted his resignation, thanking him for his service since June 2023. During his tenure, Palut managed the team for 96 official matches, recording 37 wins, 17 draws, and 42 losses.

=== Konyaspor (Second term) ===
On 6 February 2026, Palut returned to Konyaspor for his second spell as head coach, following the dismissal of Çağdaş Atan. He signed a one-and-a-half-year contract with the club, tasked with stabilizing the team after a ten-match winless streak in the Süper Lig.

== Career statistics ==
=== Club ===
Appearances and goals by club, season, and competition
Club	Season	League			National Cup		Total	
Club	Season	Division	Apps	Goals	Apps	Goals	Apps	Goals
Hatayspor	1996–97	2. Lig	7	1	–		7	1
Hatayspor	1997–98	2. Lig	31	3	1	0	32	3
Hatayspor	1998–99	2. Lig	30	2	–		30	2
Hatayspor	1999–2000	2. Lig	16	0	–		16	0
Hatayspor	2000–01	2. Lig	32	3	–		32	3
Hatayspor	2001–02	2. Lig	33	2	–		33	2
Hatayspor	Total		149	11	1	0	150	11
Adana Demirspor	2004–05	1. Lig	12	1	–		12	1
Adana Demirspor	2005–06	1. Lig	26	1	–		26	1
Adana Demirspor	Total		38	2	0	0	38	2
Hatayspor	2006–07	2. Lig	13	0	–		13	0
Hatayspor	2008–09	3. Lig	35	2	–		35	2
Hatayspor	Total		48	2	0	0	48	2
Çorumspor (loan)	2007–08	2. Lig	23	1	–		23	1
Çorumspor (loan)	Total		23	1	0	0	23	1
Career Total			258	16	1	0	259	16

=== Managerial statistics ===
As of 22 November 2026

Team	Nat	From	To	Record				
Team	Nat	From	To	G	W	D	L	Win %
Hatayspor	(Turkey)	1 February 2017	30 September 2019	104	60	26	18	57.69
Göztepe	(Turkey)	4 November 2019	10 January 2021	47	15	14	18	31.91
Konyaspor	(Turkey)	9 February 2021	17 January 2023	81	36	25	20	44.44
Çaykur Rizespor	(Turkey)	9 June 2023	30 November 2025	88	32	17	39	36.36
Konyaspor	(Turkey)	6 February 2026		29	11	5	13	37.93
Total				350	154	87	109	44.00

== Honours ==
=== Manager ===
Hatayspor

- TFF Second League: 2017–18

Konyaspor

- Süper Lig Third: 2021–22
