= Guilherme Luiz =

Brazilian footballer (born 2005)

Personal information
- Full name: Guilherme Luiz Oliveira da Silva
- Date of birth: 25 April 2005 (age 21)
- Place of birth: Pirapora, Brazil
- Height: 1.91 m (6 ft 3 in)
- Position: Forward

Team information
- Current team: Radomiak Radom (on loan from Göztepe)
- Number: 80

Youth career
- 2023: Cruzeiro
- 2023–2025: Boston City Brasil
- 2024: → São-Carlense (loan)
- 2024–2025: → Ceará (loan)

Senior career*
Years	Team	Apps	(Gls)
2023–2025	Boston City Brasil	1	(0)
2025	→ Ceará (loan)	9	(1)
2025	Ceará	3	(0)
2026–	Göztepe	13	(0)
2026–	→ Radomiak Radom (loan)	0	(0)
- * Club domestic league appearances and goals as of 10 June 2026

Guilherme Luiz Oliveira da Silva (born 25 April 2005), known as Guilherme Luiz, Guilherme Olyver or just Guilherme, is a Brazilian professional footballer who plays as a forward for Ekstraklasa club Radomiak Radom, on loan from Göztepe.

== Career ==
On 1 November 2022, Guilherme signed a youth contract with Cruzeiro, being initially assigned to the under-17 team. On 13 September 2023, after just two appearances in the under-20 squad, he was released, and subsequently joined Boston City Brasil, where he would make his senior debut in the Campeonato Mineiro Segunda Divisão.

Guilherme played the 2024 Copa São Paulo de Futebol Júnior on loan at São-Carlense, and subsequently joined Ceará also in a temporary deal on 28 February 2024. Promoted to the latter's first team in the following year, he made his debut with the main squad on 30 January 2025, coming on as a late substitute for João Victor in a 1–0 Campeonato Cearense home win over Iguatu, and scored his first goal three days later by netting his side's third in a 5–0 home routing of Barbalha.

Guilherme made his Série A debut on 15 April 2025; after replacing Aylon, he assisted Pedro Raul in the club's second goal of a 2–1 home win over Vasco da Gama. On 24 May, Ceará exercised the buyout clause on his loan deal, purchasing 50% of his economic rights for a fee of R$ 400,000; the player signed a permanent deal until 2028.

On 4 January 2026, Guilherme was sold to Turkish side Göztepe of the Süper Lig for a rumoured fee of R$ 9 million. On 27 August 2026, he joined Polish club Radomiak Radom on loan with an option to buy.

== Career statistics ==
As of match played 16 May 2026

Appearances and goals by club, season and competition
Club	Season	League			State league (Note: Includes Campeonato Cearense)		National cup (Note: Includes Copa do Brasil)		Continental		Other		Total	
Club	Season	Division	Apps	Goals	Apps	Goals	Apps	Goals	Apps	Goals	Apps	Goals	Apps	Goals
Boston City Brasil	2023	Mineiro Segunda Divisão	—		1	0	—		—		—		1	0
Ceará	2025	Série A	7	0	5	1	1	0	—		9 (Note: Four appearances in Copa do Nordeste, five appearances and one goal in Copa Fares Lopes)	0	22	2
Göztepe	2025–26	Süper Lig	13	0	—		—		—		—		13	0
Radomiak Radom (loan)	2026–27	Ekstraklasa	0	0	—		0	0	—		—		0	0
Career total			20	0	6	1	1	0	0	0	9	1	36	2

== Honours ==
Ceará

- Campeonato Cearense: 2025
