= Orhan Ak =

Turkish footballer

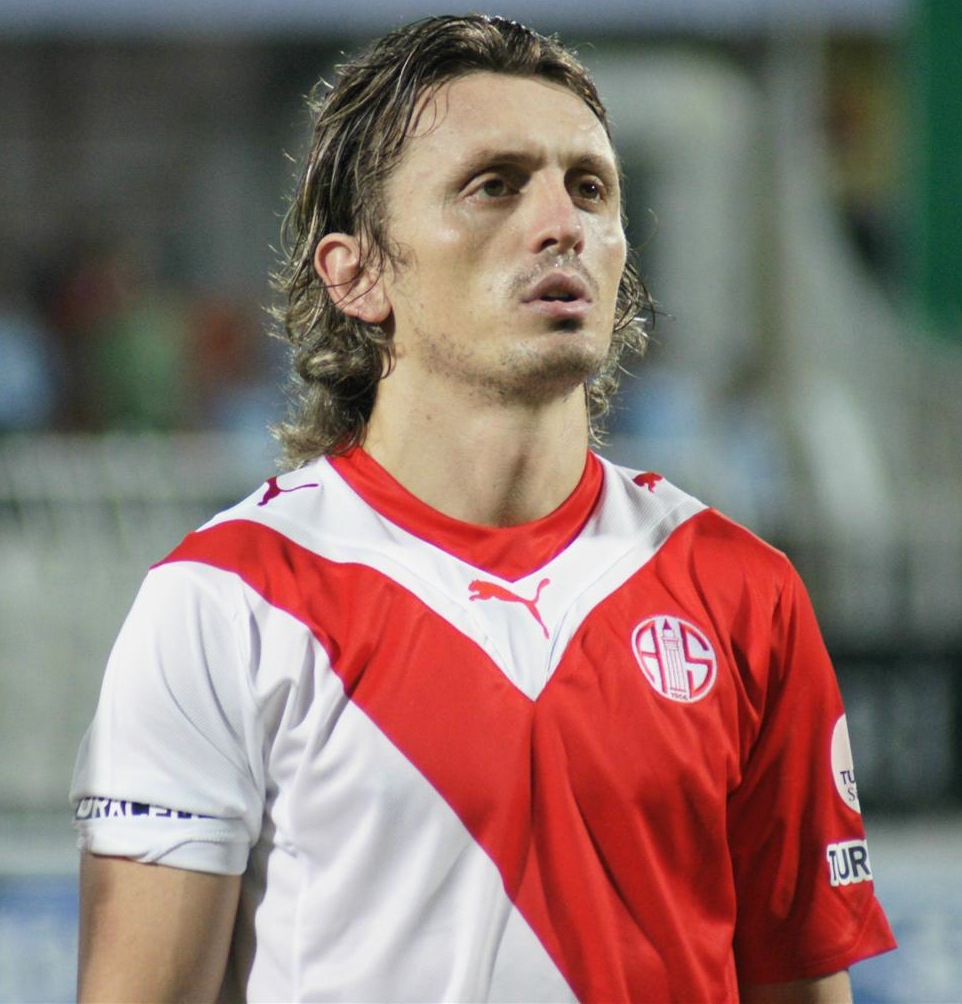
- Ak with Antalyaspor

Personal information
- Date of birth: 29 September 1979 (age 47)
- Place of birth: Adapazarı, Sakarya, Turkey
- Height: 1.79 m (5 ft 10 in)
- Position: Defender

Senior career*
Years	Team	Apps	(Gls)
1996–2003	Kocaelispor	77	(0)
1998–1999	→ Kuşadasıspor (loan)	17	(2)
2003–2008	Galatasaray	81	(5)
2007–2008	→ Ankaraspor (loan)	12	(0)
2008–2010	Antalyaspor	36	(4)
2010–2011	Bucaspor	17	(3)
2011–2012	Boluspor	13	(1)
2012–2013	Elazığspor	25	(0)
2013–2015	Başakşehir	1	(0)

International career
1997	Turkey U17	5	(1)
1997	Turkey U18	6	(2)
2000–2001	Turkey U21	11	(1)
2003	Turkey A2	1	(0)
2004–2006	Turkey	3	(0)

Managerial career
- 2018–2019: Başakşehir (assistant)
- 2019: Beşiktaş (assistant)
- 2020–2023: Trabzonspor (assistant)
- 2023: Trabzonspor (interim)
- 2025: Fatih Karagümrük
- 2025–2026: Eyüpspor
- 2026: Gaziantep
- * Club domestic league appearances and goals

Orhan Ak (born 29 September 1979) is a Turkish football manager and former professional player who played as a left back or a central defender. He last managed Gaziantep.

== Club career ==
Orhan Ak began his professional career with Kocaelispor in 1996. He played for the club until 2003, totaling 77 appearances for the club, as well as several caps for various levels of youth international teams. He also spent the 1998–99 season on loan at Kuşadasıspor. Galatasaray transferred him before the start of the 2003–04 season. He spent five years with the club before he was shipped off to Antalyaspor. He also spent one season on loan at Ankaraspor. During his tenure with Galatasaray, Ak won a Süper Lig title and a Turkish Cup, as well as caps for the Turkey national football team. Bucaspor transferred him in 2010.

== International career ==
Orhan Ak's international career began at the U-15 level. He was called up for two friendlies against Germany, but did not play. He has been capped at U-17, U-18, and U-21 level as well. He has won three caps with Turkey.

== Honors ==
Kocaelispor

- Turkish Cup: 2001–02

Galatasaray

- Süper Lig: 2005–06
- Turkish Cup: 2004–05
