= Metin Diyadin =

Turkish footballer and manager

Personal information
- Date of birth: 16 February 1968 (age 58)
- Place of birth: Trabzon, Turkey
- Height: 1.70 m (5 ft 7 in)
- Position: Midfielder

Senior career*
Years	Team	Apps	(Gls)
1988–1998	Gençlerbirliği	232	(20)
1994–1995	→ Denizlispor (loan)	24	(3)
1998–2000	Fenerbahçe	42	(4)
2000–2002	Göztepe	48	(8)
2002–2003	Kayserispor	4	(0)
Total		350	(35)

Managerial career
- 2005–2007: Gençlerbirliği OFTAŞ
- 2007–2008: Eskişehirspor
- 2008: Çaykur Rizespor
- 2009: Trabzonspor (assistant)
- 2011: Orduspor
- 2012: Kasımpaşa
- 2013: Gençlerbirliği
- 2014–2016: Göztepe
- 2016–2017: Gazişehir Gaziantep
- 2017–2018: Giresunspor
- 2019: Ankaragücü
- 2021: Bandırmaspor
- 2021–2022: Gençlerbirliği
- 2023–2024: Iğdır
- 2025–2026: Gençlerbirliği
- 2026: Gençlerbirliği
- * Club domestic league appearances and goals

Metin Diyadin (born 16 February 1968) is a Turkish football manager and retired player.

== Football career ==
Born in Trabzon, Turkey on 16 February 1968. He started football (soccer) at his hometown club, Trabzonspor and continued to play with the junior team until he was 19 years old. Later same year he signed his first professional contract with Gençlerbirliği S.K. where he played for the next 10 years from 1988 to 1998. He was loaned by Denizlispor for the 1994–1995 season. When he was 29 years old, he signed with Fenerbahce S.K., among the top 4 clubs in Turkish premier soccer league. He served in the mid-field as the captain and the pivot for 2 seasons. He was attacked by Fenerbahce fans after losing 2–1 against Pendikspor of the first soccer division. After that, he played for Goztepe for the next 2 seasons, 2000–2002 and his last season was with Kayserispor until a tragic injury ended his career. The mid-fielder played in 284 official games and scored 32 goals.

== Managerial career ==
Diyadin was the assistant coach of the Belgian technical trainer Hugo Broos at Trabzonspor SK, which is among the top 4 clubs in Turkish premier soccer league. Prior to that, he served as the coach for Hacettepe, Eskişehirspor, Çaykur Rizespor. In September 2019, he was appointed as manager of MKE Ankaragücü.

== Achievements ==
As player

Fenerbahçe

- 1 Atatürk Cup : 1998

As manager

Gençlerbirliği OFTAŞ

- 1 TFF First League champions : 2006–07

Orduspor

- 1 TFF First League champions : 2010–11

Kasımpaşa

- 1 TFF First League champions : 2011–12
