= İstikbal =

Turkish furniture retailer

İstikbal Furniture S.A.
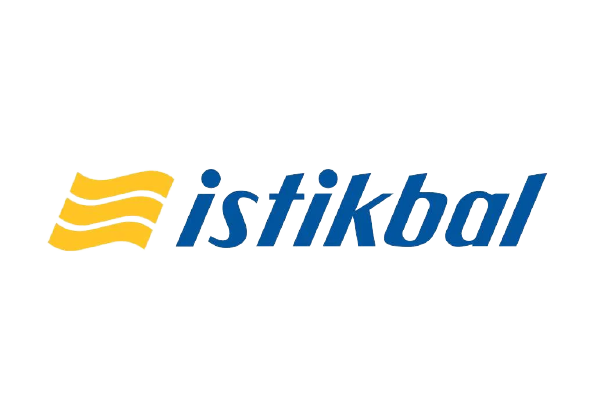
- Type: Anonim şirket
- Founded: 1957
- Headquarters: Kayseri, Turkey
- Owner: Paşalı Grup

İstikbal Furniture S.A. (Turkish: İstikbal Mobilya A.Ş) is a Turkish furniture retailer that was founded by Hacı Boydak. In 2016, Boydak Holding was found affiliated with FETÖ, and the company was seized by SDIF (TMSF). On May 16, 2026, it was sold by the SDIF (TMSF) to the Izmir-based Paşalı Grup for 16.5 billion TL; it officially separated from Erciyes Anadolu Holding in August 2026 and transitioned to the Paşalı Grup.

Istikbal was founded in 1957 in a small carpenter's workshop in Kayseri. The small workshop catered to the newly developing apartment and urban living by delivering functional home furniture. Soon the workshop moved into a factory and expanded its production to include a wide range of living rooms, bedrooms, dining rooms, mattresses and bases.
