= İsmet Taşdemir =

Turkish footballer

Personal information
- Date of birth: 1 January 1974 (age 52)
- Place of birth: Iğdır, Turkey
- Height: 1.80 m (5 ft 11 in)

Team information
- Current team: Sivasspor (head coach)

Senior career*
Years	Team	Apps	(Gls)
1989–1992	Ümraniyespor		
1992–1995	Denizlispor		
1995–1996	İstanbulspor		
1995–1996	→ Kayserispor (loan)		
1996–2000	Samsunspor		
2000–2003	Ankaragücü		
2003	Denizlispor		
2004	Ankaragücü		
2004–2005	Akçaabat Sebatspor		
2005–2006	Ankaragücü		
2006	İstanbulspor		
2006–2007	Mardinspor		
2007–2010	Türk Telekom		

Managerial career
- 2010: Sivasspor (assistant)
- 2011–2012: Türk Telekom
- 2012: Samsunspor (assistant)
- 2012–2013: Karabükspor (assistant)
- 2013–2014: Konyaspor (assistant)
- 2015–2016: Kocaeli Birlik Spor
- 2016–2017: Ankaragücü
- 2017: Bugsaşspor
- 2017–2018: Altay
- 2018: Ümraniyespor
- 2019: Samsunspor
- 2019–2020: Osmanlıspor
- 2020: Ankaraspor
- 2020–2021: Çorum
- 2021–2024: Bodrum
- 2024–2025: Kocaelispor
- 2025: Gaziantep
- 2026: Sivasspor
- * Club domestic league appearances and goals

İsmet Taşdemir (born 1 January 1974) is a Turkish football manager.

== Managerial career ==
On 25 December 2024 Kocaelispor signed a 1.5-year contract with Taşdemir for the position of head coach.

== Honours ==
Kocaelispor

- TFF First League: 2024–25
