= Çağdaş Atan =

Turkish footballer

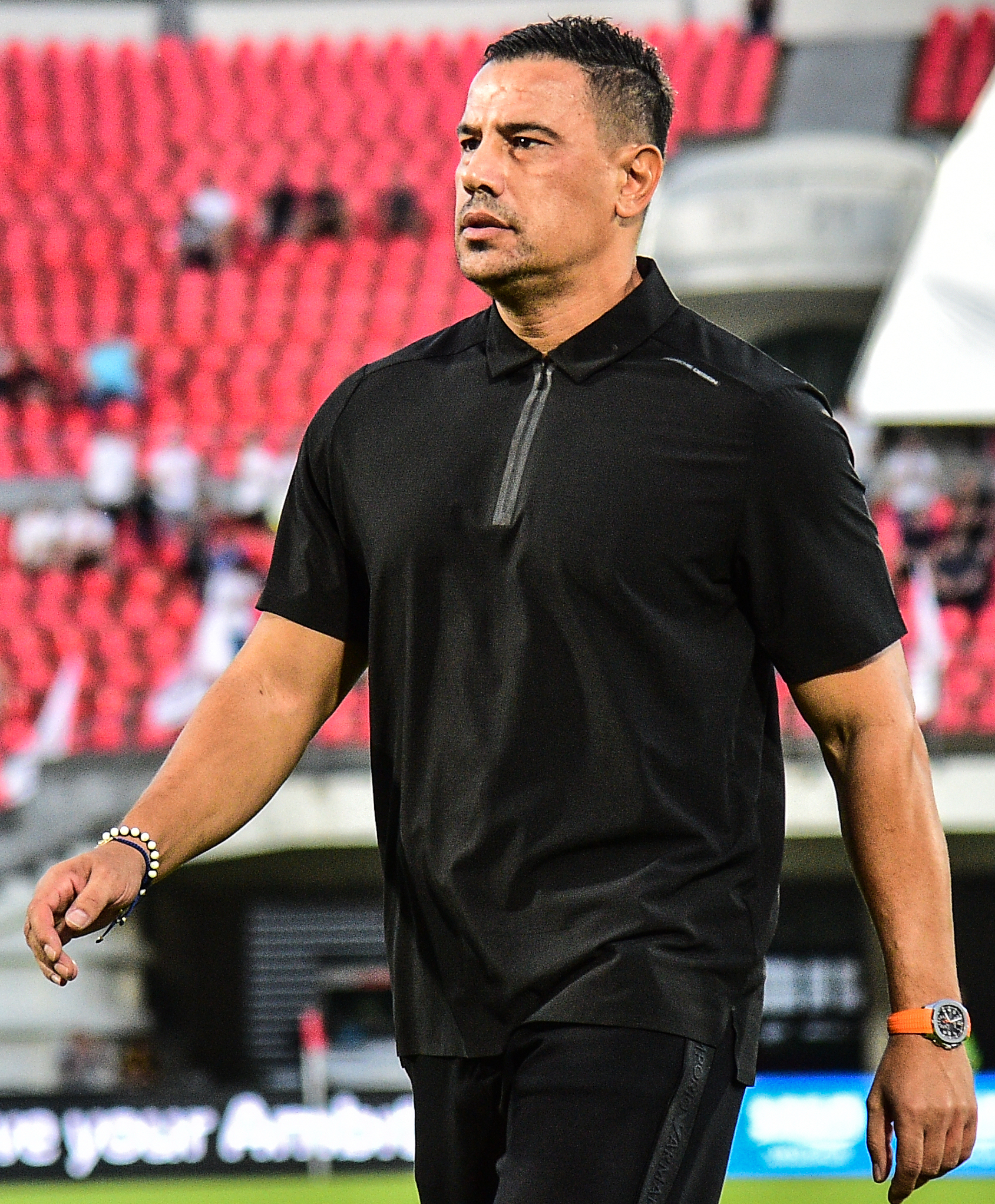
- Atan in 2024

Personal information
- Full name: Çağdaş Atan
- Date of birth: 29 February 1980 (age 46)
- Place of birth: İzmir, Turkey
- Height: 1.87 m (6 ft 2 in)
- Position: Central defender

Youth career
- 1999–2000: Altay

Senior career*
Years	Team	Apps	(Gls)
2000–2001	Marmaris	28	(7)
2001–2003	Altay	54	(4)
2003–2004	Denizlispor	30	(3)
2004–2006	Beşiktaş	40	(2)
2006–2008	Trabzonspor	41	(5)
2008–2009	Energie Cottbus	20	(2)
2009–2011	Basel	44	(1)
2011–2012	Mersin İdman Yurdu	26	(0)
2012–2014	Akhisarspor	57	(1)
2014–2015	Gaziantep BB	13	(0)
2015	Manisaspor	12	(0)
Total		365	(25)

International career
2003–2004	Turkey B	3	(1)
2004	Turkey	2	(1)

Managerial career
- 2020–2021: Alanyaspor
- 2022–2023: Kayserispor
- 2023–2025: Başakşehir
- 2025–2026: Konyaspor
- * Club domestic league appearances and goals

Çağdaş Atan (Turkish pronunciation: [ˈtʃaːdaʃ ˈatan]; born 29 February 1980) is a Turkish football coach and former player who played primarily as a central defender.

Atan began his career in the youth ranks of Altay and Marmaris Belediyespor, before establishing himself in senior football with Denizlispor in the early 2000s. His performances then earned moves to Turkish top-tier sides Beşiktaş and Trabzonspor. In 2009, Atan signed with Basel in the Swiss Super League, where he won successive league titles and appeared in UEFA Champions League group-stage matches. He later returned to Turkey to play for Mersin İdmanyurdu, Akhisarspor, Gaziantep BB, and Manisaspor, ultimately retiring from playing in 2015.

Internationally, Atan earned his first cap for the Turkey national team in 2004 and marked the occasion by scoring in a friendly against Croatia. He also featured for Turkey’s U21 side earlier in his career.

After hanging up his boots, Atan moved into coaching. He started as an assistant manager at Alanyaspor before being promoted to head coach in 2020. He guided the club to a historic 5th-place finish in the 2019–20 Süper Lig, securing their first-ever qualification for European competition. In 2022, he took charge of Kayserispor, leading them to respectable mid-table finishes in Turkey’s top division.

Atan’s managerial reputation grew with his move to Başakşehir in 2023, where he earned a contract extension in May 2025. However, after an underwhelming start to the 2025–26 season, the club and Atan mutually agreed to part ways in September 2025.

== Club career ==
=== Early career ===
Atan began his career with Altay before moving to Marmaris, where he signed his first professional contract, in 2000. He returned to Altay in 2001 and played for two seasons. After that, he signed for Denizlispor and Beşiktaş On 1 June 2006, he transferred to Trabzonspor, based in the Black Sea port city of Trabzon.

In the summer of 2008 Atan signed a two-year contract with German club FC Energie Cottbus. But because the team suffered relegateion he stayed with the club just one season. After their relegation Energie Cottbus had made Atan an offer for the 2. Bundesliga, but the financial ideas of the two sides were too far apart.

=== Basel ===
On 25 June 2009 it was announced that Atan had joined FC Basel on a free transfer. He joined Basel's first team in advance of their 2009–10 season under head coach Thorsten Fink. After playing in three test games, Atan played his domestic league debut for the club in the away game in the Kybunpark on 12 July 2009 as Basel won 1–0 against St. Gallen. He scored his first goal for his new club in the home game in the St. Jakob-Park on 20 February 2010. It was the winning goal of the match as Basel won 2–1 against Aarau. Basel joined the 2009–10 UEFA Europa League in the second qualifying round. Basel advanced to the group stage, in which despite winning three of the six games the ended in third position and were eliminated. They finished four points behind group winners Roma and one behind Fulham, against whom they lost 3–2 in the last game of the stage. Atan played the full 90 minutes. At the end of the 2009–10 season he won the Double with his club. They won the League Championship title with 3 points advantage over second placed Young Boys. The team won the Swiss Cup, winning the final 6–0 against Lausanne-Sport.

Basel started in the 2010–11 UEFA Champions League third qualifying round and advanced to the group stage, but ended the group in third position. Therefore, they dropped to the 2010–11 Europa League knockout phase, but here they were eliminated by Spartak Moscow. Atan played in six of the 10 Champions League matches, scoring a goal in the qualification game against Hungarian team Debrecen. He also played in 10 of the 18 domestic league matches in the first half of the season, however, in the second half of the season he was no longer considered by head coach Fink. With Basel, Atan won his second Swiss Championship at the end of the 2010–11 season.

The club decided not to extend Atan's contract. In his two seasons with the club, Atan played a total of 92 games for Basel scoring a total of four goals. 44 of these games were in the Swiss Super League, five in the Swiss Cup, 16 in the UEFA competitions and 27 were friendly games. He scored one goal in the domestic league, one in the Champions League and the other two were scored during the test games.

=== 2011–2015: Later career ===
On 18 August 2011, it was announced tha Atan had joined the Turkish club Mersin İdman Yurdu, which had been promoted to the Süper Lig in the previous season. After just one season with Mersin İdman Yurdu, he left the club and moved within the league to newly promoted Akhisar Belediyespor. Unable to reach an agreement for a contract extension with his club during the summer, Atan moved to the second-tier team Gaziantep BB. However, he left Gaziantep BB during the next mid-season and instead joined league rival Manisaspor. Following the 2014–15 season, he retired from his career.

== International career ==
On 18 February 2004 Çağdaş wore the Turkey national team jersey for the first time in a match against Denmark.On 31 March 2004, he scored his first national team goal in a friendly match against Croatia. He also played for the Turkey national under-21 football team 3 times and scored 1 goal.

== Managerial career ==
=== Early career ===
In 2016 Atan started several tenures as assistant manager under Sergen Yalçın in various clubs. In 2020, he had the opportunity to take charge of a football team for the first time and became the head coach of Alanyaspor. During his tenure, he successfully managed the team, finishing the 2020–21 Süper Lig season in 7th place.

On 15 June 2022, he continued his managerial career by signing with Kayserispor. In his first season he led Kayserispor to finish the Süper Lig season under his leadership in 9th place. With his football knowledge and managerial abilities, Atan is considered as one of the important figures in Turkish football. In the 2023–24 season, Kayserispor made a promising start by securing one win and three draws in their first four matches under the guidance of Atan. However, the team faced a challenge as the transfer window remained closed since the season's commencement. Atan consistently communicated his concerns to the club's board about the team's unaddressed transfer needs. On 6 September 2023 following the closure of the transfer window, Atan officially announced his departure from Kayserispor via a statement posted on social media.

=== Başakşehir ===
On 9 September 2023, After Emre Belözoğlu's departure, Başakşehir announced the appointment of Atan as the new manager. On 11 September 2023, Atan signed an official contract with a duration of 2+1 years with the Başakşehir. Atan took charge of a team facing significant challenges, as they were positioned at the bottom of the league table in 19th place and had not recorded any wins at the time of his appointment.

Despite this difficult start, Atan implemented strategic changes and effectively motivated the squad, leading to a remarkable turnaround in the team's performance. By the end of the season, Başakşehir finished in 4th place in the league, demonstrating Atan's managerial capabilities. This impressive rise not only secured the team a spot in the UEFA Conference League second qualifying round but also marked a successful campaign, laying a foundation for future growth.

In the 2024–25 season, Atan led Başakşehir into European competitions for the second consecutive year. The club successfully advanced through the UEFA Conference League qualifying rounds, defeating La Fiorita (10–1 aggregate), Iberia 1999 (3–0 aggregate), and St Patrick’s Athletic (2–0 aggregate), reaching the league phase. Despite a strong start, Başakşehir struggled in the league phase, finishing 26th overall. Domestically, the team secured 5th place in the Süper Lig with 54 points, earning another shot at European qualification. In the Turkish Cup, Başakşehir competed in Group C, finishing 3rd behind Konyaspor and Galatasaray, although level on points and goal difference with Galatasaray, they narrowly missed out on progression due to the fair play rule, having received one more yellow card.

Atan’s second season demonstrated his consistency in guiding the club to European stages, while also reinforcing its competitive standing in Turkish football. On 29 May 2025 Recognizing the consistent progress under Atan’s leadership, the club announced that the club extended Atan’s contract for two more years. The signing ceremony, marking the extension of his tenure, was held with the participation of club president Gümüşdağ, board members, and players. Under Atan, Başakşehir has continued to strengthen its institutional structure and competitive presence in both domestic and European football.

After renewing his contract for two years on 29 May 2025, Çağdaş Atan faced a challenging start to the 2025–26 season. In European competition, Başakşehir first reached the third qualifying round of the UEFA Conference League, defeating Cherno More 5–0 on aggregate (4–0, 1–0), and then overcame Viking 4–2 on aggregate (1–1, 3–1). However, they were eliminated in the play-off round after suffering a 2–5 aggregate defeat to CS Universitatea Craiova—losing 1–2 at home and 1–3 away.

The first leg against CS Universitatea Craiova ended in a 1–2 home defeat at Fatih Terim Stadium. Following a 1–3 defeat in the return leg held in Romania (3–1 on the night; 5–2 aggregate), Basaksehir’s European campaign came to an abrupt end.

On 8 September 2025, Başakşehir announced that it had mutually terminated its contract with Atan. In the club’s statement, Başakşehir thanked Atan for his professionalism and for leading the team to European competitions in back-to-back seasons, and wished him success in the next stage of his career.

== Career statistics ==
=== Club ===
Appearances and goals by club, season and competition
Club	Season	League			Cup		Continental (Note: Appearances in the UEFA Champions League and UEFA Europa League/UEFA Cup)		Total	
Club	Season	Division	Apps	Goals	Apps	Goals	Apps	Goals	Apps	Goals
Marmaris	2000–01	3. Lig	28	7	0	0	—		28	7
Marmaris	Total		28	7	0	0	0	0	28	7
Altay	2001–02	1. Lig	24	1	2	0	—		26	1
Altay	2002–03	Süper Lig	30	3	3	0	—		33	3
Altay	Total		54	4	3	0	0	0	57	4
Denizlispor	2003–04	Süper Lig	32	2	3	0	—		35	2
Denizlispor	Total		32	2	3	0	0	0	35	2
Beşiktaş	2004–05	Süper Lig	20	1	2	0	3	0	25	1
Beşiktaş	2005–06	Süper Lig	20	1	7	0	5	0	32	1
Beşiktaş	Total		40	2	10	0	8	0	58	2
Trabzonspor	2006–07	Süper Lig	20	4	4	0	1	0	25	4
Trabzonspor	2007–08	Süper Lig	21	1	3	0	—		24	1
Trabzonspor	Total		41	4	7	0	1	0	49	2
Energie Cottbus	2008–09	Bundesliga	30	2	2	0	—		32	2
Energie Cottbus	Total		30	2	2	0	0	0	32	2
Basel	2009–10	Super League	34	1	3	0	10	0	47	1
Basel	2010–11	Super League	10	0	2	0	6	0	18	0
Basel	Total		44	1	5	0	16	0	65	1
Mersin İdman Yurdu	2011–12	Süper Lig	26	0	1	0	—		27	1
Mersin İdman Yurdu	Total		26	0	1	0	0	0	27	1
Akhisarspor	2012–13	Süper Lig	31	1	0	0	—		31	1
Akhisarspor	2013–14	Süper Lig	26	0	6	0	—		32	9
Akhisarspor	Total		57	1	6	0	0	0	63	1
Gaziantep BB	2014–15	1. Lig	13	0	0	0	—		13	0
Gaziantep BB	Total		13	0	0	0	0	0	13	0
Manisaspor	2014–15	1. Lig	12	0	0	0	—		12	0
Manisaspor	Total		12	0	0	0	0	0	12	0
Career total			374	23	37	0	25	0	436	23

=== International ===
Appearances and goals by national team and year
National team	Year	Apps	Goals
Turkey	2004	1	0
Total		2	1

Scores and results list Turkey's goal tally first, score column indicates score after each Atan goal.

List of international goals scored by Çağdaş Atan
No.	Date	Venue	Opponent	Score	Result	Competition
1	31 March 2004	Stadion Maksimir, Zagreb, Croatia	Croatia	2–2	2–2	Friendly

== Managerial Statistics ==
As of 31 January 2026

Team	From	To	Record				
Team	From	To	G	W	D	L	Win %
Alanyaspor	12 August 2020	2 September 2021	47	21	8	18	44.68
Kayserispor	15 June 2022	6 September 2023	43	18	8	17	41.86
Başakşehir	9 September 2023	8 September 2025	98	46	23	29	46.94
Konyaspor	6 November 2025	4 February 2026	12	3	5	4	25.00
Total			200	88	44	68	44.00

== Honours ==
=== Player ===
==== Beşiktaş ====
- Turkish Cup (1): 2005–06

==== Basel ====
- Swiss Super League (1): 2009–10
- Swiss Cup (1): 2009–10
