= Sami Uğurlu =

Turkish footballer and manager

Personal information
- Date of birth: 27 April 1978 (age 48)
- Place of birth: İzmir, Turkey
- Position: Defender

Youth career
- 1995–1996: İzmirspor

Senior career*
Years	Team	Apps	(Gls)
1996–1997	İzmirspor	0	(0)
1998–1999	Galatasaray U21	0	(0)
1999–2000	Yozgatspor	21	(3)
2000–2001	Kardemir Karabükspor	0	(0)
2001–2003	İzmirspor	38	(1)
2003–2004	Fatih Karagümrük	0	(0)
2004–2005	Muğlaspor	0	(0)
2005–2006	Şanlıurfaspor	0	(0)
2006–2007	Aydınspor	0	(0)
Total		59	(4)

Managerial career
- 2021–2022: Kasımpaşa
- 2023: Bandırmaspor
- 2023–2024: Kasımpaşa
- 2024–2025: Alanyaspor
- 2026: Antalyaspor
- * Club domestic league appearances and goals

Sami Uğurlu (born 27 April 1978) is a Turkish football manager and former player.

== Managerial career ==
Uğurlu had an unassuming playing career with Yozgatspor, Kardemir Karabükspor and İzmirspor in the TFF First League. After retiring as a player, he began as a youth coach at Altınordu. He move to Kasımpaşa as an assistant, and in December 2021 was appointed the head coach.

On 20 May 2022, Uğurlu signed a 3-year contract with Kasımpaşa after collecting 39 points in his first 20 games with the club. On November 29, 2023, he was reappointed as the head coach of Kasımpaşa. On November 6, 2024, he left his position at the club by mutual agreement.

On November 7, 2024, Uğurlu was appointed as the head coach of Alanyaspor, following the resignation of Fatih Tekke. At the signing ceremony held at Cengiz Aydoğan Facilities, Uğurlu expressed his belief that Alanyaspor’s club structure and his coaching philosophy were well-aligned. He emphasized his commitment to contributing to the club’s development and achieving success. On March 20, 2025, Alanyaspor announced that they had parted ways with Uğurlu.

On 2 January 2026, Antalyaspor announced that they had signed Sami Uğurlu on a contract running until the end of the 2025–2026 season.

== Managerial statistics ==
As of 17 May 2026

Managerial record by team and tenure
Team	Nat	From	To	Record					Ref
Team	Nat	From	To	G	W	D	L	Win %	Ref
Kasımpaşa	(Turkey)	20 December 2021	16 August 2022	25	14	3	8	56.00	
Bandırmaspor	(Turkey)	10 March 2023	23 May 2023	13	6	3	4	46.15	
Kasımpaşa	(Turkey)	28 November 2023	6 November 2024	38	15	10	13	39.47	
Alanyaspor	(Turkey)	7 November 2024	20 March 2025	21	9	4	8	42.86	
Antalyaspor	(Turkey)	2 January 2026	30 June 2026	20	4	5	11	20.00	
Total				117	48	25	44	41.03	—
