= Uludağ Gazoz =

Turkish soft drink

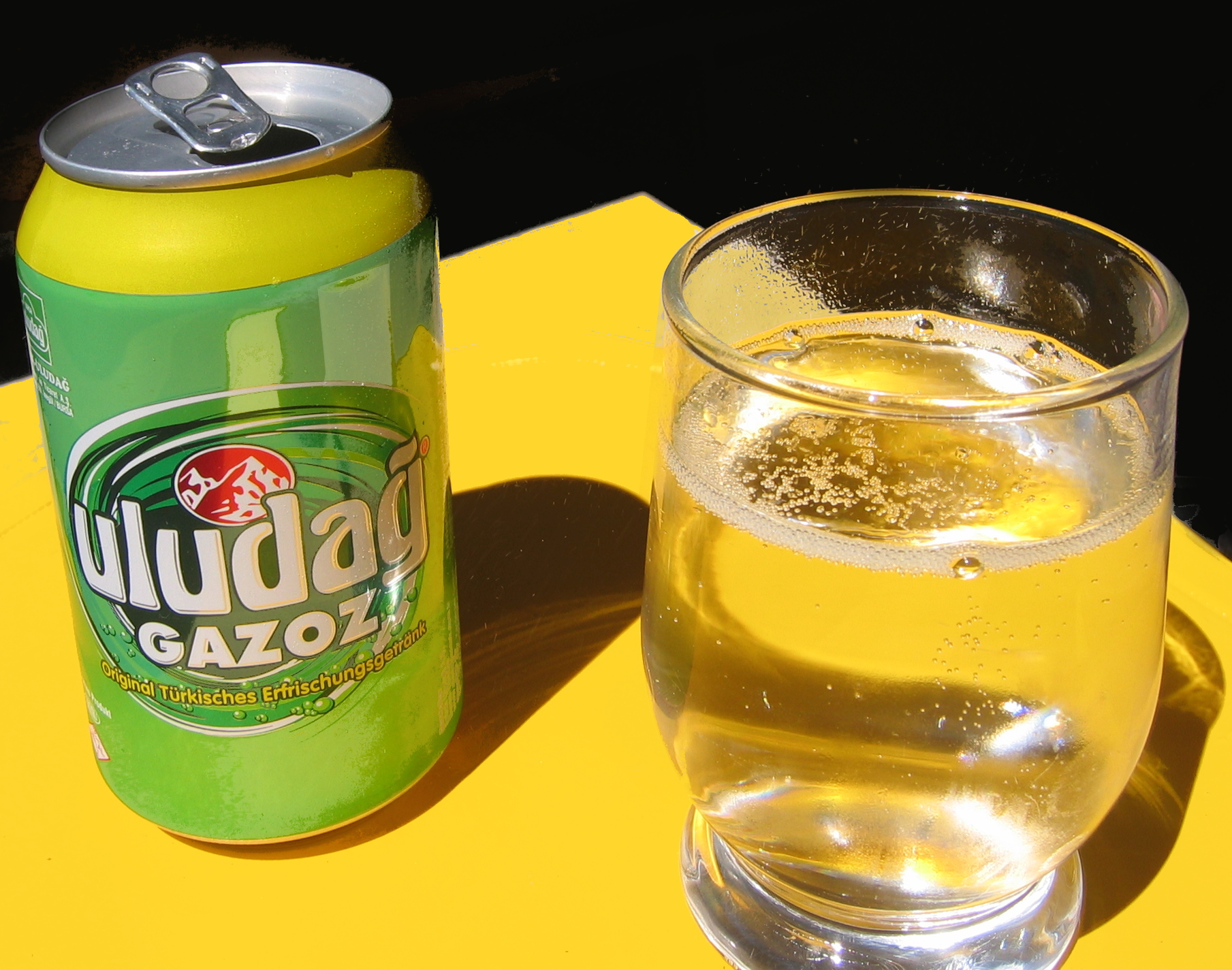
- German version of Uludağ Gazoz
- Type: Lemon-lime
- Manufacturer: Erbak-Uludağ İçecek A.Ş.
- Origin: Turkey, Bursa, Turkey
- Introduced: 1932; 94 years ago
- Color: Colorless
- Variants: Uludağ Gazoz Orange; Uludağ Gazoz Zero Sugar; Uludağ Gazoz Orange Zero Sugar; Uludağ Gazoz Ginger; Uludağ Zero Tonic; Uludağ Gazoz Strawberry; Uludağ Limonata; Uludağ Meyvelim; Uludağ Frutti Extra
- Related products: Sprite
- Website: uludagicecek.com.tr

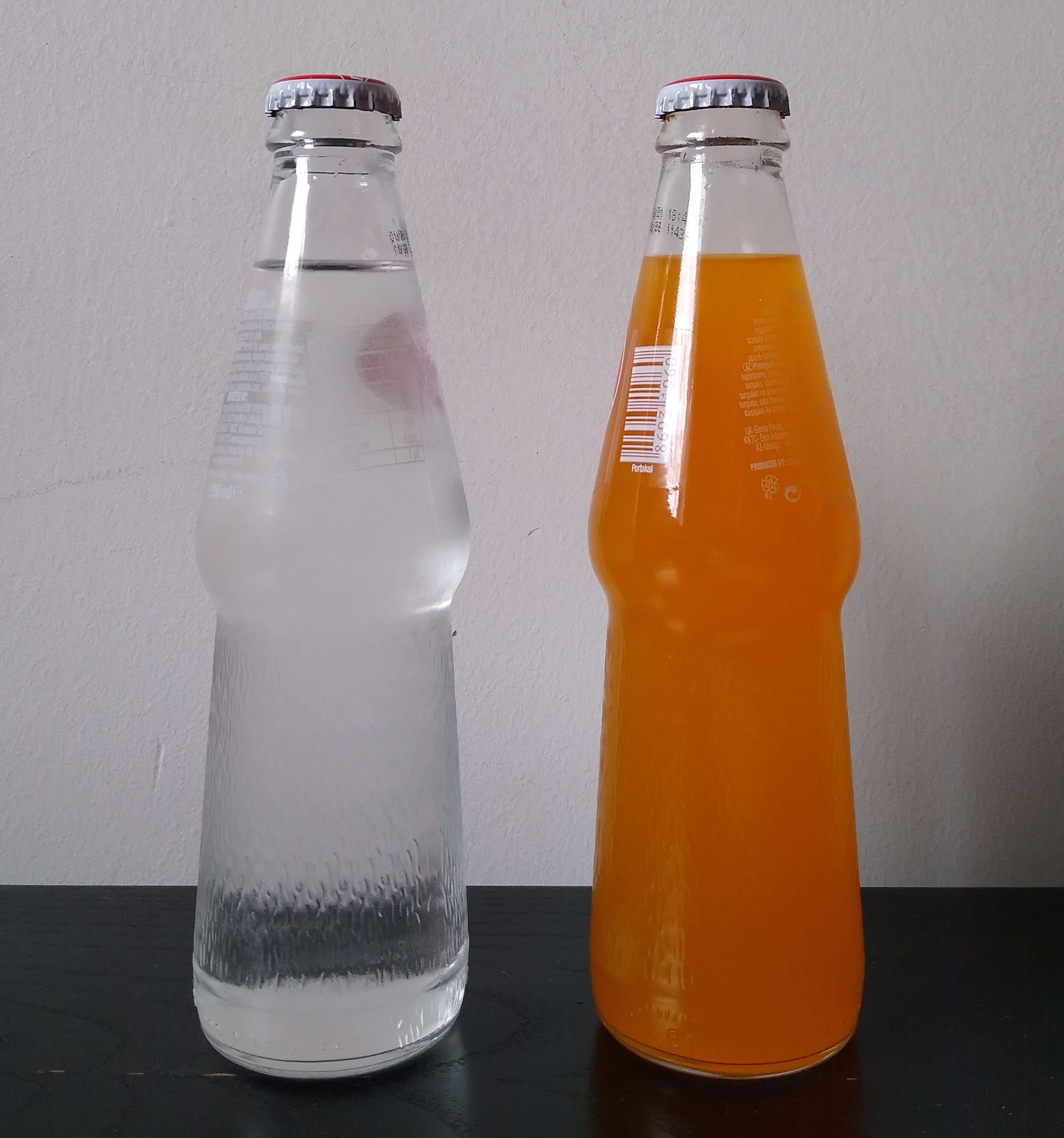
Uludağ Gazoz

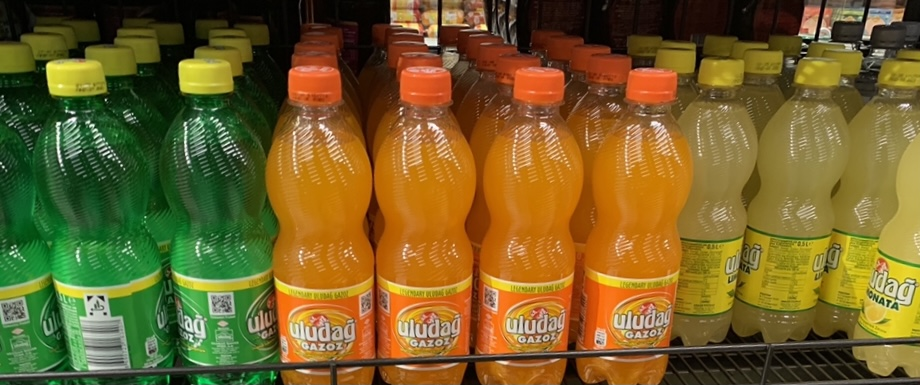
Various flavours of Uludağ Gazoz

Uludağ Gazoz (Uludağ for short) is a soft drink of the Turkish manufacturer Erbak-Uludağ İçecek A.Ş. located in Bursa. The carbonated lemonade (Gazoz) is also known in other countries.

The brand name dates back to the development of the classic Uludağ Gazoz in 1930. In addition to the lemon flavour, a version with orange flavour is marketed as Uludağ Gazoz Orange. In 2018, the drinks were exported to more than 30 countries.

In 2013, the manufacturer Erbak-Uludağ İçecek A.Ş. achieved total sales of over 200 million U.S. dollars.

== Naming ==
The branded labels use the name of Mount Uludağ located in western Turkey. Previously, the drink was made exclusively from water sources of this mountain. Gazoz is a Turkish lemonade variety, and Uludağ Gazoz is the most well known. The word Gazoz is based on the French word gazeuse or in English gaseous or in Arabic "Gazuz"; in the Turkish language, it generally refers to carbonated sweetened lemonade of any kind.
