= 2023–24 Süper Lig =

66th season of top tier Turkish football league

Süper Lig
- Season: 2023–24
- Dates: 11 August 2023 – 26 May 2024
- Champions: Galatasaray; 24th title
- Relegated: Ankaragücü; Fatih Karagümrük; Pendikspor; İstanbulspor
- Champions League: Galatasaray; Fenerbahçe
- Europa League: Beşiktaş; Trabzonspor
- Conference League: Başakşehir
- Matches: 380
- Goals: 1,062 (2.79 per match)
- Top goalscorer: Mauro Icardi (25 goals)
- Biggest home win: Fenerbahçe 7–1 Konyaspor (10 January 2024); Alanyaspor 6–0 İstanbulspor (28 April 2024); Fenerbahçe 6–0 İstanbulspor (26 May 2024)
- Biggest away win: Pendikspor 0–5 Fenerbahçe (29 October 2023); Adana Demirspor 1–6 Gaziantep (12 May 2024)
- Highest scoring: Fenerbahçe 7–1 Konyaspor (10 January 2024); Galatasaray 6–2 Rizespor (8 March 2024); Adana Demirspor 2–6 Başakşehir (26 May 2024)
- Longest winning run: 17 games Galatasaray
- Longest unbeaten run: 27 games Fenerbahçe
- Longest winless run: 10 games Hatayspor; İstanbulspor; Kayserispor
- Longest losing run: 7 games Kayserispor
- Highest attendance: 53,775; Galatasaray 0–1 Fenerbahçe (19 May 2024)
- Attendance: 4,190,282 (11,027 per match)

The 2023–24 Süper Lig, officially called the Trendyol Süper Lig 2023–24 season, was the 66th season of the Süper Lig, the highest tier football league of Turkey.

The fixtures were announced on 18 July 2023 at 21:30 (UTC+3). The defending champions Galatasaray successfully retained their title.

On 12 December 2023 it was announced that the league was suspended indefinitely following Ankaragücü president Faruk Koca's punching of referee Halil Umut Meler after their home match against Rizespor. However, on 13 December 2023, the same day Meler was discharged from the hospital, it was agreed that league games would resume on 19 December.

While Fenerbahçe held the record for the most points in a season by collecting 93 points in the 1988–89 season, Galatasaray became the new owner of this record by collecting 102 points, sealing the final 3 points with a win against Konyaspor that handed them both the title and the first Süper Lig 100-point season.

Galatasaray improved the longest winning record with 17 wins in a row between weeks 19 and 36.

Fenerbahçe previously held the record for the most wins in a season with 29 wins in the 1988–89 season. Galatasaray became the new owner of this record with 33 wins. Fenerbahçe played 36 matches, achieving 29 wins, 6 draws, and 1 loss, with an average of 2.58 points per match, making them the team with the "best performance" in the Süper Lig. Galatasaray broke this record this season by playing 38 matches, achieving 33 wins, 3 draws, and 2 losses, with an average of 2.68 points per match, becoming the new holders of the "best performance" record.

== Teams ==
A total of 20 teams contest the league, including 17 sides from the 2022–23 season and 2022–23 TFF First League champions Samsunspor, runners-up Rizespor and play-off winners Pendikspor. Rizespor immediately returned to top level and Pendikspor is competing in the Süper Lig for the first time in their history. Samsunspor returned to top level after 11 years. The bottom four teams will be relegated to the 2024–25 TFF First League.

=== Changes from last season ===
Ümraniyespor was the first team that had been relegated to 2023–24 TFF First League after a 2-1 loss to Ankaragücü at away on 21 May 2023, ending its one-year stay in Süper Lig. The second team relegated was Giresunspor, who sealed their fate due to İstanbulspor's 4-0 win against Ümraniyespor at home on 7 May 2023 despite a 2-0 win to Antalyaspor at home on same day and ended their two-year stay in the top flight.

The first promoted team was Samsunspor whose 4–1 won home against Keçiörengücü on 23 April 2023 confirmed their return to Super Lig after eleven years. The second team that got promoted is Çaykur Rizespor, who a goalless draw with Altınordu on 21 May 2023 and returned to the top flight immediately. The third and final team to qualify for Süper Lig was Pendikspor. After defeating Bodrumspor 2–1 in play-offs final on 8 June 2023 at Akhisar, Pendikspor entered the top flight for the first time in the club's history.

Thanks to Turkey's improved ranking (12th place at the end of the 2022-23 season), the Süper Lig return to qualifies 5 teams in European football instead of 4; 2 in 2024-25 UEFA Champions League (the champions will enter the playoff round and the runner-up will enter the second qualifying round), 2 in 2024-25 UEFA Europa League (the winner of the 2023-24 Turkish Cup will enter the playoff round and the team in third place will enter the second qualifying round), and 1 in 2024-25 UEFA Conference League (the team in fourth place will enter the second qualifying round)

=== Stadiums and locations ===
Location of teams in 2023–24 Süper Lig
Istanbul Province clubs

Team	Home city/borough	Home province	Stadium	Capacity
Adana Demirspor	Adana	Adana	New Adana Stadium	33,543
Alanyaspor	Alanya	Antalya	Alanya Oba Stadium	10,130
Ankaragücü	Ankara	Ankara	Eryaman Stadium	20,560
Antalyaspor	Antalya	Antalya	Corendon Airlines Park	32,537
Başakşehir	Başakşehir	Istanbul	Başakşehir Fatih Terim Stadium	17,156
Beşiktaş	Beşiktaş	Istanbul	Tüpraş Stadium	42,590
Fatih Karagümrük	Fatih	Istanbul	Vefa Stadium	12,000
Fenerbahçe	Kadıköy	Istanbul	Şükrü Saracoğlu Stadium	47,834
Galatasaray	Sarıyer	Istanbul	Rams Park	52,280
Gaziantep	Gaziantep	Gaziantep	Kalyon Stadium	33,502
Hatayspor	Antakya	Hatay	Mersin Stadium (Note: Hatayspor played their home matches in Mersin due to Hatay Stadium having been affected by the 2023 Turkey–Syria earthquakes.)	25,497
İstanbulspor	Büyükçekmece	Istanbul	Esenyurt Necmi Kadıoğlu Stadium	7,500
Kasımpaşa	Kasımpaşa	Istanbul	Recep Tayyip Erdoğan Stadium	14,234
Kayserispor	Kayseri	Kayseri	RHG Enertürk Enerji Stadium	32,864
Konyaspor	Konya	Konya	Konya Metropolitan Municipality Stadium	42,000
Pendikspor	Pendik	Istanbul	Pendik Stadium	2,500
Rizespor	Rize	Rize	Rize City Stadium	15,332
Samsunspor	Samsun	Samsun	Samsun 19 Mayıs Stadium	33,919
Sivasspor	Sivas	Sivas	New Sivas 4 Eylül Stadium	27,532
Trabzonspor	Trabzon	Trabzon	Şenol Güneş Sports Complex	40,782

=== Personnel and sponsorship ===
Team	Head coach	Captain	Kit manufacturer	Shirt sponsors (front)	Shirt sponsors (back)	Shirt sponsors (sleeve)	Shorts sponsors	Socks sponsors
Adana Demirspor	(Turkey) Hikmet Karaman	(Italy) Mario Balotelli	New Balance	Bitexen, Yukatel	Kozuva	Eforgaz, Renticar	DoubleTree by Hilton	Bitexen
Alanyaspor	(Turkey) Fatih Tekke	(Turkey) Efecan Karaca	Uhlsport	TAV Airports	Aksa	Kırbıyık Holding, Corendon Airlines	None	None
Ankaragücü	(Turkey) Emre Belözoğlu	(Turkey) Tolga Ciğerci	Umbro	ERG Şirketler Grubu, Alagöz Holding	Aksa	TRInvest, Makina ve Kimya Endüstrisi	MİA Teknoloji, Tripy Mobility	None
Antalyaspor	(Turkey) Sergen Yalçın	(Turkey) Veysel Sarı	Nike	Çağlayan Group, Bitexen	Aksa	Corendon Airlines	Kırbıyık Holding, Altıntar	Bitexen
Başakşehir	(Turkey) Çağdaş Atan	(Turkey) Volkan Babacan	Joma	Balkar	Aksa	HDI Sigorta	YKT Filo Kiralama	None
Beşiktaş	(Turkey) Serdar Topraktepe (caretaker)	(Turkey) Necip Uysal	Adidas	Rain	Beko	Nesine.com, Papara	Pasha Group	Papara
Fatih Karagümrük	(Turkey) Tolunay Kafkas	(Germany) Münir Levent Mercan	Wulfz	VavaCars	Aksa	Bitci	Ankara Sigorta	None
Fenerbahçe	(Turkey) İsmail Kartal	(Bosnia and Herzegovina) Edin Džeko	Puma	Otokoç	Halley	Nesine.com, Safiport	Aygaz, Pasha Group	Gedik Yatırım
Galatasaray	(Turkey) Okan Buruk	(Uruguay) Fernando Muslera	Nike	Sixt	Tatilsepeti	Bilyoner, Yünsa	Başkent İnşaat	None
Gaziantep	(Turkey) Selçuk İnan / (Turkey) Volkan Kazak	(Senegal) Papy Djilobodji	Nike	Çimko, Kara Holding	Trendyol Yemek	York Car Rental	Yılda Şirketler Grubu	None
Hatayspor	(Turkey) Özhan Pulat	(Turkey) Kamil Ahmet Çörekçi	Puma	Trendyol Yemek	Aksa	Nesine.com	Yatırım Finansman, Aras Kargo	Bitexen
İstanbulspor	(Turkey) Osman Zeki Korkmaz	(Turkey) Mehmet Yeşil	Raru	Boğaziçi Beton	Aksa	Boğaziçi Beton	None	None
Kasımpaşa	(Turkey) Sami Uğurlu	(Nigeria) Kenneth Omeruo	Puma	Ciner	Aksa	Uludağ	Rent Go	None
Kayserispor	(Turkey) Burak Yılmaz / (Croatia) Hari Vukas	(Greece) Dimitrios Kolovetsios	Nike	İstikbal	SR Döner	Kayseri Şeker	Grup Avenir	None
Konyaspor	(Turkey) Ali Çamdalı	(Turkey) Soner Dikmen	New Balance	Tümosan	Aksa	Torku	Wish Car Rental	None
Pendikspor	(Turkey) İbrahim Üzülmez	(Turkey) Erdem Özgenç	Puma	Magdeburger Sigorta	Fortis Otomotiv	None	None	None
Rizespor	(Turkey) İlhan Palut	(Turkey) Gökhan Akkan	Nike	Çaykur	Aksa	Didi Soğuk Çay	Didi Soğuk Çay	None
Samsunspor	(Germany) Markus Gisdol	(Turkey) Osman Çelik	Hummel	Yılport, Old Spice	Yılsolar	None	Yılyak	None
Sivasspor	(Turkey) Bülent Uygun	(Turkey) Ziya Erdal	Tony Montana	Brand Vadi Istanbul	Aksa	Bitexen, Stella Motors	Misli	None
Trabzonspor	(Turkey) Abdullah Avcı	(Turkey) Uğurcan Çakır	Joma	Vestel	WhiteBIT	Safiport, QNB Finansbank	Rent Go, Papara	Miller Holding

=== Managerial changes ===
Team	Outgoing manager	Manner of departure	Date of vacancy	Position in table	Replaced by	Date of appointment
Gaziantep FK	Vacant			Pre-season	(Turkey) Erdal Güneş	24 May 2023
Sivasspor	(Turkey) Rıza Çalımbay	End of contract	7 June 2023	Pre-season	(Turkey) Servet Çetin	26 June 2023
Rizespor	(Turkey) Bülent Korkmaz	End of contract	8 June 2023	Pre-season	(Turkey) İlhan Palut	13 June 2023
Fenerbahçe	(Portugal) Jorge Jesus	End of contract	12 June 2023	Pre-season	(Turkey) İsmail Kartal	28 June 2023
Adana Demirspor	(Italy) Vincenzo Montella	End of contract	12 June 2023	Pre-season	(Netherlands) Patrick Kluivert	1 July 2023
Başakşehir	(Turkey) Emre Belözoğlu	Mutual agreement	3 September 2023	19th	(Turkey) Çağdaş Atan	6 September 2023
Gaziantep FK	(Turkey) Erdal Güneş	Mutual agreement	4 September 2023	20th	(Romania) Marius Șumudică	6 September 2023
Kayserispor	(Turkey) Çağdaş Atan	Mutual agreement	6 September 2023	9th	(Turkey) Recep Uçar	6 September 2023
İstanbulspor	(Turkey) Fatih Tekke	Mutual agreement	25 September 2023	19th	(Switzerland) Hakan Yakin	16 October 2023
Samsunspor	(Turkey) Hüseyin Eroğlu	Mutual agreement	27 September 2023	20th	(Germany) Markus Gisdol	10 October 2023
Ankaragücü	(Turkey) Tolunay Kafkas	Mutual agreement	2 October 2023	14th	(Turkey) Emre Belözoğlu	3 October 2023
Beşiktaş	(Turkey) Şenol Güneş	Mutual agreement	6 October 2023	4th	(Turkey) Burak Yılmaz (caretaker)	7 October 2023
Trabzonspor	(Croatia) Nenad Bjelica	Mutual agreement	12 October 2023	7th	(Turkey) Abdullah Avcı	12 October 2023
Pendikspor	(Turkey) Osman Özköylü	Mutual agreement	9 October 2023	18th	(Portugal) Ivo Vieira	17 October 2023
Konyaspor	(Serbia) Aleksandar Stanojević	Mutual agreement	22 October 2023	15th	(Turkey) Hakan Keleş	27 October 2023
Alanyaspor	(Turkey) Ömer Erdoğan	Mutual agreement	29 October 2023	11th	(Turkey) Fatih Tekke	3 November 2023
Beşiktaş	(Turkey) Burak Yılmaz (caretaker)	Resignation	10 November 2023	5th	(Turkey) Rıza Çalımbay	11 November 2023
Adana Demirspor	(Netherlands) Patrick Kluivert	Sacked	4 December 2023	5th	(Turkey) Hikmet Karaman	18 January 2024
Fatih Karagümrük	(Turkey) Alparslan Erdem	Mutual agreement	11 December 2023	13th	(Georgia (country)) Shota Arveladze	11 December 2023
Beşiktaş	(Turkey) Rıza Çalımbay	Sacked	22 December 2023	5th	(Portugal) Fernando Santos	7 January 2024
Sivasspor	(Turkey) Servet Çetin	Mutual agreement	30 December 2023	10th	(Turkey) Bülent Uygun	1 January 2024
Antalyaspor	(Turkey) Nuri Şahin	Mutual agreement	31 December 2023	8th	(Turkey) Sergen Yalçın	3 January 2024
Konyaspor	(Turkey) Hakan Keleş	Resignation	11 January 2024	18th	(Bosnia and Herzegovina) Fahrudin Omerović	15 January 2024
İstanbulspor	(Switzerland) Hakan Yakın	Mutual agreement	19 January 2024	20th	(Turkey) Osman Zeki Korkmaz	19 January 2024
Kayserispor	(Turkey) Recep Uçar	Mutual agreement	27 January 2024	11th	(Turkey) Burak Yılmaz	28 January 2024
Pendikspor	(Portugal) Ivo Vieira	Mutual agreement	29 February 2024	19th	(Turkey) İbrahim Üzülmez	29 February 2024
Gaziantep FK	(Romania) Marius Șumudică	Mutual agreement	6 March 2024	18th	(Turkey) Selçuk İnan	8 March 2024
Beşiktaş	(Portugal) Fernando Santos	Sacked	13 April 2024	4th	(Turkey) Serdar Topraktepe (caretaker)	13 April 2024
Konyaspor	(Bosnia and Herzegovina) Fahrudin Omerović	Sacked	29 April 2024	16th	(Turkey) Ali Çamdalı (caretaker)	2 May 2024
Hatayspor	(Turkey) Volkan Demirel	Mutual agreement	3 May 2024	18th	(Turkey) Özhan Pulat	3 May 2024

=== Foreign players ===
Team	Player 1	Player 2	Player 3	Player 4	Player 5	Player 6	Player 7	Player 8	Player 9	Player 10	Player 11	Player 12	Player 13	Player 14	Player 15	Player 16	Former Players
Adana Demirspor	(Albania) Florent Shehu	(Algeria) Youcef Atal	(Angola) Maestro	(Azerbaijan) Shakhruddin Magomedaliyev	(Colombia) Stiven Mendoza	(France) Édouard Michut	(France) Nabil Alioui	(Guadeloupe) Andreaw Gravillon	(Iran) Milad Mohammadi	(Italy) Mario Balotelli	(Kazakhstan) Abat Aymbetov	(North Macedonia) Jovan Manev	(Portugal) Nani	(Senegal) Pape Abou Cissé	(Spain) José Rodríguez	(Tunisia) Motez Nourani	(Bosnia and Herzegovina) Goran Karačić (France) Benjamin Stambouli (Kosovo) Arbër Zeneli (Morocco) Younès Belhanda (Nigeria) Babajide David (Norway) Jonas Svensson (Portugal) Kévin Rodrigues (Senegal) Badou Ndiaye (Senegal) Cherif Ndiaye (Senegal) M'Baye Niang
Alanyaspor	(Angola) Loide Augusto	(Brazil) Anderson	(Brazil) Carlos Eduardo	(Brazil) Richard	(Denmark) Pione Sisto	(Egypt) Ahmed Hassan	(France) Nicolas Janvier	(Kosovo) Fidan Aliti	(Kosovo) Florent Hadergjonaj	(Netherlands) Leroy Fer	(Portugal) João Novais	(Portugal) Nuno Lima	(Slovenia) Jure Balkovec	(South Korea) Hwang Ui-jo			(Brazil) Eduardo Bauermann (Venezuela) Sergio Córdova
Ankaragücü	(Bosnia and Herzegovina) Nihad Mujakić	(Bosnia and Herzegovina) Riad Bajić	(Cameroon) Christian Bassogog	(Cape Verde) Garry Rodrigues	(Czech Republic) Matěj Hanousek	(France) Alexis Flips	(The Gambia) Ali Sowe	(Greece) Anastasios Chatzigiovanis	(Greece) Stelios Kitsiou	(Italy) Federico Macheda	(Italy) Riccardo Saponara	(Jamaica) Renaldo Cephas	(Kyrgyzstan) Sirozhiddin Astanakulov	(Portugal) Pedrinho	(Romania) Olimpiu Moruțan	(Serbia) Uroš Radaković	(Bosnia and Herzegovina) Andrej Đokanović (Georgia (country)) Giorgi Beridze (Poland) Rafał Gikiewicz
Antalyaspor	(Bosnia and Herzegovina) Deni Milošević	(Bosnia and Herzegovina) Dario Šarić	(Brazil) Helton Leite	(Brazil) Naldo	(Democratic Republic of the Congo) Britt Assombalonga	(Israel) Ramzi Safouri	(Israel) Sagiv Yehezkel	(Kosovo) Amar Gërxhaliu	(Kosovo) Zymer Bytyqi	(Netherlands) Sander van de Streek	(North Macedonia) Erdal Rakip	(Poland) Adam Buksa	(Poland) Jakub Kałuziński	(Sweden) Sam Larsson			(Angola) Fredy (Philippines) Gerrit Holtmann
Başakşehir	(Algeria) Mehdi Abeid	(Brazil) Davidson	(Brazil) João Figueiredo	(Brazil) Léo Duarte	(Brazil) Lucas Lima	(Brazil) Souza	(Cameroon) Olivier Kemen	(France) Léo Dubois	(Ghana) Jerome Opoku	(Greece) Dimitrios Pelkas	(Ivory Coast) Mohamed Fofana	(Poland) Krzysztof Piątek	(Senegal) Ousseynou Ba	(Senegal) Philippe Kény	(Serbia) Danijel Aleksić		(Algeria) Ahmed Touba (Guinea-Bissau) Edgar Ié (Israel) Eden Kartsev (Nigeria) Emmanuel Dennis
Beşiktaş	(Albania) Ernest Muçi	(Algeria) Rachid Ghezzal	(Bosnia and Herzegovina) Amir Hadžiahmetović	(Cameroon) Vincent Aboubakar	(Croatia) Ante Rebić	(Democratic Republic of the Congo) Arthur Masuaku	(Democratic Republic of the Congo) Jackson Muleka	(England) Alex Oxlade-Chamberlain	(England) Joe Worrall	(The Gambia) Omar Colley	(Ghana) Daniel Amartey	(Kazakhstan) Bakhtiyar Zaynutdinov	(Kosovo) Milot Rashica	(Libya) Al-Musrati	(Norway) Jonas Svensson	(Portugal) Gedson Fernandes	(Cameroon) Jean Onana (France) Valentin Rosier (Ivory Coast) Eric Bailly
Fatih Karagümrük	(Albania) Frédéric Veseli	(Algeria) Sofiane Feghouli	(Brazil) Marcão	(Cape Verde) Ryan Mendes	(Croatia) Tonio Teklić	(France) Valentin Eysseric	(Greece) Dimitrios Kourbelis	(Italy) Andrea Bertolacci	(Italy) Davide Biraschi	(Italy) Federico Ceccherini	(Italy) Flavio Paoletti	(Italy) Kevin Lasagna	(Italy) Salvatore Sirigu	(Nigeria) Lawrence Nicholas	(Sweden) Marcus Rohdén		(Argentina) Matías Dituro (Italy) Stefano Sturaro (Kosovo) Ibrahim Drešević (Netherlands) Brahim Darri (Serbia) Adem Ljajić (Uzbekistan) Otabek Shukurov
Fenerbahçe	(Belgium) Michy Batshuayi	(Bosnia and Herzegovina) Edin Džeko	(Bosnia and Herzegovina) Rade Krunić	(Brazil) Fred	(Brazil) Luan Peres	(Brazil) Rodrigo Becão	(England) Ryan Kent	(Croatia) Dominik Livaković	(Ghana) Alexander Djiku	(Italy) Leonardo Bonucci	(Netherlands) Jayden Oosterwolde	(Nigeria) Bright Osayi-Samuel	(Norway) Joshua King	(Poland) Sebastian Szymański	(Serbia) Dušan Tadić	(Slovenia) Miha Zajc	(Brazil) Lincoln (Portugal) Miguel Crespo
Galatasaray	(Argentina) Mauro Icardi	(Belgium) Dries Mertens	(Brazil) Carlos Vinícius	(Brazil) Tetê	(Colombia) Davinson Sánchez	(Denmark) Victor Nelsson	(France) Tanguy Ndombele	(Germany) Derrick Köhn	(Ivory Coast) Serge Aurier	(Ivory Coast) Wilfried Zaha	(Morocco) Hakim Ziyech	(Portugal) Sérgio Oliveira	(Uruguay) Fernando Muslera	(Uruguay) Lucas Torreira			(Democratic Republic of the Congo) Cédric Bakambu (France) Léo Dubois (France) Sacha Boey (Spain) Angeliño
Gaziantep	(Brazil) Júnior Morais	(Cameroon) Nicolas Nkoulou	(Cape Verde) Jamiro Monteiro	(Democratic Republic of the Congo) Salem M'Bakata	(Guinea-Bissau) Janio Bikel	(Honduras) Bryan Acosta	(Ivory Coast) Max Gradel	(Romania) Alexandru Maxim	(Romania) Deian Sorescu	(Romania) Denis Drăguș	(Romania) Florin Niță	(Senegal) Aliou Badji	(Senegal) Papy Djilobodji	(Serbia) Lazar Marković	(Serbia) Marko Jevtović		(Algeria) Naoufel Khacef (Colombia) Brayan Riascos (Kosovo) Valmir Veliu (North Macedonia) Luka Stankovski (Switzerland) Albian Ajeti
Hatayspor	(Algeria) Faouzi Ghoulam	(Azerbaijan) Renat Dadashov	(Bosnia and Herzegovina) Armin Hodžić	(Cameroon) Guy Kilama	(France) Mehdi Boudjemaa	(France) Rayane Aabid	(Georgia (country)) Giorgi Aburjania	(Honduras) Rigoberto Rivas	(Kosovo) Visar Bekaj	(Nigeria) Fisayo Dele-Bashiru	(Portugal) Joelson Fernandes	(Portugal) Rui Sousa	(Republic of the Congo) Chandrel Massanga	(Serbia) Nikola Maksimović	(Sweden) Carlos Strandberg		(Cameroon) Didier Lamkel Zé
İstanbulspor	(Brazil) Jackson	(Democratic Republic of the Congo) Giannelli Imbula	(England) Demeaco Duhaney	(Gabon) David Sambissa	(Ivory Coast) Djakaridja Traoré	(Ivory Coast) Simon Deli	(Kosovo) Florian Loshaj	(Lithuania) Modestas Vorobjovas	(Senegal) Mendy Mamadou	(Senegal) Racine Coly							(Albania) Eduard Rroca (Denmark) David Jensen (Greece) Apostolos Diamantis (Kosovo) Jetmir Topalli (North Macedonia) Valon Ethemi (Senegal) Alassane Ndao
Kasımpaşa	(Belgium) Julien Ngoy	(Bosnia and Herzegovina) Haris Hajradinović	(Brazil) Cláudio Winck	(Cape Verde) Nuno da Costa	(Democratic Republic of the Congo) Samuel Bastien	(Ecuador) Jackson Porozo	(Greece) Andreas Gianniotis	(Ivory Coast) Trazié Thomas	(Kosovo) Loret Sadiku	(Netherlands) Dries Saddiki	(Nigeria) Kenneth Omeruo	(Portugal) Rochinha	(Senegal) Mamadou Fall	(Tunisia) Mortadha Ben Ouanes			(France) Iron Gomis
Kayserispor	(Cameroon) Stéphane Bahoken	(France) Lionel Carole	(Ghana) Joseph Attamah	(Ghana) Yaw Ackah	(Greece) Dimitrios Kolovetsios	(Guinea) Julian Jeanvier	(Guinea-Bissau) Carlos Mané	(Haiti) Duckens Nazon	(Iran) Ali Karimi	(Iran) Majid Hosseini	(Morocco) Mehdi Bourabia	(Nigeria) Anthony Uzodimma	(Portugal) Aylton Boa Morte	(Portugal) Miguel Cardoso	(Uzbekistan) Otabek Shukurov		(Cameroon) Olivier Kemen (Senegal) Mame Thiam
Konyaspor	(Albania) Sokol Cikalleshi	(Angola) Bruno Paz	(Brazil) Guilherme	(Colombia) Marlos Moreno	(Croatia) Niko Rak	(Denmark) Louka Prip	(France) Steven Nzonzi	(Ghana) Emmanuel Boateng	(Ivory Coast) Anderson Niangbo	(North Macedonia) Valon Ethemi	(Poland) Jakub Słowik	(Romania) Alexandru Cicâldău	(Senegal) Alassane Ndao	(Senegal) Bouly Sambou	(Serbia) Filip Damjanović	(Zimbabwe) Teenage Hadebe	(Costa Rica) Francisco Calvo (Croatia) Robert Murić (France) Paul Bernardoni (Poland) Konrad Michalak (Portugal) Nélson Oliveira
Pendikspor	(Albania) Endri Çekiçi	(Brazil) Welinton	(Democratic Republic of the Congo) Arnaud Lusamba	(Mali) Abdoulay Diaby	(Nigeria) Emeka Eze	(Norway) Fredrik Midtsjø	(Portugal) Sequeira	(Senegal) Badou Ndiaye	(Senegal) Joher Rassoul	(Senegal) Mame Thiam	(Suriname) Leandro Kappel						(Brazil) Thuram (Croatia) Josip Vuković (Egypt) Ahmed Hassan (Greece) Georgios Tzavellas (Paraguay) Óscar Romero (Syria) Aias Aosman
Rizespor	(Argentina) Adolfo Gaich	(Bosnia and Herzegovina) Dal Varešanović	(Brazil) Gustavo Sauer	(Bulgaria) Martin Minchev	(Denmark) Casper Højer	(England) Jonjo Shelvey	(Finland) Janne-Pekka Laine	(Hungary) Attila Mocsi	(Kosovo) Altin Zeqiri	(Nigeria) Azubuike Okechukwu	(Nigeria) David Akintola	(Nigeria) Ibrahim Olawoyin	(Senegal) Mame Mor Faye	(Senegal) Oumar Diouf	(Uzbekistan) Husniddin Aliqulov		(Cameroon) John Mary (Spain) Pinchi
Samsunspor	(Albania) Arbnor Muja	(Belgium) Benito Raman	(Belgium) Landry Dimata	(Cameroon) Olivier Ntcham	(Chad) Marius	(Denmark) Carlo Holse	(England) Marc Bola	(France) Flavien Tait	(Ghana) Kingsley Schindler	(Ivory Coast) Moryké Fofana	(Morocco) Youssef Aït Bennasser	(Netherlands) Rick van Drongelen	(Poland) Jakub Szumski	(Slovakia) Ľubomír Šatka			(Brazil) Douglas Tanque (Democratic Republic of the Congo) Gaëtan Laura (Guinea-Bissau) Nanu
Sivasspor	(Albania) Rey Manaj	(Cameroon) Clinton N'Jie	(Croatia) 'Mijo Caktaš	(Czech Republic) Roman Květ	(Gabon) Aaron Appindangoyé	(The Gambia) Modou Barrow	(Greece) Achilleas Poungouras	(Greece) Charis Charisis	(Guinea) Bengali-Fodé Koita	(Mali) Samba Camara	(Netherlands) Queensy Menig	(Serbia) Đorđe Nikolić	(Uzbekistan) Azizbek Turgunboev				(Ivory Coast) Kader Keïta (Luxembourg) Gerson Rodrigues (Nigeria) Ahmed Musa (Spain) Samuel Sáiz
Trabzonspor	(Belgium) Thomas Meunier	(Bosnia and Herzegovina) Edin Višća	(Croatia) Filip Benković	(Croatia) Mislav Oršić	(Egypt) Trézéguet	(France) Batista Mendy	(Greece) Taxiarchis Fountas	(Ivory Coast) Nicolas Pépé	(Montenegro) Ognjen Bakić	(Nigeria) Paul Onuachu	(North Macedonia) Enis Bardhi	(Suriname) Stefano Denswil	(Spain) Joaquín				(Croatia) Tonio Teklić (Denmark) Jens Stryger (Greece) Anastasios Bakasetas (Greece) Dimitrios Kourbelis

== League table ==
Pos	Team	Pld	W	D	L	GF	GA	GD	Pts	Qualification or relegation
1	Galatasaray (C)	38	33	3	2	92	26	+66	102	Qualification for the Champions League play-off round
2	Fenerbahçe	38	31	6	1	99	31	+68	99	Qualification for the Champions League second qualifying round
3	Trabzonspor	38	21	4	13	69	50	+19	67	Qualification for the Europa League second qualifying round
4	Başakşehir	38	18	7	13	57	43	+14	61	Qualification for the Conference League second qualifying round
5	Kasımpaşa	38	16	8	14	62	65	−3	56 (Note: Kasımpaşa are ahead of Beşiktaş on head-to-head points: Kasımpaşa 2–1 Beşiktaş, Beşiktaş 1–3 Kasımpaşa.)	
6	Beşiktaş	38	16	8	14	52	47	+5	56	Qualification for the Europa League play-off round (Note: The 2023–24 Turkish Cup winners (Beşiktaş) qualify for the Europa League play-off round.)
7	Sivasspor	38	14	12	12	47	54	−7	54	
8	Alanyaspor	38	12	16	10	53	50	+3	52	
9	Rizespor	38	14	8	16	48	58	−10	50	
10	Antalyaspor	38	12	13	13	44	49	−5	49	
11	Gaziantep	38	12	8	18	50	57	−7	44 (Note: Gaziantep are ahead of Adana Demirspor on head-to-head points: Gaziantep 2–2 Adana Demirspor, Adana Demirspor 1–6 Gaziantep.)	
12	Adana Demirspor	38	10	14	14	54	61	−7	44	
13	Samsunspor	38	11	10	17	42	52	−10	43	
14	Kayserispor (Note: 3 points deducted)	38	11	12	15	44	57	−13	42	
15	Hatayspor	38	9	14	15	45	52	−7	41 (Note: Hatayspor are ahead of Konyaspor on overall goal difference.)	
16	Konyaspor	38	9	14	15	40	53	−13	41	
17	Ankaragücü (R)	38	8	16	14	46	52	−6	40 (Note: Ankaragücü are ahead of Fatih Karagümrük on head-to-head points: Fatih Karagümrük 1–1 Ankaragücü, Ankaragücü 2–0 Fatih Karagümrük.)	Relegation to TFF First League
18	Fatih Karagümrük (R)	38	10	10	18	49	52	−3	40	Relegation to TFF First League
19	Pendikspor (R)	38	9	10	19	42	73	−31	37	Relegation to TFF First League
20	İstanbulspor (Note: 3 points deducted) (R)	38	4	7	27	27	80	−53	16	Relegation to TFF First League

Source: Süper Lig
Rules for classification: 1) Points; 2) Head-to-head points; 3) Head-to-head goal difference; 4) Head-to-head goals scored; 5) Goal difference; 6) Goals scored; 7) Play-off.
(C) Champions; (R) Relegated

== Results ==
Home \ Away	ADE	ALA	ANK	ANT	BAŞ	BEŞ	FKA	FEN	GAL	GFK	HAT	İST	KAS	KAY	KON	PEN	RİZ	SAM	SİV	TRA
Adana Demirspor	—	4–0	1–1	2–1	2–6	4–2	1–0	0–0	0–3	1–6	0–1	2–2	1–3	0–0	3–0	3–0	2–1	2–3	4–1	1–0
Alanyaspor	3–3	—	1–1	1–1	2–0	1–1	2–1	0–1	0–4	0–3	0–0	6–0	3–3	1–0	2–2	1–1	2–1	3–1	1–2	3–1
Ankaragücü	1–1	1–1	—	0–4	2–1	1–1	2–0	0–1	0–3	3–1	0–0	1–1	3–1	3–0	1–1	0–0	1–1	2–0	0–0	0–1
Antalyaspor	2–1	0–0	1–1	—	1–0	3–2	2–1	0–2	0–2	1–0	2–1	2–2	0–0	1–1	1–1	1–2	0–0	2–0	2–1	1–1
Başakşehir	0–0	3–2	3–3	1–0	—	1–1	0–2	0–1	1–2	2–0	1–0	2–0	4–1	2–3	0–1	4–1	2–0	1–0	3–1	0–1
Beşiktaş	0–0	1–3	2–0	1–2	1–0	—	3–0	1–3	0–1	2–0	2–2	2–0	1–3	2–1	2–0	1–1	3–2	1–1	2–0	2–0
Fatih Karagümrük	2–0	1–1	1–1	4–1	1–1	0–1	—	1–2	2–3	0–3	0–0	3–0	2–3	4–1	1–1	2–0	4–0	3–1	3–0	0–0
Fenerbahçe	4–2	2–2	2–1	3–2	4–0	2–1	2–1	—	0–0	2–1	4–2	6–0	2–1	3–0	7–1	4–1	5–0	1–1	4–1	2–3
Galatasaray	3–1	4–0	2–1	2–1	2–0	2–1	1–0	0–1	—	2–1	1–0	3–1	2–1	2–1	3–0	4–1	6–2	4–2	6–1	2–0
Gaziantep	2–2	0–3	0–1	1–0	0–2	2–0	3–1	0–1	0–3	—	1–1	2–0	2–0	1–1	1–1	2–2	2–0	1–1	1–3	1–3
Hatayspor	3–3	1–1	2–1	3–3	1–2	1–2	3–1	0–2	2–1	0–0	—	0–3	0–0	1–2	3–1	1–1	2–0	3–0	1–1	3–2
İstanbulspor	0–1	0–1	2–1	1–2	0–2	0–2	1–2	1–5	0–1	1–3	2–1	—	1–2	1–1	0–0	2–4	0–4	1–1	1–3	0–3
Kasımpaşa	2–1	2–1	3–2	3–1	0–3	2–1	1–1	0–2	3–4	4–2	3–0	3–1	—	3–4	0–2	1–1	2–2	1–0	0–0	1–5
Kayserispor	1–1	1–0	3–2	1–1	0–0	0–0	2–2	3–4	0–0	2–0	1–1	0–1	0–2	—	2–2	2–0	3–1	2–1	1–3	1–2
Konyaspor	2–2	0–2	1–0	1–1	2–3	0–2	1–1	0–0	1–3	2–0	2–0	1–1	2–0	2–0	—	1–2	1–2	3–0	0–1	1–3
Pendikspor	2–1	1–1	1–1	0–1	2–3	4–0	1–1	0–5	0–2	0–1	1–5	1–0	3–2	1–2	0–2	—	2–1	1–0	2–3	0–2
Rizespor	1–0	0–0	2–2	3–0	3–2	0–4	1–0	1–3	0–1	3–1	2–0	1–0	0–0	3–0	0–0	5–1	—	1–0	1–1	1–0
Samsunspor	1–1	1–1	2–1	2–0	0–0	1–2	1–0	0–2	0–2	1–2	2–1	2–1	4–2	2–0	1–1	0–0	3–0	—	2–0	3–1
Sivasspor	1–1	1–2	1–3	1–1	0–1	1–0	1–0	2–2	1–1	2–2	0–0	1–0	0–1	2–1	1–0	4–1	1–0	1–1	—	3–3
Trabzonspor	1–0	1–0	4–2	1–0	1–1	3–0	5–1	2–3	1–5	4–2	2–0	3–0	2–3	0–1	2–1	2–1	2–3	2–1	0–1	—

Updated to match(es) played on 25 May 2024. Source: Turkish Football Federation (in Turkish)
Legend: Blue = home team win; Yellow = draw; Red = away team win.
For upcoming matches, an "a" indicates there is an article about the rivalry between the two participants.

== Number of teams by geographical region ==
Number	Region	Team(s)
8	Marmara	Başakşehir, Beşiktaş, Fatih Karagümrük, Fenerbahçe, Galatasaray, İstanbulspor, Kasımpaşa and Pendikspor
4	Central Anatolia	Ankaragücü, Kayserispor, Konyaspor and Sivasspor
4	Mediterranean	Adana Demirspor, Alanyaspor, Antalyaspor and Hatayspor
3	Black Sea	Rizespor, Samsunspor and Trabzonspor
1	Southeastern Anatolia	Gaziantep

== Statistics ==
=== Top scorers ===
Rank	Player	Club(s)	Goals
1	(Argentina) Mauro Icardi	Galatasaray	25
2	(Bosnia and Herzegovina) Edin Džeko	Fenerbahçe	21
3	(Albania) Rey Manaj	Sivasspor	18
4	(Poland) Krzysztof Piątek	Başakşehir	17
4	(Senegal) Mame Thiam	Kayserispor/Pendikspor	17
6	(Poland) Adam Buksa	Antalyaspor	16
7	(Nigeria) Paul Onuachu	Trabzonspor	15
8	(Cape Verde) Nuno da Costa	Kasımpaşa	14
8	(Romania) Denis Drăguș	Gaziantep	14
8	(Turkey) Aytaç Kara	Kasımpaşa	14

=== Top assists ===
Rank	Player	Club(s)	Assists
1	(Belgium) Dries Mertens	Galatasaray	15
2	(Bosnia and Herzegovina) Haris Hajradinović	Kasımpaşa	14
3	(Serbia) Dušan Tadić	Fenerbahçe	13
4	(Poland) Sebastian Szymański	Fenerbahçe	11
5	(Turkey) Deniz Türüç	Başakşehir	10
6	(Bosnia and Herzegovina) Edin Višća	Trabzonspor	9
7	(Turkey) Oğuz Aydın	Alanyaspor	8
7	(Argentina) Mauro Icardi	Galatasaray	8
7	(Romania) Alexandru Maxim	Gaziantep	8
10	(Turkey) İrfan Kahveci	Fenerbahçe	7

=== Clean sheets ===
Rank	Player	Club(s)	Clean sheets
1	(Uruguay) Fernando Muslera	Galatasaray	17
2	(Croatia) Dominik Livaković	Fenerbahçe	13
3	(Turkey) Gökhan Akkan	Çaykur Rizespor	12
4	(Turkey) Uğurcan Çakır	Trabzonspor	10
4	(Turkey) Mert Günok	Beşiktaş	10
6	(Turkey) Ertuğrul Taşkıran	Alanyaspor	9
7	(Turkey) Volkan Babacan	Başakşehir	8
7	(Netherlands) Bilal Bayazit	Kayserispor	8
7	(Greece) Andreas Gianniotis	Kasımpaşa	8
7	(Romania) Florin Niță	Gaziantep	8
7	(Turkey) Ali Şaşal Vural	Sivasspor	8

=== Hat-tricks ===
Date	Player	For	Against	Result
21 October 2023	(Senegal) Mame Thiam	Kayserispor	Rizespor	3–1 (H)
29 October 2023	(Bosnia and Herzegovina) Edin Džeko	Fenerbahçe	Pendikspor	5–0 (A)
20 December 2023	(Belgium) Michy Batshuayi	Fenerbahçe	Kayserispor	4–3 (A)
5 January 2024	(Cape Verde) Nuno da Costa	Kasımpaşa	Beşiktaş	3–1 (A)
7 January 2024	(Turkey) Cengiz Ünder^{4}	Fenerbahçe	İstanbulspor	5–1 (A)
10 January 2024	(Sweden) Marcus Rohdén	Fatih Karagümrük	Kayserispor	4–1 (H)
10 January 2024	(Bosnia and Herzegovina) Edin Džeko	Fenerbahçe	Konyaspor	7–1 (H)
28 January 2024	(Poland) Krzysztof Piątek	Başakşehir	Konyaspor	3–2 (A)
8 March 2024	(Germany) Kerem Demirbay	Galatasaray	Çaykur Rizespor	6–2 (H)
28 April 2024	(Nigeria) Paul Onuachu	Trabzonspor	Gaziantep	6–2 (H)
26 May 2024	(Poland) Krzysztof Piątek	Başakşehir	Adana Demirspor	6–2 (A)
26 May 2024	(Turkey) Enis Destan	Trabzonspor	Ankaragücü	4–2 (H)

^{4} Player scored four goals

== Awards ==
=== Annual awards ===
Award	Winner	Club
Manager of the Season	(Turkey) Okan Buruk	Galatasaray

Team of the Season
Goalkeeper	(Uruguay) Fernando Muslera (Galatasaray)			
Defence	(Turkey) Barış Alper Yılmaz (Galatasaray)	(Denmark) Victor Nelsson (Galatasaray)	(Ghana) Alexander Djiku (Fenerbahçe)	(Turkey) Ferdi Kadıoğlu (Fenerbahçe)
Midfield	(Uruguay) Lucas Torreira (Galatasaray)	(Bosnia and Herzegovina) Haris Hajradinović (Kasımpaşa)	(Turkey) Oğuz Aydın (Alanyaspor)	(Belgium) Dries Mertens (Galatasaray)
Attack	(Serbia) Dušan Tadić (Fenerbahçe)		(Argentina) Mauro Icardi (Galatasaray)	

== Attendances ==
Galatasaray drew the highest average home attendance in the 2023-24 edition of the Süper Lig.

#	Football club	Home games	Average attendance
1	Galatasaray	19	43,113
2	Fenerbahçe	19	38,210
3	Beşiktaş	19	24,242
4	Samsunspor	19	17,119
5	Trabzonspor	19	15,386
6	Konyaspor	19	12,220
7	Antalyaspor	19	11,757
8	Adana Demirspor	19	11,444
9	Gaziantep FK	19	8,207
10	MKE Ankaragücü	19	7,606
11	Kayserispor	19	6,812
12	Hatayspor	19	5,821
13	Çaykur Rizespor	19	5,103
14	Sivasspor	19	4,098
15	Alanyaspor	19	3,074
16	Fatih Karagümrük	19	2,684
17	İstanbul Başakşehir	19	2,667
18	Kasımpaşa SK	19	2,470
19	İstanbulspor	19	1,944
20	Pendikspor	19	1,501
