= 2024–25 İstanbul Başakşehir F.K. season =

İstanbul Başakşehir F.K.
2024–25 season
- Manager: Çağdaş Atan
- Stadium: Başakşehir Fatih Terim Stadium
- Süper Lig: 5th
- Turkish Cup: Group stage
- UEFA Conference League: League phase
- Top goalscorer: League: Krzysztof Piątek (21); All: Krzysztof Piątek (31)
- Average home league attendance: 2,433
- Biggest win: Başakşehir 6–1 SP La Fiorita
Home colours	Away colours	Third colours

The 2024–25 season was the 35th season in the history of İstanbul Başakşehir, and the 11th consecutive season in the Süper Lig. In addition to the domestic league, the team participated in the Turkish Cup and the UEFA Conference League.

== Transfers ==
=== Out ===
Pos.	Player	Transferred to	Fee	Date	Source
MF	(Turkey) Mahmut Tekdemir		End of contract	1 July 2024	
MF	(Israel) Eden Kartsev	(China) Shenzhen Peng City	Loan	7 July 2024	
FW	(Turkey) Batuhan Çelik	(Turkey) Ümraniyespor	Loan	11 July 2024	
MF	(Serbia) Danijel Aleksić	(Turkey) Konyaspor	Contract termination	7 August 2024	
FW	(Ivory Coast) Mohamed Fofana	(Cyprus) Gençlik Gücü	Contract termination	18 September 2024	

== Friendlies ==
=== Pre-season ===
10 July 2024 Friendly	Železničar Pančevo (Serbia)	1–2	(Turkey) Başakşehir	Stara Pazova, Serbia
18:30 UTC+2	Goal	Report	Pelkas 19'; Aleksić 78'	Stadium: Sportski Centar Fudbalskog saveza Srbije

14 July 2024 Friendly	Vojvodina (Serbia)	1–1	(Turkey) Başakşehir

18 July 2024 Friendly	Başakşehir (Turkey)	0–0	(United Arab Emirates) Ajman

== Competitions ==
=== Overall record ===
Competition	First match	Last match	Starting round	Record							
Competition	First match	Last match	Starting round	Pld	W	D	L	GF	GA	GD	Win %
Süper Lig	12 August 2024	1 June 2025	Matchday 1	2	1	1	0	5	3	+2	50.00
Turkish Cup				0	0	0	0	0	0	+0	—
UEFA Conference League	25 July 2024		Second qualifying round	5	4	1	0	13	1	+12	80.00
Total				7	5	2	0	18	4	+14	71.43

Last updated: 22 August 2024
Source: Soccerway

=== Süper Lig ===
==== League table ====
Pos	Team	Pld	W	D	L	GF	GA	GD	Pts	Qualification or relegation
3	Samsunspor	36	19	7	10	55	41	+14	64	Qualification for the Europa League play-off round (Note: The 2024–25 Turkish Cup winners qualified for the Europa League play-off round. Since the cup winners (Galatasaray) qualified based on league position, the Europa League play-off round spot was passed to the third-placed team, the Europa League second round spot was passed to the fourth-placed team, and the Conference League spot was passed to the fifth-placed team.)
4	Beşiktaş	36	17	11	8	59	36	+23	62	Qualification for the Europa League second qualifying round
5	Başakşehir	36	16	6	14	60	56	+4	54	Qualification for the Conference League second qualifying round
6	Eyüpspor	36	15	8	13	52	47	+5	53	
7	Trabzonspor	36	13	12	11	58	45	+13	51	

Source: Süper Lig
Rules for classification: 1) Points; 2) Head-to-head points; 3) Head-to-head goal difference; 4) Head-to-head goals scored; 5) Goal difference; 6) Goals scored; 7) Play-off.
(Note: Head-to-head record is used only after all the matches between the teams in question have been played)

==== Results summary ====
Overall								Home						Away					
Pld	W	D	L	GF	GA	GD	Pts	W	D	L	GF	GA	GD	W	D	L	GF	GA	GD
15	6	4	5	25	21	+4	22	4	3	0	18	7	+11	2	1	5	7	14	−7

Last updated: 15 December 2024.
Source: Süper Lig

==== Results by round ====
Round	1	2	3	4	5	6	7	8	9	10	11	12	13	14	15	16	17	18	19	20	21	22	23	24	25	26	27	28	29	30	31	32	33	34	35	36	37	38
Ground	A	H	A	H	A	B	A	H	A	H	A	H	A	H	H	A	H	A	H	H	A	H	A	H	B	H	A	H	A	H	A	H	A	A	H	A	H	A
Result	D	W	L	W	W	B	W	D	L	D	L	D	L	W	W	L																						
Position	9	4	6	6	4	5	5	5	6	7	8	8	8	7	7	7																						

Updated to match(es) played on 15 December 2024. Source: TFF.org
A = Away; H = Home; B = Bye; W = Win; D = Draw; L = Loss

==== Matches ====
The match schedule was released on 11 July 2024.

12 August 2024 1	Rizespor	1–1	Başakşehir	Rize
21:00	Aliqulov 45+6'		Figueiredo 39'	Stadium: Rize City Stadium

18 August 2024 2	Başakşehir	4–2	Alanyaspor	Başakşehir
19:15	Piątek 17'; Figueiredo 53'; Türüç 90'; Gürler 90+5'		Córdova 26'; Balkovec 45+3' (pen.)	Stadium: Başakşehir Fatih Terim Stadium

18 September 2024 3	Samsunspor	2–0	İstanbul Başakşehir	Samsun
21:00 EEST	Yavru (yellow card) 34'; Mouandilmadji 65' (yellow card) 76'; Kılınç (yellow card) 68'; van Drongelen 72'; Yüksel (yellow card) 90+3'; Bola (yellow card) 90+6'	Report	Léo Duarte (yellow card) 49'; Özdemir (yellow card) 90+6'	Stadium: Samsun 19 Mayıs Stadium; Attendance: 10,060; Referee: (Turkey) Direnç Tonusluoğlu

19 October 2024 9	Trabzonspor	1–0	İstanbul Başakşehir	Trabzon
16:00 UTC+3	Višća 90+1'	Report	Ba (yellow card) 39'; Kemen (yellow card) 56'; Crespo (yellow card) 73'; Opoku (yellow card) 90+6'	Stadium: Papara Park; Attendance: 14,208; Referee: Zorbay Küçük

28 October 2024 10	İstanbul Başakşehir	1–1	Eyüpspor	Başakşehir
17:00 UTC+3	Opoku 59' (pen.)	Report	Thiam 28'	Stadium: Başakşehir Fatih Terim Stadium; Referee: Abdullah Buğra Taşkınsoy

10 November 2024 12	İstanbul Başakşehir	0–0	Beşiktaş	Başakşehir
19:00 UTC+3	Crespo (yellow card) 45+1'; Opoku (yellow card) 65'; Şengezer (yellow card) 90+2'	Report	Gedson (yellow card) 20'; Svensson (yellow card) 88'; Günok (yellow card) 90+6'	Stadium: Başakşehir Fatih Terim Stadium; Attendance: 4,799; Referee: Turgut Doman

8 December 2024 15	İstanbul Başakşehir	3–0	Hatayspor	Başakşehir
				Stadium: Başakşehir Fatih Terim Stadium

15 December 2024 16	Fenerbahçe	3–1	İstanbul Başakşehir	Istanbul
19:00 TRT (UTC+3)	Džeko 41'; En-Nesyri 74', 90'	Report	Ba (red card) 45+1'; Piątek 59'	Stadium: Şükrü Saracoğlu Stadium; Referee: Ozan Ergün

12 January 2025 19	İstanbul Başakşehir	1–2	Galatasaray	Başakşehir
19:00 TRT (UTC+3)	Opoku (yellow card) 13'; Güreler (yellow card) 37'; Kény (yellow card) 45'; Piątek 53', (yellow card) 74'	Report 1 Report 2 Report 3	Akgün (yellow card) 16'; Ayhan (yellow card) 21'; Torreira (yellow card) 31'; Yılmaz 42', 59'; Sallai (yellow card) 79'	Stadium: Başakşehir Fatih Terim Stadium; Attendance: 7,914; Referee: Atilla Karaoğlan; Assistant referees: İbrahim Bozbey, Ali Can Alp; Fourth official: Ayberk Demirtaş

3 March 2025 26	Istanbul Basaksehir	1–0	Sivasspor	Başakşehir
				Stadium: Başakşehir Fatih Terim Stadium

15 March 2025 28	İstanbul Başakşehir	0–3	Trabzonspor	Başakşehir
				Stadium: Başakşehir Fatih Terim Stadium

9 May 2025 35	İstanbul Başakşehir	1–4	Fenerbahçe	Başakşehir
20:00 TRT (UTC+3)	Şahiner (yellow card) 30'; Beyaz 90+1'	Report	Amrabat (yellow card) 18'; Carlos (yellow card) 24'; Talisca (yellow card) 28'; Müldür 44'; Škriniar 60'; Yüksek (yellow card) 79'; En-Nesyri 86'; Aydın 90+3'	Stadium: Başakşehir Fatih Terim Stadium; Referee: Burak Pakkan

30 May 2025 38	Galatasaray	2–0	İstanbul Başakşehir	Sarıyer
20:00 TRT (UTC+3)	Mertens 17' (pen.); Osimhen (yellow card) 45+2', (goal) 81'; Frankowski (yellow card) 51'	Report 1 Report 2 Report 3	Ba (yellow card) 28'	Stadium: Rams Park; Attendance: 39,738; Referee: Abdullah Buğra Taşkınsoy; Assistant referees: Ceyhun Sesigüzel, Deniz Caner Özaral; Fourth official: Ömer Faruk Gültekin

=== Turkish Cup ===
==== Group stage ====
The draw for the group stage was held on 20 December 2024.

Pos	Team	Pld	W	D	L	GF	GA	GD	Pts	KON	GAL	BAŞ	EYÜ	ÇOR	BOL
1	Konyaspor	3	2	1	0	4	1	+3	7				3–1		
2	Galatasaray	3	1	2	0	6	3	+3	5	0–0		2–2			
3	İstanbul Başakşehir	3	1	2	0	6	3	+3	5					4–1	
4	Eyüpspor	3	1	1	1	2	3	−1	4			0–0			1–0
5	Çorum	3	1	0	2	3	6	−3	3	0–1					2–1
6	Boluspor	3	0	0	3	2	7	−5	0		1–4				

Legend: Blue = home team win; Yellow = draw; Red = away team win.

8 January 2025 1	Galatasaray	2–2	İstanbul Başakşehir	Sarıyer, Istanbul
20:30 TRT (UTC+3)	Torreira (yellow card) 40'; Sánchez (yellow card) 45+2', (goal) 51'; Batshuayi (yellow card) 53', (penalty missed) 90+7; Bardakcı 74'	Report 1 Report 2 Report 3	Türüç 36', (yellow card) 56'; Lima (yellow card) 50'; Piątek 54', (yellow card) 77'; Ergün (yellow card) 79' (yellow-red card) 86'; Şengezer (yellow card) 85'; Kemen (yellow card) 100'	Stadium: Rams Park; Referee: Ali Şansalan; Assistant referees: Mustafa Savranlar, Osman Gökhan Bilir; Fourth official: Batuhan Kolak

4 February 2025 2	İstanbul Başakşehir	4–1	Çorum	Istanbul
15:30	Figueiredo 4', 25', 90+2'; Güreler 49'		Yalçınkaya 39'	Stadium: Başakşehir Fatih Terim

27 February 2025 3	Eyüpspor	0–0	İstanbul Başakşehir	Istanbul
19:00				Stadium: Spoint İnşaat Ümraniyespor

=== UEFA Conference League ===
==== Second qualifying round ====
The draw was held on 19 June 2024.

25 July 2024 First leg	Başakşehir (Turkey)	6–1	(San Marino) SP La Fiorita	Istanbul
20:45 UTC+3	Özcan 5'; Davidson 13'; Figueiredo 29', 49'; Kemen 42'; Piątek 71'		Greco 58'	Stadium: Başakşehir Fatih Terim Stadium; Attendance: 3,814

1 August 2024 Second leg	SP La Fiorita (San Marino)	0–4 (1–10 agg.)	(Turkey) Başakşehir	Serravalle, San Marino
20:45 UTC+2			Piątek 13', 90+1'; Şahiner 31'; Güreler 35'	Stadium: San Marino Stadium; Attendance: 265

==== Third qualifying round ====
8 August 2024 First leg	Iberia (Georgia (country))	0–1	(Turkey) Başakşehir	Tbilisi, Georgia
20:00 UTC+4		Report	Davidson 87'	Stadium: Mikheil Meskhi Stadium; Attendance: 7,880; Referee: David Dickinson (Scotland)

15 August 2024 Second leg	Başakşehir (Turkey)	2–0 (3–0 agg.)	(Georgia (country)) Iberia	Istanbul
20:45 UTC+3	Piątek 50'; Pelkas 61'	Report		Stadium: Başakşehir Fatih Terim Stadium; Attendance: 4,735; Referee: Paweł Raczkowski (Poland)

==== Play-off round ====
22 August 2024 First leg	St Patrick's Athletic (Republic of Ireland)	0–0	(Turkey) Başakşehir	Dublin, Republic of Ireland
19:45 UTC+1				Stadium: Tallaght Stadium; Attendance: 6,064

28 August 2024 Second leg	Başakşehir (Turkey)	2–0 (2–0 agg.)	(Republic of Ireland) St Patrick's Athletic	Istanbul
19:00 UTC+3	Şahiner 64'; Kemen 82'	Report	Bolger (red card) 81'	Stadium: Başakşehir Fatih Terim Stadium; Attendance: 6,223; Referee: Balázs Berke (Hungary)

==== League phase ====
The league phase draw was held on 30 August 2024.

Pos	Team	Pld	W	D	L	GF	GA	GD	Pts	Qualification
24	(Football Association of Serbia) TSC	6	2	1	3	10	13	−3	7	Advance to knockout phase play-offs (unseeded)
25	(Scottish Football Association) Heart of Midlothian	6	2	1	3	6	9	−3	7	
26	(Turkish Football Federation) İstanbul Başakşehir	6	1	3	2	9	12	−3	6	
27	(Football Association of the Czech Republic) Mladá Boleslav	6	2	0	4	7	10	−3	6	
28	(Kazakhstan Football Federation) Astana	6	1	2	3	4	8	−4	5	

Source: UEFA
Rules for classification: League phase tiebreakers

2 October 2024 1	İstanbul Başakşehir (Turkey)	1–2	(Austria) Rapid Wien	Başakşehir Fatih Terim Stadium, Istanbul
16:30 (17:30 UTC+3)	Piątek 45+2'	Report	Schaub 43', 46'	Attendance: 7,622; Referee: Adam Ladebäck (Sweden)

24 October 2024 2	Celje (Slovenia)	5–1	(Turkey) İstanbul Başakşehir	Stadion Z'dežele, Celje
18:45	Svetlin 5'; Brnić 30'; Sešlar 34'; Kučys 51', 77'	Report	Pelkas 75'	Attendance: 2,175; Referee: Oleksiy Derevinskyi (Ukraine)

7 November 2024 3	Copenhagen (Denmark)	2–2	(Turkey) İstanbul Başakşehir	Parken Stadium, Copenhagen
21:00	Chiakha 79', 83'	Report	Kény 26'; Piątek 80'	Attendance: 23,070; Referee: Joey Kooij (Netherlands)

27 November 2024 4	İstanbul Başakşehir (Turkey)	1–1	(Moldova) Petrocub Hîncești	Başakşehir Fatih Terim Stadium, Istanbul
16:30 (18:30 UTC+3)	Piątek 42' (pen.)	Report	Borș 90+6'	Attendance: 4,350; Referee: Genc Nuza (Kosovo)

12 December 2024 5	İstanbul Başakşehir (Turkey)	3–1	(Germany) 1. FC Heidenheim	Başakşehir Fatih Terim Stadium, Istanbul
18:45 (20:45 UTC+3)	Türüç 6'; Crespo 18'; Piątek 68'	Report	Honsak 61'	Attendance: 4,769; Referee: Marco Guida (Italy)

19 December 2024 6	Cercle Brugge (Belgium)	1–1	(Turkey) İstanbul Başakşehir	Jan Breydel Stadium, Bruges
21:00	Brunner 82'	Report	Piątek 74'	Attendance: 4,411; Referee: István Vad (Hungary)
