= Özhan =

Özhan is a masculine given name and surname of Turkish origin. Notable people with the name include:

== Given name ==
- Özhan Canaydın (1943–2010), Turkish businessman and basketballer
- Özhan Çıvgın (born 1979), Turkish basketball coach
- Özhan Öztürk (born 1968), Turkish writer and researcher
- Özhan Pulat (born 1984), Turkish football coach

== Surname ==
- Ahmet Özhan (born 1950), Turkish singer
