= Krzysztof Piątek =

Polish footballer (born 1995)

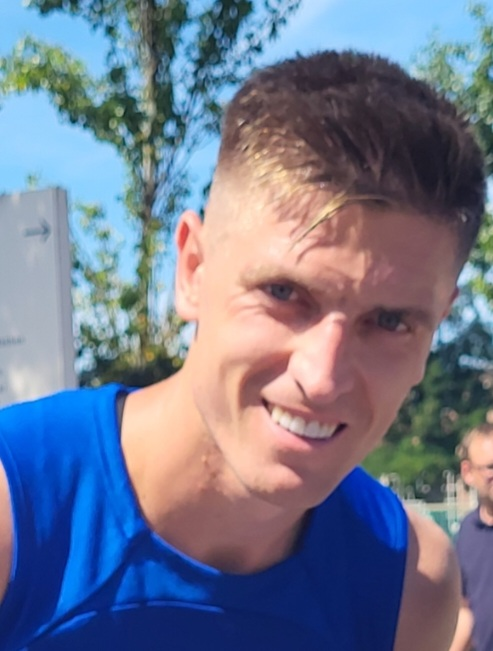
- Piątek with Hertha BSC in 2022

Personal information
- Full name: Krzysztof Piątek
- Date of birth: 1 July 1995 (age 31)
- Place of birth: Dzierżoniów, Poland
- Height: 1.83 m (6 ft 0 in)
- Position: Striker

Team information
- Current team: Al Duhail
- Number: 9

Youth career
- –2006: Niemczanka Niemcza
- 2006–2011: Dziewiątka Dzierżoniów
- 2011–2012: Lechia Dzierżoniów

Senior career*
Years	Team	Apps	(Gls)
2012–2013	Lechia Dzierżoniów	6	(0)
2013–2016	Zagłębie Lubin	72	(15)
2016–2018	Cracovia	63	(32)
2018–2019	Genoa	19	(13)
2019–2020	AC Milan	36	(13)
2020–2023	Hertha BSC	56	(12)
2021–2022	→ Fiorentina (loan)	14	(3)
2022–2023	→ Salernitana (loan)	33	(4)
2023–2025	İstanbul Başakşehir	67	(38)
2025–	Al-Duhail	27	(12)

International career^{‡}
2015–2016	Poland U20	3	(1)
2015–2017	Poland U21	14	(2)
2018–	Poland	39	(12)
- * Club domestic league appearances and goals as of 23:00, 7 November 2026 (UTC) ‡ National team caps and goals as of 21:45, 31 March 2026 (UTC)

Krzysztof Piątek (Polish pronunciation: [ˈkʂɨʂtɔf ˈpjɔntɛk]; born 1 July 1995) is a Polish professional footballer who plays as a striker for Qatar Stars League club Al Duhail and the Poland national team.

Piątek began his professional career with Ekstraklasa club Zagłębie Lubin. Over the course of four seasons, he scored 15 goals in 72 appearances for the team, before joining Cracovia in 2016, for whom he scored 32 goals across two seasons. In 2018, Piątek signed for Genoa in Italy's Serie A. After 19 goals in 21 competitive games in his first half-season, he transferred to AC Milan in January 2019, before signing for Hertha BSC a year later. He then went on loans to Serie A clubs Fiorentina and Salernitana for the subsequent seasons. At the start of the 2023–24 season, he joined İstanbul Başakşehir where, over two seasons, he became the second highest top scorer for the club. In 2025, he moved to Qatari side Al-Duhail SC.

== Club career ==
=== Early career ===
Piątek began his career with local side Niemczanka Niemcza and Dziewiątka Dzierżoniów (2006–2011). He then moved to Lechia Dzierżoniów of III liga in 2011.

=== Zagłębie Lubin ===
Piątek signed for Zagłębie Lubin in 2013 and initially played in junior and reserve teams of the club. After the arrival of Piotr Stokowiec as the new coach, however, he was quickly promoted to the first team on 14 May 2014 and then made his Ekstraklasa debut on 18 May 2014 in a match against Cracovia. Over the course of the next season, he became a regular starter for Zagłębie, who played in I liga, the second tier of Polish football. He scored his first senior career goal on 12 September 2014 in a 1–0 win to Chrobry Głogów and his first brace on 31 October 2014 at Widzew Łódź. After earning promotion with the club, Piątek scored his first league goal on 14 August 2015 in a 2–1 win against Lech Poznań and helped the team finish third in the 2015–16 Ekstraklasa season, earning a medal and qualifying for European competitions for the first time in club's history since the championship winning team of 2006–07.

He played a total number of 85 matches for Zagłębie and scored 18 times, including appearances in the Polish Cup and UEFA Europa League qualifying stages.

=== Cracovia ===
In 2016, Piątek joined fellow Polish side Cracovia and over the course of the next two seasons, he scored 32 league goals in 65 appearances for the club. That tally included a haul of 21 goals during his second season which saw him end the 2017–18 Ekstraklasa campaign as the third top goalscorer in Poland.

=== Genoa ===
On 8 June 2018, Piątek signed a four-year contract with Italian club Genoa for a reported fee of €4 million. He scored four goals, including a hat-trick in the opening 19 minutes, on debut in a 4–0 Coppa Italia win over Lecce. He made his Serie A debut on 26 August, scoring in the opening six minutes of the match in a 2–1 win over Empoli. The following week, he scored his first brace of the season in a 5–3 loss to Sassuolo, which was followed by another strike in a 4–1 loss to Lazio, thus becoming the first player since Andriy Shevchenko in 1999 to score five goals in his first four Serie A appearances.

During his following match, a 2–0 victory over Chievo, he scored his 10th goal across all competitions and in the process became the first player across Europe's major leagues to reach the milestone for the season. On 30 September, Piątek scored a brace inside three minutes in a 2–1 win over Frosinone to make it 8 goals in six matches, the best start to a season by a debutant since Karl Aage Hansen in the 1949–50 campaign. In his very next match, he became the first player since Gabriel Batistuta in the 1994–95 season to score in each of his first seven Serie A appearances when he netted in a 3–1 defeat to Parma.

=== AC Milan ===
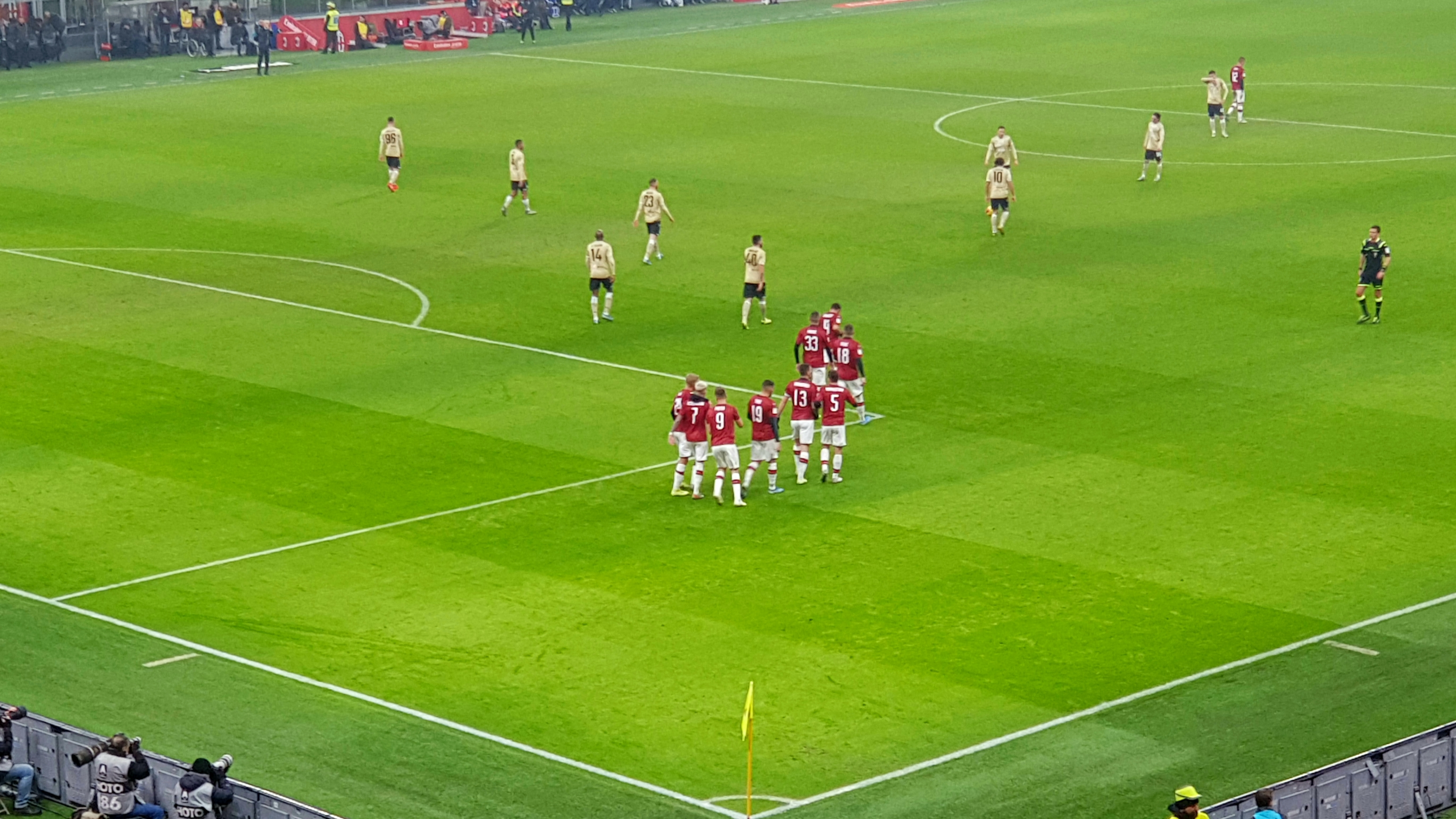
Piątek (with number 9) at AC Milan in 2020

On 23 January 2019, AC Milan announced the signing of Piątek on a contract lasting until 30 June 2023, for a reported fee of €35 million. He was signed as a replacement for Gonzalo Higuaín, who joined Chelsea, and he was assigned the number 19 shirt, previously worn by Leonardo Bonucci.

Piątek made his debut for Milan on 26 January, in a goalless home draw against Napoli, as a 71st-minute substitute for Patrick Cutrone. Three days later against the same opponents also at San Siro, he scored both goals in a 2–0 win in the Coppa Italia quarter-finals, and was given a standing ovation when he made way for Cutrone. On 3 February, Piątek scored his first league goal away to Roma, which ended 1–1. He then scored three goals in the next two consecutive matches: one against Cagliari Calcio and two against Atalanta, becoming the first Milan player to score in his first three starts in the league since Mario Balotelli in 2013.

Ahead of the 2019–20 Serie A season, Piątek switched to the number 9 shirt. He scored four league goals in the first half of the season before leaving the club.

=== Hertha BSC ===
In January 2020, Hertha BSC announced the signing of Piątek for a reported fee of €27 million, on a long-term contract. He was given the number 7 jersey. He made his debut for the club on 31 January by coming off the bench in a goalless draw against Schalke 04. He scored his first goal for Hertha on 4 February in a 3-2 defeat to Schalke in DFB-Pokal. Piątek scored his first Bundesliga goal on 28 February by converting a penalty in a 3-3 draw against Fortuna Düsseldorf. On 27 May, he converted another penalty, this time in a 2-2 draw against RB Leipzig.

Piątek scored his first goal in the 2020-21 Bundesliga season on 7 November, in a 3-0 win over Augsburg. On 4 December Piątek scored a brace within 3 minutes to give Hertha a 3-1 win over Union Berlin. On 12 May, during a 2-1 win over Schalke 04, he sustained a fractured ankle, an injury that ruled him out until September.

On 25 September, Piątek returned from injury as he came off the bench in a 6-0 loss to RB Leipzig. One week later, he scored in a 2-1 loss to Freiburg. That was his final goal for the club.

==== Loan to Fiorentina ====
On 8 January 2022, Piątek returned to Italy and joined Fiorentina on loan. On 13 January, he made his debut for the club by coming off the bench in a 5-2 win over Napoli in Coppa Italia round of 16. On 10 February, Piątek scored a brace in a 3-2 win over Atalanta Bergamo in Coppa Italia quarter final. Four days later, he scored his first league goal for Fiorentina in a 2-1 win over Spezia. On 20 February, Piątek scored the only goal in a win over Atalanta.

Piątek finished that Serie A season with 14 appearances and 3 goals for Fiorentina, helping the club to qualify for the 2022-23 UEFA Europa Conference League play-off round.

==== Loan to Salernitana ====
On 1 September 2022, Piątek joined Salernitana on loan with an option to buy.

=== İstanbul Başakşehir ===
On 18 July 2023, Piątek signed for Turkish club İstanbul Başakşehir on a three-year contract. Piątek scored his first hat-trick for İstanbul Başakşehir on 28 January 2024 against Konyaspor during an away match, coming from 0–2 behind, Başakşehir eventually won the match 3–2. He ended the season with another hat-trick, in a 6–2 win over Adana Demirspor on 26 May 2024. In the 2023–24 season, he scored 17 goals in 34 Süper Lig appearances, making him the club's best goalscorer in the league and joint fifth overall. On 12 December 2024, he netted a goal and provided an assist in a Conference League group stage match, which concluded in Başakşehir's 3–1 victory over FC Heidenheim.

=== Al-Duhail ===
On 3 June 2025, he joined Qatar Stars League club Al-Duhail on a permanent deal for a reported transfer fee of €10 million. With the move, Piątek's cumulative transfer figure grew to €76.5 million, making him the most expensive Polish player of all time, ahead of Arkadiusz Milik at €58 million and Robert Lewandowski at €54 million.

== International career ==
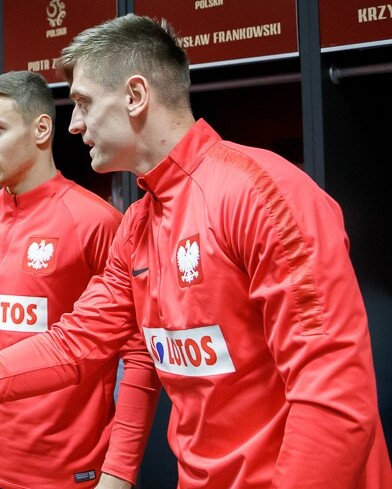
Piątek with Poland in 2019

Despite having not debuted for the Polish senior squad, Piątek was included in Poland's preliminary 35-man squad for the 2018 FIFA World Cup, but was one of 12 players cut from the final team. Piątek's international debut came on 11 September 2018, starting in a 1–1 friendly draw with the Republic of Ireland in Wrocław and making way for Mateusz Klich after 61 minutes. Exactly one month later, he made his competitive debut in a UEFA Nations League match against Portugal and scored the opening goal in a 3–2 defeat. Regarded as an important player for the national team and ready to play alongside Robert Lewandowski and Arkadiusz Milik in an attacking trio, Piątek was forced to miss the postponed UEFA Euro 2020 due to ankle injury in May 2021 that required surgery and months of rehabilitation. On 10 November 2022, Piątek was included in Poland's 2022 FIFA World Cup squad, making two group stage appearances as a substitute. On 7 June 2024, he was named in the final 26-man squad for UEFA Euro 2024. On 21 June, in Poland's second game of the tournament, he levelled the score in the 30th minute of a 1–3 loss to Austria.

== Style of play ==
Piątek has been described as a "classic" "number 9" striker most efficient inside the opponent's penalty area, courtesy of his excellent positioning, accurate finishing, height, physical strength, and tenacity in aerial or physical challenges with opponents. His team play outside the penalty area and playmaking abilities have been cited as areas in need of improvement, however.

During his time in Genoa, Piątek played in a 3–5–2 formation as a main striker, usually on the left, most often supported by Christian Kouamé, a pacey forward with excellent dribbling and passing skills. In Milan, he became a lone striker in a 4–3–3 formation, supported by wingers on either side of the pitch.

Piątek has named Harry Kane and Robert Lewandowski as his two favourite strikers who he wishes to emulate. He has also cited Cristiano Ronaldo and Thierry Henry as his childhood inspirations.

== Personal life ==
He is married to Paulina Procyk. The wedding took place on 1 June 2019 in Castle of the Order of St. John in Łagów (Lubusz Voivodeship).

He is called by fans as "Il Pistolero" (the Gunslinger) due to his habit of Wild West celebration of gun-firing, associated with the 19th century United States.

== Career statistics ==
=== Club ===
As of match played 7 November 2026

Appearances and goals by club, season and competition
Club	Season	League			National cup (Note: Includes Polish Cup, Coppa Italia, DFB-Pokal, Turkish Cup, Amir of Qatar Cup)		Continental		Other		Total	
Club	Season	Division	Apps	Goals	Apps	Goals	Apps	Goals	Apps	Goals	Apps	Goals
Lechia Dzierżoniów	2012–13	III liga, gr. E	6	0	—		—		—		6	0
Zagłębie Lubin	2013–14	Ekstraklasa	4	0	0	0	—		—		4	0
Zagłębie Lubin	2014–15	I liga	30	8	3	1	—		—		33	9
Zagłębie Lubin	2015–16	Ekstraklasa	33	6	3	2	—		—		36	8
Zagłębie Lubin	2016–17	Ekstraklasa	5	1	1	0	6 (Note: Appearances in UEFA Europa League)	0	—		12	1
Zagłębie Lubin	Total		72	15	7	3	6	0	—		85	18
Cracovia	2016–17	Ekstraklasa	27	11	—		—		—		27	11
Cracovia	2017–18	Ekstraklasa	36	21	2	0	—		—		38	21
Cracovia	Total		63	32	2	0	—		—		65	32
Genoa	2018–19	Serie A	19	13	2	6	—		—		21	19
AC Milan	2018–19	Serie A	18	9	3	2	—		—		21	11
AC Milan	2019–20	Serie A	18	4	2	1	—		—		20	5
AC Milan	Total		36	13	5	3	—		—		41	16
Hertha BSC	2019–20	Bundesliga	15	4	1	1	—		—		16	5
Hertha BSC	2020–21	Bundesliga	32	7	0	0	—		—		32	7
Hertha BSC	2021–22	Bundesliga	9	1	1	0	—		—		10	1
Hertha BSC	Total		56	12	2	1	—		—		58	13
Fiorentina (loan)	2021–22	Serie A	14	3	4	3	—		—		18	6
Salernitana (loan)	2022–23	Serie A	33	4	0	0	—		—		33	4
İstanbul Başakşehir	2023–24	Süper Lig	34	17	2	0	—		—		36	17
İstanbul Başakşehir	2024–25	Süper Lig	33	21	3	1	12 (Note: Appearances in UEFA Conference League)	9	—		48	31
İstanbul Başakşehir	Total		67	38	5	1	12	9	—		84	48
Al-Duhail	2025–26	Qatar Stars League	22	9	3	3	10 (Note: Appearances in AFC Champions League Elite)	5	1 (Note: Appearance in UAE–Qatar Super Cup Series)	0	36	17
Al-Duhail	2026–27	Qatar Stars League	5	3	0	0	—		5 (Note: Two appearances and one goal in QSL Cup, three appearances in GFF Gulf Club Champions League)	1	10	4
Al-Duhail	Total		27	12	3	3	10	5	6	1	46	21
Career total			393	142	30	20	28	14	6	1	457	177

=== International ===
As of match played 31 March 2026

Appearances and goals by national team and year
National team	Year	Apps	Goals
Poland	2018	2	1
Poland	2019	8	4
Poland	2020	5	2
Poland	2021	6	2
Poland	2022	6	2
Poland	2024	6	1
Poland	2025	5	0
Poland	2026	1	0
Total		39	12

As of match played 21 June 2024. Poland score listed first, score column indicates score after each Piątek goal.

International goals by date, venue, cap, opponent, score, result and competition
No.	Date	Venue	Cap	Opponent	Score	Result	Competition
1	11 October 2018	Silesian Stadium, Chorzów, Poland	2	Portugal	1–0	2–3	2018–19 UEFA Nations League A
2	21 March 2019	Ernst-Happel-Stadion, Vienna, Austria	3	Austria	1–0	1–0	UEFA Euro 2020 qualifying
3	7 June 2019	Philip II Arena, Skopje, North Macedonia	5	North Macedonia	1–0	1–0	UEFA Euro 2020 qualifying
4	10 June 2019	Stadion Narodowy, Warsaw, Poland	6	Israel	1–0	4–0	UEFA Euro 2020 qualifying
5	16 November 2019	Teddy Stadium, Jerusalem, Israel	10	Israel	2–0	2–1	UEFA Euro 2020 qualifying
6	7 October 2020	Gdańsk Stadium, Gdańsk, Poland	12	Finland	4–0	5–1	Friendly
7	11 November 2020	Silesian Stadium, Chorzów, Poland	14	Ukraine	1–0	2–0	Friendly
8	25 March 2021	Puskás Aréna, Budapest, Hungary	16	Hungary	1–2	3–3	2022 FIFA World Cup qualification
9	9 October 2021	Stadion Narodowy, Warsaw, Poland	19	San Marino	5–0	5–0	2022 FIFA World Cup qualification
10	24 March 2022	Hampden Park, Glasgow, Scotland	22	Scotland	1–1	1–1	Friendly
11	16 November 2022	Polish Army Stadium, Warsaw, Poland	25	Chile	1–0	1–0	Friendly
12	21 June 2024	Olympiastadion, Berlin, Germany	30	Austria	1–1	1–3	UEFA Euro 2024

== Honours ==
Zagłębie Lublin

- I liga: 2014–15

Individual

- Ekstraklasa Player of the Month: April 2018
