= Miguel Crespo =

Portuguese footballer (born 1996)

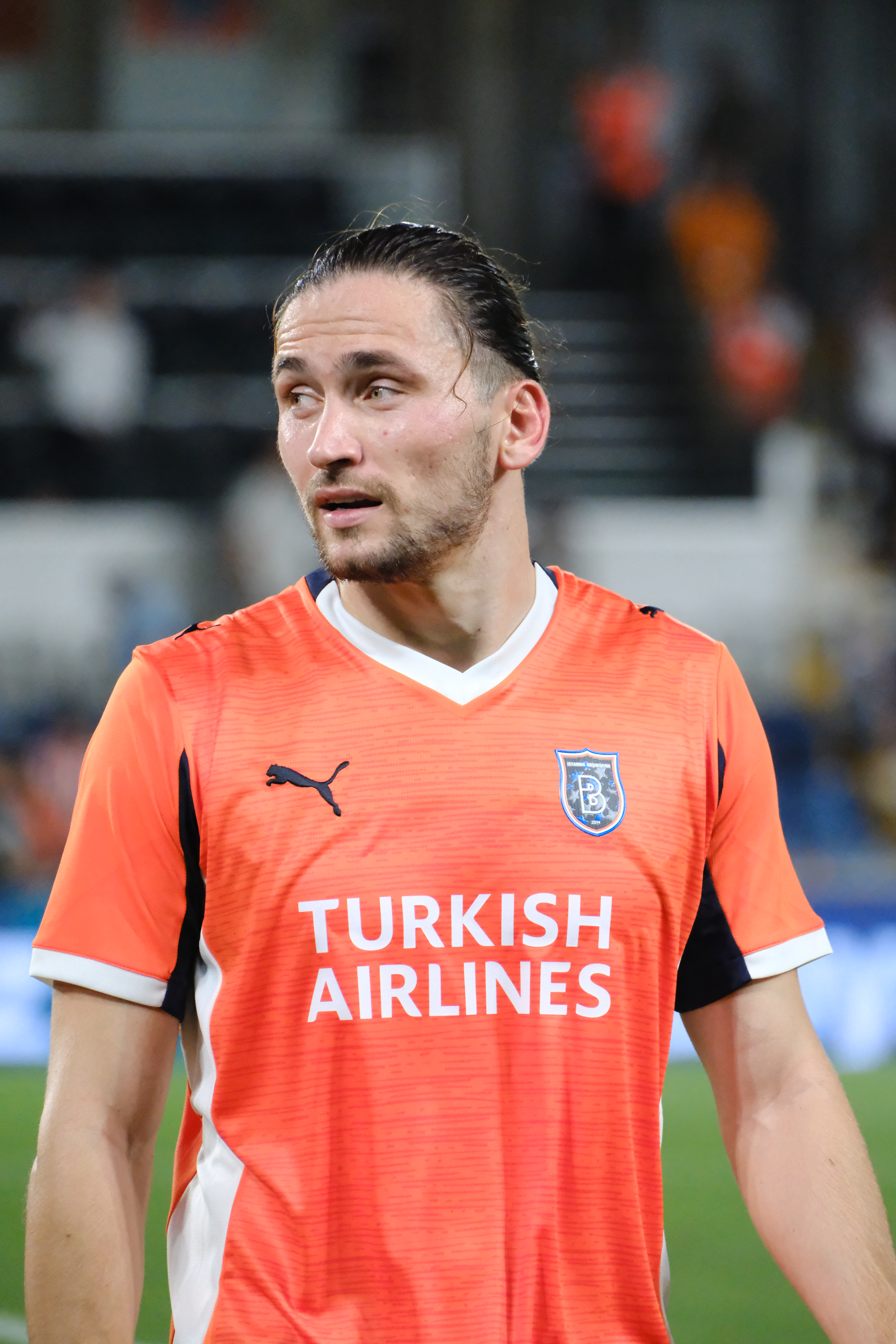
- Miguel Crespo, 2025

Personal information
- Full name: Miguel Crespo da Silva
- Date of birth: 11 September 1996 (age 30)
- Place of birth: Lyon, France
- Height: 1.86 m (6 ft 1 in)
- Position: Midfielder

Team information
- Current team: Al-Khaleej
- Number: 19

Youth career
- 2005–2007: Escola Luciano Sousa
- 2007–2009: Porto
- 2009–2010: Escola Luciano Sousa
- 2010–2012: Artur Rego
- 2012–2013: Barroselas
- 2013–2014: Feirense
- 2014–2015: Neves

Senior career*
Years	Team	Apps	(Gls)
2014–2016	Neves	62	(18)
2016–2017	Merelinense	32	(9)
2017–2019	Braga B	51	(3)
2019–2021	Estoril	47	(7)
2021–2024	Fenerbahçe	56	(4)
2024	→ Rayo Vallecano (loan)	15	(0)
2024–2026	İstanbul Başakşehir	48	(2)
2026–	Al-Khaleej	8	(0)
- * Club domestic league appearances and goals as of 15 October 2026

Miguel Crespo da Silva (born 11 September 1996) is a Portuguese professional footballer who plays as a midfielder for Saudi Pro League club Al-Khaleej.

== Club career ==
=== Braga ===
Born in Lyon, France to Portuguese parents, Crespo was raised in Viana do Castelo. He spent part of his youth in FC Porto's academy, and his first four seasons as a senior in lower league or amateur football, starting with Neves FC in the Viana do Castelo Football Association's district championship. On 12 June 2017 he signed with S.C. Braga, being assigned to the reserve side in the LigaPro.

Crespo made his debut as a professional on 19 August 2017, starting in a 0–2 home loss against C.D. Santa Clara. He scored his first goal in the league later that month, in the 2–2 home draw with Leixões SC.

=== Estoril ===
Crespo joined fellow second-tier club G.D. Estoril Praia in July 2019, agreeing to a three-year contract. First choice from 2020–21 onwards, he scored six goals in all competitions during the campaign as his team returned to the Primeira Liga after three years as champions.

On 13 August 2021, Crespo played his first match in the Portuguese top division, a 0–0 home draw against Vitória de Guimarães. He scored for the first time two weeks later, opening the 2–1 win over C.S. Marítimo also at the Estádio António Coimbra da Mota.

=== Fenerbahçe ===
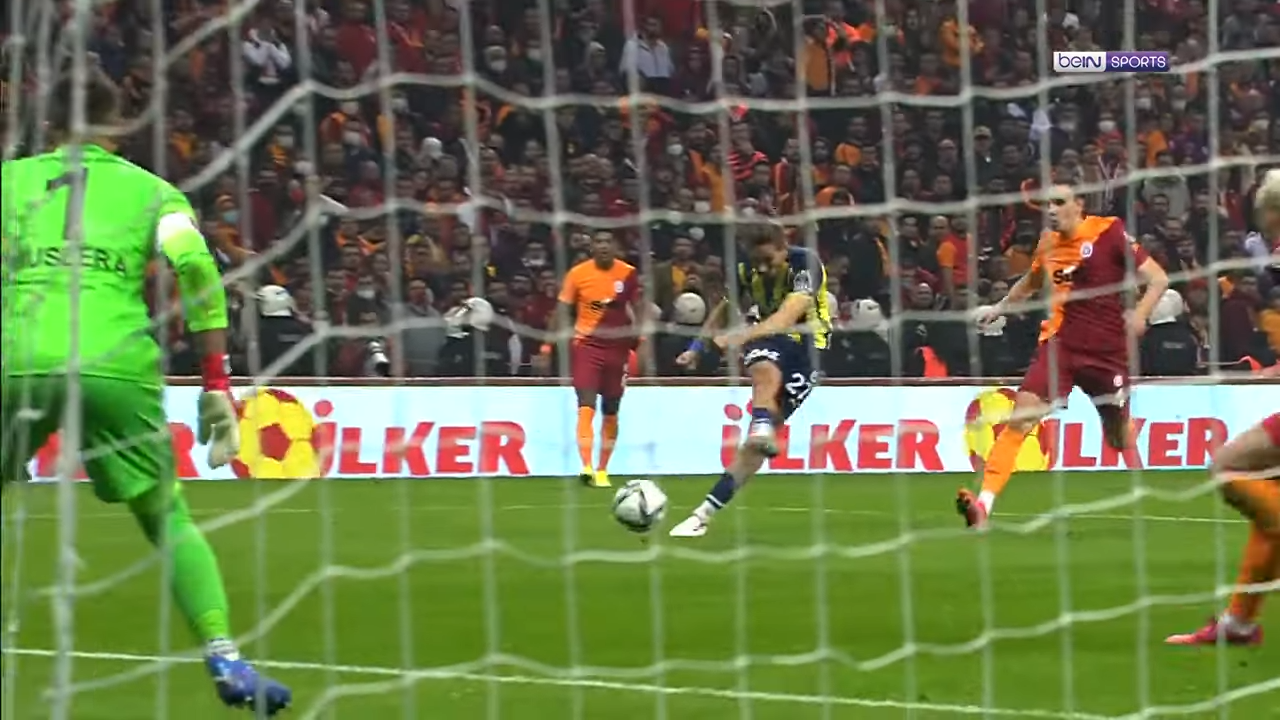
Crespo scoring against Istanbul rivals Galatasaray in November 2021

Crespo moved to Fenerbahçe S.K. of the Turkish Süper Lig on a three-year deal on 6 September 2021, with the possibility of a one-year extension. His only goal of his first season – in which the team came runners-up under compatriot manager Vítor Pereira – decided a 2–1 win at Istanbul rivals Galatasaray S.K. in the fourth minute of added time on 21 November.

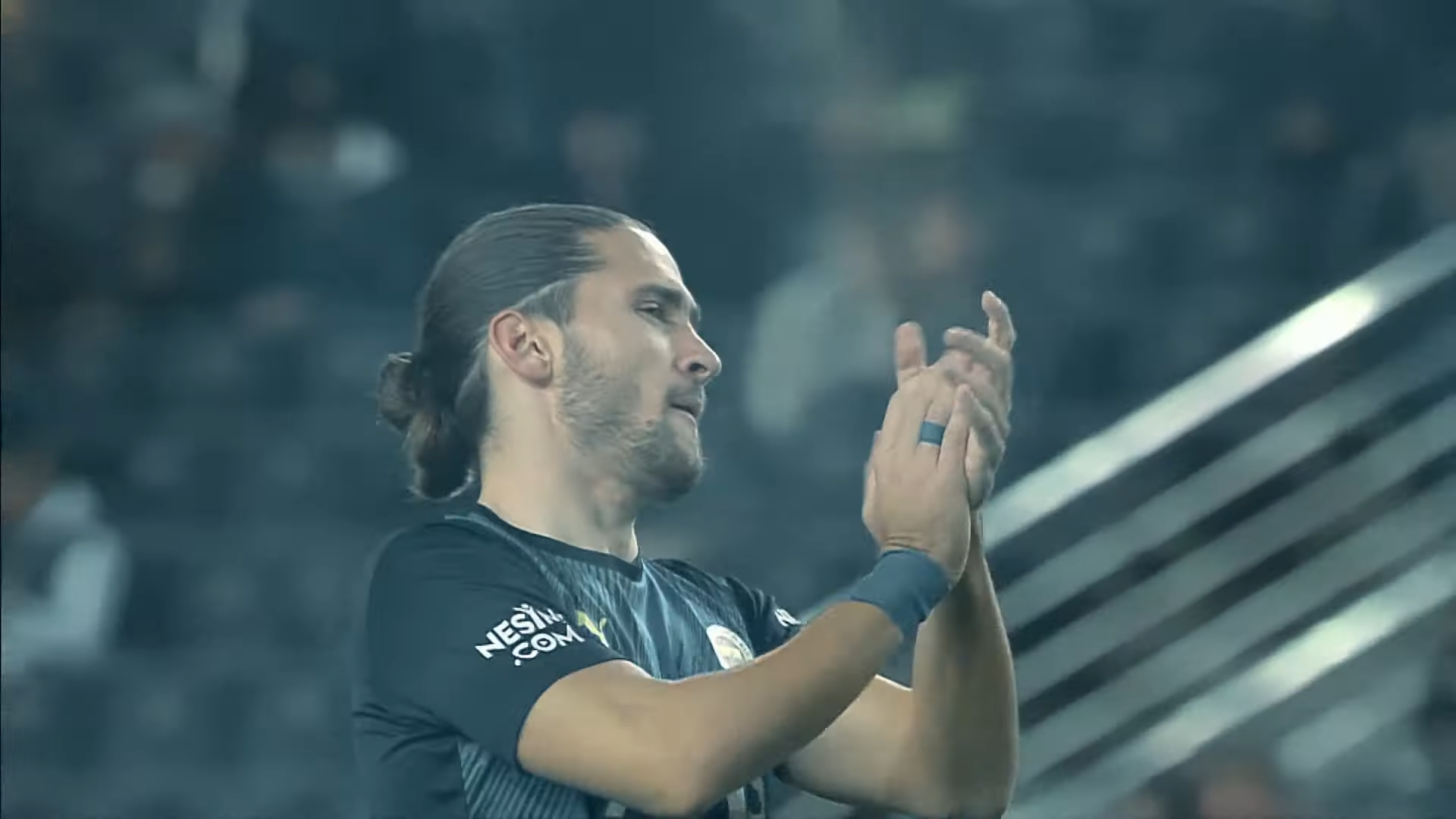
Crespo with Fenerbahçe in 2022

In his second year at the Şükrü Saracoğlu Stadium, under another Portuguese manager, Jorge Jesus, Crespo remained a key part of the squad. He made his debut in continental football on 27 July 2022, as a second-half substitute in the 1–2 home defeat to FC Dynamo Kyiv in the second qualifying round of the UEFA Champions League. He contributed three appearances as the club won the Turkish Cup on 11 June 2023, but was not selected for the final as he had previously agreed to get married on the same date; due to the same reason, his teammate Joshua King was also not picked.

On 2 October 2023, Crespo renewed his contract until 30 June 2025. The following 31 January, he joined Rayo Vallecano on loan with an option to buy. He made his La Liga debut later that day, featuring 26 minutes in a 2–1 away loss against Atlético Madrid.

=== İstanbul Başakşehir ===
On 19 August 2024, Crespo signed a three-year contract with İstanbul Başakşehir F.K. also of the Turkish top flight.

== International career ==
After missing out on selection for Portugal at the 2022 FIFA World Cup, Crespo said he would evaluate any approach by Turkey.

== Career statistics ==
As of matches played 18 May 2025

Appearances and goals by club, season and competition
Club	Season	League			Cup (Note: Includes Taça de Portugal, Turkish Cup and Turkish Super Cup)		Europe		Other		Total	
Club	Season	Division	Apps	Goals	Apps	Goals	Apps	Goals	Apps	Goals	Apps	Goals
Neves	2015–16	Campeonato de Portugal	25	4	0	0	—		—		25	4
Merelinense	2016–17	Campeonato de Portugal	32	9	2	0	—		—		34	9
Braga B	2017–18	Liga Portugal 2	21	1	0	0	—		—		21	1
Braga B	2018–19	Liga Portugal 2	30	2	0	0	—		—		30	2
Braga B	Total		51	3	0	0	0	0	0	0	51	3
Estoril	2019–20	Liga Portugal 2	14	1	1	0	—		—		15	1
Estoril	2020–21	Liga Portugal 2	30	5	7	1	—		—		37	6
Estoril	2021–22	Primeira Liga	3	1	2	1	—		—		5	2
Estoril	Total		47	7	10	2	0	0	0	0	57	9
Fenerbahçe	2021–22	Süper Lig	25	1	2	0	0	0	—		27	1
Fenerbahçe	2022–23	Süper Lig	21	3	3	0	11 (Note: One appearance in UEFA Champions League, ten appearances in UEFA Europa League)	0	—		35	3
Fenerbahçe	2023–24	Süper Lig	10	0	0	0	8 (Note: Appearances in UEFA Europa Conference League)	1	0	0	18	1
Fenerbahçe	Total		56	4	5	0	19	1	0	0	80	5
Rayo Vallecano (loan)	2023–24	La Liga	15	0	0	0	—		—		15	0
İstanbul Başakşehir	2024–25	Süper Lig	29	2	2	0	6	1	—		37	3
Career total			255	29	19	2	25	2	0	0	299	33

== Honours ==
Estoril

- Liga Portugal 2: 2020–21

Fenerbahçe

- Turkish Cup: 2022–23
