= Aksa Power Generation =

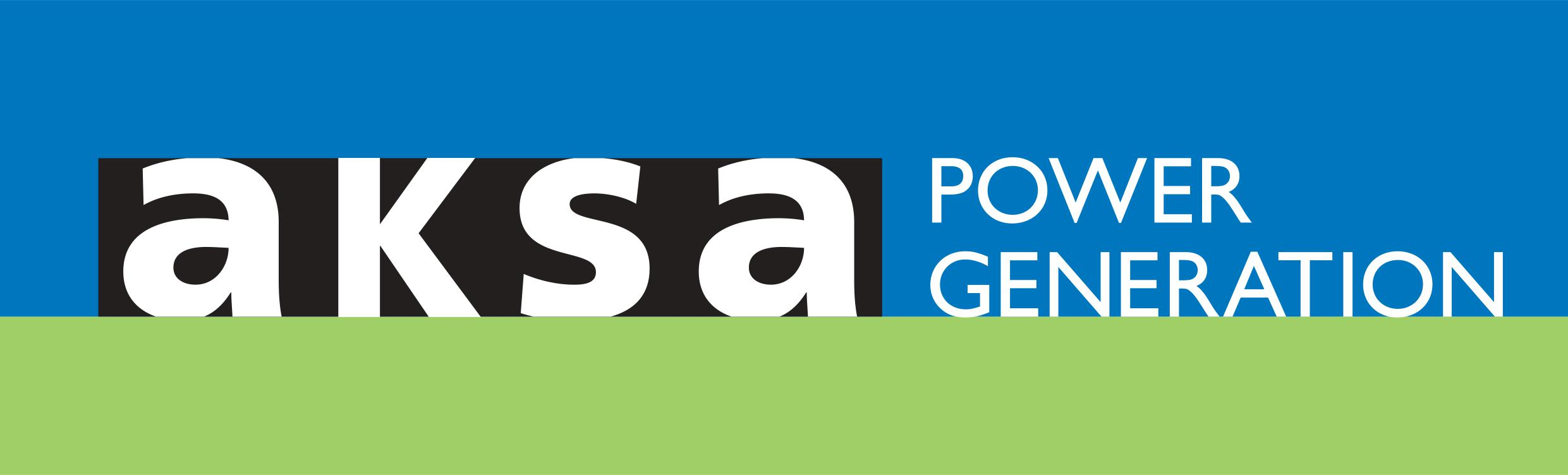
- Type: Private
- Industry: Energy
- Founded: 1968
- Founder: Ali Metin Kazanci
- Headquarters: Beykoz, Istanbul, Turkey
- Products: Electric generators
- Owner: Kazancı Holding
- Website: www.aksa.com.tr

Aksa Power Generation (or Aksa Jeneratör Sanayi A.Ş.) is a Turkish corporation, (part of the Aksa Group and owned by Kazanci Holding) that designs, manufactures, distributes, sells and services electrical power generators worldwide. The Aksa Power Generation headquarters is located in Istanbul, Turkey. It has three main manufacturing plants around the world, which are located in three continents (Louisiana, USA; Istanbul, Turkey; and China).

Aksa Power Generation claims to be one of the world's top five generator manufacturing firms and runs the world's largest generator factory.

== History ==
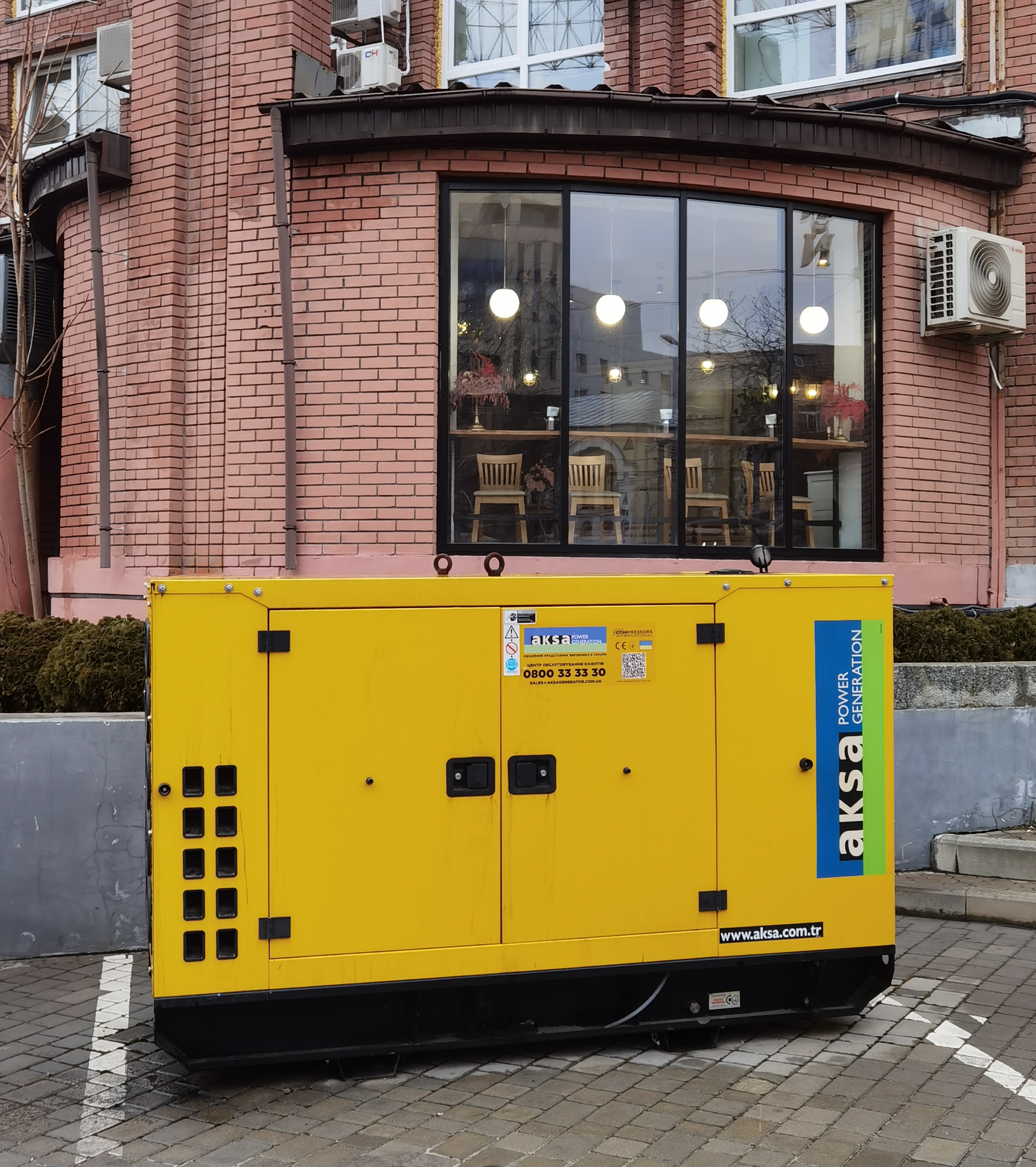
Aksa generator in Dnipro, Ukraine during war and shortages of electricity.

Aksa Power Generation is a Turkish corporation, originating in 1968 as an electrical motor company by its founder Ali Metin Kazanci. Aksa manufactured its first industrial generator engine-generator in 1984. In 1994, Aksa Power Generation became one of 8 corporations under the Kazanci Holding. Aksa Power Generation is among the largest 200 exporter companies in Turkey.

In 2007, Aksa began selling to the Chinese market. It has opened three generator manufacturing plants in China (Changzhou, Wuxi and Hangzhou) with its Hangzhou State plant (opened 2012) making 24,000 generators per year and being the largest generator factory in the world. Aksa were sponsors of the FIFA Under 20 World Cup in 2013, providing the power.

== Products ==
Aksa Power Generation manufactures about 40,000 industrial generators per year. Most common engines used for gen-sets are Cummins, John Deere, Mitsubishi, Perkins, Lister Petter and Doosan and alternators are MeccAlte and Stamford. Aksa also manufactures soundproofed generator cabins-canopy kit, lighting towers, power transfer switching and synchronization panels with its related equipment.
