= Davidson (footballer) =

Brazilian footballer (born 1991)

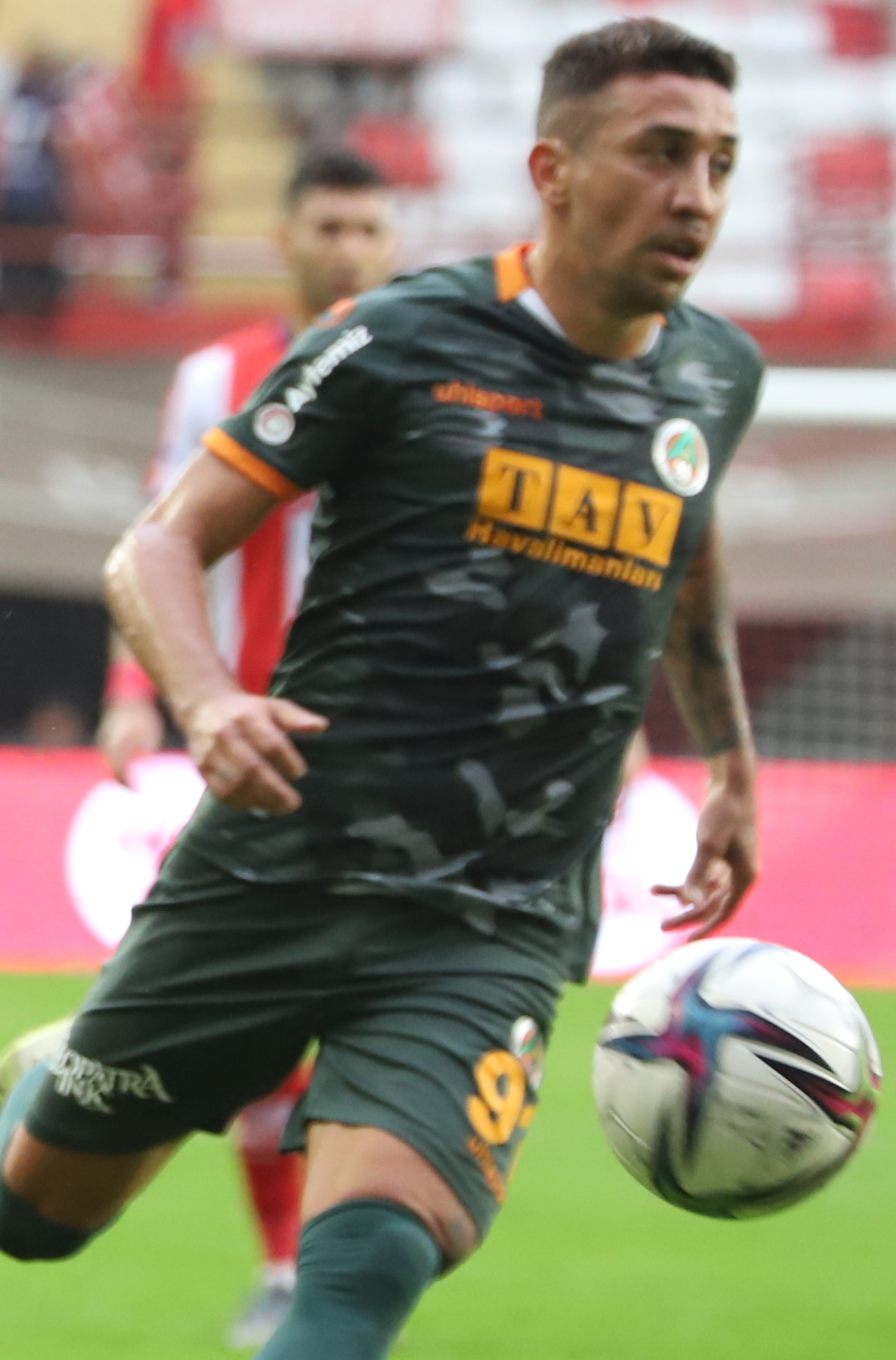
- Davidson with Alanyaspor in 2021

Personal information
- Full name: Davidson da Luz Pereira
- Date of birth: 5 March 1991 (age 35)
- Place of birth: Duque de Caxias, Brazil
- Height: 1.77 m (5 ft 10 in)
- Position: Winger

Team information
- Current team: Qingdao West Coast
- Number: 11

Youth career
- Santos
- Fluminense
- 2011–2013: Sport Recife

Senior career*
Years	Team	Apps	(Gls)
2013	Sport Recife	0	(0)
2013	→ Porto-PE (loan)	6	(0)
2014	Galícia	16	(6)
2014	Fortaleza	4	(0)
2015	Jacobina	7	(1)
2015	Santa Rita	5	(0)
2015–2016	Sporting Covilhã	58	(11)
2016–2018	Chaves	48	(6)
2018–2020	Vitória Guimarães	60	(13)
2020–2022	Alanyaspor	61	(17)
2022–2023	Wuhan Three Towns	59	(24)
2024–2025	İstanbul Başakşehir	33	(6)
2025–	Qingdao West Coast	58	(17)
- * Club domestic league appearances and goals as of 8 November 2026

Davidson da Luz Pereira (born 5 March 1991), simply known as Davidson, is a Brazilian professional footballer who plays as a winger for Chinese Super League club Qingdao West Coast.

== Career ==
In 2018, Davidson signed for Vitória Guimarães.

On 7 February 2024, Davidson returned to Turkey and signed a with Süper Lig club İstanbul Başakşehir.

== Career statistics ==
As of match played 8 November 2026

Appearances and goals by club, season and competition
Club	Season	League			State League		National cup		League cup		Continental		Other		Total	
Club	Season	Division	Apps	Goals	Apps	Goals	Apps	Goals	Apps	Goals	Apps	Goals	Apps	Goals	Apps	Goals
Porto-PE	2013	Pernambucano	—		6 (Note: Appearances in Campeonato Pernambucano)	0	—		—		—		—		6	0
Galícia	2014	Baiano	—		16 (Note: Appearances in Campeonato Baiano)	6	—		—		—		—		16	6
Fortaleza	2014	Série C	4	0	—		—		—		—		—		4	0
Jacobina	2015	Baiano	—		7	1	—		—		—		—		7	1
Santa Rita	2015	Alagoano	—		5 (Note: Appearances in Campeonato Alagoano)	0	—		—		—		—		5	0
Sporting Covilhã	2015–16	LigaPro	39	8	—		1	0	0	0	—		—		40	8
Sporting Covilhã	2016–17	LigaPro	19	3	—		4	2	4	0	—		—		27	5
Sporting Covilhã	Total		58	11	—		5	2	4	0	—		—		67	13
Chaves	2016–17	Primeira Liga	15	1	—		3	0	0	0	—		—		18	1
Chaves	2017–18	Primeira Liga	33	5	—		1	0	1	0	—		—		35	5
Chaves	Total		48	6	—		4	0	1	0	—		—		53	6
Vitória Guimarães	2018–19	Primeira Liga	34	8	—		4	2	1	0	—		—		39	10
Vitória Guimarães	2019–20	Primeira Liga	26	5	—		1	1	5	2	12 (Note: Appearances in UEFA Europa League)	2	—		44	10
Vitória Guimarães	Total		60	13	—		5	3	6	2	12	2	—		83	20
Alanyaspor	2020–21	Süper Lig	39	11	—		3	1	—		1	0	—		43	12
Alanyaspor	2021–22	Süper Lig	22	6	—		0	0	—		—		—		22	6
Alanyaspor	Total		61	17	—		3	1	—		1	0	—		65	18
Wuhan Three Towns	2022	Chinese Super League	33	18	—		0	0	—		—		—		33	18
Wuhan Three Towns	2023	Chinese Super League	26	6	—		0	0	—		6 (Note: Appearances in AFC Champions League)	2	1 (Note: Appearances in Chinese Super Cup)	0	33	8
Wuhan Three Towns	Total		59	24	—		0	0	—		6	2	1	0	66	26
İstanbul Başakşehir	2023–24	Süper Lig	14	4	—		1	0	—		—		—		15	4
İstanbul Başakşehir	2024–25	Süper Lig	19	3	—		2	0	—		12 (Note: Appearances in UEFA Conference League)	2	—		33	5
İstanbul Başakşehir	Total		33	7	—		3	0	—		12	2	—		48	9
Qingdao West Coast	2025	Chinese Super League	28	8	—		3	2	—		—		—		31	10
Qingdao West Coast	2026	Chinese Super League	30	9	—		1	0	—		—		—		31	9
Qingdao West Coast	Total		58	17	—		4	2	—		—		—		62	19
Career total			381	95	34	7	24	6	12	2	31	6	1	0	483	116

== Honours ==
Wuhan Three Towns

- Chinese Super League: 2022
- Chinese FA Super Cup: 2023

Individual

- Primeira Liga Goal of the Month: August 2019
