= Hamza Güreler =

Turkish footballer (born 2006)

Personal information
- Full name: Hamza Güreler
- Date of birth: 10 April 2006 (age 20)
- Place of birth: Bayrampaşa, Turkey
- Height: 1.92 m (6 ft 4 in)
- Position: Centre-back

Team information
- Current team: İstanbul Başakşehir
- Number: 15

Youth career
- 2015–2017: Genç Yıldızlar SK
- 2017–2018: Beşiktaş
- 2018–2019: Dağyenice
- 2019–2024: İstanbul Başakşehir

Senior career*
Years	Team	Apps	(Gls)
2024–	İstanbul Başakşehir	36	(1)

International career^{‡}
2024	Turkey U19	5	(1)
2024–	Turkey U21	3	(0)
- * Club domestic league appearances and goals as of 10 June 2026 ‡ National team caps and goals as of 22:22, 19 November 2024 (UTC)

Hamza Güreler (born 10 April 2006) is a Turkish footballer currently playing as a defender for İstanbul Başakşehir.

== Club career ==
Güreler is a youth product of Genç Yıldızlar SK, Beşiktaş, Dağyenice and İstanbul Başakşehir. On 13 October 2023, he signed his first professional contract with İstanbul Başakşehir. He made his senior and professional debut with İstanbul Başakşehir in a 3–2 Süper Lig win over Konyaspor on 28 January 2024.

== International career ==
Güreler is a youth international for Turkey, and was called up to the Turkey U21s in September 2024. In March 2026 while he was in the Turkey U21s camp, Güreler received an emergency call-up to the Turkey senior squad for the training squad against Romania.
