= Özhan Pulat =

Turkish football coach

Personal information
- Date of birth: 30 September 1984 (age 42)
- Place of birth: Bursa, Turkey

Managerial career
- Years: Team
- 2019: Kastamonuspor 1966
- 2023: Adanaspor
- 2024: Hatayspor
- 2026: Eyüpspor

Özhan Pulat (born 30 September 1984) is a Turkish football coach who was most recently head coach of Eyüpspor.
