= 2022–23 Kasımpaşa S.K. season =

Kasımpaşa S.K.
2022–23 season
- Owner: Turgay Ciner
- President: Mehmet Fatih Saraç
- Manager: Sami Uğurlu (until 16 August 2022); Şenol Can (from 17 August 2022 to 11 November 2022); Selçuk İnan (from 22 November 2022 to 18 March 2023); Kemal Özdeş (from 4 April 2023)
- Stadium: Recep Tayyip Erdoğan Stadium
- Süper Lig: 10th
- Turkish Cup: Fifth round
- Top goalscorer: League: Mamadou Fall (8 goals); All: Mamadou Fall (9 goals)
Home colours	Away colours	Third colours

The 2022–23 season was the 101st season in the existence of Kasımpaşa S.K. and the club's 10th consecutive season in the top flight of Turkish football. In addition to the domestic league, Kasımpaşa S.K. participated in this season's edition of the Turkish Cup. The season covers the period from 1 July 2022 to 30 June 2023.

== Players ==
=== First-team squad ===
As of 3 September 2022

Note: Flags indicate national team as defined under FIFA eligibility rules; some limited exceptions apply. Players may hold more than one non-FIFA nationality.

No.	Pos.	Nation	Player
1	GK	TUR	Ertuğrul Taşkıran
4	DF	SUR	Ryan Donk
5	DF	NED	Jeffrey Bruma
6	DF	BIH	Daniel Graovac
7	FW	SEN	Mamadou Fall
8	FW	TUR	Tunay Torun
10	MF	BIH	Haris Hajradinović
11	FW	TUR	Yunus Mallı
12	DF	TUN	Mortadha Ben Ouanes
13	MF	FRA	Valentin Eysseric
14	MF	TUR	Oğuzhan Efe Yılmaz
15	DF	TUR	Tarkan Serbest
17	MF	GER	Ahmet Engin
18	DF	TUR	Sadık Çiftpınar
19	FW	CMR	Stéphane Bahoken

No.	Pos.	Nation	Player
20	MF	TUR	Erdem Çetinkaya
22	GK	GER	Erdem Canpolat
23	DF	TUR	Feyzi Yıldırım
24	DF	BEL	Mickaël Tirpan
28	DF	ITA	Raoul Petretta
35	MF	TUR	Aytac Kara
41	FW	MKD	Berat Kalkan
58	DF	TUR	Yasin Özcan
59	MF	KOS	Bersant Celina (on loan from Dijon)
67	GK	TUR	Enes Sari
81	MF	TUR	Turgay Gemicibaşi
88	MF	TUR	Anıl Özcelik
94	DF	KOS	Florent Hadergjonaj
99	MF	TUR	Ali Demirel

=== Out on loan ===
Note: Flags indicate national team as defined under FIFA eligibility rules; some limited exceptions apply. Players may hold more than one non-FIFA nationality.

No.	Pos.	Nation	Player
—	GK	TUR	Enes Sarı (at Bayrampaşa)
—	GK	TUR	Murat Can Yıldız (at 24 Erzincanspor)
—	DF	TUR	Berk Çetin (at Dornbirn)
—	DF	TUR	Onur Ural (at Iskenderunspor)
—	MF	HUN	Kevin Varga (at Young Boys)

No.	Pos.	Nation	Player
—	FW	TUR	Ahmet Demirli (at Belediye Derince Spor)
—	FW	TUR	Ethem Erboğa (at Hekimoğlu Trabzon)
—	FW	TUR	Hasan Bilal (at Diyarbakirspor)
—	FW	TUR	Yasin Dülger (at Sanliurfaspor)
—	FW	TUR	Furkan Külekci (at Kirikkale Büyük Anadolu Spor)

== Pre-season and friendlies ==
Win Draw Loss Fixtures

30 July 2022 Friendly	Kasımpaşa (Turkey)	1–1	(Turkey) Pendikspor	Istanbul
20:00 TRT (UTC+3)	Hadergjonaj 79' (pen.)		Regattin 20' (pen.)	Stadium: Recep Tayyip Erdoğan Stadium

6 December 2022 Friendly	Kasımpaşa (Turkey)	3–1	(Turkey) İstanbulspor	Istanbul
13:30 TRT (UTC+3)	Bahoken 43'; Kara 60'; Fall 74'		Ethemi 45'	Stadium: Kasımpaşaspor Kemerburgaz Tesisleri

10 December 2022 Friendly	Trabzonspor (Turkey)	1–1	(Turkey) Kasımpaşa	İzmit
18:00 TRT (UTC+3)	Bozok 16'		Hadergjonaj 82' (pen.)	Stadium: Kocaeli Stadium

== Competitions ==
=== Overall record ===
Competition	First match	Last match	Starting round	Final position	Record							
Competition	First match	Last match	Starting round	Final position	Pld	W	D	L	GF	GA	GD	Win %
Süper Lig	8 August 2022	6 June 2023	Matchday 1	10th	36	12	7	17	45	61	−16	33.33
Turkish Cup	18 October 2022	20 December 2022	Third round	Fifth round	3	2	0	1	9	4	+5	66.67
Total					39	14	7	18	54	65	−11	35.90

Source: Soccerway

=== Süper Lig ===
==== League table ====
Pos	Team	Pld	W	D	L	GF	GA	GD	Pts
8	Konyaspor	36	12	15	9	49	41	+8	51
9	Kayserispor	36	15	5	16	55	61	−6	47 (Note: Reduction of 3 points by decision of the Turkish Federation.)
10	Kasımpaşa	36	12	7	17	45	61	−16	43
11	Ankaragücü	36	12	6	18	43	53	−10	42
12	İstanbulspor	36	12	5	19	47	63	−16	41 (Note: Head-to-head points: İstanbulspor 11, Antalyaspor 10, Sivasspor 8, Alanyaspor 4.)

Source: Süper Lig
Rules for classification: 1) Points; 2) Head-to-head points; 3) Head-to-head goal difference; 4) Head-to-head goals scored; 5) Goal difference; 6) Goals scored; 7) Play-off.

==== Results summary ====
Overall								Home						Away					
Pld	W	D	L	GF	GA	GD	Pts	W	D	L	GF	GA	GD	W	D	L	GF	GA	GD
36	12	7	17	45	61	−16	43	7	3	8	29	33	−4	5	4	9	16	28	−12

Source: Spor Toto Süper Lig

==== Results by round ====
Round	1	2	3	4	5	6	7	8	9	10	11	12	13	14	15	16	17	18	19	20	21	22	23	24	25	26	27	28	29	30	31	32	33	34	35	36	37	38
Ground	A	H	A	H	A	H	A	H	A	H	H	A	H		H	A	H	A	H	H	A	H	A	H	A	H	A	H	A	A	H	A		A	H	A	H	A
Result	L	L	L	W	W	L	W	W	D	L	L	D	D	B	L	L	W	L	D	L	L	W	L	W	L	D	W	W	L	D	L	D	B	W	W	W	L	L
Position	19	19	19	15	12	13	10	9	9	10	11	11	12	13	15	15	13	15	15	15	16	14	16	13	14	13	11	11	12	12	14	14	15	13	11	10	10	10

Source: Spor Toto Süper Lig
A = Away; H = Home; B = Bye; W = Win; D = Draw; L = Loss

==== Matches ====
The league schedule was released on 4 July.

8 August 2022 1	İstanbul Başakşehir	4–0	Kasımpaşa	Istanbul
19:15 TRT (UTC+3)	Tekdemir (yellow card) 13'; Aleksić 22'; Ndayishimiye (yellow card) 23'; Szysz 38'; Chouiar 74'; Türüç 77' (pen.)	Report	Hajradinović (yellow card) 15'; Özcan (yellow card) 51'; Petretta (yellow card) 76'	Stadium: Fatih Terim Stadium; Attendance: 1,849; Referee: Ali Palabıyık

15 August 2022 2	Kasımpaşa	0–6	Fenerbahçe	Istanbul
21:45 TRT (UTC+3)	Yeşilyurt (red card) 16'; Hadergjonaj (yellow card) 21'; Hajradinović (yellow card) 42'; Bahoken (yellow card) 54'	Report	King 8'; Valencia 34', 58'; Kadıoğlu (yellow card) 42'; Mor 45+3'; Güler 86', 90+2'	Stadium: Recep Tayyip Erdoğan Stadium; Attendance: 4,811; Referee: Mete Kalkavan

20 August 2022 3	Giresunspor	1–0	Kasımpaşa	Giresun
19:15 TRT (UTC+3)	Mejía (yellow card) 6'; Bilazer (yellow card) 38'; Pérez (yellow card) 86'; Bajić 90'	Report	Yıldırım (yellow card) 13'; Gemicibaşı (yellow card) 41'	Stadium: Çotanak Sports Complex; Attendance: 7,098; Referee: Bahattin Şimşek

28 August 2022 4	Kasımpaşa	1–0	Hatayspor	Istanbul
19:15 TRT (UTC+3)	Hajradinović 36'; Eysseric (yellow card) 59'; Engin (yellow card) 90+2'; Fall (yellow card) 90+4'	Report	Yılmaz (yellow card) 81'	Stadium: Recep Tayyip Erdoğan Stadium; Attendance: 1,776; Referee: Mert Güzenge

4 September 2022 5	Antalyaspor	0–2	Kasımpaşa	Antalya
21:45 TRT (UTC+3)	Özmert (yellow card) 86'; Vural (yellow card) 88'; Fredy (red card) 90+7'	Report	Gemicibaşi (yellow card) 20'; Ben Ouanes (yellow card) 29'; Hadergjonaj 45+6' (pen.); Celina (yellow card) 57'; Sertel 61' (o.g.); Hajradinović (yellow card) 80'; Engin (yellow card) 90+10'	Stadium: Antalya Stadium; Attendance: 8,490; Referee: Kadir Sağlam

11 September 2022 6	Kasımpaşa	2–3	Galatasaray	Istanbul
20:00 TRT (UTC+3)	Eysseric (yellow card) 5'; Bahoken 16'; Çiftpınar 90'; Kara (yellow card) 90+4'	Report	Gomis 20'; Aktürkoğlu 50', 69'	Stadium: Recep Tayyip Erdoğan Stadium; Attendance: 6,261; Referee: Volkan Bayarslan

17 September 2022 7	Ümraniyespor	1–2	Kasımpaşa	Istanbul
17:00 TRT (UTC+3)	Geraldo (yellow card) 60'; Yılmaz (yellow card) 81'; Sackey (yellow card) 85'; Glumac (yellow card) 90+2'; Mršić 90+9'	Report	Fall (yellow card) 25'; Tırpan (yellow card) 27'; Hadergjonaj 36' (pen.) (yellow card) 53'; Ouanes (yellow card) 59'; Bahoken 83'	Stadium: Necmi Kadıoğlu Stadium; Attendance: 329; Referee: Suat Arslanboğa

1 October 2022 8	Kasımpaşa	1–0	Gaziantep	Istanbul
14:30 TRT (UTC+3)	Çiftpınar (yellow card) 43'; Eysseric (yellow card) 45+1'; Celina 57'	Report	Sagal (yellow card) 45+5'; Marković (yellow card) 55'	Stadium: Recep Tayyip Erdoğan Stadium; Attendance: 1,529; Referee: Zorbay Küçük

10 October 2022 9	Trabzonspor	0–0	Kasımpaşa	Trabzon
20:00 TRT (UTC+3)	Bakasetas (yellow card) 51'	Report	Tırpan (yellow card) 53'; Eysseric (yellow card) 67'; Çiftpınar (yellow card) 90+4'	Stadium: Şenol Güneş Sports Complex; Attendance: 25,455; Referee: Hüseyin Göçek

15 October 2022 10	Kasımpaşa	1–4	Adana Demirspor	Istanbul
17:00 TRT (UTC+3)	Tırpan (yellow card) 29'; Bahoken 56'	Report	Akaydin (yellow card) 32'; Belhanda 37'; Akintola 40'; Onyekuru (yellow card) 45+3' (goal) 63'; Özbir (yellow card) 57'; Ndiaye 86'	Stadium: Recep Tayyip Erdoğan Stadium; Attendance: 1,533; Referee: Tugay Kaan Numanoğlu

23 October 2022 11	Kasımpaşa	0–1	Kayserispor	Istanbul
14:30 TRT (UTC+3)	Ouanes (yellow card) 47'; Çiftpınar (yellow card) 51'	Report	Thiam 43'; Hosseini (yellow card) 69'	Stadium: Recep Tayyip Erdoğan Stadium; Attendance: 1,954; Referee: Mustafa Kürşad Filiz

29 October 2022 12	Konyaspor	1–1	Kasımpaşa	Konya
14:30 TRT (UTC+3)	Oğuz (yellow card) 60'; Guilherme 82'; Demirtaş (yellow card) 87'; Ikpeazu (yellow card) 90+7'	Report	Ouanes (yellow card) 30'; Hajradinović 50' (yellow card) 81'; Taşkıran (yellow card) 90+4'; Koita (yellow card) 90+10'	Stadium: Konya Metropolitan Municipality Stadium; Attendance: 10,193; Referee: Atilla Karaoğlan

4 November 2022 13	Kasımpaşa	1–1	Ankaragücü	Istanbul
20:00 TRT (UTC+3)	Koita 58' (yellow card) 90+7'	Report	Chatzigiovanis 85' (yellow card) 85'; Malcuit (yellow card) 90+2'	Stadium: Recep Tayyip Erdoğan Stadium; Attendance: 2,222; Referee: Ümit Öztürk

14	Bye

24 December 2022 15	Kasımpaşa	1–2	Sivasspor	Istanbul
16:00 TRT (UTC+3)	Fall (yellow card) 21'; Ouanes 39' (yellow card) 74'; Petretta (yellow card) 64'; Hajradinović (yellow card) 90+10'	Report	Saba 14' (yellow card) 90+6'; Charisis (yellow card) 49'; Gradel 65'	Stadium: Recep Tayyip Erdoğan Stadium; Attendance: 1,372; Referee: Sarper Barış Saka

28 December 2022 16	İstanbulspor	2–1	Kasımpaşa	Istanbul
17:00 TRT (UTC+3)	Ethemi 29'; Yılmaz (yellow card) 49'; Sarıkaya (yellow card) 63'; Gültekin 78'	Report	Petretta 25' (yellow card) 62'; Tırpan (yellow card) 38'; Serbest (yellow card) 49'; Bruma (yellow card) 51'	Stadium: Necmi Kadıoğlu Stadium; Attendance: 295; Referee: Suat Arslanboğa

4 January 2023 17	Kasımpaşa	4–1	Alanyaspor	Istanbul
17:00 TRT (UTC+3)	Ouanes 11' (yellow card) 25'; Fall 32', 83'; Eysseric 67'; Bahoken (yellow card) 80'	Report	Hassan 90+1'	Stadium: Recep Tayyip Erdoğan Stadium; Attendance: 727; Referee: Yasin Kol

7 January 2023 18	Beşiktaş	2–1	Kasımpaşa	Istanbul
19:00 TRT (UTC+3)	Tosun 28'; Weghorst 45+6'; Welinton (yellow card) 53'; Salih Uçan (yellow card) 81'	Report	Hajradinović (yellow card) 33'; Fall (yellow card) 33'; Donk (yellow card) 48'; Engin 69'; Petretta (yellow card) 77'	Stadium: Vodafone Park; Attendance: 29,077; Referee: Zorbay Küçük

15 January 2023 19	Kasımpaşa	2–2	Fatih Karagümrük	Istanbul
16:00 TRT (UTC+3)	Hadergjonaj 30' (pen.); Tırpan (yellow card) 60'; Graovac (yellow card) 65'; Bahoken (yellow card) 90' (goal) 90+10'	Report	Drešević 51'; Borini 62'; Colley (yellow card) 77'; Uğur (yellow card) 90+4'	Stadium: Recep Tayyip Erdoğan Stadium; Attendance: 2,887; Referee: Çağdaş Altay

21 January 2023 20	Kasımpaşa	1–3	İstanbul Başakşehir	Istanbul
16:00 TRT (UTC+3)	Özcan 16'; Hajradinović (yellow card) 36'; Ouanes (yellow card) 47' (yellow card) 90+8' (red card); Kalkan (yellow card) 85'; Kara (yellow card) 90+7'; Eysseric (yellow card) 90+11'	Report	Aleksić 48'; Tekdemir (yellow card) 72'; Türüç 90+9' (pen.); Szysz 90+11'	Stadium: Recep Tayyip Erdoğan Stadium; Attendance: 1,910; Referee: Turgut Doman

29 January 2023 21	Fenerbahçe	5–1	Kasımpaşa	Istanbul
19:00 TRT (UTC+3)	Valencia 37' (pen.), 39', 52', 59'; Güler (yellow card) 45'; Crespo (yellow card) 89'; Batshuayi 90+2'	Report	Donk (yellow card) 10'; Fall 24'; Tırpan (yellow card) 26'; Kara (yellow card) 90'; Çiftpınar (yellow card) 90+5'	Stadium: Şükrü Saracoğlu Stadium; Attendance: 38,030; Referee: Volkan Bayarslan

1 February 2023 22	Kasımpaşa	5–1	Giresunspor	Istanbul
17:00 TRT (UTC+3)	Fall 14'; Kara (yellow card) 15' (goal) 45+4' (pen.), 66'; Eysseric (yellow card) 17' (goal) 29' (pen.); Ouanes 50'	Report	Savićević 10'; Bilazer (yellow card) 45+3'; Mejía (yellow card) 58'	Stadium: Recep Tayyip Erdoğan Stadium; Referee: Hüseyin Göçek

5 February 2023 23	Hatayspor	1–0	Kasımpaşa	Hatay
16:00 TRT (UTC+3)	Zé Luís (yellow card) 39'; Ribeiro (yellow card) 64'; Atsu 90+7'	Report	Eysseric (yellow card) 63'; Tırpan (yellow card) 64'; Koita (yellow card) 90+1'	Stadium: New Hatay Stadium; Referee: Murat Erdoğan

6 March 2023 24	Kasımpaşa	3–1	Antalyaspor	Istanbul
20:00 TRT (UTC+3)	Chouiar 22', (yellow card) 44'; Koita 39'; Eysseric (yellow card) 45+2'; Malsa 60'	Report	Fernando 45' (pen.), (yellow card) 90+4'	Stadium: Recep Tayyip Erdoğan Stadium; Referee: Cihan Aydın

11 March 2023 25	Galatasaray	1–0	Kasımpaşa	Istanbul
19:00 TRT (UTC+3)	Torreira (yellow card) 47'; Zaniolo 57' (yellow card) 90+4'; Nelsson (yellow card) 75'	Report	Malsa (yellow card) 44'; Tırpan (yellow card) 50'	Stadium: Nef Stadium; Referee: Atilla Karaoğlan

18 March 2023 26	Kasımpaşa	1–1	Ümraniyespor	Istanbul
13:30 TRT (UTC+3)	Fall 29'; Eysseric (yellow card) 79'	Report	Mršić 41' (pen.); Göksu (yellow card) 87'	Stadium: Recep Tayyip Erdoğan Stadium; Referee: Mustafa Kürşad Filiz

27	Gaziantep	0–3 (w/o)	Kasımpaşa	Gaziantep
		Report		Stadium: Gaziantep Stadium

8 April 2023 28	Kasımpaşa	2–0	Trabzonspor	Istanbul
20:30 TRT (UTC+3)	Chouiar 29'; Eysseric 76' (pen.)	Report		Stadium: Recep Tayyip Erdoğan Stadium; Referee: Burak Şeker

15 April 2023 29	Adana Demirspor	5–0	Kasımpaşa	Adana
16:00 TRT (UTC+3)	Akintola 18', 21'; Sarı 27'; Morel (yellow card) 51'; Güler (yellow card) 54'; Ndiaye 80'; Belhanda 90' (pen.)	Report	Özcan (yellow card) 19'; Djilobodji (yellow card) 25'; Fabiano (yellow card) 84'	Stadium: New Adana Stadium; Referee: Ümit Öztürk

19 April 2023 30	Kayserispor	0–0	Kasımpaşa	Kayseri
17:00 TRT (UTC+3)	Kemen (yellow card) 12'	Report	Koita (yellow card) 11'; Tırpan (yellow card) 30'; Djilobodji (red card) 90+3'	Stadium: Kadir Has Stadium; Referee: Hüseyin Göçek

23 April 2023 31	Kasımpaşa	1–2	Konyaspor	Istanbul
13:30 TRT (UTC+3)	Fall 13', (yellow card) 22'; Fabiano (yellow card) 59'	Report	Calvo 30'; Diouf 45+6'; Moreno (yellow card) 60'	Stadium: Recep Tayyip Erdoğan Stadium; Referee: Yasin Kol

30 April 2023 32	Ankaragücü	0–0	Kasımpaşa	Ankara
16:00 TRT (UTC+3)	Malcuit (yellow card) 69'	Report	Hadergjonaj (yellow card) 19'; Kara (yellow card) 65'	Stadium: Eryaman Stadium; Referee: Bahattin Şimşek

33	Bye

16 May 2023 34	Sivasspor	1–2	Kasımpaşa	Sivas
17:00 TRT (UTC+3)	Goutas (yellow card) 21'; Fredrik Ulvestad (yellow card) 45+2'; Yeşilyurt (yellow card) 90+1'; Gökay 90+7'	Report	Ben Ouanes 68', (yellow card) 78'; Fall 85'; Güvenç (red card) 90+1'	Stadium: New Sivas 4 Eylül Stadium; Referee: Ali Şansalan

20 May 2023 35	Kasımpaşa	1–0	İstanbulspor	Istanbul
16:00 TRT (UTC+3)	Özcan (yellow card) 48', (goal) 58'; Fall (yellow card) 65'	Report	Duhaney (yellow card) 90+2'	Stadium: Recep Tayyip Erdoğan Stadium; Referee: Yaşar Kemal Uğurlu

30 May 2023 36	Alanyaspor	1–3	Kasımpaşa	Antalya
20:00 TRT (UTC+3)	Doumbia (yellow card) 47'; Aydın 49'	Report	Eysseric (yellow card) 41'; Djilobodji 59'; Koita 65'; Fall 78'	Stadium: Kırbıyık Holding Stadium; Referee: Cihan Aydın

3 June 2023 37	Kasımpaşa	2–5	Beşiktaş	Istanbul
19:00 TRT (UTC+3)	Hajradinović (yellow card) 45+1'; Kara 62'; Donk 86'; Djilobodji (yellow card) 90+11'	Report	Welinton (yellow card) 11'; Fernandes 20'; Tosun 29'; Aboubakar 49'; Bingöl 79'; Masuaku (yellow card) 83'; Vardar (yellow card) 90+2'; Hutchinson 90+13' (pen.)	Stadium: Recep Tayyip Erdoğan Stadium; Referee: Volkan Bayarslan

6 June 2023 38	Fatih Karagümrük	3–0	Kasımpaşa	Istanbul
17:00 TRT (UTC+3)	Lobzhanidze 13'; Bertolacci (yellow card) 34'; Diagne 67', 82', (yellow card) 82'; Feghouli (yellow card) 72'	Report	Özcan (yellow card) 47'	Stadium: Atatürk Olympic Stadium; Referee: Burak Şeker

=== Turkish Cup ===
18 October 2022 Third round	Kasımpaşa	2–1 (a.e.t.)	Yeni Mersin İdmanyurdu	Istanbul
13:00 TRT (UTC+3)	Demirel 80'; Dilli (yellow card) 93'; Kalkan (yellow card) 103'; Tırpan 113'	Report	Beytaş 30'; Erdoğan (yellow card) 75'; Evren (yellow card) 105'	Stadium: Recep Tayyip Erdoğan Stadium; Referee: Muhammet Ali Metoğlu

8 November 2022 Fourth round	Kasımpaşa	6–1	1461 Trabzon	Istanbul
13:00 TRT (UTC+3)	Demirel 7', 41'; Kara 8', 32'; Hajradinović 26'; Fall 66'	Report	Morkaya (yellow card) 41'; Yıldırım 88'	Stadium: Recep Tayyip Erdoğan Stadium; Referee: Alper Akarsu

20 December 2022 Fifth round	Kasımpaşa	1–2	Ümraniyespor	Istanbul
13:00 TRT (UTC+3)	Graovac (yellow card) 58'; Petretta (yellow card) 81'; Mallı 88'	Report	Mršić 59' (pen.); Mimaroğlu 86'; Nayir (yellow card) 89'	Stadium: Recep Tayyip Erdoğan Stadium; Referee: Ali Palabıyık
