= 2023–24 Kasımpaşa S.K. season =

Kasımpaşa S.K.
2023–24 season
- President: Mehmet Fatih Saraç
- Manager: Kemal Özdeş
- Stadium: Recep Tayyip Erdoğan Stadium
- Süper Lig: 5th
- Turkish Cup: Fifth round
- Top goalscorer: League: Aytaç Kara (8); All: Aytaç Kara (8)
Home colours	Away colours	Third colours

The 2023–24 season was Kasımpaşa S.K.'s 103rd season in existence and 12th consecutive in the Süper Lig. They also competed in the Turkish Cup.

== Players ==
=== First-team squad ===
As of 30 August 2023

Note: Flags indicate national team as defined under FIFA eligibility rules; some limited exceptions apply. Players may hold more than one non-FIFA nationality.

No.	Pos.	Nation	Player
1	GK	GRE	Andreas Gianniotis
2	DF	BRA	Cláudio Winck
3	DF	TUR	Duhan Aksu
4	DF	NGR	Kenneth Omeruo
5	DF	TUR	Sadık Çiftpınar
6	DF	TUR	Gökhan Gül
7	MF	SEN	Mamadou Fall
10	MF	BIH	Haris Hajradinović (captain)
11	FW	TUR	Erdem Çetinkaya
12	DF	TUN	Mortadha Ben Ouanes
13	DF	TUN	Adnan Aktaş
17	MF	NED	Dries Saddiki
20	MF	TUR	Selim Dilli

No.	Pos.	Nation	Player
25	GK	TUR	Ali Emre Yanar
29	DF	TUR	Taylan Utku Aydın
35	MF	TUR	Aytaç Kara
41	FW	MKD	Berat Kalkan
42	MF	TUR	Emirhan Yiğit
58	DF	TUR	Yasin Özcan
80	MF	TUR	Hasan Emre Yeşilyurt
97	FW	FRA	Iron Gomis
98	GK	TUR	Murat Can Yıldız
99	MF	TUR	Ali Demirel
—	DF	BEL	Mickaël Tırpan
—	FW	CMR	Stéphane Bahoken

=== Out on loan ===
Note: Flags indicate national team as defined under FIFA eligibility rules; some limited exceptions apply. Players may hold more than one non-FIFA nationality.

No.	Pos.	Nation	Player
—	MF	TUR	Yasin Eratilla (at Ayvalıkgücü Belediyespor until 30 June 2024)
—	MF	TUR	Oğuzhan Yılmaz (at Ankaraspor until 30 June 2024)
—	FW	TUR	Furkan Külekçi (at Büyükçekmece Tepecikspor until 30 June 2024)

== Transfers ==
=== In ===
Pos.	Player	Transferred from	Fee	Date	Source
DF	(Brazil) Cláudio Winck	(Portugal) Marítimo	Free	19 July 2023	
DF	(Nigeria) Kenneth Omeruo	(Spain) Leganés	Undisclosed	27 July 2023	
GK	(Turkey) Ali Emre Yanar	(Turkey) Altınordu	Free	31 July 2023	
GK	(Greece) Andreas Gianniotis	(Greece) Atromitos	Free	7 August 2023	

=== Out ===
Pos.	Player	Transferred to	Fee	Date	Source
DF	(Bosnia and Herzegovina) Daniel Graovac	(Turkey) Manisa	Free	20 July 2023	
DF	(Kosovo) Florent Hadergjonaj	(Turkey) Alanyaspor	Free	7 August 2023	

== Pre-season and friendlies ==
Win Draw Loss Fixtures

29 July 2023 Friendly	Kasımpaşa (Turkey)	0–1	(Saudi Arabia) Al-Arabi	Istanbul
18:30 UTC+3				Stadium: Kasımpaşaspor Kemerburgaz Tesisleri

2 August 2023 Friendly	Kasımpaşa (Turkey)	4–2	(Turkey) Gaziantep	Istanbul
18:30 UTC+3				Stadium: Kasımpaşaspor Kemerburgaz Tesisleri

5 August 2023 Friendly	Kasımpaşa (Turkey)	3–0	(Turkey) Ümraniyespor	Istanbul
19:00 UTC+3				Stadium: Recep Tayyip Erdoğan Stadium

== Competitions ==
=== Overall record ===
Competition	First match	Last match	Starting round	Record							
Competition	First match	Last match	Starting round	Pld	W	D	L	GF	GA	GD	Win %
Süper Lig	12 August 2023	19 May 2024	Matchday 1	14	6	3	5	25	27	−2	42.86
Turkish Cup	31 October 2023		Third round	1	1	0	0	3	0	+3	100.00
Total				15	7	3	5	28	27	+1	46.67

Last updated: 3 December 2023
Source: Soccerway

=== Süper Lig ===
==== League table ====
Pos	Team	Pld	W	D	L	GF	GA	GD	Pts	Qualification or relegation
3	Trabzonspor	38	21	4	13	69	50	+19	67	Qualification for the Europa League second qualifying round
4	Başakşehir	38	18	7	13	57	43	+14	61	Qualification for the Conference League second qualifying round
5	Kasımpaşa	38	16	8	14	62	65	−3	56 (Note: Kasımpaşa are ahead of Beşiktaş on head-to-head points: Kasımpaşa 2–1 Beşiktaş, Beşiktaş 1–3 Kasımpaşa.)	
6	Beşiktaş	38	16	8	14	52	47	+5	56	Qualification for the Europa League play-off round (Note: The 2023–24 Turkish Cup winners (Beşiktaş) qualify for the Europa League play-off round.)
7	Sivasspor	38	14	12	12	47	54	−7	54	

Source: Süper Lig
Rules for classification: 1) Points; 2) Head-to-head points; 3) Head-to-head goal difference; 4) Head-to-head goals scored; 5) Goal difference; 6) Goals scored; 7) Play-off.

==== Results summary ====
Overall								Home						Away					
Pld	W	D	L	GF	GA	GD	Pts	W	D	L	GF	GA	GD	W	D	L	GF	GA	GD
6	2	3	1	10	12	−2	9	2	1	1	7	9	−2	0	2	0	3	3	0

Last updated: 24 September 2023.
Source: Trendyol Süper Lig

==== Results by round ====
Round	1	2	3	4	5	6
Ground	H	A	H	H	A	H
Result	W	D	D	L	D	W
Position	3	6	6	12	11	

Updated to match(es) played on 24 September 2023. Source: Trendyol Süper Lig
A = Away; H = Home; W = Win; D = Draw; L = Loss

==== Matches ====
The league fixtures were unveiled on 19 July 2023.

12 August 2023 1	Kasımpaşa	3–2	Ankaragücü	Istanbul
19:15 TRT (UTC+3)	Kara 30'; Fall 69'; Ben Ouanes 90+3', (yellow card) 90+4'	Report	Bekiroğlu 73'; Cephas 78'	Stadium: Recep Tayyip Erdoğan Stadium; Referee: Bahattin Şimşek

19 August 2023 2	Hatayspor	0–0	Kasımpaşa	Mersin
21:45 TRT (UTC+3)		Report		Stadium: Mersin Stadium; Referee: Mert Güzenge

26 August 2023 3	Kasımpaşa	1–1	Pendikspor	Istanbul
19:15 TRT (UTC+3)		Report		Stadium: Recep Tayyip Erdoğan Stadium; Referee: Yaşar Kemal Uğurlu

1 September 2023 4	Kasımpaşa	1–5	Trabzonspor	Istanbul
21:00 TRT (UTC+3)		Report		Stadium: Recep Tayyip Erdoğan Stadium; Referee: Erkan Özdamar

17 September 2023 5	Alanyaspor	3–3	Kasımpaşa	Alanya
20:00 TRT (UTC+3)	Sergio Córdova 18'; João Novais 24', 51'	Report	Fall 45+2'; Kara 79'; Ben Ouanes 87'	Stadium: Alanya Stadium; Referee: Turgut Doman

24 September 2023 6	Kasımpaşa	2–1	Adana Demirspor	Istanbul
20:00 TRT (UTC+3)	Kara 25', 51' (pen.), (yellow card) 27'; Omeruo (yellow card) 54'; Çiftpınar (yellow card) 90+3'; Ben Ouanes (yellow card) 90+4'	Report	Özbir (red card) 19'; Stambouli (yellow card) 40' (yellow-red card) 45+8'; Erdoğan 80' (pen.); Akbaba (yellow card) 90+5'; Kévin Rodrigues (red card) 90+7'	Stadium: Recep Tayyip Erdoğan Stadium; Referee: Yasin Kol

1 October 2023	Fatih Karagümrük	2–3	Kasımpaşa	Istanbul

8 October 2023	Kasımpaşa	0–2	Fenerbahçe	Istanbul
				Stadium: Recep Tayyip Erdoğan Stadium

27 October 2023	Kasımpaşa	3–1	İstanbulspor	Istanbul
				Stadium: Recep Tayyip Erdoğan Stadium

11 November 2023	Kasımpaşa	3–4	Kayserispor	Istanbul
				Stadium: Recep Tayyip Erdoğan Stadium

3 December 2023	Kasımpaşa	4–2	Gaziantep	Istanbul
				Stadium: Recep Tayyip Erdoğan Stadium

25 December 2023	Kasımpaşa	2–2	Çaykur Rizespor	Istanbul
				Stadium: Recep Tayyip Erdoğan Stadium

9 January 2024	Kasımpaşa	0–3	Başakşehir	Istanbul
				Stadium: Recep Tayyip Erdoğan Stadium

20 January 2024	Kasımpaşa	3–0	Hatayspor	Istanbul
				Stadium: Recep Tayyip Erdoğan Stadium

4 February 2024 24	Kasımpaşa	2–1	Alanyaspor	Istanbul
16:00 TRT (UTC+3)	Gül 36'; Fall 59'		Porozo 28' (o.g.); Richard (yellow card) 53'; Bayır (yellow card) 90+4'; Fer (yellow card) 90+4'; Balkovec (yellow card) 90+5'	Stadium: Recep Tayyip Erdoğan Stadium; Referee: Oğuzhan Çakır

9 February 2024 25	Adana Demirspor	1–3	Kasımpaşa	Adana
20:00 TRT (UTC+3)	Gravillon (yellow card) 38'; Mohammadi (yellow card) 63'; Güler (yellow card) 67'; Balotelli 87', (yellow card) 88'; Nani (yellow card) 88'		Fall 29'; Kara 32'; Hajradinović 57' (pen.); Winck (yellow card) 67'; Yanar (yellow card) 72'; Ben Ouanes (yellow card) 86'	Stadium: New Adana Stadium; Referee: Burak Pakkan

16 February 2024 26	Kasımpaşa	1–1	Fatih Karagümrük	Istanbul
20:00 TRT (UTC+3)	Da Costa 11', (yellow card) 71'; Porozo (yellow card) 69'		Eysseric 38'; Mor (yellow card) 78'; Mendes (yellow card) 84'	Stadium: Recep Tayyip Erdoğan Stadium; Referee: Kadir Sağlam

24 February 2024 27	Fenerbahçe	v	Kasımpaşa	Istanbul
19:00 TRT (UTC+3)				Stadium: Şükrü Saracoğlu Stadium

=== Turkish Cup ===
31 October 2023 Third round	Kasımpaşa	3–0	68 Aksaray Belediye Spor	Istanbul
12:00				Stadium: Recep Tayyip Erdoğan Stadium

6 December 2023 Fourth round	Kasımpaşa	v	Kırşehirspor	Istanbul
13:00				Stadium: Recep Tayyip Erdoğan Stadium
