= 2019–20 Kasımpaşa S.K. season =

Kasımpaşa Spor Kulübü
2019–20 season
- Chairman: Turgay Ciner
- Manager: Fuat Çapa
- Stadium: Recep Tayyip Erdoğan Stadium
- Süper Lig: 10th
- Turkish Cup: Round of 16
- Top goalscorer: Bengali-Fodé Koita (12)
Home colours	Away colours	Third colours

The 2019–20 season was Kasımpaşa Spor Kulübü's 99th year in existence. In addition to the domestic league, Kasımpaşa Spor Kulübü participated in the Turkish Cup.

== Squad ==
As of 25 January 2020

Note: Flags indicate national team as defined under FIFA eligibility rules; some limited exceptions apply. Players may hold more than one non-FIFA nationality.

No.	Pos.	Nation	Player
1	GK	TUR	Ramazan Köse
2	DF	TUR	Berk Çetin
3	DF	NED	Dogucan Haspolat
6	MF	KOS	Loret Sadiku
7	MF	TUR	Yusuf Erdoğan
8	MF	CZE	David Pavelka
9	FW	GUI	Bengali-Fodé Koita
10	MF	BIH	Haris Hajradinović
11	FW	SEN	Mame Thiam
13	GK	TUR	Murat Can Yıldız
14	MF	NOR	Tobias Heintz
15	MF	TUR	Tarkan Serbest
17	FW	POR	Ricardo Quaresma
24	DF	BEL	Mickaël Tirpan
25	DF	CZE	Tomáš Břečka
26	MF	TUR	İlhan Depe

No.	Pos.	Nation	Player
30	FW	CIV	Gerard Gohou
31	DF	FRA	Olivier Veigneau
35	MF	TUR	Aytaç Kara
44	DF	POR	Jorge Fernandes (on loan from Porto)
45	DF	TUR	Çağtay Kurukalıp
50	DF	CRO	Zvonimir Šarlija
53	FW	TUR	Ahmet Demirli
57	DF	TUR	Furkan Cetinkaya
67	GK	TUR	Mehmet Enes Sarı
70	MF	COD	Dieumerci Ndongala (on loan from Genk)
71	MF	TUR	Anıl Koç
77	MF	TUR	Azad Toptik
80	DF	TUN	Yassine Meriah (on loan from Olympiacos)
92	DF	TUN	Oussama Haddadi (on loan from Al-Ettifaq)
94	DF	KOS	Florent Hadergjonaj (on loan from Huddersfield)
99	GK	FRA	Fatih Öztürk

== Süper Lig ==
=== League table ===
Pos	Team	Pld	W	D	L	GF	GA	GD	Pts
8	Gaziantep	34	11	13	10	49	50	−1	46
9	Antalyaspor	34	11	12	11	41	52	−11	45
10	Kasımpaşa	34	12	7	15	53	58	−5	43
11	Göztepe	34	11	9	14	44	49	−5	42
12	Gençlerbirliği	34	9	9	16	39	56	−17	36 (Note: Head-to-head points: Gençlerbirliği 4, Konyaspor 1)

Source: Süper Lig, Soccerway
Rules for classification: 1) Points; 2) Head-to-head points; 3) Head-to-head goal difference; 4) Head-to-head goals scored; 5) Goal difference; 6) Goals scored; 7) Play-off.

=== Results summary ===
Overall								Home						Away					
Pld	W	D	L	GF	GA	GD	Pts	W	D	L	GF	GA	GD	W	D	L	GF	GA	GD
32	11	6	15	48	54	−6	39	6	3	7	27	23	+4	5	3	8	21	31	−10

Source: TFF

== Matches ==
August 18, 2019 1	Kasımpaşa	1–1	Trabzonspor	Kasımpaşa, Beyoğlu, Istanbul
21.45	Haris Hajradinović (yellow card) 3'; Aytaç Kara 40'; Jorge Fernandes (yellow card) 90'	Report	34' Alexander Sørloth	Stadium: Recep Tayyip Erdoğan Stadium; Referee: Cüneyt Çakır; Assistant referees: Bahattin Duran, Tarık Ongun; Fourth official: Volkan Bayarslan; Fifth official: Mete Kalkavan, Mustafa Emre Eyisoy

August 24, 2019 2	Alanyaspor	2–1	Kasımpaşa	Alanya, Antalya
21.45	Júnior Fernándes 9'; Efecan Karaca (yellow card) 61'; Yacine Bammou 88'	Report	(yellow card) 31' (goal) 33' Mame Baba Thiam; (yellow card) 45' Abdul Khalili; (yellow card) 78' Karim Hafez; (yellow card) 89' Mustafa Pektemek	Stadium: Bahçeşehir Okulları Stadium; Referee: Serkan Tokat

August 30, 2019 3	Kasımpaşa	0–0	MKE Ankaragücü	Kasımpaşa, Beyoğlu, Istanbul
20.30	Karim Hafez (yellow card) 41'	Report	(yellow card) 45' İlhan Parlak; (yellow card) 39' Aydın Karabulut; (yellow card) 76' Tiago Pinto; (yellow card) 83' Ricardo Faty; (yellow card) 90' Zaur Sadayev	Stadium: Recep Tayyip Erdoğan Stadium; Referee: Zorbay Küçük

September 13, 2019 4	Galatasaray	1–0	Kasımpaşa	Istanbul
20.30	Marcão (yellow card) 35'; Radamel Falcao 38'; Ömer Bayram (yellow card) 87'	Report	(yellow card) 26' Haris Hajradinović; (yellow card) 72' Syam Ben Youssef; (yellow card) 78' Ricardo Quaresma	Stadium: Türk Telekom Stadium; Referee: Ali Palabıyık; Assistant referees: Serkan Olguncan, Serkan Çimen; Fourth official: Erkan Özdamar; Fifth official: Serkan Tokat, Bahattin Duran

September 21, 2019 5	Kasımpaşa	3–0	Antalyaspor	Istanbul
15.00	Mustafa Pektemek 53'; Mame Baba Thiam 60', 80' (yellow card) 71'; Aytaç Kara (yellow card) 90'	Report	(yellow card) 55' Bahadır Öztürk; (yellow card) 64' Nazım Sangaré; (yellow card) 87' Charles Fernando Basílio da Silva	Stadium: Recep Tayyip Erdoğan Stadium; Attendance: 2.170; Referee: Koray Gençerler; Assistant referees: Samet Çavuş, Özgür Ertem; Fourth official: Hakan Ülker; Fifth official: Ümit Öztürk, Mustafa Emre Eyisoy

September 28, 2019 6	Denizlispor	0–1	Kasımpaşa	Denizli
15.00		Report	67' Haris Hajradinović; (yellow card) 79' Abdul Khalili; (yellow card) 90' Fatih Öztürk	Stadium: Atatürk Stadyumu; Attendance: 8.090; Referee: Tugay Kağan Numanoğlu; Assistant referees: Mehmet Salih Mazlum, Deniz Caner Özaral; Fourth official: Hüseyin Gökberk Arslan; Fifth official: Arda Kardeşler, Ceyhun Sesigüzel

October 5, 2019 7	Kasımpaşa	1–1	Konyaspor	Istanbul
15.00	Karim Hafez (yellow card) 29'; Veysel Sarı 45+2' (yellow card) 59'; Fatih Öztürk (yellow card) 62'; Jorge Filipe Oliveira Fernandes (yellow card) 68'; Ricardo Quaresma (yellow card) 89'	Report	44' (pen.) Marko Jevtović; (yellow card) 51' Deni Milošević; (yellow card) 85' Alper Uludağ	Stadium: Recep Tayyip Erdoğan Stadium; Attendance: 2.503; Referee: Serkan Tokat

October 20, 2019 8	Kayserispor	1–1	Kasımpaşa	Kayseri
14.00	Bernard Mensah (yellow card) 23'; Hasan Hüseyin Acar (yellow card) 46'; Pedro Henrique Konzen (yellow card) 54' (goal) 56'; Miguel Lopes (yellow card) 74'; Umut Bulut (yellow card) 84'	Report	6' Mame Baba Thiam; (yellow card) 80' Loret Sadiku; (yellow card) 90+1' Veysel Sarı; (yellow card) 90+3' Aytaç Kara	Stadium: Kadir Has Şehir Stadyumu; Attendance: 7.941; Referee: Atilla Karaoğlan; Assistant referees: Mehmet Metin, Kamil Çetin; Fourth official: Hasan Avcı; Fifth official: Sarper Barış Saka, Kutluhan Bilgiç

October 27, 2019 9	Göztepe	1–3	Kasımpaşa	İzmir
16.30	Alpaslan Öztürk (yellow card) 16'; Beto (yellow card) 50'; Halil Akbunar (yellow card) 62'; Berkan Emir 45' (yellow card) 66'	Report	27' Haris Hajradinović; 51' (pen.) Ricardo Quaresma; 76' Mustafa Pektemek	Stadium: Bornova Stadium; Attendance: 7.894; Referee: Ümit Öztürk

November 3, 2019 10	Kasımpaşa	2–2	Yeni Malatyaspor	Istanbul
16.30	Bengali-Fodé Koita 13'; Ricardo Quaresma (yellow card) 33'; Veysel Sarı 67'; Syam Ben Youssef (yellow card) 75'	Report	62', 90+5' Adis Jahović; (yellow card) 17' (yellow card) 77' (red card) Robin Yalçın; (yellow card) 90+5' Sakıb Aytaç	Stadium: Recep Tayyip Erdoğan Stadium; Attendance: 4.012; Referee: Halis Özkahya

November 8, 2019 11	Fenerbahçe	3–2	Kasımpaşa	Istanbul
20.30	Victor Moses (yellow card) 3'; Vedat Muriqi 6' (pen.) 44' (pen.); Serdar Aziz (yellow card) 43' (goal) 59'; Vedat Muriqi (yellow card) 69'; Mauricio Isla (red card) 72'	Report	37' Abdul Khalili; (yellow card) 44' Loret Sadiku; (yellow card) 45' (yellow card) 45' (red card) Karim Hafez; (yellow card) 45' Aytaç Kara; 56' Syam Ben Youssef; (yellow card) 80' Jorge Fernandes	Stadium: Şükrü Saracoğlu Stadyumu; Attendance: 37.745; Referee: Ali Palabıyık; Assistant referees: Serkan Olguncan, Serkan Çimen; Fourth official: Kutluhan Bilgiç; Fifth official: Serka Tokat, İbrahim Çağlar Uyarcan

November 24, 2019 12	Kasımpaşa	3–2	Gençlerbirliği	Istanbul
16.30	Aytaç Kara 54', 57', 73' (pen.); Strahil Popov (yellow card) 87'	Report	(yellow card) 69' (goal) 82' 88' (pen.) Bogdan Stancu	Stadium: Recep Tayyip Erdoğan Stadium; Attendance: 1.919; Referee: Alper Ulusoy

November 30, 2019 13	Sivasspor	2–0	Kasımpaşa	Sivas
15.00	Hakan Arslan 9'; Mustapha Yatabaré 17' (yellow card) 87'	Report	(yellow card) 10' Aytaç Kara; (yellow card) 19' Jorge Fernandes; (yellow card) 36' Bengali-Fodé Koita	Stadium: New Sivas 4 Eylül Stadium; Attendance: 9.956; Referee: Cüneyt Çakır; Assistant referees: Tarık Ongun, Alpaslan Dedeş; Fourth official: Mustafa Kürşad Filiz; Fifth official: Özgüç Türkalp, Çağdaş Altay

December 8, 2019 14	Kasımpaşa	2–2	Beşiktaş	Istanbul
19.00	Karim Hafez (red card) 15'; Mustafa Pektemek 24'; Bengali-Fodé Koita (yellow card) 32' (goal) 56'; İlhan Depe (yellow card) 77'	Report	(yellow card) 33' Atiba Hutchinson; 39' Caner Erkin; (yellow card) 45+3' Burak Yılmaz; (yellow card) 57' Mohamed Elneny; (yellow card) 67' Enzo Roco; (yellow card) 90' Gökhan Gönül	Stadium: Recep Tayyip Erdoğan Stadium; Attendance: 5.324; Referee: Arda Kardeşler

December 14, 2019 15	Çaykur Rizespor	0–0	Kasımpaşa	Rize
15.00	Fernando Boldrin (penalty missed) 49'; Ismaël Diomandé (yellow card) 62' (yellow card) 79' (red card); Amedej Vetrih (yellow card) 62'; Orhan Ovacıklı (yellow card) 88'; Mohamed Abarhoun (yellow card) 90+3'	Report		Stadium: Yeni Rize Şehir Stadium; Attendance: 5.101; Referee: Ümit Öztürk

December 21, 2019 16	Kasımpaşa	3–0	Gaziantep	Istanbul
17.30	Veysel Sarı 10'; Fatih Öztürk (yellow card) 10'; Aytaç Kara (yellow card) 51'; Ricardo Quaresma 57' (penalty missed) 75'; Abdul Khalili (yellow card) 65'; Mame Baba Thiam 80'; İlhan Depe (yellow card) 88'	Report		Stadium: Recep Tayyip Erdoğan Stadium; Attendance: 1.993; Referee: Abdulkadir Bitigen

December 28, 2019 17	İstanbul Başakşehir	3–1	Kasımpaşa	Istanbul
17.30	Enzo Crivelli 5' (yellow card) 24'; Jorge Fernandes 24' (o.g.); Eljero Elia 62'	Report	(yellow card) 11' Mame Baba Thiam; (yellow card) 34' Olivier Veigneau; 65' (pen.) Ricardo Quaresma; (yellow card) 86' Haris Hajradinović	Stadium: Başakşehir Fatih Terim Stadium; Attendance: 1.454; Referee: Atilla Karaoğlan

January 19, 2020 18	Trabzonspor	0–0	Kasımpaşa	Trabzon
16.00		Report	(yellow card) 24' (yellow card) 46' (red card) Jorge Fernandes; (yellow card) 35' Aytaç Kara; (yellow card) 63' Zvonimir Šarlija	Stadium: Şenol Güneş Stadium; Attendance: 24.849; Referee: Zorbay Küçük

January 25, 2020 19	Kasımpaşa	0–1	Alanyaspor	Istanbul
17.00	Tarkan Serbest (yellow card) 54'; Oussama Haddadi (yellow card) 76'; Haris Hajradinović (red card) 90+3'	Report	34' Papiss Cissé; (yellow card) 45' Baiano	Stadium: Recep Tayyip Erdoğan Stadium; Attendance: 1.442; Referee: Özgür Yankaya

February 2, 2020 20	MKE Ankaragücü	1–1	Kasımpaşa	Ankara
13.30	Gerson Rodrigues 50' (pen.); Ricardo Faty (yellow card) 77'; Dever Orgill (yellow card) 83'; Ante Kulušić (yellow card) 90+3'	Report	7' Mame Baba Thiam; (yellow card) 22' Tarkan Serbest; (yellow card) 45+1' Dieumerci Ndongala; (yellow card) 83' Ricardo Quaresma	Stadium: Eryaman Stadium; Attendance: 13.600; Referee: Halil Umut Meler; Assistant referees: Bahattin Duran, İlker Takpak; Fourth official: Hakan Ülker; Fifth official: Ali Şansalan, Emre Kargın

February 9, 2020 21	Kasımpaşa	0–1	Galatasaray	Istanbul
19.00	Florent Hadergjonaj (yellow card) 20'; Tomáš Břečka (yellow card) 60'	Report	43' Adem Büyük	Stadium: Recep Tayyip Erdoğan Stadium; Attendance: 4.949; Referee: Mete Kalkavan

February 17, 2020 22	Antalyaspor	0–1	Kasımpaşa	Antalya
20.00	Ondřej Čelůstka (yellow card) 73'; Doğukan Sinik (yellow card) 89'	Report	(yellow card) 11' Mame Baba Thiam; (yellow card) 30' Mickaël Tirpan; (yellow card) 51' Dieumerci Ndongala; 74' Aytaç Kara	Stadium: New Antalya Stadium; Attendance: 10.860; Referee: Arda Kardeşler

February 24, 2020 23	Kasımpaşa	2–0	Denizlispor	Istanbul
20.00	Tomáš Břečka 22'; Yassine Meriah (yellow card) 26'; Mickaël Tirpan (yellow card) 36'; Haris Hajradinović 83'	Report	(yellow card) 75' Isaac Sackey	Stadium: Recep Tayyip Erdoğan Stadium; Attendance: 1.625; Referee: Atilla Karaoğlan; Assistant referees: Mehmet Cem Hanoğlu, İbrahim Bozbey; Fourth official: Muhammet Ali Metoğlu; Fifth official: Mete Kalkavan, Esat Sancaktar

February 29, 2020 24	Konyaspor	0–0	Kasımpaşa	Konya
14.00	Paolo Hurtado (yellow card) 90'	Report		Stadium: Büyükşehir Belediye Stadyumu; Attendance: 8.624; Referee: Ali Palabıyık; Assistant referees: Serkan Olguncan, Mustafa Sönmez; Fourth official: Burak Olcar; Fifth official: Fırat Aydınus, Oğuzhan Uğurlu

March 8, 2020 25	Kasımpaşa	5–1	Kayserispor	Istanbul
13.30	Bengali-Fodé Koita 6'; Zvonimir Šarlija 11'; Dieumerci Ndongala 30'; Aytaç Kara (yellow card) 40' (goal) 83'; Mickaël Tirpan (yellow card) 62'; Yusuf Erdoğan 87'; Yassine Meriah (yellow card) 90+1'	Report	59' (yellow card) 90' Bernard Mensah; (yellow card) 70' Gustavo Campanharo; (yellow card) 90+1' Cristian Săpunaru; (yellow card) 90+3' Aksel Aktas	Stadium: Recep Tayyip Erdoğan Stadium; Attendance: 2.564; Referee: Hüseyin Göçek; Assistant referees: Mehmet Salih Mazlum, Deniz Caner Özaral; Fourth official: Burak Taşkınsoy; Fifth official: Ümit Öztürk, Mustafa Kürşad Filiz

March 13, 2020 26	Kasımpaşa	2–0	Göztepe	Istanbul
20.00	Bengali-Fodé Koita 2', 90+3'; Zvonimir Šarlija (yellow card) 59'; Oussama Haddadi (yellow card) 71'; Aytaç Kara (yellow card) 73'	Report	(yellow card) 72' Berkan Emir; (yellow card) 86' Cameron Jerome	Stadium: Recep Tayyip Erdoğan Stadium; Attendance: 0 Referee: Halil Umut Meler; Assistant referees: Mustafa Emre Eyisoy, Kerem Ersoy; Fourth official: Direnç Tonusluoğlu; Fifth official: Ümit Öztürk, Çağdaş Altay

June 13, 2020 27	Yeni Malatyaspor	1–0	Kasımpaşa	Malatya
21.00	Mitchell Donald 45+3'; Issam Chebake (yellow card) 90+3'	Report		Stadium: Malatya Arena; Attendance: 0 Referee: Halil Umut Meler

June 21, 2020 28	Kasımpaşa	2–0	Fenerbahçe	Istanbul
18.30	Yassine Meriah (yellow card) 13'; Mickaël Tirpan (yellow card) 24'; Mame Baba Thiam 55'; David Pavelka (yellow card) 73'; Gerard Gohou (yellow card) 84'; Yusuf Erdoğan 90+3'	Report		Stadium: Recep Tayyip Erdoğan Stadium; Attendance: 0 Referee: Fırat Aydınus; Assistant referees: Aleks Taşcıoğlu, Erdem Bayık; Fourth official: Onur Özütoprak; Fifth official: Yaşar Kemal Uğurlu, Mustafa Kürşad Filiz

June 29, 2020 29	Gençlerbirliği	0–2	Kasımpaşa	Ankara
21.00	Yasin Pehlivan (yellow card) 89'; Flávio Ramos (yellow card) 90'	Report	17' Bengali-Fodé Koita; (yellow card) 27' Jorge Fernandes; 90+5' Dieumerci Ndongala	Stadium: Eryaman Stadium; Attendance: 0 Referee: Halis Özkahya; Assistant referees: Ekrem Kan, Hakan Yemişken; Fourth official: Yiğit Arslan; Fifth official: Özgür Yankaya, Oğuzhan Uğurlu

July 5, 2020 30	Kasımpaşa	0–0	Sivasspor	Istanbul
18.30	Florent Hadergjonaj (yellow card) 56' (yellow card) 62' (red card); David Pavelka (yellow card) 79'	Report	(yellow card) 24' Marcelo Goiano	Stadium: Recep Tayyip Erdoğan Stadium; Attendance: 0 Referee: Atilla Karaoğlan; Assistant referees: Osman Gökhan Bilir, İlker Takpak; Fourth official: Yasin Kol; Fifth official: Hüseyin Göçek, Yakup Özhan

July 9, 2020 31	Beşiktaş	2–3	Kasımpaşa	Istanbul
21.00	Tyler Boyd (soccer) 6'; Gökhan Gönül (yellow card) 33'; Atiba Hutchinson (yellow card) 63'; Necip Uysal (yellow card) 81'; Güven Yalçın 90+1'	Report	21', 29', 33' (yellow card) 40' Bengali-Fodé Koita	Stadium: Vodafone Park; Attendance: 0 Referee: Ali Şansalan

July 13, 2020 32	Kasımpaşa	2–0	Çaykur Rizespor	Istanbul
18.30	Aytaç Kara (yellow card) 48'; Haris Hajradinović 53'; Anıl Koç 78'; Mame Baba Thiam (penalty missed) 90'	Report	(yellow card) 10' Burak Albayrak; (yellow card) 61' Ismaël Diomandé	Stadium: Recep Tayyip Erdoğan Stadium; Attendance: 0 Referee: Arda Kardeşler; Assistant referees: Alpaslan Ddedeş, İsmail Şencan; Fourth official: Murat Erdoğan; Fifth official: Serkan Tokat, Özgüç Türkalp

July 18, 2020 33	Gaziantep	0–0	Kasımpaşa	Gaziantep
21.00		Report	(yellow card) 1' David Pavelka	Stadium: New Gaziantep Stadium; Attendance: 0 Referee: Volkan Bayarslan

July 23, 2020 34	Kasımpaşa	1–0	İstanbul Başakşehir	Istanbul
21.00	Bengali-Fodé Koita 73'; Strahil Popov (yellow card) 89'	Report		Stadium: Recep Tayyip Erdoğan Stadium; Attendance: 0 Referee: Ali Mehmet

=== Turkish Cup ===
4 December 2019 Fifth round first leg	Kasımpaşa	2–1	Van Spor	Istanbul
14:30	Heintz 31'; Kara 44'		Er 18'	Stadium: Recep Tayyip Erdoğan

17 December 2019 Fifth round second leg	Van Spor	2–2 (a.e.t.)	Kasımpaşa	Van
13:00	Er 45' (pen.); Cansu 60'		Hajradinovic 34'; Depe 97'	Stadium: Van Atatürk

==== Round of 16 ====
Team 1	Agg.	Team 2	1st leg	2nd leg
Alanyaspor	5–4	Kasımpaşa	3–1	2–3
