= Sadık Çiftpınar =

Turkish footballer

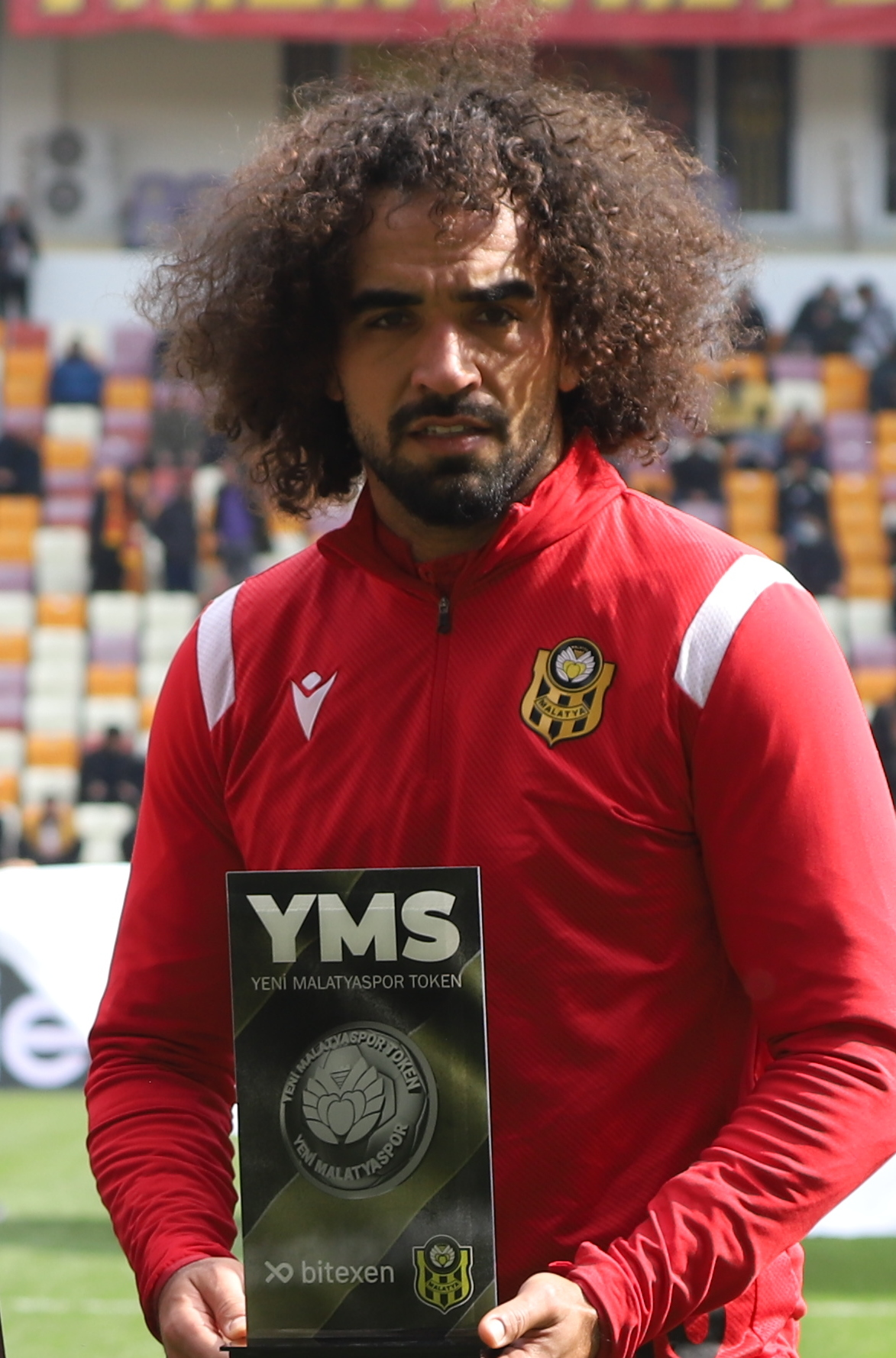
- Çiftpınar in 2022

Personal information
- Full name: Sadık Çiftpınar
- Date of birth: 1 January 1993 (age 33)
- Place of birth: Seyhan, Turkey
- Height: 1.83 m (6 ft 0 in)
- Position: Defender

Team information
- Current team: Serikspor
- Number: 18

Youth career
- 2003–2009: Seyhan Belediyespor
- 2009–2013: Galatasaray

Senior career*
Years	Team	Apps	(Gls)
2013–2015	Trabzon Akçaabat	45	(4)
2015–2019	Yeni Malatyaspor	109	(2)
2019–2021	Fenerbahçe	19	(1)
2021–2022	Yeni Malatyaspor	24	(0)
2022–2025	Kasımpaşa	50	(1)
2025–2026	Sakaryaspor	12	(0)
2026	Şanlıurfaspor	10	(0)
2026–	Serikspor	9	(0)

International career^{‡}
2009–2010	Turkey U17	4	(1)
2010–2011	Turkey U18	6	(0)
2011	Turkey U19	3	(0)
2012–2013	Turkey U20	8	(1)
- * Club domestic league appearances and goals as of 14 November 2026 ‡ National team caps and goals as of 18 October 2017

Sadık Çiftpınar (born 1 January 1993) is a Turkish footballer who plays as a defender for TFF 2. Lig club Serikspor.

== Professional career ==
Çiftpinar joined Yeni Malatyaspor in January 2015 and helped them through two successful promotions from the TFF Second League into the Süper Lig. Çiftpinar made his professional debut for Yeni Malatyaspor in a 4–2 Süper Lig win over Kardemir Karabükspor on 24 September 2017.

He joined Fenerbahçe signing a 3.5 year contract, with an option of an extra season, on 5 January 2019.

On 18 August 2021, Çiftpınar returned to Yeni Malatyaspor, after parting ways with Fenerbahçe.

In the summer of 2022, Çiftpınar signed with Kasımpaşa.

=== Controversy ===
In Yeni Malatyaspor's match with Kasımpaşa, Çiftpınar wanted to leave the game after being booed for signalling his genitalia to the crowd following his mistake in his club's second goal conceded. After the event, he was left out of the squad for an indefinite amount of time.

== Career statistics ==
=== Club ===
As of 17 November 2023

Appearances and goals by club, season and competition
Club	Season	League			National Cup		Continental		Total	
Club	Season	Division	Apps	Goals	Apps	Goals	Apps	Goals	Apps	Goals
Trabzon Akçaabat	TFF Third League	2013–14	30	2	0	0	—		30	2
Trabzon Akçaabat	TFF Third League	2014–15	15	2	2	0	—		17	2
Trabzon Akçaabat	Total		45	4	2	0	0	0	47	4
Yeni Malatyaspor	TFF Second League	2014–15	7	0	0	0	—		7	0
Yeni Malatyaspor	TFF First League	2015–16	32	2	1	0	—		33	2
Yeni Malatyaspor	TFF First League	2016–17	26	0	1	0	—		27	0
Yeni Malatyaspor	Süper Lig	2017–18	28	0	1	0	—		29	0
Yeni Malatyaspor	Süper Lig	2018–19	16	0	1	0	—		17	0
Yeni Malatyaspor	Total		109	2	4	0	0	0	113	2
Fenerbahçe	Süper Lig	2018–19	9	1	2	0	2 (Note: Appearances in UEFA Europa League)	0	13	1
Fenerbahçe	Süper Lig	2019–20	4	0	2	1	0	0	6	1
Fenerbahçe	Süper Lig	2020–21	6	0	2	0	0	0	8	0
Fenerbahçe	Süper Lig	2021–22	0	0	0	0	0	0	0	0
Fenerbahçe	Total		19	1	6	1	2	0	27	2
Yeni Malatyaspor	Süper Lig	2021–22	24	0	1	0	—		25	0
Kasimpaşa	Süper Lig	2022–23	12	1	0	0	—		12	1
Kasimpaşa	Süper Lig	2023–24	21	0	0	0	—		21	0
Kasimpaşa	Total		33	1	0	0	0	0	33	1
Career total			230	8	13	1	2	0	245	9
