= Aytaç Kara =

Turkish footballer (born 1993)

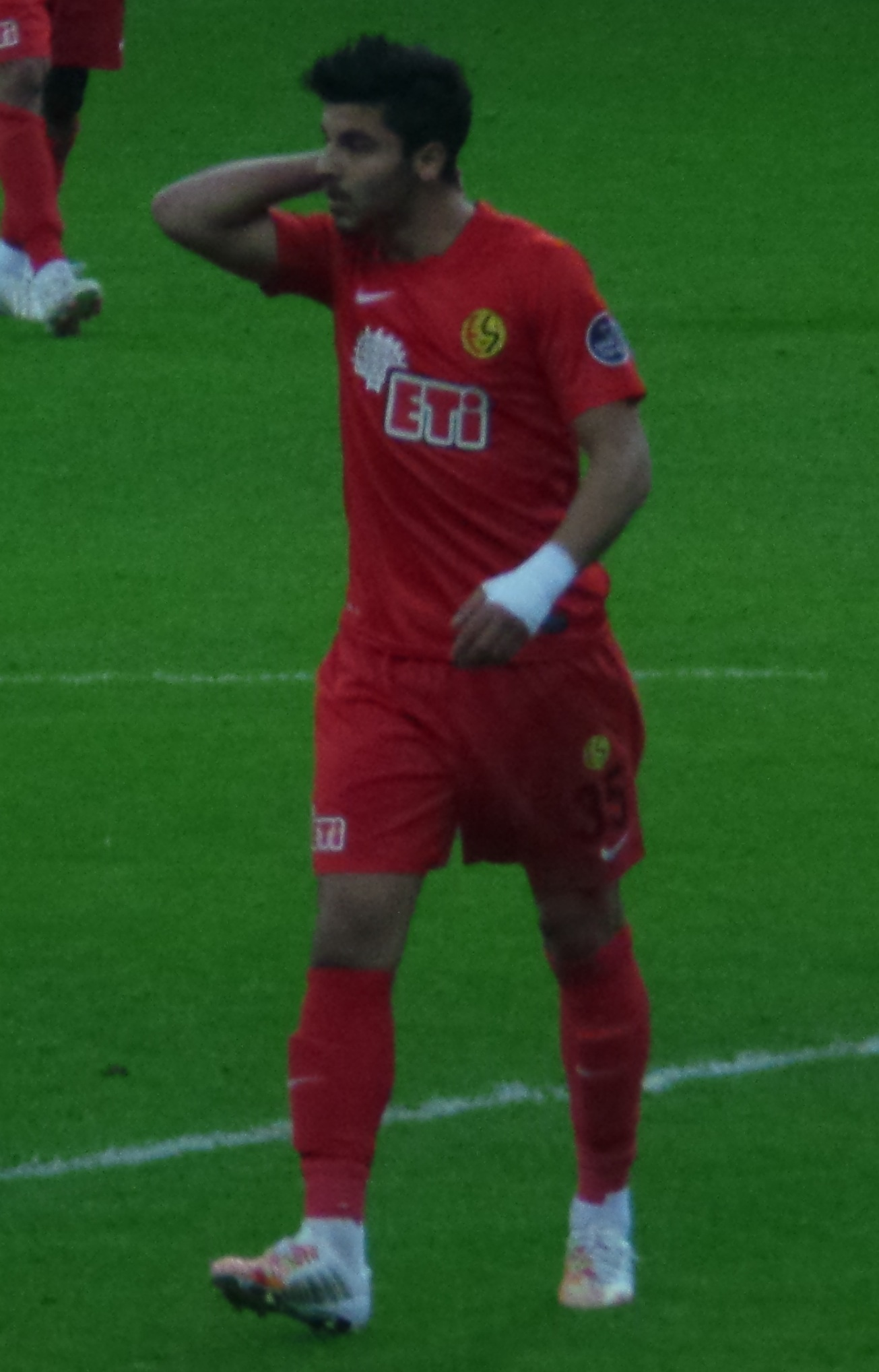

Personal information
- Date of birth: 23 March 1993 (age 33)
- Place of birth: Bornova, Turkey
- Height: 1.88 m (6 ft 2 in)
- Position: Defensive midfielder

Team information
- Current team: İstanbulspor
- Number: 34

Youth career
- 2003–2010: Altay

Senior career*
Years	Team	Apps	(Gls)
2010–2012	Altay	23	(0)
2012–2015	Eskişehirspor	43	(4)
2015–2018	Trabzonspor	54	(2)
2017–2018	→ Yeni Malatyaspor (loan)	31	(4)
2018–2019	Bursaspor	32	(6)
2019–2021	Kasımpaşa	58	(9)
2021–2022	Galatasaray	6	(0)
2022	→ Göztepe (loan)	7	(0)
2022–2025	Kasımpaşa	98	(24)
2025–2026	Amed	15	(1)
2026	Sarıyer	10	(2)
2026–	İstanbulspor	2	(0)

International career^{‡}
2010–2011	Turkey U18	7	(0)
2011	Turkey U19	2	(0)
2012	Turkey U20	2	(0)
2013–2014	Turkey U21	4	(0)
2013–	Turkey	2	(0)
- * Club domestic league appearances and goals as of 14 October 2026 ‡ National team caps and goals as of 17 November 2019

Aytaç Kara (born 23 March 1993) is a Turkish professional footballer who plays as a defensive midfielder for TFF 1. Lig club İstanbulspor.

== Club career ==
Kara made his Süper Lig debut on 31 August 2012.

=== Galatasaray ===
He signed a three-year contract with Galatasaray in the 2021-22 season.

On 2 August 2022, his contract was terminated on mutual agreement.

=== Göztepe ===
On 4 February 2022, he was loaned to Göztepe until the end of the season.

== Career statistics ==
=== Club ===
As of match played 23 August 2024

Appearances and goals by club, season and competition
Club	Season	League			National Cup (Note: Includes Turkish Cup)		Europe		Other		Total	
Club	Season	Division	Apps	Goals	Apps	Goals	Apps	Goals	Apps	Goals	Apps	Goals
Altay	2010–11	1. Lig	1	0	1	0	—		—		2	0
Altay	2011–12	2. Lig	20	0	1	0	—		—		21	0
Altay	Total		21	0	2	0	—		—		23	0
Eskişehirspor	2012–13	Süper Lig	2	0	0	0	0	0	—		2	0
Eskişehirspor	2013–14	Süper Lig	26	3	10	1	—		—		36	4
Eskişehirspor	2014–15	Süper Lig	3	0	2	0	—		—		5	0
Eskişehirspor	Total		31	3	12	1	0	0	—		43	4
Trabzonspor	2014–15	Süper Lig	4	0	1	0	—		—		5	0
Trabzonspor	2015–16	Süper Lig	18	1	6	1	2 (Note: Appearance(s) in UEFA Europa League)	0	—		26	2
Trabzonspor	2016–17	Süper Lig	17	0	6	0	—		—		23	0
Trabzonspor	Total		39	1	13	1	2	0	—		54	2
Yeni Malatyaspor (loan)	2017–18	Süper Lig	29	4	2	0	—		—		31	4
Bursaspor	2018–19	Süper Lig	32	6	0	0	—		—		32	6
Kasımpaşa	2019–20	Süper Lig	32	5	3	3	—		—		35	8
Kasımpaşa	2020–21	Süper Lig	26	4	3	0	—		—		29	4
Kasımpaşa	Total		58	9	6	3	—		—		64	12
Galatasaray	2021–22	Süper Lig	6	0	0	0	6 (Note: Two appearances in UEFA Champions League, four appearances in UEFA Europa League)	0	—		12	0
Göztepe (loan)	2021–22	Süper Lig	7	0	1	0	—		—		8	0
Kasımpaşa	2022–23	Süper Lig	32	3	2	2	—		—		34	5
Kasımpaşa	2023–24	Süper Lig	37	14	1	0	—		—		38	14
Kasımpaşa	Total		69	17	3	2	—		—		72	19
Career total			292	40	39	7	8	0	—		339	47
