= Oğuzhan Efe Yılmaz =

Turkish footballer

Personal information
- Date of birth: 17 June 2003 (age 23)
- Place of birth: Yenimahalle, Turkey
- Height: 1.81 m (5 ft 11 in)
- Position: Defensive midfielder

Team information
- Current team: Beykoz Anadoluspor
- Number: 4

Youth career
- 2013–2021: Ankaraspor

Senior career*
Years	Team	Apps	(Gls)
2021–2022	Ankaraspor	24	(0)
2022–2026	Kasımpaşa	1	(0)
2023	→ Kırklarelispor (loan)	12	(1)
2023–2024	→ Ankaraspor (loan)	31	(1)
2024–2025	→ Ankara Demirspor (loan)	24	(1)
2026	→ Çayeli SK (loan)	14	(1)
2026–	Beykoz Anadoluspor	7	(0)
- * Club domestic league appearances and goals as of 18 October 2026

Oğuzhan Efe Yılmaz (born 17 June 2003) is a Turkish professional footballer who plays as a defensive midfielder for TFF 3. Lig club Beykoz Anadoluspor.

== Professional career ==
Yılmaz began his senior career with Ankaraspor in 2019. On 19 July 2022, he transferred to the Süper Lig club Kasımpaşa. He made his professional debut with Kasımpaşa on 28 August 2022 in a 1–0 Süper Lig win over Hatayspor, coming on as a substitute in the 82nd minute.

== International career ==
Yılmaz was called up to a training camp for the Turkey U19s in December 2021.
