= Azad Toptik =

German-born Turkish footballer

Personal information
- Date of birth: 12 February 1999 (age 27)
- Place of birth: Schwäbisch Hall, Germany
- Height: 1.78 m (5 ft 10 in)
- Position: Winger

Youth career
- 2010–2019: Stuttgart

Senior career*
Years	Team	Apps	(Gls)
2017–2019	Stuttgart II	11	(0)
2019–2021	Kasımpaşa	2	(0)
2021	Ankaraspor	1	(0)

International career
2014	Turkey U15	3	(0)
2017	Turkey U19	1	(0)
- * Club domestic league appearances and goals

Azad Toptik (born 12 February 1999) is a footballer who plays as a winger. Born in Germany, he has represented Turkey internationally at youth level.

== Club career ==
On 4 January 2019, Toptik moved to Kasımpaşa from VfB Stuttgart. He made his professional debut for Kasımpaşa in a 1-0 Süper Lig loss to Çaykur Rizespor on 21 January 2019.

== International career ==
Born in Germany, his father is from Diyarbakır, Turkey. Toptik is a youth international for Turkey.
