= Onur Ural =

Turkish footballer

Personal information
- Date of birth: 22 February 1997 (age 29)
- Place of birth: Istanbul, Turkey
- Height: 1.80 m (5 ft 11 in)
- Position: Right-back

Team information
- Current team: 68 Aksaray Belediyespor
- Number: 55

Youth career
- 2007–2009: Bayrampaşa Demirspor
- 2009–2011: Terazidere
- 2011–2018: Kasımpaşa

Senior career*
Years	Team	Apps	(Gls)
2018–2023	Kasımpaşa	2	(0)
2019	→ İstanbulspor (loan)	7	(0)
2019–2020	→ Nevşehir Belediyespor (loan)	28	(0)
2020	→ Sancaktepe (loan)	3	(0)
2021	→ Arnavutköy Belediyespor (loan)	12	(0)
2021–2023	→ İskenderunspor (loan)	58	(0)
2023–2024	İskenderunspor	34	(1)
2024–	68 Aksaray Belediyespor	39	(2)
- * Club domestic league appearances and goals as of 9 November 2025

Onur Ural (born 22 February 1997) is a Turkish professional footballer who plays as a right-back for TFF 2. Lig club 68 Aksaray Belediyespor.

== Professional career ==
Ural made his professional debut with Kasımpaşa in a 1-1 Süper Lig tie with Erzurumspor on 27 October 2018. On 9 January 2019, Ural joined İstanbulspor on loan for the rest of the season.
