= Haris Hajradinović =

Bosnian footballer (born 1994)

Personal information
- Date of birth: 18 February 1994 (age 32)
- Place of birth: Prilep, Republic of Macedonia
- Height: 1.78 m (5 ft 10 in)
- Position: Attacking midfielder

Team information
- Current team: Kasımpaşa
- Number: 10

Youth career
- Željezničar

Senior career*
| Years | Team | Apps | (Gls) |
| 2012 | Željezničar | 1 | (0) |
| 2012 | Olimpic | 5 | (0) |
| 2013 | Inter Zaprešić | 8 | (0) |
| 2013–2014 | Trenčín | 43 | (13) |
| 2014–2017 | Gent | 4 | (0) |
| 2016 | → Haugesund (loan) | 27 | (4) |
| 2017 | Haugesund | 14 | (2) |
| 2017–2019 | Osijek | 45 | (16) |
| 2019– | Kasımpaşa | 238 | (31) |

International career^{‡}
| 2012–2013 | Bosnia and Herzegovina U19 | 11 | (1) |
| 2014–2016 | Bosnia and Herzegovina U21 | 7 | (1) |
| 2019– | Bosnia and Herzegovina | 16 | (2) |
- * Club domestic league appearances and goals as of 22 November 2026 ‡ National team caps and goals as of 6 September 2025

Haris Hajradinović (pronounced [xâːris xajradîːnoʋitɕ]; born 18 February 1994) is a professional footballer who plays as an attacking midfielder for Süper Lig club Kasımpaşa. Born in the Republic of Macedonia, he plays for the Bosnia and Herzegovina national team.

Hajradinović started his professional career at Željezničar, before joining Olimpic in 2012. A year later, he moved to Inter Zaprešić. Later that year, he switched to Trenčín. The following year, he was transferred to Gent. In 2016, he was loaned to Haugesund, with whom he signed permanently a year after. Hajradinović moved to Osijek in 2017. Two years later, he joined Kasımpaşa.

A former youth international for Bosnia and Herzegovina, Hajradinović made his senior international debut in 2019, earning 16 caps since.

== Club career ==
=== Early career ===
Hajradinović came through Željezničar's youth academy. He made his professional debut against Kozara Gradiška on 20 May 2012 at the age of 18.

In June 2012, he switched to Olimpic.

In January 2013, he joined Croatian club Inter Zaprešić.

In the summer, Hajradinović signed with Slovak team Trenčín. On 14 September, he scored his first professional goal in a triumph over Žilina.

In December 2014, he was transferred to Belgian side Gent.

In January 2016, he was sent on a season-long loan to Norwegian outfit Haugesund, with an option to make the transfer permanent, which was activated the following year.

In August 2017, he moved to Osijek.

=== Kasımpaşa ===
In January 2019, Hajradinović joined Turkish team Kasımpaşa on a deal until June 2022. He made his official debut for the side on 17 January in a Turkish Cup tie against Alanyaspor. A week later, he made his league debut against Rizespor. On 7 February, he scored his first goal for Kasımpaşa in a Turkish Cup fixture against Akhisarspor. Three months later, he scored his first league goal against Beşiktaş.

Hajradinović made his 100th appearance for the club against Rizespor on 23 October 2021.

In June 2022, he extended his contract with the squad until June 2026.

In August, he was named team captain.

Hajradinović played his 173rd game for Kasımpaşa on 22 October against Sivasspor, becoming their top all-time appearance maker.

He appeared in his 200th match for the club against Gaziantep on 21 April 2024.

In September 2025, Hajradinović suffered a severe knee injury, which was diagnosed as an anterior cruciate ligament tear and was ruled out for at least six months. Over nine months after the injury, on 12 July 2026, he returned to the pitch.

In April, he signed a new two-year deal with Kasımpaşa.

== International career ==
Hajradinović represented Bosnia and Herzegovina at various youth levels.

In October 2019, he received his first senior call up, for UEFA Euro 2020 qualifiers against Italy and Liechtenstein. He debuted against the latter on 18 November.

On 7 September 2020, in a 2020–21 UEFA Nations League A game against Poland, Hajradinović scored his first senior international goal.

== Personal life ==
Hajradinović married his long-time girlfriend Belma in October 2021. Together they have one child.

He is a practising Muslim; together with international teammates Ermedin Demirović, Jusuf Gazibegović, Haris Tabaković, Nihad Mujakić, Dženis Burnić, Sead Kolašinac, Enver Kulašin, Nail Omerović, Benjamin Tahirović, Osman Hadžikić and Ermin Bičakčić he visited a mosque in Ilidža during the national team's concentration.

== Career statistics ==
=== Club ===
As of match played 22 November 2026

Appearances and goals by club, season and competition
| Club | Season | League | | | National cup (Note: Includes Bosnian Cup, Slovak Cup, Belgian Cup, Norwegian Cup, Croatian Cup, Turkish Cup) | | Continental | | Total | |
| Club | Season | Division | Apps | Goals | Apps | Goals | Apps | Goals | Apps | Goals |
|---|---|---|---|---|---|---|---|---|---|---|
| Željezničar | 2011–12 | Bosnian Premier League | 1 | 0 | 0 | 0 | – | | 1 | 0 |
| Olimpic | 2012–13 | Bosnian Premier League | 5 | 0 | 1 | 0 | – | | 6 | 0 |
| Inter Zaprešić | 2012–13 | Croatian Football League | 9 | 0 | – | | – | | 9 | 0 |
| Trenčín | 2013–14 | Slovak First League | 24 | 6 | 1 | 0 | 1 (Note: Appearance(s) in UEFA Europa League) | 0 | 26 | 6 |
| Trenčín | 2014–15 | Slovak First League | 19 | 7 | 3 | 1 | 4 | 0 | 26 | 8 |
| Trenčín | Total | | 43 | 13 | 4 | 1 | 5 | 0 | 52 | 14 |
| Gent | 2014–15 | Belgian Pro League | 4 | 0 | 1 | 0 | – | | 5 | 0 |
| Haugesund (loan) | 2016 | Eliteserien | 27 | 4 | 4 | 0 | – | | 31 | 4 |
| Haugesund | 2017 | Eliteserien | 14 | 2 | 4 | 0 | 3 | 2 | 21 | 4 |
| Haugesund | Total | | 41 | 6 | 8 | 0 | 3 | 2 | 52 | 8 |
| Osijek | 2017–18 | Croatian Football League | 28 | 9 | 2 | 0 | – | | 30 | 9 |
| Osijek | 2018–19 | Croatian Football League | 17 | 7 | 3 | 1 | 4 | 0 | 24 | 8 |
| Osijek | Total | | 45 | 16 | 5 | 1 | 4 | 0 | 54 | 17 |
| Kasımpaşa | 2018–19 | Süper Lig | 16 | 1 | 4 | 1 | – | | 20 | 2 |
| Kasımpaşa | 2019–20 | Süper Lig | 30 | 4 | 4 | 1 | – | | 34 | 5 |
| Kasımpaşa | 2020–21 | Süper Lig | 36 | 5 | 0 | 0 | – | | 36 | 5 |
| Kasımpaşa | 2021–22 | Süper Lig | 36 | 2 | 3 | 0 | – | | 39 | 2 |
| Kasımpaşa | 2022–23 | Süper Lig | 33 | 2 | 2 | 1 | – | | 35 | 3 |
| Kasımpaşa | 2023–24 | Süper Lig | 38 | 5 | 3 | 0 | – | | 41 | 5 |
| Kasımpaşa | 2024–25 | Süper Lig | 34 | 9 | 0 | 0 | – | | 34 | 9 |
| Kasımpaşa | 2025–26 | Süper Lig | 7 | 2 | 0 | 0 | – | | 7 | 2 |
| Kasımpaşa | 2026–27 | Süper Lig | 8 | 1 | 0 | 0 | – | | 8 | 1 |
| Kasımpaşa | Total | | 238 | 31 | 16 | 3 | – | | 254 | 34 |
| Career total | | | 386 | 66 | 35 | 5 | 12 | 2 | 433 | 73 |

=== International ===
As of match played 6 September 2025

Appearances and goals by national team and year
| National team | Year | Apps | Goals |
|---|---|---|---|
Bosnia and Herzegovina
| Bosnia and Herzegovina | 2019 | 1 | 0 |
| Bosnia and Herzegovina | 2020 | 3 | 1 |
| Bosnia and Herzegovina | 2021 | 1 | 0 |
| Bosnia and Herzegovina | 2022 | 0 | 0 |
| Bosnia and Herzegovina | 2023 | 2 | 0 |
| Bosnia and Herzegovina | 2024 | 6 | 0 |
| Bosnia and Herzegovina | 2025 | 3 | 1 |
| Total | | 16 | 2 |

Scores and results list Bosnia and Herzegovina's goal tally first, score column indicates score after each Hajradinović goal.

List of international goals scored by Haris Hajradinović
| No. | Date | Venue | Cap | Opponent | Score | Result | Competition |
|---|---|---|---|---|---|---|---|
| 1 | 7 September 2020 | Bilino Polje, Zenica, Bosnia and Herzegovina | 2 | Poland | 1–0 | 1–2 | 2020–21 UEFA Nations League A |
| 2 | 24 March 2025 | Bilino Polje, Zenica, Bosnia and Herzegovina | 14 | Cyprus | 2–1 | 2–1 | 2026 FIFA World Cup qualification |

== Honours ==
Željezničar

- Bosnian Premier League: 2011–12
- Bosnian Cup: 2011–12

Gent

- Belgian Pro League: 2014–15
- Belgian Super Cup: 2015
