= Yasin Özcan =

Turkish footballer (born 2006)

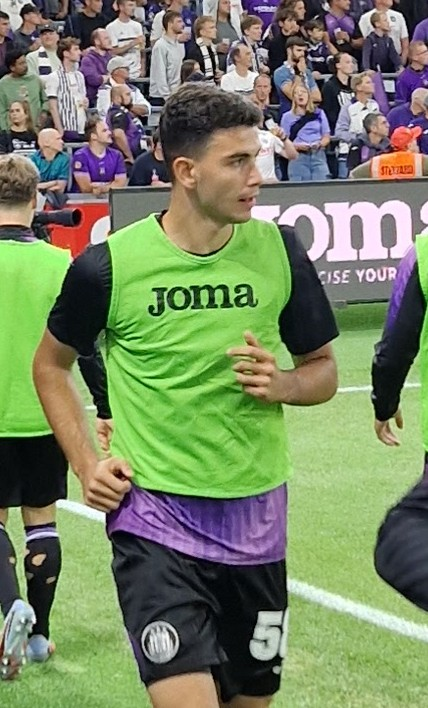
- Yasin Özcan at RSC Anderlecht in 2025

Personal information
- Full name: Yasin Özcan
- Date of birth: 20 April 2006 (age 20)
- Place of birth: Kâğıthane, Turkey
- Height: 1.85 m (6 ft 1 in)
- Positions: Centre-back; left-back

Team information
- Current team: Beşiktaş (on loan from Aston Villa)
- Number: 58

Youth career
- 2015–2017: İl Özel İdaresispor
- 2017–2018: Karadolap Gençlikspor
- 2018–2022: Kasımpaşa

Senior career*
Years	Team	Apps	(Gls)
2022–2025	Kasımpaşa	90	(5)
2025–	Aston Villa	0	(0)
2025–2026	→ Anderlecht (loan)	4	(0)
2025–2026	→ RSCA Futures (loan)	4	(0)
2026–	→ Beşiktaş (loan)	3	(0)

International career^{‡}
2022	Turkey U16	1	(0)
2022–2023	Turkey U17	10	(1)
2023–	Turkey U21	22	(0)
2025–	Turkey	1	(0)
- * Club domestic league appearances and goals as of 22:40, 22 November 2026 (UTC) ‡ National team caps and goals as of 22:53, 13 November 2026 (UTC)

Yasin Özcan (born 20 April 2006) is a Turkish professional footballer who plays as a centre-back or left-back for Süper Lig club Beşiktaş, on loan from Premier League club Aston Villa and the Turkey national team.

== Professional club career ==
=== Youth career and Kasımpașa ===
Özcan is a youth product of İl Özel İdaresispor, and Karadolap Gençlikspor before finishing his development at Kasımpaşa. He signed his first professional contract with Kasımpaşa in the summer of 2022 until 2025 at the age of 16.

On 8 August 2022, Özcan made his professional debut with Kasımpaşa as a substitute in a 4–0 Süper Lig loss to İstanbul Başakşehir. He scored his first senior goal in a 3–1 loss to İstanbul Başakşehir on 21 January 2023 at the age of 16 years and 276 days, becoming the youngest goalscorer in the league that season, and one of the youngest goalscorers in Europe.

On 11 October 2023, he was named by English newspaper The Guardian as one of the best players born in 2006 worldwide.

=== Aston Villa ===
On 10 February 2025, it was announced that Premier League club Aston Villa had agreed to sign Özcan and he would join the club ahead of their 2025–26 season. According to The Athletic, the two teams had agreed a compensation package of €7 million, with a further €1 million of add-ons.

He made his first appearance in a Villa shirt during a 1–0 friendly loss against EFL League Two club Walsall on 16 July 2025.

On 2 August 2025, Özcan joined Belgian Pro League club Anderlecht on a season-long loan.

On 28 January 2026, Özcan was recalled from his loan at Anderlecht, and joined Beşiktaş on a loan with an obligation to buy at the end of the season.

== International career ==
Özcan is a youth international for Turkey, having played up to the Turkey U21s.

He made his senior Turkey national team debut on 11 June 2025 in a friendly game against the Mexico national team.

== Career statistics ==
=== Club ===
As of match played 20 August 2026

Appearances and goals by club, season and competition
Club	Season	League			National cup (Note: Includes Turkish Cup, FA Cup, Belgian Cup)		Europe		Total	
Club	Season	Division	Apps	Goals	Apps	Goals	Apps	Goals	Apps	Goals
Kasımpaşa	2022–23	Süper Lig	19	2	1	0	—		20	2
Kasımpaşa	2023–24	Süper Lig	37	2	3	0	—		40	2
Kasımpaşa	2024–25	Süper Lig	34	1	0	0	—		34	1
Kasımpaşa	Total		90	5	4	0	—		94	5
Aston Villa	2025–26	Premier League	0	0	0	0	0	0	0	0
Anderlecht (loan)	2025–26	Belgian Pro League	4	0	0	0	2 (Note: Appearances in UEFA Conference League)	0	6	0
RSCA Futures (loan)	2025–26	Challenger Pro League	4	0	—		—		4	0
Beşiktaş (loan)	2025–26	Süper Lig	2	0	2	0	—		4	0
Beşiktaş (loan)	2026–27	Süper Lig	0	0	0	0	2 (Note: Appearances in UEFA Europa League)	0	2	0
Career total			100	5	6	0	4	0	110	5

=== International ===
As of match played 11 June 2025

Appearances and goals by national team and year
National team	Year	Apps	Goals
Turkey	2025	1	0
Total		1	0
