= Hasan Emre Yeşilyurt =

Turkish footballer

Personal information
- Date of birth: 18 August 2000 (age 26)
- Place of birth: Şişli, Turkey
- Height: 1.89 m (6 ft 2 in)
- Position: Midfielder

Team information
- Current team: Sarıyer (on loan from Çorum)
- Number: 28

Youth career
- 2012–2020: Kasımpaşa

Senior career*
Years	Team	Apps	(Gls)
2020–2024	Kasımpaşa	5	(0)
2022	→ 68 Aksaray Belediyespor (loan)	14	(1)
2022–2023	→ Kırklarelispor (loan)	31	(1)
2024–2026	Sarıyer	75	(2)
2026–	Çorum	0	(0)
2026–	→ Sarıyer (loan)	9	(0)
- * Club domestic league appearances and goals as of 6 November 2026

Hasan Emre Yeşilyurt (born 18 August 2000) is a Turkish professional footballer who plays as a midfielder for TFF 1. Lig club Sarıyer on loan from Çorum.

== Career ==
A youth product of Kasımpaşa, Yeşilyurt signed his first professional contract with the team on 5 October 2020. He made his professional debut with Kasımpaşa in a 3–0 Süper Lig loss to Fenerbahçe on 4 January 2021.
