= Selim Dilli =

Turkish association football player

Personal information
- Date of birth: 26 May 1998 (age 28)
- Place of birth: Beşikdüzü, Trabzon Province, Turkey
- Height: 1.77 m (5 ft 10 in)
- Position: Midfielder

Team information
- Current team: Muğlaspor
- Number: 25

Youth career
- 2011–2016: Trabzonspor

Senior career*
Years	Team	Apps	(Gls)
2016–2018	Çorum	22	(2)
2018–2019	Fatsa Belediyespor	28	(3)
2019–2021	Uşakspor	32	(3)
2021	Konyaspor	0	(0)
2021	→ 1922 Konyaspor (loan)	13	(3)
2021–2022	Artvin Hopaspor	36	(3)
2022–2024	Kasımpaşa	11	(0)
2023	→ Karaman (loan)	16	(2)
2024–2026	Serik Belediyespor	50	(1)
2026–	Muğlaspor	5	(0)

International career^{‡}
2022	Turkey U23	2	(0)
Medal record
Men's football
Representing Turkey
Islamic Solidarity Games
Gold medal – first place	2021 Konya
- * Club domestic league appearances and goals as of 7 November 2026 ‡ National team caps and goals as of 08:45, 2 February 2023 (UTC)

Selim Dilli (born 26 May 1998) is a Turkish footballer who plays as a midfielder for TFF 1. Lig club Muğlaspor.

== Professional career ==
Dilli is a youth product of Trabzonspor, and began his senior career with Çorum in the TFF Third League from 2016 until 2018. On 28 June 2022, he transferred to the Süper Lig club Kasımpaşa. He had a brief stint with Fatsa Belediyespor in the 2018–19 season. From 2019 to January 2021, he moved to Uşakspor in the TFF Second League. He shortly signed with Konyaspor and immediately went on loan with 1922 Konyaspor for the second half of the 2022–23 season. He moved to Hopaspor for the 2021–22 season, and after a strong performance signed with Kasımpaşa for the 2022–23 season in the Süper Lig. He made his professional debut with Kasımpaşa as a substitute in a 5–1 Süper Lig win over Giresunspor on 1 February 2023.

On 13 November 2025, Dilli was banned from playing for 3 months for his involvement in the 2025 Turkish football betting scandal.

== International career ==
Dilli represented the Turkey U23s in their winning campaign at the 2021 Islamic Solidarity Games.

== Honours ==
Turkey U23

- Islamic Solidarity Games: 2021
