= Taylan Utku Aydın =

Turkish footballer

Personal information
- Date of birth: 10 February 2006 (age 20)
- Place of birth: Bağcılar, Turkey
- Height: 1.80 m (5 ft 11 in)
- Position: Defender

Team information
- Current team: Ankara Demirspor (on loan from Kasımpaşa)
- Number: 29

Youth career
- 2016: Dikilitaş SK
- 2016–2023: Kasımpaşa

Senior career*
Years	Team	Apps	(Gls)
2023–	Kasımpaşa	18	(0)
2026–	→ Ankara Demirspor (loan)	7	(0)

International career^{‡}
2024	Turkey U18	9	(0)
2024–2025	Turkey U19	12	(0)
- * Club domestic league appearances and goals as of 18 October 2026 ‡ National team caps and goals as of 01:49, 13 May 2025 (UTC)

Taylan Utku Aydın (born 10 February 2006) is a Turkish professional footballer who plays as a defender for TFF 2. Lig club Ankara Demirspor on loan form Kasımpaşa.

== Club career ==
Aydın is a youth product of Dikilitaş SK and Kasımpaşa, before signing his first professional contract with the club in 2022. He made his senior and professional debut with Kasımpaşa as a substitute in a 3–0 loss to Fatih Karagümrük on 6 June 2023.

== International career ==
Aydın is a youth international for Turkey, having been called up to the Turkey U19s in November 2024.
