= Emre Gökay =

Turkish footballer (born 2006)

Personal information
- Date of birth: 18 February 2006 (age 20)
- Place of birth: Kocasinan, Turkey
- Height: 1.81 m (5 ft 11 in)
- Position: Winger

Team information
- Current team: Sivasspor
- Number: 21

Youth career
- 2015–2019: Erkiletspor
- 2019–2023: Sivasspor

Senior career*
Years	Team	Apps	(Gls)
2023–	Sivasspor	34	(1)

International career^{‡}
2021–2022	Turkey U16	12	(3)
2022–2023	Turkey U17	14	(5)
- * Club domestic league appearances and goals as of 6 May 2026 ‡ National team caps and goals as of 21:10, 11 October 2023 (UTC)

Emre Gökay (born 18 February 2006) is a Turkish professional footballer who plays as a winger for the Süper Lig Sivasspor.

== Club career ==
Gökay is a youth product of Erkiletspor and Sivasspor. On 1 June 2022, he signed his first professional contract with Sivasspor. He made his senior and professional debut with Sivasspor as a late substitute in a 4–1 UEFA Europa Conference League loss to Fiorentina on 16 March 2023. On 11 October 2023, he was named by English newspaper The Guardian as one of the best players born in 2006 worldwide.

== International career ==
Gökay is a youth international for Turkey, having played up to the Turkey U17 level.
