= Arif Morkaya =

Turkish footballer (born 1989)

Personal information
- Date of birth: 30 May 1989 (age 37)
- Place of birth: Eminönü, Turkey
- Height: 1.87 m (6 ft 2 in)
- Position: Midfielder

Youth career
- 2000–2003: Galatasaray
- 2003–2004: İstanbul Belediyespor
- 2004–2005: Bakırköyspor
- 2004–2007: İstanbulspor

Senior career*
Years	Team	Apps	(Gls)
2007–2009	İstanbulspor	19	(0)
2007	→ Bakırköyspor (loan)	2	(0)
2008	→ İstanbul Belediyespor (loan)	0	(0)
2009–2012	Darıca Gençlerbirliği	100	(12)
2012–2013	1461 Trabzon	5	(0)
2013–2017	Altınordu	135	(6)
2017–2018	Ankaragücü	35	(0)
2018–2019	İstanbulspor	16	(0)
2019	Fatih Karagümrük	12	(0)
2020	Boluspor	12	(0)
2020–2021	Tuzlaspor	16	(1)
2021–2022	Iğdır FK	32	(0)
2022–2023	1461 Trabzon FK	32	(0)
2023–2024	Altınordu	14	(0)
2024	Karabük İY	7	(0)

International career
2008	Turkey U19	3	(0)
- * Club domestic league appearances and goals as of 14 April 2024

Arif Morkaya (born 20 May 1989) is a Turkish footballer who plays as a midfielder.

== Career ==
Morkaya spent his early career in the lower tiers of Turkish football, with long spells at Darıca Gençlerbirliği, and Altınordu where he was captain. He joined Ankaragücü in 2017 and helped them get promoted to the Süper Lig. Morkaya made his professional debut with Ankaragücü in a 3–1 Süper Lig loss to Galatasaray on 10 August 2018.
