= Ali Demirel =

Turkish association football player

Personal information
- Full name: Ali Sühan Demirel
- Date of birth: 2 January 2003 (age 23)
- Place of birth: Lünen, Germany
- Height: 1.82 m (6 ft 0 in)
- Position: Forward

Team information
- Current team: Batman Petrolspor
- Number: 97

Youth career
- –2019: Preußen Münster
- 2019–2022: Bochum
- 2022–2023: Kasımpaşa

Senior career*
Years	Team	Apps	(Gls)
2022–2025	Kasımpaşa	9	(0)
2023–2024	→ 1461 Trabzon FK (loan)	19	(2)
2025	Petrolul Ploiești	5	(0)
2025–	Batman Petrolspor	5	(0)

International career^{‡}
2018–2019	Turkey U16	10	(3)
2019	Turkey U17	3	(3)
2021	Turkey U19	3	(0)
2023	Turkey U21	1	(0)
- * Club domestic league appearances and goals as of 30 November 2025 ‡ National team caps and goals as of 27 March 2023

Ali Sühan Demirel (born 2 January 2003) is a professional footballer who plays as a forward for TFF 2. Lig club Batman Petrolspor. Born in Germany, he represented Turkey at youth level.

== Professional career ==
Demirel is a youth product of the German clubs Preußen Münster and Bochum. He transferred to the Turkish club Kasımpaşa on 27 July 2022. He made his professional debut with Kasımpaşa as a substitute in a 1–0 Süper Lig loss to Kayserispor on 23 October 2022.

== International career ==
Born in Germany, Demirel is of Turkish descent. He is a youth international for Turkey, having played up to the Turkey U19s.
