= Berat Kalkan =

Macedonian footballer (born 2003)

Personal information
- Date of birth: 2 March 2003 (age 23)
- Place of birth: Eyüpsultan, Turkey
- Height: 1.71 m (5 ft 7 in)
- Position: Left wing

Team information
- Current team: Altınordu
- Number: 7

Youth career
- 2003–2015: Öz Alibeyköy
- 2015–2016: Altınordu
- 2016–2020: Kasımpaşa

Senior career*
Years	Team	Apps	(Gls)
2020–2025	Kasımpaşa	13	(0)
2021	→ Karacabey Belediyespor (loan)	6	(0)
2023–2024	→ Karşıyaka (loan)	5	(0)
2024–2025	→ Gostivar (loan)	10	(0)
2025	Etimesgutspor	7	(0)
2025–	Altınordu	6	(0)

International career^{‡}
2020	North Macedonia U18	1	(0)
2020	North Macedonia U19	3	(0)
2021–2024	North Macedonia U21	17	(4)
- * Club domestic league appearances and goals as of 1 June 2024 ‡ National team caps and goals as of 24 March 2024

Berat Kalkan (Macedonian: Берат Калкан; born 2 March 2003) is a professional footballer who plays as a winger for TFF 2. Lig club Altınordu. Born in Turkey to Albanian parents, he is a former youth international for North Macedonia.

== Professional career ==
Kalkan made his professional debut with Kasımpaşa in a 2-0 Süper Lig win over Gençlerbirliği S.K. on 29 November 2020.

== International career ==
Born in Turkey, Kalkan is of Albanian descent from Tetovo. He has represented the North Macedonia U18, and U19s.
