= Ali Emre Yanar =

Turkish footballer

Personal information
- Date of birth: 15 May 1998 (age 28)
- Place of birth: Konak, Türkiye
- Height: 1.90 m (6 ft 3 in)
- Position: Goalkeeper

Team information
- Current team: Kasımpaşa
- Number: 25

Youth career
- 2007: Altındağ
- 2007–2013: Bucaspor
- 2013–2016: Altınordu

Senior career*
Years	Team	Apps	(Gls)
2016–2023	Altınordu	67	(0)
2019	→ Niğde Anadolu (loan)	15	(0)
2020–2021	→ Niğde Anadolu (loan)	34	(0)
2023–	Kasımpaşa	9	(0)
- * Club domestic league appearances and goals as of 10 June 2026

Ali Emre Yanar (born 15 May 1998) is a Turkish professional footballer who plays as a goalkeeper for Kasımpaşa.

== Career ==
Yanar is a youth product of Altındağ, Bucaspor and Altınordu. He began his senior career as the backup goalkeeper with Altınordu in 2016. He had three loans with Niğde Anadolu between 2019 and 2021. In May 2023, he fractured his nose in a 3–3 TFF First League tie with Bandırmaspor, and had to have surgery to have it fixed. He returned to Altınordu for the 2021–2022 season. Altınordu was relegated in the 2022–23 season, but Yanar had one of the highest save percentages in the league.th 3.5 saves per match. On 1 August 2023, he transferred to Kasımpaşa on a three-year contract. He made his professional debut with Kasımpaşa in a 3–3 Süper Lig tie with Alanyaspor on 17 September 2023.

On 13 November 2025, Yanar was banned from playing for 45 days for his involvement in the 2025 Turkish football betting scandal.

== Career statistics ==
=== Club ===
As of match played 2 February 2025

Appearances and goals by club, season and competition
Club	Season	League			National cup		Europe		Total	
Club	Season	Division	Apps	Goals	Apps	Goals	Apps	Goals	Apps	Goals
Altınordu	2016–17	TFF 1. Lig	1	0	0	0	—		1	0
Altınordu	2017–18	TFF 1. Lig	1	0	1	0	—		2	0
Altınordu	2018–19	TFF 1. Lig	0	0	0	0	—		0	0
Altınordu	2019–20	TFF 1. Lig	0	0	4	0	—		4	0
Altınordu	2020–21	TFF 1. Lig	0	0	—		—		0	0
Altınordu	2021–22	TFF 1. Lig	33	0	0	0	—		33	0
Altınordu	2022–23	TFF 1. Lig	32	0	0	0	—		32	0
Altınordu	Total		67	0	5	0	—		72	0
Niğde Anadolu (loan)	2018–19	TFF 2. Lig	14	0	—		—		14	0
Niğde Anadolu (loan)	2020–21	TFF 2. Lig	34	0	1	0	—		35	0
Kasımpaşa	2023–24	Süper Lig	7	0	3	0	—		10	0
Kasımpaşa	2024–25	Süper Lig	1	0	2	0	—		3	0
Kasımpaşa	2025–26	Süper Lig	0	0	0	0	—		0	0
Kasımpaşa	Total		8	0	5	0	—		13	0
Career total			123	0	10	0	0	0	133	0
