= Furkan Külekçi =

Turkish footballer

Personal information
- Date of birth: 28 June 2001 (age 25)
- Place of birth: Giresun, Turkey
- Height: 1.78 m (5 ft 10 in)
- Position: Forward

Youth career
- 2014–2018: Eyüpspor
- 2018–2020: Kasımpaşa

Senior career*
Years	Team	Apps	(Gls)
2020–2023	Kasımpaşa	4	(0)
2021–2022	→ Büyük Anadolu (loan)	14	(0)
2022–2023	→ Edirnespor (loan)	2	(0)
2023	→ Niğde Anadolu (loan)	9	(0)
- * Club domestic league appearances and goals as of 20 May 2023

Furkan Külekçi (born 28 June 2001) is a Turkish football player who plays as a forward.

== Professional career ==
Külekçi is a youth product of Eyüpspor and Kasımpaşa, and signed his first professional contract with the latter in December 2020. He made his professional debut with Kasımpaşa in a 3-0 Süper Lig loss to Fenerbahçe on 4 January 2021.
