= Mickaël Tırpan =

Belgian footballer

Personal information
- Full name: Mickaël Sylvain Tırpan
- Date of birth: 23 October 1993 (age 33)
- Place of birth: Anderlecht, Belgium
- Height: 1.77 m (5 ft 10 in)
- Position: Right back

Senior career*
Years	Team	Apps	(Gls)
2011–2012	Dender	9	(0)
2013–2014	R. Francs Borains	6	(0)
2014–2015	Seraing United	23	(3)
2015–2017	Mouscron-Péruwelz	37	(0)
2017–2018	Eupen	32	(1)
2018–2020	Lokeren	20	(1)
2020–2021	Kasımpaşa	30	(1)
2021	→ Fortuna Sittard (loan)	12	(1)
2021–2022	Fortuna Sittard	31	(0)
2022–2023	Kasımpaşa	23	(0)
2023–2024	Samsunspor	7	(0)
2024	Lierse	11	(0)
2024–2025	Willem II	27	(1)
Total		268	(8)
- * Club domestic league appearances and goals

Mickaël Sylvain Tırpan (born 23 October 1993) is a Belgian retired footballer.

== Career ==
Tırpan joined Süper Lig side Kasımpaşa on 24 January 2020. He made his Süper Lig debut on week 19 encounter of 2019–20 season against Alanyaspor, in which Kasımpaşa lost 1–2, on 25 January 2020. He scored his first goal at Süper Lig on 30 October 2020, against Trabzonspor, where Kasımpaşa won 3–4.

On 10 January 2021 Tırpan joined Dutch club, Fortuna Sittard on loan until the end of the season.

On 24 January 2024, Tırpan signed a 2.5-year contract with Lierse.

On 2 July 2024, Tırpan returned to the Netherlands and signed a two-year contract with Willem II.

On 11 September 2025, Tirpan announced his retirement from football after he had been diagnosed with sarcoidosis.

== Personal life ==
Tırpan was born in Anderlecht, Belgium. His father is Turkish and he was eligible to play for Turkey national team.
