= Mortadha Ben Ouanes =

Tunisian footballer (born 1994)

Ahmed Mortadha Ouanes
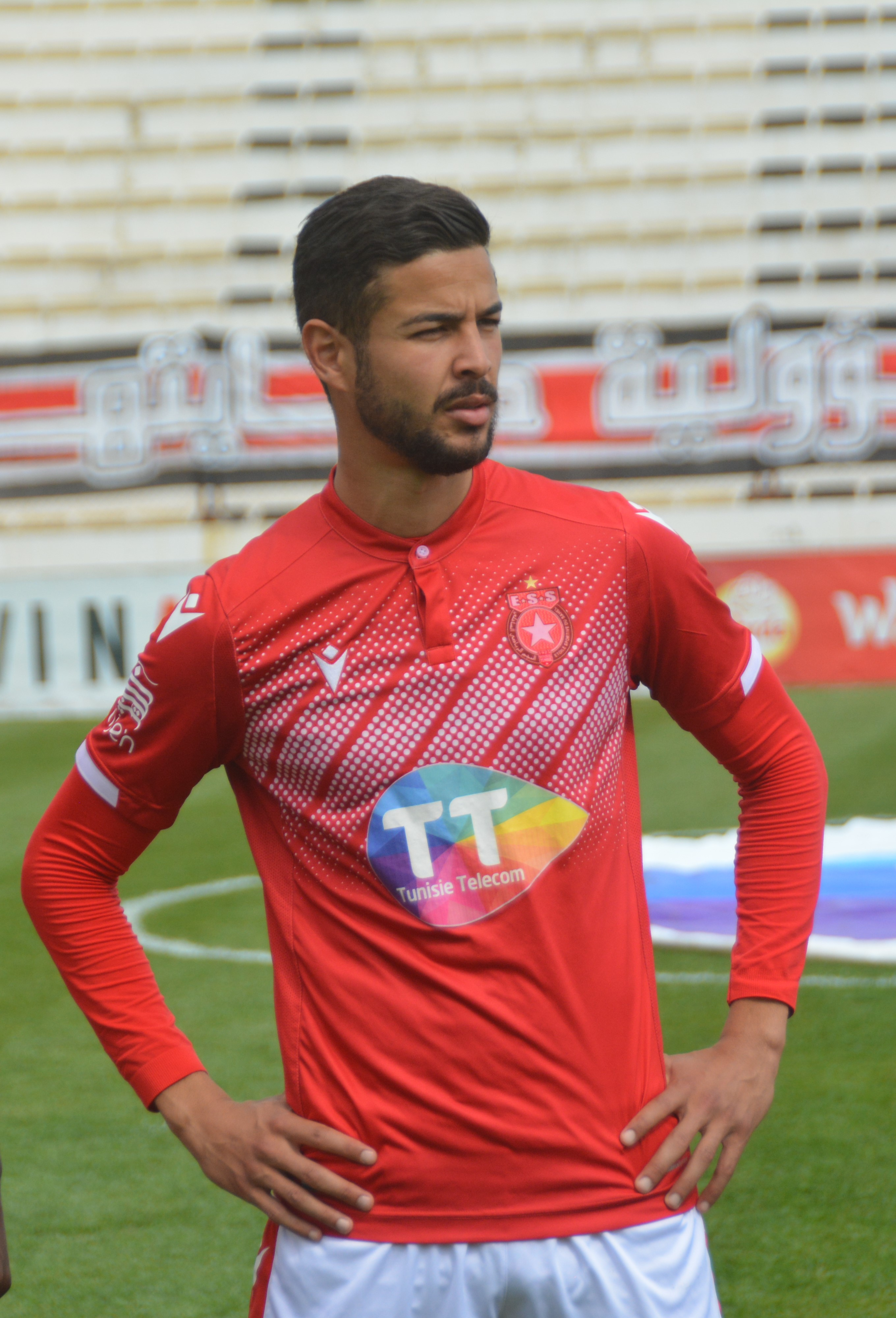
- Mortadha with ES Sahel in 2021

Personal information
- Full name: Ahmed Mortadha ben Ouanes
- Date of birth: 2 July 1994 (age 32)
- Place of birth: Sousse, Tunisia
- Height: 1.82 m (6 ft 0 in)
- Position: Left-back

Team information
- Current team: Kasımpaşa
- Number: 12

Youth career
- 2010–2012: ES Sahel

Senior career*
Years	Team	Apps	(Gls)
2013–2015	ES Sahel	4	(0)
2015	→ US Monastir	1	(0)
2015–2018	CA Bizertin	55	(5)
2018–2021	ES Sahel	55	(7)
2021–	Kasımpaşa	148	(20)

International career^{‡}
2019–	Tunisia	19	(0)
- * Club domestic league appearances and goals as of 10 June 2026 ‡ National team caps and goals as of 21:50, 26 June 2026 (UTC)

Ahmed Mortadha ben Ouanes (Arabic: مرتضى بن وناس; born 2 July 1994) is a Tunisian professional footballer who plays as a left-back for Süper Lig club Kasımpaşa and the Tunisia national team.

== Club career ==
Mortadha is trained at the Etoile Sportive du Sahel (ESS), where he goes through all categories of young people. He started in the first division during the 2013–14 season.

In January 2015, he was loaned for six months to the Monastiran Sports Union. His loan with this team turned out to be a failure, since he only played one match in the league.

In July 2015, he transferred to the Bizertin Athletic Club (CAB) With this team, he scored four league goals during the 2015–16 season.

In January 2018, he found his training club.

During the 2019–20 season, he scored four league goals with ESS.

He participates with the same club in the CAF Champions League, the CAF Confederation Cup and the CAF Supercup. He is thus quarter-finalist of the Champions League in 2020.

On July 2, 2021, at the end of his contract with ESS, he signed a two-year deal with Kasımpaşa SK.

== International career ==
Ben Ouanes played his first match for the Tunisia national team on 21 September 2019, in a friendly against Libya. This match won 1–0 is part of the qualifiers for the 2020 African Nations Championship.

In December 2023, he was included in the list of 27 Tunisian players selected by Jalel Kadri to compete in the 2023 Africa Cup of Nations, but he withdrew for family reasons.

On 15 May 2026, Ben Ouanes was named in the Tunisia squad for the 2026 FIFA World Cup.

== Honours ==
ES Sahel

- Arab Club Champions Cup: 2018–19
