= Mamadou Fall (footballer, born 1991) =

Senegalese footballer (born 1991)

Personal information
- Date of birth: 31 December 1991 (age 34)
- Place of birth: Ziguinchor, Senegal
- Height: 1.84 m (6 ft 0 in)
- Position: Right winger

Team information
- Current team: İstanbulspor
- Number: 27

Senior career*
Years	Team	Apps	(Gls)
2013–2016	White Star Bruxelles	91	(27)
2016–2022	Charleroi	111	(23)
2018–2019	→ Eupen (loan)	30	(4)
2021–2026	Kasımpaşa	141	(29)
2026	→ Bandirmaspor (loan)	15	(1)
2026–	İstanbulspor	9	(1)

International career^{‡}
2021–	Senegal	1	(0)
- * Club domestic league appearances and goals as of 7 November 2026 ‡ National team caps and goals as of 30 March 2021

Mamadou Fall (born 31 December 1991) is a Senegalese professional footballer who plays a right winger for Turkish TFF 1. Lig club İstanbulspor.

== Club career ==
In September 2018, after not featuring regularly for their senior side, Charleroi loaned Fall to Eupen for the remainder of the 2018–19 Belgian First Division A season.

In January 2022 Fall joined Kasımpaşa in Turkey and signed a two-and-a-half-year contract. Fall joined the Turkish 1. Lig club Bandırmaspor on loan 2 February 2026.

On September 5, 2026, he transferred to İstanbulspor on a one-year contract.

== International career ==
He made his debut for Senegal national football team on 30 March 2021 in a 2021 Africa Cup of Nations qualifier against Eswatini.
