= Recep Tayyip Erdoğan Stadium =

Association football stadium in the Kasımpaşa neighbourhood of Istanbul, Turkey

Coordinates: 41°01′58″N 28°58′21″E

Recep Tayyip Erdoğan Stadyumu
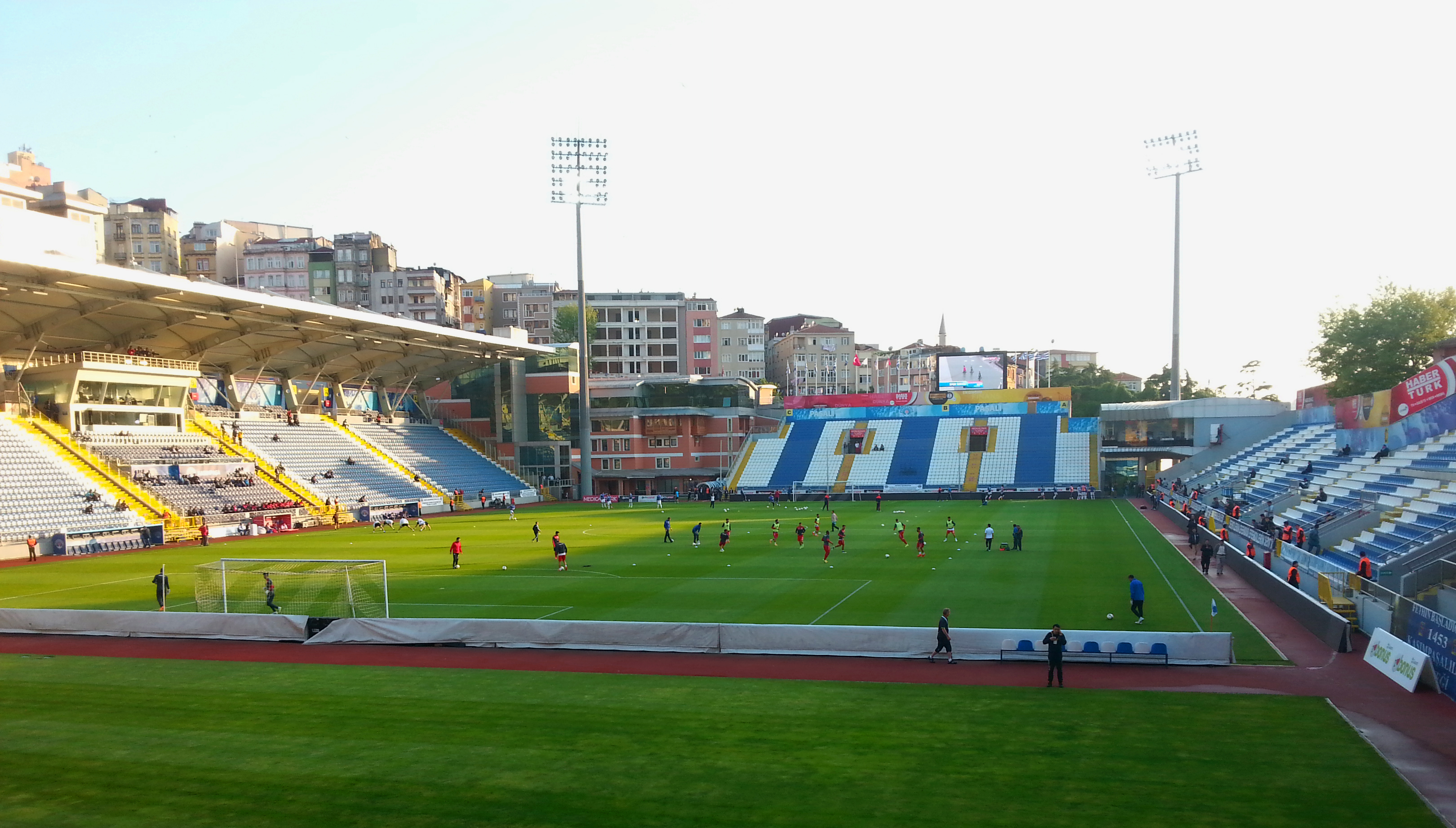

- Location in Istanbul Location in Turkey
- Former names: Kasımpaşa Stadium
- Location: Istanbul, Turkey
- Capacity: 14,234
- Executive suites: 12
- Surface: Grass
- Field size: 105m x 68m

Construction
- Built: 2004–05
- Opened: 2005

Tenants
- Eyüpspor, Kasımpaşa S.K.

Recep Tayyip Erdoğan Stadium (also known as Kasımpaşa Stadium) is a multi-use stadium in the Kasımpaşa neighbourhood of Istanbul, Turkey. It is currently used mostly for football matches, and is the home stadium of Kasımpaşa S.K. The stadium capacity was extended to 14,234 spectators.

== Usage ==
Due to extension work, Kasımpaşa played most of its home matches at the Atatürk Olympic Stadium in the 2007–2008 season. It is named after the incumbent Turkish President Recep Tayyip Erdoğan, a native of Kasımpaşa and a football player in his youth.

== Gallery ==
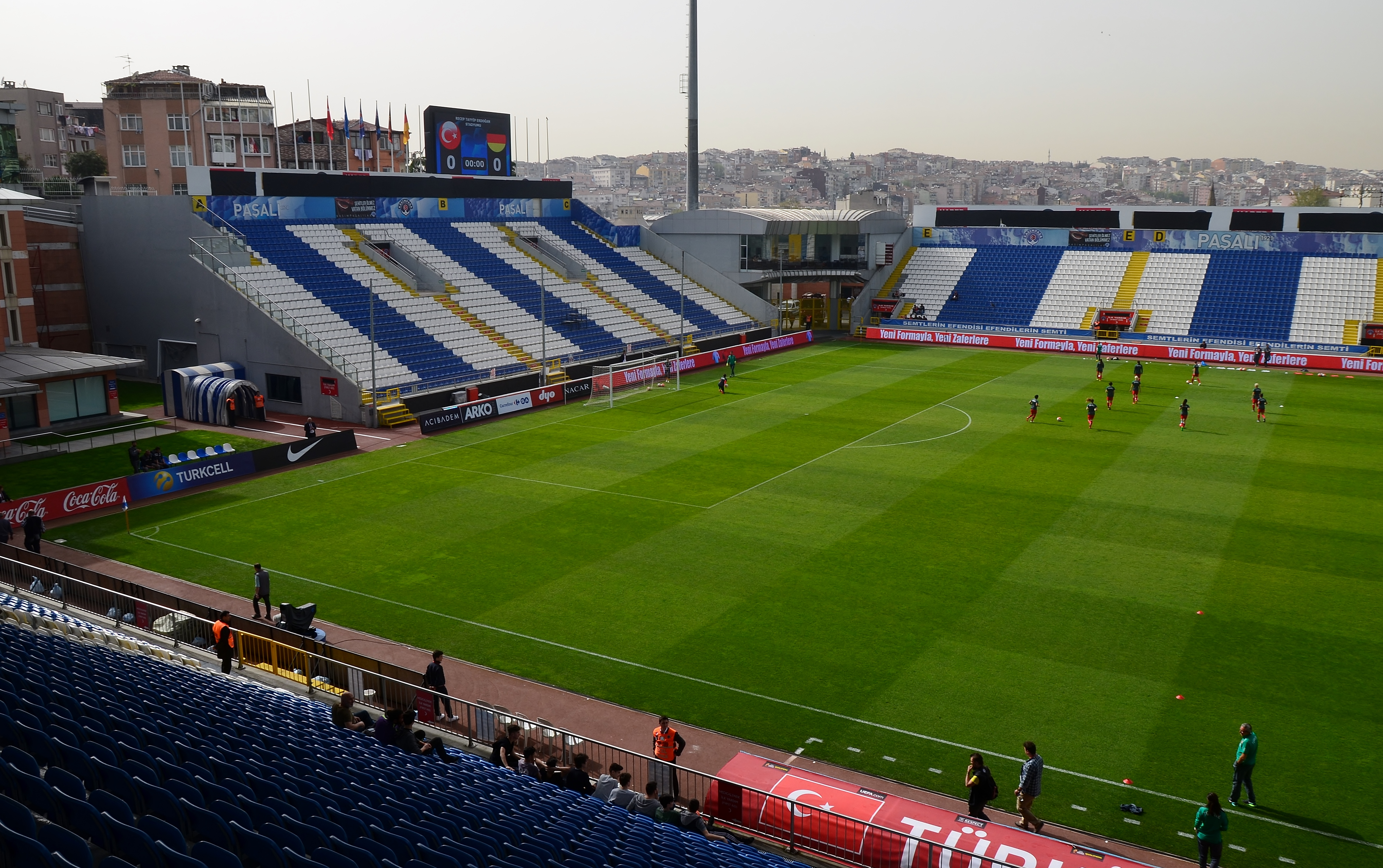
Recep Tayyip Erdoğan stadium

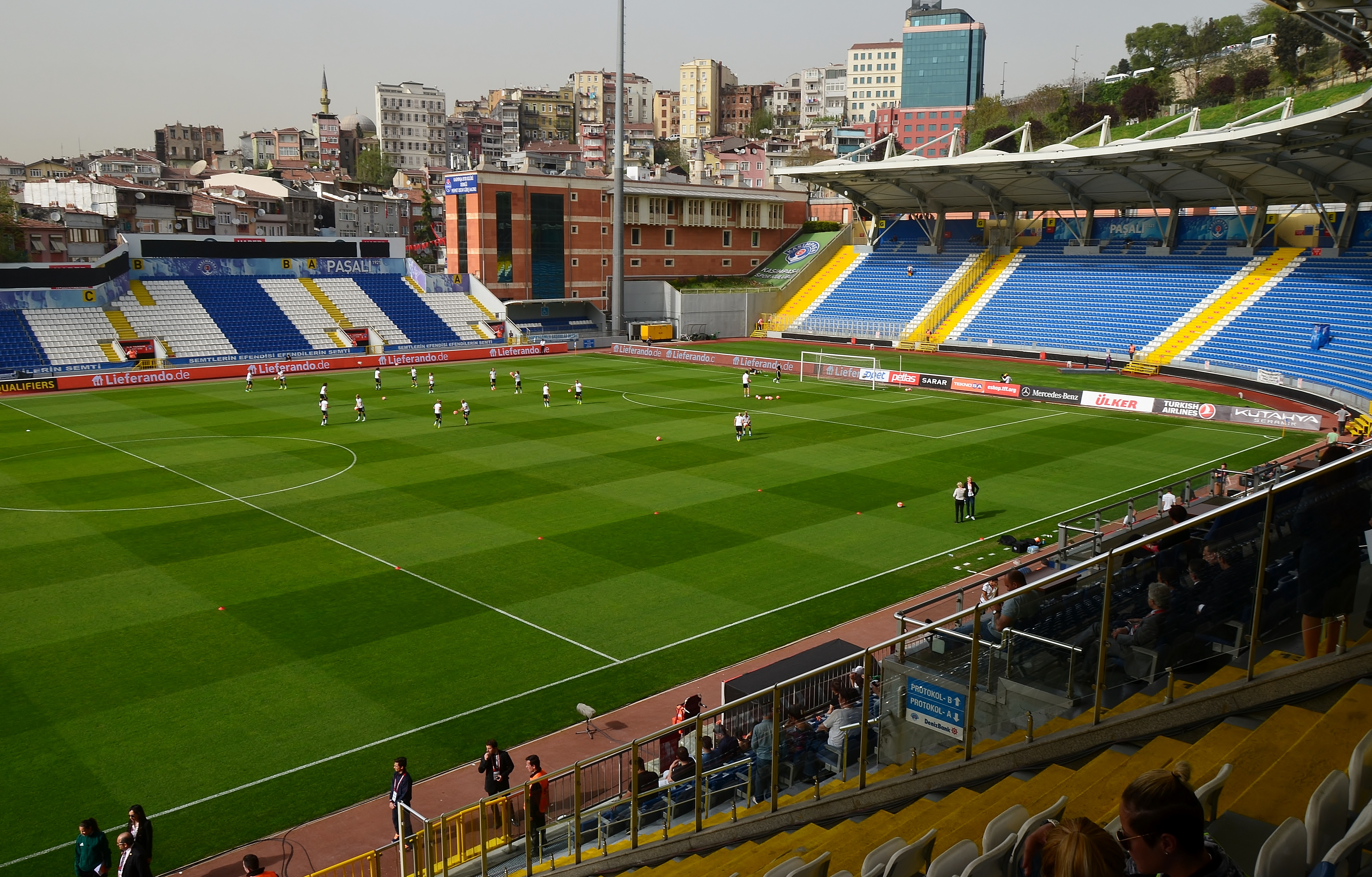
Recep Tayyip Erdoğan stadium
