= Kasımpaşa S.K. =

Turkish professional football club

Kasımpaşa
- Full name: Kasımpaşa Sportif Faaliyetler A.Ş.
- Nickname: Apaçiler (Apaches)
- Founded: 15 January 1921; 105 years ago as Kasımpaşa Gençlik Kulübü
- Stadium: Recep Tayyip Erdoğan Stadium
- Capacity: 14,234
- Coordinates: 41°01′58″N 28°58′21″E
- Owner: Kazancı Holding
- President: Davut Dişli
- Head coach: Alfred Schreuder
- League: Süper Lig
- 2025–26: Süper Lig, 13th of 18
- Website: kasimpasa.com.tr
Home colours	Away colours

Kasımpaşa Spor Kulübü (Turkish pronunciation: [kaˈsɯmpaʃa]), commercially registered as Kasımpaşa Sportif Faaliyetler A.Ş. and commonly referred to simply as Kasımpaşa, is a Turkish professional football club based in the Kasımpaşa neighbourhood, Beyoğlu district of Istanbul, Turkey. Founded in 1921, the club has a long-standing presence in Turkish football and has competed in various divisions of the national league system, spending much of its modern history in the Süper Lig, the highest tier of Turkish football.

Kasımpaşa play their home matches at the Recep Tayyip Erdoğan Stadium, located in the Kasımpaşa neighbourhood of Beyoğlu. The stadium, which has a capacity of approximately 14,000 spectators, is named after the current President of Turkey, Recep Tayyip Erdoğan, who was born and raised in the area and played for the club at youth level.

As of the 2026–27 Süper Lig season, Kasımpaşa is one of five clubs from Istanbul competing in the Turkish top flight, alongside Fenerbahçe, Galatasaray, Beşiktaş and İstanbul Başakşehir.

In November 2021, Kasımpaşa officially marked its centenary with a series of events and commemorations celebrating its 100 years of existence, paying tribute to its historical roots, local community ties, and enduring presence in Turkish football culture.

== History ==
Kasımpaşa was founded in 1921 as Kasımpaşa Gençlik Kulübü after the merger of Altıntuğ and Kasımpaşa Terbiye-i Bedeniye Kulübü the club’s first competitive matches came in the 1923–24 season. They competed in the İstanbul First League in 1939–45 and 1946–59, then joined the national league in 1959 and stayed five seasons, recording a best finish of 5th in 1961–62.

After decades outside the top flight, Kasımpaşa earned successive promotions from the TFF 3. Lig to the Süper Lig across 2004–05 to 2006–07. Promotion was clinched on 30 May 2007 by defeating Altay on penalties (4–3) after a draw in the play-off final. The club were relegated after the 2007–08 season, but returned on 17 May 2009 by beating Karşıyaka 2–1 (a.e.t.) in Ankara to win the First League play-off final.

In the 2009–10 campaign Kasımpaşa finished 11th and recorded notable results: a 3–1 away league win at Fenerbahçe, a 3–1 away win at Beşiktaş in the Turkish Cup group phase, and a 3–1 home win over Trabzonspor.

Kasımpaşa were relegated from the Süper Lig at the end of the 2010–11 season under coach Yılmaz Vural. On 12 October 2011, businessman Turgay Ciner’s group acquired a controlling stake in the club, marking a new ownership period focused on squad rebuilding and facilities investment. The club won promotion immediately in 2011–12 through the play-offs: a 2–0 away and 4–0 home semi-final over Konyaspor preceded a 3–2 victory against Adanaspor in the Istanbul final on 27 May 2012.

Back in the top flight, Kasımpaşa posted consecutive 6th-place finishes in 2012–13 and 2013–14, narrowly missing European qualification. The squad was strengthened with high-profile arrivals, notably Sweden captain Andreas Isaksson (from PSV) in 2012, Ryan Babel in 2013, and later Egypt international Trézéguet, who was eventually sold to Aston Villa in 2019. The club began 2018–19 at the top end of the table on the back of a prolific first half by Mbaye Diagne (20 league goals by January); Diagne then transferred to Galatasaray for a reported €10 million — a club-record fee received — and Kasımpaşa slipped to 14th by season’s end.

In 2021–22 the team mounted a dramatic mid-season recovery, rising from the relegation places to finish 11th; on-loan forward Umut Bozok won the league golden boot with 20 goals. They finished 10th in 2022–23 despite multiple coaching changes, and climbed to 5th in 2023–24 — equalling the best league placing in club history in the modern era.

Alongside transfer-market recruitment, Kasımpaşa’s academy has supplied the first team and the market; recent graduates include left-back Eren Elmalı (sold to Trabzonspor in 2022) and teenage defender Yasin Özcan. The club plays at the Recep Tayyip Erdoğan Stadium in Kasımpaşa, with an all-seater capacity of 14,234 following renovations, as listed by the Turkish Football Federation.

The club had cycled rapidly through coaches during the 2024–25 season: they parted company with Sami Uğurlu on 7 November 2024, appointed Hakan Keleş on 14 November 2024, then ended his spell on 28 January 2025, before hiring Burak Yılmaz on 30 January 2025; Yılmaz announced his departure in late June 2025. The churn fit a longer pattern: under Ciner Group ownership (since 2011) Kasımpaşa went through 23 head-coach changes in 13 years, according to Turkish press tallies.

In June 2025 Kasımpaşa re-appointed former coach Shota Arveladze to lead the senior team.

== Grounds ==
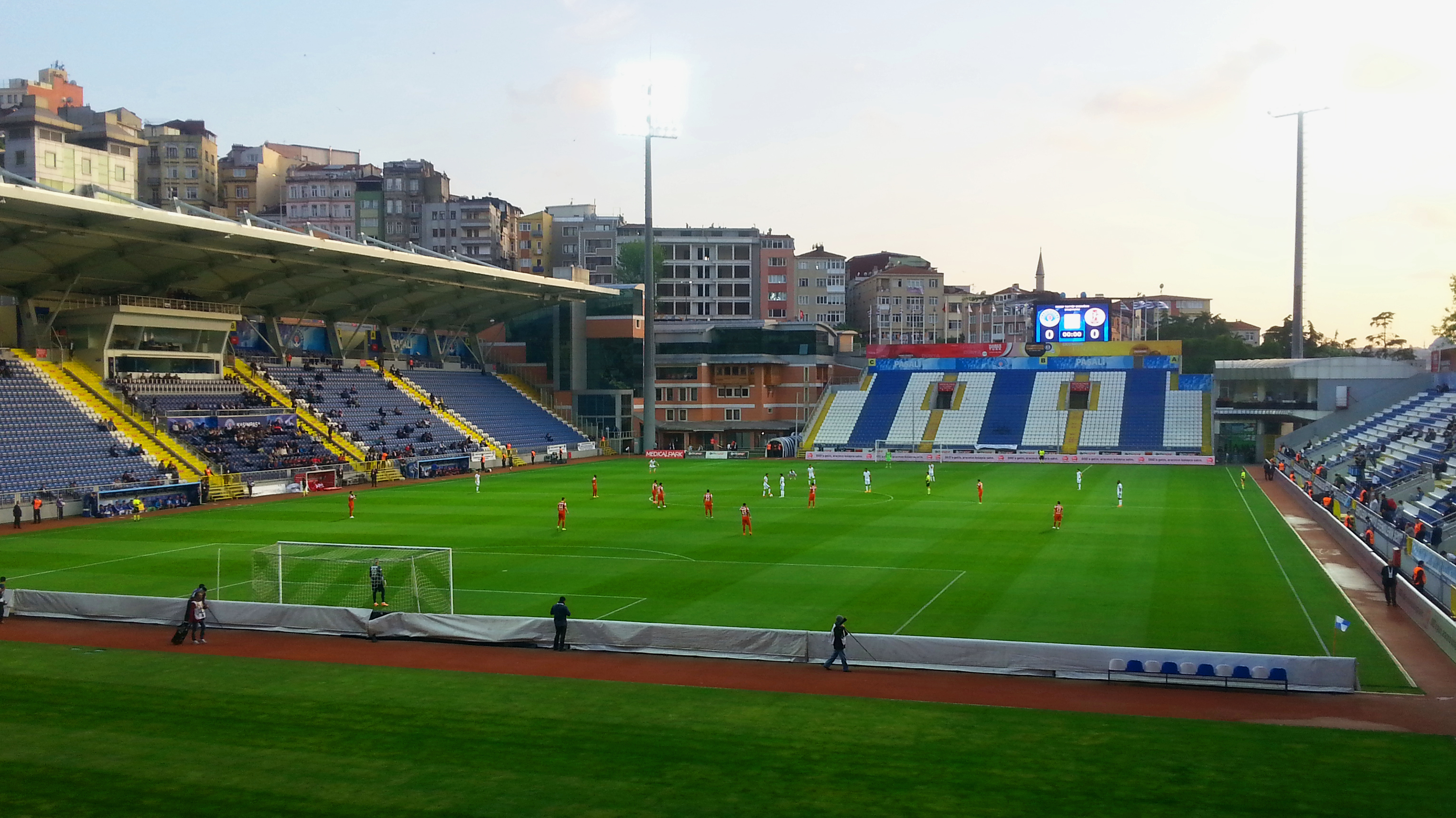
An image from the home match against Balıkesirspor in the 2014–15 season.

=== Recep Tayyip Erdoğan Stadium ===
Located in the Kasımpaşa neighbourhood of Istanbul, the ground was rebuilt in 2004–05 and opened in 2005 on the site of a local athletics venue; later works in 2010 removed the running track and completed the bowl with new stands. It is also referred to as Kasımpaşa Stadium and is the home ground of Kasımpaşa; the all-seated capacity is listed by the Turkish Football Federation as 13,797. The stadium is named after Recep Tayyip Erdoğan, a native of Kasımpaşa and former amateur footballer, who grew up in the district.

=== Kasımpaşa Kemerburgaz Tesisleri ===
Kasımpaşa’s training base and social facilities are located in Kemerburgaz. Branded as the Turgay Ciner Sports Facilities, the complex houses training pitches, medical and recovery areas, and club operations; the club lists the site as its primary practice hub. The Ciner Group also lists the Kemerburgaz address among Kasımpaşa’s facilities, together with the stadium site in Kasımpaşa.

== Colours and crest ==
Kasımpaşa’s traditional colours are navy blue and white. First-choice kits are typically dark blue with white trim, while alternative strips often introduce light blue tones; the club’s official materials and matchwear use this palette consistently.

The current crest is a circular badge bearing the inscription “Kasımpaşa Spor Kulübü” and the founding year 1921 around a central device that features a white crescent-and-star on red and a stylised anchor motif; the design appears in the club’s navy/white colours across official channels and team apparel.

=== Kit manufacturers and shirt sponsors ===
Period	Kit manufacturer	Shirt sponsor
2009–10	Lotto	Turkcell
2010–11	Lescon	Kasımpaşa 90. Yıl
2011–12	Lescon	Kasımpaşa 91. Yıl
2012–13	Lotto	UCZ
2013–14	adidas	UCZ
2014–15	adidas	–
2015–16	Nike	–
2016–17	Nike	Halley
2017–18	Nike	Ciner
2018–19	Nike	Ciner
2019–20	Nike	Ciner
2020–21	Nike	Ciner
2021–22	Puma	Ciner
2022–23	Puma	Ciner
2023–24	Puma	Ciner
2024–	adidas	Ciner

== Supporters ==
Kasımpaşa’s support is strongly neighbourhood-based: home followings are drawn primarily from the Kasımpaşa quarter of Beyoğlu and nearby Golden Horn districts, with a compact all-seater home ground that amplifies noise on matchdays. In recent top-flight seasons, the club has recorded mid-thousands average gates at Recep Tayyip Erdoğan Stadium, consistent with the venue’s 13,797 all-seated capacity listed by the Turkish Football Federation.

The club and its fans are commonly referred to as “Paşa”, reflecting the district identity and the navy-blue/white colours worn in the stands. The fanbase gained wider visibility in the 2000s and 2010s as the stadium—named for Kasımpaşa-born president Recep Tayyip Erdoğan—became a recurring reference point in coverage of football and politics in Istanbul.

Ticketing for home sections is operated through the national Passolig system, with season-ticket (kombine) sales and match-day information handled by the club’s ticketing channels.

== Rivalries ==
As a centrally located İstanbul club, Kasımpaşa’s league fixtures against the city’s heavyweights — Beşiktaş, Galatasaray and Fenerbahçe — are treated in the Turkish press as İstanbul derbileri (Istanbul derbies). Kasımpaşa also contest periodic city derbies with İstanbul Başakşehir and Fatih Karagümrük.

The latter rivalry dates back to the clubs’ early years; because the grounds are a short trip apart and both teams are neighbourhood sides, these meetings have traditionally drawn strong local interest and some of the highest gates for either club. Matches between the two are commonly known as the Haliç Derby (see Fatih Karagümrük–Kasımpaşa derby).

== Honours ==
- 2. Lig
  - Winners (1): 2005–06
- 3. Lig
  - Winners (3): 1988–89, 1996–97, 2004–05

== Statistics ==
=== Results of League and Cup Competitions by Season ===
Season	League table										Turkish Cup	Top scorer	
Season	League	Pos	P	W	D	L	GF	GA	GD	Pts	Turkish Cup	Player	Goals
~~No data prior to 2006.~~
2006–07	1. Lig	5th↑	14	14	10	10	53	41	+12	52	R2	Erhan Küçük	17
2007–08	Süper Lig	18th↓	34	8	5	21	26	56	−30	29	R2	Jonathan Téhoué	6
2008–09	1. Lig	4th↑	34	15	10	9	45	27	+18	55	R1	Erhan Küçük	14
2009–10	Süper Lig	11th	34	10	11	13	50	53	−3	41	PO	André Moritz	9
2010–11	Süper Lig	18th↓	34	5	8	21	31	71	−40	23	QF	Ersen Martin	8
2011–12	1. Lig	4th↑	34	16	11	7	50	39	+11	59	R4	Nikolai Dimitrov	14
2012–13	Süper Lig	6th	34	14	8	12	48	37	+11	50	R5	Kalu Uche	19
2013–14	Süper Lig	6th	34	13	12	9	56	39	+17	51	R2	Ezequiel Scarione	16
2014–15	Süper Lig	13th	34	9	10	15	56	73	−17	37	R3	Ezequiel Scarione	13
2015–16	Süper Lig	7th	34	14	8	12	50	40	+10	50	R3	Eren Derdiyok	13
2016–17	Süper Lig	10th	34	12	7	15	46	49	−3	43	SF	Adem Büyük	9
2017–18	Süper Lig	8th	34	13	7	14	57	58	−1	46	R5	Trézéguet	13
2018–19	Süper Lig	14th	34	11	6	17	53	62	−9	39	QF	Mbaye Diagne	20
2019–20	Süper Lig	10th	34	12	7	15	53	58	−5	43	L16	Fodé Koita	12
2020–21	Süper Lig	14th	40	12	10	18	47	57	−10	46	L16	Isaac Kiese Thelin	9
2021–22	Süper Lig	11th	38	15	8	15	67	57	+10	53	L16	Umut Bozok	20
2022–23	Süper Lig	10th	36	12	7	17	45	61	−16	43	R5	Mamadou Fall	8
2023–24	Süper Lig	5th	38	16	8	14	62	65	−3	56	R5	Nuno da Costa	14
2024–25	Süper Lig	10th	36	11	14	11	62	63	−1	47	GS	Nuno da Costa	13
2025–26	Süper Lig	TBD											

=== League affiliation ===
- Süper Lig: 1959–64, 2007–08, 2009–11, 2012–
- 1. Lig 1964–68, 1989–92, 1997–2000, 2006–07, 2008–09, 2011–12
- 2. Lig: 1968–79, 1984–89, 1992–97, 2000–01, 2005–06
- 3. Lig: 2001–05
- Amateur Level: 1979–1984

== Players ==
=== Current squad ===
As of 4 October 2026

Note: Flags indicate national team as defined under FIFA eligibility rules; some limited exceptions apply. Players may hold more than one non-FIFA nationality.

No.	Pos.	Nation	Player
1	GK	GRE	Andreas Gianniotis
2	DF	BRA	Cláudio Winck
4	DF	TUN	Adem Arous
5	DF	DEN	Jakob Jessen
7	MF	TUR	Ali Yavuz Kol
8	MF	TUR	Atakan Müjde
9	FW	POL	Adrian Benedyczak
10	MF	BIH	Haris Hajradinović (captain)
11	FW	MLI	Thiemoko Diarra
12	MF	TUN	Mortadha Ben Ouanes
14	DF	FRA	Kévin Mouanga
16	MF	ISL	Andri Baldursson
17	FW	GHA	Jesurun Rak-Sakyi (on loan from Crystal Palace)
18	DF	TUR	Ömer Bayram
19	MF	SWE	Marcus Rafferty
22	DF	TUR	Kamil Çörekçi

No.	Pos.	Nation	Player
23	FW	TUR	Sinan Alkaş
24	DF	TUR	Salih Arıcı
25	GK	TUR	Ali Emre Yanar
26	MF	GER	Kerem Demirbay
27	DF	ROU	Matei Ilie
30	DF	TUR	Ahmet Taha Dağbaşı
34	MF	MLI	Fousseni Diabaté
35	DF	TUR	Sercan Deniz
45	DF	TUR	Ayberk Karapo
50	FW	TUR	Güven Yalçın
51	MF	CPV	Elson Mendes
61	GK	TUR	Ege Albayrak
66	MF	TUR	Emirhan Boz
99	FW	TUR	Muhammed Emin Bektaş
—	DF	NED	Godfried Frimpong
—	FW	TUR	Emirhan Yiğit

=== Out on loan ===
Note: Flags indicate national team as defined under FIFA eligibility rules; some limited exceptions apply. Players may hold more than one non-FIFA nationality.

No.	Pos.	Nation	Player
—	GK	TUR	Ramazan Özkanlı (at Malatya Yeşilyurtspor until 30 June 2027)
—	DF	TUR	Adnan Aktaş (at Aliağa FK until 30 June 2027)
—	DF	TUR	Taylan Aydın (at Ankara Demirspor until 30 June 2027)
—	DF	TUR	Berkay Muratoğlu (at 12 Bingölspor until 30 June 2027)
—	MF	TUR	Dağhan Erdoğan (at Erbaaspor until 30 June 2027)
—	MF	TUR	Burak Gültekin (at Pendikspor until 30 June 2027)

No.	Pos.	Nation	Player
—	FW	TUR	Yusuf Barası (at Eyüpspor until 30 June 2027)
—	FW	TUR	Erdem Çetinkaya (at Ankara Demirspor until 30 June 2027)
—	FW	CIV	Stann Élysée Dalo (at Sarıyer until 30 June 2027)
—	FW	TUR	Yasin Eratilla (at Sakaryaspor until 30 June 2027)
—	FW	SEN	Pape Habib Guèye (at Esenler Erokspor until 30 June 2027)
—	FW	SLO	Kenan Kurtović (at Mura until 30 June 2027)

== Club officials ==
=== Board members ===
Position	Staff
Owner	(Turkey) Kazancı Holding
Chairman	(Turkey) Davut Dişli

=== Coaching staff ===
Position	Name
Head coach	(Turkey) Emre Belözoğlu
Assistant coach	(Turkey) İlker Püren
Assistant coach	(Turkey) Halil Cihan Ünal
Coach	(Turkey) Özgür Öçal
Goalkeeper coach	(Turkey) Özden Öngün
Match and performance analysis coach	(Turkey) Tolga Yalçın
Analysis coach	(Turkey) Furkan Berk Yüksel
Athletic performance coach	(Turkey) Ekrem Özerk Tufan
Athletic performance coach	(Turkey) Sefa Baş
Club doctor	(Turkey) Cem Ergenç

== Coaching history ==
Season(s)	Manager
1922–56	Unknown
1953–56	(Turkey) Eşref Bilgiç
1956–57	(Turkey) Mehmet Reşat Nayır
1957–59	(Turkey) Cihat Arman
1959–60	(Turkey) Recep Adanır (caretaker)
1960	(Turkey) Rebii Erkal
1961	(Turkey) Burhan Sümersan
1961–63	(Italy) Renato Vignolini
1963–64	(Turkey) Esat Kaner
1964	(Italy) Renato Vignolini
1964–72	Unknown
1972	(Turkey) Fehmi Sağınoğlu
1972–88	Unknown
1988–89	(Turkey) Cihat Erbil
1989	(Turkey) Ali Yavaş
1989–92	Unknown
1992–93	(Turkey) Nail Çetin Noyan
1993–94	(Turkey) Ömer Gülen
1994–95	Unknown
1995	(Turkey) Nevruz Şerif
1995–96	(Turkey) İsmail Demiriz
1996–98	(Turkey) Mehmet Şansal
1998–99	(Turkey) Ergun Ortakçı
1999	(Turkey) Mehmet Şansal
1999–00	(Turkey) Nevruz Şerif
2000	(Turkey) Ethem Adlığ
2000–02	Unknown
2002–03	(Turkey) İlhami Şarkan
2003–04	(Turkey) Hasan Vezir
2004–05	Unknown
2005	(Turkey) Akif Başaran
2005	(Turkey) Abdülkerim Durmaz
2005–06	Unknown
2006–07	(Turkey) Akif Başaran
2007	(Turkey) Kadir Özcan
2007	(Turkey) Serdar Dayat (caretaker)

Season(s)	Manager
2007	(Germany) Werner Lorant
2007	(Turkey) Cihat Arslan (caretaker)
2007–09	(Turkey) Uğur Tütüneker
2009	(Turkey) Durmuş
2009–2011	(Turkey) Yılmaz Vural
2011	(Turkey) Fuat Çapa
2011–12	(Turkey) Uğur Tütüneker
2012	(Turkey) Metin Diyadin
2012	(Turkey) Fuat Kılıç (caretaker)
2012–15	(Georgia (country)) Shota Arveladze
2015	(Netherlands) Jan Wouters (caretaker)
2015	(Turkey) Önder Özen
2015–16	(Turkey) Rıza Çalımbay
2016–18	(Turkey) Kemal Özdeş
2018–19	(Turkey) Mustafa Denizli
2019	(Turkey) Öztürk
2019	(Turkey) Kemal Özdeş
2019–20	(Turkey) Tayfur Havutçu
2020	(Turkey) Çoker (caretaker)
2020	(Turkey) Fuat Çapa
2020	(Turkey) Mehmet Altıparmak
2020	(Turkey) Fuat Buz
2020–21	(Turkey) Fuat Çapa
2021	(Turkey) Şenol Can
2021	(Turkey) Cihat Arslan
2021	(Turkey) Hakan Kutlu
2021–22	(Turkey) Sami Uğurlu
2022	(Turkey) Şenol Can
2022–23	(Turkey) Selçuk İnan
2023	(Turkey) Kemal Özdeş
2023–24	(Turkey) Sami Uğurlu
2024–25	(Turkey) Hakan Keleş
2025	(Turkey) Burak Yılmaz
2025	(Georgia (country)) Shota Arveladze
2025-	(Turkey) Emre Belözoğlu

== Presidential history ==
Years	Name
~~No verifiable presidents before the 1990s.~~
c. 1990s	(Turkey) Erdoğan Aslan
1999–2004	(Turkey) Halil Bakırcı
2004–2012	(Turkey) Hasan Hilmi Öksüz
2012–2015	(Turkey) Zafer Yıldırım
2015–2022	(Turkey) Turgay Ciner
2022–2025	(Turkey) Mehmet Fatih Saraç
2025-	(Turkey) Davut Dişli

Note: Reliable records for the club’s early years are scarce; the list begins with the earliest verifiable presidencies.

== Ownership ==
Kasımpaşa S.K. is operated by Kasımpaşa Sportif Faaliyetler A.Ş. (a Turkish joint-stock company, Anonim Şirket), as listed by the Turkish Football Federation.

Control of the club was being held by businessman Turgay Ciner and the Ciner Group since October 2011, until 2025.

The club president (board chair) was Mehmet Fatih Saraç; appointments to the board are made under the articles of Kasımpaşa Sportif Faaliyetler A.Ş., and are published by the club.

In late 2025, Kasımpaşa S.K. was placed under the management of the Savings Deposit Insurance Fund of Turkey (TMSF) following a legal investigation involving the Ciner Group and Can Holding. Following a period of government administration, the club was sold in February 2026. The shares were acquired by Kazancı Holding, led by Cemil Kazancı, which officially concluded the TMSF's management of the club on 4 February 2026.

== See also ==
- List of Turkish Sports Clubs by Foundation Dates
