= 2022–23 Altınordu F.K. season =

Altınordu F.K.
2022–23 season
- Chairman: Seyit Mehmet Özkan
- Manager: Ufuk Kahraman (until 14 December 2022); Gökhan Ünal (from 21 December 2022 to 13 March 2023); Hasan Özer (from 14 March 2023)
- Stadium: Alsancak Mustafa Denizli Stadium
- TFF First League: 16th (relegated)
- Turkish Cup: Fourth round
- Top goalscorer: League: Ahmet İlhan Özek (11); All: Ahmet İlhan Özek (11)

The 2022–23 season was the 100th season in the existence of Altınordu F.K. and the club's ninth consecutive season in the second division of Turkish football. In addition to the domestic league, Altınordu F.K. participated in this season's edition of the Turkish Cup. The season covers the period from 1 July 2022 to 30 June 2023.

== Players ==
=== First-team squad ===
As of 12 January 2023

Note: Flags indicate national team as defined under FIFA eligibility rules; some limited exceptions apply. Players may hold more than one non-FIFA nationality.

No.	Pos.	Nation	Player
1	GK	TUR	Ali Emre Yanar
2	DF	TUR	Volkan Fındıklı
3	DF	TUR	Yusuf Arslan
5	MF	TUR	Kubilay Aktaş
6	MF	TUR	Metehan Yılmaz
7	FW	GER	Şeref Özcan
8	MF	TUR	Muzaffer Kocaer
9	FW	TUR	Ahmet İlhan Özek
10	FW	TUR	Ahmet Dereli
11	FW	TUR	Ali Dere
12	MF	TUR	Emircan Gürlük
14	FW	TUR	Gökberk Efe
15	DF	TUR	Selim Ay (on loan from Çaykur Rizespor)

No.	Pos.	Nation	Player
16	MF	TUR	Emirhan Aydogan
18	DF	TUR	Rıdvan Koçak
21	GK	TUR	Serhat Öztaşdelen
22	DF	TUR	Alperen Selvi
23	MF	NED	Kürşad Sürmeli
26	DF	TUR	Furkan Metin
35	GK	TUR	Mert Bayram
55	DF	TUR	Erdi Dikmen
70	MF	TUR	Metehan Mimaroğlu (on loan from Eyüpspor)
80	MF	TUR	Sami Satılmış
88	DF	TUR	Yusuf Can Esendemir
92	DF	TUR	Rahmi Kaya
99	FW	GER	Ali Özgün

=== Other players under contract ===
Note: Flags indicate national team as defined under FIFA eligibility rules; some limited exceptions apply. Players may hold more than one non-FIFA nationality.

No.	Pos.	Nation	Player
—	DF	TUR	Anıl Doyuran

=== Out on loan ===
Note: Flags indicate national team as defined under FIFA eligibility rules; some limited exceptions apply. Players may hold more than one non-FIFA nationality.

No.	Pos.	Nation	Player
—	GK	TUR	Mertcan Dağlı (at Karaman FK until 30 June 2023)
—	GK	TUR	Emirhan Emir (at Efeler 09 SFK until 30 June 2023)
—	DF	TUR	Tuncay Çağman (at Nazilli Belediyespor until 30 June 2023)
—	DF	TUR	Aykut Çolakoğlu (at Karşıyaka until 30 June 2023)
—	DF	TUR	Enes Yetim (at Darıca Gençlerbirliği until 30 June 2023)
—	MF	TUR	Atalay Gürel (at Menemenspor until 30 June 2023)
—	MF	TUR	Mustafa Kaya (at Modafen until 30 June 2023)

No.	Pos.	Nation	Player
—	MF	TUR	Tayfun Tatlı (at Gümüşhanespor until 30 June 2023)
—	FW	TUR	Polat Abay (at Karşıyaka until 30 June 2023)
—	FW	TUR	Anıl Arıcıoğlu (at Nazilli Belediyespor until 30 June 2023)
—	FW	TUR	Berkcan Cengiz (at Efeler 09 SFK until 30 June 2023)
—	FW	TUR	Kenan Fakılı (at Somaspor until 30 June 2023)
—	FW	TUR	Altar Han Hidayetoğlu (at Düzcespor until 30 June 2023)

== Pre-season and friendlies ==
Win Draw Loss Fixtures

== Competitions ==
=== Overall record ===
Competition	First match	Last match	Starting round	Final position	Record							
Competition	First match	Last match	Starting round	Final position	Pld	W	D	L	GF	GA	GD	Win %
TFF First League	12 August 2022	21 May 2023	Matchday 1	16th	36	9	8	19	41	57	−16	25.00
Turkish Cup	19 October 2022	9 November 2022	Third round	Fourth round	2	1	0	1	5	1	+4	50.00
Total					38	10	8	20	46	58	−12	26.32

Source: Soccerway

=== TFF First League ===
==== League table ====
Pos	Team	Pld	W	D	L	GF	GA	GD	Pts	Qualification or relegation
14	Tuzlaspor	36	11	5	20	42	52	−10	38 (Note: Head-to-head points: Gençlerbirliği 1–2 Tuzlaspor, Tuzlaspor 1–0 Gençlerbirliği)	
15	Gençlerbirliği	36	10	8	18	46	55	−9	38	
16	Altınordu (R)	36	9	8	19	41	57	−16	35	Relegation to the TFF Second League
17	Adanaspor (Note: Adanaspor withdrew from the league following the 2023 Turkey–Syria earthquake and were not relegated at the end of the season.)	36	6	7	23	32	76	−44	25	Withdrew
18	Denizlispor (Note: Denizlispor have been deducted 3 points by the Club Licensing Board for failing to meet the licensing requirements.) (R)	36	7	5	24	35	67	−32	23	Relegation to the TFF Second League

Source: TFF
Rules for classification: 1) Points; 2) Head-to-head points; 3) Head-to-head goal difference; 4) Head-to-head goals scored; 5) Goal difference; 6) Goals scored
(R) Relegated

==== Results summary ====
Overall								Home						Away					
Pld	W	D	L	GF	GA	GD	Pts	W	D	L	GF	GA	GD	W	D	L	GF	GA	GD
36	9	8	19	41	57	−16	35	5	4	9	22	30	−8	4	4	10	19	27	−8

Source: Spor Toto 1. Lig

==== Results by round ====
Round	1	2	3	4	5	6	7	8	9	10	11	12	13	14	15	16	17	18	19	20	21	22	23	24	25	26	27	28	29	30	31	32	33	34	35	36	37	38
Ground	A	H	A		H	A	H	A	H	A	H	A	H	A	H	A	H	A	H	H	A	H		A	H	A	H	A	H	A	H	A	H	A	H	A	H	A
Result	D	L	D	B	D	L	L	W	W	W	L	L	L	L	L	L	L	L	D	W	L	D	B	L	L	L	W	L	W	W	L	W	W	D	D	L	L	D
Position	6	14	15	16	16	16	17	16	13	12	13	15	16	16	16	16	17	17	18	16	16	16	16	16	18	18	16	16⁣	16⁣	15	15	15	14	15	14	15	16	16

Source: Spor Toto 1. Lig
A = Away; H = Home; B = Bye; W = Win; D = Draw; L = Loss

==== Matches ====
The league schedule was released on 5 July.

13 August 2022 1	Gençlerbirliği	3–3	Altınordu	Ankara
21:45 TRT (UTC+3)	Alıcı 12'; Karakaş 28'; Gül (penalty missed) 40'; Aktaş 44'	Report	Özek 6' (pen.), 17'; Özcan (yellow card) 37'; Kınalı 45'	Stadium: Eryaman Stadium; Attendance: 1,777; Referee: Can Cengiz

20 August 2022 2	Altınordu	0–2	Sakaryaspor	İzmir
21:45 TRT (UTC+3)	Dikmen (yellow card) 82'	Report	Taşçı 36'; Kasongo 38', (yellow card) 56'; Aydoğan (yellow card) 84'	Stadium: Bornova Aziz Kocaoğlu Stadium; Attendance: 670; Referee: Oğuzhan Çakır

27 August 2022 3	Boluspor	1–1	Altınordu	Bolu
21:45 TRT (UTC+3)	Bilgiç 36'; Karadeniz (yellow card) 74'; Baldé (penalty missed) 77'; Bregu (penalty missed) 90'	Report	Koçak (yellow card) 83'; Özek 85' (pen.) (penalty missed) 90+7'; Aktaş (yellow card) 90'	Stadium: Bolu Atatürk Stadium; Referee: Furkan Aksuoğlu

4	Bye

12 September 2022 5	Altınordu	1–1	Pendikspor	İzmir
20:00 TRT (UTC+3)	Dereli 45+3'; Yılmaz (yellow card) 84'	Report	Kappel 24'; Akarslan (yellow card) 41'; Regattin (yellow card) 65'	Stadium: Bornova Aziz Kocaoğlu Stadium; Referee: Adnan Deniz Kayatepe

18 September 2022 6	Göztepe	1–0	Altınordu	İzmir
19:00 TRT (UTC+3)	Öztekin (yellow card) 41' (goal) 82' (pen.)	Report	Sürmeli (red card) 47'; Özek (yellow card) 81'; Dikmen (yellow card) 90+5'	Stadium: Gürsel Aksel Stadium; Referee: Muhammet Ali Metoğlu

2 October 2022 7	Altınordu	1–4	Ankara Keçiörengücü	İzmir
19:00 TRT (UTC+3)	Fındıklı 6'; Kaya (yellow card) 45'	Report	Gür 16'; Okyar 36'; Karadeniz 45+1' (pen.); Camara 55'; Demir (yellow card) 65'; Bardhi (yellow card) 80'	Stadium: Bornova Aziz Kocaoğlu Stadium; Referee: Murat Erdoğan

9 October 2022 8	Tuzlaspor	0–1	Altınordu	Istanbul
13:30 TRT (UTC+3)	Cisse (yellow card) 14'; Can (yellow card) 29' (yellow-red card) 31'	Report	Aktaş (yellow card) 10'; Özek 63'; Satılmış (yellow card) 90+2'	Stadium: Tuzla Belediye Sahası; Referee: Caner Ak

15 October 2022 9	Altınordu	2–1	Samsunspor	İzmir
19:00 TRT (UTC+3)	Koçak (yellow card) 45+2'; Aktaş 53'; Özek 59' (pen.); Metin (yellow card) 85'; Yılmaz (yellow card) 90+1'	Report	Tanque (red card) 9'; Yüksel (yellow card) 13'; Çift (yellow card) 45+2'; Sağat 90+2'; Öztürk (yellow card)	Stadium: Bornova Aziz Kocaoğlu Stadium; Referee: Tarık Güldal

22 October 2022 10	Denizlispor	1–2	Altınordu	Denizli
19:00 TRT (UTC+3)	Sağlık (yellow card) 19'; Böke 88'; Çinemre (yellow card) 90+5'	Report	Esendemir (yellow card) 11'; Özek 35' (pen.), 67'; Sürmeli (yellow card) 38'; Koçak (yellow card) 90+4'	Stadium: Denizli Atatürk Stadium; Referee: Oğuzhan Aksu

28 October 2022 11	Altınordu	0–3	Yeni Malatyaspor	İzmir
20:00 TRT (UTC+3)		Report	Emeksiz 48' (yellow card) 72'; Osman 66'; Çağıran 74'; Ulaş (yellow card) 83'; Ekici (yellow card) 90'	Stadium: Bornova Aziz Kocaoğlu Stadium; Referee: Onur Özütoprak

6 November 2022 12	Eyüpspor	2–1	Altınordu	Istanbul
19:00 TRT (UTC+3)	Öztürk 25', (yellow card) 86'; Ildız 58'	Report	Yılmaz (yellow card) 44'; Koçak (yellow card) 83'; Özek (penalty missed) 89', 89'	Stadium: Eyüp Stadium; Referee: Burak Pakkan

13 November 2022 13	Altınordu	0–2	Altay	İzmir
16:00 TRT (UTC+3)	Sürmeli (yellow card) 29'; Kaya (yellow card) 64'	Report	Gülselam (red card) 18'; Uluç (yellow card) 21'; Öztürk 65'; Paixão 69' (pen.); Özenç (yellow card) 90+1'	Stadium: Bornova Aziz Kocaoğlu Stadium; Referee: Can Cengiz

19 November 2022 14	Adanaspor	2–1	Altınordu	Adana
16:00 TRT (UTC+3)	Çoban 31'; Roche (yellow card) 43'; Akınay (yellow card) 68'; Türker (yellow card) 84'; Iseka 90+4'	Report	Özek 44' (pen.); Aktaş (yellow card) 56'; Esendemir (yellow card) 71'; Efe (yellow card) 90'	Stadium: New Adana Stadium; Referee: Abdullah Buğra Taşkınsoy

28 November 2022 15	Altınordu	1–3	Manisa	İzmir
20:00 TRT (UTC+3)	Aktaş (yellow card) 40'; Dikmen (yellow card) 75'; Gürlük (yellow card) 79'; Dere 90+2'	Report	Kör 26', 73'; Prib (yellow card) 57'; Ilgaz 66'; Diallo (yellow card) 90'	Stadium: Bornova Aziz Kocaoğlu Stadium; Referee: Ömer Faruk Turtay

3 December 2022 16	Bandırmaspor	1–0	Altınordu	Balıkesir
13:30 TRT (UTC+3)	Çiçek 27'; Kuruçuk (yellow card) 41'; Avcı (yellow card) 69'	Report	Arslan (yellow card) 58'; Yöntem (yellow card) 78'	Stadium: Bandırma 17 Eylül Stadium; Referee: Alper Akarsu

11 December 2022 17	Altınordu	0–2	Bodrumspor	İzmir
19:00 TRT (UTC+3)	Fındıklı (yellow card) 29'; Koçak (yellow card) 38'	Report	Ergün 8'; Dumanlı 12'; Çetinkaya (yellow card) 55'; Diogo Sousa (yellow card) 87'	Stadium: Bornova Aziz Kocaoğlu Stadium; Referee: Burak Pakkan

18 December 2022 18	Erzurumspor	2–1	Altınordu	Erzurum
13:30 TRT (UTC+3)	Özhan 44'; Bayrak (yellow card) 54'; Tozlu 72'	Report	Özcan 31', (yellow card) 82'; Koçak (yellow card) 45+1'	Stadium: Kazım Karabekir Stadium; Referee: Murat Erdoğan

26 December 2022 19	Altınordu	0–0	Çaykur Rizespor	İzmir
17:00 TRT (UTC+3)	Acar (yellow card) 4'; Yılmaz (yellow card) 42'; Aktaş (yellow card) 57'	Report	Potuk (yellow card) 28'	Stadium: Bornova Aziz Kocaoğlu Stadium; Referee: Ramazan Keleş

15 January 2023 20	Altınordu	2–1	Gençlerbirliği	İzmir
19:00 TRT (UTC+3)	Özgün 50'; Gürlük 66'; Aktaş (yellow card) 71'	Report	Torje 23'; Rodrigues (yellow card) 34'; Keskin (yellow card) 71'	Stadium: Bornova Aziz Kocaoğlu Stadium; Referee: Abdullah Buğra Taşkınsoy

20 January 2023 21	Sakaryaspor	2–1	Altınordu	Sakarya
20:00 TRT (UTC+3)	Süleyman 3', 24'; Tut (yellow card) 68'; Roshi (yellow card) 87'	Report	Gürlük 5'; Gökçe (yellow card) 10'; Aktaş (yellow card) 26'; Koçak (yellow card) 84'	Stadium: New Sakarya Atatürk Stadium; Referee: Mehmet Ali Özer

28 January 2023 22	Altınordu	1–1	Boluspor	İzmir
16:00 TRT (UTC+3)	Özek 90+2' (pen.) (yellow card) 90+4'	Report	Cevahir (yellow card) 5'; Ataseven (yellow card) 9'; Ulaş (yellow card) 50'; Ndlovu 58'; Okutan (yellow card) 89'; Kacar (yellow card) 90+5'	Stadium: Bornova Aziz Kocaoğlu Stadium; Referee: Alper Akarsu

23	Bye

3 March 2023 24	Pendikspor	2–1	Altınordu	Istanbul
20:00 TRT (UTC+3)	Ildız 61'; Thuram (yellow card) 85'; Tunçer 87'	Report	Özgün (yellow card) 10'; Ay (yellow card) 45+2'	Stadium: Pendik Stadium; Referee: Alpaslan Şen

7 March 2023 25	Altınordu	0–1	Göztepe	İzmir
20:00 TRT (UTC+3)	Aydoğan (yellow card) 33'; Gürlük (yellow card) 45'	Report	Ngalina 23'; Çiftçi (yellow card) 84'; Arslanagić (yellow card) 84'; Köybaşı (yellow card) 90+2'	Stadium: Bornova Aziz Kocaoğlu Stadium; Referee: Adnan Deniz Kayatepe

12 March 2023 26	Ankara Keçiörengücü	4–0	Altınordu	Ankara
13:30 TRT (UTC+3)	Karadeniz 12'; Dembélé 59'; Mallé 61'; Anderson 90+2'	Report	Özek (yellow card) 13'; Arslan (yellow card) 34'; Gökçe (red card) 77'; Sürmeli (yellow card) 93'	Stadium: Aktepe Stadium; Referee: İlker Yasin Avcı

17 March 2023 27	Altınordu	2–1	Tuzlaspor	İzmir
20:00 TRT (UTC+3)	Yılmaz (yellow card) 69'; Özgün 83'; Gürlük 89'	Report	Alıcı 32' (o.g.); Imbula (yellow card) 45+4'; Artan (yellow card) 90'; Awuku 90+6'	Stadium: Bornova Aziz Kocaoğlu Stadium; Referee: Ömer Faruk Turtay

24 March 2023 28	Samsunspor	2–0	Altınordu	Samsun
20:00 TRT (UTC+3)	Tanque 68' (pen.); Aydoğdu 89'	Report	Yılmaz (yellow card) 45'; Dikmen (yellow card) 66'; Aydoğan (yellow card) 90+5'	Stadium: Samsun Stadium; Referee: Arda Kardeşler

28 March 2023 29	Altınordu	5–2	Denizlispor	İzmir
17:00 TRT (UTC+3)	Sürmeli 12'; Özgün 16', 65', 70'; Yener (yellow card) 83', (goal) 90'	Report	Şişmanoğlu 5'; Derici 43', (yellow card) 87'; Çinemre (yellow card) 79'	Stadium: Bornova Aziz Kocaoğlu Stadium; Referee: Volkan Bayarslan

30	Yeni Malatyaspor	0–3 (w/o)	Altınordu	Malatya
		Report		Stadium: New Malatya Stadium

8 April 2023 31	Altınordu	1–2	Eyüpspor	İzmir
20:30 TRT (UTC+3)	Selvi (yellow card) 29'; Aydoğan (yellow card) 61'; Mimaroğlu 77'	Report	Bayram (yellow card) 21'; Demirok 29' (pen.); Alkılıç 54'	Stadium: Bornova Aziz Kocaoğlu Stadium; Referee: Murat Erdoğan

13 April 2023 32	Altay	1–2	Altınordu	İzmir
20:30 TRT (UTC+3)	Yıldırım (red card) 48'; Naderi 54'; Sarıkaya (yellow card) 62'	Report	Alıcı (yellow card) 14'; Sürmeli (yellow card) 40'; Aktaş (yellow card) 45+9'; Gürlük 46'; Aydoğan (yellow card) 48'; Özgün 90+8'	Stadium: Alsancak Mustafa Denizli Stadium; Referee: Kutluhan Bilgiç

33	Altınordu	3–0 (w/o)	Adanaspor	İzmir
		Report		Stadium: Bornova Aziz Kocaoğlu Stadium

24 April 2023 34	Manisa	2–2	Altınordu	Manisa
16:00 TRT (UTC+3)	Şahin 59'; Prib (yellow card) 60'; Gakpa 68' (pen.), (yellow card) 71'	Report		Stadium: Mümin Özkasap Stadium; Referee: Gürcan Hasova

30 April 2023 35	Altınordu	3–3	Bandırmaspor	İzmir
16:00 TRT (UTC+3)	Aydın (yellow card) 45+7'; Fındıklı 80'; Özek 85' (pen.); Özgün 90+6', (yellow card) 90+6'	Report	Özcan (yellow card) 23'; Terzić (yellow card) 37'; Šaponjić 50', 64', 75'; Kaplan (yellow card) 90+4'	Stadium: Bornova Aziz Kocaoğlu Stadium; Referee: Ali Palabıyık

7 May 2023 36	Bodrumspor	1–0	Altınordu	Muğla
16:00 TRT (UTC+3)	Özer 79' (pen.); Bayrakdar (yellow card) 90+4'	Report	Sürmeli (yellow card) 74'; Gürlük (yellow card) 89'	Stadium: Bodrum İlçe Stadium; Referee: Ümit Öztürk

16 May 2023 37	Altınordu	0–1	Erzurumspor	İzmir
17:00 TRT (UTC+3)	Sürmeli (yellow card) 47'	Report	Yumlu 16'; Rosheuvel (yellow card) 47'; Bakırbaş (yellow card) 57'; Hanalp (yellow card) 90+9'	Stadium: Bornova Aziz Kocaoğlu Stadium; Referee: Mete Kalkavan

21 May 2023 38	Çaykur Rizespor	0–0	Altınordu	Rize
16:00 TRT (UTC+3)	Ceylan (yellow card) 37'; Koç (yellow card) 45+4'; Potuk (yellow card) 51'; Keser (yellow card) 56'; Topçu (yellow card) 90'	Report	Yener (yellow card) 24'; Sürmeli (red card) 31'; Özek (yellow card) 32'; Selvi (yellow card) 35'; Ay (yellow card) 45+5'; Alıcı (yellow card) 56'	Stadium: Çaykur Didi Stadium; Referee: Zorbay Küçük

=== Turkish Cup ===
19 October 2022 Third round	Altınordu	5–0	Sapanca Gençlikspor	İzmir
14:00 TRT (UTC+3)	Selvi (yellow card) 33'; Efe 38', 54'; Kocaer 52', 65'; Talga 68'	Report		Stadium: Tire Gazi Mustafa Kemal Atatürk Stadium; Referee: Erdem Mertoğlu

9 November 2022 Fourth round	Altınordu	0–1 (a.e.t.)	Bodrumspor	İzmir
14:00 TRT (UTC+3)		Report	Çetinkaya (yellow card) 73'; Çayır 107'; Alpsoy 111'	Stadium: Tire Gazi Mustafa Kemal Atatürk Stadium; Referee: Ozan Ergün
