= 2022–23 Adanaspor season =

Adanaspor
2022–23 season
- Chairman: Bayram Akgül
- Manager: Mustafa Kaplan (until 12 September 2022); Önder Karaveli (from 27 September 2022 to 11 November 2022); Eyüp Arın (caretaker, from 11 November 2022 to 20 December 2022); Kemal Kılıç (from 21 December 2022 to 21 February 2023)
- Stadium: New Adana Stadium
- TFF First League: 17th (withdrew)
- Turkish Cup: Fourth round
- Top goalscorer: League: Samuel Tetteh, Ahmethan Köse (6 goals each); All: Samuel Tetteh, Ahmethan Köse (6 goals each)

The 2022–23 season was the 69th season in the existence of Adanaspor and the club's sixth consecutive season in the second division of Turkish football. In addition to the domestic league, Adanaspor participated in this season's edition of the Turkish Cup. The season covers the period from 1 July 2022 to 30 June 2023.

== Players ==
=== First-team squad ===
As of 20 January 2023

Note: Flags indicate national team as defined under FIFA eligibility rules; some limited exceptions apply. Players may hold more than one non-FIFA nationality.

No.	Pos.	Nation	Player
1	GK	TUR	Hasan Hüseyin Akınay
5	DF	TUR	Yiğithan Güveli
6	MF	MAR	Youssef Aït Bennasser
7	FW	TUR	Metehan Altunbaş
8	MF	GER	Berkan Fırat
9	FW	TUR	Ahmethan Köse
10	FW	GHA	Samuel Tetteh
11	MF	POR	Pedro Nuno
14	MF	TUR	Hakki Türker
17	FW	GER	Burak Çoban
18	DF	TUR	Hüseyin Öztürk
19	FW	BFA	Adolphe Belem
20	FW	BEL	Aaron Leya Iseka (on loan from Barnsley)
21	DF	GER	Miran Ağırbaş
22	DF	TUR	Harun Kaya
23	DF	TUR	Evren Korkmaz

No.	Pos.	Nation	Player
28	MF	TUR	Özcan Aydın
29	GK	TUR	Özer Soylu
30	FW	GAM	Lamin Jallow
33	DF	TUR	Berkan Güner
39	GK	TUR	Ahmet Kivanç
53	DF	TUR	Burak Çamoğlu
59	GK	TUR	Arda Akbulut (on loan from Trabzonspor)
61	MF	BEL	Enes Sağlık
69	DF	BEN	Yohan Roche
75	MF	TUR	Emre Kaplan (on loan from Başakşehir)
77	DF	TUR	Ferhat Katipoğlu
80	MF	TUR	Sefa Etöz
90	MF	TUR	Metehan Mollaoğlu
91	FW	MLI	Hadi Sacko
94	MF	TUR	İbrahim Aksu

=== Out on loan ===
Note: Flags indicate national team as defined under FIFA eligibility rules; some limited exceptions apply. Players may hold more than one non-FIFA nationality.

No. / Pos. / Nation / Player; — / MF / TUR / Mutlu Aksu Doğan (at Tarsus IY until 30 June 2023)	No. / Pos. / Nation / Player; — / MF / TUR / Mehmet Emin Sipahi (at Kepez Belediyespor until 30 June 2023)

== Pre-season and friendlies ==
Win Draw Loss Fixtures

== Competitions ==
=== Overall record ===
Competition	First match	Last match	Starting round	Final position	Record							
Competition	First match	Last match	Starting round	Final position	Pld	W	D	L	GF	GA	GD	Win %
TFF First League	15 August 2022	21 May 2023	Matchday 1	17th (withdrew)	36	6	7	23	32	76	−44	16.67
Turkish Cup	19 October 2022	9 November 2022	Third round	Fourth round	2	1	0	1	1	4	−3	50.00
Total					38	7	7	24	33	80	−47	18.42

Source: Soccerway

=== TFF First League ===
==== League table ====
Pos	Team	Pld	W	D	L	GF	GA	GD	Pts	Qualification or relegation
15	Gençlerbirliği	36	10	8	18	46	55	−9	38 (Note: Head-to-head points: Gençlerbirliği 1–2 Tuzlaspor, Tuzlaspor 1–0 Gençlerbirliği)	
16	Altınordu (R)	36	9	8	19	41	57	−16	35	Relegation to the TFF Second League
17	Adanaspor (Note: Adanaspor withdrew from the league following the 2023 Turkey–Syria earthquake and were not relegated at the end of the season.)	36	6	7	23	32	76	−44	25	Withdrew
18	Denizlispor (Note: Denizlispor have been deducted 3 points by the Club Licensing Board for failing to meet the licensing requirements.) (R)	36	7	5	24	35	67	−32	23	Relegation to the TFF Second League
19	Yeni Malatyaspor (Note: Yeni Malatyaspor have been deducted 3 points by the Club Licensing Board for failing to meet the licensing requirements. Yeni Malatyaspor withdrew from the league following the 2023 Turkey–Syria earthquake and were not relegated at the end of the season.)	36	4	7	25	22	81	−59	16	Withdrew

Source: TFF
Rules for classification: 1) Points; 2) Head-to-head points; 3) Head-to-head goal difference; 4) Head-to-head goals scored; 5) Goal difference; 6) Goals scored
(R) Relegated

==== Results summary ====
Overall								Home						Away					
Pld	W	D	L	GF	GA	GD	Pts	W	D	L	GF	GA	GD	W	D	L	GF	GA	GD
36	6	7	23	32	76	−44	25	4	5	9	19	37	−18	2	2	14	13	39	−26

Source: Spor Toto 1. Lig

==== Results by round ====
Round	1	2	3	4	5	6	7	8	9	10	11	12	13	14	15	16	17	18	19	20	21	22	23	24	25	26	27	28	29	30	31	32	33	34	35	36	37	38
Ground	H	A	A	H	A	H	A	H	A	H	A	H	A	H		H	A	H	A	A	H	H	A	H	A	H	A	H	A	H	A	H	A		A	H	A	H
Result	D	D	D	D	L	W	L	D	L	W	L	W	L	W	B	D	L	L	L	W	D	L	W	L	L	L	L	L	L	L	L	L	L	B	L	L	L	L
Position	8	10	11	13	14	12	13	13	14	13	14	11	13	12	12	12	13	14	15	12	12	12	12	12	12	14	14	15	15	16⁣	16⁣	17⁣	17⁣	17⁣	17⁣	17⁣	17⁣	17

Source: Spor Toto 1. Lig
A = Away; H = Home; B = Bye; W = Win; D = Draw; L = Loss

==== Matches ====
The league schedule was released on 5 July.

15 August 2022 1	Adanaspor	1–1	Tuzlaspor	Adana
19:00 TRT (UTC+3)	Tetteh 30'; Güveli (yellow card) 70'; Sacko (yellow card) 89'	Report	Akkan (yellow card) 38'; Mata 45+1'	Stadium: New Adana Stadium; Attendance: 893; Referee: Emre Kargın

21 August 2022 2	Yeni Malatyaspor	1–1	Adanaspor	Malatya
19:15 TRT (UTC+3)	Emeksiz 55'; Mallé (yellow card) 76'	Report	Tetteh 32'; Sacko (yellow card) 88'; Etöz (yellow card) 90+3'; Bennasser (yellow card) 90+4'	Stadium: New Malatya Stadium; Attendance: 1,577; Referee: Murat Erdoğan

28 August 2022 3	Bodrumspor	3–3	Adanaspor	Muğla
17:00 TRT (UTC+3)	Kaplan 6' (o.g.); Dumanlı 69'; Aktaş 90+1'; Mohammed (yellow card) 90+3'	Report	Jallow (yellow card) 19' (goal) 45+3', 90+5'; Kaplan (yellow card) 45+2'; Sacko 67'; Çamoğlu (yellow card) 90'	Stadium: Bodrum İlçe Stadium; Referee: Adnan Deniz Kayatepe

4 September 2022 4	Adanaspor	1–1	Altay	Adana
20:00 TRT (UTC+3)	Türker 28'; Korkmaz (yellow card) 87'; Jallow (yellow card) 90+3'	Report	Öztürk 14'; Björkander (yellow card) 30'; Gülselam (yellow card) 90+4'	Stadium: New Adana Stadium; Referee: Can Cengiz

11 September 2022 5	Eyüpspor	1–0	Adanaspor	Istanbul
20:00 TRT (UTC+3)	Demirok (yellow card) 11', (goal) 11' (pen.); Ezeh (red card) 79'	Report	Jallow (yellow card) 11'; Türker (yellow card) 38'; Katipoğlu (yellow card) 45+3'	Stadium: Eyüp Stadium; Referee: Ramazan Keleş

17 September 2022 6	Adanaspor	2–0	Çaykur Rizespor	Adana
19:00 TRT (UTC+3)	Çoban 16'; Korkmaz 58'	Report		Stadium: New Adana Stadium; Referee: Onur Özütoprak

2 October 2022 7	Manisa	3–2	Adanaspor	Manisa
13:30 TRT (UTC+3)	Büyük 39' (yellow card) 90+7'; Gakpa 45+5' (pen.); Karapo 56'; Domgjoni (red card) 74'; Diallo (yellow card) 81'; Uysal (yellow card) 90+2'; Şahin (yellow card) 90+4'	Report	Köse 27', 78' (pen.), (yellow card) 47'; Korkmaz (yellow card) 45+4'; Roche (yellow card) 90+7'	Stadium: Mümin Özkasap Stadium; Referee: Mehmet Türkmen

7 October 2022 8	Adanaspor	1–1	Bandırmaspor	Adana
20:00 TRT (UTC+3)	Aksu (yellow card) 16'; Yeşil 53' (pen.) (yellow card) 55'; Çamoğlu (yellow card) 59'; Tetteh (yellow card) 67'	Report	Mulumba (yellow card) 4'; Avcı 47', (yellow card) 61'; Keskin (yellow card) 51'; Saymak (yellow card) 89'	Stadium: New Adana Stadium; Referee: Ozan Ergün

16 October 2022 9	Sakaryaspor	3–2	Adanaspor	Sakarya
19:00 TRT (UTC+3)	Kasongo 42'; Aydoğan 67'; Roshi (yellow card) 70'; Donkor 81'; Taşcı (yellow card) 90'	Report	Kotoko 7', 27'; Kaplan (yellow card) 80'	Stadium: New Sakarya Atatürk Stadium; Referee: Eren Özyemişcioğlu

24 October 2022 10	Adanaspor	2–1	Gençlerbirliği	Adana
20:00 TRT (UTC+3)	Bennasser 34' (pen.); Köse 77'	Report	Alıcı 42'; Mert (yellow card) 45+2'; Kahya (yellow card) 52'	Stadium: New Adana Stadium; Referee: Adem Cinek

30 October 2022 11	Boluspor	1–0	Adanaspor	Bolu
19:00 TRT (UTC+3)	Kacar (yellow card) 29'; Oularé 66'	Report	Kaplan (yellow card) 52'; Çoban (yellow card) 90+3'	Stadium: Bolu Atatürk Stadium; Referee: Alper Akarsu

5 November 2022 12	Adanaspor	3–2	Pendikspor	Adana
16:00 TRT (UTC+3)	Jallow 11', (yellow card) 35'; Çoban 24'; Roche 40' (yellow card) 63'; Bennasser (yellow card) 45+5'; Türker (yellow card) 53'; Öztürk (yellow card) 58'; Korkmaz (yellow card) 79'	Report	Thuram (yellow card) 28', (goal) 32'; Kappel 42'; Kaya (yellow card) 67'; Akça (yellow card) 88'	Stadium: New Adana Stadium; Referee: Yiğit Arslan

12 November 2022 13	Erzurumspor	3–2	Adanaspor	Erzurum
16:00 TRT (UTC+3)	Olanare (yellow card) 38'; Estrela (yellow card) 43'; Artarslan (yellow card) 48'; Hašek (yellow card) 64'; Yumlu 65'; Ovacıklı 82'; Tozlu 90'; Akgün (yellow card)	Report	Yeşil (yellow card) 43'; Tetteh 62'; Çoban 90+1', (yellow card)	Stadium: Kazım Karabekir Stadium; Referee: Ömer Faruk Turtay

19 November 2022 14	Adanaspor	2–1	Altınordu	Adana
16:00 TRT (UTC+3)	Çoban 31'; Roche (yellow card) 43'; Akınay (yellow card) 68'; Türker (yellow card) 84'; Iseka 90+4'	Report	Özek 44' (pen.); Aktaş (yellow card) 56'; Esendemir (yellow card) 71'; Efe (yellow card) 90'	Stadium: New Adana Stadium; Referee: Abdullah Buğra Taşkınsoy

15	Bye

4 December 2022 16	Adanaspor	2–2	Göztepe	Adana
16:00 TRT (UTC+3)	Nuno 4'; Köse 71'	Report	Öztekin 15'; Palmer 83'	Stadium: New Adana Stadium; Referee: Sarper Barış Saka

10 December 2022 17	Ankara Keçiörengücü	1–0	Adanaspor	Ankara
13:30 TRT (UTC+3)	Kartal (yellow card) 37'; Sarman (yellow card) 45+2'; Reşmen 57'	Report	Iseka (yellow card) 37'; Bennasser (penalty missed) 38'; Güveli (yellow card) 76'; Roche (yellow card) 86'	Stadium: Aktepe Stadium; Referee: Reşat Onur Coşkunses

19 December 2022 18	Adanaspor	2–3	Denizlispor	Adana
20:00 TRT (UTC+3)	Türker 19' (yellow card) 65'; Sacko 37'; Güveli (yellow card) 67'; Köse (yellow card) 90+1'; Katipoğlu (yellow card) 90+2'	Report	Yılmaz 3'; Şişmanoğlu 17'; Mayi 38'; Djédjé (yellow card) 45'; Sağlık (yellow card) 89'	Stadium: New Adana Stadium; Referee: Can Cengiz

25 December 2022 19	Samsunspor	2–1	Adanaspor	Samsun
19:00 TRT (UTC+3)	Laura 11', (yellow card) 90+4'; Kahraman 74'	Report	Nuno (yellow card) 61'; Etöz (yellow card) 67'; Jallow (yellow card) 67'; Köse 90+8'	Stadium: Samsun Stadium; Referee: Adnan Deniz Kayatepe

15 January 2023 20	Tuzlaspor	0–1	Adanaspor	Istanbul
13:30 TRT (UTC+3)	Imbula (yellow card) 66'; Koyuncu (yellow card) 85'; Bayrak (yellow card) 90+6'	Report	Iseka 27'; Köse (yellow card) 66'; Etöz (yellow card) 76'	Stadium: Sancaktepe Stadium; Referee: Oğuzhan Çakır

22 January 2023 21	Adanaspor	2–2	Yeni Malatyaspor	Adana
19:00 TRT (UTC+3)	Tetteh 32'; Köse 48'; Türker (yellow card) 70'; Korkmaz (yellow card) 83'; Coban (yellow card) 90+3'; Kıvanç (yellow card) 90+6'	Report	Yaşa (yellow card) 8'; Akgün (penalty missed) 15'; Aydin 56', (yellow card) 83'; Şengül (yellow card) 90+3'; Emeksiz 90+10'	Stadium: New Adana Stadium; Referee: Fatih Tokail

29 January 2023 22	Adanaspor	1–2	Bodrumspor	Adana
13:30 TRT (UTC+3)	Güveli (yellow card) 37'; Jallow 61'	Report	Özer 20' (pen.); Özdamar (yellow card) 25'; Yalçın (yellow card) 37'; Umar 90'	Stadium: New Adana Stadium; Referee: Feridun Daldaş

3 February 2023 23	Altay	0–1	Adanaspor	İzmir
20:00 TRT (UTC+3)	Sarıkaya (yellow card) 31'; Özenç (yellow card) 90+2'	Report	Korkmaz (yellow card) 90+2'; Sacko 90+3' (pen.)	Stadium: Alsancak Mustafa Denizli Stadium; Referee: Erdem Mertoğlu

24	Adanaspor	0–3 (w/o)	Eyüpspor	Adana
		Report		Stadium: New Adana Stadium

25	Çaykur Rizespor	3–0 (w/o)	Adanaspor	Rize
		Report		Stadium: Çaykur Didi Stadium

26	Adanaspor	0–3 (w/o)	Manisa	Adana
		Report		Stadium: New Adana Stadium

27	Bandırmaspor	3–0 (w/o)	Adanaspor	Balıkesir
		Report		Stadium: Bandırma 17 Eylül Stadium

28	Adanaspor	0–3 (w/o)	Sakaryaspor	Adana
		Report		Stadium: New Adana Stadium

29	Gençlerbirliği	3–0 (w/o)	Adanaspor	Ankara
		Report		Stadium: Eryaman Stadium

30	Adanaspor	0–3 (w/o)	Boluspor	Adana
		Report		Stadium: New Adana Stadium

31	Pendikspor	3–0 (w/o)	Adanaspor	Istanbul
		Report		Stadium: Pendik Stadium

32	Adanaspor	0–3 (w/o)	Erzurumspor	Adana
		Report		Stadium: New Adana Stadium

33	Altınordu	3–0 (w/o)	Adanaspor	İzmir
		Report		Stadium: Bornova Aziz Kocaoğlu Stadium

34	Bye

35	Göztepe	3–0 (w/o)	Adanaspor	İzmir
		Report		Stadium: Gürsel Aksel Stadium

36	Adanaspor	0–3 (w/o)	Ankara Keçiörengücü	Adana
		Report		Stadium: New Adana Stadium

37	Denizlispor	3–0 (w/o)	Adanaspor	Denizli
		Report		Stadium: Denizli Atatürk Stadium

38	Adanaspor	0–3 (w/o)	Samsunspor	Adana
		Report		Stadium: New Adana Stadium

=== Turkish Cup ===
19 October 2022 Third round	Adanaspor	1–0	Orduspor 1967	Adana
14:00 TRT (UTC+3)	Türker 90+3'	Report	Gençel (yellow card) 16'; Keskin (yellow card) 29'	Stadium: New Adana Stadium; Referee: Yunus Dursun

9 November 2022 Fourth round	Samsunspor	4–0	Adanaspor	Samsun
15:00 TRT (UTC+3)	Tanque 17', 55'; Yaldır 38'; Laura 79'	Report	Güveli (yellow card) 20'	Stadium: Samsun Stadium; Referee: Onur Özütoprak
