= 2005 UEFA European Under-19 Championship squads =

Player listings in youth football competition

Players born on or after 1 January 1986 were eligible to participate in the tournament. Players' age as of 18 July 2005 – the tournament's opening day. Players in bold have later been capped at full international level.

== Group A ==
=== Germany ===
Head coach: (Germany) Uli Stielike

No.	Pos.	Player	Date of birth (age)	Caps	Club
1	GK	Florian Fromlowitz	2 July 1986 (aged 19)		(Germany) 1. FC Kaiserslautern
2	MF	Markus Heppke	11 April 1986 (aged 19)		(Germany) Schalke 04
3	DF	Sascha Dum	3 July 1986 (aged 19)		(Germany) Bayer Leverkusen
4	DF	Robert Müller	12 November 1986 (aged 18)		(Germany) Hertha BSC
6	DF	Niko Bungert	24 October 1986 (aged 18)		(Germany) Schalke 04
7	DF	Markus Steinhöfer	7 March 1986 (aged 19)		(Germany) Bayern Munich II
8	MF	**Eugen Polanski**	17 March 1986 (aged 19)		(Germany) Borussia Mönchengladbach
9	FW	Mustafa Kucukovic	27 April 1986 (aged 19)		(Germany) Hamburger SV
10	FW	**Ashkan Dejagah**	5 July 1986 (aged 19)		(Germany) VfL Wolfsburg
11	DF	**Stephan Schröck**	21 August 1986 (aged 18)		(Germany) Greuther Fürth
12	GK	**Manuel Neuer**	27 March 1986 (aged 19)		(Germany) Schalke 04
13	FW	Jérôme Polenz	7 November 1986 (aged 18)		(Germany) Werder Bremen
14	MF	Denis Epstein	2 July 1986 (aged 19)		(Germany) 1. FC Köln
15	MF	Dennis Kempe	24 June 1986 (aged 19)		(Germany) Borussia Mönchengladbach
16	MF	Florian Müller	30 December 1986 (aged 18)		(Germany) Union Berlin
17	MF	**Kevin-Prince Boateng**	6 March 1987 (aged 18)		(Germany) Hertha BSC
18	FW	**Chhunly Pagenburg**	10 November 1986 (aged 18)		(Germany) 1. FC Nürnberg

=== Greece ===
Head coach: (Greece) Nikos Nioplias

No.	Pos.	Player	Date of birth (age)	Caps	Club
1	GK	Alexandros Kasmeridis	23 April 1986 (aged 19)		(Greece) OFI
2	DF	**Giannis Maniatis**	12 October 1986 (aged 18)		(Greece) Panionios
3	MF	Stefanos Siontis	4 September 1987 (aged 17)		(Greece) Panathinaikos
4	DF	Theodoros Tripotseris	4 March 1986 (aged 19)		(Greece) Panathinaikos
5	DF	Christos Lisgaras	1 May 1987 (aged 18)		(Greece) Olympiacos
6	MF	Sotiris Balafas	19 August 1986 (aged 18)		(Greece) PAOK
7	DF	Charalampos Perperidis	29 March 1986 (aged 19)		(Greece) Iraklis
8	MF	Stelios Iliadis	3 June 1986 (aged 19)		(Greece) PAOK
9	FW	Antonis Petropoulos	28 January 1986 (aged 19)		(Greece) Chaidari
10	FW	**Lazaros Christodoulopoulos**	19 December 1986 (aged 18)		(Greece) PAOK
11	FW	Christos Aravidis	13 March 1987 (aged 18)		(Greece) Akratitos
12	GK	Dimitrios Sotiriou	13 September 1987 (aged 17)		(Greece) Panionios
13	DF	**Georgios Tzavelas**	26 November 1987 (aged 17)		(Greece) Terpsithea
14	FW	Vasilis Sachinidis	20 January 1986 (aged 19)		(Greece) Ionikos
15	MF	Dimitrios Kiliaras	23 March 1986 (aged 19)		(Greece) Ergotelis
16	MF	**Grigoris Makos**	18 January 1987 (aged 18)		(Greece) Panionios
17	DF	Efthimios Kotitsas	25 March 1986 (aged 19)		(Greece) Ionikos
18	MF	Nikolaos Soulidis	28 October 1986 (aged 18)		(Greece) Iraklis

=== Northern Ireland ===
Head coach: (Northern Ireland) Mal Donaghy

No.	Pos.	Player	Date of birth (age)	Caps	Club
1	GK	**Jonathan Tuffey**	20 January 1987 (aged 18)		(England) Coventry
2	MF	Chris Turner	3 January 1987 (aged 18)		(England) Derby County
3	DF	Paul Hamilton	28 October 1986 (aged 18)		(Northern Ireland) Linfield
4	DF	Kyle McVey	7 July 1986 (aged 19)		(Northern Ireland) Coleraine
5	DF	**Rory McArdle**	1 May 1987 (aged 18)		(England) Sheffield Wednesday
6	DF	Aaron Callaghan	1 July 1987 (aged 18)		(Northern Ireland) Limavady United
7	DF	Dermot McCaffrey	29 March 1986 (aged 19)		(Scotland) Hibernian
8	MF	Andrew Cleary	6 April 1986 (aged 19)		(Northern Ireland) Lisburn Distillery
9	FW	Daryl Fordyce	2 January 1987 (aged 18)		(England) Portsmouth
10	FW	Matthew Doherty	29 April 1987 (aged 18)		(Scotland) Heart of Midlothian
11	MF	Kieran McKenna	14 May 1986 (aged 19)		(England) Tottenham
12	GK	Paul Willis	5 March 1986 (aged 19)		(England) Liverpool
13	FW	Paul McCrink	10 November 1987 (aged 17)		(England) Coventry City
14	MF	Aidan Watson	19 August 1986 (aged 18)		(Northern Ireland) Glentoran
15	MF	David Buchanan	6 May 1986 (aged 19)		(England) Bury
16	MF	**Jonny Steele**	7 February 1986 (aged 19)		(United States) Baltimore Blast
17	FW	Michael Carvill	3 April 1988 (aged 17)		(England) Charlton Athletic
18	FW	Thomas Stewart	12 November 1986 (aged 18)		(England) Wolverhampton Wanderers

=== Serbia and Montenegro ===
Head coach: (Serbia and Montenegro) Zvonko Živković

No.	Pos.	Player	Date of birth (age)	Caps	Club
1	GK	Aleksandar Jović	5 March 1986 (aged 19)		(Serbia and Montenegro) Vojvodina
2	MF	Predrag Pavlović	19 June 1986 (aged 19)		(Serbia and Montenegro) Partizan
3	DF	Marko Đalović	19 May 1986 (aged 19)		(Serbia and Montenegro) Red Star Belgrade
4	MF	**Gojko Kačar**	26 January 1987 (aged 18)		(Serbia and Montenegro) Vojvodina
5	DF	Milan Perendija	5 January 1986 (aged 19)		(Serbia and Montenegro) Partizan
6	MF	**Milan Smiljanić**	19 November 1986 (aged 18)		(Serbia and Montenegro) Partizan
7	MF	Vladimir Bogdanović	5 October 1986 (aged 18)		(Serbia and Montenegro) Red Star Belgrade
8	DF	Nenad Lazarevski	3 July 1986 (aged 19)		(Serbia and Montenegro) Novi Sad
9	FW	Borko Veselinović	6 January 1986 (aged 19)		(Serbia and Montenegro) Partizan
10	MF	Nebojša Marinković	19 June 1986 (aged 19)		(Serbia and Montenegro) Partizan
11	FW	Marko Markovski	26 May 1986 (aged 19)		(Serbia and Montenegro) Zemun
12	GK	Dejan Muštur	28 February 1986 (aged 19)		(Serbia and Montenegro) Zeta
13	DF	Nenad Đurović	17 January 1986 (aged 19)		(Serbia and Montenegro) Sutjeska Nikšić
14	MF	Borislav Pavlović	3 May 1987 (aged 18)		(Serbia and Montenegro) Vojvodina
15	MF	Ljubomir Stevanović	8 August 1986 (aged 18)		(Serbia and Montenegro) Mladost Apatin
16	DF	**Nenad Tomović**	30 August 1987 (aged 17)		(Serbia and Montenegro) Red Star Belgrade
17	FW	Stefan Đurović	21 August 1987 (aged 17)		(Serbia and Montenegro) Vojvodina
18	FW	Nemanja Arsenijević	29 March 1986 (aged 19)		(Serbia and Montenegro) OFK Beograd

== Group B ==
=== Armenia ===
Head coach: (Armenia) Samvel Petrosyan

No.	Pos.	Player	Date of birth (age)	Caps	Club
1	GK	**Apoula Edel**	7 June 1986 (aged 19)		(Armenia) Pyunik
2	DF	Hayk Chilingaryan	1 February 1989 (aged 16)		(Armenia) Pyunik
3	DF	Mikheil Simonyan	29 July 1987 (aged 17)		(Armenia) Kotayk Abovian
4	MF	Armen Hovhannisyan	24 January 1986 (aged 19)		(Russia) Zenit Saint Petersburg II
5	DF	Rafael Safaryan	30 June 1986 (aged 19)		(Armenia) Pyunik
6	MF	Narek Manukyan	14 February 1987 (aged 18)		(Armenia) Banants
7	DF	Mkhitar Grigoryan	20 February 1986 (aged 19)		(Armenia) Pyunik
8	FW	Gurgen Meliksetyan	1 June 1986 (aged 19)		(Armenia) Gandzasar
9	FW	Aleksandr Petrosyan	28 May 1986 (aged 19)		(Armenia) Pyunik
10	MF	Zhora Hovhannisyan	16 April 1987 (aged 18)		(Armenia) Pyunik
11	FW	**Edgar Manucharyan**	19 January 1987 (aged 18)		(Armenia) Pyunik
12	GK	**Grigor Meliksetyan**	18 August 1986 (aged 18)		(Armenia) Pyunik
13	DF	Artur Stepanyan	14 April 1987 (aged 18)		(Russia) Sokol-Saratov
14	MF	Artak Hovhannisyan	8 September 1988 (aged 16)		(Armenia) Ararat Yerevan
15	FW	Carl Lombé	18 May 1986 (aged 19)		(Armenia) Pyunik
16	DF	Vahe Mehrabyan	25 August 1986 (aged 18)		(Armenia) Ararat Yerevan
17	DF	Artak Oseyan	16 May 1987 (aged 18)		(Armenia) Banants
18	MF	Gevorg Nranyan	9 March 1986 (aged 19)		(Armenia) Ararat Yerevan

=== England ===
Head coach: (England) Martin Hunter

No.	Pos.	Player	Date of birth (age)	Caps	Club
1	GK	David Martin	22 January 1986 (aged 19)		(England) Milton Keynes Dons
2	DF	Anthony McMahon	24 March 1986 (aged 19)		(England) Middlesbrough
3	DF	Laurence Wilson	10 October 1986 (aged 18)		(England) Everton
4	DF	Matthew Mills	14 July 1986 (aged 19)		(England) Southampton
5	DF	David Wheater	14 February 1987 (aged 18)		(England) Middlesbrough
6	DF	Martin Cranie	23 September 1986 (aged 18)		(England) Southampton
7	MF	Grant Leadbitter	7 January 1986 (aged 19)		(England) Sunderland
8	MF	Mark Noble	8 May 1987 (aged 18)		(England) West Ham
9	FW	**Dexter Blackstock**	20 May 1986 (aged 19)		(England) Southampton
10	FW	Matty Fryatt	5 March 1986 (aged 19)		(England) Walsall
11	MF	Lee Holmes	2 April 1987 (aged 18)		(England) Derby County
12	DF	Philip Ifil	18 November 1986 (aged 18)		(England) Tottenham
13	GK	**John Ruddy**	24 October 1986 (aged 18)		(England) Everton
14	FW	Ryan Jarvis	11 July 1986 (aged 19)		(England) Norwich City
15	MF	Ritchie Jones	26 September 1986 (aged 18)		(England) Manchester United
16	MF	**James Morrison**	25 May 1986 (aged 19)		(England) Middlesbrough
17	MF	Ryan Smith	10 November 1986 (aged 18)		(England) Arsenal
18	MF	Andrew Taylor	1 August 1986 (aged 18)		(England) Middlesbrough

=== France ===
Head coach: (France) Jean Gallice

No.	Pos.	Player	Date of birth (age)	Caps	Club
1	GK	**Hugo Lloris**	26 December 1986 (aged 18)		(France) Nice
2	DF	Yassin Moutaouakil	18 July 1986 (aged 19)		(France) Châteauroux
3	DF	Cédric Cambon	20 September 1986 (aged 18)		(France) Montpellier
4	MF	**Abou Diaby**	11 May 1986 (aged 19)		(France) Auxerre
5	DF	Mohamed Chakouri	21 May 1986 (aged 19)		(France) Montpellier
6	MF	Didier Digard	12 July 1986 (aged 19)		(France) Le Havre
7	MF	Olivier N'Siabamfumu	17 March 1986 (aged 19)		(France) Rennes
8	DF	**Younès Kaboul**	4 January 1986 (aged 19)		(France) Auxerre
9	FW	**Moussa Sow**	19 January 1986 (aged 19)		(France) Rennes
10	MF	**Djamel Abdoun**	14 February 1986 (aged 19)		(France) Ajaccio
11	FW	Abdoulaye Baldé	30 November 1986 (aged 18)		(France) Amiens
12	FW	**Yoann Gourcuff**	11 July 1986 (aged 19)		(France) Rennes
13	MF	Frédéric Sammaritano	23 March 1986 (aged 19)		(France) Nantes
14	DF	Yoan Gouffran	25 May 1986 (aged 19)		(France) Caen
15	FW	Franck Dja Djédjé	2 June 1986 (aged 19)		(France) Paris Saint-Germain
16	GK	Geoffrey Jourdren	4 February 1986 (aged 19)		(France) Montpellier
17	MF	**Yohan Cabaye**	14 January 1986 (aged 19)		(France) Lille
18	DF	Florian Marange	3 March 1986 (aged 19)		(France) Bordeaux

=== Norway ===
Head coach: (Norway) Tor Ole Skullerund

No.	Pos.	Player	Date of birth (age)	Caps	Club
1	GK	Joacim Heier	27 January 1986 (aged 19)		(Norway) Moss
2	DF	Arnar Førsund	29 July 1986 (aged 18)		(Norway) Sandefjord
3	DF	Magnus Ueland	17 March 1986 (aged 19)		(Norway) Bryne
4	DF	**Johan Lædre Bjørdal**	5 May 1986 (aged 19)		(Norway) Tønsberg
5	DF	**Steffen Hagen**	8 March 1986 (aged 19)		(Norway) Mandalskameratene
6	MF	**Per Ciljan Skjelbred**	16 June 1987 (aged 18)		(Norway) Rosenborg
7	MF	**Alexander Tettey**	4 April 1986 (aged 19)		(Norway) Rosenborg
8	MF	Dawda Leigh	27 June 1986 (aged 19)		(Norway) Skeid
9	FW	Bjarne Ingebretsen	10 October 1987 (aged 17)		(Norway) Lyn
10	FW	Jesper Mathisen	17 March 1987 (aged 18)		(Norway) Start
11	MF	Petter Bruer Hanssen	8 January 1986 (aged 19)		(Norway) Tønsberg
12	GK	Dag Ole Thomassen	28 August 1986 (aged 18)		(Norway) Pors Grenland
13	DF	Kevin Larsen	10 May 1986 (aged 19)		(Norway) Lyn
14	DF	**Tore Reginiussen**	10 April 1986 (aged 19)		(Norway) Alta
15	MF	Vidar Nisja	21 August 1986 (aged 18)		(Norway) Bryne
16	FW	Alexander Mathisen	24 November 1986 (aged 18)		(Norway) Vålerenga
17	FW	Karim Aoudia	8 April 1986 (aged 19)		(Norway) Oslo Øst
18	FW	Morten Hæstad	11 March 1987 (aged 18)		(Norway) Start
