= Thomassen =

Thomassen is a patronymic family name of Scandinavian and Dutch origin. It literally means "son of Thomas", i.e., approximately corresponds to Thomson. Notable people with the name include:

- Ann-Mari Thomassen (born 1964), Sámi politician
- Bjørn Thomassen (born 1968), Danish anthropologist and social scientist
- Carsten Thomassen (mathematician) (born 1948), Danish mathematician
- Carsten Thomassen (journalist) (1969–2008), Norwegian journalist and war correspondent
- Dag Ole Thomassen (born 1986), Norwegian football goalkeeper
- Dan Thomassen (born 1981), Danish football defender
- Einar Thomassen (born 1951), Norwegian Professor in Religious Studies
- Gustav Thomassen (1862–1929), Norwegian actor and theatre director
- Hedvig Mollestad Thomassen (born 1982), Norwegian jazz musician
- Ivar Thomassen (1954–2016), Norwegian folk singer, songwriter, and jazz pianist
- Jacques Thomassen (born 1945), Dutch organizational theorist
- Joachim Thomassen (born 1988), Norwegian football defender
- Jordy Thomassen (born 1993), Dutch football striker
- Kay Thomassen (born 1987), Dutch football midfielder
- Knut Thomassen (1921–2002), Norwegian actor and theatre director
- Magne Thomassen (born 1941), Norwegian speed skater
- Mariann Thomassen (born 1979), Norwegian musician from the rock band Surferosa
- Martijn Thomassen (born 1990), Dutch football defender
- Mikkjal Thomassen (born 1976), Danish field hockey player
- Mogens Thomassen (1914–1987), Danish field hockey player
- Petter Thomassen (1941–2003), Norwegian Conservative Party politician
- Reidar Thomassen (1936–2024), Norwegian writer
- Thomas Thomassen (1878–1962), Norwegian actor and theatre director
- Turid Thomassen (born 1965), Norwegian Red Party politician
- Wim Thomassen (1909–2001), Dutch politician
