= Kürşad Sürmeli =

Dutch footballer (born 1995)

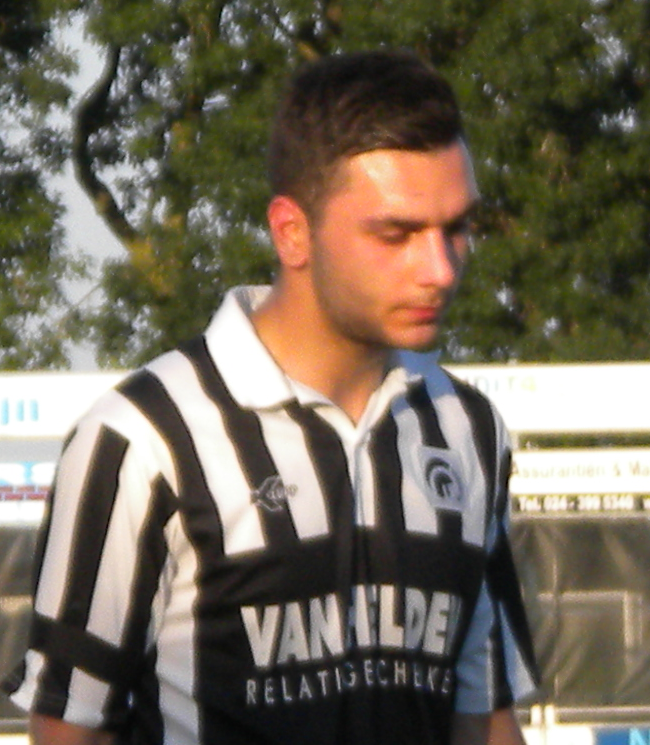
- Sürmeli with Achilles '29 in 2014 in a friendly against Sporting CP

Personal information
- Date of birth: 14 August 1995 (age 31)
- Place of birth: Nijmegen, Netherlands
- Height: 1.90 m (6 ft 3 in)
- Position: Midfielder

Team information
- Current team: 68 Aksarayspor
- Number: 25

Youth career
- SV Hatert
- Quick 1888
- 2008–2012: NEC

Senior career*
Years	Team	Apps	(Gls)
2012–2013	Sportclub NEC	10	(0)
2013–2017	Achilles '29	143	(12)
2018	Adanaspor	0	(0)
2018	Lienden	14	(0)
2018–2019	Giresunspor	12	(1)
2019–2020	Sint-Eloois-Winkel	19	(0)
2020–2021	Dordrecht	16	(0)
2021	MVV	14	(1)
2021–2023	Altınordu	51	(3)
2023–2025	ADO Den Haag	42	(1)
2025–	68 Aksarayspor	1	(0)
- * Club domestic league appearances and goals as of 13 September 2025

Kürşad Sürmeli (born 14 August 1995) is a Dutch footballer who plays as a midfielder for Turkish TFF 2. Lig club 68 Aksarayspor.

A youth product of NEC, Sürmeli experienced his breakthrough as part of the Achilles '29 team competing in the second-tier Eerste Divisie. He later played for clubs in Turkey and Belgium.

== Club career ==
=== Early years ===
Starting his career as a youth player at SV Hatert and Quick 1888, Sürmeli moved the youth academy of NEC in 2008. After failing to make the cut, he moved to NEC's amateur branch, Sportclub NEC. A few months later, he signed a contract, which made him a regular part of NEC Amateurs.

=== Achilles '29 ===
On 18 June 2013, Sürmeli joined Eerste Divisie club Achilles '29 in June 2013, and made his professional debut on 24 August 2013 in a game against Almere City FC in the absence of team captain Twan Smits who was serving a suspension. More than a month later, he appeared in an away game against FC Den Bosch (0–2 win) in the final minutes coming on for Levi Raja Boean. A week later he came in as a substitute for Kay Thomassen and scored the equaliser against Jong PSV with a strike from distance. The match was eventually won 3–2. Two weeks later, against Willem II, he replaced Smits again, this time because he suffered hamstring injury. Sürmeli also started as a defensive midfielder against Fortuna Sittard and in a KNVB Cup match against AZ. In the winter break, head coach François Gesthuizen decided to a system which facilitated two defensive midfielders instead of one, opening up a spot for Sürmeli in the starting eleven. The first league match of 2014 featured Sürmeli and Jop van Steen as central defensive midfielders was won 2–1 against Almere City. Due to an injury, he missed the upcoming away match against FC Dordrecht (4–2) and was only used as a substitute at home against FC Emmen (0–0). After a month without appearances, he made six appearances in a row, where he was used as a substitute in five of them. Sürmeli played the last four games of the season as a starter.

In the first ten matches of the following season, Sürmeli was a starter eight times and a used substitute once. On 28 September 2014, he scored two goals in the 0–4 away win at RKC Waalwijk and played the full 90 minutes: he scored the 0–1 and the 0–3 goals. Against MVV, he lost his starting spot due to an injury and he was benched for the next eight matches, although he came in as a substitute in seven of them. One of these matches, on 12 December, in the home game against VVV-Venlo (3–0), he scored the last goal as a substitute. After the winter break, he began as a starter on right midfield. On 2 March 2015, Sürmeli scored his fifth goal for Achilles, and his fourth of the season, in a match against Telstar with a long-distance strike. Two and a half weeks later, he headed in the 2–1 lead against Almere City from a cross by Twan Smits, in a match that ended 3–1. In the 2016–17 season, he suffered relegation from the Eerste Divisie with Achilles '29, after which he left as a free agent. After turning down offers from Italian Serie B club Carpi, and Turkish clubs Adanaspor and Adana Demirspor, he decided to stay with Achilles '29 in August.

=== Adanaspor and Lienden ===
In early January 2018, Sürmeli triggered a release clause to leave Achilles '29 in the winter break, after the club had filed for bankruptcy, and join Turkish TFF First League club Adanaspor. After making no appearances for the side he had his contract terminated at the end of the month, and he joined Dutch Tweede Divisie club FC Lienden on 31 January.

=== Giresunspor and Winkel ===
From the 2018–19 season, Sürmeli had an agreement to join De Treffers. At the end of July 2018, he left De Treffers before the start of the competition and signed a two-year contract with Giresunspor of the TFF First League. At the beginning of January 2019, he had his contract terminated as he had not received his salary. Afterwards, he had a deal with Osmanlıspor, but due to an injury the club refused to formalise the agreement and Sürmeli was left as a free agent.

On 12 July 2019, Sürmeli joined Sint-Eloois-Winkel, a team competing in the third-tier Belgian First Amateur Division.

=== Dordrecht and MVV ===
On 20 August 2020, Sürmeli returned to the Netherlands where he signed a one-year contract with FC Dordrecht. On 1 January 2021, he signed a one-and-a-half-year contract with an option for an addition year with league rivals MVV Maastricht. Upon his arrival, MVV manager Darije Kalezić praised him as a player with a "dominant presence", who could help the club reach a higher level.

=== Return to Turkey ===
On 14 August 2021, he signed a two-year contract with Altınordu.

=== ADO Den Haag ===
On 11 July 2023, Sürmeli returned to the Netherlands and signed a contract with ADO Den Haag for two years with an optional third year. He made his competitive debut for the club on 25 August, starting in a 2–1 away win over FC Den Bosch in the Eerste Divisie. On 2 February 2024, he scored his first goal for the club, helping ADO to a 3–1 away victory against TOP Oss. Sürmeli scored the one goal in 32 league appearances that season, as ADO qualified for the play-offs in fifth place.

== Career statistics ==
As of match played 25 May 2024

Appearances and goals by club, season and competition
Club	Season	League			National Cup (Note: Includes KNVB Beker, Belgian Cup, Turkish Cup)		Other		Total	
Club	Season	Division	Apps	Goals	Apps	Goals	Apps	Goals	Apps	Goals
Achilles	2013–14	Eerste Divisie	23	1	1	0	—		24	1
Achilles	2014–15	Eerste Divisie	34	5	1	0	—		35	5
Achilles	2015–16	Eerste Divisie	35	2	3	1	—		38	3
Achilles	2016–17	Eerste Divisie	36	3	1	0	—		37	3
Achilles	2017–18	Tweede Divisie	15	1	3	0	—		18	1
Achilles	Total		143	12	9	1	0	0	152	13
Lienden	2017–18	Tweede Divisie	14	0	—		—		14	0
Giresunspor	2018–19	TFF First League	12	1	2	0	—		14	1
KVC Winkel Sport	2019–20	Belgian National Division 1	19	0	—		—		19	0
Dordrecht	2020–21	Eerste Divisie	16	0	1	0	—		17	0
MVV	2020–21	Eerste Divisie	14	1	1	0	—		15	1
Altinordu	2021–22	TFF First League	28	2	—		—		28	2
Altinordu	2022–23	TFF First League	23	1	—		—		23	1
Altinordu	Total		51	3	—		—		51	3
ADO Den Haag	2023–24	Eerste Divisie	32	1	4	0	3 (Note: Appearances in Eredivisie promotion/relegation playoffs)	0	39	1
Career total			301	18	17	1	3	0	321	19
