= Muhammed Ali Doğan =

Turkish footballer (born 1995)

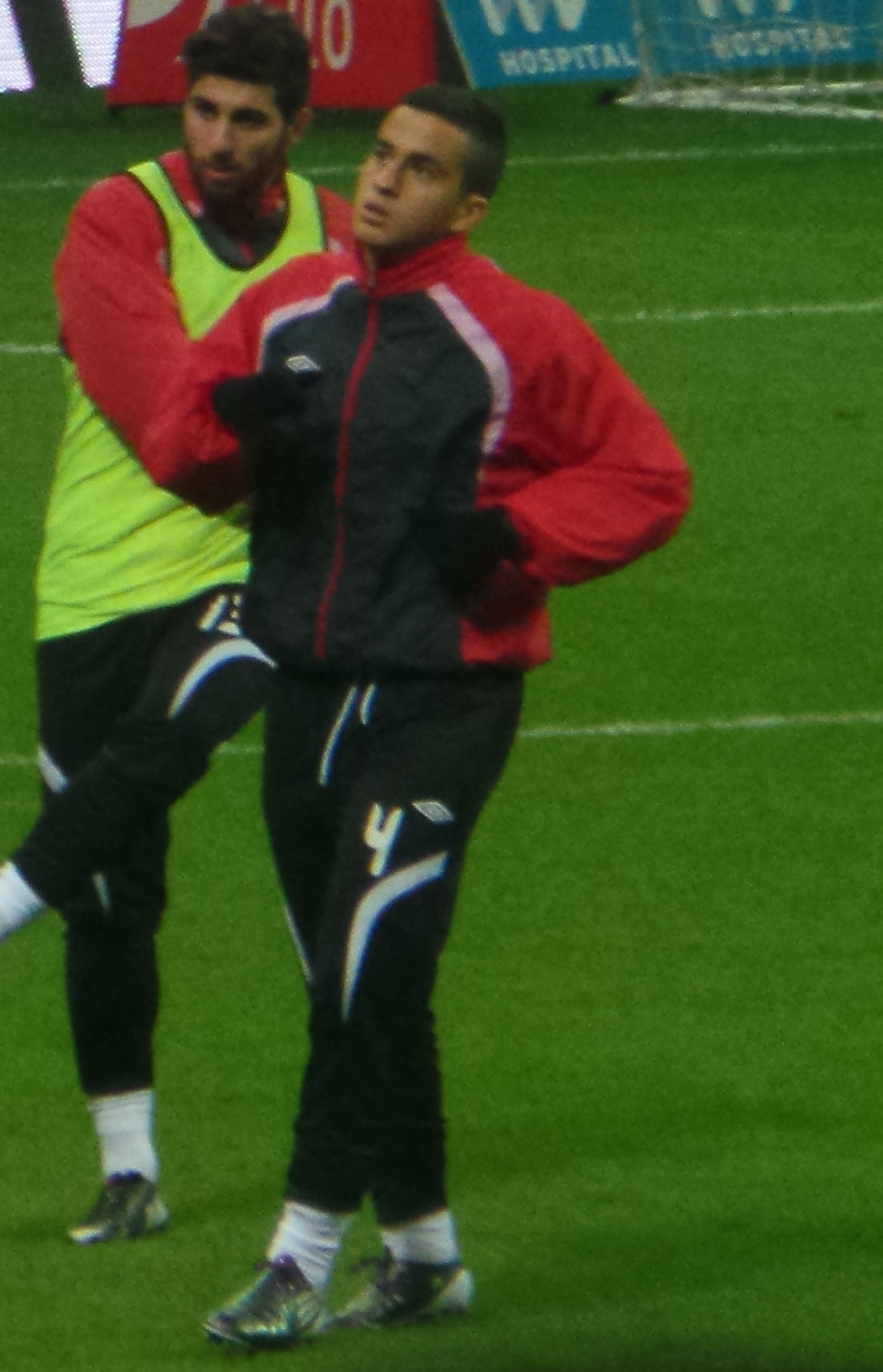
- Doğan warming up for Elazığspor in 2013

Personal information
- Date of birth: 10 August 1995 (age 31)
- Place of birth: Oberhausen, Germany
- Height: 1.76 m (5 ft 9 in)
- Position: Defensive midfielder

Team information
- Current team: Erbaaspor
- Number: 12

Youth career
- SG Wattenscheid 09

Senior career*
Years	Team	Apps	(Gls)
2013–2016	Elazığspor	8	(0)
2016–2019	Balıkesirspor	56	(2)
2019–2020	Menemenspor	19	(0)
2020–2022	Balıkesirspor	31	(1)
2022–2025	Vanspor	79	(6)
2025	Yeni Mersin İY	12	(1)
2025	24 Erzincanspor	13	(3)
2026	Mardin	7	(0)
2026–	Erbaaspor	3	(3)

International career
2014	Turkey U19	4	(0)
- * Club domestic league appearances and goals as of 1 October 2026

Muhammed Ali Doğan (born 10 August 1995) is a Turkish footballer who plays as a midfielder for TFF 2. Lig club Erbaaspor. He made his Süper Lig debut on 2 March 2014. Born in Germany, he represented Turkey at under-19 international level.
