= 24 Erzincanspor =

Turkish football club

Erzincanspor Club
- Full name: Erzincanspor Football Investments, Inc.
- Founded: 1984; 42 years ago
- Ground: Erzincan 13 Şubat Şehir Stadyumu; Erzincan
- Capacity: 12,981
- Chairman: Alaattin Yavuz Güneş
- Manager: Mustafa Sarıgül
- 2025–26: TFF 2. Lig, White, 11th of 19
- Website: www.erzincanspor.org.tr
Home colours	Away colours	Third colours

Erzincanspor is a Turkish football club located in Erzincan, Turkey.

== History ==
The club was founded in 1984 under the name Refahiyespor, in the town Refahiye, Erzincan Province. The biggest club in the region, Erzincanspor, dissolved in 2014 and Refahiyespor changed its name to Erzincan Refahiyespor as of July 2012. It lay its claim as the (unofficial) successor club. On 5 August 2015, the club again changed its name to 24 Erzincanspor.

On 8 August 2016, 24 Erzincanspor was sponsored by the Turkish mining company Anagold, and was thereafter known as Anagold 24 Erzincanspor. Being an amateur club for most of its existence, on 24 July 2020 it won the TFF Third League playoff finals in a 2–0 win over Aksaray Belediyespor and was promoted into the TFF Second League for the first time in its history.

Their greatest achievement in cup competitions was eliminating Adana Demirspor on penalties to reach the last 16 in the Turkish Cup of the 2023-24 season.

== Colours and badge ==
Erzincanspor's colors are red and black.

== Current squad ==
As of 5 December 2025

Note: Flags indicate national team as defined under FIFA eligibility rules; some limited exceptions apply. Players may hold more than one non-FIFA nationality.

No.	Pos.	Nation	Player
3	DF	TUR	Canberk Özdemir
4	DF	TUR	Hakan Eren Atabey (on loan from Fatih Karagümrük)
5	MF	TUR	Batuhan Artarslan
6	MF	TUR	Salih Sebetci
7	FW	TUR	Ahmet Dereli
8	MF	TUR	Arda Berkay Araz
10	FW	TUR	Kerim Frei
11	FW	TUR	Muhammed Ali Çağlar
12	MF	TUR	Muhammed Ali Doğan
14	FW	TUR	Sabit Hakan Yılmaz
17	FW	TUR	Mehmet Akyüz
19	MF	TUR	Berke Çelik
20	MF	TUR	Mustafa Can Tetik
22	DF	TUR	İhsan Göktaş
26	FW	TUR	Miraç Asıltekin

No.	Pos.	Nation	Player
28	DF	TUR	Baran Can
29	FW	TUR	Oltan Karakullukçu
34	MF	NED	Osman Resat Bulut
35	FW	TUR	Tan Yavru
40	GK	TUR	Alper Mutlu
41	DF	TUR	Ata Mert Sergi
46	GK	TUR	Ömer Kahveci
48	DF	TUR	Rıdvan Türker
54	DF	TUR	Hüsamettin Tut
55	DF	TUR	Ercan Yazıcı
61	MF	TUR	Ebrar Cumur (on loan from 1461 Trabzon)
60	DF	TUR	Berat Çalık
95	GK	TUR	Emre Şanal
99	FW	TUR	Metincan Cici
—	FW	TUR	Burak Yıldız

=== Out on loan ===
Note: Flags indicate national team as defined under FIFA eligibility rules; some limited exceptions apply. Players may hold more than one non-FIFA nationality.

No.	Pos.	Nation	Player
—	DF	TUR	Emirhan Demir (at Artvin Hopaspor until 30 June 2026)
—	DF	TUR	Emre Sarıkaya (at Çorluspor 1947 until 30 June 2026)

No.	Pos.	Nation	Player
—	FW	TUR	Ali Sefer (at İnkılap FSK until 30 June 2026)

== Notable (ex-)players ==
- Kerem Aktürkoğlu
- Hayrullah Mert Akyüz
- Muhammed Demirci
