= Alexandros Kasmeridis =

Greek footballer

Personal information
- Date of birth: 23 April 1986 (age 40)
- Place of birth: Serres, Greece
- Height: 1.92 m (6 ft 4 in)
- Position: Goalkeeper

Youth career
- –2002: Anatoli Serres
- 2002–2006: OFI

Senior career*
Years	Team	Apps	(Gls)
2006–2011	OFI	6	(0)
2011–2012	Thrasyvoulos	26	(0)
2012–2013	Levadiakos	5	(0)
2013–2014	Asteras Magoula	20	(0)
2014–2015	Olympiacos Volos	9	(0)
2015–2017	OFI	14	(0)
2017–2019	Irodotos	13	(0)
2019–2020	PAO Krousonas		

International career
2004–2006	Greece U19	8	(0)
2006–2008	Greece U21	9	(0)
- * Club domestic league appearances and goals

Alexandros Kasmeridis (Greek: Αλέξανδρος Κασμερίδης, born 23 April 1986) is a Greek former footballer who played as a goalkeeper. He started his career at OFI in 2002 and stayed there until 2011, followed by three one-year spells at Thrasyvoulos, Levadiakos, Asteras Magoula and Olympiacos Volos, until he returned to OFI in 2015.

Kasmeridis is a former member of all youth national teams of Greece; under-17, under-19 and under-21 – he was also part of Greece's 2005 UEFA European Under-19 Football Championship squad.

== Club career ==
=== Early career ===
Kasmeridis was born in Serres and, during his early teens, he played for local club Anatoli. Despite the efforts of Panserraikos to sign him, he decided to join OFI in 2002 at the age of 15. He played for the club's amateur team until 2006, when he signed his first professional contract. With OFI Amateurs, he won the 2004 Heraklion Football Clubs Association Cup against PANOM.

During his whole spell at OFI, Kasmeridis was always a backup goalkeeper behind other goalkeeping talents produced by the club, such as Kostas Chaniotakis, Michalis Sifakis and Sifis Daskalakis. Even during the later years, goalkeepers from Panathinaikos (Arkadiusz Malarz and Alexandros Tzorvas) or abroad (Tristan Peersman) were preferred, so he earned little playing time.

=== OFI ===
Kasmeridis made his Super League debut on 30 November 2008 coming as a substitute during an away game against Panthrakikos, when Malatz was injured in the 26th minute. He then went on to make another 3 performances for OFI during the 2008–09 season, which saw the club ending in 14th place and being relegated from the first division for the first time since 1976.

The 2009–10 season was worse for Kasmeridis, even though OFI was playing in the Beta Ethniki – he was the second goalkeeper behind Polychronis Vezyridis and only played once in the second-last game of the promotion play-offs against Pierikos because Vezyridis was banned from the match. OFI eventually missed promotion at the final fixture, so they stayed in the second division.

Kasmeridis was still a backup for OFI in the 2010–11 season, as he made a total of 3 appearances in the now-called Football League. His season debut was on an away game against PAS Giannina, coming as a substitute for Vezyridis, after the latter was hit by a fan of PAS. He made another appearance in the regular season against Ionikos and a final appearance in the last game of the promotion play-offs against Diagoras, where OFI won and secured promotion to the Super League after 2 years. However, Kasmeridis did not fit the plans of his manager, Nikos Anastopoulos, for the following season and was asked to look for a new club.

=== Thrasyvoulos ===
On 10 September 2011, a day after his OFI contract was terminated, Kasmeridis signed a one-year contract with Thrasyvoulos in the second division. He was a regular for the club in the 2011–12 season, making 26 appearances and earning one red card in the final game against Anagennisi Epanomi.

Kasmeridis blocked two penalties in the 4–2 penalty shoot-out win in his team's Round of 16 match against Super League side Levadiakos during the 2011–12 Greek Cup campaign.

=== Levadiakos ===
On 12 June 2012, Kasmeridis signed a two-year contract for Levadiakos. In a later interview, he justified his decision to join Levadiakos by saying that his goal was to establish himself in the Super League. He made his league debut on 8 October 2012 during a home match against Panthrakikos – there, first-choice keeper Dimitris Kyriakidis received a red card on the 37th minute and Kasmeridis entered as a substitute for Stefano Napoleoni; he conceded an additional 2 goals for a final result of 0–3 for the visitors. However, Kasmeridis never managed to establish himself as the first-choice goalkeeper at Levadiakos instead of Kyriakidis, as he only managed to make 3 ninety-minute appearances at the 2012–13 Super League – as a result, he terminated his contract one year early in May 2013 and were released from the club.

== International career ==
=== Greece under-17 ===
Kasmeridis was called up to the Greek national under-17 football team on 6 March 2003 for a friendly game against Yugoslavia on 8 March.

=== Greece under-19 ===
On 28 August 2004, Kasmeridis, still a player of OFI Amateurs at the time, was called for the first time to the Greek national under-19 football team to play in a friendly match against Netherlands under-19 on 4 September. He did not get any playing time, but made his debut a month later, on 8 October, in a 2005 UEFA European Under-19 Football Championship qualification match against Faroe Islands. He made good appearances in the rest of the qualifiers and Greece qualified to the final stage of the 2005 UEFA European Under-19 Football Championship.

==== 2005 UEFA European U19 Championship finals ====
Kasmeridis was a member of Greece's squad in the finals. He played in the victorious first game of the group stage against the hosts, Northern Ireland, and in the second game against Germany, where Greece lost 3–0. Greece was eventually eliminated after another 3–0 defeat against Serbia and Montenegro, a game which Kasmeridis watched from the bench as Dimitrios Sotiriou took his place in the starting lineup.

=== Greece U21 ===
On 16 October 2006, Kasmeridis made his debut for the Greece under-21 in a friendly match against Ethnikos Asteras as a second-half substitute for Leonidas Panagopoulos. He went on to make 6 appearances in 2007, with Panagopoulos and Kasmeridis swapping places in the starting lineup, and 2 appearances in 2008, all of which as a starter.
