= Mert Akyüz =

Turkish footballer (born 1993)

Personal information
- Full name: Hayrullah Mert Akyüz
- Date of birth: 2 October 1993 (age 33)
- Place of birth: Gülağaç, Turkey
- Height: 1.85 m (6 ft 1 in)
- Position: Goalkeeper

Team information
- Current team: Ankaraspor
- Number: 1

Youth career
- 2004–2011: Adanaspor

Senior career*
Years	Team	Apps	(Gls)
2011–2019	Adanaspor	71	(0)
2012	→ İskenderunspor 1967 (loan)	2	(0)
2013–2014	→ Payas Belediyespor 1975 (loan)	18	(0)
2019	Sivas Belediyespor	15	(0)
2020	Tuzlaspor	1	(0)
2020–2023	24 Erzincanspor	51	(0)
2023–2024	Karaman FK	31	(0)
2024–2025	Yeni Mersin İY	14	(0)
2025–	Ankaraspor	26	(0)

International career
2013	Turkey Olympic	3	(0)
2013	Turkey U-20	1	(0)
2015	Turkey A2	2	(0)
Medal record
Turkey A2
Bronze medal – third place	Islamic Solidarity Games	2013
- * Club domestic league appearances and goals as of 8 November 2025

Hayrullah Mert Akyüz (born 2 October 1993) is a Turkish professional footballer who plays for TFF 2. Lig club Ankaraspor.

== Career ==
=== Early years ===
Intended to be a midfielder originally, while playing as a midfielder at his first school's football team, Akyüz considered to be a goalkeeper by recommendation of his father, who had been playing also as goalie in his childhood. He started to play football in 2002.

=== Club career ===
Akyüz made his TFF First League debut on 19 December 2014, against Osmanlıspor, which ended 1–1 at Adana 5 Ocak Stadium. Akyüz renewed his contract with Adanaspor on 23 June 2015. Akyüz is linked with Galatasaray in July 2015.

=== International career ===
Akyüz was selected for Turkey A2 team squad for 2013-15 International Challenge Trophy game against Italy on 23 March 2015. He played the game against Italy, ended 5–3 for Turkey A2, after penally-shootouts in which Akyüz saved two penalties.

Akyüz was called up for the Turkey national football team by manager Fatih Terim, for the UEFA Euro 2016 qualifying stage Group A encounter against Czech Republic, on 10 October 2015. On 10 November 2015, Akyüz is called up for Turkey again for friendly games against Qatar and Greece.

== Playing style ==
Based on his 2015 training regime, Akyüz trains different disciplines, including swimming, and skipping.
