= Erzincan 13 February City Stadium =

Association football stadium in Erzincan, Turkey

- Erzincan 13 Şubat Şehir Stadyumu
- Interactive map of Erzincan 13 February City Stadium
- Location: Erzincan, Turkey
- Coordinates: 39.75083°N 39.49639°E
- Owner: Youth and Sports Directorate of Erzincan Province
- Capacity: 12.000
- Type: Stadium
- Events: Football, floor curling
- Surface: Grass
- Field size: 68 m × 105 m (223 ft × 344 ft)

Construction
- Groundbreaking: 2019
- Opened: 28 August 2022; 4 years ago
- Cost: ₺ 138m (approx. US$ 8.4m)
- Architect: Alper Aksoy

Tenant
- 24 Erzincanspor

Erzincan 13 February City Stadium (Turkish: Erzincan 13 Şubat Şehir Stadyumu), is a stadium in Erzincan, eastern Turkey. It was opened in 2022.

== Overview ==
The Erzincan 13 Şubat City Stadium is named "13 Şubat" ("13 February") to commemorate the liberation of the city in 1918 from the Russian military occupation after the Battle of Erzincan. It is located in Atatürk Neighborhood in the center of Erzincan Turkey. It was built on the place of the old stadium, of which demolition started in the Summer of 2018. The construction started in the Fall 2019. It was opened on 28 August 2022 after four years of construction.

The field has a natural grass surface. It features lighting. It has a parking lot with a 650 car capacity. Thanks to the heating system under the football field, the snow accumulated on the field can be melted. The stadium generates its own electrical power of 1 MW by solar palnels placed on top of the grand stands.

It is home to the third-level TFF 2. Lig playing football club 24 Erzincanspor. The facility has also an indoor court for floor curling, an iceless variation of curling.

== International competitions hosted ==
On 31 May 2024, Turkey women's national football team played a UEFA Women's Euro 2025 qualifying League B match against Azerbaijan, which won 1–0.
