= Ahmet Dereli =

Turkish footballer (born 1992)

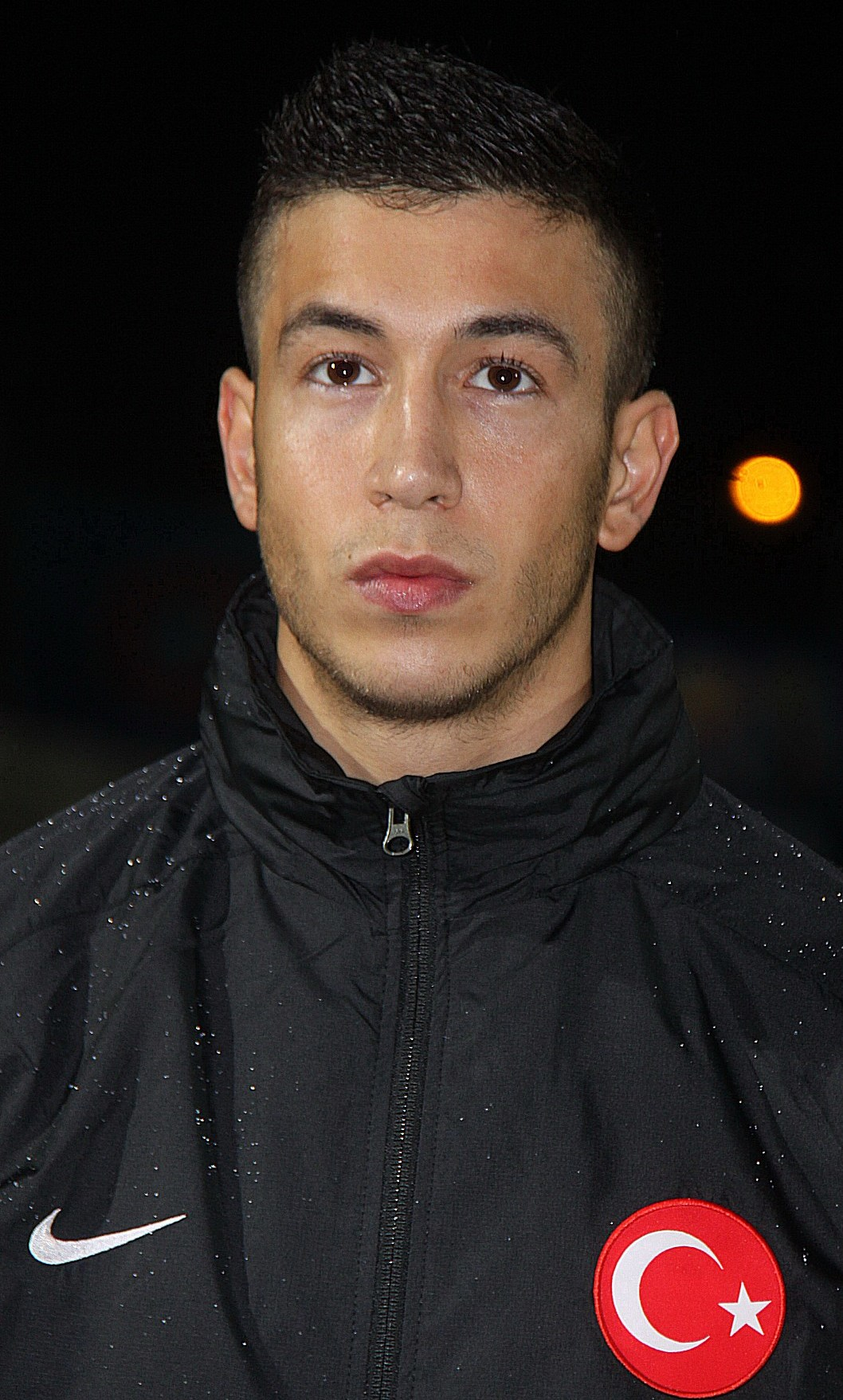

Personal information
- Date of birth: 22 October 1992 (age 34)
- Place of birth: Berlin, Germany
- Height: 1.92 m (6 ft 4 in)
- Position: Winger

Team information
- Current team: 24 Erzincanspor
- Number: 7

Senior career*
Years	Team	Apps	(Gls)
2011–2012	Berliner AK 07	15	(4)
2012–2020	Adanaspor	145	(22)
2013	→ Hatayspor (loan)	5	(0)
2018	→ Fethiyespor (loan)	14	(4)
2020–2023	Altınordu	65	(19)
2023–2024	Amed	22	(1)
2024–2025	Fethiyespor	30	(7)
2025	Eskişehir Anadolu SF	10	(5)
2025–	24 Erzincanspor	13	(7)

International career^{‡}
2013	Turkey U21	1	(0)
- * Club domestic league appearances and goals as of 23 September 2023 ‡ National team caps and goals as of 10 October 2016

Ahmet Dereli (born 22 October 1992) is a footballer who plays for TFF 2. Lig club 24 Erzincanspor.

Ahmet was born in Germany to parents of Turkish descent. He made his debut for the Turkey national under-21 football team in a friendly 2-0 loss to Austria U21.
