= Jop van Steen =

Dutch footballer (born 1984)

Personal information
- Date of birth: 21 December 1984 (age 41)
- Place of birth: Nijmegen, Netherlands
- Height: 1.80 m (5 ft 11 in)
- Position: Midfielder

Youth career
- VV Union
- Quick 1888

Senior career*
| Years | Team | Apps | (Gls) |
| –2006 | Quick 1888 | ? | (?) |
| 2006–2010 | RKHVV | ? | (?) |
| 2010–2011 | Juliana '31 | 21 | (13) |
| 2011–2013 | RKHVV | ? | (?) |
| 2013–2017 | Achilles '29 | 137 | (11) |
| 2017–2018 | Lienden | 22 | (0) |
- * Club domestic league appearances and goals

Jop van Steen (born 21 December 1984) is a Dutch former footballer who played as a midfielder.

== Club career ==
He made his professional debut in the Eerste Divisie for Achilles '29 on 3 August 2013 in a game against FC Emmen.

Van Steen retired from football at the end of the 2017–18 season, where he mainly featured as a substitute for Lienden.
