= Hüsamettin Tut =

Turkish footballer

Personal information
- Date of birth: 1 January 1991 (age 35)
- Place of birth: Ulubey, Ordu, Turkey
- Height: 1.71 m (5 ft 7 in)
- Position: Left back

Team information
- Current team: 24 Erzincanspor
- Number: 54

Youth career
- 2003–2007: Orduspor

Senior career*
Years	Team	Apps	(Gls)
2007–2015	Orduspor	58	(1)
2011	→ Tarsus İ.Y. (loan)	11	(0)
2011–2012	→ Çankırıspor (loan)	30	(1)
2013–2014	→ Giresunspor (loan)	41	(1)
2015–2019	Giresunspor	107	(0)
2019–2020	Keçiörengücü	26	(0)
2020–2022	Giresunspor	30	(1)
2022	Ankara Keçiörengücü	3	(0)
2022–2023	Sakaryaspor	13	(0)
2023–2024	Şanlıurfaspor	3	(0)
2024	52 Orduspor	9	(0)
2024–	24 Erzincanspor	37	(0)

International career
2009	Turkey U18	2	(0)
- * Club domestic league appearances and goals as of 30 November 2025

Hüsamettin Tut (born 1 January 1991) is a Turkish footballer who plays for TFF 2. Lig club 24 Erzincanspor. He made his Süper Lig debut on 31 August 2012.
