= Erdi Dikmen =

Turkish footballer

Personal information
- Date of birth: 6 February 1997 (age 29)
- Place of birth: Samsun, Turkey
- Height: 1.95 m (6 ft 5 in)
- Position: Defender

Team information
- Current team: Sarıyer
- Number: 4

Youth career
- 2007–2012: Samsunspor

Senior career*
Years	Team	Apps	(Gls)
2012–2017	Samsunspor	3	(0)
2017–2020	Ankara Keçiörengücü	68	(6)
2020–2022	Ankaragücü	28	(0)
2022	→ Altınordu (loan)	11	(0)
2022–2023	Altınordu	29	(0)
2023–2025	Sakaryaspor	43	(2)
2025–2026	Vanspor	22	(1)
2026–	Sarıyer	3	(0)

International career^{‡}
2012	Turkey U15	3	(0)
2012–2013	Turkey U16	4	(0)
- * Club domestic league appearances and goals as of 6 November 2026 ‡ National team caps and goals as of 06:59, 16 May 2021 (UTC)

Erdi Dikmen (born 6 February 1997) is a Turkish professional footballer who plays as a defender for TFF 1. Lig club Sarıyer.

== Professional career ==
Dikmen is a product of the youth academy of Samsunspor, and signed his first professional contract with them in 2012. He transferred to Ankara Keçiörengücü and helped them get promoted to the TFF First League. On 27 September 2020, he transferred to Ankaragücü. He made his professional debut with Ankaragücü in a 0–0 Süper Lig tie with Sivasspor on 27 September 2020.

On 17 June 2022, Dikmen signed a two-year contract with Altınordu after playing for the club on loan previously.

== International career ==
Dikmen is a former youth international for Turkey, having represented the Turkey U15s and U16s.
