= Joacim Heier =

Norwegian footballer (born 1986)

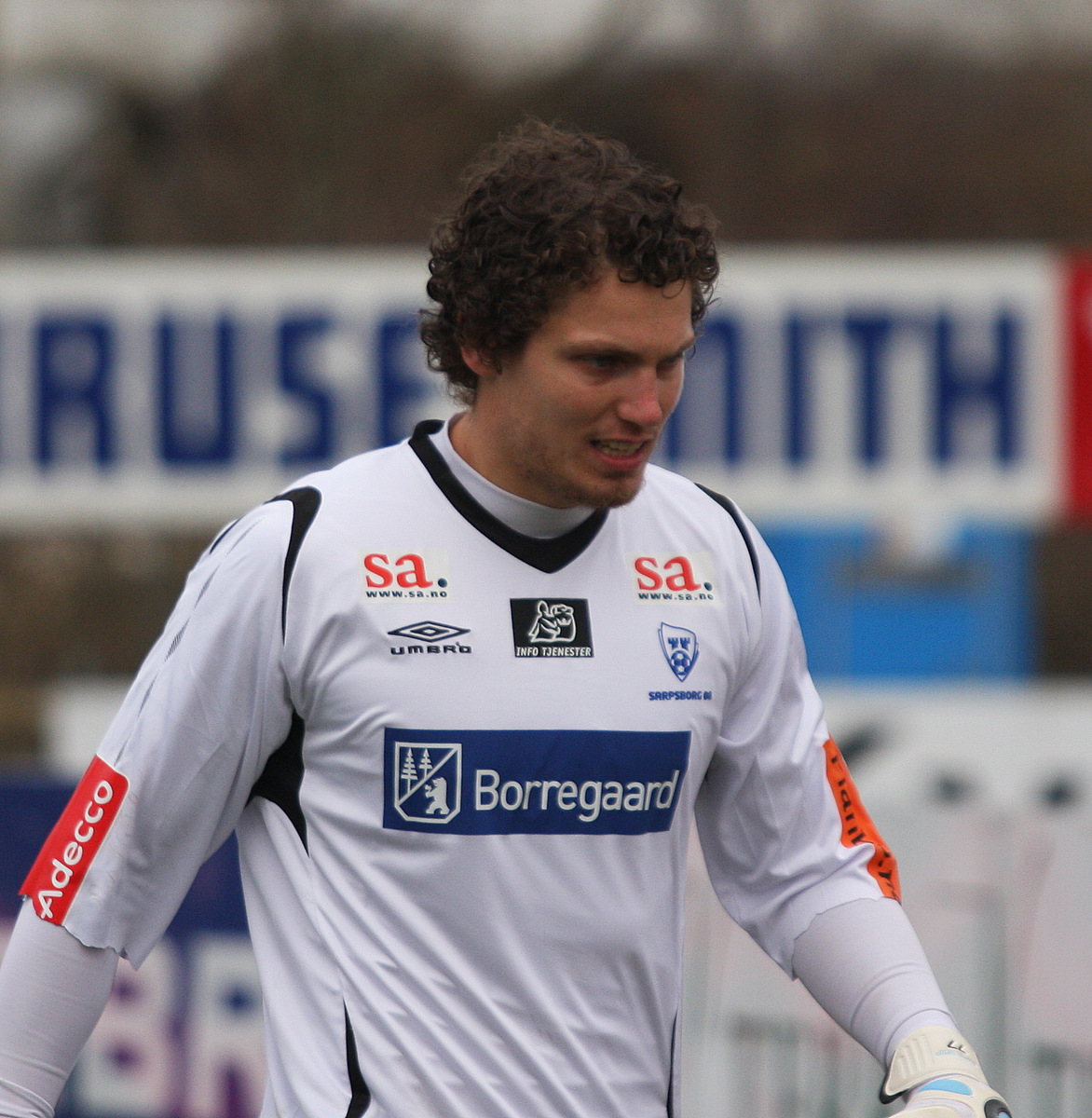
- Joacim Heier

Personal information
- Full name: Joacim Lund Heier
- Date of birth: 27 January 1986 (age 40)
- Position: Goalkeeper

Youth career
- Rakkestad
- Moss

Senior career*
Years	Team	Apps	(Gls)
2005–2006	Moss		
2007–2011	Sarpsborg 08		
2010	→ Sandefjord (loan)	10	(0)
2012–2016	Kvik Halden	128	(0)

International career
2004	Norway U-18	4	(0)
2005	Norway U-19	11	(0)
2007	Norway U-21	2	(0)
- * Club domestic league appearances and goals

Joacim Heier (born 27 January 1986) is a retired Norwegian football goalkeeper.

He hails from Rakkestad. He was capped as a youth and U21 international for Norway, and was a squad member for the 2005 UEFA European Under-19 Championship. Following several years in the 1. divisjon for Moss and Sarpsborg 08, he made his Eliteserien debut in August 2010 for Sandefjord. In 2011 he was mostly first-choice goalkeeper for Sarpsborg 08 in Eliteserien, but left for third-tier Kvik Halden after the season.

After the 2016 season he retired, and became managing director of Fredrikstad FK.
