= Volkan Fındıklı =

Turkish footballer (born 1990)

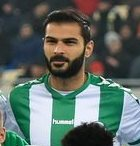

Personal information
- Date of birth: 13 October 1990 (age 36)
- Place of birth: Muğla, Turkey
- Height: 1.86 m (6 ft 1 in)
- Position: Defender

Team information
- Current team: Kepezspor
- Number: 2

Youth career
- 2001–2007: Marmaris Belediye GSK

Senior career*
Years	Team	Apps	(Gls)
2007–2009	Marmaris Belediye GSK	7	(1)
2009–2010	Konyaspor	0	(0)
2010–2012	Çanakkale Dardanel	39	(1)
2012–2014	Anadolu Selçukspor	61	(3)
2014–2021	Konyaspor	96	(3)
2021–2023	Altınordu	51	(3)
2023–2024	Kuşadasıspor	24	(0)
2024–2025	Kepezspor	10	(0)
2025–	Kepezspor	6	(0)
- * Club domestic league appearances and goals as of 26 November 2025

Volkan Fındıklı (born 13 October 1990) is a Turkish professional footballer who plays as a defender for TFF 2. Lig club Kepezspor.

== Career ==
Fındıklı started his career with Marmaris Belediye GSK, and since then has progressed in various levels of the Turkish football pyramid. On 28 May 2014, he signed a three-year contract with Konyaspor. There, he made his European debut in the 2016–17 UEFA Europa League on 29 September 2016, in a 2–0 away loss to Gent.

== Honours ==
Konyaspor

- Turkish Cup: 2016–17
- Turkish Super Cup: 2017
