= Burak Çamoğlu =

Turkish footballer

Personal information
- Full name: Burak Can Çamoğlu
- Date of birth: 5 October 1996 (age 30)
- Place of birth: Kamen, Germany
- Height: 1.73 m (5 ft 8 in)
- Positions: Right back; central midfielder

Team information
- Current team: Şanlıurfaspor
- Number: 2

Youth career
- Borussia Dortmund

Senior career*
Years	Team	Apps	(Gls)
2013–2017	Borussia Dortmund II	59	(1)
2017–2020	Karlsruher SC	66	(3)
2020–2022	Hatayspor	20	(0)
2022–2023	Adanaspor	8	(0)
2023–2024	Rot Weiss Ahlen	20	(1)
2024–	Şanlıurfaspor	33	(0)

International career^{‡}
2012	Turkey U17	3	(1)
2013–2014	Turkey U18	7	(0)
2014–2015	Turkey U19	7	(1)
2015	Turkey U20	3	(0)
- * Club domestic league appearances and goals as of 15 June 2025 ‡ National team caps and goals as of 1 July 2017

Burak Can Çamoğlu (born 5 October 1996) is a Turkish professional footballer who plays for Şanlıurfaspor. He made his debut in the German 3. Liga on 3 February 2015.
