= Ahmethan Köse =

Turkish footballer

Personal information
- Date of birth: 7 January 1997 (age 29)
- Place of birth: Kahramanmaraş, Turkey
- Height: 1.82 m (5 ft 11 1/2 in)
- Position: Midfielder

Team information
- Current team: Kastamonuspor 1966
- Number: 9

Youth career
- 2006–2011: Kurttepe Spor
- 2011–2017: Fenerbahçe

Senior career*
Years	Team	Apps	(Gls)
2017–2019	Fenerbahçe	1	(0)
2018	→ Boluspor (loan)	2	(1)
2018–2019	→ Kırklarelispor (loan)	33	(14)
2019–2021	Samsunspor	27	(4)
2021	→ Adanaspor (loan)	15	(4)
2021–2023	Adanaspor	45	(7)
2023	→ Esenler Erokspor (loan)	3	(1)
2023–2024	Tuzlaspor	16	(1)
2024–2025	Çorum	10	(1)
2025–	Kastamonuspor 1966	18	(1)

International career
2012	Turkey U15	4	(0)
2012–2014	Turkey U16	15	(0)
2014	Turkey U17	3	(0)
2014–2015	Turkey U18	4	(0)
2015	Turkey U19	3	(0)
- * Club domestic league appearances and goals as of 1 October 2026

Ahmethan Köse (born 7 January 1997) is a Turkish professional footballer who plays as a midfielder for TFF 2. Lig club Kastamonuspor 1966.

He is an academy graduate of Fenerbahçe and made his senior debut in July 2017, aged 20. Köse is also a former Turkish youth international and represented his nation from U15 to U19 level.

== Club career ==
=== Fenerbahçe ===
Köse is an academy graduate of Fenerbahçe, having joined in 2011 from Kurttepe Spor, and scored 34 goals in 60 matches at across the various youth levels for the club. He made his senior debut for the club on 27 July 2017, starting in a 2–1 Europa League win over Sturm Graz. He made his Süper Lig debut on 12 August, coming on as a second-half substitute for Robin van Persie in a 2–2 draw with Göztepe. He scored his first goal for the club on 29 November, netting in a 6–0 Turkish Cup win over Adana Demirspor.

==== Loan to Boluspor ====
On 9 January 2018, second-division side Boluspor confirmed the signing of Köse on loan for the remainder of the season.

== Career statistics ==
As of 6 July 2018

Appearances and goals by club, season and competition
Season	Club	Division	League		Cup^{1}		Continental^{2}		Total	
Season	Club	Division	Apps	Goals	Apps	Goals	Apps	Goals	Apps	Goals
2017–18	Fenerbahçe	Süper Lig	1	0	2	1	4	0	7	1
2017–18	Boluspor (loan)	TFF First League	2	1	0	0	0	0	2	1
Career Total			3	1	2	1	4	0	9	2

^{1} Includes Turkish Cup matches.
^{2} Includes UEFA Europa League matches.
