= Aaron Leya Iseka =

Belgian footballer

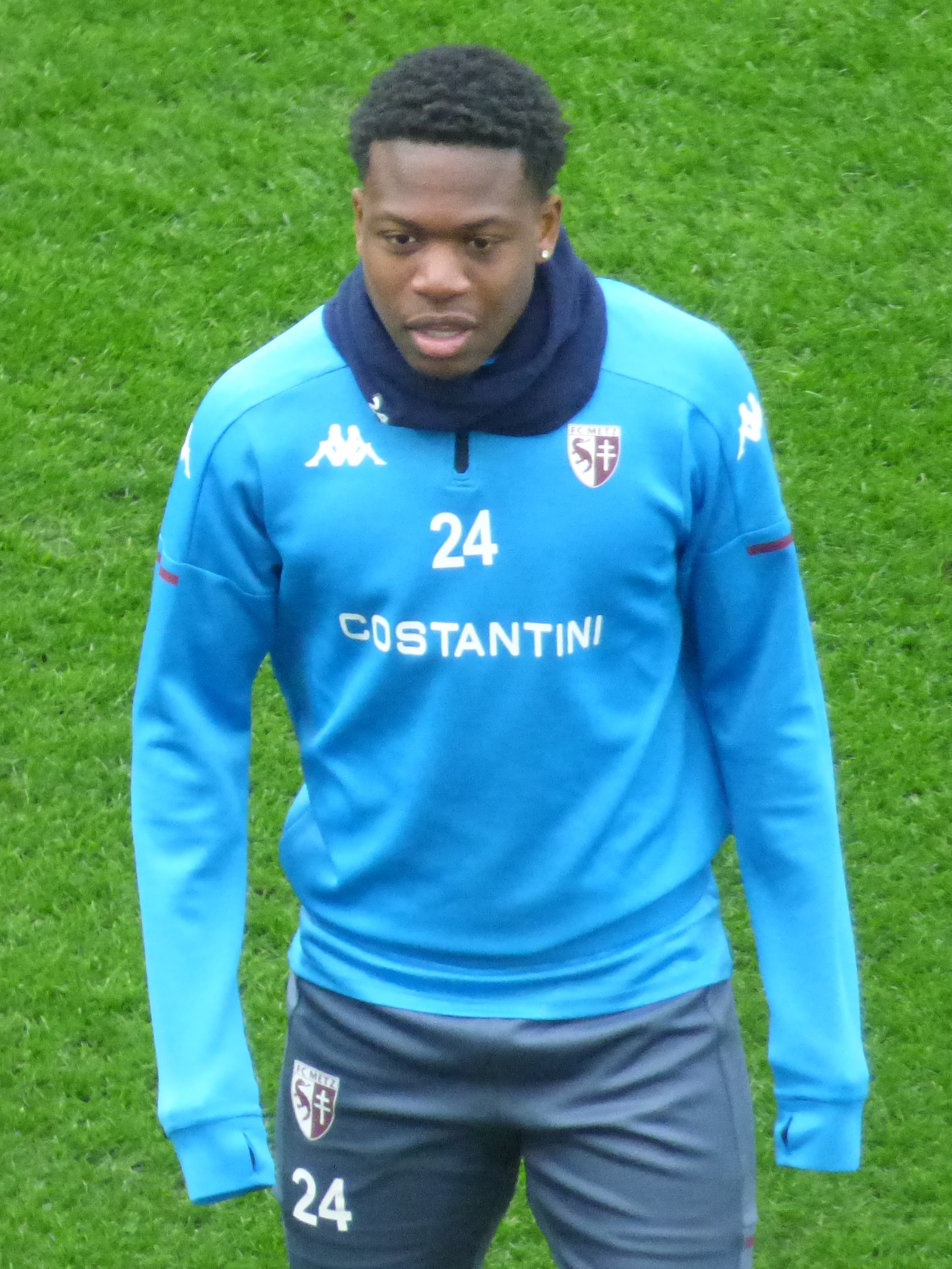
- Leya Iseka with Metz in 2021

Personal information
- Date of birth: 15 November 1997 (age 28)
- Place of birth: Brussels, Belgium
- Height: 1.82 m (6 ft 0 in)
- Position: Striker

Team information
- Current team: OFI
- Number: 9

Youth career
- 2003–2004: RFC Evere
- 2004: Crossing Schaerbeek
- 2004–2014: Anderlecht

Senior career*
Years	Team	Apps	(Gls)
2014–2018	Anderlecht	12	(0)
2016–2017	→ Marseille (loan)	8	(0)
2016–2017	→ Marseille B (loan)	14	(4)
2017–2018	→ Zulte Waregem (loan)	24	(6)
2018–2021	Toulouse	52	(6)
2020	Toulouse B	2	(0)
2020–2021	→ Metz (loan)	21	(4)
2021–2024	Barnsley	25	(3)
2022–2023	→ Adanaspor (loan)	10	(2)
2023	→ Tuzlaspor (loan)	11	(4)
2023–2024	→ Hapoel Hadera (loan)	2	(1)
2024	OFI	16	(5)
2024–2025	CSKA Sofia	20	(0)
2025–	OFI	17	(1)

International career^{‡}
2017–2019	Belgium U21	15	(4)
- * Club domestic league appearances and goals as of 20 September 2026 ‡ National team caps and goals as of 20 June 2019

Aaron Leya Iseka (born 15 November 1997) is a Belgian professional footballer who plays as a striker for Greek Super League club OFI.

He made his professional debut at Anderlecht, and also represented Zulte Waregem in the Belgian Pro League. He featured for several years in the French Ligue 1 with Marseille, Toulouse and Metz, as well as having top-flight spells in Israel and Greece with OFI, and playing second-tier football in England and Turkey.

== Club career ==
=== Anderlecht ===
Leya Iseka is a youth exponent from Anderlecht. In the 2013–14 UEFA Youth League, aged 15 in an under-19 tournament, he scored four goals in six games of a group-stage elimination, including a hat-trick on 3 October in a 4–2 home win over Olympiacos. The following season, he scored nine times in seven UEFA Youth League games, second only to Chelsea's Dominic Solanke. This included another hat-trick on 18 March 2015 in a 5–0 home win over Porto in the quarter-finals. That same month, he was given his first professional contract, for five years.

He made his first team debut on 3 December 2014, in a Belgian Cup 7th-round game against K.R.C. Mechelen, replacing Cyriac after 75 minutes in a 4–1 home win. He scored his first goal on 21 January 2015 in the second leg of the quarter-finals, a 4–2 (7–2 aggregate) win over Zulte Waregem. On 22 March he was an unused substitute in the 2015 Belgian Cup Final, a 2–1 loss to Club Brugge at the King Baudouin Stadium. He made nine appearances that season in the Belgian Pro League, the first being on 18 January when he replaced Andy Najar for the last six minutes of a 3–0 win over Lierse S.K. at the Constant Vanden Stock Stadium.

==== Loans ====
On 23 July 2016, Leya Iseka joined Marseille in Ligue 1 on a season-long loan, a month after his brother Michy Batshuayi had left the club. However, he returned to Belgium at the start of January 2017 to find a new club he could be loaned out to, after Marseille announced they would not keep him; he was expected to join Mouscron but nothing came of it. He did not score in nine total matches for OM, but did feature and score more frequently for the reserves in CFA (fourth tier).

Leya Iseka was loaned to fellow top-flight team Zulte-Waregem for the season on 21 June 2017. On 22 July, he made his debut in the 2017 Belgian Super Cup, a 2–1 loss to his parent club, replacing Nill De Pauw for the final 11 minutes. He scored his first goal in a professional league on 5 August, a penalty in a 2–0 home win over Sint-Truidense. In the club's UEFA Europa League campaign, he scored twice in five matches, including a late winner in a 3–2 victory over Lazio at the Regenboogstadion.

=== Toulouse ===
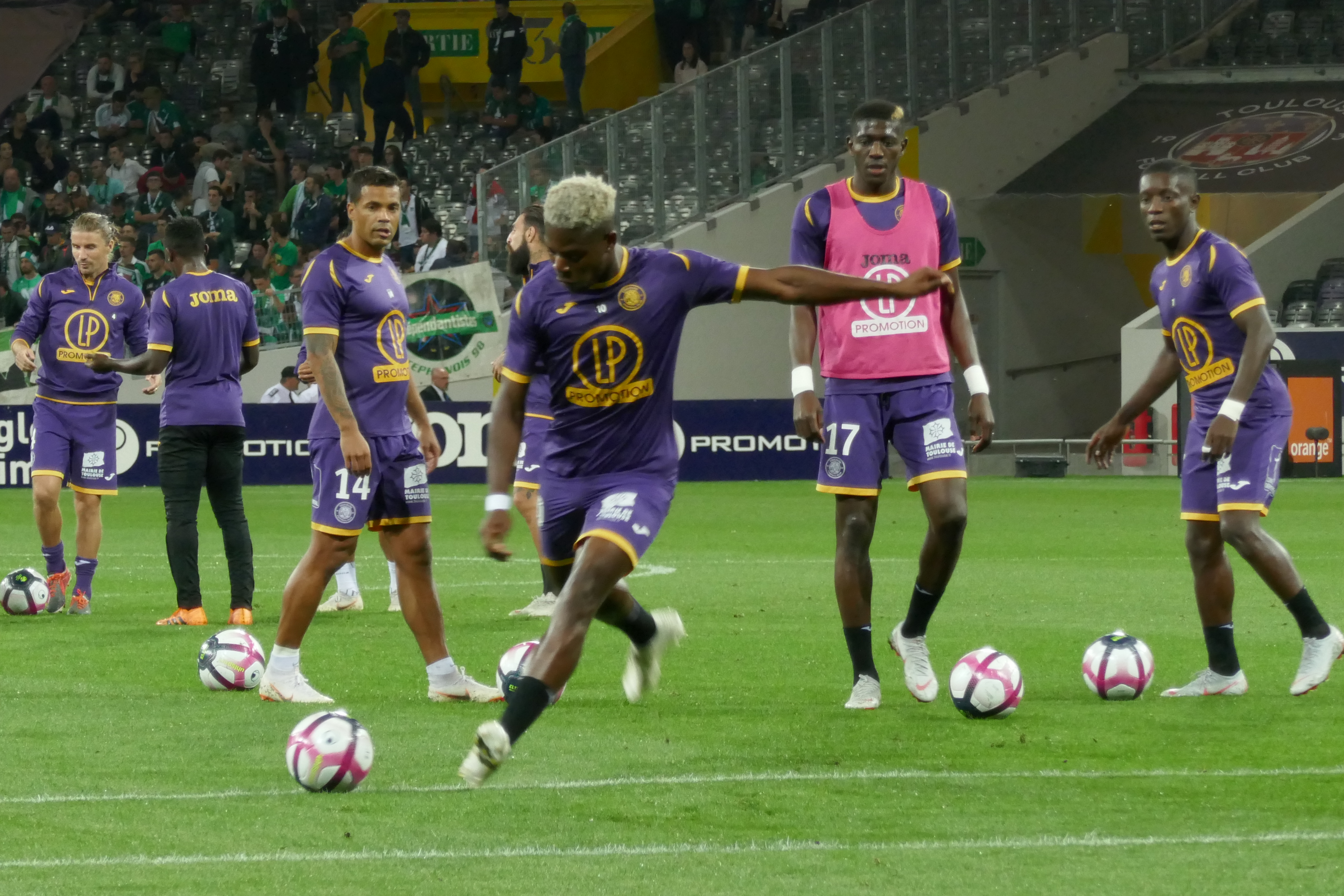
Leya Iseka (front centre) warming-up for Toulouse in 2018

On 29 June 2018, Leya Iseka returned to Ligue 1, joining Toulouse FC for four seasons. He made his debut on 10 August in the season opener away to his former club Marseille, playing the full 90 minutes of a 4–0 loss at the Stade Vélodrome. Nine days later he scored his first goal for the club to open a 2–1 win over Bordeaux at the Stadium de Toulouse. On 30 September, he was sent off in the first half of a 1–1 draw at Rennes for dissent, and suspended for three matches.

On 29 October 2020, Leya Iseka was loaned to fellow top-flight team Metz for the season.

=== Barnsley ===
Leya Iseka signed for EFL Championship club Barnsley on 2 August 2021 on a four-year deal, for an undisclosed fee. He scored three goals in 37 games in his first season, which ended in relegation. Having played only once at the start of the new campaign under manager Michael Duff, who criticised his attitude to training, Leya Iseka joined Adanaspor in the TFF First League on 8 September 2022.

After being loaned to Tuzlaspor in the same league, Leya Iseka signed for Hapoel Hadera F.C. of the Israeli Premier League on 21 September 2023, on a deal with a recall clause for January. Two days later he made his debut and scored a penalty after five minutes, albeit in a 2–1 home loss to Hapoel Haifa. Having already experienced a major earthquake in Turkey at the start of the year, he left Israel after his second match due to the start of the Gaza war.

=== OFI ===
On 29 January 2024, Barnsley used their recall clause for Leya Iseka's loan in Israel to facilitate a permanent transfer to Super League Greece club OFI. He scored on his debut two days later, as a substitute in a 3–1 loss to Panetolikos in the quarter-finals of the Greek Football Cup, and added his first league goals on 19 February as a brace in a 4–0 home win over Panserraikos.

During his stay with OFI, Iseka played in 16 matches, scoring 5 goals.

=== CSKA Sofia ===
In August 2024, he was sold to CSKA Sofia in Bulgaria for over 1 million euros, with the total transfer fee, including bonuses, expected to reach 1.2 million euros. OFI also secured a 10% resale clause as part of the deal.

== Personal life ==
Leya Iseka is the younger brother of Belgian international striker Michy Batshuayi, but bears the surname of their mother rather than their father.

He had Osgood–Schlatter disease when he was 12, forcing a break from football.

== Career statistics ==
As of match played 17 May 2025

Appearances and goals by club, season and competition
Club	Season	League			National Cup (Note: Includes Belgian Cup, Coupe de France, FA Cup and Turkish Cup)		League Cup (Note: Includes Coupe de la Ligue and EFL Cup)		Continental		Other		Total	
Club	Season	Division	Apps	Goals	Apps	Goals	Apps	Goals	Apps	Goals	Apps	Goals	Apps	Goals
Anderlecht	2014–15	Belgian Pro League	9	0	4	1	—		2 (Note: Appearances in UEFA Europa League)	0	0	0	15	1
Anderlecht	2015–16	Belgian Pro League	3	0	1	0	—		0	0	—		4	0
Anderlecht	Total		12	0	5	1	0	0	2	0	0	0	19	1
Marseille (loan)	2016–17	Ligue 1	8	0	0	0	1	0	—		—		9	0
Marseille B (loan)	2016–17	CFA	13	4	—		—		—		—		13	4
Zulte Waregem (loan)	2017–18	Belgian First Division A	24	6	1	1	—		5	2	1 (Note: Appearance in Belgian Super Cup)	0	31	9
Toulouse	2018–19	Ligue 1	28	4	3	2	1	0	—		—		32	6
Toulouse	2019–20	Ligue 1	22	2	0	0	1	0	—		—		23	2
Toulouse	2020–21	Ligue 1	2	0	0	0	1	0	—		—		3	0
Toulouse	Total		52	6	3	2	3	0	0	0	0	0	58	8
Toulouse B	2020–21	Championnat National 3	1	0	—		—		—		—		1	0
Metz (loan)	2020–21	Ligue 1	21	4	3	1	0	0	—		—		24	5
Barnsley	2021–22	EFL Championship	25	3	1	0	0	0	—		—		26	3
Barnsley	2022–23	League One	0	0	0	0	1	0	—		0	0	1	0
Barnsley	2023–24	League One	0	0	0	0	0	0	—		0	0	0	0
Barnsley	Total		25	3	1	0	1	0	0	0	0	0	27	3
Adanaspor (loan)	2022–23	TFF First League	10	2	0	0	—		—		—		10	2
Tuzlaspor (loan)	2022–23	TFF First League	11	4	0	0	—		—		—		11	4
Hapoel Hadera (loan)	2023–24	Israeli Premier League	2	1	—		—		—		—		2	1
OFI	2023–24	Superleague Greece	13	4	1	1	—		—		—		14	5
OFI	2024–25	Superleague Greece	2	0	0	0	—		—		—		2	0
OFI	Total		15	4	1	1	0	0	0	0	0	0	16	5
CSKA Sofia	2024–25	First League	20	0	2	1	—		—		0	0	22	1
CSKA Sofia	2025–26	First League	0	0	0	0	—		—		0	0	0	0
CSKA Sofia	Total		20	0	2	1	0	0	0	0	0	0	22	1
Career total			214	34	16	7	5	0	7	2	1	0	243	43

== Honours ==
OFI

- Greek Cup: 2025–26
- Greek Super Cup: 2026
