= Arthur Stepanyan =

Armenian footballer and referee

Personal information
- Full name: Arthur Kalinovich Stepanyan
- Date of birth: 14 April 1987 (age 39)
- Place of birth: Ordzhonikidze, Russian SFSR
- Height: 1.88 m (6 ft 2 in)
- Position: Defender

Youth career
- Yunost Vladikavkaz

Senior career*
Years	Team	Apps	(Gls)
2004–2005	FC Sokol Saratov	3	(0)
2006	FC Pyunik	19	(1)
2007	FC Saturn Yegoryevsk	1	(0)
2007	FC Spartak-UGP Anapa	6	(0)
2008–2009	FC Amkar Perm	0	(0)
2008	→ FC Chernomorets Novorossiysk (loan)	7	(0)
2009	→ FC Gornyak Uchaly (loan)	14	(3)
2009	→ FC Tyumen (loan)	8	(0)
2010	FC Gazovik Orenburg	4	(1)
2010	FC Neftekhimik Nizhnekamsk	10	(0)
2012–2014	FC Astrakhan	30	(1)

International career
2006–2008	Armenia U-21	9	(0)
- * Club domestic league appearances and goals

Arthur Kalinovich Stepanyan (Armenian: Արթուր Ստեփանյան, Russian: Артур Калинович Степанян, born on 14 April 1987) is a former Armenian football defender and a referee. He was born in Russia, holds Russian citizenship and played most of his career there.

== Club career ==
He played 3 seasons in the Russian Football National League for FC Sokol Saratov and FC Chernomorets Novorossiysk.

== Referee career ==
Upon retirement as a player, he worked as a referee in the third-tier Russian Professional Football League from 2015 to 2017.
