= Emircan Gürlük =

Turkish footballer

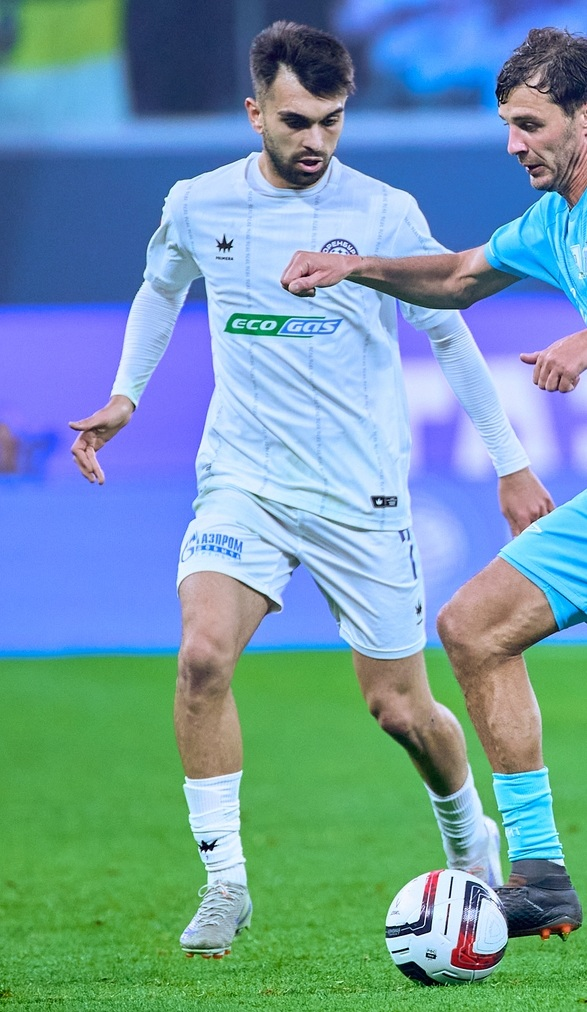
- Gürlük with Orenburg in 2025

Personal information
- Date of birth: 15 October 2003 (age 23)
- Place of birth: Bingöl, Turkey
- Height: 1.80 m (5 ft 11 in)
- Position: Left winger

Team information
- Current team: Çorum

Youth career
- –2019: Galatasaray
- 2019: Selimiye
- 2019–2021: Altınordu

Senior career*
Years	Team	Apps	(Gls)
2021–2023	Altınordu	58	(7)
2023–2026	Orenburg	62	(6)
2026–	Çorum	0	(0)

International career^{‡}
2023–2024	Turkey U-21	9	(0)
- * Club domestic league appearances and goals as of 10 May 2026 ‡ National team caps and goals as of 11 October 2024

Emircan Gürlük (born 15 October 2003) is a Turkish football player who plays as a left winger for Süper Lig club Çorum.

== Career ==
On 6 June 2023, Gürlük signed a contract with the Russian Premier League club Orenburg.

Gürlük made his debut for Orenburg on 26 July 2023 in a Russian Cup game against CSKA Moscow. He made his Russian Premier League debut four days later against Rubin Kazan. He left Orenburg as his contract expired in June 2026.

On 8 July 2026, Gürlük returned to Turkey and signed with Çorum.

== Career statistics ==
As of match played 10 May 2026

Appearances and goals by club, season and competition
Club	Season	League			National cup (Note: Includes Turkish Cup, Russian Cup)		Total	
Club	Season	Division	Apps	Goals	Apps	Goals	Apps	Goals
Altınordu	2020–21	TFF First League	1	0	—		1	0
Altınordu	2021–22	TFF First League	28	3	2	0	30	3
Altınordu	2022–23	TFF First League	29	4	1	0	30	4
Altınordu	Total		58	7	3	0	61	7
Orenburg	2023–24	Russian Premier League	15	0	9	1	24	1
Orenburg	2024–25	Russian Premier League	23	2	5	0	28	2
Orenburg	2025–26	Russian Premier League	24	4	4	0	28	4
Orenburg	Total		62	6	18	1	80	7
Career total			120	13	21	1	141	14
