= Şeref Özcan =

German footballer

Personal information
- Date of birth: 8 June 1996 (age 30)
- Place of birth: Nordenham, Germany
- Height: 1.66 m (5 ft 5 in)
- Position: Midfielder

Youth career
- 1. FC Nordenham
- –2010: TSV Abbehausen
- 2010–2014: Hamburger SV
- 2014–2015: Hansa Rostock

Senior career*
Years	Team	Apps	(Gls)
2015–2016	Hansa Rostock II	24	(14)
2016–2017	Fortuna Düsseldorf II	4	(0)
2017–2019	Berliner AK 07	76	(9)
2019–2020	Preußen Münster	32	(2)
2020–2021	Menemenspor	13	(1)
2021–2023	Altınordu	55	(5)
2023	Boluspor	4	(0)
2024	Karşıyaka	7	(0)
2024–2025	VSG Altglienicke	6	(0)
2025	İstanbulspor	12	(1)
2025–2026	Serikspor	24	(1)
- * Club domestic league appearances and goals as of 7 May 2026

Şeref Özcan (born 8 June 1996) is a German professional footballer who plays as a midfielder.

== Career ==
Özcan made his professional debut for Preußen Münster in the 3. Liga on 19 July 2019, starting in the away match against 1860 Munich before being substituted out in the 68th minute for Luca Schnellbacher, which finished as a 1–1 draw.
