= Emirhan Aydoğan =

Turkish footballer (born 1997)

Personal information
- Date of birth: 26 June 1997 (age 29)
- Place of birth: Osmangazi, Turkey
- Height: 1.78 m (5 ft 10 in)
- Position: Midfielder

Team information
- Current team: Batman Petrolspor
- Number: 8

Youth career
- 2009–2015: Bursaspor

Senior career*
Years	Team	Apps	(Gls)
2015–2022	Bursaspor	66	(10)
2016	→ Bandırmaspor (loan)	6	(0)
2017	→ Yeşil Bursa SK (loan)	14	(0)
2017–2019	→ İnegölspor (loan)	59	(4)
2022	Alanyaspor	2	(0)
2022–2023	Sakaryaspor	16	(1)
2023	Altınordu	15	(0)
2023–2024	Bandırmaspor	22	(3)
2024–2025	Sarıyer	31	(4)
2025–	Batman Petrolspor	13	(2)

International career
2013	Turkey U16	18	(1)
2013–2014	Turkey U17	16	(0)
2014–2015	Turkey U18	8	(0)
- * Club domestic league appearances and goals as of 30 November 2025

Emirhan Aydoğan (born 26 June 1997) is a Turkish footballer who plays as a midfielder for TFF 1. Lig club Batman Petrolspor.

== Club career ==
He made his professional debut in the Süper Lig for Bursaspor on 7 May 2016 in a game against Osmanlıspor.

== International ==
He participated in the 2014 UEFA European Under-17 Championship with the Turkey national under-17 football team.
