= Ahmet İlhan Özek =

Turkish footballer

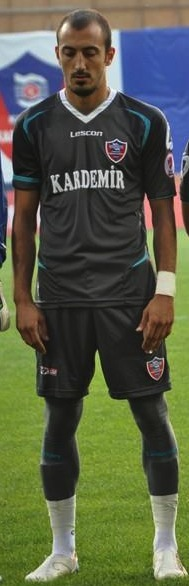

Personal information
- Date of birth: 1 January 1988 (age 38)
- Place of birth: Aydın, Turkey
- Height: 1.83 m (6 ft 0 in)
- Position: Winger

Team information
- Current team: Aliağa FK
- Number: 9

Youth career
- 2001–2006: Aydınspor
- 2006–2008: Anadolu University

Senior career*
| Years | Team | Apps | (Gls) |
| 2008–2010 | Bozüyükspor | 61 | (19) |
| 2010–2012 | Manisaspor | 34 | (3) |
| 2012–2015 | Karabükspor | 73 | (11) |
| 2015–2017 | Çaykur Rizespor | 51 | (4) |
| 2017–2019 | Gençlerbirliği | 40 | (4) |
| 2019–2020 | Giresunspor | 27 | (3) |
| 2020–2023 | Altınordu | 92 | (32) |
| 2023–2024 | Çorum | 30 | (3) |
| 2024–2025 | Bursaspor | 29 | (10) |
| 2025– | Aliağa FK | 13 | (3) |

International career
| 2011–202 | Turkey A2 | 3 | (0) |
| 2013–2014 | Turkey | 5 | (2) |
- * Club domestic league appearances and goals as of 29 November 2025

Ahmet İlhan Özek (born 1 January 1988) is a Turkish footballer who plays as a winger for TFF 2. Lig club Aliağa FK.

== International ==
Ahmet İlhan Özek scored his first two international goals four days apart. He opened the scoring in a 6–1 win over Kosovo, before opening accounts in Turkey's next match, a 2–1 away win over the Republic of Ireland.

Scores and results table. Turkey's goal tally first:

International goals
| # | Date | Venue | Opponent | Score | Result | Competition |
|---|---|---|---|---|---|---|
| 1. | 21 May 2014 | Adem Jashari Olympic Stadium, Mitrovica, Kosovo | Kosovo | 1–0 | 6–1 | Friendly |
| 2. | 25 May 2014 | Aviva Stadium, Dublin, Ireland | Republic of Ireland | 1–0 | 2–1 | Friendly |
