= Dag Ole Thomassen =

Norwegian footballer (born 1986)

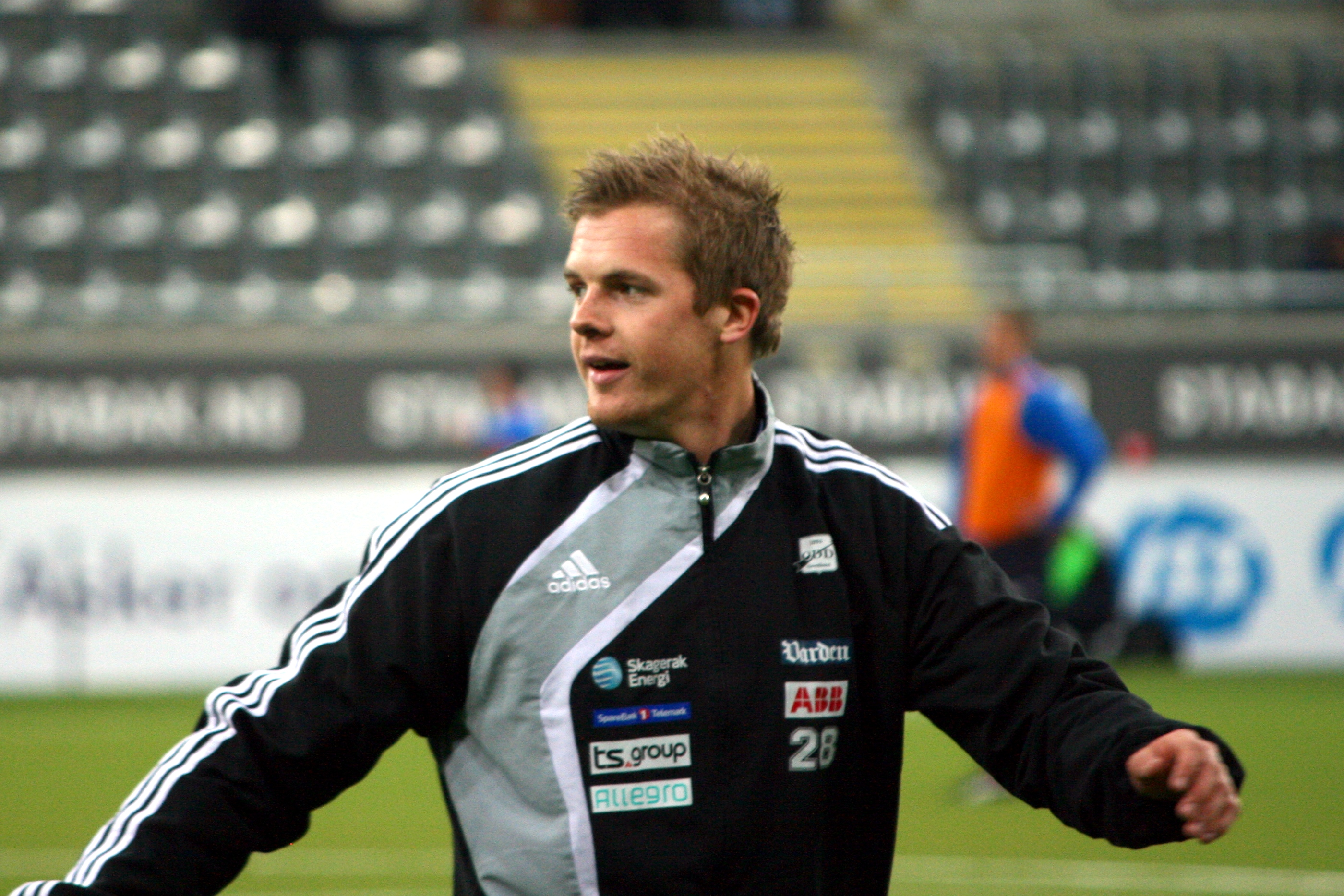

Personal information
- Full name: Dag Ole Høvring Thomassen
- Date of birth: 28 August 1986 (age 40)
- Place of birth: Skien, Norway
- Height: 1.88 m (6 ft 2 in)
- Position: Goalkeeper

Youth career
- Herkules
- Pors Grenland

Senior career*
Years	Team	Apps	(Gls)
2003–2007	Pors Grenland	39	(0)
2008–2010	Odd Grenland	5	(0)
2011–2012	Pors Grenland		

International career^{‡}
	Norway U16	6	(0)
	Norway U17	8	(0)
	Norway U18	6	(0)
	Norway U19	1	(0)
- * Club domestic league appearances and goals as of 20 May 2009 ‡ National team caps and goals as of 20 May 2009

Dag Ole Thomassen (born 28 June 1986) is a retired Norwegian football goalkeeper. He started and ended his senior career in Pors Grenland, intermittently playing first-tier football for Odd Grenland.
