= Bornova Aziz Kocaoğlu Stadium =

Association football stadium in İzmir, Turkey

Coordinates: 38°26′49″N 27°15′44″E

- Bornova Stadium
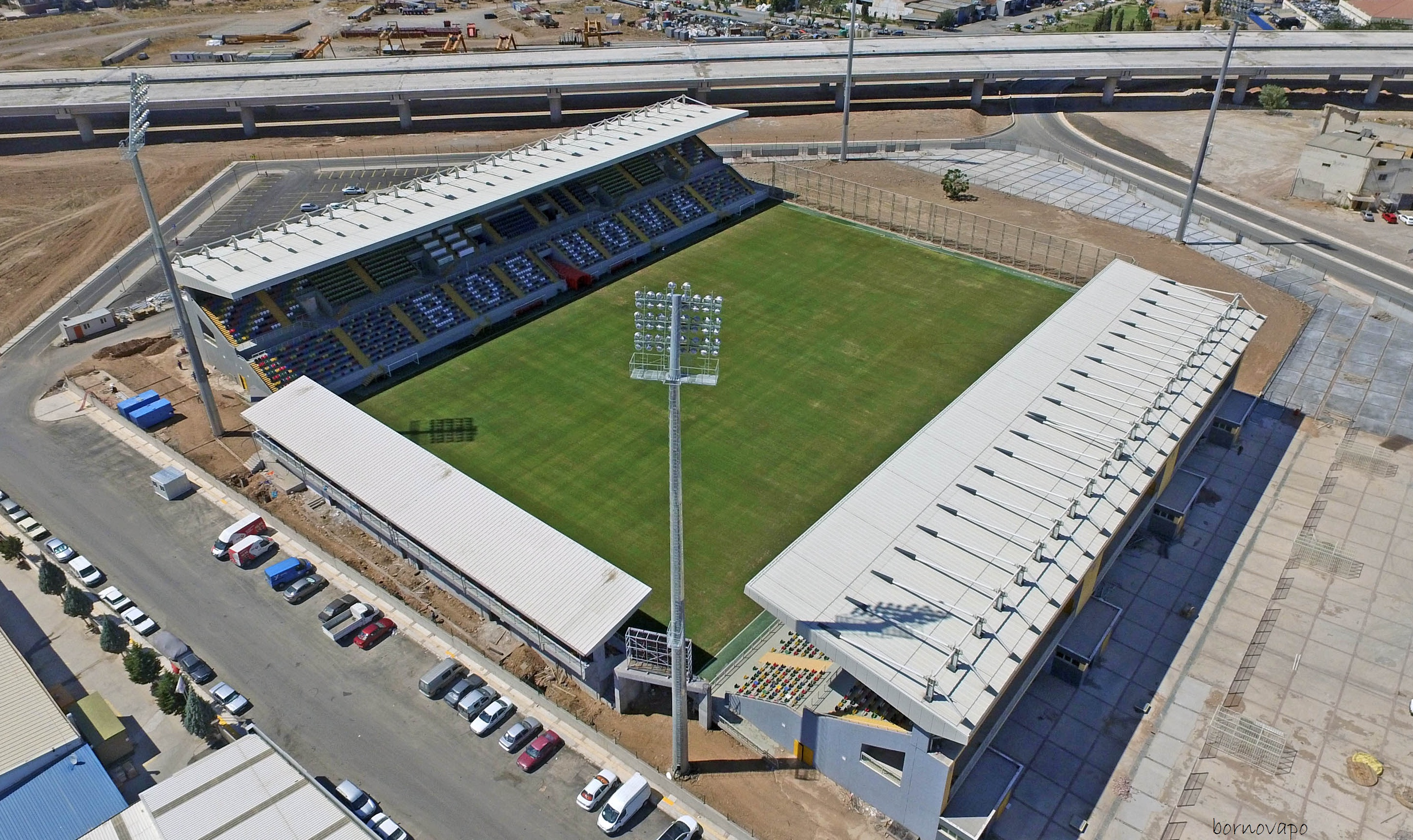
- Interactive map of Bornova Aziz Kocaoğlu Stadium
- Former names: Doğanlar Stadium; Bornova Stadium
- Location: İzmir, Turkey
- Operator: Bornova Municipality
- Capacity: 9,138–12,500
- Surface: Real Grass

Construction
- Groundbreaking: 2013
- Opened: 8 October 2016

Tenants
- Altınordu (2016–2021); Altay (2019–2021); Göztepe (2016–2019); Karşıyaka (2021–present)

Bornova Aziz Kocaoğlu Stadium (Turkish: Bornova Aziz Kocaoğlu Stadyumu) is a stadium in the Bornova district of İzmir, Turkey. It was opened to public in 2016 with a capacity of 9,138 spectators. It currently serves as the home venue for football club Karşıyaka.

== History ==
Doğanlar Stadium was inaugurated on 1 October 2016, with a match between Göztepe S.K. and Elazığspor. After the official opening on 8 October 2016, the name was changed from "Doğanlar Stadı" to "Bornova Aziz Kocaoğlu Stadı".
