= Kubilay Aktaş =

Turkish footballer (born 1995)

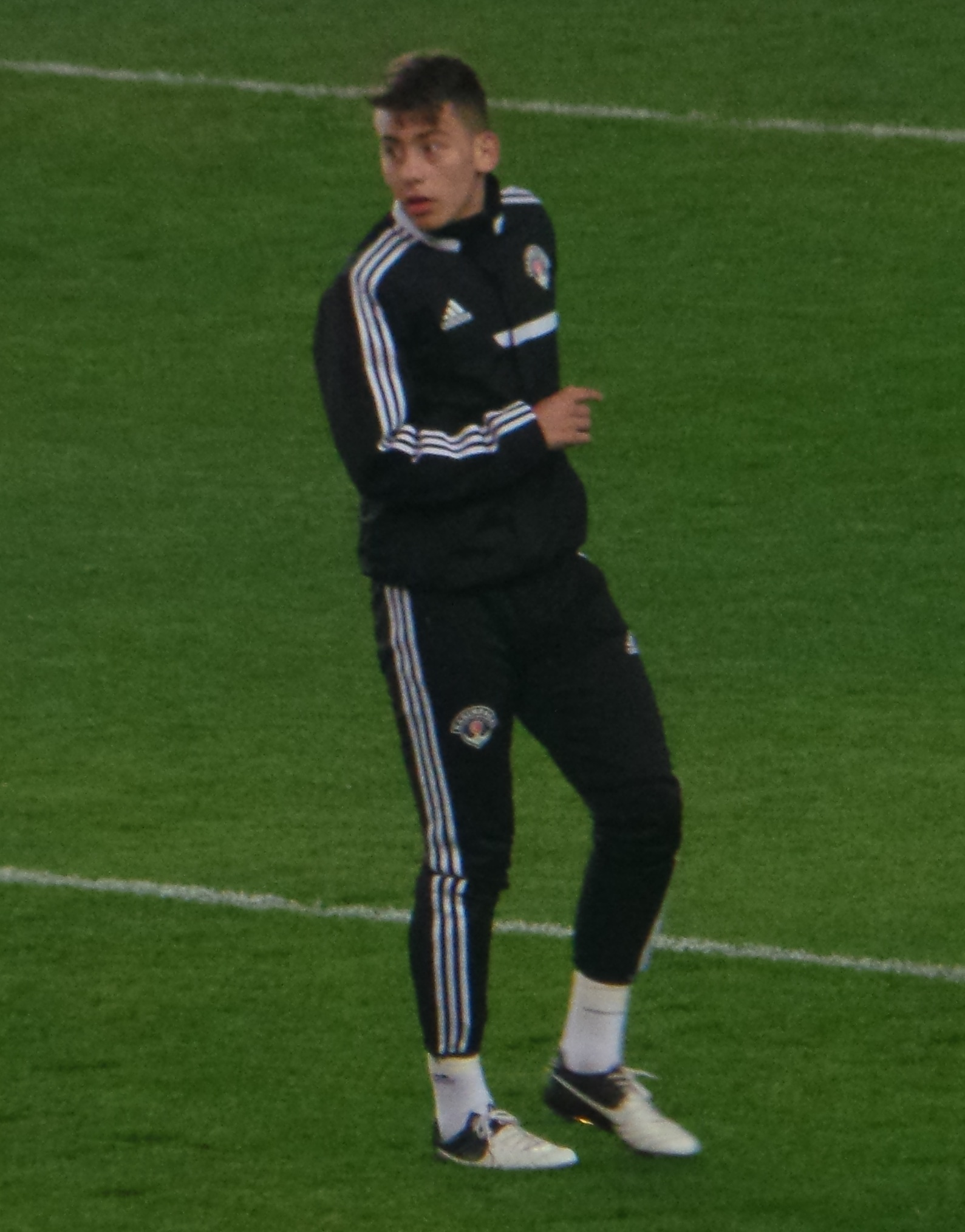
- Aktaş in 2014

Personal information
- Date of birth: 29 January 1995 (age 31)
- Place of birth: Saint-Priest, France
- Height: 1.82 m (6 ft 0 in)
- Position: Midfielder

Youth career
- Saint-Étienne

Senior career*
Years	Team	Apps	(Gls)
2013–2015	Kasımpaşa	9	(0)
2015–2016	Boluspor	4	(0)
2016–2018	İstanbulspor	59	(1)
2018–2021	Gaziantep	30	(1)
2021	Denizlispor	14	(0)
2021–2022	Manisa	14	(0)
2022–2023	Altınordu	42	(1)
2023–2024	Adanaspor	26	(0)
2024–2026	Ümraniyespor	14	(1)

International career
2013	Turkey U19	4	(0)
2015	Turkey U20	1	(0)
- * Club domestic league appearances and goals as of 6 May 2026

Kubilay Aktaş (born 29 January 1995) is a Turkish footballer who plays as a midfielder.

== Club career ==
He made his Süper Lig debut on 6 October 2013.

== International career ==
Aktaş represented Turkish national under-19 team at the 2013 Mediterranean Games.
