= Kay Thomassen =

Dutch footballer (born 1987)

Personal information
- Full name: Kay Thomassen
- Date of birth: 6 March 1987 (age 39)
- Place of birth: Nijmegen, Netherlands
- Position: Right-back

Youth career
- VV Ewijk
- 1999–2006: Quick 1888

Senior career*
Years	Team	Apps	(Gls)
2006–2009	Quick 1888	?	(6)
2009–2011	Juliana '31	?	(7)
2011–2013	Quick 1888	?	(?)
2011–2014	Achilles '29	10	(0)
2014–2018	Quick 1888	?	(?)
- * Club domestic league appearances and goals

Kay Thomassen (born 3 June 1987) is a Dutch former footballer who played as a right-back.

He most notably had a stint at Achilles '29 in the Dutch Eerste Divisie in the 2013–14 season. He also played first team football for Quick 1888 and Juliana '31.
