= Emre Kaplan =

Turkish footballer (born 2001)

Personal information
- Date of birth: 12 January 2001 (age 25)
- Place of birth: Elmadağ, Turkey
- Height: 1.80 m (5 ft 11 in)
- Position: Left-back

Team information
- Current team: Bodrumspor
- Number: 75

Youth career
- 2013–2014: Elmadağ Belediyesi
- 2014–2018: Ankaragücü
- 2018–2020: İstanbul Başakşehir

Senior career*
Years	Team	Apps	(Gls)
2020–2026	İstanbul Başakşehir	4	(0)
2021	→ Bodrumspor (loan)	14	(0)
2022	→ Hatayspor (loan)	5	(0)
2022–2023	→ Adanaspor (loan)	22	(0)
2023	→ Bandırmaspor (loan)	11	(0)
2023–2024	→ Ümraniyespor (loan)	23	(1)
2025–2026	→ Ümraniyespor (loan)	41	(2)
2026–	Bodrumspor	10	(0)

International career^{‡}
2019	Azerbaijan U19	3	(0)
2020	Azerbaijan U21	3	(0)
2022	Turkey U21	2	(0)
- * Club domestic league appearances and goals as of 17 October 2026 ‡ National team caps and goals as of 9 February 2026

Emre Kaplan (born 12 January 2001) is a Turkish professional footballer who plays as a left-back for TFF 1. Lig club Bodrumspor. Born in Turkey, he has represented Azerbaijan at youth international level (U-19), and later at the U-21 level before switching to representing Turkey in the U-21 team.

== Club career ==
Kaplan made his professional debut with İstanbul Başakşehir in a 5–1 UEFA Champions League loss against Paris Saint-Germain on 9 September 2020.

On 13 November 2025, Kaplan was banned from playing for 45 days for his involvement in the 2025 Turkish football betting scandal.

== International career ==
Born in Turkey, Kaplan is a youth international for Azerbaijan.
