= 2020–21 Hatayspor season =

Hatayspor
2020–21 season
- Chairman: Nihat Tazeaslan
- Manager: Ömer Erdoğan
- Stadium: Antakya Atatürk Stadium
- Süper Lig: 6th
- Turkish Cup: Fourth round
- Top goalscorer: League: Aaron Boupendza (18); All: Aaron Boupendza (18)
Home colours	Away colours	Third colours

The 2020–21 season was Hatayspor's 54th season in existence and the club's first ever season in the top flight of Turkish football. In addition to the domestic league, Hatayspor participated in this season's edition of the Turkish Cup. The season covered the period from July 2020 to 30 June 2021.

== Players ==
As of 28 September 2020

Note: Flags indicate national team as defined under FIFA eligibility rules; some limited exceptions apply. Players may hold more than one non-FIFA nationality.

No.	Pos.	Nation	Player
1	GK	MAR	Munir
2	MF	TUR	Burak Çamoğlu
3	DF	GRE	Alexandros Katranis (on loan from Saint-Étienne)
4	DF	TUR	Soner Örnek
5	MF	GHA	Isaac Sackey
6	DF	FRA	Jean-Claude Billong
8	MF	FRA	Rayane Aabid
9	FW	GAB	Aaron Boupendza
10	MF	FRA	Selim Ilgaz
14	DF	BRA	Pablo (on loan from Braga)
16	DF	TUR	Mesut Çaytemel
17	MF	NGR	Babajide David

No.	Pos.	Nation	Player
19	MF	BEL	Muhammed Mert
23	MF	TUR	Abdurrahman Canlı
28	MF	MLI	Adama Traoré
30	FW	LBR	Mohammed Kamara
33	GK	TUR	Yavuz Buğra Boyar
34	GK	TUR	Akın Alkan
41	MF	GHA	Joseph Akomadi
55	DF	TUR	Yusuf Abdioğlu
88	MF	POR	Rúben Ribeiro
90	DF	BUL	Strahil Popov
92	FW	SEN	Mame Biram Diouf

=== Out on loan ===
Note: Flags indicate national team as defined under FIFA eligibility rules; some limited exceptions apply. Players may hold more than one non-FIFA nationality.

No.	Pos.	Nation	Player
—	DF	TUR	Abdurrahman Canlı (on loan to 24 Erzincanspor)

== Transfers ==
=== In ===
Position	Player	Transferred from	Date	Fee	Source
FW	(Senegal) Mame Biram Diouf	(England) Stoke City	20 July 2020	Free	
FW	(Gabon) Aaron Boupendza	(France) Bordeaux	6 August 2020	Undisclosed	
DF	(Greece) Alexandros Katranis	(France) Saint-Étienne	27 August 2020	Loan	
DF	(Brazil) Pablo	(Portugal) Braga	19 August 2020	Loan	
GK	(Morocco) Munir Mohamedi	(Spain) Málaga	4 September 2020	Free	
MF	(Mali) Adama Traoré	(France) Monaco	11 September 2020	Undisclosed	
MF	(Nigeria) Babajide David	(Denmark) FC Midtjylland	28 September 2020	Loan	
FW	(Liberia) Mohammed Kamara	(Turkey) Menemenspor	8 January 2021	Undisclosed	
DF	(Mali) Youssouf Koné	(France) Lyon	1 February 2021	Loan	

=== Out ===
Position	Player	Transferred to	Date	Fee	Source
GK	(Turkey) Süleyman Çamlıca	(Turkey) Altındağspor	9 September 2020	Free	
MF	(Algeria) Idir Ouali	(Cyprus) Ethnikos	8 January 2021	Free	
FW	(Senegal) Dame Diop	(Czech Republic) Dynamo České Budějovice	18 January 2021	Free	

== Pre-season and friendlies ==
Win Draw Loss Fixtures

== Competitions ==
=== Overview ===
Competition	First match	Last match	Starting round	Final position	Record							
Competition	First match	Last match	Starting round	Final position	Pld	W	D	L	GF	GA	GD	Win %
Süper Lig	14 September 2020	15 May 2021	Matchday 1	6th	40	17	10	13	62	53	+9	42.50
Turkish Cup	5 November 2020	25 November 2020	Third round	Fourth round	2	1	1	0	4	3	+1	50.00
Total					42	18	11	13	66	56	+10	42.86

Source: Soccerway

=== Süper Lig ===
==== League table ====
Pos	Team	Pld	W	D	L	GF	GA	GD	Pts	Qualification or relegation
4	Trabzonspor	40	19	14	7	50	37	+13	71	Qualification for the Europa Conference League third qualifying round
5	Sivasspor	40	16	17	7	54	43	+11	65	Qualification for the Europa Conference League second qualifying round
6	Hatayspor	40	17	10	13	62	53	+9	61	
7	Alanyaspor	40	17	9	14	58	45	+13	60	
8	Fatih Karagümrük	40	16	12	12	64	52	+12	60	

Source: Süper Lig, Soccerway
Rules for classification: 1) Points; 2) Head-to-head points; 3) Head-to-head goal difference; 4) Head-to-head goals scored; 5) Goal difference; 6) Goals scored; 7) Play-off.

==== Results summary ====
Overall								Home						Away					
Pld	W	D	L	GF	GA	GD	Pts	W	D	L	GF	GA	GD	W	D	L	GF	GA	GD
40	17	10	13	62	53	+9	61	10	4	6	35	23	+12	7	6	7	27	30	−3

Source: Süper Lig

==== Results by round ====
Round	1	2	3	4	5	6	7	8	9	10	11	12	13	14	15	16	17	18	19	20	21	22	23	24	25	26	27	28	29	30	31	32	33	34	35	36	37	38	39	40	41	42
Ground	H	A	H	A	H	A	H	A	H	B	A	H	A	H	A	H	A	H	A	H	A	A	H	A	H	A	H	A	H	A	B	H	A	H	A	H	A	H	A	H	A	H
Result	W	D	W	L	W	L	D	W	D	B	L	W	W	L	W	W	L	D	W	L	D	W	L	W	D	W	W	D	L	L	B	W	L	L	D	W	D	W	L	W	D	L
Position	7	7	5	7	3	4	7	4	4	8	11	8	6	6	6	6	6	6	5	6	7	7	7	6	6	6	5	5	6	6	7	6	7	7	7	6	6	5	7	5	6	6

Updated to match(es) played on 14 March 2021. Source: TFF.org
A = Away; H = Home; B = Bye; W = Win; D = Draw; L = Loss

Note: Since the league has been expanded to 21 teams each team will earn a bye twice this season.

==== Matches ====
14 September 2020 1	Hatayspor	2–0	İstanbul Başakşehir	Antakya
20:00 TRT (UTC+3)	Ilgaz 36'; Ribeiro (yellow card) 89'; Barbosa 90+1'	Report	Caiçara (yellow card) 29'; Škrtel (yellow card) 54'	Stadium: Hatay New Stadium; Attendance: 0 Referee: Mete Kalkavan

21 September 2020 2	Fenerbahçe	0–0	Hatayspor	Istanbul
20:00 TRT (UTC+3)	Valencia 26'	Report	Pablo (yellow card) 9'; Rúben Ribeiro (yellow card) 19' (yellow-red card) 73'; Sackey (yellow card) 56' (yellow-red card) 81'; Abdioğlu (yellow card) 82'	Stadium: Şükrü Saracoğlu Stadium; Attendance: 0 Referee: Ümit Öztürk

26 September 2020 3	Hatayspor	1–0	Kasımpaşa	Antakya
17:00 TRT (UTC+3)	Çaytemel (yellow card) 45+2'; Diouf (yellow card) 50' (goal) 57'	Report	Kara (yellow card) 36'; Serbest (yellow card) 74'; Oğuz (yellow card) 90+6'	Stadium: Hatay New Stadium; Attendance: 0 Referee: Hüseyin Göçek

4 October 2020 4	Alanyaspor	6–0	Hatayspor	Alanya
17:00 TRT (UTC+3)	Bakasetas 18'; Davidson 23' 67' 77'; Bareiro 34'; Karaca (yellow card) 36'; Uçan (yellow card) 39'; Moubandje 45+2'	Report	Aabid (yellow card) 40'; Pablo (yellow card) 49'; Akintola (yellow card) 57'	Stadium: Bahçeşehir Okulları Stadium; Attendance: 0 Referee: Atilla Karaoğlan

2 November 2020 7	Hatayspor	1–1	Sivasspor	Antakya
20:00 TRT (UTC+3)	David 8'; Ribeiro (yellow card) 65' (yellow-red card) 82'	Report	Gradel 6'	Stadium: Hatay New Stadium; Attendance: 0 Referee: Yasin Kol

8 November 2020 8	Kayserispor	0–1	Hatayspor	Kayseri
16:00 TRT (UTC+3)	Henrique (yellow card) 44' (yellow-red card) 54'; Ackah (yellow card) 66'; Kolovetsios (yellow card) 71'	Report	Sackey (yellow card) 7'; Diouf 64'; Aabid (yellow card) 79'	Stadium: Kadir Has Stadium; Attendance: 0 Referee: Volkan Bayarslan

22 November 2020 9	Hatayspor	2–2	Çaykur Rizespor	Antakya
13:30 TRT (UTC+3)	Aabid 35'; Boupendza 90+7'	Report	Diouf 12' (o.g.); Boldrin 64'	Stadium: Hatay New Stadium; Attendance: 0 Referee: Halis Özkahya

10	BYE

5 December 2020 11	Galatasaray	3–0	Hatayspor	Istanbul
19:00 TRT (UTC+3)	Diagne (yellow card) 9' (goal) 32'; Marcão (yellow card) 59'; Pablo 64' (o.g.); Emre Taşdemir (yellow card) 69'; Kerem 90'	Report	Gökhan (yellow card) 74' (yellow-red card) 80'	Stadium: Türk Telekom Stadium; Attendance: 0 Referee: Erkan Özdamar

9 December 2020 5	Hatayspor	3–0	BB Erzurumspor	Antakya
19:30 TRT (UTC+3)	Diouf 40'; Çelik 47' (o.g.); David 58'	Report		Stadium: Hatay New Stadium; Attendance: 0 Referee: Sarper Baris Saka
Note: Match was postponed due to COVID-19.

12 December 2020 12	Hatayspor	3–1	Fatih Karagümrük	Antakya
13:30 TRT (UTC+3)	Ilgaz 11'; Boupendza 75', 83'	Report	Durmaz 65'; Ndiaye (yellow card) 84' (yellow-red card) 86'; Sabo (yellow card) 76' (yellow-red card) 90+2'	Stadium: Hatay New Stadium; Attendance: 0 Referee: Tugay Kaan Numanoğlu

15 December 2020 6	Ankaragücü	2–0	Hatayspor	Ankara
16:00 TRT (UTC+3)	Šarlija 69'; Paintsil 89'	Report	Karadeniz (red card) 50'	Stadium: Eryaman Stadium; Attendance: 0 Referee: Hüseyin Göçek
Note: Match was postponed due to COVID-19.

19 December 2020 13	Göztepe	0–1	Hatayspor	İzmir
13:30 TRT (UTC+3)		Report	Diouf 59' (pen.)	Stadium: Gürsel Aksel Stadium; Attendance: 0 Referee: Volkan Bayarslan

22 December 2020 14	Hatayspor	0–1	Trabzonspor	Antakya
16:00 TRT (UTC+3)	Munir (yellow card) 65'	Report	Vitor Hugo 74'; Edgar Ié (yellow card) 90+4'	Stadium: Antakya Atatürk Stadium; Referee: Abdulkadir Bitigen

29 December 2020 15	Antalyaspor	0–6	Hatayspor	Antalya
19:00 TRT (UTC+3)	Özmert (yellow card) 5'; Orgill (yellow card) 26'; Fredy (yellow card) 38'; Naldo (yellow card) 52'; Kudryashov (yellow card) 62'; Şahin (yellow card) 69'	Report	8', 17', 22', 45+2' Boupendza; 35' Akintola; (yellow card) 53' Katranis; (yellow card) 61' Traoré; (yellow card) 74' Çaytemel; 90' Aydın	Stadium: New Antalya Stadium; Attendance: 0 Referee: Ramazan Keleş

2 January 2021 16	Hatayspor	2–1	Konyaspor	Hatay
19:00 TRT (UTC+3)	Boupendza 43', 68'	Report	Kravets 33'	Stadium: Antakya Atatürk Stadium; Attendance: 0 Referee: Alper Ulusoy

6 January 2021 17	Gençlerbirliği	3–1	Hatayspor	Ankara
16:00	Da Motta 45+3' (pen.), 54' (pen.); Sio 84'	Report	Boupendza 25'; Munir (red card) 43'	Stadium: Eryaman Stadium; Attendance: 0 Referee: Yasin Kol

10 January 2021 18	Hatayspor	2–2	Beşiktaş	Antakya
19:00 TRT (UTC+3)	Boupendza 7', 23', (yellow card) 44'; Aabid (yellow card) 44'; Billong (yellow card) 45+3'; Pablo (yellow card) 88'	Report	Aboubakar 6'; Larin 41'; Welinton (yellow card) 84'	Stadium: Antakya Atatürk Stadium; Attendance: 0 Referee: Ali Palabıyık

17 January 2021 19	Denizlispor	0–2	Hatayspor	Denizli
13:30	Hadi Sacko (yellow card) 77'; Sakıb Aytaç (yellow card) 90'	Report	(yellow card) 32' (yellow-red card) 84' Jean-Claude Billong; (yellow card) 35' Rúben Ribeiro; 47' (o.g.) Muhammet Özkal; 78' (pen.) Mame Biram Diouf	Stadium: Atatürk Stadium; Attendance: 0 Referee: Koray Gençerler

20 January 2021 20	Hatayspor	1–2	Yeni Malatyaspor	Antakya
16:00 TRT (UTC+3)	Sackey (yellow card) 51'; Aabid (yellow card) 61'; Boupendza 87'; Abdioğlu (yellow card) 90+7'; Mert (yellow card) 90+9'	Report	Acquah (yellow card) 39'; Hadebe (yellow card) 45+2'; Yavru 53'; Büyük 77' (pen.) (yellow card) 80'	Stadium: Antakya Atatürk Stadium; Attendance: 0 Referee: Ramazan Keleş; Fourth official: Kadir Sağlam

24 January 2021 21	Gaziantep	1–1	Hatayspor	Gaziantep
19:00 TRT (UTC+3)	Maxim (yellow card) 23'; Demir (yellow card) 33'; Jefferson 30' (yellow card) 90+9'	Report	Canlı (yellow card) 18'; Abdioğlu (yellow card) 90+5'; Júnior Morais 90+8' (o.g.)	Stadium: New Gaziantep Stadium; Attendance: 0 Referee: Fırat Aydınus; Fourth official: Çağdaş Altay

30 January 2021 22	İstanbul Başakşehir	1–5	Hatayspor	Istanbul
16:00 TRT (UTC+3)	Türüç (yellow card) 37'; Aleksić (yellow card) 67'; Kamara 80' (o.g.); Fernandes (yellow card) 90'	Report	Diouf 11', 57'; David 21' (pen.), (yellow card) 33'; Boupendza 43' (pen.), 68'	Stadium: Başakşehir Fatih Terim Stadium; Attendance: 0 Referee: Cüneyt Çakır

2 February 2021 23	Hatayspor	1–2	Fenerbahçe	Antakya
16:00	Mesut Çaytemel (yellow card) 38'; Rúben Ribeiro (yellow card) 50'; Pablo (yellow card) 60'; Aaron Boupendza 90' (yellow card) 90'	Report	26' Mame Thiam; (yellow card) 73' Papiss Cissé; 88' (o.g.) Jean-Claude Billong; (yellow card) 90' Altay Bayındır	Stadium: Hatay New Stadium; Attendance: 0 Referee: Suat Arslanboğa

6 February 2021 24	Kasımpaşa	1–4	Hatayspor	Istanbul
13:30 TRT (UTC+3)	Erdoğan (yellow card) 16'; Thelin 56'	Report	Aaron Boupendza 44'; Aabid 72'; Canlı 84'; Kamara 90+1'	Stadium: Recep Tayyip Erdoğan Stadium; Attendance: 0 Referee: Bahattin Şimşek; Fourth official: Çağdaş Altay

14 February 2021 25	Hatayspor	0–0	Alanyaspor	Antakya
16:00 TRT (UTC+3)		Report		Stadium: Hatay New Stadium; Attendance: 0 Referee: Turgut Doman

21 February 2021 26	BB Erzurumspor	1–3	Hatayspor	Erzurum
13:30 TRT (UTC+3)		Report		Stadium: Kazım Karabekir Stadium; Attendance: 0 Referee: Serkan Tokat

27 February 2021 27	Hatayspor	4–1	Ankaragücü	Antakya
13:30 TRT (UTC+3)		Report		Stadium: Hatay New Stadium; Attendance: 0 Referee: Atilla Karaoğlan

3 March 2021 28	Sivasspor	1–1	Hatayspor	Sivas
16:00	Oğuz (yellow card) 48'; Yatabaré 54'; Katranis (yellow card) 68'	Report	Sackey (yellow card) 34'; David (yellow card) 57'; Diouf 59'	Stadium: 4 Eylül Stadium; Attendance: 0 Referee: Mustafa Öğretmenoğlu

7 March 2021 29	Hatayspor	1–3	Kayserispor	Antakya
16:00 TRT (UTC+3)	Koné (red card) 52'; Pablo 54'	Report	Parlak 24'; Demirok 36'; Henrique 58'	Stadium: Hatay New Stadium; Attendance: 0 Referee: Yaşar Kemal Uğurlu

14 March 2021 30	Çaykur Rizespor	1–0	Hatayspor	Rize
16:00 TRT (UTC+3)	Boldrin 71'	Report		Stadium: Yeni Rize Şehir Stadium; Attendance: 0 Referee: Suat Arslanboga

31	BYE

3 April 2021 32	Hatayspor	3–0	Galatasaray	Antakya
19:00 TRT (UTC+3)	Diouf 21', 72'; Ribeiro 29'; Yusuf (yellow card) 36'; Mesut (yellow card) 52'; Kamara (yellow card) 52'; David (yellow card) 57'; Aabid (yellow card) 64'; Popov (red card) 79'	Report	Arda (yellow card) 24'; Şener (yellow card) 62'	Stadium: New Hatay Stadium; Attendance: 0 Referee: Abdulkadir Bitigen

6 April 2021 33	Fatih Karagümrük	1–0	Hatayspor	Istanbul
16:00 TRT (UTC+3)		Report		Stadium: Atatürk Olympic Stadium; Referee: Volkan Bayarslan

10 April 2021 34	Hatayspor	2–3	Göztepe	Antakya
13:30 TRT (UTC+3)		Report		Stadium: New Hatay Stadium; Referee: Erkan Özdamar

17 April 2021 35	Trabzonspor	1–1	Hatayspor	Trabzon
16:00 TRT (UTC+3)		Report		Stadium: Şenol Güneş Sports Complex; Referee: Zorbay Kücük

20 April 2021 36	Hatayspor	3–2	Antalyaspor	Antakya
19:00 TRT (UTC+3)		Report		Stadium: New Hatay Stadium; Referee: Bahattin Şimşek

24 April 2021 37	Konyaspor	0–0	Hatayspor	Konya
13:30 TRT (UTC+3)		Report		Stadium: Konya Metropolitan Municipality Stadium; Referee: Atilla Karaoğlan

27 April 2021 38	Hatayspor	3–1	Gençlerbirliği	Antakya
20:30 TRT (UTC+3)		Report		Stadium: New Hatay Stadium; Referee: Arda Kardeşler

1 May 2021 39	Beşiktaş	7–0	Hatayspor	Istanbul
20:30 TRT (UTC+3)	David 2' (o.g.); Larin 11', 14', 55', 65'; Nkoudou 38'; Yılmaz 44'	Report	Canlı (yellow card) 47'; David (yellow card) 75'; Ribeiro (yellow card) 84'	Stadium: Vodafone Park; Attendance: 0 Referee: Ali Palabıyık

8 May 2021 40	Hatayspor	1–0	Denizlispor	Antakya
20:30 TRT (UTC+3)	Boupendza 68'	Report		Stadium: New Hatay Stadium; Referee: Erkan Özdamar

11 May 2021 41	Yeni Malatyaspor	1–1	Hatayspor	Malatya
20:30 TRT (UTC+3)	Büyük 64'	Report	Diouf 45'	Stadium: New Malatya Stadium; Referee: Halil Umut Meler

15 May 2021 42	Hatayspor	0–1	Gaziantep	Antakya
18:00 TRT (UTC+3)		Report	Jefferson Júnior 73'	Stadium: New Hatay Stadium; Referee: Serkan Tokat

=== Turkish Cup ===
5 November 2020 Third round	Hatayspor	2–1	Şanlıurfaspor	Hatay
20:30	Aydın 26' (pen.); Hélder Barbosa 75'	Report	Galip Güzel (yellow card) 21'; Muhammet Mahmut Emir (yellow card) 40' (goal) 84'	Stadium: Antakya Atatürk; Attendance: 0 Referee: Mustafa Filiz

25 November 2020 Fourth round	Hatayspor	2–2 (a.e.t.) (4–5 p)	Karacabey Belediyespor	Hatay
15:00	Örnek 25'; Sackey (yellow card) 79'; David 80' (yellow card) 90'; Baha Berk Aygün (yellow card) 115'; Abdioğlu (yellow card) 117'	Report	Temel Taşkın 20'; Ömer Çetinbaş 63'; Berk Nizam (yellow card) 104'; Ömer Faruk Gümüş (yellow card) 109'	Stadium: Antakya Atatürk; Attendance: 0 Referee: Kutluhan Bilgiç

== Statistics ==
=== Goalscorers ===
Rank	No.	Pos	Nat	Name	Süper Lig	Turkish Cup	Total
1	9	FW	(Gabon)	Aaron Boupendza	18	0	18
2	92	FW	(Senegal)	Mame Biram Diouf	11	0	11
3	17	MF	(Nigeria)	Babajide David	6	1	7
4	7	FW	(Portugal)	Hélder Barbosa	1	1	2
4	8	MF	(France)	Rayane Aabid	2	0	2
4	10	MF	(Turkey)	Selim Ilgaz	2	0	2
4	20	FW	(Germany)	Mirkan Aydın	1	1	2
8	3	DF	(Greece)	Alexandros Katranis	1	0	1
8	4	DF	(Turkey)	Soner Örnek	0	1	1
8	14	DF	(Brazil)	Pablo	1	0	1
8	23	MF	(Turkey)	Abdurrahman Canlı	1	0	1
8	30	FW	(Liberia)	Mohammed Kamara	1	0	1
Own goals					3	0	3
Totals					48	4	52

Last updated: 7 March 2021
