= 2020–21 Kasımpaşa S.K. season =

Kasımpaşa
2020–21 season
- Owner: Turgay Ciner
- Chairman: Hasan Hilmi Öksüz
- Manager: Mehmet Altıparmak (until 2 November 2020); İrfan Buz (from 13 November 2020 to 27 November 2020); Fuat Çapa (from 28 November 2020)
- Stadium: Recep Tayyip Erdoğan Stadium
- Süper Lig: 15th
- Turkish Cup: Round of 16
- Top goalscorer: League: Yusuf Erdoğan (7); All: Yusuf Erdoğan; Armin Hodžić (7 each)
Home colours	Away colours	Third colours
- All statistics correct as of 8 March 2021.

The 2020–21 season is Kasımpaşa S.K.'s 100th season in existence and the club's sixth consecutive season in the top flight of Turkish football. In addition to the domestic league, Kasımpaşa will participate in this season's editions of the Turkish Cup. The season covers the period from July 2020 to 30 June 2021.

== Players ==
=== First-team squad ===
As of 4 October 2020

Note: Flags indicate national team as defined under FIFA eligibility rules; some limited exceptions apply. Players may hold more than one non-FIFA nationality.

No.	Pos.	Nation	Player
1	GK	TUR	Ramazan Köse
2	DF	TUR	Berk Çetin
3	DF	TUN	Oussama Haddadi (on loan from Al-Ettifaq)
5	MF	TUR	Tarkan Serbest
6	MF	KOS	Loret Sadiku
7	MF	TUR	Anıl Koç
9	FW	GUI	Bengali-Fodé Koita
10	MF	BIH	Haris Hajradinović
11	MF	TUR	Yusuf Erdoğan
14	FW	GHA	Gilbert Koomson
15	FW	CIV	Gerard Gohou
17	DF	TUR	Ahmet Oğuz
18	DF	TUR	Evren Eren Elmalı
19	DF	GUI	Julian Jeanvier (on loan from Brentford)
20	MF	BRA	Alan Cariús

No.	Pos.	Nation	Player
21	MF	HUN	Kevin Varga
22	GK	GER	Erdem Canpolat
23	MF	TUR	Feyzi Yıldırım
24	DF	BEL	Mickaël Tirpan
25	DF	CZE	Tomáš Břečka
30	FW	BIH	Armin Hodžić (on loan from Fehérvár)
33	GK	TUR	Ertuğrul Taşkıran
34	MF	NED	Doğucan Haspolat
35	MF	TUR	Aytaç Kara
37	DF	TUR	Çağtay Kurukalıp
55	FW	TUR	Yasin Dülger
67	GK	TUR	Mehmet Enes Sarı
77	MF	TUR	Azad Toptik
94	DF	KOS	Florent Hadergjonaj

== Transfers ==
=== In ===
No.	Pos	Player	Transferred from	Fee	Date	Source
19	DF	(Mali) Julian Jeanvier	(England) Brentford	Loan	3 September 2020	
92	FW	(Sweden) Isaac Kiese Thelin	(Belgium) Anderlecht	Loan	5 January 2021	
32	DF	(Netherlands) Derrick Luckassen	(Netherlands) PSV	Loan	11 January 2021	
4	MF	(England) Danny Drinkwater	(England) Chelsea	Loan	18 January 2021	
26	MF	(Croatia) Kristijan Bistrović	(Russia) CSKA Moscow	Loan	22 January 2021	

=== Out ===
No.	Pos	Player	Transferred to	Fee	Date	Source
17	FW	(Portugal) Ricardo Quaresma	Released	Free	29 July 2020	

== Pre-season and friendlies ==
Win Draw Loss Fixtures

3 September 2020 Friendly	Kasımpaşa (Turkey)	2–2	(Turkey) İstanbul Başakşehir	Istanbul, Turkey
19:00 TRT (UTC+3)	Erdoğan 21'; Pavelka 50'	Report	Ba 43', 82' (pen.)	Stadium: Recep Tayyip Erdoğan Stadium

11 October 2020 Friendly	Kasımpaşa (Turkey)	0–5	(Turkey) İstanbul Başakşehir	Istanbul, Turkey
17:00 TRT (UTC+3)		Report	Ba 10'; Crivelli 40'; Topal 57'; Gulbrandsen 65'; Kahveci 68' (pen.)	Stadium: Kasimpaşaspor Kemerburgaz Tesisleri

== Competitions ==
=== Overview ===
Competition	First match	Last match	Starting round	Final position	Record							
Competition	First match	Last match	Starting round	Final position	Pld	W	D	L	GF	GA	GD	Win %
Süper Lig	August 2020	May 2021	Matchday 1		28	8	6	14	31	44	−13	28.57
Turkish Cup	26 November 2020	14 January 2021	Fourth round	Round of 16	3	2	0	1	8	1	+7	66.67
Total					31	10	6	15	39	45	−6	32.26

Last updated: 8 March 2021
Source: FBref

=== Süper Lig ===
==== League table ====
Pos	Team	Pld	W	D	L	GF	GA	GD	Pts
12	Başakşehir	40	12	12	16	43	55	−12	48
13	Çaykur Rizespor	40	12	12	16	53	69	−16	48
14	Kasımpaşa	40	12	10	18	47	57	−10	46
15	Yeni Malatyaspor	40	10	15	15	49	53	−4	45
16	Antalyaspor	40	9	17	14	41	55	−14	44

Source: Süper Lig, Soccerway
Rules for classification: 1) Points; 2) Head-to-head points; 3) Head-to-head goal difference; 4) Head-to-head goals scored; 5) Goal difference; 6) Goals scored; 7) Play-off.

==== Results summary ====
Overall								Home						Away					
Pld	W	D	L	GF	GA	GD	Pts	W	D	L	GF	GA	GD	W	D	L	GF	GA	GD
28	8	6	14	33	44	−11	30	6	2	6	18	22	−4	2	4	8	15	22	−7

Last updated: 8 March 2021.
Source: FBref

==== Results by round ====
Round	1	2	3	4	5	6	7	8	9	10	11	12	13	14	15	16	17	18	19	20	21	22	23	24	25	26	27	28	29	30	31	32	33	34	35	36	37	38	39	40	41	42
Ground	A	H	A	H	A	H	A	H	A	H	A	H	A	H	A	H	B	A	H	A	H	H	A	H	A	H	A	H	A	H	A	H	A	H	A	H	A	B	H	A	H	A
Result	L	W	L	W	D	D	W	D	L	W	L	W	L	L	D	L	B	W	L	L	W	L	D	L	L	W	L	L	D									B				
Position	14	9	13	9	8	7	6	7	12	6	10	7	10	13	13	13	17	13	15	16	12	12	12	14	15	14	14	15	15													

Updated to match(es) played on 8 March 2021. Source: FBref
A = Away; H = Home; B = Bye; W = Win; D = Draw; L = Loss

Note: Since the league has been expanded to 21 teams each team will earn a bye twice this season.

==== Matches ====
13 September 2020 1	Kayserispor	1–0	Kasımpaşa	Kayseri
17:00	Kvržić 2'	Report		Stadium: Kadir Has Stadium; Attendance: 0 Referee: Yaşar Kemal Uğurlu

20 September 2020 2	Kasımpaşa	2–0	Çaykur Rizespor	Istanbul
16:00 TRT (UTC+3)	Varga 13' (yellow card) 86'; Kara (yellow card) 20'; Alan Cariús 60'; Serbest (yellow card) 83'; Koç (red card) 80'	Report	Durak (yellow card) 73'	Stadium: Recep Tayyip Erdoğan Stadium; Referee: Suat Arslanboğa

26 September 2020 3	Hatayspor	1–0	Kasımpaşa	Antakya
17:00 TRT (UTC+3)	Çaytemel (yellow card) 45+2'; Diouf (yellow card) 50' (goal) 57'	Report	Kara (yellow card) 36'; Serbest (yellow card) 74'; Oğuz (yellow card) 90+6'	Stadium: Antakya Atatürk Stadyumu; Attendance: 0 Referee: Hüseyin Göçek

4 October 2020 4	Kasımpaşa	1–0	Galatasaray	Istanbul
19:00 TRT	Yusuf 45'; Ramazan (yellow card) 79'	Report	Luyindama (yellow card) 85'	Stadium: Recep Tayyip Erdoğan Stadium; Attendance: 0 Referee: Cüneyt Çakır; Assistant referees: Tarık Ongun, Orkun Aktaş; Fourth official: Yasin Kol

18 October 2020 5	Fatih Karagümrük	1–1	Kasımpaşa	Istanbul
16:00	Sobiech 45+2'; Durmaz (red card) 74'	Report	Kara 47'	Stadium: Atatürk Olympic Stadium; Attendance: 0 Referee: Erkan Özdamar

23 October 2020 6	Kasımpaşa	0–0	Göztepe	Istanbul
20:00		Report		Stadium: Recep Tayyip Erdoğan Stadium; Attendance: 0 Referee: Burak Şeker

30 October 2020 7	Trabzonspor	3–4	Kasımpaşa	Trabzon
20:00	Serkan Asan 23'; Anthony Nwakaeme 31', 38' (yellow card) 90+2'; Djaniny (yellow card) 86'	Report	Mickaël Tirpan 8'; Yusuf Erdoğan 41'; Aytaç Kara (penalty missed) 58'; Bengali-Fodé Koita (yellow card) 86' (goal) 90+3'; Edgar Ié 87' (o.g.); Vitor Hugo (yellow card) 90+3'	Stadium: Şenol Güneş Stadium; Referee: Tugay Kaan Numanoğlu; Assistant referees: İsmail Şencan, Mustafa Savranlar; Fourth official: Direnç Tonusluoğlu

7 November 2020 8	Kasımpaşa	2–2	Antalyaspor	Istanbul
13:30 TRT (UTC+3)	Koita 8'; Sadiku (yellow card) 62'; Hodžić 65'; Tirpan (yellow card) 82'; Haddadi (yellow card) 90+6'	Report	72' Sarı; 90+2' Sam	Stadium: Recep Tayyip Erdoğan Stadium; Attendance: 0 Referee: Serkan Tokat

22 November 2020 9	Konyaspor	2–1	Kasımpaşa	Konya
16:00 TRT	Jevtović (yellow card) 21'; Skubic 48'; Demirbağ (yellow card) 84'; Çağıran 89'; Kravets (yellow card) 90+2'	Report	Kara 17' (yellow card) 89'; Haddadi (yellow card) 60'; Břečka (yellow card) 88'	Stadium: Konya Büyükşehir Stadium; Attendance: 0 Referee: (Turkey) Yasin Kol

29 November 2020 10	Kasımpaşa	2–0	Gençlerbirliği	Istanbul
16:00	Hodžić 16', 25'	Report		Stadium: Recep Tayyip Erdoğan Stadium; Attendance: 0 Referee: Mete Kalkavan; Fourth official: Mustafa Kürşad Filiz

4 December 2020 11	Beşiktaş	3–0	Kasımpaşa	Istanbul
19:30 TRT (UTC+3)	Bernard 45+3'; Hutchinson 68'; Toköz (yellow card) 70'; Aboubakar 75'	Report	Hadergjonaj (red card) 55'	Stadium: Vodafone Park; Attendance: 0 Referee: Bahattin Şimsek
Note: Match was played behind closed doors due to the COVID-19 pandemic in Turkey.

11 December 2020 12	Kasımpaşa	3–2	Denizlispor	Istanbul
19:00	Feyzi Yıldırım (yellow card) 3'; Mustafa Yumlu 36' (o.g.); Bengali-Fodé Koita 42' (yellow card) 45+1'; Kevin Varga 51'	Report	39' Recep Niyaz; (yellow card) 45+1' Marvin Bakalorz; 90+2' (pen.) Hugo Rodallega; (yellow card) 90+6' Mustafa Yumlu	Stadium: Recep Tayyip Erdoğan Stadium; Attendance: 0 Referee: Ramazan Keleş; Assistant referees: Mehmet Metin, Mehmet Salih Mazlum; Fourth official: Çağdaş Altay

19 December 2020 13	Yeni Malatyaspor	2–0	Kasımpaşa	Malatya
16:00	Büyük 45+4' (pen.), 56' (pen.); Acquah (yellow card) 64'; Şahan (yellow card) 80'	Report	Kara (yellow card) 45+3'	Stadium: Malatya Arena; Attendance: 0 Referee: Arda Kardeşler; Fourth official: Atilla Karaoğlan

23 December 2020 14	Kasımpaşa	0–4	Gaziantep	Istanbul
19:00		Report	Maxim 9' (pen.), 25'; Jefferson 57'; Demir 79'	Stadium: Recep Tayyip Erdoğan Stadium; Attendance: 0 Referee: Koray Gençerler

27 December 2020 15	İstanbul Başakşehir	2–2	Kasımpaşa	Istanbul
19:00 TRT (UTC+3)	Chadli 27'; Višća 90+2'	Report	Erdoğan 36'; Hodžić 84'	Stadium: Başakşehir Fatih Terim Stadium; Attendance: 0 Referee: Fırat Aydınus

4 January 2021 16	Kasımpaşa	0–3	Fenerbahçe	Istanbul
19:00	Loret Sadiku (yellow card) 64'; Feyzi Yıldırım (yellow card) 81'	Report	14', 45' Mame Thiam; (yellow card) 54' Sinan Gümüş; 86' Ferdi Kadıoğlu	Stadium: Recep Tayyip Erdoğan Stadium; Attendance: 0 Referee: Halis Özkahya; Assistant referees: Serkan Olguncan, Kemal Yılmaz; Fourth official: Burak Şeker

17	Bye

11 January 2021 18	Alanyaspor	1–2	Kasımpaşa	Alanya
19:00	Bakasetas 39' (pen.)	Report	Hodžić 22'; Haddadi (red card) 25'; Erdoğan 33'	Stadium: Bahçeşehir Okulları Stadium; Attendance: 0 Referee: Abdulkadir Bitigen; Fourth official: Burak Pakkan

18 January 2021 19	Kasımpaşa	1–2	BB Erzurumspor	Istanbul
19:00	Luckassen (yellow card) 58' (yellow-red card) 90+1'; Erdoğan (yellow card) 66'; Thelin 73'; Varga (yellow card) 84'; Hajradinović (yellow card) 90+5'	Report	Alkılıç 31'; Chahechouhe (yellow card) 64'; Gomes 68'; Boumal (yellow card) 71'; Szumski (yellow card) 86'; Karakullukçu (yellow card) 89'	Stadium: Recep Tayyip Erdoğan Stadium; Attendance: 0 Referee: Atilla Karaoğlan; Fourth official: Direnç Tonusluoğlu

21 January 2021 20	Ankaragücü	1–0	Kasımpaşa	Ankara
19:00	Hadergjonaj 16' (o.g.); Çekiçi (yellow card) 45+3'; Çankaya (yellow card) 53'; Pinto (yellow card) 71'; Çelikay (yellow card) 90+1'; Güral (yellow card) 90+6'	Report	Kara (yellow card) 24'; Hodžić (yellow card) 32'; Břečka (yellow card) 36'; Erdoğan (yellow card) 44'; Sadiku (yellow card) 80'	Stadium: Eryaman Stadium; Attendance: 0 Referee: Sarper Baris Saka; Fourth official: Çağdaş Altay

25 January 2021 21	Kasımpaşa	2–0	Sivasspor	Istanbul
16:00	Hajradinović 6'; Kara 17'	Report		Stadium: Recep Tayyip Erdoğan Stadium; Attendance: 0 Referee: Mert Güzenge; Fourth official: Abdullah Taşkınsoy

30 January 2021 22	Kasımpaşa	0–1	Kayserispor	Istanbul
13:30		Report	Demirok 90+4'	Stadium: Recep Tayyip Erdoğan Stadium; Attendance: 0 Referee: Hüseyin Göçek; Fourth official: Yiğit Arslan

2 February 2021 23	Çaykur Rizespor	1–1	Kasımpaşa	Rize
19:00 TRT (UTC+3)	Erdoğan 85'	Report	Thelin 90+1'	Stadium: Yeni Rize Şehir Stadium; Attendance: 0 Referee: Serkan Tokat

6 February 2021 24	Kasımpaşa	1–4	Hatayspor	Istanbul
13:30 TRT (UTC+3)	Erdoğan (yellow card) 16'; Thelin 56'	Report	Aaron Boupendza 44'; Aabid 72'; Canlı 84'; Kamara 90+1'	Stadium: Recep Tayyip Erdoğan Stadium; Attendance: 0 Referee: Bahattin Şimşek; Fourth official: Çağdaş Altay

14 February 2021 25	Galatasaray	2–1	Kasımpaşa	Istanbul
16:00 TRT	Kerem 9'; Mohamed 89' (pen.)	Report	Thelin (yellow card) 15' (goal) 51'; Hajradinović (yellow card) 71'; Varga (yellow card) 82'; Tošić (yellow card) 84'	Stadium: Türk Telekom Stadium; Attendance: 0 Referee: Erkan Özdamar; Assistant referees: Serkan Ok, Mustafa Sönmez; Fourth official: Kutluhan Bilgiç

20 February 2021 26	Kasımpaşa	3–2	Fatih Karagümrük	Istanbul
13:30	Thelin 20'; Erdoğan 59', 68'; Bistrović (yellow card) 75'	Report	Roco 14'; Bertolacci (yellow card) 24'; Castro 80'; Altınay (yellow card) 89'	Stadium: Recep Tayyip Erdoğan Stadium; Attendance: 0 Referee: Yaşar Kemal Uğurlu; Fourth official: Burak Taşkınsoy

28 February 2021 27	Göztepe	1–0	Kasımpaşa	Göztepe
16:00	Aydoğdu (yellow card) 20'; Ndiaye 25'; Emir (yellow card) 72' (yellow-red card) 84'	Report	Luckassen (red card) 15'; Kara (yellow card) 35'; Erdoğan (yellow card) 53'	Stadium: Gürsel Aksel Stadium; Attendance: 0 Referee: Suat Arslanboga; Fourth official: Cihan Aydın

4 March 2021 28	Kasımpaşa	1–2	Trabzonspor	Istanbul
16:00	Hadergjonaj (yellow card) 33'; Erdoğan 39' (pen.)	Report	Djaniny 24' (yellow card) 78'; Bakasetas 73'; Çakır (yellow card) 90+2'	Stadium: Recep Tayyip Erdoğan Stadium; Referee: Abdulkadir Bitigen; Assistant referees: Kerem Ersoy, Mustafa Savranlar; Fourth official: Abdullah Buğra Taşkınsoy

8 March 2021 29	Antalyaspor	1–1	Kasımpaşa	Antalya
16:00 TRT (UTC+3)	Özmert 38'; Fredy (yellow card) 45'	Report	Thelin (yellow card) 9' (goal) 72'; Kara (yellow card) 36'; Bistrović (yellow card) 64'	Stadium: Antalya Stadium; Attendance: 0 Referee: Serkan Tokat

20 March 2021 31	Gençlerbirliği	2–1	Kasımpaşa	Ankara
13:30 TRT (UTC+3)				Stadium: Eryaman Stadium; Attendance: 0

4 April 2021 32	Kasımpaşa	1–0	Beşiktaş	Istanbul
19:00 TRT (UTC+3)	Kara 19', (yellow card) 57'; Thelin (penalty missed) 55'; Taşkıran (yellow card) 75'; Tošić (yellow card) 83'	Report	Welinton (yellow card) 89'	Stadium: Recep Tayyip Erdoğan Stadium; Attendance: 0 Referee: Halil Umut Meler

8 April 2021 33	Denizlispor	1–1	Kasımpaşa	Denizli
16:00 TRT (UTC+3)		Report		Stadium: Atatürk Stadium; Attendance: 0

22 April 2021 36	Kasımpaşa	0–1	İstanbul Başakşehir	Istanbul
19:00 TRT (UTC+3)	Serbest (yellow card) 31'; Sadiku (yellow card) 77'; Luckassen (yellow card) 90+10'	Report	Chadli 36'; Duarte (yellow card) 90+4'	Stadium: Recep Tayyip Erdoğan Stadium; Attendance: 0 Referee: Yaşar Kemal Uğurlu

25 April 2021 37	Fenerbahçe	3–2	Kasımpaşa	Istanbul
19:00 TRT (UTC+3)	Valencia 15', 45+1' (pen.); Szalai 40'; Kahveci (yellow card) 42'; Tekin (yellow card) 81'	Report	Hajradinović 21'; Thelin (yellow card) 33'; Hadergjonaj 82' (pen.)	Stadium: Şükrü Saracoğlu Stadium; Attendance: 0 Referee: Fırat Aydınus

38	Bye

3 May 2021 39	Kasımpaşa	v	Alanyaspor	Istanbul
16:00 TRT (UTC+3)				Stadium: Recep Tayyip Erdoğan Stadium

8 May 2021 40	BB Erzurumspor	v	Kasımpaşa	Erzurum
20:30 TRT (UTC+3)				Stadium: Kazım Karabekir Stadium

=== Turkish Cup ===
26 November 2020 Fourth round	Kasımpaşa	3–0	24Erzincanspor	Istanbul
15:00	Tirpan 56'; Alan 61'; Kalkan 90'			Stadium: Recep Tayyip Erdoğan

15 December 2020 Fifth round	Kasımpaşa	5–0	Muğlaspor	Istanbul
13:00	Alan 22'; Hodzic 25', 53'; Dülger 39'; Koç 57'			Stadium: Recep Tayyip Erdoğan

14 January 2021 Round of 16	Fenerbahçe	1–0	Kasımpaşa	Istanbul
20:45	Samatta 51'			Stadium: Ülker

== Statistics ==
=== Goalscorers ===
Rank	No.	Pos	Nat	Name	Süper Lig	Turkish Cup	Total
1	11	MF	(Turkey)	Yusuf Erdoğan	7	0	7
1	30	FW	(Bosnia and Herzegovina)	Armin Hodžić	5	2	7
3	92	FW	(Sweden)	Isaac Kiese Thelin	6	0	6
4	9	FW	(Guinea)	Bengali-Fodé Koita	3	0	3
4	20	MF	(Brazil)	Alan	1	2	3
4	35	MF	(Turkey)	Aytaç Kara	3	0	3
7	21	MF	(Hungary)	Kevin Varga	2	0	2
7	24	MF	(Belgium)	Mickaël Tirpan	1	1	2
9	7	MF	(Turkey)	Anıl Koç	0	1	1
9	10	MF	(Bosnia and Herzegovina)	Haris Hajradinović	1	0	1
9	41	MF	(Turkey)	Berat Kalkan	0	1	1
9	55	MF	(Turkey)	Yasin Dülger	0	1	1
Own goals					2	0	2
Totals					31	8	39

Last updated: 8 March 2021
