= Örnek =

Örnek is a Turkish surname. Notable people with the surname include:

- Soner Örnek (born 1989), Turkish footballer
- Tolga Örnek (born 1972), Turkish film director, writer, and producer

== See also ==
- Örnek (ornament), ornament
