= Ramazan Köse =

Turkish footballer

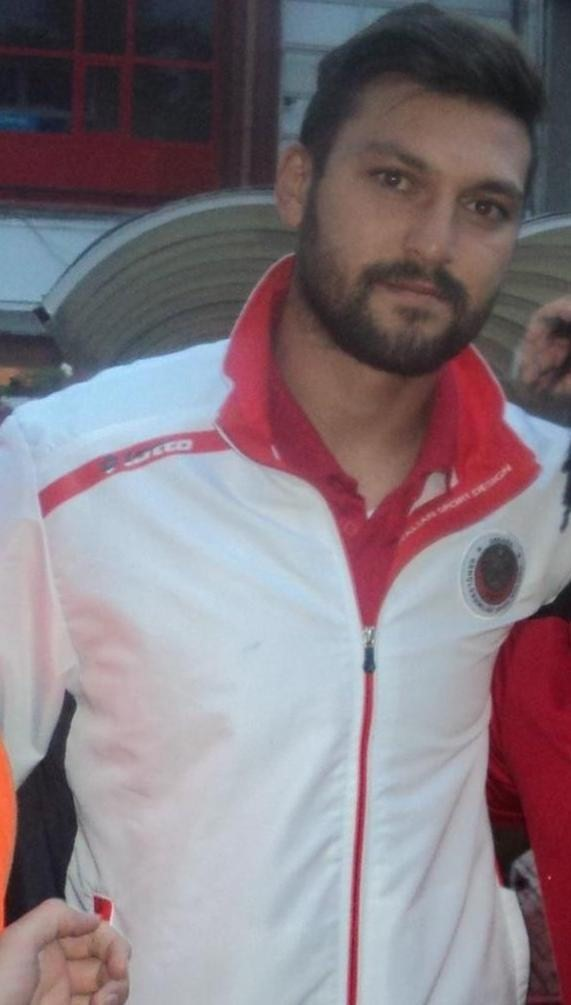

Personal information
- Date of birth: 12 May 1988 (age 38)
- Place of birth: Ankara, Turkey
- Height: 1.94 m (6 ft 4 in)
- Position: Goalkeeper

Team information
- Current team: Polatli 1926 SK
- Number: 1

Youth career
- 2001–2003: Tunç Altındağ
- 2003–2006: Gençlerbirliği

Senior career*
Years	Team	Apps	(Gls)
2006–2015	Gençlerbirliği	97	(0)
2009–2010	→ Giresunspor (loan)	29	(0)
2015–2021	Kasımpaşa	137	(0)
2021–2022	Gençlerbirliği	17	(0)
2022–2023	Şanlıurfaspor	4	(0)
2023–2025	Etimesgut Belediyespor	36	(0)
2025–	Polatli 1926 SK	1	(0)

International career
2012–2013	Turkey A1	2	(0)
- * Club domestic league appearances and goals

Ramazan Köse (born 12 May 1988) is a Turkish professional footballer who plays as a goalkeeper Polatli 1926 SK.

== Club career ==
On 23 August 2022, Köse signed with Şanlıurfaspor.

== Career statistics ==
Appearances and goals by club, season and competition
Club	Season	League			National cup		Other		Total	
Club	Season	Division	Apps	Goals	Apps	Goals	Apps	Goals	Apps	Goals
Gençlerbirliği	2007–08	Süper Lig	0	0	0	0	—		0	0
Gençlerbirliği	2008–09	Süper Lig	1	0	0	0	—		1	0
Gençlerbirliği	2010–11	Süper Lig	4	0	0	0	—		4	0
Gençlerbirliği	2011–12	Süper Lig	29	0	1	0	—		30	0
Gençlerbirliği	2012–13	Süper Lig	29	0	0	0	—		29	0
Gençlerbirliği	2013–14	Süper Lig	19	0	0	0	—		19	0
Gençlerbirliği	2014–15	Süper Lig	14	0	0	0	—		14	0
Gençlerbirliği	Total		96	0	1	0	—		97	0
Giresunspor (loan)	2008–09	TFF 1. Lig	4	0	0	0	—		4	0
Giresunspor (loan)	2009–10	TFF 1. Lig	21	0	3	0	—		24	0
Giresunspor (loan)	Total		25	0	3	0	—		28	0
Kasımpaşa	2015–16	Süper Lig	17	0	1	0	—		18	0
Kasımpaşa	2016–17	Süper Lig	31	0	5	0	—		36	0
Kasımpaşa	2017–18	Süper Lig	30	0	0	0	—		30	0
Kasımpaşa	2018–19	Süper Lig	25	0	3	0	—		28	0
Kasımpaşa	2019–20	Süper Lig	14	0	2	0	—		16	0
Kasımpaşa	2020–21	Süper Lig	20	0	0	0	—		20	0
Kasımpaşa	Total		137	0	11	0	—		148	0
Gençlerbirliği	2021–22	TFF 1. Lig	17	0	2	0	—		19	0
Şanlıurfaspor	2022–23	TFF 2. Lig	4	0	2	0	0	0	6	0
Etimesgut Belediyespor	2023–24	TFF 2. Lig	24	0	0	0	—		24	0
Etimesgut Belediyespor	2024–25	TFF 3. Lig	12	0	0	0	—		12	0
Etimesgut Belediyespor	Total		36	0	0	0	—		36	0
Polatli 1926 SK	2024–25	TFF 3. Lig	1	0	—		—		1	0
Career total			316	0	19	0	0	0	335	0
