= Alexandros Katranis =

Greek footballer (born 1998)

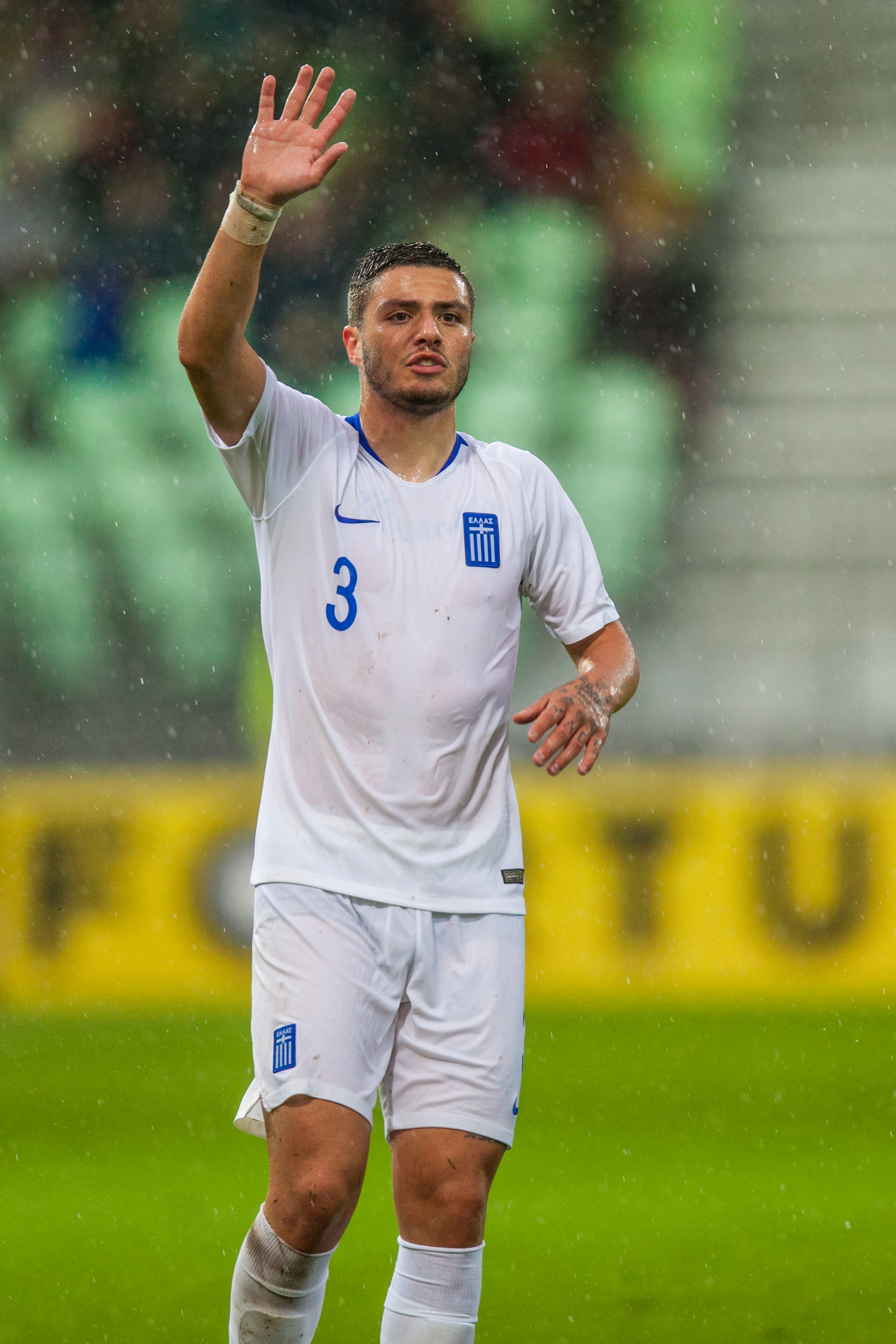
- Katranis with Greece in 2019

Personal information
- Full name: Alexandros Katranis
- Date of birth: 4 May 1998 (age 28)
- Place of birth: Volos, Greece
- Height: 1.74 m (5 ft 9 in)
- Position: Left-back

Team information
- Current team: Real Salt Lake
- Number: 98

Youth career
- 2012–2016: Atromitos

Senior career*
Years	Team	Apps	(Gls)
2016–2017	Atromitos	17	(0)
2017–2018	Saint-Étienne II	18	(0)
2017–2021	Saint-Étienne	0	(0)
2018–2019	→ Royal Mouscron (loan)	8	(0)
2019–2020	→ Atromitos (loan)	32	(0)
2020–2021	→ Hatayspor (loan)	22	(1)
2021–2024	Piast Gliwice	64	(0)
2024–	Real Salt Lake	61	(4)

International career
2014–2015	Greece U17	12	(0)
2015–2017	Greece U19	19	(1)
2017–2020	Greece U21	12	(1)
- * Club domestic league appearances and goals as of 19 April 2026

Alexandros Katranis (Greek: Αλέξανδρος Κατράνης; born 4 May 1998) is a Greek professional association footballer who plays as a left-back for Major League Soccer club Real Salt Lake.

Katranis joined Real Salt Lake in 2024 from Polish club Piast Gliwice, signing a contract through the 2025 MLS season with club options for 2026 and 2027. His option for the 2026 season was exercised by the club.

== Career ==
=== Atromitos ===
Katranis made his professional debut in the Super League for Atromitos on 25 September 2016 in a game against Asteras Tripolis. According to "footballscout24.it" website, Katranis was the only Greek player to feature on a list entitled "TOP 40 young talent in world football – born in 1998″.

=== Saint-Étienne ===
In August 2017, Ligue 1 side Saint-Étienne announced the signing of Katranis on a five-year contract. The transfer fee paid to Atromitos was reported as €800,000 plus as 15% re-sale clause in case of a future transfer. He failed to make an appearance for the first team.

On 18 August 2021, after four years with the club, Katranis terminated his contract by mutual consent. Although the 23-year-old had a year left on his contract, Saint-Étienne did not have him in their plans for the upcoming season, while he himself was unhappy with the fact that he was not given any opportunity to play for the club and with being loaned out numerous times.

==== Loan to Royal Mouscron ====
On 21 June 2018, he joined Belgian club Royal Excel Mouscron, on a season-long loan. In the first round, Katranis did not win favour of manager Bernd Storck and made only nine appearances, before returning to France at the start of 2019.

==== Loan to Atromitos ====
On 22 January 2019, the return of the young international to Atromitos was officially finalized for a year-and-a-half-long loan with a buy-out option, being brought in to replace Dimitris Giannoulis who returned to PAOK. On 1 August 2019, Atromitos reached the UEFA Europa League third qualifying round thanks to a 3–2 home win over Dunajska Streda at the Peristeri Stadium which gave the Athens club a 5–3 aggregate success. Katranis opened the score, as he picked up possession on the edge of the penalty area after the ball had deflected into his path, skipped past several opponents before slotting the ball past Martin Jedlička. It was his first goal in European club competitions.

==== Loan to Hatayspor ====
On 27 August 2020, Katranis was sent on another loan, this time joining Turkish Süper Lig side Hatayspor for the 2020–21 season.

=== Piast Gliwice ===
On 3 September 2021, Katranis signed a three-year contract with Ekstraklasa club Piast Gliwice.

=== Real Salt Lake ===
On 2 February 2024, Major League Soccer club Real Salt Lake announced the signing of Katranis on a two-year deal, with extension options.

== Career statistics ==
As of 13 April 2026

Appearances and goals by club, season and competition
Club	Season	League			National cup (Note: Includes Greek Cup, Belgian Cup, Turkish Cup, Polish Cup, U.S. Open Cup)		Continental		Other		Total	
Club	Season	Division	Apps	Goals	Apps	Goals	Apps	Goals	Apps	Goals	Apps	Goals
Atromitos	2016–17	Super League Greece	17	0	6	0	—		—		23	0
Saint-Étienne	2017–18	Ligue 1	0	0	0	0	—		0	0	0	0
Mouscron (loan)	2018–19	Belgian First Division A	8	0	1	0	—		—		9	0
Atromitos (loan)	2018–19	Super League Greece	10	0	2	0	—		—		12	0
Atromitos (loan)	2019–20	Super League Greece	22	0	2	0	4 (Note: Appearances in UEFA Europa League)	1	—		28	1
Atromitos (loan)	Total		32	0	4	0	4	1	—		40	1
Hatayspor (loan)	2020–21	Süper Lig	22	1	2	0	—		—		24	1
Piast Gliwice	2021–22	Ekstraklasa	19	0	1	0	—		—		20	0
Piast Gliwice	2022–23	Ekstraklasa	30	0	2	1	—		—		32	1
Piast Gliwice	2023–24	Ekstraklasa	15	0	1	0	—		—		16	0
Piast Gliwice	Total		64	0	4	1	—		—		68	1
Real Salt Lake	2024	Major League Soccer	29	3	1	0	—		4 (Note: Two appearances in MLS Cup playoffs, two appearances in Leagues Cup)	0	34	3
Real Salt Lake	2025	Major League Soccer	29	1	—		1 (Note: Appearance in CONCACAF Champions Cup)	0	3 (Note: One appearance in MLS Cup playoffs, two appearances in Leagues Cup)	0	33	1
Real Salt Lake	2026	Major League Soccer	2	0	—		—		0	0	2	0
Real Salt Lake	Total		60	4	1	0	1	0	7	0	69	4
Career total			203	5	18	1	5	1	7	0	331	7
