= Kristijan Bistrović =

Croatian footballer (born 1998)

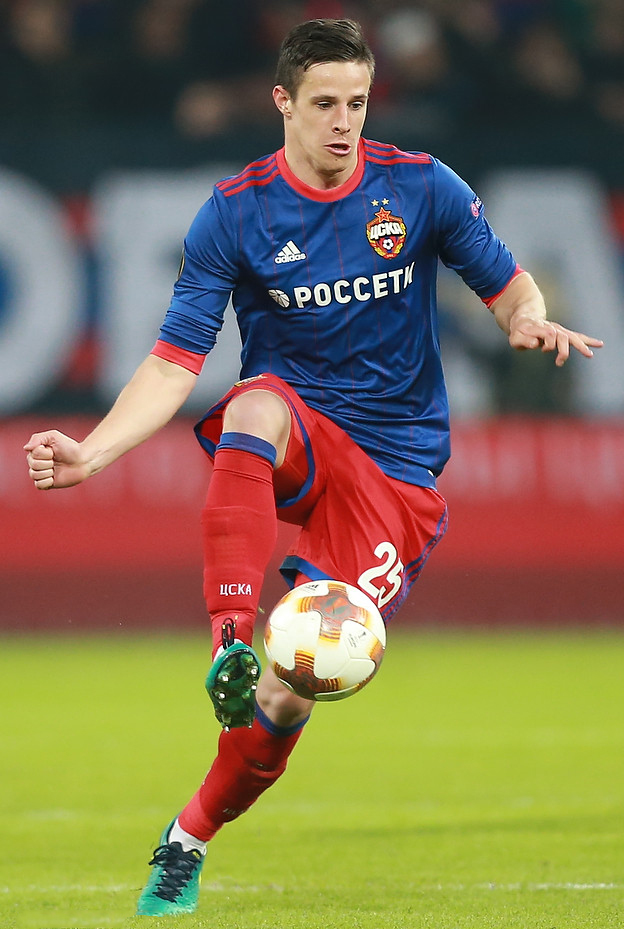
- Bistrović with CSKA Moscow in 2018

Personal information
- Date of birth: 9 April 1998 (age 28)
- Place of birth: Koprivnica, Croatia
- Height: 1.83 m (6 ft 0 in)
- Position: Central midfielder

Team information
- Current team: Akron Tolyatti
- Number: 8

Youth career
- Borac Imbriovec
- Slaven Belupo

Senior career*
Years	Team	Apps	(Gls)
2014–2018	Slaven Belupo	15	(0)
2018–2025	CSKA Moscow	95	(7)
2021	→ Kasımpaşa (loan)	20	(0)
2022	→ Fatih Karagümrük (loan)	18	(1)
2022–2023	→ Lecce (loan)	11	(0)
2023	→ Fortuna Sittard (loan)	13	(1)
2023–2024	→ Baltika Kaliningrad (loan)	23	(2)
2025–	Akron Tolyatti	26	(2)

International career^{‡}
2015	Croatia U18	1	(0)
2019–2021	Croatia U21	18	(4)
- * Club domestic league appearances and goals as of 21 November 2026 ‡ National team caps and goals as of 31 May 2021

Kristijan Bistrović (Croatian pronunciation: [krǐstijan bǐstroʋitɕ]; born 9 April 1998) is a Croatian professional footballer who plays as a central midfielder for Russian Premier League club Akron Tolyatti.

== Club career ==
=== Slaven Belupo ===
Bistrović made his senior debut for Slaven Belupo on 30 May 2015, coming on for Petar Mišić in 77th minute as Slaven lost 3–2 to Osijek. His proper debut came during 2016–17 season after the winter break, when he joined the senior team permanently. In summer 2017, during the preseason, Slaven drew 1–1 with Russian champions Spartak Moscow in a friendly match in Villach on 7 July. Slaven's equalizer was a joint effort of Bistrović and Bruno Bogojević, who netted it in. The match helped Bistrović attract attention of the Russian market, with Spartak's rivals CSKA Moscow's coach Viktor Goncharenko insisting that the club buys the young Croatian.

=== CSKA Moscow ===
On 12 January 2018, CSKA Moscow signed Bistrović for €500,000 until the summer of 2022. At the time of signing for the Moscow club, Bistrović had made only sixteen appearances for Slaven. On 8 March, he made his debut for the team in the UEFA Europa League round of 16 match against Lyon where he came on as a substitute for Alan Dzagoev in the 82nd minute. In the quarter-final home leg against Arsenal on 12 April, he was praised for his performance as CSKA drew 2–2, but nevertheless failed to progress to the semi-finals.

On 27 July, he played the whole game in the 2018 Russian Super Cup as CSKA defeated Lokomotiv Moscow 1–0 after extra time, earning Bistrović his first career trophy. He scored his first goal for CSKA on 18 August to contribute to a 3–0 victory over Arsenal Tula. On 1 September, he scored and assisted in a 4–0 victory over Ural Yekaterinburg, but suffered an ankle injury in closing minutes of the game. He came back to the team as an injury time substitute for Arnór Sigurðsson in a 2–0 victory over Zenit Saint Petersburg on 11 November. Sixteen days later, he made his Champions League debut in a 2–1 defeat to Viktoria Plzeň.

On 24 November 2019, he provided his compatriot Nikola Vlašić with an assist for the only goal in the 1–0 victory over Krylia Sovetov Samara.

On 20 September 2020, he scored the only goal in the 1–0 victory over Ufa. Seven days later, he received two yellow cards and was sent off as Lokomotiv Moscow defeated CSKA 1–0. On 10 December, he scored his first European goal, as CSKA lost 3–1 to Dinamo Zagreb in the Europa League. It was notably the first and only goal Dinamo conceded in the group stage.

==== Loan to Kasımpaşa ====
On 22 January 2021, he joined Kasımpaşa on loan until the end of the 2020–21 season. Kasımpaşa had an option to make transfer permanent at the end of the loan term.

==== Loan to Fatih Karagümrük ====
On 12 January 2022, he joined Fatih Karagümrük on loan until the end of the 2021–22 season, with Fatih Karagümrük having an option to make transfer permanent at the end of the loan term.

==== Loan to Lecce ====
On 24 July 2022, Bistrović joined Serie A club Lecce on a season-long loan, with the option for a permanent transfer.

==== Loan to Fortuna Sittard ====
On 17 January 2023, Lecce announced that Bistrović agreed to a new loan to Fortuna Sittard in the Netherlands. Fortuna confirmed the loan two days later. He made his debut for the club on 25 January 2023, starting in a 2–0 league victory against SC Heerenveen. On 3 March, he scored his first goal for Fortuna, helping the side to a 2–1 comeback win over Utrecht.

==== Loan to Baltika Kaliningrad ====
On 14 September 2023, Bistrović moved to Russian Premier League club Baltika Kaliningrad on loan with an option to buy. Baltika's manager Sergei Ignashevich was the teammate of Bistrović at CSKA in the 2017–18 season. In his debut game for Baltika on 16 September 2023 he scored an added-time equalizer in a 2–2 draw with Rostov.

==== Return to CSKA Moscow ====
Bistrović reclaimed his place in CSKA line-up during the 2024–25 Russian Premier League season under the new manager Marko Nikolić, first as a substitute and then more often appearing as a starter in the later part of the season. On 26 April 2025, he scored his first league goal for CSKA since July 2021, a late winner in a 2–1 Main Moscow derby game against Spartak Moscow, helping CSKA to rise up to third place in the standings. Bistrović left CSKA on 2 July 2025.

=== Akron Tolyatti ===
On 6 September 2025, Bistrović joined fellow Russian Premier League club Akron Tolyatti as a free agent.

== International career ==
Bistrović represented Croatia on youth levels. He was named in Nenad Gračan's 23-man squad for 2019 UEFA Under-21 Euro. However, he failed to make a single appearance as Croatia finished last in their group. Two years later, he was again named in Igor Bišćan's 23-man squad for the group stage of 2021 UEFA Under-21 Euro. He played all three group games as Croatia passed their group for the first time in history.

== Career statistics ==
=== Club ===
As of match played 21 November 2026

Appearances and goals by club, season and competition
Club	Season	League			Cup (Note: Includes Croatian Cup, Russian Cup, Turkish Cup and Coppa Italia)		Continental		Other		Total	
Club	Season	Division	Apps	Goals	Apps	Goals	Apps	Goals	Apps	Goals	Apps	Goals
Slaven Belupo	2014–15	Prva HNL	1	0	0	0	—		—		1	0
Slaven Belupo	2015–16	Prva HNL	0	0	0	0	—		—		0	0
Slaven Belupo	2016–17	Prva HNL	2	0	0	0	—		—		2	0
Slaven Belupo	2017–18	Prva HNL	12	0	1	0	—		—		13	0
Slaven Belupo	Total		15	0	1	0	—		—		16	0
CSKA Moscow	2017–18	Russian Premier League	7	0	0	0	2 (Note: Appearances in UEFA Europa League)	0	—		9	0
CSKA Moscow	2018–19	Russian Premier League	20	2	0	0	2 (Note: Appearances in UEFA Champions League)	0	1 (Note: Appearance in Russian Super Cup)	0	23	2
CSKA Moscow	2019–20	Russian Premier League	28	1	2	0	6	0	—		36	1
CSKA Moscow	2020–21	Russian Premier League	14	2	0	0	6	1	—		20	3
CSKA Moscow	2021–22	Russian Premier League	6	1	2	1	—		—		8	2
CSKA Moscow	2024–25	Russian Premier League	20	1	11	1	—		—		31	2
CSKA Moscow	Total		95	7	15	2	16	1	1	0	127	10
Kasımpaşa (loan)	2020–21	Süper Lig	20	0	—		—		—		20	0
Fatih Karagümrük (loan)	2021–22	Süper Lig	18	1	2	0	—		—		20	1
Lecce (loan)	2022–23	Serie A	11	0	1	0	—		—		12	0
Fortuna Sittard (loan)	2022–23	Eredivisie	13	1	—		—		—		13	1
Baltika Kaliningrad (loan)	2023–24	Russian Premier League	23	2	8	1	—		—		31	3
Akron Tolyatti	2025–26	Russian Premier League	12	1	2	0	—		2 (Note: Appearance in relegation play-offs)	0	16	1
Akron Tolyatti	2026–27	Russian Premier League	14	1	4	0	—		—		18	1
Akron Tolyatti	Total		26	2	6	0	0	0	2	0	34	2
Career total			221	13	33	3	16	1	3	0	273	17

== Honours ==
CSKA Moscow

- Russian Cup: 2024–25
- Russian Super Cup: 2018
