= Anıl Koç =

Turkish footballer

Personal information
- Date of birth: 29 January 1995 (age 31)
- Place of birth: Saint-Josse-ten-Noode, Belgium
- Height: 1.75 m (5 ft 9 in)
- Position: Left midfielder

Team information
- Current team: Kırklarelispor
- Number: 95

Youth career
- –2011: Anderlecht
- 2011–2013: Standard Liège

Senior career*
Years	Team	Apps	(Gls)
2013–2015	Standard Liège	5	(0)
2014	→ Charlton Athletic (loan)	0	(0)
2014–2015	→ Sint-Truiden (loan)	4	(0)
2015–2016	FC Eindhoven	29	(6)
2016–2017	Antalyaspor	0	(0)
2018	FK Atlantas	15	(2)
2018–2019	Altınordu	44	(14)
2020–2021	Kasımpaşa	32	(2)
2021–2023	Manisa	33	(2)
2024–2025	Boluspor	26	(1)
2025–2026	Sarıyer	7	(0)
2026	Serikspor	8	(1)
2026–	Kırklarelispor	8	(1)

International career
2010	Belgium U15	2	(4)
2010–2011	Belgium U16	10	(4)
2012	Turkey U17	5	(1)
2013	Turkey U19	1	(0)
- * Club domestic league appearances and goals as of 14 November 2026

Anıl Koç (born 29 January 1995) is a footballer who plays as a left midfielder for Turkish TFF 2. Lig club Kırklarelispor. Born in Belgium, he has represented both Belgium and Turkey at youth international levels.

== Career ==
He made his Belgian Pro League debut on 25 January 2013.

In January 2014, Koç signed on loan for Championship side Charlton Athletic until the end of the 2013–14 season. He did not make an appearance for Charlton before his loan spell expired.
