= Feyzi Yıldırım =

Turkish footballer (born 1996)

Personal information
- Full name: Mehmet Feyzi Yıldırım
- Date of birth: 23 January 1996 (age 30)
- Place of birth: Çifteler, Turkey
- Height: 1.75 m (5 ft 9 in)
- Position: Right-back

Team information
- Current team: Sivasspor
- Number: 26

Youth career
- 2006–2009: Çiftelerspor
- 2009–2014: Eskişehirspor

Senior career*
Years	Team	Apps	(Gls)
2014–2020	Eskişehirspor	54	(0)
2016–2017	→ Afyonspor (loan)	25	(1)
2017	→ Nazilli Belediyespor (loan)	4	(0)
2018	→ Niğde Anadolu (loan)	11	(0)
2020–2023	Kasımpaşa	23	(1)
2023–2025	Adanaspor	56	(7)
2025–	Sivasspor	21	(2)

International career^{‡}
2015	Turkey U19	2	(0)
- * Club domestic league appearances and goals as of 6 May 2026 ‡ National team caps and goals as of 23:11, 11 May 2021 (UTC)

Mehmet Feyzi Yıldırım (born 23 January 1996) is a Turkish professional footballer who plays as a right-back for TFF First League club Sivasspor.

== Club career ==
Yıldırım is a youth product of Eskişehirspor since 2009. Yıldırım made his professional debut with Eskişehirspor in a 3-0 Turkish Cup win over Balçova Yaşamspor on 16 January 2015. He continued his development on loans with Afyonspor, Nazilli Belediyespor, and Niğde Anadolu in semi-pro Turkish leagues. He returned to Eskişehirspor in 2018 where he was promoted to the main squad. On 2 September 2020, he signed with Kasımpaşa in the Süper Lig.

== International career ==
Yıldırım is a youth international for Turkey, having represented the Turkey U19s in 2015.
