= Yusuf Abdioğlu =

Turkish footballer (born 1989)

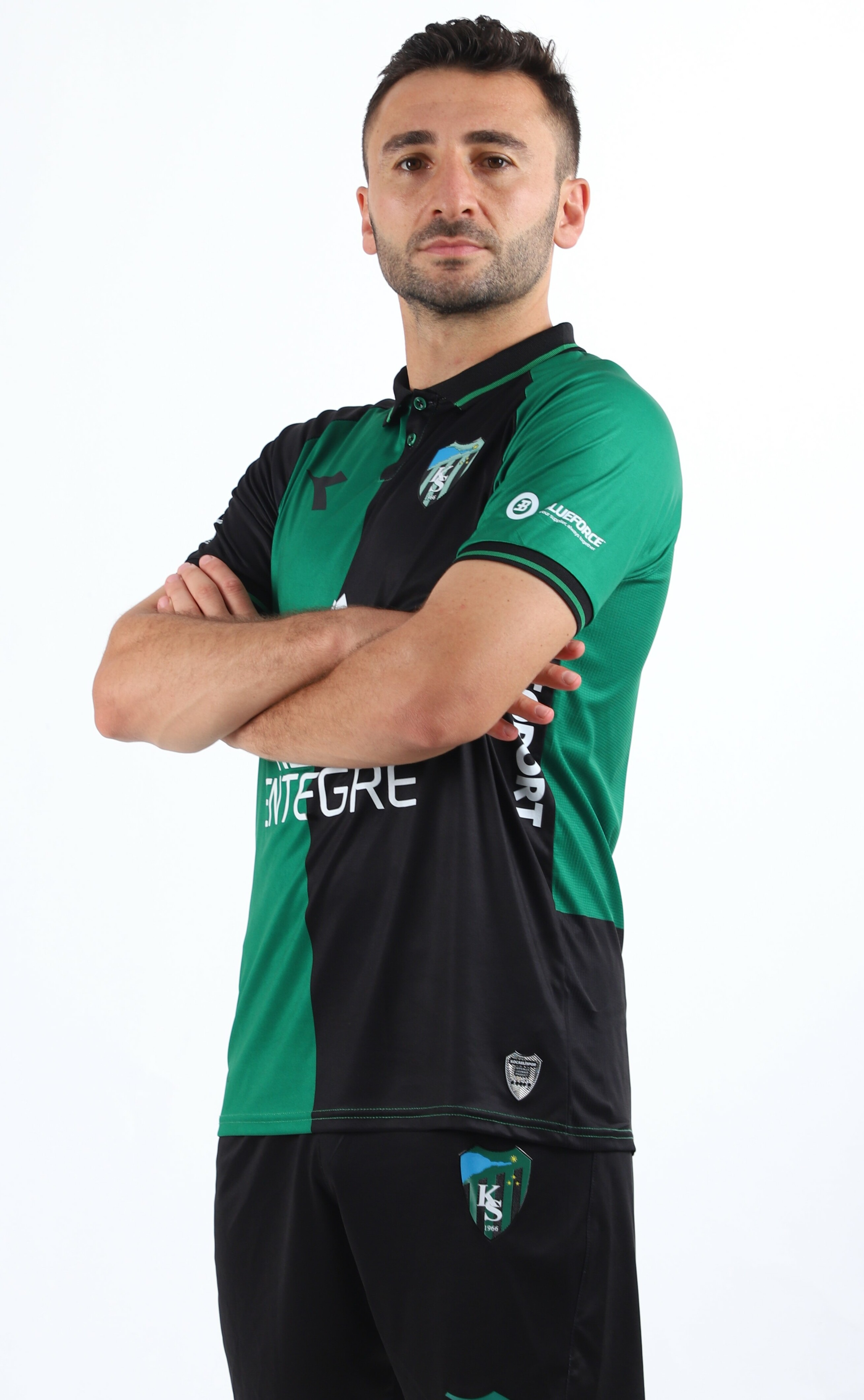

Personal information
- Date of birth: 14 October 1989 (age 37)
- Place of birth: Of, Turkey
- Height: 1.81 m (5 ft 11 in)
- Position: Defender

Team information
- Current team: Menemen
- Number: 22

Youth career
- 2001–2008: Samsun Telekomspor
- 2008–2010: Tekkeköy Belediyespor

Senior career*
Years	Team	Apps	(Gls)
2010–2011	Lüleburgazspor	34	(1)
2011–2012	Ofspor	21	(2)
2012–2014	Nazilli Belediyespor	63	(2)
2014–2017	Altınordu	87	(0)
2017–2018	Ankaragücü	20	(2)
2018–2021	Hatayspor	85	(6)
2021–2022	Ankaragücü	34	(6)
2022–2023	Samsunspor	21	(2)
2023–2024	Kocaelispor	28	(0)
2024–2025	Vanspor	32	(2)
2025–	Menemen	7	(0)
- * Club domestic league appearances and goals as of 30 November 2025

Yusuf Abdioğlu (born 14 October 1989) is a Turkish professional footballer who plays as a defender for TFF 2. Lig club Menemen.

== Professional career ==
Abdioğlu spent most of his early career in semi-pro in Turkey, starting with Lüleburgazspor. He had stints at Ofspor, Nazilli Belediyespor, Altınordu, and Ankaragücü before moving to Hatayspor in 2018. He helped them get promoted into the Süper Lig for the first time in their history in 2020. Abdioğlu made his professional debut with Hatayspor in a 2-0 Süper Lig win over defending champions İstanbul Başakşehir F.K. on 14 September 2020, at the age of 31.

On 21 June 2022, Abdioğlu signed a two-year contract with Samsunspor.
