= Isaac Kiese Thelin =

Swedish footballer (born 1992)

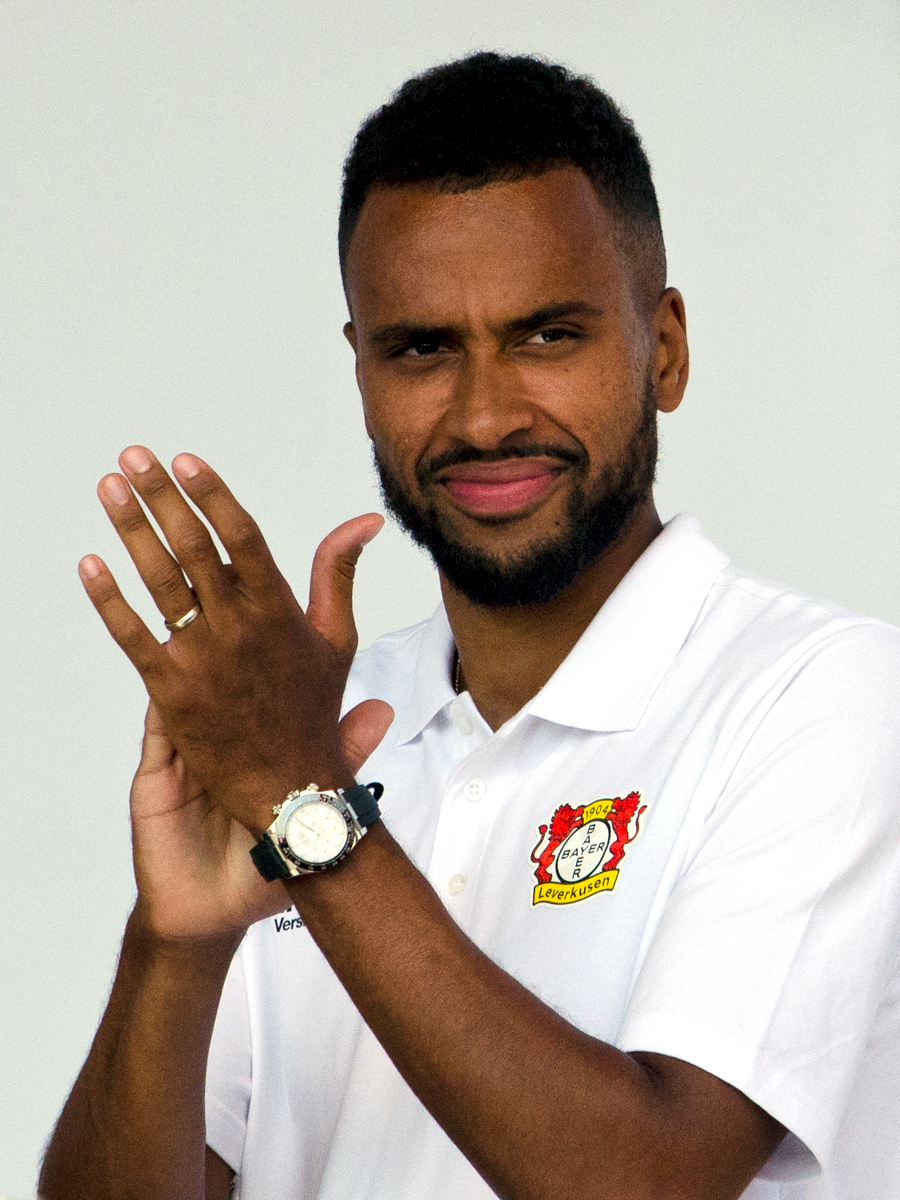
- Kiese Thelin with Bayer Leverkusen in 2018

Personal information
- Full name: Isaac Kiese Thelin
- Date of birth: 24 June 1992 (age 34)
- Place of birth: Örebro, Sweden
- Height: 1.89 m (6 ft 2 in)
- Position: Forward

Team information
- Current team: SV Ried
- Number: 92

Youth career
- 1997–2009: Karlslunds IF

Senior career*
Years	Team	Apps	(Gls)
2009–2011	Karlslunds IF	44	(18)
2011–2014	IFK Norrköping	48	(6)
2014	Malmö FF	14	(5)
2015–2017	Bordeaux	29	(3)
2017	→ Anderlecht (loan)	16	(1)
2017–2021	Anderlecht	17	(1)
2017–2018	→ Waasland-Beveren (loan)	33	(19)
2018–2019	→ Bayer Leverkusen (loan)	6	(0)
2020	→ Malmö FF (loan)	25	(14)
2021	→ Kasımpaşa (loan)	21	(9)
2021–2022	Baniyas	17	(6)
2022–2025	Malmö FF	93	(46)
2025–2026	Urawa Red Diamonds	20	(4)
2026–	SV Ried	0	(0)

International career
2009	Sweden U17	3	(1)
2014–2015	Sweden U21	11	(7)
2014–2024	Sweden	33	(5)
Medal record
Men's football
Representing Sweden
UEFA European Under-21 Championship
Winner	2015
- * Club domestic league appearances and goals as of 11:11, 10 September 2026 (UTC)

Isaac Kiese Thelin (born 24 June 1992) is a Swedish professional footballer who plays as a forward for SV Ried.

A full international from 2014 to 2024, Kiese Thelin won 33 caps for Sweden and represented his country at the 2018 FIFA World Cup.

== Club career ==
=== Early career ===
Kiese Thelin began his career at Karlslunds IF from Örebro, a club he had been playing football for since the age of five. He played from the club as they played in Sweden's Division 1, Division 2 and Division 3. In 2011, he transferred to newly promoted Allsvenskan side IFK Norrköping. Kiese Thelin made his breakthrough in the 2012 season when he appeared in eleven matches for the club and scored twice. For the 2013 season he increased his appearances to 25 and scored another four goals. After having appeared regularly during the beginning of the 2014 season, it was announced on 4 June 2014 that Kiese Thelin had signed a four-year contract with fellow Allsvenskan club and reigning champions Malmö FF.

=== Malmö FF ===
On 4 June 2014, it was announced that Kiese Thelin would transfer to Malmö FF. It was announced that Malmö FF were in negotiations with IFK Norrköping to complete the transfer in summer of 2014 instead of completing the transfer after the season when Kiese Thelin's contract ended. On 5 July 2014 it was confirmed by Malmö FF that Kiese Thelin would join the club on 15 July 2014. He made his debut for the club in the first leg of the second qualifying round to the 2014–15 UEFA Champions League against FK Ventspils on 16 July 2014. Kiese Thelin would prove to play a crucial part of the team that defended the Allsvenskan league title and qualified for the group stage of the 2014–15 UEFA Champions League. In his 14 league appearances for the club he scored five goals, the first against Kalmar FF in the away fixture on 19 July 2014. He also scored two important goals for the club in the UEFA Champions League qualifying campaign, the first in the away game against FK Ventspils on 23 July 2014 and the second in the away game against Sparta Prague on 29 July 2014. Overall Kiese Thelin participated in all of the club's 12 matches in the 2014–15 UEFA Champions League. After the season, he was nominated for newcomer of the year at Svenska idrottsgalan. On 20 January 2015 Malmö FF announced that they had reached a verbal agreement with Ligue 1 side Bordeaux for the transfer of Kiese Thelin.

=== Bordeaux ===
On 22 January 2015, Ligue 1 club Bordeaux confirmed the transfer of Kiese Thelin. He signed a contract lasting until 2019. He made his debut two days later in a goalless draw against SC Bastia, appearing in the whole match.

==== Loan to RSC Anderlecht ====
On 5 January 2017, the Swedish striker joined Belgian Jupiler Pro League giant Anderlecht on loan. He was resent to Anderlecht on 24 May for the following season.

=== Anderlecht ===
On 31 August 2017, RSC Anderlecht bought his rights from Bordeaux and loaned him to Waasland-Beveren.

==== Loan to Bayer Leverkusen ====
On 7 August 2018, Bayer 04 Leverkusen announced the signing on Kiese Thelin on a season-long loan, until 30 June 2019.

==== Loan to Malmö FF ====
On 9 January 2020, Kiese Thelin returned to former club Malmö FF on a season-long loan. On 8 November 2020 he scored his 13th Allsvenskan goal of the season in a 4–0 win against IK Sirius to help Malmö FF become Swedish Champions for the 21st time.

==== Loan to Kasımpaşa ====
Kiese Thelin signed for Turkish Süper Lig side Kasımpaşa on loan in January 2021.

=== Baniyas ===
In September 2021, Kiese Thelin signed with Baniyas.

=== Return to Malmö FF ===
Kiese Thelin spent 2021 in Turkey and the United Arab Emirates at Kasımpaşa and Baniyas respectively. Ahead of the 2022 Allsvenskan season, he then returned to Malmö FF on a free transfer, signing a four-year contract with the club. He went on to become top scorer of the 2023 Allsvenskan with 16 goals.

== International career ==
=== Youth ===
Kiese Thelin was selected for Sweden U17 in 2009, and won a total of three caps and scored once. Thelin was selected for Sweden U21 in 2014 and scored two goals in his first two appearances. In 2015, he played in all five games as Sweden won the 2015 UEFA European Under-21 Championship.

=== Senior ===
Kiese Thelin made his full international debut on 15 November 2014 against Montenegro, replacing Erkan Zengin in the 86th minute of a UEFA Euro 2016 qualifying game that ended 1–1. He scored his first international goal on 15 November 2016, in a friendly 2–0 win against Hungary. In May 2018, he was named in the Sweden national team's 23-man squad for the 2018 FIFA World Cup in Russia. He came on as a substitute in four of the games as Sweden reached the quarter-finals in a FIFA World Cup for the first time since 1994.

== Personal life ==
Kiese Thelin was born to a Swedish mother and a Congolese father. He is a Christian.

== Career statistics ==
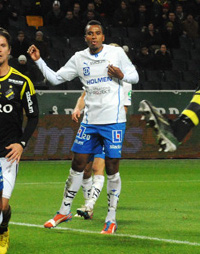
Kiese Thelin playing for IFK Norrköping in 2013

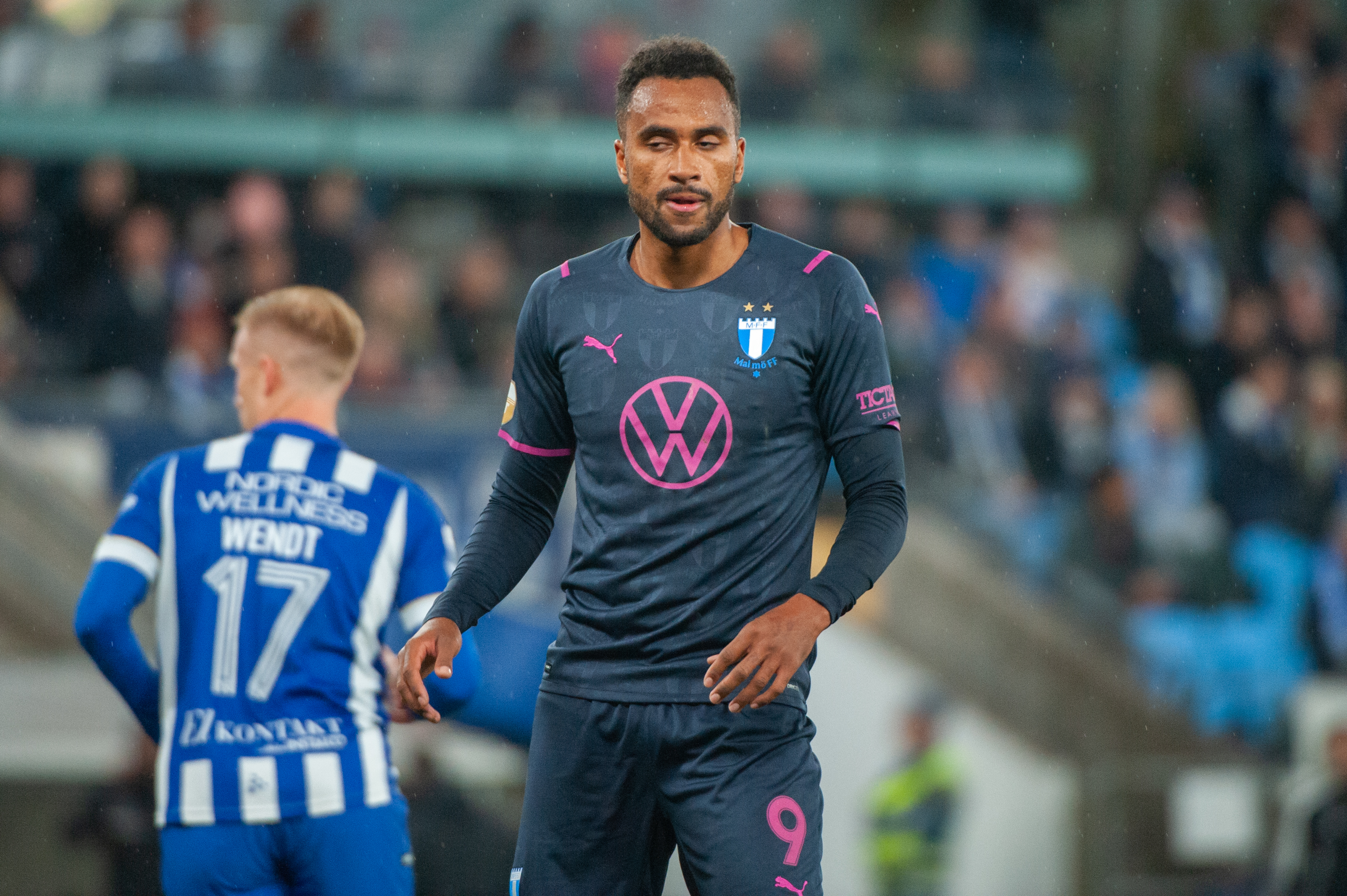
Kiese Thelin playing for Malmö FF in 2022

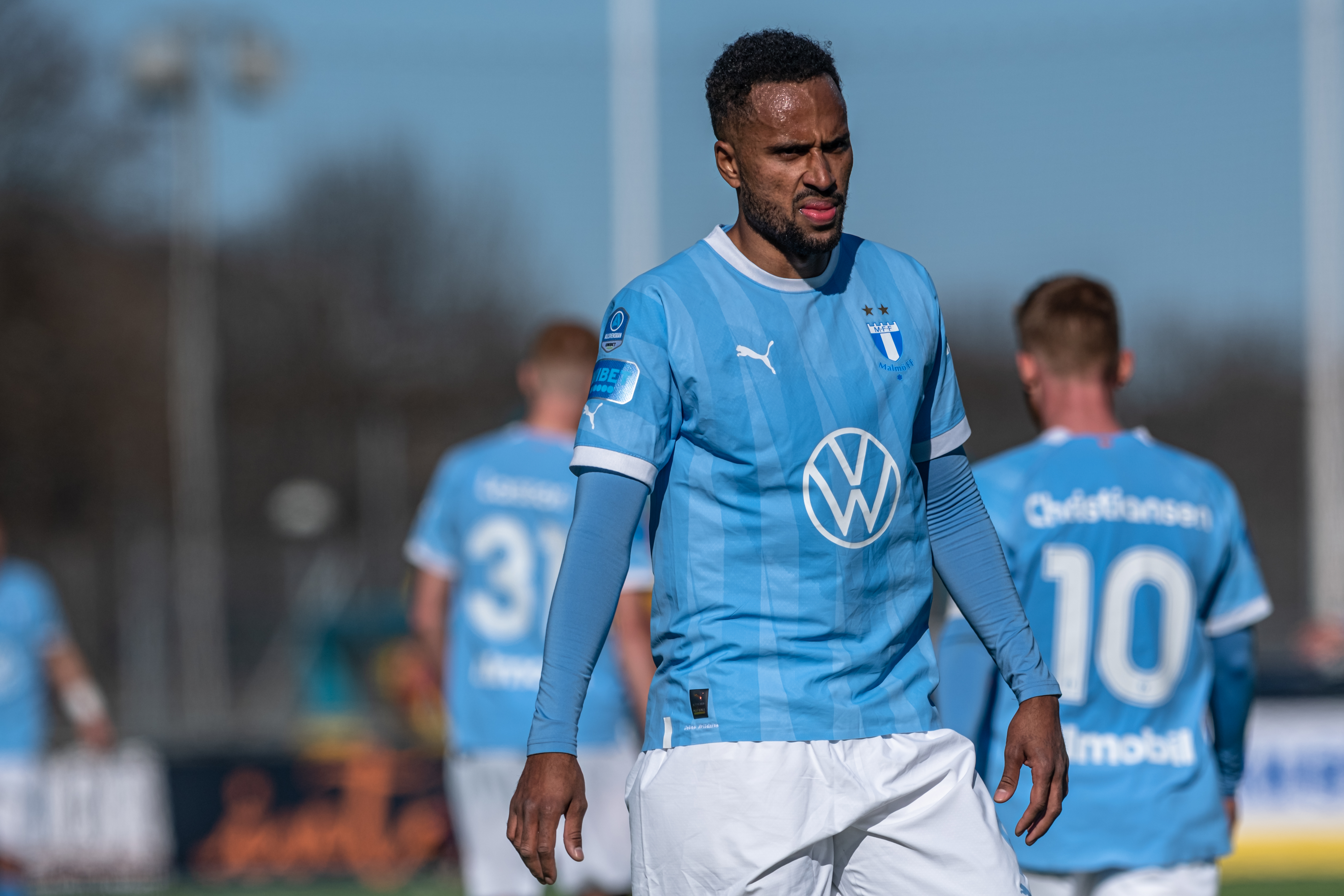
Kiese Thelin playing for Malmö FF in 2023

=== Club ===
As of match played 15 July 2025

Appearances and goals by club, season and competition
Club	Season	League			National cup (Note: Includes Svenska Cupen, Belgian Cup, DFB-Pokal, Turkish Cup, UAE President's Cup)		Continental		Other		Total	
Club	Season	Division	Apps	Goals	Apps	Goals	Apps	Goals	Apps	Goals	Apps	Goals
Karlslunds IF	2009	Division 1 Norra	6	0	—		—		—		6	0
Karlslunds IF	2010	Division 2 Södra Svealand	21	10	—		—		—		21	10
Karlslunds IF	2011	Division 3 Västra Svealand	17	8	1	0	—		—		18	8
Karlslunds IF	Total		44	18	1	0	0	0	0	0	45	18
IFK Norrköping	2011	Allsvenskan	0	0	0	0	—		—		0	0
IFK Norrköping	2012	Allsvenskan	11	2	1	0	—		—		12	2
IFK Norrköping	2013	Allsvenskan	25	4	4	0	—		—		29	4
IFK Norrköping	2014	Allsvenskan	12	0	2	0	—		—		14	0
IFK Norrköping	Total		48	6	7	0	0	0	0	0	55	6
Malmö FF	2014	Allsvenskan	14	5	0	0	12 (Note: Appearances in UEFA Champions League)	2	1 (Note: Appearance in Svenska Supercupen)	1	26	7
Malmö FF	Total		14	5	0	0	12	2	1	1	26	7
Bordeaux	2014–15	Ligue 1	15	1	—		—		—		15	1
Bordeaux	2015–16	Ligue 1	7	0	0	0	5 (Note: Appearances in UEFA Europa League)	1	—		12	1
Bordeaux	2016–17	Ligue 1	7	2	0	0	—		2 (Note: Appearances in Coupe de la Ligue)	0	9	2
Bordeaux	Total		29	3	0	0	5	1	2	0	36	4
Anderlecht (loan)	2016–17	First Division A	16	1	0	0	6	1	10 (Note: Appearances in First Division A play-offs)	1	32	3
Anderlecht	2017–18	First Division A	2	0	0	0	0	0	1 (Note: Appearance in Belgian Super Cup)	0	3	0
Anderlecht	2019–20	First Division A	10	0	2	1	—		—		12	1
Anderlecht	Total		28	1	2	1	6	1	11	1	47	4
Waasland-Beveren (loan)	2017–18	First Division A	25	16	3	0	—		8	3	36	19
Bayer Leverkusen (loan)	2018–19	Bundesliga	6	0	2	0	6	1	—		14	1
Malmö FF (loan)	2020	Allsvenskan	25	14	4	0	4	3	—		33	17
Kasımpaşa (loan)	2020–21	Süper Lig	21	9	1	0	–		–		22	9
Baniyas Club	2021–22	UAE Pro League	17	6	4	0	–		–		21	6
Malmö FF	2022	Allsvenskan	23	12	3	2	13 (Note: Three appearances in UEFA Champions League, ten appearances in Europa League)	3	–		39	17
Malmö FF	2023	Allsvenskan	28	16	5	4	–		–		33	20
Malmö FF	2024	Allsvenskan	26	15	7	0	11 (Note: Six appearances in UEFA Champions League, five appearances in Europa League)	0	–		44	15
Malmö FF	2025	Allsvenskan	16	3	0	0	1 (Note: One appearances in UEFA Champions League, five appearances in Europa League)	0	–		17	3
Malmö FF	Total		93	46	15	6	25	3	—		133	55
Career total			350	124	39	7	58	11	22	5	469	147

=== International ===
As of 12 January 2024

Appearances and goals by national team and year
National team	Year	Apps	Goals
Sweden	2014	2	0
Sweden	2015	5	0
Sweden	2016	3	1
Sweden	2017	7	1
Sweden	2018	12	1
Sweden	2019	0	0
Sweden	2020	0	0
Sweden	2021	3	1
Sweden	2022	0	0
Sweden	2023	0	0
Sweden	2024	1	1
Total		33	5

Scores and results list Sweden's goal tally first, score column indicates score after each Kiese Thelin goal

List of international goals scored by Isaac Kiese Thelin
No.	Date	Venue	Opponent	Score	Result	Competition	Ref.
1	15 November 2016	Ferencváros Stadion, Budapest, Hungary	Hungary	2–0	2–0	Friendly	
2	25 March 2017	Friends Arena, Solna, Sweden	Belarus	4–0	4–0	2018 FIFA World Cup qualification	
3	10 September 2018	Friends Arena, Solna, Sweden	Turkey	1–0	2–3	2018–19 UEFA Nations League B	
4	5 September 2021	Friends Arena, Solna, Sweden	Uzbekistan	2–0	2–1	Friendly	
5	12 January 2024	Stelios Kyriakides Stadium, Paphos, Cyprus	Estonia	2–1	2–1	Friendly	

== Honours ==
Karlslunds IF

- Division 3 Västra Svealand: 2011

Malmö FF

- Allsvenskan: 2014, 2020, 2023, 2024
- Svenska Cupen: 2021–22, 2023–24
- Svenska Supercupen: 2014

Anderlecht

- Belgian First Division: 2016–17
- Belgian Super Cup: 2017

Sweden U21

- UEFA European Under-21 Championship: 2015

Individual

- Allsvenskan top scorer: 2023
- Allsvenskan Forward of the Year: 2023
