= Selim Ilgaz =

Turkish footballer (born 1995)

Personal information
- Date of birth: 22 June 1995 (age 31)
- Place of birth: Montfermeil, France
- Height: 1.78 m (5 ft 10 in)
- Position: Winger

Team information
- Current team: Aliağa FK
- Number: 7

Youth career
- 2003–2010: Montfermeil
- 2010–2012: Sochaux

Senior career*
Years	Team	Apps	(Gls)
2012–2015	Sochaux II	41	(1)
2015–2016	Fatih Karagümrük	0	(0)
2015–2016	→ Kayseri Erciyesspor (loan)	16	(2)
2016–2021	Hatayspor	157	(26)
2021–2023	Manisa	23	(2)
2023	→ Çorum (loan)	14	(2)
2023–2024	Iğdır	14	(0)
2024	→ Ankara Keçiörengücü (loan)	13	(1)
2024–2025	Adana 01	16	(5)
2025	Kahramanmaraş İstiklal Spor	14	(4)
2025–2026	Cankaya	26	(7)
2026–	Aliağa FK	2	(0)
- * Club domestic league appearances and goals as of 1 October 2026

Selim Ilgaz (born 22 June 1995) is a French professional footballer who plays as a winger for TFF Second League club Aliağa FK.

== Career ==
Ilgaz is a youth product of his local side, and joined the youth academy of Sochaux. After training with the reserves of Sochaux, Ilgaz moved to Turkey joining Hatayspor in 2016. He helped them get promoted into the Süper Lig in 2020. Ilgaz made his professional debut with Hatayspor in a 2–0 Süper Lig win over defending champions İstanbul Başakşehir on 14 September 2020, scoring a goal in his debut.

== Personal life ==
Born in France, Ilgaz is of Turkish descent.
