= Yasin Dülger =

Turkish footballer

Personal information
- Date of birth: 24 October 1995 (age 31)
- Place of birth: Düzköy, Turkey
- Height: 1.78 m (5 ft 10 in)
- Position: Winger

Team information
- Current team: Sebatspor
- Number: 61

Youth career
- 2007–2012: Atakum Belediyespor
- 2012–2013: Boluspor

Senior career*
Years	Team	Apps	(Gls)
2013–2020	Boluspor	1	(0)
2015–2017	→ 24 Erzincanspor (loan)	81	(12)
2017–2018	→ Çorum FK (loan)	27	(1)
2018–2019	→ Nazilli Belediyespor (loan)	30	(14)
2019–2020	→ Nevşehir Belediyespor (loan)	18	(2)
2020–2022	Kasımpaşa	11	(0)
2021–2022	→ Şanlıurfaspor (loan)	14	(1)
2022	→ Ergene Velimeşe (loan)	13	(0)
2022–2023	24 Erzincanspor	33	(7)
2023–2024	Diyarbekirspor	28	(7)
2024–2025	24 Erzincanspor	27	(10)
2025–	Sebatspor	24	(11)
- * Club domestic league appearances and goals as of 1 October 2026

Yasin Dülger (born 24 October 1995) is a Turkish football player who plays as a winger for Sebatspor in the TFF Second League.

== Professional career ==
A youth product of Boluspor, Dülger joined Kasımpaşa on 2 September 2020 after a series of loans. Dülger made his professional debut with Kasımpaşa in a 1-0 Süper Lig loss to Hatayspor on 26 September 2020.
