= Rayane Aabid =

French footballer (born 1992)

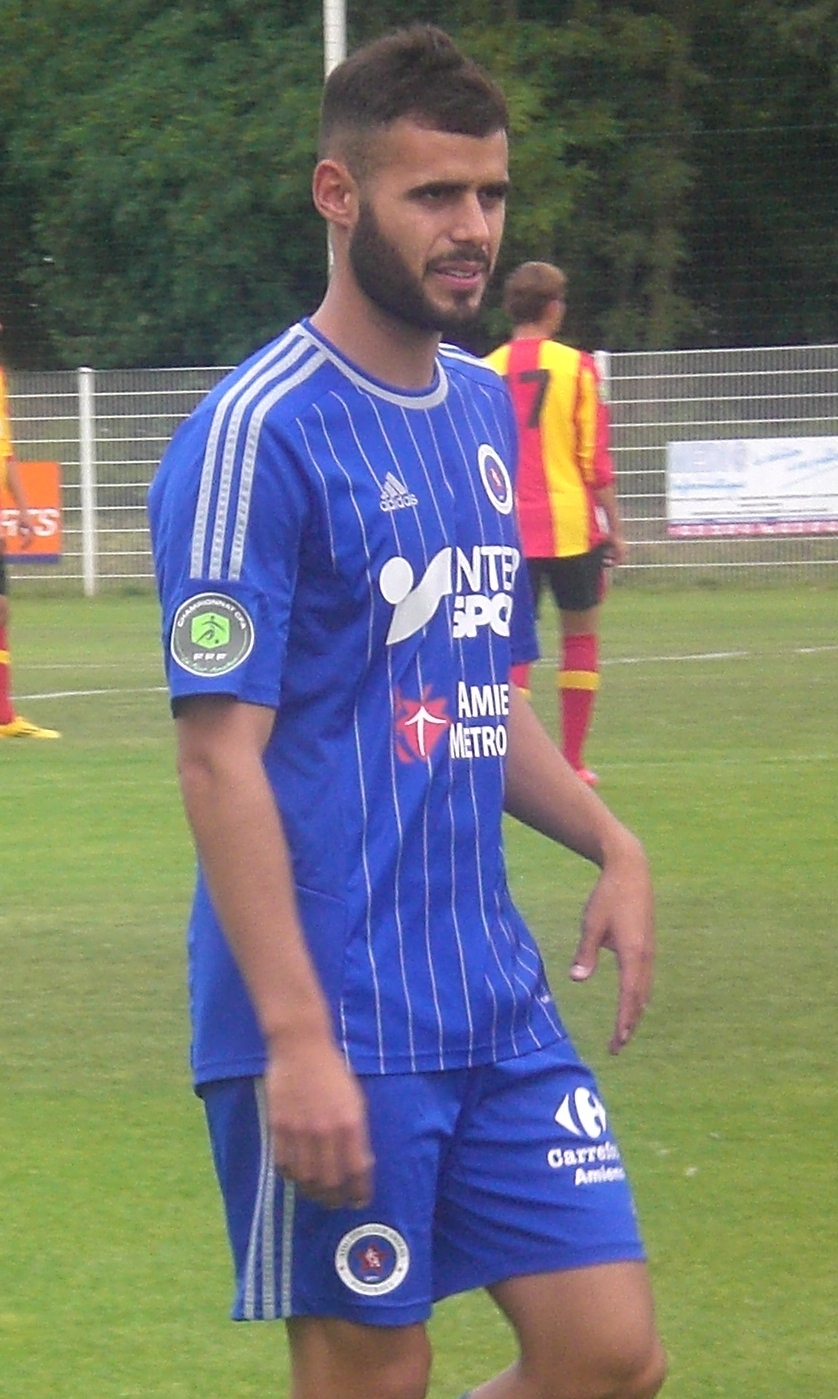

Personal information
- Date of birth: 19 January 1992 (age 34)
- Place of birth: Villeneuve-d'Ascq, France
- Height: 1.78 m (5 ft 10 in)
- Position: Winger

Team information
- Current team: RS Berkane
- Number: 10

Youth career
- 2013–2014: JA Armentières

Senior career*
Years	Team	Apps	(Gls)
2014–2015	Amiens	60	(5)
2015–2017	Béziers	29	(4)
2017–2018	Paris FC	2	(0)
2017–2018	Paris FC II	8	(0)
2018–2019	Béziers	42	(2)
2019–2021	Hatayspor	71	(4)
2021–2022	Yeni Malatyaspor	23	(1)
2022	Kasımpaşa	12	(0)
2022–2024	Hatayspor	32	(1)
2024–2025	Sakaryaspor	34	(0)
2025–	RS Berkane	6	(0)
- * Club domestic league appearances and goals as of 9 November 2025

Rayane Aabid (born 19 January 1992) is a French professional footballer who plays as a midfielder for Moroccan club RS Berkane.

== Professional career ==
Aabid signed for Paris FC on 23 June 2017, after a meteoric rise from the lower French divisions. Aabid made his professional debut with Paris FC in a 0–0 Ligue 2 tie with Clermont Foot on 28 July 2017.

== Personal life ==
Born in France, Aabid holds both French and Moroccan nationalities.
