= Abdurrahman Canlı =

Turkish footballer

Personal information
- Date of birth: 4 May 1997 (age 29)
- Place of birth: Karayazı, Erzurum, Turkey
- Height: 1.81 m (5 ft 11 in)
- Position: Midfielder

Team information
- Current team: Kütahyaspor
- Number: 66

Youth career
- 2007–2016: Fenerbahçe

Senior career*
Years	Team	Apps	(Gls)
2016–2019	Fenerbahçe	0	(0)
2017	→ Sakaryaspor (loan)	5	(0)
2017–2019	→ Tarsus (loan)	65	(3)
2019–2022	Hatayspor	12	(1)
2019–2020	→ 24 Erzincanspor (loan)	25	(2)
2021–2022	→ Boluspor (loan)	33	(1)
2022–2023	Bodrumspor	7	(0)
2023	→ Adanaspor (loan)	3	(0)
2023	→ Boluspor (loan)	10	(0)
2023–2024	İskenderunspor	31	(2)
2024–2025	68 Aksaray Belediyespor	27	(2)
2025–2026	Muğlaspor	33	(4)
2026–	Kütahyaspor	7	(0)

International career^{‡}
2012	Turkey U15	4	(0)
2012	Turkey U16	4	(0)
2014	Turkey U18	2	(0)
2015–2016	Turkey U19	8	(1)
- * Club domestic league appearances and goals as of 14 November 2026 ‡ National team caps and goals as of 19:35, 8 May 2021 (UTC)

Abdurrahman Canlı (born 4 May 1997) is a Turkish professional footballer who plays as a midfielder for TFF 2. Lig club Kütahyaspor.

== Professional career ==
A youth product of Fenerbahçe, Canlı made his professional debut with them in a 2–1 Turkish Cup loss to Gençlerbirliği S.K. on 30 November 2016. He went on successive loans with Sakaryaspor and Tarsus. On 3 September 2019, he signed with Hatayspor. He went on loan to 24 Erzincanspor for the 2019–20 season. He debuted in the Süper Lig with Hatayspor in a 1–0 win over Kasımpaşa S.K. on 26 September 2021.

On 9 July 2022, Canlı signed with Bodrumspor.

== International career ==
Canlı is a youth international for Turkey, having represented the Turkey U15, U16, U18, and U19 teams.
