= Soner Örnek =

Turkish footballer

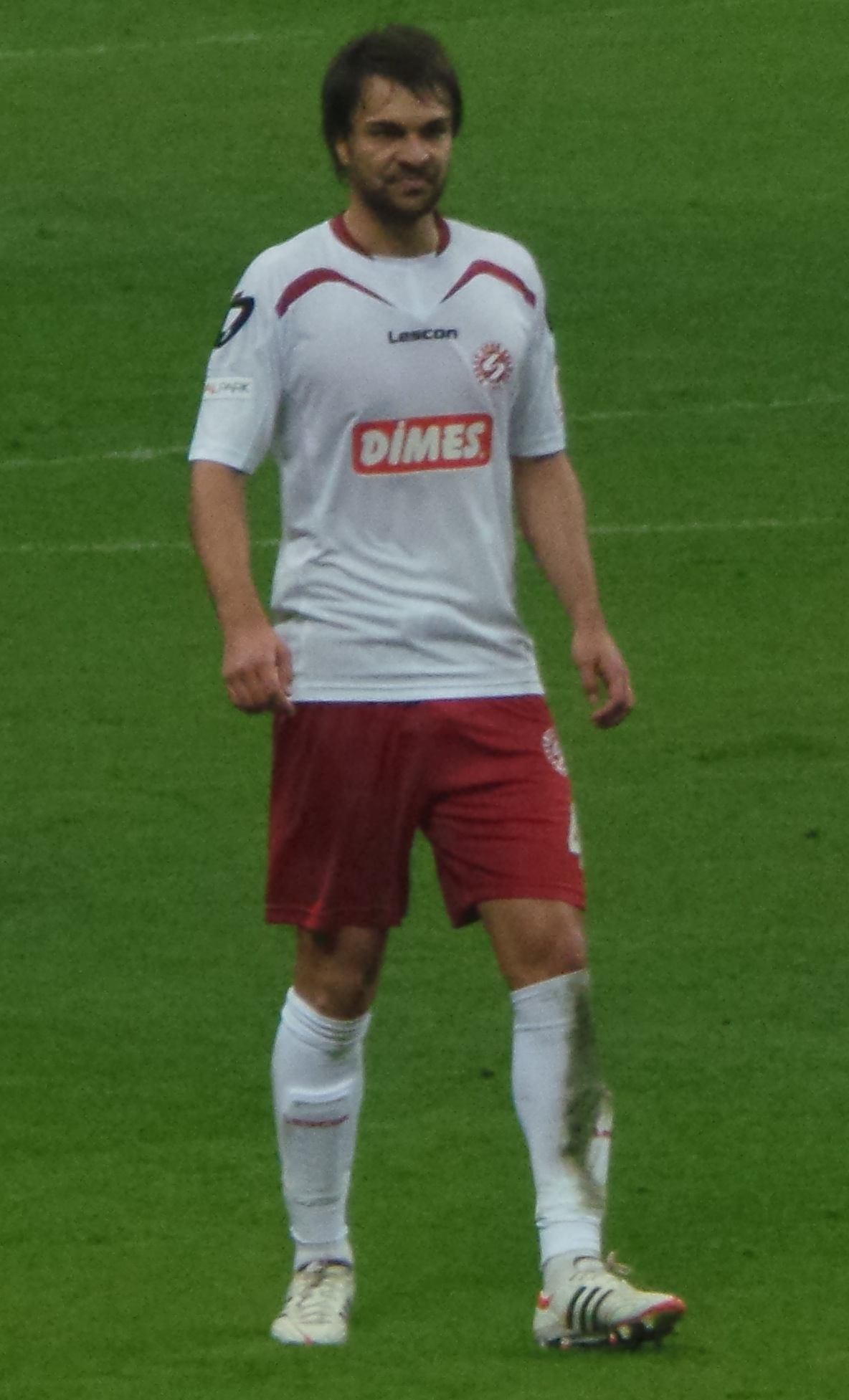

Personal information
- Date of birth: 28 February 1989 (age 37)
- Place of birth: Gaziantep, Turkey
- Height: 1.92 m (6 ft 3 1/2 in)
- Position: Centre back

Youth career
- Gaziantepspor

Senior career*
Years	Team	Apps	(Gls)
2008–2012	Gaziantepspor	4	(1)
2009	→ Şanlıurfaspor (loan)	13	(2)
2012–2013	Eyüpspor	11	(0)
2013–2015	Tokatspor	63	(6)
2015–2016	Gaziantep BB	0	(0)
2016–2021	Hatayspor	90	(8)
2021–2022	Iğdır	15	(3)

International career^{‡}
2007	Turkey U19	6	(0)
2008	Turkey U20	1	(0)
- * Club domestic league appearances and goals as of 7 May 2022 ‡ National team caps and goals as of 27 November 2008

Soner Örnek (born 28 February 1989) is a Turkish footballer.
