= Mesut Çaytemel =

Turkish footballer (born 1984)

Personal information
- Date of birth: 24 April 1984 (age 42)
- Place of birth: Bursa, Turkey
- Height: 1.74 m (5 ft 9 in)
- Position: Left back

Youth career
- 1999: Bursaspor
- 1999–2001: Sırameşelerspor
- 2001–2003: Bursa Merinosspor

Senior career*
Years	Team	Apps	(Gls)
2003–2004	Bursa Merinosspor	21	(1)
2004–2007	İnegölspor	94	(7)
2007–2008	Antalyaspor	19	(1)
2008–2009	Samsunspor	7	(0)
2009–2010	Altay	44	(0)
2010–2012	Giresunspor	51	(2)
2012–2013	Boluspor	8	(0)
2013–2014	Altay	27	(6)
2014–2015	Orduspor	8	(0)
2015–2021	Hatayspor	194	(13)
2021–2022	Iğdır	20	(1)
- * Club domestic league appearances and goals as of 7 May 2022

Mesut Çaytemel (born 24 April 1984) is a Turkish professional footballer who plays as a left back.

== Professional career ==
Çaytemel began playing football in local clubs, and in various amateur teams in Turkey. He eventually worked his way up to the TFF First League, and transferred to Hatayspor in 2015. Çaytemel captained Hatayspor as they were promoted into the Süper Lig for the first time in their history in 2020. Çaytemel made his professional debut with Hatayspor in a 2–0 Süper Lig win over defending champions İstanbul Başakşehir on 14 September 2020, at the age of 36.
