= 2019–20 Fenerbahçe S.K. season =

Fenerbahçe
2019–20 season
- President: Ali Koç
- Head coach: Ersun Yanal (until 3 March 2020); Tahir Karapınar (caretaker, from 9 June 2020)
- Stadium: Şükrü Saracoğlu Stadium
- Süper Lig: 7th
- Turkish Cup: Semi-finals
- Top goalscorer: League: Vedat Muriqi (15 goals); All: Vedat Muriqi (17 goals)
- Highest home attendance: 45,096 vs. Galatasaray (23 February 2020)
- Lowest home attendance: 24,718 vs. Denizlispor (7 March 2020)
- Average home league attendance: 38,143
Home colours	Away colours	Third colours

The 2019–20 season was the 113th season in the existence of Fenerbahçe S.K. and the club's 62nd consecutive season in the top flight of Turkish football. In addition to the domestic league, Fenerbahçe participated in this season's editions of the Turkish Cup.

== Club ==
=== Board of directors ===
You can see the fields of the board members by moving the pointer to the dotted field.

Position	Staff
Chairman	(Turkey) Ali Koç
Deputy Chairman	(Turkey) Semih Özsoy
Vice-Chairman	(Turkey) Mehmet Burhan Karaçam
Vice-Chairman	(Turkey) Erol Bilecik
Secretary General	(Turkey) Burak Çağlan Kızılhan
Board Member	(Turkey) Sevil Zeynep Becan
Board Member	(Turkey) Şaban Erdikler
Board Member	(Turkey) Mustafa Tankut Turnaoğlu
Board Member	(Turkey) Fethi Pekin
Board Member	(Turkey) Turhan Şahin
Board Member	(Turkey) Mustafa Kemal Danabaş
Board Member	(Turkey) Acar Sertaç Komsuoğlu
Board Member	(Turkey) Simla Türker Bayazıt
Board Member	(Turkey) Ömer Okan
Board Member	(Turkey) Alper Pirşen
Associate Member	(Turkey) Ozan Korman Tarman
Associate Member	(Turkey) Metin Sipahioğlu
Associate Member	(Turkey) Selahattin Baki
Associate Member	(Turkey) Muhittin İlker Dinçay
Associate Member	(Turkey) Esra Nazlı Ercan

Last updated: 31 December 2019
Source: Fenerbahce.org

=== Staff ===
The list of the staff is below.

Field	Name
Administrative manager	(Turkey) Volkan Ballı
Manager	(Turkey) Tahir Karapınar
Assistant manager	(Turkey) Volkan Demirel
Assistant manager	(Turkey) Mehmet Aurélio
Assistant manager	(Turkey) Zeki Murat Göle
Performance trainer	(Turkey) Niyazi Eniseler
Performance trainer	(Turkey) Murat Bel
Goalkeeper coach	(Germany) Marco Knoop
Individual Performance Specialist	(Turkey) Fatih Yıldız
Individual Performance Specialist	(Turkey) Halil Filik
Analyst	(Turkey) Beri Pardo
Analyst	(Turkey) Melikşah Zengin
Analyst	(Turkey) Mehmet Turan Demir
Scouting Staff Leader	(Turkey) Serhat Pekmezci
Doctor	(Turkey) Prof. Dr. Burak Kunduracıoğlu
Physiotherapist	(Turkey) Umut Şahin
Physiotherapist	(Turkey) Ata Özgür Ercan
Physiotherapist	(Turkey) Bülent Uyar
Masseur	(Turkey) Fuat Öz
Masseur	(Turkey) Murat Çalışkan
Masseur	(Turkey) Özkan Alaca
Media Specialist	(Turkey) Çağrı Çobanoğlu
Translator	(Turkey) Görkem Ekal
Translator	(Turkey) Sinan Levi
Translator	(Turkey) Saruhan Karaman
Dietitian	(Turkey) Şengül Sangu Talak

=== Facilities ===
Position	Staff
Stadium	(Turkey) Şükrü Saracoğlu Stadium
Training facility	(Turkey) Lefter Küçükandonyadis Tesisleri
Training facility	(Turkey) Faruk Ilgaz Tesisleri
Training facility	(Turkey) Düzce Topuk Yaylası Tesisleri
Training facility	(Turkey) Can Bartu Tesisleri
Training facility	(Turkey) Fikirtepe Tesisleri

== Kits ==
Fenerbahçe's 2019–20 kits, manufactured by Adidas, were introduced on 18 July 2019.

- Supplier: Adidas
- Main sponsor: Avis
- Back sponsor: Halley
- Sleeve sponsor: HeForShe
- Short sponsor: Aygaz

Home
Away
Third
Home alt.
Away alt.
Third alt.
Third alt.2
Goalkeeper 1
Goalkeeper 2
Goalkeeper 3

=== Training ===
Players	Staff

== Players ==
=== First-team squad ===
N	Pos.	Nat.	Name	Age	EU	Since	App	Goals	Ends	Transfer fee	Notes
2	DF	(Guinea)	Simon Falette	28	EU	2020 (Winter)	12	0	2020	Loan	Second nationality: French
3	DF	(Turkey)	Hasan Ali Kaldırım (Vice-Captain)	30	EU	2012	246	8	2020	€3.75M	Second nationality: German
5	MF	(Turkey)	Emre Belözoğlu (Captain)	39	Non-EU	2019	227	33	2020	Free	
6	MF	(Germany)	Tolgay Arslan	29	EU	2019 (Winter)	33	2	2022	€3.00M	Second nationality: Turkish
7	MF	(Turkey)	Ozan Tufan	25	Non-EU	2015	132	15	2023	€7.00M	
8	MF	(Turkey)	Mehmet Ekici	30	EU	2017	49	5	2020	Free	Second nationality: German
9	FW	(Turkey)	Mevlüt Erdinç	33	EU	2019	19	4	2021	Free	Second nationality: French
14	MF	(Turkey)	Tolga Ciğerci	28	EU	2018	33	2	2020	Free	Second nationality: German
15	DF	(Turkey)	Serdar Aziz	29	Non-EU	2019 (Winter)	33	5	2022	Free	
16	MF	(Netherlands)	Ferdi Kadıoğlu	20	EU	2018	32	6	2022	€1.40M	Second nationality: Turkish
17	MF	(Morocco)	Nabil Dirar	34	EU	2017	89	8	2022	€2.00M	Second nationality: Belgian
18	DF	(Turkey)	Sadık Çiftpınar	27	Non-EU	2019 (Winter)	19	2	2022	Free	
19	FW	(Iran)	Allahyar Sayyadmanesh	19	Non-EU	2019	3	0	2024	Free	
20	MF	(Brazil)	Luiz Gustavo	33	Non-EU	2019	32	3	2023	€6.00M	
21	MF	(Slovenia)	Miha Zajc	26	EU	2019 (Winter)	27	4	2023	€3.50M	
23	MF	(Turkey)	Deniz Türüç	27	EU	2019	35	6	2022	€2.00M	Second nationality: Dutch
24	MF	(Cape Verde)	Garry Rodrigues	29	EU	2019	29	4	2021	Loan	Second nationality: Dutch
25	MF	(Brazil)	Jailson	24	Non-EU	2018	63	3	2022	€4.00M	
26	MF	(Turkey)	Alper Potuk	29	Non-EU	2013	214	17	2022	€7.50M	
28	DF	(Turkey)	Murat Sağlam	22	EU	2019	5	0	2022	Free	Second nationality: German
30	MF	(Turkey)	Ömer Faruk Beyaz	16	Non-EU	2020	5	0	2021	Youth system	
35	GK	(Turkey)	Harun Tekin	31	Non-EU	2018	39	0	2021	€2.50M	
54	GK	(Turkey)	Erten Ersu	26	Non-EU	2013	4	0	2020	Youth system	
94	FW	(Kosovo)	Vedat Muriqi	26	Non-EU	2019	36	17	2023	€3.50M	Other nationalities: Albanian, Turkish
98	GK	(Turkey)	Altay Bayındır	22	Non-EU	2019	35	0	2023	€1.50M	
Players sold or loaned out after the start of the season
4	DF	(Chile)	Mauricio Isla	31	Non-EU	2017	91	0	2020	Free	
10	MF	(Germany)	Max Kruse	32	EU	2019	23	7	2022	Free	
11	FW	(Nigeria)	Victor Moses	29	Non-EU	2019 (Winter)	23	5	2020	Loan	
32	DF	(Denmark)	Mathias Jørgensen	29	EU	2019	19	3	2022	€2.00M	Second nationality: Gambian
34	DF	(France)	Adil Rami	34	EU	2019	7	0	2020	Free	Second nationality: Moroccan

- Last updated: 25 July 2020
- Source: Fenerbahce.org
- Ordered by squad number.

== Transfers ==
=== In ===
No.	Pos.	Nat.	Name	Age	Moving from	Type	Transfer window	Ends	Transfer fee	Source
	MF	(Turkey)	Barış Alıcı	22	Yeni Malatyaspor	End of loan	Summer	2022	Free	
60	MF	(Turkey)	Samed Karakoç	22	Tarsus İdman Yurdu	End of loan	Summer	2020	Free	
39	FW	(Turkey)	Ahmethan Köse	22	Kırklarelispor	End of loan	Summer	2020	Free	
20	DF	(Mexico)	Diego Reyes	26	(Spain) Leganés	End of loan	Summer	2020	Free	
7	MF	(Turkey)	Ozan Tufan	24	Alanyaspor	End of loan	Summer	2020	Free	
28	DF	(Turkey)	Murat Sağlam	21	(Germany) VfL Wolfsburg II	End of loan	Summer	2022	Free	Fenerbahce.org
10	FW	(Germany)	Max Kruse	31	(Germany) Werder Bremen	End of contract	Summer	2022	Free	Fenerbahce.org
19	FW	(Iran)	Allahyar Sayyadmanesh	18	(Iran) Esteghlal	Transfer	Summer	2024	€0.75M	Fenerbahce.org
5	MF	(Turkey)	Emre Belözoğlu	38	İstanbul Başakşehir	End of contract	Summer	2020	Free	Fenerbahce.org
94	FW	(Kosovo)	Vedat Muriqi	25	Çaykur Rizespor	Transfer	Summer	2023	€3.50M	Fenerbahce.org
98	GK	(Turkey)	Altay Bayındır	21	Ankaragücü	Transfer	Summer	2023	€1.50M	Fenerbahce.org
	DF	(Turkey)	Yasir Subaşı	23	Ümraniyespor	Transfer	Summer	2021	₺1.00M	Fenerbahce.org
24	MF	(Cape Verde)	Garry Rodrigues	28	(Saudi Arabia) Al-Ittihad	Loan	Summer	2021	Free	Fenerbahce.org
23	MF	(Turkey)	Deniz Türüç	26	Kayserispor	Transfer	Summer	2022	€2.00M	Fenerbahce.org
32	DF	(Denmark)	Mathias Jørgensen	29	(England) Huddersfield Town	Transfer	Summer	2022	€2.00M	Fenerbahce.org
34	DF	(France)	Adil Rami	33	(France) Marseille	Transfer	Summer	2020	Free	Fenerbahce.org
9	FW	(Turkey)	Mevlüt Erdinç	32	İstanbul Başakşehir	Transfer	Summer	2021	Free	Fenerbahce.org
20	MF	(Brazil)	Luiz Gustavo	32	(France) Marseille	Transfer	Summer	2023	€6.00M	Fenerbahce.org
2	DF	(Guinea)	Simon Falette	27	(Germany) Eintracht Frankfurt	Loan	Winter	2020	Free	Fenerbahce.org
	MF	(Turkey)	Barış Alıcı	22	Çaykur Rizespor	End of loan	Winter	2022	Free	Fenerbahce.org
19	FW	(Iran)	Allahyar Sayyadmanesh	18	İstanbulspor	End of loan	Winter	2024	Free	

=== Out ===
No.	Pos.	Nat.	Name	Age	Moving to	Type	Transfer window	Transfer fee	Source
31	FW	(Algeria)	Islam Slimani	31	(England) Leicester City	End of loan	Summer	Free	
20	MF	(Ghana)	André Ayew	29	(England) Swansea City	End of loan	Summer	Free	
39	MF	(Algeria)	Yassine Benzia	24	(France) Lille	End of loan	Summer	Free	
28	MF	(France)	Mathieu Valbuena	34	(Greece) Olympiacos	End of contract	Summer	Free	Olympiacos.org
9	FW	(Spain)	Roberto Soldado	34	(Spain) Granada	End of contract	Summer	Free	Granadacf.es
1	GK	(Turkey)	Volkan Demirel	37	Retired	Retirement	Summer	Free	Fenerbahce.org
33	DF	(Russia)	Roman Neustädter	31	(Russia) Dynamo Moscow	End of contract	Summer	Free	Fcdynamo.ru
6	DF	(Turkey)	İsmail Köybaşı	29	(Spain) Granada	End of contract	Summer	Free	Granadacf.es
37	DF	(Slovakia)	Martin Škrtel	34	(Italy) Atalanta	End of contract	Summer	Free	Atalanta.it
5	MF	(Turkey)	Mehmet Topal	33	İstanbul Başakşehir	Mutual agreement	Summer	Free	Fenerbahce.org
19	DF	(Turkey)	Şener Özbayraklı	29	Galatasaray	End of contract	Summer	Free	Galatasaray.org
	DF	(Turkey)	Yasir Subaşı	23	Kayserispor	Transfer	Summer	₺3.80M	Kayserispor.org.tr
66	MF	(Turkey)	Oğuz Kağan Güçtekin	20	Çaykur Rizespor	Loan	Summer	Free	
39	FW	(Turkey)	Ahmethan Köse	22	Samsunspor	Transfer	Summer	Undisclosed	Samsunspor.org.tr
23	GK	(Turkey)	Berke Özer	19	(Belgium) Westerlo	Loan	Summer	Free	Fenerbahce.org
99	MF	(North Macedonia)	Eljif Elmas	19	(Italy) Napoli	Transfer	Summer	€16M	Fenerbahce.org
24	MF	(Turkey)	Barış Alıcı	22	Çaykur Rizespor	Loan	Summer	Free	Fenerbahce.org
22	FW	(Switzerland)	Michael Frey	25	(Germany) 1. FC Nürnberg	Loan	Summer	€0.10M	Fenerbahce.org
20	DF	(Mexico)	Diego Reyes	26	(Mexico) Tigres UANL	Mutual agreement	Summer	Free	Fenerbahce.org
13	GK	(Cameroon)	Carlos Kameni	35		Mutual agreement	Summer	Free	Fenerbahce.org
19	FW	(Iran)	Allahyar Sayyadmanesh	18	İstanbulspor	Loan	Summer	Free	Fenerbahce.org
11	MF	(Nigeria)	Victor Moses	29	(Italy) Internazionale	Mutual agreement	Winter	Free	Inter.it
32	DF	(Denmark)	Mathias Jørgensen	29	(Germany) Fortuna Düsseldorf	Loan	Winter	Free	F95.de
	MF	(Turkey)	Barış Alıcı	22	(Belgium) Westerlo	Loan	Winter	Free	Fenerbahce.org
34	DF	(France)	Adil Rami	34	(Russia) Sochi	Mutual agreement	Mid-season	Free	Fenerbahce.org
4	DF	(Chile)	Mauricio Isla	31	(Brazil) Flamengo	Mutual agreement	Mid-season	Free	Fenerbahce.org
10	MF	(Germany)	Max Kruse	32	(Germany) Union Berlin	Contract termination	Mid-season	Free	Fenerbahce.org

Total spending: ▼€15.75M – ₺1M
Total income: ▲€16.1M – ₺3.8M
Expenditure: ▲€0.35M
▲ ₺2.8M

== Pre-season and friendlies ==
Win Draw Loss

=== Pre-season ===
13 July 2019 Friendly	Boluspor	0–2	Fenerbahçe	Bolu
19:00 TRT (UTC+3)	Can (yellow card) 26'	Report	Moses 10'; Ciğerci 65' (pen.)	Stadium: Bolu Atatürk Stadium

19 July 2019 Friendly	Fenerbahçe	2–0	Bursaspor	Istanbul
18:30 TRT (UTC+3)	Muriqi 45', 51'	Report		Stadium: Can Bartu Tesisleri; Referee: Volkan Bayarslan

22 July 2019 Friendly	VfL Wolfsburg (Germany)	1–1	(Turkey) Fenerbahçe	Kapfenberg, Austria
18:30 CEST (UTC+2)	Mbabu (yellow card) 35'; Bruma (yellow card) 57'; Weghorst 63'	Report	Muriqi 25'; Aziz (yellow card) 35'; Kadıoğlu (yellow card) 87'	Stadium: Franz Fekete Stadium

25 July 2019 Friendly	Hertha BSC (Germany)	2–1	(Turkey) Fenerbahçe	Hartberg, Austria
18:30 CEST (UTC+2)	Redan 58'; Ibišević 81'	Report	Sağlam (yellow card) 62'; Sayyadmanesh 82'; Tunç (yellow card) 86'	Stadium: Profertil Arena Hartberg

30 July 2019 AC SF	Bayern Munich (Germany)	6–1	(Turkey) Fenerbahçe	Munich, Germany
20:30 CEST (UTC+2)	Sanches 22'; Goretzka 28'; Müller 31', 44' (pen.), 58'; Coman 40'	Report	Isla (yellow card) 43'; Kruse 64'; Sağlam (yellow card) 81'	Stadium: Allianz Arena; Referee: Felix Brych (Germany)

31 July 2019 AC 3rd	Real Madrid (Spain)	5–3	(Turkey) Fenerbahçe	Munich, Germany
18:00 CEST (UTC+2)	Benzema 12', 27', 53'; Nacho 62'; De la Fuente (yellow card) 70'; Modrić (yellow card) 78'; Mariano 79'	Report	Rodrigues 6'; Dirar 34'; Tufan 59'; Sayyadmanesh (yellow card) 89'	Stadium: Allianz Arena; Referee: Benjamin Cortus (Germany)

7 August 2019 Friendly	Fenerbahçe (Turkey)	2–2	(Italy) Cagliari	Istanbul
20:30 TRT (UTC+3)	Belözoğlu 35'; Tufan 45+1'	Report	Nainggolan (yellow card) 33'; Han 54'; João Pedro 63' (pen.); Cigarini (yellow card) 82'; Ioniță (yellow card) 90'; Deiola (yellow card) 90+2'	Stadium: Şükrü Saracoğlu Stadium

10 August 2019 Cumhuriyet Kupası	Sivasspor	2–1	Fenerbahçe	Sivas
20:00 TRT (UTC+3)	Osmanpaşa 17'; Yandaş 38' (yellow card) 55'; Marcelo Goiano (yellow card) 90+3'	Report	Akbulut (yellow card) 21'; Kruse 49'; Potuk (yellow card) 78'	Stadium: New 4 Eylül Stadium

=== Mid-season ===
8 September 2019 Friendly	Bursaspor	2–1	Fenerbahçe	Bursa
20:00 TRT (UTC+3)	Altıparmak 4'; Kapacak 43'; Akgün (yellow card) 55'	Report	Çiftpınar (yellow card) 54'; Yıldız (yellow card) 78'; Erdinç 87'; Köksal (yellow card) 88'	Stadium: Bursa Büyükşehir Belediye Stadium

== Competitions ==
=== Overview ===
Competition	First match	Last match	Starting round	Final position	Record							
Competition	First match	Last match	Starting round	Final position	Pld	W	D	L	GF	GA	GD	Win %
Süper Lig	19 August 2019	25 July 2020	Matchday 1	7th	34	15	8	11	58	46	+12	44.12
Turkish Cup	30 October 2019	16 June 2020	Fourth round	Semi-finals	9	6	1	2	17	6	+11	66.67
Total					43	21	9	13	75	52	+23	48.84

Last updated: 25 July 2020
Source: Competitions

=== Süper Lig ===
==== League table ====
Pos	Team	Pld	W	D	L	GF	GA	GD	Pts	Qualification or relegation
5	Alanyaspor	34	16	9	9	61	37	+24	57	Qualification for the Europa League third qualifying round
6	Galatasaray	34	15	11	8	55	37	+18	56	Qualification for the Europa League second qualifying round
7	Fenerbahçe	34	15	8	11	58	46	+12	53	
8	Gaziantep	34	11	13	10	49	50	−1	46	
9	Antalyaspor	34	11	12	11	41	52	−11	45	

Source: Süper Lig, Soccerway
Rules for classification: 1) Points; 2) Head-to-head points; 3) Head-to-head goal difference; 4) Head-to-head goals scored; 5) Goal difference; 6) Goals scored; 7) Play-off.

==== Results summary ====
Overall								Home						Away					
Pld	W	D	L	GF	GA	GD	Pts	W	D	L	GF	GA	GD	W	D	L	GF	GA	GD
34	15	8	11	58	46	+12	53	11	3	3	41	22	+19	4	5	8	17	24	−7

Last updated: 25 July 2020.
Source: TFF.org

Pld = Matches played; W = Matches won; D = Matches drawn; L = Matches lost; GF = Goals for; GA = Goals against; GD = Goal difference; Pts = Points

==== Results by round ====
Round	1	2	3	4	5	6	7	8	9	10	11	12	13	14	15	16	17	18	19	20	21	22	23	24	25	26	27	28	29	30	31	32	33	34
Ground	H	A	H	A	H	A	H	A	H	A	H	A	A	H	A	H	A	A	H	A	H	A	H	A	H	A	H	A	H	H	A	H	A	H
Result	W	W	D	L	W	D	L	W	W	L	W	D	D	W	L	W	W	W	W	L	D	L	L	D	D	L	W	L	W	W	D	L	L	W
Position	1	1	2	3	2	2	5	3	2	4	2	4	6	5	5	4	4	4	2	5	6	6	6	7	7	7	7	7	6	6	7	7	7	7

Updated to match(es) played on 25 July 2020. Source: TFF.org
A = Away; H = Home; W = Win; D = Draw; L = Loss

==== Matches ====
19 August 2019 1	Fenerbahçe	5–0	Gaziantep	Istanbul
20:00 TRT (UTC+3)	Moses 6' (pen.); Muriqi 17', (yellow card) 90'; Belözoğlu 24' (pen.); Dirar 74'; Kadıoğlu 88'	Report	Chibsah (yellow card) 12'; Tetteh (yellow card) 50'; Jefferson (yellow card) 80'; Diarra (yellow card) 90'	Stadium: Şükrü Saracoğlu Stadium; Attendance: 36,056; Referee: Arda Kardeşler; Assistant referees: Kemal Yılmaz, Hakan Yemişken; Fourth official: Serkan Tokat

24 August 2019 2	İstanbul Başakşehir	1–2	Fenerbahçe	Istanbul
21:45 TRT (UTC+3)	Crivelli 32'	Report	Muriqi 77'; Dirar 90'	Stadium: Başakşehir Fatih Terim Stadium; Attendance: 6,247; Referee: Halil Umut Meler; Assistant referees: Mustafa Emre Eyisoy, Cevdet Kömürcüoğlu; Fourth official: Suat Arslanboğa

1 September 2019 3	Fenerbahçe	1–1	Trabzonspor	Istanbul
21:45 TRT (UTC+3)	Rodrigues 17'; Dirar (yellow card) 40'	Report	Sosa (yellow card) 8'; Ekuban 27'; Nwakaeme (yellow card) 75'; Çakır (yellow card) 80'	Stadium: Şükrü Saracoğlu Stadium; Attendance: 43,597; Referee: Fırat Aydınus; Assistant referees: Aleks Taşçıoğlu, Erdem Bayık; Fourth official: Ali Şansalan

16 September 2019 4	Alanyaspor	3–1	Fenerbahçe	Alanya, Antalya
20:00 TRT (UTC+3)	Gülselam (yellow card) 22'; Cissé 45', 46'; Fernándes 62'	Report	Ciğerci 39'; Dirar (yellow card) 65'	Stadium: Bahçeşehir Okulları Stadium; Attendance: 8,681; Referee: Halis Özkahya; Assistant referees: Volkan Ahmet Narinç, Asım Yusuf Öz; Fourth official: Cihan Aydın

21 September 2019 5	Fenerbahçe	2–1	Ankaragücü	Istanbul
20:00 TRT (UTC+3)	Jørgensen 20', (yellow card) 80'; Luiz Gustavo (yellow card) 62'; Muriqi 73'	Report	Orgill 16', (yellow card) 24'; Karayel (yellow card) 25'; Canteros (yellow card) 44'	Stadium: Şükrü Saracoğlu Stadium; Attendance: 37,475; Referee: Abdulkadir Bitigen; Assistant referees: İbrahim Çağlar Uyarcan, Ali Saygın Ögel; Fourth official: Burak Şeker

28 September 2019 6	Galatasaray	0–0	Fenerbahçe	Istanbul
20:00 TRT (UTC+3)	Marcão (yellow card) 78'; Mariano (yellow card) 82'	Report	Belözoğlu (yellow card) 75'	Stadium: Türk Telekom Stadium; Attendance: 51,663; Referee: Cüneyt Çakır; Assistant referees: Bahattin Duran, Tarık Ongun; Fourth official: Zorbay Küçük

4 October 2019 7	Fenerbahçe	0–1	Antalyaspor	Istanbul
20:30 TRT (UTC+3)	Jørgensen (yellow card) 51'; Belözoğlu (yellow card) 66'	Report	Akyol 6'; Boffin (yellow card) 81'; Özmert (yellow card) 89'	Stadium: Şükrü Saracoğlu Stadium; Attendance: 37,077; Referee: Yaşar Kemal Uğurlu; Assistant referees: Kerem Ersoy, Serkan Ok; Fourth official: Yiğit Arslan

20 October 2019 8	Denizlispor	1–2	Fenerbahçe	Denizli
19:00 TRT (UTC+3)	Sackey (yellow card) 8'; Aissati (yellow card) 45'; Estupiñán 73'	Report	Ciğerci 39'; Muriqi 62'	Stadium: Denizli Atatürk Stadium; Attendance: 13,352; Referee: Fırat Aydınus; Assistant referees: Aleks Taşçıoğlu, Erdem Bayık; Fourth official: Onur Öztoprak

26 October 2019 9	Fenerbahçe	5–1	Konyaspor	Istanbul
20:00 TRT (UTC+3)	Rodrigues 11'; Jørgensen 14'; Tufan 28'; Luiz Gustavo 78', (yellow card) 86'; Muriqi 82'	Report	Aziz 16' (o.g.); Miya (yellow card) 30'	Stadium: Şükrü Saracoğlu Stadium; Attendance: 39,581; Referee: Ali Şansalan; Assistant referees: Kemal Yılmaz, İsmail Şencan; Fourth official: Alper Çetin

3 November 2019 10	Kayserispor	1–0	Fenerbahçe	Kayseri
19:00 TRT (UTC+3)	Bulut 58'; Subaşı (yellow card) 86'	Report	Rodrigues (yellow card) 61'; Ciğerci (yellow card) 75'; Aziz (yellow card) 82'	Stadium: Kadir Has Stadium; Attendance: 18,147; Referee: Arda Kardeşler; Assistant referees: Erdinç Sezertam, Süleyman Özay; Fourth official: Turgut Doman

8 November 2019 11	Fenerbahçe	3–2	Kasımpaşa	Istanbul
20:30 TRT (UTC+3)	Moses (yellow card) 3'; Muriqi 6' (pen.), 44' (pen.), (yellow card) 69'; Aziz (yellow card) 43', (goal) 59'; Isla (red card) 72'	Report	Khalili 37'; Sadiku (yellow card) 44'; Hafez (yellow card) 45' (yellow-red card) 45'; Kara (yellow card) 45'; Ben Youssef 56'; Fernandes (yellow card) 80'	Stadium: Şükrü Saracoğlu Stadium; Attendance: 37,745; Referee: Ali Palabıyık; Assistant referees: Serkan Olguncan, Serkan Çimen; Fourth official: Kutluhan Bilgiç

24 November 2019 12	Yeni Malatyaspor	0–0	Fenerbahçe	Malatya
19:00 TRT (UTC+3)	Chebake (yellow card) 43'; Mina (yellow card) 45'; Akbaş (yellow card) 90'	Report	Kaldırım (yellow card) 43'; Potuk (yellow card) 45'; Dirar (yellow card) 66'; Rodrigues (yellow card) 90'	Stadium: Yeni Malatya Stadium; Attendance: 16,663; Referee: Mete Kalkavan; Assistant referees: Ceyhun Sesigüzel, Erdem Bayık; Fourth official: Yiğit Arslan

30 November 2019 13	Göztepe	2–2	Fenerbahçe	İzmir
20:00 TRT (UTC+3)	Castro 7'; Öztürk 63' (pen.); Gassama (yellow card) 73'	Report	Aziz 44', (yellow card) 76'; Belözoğlu (yellow card) 50'; Luiz Gustavo (yellow card) 57' (yellow-red card) 90'; Dirar (yellow card) 61'; Bayındır (yellow card) 61'; Türüç (yellow card) 63'; Rodrigues 68'; Jailson (yellow card) 89'	Stadium: Bornova Stadium; Attendance: 8,791; Referee: Abdulkadir Bitigen; Assistant referees: Serkan Ok, Mehmet Cem Hanoğlu; Fourth official: Mustafa İlker Coşkun

6 December 2019 14	Fenerbahçe	5–2	Gençlerbirliği	Istanbul
20:30 TRT (UTC+3)	Muriqi 23', 39', (yellow card) 73'; Tufan (yellow card) 30'; Luiz Gustavo 32'; Kadıoğlu 74'; Kaldırım (yellow card) 79'; Kruse 87'	Report	Sio 8', (yellow card) 20'; Polomat (yellow card) 52'; Stancu 78', (yellow card) 90'; Candeias (yellow card) 81'	Stadium: Şükrü Saracoğlu Stadium; Attendance: 35,078; Referee: Ali Şansalan; Assistant referees: Kerem Ersoy, İsmail Şencan; Fourth official: Direnç Tonusluoğlu

15 December 2019 15	Sivasspor	3–1	Fenerbahçe	Sivas
16:30 TRT (UTC+3)	Fernando 32'; Aksoy (yellow card) 42'; Kılınç (yellow card) 55', (goal) 59'; Çiftçi (yellow card) 61'; Yandaş (yellow card) 90'; Erdal 90'	Report	Isla (yellow card) 5'; Türüç 85'; Rodrigues (red card) 90'; Tufan (yellow card) 90' (yellow-red card) 90'	Stadium: New 4 Eylül Stadium; Attendance: 21,214; Referee: Ali Palabıyık; Assistant referees: Serkan Olguncan, Serkan Çimen; Fourth official: Kutluhan Bilgiç

22 December 2019 16	Fenerbahçe	3–1	Beşiktaş	Istanbul
19:00 TRT (UTC+3)	Kruse 23' (pen.); Tufan 32'; Türüç (yellow card) 37'; Muriqi 58'; Aziz (yellow card) 79'	Report	Lens (yellow card) 31'; Erkin (yellow card) 33'; Hutchinson 45'; Elneny (yellow card) 77'	Stadium: Şükrü Saracoğlu Stadium; Attendance: 44,591; Referee: Cüneyt Çakır; Assistant referees: Bahattin Duran, Tarık Ongun; Fourth official: Alper Ulusoy

29 December 2019 17	Çaykur Rizespor	1–2	Fenerbahçe	Rize
19:00 TRT (UTC+3)	Abarhoun 18'; Çağlayan (yellow card) 24'; Vetrih (yellow card) 56'; Talbi (yellow card) 58'	Report	Türüç 13'; Luiz Gustavo (yellow card) 24'; Tufan (yellow card) 50'; Jailson 70'	Stadium: Çaykur Didi Stadium; Attendance: 10,553; Referee: Halil Umut Meler; Assistant referees: Mustafa Emre Eyisoy, İlker Takpak; Fourth official: Kadir Sağlam

18 January 2020 18	Gaziantep	0–2	Fenerbahçe	Gaziantep
20:00 TRT (UTC+3)	Jefferson (yellow card) 8'; Ceylan (yellow card) 12'; Diarra (yellow card) 39'; Chibsah (yellow card) 63'; Morais (yellow card) 70'	Report	Ciğerci (yellow card) 18'; Bayındır (yellow card) 27'; Kruse 51'; Aziz (yellow card) 57'; Muriqi (yellow card) 80' (yellow-red card) 90', (goal) 90'	Stadium: Gaziantep Stadium; Attendance: 15,024; Referee: Hüseyin Göçek; Assistant referees: Esat Sancaktar, Serkan Ok; Fourth official: Kutluhan Bilgiç

25 January 2020 19	Fenerbahçe	2–0	İstanbul Başakşehir	Istanbul
20:00 TRT (UTC+3)	Kruse 72'; Muriqi 86'	Report	Kahveci (yellow card) 65'	Stadium: Şükrü Saracoğlu Stadium; Attendance: 41,500; Referee: Fırat Aydınus; Assistant referees: Aleks Taşçıoğlu, Erdem Bayık; Fourth official: Mustafa Öğretmenoğlu

1 February 2020 20	Trabzonspor	2–1	Fenerbahçe	Trabzon
20:00 TRT (UTC+3)	Ndiaye (yellow card) 7'; Sørloth 15', (yellow card) 48'; Novák 32'; Sosa (yellow card) 86'	Report	Kruse 1'; Isla (yellow card) 66'; Luiz Gustavo (yellow card) 72' (yellow-red card) 90'; Kadıoğlu (yellow card) 84'; Belözoğlu (yellow card) 90'	Stadium: Medical Park Stadium; Attendance: 38,043; Referee: Ali Palabıyık; Assistant referees: Serkan Olguncan, Serkan Çimen; Fourth official: Serkan Tokat

8 February 2020 21	Fenerbahçe	1–1	Alanyaspor	Istanbul
20:00 TRT (UTC+3)	Bayındır (yellow card) 27'; Kruse 53' (pen.); Jailson (yellow card) 90'; Aziz (yellow card) 90'	Report	Welinton (yellow card) 22'; Cissé 29' (pen.); Uçan (yellow card) 32'; Marafona (yellow card) 35'; Siopis (yellow card) 51'	Stadium: Şükrü Saracoğlu Stadium; Attendance: 35,074; Referee: Ümit Öztürk; Assistant referees: İbrahim Çağlar Uyarcan, İbrahim Bozbey; Fourth official: Onur Özütoprak

15 February 2020 22	Ankaragücü	2–1	Fenerbahçe	Ankara
20:00 TRT (UTC+3)	Lobzhanidze 13'; Rodrigues 75'; Parlak (yellow card) 89'	Report	Isla (yellow card) 41'; Luiz Gustavo (yellow card) 84'; Aziz 90'	Stadium: Eryaman Stadium; Attendance: 18,012; Referee: Mete Kalkavan; Assistant referees: Ceyhun Sesigüzel, Serkan Ok; Fourth official: Caner Ak

23 February 2020 23	Fenerbahçe	1–3	Galatasaray	Istanbul
19:00 TRT (UTC+3)	Aziz (yellow card) 16'; Kruse 21' (pen.); Tufan (yellow card) 36'; Arslan (yellow card) 50'; Dirar (yellow card) 54'; Isla (yellow card) 58'; Türüç (red card) 84'	Report	Belhanda (yellow card) 20' (yellow-red card) 84'; Falcao (yellow card) 36', (goal) 80' (pen.); Donk 40', (yellow card) 68'; Seri (yellow card) 58'; Mariano (yellow card) 74'; Onyekuru 90+7', (yellow card) 90+7'	Stadium: Şükrü Saracoğlu Stadium; Attendance: 45,096; Referee: Halil Umut Meler; Assistant referees: Mustafa Emre Eyisoy, Kerem Ersoy; Fourth official: Koray Gençerler

29 February 2020 24	Antalyaspor	2–2	Fenerbahçe	Antalya
20:00 TRT (UTC+3)	Amilton 52'; Özmert 57', (yellow card) 90' (yellow-red card) 90'; Podolski (yellow card) 63'; Jahović (yellow card) 90'; Fredy (yellow card) 90'; Čelůstka (yellow card)	Report	Muriqi 35'; Luiz Gustavo (yellow card) 50'; Zajc 90'	Stadium: Antalya Stadium; Attendance: 21,684; Referee: Ali Şansalan; Assistant referees: Süleyman Özay, Candaş Elbil; Fourth official: Yiğit Arslan

7 March 2020 25	Fenerbahçe	2–2	Denizlispor	Istanbul
20:00 TRT (UTC+3)	Tufan 22', (yellow card) 76'; Arslan (yellow card) 36' (yellow-red card) 43'; Kaldırım (yellow card) 54'; Aziz (yellow card) 77', (goal) 90'; Ciğerci (yellow card) 86'; Bayındır (yellow card) 90'	Report	Murawski 45' (pen.), (yellow card) 86'; Estupiñán (yellow card) 53'; Yumlu 75'; Çek (yellow card) 87'; Niyaz (yellow card) 90'	Stadium: Şükrü Saracoğlu Stadium; Attendance: 24,718; Referee: Zorbay Küçük; Assistant referees: Mehmet Cem Satman, İlker Takpak; Fourth official: Direnç Tonusluoğlu

14 March 2020 26	Konyaspor	1–0	Fenerbahçe	Konya
20:00 TRT (UTC+3)	Ay (yellow card) 10'; Demirok (yellow card) 31'; Bajić 41'; Skubic (yellow card) 46' (yellow-red card) 67'; Şahiner (yellow card) 55' (yellow-red card) 77'; Taşkıran (yellow card) 88'	Report	Kaldırım (yellow card) 39'; Rodrigues (yellow card) 84'	Stadium: Konya Büyükşehir Stadium; Attendance: 0 (Note: It was concluded that matches would be played behind closed doors in the stadiums in Süper Lig from Week 26 due to the coronavirus pandemic.); Referee: Hüseyin Göçek; Assistant referees: Serkan Ok, Esat Sancaktar; Fourth official: Mert Güzenge

12 June 2020 27	Fenerbahçe	2–1	Kayserispor	Istanbul
21:00 TRT (UTC+3)	Tufan (red card) 14'; Belözoğlu (yellow card) 15'; Muriqi 87' (pen.); Luiz Gustavo 88'	Report	Mensah 59', (yellow card) 82'; Săpunaru (yellow card) 78'	Stadium: Şükrü Saracoğlu Stadium; Attendance: 0 Referee: Atilla Karaoğlan; Assistant referees: Volkan Ahmet Narinç, İbrahim Bozbey; Fourth official: Cihan Aydın

21 June 2020 28	Kasımpaşa	2–0	Fenerbahçe	Istanbul
18:30 TRT (UTC+3)	Meriah (yellow card) 13'; Tirpan (yellow card) 24'; Thiam 55'; Pavelka (yellow card) 73'; Gohou (yellow card) 84'; Erdoğan 90'	Report		Stadium: Recep Tayyip Erdoğan Stadium; Attendance: 0 Referee: Fırat Aydınus; Assistant referees: Aleks Taşcıoğlu, Erdem Bayık; Fourth official: Onur Özütoprak

27 June 2020 29	Fenerbahçe	3–2	Yeni Malatyaspor	Istanbul
18:30 TRT (UTC+3)	Türüç (yellow card) 19'; Muriqi 70'; Rodrigues (yellow card) 77'; Kaldırım (yellow card) 80'; Tufan 90+1', 90+6'	Report	Töre (yellow card) 7' (yellow-red card) 65'; Akbaş (yellow card) 64'; Farnolle (yellow card) 71'; Ndayishimiye 81'; Donald 89'	Stadium: Şükrü Saracoğlu Stadium; Attendance: 0 Referee: Ali Şansalan; Assistant referees: Kerem Ersoy, Mehmet Cem Satman; Fourth official: Burak Şeker

4 July 2020 30	Fenerbahçe	2–1	Göztepe	Istanbul
21:00 TRT (UTC+3)	Kadıoğlu 25', 45+2'; Aziz (yellow card) 54' (yellow-red card) 90+3'	Report	Paluli (yellow card) 49'; Aydoğdu 66'; Öztürk (yellow card) 77'	Stadium: Şükrü Saracoğlu Stadium; Attendance: 0 Referee: Bahattin Şimşek; Assistant referees: İsmail Şencan, Mehmet Kısal; Fourth official: Sarper Barış Saka

7 July 2020 31	Gençlerbirliği	1–1	Fenerbahçe	Ankara
18:30 TRT (UTC+3)	Pehlivan (yellow card) 54'; Stancu 60'; Candeias (yellow card) 90'; Yılmaz (yellow card) 90'	Report	Jailson (yellow card) 16'; Tufan (yellow card) 42'; Kaldırım (yellow card) 59'; Dirar (yellow card) 74'; Belözoğlu 81'	Stadium: Eryaman Stadium; Attendance: 0 Referee: Alper Ulusoy; Assistant referees: Mustafa Emre Eyisoy, İbrahim Bozbey; Fourth official: Murat Erdoğan

11 July 2020 32	Fenerbahçe	1–2	Sivasspor	Istanbul
21:00 TRT (UTC+3)	Tufan (yellow card) 7'; Kaldırım (yellow card) 13'; Türüç 27'; Kadıoğlu (yellow card) 69'	Report	Koné 9' (pen.); Kılınç (yellow card) 17', (goal) 44'; Aksoy (yellow card) 76'; Samassa (yellow card) 90'	Stadium: Şükrü Saracoğlu Stadium; Attendance: 0 Referee: Ali Palabıyık; Assistant referees: Serkan Olguncan, Asım Yusuf Öz; Fourth official: Erkan Özdamar

19 July 2020 33	Beşiktaş	2–0	Fenerbahçe	Istanbul
21:00 TRT (UTC+3)	Lens (yellow card) 27'; Gönül (yellow card) 31', (goal) 70'; Vida 63'; Erkin (yellow card) 90'	Report	Muriqi (red card) 25'; Aziz (yellow card) 25'; Falette (yellow card) 81'; Türüç (yellow card) 86'; Ciğerci (yellow card) 88'; Jailson (yellow card) 90'	Stadium: Vodafone Park; Attendance: 0 Referee: Halil Umut Meler; Assistant referees: Cevdet Kömürcüoğlu, İbrahim Çağlar Uyarcan; Fourth official: Tugay Kaan Numanoğlu

25 July 2020 34	Fenerbahçe	3–1	Çaykur Rizespor	Istanbul
21:00 TRT (UTC+3)	Aziz (yellow card) 17'; Belözoğlu 39' (pen.); Rodrigues 60'; Tufan 90+9'	Report	Škoda 53'	Stadium: Şükrü Saracoğlu Stadium; Attendance: 0 Referee: Halis Özkahya; Assistant referees: Mustafa Emre Eyisoy, Ekrem Kan; Fourth official: Direnç Tonusluoğlu

=== Turkish Cup ===
==== Fourth round ====
30 October 2019	Tarsus İdman Yurdu	1–3	Fenerbahçe	Mersin
20:30 TRT (UTC+3)	Yasak 53'; Develi (yellow card) 55'; Gültekin (yellow card) 87'	Report	Çiftpınar 16'; Türüç 29'; Arslan 70'; Sağlam (yellow card) 79'	Stadium: Mersin Stadium; Referee: Atilla Karaoğlan; Assistant referees: Uygar Bebek, Sezgin Çınar; Fourth official: Serkan Önsal

==== Fifth round ====
3 December 2019 First leg	Fenerbahçe	4–0	İstanbulspor	Istanbul
20:45 TRT (UTC+3)	Türüç 15'; Kadıoğlu 16'; Muriqi 71'; Zajc 88'	Report		Stadium: Şükrü Saracoğlu Stadium; Referee: Zorbay Küçük; Assistant referees: Mehmet Kısal, Mehmet Salih Mazlum; Fourth official: Çağdaş Altay

18 December 2019 Second leg	İstanbulspor	0–2 (0–6 agg.)	Fenerbahçe	Istanbul
20:45 TRT (UTC+3)	Wellington (yellow card) 51'; Selak (yellow card) 54'	Report	Sağlam (yellow card) 37'; Potuk (yellow card) 49'; Jørgensen 54', (yellow card) 89'; Arslan 83'	Stadium: Necmi Kadıoğlu Stadium; Referee: Emre Malok; Assistant referees: Ali Tuna, Mehmet Emin Tuğral; Fourth official: Abdullah Buğra Taşkınsoy

==== Round of 16 ====
14 January 2020 First leg	Kayserispor	0–0	Fenerbahçe	Kayseri
20:30 TRT (UTC+3)	Acar (yellow card) 81'	Report	Arslan (yellow card) 26'; Türüç (yellow card) 90'	Stadium: Kadir Has Stadium; Referee: Bahattin Şimşek; Assistant referees: Mehmet Cem Satman, Hakan Yemişken; Fourth official: Emre Kargın

21 January 2020 Second leg	Fenerbahçe	2–0 (2–0 agg.)	Kayserispor	Istanbul
20:30 TRT (UTC+3)	Kadıoğlu 23'; Erdinç 45'; Arslan (yellow card) 64'; Dirar (yellow card) 78'	Report	Djédjé (yellow card) 50'	Stadium: Şükrü Saracoğlu Stadium; Referee: Ümit Öztürk; Assistant referees: İbrahim Bozbey, Kamil Çetin; Fourth official: Yiğit Arslan

==== Quarter-finals ====
5 February 2020 First leg	Kırklarelispor	0–3	Fenerbahçe	Kırklareli
14:30 TRT (UTC+3)	Doğru (yellow card) 12'; Sürgülü (yellow card) 90'	Report	Erdinç 43', 52'; Kadıoğlu (yellow card) 48'; Sürgülü 57' (o.g.); Rami (yellow card) 59'; Sağlam (yellow card) 75'	Stadium: Kırklareli Atatürk Stadium; Referee: Atilla Karaoğlan; Assistant referees: Kerem Ersoy, Mustafa Savranlar; Fourth official: Turgut Doman

11 February 2020 Second leg	Fenerbahçe	1–0 (4–0 agg.)	Kırklarelispor	Istanbul
20:30 TRT (UTC+3)	Erdinç 50'	Report	Doğru (yellow card) 13'; Çiloğlu (yellow card) 33'; Şişman (yellow card) 49'; Pekesen (yellow card) 76'; Sürgülü (yellow card) 87'	Stadium: Şükrü Saracoğlu Stadium; Referee: Suat Arslanboğa; Assistant referees: İsmail Şencan, Osman Gökhan Bilir; Fourth official: İlker Yasin Avcı

==== Semi-finals ====
3 March 2020 First leg	Trabzonspor	2–1	Fenerbahçe	Trabzon
20:30 TRT (UTC+3)	Sørloth 46'; Sosa (yellow card) 63'; Novák 66'; Çörekçi (yellow card) 90'	Report	Ciğerci (yellow card) 48'; Arslan (yellow card) 61'; Muriqi 82'; Luiz Gustavo (yellow card) 85'	Stadium: Medical Park Stadium; Referee: Yaşar Kemal Uğurlu; Assistant referees: Erdinç Sezertam, Serkan Çimen; Fourth official: Atilla Karaoğlan

16 June 2020 Second leg	Fenerbahçe	1–3 (2–5 agg.)	Trabzonspor	Istanbul
20:45 TRT (UTC+3)	Belözoğlu (red card) 24'; Türüç 42'; Ekici (yellow card) 59'; Ciğerci (yellow card) 74'; Rodrigues (yellow card) 86'	Report	Sørloth 6', 83', (yellow card) 25'; Pereira (yellow card) 84'; Novák 90+2'	Stadium: Şükrü Saracoğlu Stadium; Referee: Cüneyt Çakır; Assistant referees: Bahattin Duran, Tarık Ongun; Fourth official: Mustafa Öğretmenoğlu

== Statistics ==
=== Squad statistics ===
As of 25 July 2020

No.	PMF.	Nat.	Player	Süper Lig						Turkish Cup						Total						Friendly					
No.	PMF.	Nat.	Player	Ap	G	A	Booked	(yellow card) (red card)	Sent off (straight red)	Ap	G	A	Booked	(yellow card) (red card)	Sent off (straight red)	Ap	G	A	Booked	(yellow card) (red card)	Sent off (straight red)	Ap	G	A	Booked	(yellow card) (red card)	Sent off (straight red)
2	DF	(Guinea)	Simon Falette	8	-	1	1	-	-	4	-	-	-	-	-	12	-	1	1	-	-	-	-	-	-	-	-
3	DF	(Turkey)	Hasan Ali Kaldırım (Vice-captain)	18	-	3	7	-	-	2	-	1	-	-	-	20	-	4	7	-	-	4	-	-	-	-	-
5	MF	(Turkey)	Emre Belözoğlu (Captain)	26	3	5	5	-	-	-	-	-	-	1	-	26	3	5	5	1	-	5	1	-	-	-	-
6	MF	(Germany)	Tolgay Arslan	13	-	1	1	1	-	8	2	-	3	-	-	21	2	1	4	1	-	4	-	-	-	-	-
7	MF	(Turkey)	Ozan Tufan	33	6	5	6	1	1	1	-	-	-	-	-	34	6	5	6	1	1	8	2	-	-	-	-
8	MF	(Turkey)	Mehmet Ekici	8	-	1	-	-	-	5	-	2	-	-	-	13	-	3	-	-	-	8	-	-	-	-	-
9	FW	(Turkey)	Mevlüt Erdinç	12	-	-	-	-	-	7	4	-	-	-	-	19	4	-	-	-	-	1	1	-	-	-	-
14	MF	(Turkey)	Tolga Ciğerci	26	2	3	4	-	-	7	-	1	2	-	-	33	2	4	6	-	-	5	1	-	-	-	-
15	DF	(Turkey)	Serdar Aziz	22	4	-	9	1	-	1	-	-	-	-	-	23	4	-	9	1	-	5	-	-	1	-	-
16	MF	(Netherlands)	Ferdi Kadıoğlu	23	4	3	2	-	-	8	2	1	1	-	-	31	6	4	3	-	-	6	-	-	1	-	-
17	MF	(Morocco)	Nabil Dirar	28	2	-	6	-	-	5	-	-	1	-	-	33	2	-	7	-	-	4	1	-	-	-	-
18	DF	(Turkey)	Sadık Çiftpınar	4	-	-	-	-	-	2	1	-	-	-	-	6	1	-	-	-	-	8	-	-	1	-	-
19	FW	(Iran)	Allahyar Sayyadmanesh	2	-	-	-	-	-	1	-	-	-	-	-	3	-	-	-	-	-	6	1	-	1	-	-
20	MF	(Brazil)	Luiz Gustavo	28	3	1	5	2	-	4	-	-	1	-	-	32	3	1	6	2	-	1	-	-	-	-	-
21	MF	(Slovenia)	Miha Zajc	10	1	-	-	-	-	7	1	1	-	-	-	17	2	1	-	-	-	3	-	-	-	-	-
23	MF	(Turkey)	Deniz Türüç	26	3	-	4	-	1	9	3	3	1	-	-	35	6	3	5	-	1	2	-	-	-	-	-
24	MF	(Cape Verde)	Garry Rodrigues	26	4	3	5	-	1	3	-	1	1	-	-	29	4	4	6	-	1	7	1	1	-	-	-
25	MF	(Brazil)	Jailson	27	1	-	4	-	-	8	-	-	-	-	-	35	1	-	4	-	-	9	-	-	-	-	-
26	MF	(Turkey)	Alper Potuk	5	-	-	1	-	-	3	-	-	1	-	-	8	-	-	2	-	-	8	-	-	-	-	-
28	DF	(Turkey)	Murat Sağlam	1	-	-	-	-	-	4	-	-	3	-	-	5	-	-	3	-	-	9	-	-	2	-	-
30	MF	(Turkey)	Ömer Faruk Beyaz	4	-	-	-	-	-	1	-	-	-	-	-	5	-	-	-	-	-	-	-	-	-	-	-
35	GK	(Turkey)	Harun Tekin	2	-	-	-	-	-	6	-	-	-	-	-	8	-	-	-	-	-	8	-	-	-	-	-
52	MF	(Turkey)	Muhammed Gümüşkaya	1	-	-	-	-	-	3	-	1	-	-	-	4	-	1	-	-	-	-	-	-	-	-	-
54	GK	(Turkey)	Erten Ersu	-	-	-	-	-	-	-	-	-	-	-	-	-	-	-	-	-	-	-	-	-	-	-	-
80	MF	(Turkey)	Emre Nasuh	1	-	-	-	-	-	-	-	-	-	-	-	1	-	-	-	-	-	-	-	-	-	-	-
86	DF	(Turkey)	Emir Miray Köksal	1	-	-	-	-	-	-	-	-	-	-	-	1	-	-	-	-	-	-	-	-	-	-	-
94	FW	(Kosovo)	Vedat Muriqi	32	15	5	3	1	1	4	2	1	-	-	-	36	17	6	3	1	1	7	3	-	-	-	-
98	GK	(Turkey)	Altay Bayındır	32	-	-	4	-	-	3	-	-	-	-	-	35	-	-	4	-	-	4	-	-	-	-	-
4	DF	(Chile)	Mauricio Isla	19	-	3	4	-	1	6	-	-	-	-	-	25	-	3	4	-	1	4	-	-	1	-	-
10	FW	(Germany)	Max Kruse	20	7	6	-	-	-	3	-	1	-	-	-	23	7	7	-	-	-	8	2	-	-	-	-
11	MF	(Nigeria)	Victor Moses	6	1	1	1	-	-	1	-	-	-	-	-	7	1	1	1	-	-	8	1	-	-	-	-
32	DF	(Denmark)	Mathias Jørgensen	16	2	-	2	-	-	3	1	-	1	-	-	19	3	-	3	-	-	-	-	-	-	-	-
34	DF	(France)	Adil Rami	1	-	-	-	-	-	6	-	-	1	-	-	7	-	-	1	-	-	-	-	-	-	-	-
