= Miray (disambiguation) =

Miray may refer to:

== Given name ==
- Miray (Turkish name)

=== People ===
- Emir Miray Köksal (born 2001), a Turkish footballer
- Kağan Miray Bağış (born 1998), a Turkish footballer
- Miray Akay (born 2000), a Ukrainian-Turkish actress
- Miray Balotu (born 2001), a Turkish basketball player
- Miray Bekbölet, a Turkish environmental chemist
- Miray Cin (born 2001), a Turkish-German footballer
- Miray Daner (born 1999), a Turkish actress

== Places ==
- Miray, a district center of Andar District, Ghazni Province, Afghanistan
- Ambohimalaza Miray, a rural municipality in Madagascar

== Other uses ==
- Chevrolet Miray, a Chevrolet concept car, introduced 2011
