= TVSS =

TVSS may refer to:

- Tactile-visual sensory substitution, a device created by Paul Bach
- Total volatile suspended solids, a water quality measure
- Transient voltage surge suppressor
