= Boris Revut =

German-Russian chemist, inventor, and writer

- Russian: Борис Исаакович Ревут
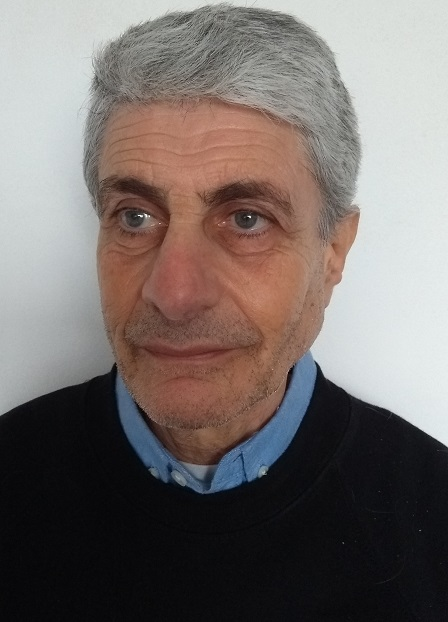
- Born: 19 August 1947 (age 77); Saint Petersburg, Russia

Boris Revut (also Boris Revout; Russian: Борис Исаакович Ревут; born 19 August 1947) is a German-Russian chemist, inventor and writer.

== Early life and education ==
Boris Revut was born in Saint Petersburg, Russia into a family of scientists. He showed interest in natural sciences at a young age, then studied organic chemistry and English language and literature at the Pedagogical University of St. Petersburg between 1965 and 1970. In school, he worked in phosphor-organic chemistry, a new field, connected with organic aminophosphonic acids. He finished university with honours. Revut then pursued his doctoral degree in Saint Petersburg State University's chemistry department in the area of colloid chemistry and nanotechnology. His dissertation was dedicated to a new direction of force microscopy.

== Career ==
Revut developed a method of interaction force determination, which allowed for the measurement of connection between surfaces with different natures. Measurements were calculated using the theory of interaction of nanoparticles. This method could also measure the adhesion of particles to macro-surfaces as the interaction of large biomolecules between them. This work preceded the invention of the first force microscope. Revut worked as an engineer in the paper-pulp industry for more than 20 years. His responsibilities included environment protection, water purification, biotechnology, and fine chemical processing. He developed methods of removing metal ions, petroleum products, poisonous organic substances, hormones, pesticides, and gaseous compounds from water. He also improved the biotechnological processes of yeast production, water purification, and sludge utilization. He has filed more than 50 patents in Russia.

Between 1996 and 2002, Revut worked as a manager at the Institute of Biotechnology Applications in Environment Protection and Medicine in Hamburg. Since 2006, he has worked as a writer and has published more than 22 fiction and poetry books in Russian and German. Many of his novels center on violent political and social themes, including the struggle for freedom and justice.

== Personal life ==
Revut's wife Natalia illustrates his books. The couple have a son and grandson.

== Works ==
- 2007: With rhymes through space and time (ISBN 978-3-89781-124-9)
- 2008: A touch of inspiration (ISBN 978-3-89781-141-6)
- 2009: The unexpected views
- 2009: Face to face with the tyrant (ISBN 978-5-91419-252-2)
- 2010: The sketches of penetrations (ISBN 978-3-83916-709-0)
- 2010: A righteousness lesson (ISBN 978-3-83913-145-9)
- 2010: Forward - to the past (ISBN 978-3-84231-269-2)
- 2011: Under the constellation of Balance (ISBN 978-3-84480-669-4)
- 2011: An occurrence and a fiction (ISBN 978-3-84237-034-0)
- 2012: Hartz 007 (ISBN 978-3-84821-156-2)
- 2012: A biological neural network (ISBN 978-3-84825-276-3)
- 2013: A secret of an oligarch (ISBN 978-3-73228-764-2)
- 2014: A chase after the ghosts (ISBN 978-3-73579-178-8)
- 2015: A criminal libretto
- 2016: An invasion (ISBN 978-3-83706-302-8)
- 2017: Secrets of pharmacy (ISBN 978-3-74317-784-0)
- 2017: A falsifier (ISBN 978-3-74484-872-5)
- 2018: 2060 (ISBN 978-3-75282-409-4)
- 2018: Regain one's sight: A poetry collection (ISBN 978-3-75286-635-3)
- 2019: The live do not pass by (ISBN 978-3-74942-147-3
- 2020: The steep ascent (ISBN 978-3-75289-719-7)
- 2020: The unforeseen circumstances (ISBN 978-3-75264-692-4)
- 2021: The invisible friends and enemies (ISBN 978-3-75432-437-0)
