= Çeçen =

Çeçen is a surname. Notable people with the name include:

- Ferhan Çeçen (born 1961), Turkish environmental engineer and chemist
- Mümtaz Çeçen (1876–1941), Ottoman-Turkish military officer
- Timo Çeçen (born 1994), German footballer

== See also ==
- Ağrı İbrahim Çeçen University
