= Sludge =

Semi-solid slurry

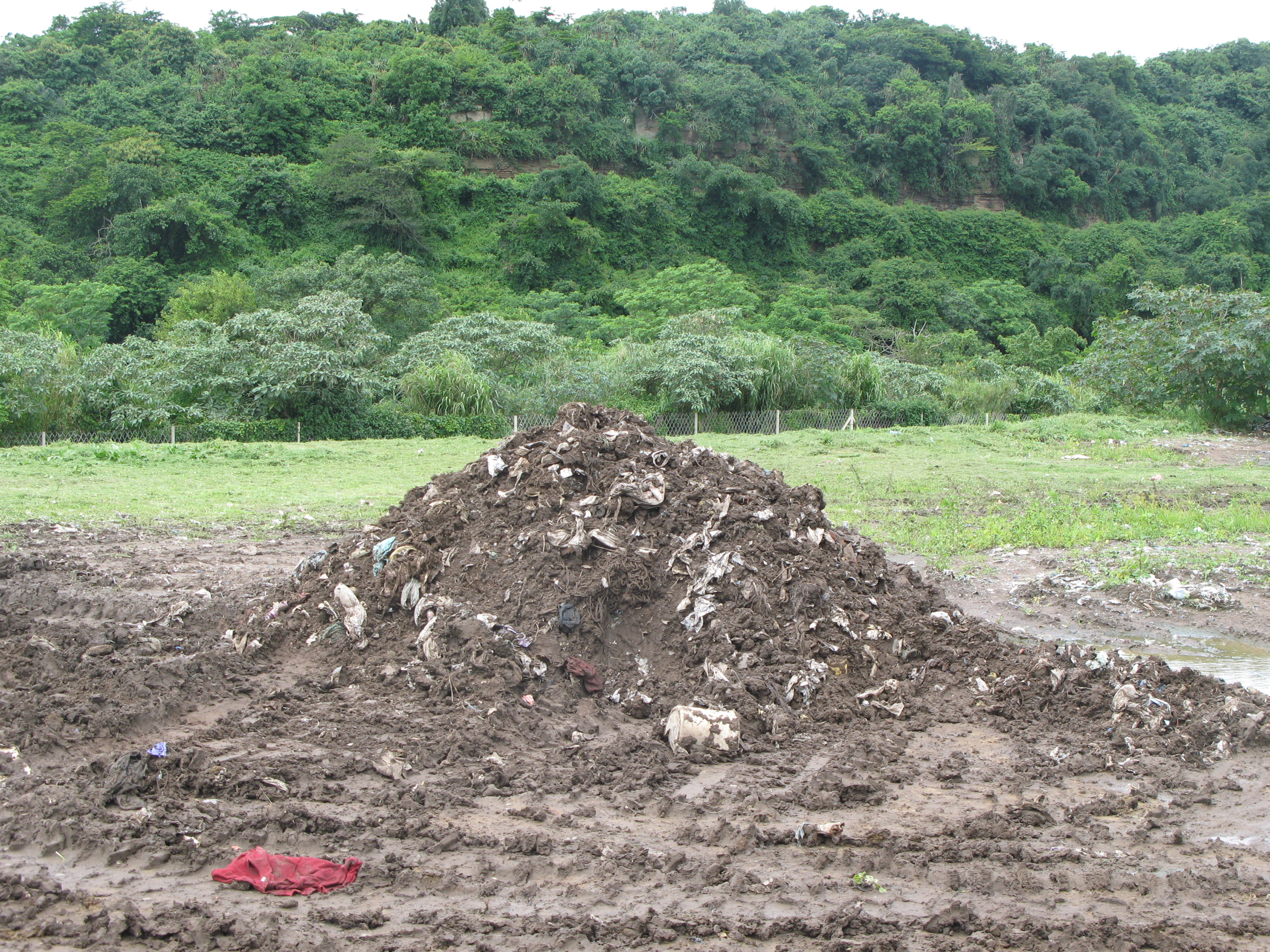
Fecal sludge collected from pit latrines near Durban, South Africa, awaiting further treatment by drying

Sludge (possibly from Middle English slutch 'mud, mire', or some dialect related to slush) is a semi-solid slurry that can be produced from a range of industrial processes, from water treatment, wastewater treatment or on-site sanitation systems. It can be produced as a settled suspension obtained from conventional drinking water treatment, as sewage sludge from wastewater treatment processes or as fecal sludge from pit latrines and septic tanks. The term is also sometimes used as a generic term for solids separated from suspension in a liquid; this soupy material usually contains significant quantities of interstitial water (between the solid particles). Sludge can consist of a variety of particles, such as animal manure.

Industrial wastewater treatment plants produce solids that are also referred to as sludge. This can be generated from biological or physical-chemical processes.

Sludge from the food-processing and beverage-making industries can have a high content of protein and other nutrients. Thus, it can be processed for beneficial uses such as animal feed, rather than being landfilled.

== Types of sludge ==
There are several types of sludge, often categorized by their origin or processing stages:

- Primary sludge: This sludge originates from the primary treatment of wastewater, where solids settle out by gravity. Primary sludge often contains large particulate organic matter and inorganic compounds.
- Secondary sludge: Also known as biological sludge, this sludge comes from secondary wastewater treatment processes that use biological agents to decompose organic pollutants. Secondary sludge consists mostly of microorganisms, dead cells, and remaining organic materials.
- Tertiary or chemical sludge: Produced in some treatment facilities as part of a tertiary process, this sludge contains residual chemicals used to remove phosphorus, nitrogen, and other pollutants.
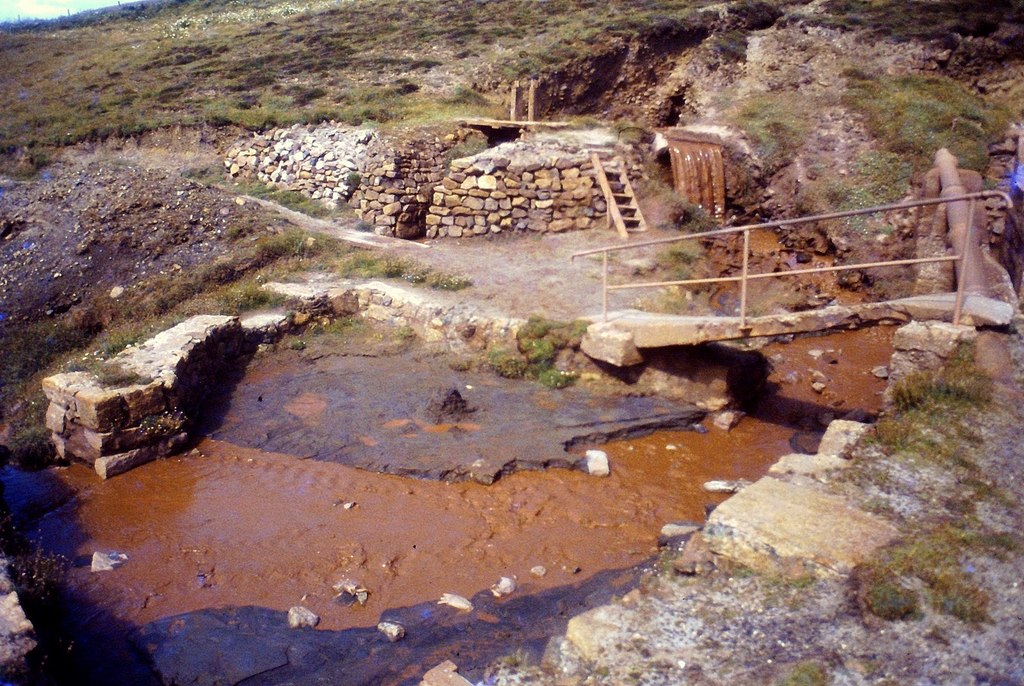
  Mineral sludge exiting the Geevor Tin Mine in Cornwall, United Kingdom
- Mineral sludge: This name is given to sludge produced during mineral processes such as quarries or mining beneficiation processes. Their nature is essentially mineral particles of various sizes (including clays). They have a very good aptitude to settle by gravity and very high concentrations are frequently obtained
- Waste activated sludge (WAS): is generated from the biological treatment of wastewater and primarily comprises microorganisms, including bacteria and other volatile organic compounds. WAS typically has low or no stabilization and contains a high level of volatile suspended solids (VSS), ranging from 80% to 85% of the total solids. Dewaterability of WAS is moderate, achieving dry residue (DR) values between 14% and 17% after dewatering. It is often combined with primary sludge to form mixed sludge, enhancing stabilization and dewaterability.
- Aerated sludge: is stabilized through intensive aeration, typically over a 15-day period, reducing its organic content and microbial activity. This process decreases the volatile dry residue (VDR) to about 68% of dry mass, allowing for improved dewatering with DR values reaching 21% to 25%. This type of sludge is generally free of sticking issues during belt drying and is commonly found in smaller wastewater treatment plants.

== Sludge composition ==
Sludge composition varies significantly based on its source and the treatment process used. It generally includes:

- Organic matter: Made up of decomposed or undecomposed materials, it serves as a potential energy source.
- Nutrients: Nitrogen and phosphorus are often present and, in some cases, can be beneficial if sludge is used as fertilizer.
- Heavy metals: Sludge can contain toxic metals like cadmium, lead, and mercury, especially if it originates from industrial wastewater, which poses potential risks if the sludge is reused. (Fytili & Zabaniotou, 2008).
- Pathogens: bacteria, viruses, and parasites are frequently found in sludge, especially municipal sludge, and require disinfection before disposal or reuse.

== Treatment and disposal methods ==
Proper sludge treatment and disposal are crucial to minimize environmental and public health impacts.

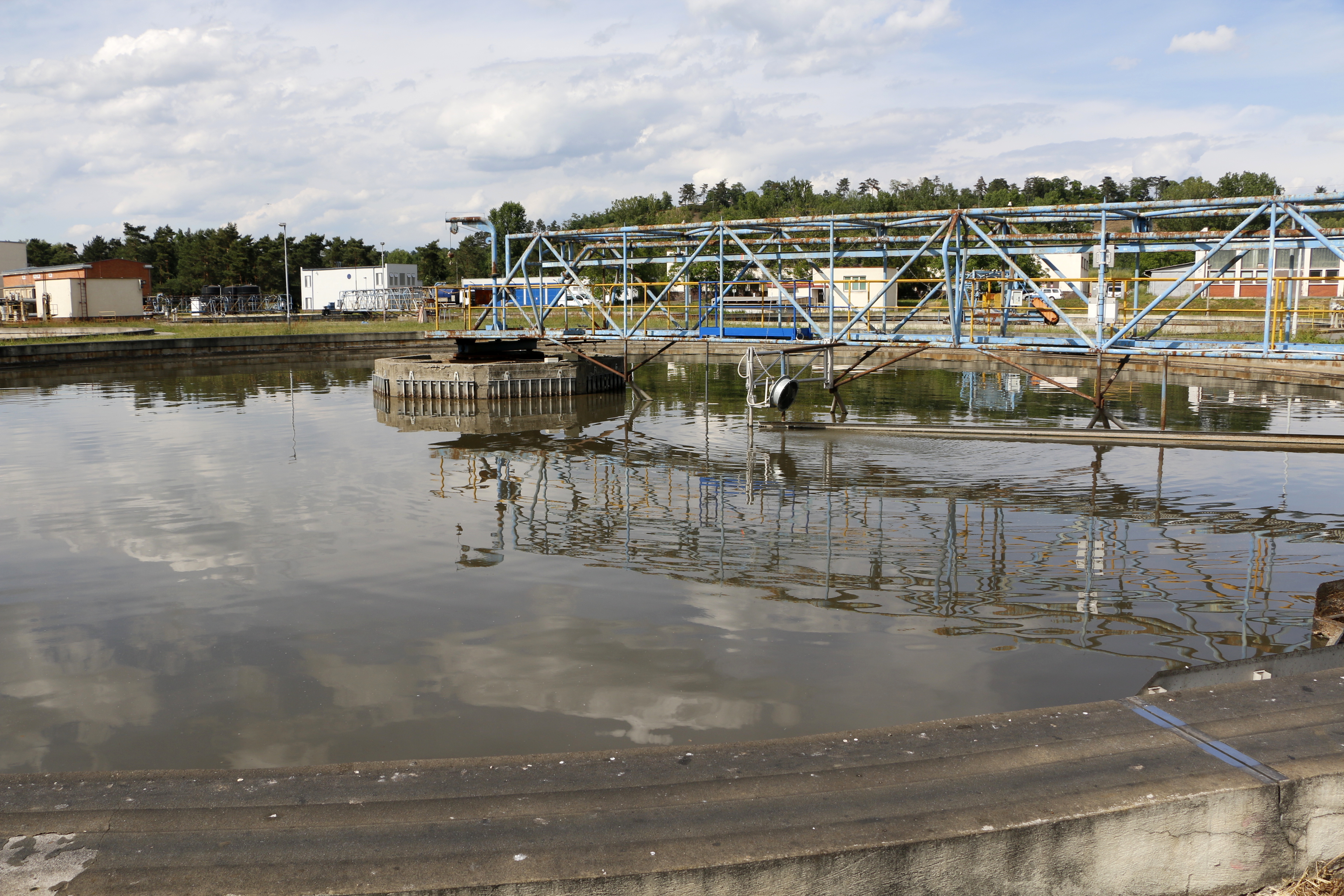
Primary settling tank for sludge collection and treatment in Prague

Common methods include:

1. Thickening and dewatering: Thickening and dewatering reduce sludge volume, making it easier to transport and process further. Dewatering techniques include centrifugation and filtration.
2. Anaerobic digestion: This process decomposes organic matter in sludge in the absence of oxygen, producing biogas that can be used as an energy source. Anaerobic digestion reduces pathogen levels and stabilizes sludge.
3. Composting: Composting sludge with other organic materials can create a soil amendment product. This requires proper management to control pathogens and odors.
4. Incineration: Sludge can be incinerated, converting it into ash and reducing volume significantly. However, this process requires energy input and can emit pollutants if not properly controlled.

== Reuse and environmental concerns ==
Some treated sludge, known as biosolids, can be used as fertilizer in agriculture due to its nutrient content. However, the presence of contaminants like heavy metals and pathogens requires careful regulation and management. In many countries, guidelines limit the application of biosolids to protect soil health and groundwater quality. There is also increasing concern over "forever chemicals" like PFAS (per- and polyfluoroalkyl substances) that can accumulate in sludge and pose long-term environmental risks.

== Regulatory standards and management ==
Many countries have established regulatory frameworks for sludge management. In the United States, for instance, the Environmental Protection Agency (EPA) oversees the safe disposal and reuse of sludge through its "Part 503" regulations. These regulations set limits on pathogens, heavy metals, and other contaminants to ensure biosolids used in agriculture or land application are safe. Similarly, the European Union has strict directives regarding sludge, emphasizing sustainable practices and environmental protection.

=== 40 CFR Part 503 ===
The EPA, under CWA section 405(d), established regulations for the use and disposal of sewage sludge (biosolids) found in 40 CFR Part 503. These standards regulate sludge applied to land, incinerated, or placed in surface disposal sites, addressing pollutant limits, pathogen and vector reduction, management practices, monitoring, recordkeeping, and reporting. They apply to anyone handling, applying, or disposing of sewage sludge, as well as operators of disposal sites. Initially finalized in 1993, 40 CFR Part 503 has been amended several times. The original regulation is in the Federal Register, while the updated version is in the Code of Federal Regulations.

=== Sewage Sludge Directive 86/278/EEC ===
The directive aims to promote the safe use of sewage sludge in agriculture while protecting human health, soil, water, and the environment. It prohibits untreated sludge on agricultural land unless properly incorporated into the soil, mandates adherence to plant nutrient requirements, and prevents soil and water contamination. The Directive also supports the EU's waste hierarchy by encouraging safe recycling of nutrients like phosphorus, aligning with circular economy principles and the European Green Deal's zero pollution goals.

Using treated sludge as an alternative to chemical fertilizers reduces dependence on raw material extraction but requires strict control to avoid spreading contaminants. A 2014 evaluation of the SSD highlighted shortcomings due to its outdated framework, including gaps in addressing modern pollutants (e.g., pharmaceuticals, microplastics) and its alignment with the EU's circular economy goals. It also identified a need to regulate other sludge uses and consider interactions with newer policies, such as the Urban Waste Water Treatment Directive (UWWTD).

Since then, scientific advances, policy changes, and new EU strategies (e.g., Circular Economy Action Plan, Farm to Fork Strategy, Biodiversity Strategy 2030) have underscored the need to update the SSD. A comprehensive evaluation is underway to determine whether revisions are necessary to meet contemporary environmental, health, and resource efficiency needs.
