= Miray Bekbölet =

Turkish environmental chemist

- Education: Ege University (BS, PhD)
- Scientific career
- Fields: Environmental chemistry
- Workplaces: Boğaziçi University

Miray Bekbölet is a Turkish environmental chemist researching oxidation techniques, photocatalytic and photolytic reactions, adsorption/bio-oxidation processes in aquatic systems, and drinking water quality. She is a professor of environmental chemistry at the Boğaziçi University Institute of Environmental Sciences.

== Education ==
Miray Bekbölet completed a B.S. with high distinction in chemistry and physics at Ege University in 1973. In 1979, she earned a Ph.D. in food sciences at Ege University.

== Career and research ==
Bekbölet joined the faculty at Boğaziçi University in 1985 as an instructor in the Institute of Environmental Sciences. She was promoted to assistant professor in 1986, associate professor in 1991 and professor in 1997.

Bekbölet's researches oxidation techniques, photocatalytic and photolytic reactions, adsorption/bio-oxidation processes in aquatic systems, and drinking water quality.
