= Suspended particulate matter =

Suspended particulate matter can refer to:

- Particulates, atmospheric aerosol particles
- Suspended solids, colloidal suspensions in water in general
- Total suspended solids, a water quality measurement of the mass of particles in water by dry weight
