= Ferhan Çeçen =

Turkish environmental engineer and chemist

Ferhan Çeçen (born June 15, 1961) is a Turkish environmental engineer and chemist, researching wastewater treatment, environmental biotechnology, and adsorption processes. She is currently a professor at the Boğaziçi University Institute of Environmental Sciences.

== Early life and education ==
Ferhan Çeçen was born on June 15, 1961, in Istanbul, Turkey. She graduated from the Deutsche Schule Istanbul in 1980 and speaks fluent English and German in addition to her native Turkish. Çeçen completed a B.S. in chemical engineering at Boğaziçi University in 1984.

In 1986, she completed a M.S. in environmental engineering at the Istanbul Technical University (ITU). Her Master's thesis was titled Metal Complexation and its Implications on related Technologies. Her graduate advisor was Derin Orhon.

Çeçen earned a Ph.D. in environmental engineering at ITU in 1990. Her dissertation was titled Nitrogen Removal from High-strength Wastewaters by Upflow Submerged Nitrification and Denitrification Filters. Her doctoral advisor was Ethem Gönenç.

== Career and research ==
In November 1990, Çeçen joined the faculty at the Boğaziçi University Institute of Environmental Sciences as an instructor. She was promoted to assistant professor in March 1993, associate professor in October 1993, and full professor in June 1999.

Çeçen researches water and wastewater treatment, environmental biotechnology, adsorption processes, and the impacts of hazardous substances on biological treatment.

She has over 100 publications including "Activated Carbon", "Review of experimental biodegradation data on pharmaceuticals and comparison with predictive BIOWIN models", and "Inhibitory Effect of Silver and Nanosilver on Activated Sludge Fed with Proteinaceous Feed".

== Awards ==
In November of 2000, Ferhan Cecen won two awards: The 2000 TUBITAK (Turkish Scientific and Technical Research Institution) Encouragement Award in Engineering Sciences, and 2000 Bogazici University, Research Award for Young Scientists.

== Selected works ==
- Çeçen, Ferhan; Aktaş, Özgür (2012). Activated Carbon for Water and Wastewater Treatment: Integration of Adsorption and Biological Treatment. Wiley-VCH. ISBN 978-3-527-63946-5. OCLC 808347940.
