= Adsorption/bio-oxidation process =

Modification of the activated sludge process used for wastewater treatment

The adsorption/bio-oxidation process (AB process) is a variation of the activated sludge process used in wastewater treatment. This two-stage system combines a high-rate adsorption stage (A-stage) with a lower-rate bio-oxidation stage (B-stage). A key characteristic of the AB process is the absence of a primary clarifier, with the A-stage operating as an open, dynamic biological system. Each stage includes separate settling tanks and sludge recycling, allowing for the development of distinct microbial communities within each reactor.

== History ==
Adsorption/bio-oxidation process was invented in the mid-1970s by Botho Böhnke, a professor of the RWTH Aachen University. It was based on the finding made by the German engineer Karl Imhoff in the 1950s. Imhoff stated that the treatment efficiency of 60–80 percent could be achieved in highly loaded activated sludge basins.

In 1977 Böhnke published his first article on adsorption/bio-oxidation process. The same year the patent was issued. Extensive research of the following years, conducted by Böhnke together with Bernd and Andreas Diering, ended up in 1985 with the establishment of the company Dr.-Ing. Bernd Diering GmbH. The same year, the AB-process was for the first time applied in a full-scale at the Krefeld, Germany sewage treatment plant (800 000 P.E.). In 1990, 19 full scale installations existed in Western Germany alone. Further application of the process in Europe was hindered by the tightening of the effluent discharge requirements with respect to nitrogen and phosphorus. The process came into notice in 2000 again due to the increased interest in energy recovery from wastewater.

== Principle of operation ==
The A-stage, or adsorption stage is the most innovative component of the process. It is not preceded by primary treatment.

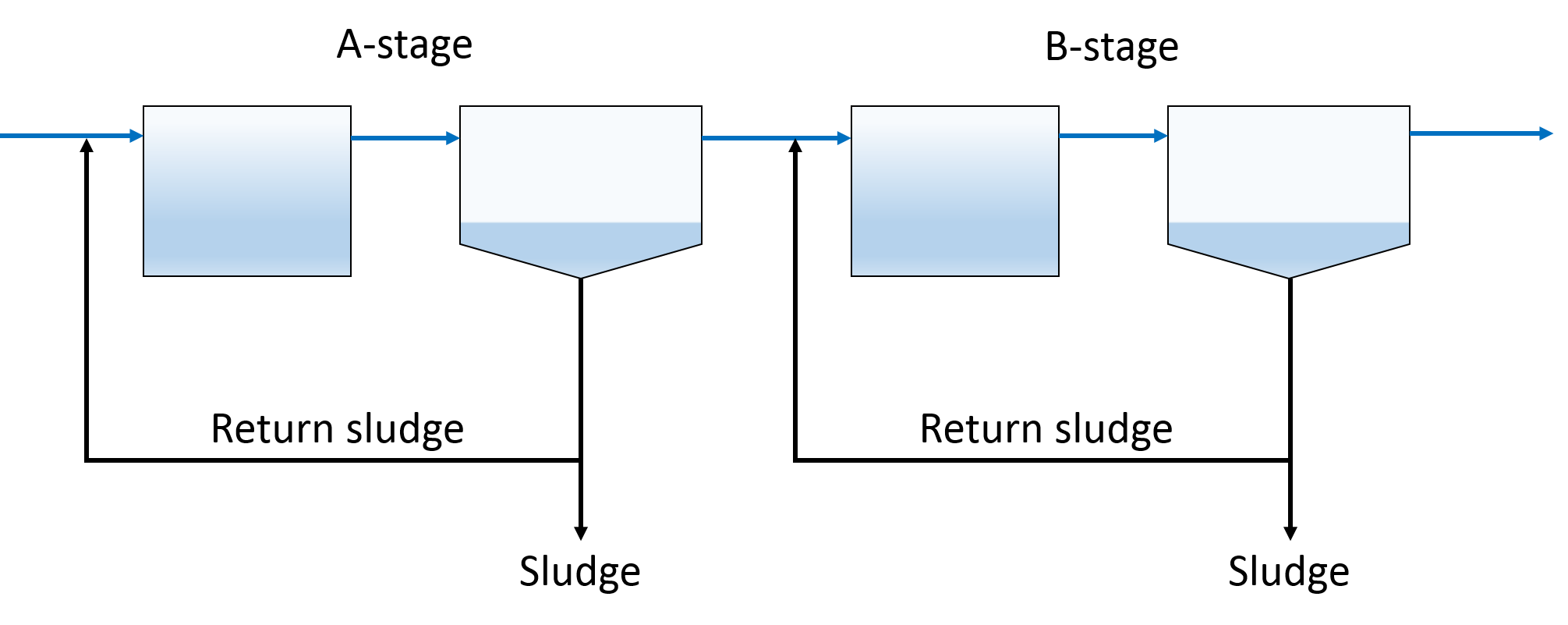
Simple schematic description of the adsorption/bio-oxidation process

Influent organic matter is removed in the A-stage mainly by flocculation and sorption to sludge due to the high loading rates (2–10 g BOD • g VSS^{−1} • d^{−1}) and low sludge age (typically 4–10 h). Hydrolysis of complex organic molecules occurs improving biodegradability of the influent of the B-stage. High loading rates and low sludge age favours development of dynamic biocoenosis with a large fraction of microorganisms present in the exponential growth phase. Diverse sludge biocoenosis increase variety of organic compounds that can be degraded in the A-stage and makes the process more stable towards the shock loads. Altogether, up to 80% of the influent organic matter can be removed in the A-stage. The required reactor volume and oxygen supply are lower if compared to the removal in the conventional activated sludge process.

The B-stage, or bio-oxidation stage, is a typical low-loaded activated sludge process, where biodegradation of the remaining organic material occurs. The B-stage can be designed for nitrogen and/or phosphorus removal by alternating aerobic, anoxic and anaerobic zones in the reactor.

=== Typical operational conditions of the adsorption/bio-oxidation process ===
Parameter	A-stage	B-stage
Loading rate, g BOD • g VSS^{−1} • d^{−1}	2 - 10	0.05 - 0.3
HRT, h	0.5	2 - 4
MLSS, g/L	1.5 - 2	3 - 4
SRT, d	0.2 - 0.5	15 - 20
Dissolved oxygen, mg/L	0.2 - 0.7	0.7 - 1.5

=== Advantages of the process ===
- Lower aeration requirements decrease energy consumption and aeration costs for 20 percent if compared with conventional single stage activated sludge plant.
- The volumes of aeration tanks are 40% lower if compared with conventional single stage activated sludge plant.
- Increased sludge production in the A-stage results in increased biogas production in the digester (for plants with anaerobic digestion of excess sludge).
- Stability towards the shock loads (pH, chemical oxygen demand (COD), toxic substances) explained by the wide-ranging biochemical potential, high mutation capacity and adaptability of sludge in the A-stage.
- A-stage can receive higher organic loads than conventional activated sludge systems.
- Effluent concentrations are more stable because of the two-stage process configuration employed.
- Heavy metals are mainly removed with the A-stage sludge. Therefore, B-stage sludge has lower concentrations of heavy metals than sludge from conventional activated sludge process and may comply with the agricultural standards.

=== Drawbacks of the process ===
- Incomplete denitrification is often observed in the B-stage if the influent C/N ratio is low. Direct by-pass of a part of A-stage influent with high organic matter content to the B-stage is used to increase the C/N ratio.
- High sludge production in the A-stage is a drawback for WWTPs that are not equipped with anaerobic digestion of sludge because it increases sludge treatment costs.
- Sludge from A-stage has poor settling properties.
- High retention times cause an increased need for additional reactors to maintain throughput increasing equipment costs

== Nutrient removal ==
Nitrogen removal in the A-stage can reach 30–40%, as nitrogen of organic compounds is incorporated in upflow anaerobic sludge blanket (UASB) reactor sludge.

The sludge age of the B-stage is typically between 8 and 20 days promoting the growth of nitrifiers. Therefore, complete nitrification is usually achieved in the B-stage. Complete denitrification is difficult to achieve, because of the low C:N ratio in the influent of the B-stage. Insufficient carbon supply of carbon source to the B-stage occurs due to the high efficiency of organic matter removal in the A-stage. The problem can be solved by decreasing organic matter removal in the A-stage, external carbon source supply, intermittent aeration or decreased HRT of the A-stage and/or on-line control of certain operational parameters. To achieve biological nitrogen and phosphorus removal anaerobic and anoxic compartments are introduced before the aerated zone of the B-stage.

Phosphorus removal from the secondary effluent of the B-stage can be achieved by coagulation with ferric and aluminium salts, e.g. FeCl_{3} or Al_{2}(SO_{4})_{3}.

== Applications for municipal wastewater treatment ==
The adsorption/bio-oxidation process was applied at the Krefeld plant (800 000 P.E.) in 1985 for the first time. The plant was expanded and modified and currently treats municipal and industrial wastewater of 1 200 000 P.E.

Currently adsorption/bio-oxidation process is applied at the municipal treatment plants in Germany, the Netherlands (WWTP Dokhaven (Rotterdam), WWTP Utrecht, WWTP Garmerwolde (Groningen) etc.), Austria (WWTP Salzburg, WWTP Strass etc.), Spain, US, China etc.

Adsorption/bio-oxidation process is a part of innovative wastewater treatment concept WaterSchoon, realized in the Netherlands. 250 apartments in the new district Noorderhoek (Sneek, the Netherlands) are equipped with separate collection systems for toilet wastewater and the rest of the household wastewater (or so-called greywater). Both streams are treated separately in order to maximize recovery of resources from wastewater. Adsorption/bio-oxidation process is used for grey water treatment to increase sludge production. Sludge, produced in both stages of the process, is digested together with toilet wastewater in the UASB reactor to maximize energy recovery.

== Applications for industrial wastewater treatment ==
The adsorption/bio-oxidation process is used for treatment of industrial wastewater with high COD, including wastewater from:

- Pulp and paper industry
- Textile industry
- Food industry, including dairy industry
- Pharmaceutical industry
- Leather tanning industry

The C/N and C/P ratios of industrial wastewater is often too high for complete aerobic biodegradation of the influent organic matter, even after the adsorption stage. Addition of nutrients prior to bio-oxidation stage is required in these cases.

== See also ==
- Biosorption
- List of waste-water treatment technologies
