= Beri Pardo =

Portuguese-Turkish football strategist

Personal information
- Full name: Beri Pardo
- Date of birth: 1 April 1990 (age 36)

Managerial career
- Years: Team
- 2021–2022: İstanbul Başakşehir (assistant coach)

Beri Pardo (born 1 April 1990) is a Portuguese-Turkish association football strategist and analyst who was most recently the Head of Performance Strategy for Premier League club Hull City.

He has also previously worked for Crystal Palace, Trabzonspor, Fenerbahçe, and İstanbul Başakşehir.

== Career ==
Pardo spent his early career working as an analyst for Crystal Palace across two separate spells, which preceded and succeeded a period at Trabzonspor in charge of their recruitment strategy team. On 7 June 2018, Damien Comolli became the new sporting director of Süper Lig side Fenerbahçe. Later that summer, Comolli hired Pardo as the club's Head of Performance Analysis.

Emre Belözoğlu signed as the new head coach of İstanbul Başakşehir on 4 October 2021, and chose Pardo to be his assistant in the job. Just over a year later, on 19 October 2022, Hull City announced the appointment of Pardo as their new Head of Performance Strategy. In June 2023, he became Hull's sporting director, before silently departing the club in December 2024 after Jared Dublin had been promoted to replace him two months earlier.

== Personal life ==
Pardo holds both Portuguese and Turkish citizenship, and is a UEFA A licence coach.
