= Murat Sağlam =

German-born Turkish footballer

Personal information
- Full name: Murat Sağlam
- Date of birth: 10 April 1998 (age 28)
- Place of birth: Hamelin, Germany
- Height: 1.75 m (5 ft 9 in)
- Positions: Midfielder; right-back

Youth career
- –2010: Eintracht Hameln
- 2010–2014: Tündern
- 2014–2017: Wolfsburg
- 2014–2015: → Hameln-Land (loan)

Senior career*
Years	Team	Apps	(Gls)
2017–2019	VfL Wolfsburg II	58	(13)
2019–2022	Fenerbahçe	1	(0)
2020–2021	→ Çaykur Rizespor (loan)	1	(0)

International career^{‡}
2015	Turkey U18	2	(0)
2016–2017	Turkey U19	3	(0)
2018–	Turkey U21	5	(0)
- * Club domestic league appearances and goals as of 6 August 2022 ‡ National team caps and goals as of 4 July 2020

Murat Sağlam (born 10 April 1998) is a professional footballer. Born in Germany, he represents Turkey internationally.

== Playing career ==
On 15 June 2019, signed a professional contract with Fenerbahçe. Sağlam made his professional debut with Fenerbahçe in a 2-1 Süper Lig win over Göztepe S.K. on 4 July 2020.
