= Emre Nasuh =

Turkish footballer

Personal information
- Date of birth: 1 January 2001 (age 25)
- Place of birth: Yüreğir, Turkey
- Height: 1.80 m (5 ft 11 in)
- Position: Midfielder

Team information
- Current team: Darıca Gençlerbirliği
- Number: 80

Youth career
- 2012–2013: Adana Gençlerbirliği
- 2013–2020: Fenerbahçe

Senior career*
| Years | Team | Apps | (Gls) |
| 2020–2021 | Fenerbahçe | 1 | (0) |
| 2020–2021 | → Turgutluspor (loan) | 11 | (0) |
| 2021– | Darıca Gençlerbirliği | 10 | (0) |
- * Club domestic league appearances and goals as of 12 November 2022

Emre Nasuh (born 1 January 2001) is a Turkish professional footballer who plays as a midfielder for Darıca Gençlerbirliği.

== Professional career ==
Nasuh made his professional debut with Fenerbahçe in a 3-1 Süper Lig win over Çaykur Rizespor on 25 July 2020.
