= Miray (Turkish name) =

- Gender: Female
- Language: Turkish

Origin
- Meaning: Leader that emanates light like the moon

Other names
- See also: Aydan

Miray is a Turkish female given name. According to the Turkish Language Institute (Türk Dil Kurumu) Miray is a Turkish name created from the Persian root Mir and Turkish root Ay. Mir in Persian means leader and Ay in Turkish means the moon. Hence the Turkish Language Institute interprets the meaning of Miray as a "Leader that emanates light like the moon." According to Nişanyan Turkish names database Miray and Mirayşah are feminine names mostly given in the Western parts of Anatolia in Istanbul, İzmir, Bursa, Adana and in the east in the predominantly Turkish Elazığ. Miray is a feminine given name among Balkan Turks. Sevan Nişanyan points out that the origin of the name Miray is the Western Turkoman city of Aydın and finds a correlation with the use of the name Mirayşe which is the short form of Emir Ayşe. He speculates that Emir Ayşe first evolved to Mirayşe and finally to Miray.Mirayşe to Miray per Nişanyan

== People ==
- Miray Akay (born 2000), Ukrainian-Turkish actress
- Miray Cin (born 2001), Turkish-German footballer
- Miray Daner (born 1999), Turkish actress
