= Emir Miray Köksal =

Turkish footballer

Personal information
- Date of birth: 18 October 2001 (age 25)
- Place of birth: Adapazarı, Turkey
- Height: 1.80 m (5 ft 11 in)
- Position: Left back

Team information
- Current team: Yeni Mersin İY
- Number: 13

Youth career
- 2013–2020: Fenerbahçe

Senior career*
Years	Team	Apps	(Gls)
2020–2021	Fenerbahçe	1	(0)
2020–2021	→ Belediye Kütahyaspor (loan)	23	(1)
2021–2022	Şanlıurfaspor	13	(0)
2022–2023	Iğdır	5	(0)
2023	Darıca Gençlerbirliği	14	(1)
2023–2024	52 Orduspor	10	(0)
2024	Kepezspor	8	(0)
2024–2025	Diyarbekirspor	11	(1)
2025	Kırklarelispor	6	(0)
2025–	Yeni Mersin İY	8	(0)
- * Club domestic league appearances and goals as of 9 November 2025

Emir Miray Köksal (born 18 October 2001) is a Turkish professional footballer who plays as a left back for TFF 2. Lig club Yeni Mersin İY.

== Professional career ==
On 16 April 2020, signed his first professional contract with Fenerbahçe. Köksal made his professional debut with Fenerbahçe in a 3-1 Süper Lig win over Çaykur Rizespor on 25 July 2020.
