= Volatile suspended solids =

Volatile suspended solids (VSS) is an analytical parameter that represents the undissolved organic matter in a water sample. More technically, it is a water quality parameter obtained from the loss on ignition of total suspended solids. The heating of sample generally takes place in an oven at a temperature of 550 °C to 600 °C. It represents the amount of volatile matter present in the undissolved solid fraction of the measured solution. VSS is an important parameter in wastewater treatment and characterization.

== See also ==
- Settleable solids
- Turbidity
- Water pollution
- Water quality

== External links and further reading ==
- National Programme on Technology Enhanced Learning
- Environmental Business Specialists
